= 2022–23 SC Austria Lustenau season =

SC Austria Lustenau
2022–23 season
- Chairman: Bernd Bösch
- Manager: Markus Mader
- Stadium: Reichshofstadion
- Austrian Football Bundesliga: 8th
- Austrian Cup: Second round
- Top goalscorer: League: Lukas Fridrikas (15); All: Lukas Fridrikas (15)

The 2022–23 season was the 109th in the history of SC Austria Lustenau and their first season back in the top flight since 2000. The club participated in the Austrian Football Bundesliga and the Austrian Cup.

== Players ==
Updated 1 July 2022. Note: Flags indicate national team as defined under FIFA eligibility rules; some limited exceptions apply. Players may hold more than one non-FIFA nationality.

No.	Pos.	Nation	Player
4	DF	AUT	Tobias Berger
5	DF	FRA	Jean Hugonet
7	DF	AUT	Fabian Gmeiner
9	FW	CPV	Bryan Teixeira
11	FW	CMR	Michael Cheukoua
12	DF	FRA	Hakim Guenouche
13	DF	AUT	Dragan Marceta
17	MF	AUT	Raul Marte
18	DF	AUT	Leo Mätzler (on loan from Altach)
20	MF	BRA	Wallace
21	FW	AUT	Jan Stefanon
23	MF	AUT	Pius Grabher

No.	Pos.	Nation	Player
24	MF	AUT	Nicolai Bösch
25	FW	SUI	Haris Tabaković
27	GK	AUT	Domenik Schierl
28	DF	BRA	Anderson
31	DF	AUT	Matthias Maak
33	MF	HUN	Daniel Tiefenbach
35	MF	BRA	Adriel
37	DF	AUT	Carlos Berlinger
42	DF	AUT	Florian Rusch
44	DF	AUT	Hannes Küng
79	GK	TUR	Emre Yilmaz
98	GK	AUT	Florian Eres

== Pre-season and friendlies ==
Win Draw Loss Fixtures

18 June 2022 Friendly	Dornbirn	2–3	Austria Lustenau	Dornbirn
17:00 CEST (UTC+2)				Stadium: Stadion Birkenwiese

25 June 2022 Friendly	Austria Lustenau	0–4	Wil	Bürs
10:30 CEST (UTC+2)				Stadium: Sportplatz Uf dr Schesa

2 July 2022 Friendly	Austria Lustenau	0–4	St. Gallen	Lustenau
16:00 CEST (UTC+2)				Stadium: Reichshofstadion

8 July 2022 Friendly	1. FC Köln	4–0	Austria Lustenau	Singen, Germany
18:00 CEST (UTC+2)	Dietz 3'; Kainz 16'; Modeste 74'; Lemperle 86'			Stadium: Hohentwielstadion; Referee: Jonas Brombacher (Germany)

22 September 2022 Friendly	FC Augsburg	5–2	Austria Lustenau	Augsburg
18:00 CEST (UTC+2)				Stadium: Rosenaustadion

24 November 2022 Friendly	Austria Lustenau	4–3	WSG Tirol	Lustenau
17:30 CEST (UTC+2)		Report		Stadium: Reichshofstadion

14 January 2022 Friendly	Austria Lustenau	1–3	Illertissen	Hohenems
14:00 CEST (UTC+2)		Report		Stadium: Herrenriedstadion

17 January 2022 Friendly	Austria Lustenau	5–0	Brühl	Hohenems
18:30 CEST (UTC+2)		Report		Stadium: Herrenriedstadion

21 January 2022 Friendly	Austria Lustenau	0–3	Aarau	Bregenz
14:00 CEST (UTC+2)		Report		Stadium: Sportplatz Viktoria Bregenz

27 January 2022 Friendly	Red Star Belgrade	3–2	Austria Lustenau	Belek
10:00 CEST (UTC+2)		Report		Stadium: Calista Sports Center - Field A

31 January 2022 Friendly	Dynamo Kyiv	2–2	Austria Lustenau	Antalya
16:00 EET		Report		Stadium: Mardan Sports Complex

3 February 2022 Friendly	Austria Lustenau	–	Dornbirn	Lustenau
14:00 CEST (UTC+2)				Stadium: Reichshofstadion

== Competitions ==
=== Overall record ===
Competition	First match	Last match	Starting round	Final position	Record							
Competition	First match	Last match	Starting round	Final position	Pld	W	D	L	GF	GA	GD	Win %
Austrian Football Bundesliga	24 July 2022	2 June 2023	Matchday 1	8th	32	11	10	11	50	54	−4	34.38
Austrian Bundesliga play-offs	5 June 2023	11 June 2023	First leg	Runners-up	3	1	1	1	3	7	−4	33.33
Austrian Cup	16 July 2022	30 August 2022	First round	Second round	2	1	0	1	3	4	−1	50.00
Total					37	13	11	13	56	65	−9	35.14

Source: Soccerway

=== Austrian Football Bundesliga ===
==== Regular season ====
Pos	Team	Pld	W	D	L	GF	GA	GD	Pts	Qualification
6	Austria Klagenfurt	22	9	3	10	35	40	−5	30	Qualification for the Championship round
7	WSG Tirol	22	8	4	10	32	37	−5	28	Qualification for the Relegation round
8	Austria Lustenau	22	7	6	9	29	37	−8	27	Qualification for the Relegation round
9	Wolfsberger AC	22	6	3	13	35	41	−6	21	Qualification for the Relegation round
10	Hartberg	22	5	3	14	22	42	−20	18	Qualification for the Relegation round

Source: Austrian Football Bundesliga
Rules for classification: 1) Points; 2) Head-to-head record; 3) Goal difference; 4) Goals scored; 5) Matches won; 6) Away matches won; 7) Away goals scored.

==== Results summary ====
Overall								Home						Away					
Pld	W	D	L	GF	GA	GD	Pts	W	D	L	GF	GA	GD	W	D	L	GF	GA	GD
22	7	6	9	29	37	−8	27	5	3	3	19	19	0	2	3	6	10	18	−8

Source: Austrian Football Bundesliga

==== Results by round ====
Round	1	2	3	4	5	6	7	8	9	10	11	12	13	14	15	16	17	18	19
Ground	H	A	A	H	A	H	A	H	A	H	A	A	H	H	A	H	A	H	A
Result	W	L	D	W	W	L	D	D	L	L	L	L	D	D	D	W			
Position	3	7	7	4	4	5	5	5	6	8	8	9	10	9	8	8			

Source: Austrian Football Bundesliga
A = Away; H = Home; W = Win; D = Draw; L = Loss

==== Matches ====
The league fixtures were announced on 22 June 2022.

24 July 2022 1	Austria Lustenau	2–1	WSG Tirol	Lustenau
17:00 CEST (UTC+2)	Schmid 11'; Anderson 59'	Report	Prica 87' (pen.)	Stadium: Reichshofstadion; Attendance: 3,483; Referee: Alexander Harkam

30 July 2022 2	Ried	1–0	Austria Lustenau	Ried im Innkreis
17:00 CEST (UTC+2)	Wießmeier 20'	Report		Stadium: Josko Arena; Referee: Sebastian Gishamer

7 August 2022 3	Rapid Wien	1–1	Austria Lustenau	Vienna
17:00 CEST (UTC+2)	Burgstaller 21'; Schick (yellow card) 44'; Bajic (yellow card) 46' (yellow-red card) 58'; Hofmann (yellow card) 90+4'	Report	Grabher (yellow card) 40'; Surdanovic 70'; Guenouche (yellow card) 84'	Stadium: Allianz Stadion; Attendance: 18,825; Referee: (Austria) Stefan Ebner

14 August 2022 4	Austria Lustenau	4–1	Hartberg	Lustenau
17:00 CEST (UTC+2)	Bryan Teixeira 41' (yellow card) 63'; Anderson 44'; Fridrikas 67' (yellow card) 76'; Cheukoua 90+1'	Report	Tadić 8' (pen.); Ejupi (yellow card) 59'; Swete (yellow card) 63'; Steinwender (yellow card) 75'	Stadium: Planet Pure Stadion; Attendance: 3,531; Referee: (Austria) Manuel Schüttengruber

20 August 2022 5	Rheindorf Altach	1–2	Austria Lustenau	Altach
17:00 CEST (UTC+2)	Tibidi (yellow card) 19' (goal) 25'; Thurnwald (yellow card) 69'; Nuhiu (yellow card) 86' (yellow-red card) 90+2'	Report	Anderson (yellow card) 22'; Maak 30'; Bryan Teixeira 89'	Stadium: CASHPOINT Arena; Attendance: 8,500; Referee: (Austria) Sebastian Gishamer

27 August 2022 6	Austria Lustenau	0–6	Red Bull Salzburg	Lustenau
17:00 CEST (UTC+2)	Grabher (yellow card) 90+1'	Report	Fernando 16' (pen.); Kjærgaard 20'; Solet (yellow card) 35'; Capaldo 49'; Okafor 60'; Adamu 78'; Kameri 82'	Stadium: Planet Pure Stadion; Attendance: 4,228; Referee: (Austria) Stefan Ebner

3 September 2022 7	Austria Wien	2–2	Austria Lustenau	Vienna
17:00 CEST (UTC+2)	Ranftl 4'; Lucas Galvão (yellow card) 24'; Jukic 56'; Teigl (yellow card) 90+6'	Report	Surdanovic (yellow card) 25' (yellow-red card) 87'; Fridrikas 27'; Anderson 34'; Schierl (yellow card) 90+3'	Stadium: Generali Arena; Attendance: 9,383; Referee: (Austria) Andreas Heiß

11 September 2022 8	Austria Lustenau	1–1	LASK	Lustenau
14:30 CEST (UTC+2)	Hugonet (yellow card) 31'; Fridrikas 82'	Report	Nakamura 23'; Stojković (yellow card) 30' (yellow-red card) 83'; Goiginger (yellow card) 65'; Jovičić (yellow card) 86'	Stadium: Planet Pure Stadion; Attendance: 4,277; Referee: (Austria) Andreas Heiß

18 September 2022 9	Sturm Graz	2–0	Austria Lustenau	Graz
14:30 CEST (UTC+2)	Prass 24'; Schnegg (yellow card) 71'; Fuseini 83'	Report	Guenouche (yellow card) 15'; Hugonet (yellow card) 58'; Grabher (yellow card) 73'; Anderson (red card) 89'	Stadium: Merkur-Arena; Attendance: 10,237; Referee: (Austria) Markus Hameter

1 October 2022 10	Austria Lustenau	1–3	Wolfsberger AC	Lustenau
17:00 CEST (UTC+2)	Hugonet (yellow card) 12'; Surdanovic 40'; Türkmen (yellow card) 44'	Report	Ballo 3'; Piesinger (yellow card) 22'; Baribo 63'; Röcher 80'; Jasic (yellow card) 88'	Stadium: Planet Pure Stadion; Attendance: 3,254; Referee: (Austria) Oliver Fluch

8 October 2022 11	Austria Klagenfurt	2–1	Austria Lustenau	Klagenfurt
17:00 CEST (UTC+2)	Gezos 15' 64' (yellow card) 80'; Schumacher (yellow card) 49'	Report	Türkmen (yellow card) 44'; Bellache (yellow card) 77'; Schmid 87'	Stadium: 28 Black Arena; Attendance: 3,592; Referee: (Austria) Stefan Ebner

15 October 2022 12	WSG Tirol	3–2	Austria Lustenau	Innsbruck
17:00 CEST (UTC+2)	Schulz 14'; Müller (yellow card) 22'; Ogrinec 27'; Rogelj (yellow card) 29'; Sabitzer 37' (pen.)	Report	Schmid 48'; Bryan Teixeira (yellow card) 63'; Anderson 90+2'	Stadium: Tivoli Stadion Tirol; Attendance: 1,932; Referee: (Austria) Harald Lechner

23 October 2022 13	Austria Lustenau	0–0	Ried	Lustenau
14:30 CEST (UTC+2)	Fridrikas (yellow card) 78'	Report	David Ungar (yellow card) 55'; Michael (yellow card) 90+4'	Stadium: Planet Pure Stadion; Attendance: 4,162; Referee: (Austria) Florian Jäger

29 October 2022 14	Austria Lustenau	3–3	Rapid Wien	Lustenau
17:00 CEST (UTC+2)	Surdanovic 36'; Bryan Teixeira 66' 90+6' (pen.); Grujcic (yellow card) 74'	Report	Burgstaller 59' 90+2' (yellow card) 90+6'; Gartler (yellow card) 85'; Zimmermann 90+10'	Stadium: Planet Pure Stadion; Attendance: 4,437; Referee: (Austria) Chiristian-Petru Ciochirca

5 November 2022 15	Hartberg	1–1	Austria Lustenau	Hartberg
17:00 CET (UTC+1)	Providence 58'; Heil (yellow card) 87'	Report	Grujcic (yellow card) 18' (yellow-red card) 88'; Guenouche 29'; Bryan Teixeira (yellow card) 68'; Surdanovic (yellow card) 82'	Stadium: Profertil Arena; Attendance: 1,966; Referee: (Austria) Alain Sadikovski

12 November 2022 16	Austria Lustenau	3–0	Rheindorf Altach	Lustenau
17:00 CET (UTC+1)	Grabher 8' (yellow card) 86'; Bryan Teixeira 45+6' (pen.) 51'; Gmeiner (yellow card) 60'; Anderson (yellow card) 62'; Schierl (yellow card) 83'	Report	Jäger (yellow card) 14'; Strauß (yellow card) 45+4'; Tibidi (yellow card) 78'	Stadium: Planet Pure Stadion; Attendance: 4,592; Referee: (Austria) Gerhard Grobelnik

11 February 2023 17	Red Bull Sazlburg	–	Austria Lustenau	Wals-Siezenheim
17:00 CET (UTC+1)				Stadium: Red Bull Arena

19 February 2023 18	Austria Lustenau	–	Austria Wien	Lustenau
14:30 CET (UTC+1)				Stadium: Planet Pure Stadion

24 February 2023 19	LASK	–	Austria Lustenau	Pasching
20:30 CET (UTC+1)				Stadium: Raiffeisen Arena

==== Relegation round ====
Pos	Team	Pld	W	D	L	GF	GA	GD	Pts	Qualification	WOL	LUS	WAT	HAR	ALT	RIE
1	Wolfsberger AC	32	12	6	14	51	51	0	31	Qualification for the Europa Conference League play-offs	—	2–2	2–0	2–2	0–0	1–0
2	Austria Lustenau	32	11	10	11	50	54	−4	29	Qualification for the Europa Conference League play-offs	1–3	—	2–4	5–1	1–0	2–2
3	WSG Tirol	32	10	8	14	44	53	−9	24		4–0	0–2	—	1–1	1–1	1–1
4	Hartberg	32	9	6	17	39	56	−17	24		0–2	0–1	5–0	—	2–2	2–0
5	Rheindorf Altach	32	6	10	16	29	53	−24	19		0–2	1–1	1–0	0–1	—	1–1
6	Ried (R)	32	4	11	17	27	50	−23	14	Relegation to Austrian Football Second League	1–2	4–4	1–1	1–3	0–1	—

Legend: Blue = home team win; Yellow = draw; Red = away team win.
Rules for classification: 1) Points; 2) Points with (possible) half points subtracted due to rounding; 3) Head-to-head points; 4) Head-to-head goal difference; 5) Head-to-head goals scored; 6) Head-to-head away goals scored; 7) Goal difference; 8) Goals scored; 9) Matches won; 10) Away matches won; 11) Away goals scored.
(R) Relegated

=== Austrian Cup ===
16 July 2022 Round 1	FC Marchfeld Donauauen	2 - 3	Austria Lustenau	Mannsdorf an der Donau
17:00 CEST	Ortner 12'; Entrup 60' (yellow card) 90'; Bajrami (yellow card) 64'	Report	Surdanovic 46' 54'; Schmid 65'; Schierl (yellow card) 86'; Guenouche (yellow card) 90+1'; Rhein (yellow card) 90+1'	Stadium: Aulandstadion; Attendance: 450; Referee: (Austria) Gerhard Grobelnik

30 August 2022 Round 2	Wiener Sport-Club	2 - 0	Austria Lustenau	Vienna
19:00 CEST	Andrejevic 9' 10'; Buzuk (yellow card) 30'; Dimon (yellow card) 45+2'; Prögelhof (yellow card) 53'; Haas (yellow card) 65'	Report	Grabher (yellow card) 75'	Stadium: Sportclub Stadium; Attendance: 1,852; Referee: (Austria) Jacob Semler
