= 2023–24 SC Austria Lustenau season =

SC Austria Lustenau
2023–24 season
- Manager: Markus Mader (until 13 November); Alexander Schneider (from 13 November)
- Stadium: Reichshofstadion
- Austrian Football Bundesliga: 12th
- Austrian Cup: Third round
- Top goalscorer: League: All: Lukas Fridrikas (6)

The 2023–24 SC Austria Lustenau season is the club's 110th season in existence and its second consecutive season in the top flight of Austrian football. In addition to the domestic league, SC Austria Lustenau will participate in this season's edition of the Austrian Cup and the UEFA Europa League. The season covers the period from 1 July 2023 to 30 June 2024.

== Players ==
=== First-team squad ===
Updated 4 September 2023. Note: Flags indicate national team as defined under FIFA eligibility rules; some limited exceptions apply. Players may hold more than one non-FIFA nationality.

| No. | Pos. | Nation | Player |
|---|---|---|---|
| 2 | DF | MTQ | Boris Moltenis |
| 3 | DF | TOG | Kennedy Boateng |
| 4 | DF | AUT | Tobias Berger |
| 5 | DF | AUT | Leo Mätzler |
| 6 | DF | AUT | Darijo Grujcic |
| 7 | DF | AUT | Fabian Gmeiner |
| 8 | MF | GER | Torben Rhein (on loan from Bayern Munich II) |
| 9 | FW | DEN | Nikolai Baden Frederiksen (on loan from Vitesse) |
| 10 | MF | AUT | Lukas Fridrikas |
| 11 | DF | SEN | Baïla Diallo (on loan from Clermont) |
| 15 | FW | AUT | Namory Cisse |
| 18 | MF | AUT | Anthony Schmid |
| 19 | FW | GER | Ben Bobzien (on loan from Mainz) |

| No. | Pos. | Nation | Player |
|---|---|---|---|
| 20 | MF | FRA | Jonathan Schmid |
| 21 | GK | AUT | Ammar Helac |
| 22 | MF | GUI | Yadaly Diaby (on loan from Clermont) |
| 23 | MF | AUT | Pius Grabher |
| 27 | GK | AUT | Domenik Schierl |
| 28 | DF | BRA | Anderson |
| 29 | GK | AUT | Simon Nesler-Täubl |
| 30 | MF | BRA | Rafael Devisate |
| 31 | DF | AUT | Matthias Maak |
| 33 | MF | HUN | Daniel Tiefenbach |
| 41 | MF | AUT | Enes Koc |
| 70 | FW | AUT | Stefano Surdanovic |

=== Out on loan ===
Note: Flags indicate national team as defined under FIFA eligibility rules; some limited exceptions apply. Players may hold more than one non-FIFA nationality.

| No. | Pos. | Nation | Player |
|---|---|---|---|
| — | DF | AUT | Raul Marte (at Dornbirn] until 30 June 2024) |

== Transfers ==
=== In ===
| Pos. | Player | Transferred from | Fee | Date | Source |
|---|---|---|---|---|---|
| DF | (Austria) Leo Mätzler | (Austria) SKN St. Pölten | €40,000 | 1 July 2023 | |
| FW | (Austria) Namory Cisse | (Netherlands) Fortuna Sittard U21 | Undisclosed | 20 July 2023 | |
| DF | (Martinique) Boris Moltenis | (Poland) Wisła Kraków | €25,000 | 16 August 2023 | |

=== Out ===
| Pos. | Player | Transferred to | Fee | Date | Source |
|---|---|---|---|---|---|
| DF | (France) Hakim Guenouche | Austria Wien | Free | 1 July 2023 | |
| MF | (France) Jean Hugonet | (Germany) 1. FC Magdeburg | Free | 1 July 2023 | |

== Pre-season and friendlies ==
Win Draw Loss Fixtures

| 15 July 2023 Friendly | Austria Lustenau | 1–6 | Holstein Kiel |
| 14:00 CEST (UTC+2) |
Note: Match was played in three 45-minute periods.

| 7 September 2023 Friendly | Schwarz-Weiß Bregenz | 0–0 | Austria Lustenau |
| 18:00 CEST (UTC+2) |

| 12 October 2023 Friendly | Austria Lustenau | 2–1 | FC Vaduz |
| 11:00 CEST (UTC+2) |

| 16 November 2023 Friendly | FC Dornbirn | 1–3 | Austria Lustenau |
| 14:00 CET (UTC+1) |

== Competitions ==
=== Overview ===
| Competition | First match | Last match | Starting round | Final position | Record | | | | | | | |
| Competition | First match | Last match | Starting round | Final position | Pld | W | D | L | GF | GA | GD | Win % |
|---|---|---|---|---|---|---|---|---|---|---|---|---|
| Austrian Football Bundesliga | August 2023 | May 2024 | Matchday 1 | | 17 | 0 | 3 | 14 | 8 | 40 | −32 | 0.00 |
| Austrian Cup | 22 July 2023 | 1 November 2023 | First round | Third round | 3 | 2 | 0 | 1 | 11 | 6 | +5 | 66.67 |
| Total | | | | | 20 | 2 | 3 | 15 | 19 | 46 | −27 | 10.00 |

Last updated: 9 December 2023
Source: Soccerway

=== Austrian Football Bundesliga ===
==== League table ====
| Pos | Team | Pld | W | D | L | GF | GA | GD | Pts | Qualification |
|---|---|---|---|---|---|---|---|---|---|---|
| 8 | Wolfsberger AC | 22 | 8 | 6 | 8 | 29 | 32 | −3 | 30 | Qualification for the Relegation round |
| 9 | SCR Altach | 22 | 4 | 7 | 11 | 17 | 30 | −13 | 19 | Qualification for the Relegation round |
| 10 | Blau-Weiß Linz | 22 | 4 | 7 | 11 | 22 | 38 | −16 | 19 | Qualification for the Relegation round |
| 11 | WSG Tirol | 22 | 4 | 2 | 16 | 20 | 42 | −22 | 14 | Qualification for the Relegation round |
| 12 | Austria Lustenau | 22 | 2 | 4 | 16 | 13 | 49 | −36 | 10 | Qualification for the Relegation round |

Source: Austrian Football Bundesliga
Rules for classification: 1) Points; 2) Head-to-head record; 3) Goal difference; 4) Goals scored; 5) Matches won; 6) Away matches won; 7) Away goals scored.

| Pos | Team | Pld | W | D | L | GF | GA | GD | Pts | Qualification | STU | RBS | LASK | RWI | HAR | AKL |
|---|---|---|---|---|---|---|---|---|---|---|---|---|---|---|---|---|
| 1 | Sturm Graz (C) | 32 | 19 | 10 | 3 | 56 | 23 | +33 | 44 | Qualification for the Champions League league stage | — | 0–1 | 1–0 | 1–0 | 1–1 | 2–0 |
| 2 | Red Bull Salzburg | 32 | 20 | 7 | 5 | 74 | 29 | +45 | 42 | Qualification for the Champions League third qualifying round (Note: Since the Europa League winners, Atalanta qualified for the Champions League via league position, Red Bull Salzburg were promoted from the Champions League second qualifying round to the third qualifying round as one of the two teams with the highest coefficient in the second qualifying round.) | 2–2 | — | 7–1 | 1–1 | 5–1 | 4–2 |
| 3 | LASK | 32 | 14 | 10 | 8 | 43 | 33 | +10 | 34 | Qualification for the Europa League play-off round (Note: The 2023–24 Austrian Cup winners qualified for the Europa League play-off round. Since the cup winners (Sturm Graz) qualified based on league position, the Europa League spot was passed to the third-placed team.) | 2–2 | 3–1 | — | 5–0 | 1–3 | 1–0 |
| 4 | Rapid Wien | 32 | 11 | 12 | 9 | 47 | 35 | +12 | 28 | Qualification for the Europa League second qualifying round | 1–3 | 2–0 | 0–0 | — | 0–3 | 1–1 |
| 5 | Hartberg | 32 | 12 | 9 | 11 | 49 | 52 | −3 | 28 | Qualification for the Conference League play-offs | 1–3 | 1–5 | 1–2 | 0–3 | — | 3–2 |
| 6 | Austria Klagenfurt | 32 | 9 | 12 | 11 | 40 | 50 | −10 | 22 | | 0–4 | 4–3 | 0–2 | 0–1 | 2–2 | — |

Source: Austrian Football Bundesliga
Legend: Blue = home team win; Yellow = draw; Red = away team win.
Rules for classification: 1) Points; 2) Points with (possible) half points subtracted due to rounding; 3) Head-to-head points; 4) Head-to-head goal difference; 5) Head-to-head goals scored; 6) Goal difference; 7) Goals scored; 8) Matches won; 9) Away matches won; 10) Away goals scored.
(C) Champions
Notes:

| Pos | Team | Pld | W | D | L | GF | GA | GD | Pts | Qualification | WOL | AWI | BWL | ALT | WAT | LUS |
|---|---|---|---|---|---|---|---|---|---|---|---|---|---|---|---|---|
| 1 | Wolfsberger AC | 32 | 12 | 10 | 10 | 41 | 39 | +2 | 31 | Qualification for the Conference League play-offs | — | 0–1 | 0–2 | 0–0 | 3–1 | 1–1 |
| 2 | Austria Wien (O) | 32 | 12 | 10 | 10 | 35 | 34 | +1 | 29 | Qualification for the Conference League play-offs | 0–4 | — | 0–0 | 2–2 | 3–0 | 1–1 |
| 3 | Blau-Weiß Linz | 32 | 7 | 11 | 14 | 33 | 48 | −15 | 22 | | 0–0 | 1–2 | — | 2–1 | 3–2 | 0–0 |
| 4 | Rheindorf Altach | 32 | 6 | 13 | 13 | 27 | 40 | −13 | 21 | | 0–1 | 1–1 | 2–2 | — | 0–0 | 2–2 |
| 5 | WSG Tirol | 32 | 7 | 5 | 20 | 29 | 55 | −26 | 19 | | 1–1 | 1–0 | 2–1 | 0–1 | — | 0–0 |
| 6 | Austria Lustenau (R) | 32 | 4 | 9 | 19 | 22 | 58 | −36 | 16 | Relegation to Austrian Football Second League | 1–2 | 2–0 | 1–0 | 0–1 | 1–2 | — |

Legend: Blue = home team win; Yellow = draw; Red = away team win.
Rules for classification: 1) Points; 2) Points with (possible) half points subtracted due to rounding; 3) Head-to-head points; 4) Head-to-head goal difference; 5) Head-to-head goals scored; 6) Head-to-head away goals scored; 7) Goal difference; 8) Goals scored; 9) Matches won; 10) Away matches won; 11) Away goals scored.
(O) Play-off winners; (R) Relegated

==== Results summary ====
| Overall | | | | | | | | Home | | | | | | Away | | | | | |
| Pld | W | D | L | GF | GA | GD | Pts | W | D | L | GF | GA | GD | W | D | L | GF | GA | GD |
|---|---|---|---|---|---|---|---|---|---|---|---|---|---|---|---|---|---|---|---|
| 0 | 0 | 0 | 0 | 0 | 0 | 0 | 0 | 0 | 0 | 0 | 0 | 0 | 0 | 0 | 0 | 0 | 0 | 0 | 0 |

Last updated: November 2023.

==== Results by round ====
| Round | 1 |
|---|---|
| Ground | |
| Result | |
| Position | |

Updated to match(es) played on November 2023. Source:
A = Away; H = Home; W = Win; D = Draw; L = Loss

==== Matches ====
The league fixtures were unveiled on 27 June 2023.

| August 2023 1 | v |

=== Austrian Cup ===
The draw for the season's first round took place on 25 June.

| 21 July 2023 First round | SPG Silz/Mötz | v | Austria Lustenau |
