= 2022–23 Austrian Football Bundesliga =

111th season of top-tier football in Austria

Austrian Bundesliga
- Season: 2022–23
- Dates: 22 July 2022 – 3 June 2023
- Champions: Red Bull Salzburg (17th title)
- Relegated: Ried
- Champions League: Red Bull Salzburg; Sturm Graz
- Europa League: LASK
- Europa Conference League: Rapid Wien; Austria Wien
- Matches: 193
- Goals: 571 (2.96 per match)
- Top goalscorer: Guido Burgstaller (21 goals)
- Biggest home win: Rapid Wien 5–1 Hartberg; Red Bull Salzburg 4–0 Lustenau; Sturm Graz 4–0 Rheindorf Altach
- Biggest away win: Lustenau 0–6 Salzburg
- Highest scoring: Wolfsberg 3–4 Klagenfurt
- Longest winning run: 8 games Salzburg
- Longest unbeaten run: 19 games Salzburg
- Longest winless run: 11 games Ried
- Longest losing run: 5 games Wolfsberg
- Total attendance: 1,347,132
- Average attendance: 7,443

The 2022–23 Austrian Football Bundesliga, also known as Admiral Bundesliga for sponsorship reasons, was the 111th season of top-tier football in Austria. Red Bull Salzburg were the nine-times defending champions. The season began on 22 July 2022. The regular season scheduled for November was postponed until the conclusion of the 2022 FIFA World Cup. The league resumed on 10 February and concluded on 3 June 2023. Red Bull Salzburg defended their title for the tenth consecutive season.

== Teams ==
=== Changes ===
Admira Wacker Mödling were relegated to the 2022–23 Austrian Football Second League after finishing in last place in the 2021–22 Relegation Round, ending their eleven-year stay in the top flight. Austria Lustenau were promoted, after a twenty-two year hiatus, as champions of the 2021–22 Austrian Football Second League.

=== Stadia and locations ===
Location of teams in the 2022–23 Austrian Football Bundesliga

Team	Location	Venue	Capacity
Austria Klagenfurt	Klagenfurt	Wörthersee Stadion	29,863
Austria Lustenau	Lustenau	Reichshofstadion	8,800
Austria Wien	Vienna	Generali Arena	17,500
LASK	Linz	Waldstadion Pasching^{1} Raiffeisen Arena	6,009; 19,080
Rapid Wien	Vienna	Allianz Stadion	28,000
Red Bull Salzburg	Wals-Siezenheim	Red Bull Arena	17,218 (30,188)
Rheindorf Altach	Altach	Stadion Schnabelholz	8,500
Sturm Graz	Graz	Merkur-Arena	16,364
SV Ried	Ried im Innkreis	Keine Sorgen Arena	7,680
TSV Hartberg	Hartberg	Stadion Hartberg	4,635
Wolfsberger AC	Wolfsberg	Lavanttal-Arena	7,300
WSG Tirol	Innsbruck	Tivoli Stadion Tirol	16,008

1. LASK moved to Raiffeisen Arena in February 2023.

=== Personnel and kits ===
Note: Flags indicate national team as has been defined under FIFA eligibility rules. Players may hold more than one non-FIFA nationality.

Team	Manager	Captain	Kit manufacturer	Shirt sponsor
Austria Klagenfurt	(Austria) Peter Pacult	(Austria) Markus Pink	Capelli Sport	28 Black
Austria Lustenau	(Austria) Markus Mader	(Austria) Matthias Maak	Uhlsport	Hypo Vorarlberg Bank
Austria Wien	(Austria) Cem Sekerlioglu	(Germany) Lukas Mühl	Nike	Frankstahl
LASK	(Austria) Dietmar Kühbauer	(Austria) Alexander Schlager	BWT	Backaldrin Kornspritz
Rapid Wien	(Austria) Zoran Barisic	(Austria) Maximilian Hofmann	Puma	Wien Energie
Red Bull Salzburg	(Germany) Matthias Jaissle	(Austria) Andreas Ulmer	Nike	Red Bull
Rheindorf Altach	(Germany) Miroslav Klose	(Austria) Jan Zwischenbrugger	Jako	Cashpoint
Sturm Graz	(Austria) Christian Ilzer	(Austria) Stefan Hierländer	Nike	Puntigamer
SV Ried	(Austria) Christian Heinle	(Austria) Marcel Ziegl	Hummel	Guntamatic
TSV Hartberg	(Austria) Klaus Schmidt	(Austria) René Swete	Adidas	Eggerglas, Admiral, Profertil, Spermbooster, Boxxenstopp
Wolfsberger AC	(Germany) Robin Dutt	(Austria) Mario Leitgeb	San Sirro	RZ Pellets
WSG Tirol	(Austria) Thomas Silberberger	(Germany) Ferdinand Oswald	Puma	Swarovski

== Regular season ==
=== League table ===
Pos	Team	Pld	W	D	L	GF	GA	GD	Pts	Qualification
1	Red Bull Salzburg	22	17	4	1	49	13	+36	55	Qualification for the Championship round
2	Sturm Graz	22	14	6	2	37	15	+22	48	Qualification for the Championship round
3	LASK	22	10	8	4	38	28	+10	38	Qualification for the Championship round
4	Rapid Wien	22	10	3	9	34	26	+8	33	Qualification for the Championship round
5	Austria Wien	22	10	5	7	37	31	+6	32 (Note: Austria Wien were deducted 3 points due to license violation.)	Qualification for the Championship round
6	Austria Klagenfurt	22	9	3	10	35	40	−5	30	Qualification for the Championship round
7	WSG Tirol	22	8	4	10	32	37	−5	28	Qualification for the Relegation round
8	Austria Lustenau	22	7	6	9	29	37	−8	27	Qualification for the Relegation round
9	Wolfsberger AC	22	6	3	13	35	41	−6	21	Qualification for the Relegation round
10	Hartberg	22	5	3	14	22	42	−20	18	Qualification for the Relegation round
11	SV Ried	22	4	6	12	16	32	−16	18	Qualification for the Relegation round
12	Rheindorf Altach	22	4	5	13	22	44	−22	17	Qualification for the Relegation round

Source: Austrian Football Bundesliga
Rules for classification: 1) Points; 2) Head-to-head record; 3) Goal difference; 4) Goals scored; 5) Matches won; 6) Away matches won; 7) Away goals scored.

=== Results ===
Home \ Away	KLA	LUS	AWI	ALT	HAR	LIN	RWI	RBS	STU	RIE	WAT	WOL
Austria Klagenfurt	—	2–1	3–3	3–0	1–0	1–3	0–1	0–1	0–2	1–0	2–3	0–3
Austria Lustenau	4–2	—	1–0	3–0	4–1	1–1	3–3	0–6	0–2	0–0	2–1	1–3
Austria Wien	3–1	2–2	—	2–1	3–0	1–1	2–0	1–3	0–3	3–0	2–1	0–1
Rheindorf Altach	1–4	1–2	3–2	—	1–0	0–1	0–1	2–3	1–1	1–2	0–0	2–2
Hartberg	2–3	1–1	0–3	2–1	—	2–2	1–2	0–2	1–2	2–0	1–5	2–1
LASK	3–1	1–0	2–2	4–1	0–3	—	2–1	0–2	1–1	1–1	1–4	4–1
Rapid Wien	0–1	1–1	1–2	3–0	5–1	1–0	—	2–4	1–2	1–0	2–0	1–3
Red Bull Salzburg	2–0	4–0	3–0	1–1	1–0	1–1	1–1	—	0–0	2–0	2–0	2–1
Sturm Graz	1–2	2–0	3–1	4–0	0–0	0–1	1–0	2–1	—	2–1	2–1	3–2
SV Ried	2–2	1–0	1–3	2–3	0–1	1–1	1–0	0–3	1–1	—	1–2	0–0
WSG Tirol	2–2	3–2	0–0	0–0	2–1	2–3	0–5	1–3	0–2	2–0	—	1–3
Wolfsberger AC	3–4	0–1	1–2	2–3	3–1	1–5	1–2	1–2	1–1	1–2	1–2	—

Source: soccerway.com
Legend: Blue = home team win; Yellow = draw; Red = away team win.

== Results by round ==
Team ╲ Round	1	2	3	4	5	6	7	8	9	10	11	12	13	14	15	16	17	18	19	20	21	22
Austria Klagenfurt	L	L	D	W	L	D	W	L	W	W	W	L	W	L	D	L	L	L	W	W	W	L
Austria Lustenau	W	L	D	W	W	L	D	D	L	L	L	L	D	D	D	W	L	W	L	L	W	W
Austria Wien	L	D	L	W	W	W	D	W	W	L	W	L	D	W	D	L	W	L	W	W	L	W
LASK	W	D	W	W	W	W	D	D	L	D	L	W	D	W	L	D	W	D	W	W	L	D
Rapid Wien	W	W	D	L	W	L	W	L	D	W	L	L	L	D	W	W	L	W	W	L	W	L
Red Bull Salzburg	W	L	W	W	W	W	W	W	D	D	W	W	D	W	W	W	W	W	W	W	W	D
Rheindorf Altach	L	D	W	L	L	L	L	D	L	W	L	W	W	L	D	L	L	L	D	L	L	D
Sturm Graz	D	W	D	W	L	W	D	W	W	W	W	W	D	W	D	D	W	W	L	W	W	W
SV Ried	L	W	D	L	L	L	D	L	L	L	W	W	D	L	D	L	W	D	L	L	W	D
Hartberg	W	L	L	L	L	W	D	L	L	L	W	L	L	L	D	L	W	L	L	W	L	D
Wolfsberger AC	D	D	L	L	L	W	L	W	W	W	L	L	L	L	L	W	L	W	L	L	L	D
WSG Tirol	L	W	D	L	W	L	L	D	W	L	L	W	W	W	D	W	W	L	D	L	L	L

Updated to match(es) played on 19 March 2023. Source: Soccerway.com
W = Win; D = Draw; L = Lose

=== Positions by round ===
Team ╲ Round	1	2	3	4	5	6	7	8	9	10	11	12	13	14	15	16	17	18	19	20	21	22
Red Bull Salzburg	1	7	3	2	2	2	1	1	1	1	1	1	1	1	1	1	1	1	1	1	1	1
Sturm Graz	6	3	4	3	4	3	4	3	3	2	2	2	2	2	2	2	2	2	2	2	2	2
LASK	2	2	1	1	1	1	2	2	2	3	3	3	3	3	3	3	3	3	3	3	3	3
Rapid Wien	5	1	2	5	5	5	3	4	4	4	4	4	5	7	4	4	5	4	4	4	4	4
Austria Wien	12	12	12	12	9	8	9	6	5	7	6	6	7	6	7	7	6	6	6	5	6	5
Austria Klagenfurt	11	11	11	6	8	9	6	7	7	5	5	5	4	5	5	6	7	7	7	7	5	6
WSG Tirol	9	6	7	7	6	6	7	9	9	9	9	8	6	4	6	5	4	5	5	6	7	7
Austria Lustenau	3	5	8	4	3	4	5	5	6	8	8	9	10	10	8	8	8	8	8	8	8	8
Wolfsberger AC	7	9	10	11	12	10	11	8	8	6	7	7	9	8	10	9	9	9	9	9	9	9
Hartberg	4	8	9	10	11	7	8	10	10	11	10	12	12	12	12	12	11	11	11	10	10	10
SV Ried	10	4	6	9	10	11	10	11	11	12	12	11	11	11	11	11	12	12	12	12	11	11
Rheindorf Altach	8	10	5	8	7	12	12	12	12	10	11	10	8	9	9	10	10	10	10	11	12	12

Relegation to Austrian 2. Liga

Updated to match(es) played on 19 March 2023. Source: bundesliga.at

== Championship round ==
The points obtained during the regular season were halved (and rounded down) before the start of the playoff. As a result, the teams started with the following points before the playoff: Red Bull Salzburg 27, Sturm Graz 24, LASK 19, Austria Wien 16, Rapid Wien 16, and Austria Klagenfurt 15. The points of Red Bull Salzburg and Rapid Wien were rounded down – in the event of any ties on points at the end of the playoffs, a half point will be added for these teams.

Pos	Team	Pld	W	D	L	GF	GA	GD	Pts	Qualification	RBS	STU	LIN	RWI	AWI	KLA
1	Red Bull Salzburg (C)	32	23	8	1	67	22	+45	49	Qualification for the Champions League group stage	—	2–1	0–0	2–1	3–3	3–2
2	Sturm Graz	32	20	6	6	57	29	+28	42	Qualification for the Champions League third qualifying round	0–2	—	2–0	3–1	3–2	4–1
3	LASK	32	14	12	6	54	38	+16	35	Qualification for the Europa League play-off round	0–1	2–1	—	3–1	3–1	4–0
4	Rapid Wien	32	12	6	14	50	47	+3	25	Qualification for the Europa Conference League third qualifying round	1–1	3–2	1–1	—	3–3	3–1
5	Austria Wien (O)	32	11	10	11	55	52	+3	24	Qualification for the Europa Conference League play-offs	1–1	1–2	2–2	3–1	—	1–2
6	Austria Klagenfurt	32	11	5	16	45	63	−18	23		0–3	0–2	1–1	2–1	1–1	—

Source: Austrian Football Bundesliga
Legend: Blue = home team win; Yellow = draw; Red = away team win.
Rules for classification: 1) Points; 2) Points with (possible) half points subtracted due to rounding; 3) Head-to-head points; 4) Head-to-head goal difference; 5) Head-to-head goals scored; 6) Head-to-head away goals scored; 7) Goal difference; 8) Goals scored; 9) Matches won; 10) Away matches won; 11) Away goals scored.
(C) Champions; (O) Play-off winners

== Relegation round ==
The points obtained during the regular season were halved (and rounded down) before the start of the playoff. As a result, the teams started with the following points before the playoff: Tirol 14, Lustenau 13, Wolfsberg 10, Hartberg 9, Ried 9, and Rheindorf Altach 8. The points of Lustenau, Hartberg and Rheindorf Altach were rounded down – in the event of any ties on points at the end of the playoffs, a half point will be added for these teams.

Pos	Team	Pld	W	D	L	GF	GA	GD	Pts	Qualification	WOL	LUS	WAT	HAR	ALT	RIE
1	Wolfsberger AC	32	12	6	14	51	51	0	31	Qualification for the Europa Conference League play-offs	—	2–2	2–0	2–2	0–0	1–0
2	Austria Lustenau	32	11	10	11	50	54	−4	29	Qualification for the Europa Conference League play-offs	1–3	—	2–4	5–1	1–0	2–2
3	WSG Tirol	32	10	8	14	44	53	−9	24		4–0	0–2	—	1–1	1–1	1–1
4	Hartberg	32	9	6	17	39	56	−17	24		0–2	0–1	5–0	—	2–2	2–0
5	Rheindorf Altach	32	6	10	16	29	53	−24	19		0–2	1–1	1–0	0–1	—	1–1
6	Ried (R)	32	4	11	17	27	50	−23	14	Relegation to Austrian Football Second League	1–2	4–4	1–1	1–3	0–1	—

Legend: Blue = home team win; Yellow = draw; Red = away team win.
Rules for classification: 1) Points; 2) Points with (possible) half points subtracted due to rounding; 3) Head-to-head points; 4) Head-to-head goal difference; 5) Head-to-head goals scored; 6) Head-to-head away goals scored; 7) Goal difference; 8) Goals scored; 9) Matches won; 10) Away matches won; 11) Away goals scored.
(R) Relegated

== Europa Conference League play-offs ==
The winner and runner-up of the relegation round, the fifth-placed team from the championship round play to determine the qualifier to the Europa Conference League second qualifying round.

Semi-final			Final
			8	Austria Lustenau	1	0	1
7	Wolfsberger AC	1	5	Austria Wien	1	5	6
8	Austria Lustenau	2

=== Semi-final ===
5 June 2023	Wolfsberger AC	1–2 (a.e.t.)	Austria Lustenau	Lavanttal-Arena, Wolfsberg
19:00	Baribo (yellow card) 59' (goal) 85' (pen.); Scherzer (yellow card) 90+4'; Omić (yellow card) 113'; Kerschbaumer (yellow card) 120+2'	Report	Maak (yellow card) 84'; Grabher (yellow card) 90'; Grujcic 90+6' (Rhein); Fridrikas 105' (Rhein); Cheukoua (yellow card) 105+1'	Referee: Christopher Jäger

=== Final ===
8 June 2023	Austria Lustenau	1–1	Austria Wien	Reichshofstadion, Lustenau
17:00	Fridrikas 17' (Diaby); Surdanovic (yellow card) 55'; Grabher (yellow card) 74'; Berger (yellow card) 75'; Tiefenbach (yellow card) 78'	Report	Braunöder (yellow card) 25'; Martins (yellow card) 34'; Fischer 46' (Holland) (yellow card) 74'; Gruber (yellow card) 48'; Holland (yellow card) 74'	Referee: Walter Altmann

11 June 2023	Austria Wien	5–0	Austria Lustenau	Generali Arena, Vienna
17:00	Fischer 19', 46'; Martins (yellow card) 56'; Tabaković 61'; Fitz 84'; Gruber 86'; Braunöder (yellow card) 89'	Report	Hugonet (red card) 17'; Adriel (yellow card) 83'; Fridrikas (yellow card) 40'; Türkmen (yellow card) 89'

== Statistics ==
=== Top scorers ===
As of 5 June 2023

Rank	Player	Club	Goals
1	(Austria) Guido Burgstaller	Rapid Wien	21
2	(Switzerland) Haris Tabaković	Austria Wien	17
2	(Israel) Tai Baribo	Wolfsberger AC	17
4	(Slovenia) Benjamin Šeško	Red Bull Salzburg	16
4	(Austria) Markus Pink	Austria Klagenfurt	16
6	(Austria) Lukas Fridrikas	Austria Lustenau	15
7	(Japan) Keito Nakamura	LASK	14
8	(Croatia) Marin Ljubičić	LASK	12
9	(Austria) Robert Žulj	LASK	11
10	(Kosovo) Atdhe Nuhiu	Rheindorf Altach	10
10	(Austria) Junior Adamu	Red Bull Salzburg	10
9	(Austria) Manprit Sarkaria	Sturm Graz	9
9	(Netherlands) Emanuel Emegha	Sturm Graz	9

=== Hat-tricks ===
Player	Club	Against	Result	Date
(Croatia) Marin Ljubičić	LASK	Wolfsberger AC	5–1 (H)	6 August 2022
(Austria) Markus Pink	Austria Klagenfurt	Rheindorf Altach	4–1 (A)	17 September 2022
(Austria) Guido Burgstaller	Rapid Wien	Hartberg	5–1 (H)	26 October 2022
(Slovenia) Benjamin Šeško	Red Bull Salzburg	Rapid Wien	4–2 (A)	5 March 2023

=== Discipline ===
==== Player ====
- Most yellow cards: 8
  - (Austria) Lukas Jäger (SC Rheindorf Altach)
- Most red cards: 2
  - (Austria) David Ungar (SV Ried)

==== Club ====
- Most yellow cards: 60
  - Rapid Vienna
- Most red cards: 7
  - SV Ried
- Fewest yellow cards: 38
  - Wolfsberger AC
- Fewest red cards: 1
  - TSV Hartberg
  - Austria Wien
  - Sturm Graz
  - Wolfsberger AC

== Awards ==
=== Annual awards ===
Award	Winner	Club
Player of the Season	(Austria) Nicolas Seiwald	Red Bull Salzburg
Goalkeeper of the Season	(Switzerland) Philipp Köhn	Red Bull Salzburg
Newcomer of the Season	(Netherlands) Emanuel Emegha	Sturm Graz
Coach of the Season	(Austria) Christian Ilzer	Sturm Graz

=== Team of the Year ===

Team of the Year
Goalkeeper	(Switzerland) Philipp Köhn (Red Bull Salzburg)			
Defence	(Austria) Amar Dedić (Red Bull Salzburg)	(Serbia) Strahinja Pavlović (Red Bull Salzburg)	(Switzerland) Gregory Wüthrich (Sturm Graz)	(Austria) David Schnegg (Sturm Graz)
Midfield	(Austria) Alexander Prass (Sturm Graz)	(Slovenia) Jon Gorenc Stanković (Sturm Graz)	(Austria) Nicolas Seiwald (Red Bull Salzburg)	(Austria) Manprit Sarkaria (Sturm Graz)
Attack	(Austria) Guido Burgstaller (Rapid Wien)		(Bosnia and Herzegovina) Haris Tabaković (Austria Wien)	

== Attendances ==
Rapid Wien drew the highest average home attendance in the 2022-23 edition of the Austrian Football Bundesliga.

#	Football club	Home games	Average attendance
1	Rapid Wien	16	18,846
2	Sturm Graz	16	13,282
3	Red Bull Salzburg	16	12,364
4	Austria Wien	17	11,588
5	LASK	16	8,606
6	SCR Altach	16	4,960
7	SV Ried	16	4,558
8	Austria Klagenfurt	16	4,361
9	Austria Lustenau	17	4,061
10	Wolfsberger AC	17	3,025
11	TSV Hartberg	16	2,538
12	WSG Tirol	16	2,439
