= List of Austrian football transfers winter 2022–23 =

This is a list of Austrian football transfers for the 2022–23 winter transfer window. Only transfers featuring Austrian Football Bundesliga are listed.

== Austrian Football Bundesliga ==
Note: Flags indicate national team as has been defined under FIFA eligibility rules. Players may hold more than one non-FIFA nationality.

=== Red Bull Salzburg ===
In:

No.	Pos.	Nation	Player
5	DF	CMR	Jérôme Onguéné (on loan from (Germany) Eintracht Frankfurt)
37	MF	ISR	Oscar Gloukh (from (Israel) Maccabi Tel Aviv)
—	MF	MLI	Soumaila Diabate (from (Mali) Guidars)

Out:

No.	Pos.	Nation	Player
1	GK	GER	Nico Mantl (on loan to (Denmark) AaB)
4	DF	POL	Kamil Piątkowski (on loan to (Belgium) Gent)
10	MF	FRA	Antoine Bernède (on loan to (Switzerland) Lausanne)
15	MF	MLI	Mamady Diambou (on loan to (Switzerland) Luzern)
23	FW	CRO	Roko Šimić (on loan to (Switzerland) Zürich)
24	MF	MLI	Youba Diarra (to (Spain) Cádiz)
39	DF	AUT	Maximilian Wöber (to (England) Leeds United)
—	MF	MLI	Soumaila Diabate (on loan to Liefering)
—	MF	MLI	Mamadou Sangare (on loan to TSV Hartberg, previously on loan at (Belgium) Zulte Waregem)
—	MF	MLI	Ousmane Diakité (to TSV Hartberg, previously on loan at (Switzerland) St. Gallen)

=== Sturm Graz ===
In:

No.	Pos.	Nation	Player
1	GK	ENG	Arthur Okonkwo (on loan from (England) Arsenal, previously on loan at (England) Crewe Alexandra)
17	FW	CPV	Bryan Teixeira (from Austria Lustenau)

Out:

No.	Pos.	Nation	Player
17	MF	AUT	Vesel Demaku (on loan to Austria Klagenfurt)
18	DF	CRO	Alois Oroz (loan return to (Netherlands) Vitesse)
26	MF	AUT	Christoph Lang (on loan to SV Ried)
34	DF	AUT	Simon Nelson (to SCR Altach)
36	DF	AUT	Vincent Trummer (to SV Lafnitz)
41	GK	AUT	Christopher Giuliani (to Kapfenberger SV)

=== Austria Wien ===
In:

No.	Pos.	Nation	Player
16	DF	ISR	Doron Leidner (on loan from (Greece) Olympiacos)

Out:

No.	Pos.	Nation	Player
89	DF	FRA	Billy Koumetio (loan return to (England) Liverpool)
—	DF	MKD	Filip Antovski (to (Czech Republic) Karviná, previously on loan at (Croatia) Istra)

=== Wolfsberger AC ===
In:

No.	Pos.	Nation	Player
5	DF	GER	Tim Oermann (on loan from (Germany) VfL Bochum)

Out:

No.	Pos.	Nation	Player
29	FW	GRE	Nikos Vergos (on loan to (Greece) Lamia)

=== Rapid Wien ===
In:

No.	Pos.	Nation	Player
2	DF	NED	Denso Kasius (on loan from (Italy) Bologna)

Out:

No.	Pos.	Nation	Player
35	FW	AUT	Nicolas Binder (to Austria Klagenfurt)

=== Austria Klagenfurt ===
In:

No.	Pos.	Nation	Player
16	FW	AUT	Nicolas Binder (from Rapid Wien)
21	MF	AUT	Vesel Demaku (on loan from Sturm Graz)

Out:

No.	Pos.	Nation	Player
4	DF	SRB	Nikola Đorić (on loan to (Croatia) Šibenik)
32	FW	AUT	Markus Pink (to (China) Shanghai Port)
77	FW	CAN	Gloire Amanda (to (Canada) Whitecaps 2)
—	MF	AUT	Fabio Markelic (on loan to (Germany) Viktoria Berlin)

=== WSG Tirol ===
In:

No.	Pos.	Nation	Player

Out:

No.	Pos.	Nation	Player
9	FW	SVN	Nik Prelec (to (Italy) Cagliari)

=== LASK ===
In:

No.	Pos.	Nation	Player
11	FW	CRO	Marin Ljubičić (from (Croatia) Hajduk Split, previously on loan)
17	FW	NGA	Moses Usor (on loan from (Czech Republic) Slavia Prague)
21	DF	UKR	Maksym Talovyerov (on loan from (Czech Republic) Slavia Prague, previously on loan at (Czech Republic) Slovan Liberec)
23	MF	GHA	Ibrahim Mustapha (from (Serbia) Red Star Belgrade)
—	MF	SRB	Jovan Lukić (from (Serbia) Čukarički)

Out:

No.	Pos.	Nation	Player
14	FW	AUT	Husein Balić (on loan to SCR Altach)
20	FW	GRE	Efthymis Koulouris (on loan to (Turkey) Alanyaspor)
26	DF	CZE	Filip Twardzik (on loan to (Slovakia) Spartak Trnava)
39	GK	AUT	Nikolas Polster (on loan to Vorwärts Steyr)
—	MF	SRB	Jovan Lukić (on loan to (Portugal) Torreense)

=== TSV Hartberg ===
In:

No.	Pos.	Nation	Player
1	GK	AUT	Fabian Ehmann (from SV Horn)
19	DF	AUT	Manuel Pfeifer (from SV Lafnitz)
25	MF	AUT	Julian Halwachs (from Liefering)
27	MF	AUT	Dominik Prokop (on loan from (Croatia) Gorica)
32	MF	MLI	Ousmane Diakité (from Red Bull Salzburg, previously on loan at (Switzerland) St. Gallen)
45	MF	MLI	Mamadou Sangare (on loan from Red Bull Salzburg, previously on loan at (Belgium) Zulte Waregem)
77	FW	KOS	Donis Avdijaj (on loan from (Switzerland) Zürich)

Out:

No.	Pos.	Nation	Player
1	GK	AUT	René Swete (retired)
9	FW	TUR	Okan Aydin (to (Hungary) Debrecen)
27	DF	AUT	Thomas Kofler (to Imst)
32	MF	SWE	Albert Ejupi (to (Israel) Hapoel Hadera)
90	FW	ROU	Patrick Gânțe (on loan to SV Lafnitz)
92	FW	AUT	Jakob Knollmüller (on loan to SV Lafnitz)

=== SV Ried ===
In:

No.	Pos.	Nation	Player
3	DF	CRO	Roko Jurišić (from (Croatia) Rijeka)
42	GK	AUT	Richard Strebinger (free agent)
71	MF	AUT	Christoph Lang (on loan from Sturm Graz)
77	MF	SRB	Aleksandar Lutovac (from (Serbia) Partizan)
—	FW	AUT	Stefan Kordic (from Kapfenberger SV)

Out:

No.	Pos.	Nation	Player
31	MF	GER	Agyemang Diawusie (to (Germany) SpVgg Bayreuth)
45	MF	CIV	Gontie Junior Diomandé (on loan to Amstetten)
69	MF	GER	Oliver Kragl (to (Italy) Messina)

=== SCR Altach ===
In:

No.	Pos.	Nation	Player
1	GK	DEN	Andreas Jungdal (on loan from (Italy) Milan)
3	DF	AUT	Simon Nelson (from Sturm Graz)
12	FW	SRB	Marko Lazetić (on loan from (Italy) Milan)
24	MF	CRO	Jurica Jurčec (from (Croatia) Jarun Zagreb)
29	FW	AUT	Husein Balić (on loan from LASK)
30	DF	GER	David Herold (on loan from (Germany) Bayern Munich II)
33	MF	GER	Mike-Steven Bähre (free agent)

Out:

No.	Pos.	Nation	Player
3	DF	AUT	Lukas Prokop (to DSV Leoben)
8	FW	ISR	Guy Dahan (to (Israel) Maccabi Petah Tikva)
15	MF	GHA	Forson Amankwah (loan return to Red Bull Salzburg)
29	FW	FRA	Alexis Tibidi (loan return to (Germany) VfB Stuttgart)
30	FW	CRO	Sandi Križman (free agent)
31	GK	AUT	Armin Gremsl (to (Germany) Arminia Bielefeld)
37	FW	AUT	Ronny Rikal (to FAC)
42	MF	MLI	Bakary Nimaga (free agent)
—	DF	AUT	David Bumberger (to Vorwärts Steyr, previously on loan)

=== Austria Lustenau ===
In:

No.	Pos.	Nation	Player
9	FW	TUR	Emrehan Gedikli (on loan from (Turkey) Trabzonspor)
10	MF	SRB	Nemanja Motika (on loan from (Serbia) Red Star Belgrade)

Out:

No.	Pos.	Nation	Player
10	FW	CPV	Bryan Teixeira (to Sturm Graz)

== See also ==
- 2022–23 Austrian Football Bundesliga
