= Daniel Klicnik =

Austrian footballer

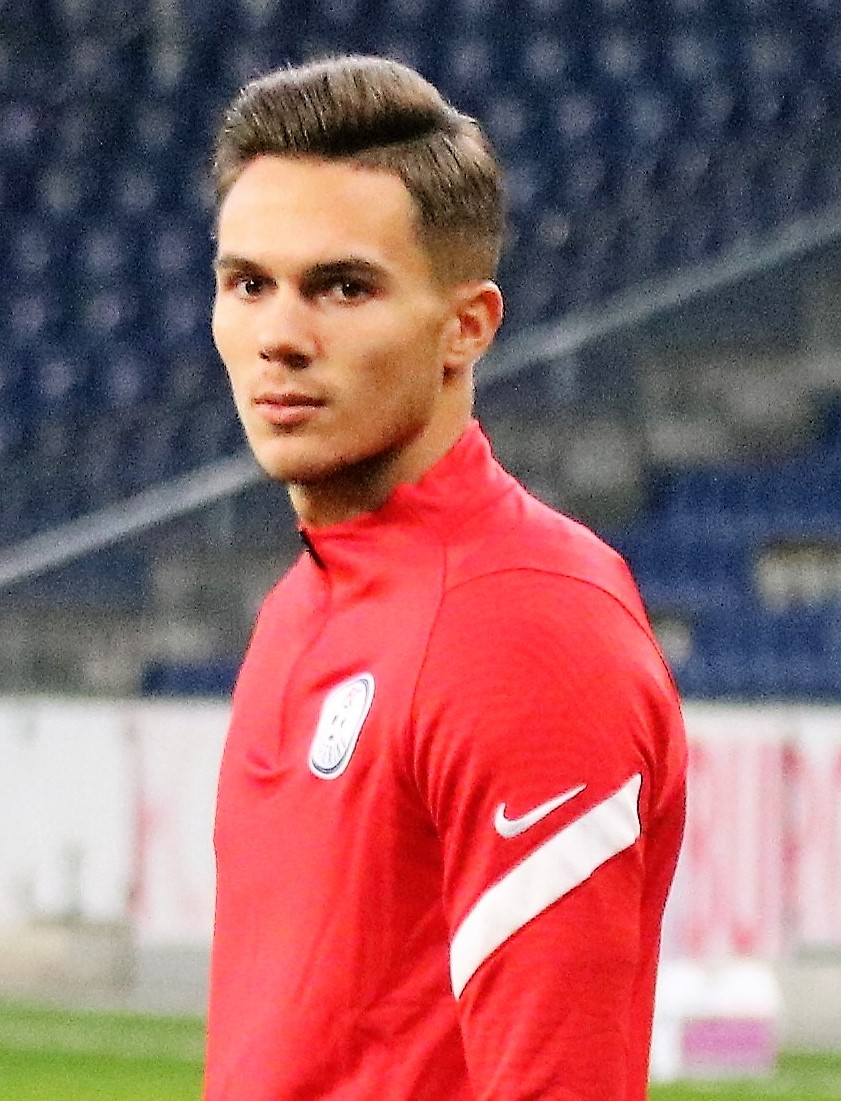

Personal information
- Date of birth: 31 May 2003 (age 23)
- Place of birth: Judenburg, Austria
- Height: 1.78 m (5 ft 10 in)
- Position: Defender

Youth career
- 2008–2015: FC Zeltweg
- 2015–2016: FC Judenburg
- 2016–2018: Sturm Graz
- 2018–2021: Red Bull Salzburg

Senior career*
Years	Team	Apps	(Gls)
2021–2023	FC Liefering	7	(0)

International career^{‡}
2018	Austria U15	5	(0)
2018–2019	Austria U16	6	(0)
- * Club domestic league appearances and goals as of 20 June 2023 ‡ National team caps and goals as of 22 October 2021

Daniel Klicnik (born 31 May 2003) is an Austrian professional footballer who plays as a defender.

== Career ==
He started his career with FC Zeltweg and went on to FC Judenburg. From 2016 to 2018 he played for the SK Sturm Graz Academy, and from 2018 till 2021 for the Red Bull Salzburg Academy. 2021 he was promoted to FC Liefering.

His debut for Liefering in the 2. Liga he gave in October 2021, when he came in for Samuel Major in the 11th round against FC Juniors OÖ.

== Career statistics ==
As of 22 October 2021.

Appearances and goals by club, season and competition
Club	Season	League			Cup		Continental		Other		Total	
Club	Season	Division	Apps	Goals	Apps	Goals	Apps	Goals	Apps	Goals	Apps	Goals
FC Liefering	2021–22	2. Liga	1	0	0	0	–		0	0	1	0
Career total			1	0	0	0	0	0	0	0	1	0
