= Adriel (footballer, born 1997) =

Brazilian footballer (born 1997)

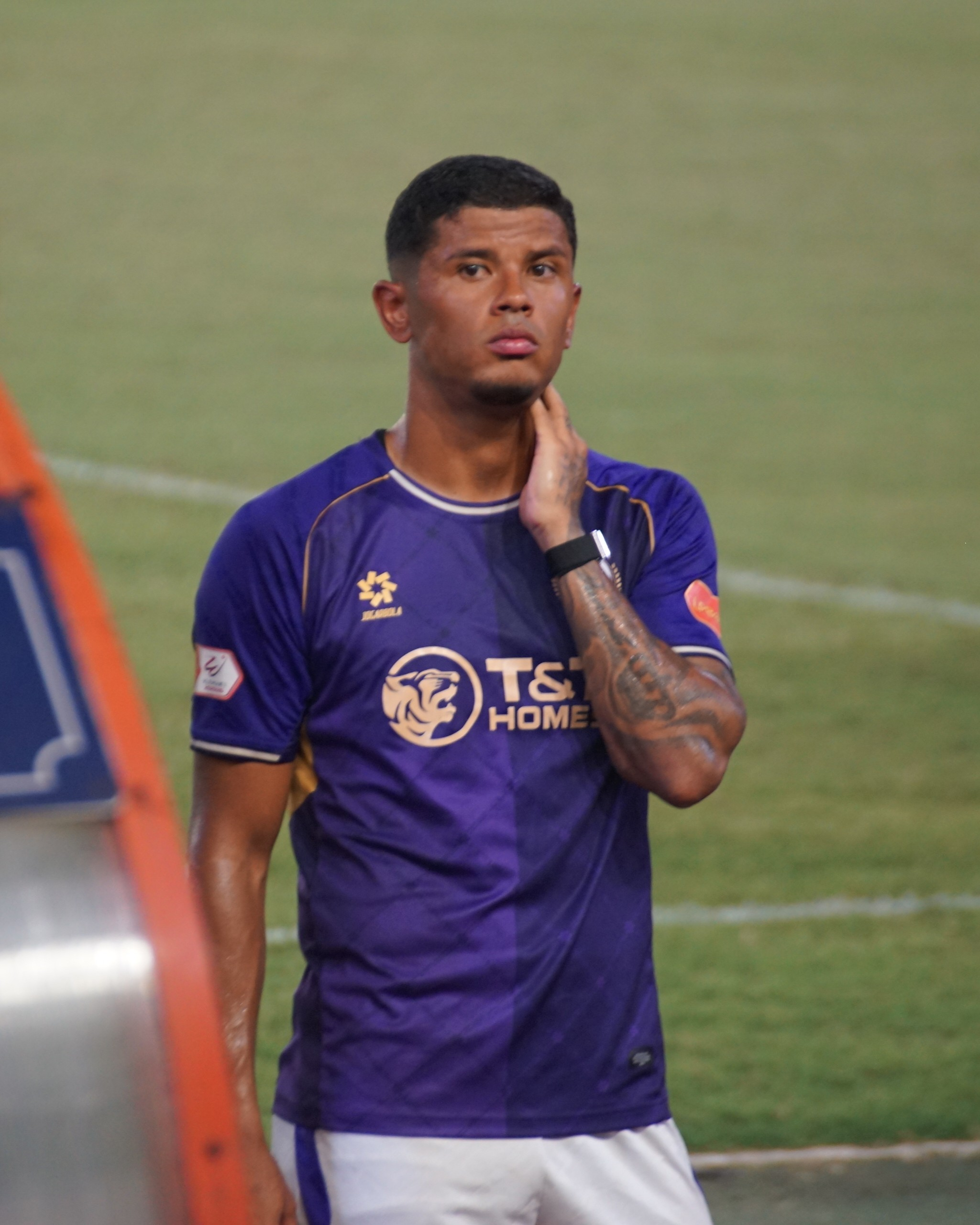
- Adriel in 2026

Personal information
- Full name: Adriel Tadeu Ferreira da Silva
- Date of birth: 22 May 1997 (age 29)
- Place of birth: São Paulo, Brazil
- Height: 1.84 m (6 ft 0 in)
- Position: Center-back

Team information
- Current team: Hanoi FC
- Number: 35

Youth career
- 2012–2017: Osasco Audax
- 2014: → Osasco FC (loan)

Senior career*
Years	Team	Apps	(Gls)
2016–2018	Osasco Audax	6	(0)
2018	→ Audax Rio (loan)	2	(0)
2019–2020	Gainare Tottori	17	(1)
2020–2021	Corinthians B		
2021	Paysandu		
2021–2023	Austria Lustenau	42	(1)
2023–2025	SW Bregenz	40	(4)
2025–	Hanoi FC	21	(0)
- * Club domestic league appearances and goals as of 7 June 2026

Adriel Tadeu Ferreira da Silva (born 22 May 1997), commonly known as Adriel, is a Brazilian professional footballer who plays as a center-back for V.League 1 club Hanoi FC.

== Club career ==
Adriel Silva used to play for some low-tier Brazilian clubs, Adriel Tadeu Ferreira da Silva went to play for Gainare Tottori in the 2019 J3 League. He scored only one goal in 18 games played in Japanese football. In October 2020, Silva joined Corinthians' U-23 team as a defensive midfielder. His contract was valid until March 2021.

On 11 August 2021 he signed a one-year contract with Austria Lustenau in Austria.

On 19 July 2023, Adriel moved to SW Bregenz. He played for this club 2 seasons.

On 20 July 2025, Adriel was transferred to Hanoi FC in the V.League 1.

== Career statistics ==
=== Club ===
As of 6 June 2019.

Club	Season	League			State League		National Cup		League Cup		Other		Total	
Club	Season	Division	Apps	Goals	Apps	Goals	Apps	Goals	Apps	Goals	Apps	Goals	Apps	Goals
Osasco Audax	2016	Série D	1	0	0	0	0	0	–		0	0	1	0
Osasco Audax	2017	Série D	0	0	0	0	0	0	–		0	0	0	0
Osasco Audax	2018	–			5 (Note: Appearances in the Campeonato Paulista A2)	0	0	0	–		0	0	5	0
Osasco Audax	Total		1	0	5	0	0	0	0	0	0	0	6	0
Audax Rio (loan)	2018	–			2 (Note: Appearances in the Campeonato Carioca A2)	0	0	0	–		6 (Note: Appearances in the Copa Rio)	1	8	1
Gainare Tottori	2019	J3 League	8	1	–		0	0	0	0	0	0	8	1
Career total			9	1	7	0	0	0	0	0	6	1	22	2

== Honours ==
Austria Lustenau

- Austrian Football Second League: 2021–22
