= Bryan Teixeira =

Cape Verdean footballer (born 2000)

Personal information
- Full name: Bryan Alberto Silva Teixeira Jr.
- Date of birth: 1 September 2000 (age 26)
- Place of birth: Savigny-le-Temple, France
- Height: 1.74 m (5 ft 9 in)
- Position: Winger

Team information
- Current team: Žalgiris
- Number: 70

Youth career
- –2017: Fleury 91
- 2017–2018: Clermont

Senior career*
Years	Team	Apps	(Gls)
2018–2022	Clermont II	22	(1)
2019–2022	Clermont	1	(0)
2020	→ Concarneau (loan)	5	(0)
2020–2021	→ Orléans (loan)	13	(0)
2021–2022	→ Austria Lustenau (loan)	23	(3)
2022–2023	Austria Lustenau	16	(6)
2023–2025	Sturm Graz	24	(0)
2024–2025	→ 1. FC Magdeburg (loan)	29	(2)
2026–	Žalgiris	20	(1)

International career^{‡}
2019	Cape Verde U20	1	(0)
2022–	Cape Verde	6	(1)
- * Club domestic league appearances and goals as of 7 July 2026 ‡ National team caps and goals as of 23:10, 22 January 2024 (UTC)

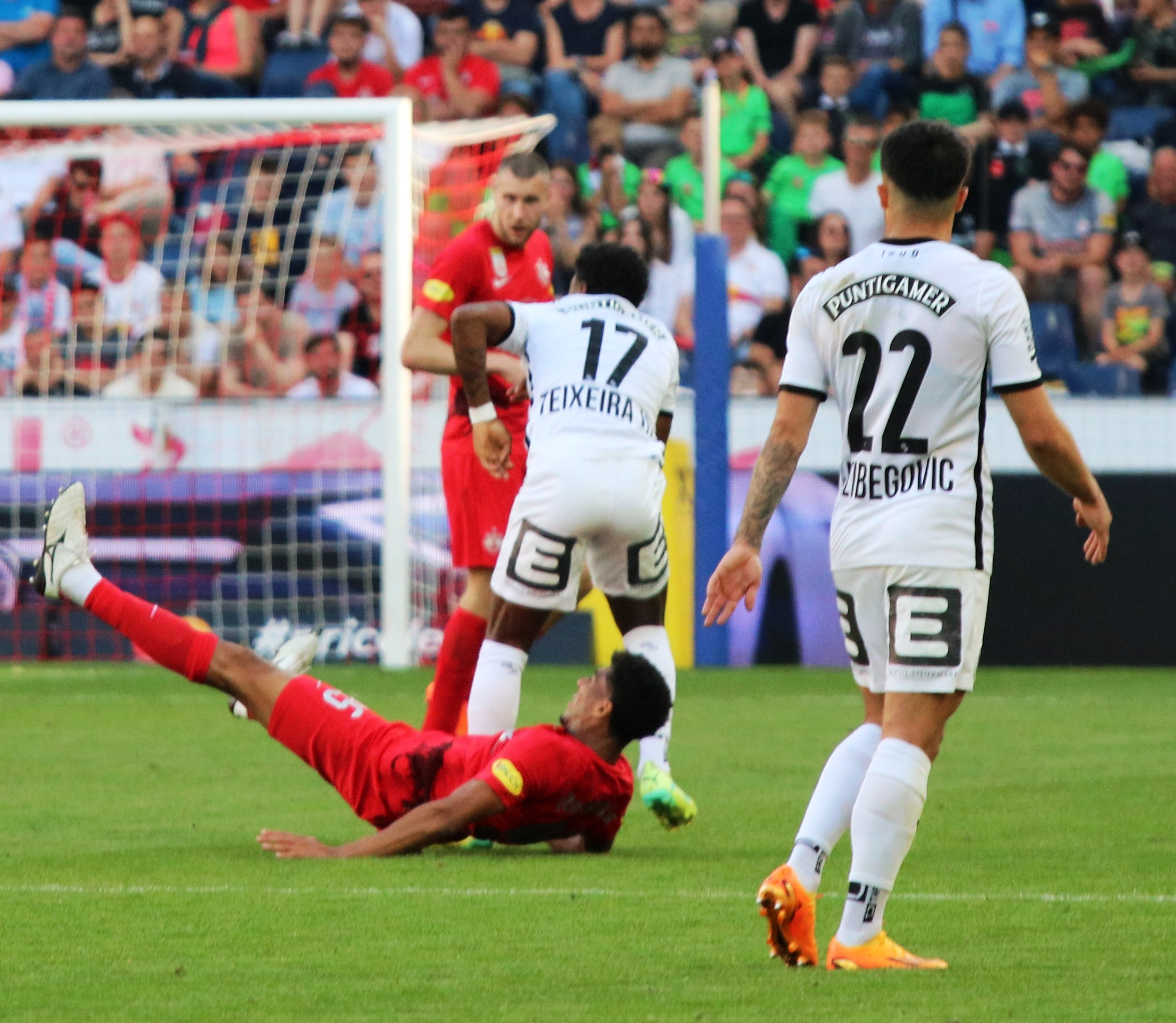

Bryan Alberto Silva Teixeira Jr. (Portuguese: [ˈbɾa.jɐn al.ˈbɛɾ.tu ˈsil.vɐ tej.ˈʃei.ɾɐ ˈʒu.ni.ɔɾ]; born 1 September 2000) is a professional footballer who plays as a winger for Lithuanian FK Žalgiris. Born in France, he plays for the Cape Verde national team.

== Career ==
On 17 July 2019, Teixeira signed his first professional contract with Clermont. He made his professional debut with Clermont in a 1–0 Ligue 2 win over on 2 November 2019.

He spent the second half of the 2019–20 season on loan at Concarneau. He made five appearances in Championnat National before the season was abandoned due to the COVID-19 pandemic.

In June 2020, he joined Orléans, newly relegated to Championnat National, on a season-long loan.

On 31 August 2021, he joined Austrian club Austria Lustenau on loan for the 2021–22 season. On 30 June 2022, Teixeira returned to Austria Lustenau on a permanent basis and signed a contract until the summer of 2024.

On 7 January 2023, Teixeira joined Sturm Graz on a contract until 2026. On 1 February 2024, Teixeira was loaned by 1. FC Magdeburg in Germany. The loan was extended for the 2024–25 season.

On 9 February 2026 officially announced that Bryan Teixeira signed with Lithuanian Žalgiris Club.

== International career ==
Born in France, Teixeira is of Cape Verdean descent. He debuted with the Cape Verde national team in a friendly 1–0 loss to Ecuador on 11 June 2022, coming on as a substitute.

== Career statistics ==
=== International ===
As of match played 3 February 2024

Appearances and goals by national team and year
National team	Year	Apps	Goals
Cape Verde	2022	2	0
Cape Verde	2023	4	0
Cape Verde	2024	2	1
Total		8	1

Scores and results list Cape Verde's goal tally first, score column indicates score after each Teixeira goal.

List of international goals scored by Bryan Teixeira
No.	Date	Venue	Opponent	Score	Result	Competition	Ref.
1	22 January 2024	Felix Houphouet Boigny Stadium, Abidjan, Ivory Coast	Egypt	2–2	2–2	2023 Africa Cup of Nations	

== Honours ==
Austria Lustenau

- Austrian Football Second League: 2021–22
