= Anthony Schmid =

Footballer (born 1999)

Personal information
- Date of birth: 18 January 1999 (age 27)
- Place of birth: Strasbourg, France
- Height: 1.83 m (6 ft 0 in)
- Position: Forward

Team information
- Current team: Floridsdorfer AC
- Number: 7

Youth career
- Strasbourg
- Offenburger FV
- 2013–2018: SC Freiburg

Senior career*
Years	Team	Apps	(Gls)
2018–2020	SC Freiburg II	19	(2)
2020–2022	Floridsdorfer AC	33	(15)
2022–2024	Austria Lustenau	46	(6)
2024	Swift Hesperange	3	(1)
2024–	Floridsdorfer AC	30	(5)

International career^{‡}
2016	Austria U18	4	(0)
2018	Austria U19	4	(2)
2018	Austria U21	2	(0)
- * Club domestic league appearances and goals as of 15 October 2025 ‡ National team caps and goals as of 02:01, 9 September 2022 (UTC)

Anthony Schmid (born 18 January 1999) is a professional footballer who plays as a forward for Floridsdorfer AC. Born in France, he is a youth international for Austria.

== Club career ==
Schmid is a youth product of the academy of the French club Strasbourg. He then moved to Germany with the youth academy of Offenburger FV, before moving to SC Freiburg's youth side in 2013. He began his senior career with the SC Freiburg reserves in 2018. On 25 August 2020, he moved to the Austrian club Floridsdorfer AC. On 20 May 2021, he extended his contract with the club for one more year after 3 goals in 25 games in his debut season in the 2. Liga. He broke out his second season with Floridsdorfer with 11 goals in 28 appearances, and came in second in the 2. Liga narrowly avoiding promotion. He transferred to their newly promoted rivals Austria Lustenau on 27 May 2022 for their campaign in the 2022–23 Austrian Football Bundesliga, signing a three-year contract.

After a short stint in Luxembourg in the summer of 2024 with Swift Hesperange, he left Swift for personal reasons. On 4 September 2024, Schmid returned to Floridsdorfer AC.

== International career ==
Born in France, Schmid elected to represent Austria internationally in 2016. He has played up to the Austria U21s.

== Personal life ==
Schmid was born in Strasbourg, France to an Austrian father and a French mother from Alsace. His maternal grandfather is Algerian. He is the brother of the French professional footballer Jonathan Schmid.
