= Torben Rhein =

German footballer

Personal information
- Full name: Torben Bjarne Rhein
- Date of birth: 12 January 2003 (age 23)
- Place of birth: Berlin, Germany
- Height: 1.73 m (5 ft 8 in)
- Position: Midfielder

Team information
- Current team: Emmen
- Number: 7

Youth career
- –2009: FC Stern Marienfelde
- 2009–2017: Hertha BSC
- 2017–2022: Bayern Munich

Senior career*
Years	Team	Apps	(Gls)
2020–2024	Bayern Munich II	30	(1)
2022–2024	→ Austria Lustenau (loan)	42	(0)
2024	→ Austria Lustenau II (loan)	1	(0)
2024–	Emmen	37	(1)

International career^{‡}
2018	Germany U15	2	(0)
2018–2019	Germany U16	6	(1)
2019–2020	Germany U17	10	(3)
2020	Germany U18	1	(0)
2021–2022	Germany U19	7	(1)
- * Club domestic league appearances and goals as of 4 February 2026 ‡ National team caps and goals as of 16:35, 21 November 2023 (UTC)

Torben Bjarne Rhein (born 12 January 2003) is a German professional footballer who plays as a midfielder for Eerste Divisie club Emmen. He was included in The Guardian's "Next Generation 2020".

== Career statistics ==
=== Club ===
As of 9 May 2025

Appearances and goals by club, season and competition
Club	Season	League			Cup (Note: Includes Austrian Cup)		Other		Total	
Club	Season	Division	Apps	Goals	Apps	Goals	Apps	Goals	Apps	Goals
Bayern Munich II	2019–20	3. Liga	1	0	—		—		1	0
Bayern Munich II	2020–21	3. Liga	12	1	—		—		12	1
Bayern Munich II	2021–22	Regionalliga Bayern	18	0	—		—		18	0
Bayern Munich II	Total		30	1	—		—		30	1
Austria Lustenau (loan)	2022–23	Austrian Bundesliga	21	0	2	0	3 (Note: Appearances in Austrian Bundesliga play-out)	0	26	0
Austria Lustenau (loan)	2023–24	Austrian Bundesliga	21	0	2	1	0	0	23	1
Austria Lustenau (loan)	Total		42	0	4	1	3	0	49	1
Austria Lustenau II (loan)	2023–24	Eliteliga Vorarlberg	1	0	—		—		1	0
Emmen	2024–25	Eerste Divisie	36	1	—		—		36	1
Career total			109	2	4	1	3	0	116	3

== Honours ==
Individual

- Fritz Walter Medal U17 Silver: 2020
