= Markus Mader =

Austrian football player and manager

Personal information
- Date of birth: 19 May 1968 (age 58)

Team information
- Current team: SC Austria Lustenau (manager)

Senior career*
Years	Team	Apps	(Gls)
1986	IG Bregenz/Dornbirn II		
1986–1987	IG Bregenz/Dornbirn		
1987–1990	Schwarz-Weiß Bregenz		
1990–1991	FC Hard		
1991	de:FC Wolfurt		
1992–2002	FC Hard		
2002–2004	Admira Dornbirn		
2004–2006	FC Egg		
2013	FC Langenegg		

Managerial career
- 2006–2008: FC Egg
- 2008–2009: Blau-Weiß Feldkirch
- 2010–2012: FC Hard
- 2012–2015: FC Langenegg
- 2015–2016: SC Hatlerdorf
- 2016–2017: Schwarzach
- 2017–2021: FC Dornbirn
- 2021–2023: SC Austria Lustenau
- 2023–2024: SW Bregenz
- 2024–: SC Austria Lustenau
- * Club domestic league appearances and goals

Markus Mader (born 19 May 1968) is an Austrian football manager and former player who manages SC Austria Lustenau.

== Career ==
Mader played for different clubs in Vorarlberg. With IG Bregenz/Dornbirn he played in the Second League.

After the end of his player career he became manager of different clubs in Vorarlberg. In the 2017–18 season he became coach of FC Dornbirn in the Regionalliga. With the club he was promoted 2019 to the Second League. In 2019–20 they finished 12th, and 7th in 2020–21. For the 2021–2 season, he became coach of Austria Lustenau. They won the league and were promoted to the Austrian Football Bundesliga for the first time in 22 years. Austria finished 8th in their first Bundesliga season under Mader management in 2022–23. However, they started the 2023–24 season with 3 draws and 11 losses in their first 14 games, and Mader was dismissed by the club on 13 November 2023. On 30 November 2024, Mader returned to SC Austria Lustenau on a contract until the summer of 2026.

== Honours ==
Austria Lustenau

- 2. Liga: 2021–22
