= Hakim Guenouche =

French footballer (born 2000)

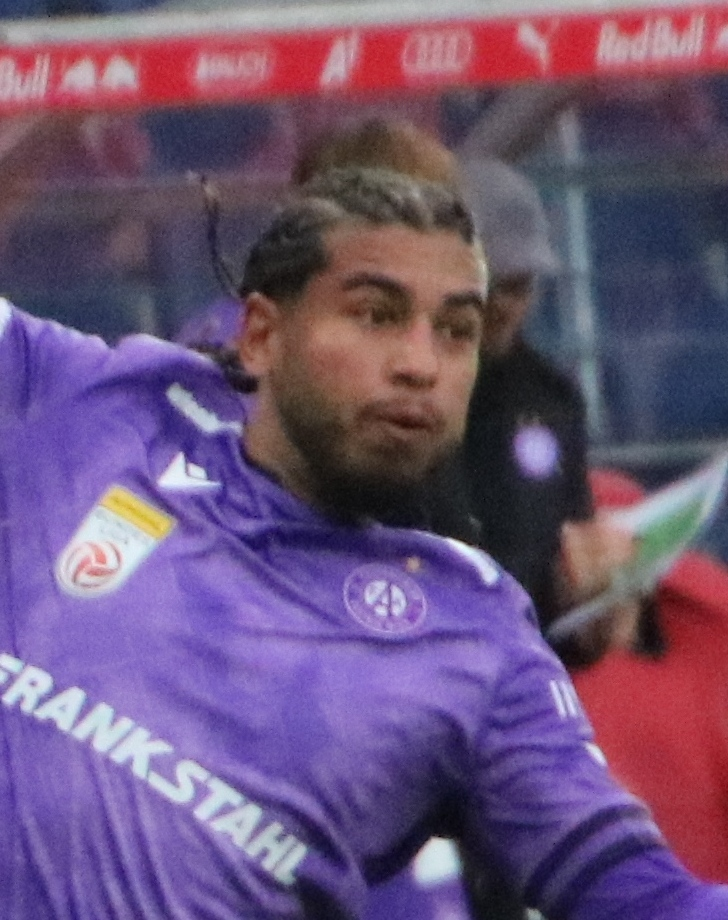
- Guenouche in 2024

Personal information
- Date of birth: 30 May 2000 (age 26)
- Place of birth: Nancy, France
- Height: 1.68 m (5 ft 6 in)
- Position: Left-back

Youth career
- 2006–2018: Nancy

Senior career*
Years	Team	Apps	(Gls)
2018–2019	FC Zürich	2	(0)
2019–2020	KFC Uerdingen 05	9	(0)
2021–2023	Austria Lustenau	57	(2)
2023–2026	Austria Wien	50	(1)

International career^{‡}
2015–2016	France U16	5	(0)
2016–2017	France U17	10	(0)
- * Club domestic league appearances and goals as of 1 June 2026 ‡ National team caps and goals as of 31 December 2018

Hakim Guenouche (born 30 May 2000) is a French professional footballer who plays as a left-back.

== Club career ==
In June 2018, Guenouche signed a three-year deal with FC Zürich, leaving youth club AS Nancy. He made his competitive debut for the club on 31 October 2018, playing the full 90 minutes of FC Zürich's 3–2 away victory over Red Star Zürich in the Swiss Cup.

In July 2019, KFC Uerdingen 05 of the 3. Liga announced the signing of Guenouche.

On 14 July 2021, he joined Austria Lustenau in Austria on a two-year contract.

On 19 June 2023, Guenouche signed a three-year contract with Austria Wien.

== International career ==
Born in France, Guenouche holds both French and Algerian nationalities. He is a youth international for France.

== Honours ==
Austria Lustenau

- Austrian Football Second League: 2021–22
