= Fabian Gmeiner =

Austrian footballer (born 1997)

Personal information
- Date of birth: 27 January 1997 (age 29)
- Place of birth: Dornbirn, Austria
- Height: 1.77 m (5 ft 10 in)
- Position: Full-back

Team information
- Current team: Austria Lustenau
- Number: 7

Youth career
- 2005–2010: Dornbirner SV
- 2010: AKA Vorarlberg
- 2011–2016: VfB Stuttgart

Senior career*
Years	Team	Apps	(Gls)
2016–2017	NEC	1	(0)
2017–2019	Hamburger SV II	48	(3)
2019–2020	Sportfreunde Lotte	23	(0)
2020–	Austria Lustenau	162	(0)

International career
2012–2013	Austria U16	3	(2)
2013–2014	Austria U17	13	(1)
2014–2015	Austria U18	6	(0)
2015–2016	Austria U19	12	(0)
2018	Austria U21	2	(0)
- * Club domestic league appearances and goals as of 17 May 2026

Fabian Gmeiner (born 27 January 1997) is an Austrian professional footballer who plays as a right-back for Austria Lustenau.

== Club career ==
On 5 August 2020, he signed a two-year contract with Austria Lustenau.

== Honours ==
Austria Lustenau

- Austrian Football Second League: 2021–22
