= Cem Türkmen =

German-Turkish footballer

Personal information
- Full name: Cem Tuna Türkmen
- Date of birth: 29 March 2002 (age 24)
- Place of birth: Cologne, Germany
- Height: 1.78 m (5 ft 10 in)
- Position: Midfielder

Team information
- Current team: Bandırmaspor
- Number: 18

Youth career
- –2009: SuS Nippes
- 2009–2021: Bayer Leverkusen

Senior career*
Years	Team	Apps	(Gls)
2020–2021	Bayer Leverkusen	0	(0)
2021–2023	Clermont	0	(0)
2021–2023	→ Austria Lustenau (loan)	57	(1)
2023–2025	Ankaragücü	30	(0)
2025–	Bandırmaspor	8	(0)

International career^{‡}
2019	Turkey U17	1	(0)
2022–2023	Turkey U21	10	(0)
- * Club domestic league appearances and goals as of 8 February 2026 ‡ National team caps and goals as of 17 October 2023

Cem Tuna Türkmen (born 29 March 2002) is a footballer who plays as a midfielder for TFF 1. Lig club Bandırmaspor. Born in Germany, Türkmen is a former youth international for Turkey.

== Career ==
Türkmen made his professional debut for Bayer Leverkusen in the UEFA Europa League on 3 December 2020, coming on as a substitute in the 67th minute for Nadiem Amiri against Ligue 1 side Nice. The away match finished as a 3–2 win for Leverkusen.

On 12 July 2021, Türkmen signed with Ligue 1 club Clermont Foot on a free transfer and then immediately loaned to Austrian club Austria Lustenau.

On July 28, 2023, he signed a 3-year contract with Süper Lig club Ankaragücü.

== Honours ==
Austria Lustenau

- Austrian Football Second League: 2021–22
