= Domenik Schierl =

Austrian footballer

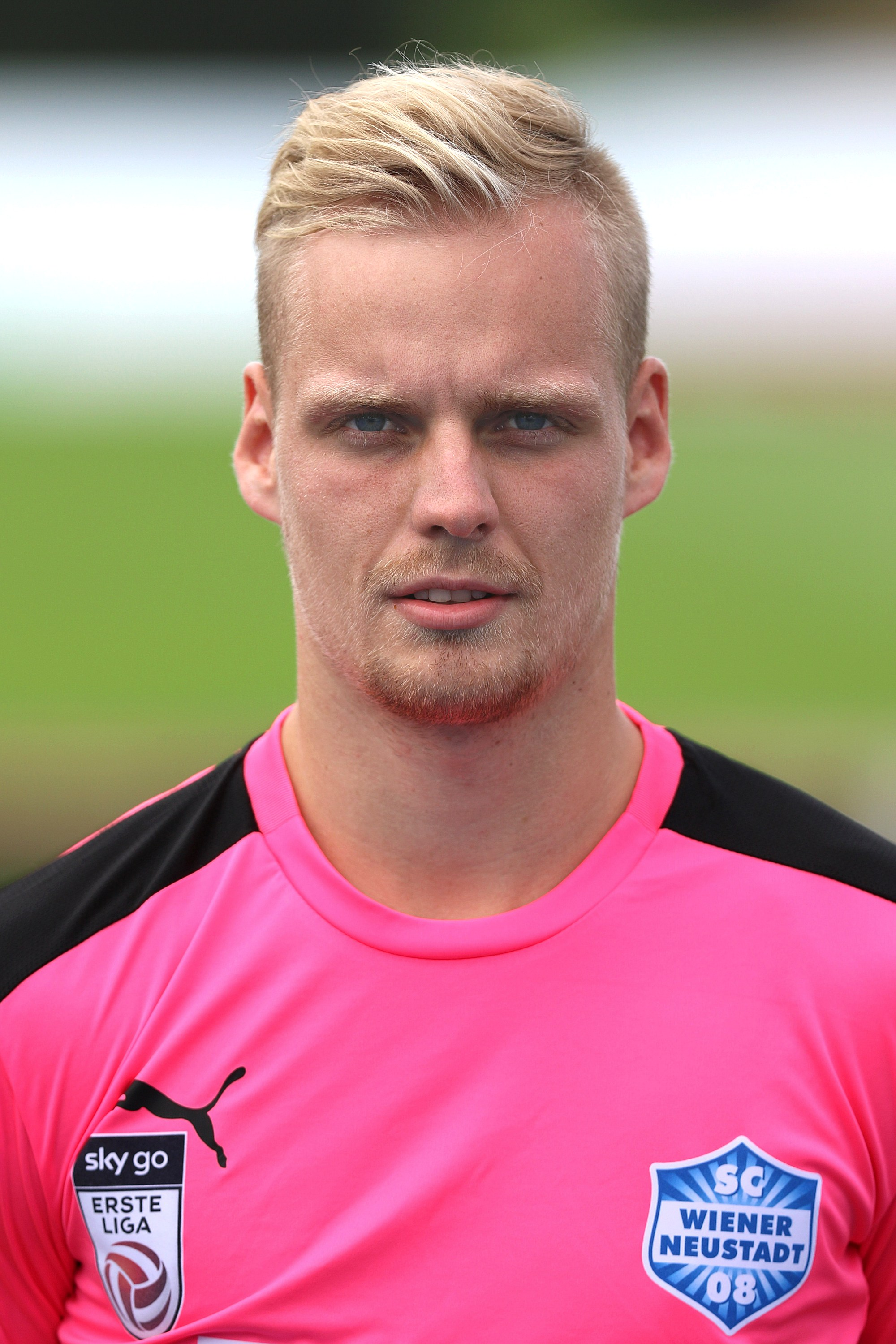
- Domenik Schierl in 2017

Personal information
- Date of birth: 20 July 1994 (age 32)
- Place of birth: Austria
- Position: Goalkeeper

Team information
- Current team: Austria Lustenau
- Number: 27

Youth career
- 2001–2007: TSV St. Johann im Pongau
- 2007–2011: FC Red Bull Salzburg

Senior career*
Years	Team	Apps	(Gls)
2011–2013	Red Bull Juniors	4	(0)
2013–2014	FC Liefering	13	(0)
2014–2019	Wiener Neustadt	128	(0)
2019–	Austria Lustenau	198	(0)
- * Club domestic league appearances and goals as of 17 May 2026

Domenik Schierl (born 20 July 1994) is an Austrian footballer who plays as a goalkeeper for SC Austria Lustenau.

== Career ==
Schierl began with TSV St. Johann im Pongau with football and moved in December 2007 to FC Red Bull Salzburg. He went through the junior classes and in 2011 was second goalkeeper behind Thomas Dähne at the FC Liefering and thereafter at FC Liefering. On August 16, 2013, he made his First League debut in the goal of FC Liefering at 3: 0 home win against SV Horn.

At the end of the 2013/14 season he transferred to SC Wiener Neustadt in the Erste Liga.

== Honours ==
Austria Lustenau

- Austrian Football Second League: 2021–22
