= Tobias Berger =

Austrian footballer (born 2001)

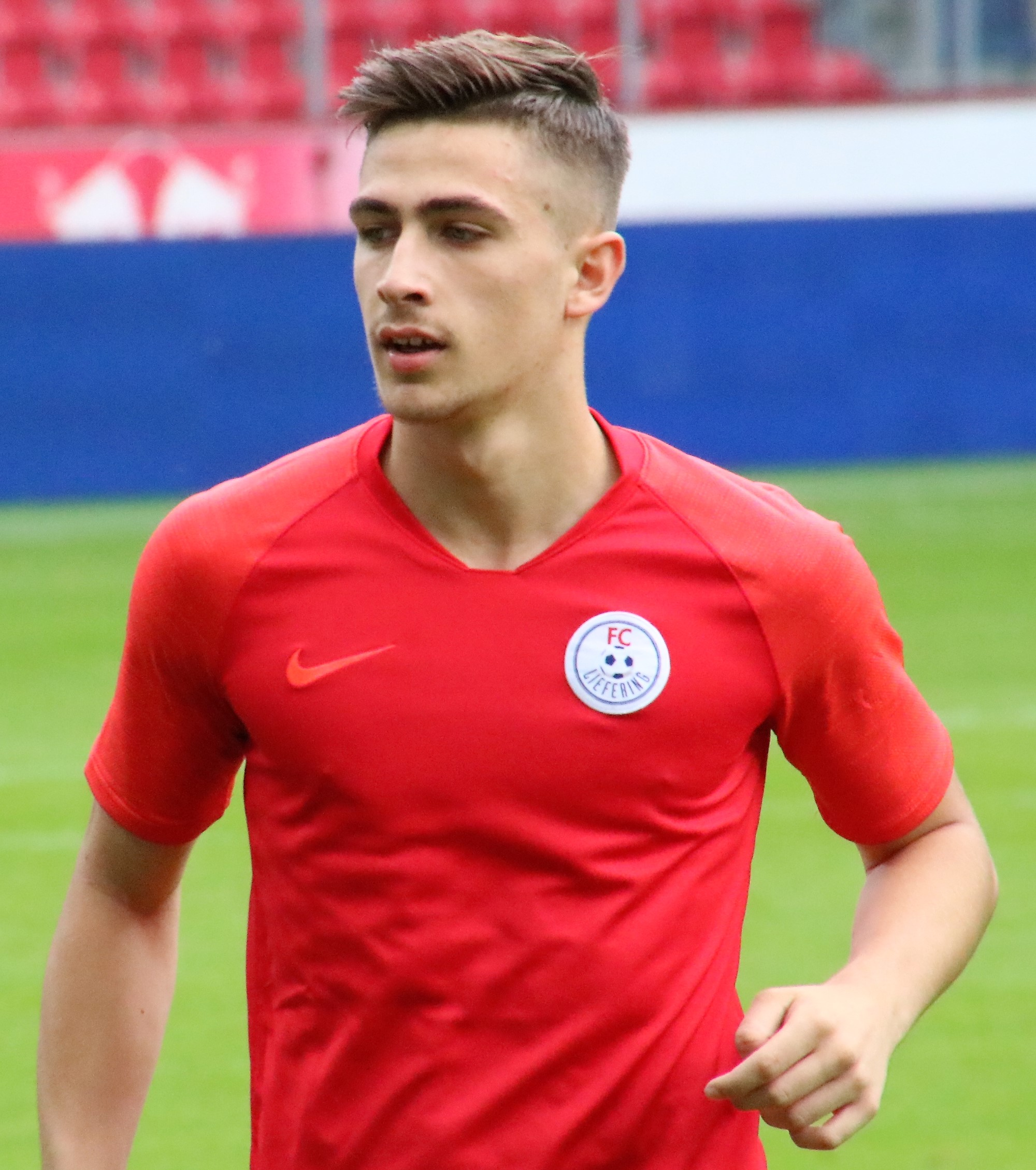

Personal information
- Date of birth: 2 November 2001 (age 25)
- Place of birth: Schwarzach im Pongau, Austria
- Height: 1.85 m (6 ft 1 in)
- Position: Left-back

Team information
- Current team: FC Wacker Innsbruck
- Number: 25

Youth career
- 2010–2012: UPS Dorfgastein
- 2012–2015: SC Bad Hofgastein
- 2015–2018: Red Bull Salzburg

Senior career*
Years	Team	Apps	(Gls)
2019–2020	FC Liefering	6	(0)
2020–2025	Austria Lustenau	86	(2)
2025–	FC Wacker Innsbruck	0	(0)

International career
2018	Austria U17	2	(0)
2018	Austria U18	4	(0)
2019	Austria U19	3	(0)
- * Club domestic league appearances and goals as of 25 May 2025

Tobias Berger (born 2 November 2001) is an Austrian professional footballer who plays as a left-back for 2. Liga club FC Wacker Innsbruck.

== Club career ==
=== Early career ===
Berger began his career in 2010 with the youth academy of UPS Dorfgastein. He made his professional debut playing for Red Bull Salzburg's feeder team, FC Liefering, against FC Wacker Innsbruck II on 29 May 2019.

=== Austria Lustenau ===
On 7 January 2020, Berger joined SC Austria Lustenau on a deal until the summer 2021.

== International career ==
Berger has represented Austria in various youth levels. He currently plays for the Austria under-18.

== Honours ==
Red Bull Salzburg Youth

- Jugendliga U18: 2019

Austria Lustenau

- Austrian Football Second League: 2021–22
