= Matthias Maak =

Austrian footballer

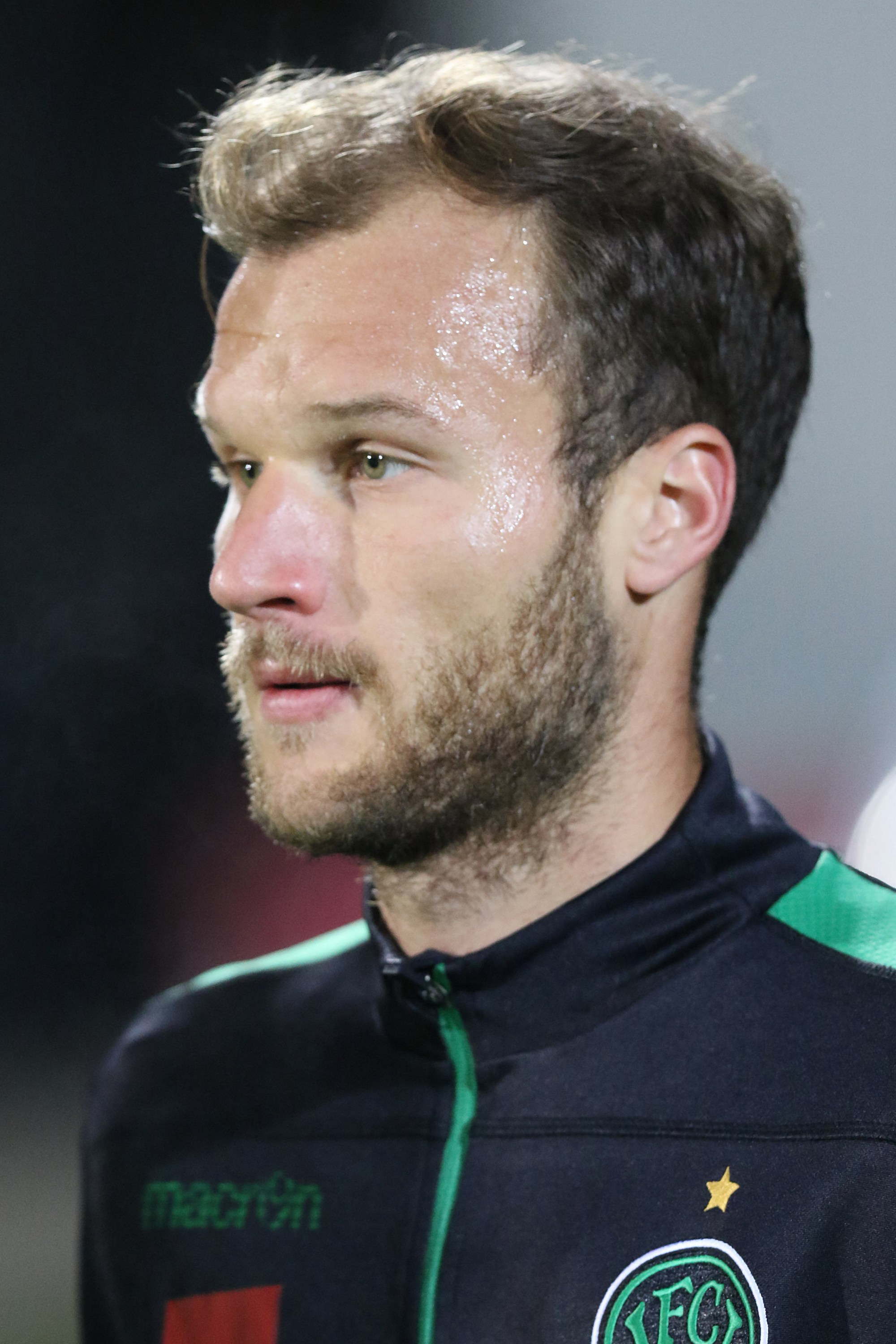

Personal information
- Date of birth: 12 May 1992 (age 34)
- Place of birth: Bruck an der Mur, Austria
- Height: 1.91 m (6 ft 3 in)
- Position: Centre back

Team information
- Current team: Austria Lustenau
- Number: 31

Youth career
- 1999–2006: TuS Krieglach
- 2006–2009: Austria Wien

Senior career*
Years	Team	Apps	(Gls)
2009–2010	SV Wienerberg	24	(0)
2010–2013	Wiener Neustadt	45	(0)
2010	→ Neusiedl/See	10	(0)
2013–2015	Kapfenberger SV	13	(1)
2014–2015	→ SV Grödig (loan)	33	(1)
2015–2016	SV Grödig	29	(2)
2016–2017	Sønderjyske	12	(0)
2017–2019	Wacker Innsbruck	61	(3)
2019–2020	Rheindorf Altach	16	(1)
2020–	Austria Lustenau	142	(5)

International career
2012–2013	Austria U-21	7	(0)
- * Club domestic league appearances and goals as of 17 May 2026

Matthias Maak (born 12 May 1992) is an Austrian footballer who plays for Austria Lustenau.

== Club career ==
On 27 August 2020, he signed with Austria Lustenau.

== Honours ==
Wacker Innsbruck

- Austrian Football First League: 2017–18

Austria Lustenau

- Austrian Football Second League: 2021–22
