= Pius Grabher =

Austrian footballer

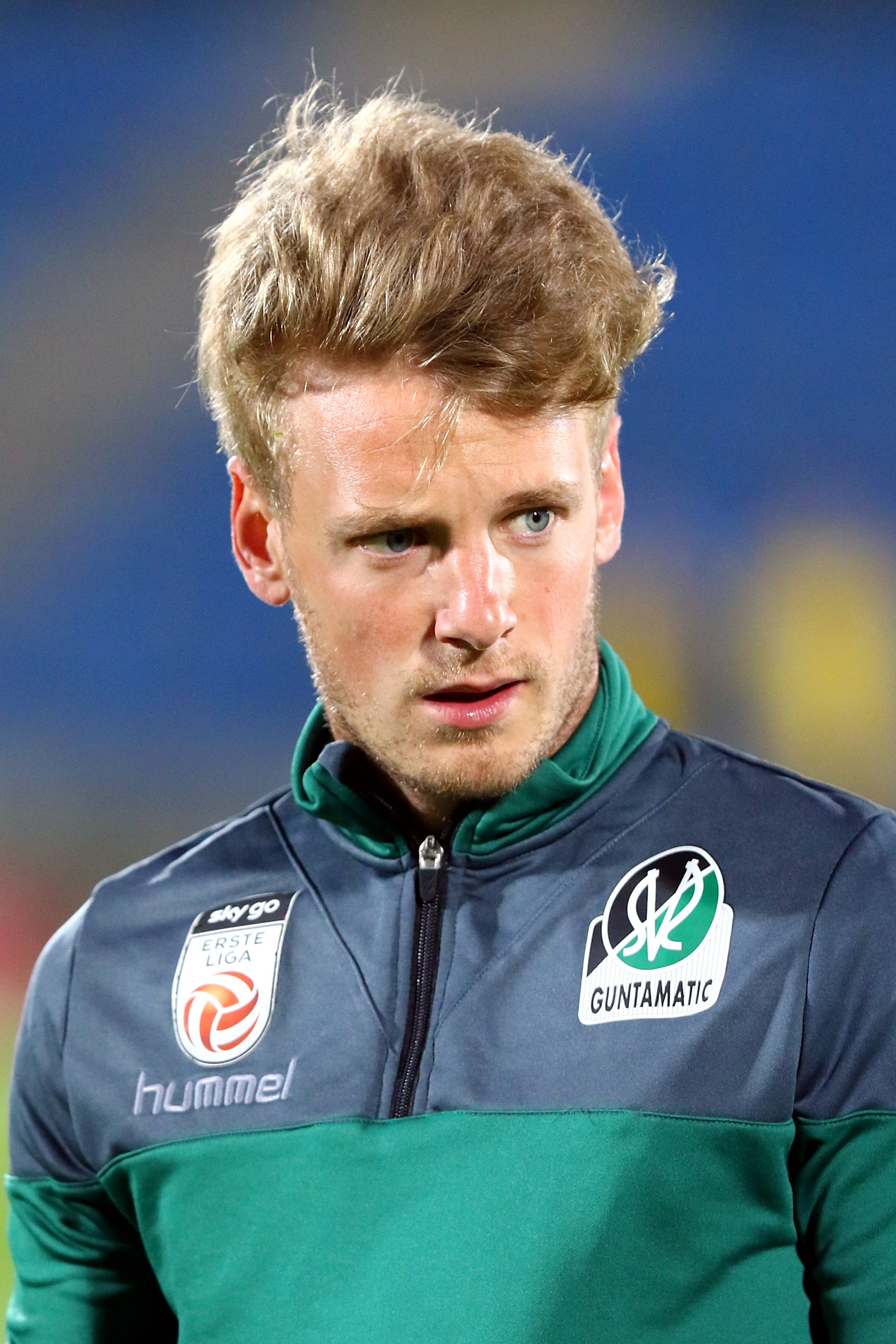

Personal information
- Date of birth: 11 August 1993 (age 33)
- Place of birth: Lustenau, Austria
- Height: 1.70 m (5 ft 7 in)
- Position: Midfielder

Team information
- Current team: Austria Lustenau
- Number: 23

Youth career
- 2001–2009: Austria Lustenau

Senior career*
Years	Team	Apps	(Gls)
2010–2014	Austria Lustenau	36	(3)
2014–2015	St. Gallen U21	23	(4)
2015–2017	Austria Lustenau	64	(7)
2017–2019	Ried	32	(1)
2019–	Austria Lustenau	187	(6)
- * Club domestic league appearances and goals as of 17 May 2026

Pius Grabher (born 11 August 1993) is an Austrian footballer who plays as a midfielder for Austria Lustenau.

== Honours ==
Austria Lustenau

- Austrian Football Second League: 2021–22
