= Darijo Grujčić =

Austrian footballer (born 1999)

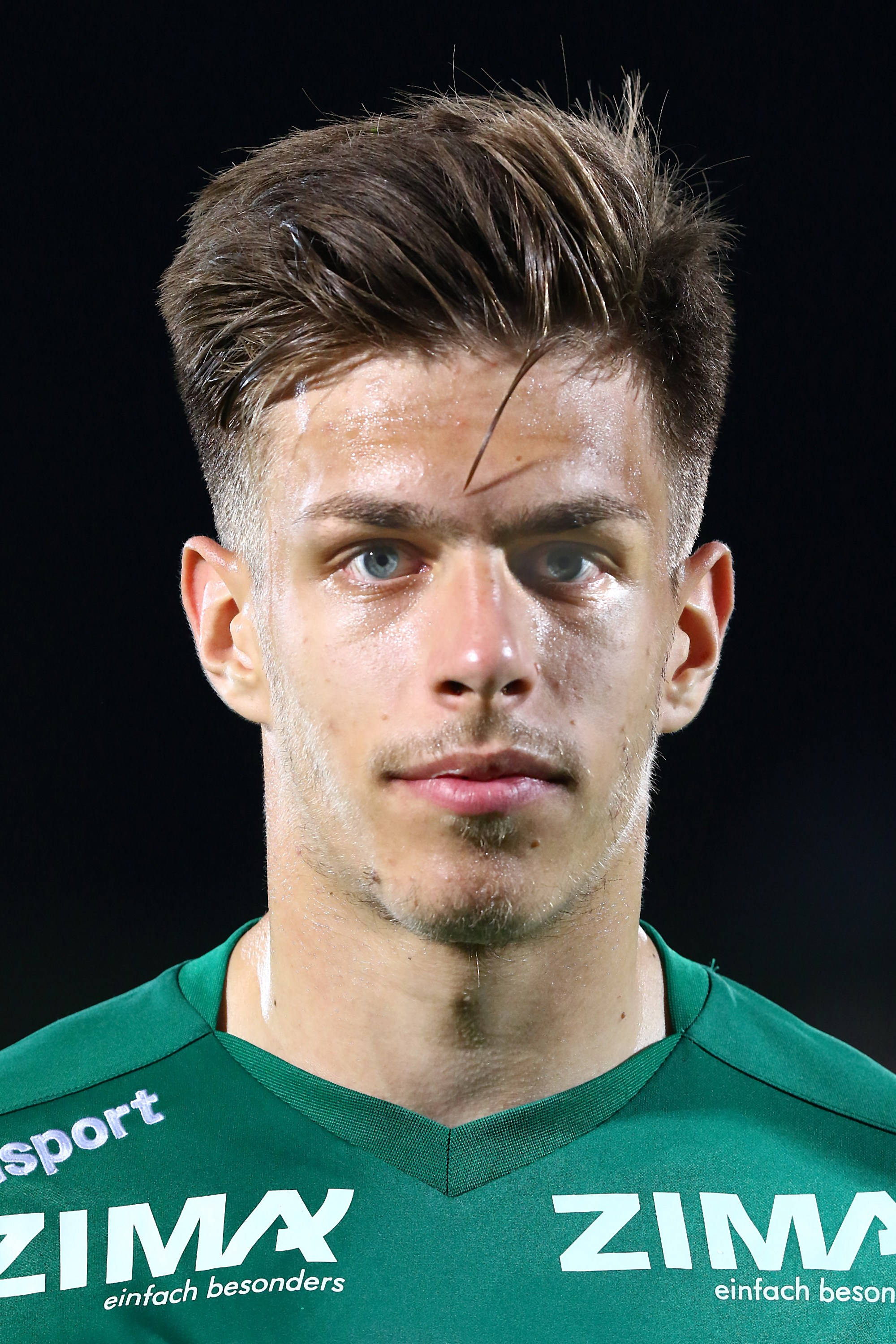
- Grujčić in 2018

Personal information
- Date of birth: 19 May 1999 (age 27)
- Place of birth: Lustenau, Austria
- Height: 1.88 m (6 ft 2 in)
- Position: Centre-back

Team information
- Current team: Wisła Kraków
- Number: 29

Youth career
- 2007–2013: Austria Lustenau
- 2013–2017: AKA Vorarlberg

Senior career*
Years	Team	Apps	(Gls)
2017–2028	Dornbirn	30	(2)
2018–2020	Austria Lustenau	43	(0)
2019	Austria Lustenau II	2	(0)
2020–2022	Wacker Innsbruck	40	(1)
2022–2024	Austria Lustenau	49	(4)
2024–2025	Fortuna Sittard	14	(0)
2025–	Wisła Kraków	23	(1)

International career
2016	Austria U18	4	(0)
2018	Austria U19	4	(2)
2018	Austria U21	2	(0)
- * Club domestic league appearances and goals as of 13:44, 26 May 2026 (UTC)

Darijo Grujčić (born 19 May 1999) is an Austrian professional footballer who plays as a centre-back for Polish Ekstraklasa club Wisła Kraków.

== Career ==
Grujčić is a youth product of Austria Lustenau and AKA Vorarlberg. He began his senior career with Dornbirn in the Austrian Regionalliga in 2017. On 30 November 2017, he signed a pre-contract with his childhood club Austria Lustenau that ran from January 2018 to June 2020. When his contract expired, he moved to Wacker Innsbruck in the summer of 2020. Wacker Innsbruck ran into financial issues in the summer of 2022, and on 27 April 2022 Grujčić was free to leave the club on a free transfer. On 31 May 2022, he once again transferred to Austria Lustenau as they were newly promoted to the Austrian Football Bundesliga for the 2022–23 season.

On 26 June 2024, Grujčić signed with Fortuna Sittard in the Netherlands for two seasons, with an optional third season.

On 2 July 2025, Grujčić moved to Polish second division club Wisła Kraków on a two-year deal, with an option for a third year.

== Personal life ==
Grujčić's father, Darko, is a retired footballer.

== Honours ==
Wisła Kraków

- I liga: 2025–26
