= Reichshofstadion =

Multi-use stadium in Lustenau, Austria

Coordinates: 47°25′16″N 9°39′10″E

Sun Minimeal Arena
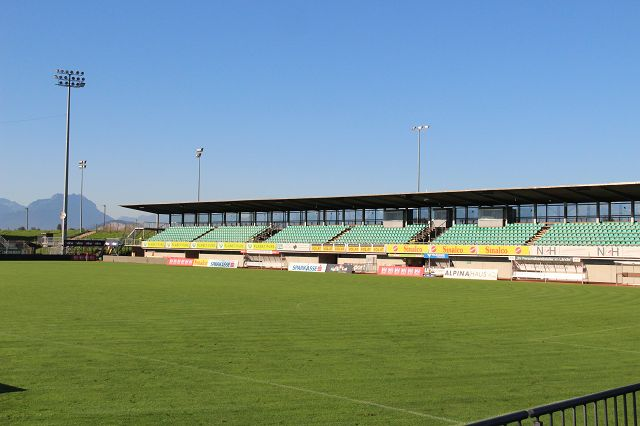
- Reichshofstadion 2019
- Interactive map of Sun Minimeal Arena
- Former names: Planet Pure Stadion (2018–2021); Reichshofstadion (1958–2018 and 2023–2025)
- Location: Lustenau, Austria
- Owner: City of Lustenau
- Capacity: 5,138 (before the most recent renovation)
- Surface: Grass
- Field size: 105 x 68m

Construction
- Opened: 1951
- Renovated: 1995, 2000, 2023–2025

Tenant
- Austria Lustenau

Reichshofstadion, commonly known as Sun Minimeal Arena for sponsorship reasons, is a multi-use stadium in Lustenau, Austria, built in 1951. It is currently used mostly for football matches and is the home ground of SC Austria Lustenau. The stadium (before the 2023–2025 renovation) holds 5,138 people, of which 3,094 seats and 2,044 standing.

== History ==
The stadium was built in 1951. In 1953 the stadium received its first real grandstand. In 1995 the main grandstand was rebuilt and in 2000 the natural turf pitch was given underfloor heating. Originally the stadium had an athletics facility, but this had to give way to additional stands, so today the facility is de facto used as a pure football stadium.

It offers space for a total of 8,800 spectators, of which 2,126 are covered seats, 2,390 are covered standing and 4,284 are uncovered standing.

In February 2018, the "Reichshofstadion" was renamed "Planet Pure Stadium" after a change of sponsor. Planet Pure is a company that has dedicated itself to the development and production of ecological detergents and cleaning agents.

In 2025–26 season, Reichshofstadion will be rename to Sun Minimeal Arena.

== Hugo Kleinbrod Chapel ==
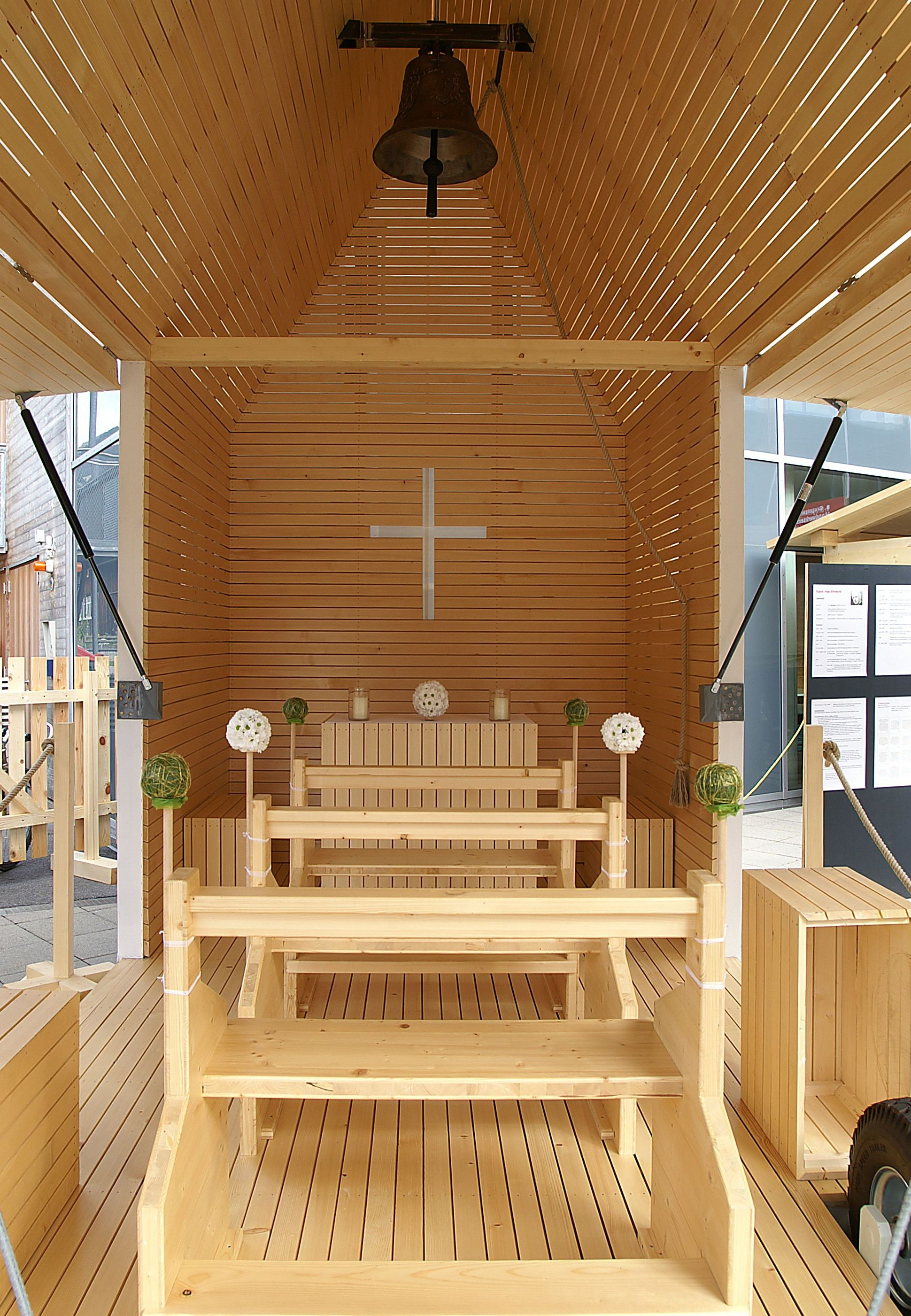
Hugo Kleinbrod Chapel

On August 3, 2007, the Hugo Kleinbrod Chapel was opened in the Reichshof Stadium. The Stadium is the first in Austria to have its own chapel, so fans of SC Austria Lustenau can now get married in the stadium or have their children baptized.
