= Lukas Fridrikas =

Austrian association footballer (born 1997)

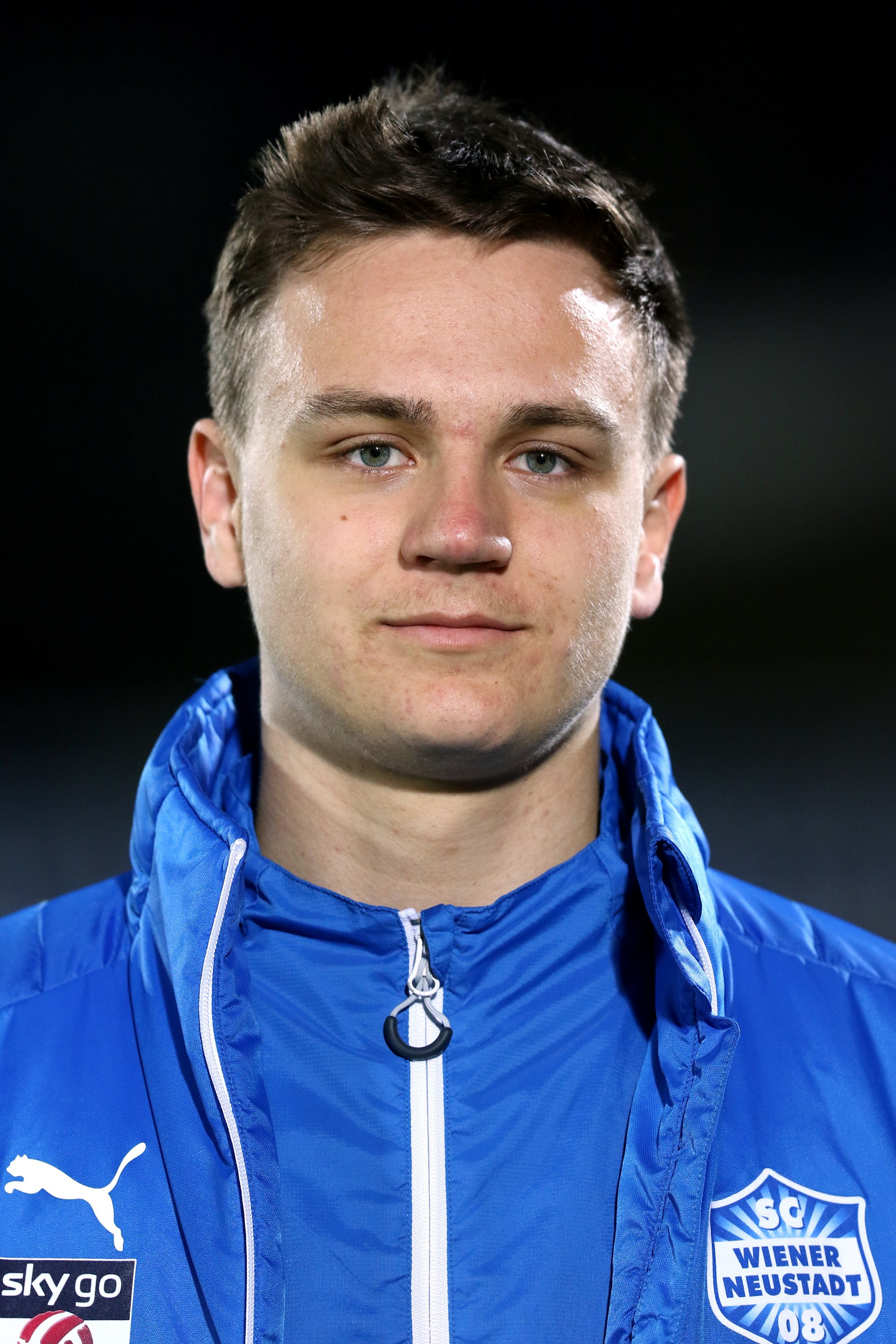
- Fridrikas in 2017

Personal information
- Date of birth: 30 December 1997 (age 28)
- Place of birth: Vienna, Austria
- Height: 1.80 m (5 ft 11 in)
- Position: Striker

Team information
- Current team: TSV Hartberg
- Number: 30

Youth career
- 2006–2012: Admira Wacker
- 2012–2015: Red Bull Salzburg

Senior career*
Years	Team	Apps	(Gls)
2015–2016	USK Anif	18	(3)
2016–2017	SV Seekirchen 1945	17	(15)
2017–2018	Wiener Neustädter	4	(0)
2017	→ SC/ESV Parndorf (loan)	9	(1)
2018–2020	FC Dornbirn	72	(33)
2020–2022	FC Wacker Innsbruck	26	(7)
2022	Austria Klagenfurt	6	(0)
2022–2024	Austria Lustenau	51	(21)
2024–2025	Rheindorf Altach	30	(3)
2025–	TSV Hartberg	26	(4)
- * Club domestic league appearances and goals as of 10 June 2026

Lukas Fridrikas (born 30 December 1997) is an Austrian professional footballer who plays as a striker for Austrian Bundesliga club TSV Hartberg.

== Career ==
Fridrikas is a product of the youth academies of Admira Wacker and Red Bull Salzburg. He began his senior career with USK Anif in 2015, before moving to SV Seekirchen 1945 where he scored 15 goals in 17 games. He then signed with Wiener Neustädter in January 2017.

Fridrikas moved to FC Dornbirn in 2018, and helped them get promoted into the 2. Liga. On 30 December 2020, he transferred to FC Wacker Innsbruck signing a contract until 2024. On 1 January 2022, he transferred to Austria Klagenfurt in the Austrian Football Bundesliga.

In the summer of 2024, Fridrikas signed a three-year contract with Rheindorf Altach.

== Personal life ==
Fridrikas is the son of the Lithuanian former international footballer Robertas and the Lithuanian-Austrian handball player Ausra. His paternal half-brother, Mantas, is also a Lithuanian international footballer.
