= René Swete =

Austrian footballer

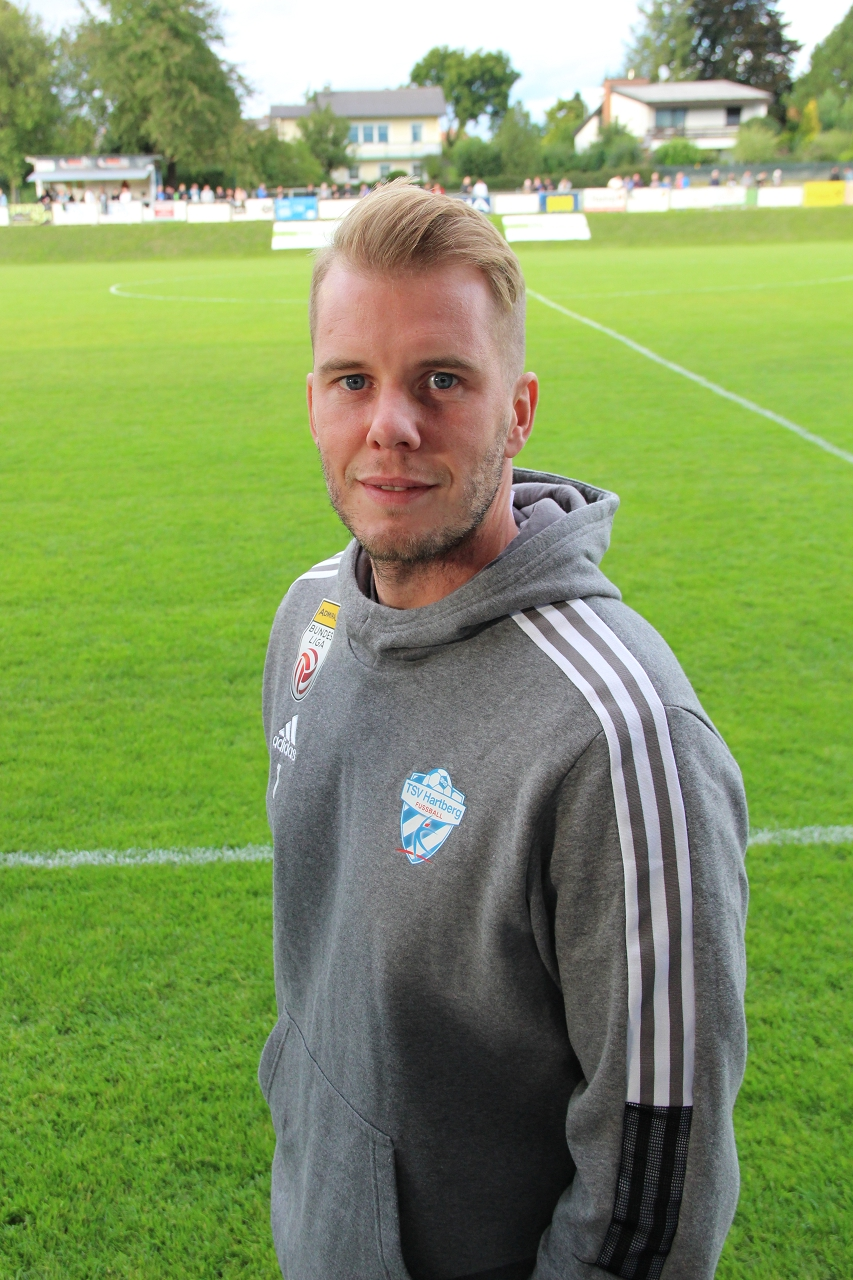
- Swete in 2021

Personal information
- Date of birth: 11 June 1990 (age 36)
- Place of birth: Vienna, Austria
- Height: 1.86 m (6 ft 1 in)
- Position: Goalkeeper

Youth career
- 1996–2001: KSV Ankerbrot Montelaa
- 2001–2002: Favoritner AC
- 2002: FC Wien
- 2002–2004: Favoritner AC
- 2004–2007: Rapid Wien

Senior career*
Years	Team	Apps	(Gls)
2007–2008	Favoritner AC	1	(0)
2008–2011	SVg Guntramsdorf		
2011–2013	1. Simmeringer SC	50	(0)
2013–2015	Floridsdorfer AC	65	(0)
2015–2016	SV Grödig	15	(0)
2016–2023	TSV Hartberg	151	(0)
Total		282	(0)
- * Club domestic league appearances and goals as of 15:23, 14 January 2023 (UTC)

René Swete (born 11 June 1990) is an Austrian former professional footballer who last played as a goalkeeper for Austrian Bundesliga club TSV Hartberg.
