= Stefano Surdanovic =

Austrian footballer (born 1998)

Personal information
- Date of birth: 23 November 1998 (age 27)
- Place of birth: Wels, Austria
- Height: 1.83 m (6 ft 0 in)
- Position: Midfielder

Team information
- Current team: Zrinjski Mostar
- Number: 23

Youth career
- –2011: WSC Hertha Wels
- 2011–2013: FC Wels
- 2013: WSC Hertha Wels
- 2013–2017: SV Ried

Senior career*
Years	Team	Apps	(Gls)
2017–2019	SV Ried	31	(2)
2019–2022	Blau-Weiß Linz	69	(10)
2022	Admira Wacker	14	(2)
2022–2024	Austria Lustenau	51	(4)
2024–	Zrinjski Mostar	32	(1)
- * Club domestic league appearances and goals as of 12 February 2026

Stefano Surdanovic (Serbian Cyrillic: Стефано Сурдановић, romanized: Stefano Surdanović; born 23 November 1998) is an Austrian professional footballer who plays as a midfielder for Bosnian Premier League club Zrinjski Mostar.

== Club career ==
He made his Austrian Football First League debut for SV Ried on 21 July 2017 in a game against SC Wiener Neustadt.

On 3 February 2022, Surdanovic signed with Admira Wacker.

== Personal life ==
Born in Austria, Surdanovic is of Serbian descent and holds a Serbian passport.

== Honours ==
Zrinjski Mostar

- Bosnian Premier League: 2024–25
- Bosnian Supercup: 2024
