= Lustenau =

- Municipality
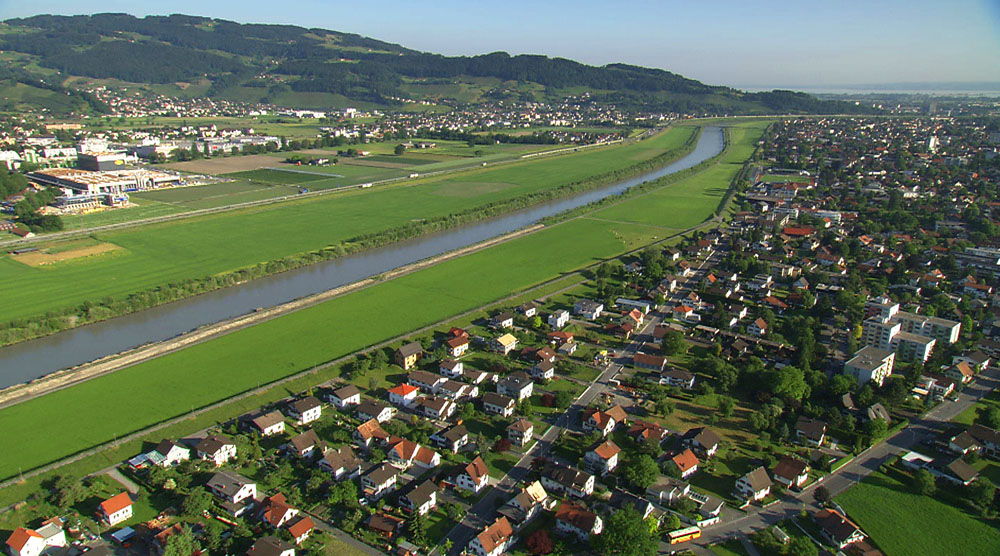

- Coat of arms

- Location of Lustenau within Vorarlberg

- Location within Austria
- Coordinates: 47°25′47″N 09°39′35″E
- Country: Austria
- State: Vorarlberg
- District: Dornbirn

Government
  - Mayor: Mag. Patrick Wiedl (ÖVP)

Area
  - Total: 22.26 km^{2} (8.59 sq mi)
- Elevation: 404 m (1,325 ft)

Population (2015)
  - Total: 22 821
  - Density: 0.99/km^{2} (2.6/sq mi)
- Time zone: UTC+1 (CET)
  - Summer (DST): UTC+2 (CEST)
- Postal code: 6890, 6893
- Area code: 05577
- Vehicle registration: DO
- Website: www.lustenau.at

Lustenau ([ˈluːstənaʊ]; Alemannic German: Luschnou) is a town in the westernmost Austrian state of Vorarlberg in the district of Dornbirn. It lies on the river Rhine, which forms the border with Switzerland. Lustenau is Vorarlberg's fourth largest town.

== Geography ==
Lustenau is located on the eastern bank of the Alpine Rhine, in the lower Vorarlberg Rhine Valley, which serves as the border with the Canton of St. Gallen, Switzerland. Its altitude is 404 meters above sea level. Because the town is located at the bottom of the Rhine Valley, there are no hills or mountains. Lustenau is bordered to the west by the Rhine and to the northeast by the Dornbirner Ach. The territory stretches about 8.5 km from north to south, and about 4 km from east to west.

Four bridges connect Lustenau with Switzerland. The municipality is organised into four parishes, on which locals often refer to: Rotkreuz, Rheindorf, Kirchdorf and Hasenfeld.

As the church square in Lustenau is painted in blue, the village center is called "Blue Square" (German "Blauer Platz").

== History ==
The name Lustenau derives from a document from January 24, 887, signed by the Carolingian king Charles the Fat, with the title "Lustenauua curti regali", meaning "Royal Court of Lustenau". In 1395 AD, the Counts of Werdenberg pledged the Zwingenstein fortress and Lustenau to the Knights of Ems, and in 1526 the pledge was converted into a final purchase. After the male line of the Hohenems family died out in 1759, a decade-long dispute over ownership of Lustenau developed between Maria Theresa of Austria, on the one hand, and the Hohenems heiress Maria Rebekka, on the other. Until 1830, Lustenau was an independent county ruled over by the Counts of Waldburg-Zeil-Lustenau-Hohenems. In 1806, the county lost its Imperial immediacy and was mediatised to Bavaria. After 1830, it became part of Austria. During the German Reich, there is no evidence of any organized resistance against National Socialism in Lustenau. However, a large number of cases of individual opposition are documented, which were punished with arrests, with the delivery to a concentration camp or even with the death penalty. After the Second World War, local embroidery industry gave Lustenau an economic boom.

== Population ==
The first census took place in 1750 and resulted in 1,073 inhabitants. During large periods of its history, the municipality of Lustenau experienced much higher population growth than the average for Vorarlberg. In particular, the strong economic growth that began with the flourishing embroidery industry and the elimination of the flood problem at the end of the 19th century led to a strong migration movement to Lustenau, both from other municipalities in Vorarlberg and from the rest of Austria and southern Germany. A second wave of immigration in the 1950s and 1960s was triggered by the renewed strong economic upswing after the Second World War.

=== Special Characteristics ===
Due to its special political position as the Royal Court, Lustenau was comparatively isolated from its surroundings for centuries. It was not until 1837 that foreign men were accepted as citizens. Because of this, a distinctive dialect has developed and been preserved in Lustenau, which is recognizably different from the other Alemannic dialects of the surrounding area.

Another consequence of Lustenau's centuries of independence is the dominance of a few family names, like "Hämmerle", "Grabherr" and "Bösch". The 1998 inhabitants counted in 1806 were distributed among only 19 family names, which were still born by 60% of the population in 1950. It is due to this circumstance that the use of house names from the 17th century until the late 20th century was even more pronounced in Lustenau than in the rest of Vorarlberg.

The town was formerly a major center of the embroidery industry in the past and is now a centre for the new technologies industry.

Historical population
Year	Pop.	±%
1869	3,903	—
1880	4,164	+6.7%
1890	5,054	+21.4%
1900	5,221	+3.3%
1910	6,221	+19.2%
1923	8,383	+34.8%
1934	8,365	−0.2%
1939	8,733	+4.4%
1951	10,292	+17.9%
1961	12,582	+22.3%
1971	15,451	+22.8%
1981	18,484	+19.6%
1991	19,709	+6.6%
2001	19,709	+0.0%
2011	21,184	+7.5%

Largest groups of foreign residents
Nationality	Population (2026)
Turkey	1,473
Germany	917
Romania	388
Syria	354
Bosnia and Herzegovina	241
Serbia	216
Croatia	195
Hungary	169
Italy	149
Ukraine	101
Russian Federation	101
Bulgaria	83
Afghanistan	73
Poland	49
Slovenia	41
Slovakia	40
Kosovo	36
North Macedonia	31
Czech Republic	21
Iraq	13
Iran	13

== Regular Events ==
Every Summer, for more than 30 years, the culture and youth association "Szene Lustenau" organizes an open-air festival at the Rhine bank, called Szene Openair, the largest festival in Western Austria. The Event hosts international Artist, local bands, and attracts over 10,000 visitors from all over Austria, Germany, Switzerland and Liechtenstein. More than 450 volunteers work for the festival.

The Kilbi, the parish fair of the parish St. Peter and Paul, is the largest fair in Vorarlberg. Every year on the 2nd Sunday in October, around 160 market stalls offer their goods at the church square. A temporary amusement park is set up for the Kilbi on the village square, with roller coasters, carousels, shooting ranges and many more. On the Saturday before the Kilbi, a party is organised called "Kilbifest"

== Transport ==
Lustenau railway station lies on the St. Margrethen–Lauterach line running between St. Margrethen in Switzerland and Bregenz. It is served by the S3 and R5 services of Vorarlberg S-Bahn.

Lustenau is also home to the headquarters of the International Rhine Regulation Railway, a historic industrial railway that was formerly used in the development of dikes and extension of the Rhine out into the Lake of Constance.

== Sport ==
Lustenau has a long and successful history in sports. The town's two football teams, SC Austria Lustenau and FC Lustenau, play in major Austrian football leagues. The well-known and successful skier, Marc Girardelli, was born in Lustenau, and the Lustenau ice hockey team, EHC Lustenau, is part of the Austrian National League. FC Lustenau 07 and SC Austria Lustenau play, at varying levels, in the Austrian Football Bundesliga.

Lustenau is home to two gymnastics and athletic clubs: TS (Turnerschaft) Lustenau and TS Jahn Lustenau, both of which compete at national and international levels. Following the removal of the running track Reichshofstadion in 1998, the stadium was converted into a football-specific venue.

== Notable people ==
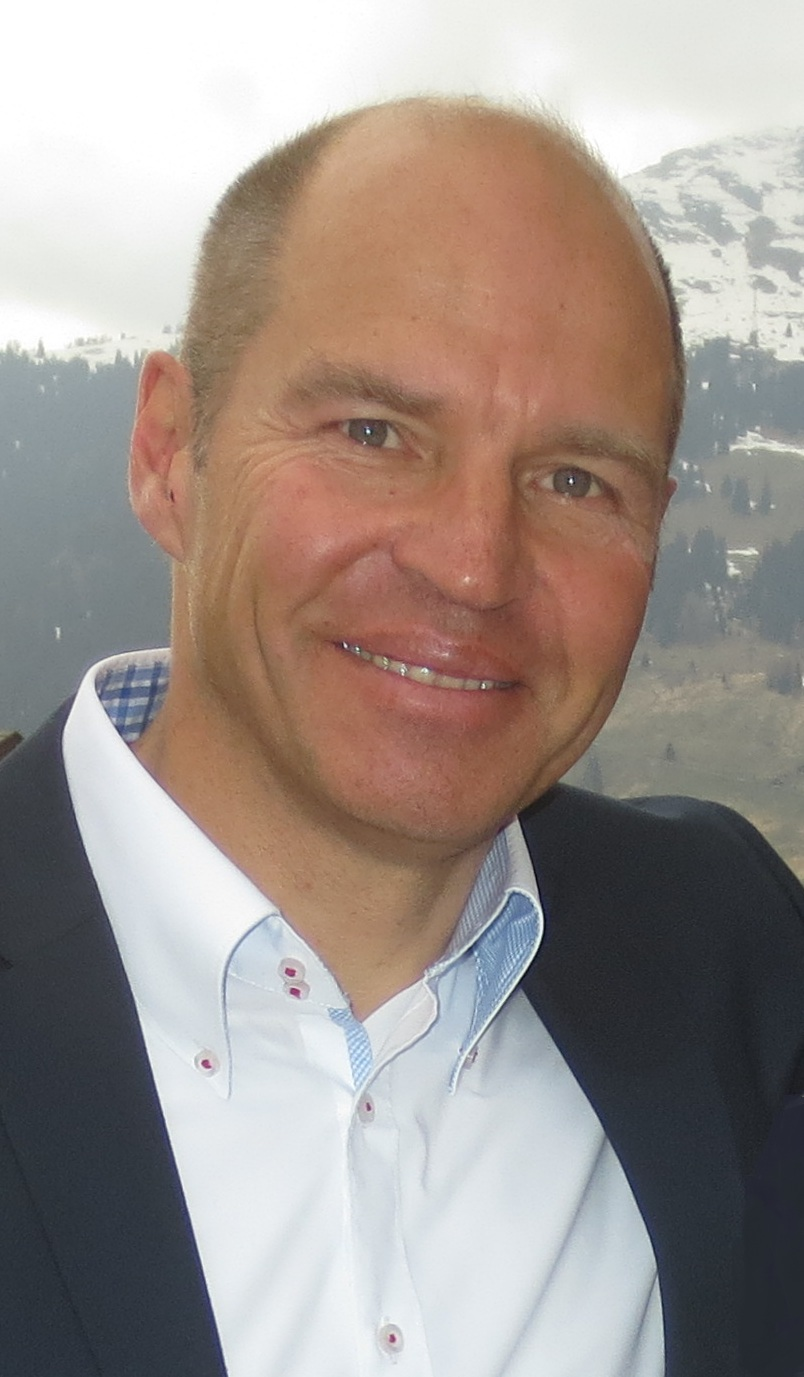
Marc Girardelli, 2014

- Stephanie Hollenstein (1886–1944), an Austrian expressionist landscape and still-life painter.
- Fredmund Malik (born 1944), economist & Austrian honorary consul in Switzerland

=== Sport ===
- Manfred Schurti (born 1941), former touring and prototype racing car driver from Liechtenstein
- Marc Girardelli (born 1963), skier, two time silver medallist at the 1992 Winter Olympics
- Markus Peintner (born 1980), ice hockey player
- René Swette (born 1988), ice hockey player
- Barbara Gasser (born 1989), gymnast, brought up locally
- Pius Grabher (born 1993), an Austrian footballer who has played over 260 games
