= 2021–22 Austrian Football Second League =

48th season of the Austrian second-level football league

Austrian Football Second League
- Season: 2021–22
- Dates: 23 July 2021 – 22 May 2022
- Champions: SC Austria Lustenau
- Promoted: SC Austria Lustenau
- Relegated: Wacker Innsbruck; FC Juniors OÖ
- Top goalscorer: (Switzerland) Haris Tabaković (27 goals)
- Biggest home win: 6-0 (m15 Oct 2021) (Lustenau v. Kapfenberger SV)
- Biggest away win: 0-6 (m31 July 2021) (Dornbirn v. SKU Amstetten)
- Highest scoring: 6-2 (m12 Sept 2021) (Liefering v. Rapid II)

The 2021–22 Austrian Football Second League known as the Admiral 2nd League for sponsorship purposes, was the 48th season of the Austrian second-level football league and the fourth as the Second League. The league consisted of 16 teams.

== Teams ==
Sixteen teams participated in the 2021–22 season. The only added team was St. Pölten, relegated from the 2020–21 Austrian Football Bundesliga.

Due to the suspension of the 2020–21 Austrian Regionalliga, no club was relegated from the previous season

SC Austria Lustenau captured the title and will return to the Austrian Football Bundesliga for the first time since the 1999-2000 season.

Location of teams in the 2021–22 Austrian Football Second League

Club Name	City	Stadium	Capacity
Austria Lustenau	Lustenau	Reichshofstadion	8,800
Blau-Weiß Linz	Linz	Donauparkstadion	2,000
Floridsdorfer AC	Vienna	FAC-Platz	3,000
Austria Wien II	Vienna	Generali-Arena	17,500
Kapfenberger SV	Kapfenberg	Franz Fekete Stadium	10,000
Liefering	Salzburg	Untersberg-Arena	4,128
Rapid Wien II	Vienna	Allianz Stadion	28,000
St. Pölten	Sankt Pölten	NV Arena	8,000
Wacker Innsbruck	Innsbruck	Tivoli Stadion Tirol	16,000
Grazer AK	Graz	Merkur-Arena	15,323
FC Dornbirn	Dornbirn	Stadion Birkenwiese	7,500
FC Juniors OÖ	Pasching	Waldstadion	7,870
SV Horn	Horn	Sparkasse Horn Arena	7,870
SKU Amstetten	Amstetten	Ertl Glas Stadion	2,000
SV Lafnitz	Lafnitz	Sportplatz Lafnitz	3,000
Vorwärts Steyr	Steyr	Vorwärts-Stadion	6,000

== League table ==
Pos	Team	Pld	W	D	L	GF	GA	GD	Pts	Promotion or relegation
1	Austria Lustenau (C, P)	30	22	4	4	69	26	+43	70	Promotion to 2022–23 Austrian Bundesliga
2	Floridsdorfer AC	30	20	5	5	51	18	+33	65	
3	Blau-Weiß Linz	30	15	9	6	51	27	+24	54	
4	SV Lafnitz	30	15	7	8	53	42	+11	52	
5	SKU Amstetten	30	15	6	9	59	35	+24	51	
6	FC Liefering	30	12	10	8	56	43	+13	46	
7	Grazer AK	30	13	7	10	47	39	+8	46	
8	SKN St. Pölten	30	12	6	12	43	38	+5	42	
9	Vorwärts Steyr	30	10	7	13	39	52	−13	37	
10	Rapid Wien II	30	8	9	13	45	62	−17	33	
11	Kapfenberger SV	30	8	6	16	36	54	−18	30	
12	SV Horn	30	7	7	16	34	55	−21	28	
13	Austria Wien II	30	6	7	17	31	56	−25	25	
14	FC Dornbirn (Note: No club applied for a license for admission to the second division from the Regionalliga West, meaning there are only two promotion/relegation places available.)	30	6	4	20	35	73	−38	22	
15	FC Juniors OÖ (Note: FC Juniors OÖ has waived admission for the 2022/23 season and will therefore be relegated from the Admiral 2nd division.) (R)	30	4	11	15	37	71	−34	23	Relegation to 2022–23 Austrian Football Regionalliga
16	Wacker Innsbruck (Note: Wacker Innsbruck did not apply for a license for the next season, and as a result decided not to file a complaint with the Permanent Neutral Arbitration Court. This places the club at the bottom of the table and is relegated from the Admiral 2nd League.) (R)	30	11	7	12	46	41	+5	40	Relegation to 2022–23 Austrian Football Regionalliga

Source: 2.Liga Table
Rules for classification: 1) Points; 2) Head-to-head 3) Goal difference; 4) Goals scored; 5) Matches won; 6) Away matches won; 7) Away goals scored
(C) Champions; (P) Promoted; (R) Relegated

=== Results ===
Home \ Away	AMS	AUL	AUW	BWL	DOR	FAC	GAK	HOR	JUN	KAP	LAF	LIE	RAP	STP	VOR	WAC
SKU Amstetten	—	0–2	2–0	1–0	4–0	1–1	3–0	0–0	0–1	3–0	1–1	2–2	5–2	2–1	3–0	1–0
Austria Lustenau	3–1	—	4–0	0–1	4–0	1–2	2–1	2–0	5–0	6–0	2–1	2–1	1–1	3–0	3–1	2–1
Austria Wien II	0–5	1–4	—	1–4	1–2	0–2	0–0	1–3	4–0	1–3	0–1	0–2	3–3	0–0	2–0	1–1
Blau-Weiß Linz	5–2	1–1	3–1	—	2–1	0–2	1–0	3–1	2–0	2–2	3–0	3–0	1–0	1–1	1–1	3–0
FC Dornbirn	0–6	0–2	1–1	2–2	—	0–2	1–2	2–1	2–2	4–1	1–4	1–4	2–1	3–4	3–3	1–0
Floridsdorfer AC	3–0	3–1	1–2	2–0	1–0	—	2–1	3–0	3–1	3–0	2–2	2–1	0–0	2–0	2–0	1–3
Grazer AK	0–3	0–0	1–3	1–0	2–0	1–0	—	1–1	5–1	0–0	4–1	0–3	2–2	1–0	4–0	3–1
SV Horn	0–3	1–2	0–1	2–1	3–1	0–3	0–2	—	1–1	0–1	2–1	2–3	1–1	0–1	2–1	0–2
FC Juniors OÖ	0–5	0–1	2–2	2–2	5–2	0–1	0–4	2–2	—	1–1	2–4	4–3	1–3	1–3	3–1	3–3
Kapfenberger SV	0–2	1–2	5–1	0–0	2–0	1–2	1–2	0–0	1–1	—	1–0	0–2	1–2	2–0	1–3	3–2
SV Lafnitz	2–0	1–4	1–0	3–1	2–0	1–0	1–4	5–1	2–2	3–2	—	1–3	4–2	1–0	1–0	2–2
FC Liefering	1–1	2–5	0–0	0–0	4–2	0–0	1–1	4–1	2–0	3–2	1–1	—	6–2	2–1	1–1	0–1
Rapid Wien II	5–2	1–2	2–1	0–3	1–1	0–4	2–1	3–2	0–0	0–3	0–3	2–2	—	0–1	2–2	0–3
SKN St. Pölten	4–0	1–1	2–0	1–1	0–3	0–1	6–1	1–3	2–1	4–1	1–1	2–0	1–2	—	1–1	3–1
Vorwärts Steyr	1–1	1–2	1–0	0–4	4–1	1–0	3–2	2–2	0–0	3–1	1–3	2–1	2–5	2–0	—	0–1
Wacker Innsbruck	1–0	3–0	1–4	0–1	3–0	1–1	1–1	2–3	5–1	2–0	0–0	2–2	2–1	1–2	1–2	—

Updated to match(es) played on 22 May 2022. Source: soccerway.com
Legend: Blue = home team win; Yellow = draw; Red = away team win.

== Season statistics ==
=== Top goalscorers ===
Rank	Player	Club	Goals
1	(Switzerland) Haris Tabaković	SC Austria Lustenau	27
2	(Brazil) Ronivaldo	FC Wacker Innsbruck	21
3	(Croatia) Roko Šimić	FC Liefering	19
4	(Austria) Muhammed Cham	SC Austria Lustenau	15
5	(Austria) Stefan Feiertag	SKU Amstetten	13
6	(Austria) Anthony Schmid	Floridsdorfer AC	11
6	(Austria) David Peham	Grazer AK	11

== See also ==
- 2021–22 Austrian Football Bundesliga
- 2021–22 Austrian Cup
