= List of Austrian football transfers summer 2021 =

This is a list of Austrian football transfers for the 2021 summer transfer window. Only transfers featuring Austrian Football Bundesliga are listed.

== Austrian Football Bundesliga ==
Note: Flags indicate national team as has been defined under FIFA eligibility rules. Players may hold more than one non-FIFA nationality.

=== Red Bull Salzburg ===
In:

No.	Pos.	Nation	Player
4	DF	POL	Kamil Piątkowski (from (Poland) Raków Częstochowa)
7	MF	ARG	Nicolás Capaldo (from (Argentina) Boca Juniors)
95	DF	BRA	Bernardo (from (England) Brighton & Hove Albion, previously on loan)
—	FW	CRO	Roko Šimić (from (Croatia) Lokomotiva)

Out:

No.	Pos.	Nation	Player
1	GK	AUT	Cican Stankovic (to (Greece) AEK Athens)
8	FW	GER	Mërgim Berisha (to (Turkey) Fenerbahçe)
15	DF	BRA	André Ramalho (to (Netherlands) PSV)
20	FW	ZAM	Patson Daka (to (England) Leicester City)
25	DF	AUT	Patrick Farkas (to (Switzerland) Luzern)
42	DF	AUT	David Affengruber (to Sturm Graz)
45	MF	ZAM	Enock Mwepu (to (England) Brighton & Hove Albion)
70	DF	BIH	Amar Dedić (on loan to WAC)
—	MF	MLI	Ousmane Diakité (on loan to (Switzerland) St. Gallen)
—	FW	CRO	Roko Šimić (on loan to Liefering)
—	DF	SUI	Jasper van der Werff (on loan to (Germany) SC Paderborn 07, previously on loan at (Switzerland) Basel)
—	DF	GHA	Gideon Mensah (on loan to (France) Bordeaux, previously on loan at (Portugal) Vitória de Guimarães)
—	DF	BIH	Darko Todorović (on loan to (Russia) Akhmat Grozny, previously on loan at (Croatia) Hajduk Split)
—	MF	MLI	Mamadou Sangare (on loan to GAK, previously on loan at Liefering)
—	FW	BRA	Luis Phelipe (on loan to (Switzerland) Lugano, previously on loan at (Brazil) Red Bull Bragantino)
—	MF	SVK	Peter Pokorný (to (Spain) Real Sociedad, previously on loan at St. Pölten)
—	MF	GHA	Majeed Ashimeru (to (Belgium) Anderlecht, previously on loan)
—	MF	JPN	Masaya Okugawa (to (Germany) Arminia Bielefeld, previously on loan)
—	FW	GHA	Samuel Tetteh (to (Turkey) Adanaspor, previously on loan at St. Pölten)

=== Rapid Wien ===
In:

No.	Pos.	Nation	Player
4	DF	AUT	Emanuel Aiwu (from Admira Wacker)
5	MF	AUT	Robert Ljubičić (from St. Pölten)
6	DF	AUT	Kevin Wimmer (from (England) Stoke City, previously on loan at (Germany) Karlsruher SC)
10	MF	AUT	Thierno Ballo (on loan from (England) Chelsea)
23	MF	AUT	Jonas Auer (from (Czech Republic) Mladá Boleslav, previously on loan at (Czech Republic) Viktoria Žižkov)
27	FW	AUT	Marco Grüll (from Ried)

Out:

No.	Pos.	Nation	Player
4	DF	CRO	Mateo Barać (to (Russia) Sochi)
6	DF	AUT	Mario Sonnleitner (to Hartberg)
8	MF	AUT	Marcel Ritzmaier (loan return to (England) Barnsley)
19	FW	AUT	Deni Alar (to St. Pölten)
39	MF	AUT	Dejan Ljubicic (to (Germany) 1. FC Köln)
46	DF	AUT	Paul Gobara (on loan to SV Horn)
48	FW	AUT	Yusuf Demir (on loan to (Spain) Barcelona B)

=== Sturm Graz ===
In:

No.	Pos.	Nation	Player
6	DF	AUT	Aleksandar Borković (on loan from (Germany) Hoffenheim II)
8	MF	AUT	Alexander Prass (from Liefering)
11	FW	AUT	Manprit Sarkaria (from Austria Wien)
15	FW	CIV	Anderson Niangbo (on loan from (Belgium) Gent)
42	DF	AUT	David Affengruber (from Red Bull Salzburg)

Out:

No.	Pos.	Nation	Player
6	DF	AUT	David Nemeth (loan return to (Germany) Mainz 05 II)
9	FW	ALB	Bekim Balaj (to (Russia) Nizhny Novgorod)
15	MF	AUT	Sebastian Zettl (on loan to FAC)
20	FW	AUT	Kevin Friesenbichler (to (Latvia) RFS)
28	FW	AUT	Winfred Amoah (to Kapfenberg)
33	MF	KOS	Dardan Shabanhaxhaj (on loan to Kapfenberg)
40	FW	AUT	Oliver Bacher (to First Vienna)
—	MF	AUT	Michael John Lema (to Hartberg, previously on loan)
—	MF	AUT	Tobias Koch (to Blau-Weiß Linz, previously on loan at Lafnitz)

=== LASK ===
In:

No.	Pos.	Nation	Player
4	DF	FRA	Yannis Letard (from (Switzerland) St. Gallen)
13	DF	CYP	Strahinja Kerkez (from (Cyprus) AEL Limassol)
21	MF	KOR	Hong Hyun-seok (from Juniors OÖ)
22	FW	AUT	Christoph Monschein (from Austria Wien)
29	MF	AUT	Florian Flecker (from Hartberg)
30	MF	AUT	Sascha Horvath (from Hartberg)
32	DF	SUI	Enrique Wild (from Juniors OÖ)
33	DF	AUT	Felix Luckeneder (from Hartberg)
35	MF	AUT	Stefan Radulović (from Austria Wien)
38	FW	JPN	Keito Nakamura (from (Japan) Gamba Osaka, previously on loan at Juniors OÖ)
44	DF	AUT	Dario Marešić (on loan from (France) Stade Reims)

Out:

No.	Pos.	Nation	Player
11	FW	AUT	Dominik Reiter (to SCR Altach)
13	FW	GER	Johannes Eggestein (loan return to (Germany) Werder Bremen)
15	DF	AUT	Christian Ramsebner (to St. Pölten)
18	DF	AUT	Gernot Trauner (to (Netherlands) Feyenoord)
19	MF	AUT	Valentino Müller (to WSG Tirol)
20	MF	AUT	Patrick Plojer (on loan to Blau-Weiß Linz)
21	MF	DEN	Mads Emil Madsen (to (Czech Republic) Slavia Prague)
26	DF	AUT	Reinhold Ranftl (to (Germany) Schalke 04)
30	DF	PAN	Andrés Andrade (on loan to (Germany) Arminia Bielefeld)
33	FW	AUT	Thomas Sabitzer (on loan to WSG Tirol)
40	GK	AUT	Thomas Turner (to Vorwärts Steyr)
—	MF	ISR	Yoav Hofmayster (on loan to (Israel) Hapoel Tel Aviv, previously on loan at (Israel) Ironi Kiryat Shmona)
—	FW	PER	Matías Succar (on loan to (Czech Republic) Teplice, previously on loan at Juniors OÖ)
—	DF	AUT	David Schnegg (to (Italy) Venezia, previously on loan at WSG Tirol)
—	MF	GER	Daniel Jelišić (free agent, previously on loan at Juniors OÖ)

=== Wolfsberg ===
In:

No.	Pos.	Nation	Player
4	DF	AUT	David Gugganig (from WSG Tirol)
11	FW	ISR	Tai Baribo (from (Israel) Maccabi Petah Tikva)
20	MF	GHA	Augustine Boakye (from (Ghana) WAFA)
77	DF	BIH	Amar Dedić (on loan from Red Bull Salzburg)

Out:

No.	Pos.	Nation	Player
2	DF	GEO	Guram Giorbelidze (on loan to (Germany) Dynamo Dresden)
5	DF	AUT	Stefan Perić (to (Croatia) Šibenik)
6	DF	AUT	Mario Pavelić (to (Lithuania) Žalgiris)
9	FW	SRB	Dejan Joveljić (loan return to (Germany) Eintracht Frankfurt)
13	DF	BIH	Tarik Muharemović (to (Italy) Juventus B)
15	DF	SRB	Nemanja Rnić (retired)
32	GK	AUT	Marko Soldo (free agent)
—	MF	AUT	Bajram Syla (to Allerheiligen, previously on loan at Lafnitz)

=== WSG Tirol ===
In:

No.	Pos.	Nation	Player
1	GK	AUT	Paul Schermer (from AKA Tirol U18)
3	DF	RUS	Leon Klassen (from (Germany) 1860 Munich)
4	MF	AUT	Valentino Müller (from LASK)
5	DF	AUT	Felix Bacher (from (Germany) Freiburg II)
7	FW	AUT	Thomas Sabitzer (on loan from LASK)
9	FW	ALB	Giacomo Vrioni (on loan from (Italy) Juventus)
10	MF	DEN	Bror Blume (from (Denmark) AGF)
14	MF	AUT	Alexander Ranacher (from Austria Lustenau)
15	DF	GER	Maxime Awoudja (on loan from (Germany) VfB Stuttgart, previously on loan at (Germany) Türkgücü München)
19	FW	AUT	Justin Forst (from AKA Tirol U18)
22	DF	AUT	Mario Andric (from Kufstein)
26	DF	CRO	Dominik Štumberger (from Austria Lustenau)
37	MF	AUT	Markus Wallner (from Wacker Innsbruck)

Out:

No.	Pos.	Nation	Player
4	DF	AUT	David Gugganig (to WAC)
5	MF	ARG	Ignacio Jaúregui (to (Spain) Linense)
7	MF	AUT	Benjamin Pranter (to Schwaz)
9	FW	DEN	Nikolai Baden Frederiksen (loan return to (Italy) Juventus B)
10	MF	AUT	Florian Toplitsch (to Völs)
14	DF	AUT	Julian Gölles (to Blau-Weiß Linz)
16	MF	AUT	Florian Rieder (to Austria Klagenfurt)
18	MF	AUT	Kilian Bauernfeind (on loan to Dornbirn)
22	FW	SVN	Zlatko Dedić (free agent)
26	DF	AUT	Florian Buchacher (free agent)
28	DF	AUT	David Schnegg (loan return to LASK)
29	FW	AUT	Stefan Lauf (on loan to Dornbirn)
34	DF	AUT	Stefan Hager (to Wacker Innsbruck)
43	MF	AUT	Nemanja Celic (to (Germany) SV Darmstadt 98)
44	DF	BRA	Bruno Soares (to (Germany) 1. FC Saarbrücken)

=== Hartberg ===
In:

No.	Pos.	Nation	Player
4	MF	AUT	Florian Weiler (on loan from Sturm Graz II)
6	MF	AUT	Philipp Erhardt (from (Germany) Türkgücü München)
7	MF	AUT	Michael John Lema (from Sturm Graz, previously on loan)
9	FW	SRB	Nemanja Belaković (from (Latvia) Spartaks Jūrmala)
10	MF	GER	Noel Niemann (on loan from (Germany) Arminia Bielefeld, previously on loan at (Germany) Türkgücü München)
12	DF	AUT	Michael Steinwender (from St. Pölten)
16	DF	AUT	Mario Sonnleitner (from Rapid Wien)
19	FW	AUT	Jürgen Lemmerer (from AKA Burgenland U18)
22	DF	AUT	David Stec (from (Poland) Pogoń Szczecin)
26	FW	BEL	Gabriel Lemoine (from (France) Bordeaux II, previously on loan at (Belgium) Lommel)
27	DF	AUT	Thomas Kofler (from Wacker Innsbruck)
30	MF	GHA	Seth Paintsil (from Ried)
77	FW	KOS	Donis Avdijaj (from (Cyprus) AEL Limassol)

Out:

No.	Pos.	Nation	Player
4	DF	AUT	Michael Huber (to GAK)
6	DF	AUT	Andreas Lienhart (retired)
7	MF	AUT	Julius Ertlthaler (free agent)
8	MF	NGA	Samson Tijani (loan return to Red Bull Salzburg)
9	MF	SVN	Rajko Rep (to (Romania) Sepsi OSK)
10	MF	AUT	Stefan Rakowitz (free agent)
22	MF	AUT	Florian Flecker (to LASK)
27	MF	AUT	Lukas Ried (free agent)
29	MF	AUT	Sascha Horvath (to LASK)
32	DF	AUT	Felix Luckeneder (to LASK)
39	DF	AUT	Stefan Gölles (on loan to Lafnitz)
42	MF	MLI	Bakary Nimaga (to (Hungary) Zalaegerszegi)
45	FW	AUT	Seifedin Chabbi (to Ried)

=== Austria Wien ===
In:

No.	Pos.	Nation	Player
3	DF	MKD	Filip Antovski (from (Croatia) Dinamo Zagreb II)
7	FW	AUS	Tristan Hammond (from (Portugal) Sporting B)
13	GK	AUT	Lukas Wedl (from Wacker Innsbruck)
18	FW	NED	Noah Ohio (on loan from (Germany) RB Leipzig, previously on loan at (Netherlands) Vitesse)
20	DF	GER	Lukas Mühl (from (Germany) 1. FC Nürnberg)
30	MF	AUT	Manfred Fischer (from SCR Altach)
66	DF	LUX	Marvin Martins (from (Portugal) Casa Pia)

Out:

No.	Pos.	Nation	Player
2	DF	AUT	Christoph Schösswendter (free agent)
4	DF	USA	Erik Palmer-Brown (loan return to (England) Manchester City)
8	DF	AUT	Stephan Zwierschitz (to Admira Wacker)
9	MF	AUT	Patrick Wimmer (to (Germany) Arminia Bielefeld)
11	FW	AUT	Benedikt Pichler (to (Germany) Holstein Kiel)
14	FW	AUT	Christoph Monschein (to LASK)
15	DF	AUT	Michael Madl (retired)
16	MF	AUT	Stefan Radulović (to LASK)
20	DF	DEN	Andreas Poulsen (loan return to (Germany) Borussia Mönchengladbach)
23	MF	ALB	Agim Zeka (to (Kosovo) Drita)
27	MF	AUT	Thomas Ebner (free agent)
70	FW	AUT	Manprit Sarkaria (to Sturm Graz)

=== Ried ===
In:

No.	Pos.	Nation	Player
8	FW	BRA	Valdir (from (Brazil) Maruinense)
9	FW	AUT	Seifedin Chabbi (from Hartberg)
13	DF	AUT	Julian Turi (from Admira Wacker II)
17	MF	AUT	Philipp Pomer (from Blau-Weiß Linz)
21	FW	CRO	Leo Mikić (from Kapfenberg)
24	DF	CRO	Tin Plavotic (from FAC)
26	MF	AUT	Nicolas Zdichynec (from Admira Wacker II)
30	DF	SRB	Miloš Jovičić (from Lafnitz)
32	GK	AUT	Christoph Haas (from Admira Wacker)
33	GK	AUT	Jonas Wendlinger (from (Germany) Nürnberg II)
77	FW	BRA	Reinaldo (from (Brazil) Maruinense)
—	MF	AUT	David Ungar (from Leobendorf)

Out:

No.	Pos.	Nation	Player
8	FW	AUT	Patrick Schmidt (loan return to (England) Barnsley)
9	FW	AUT	Bernd Gschweidl (to St. Pölten)
14	DF	GHA	Kennedy Boateng (to (Portugal) Santa Clara)
17	FW	AUT	Marco Grüll (to Rapid Wien)
18	FW	AUT	Filip Borsos (to Blau-Weiß Linz)
19	FW	GHA	Sadam Sulley (free agent)
23	DF	AUT	Manuel Haas (to (Germany) VfL Osnabrück)
25	MF	AUT	Patrick Möschl (free agent)
28	DF	AUT	Thomas Reifeltshammer (retired)
30	MF	GHA	Seth Paintsil (to Hartberg)
31	MF	AUT	Balakiyem Takougnadi (free agent)
32	GK	AUT	Lukas Gütlbauer (on loan to FAC)
34	GK	AUT	Daniel-Edward Daniliuc (free agent)
—	MF	AUT	David Ungar (on loan to FAC)
—	DF	AUT	Bojan Lugonja (free agent, previously on loan at FAC)

=== SCR Altach ===
In:

No.	Pos.	Nation	Player
3	DF	AUT	Lukas Prokop (from Austria Wien II)
4	DF	AUT	Felix Strauss (from Blau-Weiß Linz)
6	DF	FRA	Pape-Alioune Ndiaye (from (Ukraine) Vorskla Poltava)
8	MF	AUT	Lukas Parger (from Kapfenberg)
9	FW	KOS	Atdhe Nuhiu (from (Cyprus) APOEL)
10	FW	AUT	Dominik Reiter (from LASK)
19	DF	AUT	Sebastian Aigner (from Liefering)
22	FW	AUT	Amir Abdijanovic (from (Germany) Wolfsburg II)
28	MF	AUT	Boris Prokopič (from (Liechtenstein) Vaduz)
30	FW	CRO	Sandi Križman (from (Greece) PAS Giannina)
33	MF	HUN	Csaba Bukta (from Liefering, previously on loan)
—	MF	AUT	Ronny Rikal (from Admira Wacker)

Out:

No.	Pos.	Nation	Player
3	DF	AUT	Leonardo Zottele (free agent)
4	MF	CMR	Samuel Gouet (to (Belgium) Mechelen)
6	DF	SRB	Neven Subotić (free agent)
9	FW	AUT	Daniel Maderner (to (Belgium) Waasland-Beveren)
15	MF	SUI	Alain Wiss (free agent)
19	DF	AUT	Emir Karic (to (Germany) SV Darmstadt 98)
22	FW	AUT	Ogulcan Bekar (retired)
23	MF	SVN	Aljaž Casar (to (Germany) Hoffenheim II)
25	FW	NGA	Chinedu Obasi (free agent)
26	FW	AUT	Daniel Nussbaumer (to (Portugal) Académico de Viseu)
28	DF	BRA	Anderson (on loan to Dornbirn)
30	MF	AUT	Manfred Fischer (to Austria Wien)
31	FW	ARG	Danilo Carando (to (Peru) Cienciano)
—	MF	AUT	Ronny Rikal (on loan to Dornbirn)
—	DF	AUT	Leo Mätzler (on loan to Austria Lustenau, previously on loan at (Switzerland) Wil)
—	DF	AUT	Julian Klar (to SV Horn, previously on loan])

=== Admira Wacker ===
In:

No.	Pos.	Nation	Player
3	DF	AUT	Philipp Schmiedl (on loan from (Denmark) SønderjyskE)
9	FW	AUT	Marlon Mustapha (on loan from (Germany) 1. FSV Mainz 05)
10	MF	ISR	Ilay Elmkies (on loan from (Germany) TSG 1899 Hoffenheim, previously on loan at (Netherlands) ADO Den Haag)
15	DF	AUT	Stephan Zwierschitz (from Austria Wien)
23	DF	GER	Yannick Brugger (from (Germany) Eintracht Frankfurt)
25	MF	AUT	Thomas Ebner (free agent)
30	GK	AUT	Belmin Jenciragic (from FAC)
98	FW	BRA	Patrick (from Horn)

Out:

No.	Pos.	Nation	Player
10	FW	GER	Maximilian Breunig (loan return to (Germany) Würzburger Kickers)
15	DF	AUT	Lukas Rath (free agent)
16	FW	AUT	Erwin Hoffer (free agent)
21	MF	AUT	Christian Gartner (to (Germany) Alemannia Aachen)
22	MF	AUT	Marcus Maier (free agent)
23	DF	AUT	Pascal Petlach (to Traiskirchen)
25	DF	SRB	Miloš Spasić (free agent)
27	DF	AUT	Emanuel Aiwu (to Rapid Wien)
30	GK	AUT	Christoph Haas (to Ried)
43	FW	AUT	Maximilian Sax (loan return to Austria Wien)
77	MF	GHA	David Atanga (loan return to (Germany) Holstein Kiel)
90	MF	BIH	Tomislav Tomić (to (Slovenia) Olimpija Ljubljana)
99	FW	USA	Andrew Wooten (to (Germany) VfL Osnabrück)
—	FW	SRB	Aleksandar Ćirković (to (Spain) Gimnàstic, previously on loan at (Serbia) Mačva)

=== Austria Klagenfurt ===
In:

No.	Pos.	Nation	Player
3	MF	USA	Thomas Roberts (on loan from (United States) Dallas)
5	DF	AUT	Michael Blauensteiner (from St. Pölten)
19	FW	GER	Luca Grillemeier (from (Germany) Borussia Mönchengladbach youth)
21	GK	AUT	Marcel Köstenbauer (from Admira Wacker II)
23	MF	AUT	Florian Rieder (from WSG Tirol)
30	GK	AUT	David Puntigam (from Kalsdorf)
37	DF	AUT	Nicolas Wimmer (from Blau-Weiß Linz)
47	DF	AUT	Hubert Griesebner (from Salzburg youth)
77	FW	CAN	Gloire Amanda (from (United States) Oregon State Beavers)
81	MF	TUR	Turgay Gemicibasi (from Blau-Weiß Linz)
—	DF	GER	Till Schumacher (from (Czech Republic) Bohemians)

Out:

No.	Pos.	Nation	Player
12	MF	SWE	Alex Timossi Andersson (loan return to (Germany) Bayern Munich II)
16	FW	AUT	Oliver Markoutz (retired)
18	MF	AUT	Markus Rusek (to GAK)
19	DF	ITA	Simon Straudi (loan return to (Germany) Werder Bremen)
77	GK	SVN	Kristijan Kondić (free agent)

== See also ==
- 2021–22 Austrian Football Bundesliga
