= 2021–22 TSV Hartberg season =

TSV Hartberg
2021–22 season
- Chairman: Brigitte Annerl
- Manager: Kurt Russ
- Stadium: Profertil Arena Hartberg
- Austrian Football Bundesliga: 10th
- Austrian Cup: Semi-finals
- Top goalscorer: League: Dario Tadić (10); All: Dario Tadić (14)
Home colours	Away colours

The 2021–22 season was the 76th season in the existence of TSV Hartberg and the club's fourth consecutive season in the top flight of Austrian football. In addition to the domestic league, TSV Hartberg participated in this season's edition of the Austrian Cup.

== Players ==
=== First-team squad ===
As of 30 January 2022

Note: Flags indicate national team as defined under FIFA eligibility rules; some limited exceptions apply. Players may hold more than one non-FIFA nationality.

No.	Pos.	Nation	Player
1	GK	AUT	René Swete
4	MF	AUT	Florian Weiler (on loan from Sturm Graz)
5	DF	AUT	Manfred Gollner
6	MF	AUT	Philipp Erhardt
7	MF	AUT	Michael John Lema
8	DF	AUT	Marcel Schantl
9	MF	TUR	Okan Aydın
10	MF	GER	Noel Niemann (on loan from Arminia Bielefeld)
11	MF	CRO	Matija Horvat
12	DF	AUT	Michael Steinwender
14	DF	AUT	Christian Klem
16	DF	AUT	Mario Sonnleitner
18	FW	AUT	Philipp Sturm
20	FW	AUT	Marc Andre Schmerböck

No.	Pos.	Nation	Player
21	GK	AUT	Florian Faist
22	MF	AUT	Mario Kröpfl
23	MF	AUT	Tobias Kainz
24	FW	AUT	Dario Tadić
26	FW	BEL	Gabriel Lemoine
27	DF	AUT	Thomas Kofler
28	MF	AUT	Jürgen Heil
29	DF	AUT	Patrick Farkas
30	MF	GHA	Seth Paintsil
31	DF	AUT	Thomas Rotter
32	MF	MLI	Youba Diarra (on loan from RB Salzburg)
35	GK	AUT	Raphael Sallinger
44	GK	AUT	Maximilian Pusswald
77	FW	KOS	Donis Avdijaj

=== Out on loan ===
Note: Flags indicate national team as defined under FIFA eligibility rules; some limited exceptions apply. Players may hold more than one non-FIFA nationality.

No. / Pos. / Nation / Player; — / DF / AUT / Stefan Gölles (at SV Lafnitz until 30 June 2022)	No. / Pos. / Nation / Player; — / MF / AUT / Lukas Fadinger (at SV Lafnitz until 30 June 2022)

== Transfers ==
In:

No.	Pos.	Nation	Player
4	MF	AUT	Florian Weiler (on loan from Sturm Graz II)
6	MF	AUT	Philipp Erhardt (from (Germany) Türkgücü München)
7	MF	AUT	Michael John Lema (from Sturm Graz, previously on loan)
9	FW	SRB	Nemanja Belaković (from (Latvia) Spartaks Jūrmala)
10	MF	GER	Noel Niemann (on loan from (Germany) Arminia Bielefeld, previously on loan at (Germany) Türkgücü München)
12	DF	AUT	Michael Steinwender (from St. Pölten)
16	DF	AUT	Mario Sonnleitner (from Rapid Wien)
19	FW	AUT	Jürgen Lemmerer (from AKA Burgenland U18)
22	DF	AUT	David Stec (from (Poland) Pogoń Szczecin)
26	FW	BEL	Gabriel Lemoine (from (France) Bordeaux II, previously on loan at (Belgium) Lommel)
27	DF	AUT	Thomas Kofler (from Wacker Innsbruck)
30	MF	GHA	Seth Paintsil (from Ried)
77	FW	KOS	Donis Avdijaj (from (Cyprus) AEL Limassol)

Out:

No.	Pos.	Nation	Player
4	DF	AUT	Michael Huber (to GAK)
6	DF	AUT	Andreas Lienhart (retired)
7	MF	AUT	Julius Ertlthaler (free agent)
8	MF	NGR	Samson Tijani (loan return to Red Bull Salzburg)
9	MF	SLO	Rajko Rep (to (Romania) Sepsi OSK)
10	MF	AUT	Stefan Rakowitz (free agent)
22	MF	AUT	Florian Flecker (to LASK)
27	MF	AUT	Lukas Ried (free agent)
29	MF	AUT	Sascha Horvath (to LASK)
32	DF	AUT	Felix Luckeneder (to LASK)
39	DF	AUT	Stefan Gölles (on loan to Lafnitz)
42	MF	MLI	Bakary Nimaga (to (Hungary) Zalaegerszegi)
45	FW	AUT	Seifedin Chabbi (to Ried)

== Pre-season and friendlies ==
Win Draw Loss

26 June 2021 Friendly	SC Weiz (Austria)	2–6	(Austria) Hartberg	Weiz, Austria
18:00 CEST (UTC+2)				Stadium: SIEMENS Energy Stadion

30 June 2021 Friendly	Hartberg (Austria)	0–0	(Austria) Vorwärts Steyr	Hartberg, Austria
18:45 CEST (UTC+2)				Stadium: Profertil Arena Hartberg

3 July 2021 Friendly	Hartberg (Austria)	3–2	(Austria) SV Lafnitz	Sankt Johann in der Haide, Austria
18:00 CEST (UTC+2)				Stadium: RM-Stadion

7 July 2021 Friendly	Hartberg (Austria)	Cancelled	(Austria) Kapfenberger SV	Austria
18:00 CEST (UTC+2)

9 July 2021 Friendly	Hartberg (Austria)	0–1	(Russia) Lokomotiv Moscow	Großpetersdorf, Austria
18:00 CEST (UTC+2)			Chyorny 34'	Stadium: Elektro Unger Arena Großpetersdorf

13 July 2021 Friendly	SV Oberwart (Austria)	1–0	(Austria) Hartberg	Austria
18:30 CEST (UTC+2)

6 October 2021 Friendly	Hartberg (Austria)	1–0	(Austria) Kapfenberger SV	Großpetersdorf, Austria
20:30 CEST (UTC+2)				Stadium: Elektro Unger Arena

11 November 2021 Friendly	Hartberg (Austria)	1–1	(Slovenia) Bravo	Bad Waltersdorf, Austria
14:30 CET (UTC+1)				Stadium: Thermenstadion

22 January 2022 Friendly	Lviv (Ukraine)	0–0	(Austria) Hartberg	Belek, Turkey
19:00 TRT (UTC+3)				Stadium: Arcadia Futbol Kompleksi

== Competitions ==
=== Overall record ===
Competition	First match	Last match	Starting round	Final position	Record							
Competition	First match	Last match	Starting round	Final position	Pld	W	D	L	GF	GA	GD	Win %
Austrian Football Bundesliga	24 July 2021	20 May 2022	Matchday 1	10th	32	7	12	13	43	47	−4	21.88
Austrian Cup	16 July 2021	2 March 2022	First round	Semi-finals	5	4	0	1	10	5	+5	80.00
Total					37	11	12	14	53	52	+1	29.73

Source: Soccerway

=== Austrian Football Bundesliga ===
==== Regular stage ====
Austrian Bundesliga regular season table
Pos	Team	Pld	W	D	L	GF	GA	GD	Pts	Qualification
8	LASK	22	6	7	9	28	29	−1	25	Qualification for the Relegation round
9	WSG Tirol	22	5	8	9	30	42	−12	23	Qualification for the Relegation round
10	Hartberg	22	5	7	10	29	35	−6	22	Qualification for the Relegation round
11	Admira Wacker Mödling	22	4	8	10	25	31	−6	20	Qualification for the Relegation round
12	Rheindorf Altach	22	3	4	15	10	38	−28	13	Qualification for the Relegation round

Source: Austrian Football Bundesliga
Rules for classification: 1) Points; 2) Head-to-head record; 3) Goal difference; 4) Goals scored; 5) Matches won; 6) Away matches won; 7) Away goals scored.

==== Results summary ====
Overall								Home						Away					
Pld	W	D	L	GF	GA	GD	Pts	W	D	L	GF	GA	GD	W	D	L	GF	GA	GD
22	5	7	10	29	35	−6	22	2	4	5	14	18	−4	3	3	5	15	17	−2

Source: Austrian Football Bundesliga

==== Results by round ====
Round	1	2	3	4	5	6	7	8	9	10	11	12	13	14	15	16	17	18	19	20	21	22
Ground	A	H	A	H	A	H	A	A	H	H	A	H	A	H	A	H	A	H	H	A	A	H
Result	W	L	L	D	D	L	W	D	L	W	D	D	W	L	L	W	L	D	D	L	L	L
Position	2	7	10	7	10	11	5	6	8	5	6	6	4	6	8	6	8	8	8	9	9	10

Source: Austrian Football Bundesliga
A = Away; H = Home; W = Win; D = Draw; L = Loss

==== Matches ====
The league fixtures were announced on 22 June 2021.

24 July 2021 1	Rapid Wien	0–2	Hartberg	Vienna
17:00 CEST (UTC+2)		Report	Tadić 40', 67' (pen.)	Stadium: Allianz Stadion; Attendance: 12,200; Referee: Manuel Schüttengruber

31 July 2021 2	Hartberg	1–2	Rheindorf Altach	Hartberg
17:00 CEST (UTC+2)				Stadium: Profertil Arena Hartberg

7 August 2021 3	Austria Klagenfurt	4–3	Hartberg	Klagenfurt
17:00 CEST (UTC+2)				Stadium: Wörthersee Stadion

14 August 2021 4	Hartberg	1–1	Ried	Hartberg
17:00 CEST (UTC+2)				Stadium: Profertil Arena Hartberg

22 August 2021 5	LASK	1–1	Hartberg	Linz
17:00 CEST (UTC+2)				Stadium: Waldstadion Pasching

28 August 2021 6	Hartberg	0–1	Red Bull Salzburg	Hartberg
17:00 CEST (UTC+2)	Sonnleitner (yellow card) 31'; Stec (yellow card) 63'	Report	Capaldo 44'	Stadium: Profertil Arena Hartberg; Attendance: 2,529; Referee: Stefan Ebner

11 September 2021 7	Wolfsberger AC	1–3	Hartberg	Wolfsberg
17:00 CEST (UTC+2)				Stadium: Lavanttal-Arena

18 September 2021 8	Admira Wacker Mödling	1–1	Hartberg	Maria Enzersdorf
17:00 CEST (UTC+2)				Stadium: BSFZ-Arena

26 September 2021 9	Hartberg	3–4	Austria Wien	Hartberg
14:30 CEST (UTC+2)				Stadium: Profertil Arena Hartberg

3 October 2021 10	Hartberg	3–2	Sturm Graz	Hartberg
14:30 CEST (UTC+2)	Horvat 19'; Niemann 21'; Heil (yellow card) 47'; Sturm 81'	Report	Jantscher 48' (pen.); Niangbo 87'	Stadium: Profertil Arena Hartberg; Attendance: 4,631; Referee: Manuel Schüttengruber

17 October 2021 11	WSG Tirol	2–2	Hartberg	Innsbruck
14:30 CEST (UTC+2)				Stadium: Tivoli Stadion Tirol

24 October 2021 12	Hartberg	1–1	Rapid Wien	Hartberg
14:30 CEST (UTC+2)	Rotter 90+7'	Report	Fountas 11'	Stadium: Profertil Arena Hartberg; Attendance: 4,500; Referee: Sebastian Gishamer

30 October 2021 13	Rheindorf Altach	0–2	Hartberg	Altach
17:00 CEST (UTC+2)				Stadium: Stadion Schnabelholz

6 November 2021 14	Hartberg	0–2	Austria Klagenfurt	Hartberg
17:00 CET (UTC+1)				Stadium: Profertil Arena Hartberg

20 November 2021 15	Ried	1–0	Hartberg	Ried im Innkreis
17:00 CET (UTC+1)	Bajic 34'	Report		Stadium: Keine Sorgen Arena; Attendance: 3,680; Referee: Walter Altmann

28 November 2021 16	Hartberg	2–1	LASK	Hartberg
14:30 CET (UTC+1)	Tadić 71', 90+4'	Report	Karamoko 35'	Stadium: Profertil Arena Hartberg; Attendance: 0 Referee: Markus Hameter

4 December 2021 17	Red Bull Salzburg	2–1	Hartberg	Wals-Siezenheim
17:00 CET (UTC+1)	Kristensen 79'; Adeyemi (yellow card) 79'; Onguéné 86'	Report	Niemann 10'; Horvat (yellow card) 19'; Avdijaj (yellow card) 66'; Swete (yellow card) 79'	Stadium: Stadion Wals-Siezenheim; Attendance: 0 Referee: Dieter Muckenhammer

11 December 2021 18	Hartberg	2–2	Wolfsberger AC	Hartberg
17:00 CET (UTC+1)	Avdijaj 35'; Sonnleitner 90+2'	Report	Baribo 16'; Vizinger 20'	Stadium: Profertil Arena Hartberg; Attendance: 0 Referee: Harald Lechner

13 February 2022 19	Hartberg	1–1	Admira Wacker Mödling	Hartberg
14:30 CET (UTC+1)	Heil 63'	Report	Vodháněl 44'	Stadium: Profertil Arena Hartberg; Attendance: 1,637; Referee: Stefan Ebner

19 February 2022 20	Austria Wien	2–0	Hartberg	Vienna
17:00 CET (UTC+1)	Jukic 18'; Fischer 55'	Report		Stadium: Generali Arena; Attendance: 7,068; Referee: Dieter Muckenhammer

27 February 2022 21	Sturm Graz	3–0	Hartberg	Graz
17:00 CET (UTC+1)	Hierländer 56'; Wüthrich 75'; Højlund 90' (pen.)	Report		Stadium: Merkur-Arena; Attendance: 11,243; Referee: Manuel Schüttengruber

6 March 2022 22	Hartberg	0–1	WSG Tirol	Hartberg
17:00 CET (UTC+1)		Report	Blume 5'	Stadium: Profertil Arena Hartberg; Attendance: 1,293; Referee: Christopher Jager

==== Relegation round ====
Austrian Bundesliga relegation round table
Pos	Team	Pld	W	D	L	GF	GA	GD	Pts	Qualification	WAT	LIN	ALT	RIE	HAR	ADM
1	WSG Tirol	32	10	10	12	46	58	−12	28	Qualification for the Europa Conference League play-offs	—	4–0	0–3	2–0	4–2	0–0
2	LASK	32	9	12	11	44	42	+2	26	Qualification for the Europa Conference League play-offs	6–0	—	2–1	0–2	3–3	3–1
3	Rheindorf Altach	32	7	8	17	24	49	−25	22		2–1	0–0	—	1–1	0–0	2–2
4	Ried	32	8	13	11	40	54	−14	22		2–3	1–1	1–2	—	0–0	1–1
5	Hartberg	32	7	12	13	43	47	−4	22		0–1	0–0	4–0	1–1	—	1–2
6	Admira Wacker Mödling (R)	32	6	13	13	36	46	−10	21	Relegation to Austrian Football Second League	1–1	1–1	0–3	2–0	1–3	—

Source: Austrian Bundesliga
Legend: Blue = home team win; Yellow = draw; Red = away team win.
Rules for classification: 1) Points; 2) Points with (possible) half points subtracted due to rounding; 3) Head-to-head points; 4) Head-to-head goal difference; 5) Head-to-head goals scored; 6) Head-to-head away goals scored; 7) Goal difference; 8) Goals scored; 9) Matches won; 10) Away matches won; 11) Away goals scored.
(R) Relegated

==== Results summary ====
Overall								Home						Away					
Pld	W	D	L	GF	GA	GD	Pts	W	D	L	GF	GA	GD	W	D	L	GF	GA	GD
10	2	5	3	14	12	+2	11	1	2	2	6	4	+2	1	3	1	8	8	0

Source: Austrian Football Bundesliga

==== Results by round ====
Round	1	2	3	4	5	6	7	8	9	10
Ground	A	H	H	A	H	A	H	A	A	H
Result	D	D	L	D	L	W	W	D	L	D
Position	4	4	5	6	6	5	3	3	4	5

Source: Austrian Football Bundesliga
A = Away; H = Home; W = Win; D = Draw; L = Loss

==== Matches ====
12 March 2022 23	Rheindorf Altach	0–0	Hartberg	Altach
17:00 CET (UTC+1)		Report		Stadium: Stadion Schnabelholz; Attendance: 2,487; Referee: Gerhard Grobelnik

20 March 2022 24	Hartberg	0–0	WSG Tirol	Hartberg
14:30 CET (UTC+1)		Report		Stadium: Profertil Arena Hartberg; Attendance: 1,604; Referee: Julian Weinberger

2 April 2022 25	Hartberg	0–1	WSG Tirol	Hartberg
17:00 CEST (UTC+2)		Report	Ogrinec 8'	Stadium: Profertil Arena Hartberg; Attendance: 986; Referee: Markus Hameter

9 April 2022 26	Ried	0–0	Hartberg	Ried im Innkreis
17:00 CEST (UTC+2)		Report		Stadium: Keine Sorgen Arena; Attendance: 3,837; Referee: Daniel Pfister

16 April 2022 27	Hartberg	1–2	Admira Wacker Mödling	Hartberg
17:00 CEST (UTC+2)	Kainz 51'	Report	Kerschbaum 13' (pen.); Surdanovic 41'	Stadium: Profertil Arena Hartberg; Attendance: 1,197; Referee: Gerhard Grobelnik

23 April 2022 28	Admira Wacker Mödling	1–3	Hartberg	Maria Enzersdorf
17:00 CEST (UTC+2)	Mustapha 90+2'	Report	Heil 23'; Tadić 33'; Paintsil 75'	Stadium: BSFZ-Arena; Attendance: 1,499; Referee: Andreas Heiss

26 April 2022 29	Hartberg	4–0	Rheindorf Altach	Hartberg
18:30 CEST (UTC+2)	Tadić 62' (pen.); Paintsil 74', 88'; Aydın 76'	Report		Stadium: Profertil Arena Hartberg; Attendance: 2,246; Referee: Stefan Ebner

7 May 2022 30	LASK	3–3	Hartberg	Linz
17:00 CEST (UTC+2)	Nakamura 11', 25'; Goiginger 52'	Report	Aydın 22'; Niemann 28'; Avdijaj 83'	Stadium: Waldstadion Pasching; Attendance: 5,182; Referee: Stefan Ebner

14 May 2022 31	WSG Tirol	4–2	Hartberg	Innsbruck
17:00 CEST (UTC+2)	Steinwender 36' (o.g.); Sabitzer 52'; Vrioni 71'; Ranacher 83'	Report	Gollner 63'; Paintsil 86'	Stadium: Tivoli Stadion Tirol; Attendance: 2,564; Referee: Harald Lechner

20 May 2022 32	Hartberg	1–1	Ried	Hartberg
19:00 CEST (UTC+2)	Avdijaj 5'	Report	Chabbi 71'	Stadium: Profertil Arena Hartberg; Attendance: 3,638; Referee: Walter Altmann

=== Austrian Cup ===
16 July 2021 First round	TuS Bad Gleichenberg	0–3	Hartberg	Bad Gleichenberg
19:00 CEST (UTC+2)		Report	Sonnleitner 6'; Tadić 13'; Horvath 79'	Stadium: Bad Gleichenberg Arena; Referee: Christian-Petru Ciochirca

21 September 2021 Second round	Union Raiffeisen Gurten	0–1	Hartberg	Hartberg
18:00 CEST (UTC+2)		Report	Niemann 50'	Stadium: Stadion Hartberg; Attendance: 650; Referee: Josef Spurny

2 November 2021 Third round	Blau-Weiß Linz	2–3	Hartberg	Linz
19:00 CET (UTC+1)	Seidl 71'; Plojer 81'	Report	Tadić 9', 32', 35'	Stadium: Linzer Stadion; Attendance: 1,000; Referee: Alain Sadikovski

5 February 2022 Quarter-finals	Rapid Wien	1–2	Hartberg	Vienna
16:30 CET (UTC+1)	Knasmüllner 7'	Report	Heil 24'; Sturm 45+2'	Stadium: Allianz Stadion; Attendance: 2,000; Referee: Christopher Jäger

2 March 2022 Semi-finals	Ried	2–1	Hartberg	Ried im Innkreis
18:00 CET (UTC+1)	Seiwald 61'; Wießmeier 71' (pen.)	Report	Sturm 76'	Stadium: Josko Arena; Attendance: 3,700; Referee: Sebastian Gishamer
