= List of Austrian football transfers summer 2020 =

This is a list of Austrian football transfers for the 2020 summer transfer window. Only transfers featuring Austrian Football Bundesliga are listed.

== Austrian Football Bundesliga ==
Note: Flags indicate national team as has been defined under FIFA eligibility rules. Players may hold more than one non-FIFA nationality.

=== Red Bull Salzburg ===
In:

| No. | Pos. | Nation | Player |
|---|---|---|---|
| 22 | DF | FRA | Oumar Solet (from (France) Lyon) |
| — | MF | NGA | Samson Tijani (from (Nigeria) Collins Edwin) |
| — | MF | MLI | Mamadou Sangare (from (Mali) Yeelen) |

Out:

| No. | Pos. | Nation | Player |
|---|---|---|---|
| 9 | FW | KOR | Hwang Hee-chan (to (Germany) RB Leipzig) |
| 23 | GK | SUI | Philipp Köhn (on loan to (Switzerland) Wil) |
| — | MF | NGA | Samson Tijani (on loan to TSV Hartberg) |
| — | MF | MLI | Mamadou Sangare (on loan to Liefering) |
| — | DF | BIH | Darko Todorović (on loan to (Croatia) Hajduk Split, previously on loan at (Germany) Holstein Kiel) |
| — | DF | GHA | Gideon Mensah (on loan to (Portugal) Vitória Guimarães, previously on loan at (Belgium) Zulte Waregem) |
| — | DF | GER | Kilian Ludewig (on loan to (Germany) Schalke 04, previously on loan at (England) Barnsley) |
| — | MF | BRA | Luis Phelipe (on loan to (Brazil) Bragantino, previously on loan at Liefering) |
| — | MF | SVK | Peter Pokorný (on loan to SKN St. Pölten, previously on loan at Liefering) |
| — | FW | GHA | Samuel Tetteh (on loan to (United States) New York Red Bulls, previously on loan at LASK) |
| — | DF | AUT | Luca Meisl (to SV Ried, previously on loan at SKN St. Pölten) |
| — | FW | BIH | Smail Prevljak (to (Belgium) Eupen, previously on loan) |

=== Rapid Wien ===
In:

| No. | Pos. | Nation | Player |
|---|---|---|---|
| 8 | MF | AUT | Marcel Ritzmaier (on loan from (England) Barnsley) |
| 21 | GK | AUT | Bernhard Unger (from SV Mattersburg II) |

Out:

| No. | Pos. | Nation | Player |
|---|---|---|---|
| 8 | MF | AUT | Stefan Schwab (to (Greece) PAOK) |
| 10 | MF | AUT | Thomas Murg (to (Greece) PAOK) |
| 21 | GK | AUT | Tobias Knoflach (free agent) |
| 24 | DF | AUT | Stephan Auer (to Admira Wacker) |
| — | FW | SRB | Andrija Pavlović (to (Sweden) Brøndby, previously on loan at (Cyprus) APOEL) |

=== Wolfsberger AC ===
In:

| No. | Pos. | Nation | Player |
|---|---|---|---|
| 2 | DF | GEO | Guram Giorbelidze (from (Georgia (country)) Dila Gori) |
| 4 | DF | AUT | Jonathan Scherzer (from Admira Wacker) |
| 6 | MF | AUT | Mario Pavelić (from (Croatia) Rijeka, previously on loan at Admira Wacker) |
| 7 | MF | ISR | Eliel Peretz (from (Israel) Hapoel Hadera) |
| 9 | FW | SRB | Dejan Joveljić (on loan from (Germany) Eintracht Frankfurt, previously on loan at (Belgium) Anderlecht) |
| 11 | FW | CRO | Dario Vizinger (from (Slovenia) Celje) |
| 22 | DF | AUT | Dominik Baumgartner (from (Germany) VfL Bochum, previously on loan) |
| 30 | MF | AUT | Matthäus Taferner (from (Germany) Dynamo Dresden, previously on loan at Wacker Innsbruck) |
| 44 | DF | GEO | Luka Lochoshvili (from (Georgia (country)) Dinamo Tbilisi) |

Out:

| No. | Pos. | Nation | Player |
|---|---|---|---|
| 4 | DF | AUT | Manfred Gollner (to TSV Hartberg) |
| 6 | FW | AUT | Marcel Holzer (on loan to Amstetten) |
| 7 | DF | GER | Lukas Schmitz (to (Netherlands) VVV-Venlo) |
| 9 | FW | ISR | Shon Weissman (to (Spain) Real Valladolid) |
| 11 | MF | AUT | Romano Schmid (loan return to (Germany) Werder Bremen) |
| 13 | FW | AUT | Alexander Schmidt (loan return to Liefering) |
| 14 | DF | AUT | Stefan Gölles (to TSV Hartberg) |
| 17 | MF | AUT | Joshua Steiger (on loan to SV Lafnitz) |
| 20 | MF | AUT | Bajram Syla (on loan to SV Lafnitz) |
| 21 | MF | SRB | Miloš Jojić (loan return to (Turkey) İstanbul Başakşehir) |
| 28 | DF | POR | Miguel Vieira (loan return to (Turkey) İstanbul Başakşehir) |

=== LASK ===
In:

| No. | Pos. | Nation | Player |
|---|---|---|---|
| 9 | FW | FRA | Mamoudou Karamoko (from (Germany) VfL Wolfsburg II) |
| 13 | FW | GER | Johannes Eggestein (on loan from (Germany) Werder Bremen) |
| 17 | FW | AUT | Andreas Gruber (from SV Mattersburg) |
| 21 | MF | DEN | Mads Emil Madsen (from (Denmark) Silkeborg) |
| 22 | DF | UKR | Yevhen Cheberko (from (Ukraine) Zorya Luhansk) |
| 31 | MF | AUT | Lukas Grgic (from WSG Tirol) |
| — | GK | AUT | Nikolas Polster (from Rapid Wien II) |
| — | MF | COL | Fredy Valencia (from (Colombia) Boca Juniors) |
| — | MF | ISR | Yoav Hofmayster (from (Israel) Ramat HaSharon) |
| — | MF | AUT | Tobias Anselm (from Liefering) |
| — | FW | AUT | Alexander Schmidt (from Liefering, previously on loan at Wolfsberger AC) |

Out:

| No. | Pos. | Nation | Player |
|---|---|---|---|
| 9 | FW | BRA | Klauss (loan return to (Germany) 1899 Hoffenheim) |
| 20 | FW | GHA | Samuel Tetteh (loan return to Red Bull Salzburg) |
| 21 | DF | AUT | Markus Wostry (to Wacker Innsbruck) |
| 28 | MF | AUT | Dominik Frieser (to (England) Barnsley) |
| — | GK | AUT | Nikolas Polster (on loan to Juniors OÖ) |
| — | MF | COL | Fredy Valencia (on loan to Juniors OÖ) |
| — | MF | ISR | Yoav Hofmayster (on loan to (Israel) Ironi Kiryat Shmona) |
| — | MF | AUT | Tobias Anselm (on loan to WSG Tirol) |
| — | FW | AUT | Alexander Schmidt (on loan to SKN St. Pölten) |
| — | DF | AUT | Felix Luckeneder (to TSV Hartberg, previously on loan) |
| — | MF | GHA | Reuben Acquah (to (Croatia) Lokomotiva, previously on loan at SV Ried) |

=== TSV Hartberg ===
In:

| No. | Pos. | Nation | Player |
|---|---|---|---|
| 5 | DF | AUT | Manfred Gollner (from Wolfsberger AC) |
| 7 | MF | AUT | Julius Ertlthaler (from SV Mattersburg) |
| 8 | MF | NGA | Samson Tijani (on loan from Red Bull Salzburg) |
| 16 | DF | MLI | Hamidou Maïga (free agent) |
| 17 | MF | BFA | Abdoul Yoda (from (Burkina Faso) USFA) |
| 18 | FW | AUT | Philipp Sturm (from (Germany) Chemnitzer FC) |
| 20 | MF | AUT | Lukas Fadinger (from Sturm Graz, previously on loan at SV Lafnitz) |
| 22 | DF | AUT | Alexander Burgstaller (from Rapid Wien II) |
| 29 | MF | AUT | Sascha Horvath (from (Germany) Dynamo Dresden) |
| 32 | DF | AUT | Felix Luckeneder (from LASK, previously on loan) |
| 39 | DF | AUT | Stefan Gölles (from Wolfsberger AC) |
| 45 | FW | AUT | Seifedin Chabbi (free agent from (Turkey) Gaziantep, previously on loan at (Scotland) St Mirren) |

Out:

| No. | Pos. | Nation | Player |
|---|---|---|---|
| 7 | DF | AUT | Siegfried Rasswalder (to Knittelfeld) |
| 8 | MF | AUT | Christoph Kröpfl (to SV Lafnitz) |
| 15 | DF | AUT | Marcel Schantl (on loan to Blau-Weiß Linz) |
| 18 | MF | AUT | David Cancola (to (Czech Republic) Slovan Liberec) |
| 19 | FW | CZE | Tomáš Ostrák (loan return to (Germany) 1. FC Köln) |
| 20 | MF | BEN | Jodel Dossou (to (France) Clermont) |
| 22 | DF | MLI | Amadou Dante (loan return to Sturm Graz) |
| 29 | MF | AUT | Peter Tschernegg (to Grazer AK) |
| 40 | FW | AUT | Sandro Gotal (to (Germany) SV Donaustauf) |
| — | DF | AUT | Manuel Pfeifer (to SV Lafnitz, previously on loan at Allerheiligen) |

=== Sturm Graz ===
In:

| No. | Pos. | Nation | Player |
|---|---|---|---|
| 4 | DF | SVN | Jon Gorenc Stanković (from (England) Huddersfield Town) |
| 5 | DF | SUI | Gregory Wüthrich (from (Australia) Perth Glory) |
| 6 | DF | AUT | David Nemeth (on loan from (Germany) Mainz 05 II) |
| 11 | DF | BIH | Jusuf Gazibegović (from Liefering) |
| 19 | MF | AUT | Andreas Kuen (from SV Mattersburg) |
| 24 | DF | AUT | Sandro Ingolitsch (from SKN St. Pölten) |
| 29 | FW | ZAM | Francisco Mwepu (from (Zambia) Red Arrows) |

Out:

| No. | Pos. | Nation | Player |
|---|---|---|---|
| 4 | DF | AUT | Thomas Schrammel (free agent) |
| 5 | DF | GRE | Tasos Avlonitis (to (Italy) Ascoli) |
| 8 | DF | AUT | Emanuel Šakić (to (Greece) Aris) |
| 11 | FW | BUL | Kiril Despodov (loan return to (Italy) Cagliari) |
| 20 | DF | GHA | Isaac Donkor (to (Turkey) Adanaspor) |
| 21 | MF | ESP | Juan Domínguez (to (Greece) PAS Giannina) |
| 23 | DF | AUT | Lukas Spendlhofer (to (Italy) Ascoli) |
| 24 | MF | AUT | Christoph Leitgeb (retired) |
| 28 | MF | AUT | Winfred Amoah (on loan to Kapfenberger SV) |
| 29 | FW | AUT | Thorsten Röcher (loan return to (Germany) FC Ingolstadt 04) |
| 34 | DF | AUT | Florian Ferk (free agent) |
| 41 | GK | AUT | Christopher Giuliani (on loan to Kapfenberger SV) |
| — | FW | AUT | Oliver Bacher (on loan to Kapfenberger SV) |
| — | DF | AUT | Markus Lackner (to SV Ried, previously on loan at Admira Wacker) |
| — | MF | AUT | Lukas Fadinger (to TSV Hartberg, previously on loan at SV Lafnitz) |
| — | MF | AUT | Lukas Grozurek (to SKN St. Pölten, previously on loan at (Germany) Karlsruher SC) |

=== Austria Wien ===
In:

| No. | Pos. | Nation | Player |
|---|---|---|---|
| 2 | DF | AUT | Christoph Schösswendter (free agent from Admira Wacker) |
| 21 | GK | AUT | Ammar Helac (from Blau-Weiß Linz) |
| 29 | DF | AUT | Markus Suttner (from (Germany) Fortuna Düsseldorf) |
| 39 | MF | AUT | Georg Teigl (from (Germany) FC Augsburg) |

Out:

| No. | Pos. | Nation | Player |
|---|---|---|---|
| 2 | DF | AUT | Andreas Poulsen (loan return to (Germany) Borussia Mönchengladbach) |
| 4 | MF | AUS | James Jeggo (to (Greece) Aris) |
| 13 | GK | AUT | Ivan Lučić (free agent) |
| 16 | MF | AUT | Dominik Prokop (free agent) |
| 17 | DF | AUT | Florian Klein (free agent) |
| 22 | DF | NED | Caner Cavlan (to (Netherlands) Emmen) |
| 24 | DF | AUT | Aleksandar Borković (to (Germany) 1899 Hoffenheim) |

=== SCR Altach ===
In:

| No. | Pos. | Nation | Player |
|---|---|---|---|
| 7 | MF | AUT | Mario Stefel (from SV Horn) |
| 8 | FW | GHA | Nana Kofi Babil (on loan from (Ghana) Medeama) |
| 9 | FW | AUT | Daniel Maderner (from Amstetten) |
| 13 | GK | AUT | Tino Casali (from SV Mattersburg) |
| 17 | DF | AUT | Nosa Edokpolor (free agent from Blau-Weiß Linz) |
| 24 | DF | AUT | David Bumberger (from Juniors OÖ) |
| 25 | FW | NGA | Chinedu Obasi (free agent) |

Out:

| No. | Pos. | Nation | Player |
|---|---|---|---|
| 6 | DF | AUT | Philipp Schmiedl (to (Denmark) SønderjyskE) |
| 7 | FW | AUT | Christian Gebauer (to (Germany) Arminia Bielefeld) |
| 10 | FW | GER | Sidney Sam (to (Turkey) Antalyaspor) |
| 12 | MF | MLI | Ousmane Diakité (loan return to Red Bull Salzburg) |
| 13 | MF | AUT | Lars Nussbaumer (on loan to Dornbirn) |
| 17 | MF | AUT | Florian Jamnig (to Wacker Innsbruck) |
| 21 | DF | AUT | Leo Mätzler (on loan to (Switzerland) Wil) |
| 24 | GK | AUT | Benjamin Ozegovic (to WSG Tirol) |
| 29 | FW | PAR | Julio Villalba (loan return to (Germany) Borussia Mönchengladbach) |
| 31 | DF | AUT | Matthias Maak (to Austria Lustenau) |
| 33 | GK | AUT | Reuf Duraković (free agent) |

=== SKN St. Pölten ===
In:

| No. | Pos. | Nation | Player |
|---|---|---|---|
| 4 | DF | AUT | Michael Steinwender (from SV Mattersburg) |
| 5 | DF | AUT | Manuel Maranda (from (Germany) Carl Zeiss Jena) |
| 6 | MF | SVK | Peter Pokorný (on loan from Red Bull Salzburg, previously on loan at Liefering) |
| 8 | MF | IRN | Reza Asadi (from (Iran) Tractor) |
| 9 | FW | AUT | Alexander Schmidt (on loan from LASK) |
| 13 | GK | AUT | Armin Gremsl (from (Cyprus) Doxa Katokopias) |
| 14 | DF | AUT | Michael Blauensteiner (from Austria Wien II) |
| 16 | DF | HUN | Martin Majnovics (from SV Mattersburg) |
| 19 | FW | ISR | Dor Hugi (from (Israel) Maccabi Petah Tikva) |
| 22 | MF | AUT | Christoph Halper (from SV Mattersburg) |
| 24 | MF | AUT | Lukas Grozurek (from Sturm Graz, previously on loan at (Germany) Karlsruher SC) |

Out:

| No. | Pos. | Nation | Player |
|---|---|---|---|
| 4 | MF | AUT | Dominik Hofbauer (free agent) |
| 5 | DF | AUT | Luca Meisl (loan return to Red Bull Salzburg) |
| 6 | DF | AUT | Danijel Petrović (free agent) |
| 8 | MF | AUT | Michael Ambichl (free agent) |
| 9 | FW | JAM | Cory Burke (loan return to (United States) Philadelphia Union) |
| 14 | DF | AUT | Christoph Klarer (loan return to (England) Southampton U23) |
| 19 | FW | PRK | Pak Kwang-ryong (free agent) |
| 22 | DF | AUT | Sandro Ingolitsch (to Sturm Graz) |
| 24 | MF | AUT | Martin Rasner (free agent) |
| 31 | MF | GER | Nico Gorzel (to (Germany) Türkgücü München) |
| 33 | FW | BFA | Issiaka Ouédraogo (free agent) |
| 77 | MF | BRA | Alan (to (Turkey) Kasımpaşa) |
| 90 | FW | AUT | Lorenz Grabovac (to First Vienna) |
| — | GK | AUT | Lukas Wackerle (to Schwaz, previously on loan at Union Innsbruck) |
| — | DF | AUT | Patrick Puchegger (to Amstetten, previously on loan) |

=== Admira Wacker ===
In:

| No. | Pos. | Nation | Player |
|---|---|---|---|
| 2 | DF | AUT | Stephan Auer (from Rapid Wien) |
| 9 | FW | AUT | Stefan Maierhofer (from WSG Tirol) |
| 10 | FW | GER | Maximilian Breunig (on loan from (Germany) Würzburger Kickers) |
| 15 | DF | AUT | Lukas Rath (from SV Mattersburg) |
| 18 | DF | CMR | Phoenix Missi (from (The Gambia) Gambinos Stars) |
| 28 | GK | AUT | Osman Hadžikić (from (Switzerland) Zürich, previously on loan at (Croatia) Inter Zaprešić) |
| 29 | MF | CMR | Felix Kekoh (from (The Gambia) Gambinos Stars) |
| 37 | DF | AUT | Leonardo Lukačević (from SV Grödig, previously on loan) |
| 44 | DF | SRB | Nikola Pejović (on loan from (Croatia) Lokomotiva) |
| 90 | MF | BIH | Tomislav Tomić (from (Slovenia) Olimpija Ljubljana) |
| 97 | MF | ISR | Josef Ganda (from (Germany) FC Augsburg II) |

Out:

| No. | Pos. | Nation | Player |
|---|---|---|---|
| 2 | DF | AUT | Fabio Strauss (to Blau-Weiß Linz) |
| 5 | DF | GER | Bjarne Thoelke (free agent) |
| 6 | DF | AUT | Christoph Schösswendter (free agent to Austria Wien) |
| 10 | MF | AUT | Daniel Toth (to SV Stripfing) |
| 11 | FW | TUR | Sinan Bakış (to (Netherlands) Heracles Almelo) |
| 13 | FW | AUT | Markus Pink (to Austria Klagenfurt) |
| 17 | MF | KOR | Kim Jung-min (loan return to Liefering) |
| 18 | DF | AUT | Markus Lackner (loan return to Sturm Graz) |
| 21 | FW | GHA | Seth Paintsil (to SV Ried) |
| 25 | MF | AUT | Mario Pavelić (loan return to (Croatia) Rijeka) |
| 26 | DF | AUT | Jonathan Scherzer (to Wolfsberger AC) |
| 29 | MF | AUT | Muhammed Cham (to (France) Clermont) |
| 31 | MF | GER | Kolja Pusch (to (Germany) KFC Uerdingen) |
| 55 | DF | GER | Fabian Menig (to (Germany) Hallescher FC) |

=== WSG Tirol ===
In:

| No. | Pos. | Nation | Player |
|---|---|---|---|
| 8 | MF | AUT | Renny Smith (from (Netherlands) Dordrecht) |
| 9 | FW | DEN | Nikolai Baden Frederiksen (on loan from (Italy) Juventus U23, previously on loan at (Netherlands) Fortuna Sittard) |
| 12 | GK | AUT | Benjamin Ozegovic (from SCR Altach) |
| 17 | MF | AUT | Johannes Naschberger (from SV Wörgl) |
| 20 | MF | AUT | Tobias Anselm (on loan from LASK) |
| 21 | DF | SVN | Žan Rogelj (from (Slovenia) Triglav Kranj) |
| 28 | DF | AUT | David Schnegg (on loan from Juniors OÖ) |
| 30 | DF | AUT | Raffael Behounek (from Wacker Innsbruck) |
| 43 | MF | AUT | Nemanja Celic (from Juniors OÖ) |

Out:

| No. | Pos. | Nation | Player |
|---|---|---|---|
| 1 | GK | AUT | Pascal Grünwald (retired) |
| 3 | DF | AUT | Michael Svoboda (to (Italy) Venezia) |
| 9 | MF | AUT | Sebastian Santin (to (Switzerland) Vaduz) |
| 13 | DF | ESP | Ione Cabrera (free agent) |
| 17 | DF | GHA | Felix Adjei (free agent) |
| 18 | MF | AUT | Clemens Walch (to SPG Silz/Mötz) |
| 20 | FW | AUT | Stefan Maierhofer (to Admira Wacker) |
| 23 | MF | CRO | Dino Kovačec (to Amstetten) |
| 46 | MF | AUT | Lukas Grgic (to LASK) |

=== SV Ried ===
In:

| No. | Pos. | Nation | Player |
|---|---|---|---|
| 1 | GK | AUT | Samuel Şahin-Radlinger (from (England) Barnsley) |
| 2 | DF | AUT | Luca Meisl (from Red Bull Salzburg, previously on loan at SKN St. Pölten) |
| 5 | DF | AUT | Michael Lercher (from SV Mattersburg) |
| 7 | MF | AUT | Marcel Canadi (from Amstetten) |
| 11 | MF | AUT | Daniel Offenbacher (from (Lithuania) Sūduva) |
| 16 | DF | AUT | Markus Lackner (from Sturm Graz, previously on loan at Admira Wacker) |
| 18 | FW | HUN | Filip Borsos (from SV Mattersburg) |
| 19 | FW | GHA | Sadam Sulley (free agent from (Slovakia) Senica) |
| 20 | MF | AUT | Murat Satin (from Wacker Innsbruck) |
| 23 | DF | AUT | Manuel Haas (from (Croatia) Inter Zaprešić) |
| 30 | FW | GHA | Seth Paintsil (from Admira Wacker) |

Out:

| No. | Pos. | Nation | Player |
|---|---|---|---|
| 1 | GK | AUT | Johannes Kreidl (free agent) |
| 2 | DF | AUT | Mario Vojkovic (to (Croatia) Istra 1961) |
| 5 | DF | AUT | Bojan Lugonja (on loan to Floridsdorfer AC) |
| 7 | FW | ESP | Jefté Betancor (to (Romania) Voluntari) |
| 18 | DF | AUT | Patrick Obermüller (loan return to Rapid Wien II) |
| 19 | FW | NGA | Ugochukwu Oduenyi (free agent) |
| 20 | MF | SRB | Nemanja Zikic (to SV Wals-Grünau) |
| 30 | FW | CRO | Ivan Kovačec (to (Croatia) Zagorec Krapina) |
| 45 | MF | GHA | Reuben Acquah (loan return to LASK) |
| 61 | GK | SRB | Filip Dmitrović (free agent to (Greece) Aspropyrgos) |
| — | FW | CPV | Flavio (to Floridsdorfer AC, previously on loan at SV Stripfing) |

== See also ==
- 2020–21 Austrian Football Bundesliga
