= 2022–23 TSV Hartberg season =

TSV Hartberg
2022–23 season
- Chairman: Brigitte Annerl
- Manager: Klaus Schmidt (until 14 November); Markus Schopp (from 2 December)
- Stadium: Stadion Hartberg
- Austrian Football Bundesliga: 10th
- Austrian Cup: Second round
- Top goalscorer: League: Donis Avdijaj (7); All: Donis Avdijaj (7)

The 2022–23 season was the 77th in the history of TSV Hartberg and their fifth consecutive season in the top flight. The club participated in the Austrian Football Bundesliga and the Austrian Cup.

Manager Klaus Schmidt was dismissed on 14 November 2022, Markus Schopp was appointed as Schmidt's replacement on 2 December 2022.

== Players ==
=== First team squad ===
As of 29 August 2022

Note: Flags indicate national team as defined under FIFA eligibility rules; some limited exceptions apply. Players may hold more than one non-FIFA nationality.

No.	Pos.	Nation	Player
1	GK	(Austria) AUT	René Swete
4	MF	(Austria) AUT	Maximilian Sellinger
5	DF	(Austria) AUT	Manfred Gollner
6	MF	(Austria) AUT	Philipp Erhardt
7	MF	(Austria) AUT	Fabian Wilfinger
8	MF	(Austria) AUT	Lukas Fadinger
9	MF	(Turkey) TUR	Okan Aydın
10	FW	(Israel) ISR	Eylon Almog (on loan from Maccabi Tel Aviv)
11	MF	(Croatia) CRO	Matija Horvat
12	DF	(Austria) AUT	Michael Steinwender
14	DF	(Austria) AUT	Christian Klem
16	DF	(Austria) AUT	Mario Sonnleitner
17	MF	(Austria) AUT	Mario Kröpfl
18	FW	(Austria) AUT	Philipp Sturm
21	GK	(Austria) AUT	Florian Faist
22	MF	(Croatia) CRO	Marin Karamarko
23	MF	(Austria) AUT	Tobias Kainz

No.	Pos.	Nation	Player
24	FW	(Austria) AUT	Dario Tadić
26	FW	(Austria) AUT	Jakob Kolb
27	DF	(Austria) AUT	Thomas Kofler
28	MF	(Austria) AUT	Jürgen Heil
29	DF	(Austria) AUT	Patrick Farkas
30	MF	(Ghana) GHA	Seth Paintsil
31	DF	(Austria) AUT	Thomas Rotter
32	MF	(Sweden) SWE	Albert Ejupi
33	FW	(Austria) AUT	Dominik Frieser
35	GK	(Austria) AUT	Raphael Sallinger
39	FW	(Austria) AUT	René Kriwak (on loan from Rapid Wien)
44	GK	(Austria) AUT	Maximilian Pußwald
70	FW	(France) FRA	Ruben Providence (on loan from Roma)
77	DF	(Austria) AUT	Marcel Schantl
90	FW	(Romania) ROU	Patrick Gânțe
92	FW	(Austria) AUT	Jakob Knollmüller

=== Out on loan ===
Note: Flags indicate national team as defined under FIFA eligibility rules; some limited exceptions apply. Players may hold more than one non-FIFA nationality.

No. / Pos. / Nation / Player; — / GK / (Austria) AUT / Elias Scherf (at SKU Amstetten until 30 June 2023)	No. / Pos. / Nation / Player; — / FW / (Austria) AUT / Jürgen Lemmerer (at SV Lafnitz until 30 June 2023)

== Pre-season and friendlies ==
Win Draw Loss Fixtures

18 June 2022 Friendly	Hartberg	2–2	SV Lafnitz	Feldbauern
17:00 CEST (UTC+2)				Stadium: Sportplatz Mönichkirchen FC

25 June 2022 Friendly	TuS Heiligenkreuz	0–5	Hartberg	Heiligenkreuz am Waasen
17:30 CEST (UTC+2)				Stadium: Sportplatz TuS Heiligenkreuz

29 June 2022 Friendly	Hartberg	1–0	(Romania) Universitatea Cluj	Hartberg
17:30 CEST (UTC+2)				Stadium: Profertil Arena Hartberg

2 July 2022 Friendly	St. Pölten	4–0	Hartberg	Aspang Markt
16:30 CEST (UTC+2)				Stadium: Sportplatz Aspang

9 July 2022 Friendly	Hartberg	1–2	(Hungary) Zalaegerszeg	Hartberg
18:00 CEST (UTC+2)				Stadium: Profertil Arena Hartberg

23 September 2022 Friendly	Hartberg	1–0	First Vienna	Hartberg
16:00 CEST (UTC+2)				Stadium: Profertil Arena Hartberg

18 November 2022 Friendly	Hartberg	1–3	Floridsdorfer AC	Hartberg
11:00 CET (UTC+1)				Stadium: Profertil Arena Hartberg

18 November 2022 Friendly	Kapfenberger SV	2–2	Hartberg	Kapfenberg
15:00 CET (UTC+1)				Stadium: Franz-Fekete-Stadion

25 November 2022 Friendly	First Vienna	1–2	Hartberg	Vienna
14:00 CET (UTC+1)				Stadium: Naturarena Hohe Warte

2 December 2022 Friendly	St. Pölten	v	Hartberg	Sankt Pölten
15:00 CET (UTC+1)				Stadium: NV Arena

== Competitions ==
=== Austrian Football Bundesliga ===
==== Regular stage ====
===== League table =====
Pos	Team	Pld	W	D	L	GF	GA	GD	Pts	Qualification
8	Austria Lustenau	22	7	6	9	29	37	−8	27	Qualification for the Relegation round
9	Wolfsberger AC	22	6	3	13	35	41	−6	21	Qualification for the Relegation round
10	Hartberg	22	5	3	14	22	42	−20	18	Qualification for the Relegation round
11	SV Ried	22	4	6	12	16	32	−16	18	Qualification for the Relegation round
12	Rheindorf Altach	22	4	5	13	22	44	−22	17	Qualification for the Relegation round

Source: Austrian Football Bundesliga
Rules for classification: 1) Points; 2) Head-to-head record; 3) Goal difference; 4) Goals scored; 5) Matches won; 6) Away matches won; 7) Away goals scored.

===== Matches =====
The league fixtures were announced on 22 June 2022.

Win	Draw	Loss

Date	Time	Opponent	Venue	Result F–A	Scorers	Attendance	Ref.
24 July 2022	17:00	Rheindorf Altach	H	2–1	Avdijaj 45+1', 77'	1,943	
31 July 2022	17:00	WSG Tirol	A	1–2	Aydın 37'	1,926	
6 August 2022	19:30	RB Salzburg	H	0–2		2,659	
14 August 2022	17:00	Austria Lustenau	A	1–4	Tadić 8' pen.	3,531	
27 August 2022	17:00	SV Ried	H	2–0	Almog 62', Tadić 90+1'	1,619	
3 September 2022	17:00	Sturm Graz	A	0–0		11,427	
11 September 2022	14:30	Austria Wien	H	0–3		2,905	
17 September 2022	17:00	Wolfsberger AC	A	1–3	Tadić 25' pen.	2,409	
2 October 2022	14:30	Austria Klagenfurt	H	2–3	Tadić 16' pen., Kriwak 56'	1,721	
8 October 2022	17:00	LASK	A	3–0	Kriwak 55', Tadić 62', Horvat 78'	4,499	
16 October 2022	14:30	Rheindorf Altach	A	0–1		4,677	
22 October 2022	17:00	WSG Tirol	H	1–5	Fadinger 8'	1,673	
26 October 2022	16:00	Rapid Wien	A	1–5	Aydın 44'	15,837	
29 October 2022	17:00	RB Salzburg	A	0–1		10,345	
5 November 2022	17:00	Austria Lustenau	H	1–1	Providence 58'	1,966	
12 November 2022	17:00	Rapid Wien	H	1–2	Aydın 44'	4,607	
12 February 2023	14:30	SV Ried	A	1–0	Frieser 78'	3,284	
18 February 2023	17:00	Sturm Graz	H	1–2	Tadić 75'	4,624	
25 February 2023	17:00	Austria Wien	A	0–3		10,263	
4 March 2023	17:00	Wolfsberger AC	H	2–1	Prokop 16', Providence 90'	2,498	
12 March 2023	17:00	Austria Klagenfurt	A	0–1		3,646	
19 March 2023	17:00	LASK	H	2–2	Fadinger 29', Providence 75'	2,375	

==== Relegation round ====
===== League table =====
Pos	Team	Pld	W	D	L	GF	GA	GD	Pts	Qualification	WOL	LUS	WAT	HAR	ALT	RIE
1	Wolfsberger AC	32	12	6	14	51	51	0	31	Qualification for the Europa Conference League play-offs	—	2–2	2–0	2–2	0–0	1–0
2	Austria Lustenau	32	11	10	11	50	54	−4	29	Qualification for the Europa Conference League play-offs	1–3	—	2–4	5–1	1–0	2–2
3	WSG Tirol	32	10	8	14	44	53	−9	24		4–0	0–2	—	1–1	1–1	1–1
4	Hartberg	32	9	6	17	39	56	−17	24		0–2	0–1	5–0	—	2–2	2–0
5	Rheindorf Altach	32	6	10	16	29	53	−24	19		0–2	1–1	1–0	0–1	—	1–1
6	Ried (R)	32	4	11	17	27	50	−23	14	Relegation to Austrian Football Second League	1–2	4–4	1–1	1–3	0–1	—

Rules for classification: 1) Points; 2) Points with (possible) half points subtracted due to rounding; 3) Head-to-head points; 4) Head-to-head goal difference; 5) Head-to-head goals scored; 6) Head-to-head away goals scored; 7) Goal difference; 8) Goals scored; 9) Matches won; 10) Away matches won; 11) Away goals scored.
(R) Relegated

===== Matches =====
Win	Draw	Loss

Date	Time	Opponent	Venue	Result F–A	Scorers	Attendance	Ref.
31 March 2023	19:30	Austria Lustenau	H	0–1		1,827	
8 April 2023	17:00	SV Ried	A	3–1	Avdijaj 19', Heil 63', Prokop 83'	3,038	
15 April 2023	17:00	Rheindorf Altach	H	2–2	Heil 58', Prokop 60'	2,607	
21 April 2023	19:30	Wolfsberger AC	A	2–2	Sangare 5', Tadić 53'	2,390	
29 April 2023	17:00	WSG Tirol	A	1–1	Avdijaj 90+5'	1,629	
6 May 2023	17:00	WSG Tirol	H	5–0	Providence 6', 34', Bacher 9' o.g., Avdijaj 39' pen., Prokop 65'	2,049	
13 May 2023	17:00	Rheindorf Altach	A	1–0	Sangare 13'	4,134	
20 May 2023	17:00	Wolfsberger AC	H	0–2		3,456	
27 May 2023	17:00	SV Ried	H	2–0	Providence 65', Avdijaj 76'	2,390	
2 June 2023	19:30	Austria Lustenau	A	1–5	Avdijaj 79'	4,296	

=== Austrian Cup ===
Win	Draw	Loss

Round	Date	Time	Opponent	Venue	Result F–A	Scorers	Attendance	Ref.
First round	15 July 2022	19:00	DSV Leoben	A	2–1	Aydın 32', Heil 34'	2,400	
Second round	31 August 2022	19:00	FC Dornbirn 1913	A	2–3	Almog 45+2', Steinwender 90+3'	850	
