= Gölles (surname) =

Gölles is a surname. Notable people with the surname include:

- Julian Gölles (born 1999), Austrian footballer
- Stefan Gölles (born 1991), Austrian footballer
