= Jürgen Heil =

Austrian footballer

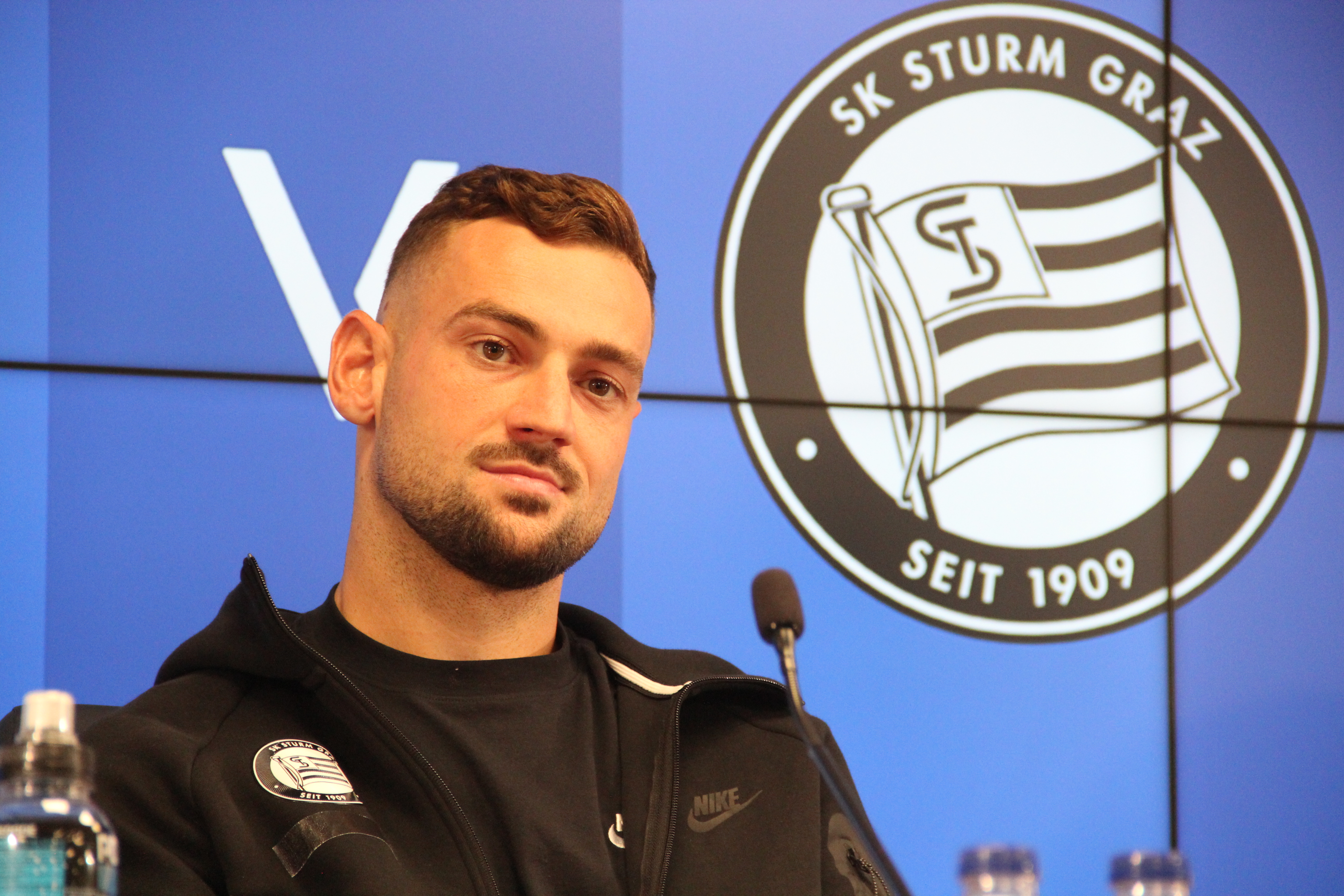
- Heil in 2026

Personal information
- Date of birth: 4 April 1997 (age 29)
- Place of birth: Anger, Austria
- Height: 1.76 m (5 ft 9 in)
- Position: Midfielder

Team information
- Current team: Sturm Graz
- Number: 28

Youth career
- 2002–2012: SV Anger

Senior career*
Years	Team	Apps	(Gls)
2012–2015	SV Anger	75	(8)
2015–2026	TSV Hartberg	305	(15)
2026–	Sturm Graz	8	(1)

International career
2013	Austria U16	2	(0)
- * Club domestic league appearances and goals as of 18 October 2026

Jürgen Heil (born 4 April 1997) is an Austrian professional footballer who plays as a midfielder and captains Austrian Bundesliga club Sturm Graz.

== Club career ==
He made his Austrian Football First League debut for TSV Hartberg on 21 July 2017 in a game against WSG Wattens.

== Career statistics ==
As of match played 29 October 2026

Club statistics
Club	Season	League			National Cup		Continental		Other		Total	
Club	Season	Division	Apps	Goals	Apps	Goals	Apps	Goals	Apps	Goals	Apps	Goals
SV Anger	2011–12	Landesliga Steiermark	1	1	0	0	—		—		1	1
SV Anger	2012–13	Landesliga Steiermark	20	1	0	0	—		—		20	1
SV Anger	2013–14	Landesliga Steiermark	25	4	0	0	—		—		25	4
SV Anger	2014–15	Landesliga Steiermark	29	2	0	0	—		—		29	2
SV Anger	Total		75	8	0	0	0	0	0	0	75	8
TSV Hartberg	2015–16	Regionalliga Mitte	29	0	1	0	—		—		30	0
TSV Hartberg	2016–17	Regionalliga Mitte	28	2	2	0	—		—		30	2
TSV Hartberg	2017–18	Austrian Football First League	29	2	3	0	—		—		32	2
TSV Hartberg	2018–19	Austrian Football Bundesliga	8	0	1	0	—		—		9	0
TSV Hartberg	2019–20	Austrian Football Bundesliga	22	0	1	0	—		—		23	0
TSV Hartberg	2020–21	Austrian Football Bundesliga	26	0	3	1	—		1 (Note: Appearance in the 2020–21 Austrian Football Bundesliga Europa Conference League play-offs)	0	30	1
TSV Hartberg	2021–22	Austrian Football Bundesliga	30	4	4	1	—		—		34	5
TSV Hartberg	2022–23	Austrian Football Bundesliga	29	2	2	1	—		—		31	3
TSV Hartberg	2023–24	Austrian Football Bundesliga	32	2	3	0	—		—		35	2
TSV Hartberg	2024–25	Austrian Football Bundesliga	31	1	6	0	—		1 (Note: Appearance in European play-offs)	0	38	1
TSV Hartberg	2025–26	Austrian Football Bundesliga	27	2	2	1	—		—		29	3
TSV Hartberg	Total		305	15	31	4	0	0	2	0	321	19
Sturm Graz	2026–27	Austrian Bundesliga	8	1	2	0	6 (Note: Four appearance and one goal in UEFA Champions League, two appearances in UEFA Europa League)	1	—		16	2
Career total			374	24	33	4	6	1	2	0	412	29
