= Donis Avdijaj =

German-born Kosovan footballer (born 1996)

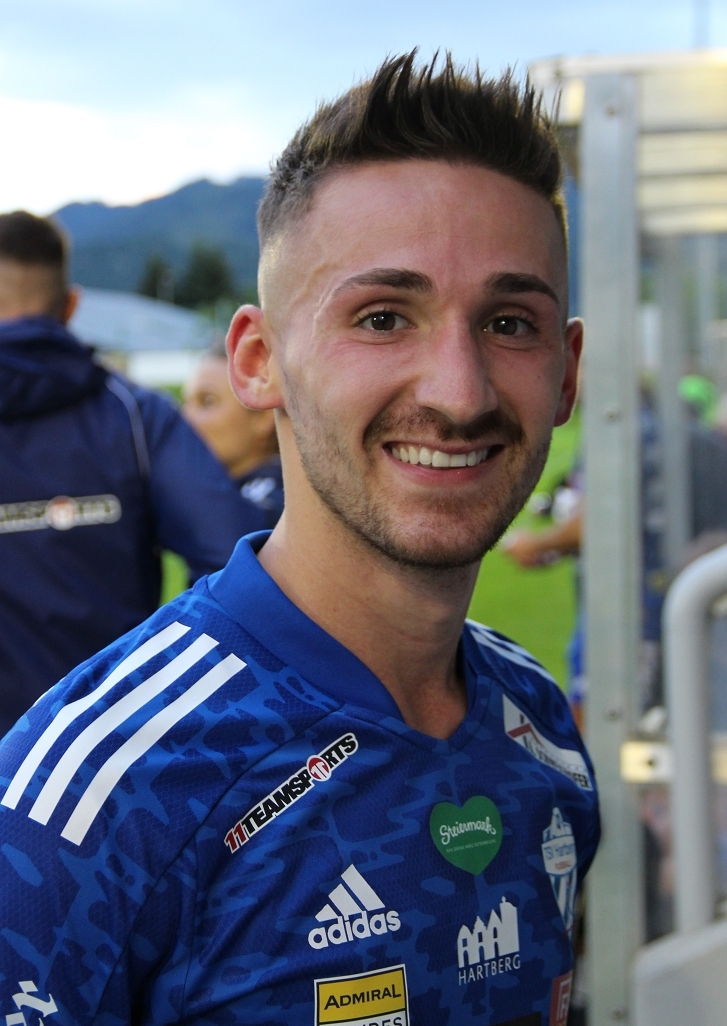
- Avdijaj with TSV Hartberg in 2021

Personal information
- Full name: Donis Xhemë Avdijaj
- Date of birth: 25 August 1996 (age 30)
- Place of birth: Osnabrück, Germany
- Height: 1.72 m (5 ft 8 in)
- Position: Forward

Team information
- Current team: Wolfsberger AC
- Number: 10

Youth career
- 2001–2006: SV Atter
- 2006–2011: VfL Osnabrück
- 2011–2014: Schalke 04

Senior career*
| Years | Team | Apps | (Gls) |
| 2014 | Schalke 04 II | 11 | (4) |
| 2014–2018 | Schalke 04 | 9 | (2) |
| 2014–2016 | → Sturm Graz (loan) | 42 | (9) |
| 2018 | → Roda JC (loan) | 11 | (3) |
| 2018–2019 | Willem II | 15 | (4) |
| 2019–2020 | Trabzonspor | 8 | (1) |
| 2020 | Heart of Midlothian | 3 | (0) |
| 2020–2021 | Emmen | 8 | (0) |
| 2021 | AEL Limassol | 9 | (0) |
| 2021–2022 | TSV Hartberg | 19 | (7) |
| 2022–2023 | Zürich | 9 | (0) |
| 2023 | → TSV Hartberg (loan) | 15 | (5) |
| 2023–2025 | TSV Hartberg | 54 | (16) |
| 2025– | Wolfsberger AC | 34 | (3) |

International career
| 2011–2012 | Germany U16 | 2 | (2) |
| 2012–2013 | Germany U17 | 13 | (10) |
| 2014 | Germany U19 | 2 | (0) |
| 2017–2018 | Kosovo | 6 | (2) |
- * Club domestic league appearances and goals as of 12:14, 30 May 2026 (UTC)

Donis Xhemë Avdijaj (born 25 August 1996) is a professional footballer who plays as a forward for Austrian Bundesliga club Wolfsberger AC. Born in Germany, he represented the Kosovo national team.

== Club career ==
=== Schalke 04 ===
After scoring 59 goals in 53 matches for U17 and 17 goals in 24 games for U19, Avdijaj became a first team player. He was called up for the first time in a major competition on 17 September 2014 to participate in the 2014–15 UEFA Champions League group stage match against Chelsea, where he didn't come on to play.

==== Loan at Sturm Graz ====
On 13 January 2015, in the winter transfer window, Avdijaj went on an 18-month loan deal at Austrian side Sturm Graz. He made his debut for Sturm Graz in a friendly match against Kalsdorf and scored a goal.

===== 2014–15 season =====
On 21 February 2015. He made his professional debut in a 3–3 home draw against Wiener Neustadt. He came in as a substitute in the 81st minute in place of Bright Edomwonyi and just 2 minutes later, Avdijaj made an assist for the temporary advantage goal 3–2 scored by Martin Ehrenreich. In his second ever match for the senior squad, Avdijaj played only as a substitute against Rapid Wien, coming on in the 73rd minute in place of Daniel Offenbacher for the 1–0 loss. Then in his third match, Avdijaj played for the first time in the starting line up against Austria Wien on 3 March 2015 where he substituted off in the 64th minute for exactly his rival Bright Edomwonyi, whose place Avdijaj had previously taken in his debut. He scored his first goal for Sturm Graz in his 7th match on 21 March 2015 against Admira, playing as a starter and scoring the opening goal in the 28th minute in the 3–1 victory. After the 26th game week Avdijaj established himself in the starting line up playing as a side midfielder mostly on the left side, attacking midfielder and also as a second striker.

He ended the season with total of 17 appearances, 12 as a starter including 8 full 90-minute matches where he managed to score in total 6 goals and provided 3 assists. Sturm Graz finished 4th in the league table to secure a place in the UEFA Champions League third qualifying round.

===== 2015–16 season =====
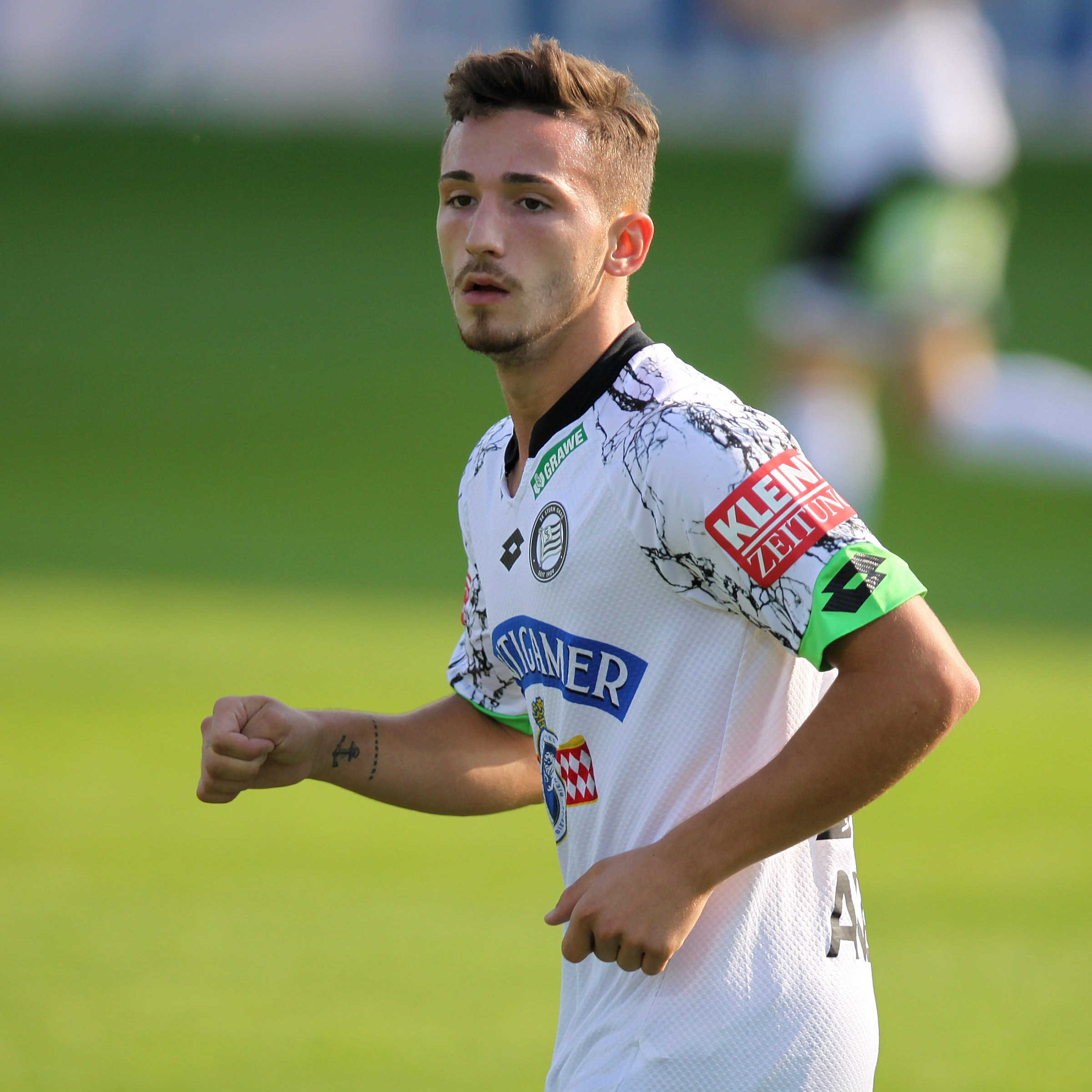
Avdijaj with Sturm Graz in 2015

On 18 July 2015, Avdijaj started the 2015–16 with an impressive performance against Hartberg in the 2015–16 Austrian Cup first round by scoring one goal, providing one assist and winning a penalty to help his side to take an away 0–6 victory.

==== Loan at Roda JC ====
On 15 January 2018. Avdijaj joined Eredivisie side Roda JC, on a 5-month loan. On 20 January 2018, he made his debut in a 1–1 home draw against Twente after being named in the starting line-up.

=== Willem II ===
On 16 August 2018. Avdijaj joined Eredivisie side Willem II, on a year-long contract with the option of a second year. On 17 August 2018, he made his debut in a 0–1 away minimal win against Groningen after coming on as a substitute at 64th minute in place of James McGarry. On 18 March 2019, after having failed to get fit and not playing for the club for multiple months along with off the pitch issues, Willem II decided to dissolve Avdijaj's contract with immediate effect.

=== Trabzonspor ===
On 8 July 2019, Avdijaj joined Süper Lig side Trabzonspor after agreeing to a one-year deal with the option of continuation for three years. On 8 August 2019, he made his debut with Trabzonspor in the third round of 2019–20 UEFA Europa League against the Czech side Sparta Prague after coming on as a substitute at 76th minute in place of Abdülkadir Ömür. On 17 January 2020, his contract was terminated by mutual consent.

=== Heart of Midlothian ===
On 20 January 2020, Avdijaj joined Scottish Premiership side Heart of Midlothian, on a six-month contract. After signing for Hearts, Avdijaj said "There is no country, no city in the world where I don't score [a goal]. I score everywhere." Two days later, he made his debut for Hearts in a goalless draw against Ross County. He left Hearts with 3 games played and no goals scored.

=== FC Emmen ===
On 12 November 2020, Avdijaj joined Eredivisie club Emmen on a contract until the end of the season, with an option for a further year. He had been training with the team since October and impressed during his trial period. Club chairman Ronald Lubbers noted that Avdijaj could provide "something extra" in attack, primarily as a left winger, but also capable of playing across the forward line.

Avdijaj made his debut for the club on 22 November, coming on as a substitute for Anco Jansen in the 63rd minute of a 1–0 league defeat to AZ. Over the course of his tenure, he made eight league appearances and participated in two KNVB Cup matches, without registering a goal.

In January 2021, following the arrivals of strikers Luka Adžić and Kerim Frei, Avdijaj found his playing opportunities limited. Expressing concerns about his role, he sought a transfer. Chairman Lubbers commented that Avdijaj was "not the most patient player," and the club allowed him to explore other options.

=== AEL Limassol ===
On 31 January 2021, Avdijaj joined Cypriot club AEL Limassol. His contract with the club was terminated in August 2021.

=== TSV Hartberg ===
On 29 August 2021, Avdijaj joined Austrian Bundesliga side TSV Hartberg, signing a two-year contract. He made his competitive debut for the club on 11 September, featuring in the starting line-up of a 3–1 away victory in the league against Wolfsberger AC. His first goal came on 26 September in a 4–3 home loss to Austria Wien off a cross from Nemanja Belaković. In October 2021, he was sidelined with an ankle injury for some time, sidelining him for a month. He finished the season with 21 appearances in which he scored five goals, in a season where Hartberg, alongside Rheindorf Altach and SV Ried, barely avoided relegation by one point.

Avdijaj started the 2022–23 season strong, scoring a brace in the home opener against Rheindorf Altach coached by Miroslav Klose.

=== Zürich ===
Avdijaj joined Swiss Super League club FC Zürich on 1 August 2022 on a three-year contract. The team had been struggling prior to his arrival, with the defending league winner having scored zero goals in the first matches of the season and finding themselves bottom of the league.

On 4 August, Avdijaj made his competitive debut for the club, coming on as a substitute in the 72nd minute for Antonio Marchesano in a 2–0 away win over Linfield in the UEFA Europa League qualifiers. He then made his league debut three days later, playing the entire match as his club lost 3–0 to FC Sion in the league. He would score his first goals for Zürich in the return leg against Linfield on 11 August, bagging a brace as he catapulted his side to a 3–0 victory. The win meant that Avdijaj and Zürich were set to face his former side Hearts in the next qualifying round of the tournament.

==== Return to TSV Hartberg ====
On 25 January 2023, Avdijaj returned to TSV Hartberg on loan until the end of the 2022–23 season.

=== Second return to TSV Hartberg ===
Avdijaj began the 2023–24 season at Zürich and played in the first two game of the Swiss league season, however, on 30 August 2023 he returned to TSV Hartberg on a permanent basis and signed a two-season contract.

=== Wolfsberger AC ===
On 30 June 2025, Avdijaj signed with Austrian Bundesliga club Wolfsberger AC on a two-year contract.

== International career ==
On 11 October 2014, Avdijaj announced to have refused the Germany U19 as his intention was to represent Albania, where he said: "It's better to have behind my own people, rather than foreigners" and he needed just an Albanian citizenship for him to be part of the national team managed by Gianni De Biasi. In November 2014, the coach Gianni De Biasi declared that he spoke with his father and the Schalke 04 coach Roberto Di Matteo for the situation of Avdijaj if he would play for the first team as a professional, a condition of De Biasi to invite him in the national team. In December 2014. Donis' father confirmed the family's desire that the footballer represents Albania in the future. In March 2015. Avdijaj told Albanian media that he has personally met with De Biasi and is looking forward to a call-up.

=== Kosovo ===
On 10 November 2016, two days before a match with Turkey, he joined with the Kosovo in Antalya, but in the match with Turkey, could not play because that was not allowed by FIFA. On 20 March 2017, he received the call-up from Kosovo in a match against Iceland. On 24 March 2017, FIFA accepted Avdijaj's request to play for Kosovo and on the same day he made his debut in a match of the 2018 FIFA World Cup qualifiers against Iceland.

== Personal life ==
Avdijaj was born in Osnabrück, Germany from Kosovo Albanian parents from Istog (Kosovo), he attended the Gesamtschule Berger Feld until 2012–13.

== Career statistics ==
=== Club ===
As of match played 17 August 2025

Appearances and goals by club, season and competition
| Club | Season | League | | | Cup (Note: Includes Austrian Cup, KNVB Cup, Turkish Cup, Cypriot Cup, Swiss Cup) | | Europe (Note: Includes UEFA Europa League) | | Other (Note: Includes Eredivisie relegation play-offs, Austrian Bundesliga Conference League play-offs) | | Total | |
| Club | Season | Division | Apps | Goals | Apps | Goals | Apps | Goals | Apps | Goals | Apps | Goals |
|---|---|---|---|---|---|---|---|---|---|---|---|---|
| Schalke 04 II | 2014–15 | Regionalliga West | 11 | 4 | — | | — | | — | | 11 | 4 |
| Sturm Graz (loan) | 2014–15 | Austrian Bundesliga | 17 | 6 | 0 | 0 | — | | — | | 17 | 6 |
| Sturm Graz (loan) | 2015–16 | Austrian Bundesliga | 25 | 3 | 2 | 3 | 1 | 1 | — | | 28 | 7 |
| Sturm Graz (loan) | Total | | 42 | 9 | 2 | 3 | 1 | 1 | — | | 45 | 13 |
| Schalke 04 | 2016–17 | Bundesliga | 9 | 2 | 0 | 0 | 3 | 0 | — | | 12 | 2 |
| Schalke 04 | 2017–18 | Bundesliga | 0 | 0 | 0 | 0 | — | | — | | 0 | 0 |
| Schalke 04 | Total | | 9 | 2 | 0 | 0 | 3 | 0 | — | | 12 | 2 |
| Roda JC (loan) | 2017–18 | Eredivisie | 11 | 3 | 1 | 1 | — | | 2 | 0 | 14 | 4 |
| Willem II | 2018–19 | Eredivisie | 15 | 4 | 3 | 4 | — | | — | | 18 | 8 |
| Trabzonspor | 2019–20 | Süper Lig | 8 | 1 | 2 | 0 | 8 | 0 | — | | 18 | 1 |
| Heart of Midlothian | 2019–20 | Scottish Premiership | 3 | 0 | 0 | 0 | — | | — | | 3 | 0 |
| FC Emmen | 2020–21 | Eredivisie | 8 | 0 | 2 | 0 | — | | — | | 10 | 0 |
| AEL Limassol | 2020–21 | Cypriot First Division | 9 | 0 | 3 | 0 | — | | — | | 12 | 0 |
| TSV Hartberg | 2021–22 | Austrian Bundesliga | 18 | 5 | 3 | 0 | — | | — | | 21 | 5 |
| TSV Hartberg | 2022–23 | Austrian Bundesliga | 1 | 2 | 1 | 0 | — | | — | | 2 | 2 |
| TSV Hartberg | Total | | 19 | 7 | 4 | 0 | — | | — | | 23 | 7 |
| Zürich | 2022–23 | Swiss Super League | 7 | 0 | 1 | 0 | 8 | 3 | — | | 16 | 3 |
| Zürich | 2023–24 | Swiss Super League | 2 | 0 | 1 | 0 | — | | — | | 3 | 0 |
| Zürich | Total | | 9 | 0 | 2 | 0 | 8 | 3 | — | | 19 | 3 |
| TSV Hartberg (loan) | 2022–23 | Austrian Bundesliga | 15 | 5 | — | | — | | — | | 15 | 5 |
| TSV Hartberg | 2023–24 | Austrian Bundesliga | 25 | 12 | 2 | 0 | — | | 2 | 0 | 29 | 12 |
| TSV Hartberg | 2024–25 | Austrian Bundesliga | 29 | 4 | 6 | 7 | — | | 1 | 0 | 36 | 11 |
| TSV Hartberg | Total | | 69 | 21 | 8 | 7 | — | | 3 | 0 | 80 | 28 |
| Wolfsberger AC | 2025–26 | Austrian Bundesliga | 3 | 0 | 1 | 2 | 2 | 0 | — | | 6 | 2 |
| Career total | | | 216 | 51 | 28 | 17 | 22 | 4 | 5 | 0 | 271 | 72 |

=== International ===
As of 17 November 2018

| National team | Year | Apps | Goals |
|---|---|---|---|
Kosovo
| Kosovo | 2017 | 2 | 0 |
| Kosovo | 2018 | 4 | 2 |
| Total | | 6 | 2 |

==== International goals ====
As of 17 November 2018
Scores and results list Kosovo's goal tally first.

| No. | Date | Venue | Opponent | Score | Result | Competition | Ref. |
|---|---|---|---|---|---|---|---|
| 1. | 17 November 2018 | National Stadium, Ta' Qali, Malta | Malta | 3–0 | 5–0 | 2018–19 UEFA Nations League | |
| 2. | 17 November 2018 | National Stadium, Ta' Qali, Malta | Malta | 4–0 | 5–0 | 2018–19 UEFA Nations League | |

== Honours ==
Trabzonspor

- Turkish Cup: 2019–20

Individual

- Fritz Walter Medal U17 Bronze: 2013
