= Florian Faist =

Austrian football player

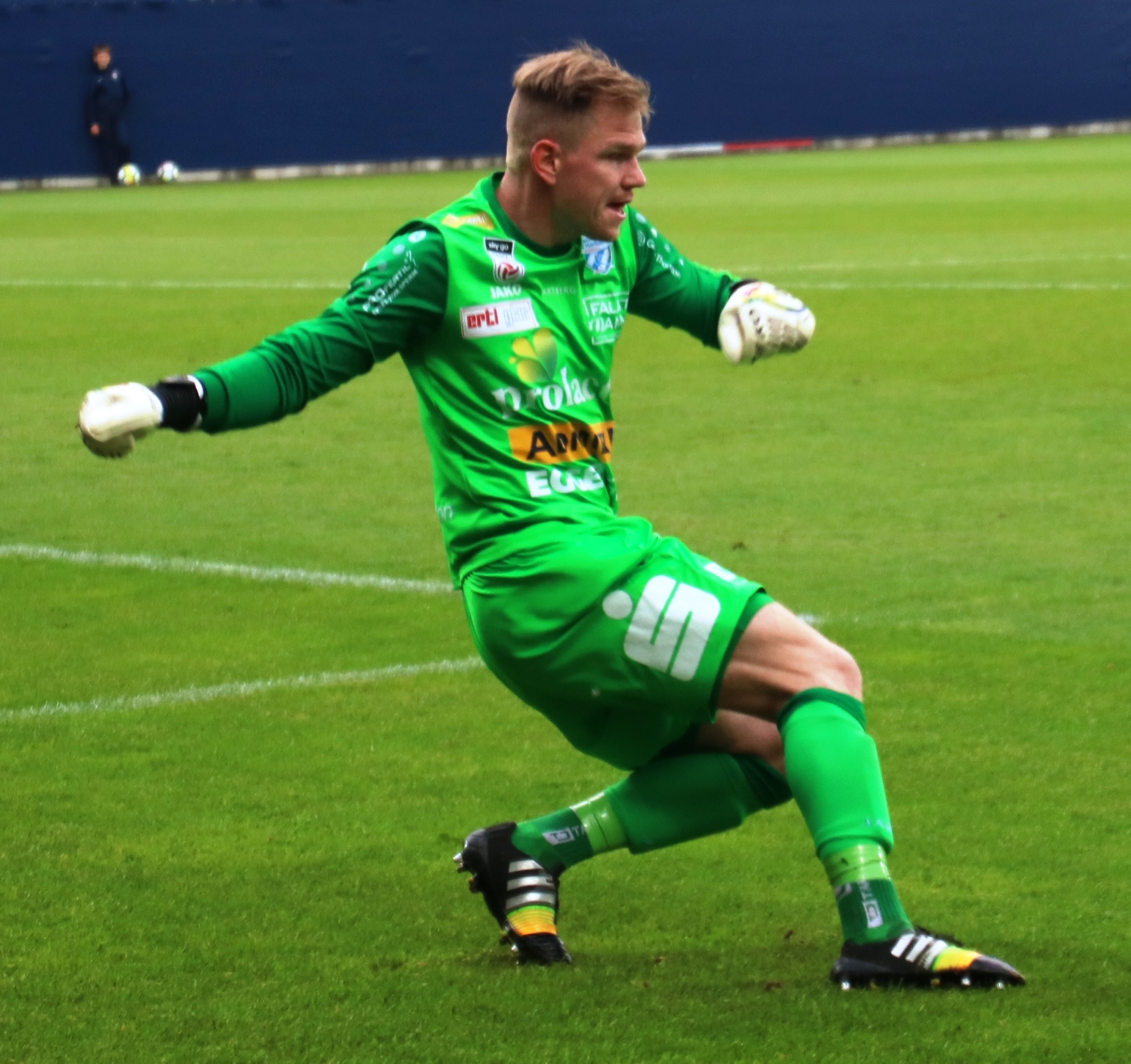

Personal information
- Date of birth: 10 April 1989 (age 37)
- Place of birth: Hartberg, Austria
- Height: 1.84 m (6 ft 0 in)
- Position: Goalkeeper

Team information
- Current team: TSV Hartberg II
- Number: 1

Youth career
- 1996–2005: USV Hartberg Umgebung

Senior career*
Years	Team	Apps	(Gls)
2005–2008	USV Hartberg Umgebung		
2008–2011	TuS Greinbach		
2012	SV Anger	26	(0)
2012	TSV Pöllau		
2013	USV Hartberg Umgebung		
2013–2014	SV Anger		
2014–2023	TSV Hartberg	44	(0)
2023–	TSV Hartberg II	2	(0)
- * Club domestic league appearances and goals as of 10 November 2023

Florian Faist (born 10 April 1989) is an Austrian professional footballer who plays as a goalkeeper for fourth-tier Landesliga Steiermark club TSV Hartberg II.

== Club career ==
He made his Austrian Football First League debut for TSV Hartberg on 22 August 2014 in a game against Kapfenberger SV.
