= Patrick Plojer =

Austrian footballer

Personal information
- Date of birth: 26 March 2001 (age 25)
- Place of birth: Wels, Austria
- Height: 1.82 m (6 ft 0 in)
- Position: Winger

Team information
- Current team: SPG HOGO Wels
- Number: 26

Youth career
- 2008–2010: SC Offenhausen
- 2010–2015: Blau-Weiß Stadl-Paura
- 2015–2019: AKA Linz

Senior career*
Years	Team	Apps	(Gls)
2019–2023	Juniors OÖ	69	(16)
2020–2021	LASK	7	(0)
2021–2022	→ Blau-Weiß Linz (loan)	14	(0)
2023–	SPG HOGO Wels	14	(1)

International career
2018	Austria U18	1	(0)
2020	Austria U19	1	(0)
- * Club domestic league appearances and goals as of 20:49, 3 March 2024 (UTC)

Patrick Plojer (born 26 March 2001) is an Austrian footballer who plays as a winger for SPG HOGO Wels.

== Club career ==
He made his Austrian Football First League debut for Juniors OÖ on 24 May 2019 in an away game against Kapfenberger SV.

On 26 August 2021, he joined Blau-Weiß Linz on a season-long loan.

== International career ==
Plojer has already earned caps for the Austrian U18 and U19 teams. In March 2021, he was nominated on call for the newly formed Austrian U21 team.
