= Bojan Lugonja =

Austrian footballer

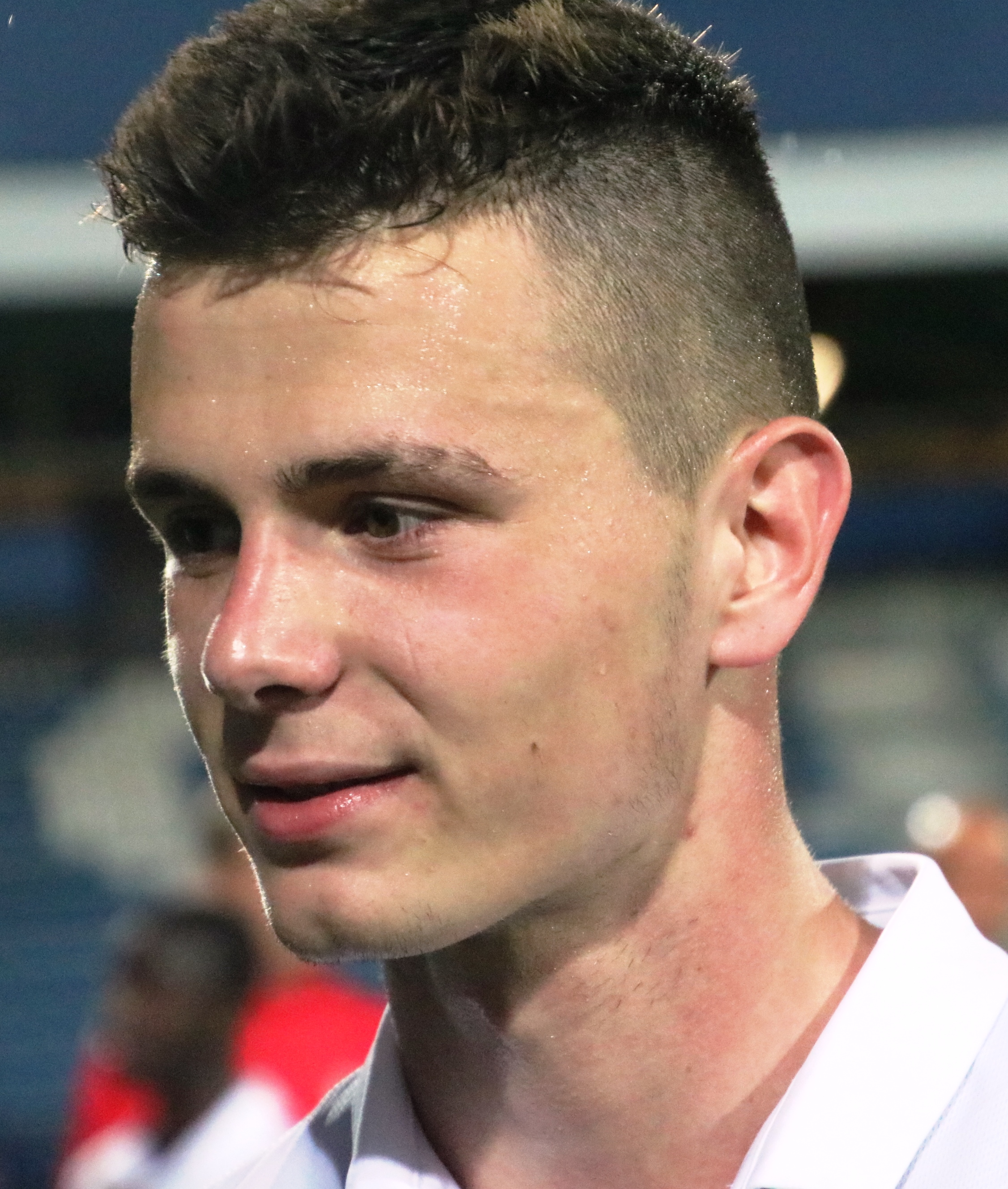
- Lugonja with Liefering in 2017

Personal information
- Date of birth: 1 August 1998 (age 28)
- Place of birth: Bosnia and Herzegovina
- Height: 1.84 m (6 ft 1/2 in)
- Position: Centre back

Youth career
- 2004–2011: WSC Hertha Wels
- 2011–2012: Ried
- 2012–2016: LASK Linz

Senior career*
Years	Team	Apps	(Gls)
2016–2017	Pasching	9	(0)
2017–2018	Liefering	25	(1)
2018–2021	Ried	5	(0)
2020–2021	→ Floridsdorfer AC (loan)	19	(1)

International career
2017	Austria U-19	1	(0)
- * Club domestic league appearances and goals as of 17:09, 6 August 2021 (UTC)

Bojan Lugonja (born 1 August 1998) is an Austrian football player.

== Club career ==
He made his Austrian Football First League debut for FC Liefering on 10 March 2017 in a game against FC Wacker Innsbruck.

On 18 August 2020, he joined Floridsdorfer AC on a season-long loan.
