= Michael Steinwender =

Austrian footballer (born 2000)

Personal information
- Date of birth: 4 May 2000 (age 26)
- Place of birth: Eisenstadt, Austria
- Height: 1.90 m (6 ft 3 in)
- Position: Centre-back

Team information
- Current team: VfL Bochum
- Number: 15

Youth career
- 2004–2011: ASK Baumgarten
- 2011–2013: Rapid Wien
- 2013–2014: SV Mattersburg
- 2014–2017: AKA Burgenland

Senior career*
Years	Team	Apps	(Gls)
2017–2020	SV Mattersburg II	64	(5)
2018–2020	SV Mattersburg	4	(0)
2020–2021	SKN St. Pölten	31	(0)
2021–2024	TSV Hartberg	62	(0)
2024–2025	IFK Värnamo	17	(1)
2025–2026	Heart of Midlothian	40	(1)
2026–	VfL Bochum	3	(0)

International career
2017	Austria U18	2	(0)
2018	Austria U19	1	(0)
- * Club domestic league appearances and goals as of 28 August 2026

Michael Steinwender (born 4 May 2000) is an Austrian professional footballer who plays as a centre-back for German 2. Bundesliga club VfL Bochum.

== Club career ==
Steinwender is a product of the youth academies of ASK Baumgarten, Rapid Wien, SV Mattersburg and AKA Burgenland. He began his senior career with the reserves of Mattersburg in 2017. He made his professional debut with Mattersburg in a 2–0 Austrian Football Bundesliga win over SKN St. Pölten on 20 June 2020. On 19 August 2020, he transferred to St. Pölten, signing a three-year contract. On 31 August 2021, he moved to TSV Hartberg, again signing a three-year contract.

On 21 January 2025, Steinwender joined Scottish Premiership club Heart of Midlothian on a three-and-a-half year contract for an undisclosed fee.

On 23 June 2026, Steinwender signed a three-year contract with VfL Bochum in Germany.

== International career ==
Steinwender is a youth international for Austria, having represented the Austria U18s and U19s.

== Career statistics ==
=== Club ===
As of match played 28 August 2026

Appearances and goals by club, season and competition
Club	Season	League			Cup		League Cup		Other		Total	
Club	Season	Division	Apps	Goals	Apps	Goals	Apps	Goals	Apps	Goals	Apps	Goals
Mattersburg II	2017–18	Austrian Regionalliga East	21	2	—		—		—		21	2
Mattersburg II	2018–19	Austrian Regionalliga East	29	1	—		—		—		29	1
Mattersburg II	2019–20	Austrian Regionalliga East	14	2	—		—		—		14	2
Mattersburg II	Total		64	5	—		—		—		64	5
SV Mattersburg	2019–20	Austrian Bundesliga	4	0	—		—		—		4	0
SKN St. Pölten	2020–21	Austrian Bundesliga	27	0	1	0	—		—		28	0
SKN St. Pölten	2021–22	Austrian Bundesliga	4	0	0	0	—		1 (Note: Appearance in relegation play-offs)	0	5	0
SKN St. Pölten	Total		31	0	1	0	—		1	0	33	0
TSV Hartberg	2021–22	Austrian Bundesliga	19	0	4	0	—		—		23	0
TSV Hartberg	2022–23	Austrian Bundesliga	22	0	1	1	—		—		23	1
TSV Hartberg	2023–24	Austrian Bundesliga	21	0	2	0	—		—		23	0
TSV Hartberg	Total		62	0	7	1	—		—		69	1
IFK Värnamo	2024	Allsvenskan	17	1	—		—		2 (Note: Appearances in Allsvenskan play-offs)	0	19	1
Heart of Midlothian	2024–25	Scottish Premiership	9	1	3	0	0	0	—		12	1
Heart of Midlothian	2025–26	Scottish Premiership	31	0	0	0	3	1	1 (Note: Appearance in play-offs)	0	35	1
Heart of Midlothian	Total		40	1	3	0	3	1	1	0	47	2
VfL Bochum	2026–27	2. Bundesliga	3	0	1	0	—		—		4	0
Career total			221	7	12	1	3	1	4	0	240	9
