= Sadam Sulley =

Ghanaian footballer

Personal information
- Date of birth: 16 October 1996 (age 30)
- Place of birth: Accra, Ghana
- Height: 1.92 m (6 ft 4 in)
- Position: Forward

Team information
- Current team: Chungbuk Cheongju
- Number: 35

Youth career
- –2016: Vision Accra

Senior career*
Years	Team	Apps	(Gls)
2016–2019	Legia Warsaw	0	(0)
2016–2017	Legia Warsaw II	15	(1)
2017–2019	→ Zemplín Michalovce (loan)	50	(9)
2019–2020	Senica	18	(2)
2020–2021	SV Ried	4	(0)
2021	Dhofar Club		
2021–2022	FC Prishtina	12	(6)
2022–2024	FC Ryukyu	21	(4)
2024–	Chungbuk Cheongju	2	(0)
- * Club domestic league appearances and goals as of 16 October 2024

Sadam Sulley (born 16 October 1996) is a Ghanaian professional footballer who plays as a forward for Korean club Chungbuk Cheongju.

== Club career ==
Sulley signed for Legia Warsaw in 2016–17 and made his professional Fortuna Liga debut for Zemplín Michalovce against Ružomberok on 19 August 2017. Sulley was featured directly in the starting-XI of the match and was replaced by Vladislav Bragin in the 85th minute.

On 8 October 2020, he signed with Austrian club SV Ried.
