= Mario Sonnleitner =

Austrian footballer

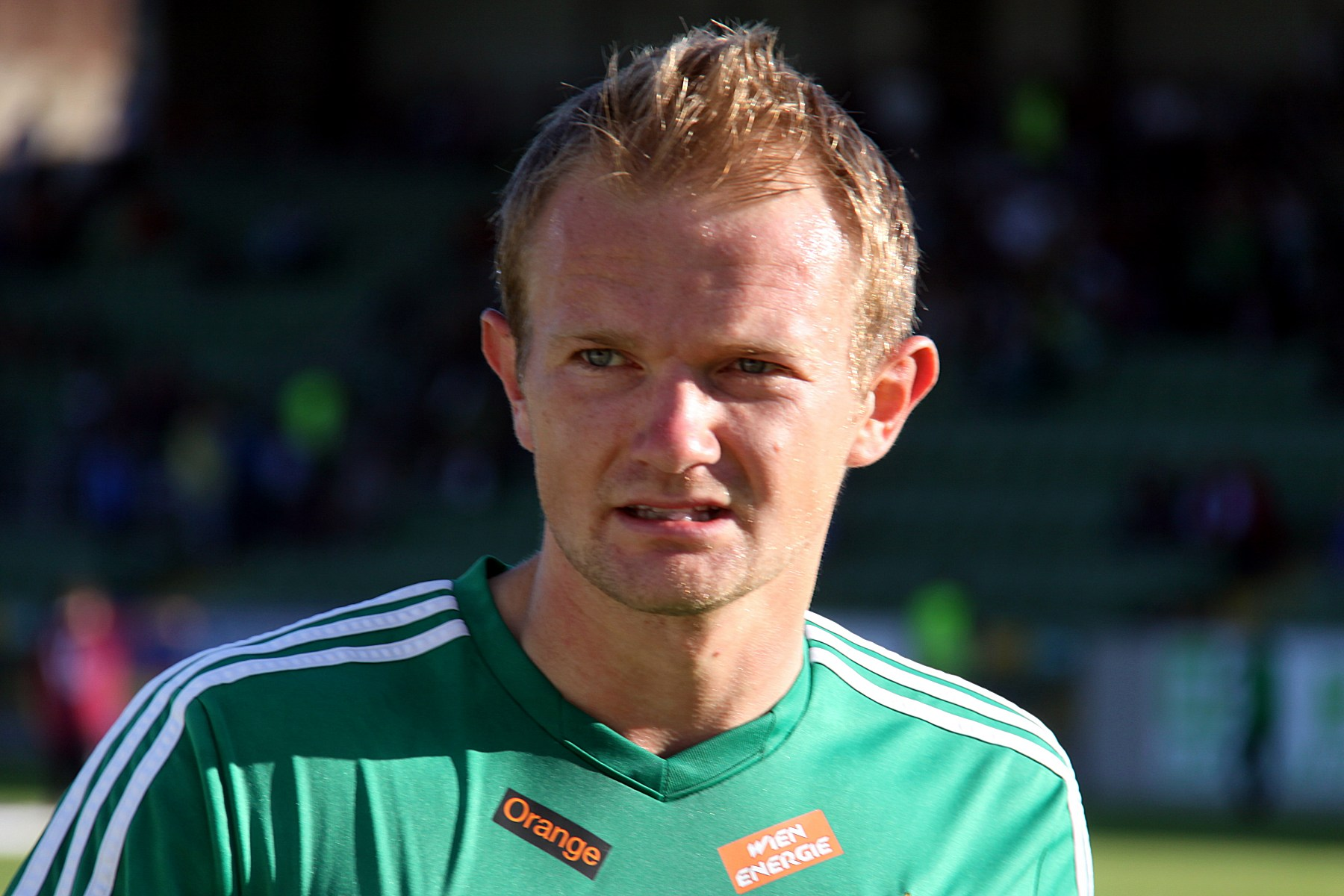

Personal information
- Date of birth: 8 October 1986 (age 40)
- Place of birth: Vorau, Austria
- Height: 1.81 m (5 ft 11 in)
- Position: Defender

Team information
- Current team: Floridsdorfer AC (Head Coach)

Youth career
- 1994–2000: SV Grambach
- 2000–2003: Grazer AK

Senior career*
| Years | Team | Apps | (Gls) |
| 2003–2004 | Grazer AK | 0 | (0) |
| 2004–2005 | Kapfenberger SV | 36 | (0) |
| 2005–2007 | Grazer AK | 46 | (1) |
| 2007–2010 | Sturm Graz | 83 | (2) |
| 2010–2021 | Rapid Wien | 265 | (22) |
| 2021–2023 | TSV Hartberg | 42 | (1) |

International career
| 2006–2008 | Austria U21 | 17 | (0) |

Managerial career
- 2026-: Floridsdorfer AC
- * Club domestic league appearances and goals

Mario Sonnleitner (born 8 October 1986) is an Austrian former professional footballer who currently serves as head coach of 2. Liga (Austria) club Floridsdorfer AC.

== Career ==
=== Grazer AK ===
A native of Vorau, Sonnleitner began playing club football with Grazer AK, signing his first professional contract on 1 July 2004 and stayed there for 3 years, before moving up the road to Sturm Graz on the 21 June 2007.

=== Sturm Graz ===
Signed on a free transfer, Sonnleitner joined Sturm Graz in 2010 and captained the side until moving to Rapid Wien.

== International career ==
Sonnleitner represented Austria at U21 level.

== Honours ==
Sturm Graz

- Austrian Cup: 2009–10
