= Hartberg =

- Municipality
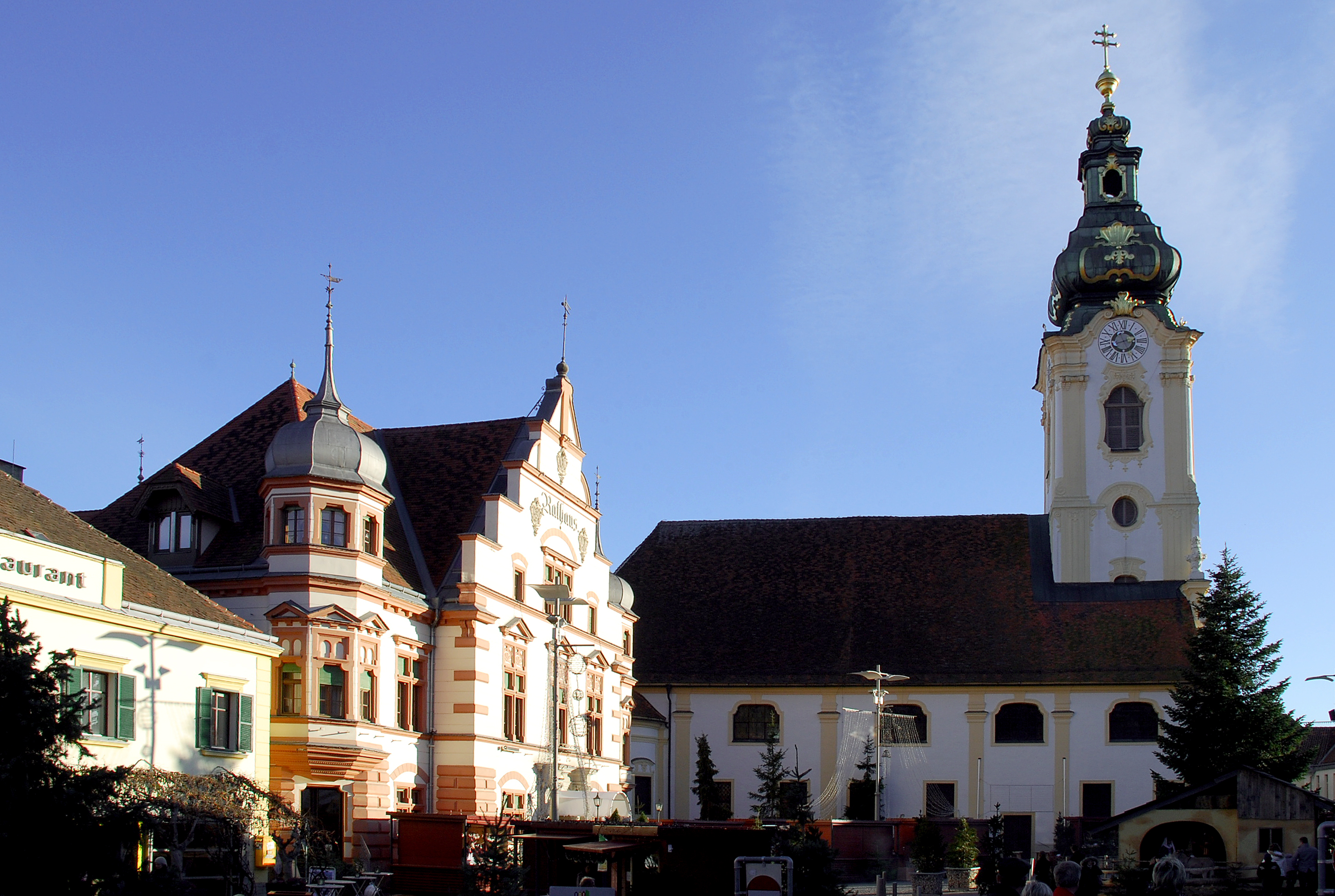
- Town hall and the Church of Saint Martin

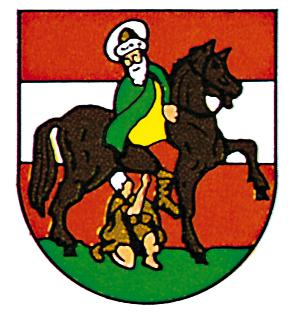
- Coat of arms

- Location within Austria Location within Styria
- Coordinates: 47°16′50″N 15°58′12″E
- Country: Austria
- State: Styria
- District: Hartberg-Fürstenfeld

Government
  - Mayor: Marcus Martschitsch (ÖVP)

Area
  - Total: 21.53 km^{2} (8.31 sq mi)
- Elevation: 359 m (1,178 ft)

Population (2018-01-01)
  - Total: 6,650
  - Density: 309/km^{2} (800/sq mi)
- Time zone: UTC+1 (CET)
  - Summer (DST): UTC+2 (CEST)
- Postal code: 8230
- Area code: +43 3332
- Vehicle registration: HF
- Website: www.hartberg.at

Hartberg (Austrian German: [ˈhartbɛrɡ]) is a city in Styria, Austria and the district seat of Hartberg-Fürstenfeld District. As of January 1st 2024, it has a population of 6,713 in an area of 21.58 km^{2}. About 68 km up the A2 Autobahn is the large Styrian capital of Graz.

This town has a long and rich history. A settlement was located here in the Neolithic ages. One of the most important, prehistoric settlements of Styria developed on "Ringkogel" in the 3rd century BC. A massive protective wall surrounded it. Only two towers remain of the 7-8 metre high and 1500 metre long wall. (Schölbinger Tower and Reck Tower). In 1122 margrave Leopold I of Styria founded "Hartberg". The first mention of Hartberg as a city was in a 1286 document. During the 15th century it was conquered by King Matthias Corvinus of Hungary. A huge fire destroyed the town up to a few houses, but the population has been continually on the rise since then.
