= Nemanja Belaković =

Serbian footballer (born 1997)

Personal information
- Date of birth: 8 January 1997 (age 29)
- Place of birth: Kraljevo, FR Yugoslavia
- Height: 1.82 m (6 ft 0 in)
- Position: Winger

Team information
- Current team: Petrovac
- Number: 11

Youth career
- 2007–2009: Bambi Kraljevo
- 2009–2011: Sloga Kraljevo
- 2011–2014: Partizan
- 2012–2013: → Teleoptik
- 2014–2016: OFK Beograd

Senior career*
Years	Team	Apps	(Gls)
2014–2016	OFK Beograd	14	(0)
2016–2017	Novigrad	44	(3)
2018–2019	Čukarički	18	(1)
2019–2021	Spartaks Jūrmala	54	(26)
2021	TSV Hartberg	7	(1)
2022	Liepāja	36	(8)
2023–2025	Radnički Niš	84	(6)
2026–	Petrovac	17	(0)
- * Club domestic league appearances and goals as of 15 June 2026

Nemanja Belaković (Serbian Cyrillic: Немања Белаковић; born 8 January 1997) is a Serbian footballer who plays as a winger for Petrovac in the Montenegrin First League.

== Club career ==
Born in Kraljevo, Belaković started football training in "Bambi" football academy, and later joined local club Sloga. From 2013 to 2014 he spent in Partizan youth team, and after the 2013-14 season joined OFK Beograd. He made his professional debut for OFK Beograd in an away Serbian SuperLiga match against Red Star Belgrade on 29 November 2014. After a season-and-a-half with the Croatian Second Football League side NK Novigrad, Belaković moved to Čukarički at the beginning of 2018.

On 19 July 2021, he joined TSV Hartberg in Austria on a two-year contract.
