= Philipp Sturm =

Austrian footballer

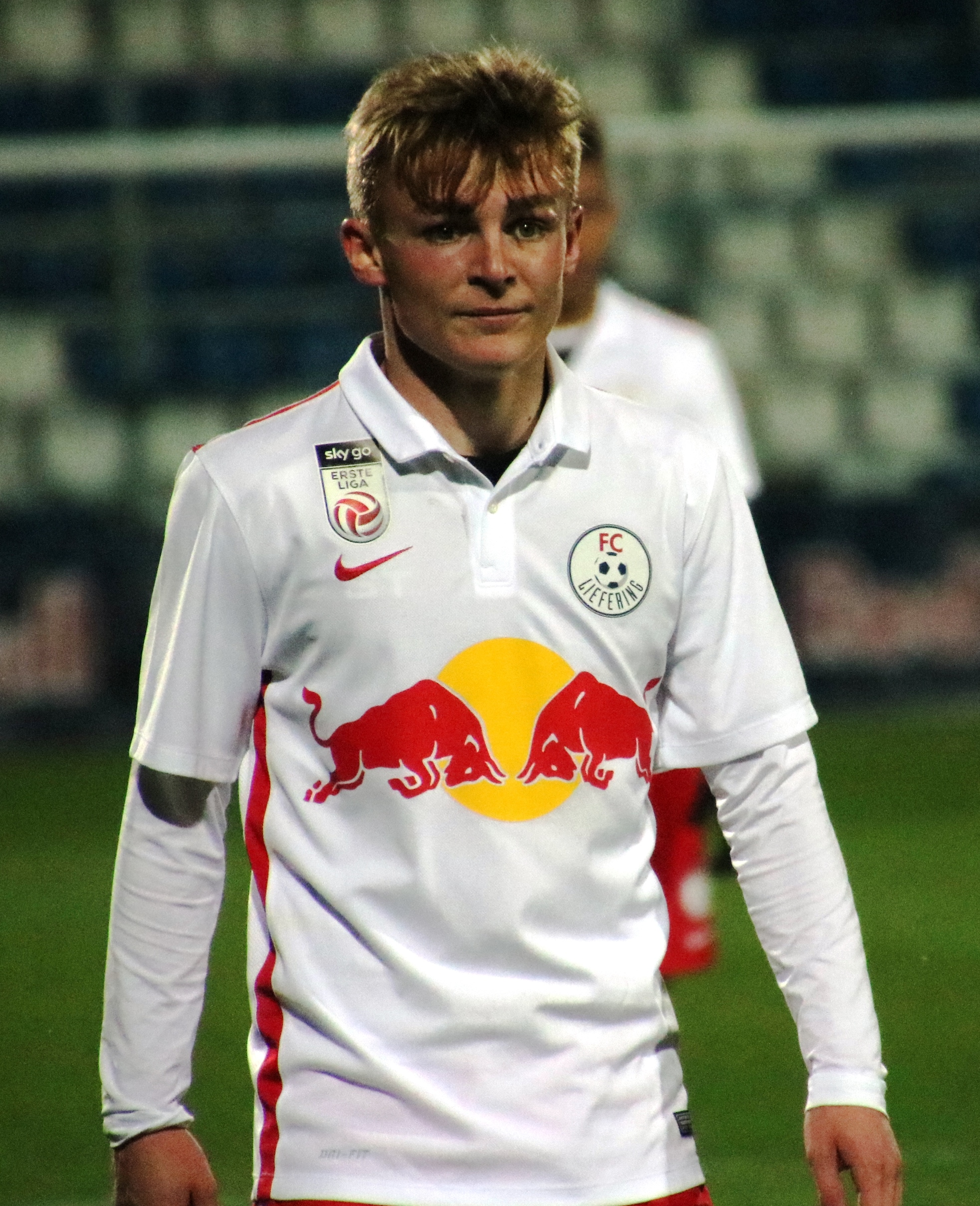
- Sturm in 2017

Personal information
- Date of birth: 23 February 1999 (age 27)
- Place of birth: Salzburg, Austria
- Height: 1.76 m (5 ft 9 in)
- Position: Midfielder

Team information
- Current team: UFC Siezenheim

Youth career
- SV Wals-Grünau
- 2009–2017: Red Bull Salzburg

Senior career*
Years	Team	Apps	(Gls)
2017–2019	FC Liefering	32	(3)
2019–2020	Chemnitzer FC	13	(0)
2020–2023	TSV Hartberg	24	(2)
2023–	UFC Siezenheim	13	(3)

International career^{‡}
2015	Austria U16	3	(0)
2016	Austria U18	5	(0)
2017	Austria U19	5	(1)
- * Club domestic league appearances and goals as of 5 November 2023 ‡ National team caps and goals as of 12 July 2018

Philipp Sturm (born 23 February 1999) is an Austrian footballer who plays as a midfielder for UFC Siezenheim in the fourth-tier Salzburger Liga.

== Club career ==
=== FC Liefering ===
Philipp Sturm started his career with the youth team of SV Wals-Grünau. 2009 he came to the youth of FC Red Bull Salzburg and then to Salzburgs football academy, where he played for all teams (U15, U16, U18).

2017 he signed with FC Liefering. He was also member of the FC Red Bull Salzburg U19 team which won the UEFA Youth League 2016/17 and the team 2017/18.

He made his professional debut playing for Red Bull Salzburg's feeder team, Liefering, against Kapfenberger SV on 21 July 2017.

=== Chemnitzer FC ===
On 30 June 2019, Sturm joined Chemnitzer FC on a free transfer.
