= Thomas Kofler =

Austrian association footballer

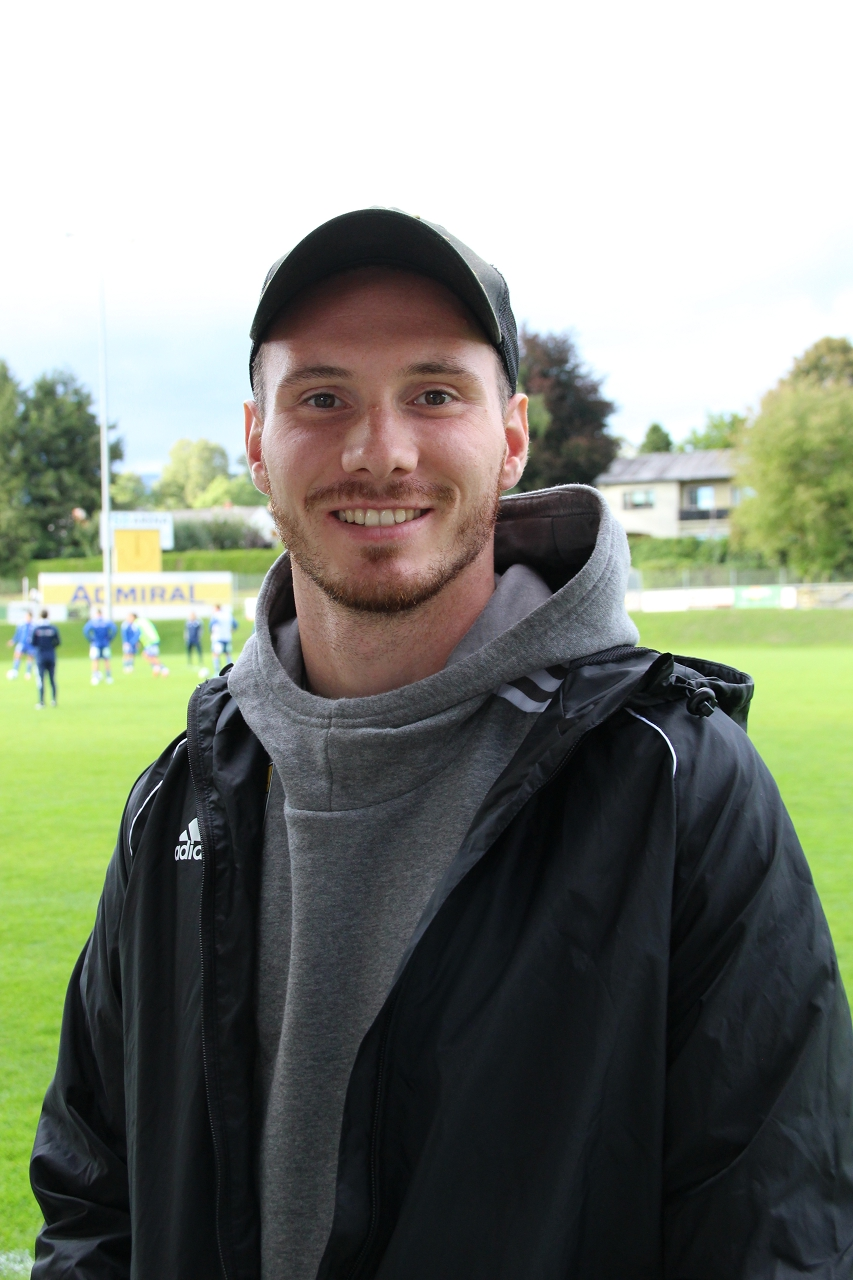
- Kofler in 2021

Personal information
- Date of birth: 7 July 1998 (age 28)
- Place of birth: Austria
- Height: 1.77 m (5 ft 10 in)
- Position: Left-back

Team information
- Current team: SC Imst

Youth career
- 2004–2012: Innsbrucker
- 2012–2016: AKA Tirol

Senior career*
Years	Team	Apps	(Gls)
2016–2019	Wacker Innsbruck II	47	(1)
2019–2021	FC Wacker Innsbruck	48	(1)
2021–2023	Hartberg	20	(0)
2023–	SC Imst	90	(10)
- * Club domestic league appearances and goals as of 26 June 2026

Thomas Kofler (born 7 July 1998) is an Austrian professional footballer who plays as a left-back for Regionalliga Tirol club SC Imst.

== Career ==
Kofler is a product of the youth academies of Innsbrucker and AKA Tirol. In 2016, he began his senior career with Wacker Innsbruck II, and in 2019 was promoted to their senior team FC Wacker Innsbruck. He made his professional debut with Wacker Innsbruck II in a 1–0 2. Liga loss to SV Ried on 5 October 2018. On 13 July 2021, he transferred to Hartberg in the Austrian Football Bundesliga, signing a 3-year contract.

On 15 January 2023, Kofler moved to SC Imst in the third-tier Regionalliga Tirol.
