= Stefan Gölles =

Austrian footballer

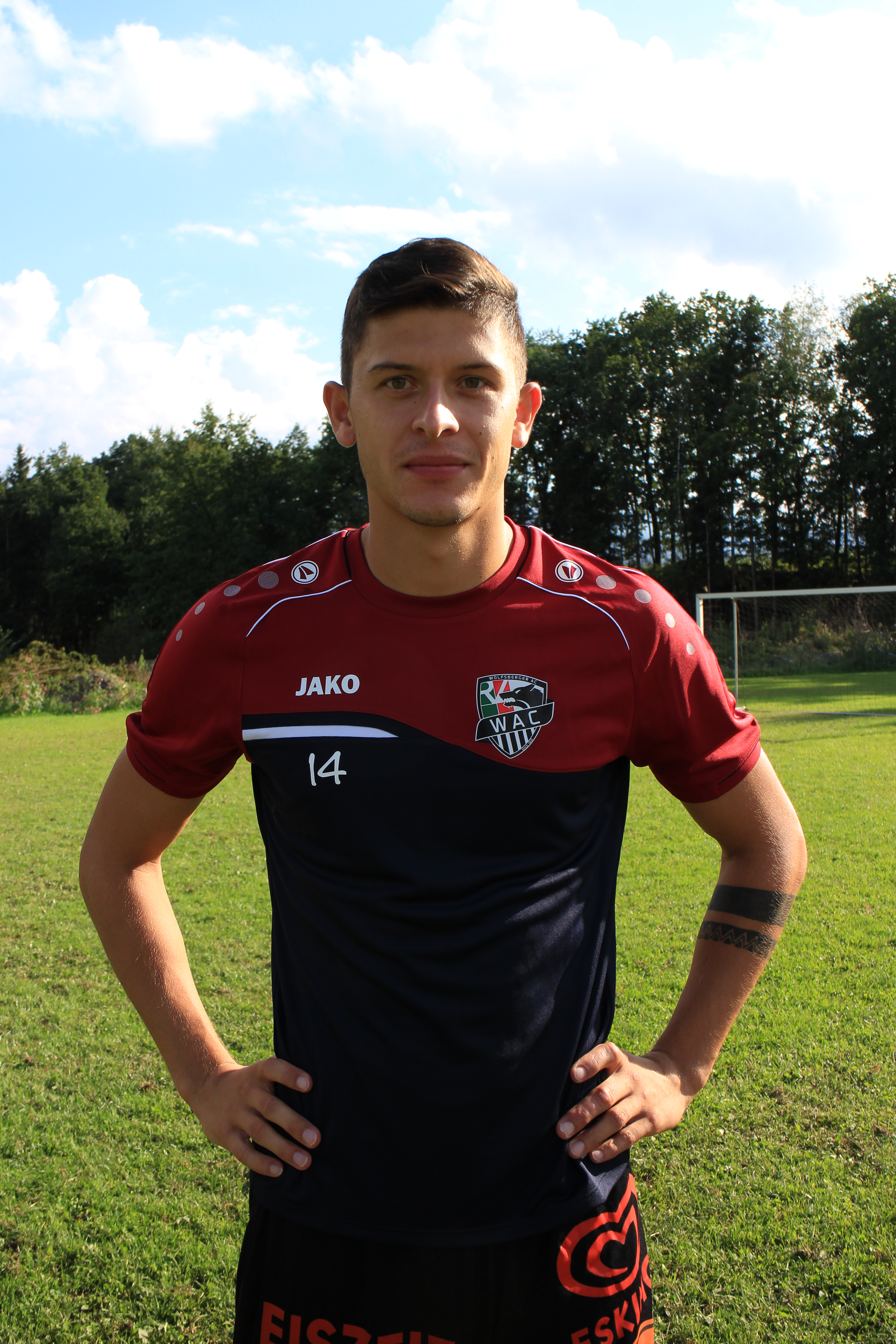

Personal information
- Date of birth: 4 October 1991 (age 35)
- Height: 1.88 m (6 ft 2 in)
- Position: Right-back

Team information
- Current team: SV Lafnitz
- Number: 29

Youth career
- 1998–2006: SV Pischelsdorf

Senior career*
Years	Team	Apps	(Gls)
2007–2014	SV Pischelsdorf		
2014–2016	SC Weiz	53	(3)
2016–2017	TSV Hartberg	49	(6)
2018–2020	Wolfsberger AC	16	(1)
2020–2022	TSV Hartberg	11	(0)
2021–2022	→ SV Lafnitz (loan)	25	(6)
2022–	SV Lafnitz	22	(4)
- * Club domestic league appearances and goals as of 20 June 2023

Stefan Gölles (born 4 October 1991) is an Austrian professional footballer who plays as a right-back for SV Lafnitz.

== Club career ==
He made his Austrian Football First League debut for TSV Hartberg on 21 July 2017 in a game against WSG Wattens.
