= Seth Paintsil =

Ghanaian footballer

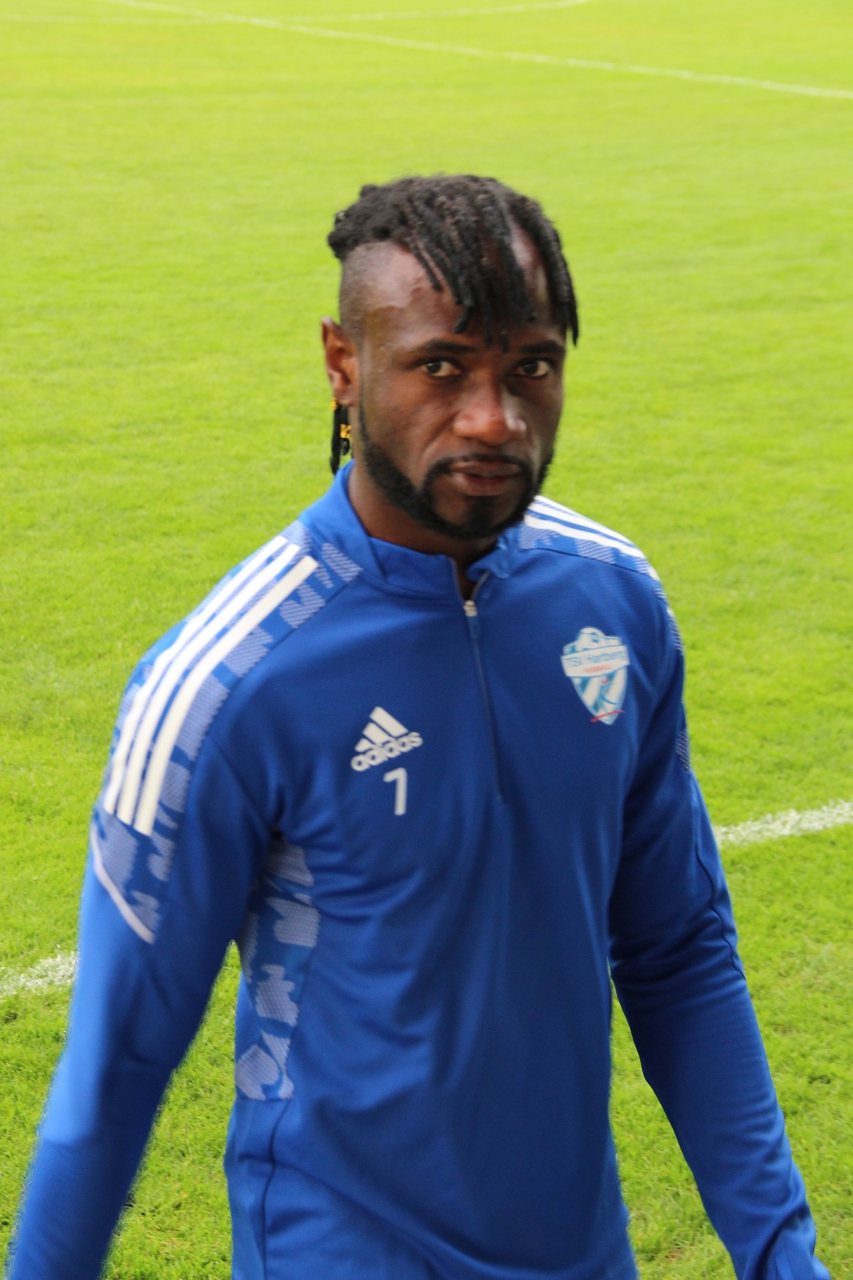
- Paintsil in 2021

Personal information
- Date of birth: 20 May 1996 (age 30)
- Place of birth: Ghana
- Height: 1.67 m (5 ft 6 in)
- Position: Winger

Team information
- Current team: SC Retz

Youth career
- –2013: Red Bull Ghana
- 2013–2015: BA Stars

Senior career*
Years	Team	Apps	(Gls)
2015–2018	FF Jaro	67	(15)
2015–2017	→ Jakobstads BK	7	(5)
2018–2020	Admira Wacker	33	(2)
2020–2021	SV Ried	11	(1)
2021–2023	TSV Hartberg	34	(4)
2023–2024	Ħamrun Spartans	23	(7)
2024	Birkirkara	3	(0)
2026–	SC Retz	16	(1)
- * Club domestic league appearances and goals as of 6 March 2025

Seth Paintsil (born 20 May 1996) is a Ghanaian professional footballer who plays for Austrian Regionalliga East club SC Retz.

== Career ==
On 17 August 2020, Paintsil joined SV Ried.

On 21 July 2021, he signed a two-year contract with TSV Hartberg.

== Personal life ==
His Younger brother Joseph is also a footballer, who plays for American club LA Galaxy and the Ghana national team.

== Career statistics ==
As of 11 June 2024

Appearances and goals by club, season and competition
Club	Season	League			National cup (Note: Includes Suomen Cup, Austrian Cup, Maltese FA Trophy)		Continental		Other		Total	
Club	Season	Division	Apps	Goals	Apps	Goals	Apps	Goals	Apps	Goals	Apps	Goals
Brong Ahafo United	2015	Ghana Premier League	1	0	–		–		–		1	0
Jaro	2015	Veikkausliiga	18	0	0	0	–		0	0	18	0
Jaro	2016	Ykkönen	9	0	1	0	–		–		10	0
Jaro	2017	Ykkönen	25	10	1	0	–		–		26	10
Jaro	2018	Ykkönen	15	5	4	3	–		–		19	8
Jaro	Total		67	15	6	3	0	0	0	0	73	18
JBK	2015	Kakkonen	6	5	–		–		–		6	5
JBK	2017	Kakkonen	1	0	–		–		–		1	0
JBK	Total		7	5	0	0	0	0	0	0	7	5
Admira Wacker II	2018–19	Austrian Regionalliga East	1	2	–		–		–		1	2
Admira Wacker	2018–19	Austrian Bundesliga	11	2	0	0	–		–		11	2
Admira Wacker	2019–20	Austrian Bundesliga	22	0	2	1	–		–		24	1
Admira Wacker	Total		33	2	2	1	0	0	0	0	35	3
SV Ried	2020–21	Austrian Bundesliga	11	1	–		–		–		11	1
TSV Hartberg	2021–22	Austrian Bundesliga	20	4	1	0	–		–		21	4
TSV Hartberg	2022–23	Austrian Bundesliga	11	0	2	0	–		–		13	0
TSV Hartberg	Total		31	4	3	0	0	0	0	0	34	4
Ħamrun Spartans	2023–24	Maltese Premier League	23	7	3	0	5 (Note: Includes UEFA Champions League and UEFA Europa Conference League)	0	0	0	31	7
Career total			174	36	14	4	5	0	0	0	193	40
