= 2020–21 TSV Hartberg season =

Hartberg
2020–21 season
- Chairman: Brigitte Annerl
- Manager: Markus Schopp
- Stadium: Profertil Arena Hartberg
- Austrian Bundesliga: Regular stage: 7th Relegation round: 1st
- Austrian Cup: Third round
- UEFA Europa League: Second qualifying round
Home colours	Away colours
- All statistics correct as of 24 May 2021.

The 2020–21 TSV Hartberg season was the club's 75th season in existence and its third consecutive season in the top flight of Austrian football. In addition to the domestic league, Hartberg participated in this season's editions of the Austrian Cup and the UEFA Europa League. The season covered the period from 5 July 2020 to 30 June 2021.

== Players ==
=== First-team squad ===
As of 16 October 2020.

Note: Flags indicate national team as defined under FIFA eligibility rules; some limited exceptions apply. Players may hold more than one non-FIFA nationality.

No.	Pos.	Nation	Player
1	GK	AUT	René Swete
4	DF	AUT	Michael Huber
5	DF	AUT	Manfred Gollner
6	DF	AUT	Andreas Lienhart
7	MF	AUT	Julius Ertlthaler
8	MF	NGR	Samson Tijani (on loan from Red Bull Salzburg)
9	FW	SLO	Rajko Rep
10	MF	AUT	Stefan Rakowitz
11	MF	CRO	Matija Horvat
14	DF	AUT	Christian Klem
17	MF	BFA	Abdoul Yoda
18	FW	AUT	Philipp Sturm
20	FW	AUT	Marc Andre Schmerböck
21	GK	AUT	Florian Faist
22	MF	AUT	Florian Flecker

No.	Pos.	Nation	Player
23	DF	AUT	Tobias Kainz
24	FW	AUT	Dario Tadić
27	MF	AUT	Lukas Ried
28	MF	AUT	Jürgen Heil
29	MF	AUT	Sascha Horvath
31	DF	AUT	Thomas Rotter
32	DF	AUT	Felix Luckeneder
34	FW	NGR	Emmanuel Igbonekwu
35	GK	AUT	Raphael Sallinger
37	MF	AUT	Michael John Lema (on loan from Sturm Graz)
39	DF	AUT	Stefan Gölles
42	MF	MLI	Bakary Nimaga
44	GK	AUT	Maximilian Pusswald
45	FW	AUT	Seifedin Chabbi

=== Out on loan ===
Note: Flags indicate national team as defined under FIFA eligibility rules; some limited exceptions apply. Players may hold more than one non-FIFA nationality.

No.	Pos.	Nation	Player
—	DF	AUT	Marcel Schantl (at FC Blau-Weiß Linz)

== Transfers ==
=== In ===
No.	Pos	Player	Transferred from	Fee	Date	Source
15			TBD		1 July 2020	

=== Out ===
No.	Pos	Player	Transferred to	Fee	Date	Source
15			TBD		1 July 2020	

== Pre-season and friendlies ==
Win Draw Loss Fixtures

15 August 2020 Friendly	Hartberg (Austria)	1–4	(Czech Republic) Baník Ostrava	Sankt Johann in der Haide, Austria
16:00 CEST (UTC+2)				Stadium: RM-Stadion

19 August 2020 Friendly	SV Lafnitz (Austria)	Cancelled	(Austria) Hartberg	Lafnitz, Austria
19:00 CEST (UTC+2)				Stadium: Trainingsplatz SV Lafnitz

22 August 2020 Friendly	Austria Klagenfurt	3–1	(Austria) Hartberg	Pöllau, Austria
16:00 CEST (UTC+2)				Stadium: Sparkassenstadion

26 August 2020 Friendly	Hartberg (Austria)	2–1	(Germany) Hannover 96	Bad Waltersdorf, Austria
17:30 CEST (UTC+2)				Stadium: Thermenstadion Bad Waltersdorf

4 September 2020 Friendly	Hartberg (Austria)	Cancelled	(Italy) Hellas Verona	Hartberg, Austria
18:00 CEST (UTC+2)				Stadium: Profertil Arena Hartberg

4 September 2020 Friendly	Hartberg (Austria)	1–0	(Slovenia) Maribor	Hartberg, Austria
16:00 CEST (UTC+2)				Stadium: Profertil Arena Hartberg

9 October 2020 Friendly	SV Lafnitz (Austria)	3–2	(Austria) Hartberg	Lafnitz, Austria
17:00 CEST (UTC+2)				Stadium: Sportplatz Lafnitz

13 November 2020 Friendly	Hartberg (Austria)	2–3	(Austria) Kapfenberger SV	Hartberg, Austria
15:00 CET (UTC+1)				Stadium: Profertil Arena Hartberg

5 February 2021 Friendly	Hartberg (Austria)	2–1	(Austria) SV Lafnitz	Mattersburg, Austria
15:00 CET (UTC+1)				Stadium: Fußballakademie Burgenland

15 February 2021 Friendly	Sturm Graz (Austria)	2–1	(Austria) Hartberg	Graz, Austria
11:00 CET (UTC+1)				Stadium: Messendorf Trainingszentrum

15 March 2021 Friendly	Sturm Graz (Austria)	2–1	(Austria) Hartberg	Graz, Austria
15:00 CET (UTC+1)				Stadium: Messendorf Trainingszentrum

26 March 2021 Friendly	Hartberg (Austria)	3–0	(Austria) Juniors OÖ	Hartberg, Austria
15:00 CET (UTC+1)	Rotter 54', 66'; Luckeneder 84'			Stadium: Profertil Arena Hartberg; Attendance: 0

== Competitions ==
=== Overview ===
Competition	First match	Last match	Starting round	Final position	Record							
Competition	First match	Last match	Starting round	Final position	Pld	W	D	L	GF	GA	GD	Win %
Austrian Football Bundesliga	11 September 2020	21 May 2021	Matchday 1	7th	32	12	11	9	38	48	−10	37.50
Austrian Bundesliga play-offs	24 May 2021		Semi-finals	Semi-finals	1	0	0	1	0	3	−3	0.00
Austrian Cup	30 August 2020	25 November 2020	First round	Third round	3	2	0	1	14	8	+6	66.67
UEFA Europa League	17 September 2020		Second qualifying round	Second qualifying round	1	0	0	1	2	3	−1	0.00
Total					37	14	11	12	54	62	−8	37.84

Last updated: 24 May 2021
Source: Soccerway

=== Austrian Bundesliga ===
==== Regular stage ====
Pos	Team	Pld	W	D	L	GF	GA	GD	Pts	Qualification
5	Wolfsberger AC	22	10	3	9	40	39	+1	33	Qualification for the Championship round
6	WSG Tirol	22	8	6	8	37	34	+3	30	Qualification for the Championship round
7	Hartberg	22	7	8	7	25	38	−13	29	Qualification for the Relegation round
8	Austria Wien	22	6	7	9	31	32	−1	25	Qualification for the Relegation round
9	St. Pölten	22	5	6	11	33	43	−10	21	Qualification for the Relegation round

Source: Austrian Football Bundesliga
Rules for classification: 1) Points; 2) Goal difference; 3) Goals scored; 4) Matches won; 5) Away matches won; 6) Head-to-head points; 7) Head-to-head goal difference; 8) Head-to-head goals scored.

==== Results summary ====
Overall								Home						Away					
Pld	W	D	L	GF	GA	GD	Pts	W	D	L	GF	GA	GD	W	D	L	GF	GA	GD
22	7	8	7	25	38	−13	29	4	4	3	13	16	−3	3	4	4	12	22	−10

Last updated: 21 March 2021.
Source: Austrian Football Bundesliga

==== Results by round ====
Round	1	2	3	4	5	6	7	8	9	10	11	12	13	14	15	16	17	18	19	20	21	22
Ground	A	H	H	A	A	H	A	H	A	H	A	H	A	A	H	H	A	H	A	H	A	H
Result	D	L	D	L	D	W	L	D	W	L	D	W	D	L	L	W	W	D	W	W	L	D
Position	5	10	10	11	12	8	10	10	10	10	8	8	8	9	9	8	7	7	7	6	7	7

Updated to match(es) played on 21 March 2021. Source: Austrian Football Bundesliga
A = Away; H = Home; W = Win; D = Draw; L = Loss

==== Matches ====
The league fixtures were announced on 9 July 2020.

12 September 2020 1	Rheindorf Altach	1–1	Hartberg	Altach
17:00 CEST (UTC+2)	Nussbaumer 38'	Report	Tadić 54'	Stadium: Stadion Schnabelholz; Attendance: 2,600; Referee: Harald Lechner

20 September 2020 2	Hartberg	0–2	Wolfsberger AC	Hartberg
14:30 CEST (UTC+2)	Tijani (yellow card) 31' (yellow-red card) 72'	Report	Novak (yellow card) 19'; Taferner 55'; Vizinger 60'	Stadium: Profertil Arena Hartberg; Attendance: 1,500; Referee: Josef Spurny

27 September 2020 3	Hartberg	1–1	Sturm Graz	Hartberg
14:30 CEST (UTC+2)	Tadić 90+3'	Report	Ljubic 31'	Stadium: Profertil Arena Hartberg; Attendance: 1,500; Referee: Manuel Schüttengruber

4 October 2020 4	Red Bull Salzburg	7–1	Hartberg	Wals-Siezenheim
14:30 CEST (UTC+2)	Onguéné 15'; Vallci 26'; Koïta 47', 90+2'; Daka 70', 79'; Okafor 88' (pen.)	Report	Gollner (yellow card) 21'; Rakowitz 84'	Stadium: Stadion Wals-Siezenheim; Attendance: 0 Referee: Andreas Heiss

25 October 2020 5	WSG Tirol	1–1	Hartberg	Innsbruck
14:30 CEST (UTC+2)	Yeboah 29'	Report	Rep 74'	Stadium: Tivoli Stadion Tirol; Attendance: 450; Referee: Josef Spurny

31 October 2020 6	Hartberg	2–1	Austria Wien	Hartberg
17:00 CET (UTC+1)	Tadić 10', 47'	Report	Pichler 33'	Stadium: Profertil Arena Hartberg; Attendance: 977; Referee: Dieter Muckenhammer

7 November 2020 7	Ried	2–0	Hartberg	Ried im Innkreis
17:00 CET (UTC+1)	Nutz 17'; Paintsil 52'	Report		Stadium: Keine Sorgen Arena; Attendance: 0 Referee: Christopher Jäger

21 November 2020 8	Hartberg	1–1	LASK	Hartberg
17:00 CET (UTC+1)	Luckeneder 53'	Report	Filipović 21'	Stadium: Profertil Arena Hartberg; Attendance: 0 Referee: Alan Kijas

28 November 2020 9	Admira Wacker Mödling	2–3	Hartberg	Maria Enzersdorf
17:00 CET (UTC+1)	Aiwu 10'; Hoffer 19'	Report	Tadić 42' (pen.); Rotter 60'; Chabbi 87'	Stadium: BSFZ-Arena; Attendance: 0 Referee: Felix Ouschan

6 December 2020 10	Hartberg	1–3	Rapid Wien	Hartberg
14:30 CET (UTC+1)	Rotter 66'	Report	Arase 2', 76'; Kara 35'	Stadium: Profertil Arena Hartberg; Attendance: 0 Referee: Sebastian Gishamer

12 December 2020 11	St. Pölten	2–2	Hartberg	Sankt Pölten
17:00 CET (UTC+1)	Schmidt 17'; Ljubičić 25'	Report	Rep 29'; Rotter 84'	Stadium: NV Arena; Attendance: 0 Referee: Dieter Muckenhammer

19 December 2020 12	Hartberg	1–0	Rheindorf Altach	Hartberg
17:00 CET (UTC+1)	Rep 83'	Report		Stadium: Profertil Arena Hartberg; Attendance: 0 Referee: Oliver Drachta

23 January 2021 13	Wolfsberger AC	0–0	Hartberg	Wolfsberg
17:00 CET (UTC+1)		Report		Stadium: Lavanttal-Arena; Attendance: 0 Referee: Manuel Schüttengruber

26 January 2021 14	Sturm Graz	2–1	Hartberg	Graz
18:30 CET (UTC+01:00)	Kiteishvili 22'; Jantscher 25'	Report	Kainz 58'	Stadium: Merkur-Arena; Attendance: 0 Referee: Julian Weinberger

30 January 2021 15	Hartberg	0–3	Red Bull Salzburg	Hartberg
17:00 CET (UTC+01:00)	Nimaga (yellow card) 18'	Report	Koïta 14' (pen.), (yellow card) 24'; Daka 35'; Mwepu 79'	Stadium: Profertil Arena Hartberg; Attendance: 0 Referee: Markus Hameter

14 February 2021 17	Austria Wien	0–1	Hartberg	Vienna
14:30 CET (UTC+1)		Report	Flecker 22'	Stadium: Generali Arena; Attendance: 0 Referee: Walter Altmann

20 February 2021 18	Hartberg	1–1	Ried	Hartberg
17:00 CET (UTC+1)	Tadić 28'	Report	Nutz 3'	Stadium: Profertil Arena Hartberg; Attendance: 0 Referee: Alan Kijas

23 February 2021 16	Hartberg	1–0	WSG Tirol	Hartberg
18:30 CET (UTC+1)	Rep 68'	Report		Stadium: Profertil Arena Hartberg; Attendance: 0 Referee: Harald Lechner

27 February 2021 19	LASK	1–2	Hartberg	Pasching
17:00 CET (UTC+1)	Eggestein 4'; Ranftl (yellow card) 60'	Report	Chabbi 23'; Horvath 26'; Nimaga (yellow card) 33'; Rep (yellow card) 60'	Stadium: Raiffeisen Arena; Attendance: 0 Referee: Felix Ouschan

6 March 2021 20	Hartberg	2–1	Admira Wacker Mödling	Hartberg
17:00 CET (UTC+1)	Gollner 16'; Flecker 53'; Ried (yellow card) 90+3'	Report	Kerschbaum (yellow card) 29'; Starkl 37'; Wooten (yellow card) 90'	Stadium: Profertil Arena Hartberg; Attendance: 0 Referee: Julian Weinberger

14 March 2021 21	Rapid Wien	4–0	Hartberg	Vienna
17:00 CET (UTC+1)	Kara 34', 49'; Ritzmaier (yellow card) 44'; Knasmüllner 69'; Stojković (yellow card) 73'; Hofmann (yellow card) 87'; Alar 88'	Report		Stadium: Allianz Stadion; Attendance: 0 Referee: Christopher Jäger

21 March 2021 22	Hartberg	3–3	St. Pölten	Hartberg
17:00 CET (UTC+1)	Tadić (penalty missed) 30'; Klem (yellow card) 43'; Rep (yellow card) 50'; Nimaga 65', (yellow card) 70'; Chabbi 73'; Horvath 76'	Report	Ljubičić 41'; Booth 67'; Schulz (yellow card) 83', (goal) 90+4'	Stadium: Profertil Arena Hartberg; Attendance: 0 Referee: Josef Spurny

==== Relegation round ====
Pos	Team	Pld	W	D	L	GF	GA	GD	Pts	Qualification	HAR	AWI	RIE	ALT	ADM	STP
1	Hartberg	32	12	11	9	38	48	−10	32	Qualification for the Europa Conference League play-off semi-final	—	1–0	1–1	2–1	2–0	0–0
2	Austria Wien (O)	32	11	9	12	47	43	+4	29	Qualification for the Europa Conference League play-off semi-final	3–1	—	2–2	2–0	0–0	2–1
3	Ried	32	8	9	15	34	57	−23	25		3–2	3–2	—	0–0	0–0	2–1
4	Rheindorf Altach	32	9	7	16	33	55	−22	23		2–2	2–1	3–0	—	0–1	1–0
5	Admira Wacker Mödling	32	6	8	18	27	58	−31	19		0–1	0–2	0–2	1–1	—	2–0
6	St. Pölten (R)	32	5	9	18	39	57	−18	13	Qualification for the relegation play-offs (Note: Since the top two teams of the 2020–21 Austrian Football Second League did not receive a license for the Bundesliga, relegation play-offs will be played between the last-placed club from the Bundesliga and the best-placed club with a license from the Second League.)	0–1	1–2	0–0	3–3	0–1	—

Legend: Blue = home team win; Yellow = draw; Red = away team win.
Rules for classification: 1) Points; 2) Points with (possible) half points subtracted due to rounding; 3) Goal difference; 4) Goals scored; 5) Matches won; 6) Away matches won; 7) Head-to-head points; 8) Head-to-head goal difference; 9) Head-to-head goals scored.
(O) Play-off winners; (R) Relegated

==== Results summary ====
Overall								Home						Away					
Pld	W	D	L	GF	GA	GD	Pts	W	D	L	GF	GA	GD	W	D	L	GF	GA	GD
32	12	11	9	38	48	−10	47	7	6	3	19	18	+1	5	5	6	19	30	−11

Last updated: 21 May 2021.
Source: Austrian Football Bundesliga

==== Results by round ====
Round	1	2	3	4	5	6	7	8	9	10
Ground	A	H	A	H	A	H	H	A	H	A
Result	L	W	W	D	D	W	D	L	W	W
Position	2	1	1	1	2	1	1	2	2	1

Updated to match(es) played on 21 May 2021. Source: Austrian Football Bundesliga
A = Away; H = Home; W = Win; D = Draw; L = Loss

==== Matches ====
3 April 2021 23	Ried	3–2	Hartberg	Ried im Innkreis
17:00 CEST (UTC+2)	Nutz (yellow card) 13'; Grüll 37', 69'; Ziegl (yellow card) 67'; Horvat 71' (o.g.); Satin (yellow card) 83'	Report	Rakowitz 1'; Horvat (yellow card) 6'; Tadić (penalty missed) 17'; Nimaga 34'	Stadium: Keine Sorgen Arena; Attendance: 0 Referee: Andreas Heiß

10 April 2021 24	Hartberg	1–0	Austria Wien	Hartberg
17:00 CEST (UTC+2)	Horvat (yellow card) 44'; Nimaga (yellow card) 77'; Gollner 86' (pen.); Rep (yellow card) 90+2'	Report	Teigl (yellow card) 90+2'; Schösswendter (yellow card) 90+3'; Djuricin (yellow card) 90+3'	Stadium: Profertil Arena Hartberg; Attendance: 0 Referee: Sebastian Gishamer

17 April 2021 25	Admira Wacker Mödling	0–1	Hartberg	Maria Enzersdorf
17:00 CEST (UTC+2)	Vorsager (yellow card) 51'; Malicsek (red card) 67'	Report	Horvat (yellow card) 75'; Chabbi 80'; Kainz (yellow card) 90+2'	Stadium: BSFZ-Arena; Attendance: 0 Referee: Dieter Muckenhammer

20 April 2021 26	Hartberg	0–0	St. Pölten	Hartberg
18:30 CEST (UTC+2)	Klem (yellow card) 85'	Report	Muhamedbegovic (yellow card) 5' (yellow-red card) 87'; Schmidt (yellow card) 87'	Stadium: Profertil Arena Hartberg; Attendance: 0 Referee: Manuel Schüttengruber

24 April 2021 27	Rheindorf Altach	2–2	Hartberg	Altach
17:00 CEST (UTC+2)	Maderner 22'; Gouet 26'	Report	Chabbi 15'; Rep (yellow card) 37'; Nimaga (yellow card) 41'; Flecker 65'; Luckeneder (yellow card) 68'; Tadić (yellow card) 86'	Stadium: Stadion Schnabelholz; Attendance: 0 Referee: Markus Hameter

27 April 2021 28	Hartberg	2–1	Rheindorf Altach	Hartberg
18:30 CEST (UTC+2)	Kainz 22', (yellow card) 46'; Gollner (yellow card) 71'; Ried 85'	Report	Maderner 9', (yellow card) 27'; Meilinger (yellow card) 37'	Stadium: Profertil Arena Hartberg; Attendance: 0 Referee: Julian Weinberger

8 May 2021 29	Hartberg	1–1	Ried	Hartberg
17:00 CEST (UTC+2)	Klem (yellow card) 72'; Rakowitz 83'	Report	Gragger (yellow card) 45'; Bajic 48'	Stadium: Profertil Arena Hartberg; Attendance: 0 Referee: Manuel Schüttengruber

11 May 2021 30	Austria Wien	3–1	Hartberg	Vienna
20:30 CEST (UTC+2)	Wimmer 27'; Fitz 42'; Palmer-Brown (yellow card) 50'; Sarkaria 90+2'	Report	Nimaga (yellow card) 63'; Tijani (yellow card) 65'; Rep 73'	Stadium: Generali Arena; Attendance: 0 Referee: Andreas Heiss

15 May 2021 31	Hartberg	2–0	Admira Wacker Mödling	Hartberg
17:00 CEST (UTC+2)	Ertlthaler 23'; Kainz (yellow card) 40'; Rep 54' (pen.)	Report	Kerschbaum (yellow card) 8'; Maier (yellow card) 49'; Bauer (yellow card) 52'; Auer (yellow card) 52'	Stadium: Profertil Arena Hartberg; Attendance: 0 Referee: Stefan Ebner

21 May 2021 32	St. Pölten	0–1	Hartberg	Sankt Pölten
19:00 CEST (UTC+2)	Pokorný (yellow card) 53'	Report	Sturm 42'; Yoda (red card) 78'	Stadium: NV Arena; Attendance: 0 Referee: Manuel Schüttengruber

==== European competition play-offs ====
24 May 2021 Semi-finals	Hartberg	0–3	Austria Wien	Hartberg
17:00 CEST (UTC+2)	Gollner (yellow card) 15'; Rep (yellow card) 20'	Report	Teigl (yellow card) 12'; Wimmer 35'; Fitz 51'; Suttner (yellow card) 60'; Pichler 78'	Stadium: Profertil Arena Hartberg; Attendance: 0 Referee: Walter Altmann

=== Austrian Cup ===
30 August 2020 First round	Dornbirner SV	0–7	Hartberg	Altach
11:00 CEST (UTC+2)		Report	Tadić 17'; Ried 36'; Luckeneder 43', 64'; Gollner 55'; Heil 73'; Rakowitz 84'	Stadium: Cashpoint Arena; Attendance: 0

17 October 2020 Second round	SV Gmünd	3–4 (a.e.t.)	Hartberg	Gmünd
15:00 CEST (UTC+2)	Allmayer 17'; Gasser 37' (pen.), 90+4' (pen.)	Report	Rotter 21', 83'; Rep 50'; Ertlthaler 114'	Stadium: Sportplatz ASKÖ Gmünd; Attendance: 0

25 November 2020 Third round	Austria Wien	5–3	Hartberg	Wien
17:15 CET (UTC+1)	Grünwald 13'; Zwierschitz 17'; Pichler 41'; Sarkaria 49'; Fitz 65'	Report	Tadić 57'; Horvath 81'; Chabbi 84' (pen.)	Stadium: Generali Arena; Attendance: 0

=== UEFA Europa League ===
17 September 2020 Second qualifying round	Piast Gliwice (Poland)	3–2	(Austria) Hartberg	Gliwice, Poland
20:00 CEST (UTC+2)	Konczkowski 10'; Sokołowski 62'; Żyro 84'	Report	Kainz 33'; Ried 75'	Stadium: Stadion Piast; Attendance: 0 Referee: Erik Lambrechts (Belgium)
