= 2020–21 Austrian Cup =

Tournament details
- Country: Austria
- Teams: 63

Final positions
- Champions: Red Bull Salzburg
- Runners-up: LASK

Tournament statistics
- Matches played: 63
- Goals scored: 243 (3.86 per match)
- Top goal scorer(s): Johannes Eggestein; Fabian Schubert (6 goals each)

The 2020–21 Austrian Cup was the 90th edition of the national cup in Austrian football. The champions of the cup earn a place in the 2021–22 Europa League play-off round.

Red Bull Salzburg were the defending champions after winning the competition in the previous season by defeating Austria Lustenau in the final. Times up to 25 October 2020 and from 28 March 2021 were CEST (UTC+2), and times from 26 October 2020 to 27 March 2021 were CET (UTC+1).

== First round ==
Thirty–one first round matches were played between 28 August and 30 September 2020.

| 30 September 2020 | SC Schwaz | 1–3 | VfB Hohenems | Schwaz |
| 19:00 | Knoflach 27' | Report | Lampert 21'; Stefanon 24'; Cihak 44' (o.g.) | Stadium: Silberstadt Arena |

| 22 September 2020 | SC Weiz | 0–1 | ASK Elektra | Weiz |
| 19:30 | | Report | Silberbauer 42' | Stadium: Stadion Weiz |

| 16 September 2020 | Union Gurten | 1–3 | SCR Altach | Gurten |
| 19:00 | Kienberger 57' | Report | Netzer 88'; Obasi 90'; Fischer 90+3' | Stadium: Park21-Arena |

| 22 September 2020 | SPG Wallern/St. Marienkirchen | 0–1 | SVG Reichenau | Wallern |
| 16:00 | | Report | Thurnbichler 77' | Stadium: Sportanlage Wallern |

| 9 September 2020 | SW Bregenz | 0–10 | Red Bull Salzburg | Bregenz |
| 20:25 | | Report | Koita 13'; Daka 17', 22', 38', 39'; Camara 28'; Mwepu 34'; Sucic 43' (pen.); Okugawa 49'; Wöber 57' | Stadium: ImmoAgentur Stadion |

| 9 September 2020 | SK Vorwärts Steyr | 1–0 | ASK-BSC Bruck/Leitha | Steyr |
| 20:00 | Martinovic 10' | Report | | Stadium: EK Kammerhofer-Arena |

| 9 September 2020 | Wiener Sportclub | 5–0 | SV St. Jakob im Rosental | Wien |
| 19:30 | Paffl 7'; Hirschhofer 22'; Jackel 46'; Gusic 60'; Andrejevic 90+3' | Report | | Stadium: Sportclubplatz |

| 8 September 2020 | FC Deutschkreuz | 0–3 | SC Wiener Neustadt | Deutschkreuz |
| 19:00 | | Report | Bozkurt 48'; Sellinger 53'; Piermayr 59' | Stadium: Deutschkreuz |

| 30 August 2020 | FC Blau-Weiß Linz | 5–1 | Team Wiener Linien | Linz |
| 19:00 | Schubert 4', 9', 48', 70' (pen.); Strauss 33' | Report | Drljepan 66' | Stadium: Linzer Stadion |

| 30 August 2020 | Grazer AK | 0–1 | SV Seekirchen | Graz |
| 18:00 | | Report | Ogunlade 29' | Stadium: Merkur Arena |

| 30 August 2020 | Rapid Wien | 5–0 | TSV St. Johann | Wien |
| 17:30 | Fountas 12', 48', 50'; Kara 22'; Demir 89' | Report | | Stadium: Allianz Stadion |

| 30 August 2020 | Austria Wien | 5–0 | SC Retz | Wien |
| 11:15 | Sax 43'; Monschein 48'; Pichler 76'; Planic 88' (o.g.); Sakaria 90' | Report | | Stadium: Generali Arena |

| 30 August 2020 | Dornbirner SV | 0–7 | TSV Hartberg | Altach |
| 11:00 | | Report | Tadić 17'; Ried 36'; Luckeneder 43', 64'; Gollner 55'; Heil 73'; Rakowitz 84' | Stadium: Cashpoint Arena |

| 29 August 2020 | ASV Siegendorf | 0–3 | LASK | Wiener Neustadt |
| 20:30 | | Report | Gruber 54'; Balic 73'; Raguz 89' | Stadium: Wiener NeustadtArena |

| 29 August 2020 | WSG Swarovski Tirol | 3–1 | USV St. Anna am Aigen | Wattens |
| 19:00 | Dedic 52'; Celic 58'; Anselm 86' | Report | Thurner-Seebacher 30' | Stadium: Gernot Langes Stadion |

| 29 August 2020 | SC Austria Lustenau | 1–2 | SV Stripfing | Lustenau |
| 18:00 | Freitag 81' | Report | Lageder 58' (o.g.); Sulimani 64' | Stadium: Planet Pure Stadion |

| 29 August 2020 | TUS Bad Gleichenberg | 0–1 (a.e.t.) | SV Lafnitz | Feldbach |
| 18:00 | | Report | Wolmuth 100' | Stadium: Stadion Feldbach |

| 29 August 2020 | ASV Schrems | 1–3 | FC Wacker Innsbruck | Schrems |
| 18:00 | Jungr 9' | Report | Jamnig 27', 43'; Zaizen 37' | Stadium: Birkenpark Stadion |

| 29 August 2020 | Floridsdorfer AC | 3–0 | ASV Draßburg | Wien |
| 17:30 | Schmid 42'; Fila 58'; Schmid 85' | Report | | Stadium: FAC-Platz |

| 29 August 2020 | ATSV Wolfsberg | 1–3 | SKN St. Pölten | Wolfsberg |
| 17:00 | Kienleitner 79' | Report | Schulz 21'; Davies 35'; Muhamedbegovic 61' | Stadium: ATSV Arena |

| 29 August 2020 | FC Dornbirn | 1–3 | ASV Allerheiligen | Dornbirn |
| 17:00 | Shabani 61' | Report | Knez 16'; Bernsteiner 30'; Perger 36' | Stadium: Stadion Birkenwiese |

| 28 August 2020 | Sturm Graz | 8–0 | SV Innsbruck | Graz |
| 20:30 | Balaj 4', 28', 86'; Waldhart 9' (o.g.); Stankovic 14'; Friesenbichler 34'; Hierländer 66'; Zettl 82' | Report | | Stadium: Merkur Arena |

| 28 August 2020 | Kapfenberger SV | 5–1 | USK Anif | Kapfenberg |
| 19:30 | Hernaus 1', 22', 29'; Musija 29'; Mensah 45' | Report | Lürzer 9' | Stadium: Franz Fekete Stadion |

| 28 August 2020 | FC Gleisdorf | 1–1 (a.e.t.) (3–5 p) | SV Ried | Gleisdorf |
| 19:30 | Grosse 52' | Report | Nutz 43' | Stadium: Solarstadion |
| | Penalties |
| | Pichorner (penalty scored); Grosse (penalty scored); Wotolen (penalty scored) | | (penalty scored) Sánchez; (penalty scored) Grüll; (penalty scored) Offenbacher; (penalty scored) Ziegl; (penalty scored) Satin |

| 28 August 2020 | SK Austria Klagenfurt | 7–1 | ATSV Stadl-Paura | Klagenfurt |
| 19:00 | Aydin 1', 69'; Mahrer 45+1'; Pink 48'; Markelic 80'; Rusek 83'; Jaritz 89' | Report | Skrgic 60' | Stadium: Wörthersee Stadion |

| 28 August 2020 | SK Treibach | 1–2 | SV Horn | Treibach |
| 19:00 | Vaschauner 62' | Report | Horvat 9'; Cheukoua 20' | Stadium: Turnerwald-Stadion |

| 28 August 2020 | WSC Hertha | 0–3 | Admira Wacker | Wels |
| 19:00 | | Report | Maier 4' (o.g.); Cirkovic 28', 88' | Stadium: Mauth Stadion |

| 28 August 2020 | SV Wörgl | 4–2 | Union Vöcklamarkt | Wörgl |
| 19:00 | Aminpur 9', 12'; Mujanovic 51', 78' | Report | Brandl 15'; Taferner 30' | Stadium: Sportzentrum |

| 28 August 2020 | First Vienna | 4–0 | FC Marchfeld Donauauen | Wien |
| 19:00 | Konrad 28'; Luxbacher 35'; Düzgün 73'; Kreuzhuber 87' | Report | | Stadium: Stadion Hohe Warte |

| 28 August 2020 | SV Grödig | 1–2 | SKU Amstetten | Grödig |
| 19:00 | Jukic 56' | Report | Dirnberger 20'; Stark 90' | Stadium: Untersbergarena |

| 28 August 2020 | Wolfsberger AC | 5–2 (a.e.t.) | SC Neusiedl | Wolfsberg |
| 18:00 | Schmerböck 22'; Dieng 57', 96'; Liendl 100'; Schöfl 102' | Report | Kienzl 64' (pen.); Sommerer 90' | Stadium: Lavanttal-Arena |

| SV Mattersburg | w/o | ASKÖ Gmünd |

== Second round ==
16 second round matches were played between 16 October and 14 November 2020.

| 14 November 2020 | SVG Reichenau | 0–3 | FC Blau-Weiß Linz | Reichenau |
| 16:00 | | Report | Schubert 15', 25'; Mitrovic 51' | Stadium: Kunstrasenplatz |

| 14 November 2020 | ASV Allerheiligen | 0–1 (a.e.t.) | SKU Amstetten | Allerheiligen |
| 15:00 | | Report | Schagerl 117' | Stadium: Sportplatz |

| 18 October 2020 | Wolfsberger AC | 2–2 (a.e.t.) (4–3 p) | SV Ried | Wolfsberg |
| 17:15 | Baumgartner 29'; Liendl 81' (pen.) | Report | Nutz 20'; Ziegl 44' | Stadium: Lavanttal-Arena |
| | Penalties |
| | Schmerböck (penalty scored); Dieng (penalty scored); Wotolen (penalty scored); Liendl (penalty scored) | | (penalty scored) Grüll; (penalty scored) Grubeck; (penalty scored) Ziegl |

| 17 October 2020 | First Vienna | 3–2 | SK Vorwärts Steyr | Wien |
| 20:25 | Stehlik 19'; Luxbacher 39'; Bartholomay 88' | Report | Brandstätter 57'; Martinovic 90+4' | Stadium: Hohe Warte Stadium |

| 17 October 2020 | SC Wiener Neustadt | 1–5 | Rapid Wien | Wiener Neustadt |
| 17:00 | Weidinger 22' | Report | Knasmüllner 77'; Ritzmaier 32', 70'; Kara 45'; Arase 77' | Stadium: Wiener Neustadt Arena |

| 17 October 2020 | FC Wacker Innsbruck | 1–0 | SV Stripfing | Innsbruck |
| 17:00 | Jamnig 88' (pen.) | Report | | Stadium: Tivoli Stadion Tirol |

| 17 October 2020 | LASK | 3–0 | SV Wörgl | Linz |
| 17:00 | Eggestein 29'; Gruber 90'; Michorl 90+3' | Report | | Stadium: Linzer Stadion |

| 17 October 2020 | SCR Altach | 7–0 | SV Seekirchen | Altach |
| 17:00 | Fischer 21', 36'; Maderner 23'; Obasi 70', 89'; Casar 82', 84' | Report | | Stadium: Stadion Schnabelholz |

| 17 October 2020 | VfB Hohenems | 1–2 | Sturm Graz | Hohenems |
| 15:00 | Wunderli 86' | Report | Jantscher 40' (pen.); Balaj 46' | Stadium: Herrenriedstadion |

| 17 October 2020 | SV Gmünd | 3–4 (a.e.t.) | TSV Hartberg | Gmünd |
| 15:00 | Allmayer 17'; Gasser 37' (pen.), 90+4' (pen.) | Report | Rotter 21', 83'; Rep 50'; Ertlthaler 114' | Stadium: Sportplatz ASKÖ Gmünd |

| 17 October 2020 | SKN St. Pölten | 0–3 | Red Bull Salzburg | St. Pölten |
| 14:45 | | Report | Vallci 22'; Mwepu 77'; Ramalho 89' | Stadium: NV Arena |

| 16 October 2020 | Wiener Sportclub | 1–3 | Austria Wien | Wien |
| 20:25 | Andrejevic 89' | Report | Monschein 39' (pen.); Gusic 56' (o.g.); Sarkaria 73' (pen.) | Stadium: Sportclub Platz |

| 16 October 2020 | SV Horn | 0–3 | ASK Elektra | Horn |
| 19:30 | | Report | Fürthaler 77'; Sen 82', 86' | Stadium: Sparkasse Horn Arena |

| 16 October 2020 | SV Lafnitz | 2–4 | SK Austria Klagenfurt | Lafnitz |
| 19:00 | Kröpfl 51' (pen.); Wendler 74' | Report | Mahrer 5'; Rusek 10', 79'; Pink 22' | Stadium: Fußballarena |

| 16 October 2020 | WSG Swarovski Tirol | 0–1 | Floridsdorfer AC | Wattens |
| 18:30 | | Report | Smith 41' (o.g.) | Stadium: Gerrnot Langes Stadion |

| 16 October 2020 | Admira Wacker | 2–2 (a.e.t.) (3–4 p) | Kapfenberger SV | Mödling |
| 18:00 | Kerschbaum 26', 119' | Report | Heric 47'; Musija 118' | Stadium: BSFZ-Arena |
| | Penalties |
| | Kerschbaum (penalty scored); Tomic (penalty scored); Vorsager (penalty scored) | | (penalty scored) Cetina; (penalty scored) Steinlechner; (penalty scored) Horvat; (penalty scored) Lang |

== Third round ==
Eight third round matches were played between 14 November and 16 December 2020.

| 16 December 2020 | LASK | 3–0 | ASK Elektra | Linz |
| 18:00 | Eggestein 2', 15', 34' | Report | | Stadium: Linzer Stadion |

| 16 December 2020 | Red Bull Salzburg | 6–2 | Rapid Wien | Wals-Siezenheim |
| 20:30 | Szoboszlai 16'; Berisha 19'; Koita 23'; Daka 74'; Camara 83' (pen.); Kristensen 88' | Report | Fountas 45+1' (pen.); Ullmann 78' | Stadium: Stadion Wals-Siezenheim |

| 16 December 2020 | Wolfsberger AC | 2–0 | SKU Amstetten | Wolfsberg |
| 16:00 | Baumgartner 9'; Liendl 90+3' | Report | | Stadium: Lavanttal-Arena |

| 16 December 2020 | Kapfenberger SV | 2–0 | FC Blau-Weiß Linz | Kapfenberg |
| 16:00 | Steinlechner 48'; Hernaus 64' | Report | | Stadium: Franz Fekete Stadion |

| 25 November 2020 | First Vienna | 2–1 | SCR Altach | Wien |
| 20:25 | Düzgün 9', 55' | Report | Obasi 20' | Stadium: Hohe Warte Stadium |

| 25 November 2020 | Austria Wien | 5–3 | TSV Hartberg | Wien |
| 17:15 | Grünwald 13'; Zwierschitz 17'; Pichler 41'; Sarkaria 49'; Fitz 65' | Report | Tadić 57'; Horvath 81'; Chabbi 84' (pen.) | Stadium: Generali Arena |

| 25 November 2020 | Sturm Graz | 1–0 | FC Wacker Innsbruck | Graz |
| 17:15 | Kuen 68' | Report | | Stadium: Merkur Arena |

| 14 November 2020 | Floridsdorfer AC | 1–3 (a.e.t.) | SK Austria Klagenfurt | Wien |
| 20:25 | Sahanek 90+1' (pen.) | Report | Pecirep 88', 120+1' (pen.); Hütter 95' | Stadium: FAC-Platz |

== Quarter-finals ==
The four quarter-final matches were played between 5 and 7 February 2021.

| 5 February 2021 | Kapfenberger SV | 1–2 (a.e.t.) | Wolfsberger AC | Kapfenberg |
| 18:00 | Hernaus 45+2' | Report | Liendl 15' (pen.); Novak 118' | Stadium: Franz Fekete Stadium; Referee: Julian Weinberger |

| 5 February 2021 | Sturm Graz | 1–0 | First Vienna | Graz |
| 20:30 | Jantscher 63' | Report | | Stadium: Merkur Arena; Referee: Christopher Jäger |

| 6 February 2021 | Red Bull Salzburg | 2–0 | Austria Wien | Wals-Siezenheim |
| 17:00 | Koïta 41'; Adeyemi 89' | Report | | Stadium: Stadion Wals-Siezenheim; Referee: Manuel Schüttengruber |

| 7 February 2021 | LASK | 5–3 (a.e.t.) | SK Austria Klagenfurt | Linz |
| 17:00 | Eggestein 68', 102'; Balić 70', 98'; Potzmann 111' | Report | Rusek 5'; Hadžić 90+2'; Jaritz 108' | Stadium: Linzer Stadion; Referee: Rene Eisner |

== Semi-finals ==
The semi-final matches were played on 3 March 2021.

| 3 March 2021 | Wolfsberger AC | 0–1 (a.e.t.) | LASK | Wolfsberg |
| 19:00 | | Report | Wiesinger 97' (pen.) | Stadium: Lavanttal-Arena; Attendance: 0 Referee: Sebastian Gishamer |

| 3 March 2021 | Sturm Graz | 0–4 | Red Bull Salzburg | Klagenfurt |
| 21:05 | | Report | Mwepu 36', 54'; Berisha 72'; Aaronson 79' | Stadium: Wörthersee Stadion; Attendance: 0 Referee: Julian Weinberger |
Note: The match was played at Wörthersee Stadion in Klagenfurt instead of Sturm Graz's regular home stadium, the Merkur-Arena in Graz, due to lawn problems there.

== Final ==
The final was played on 1 May 2021.

1 May 2021
20:30

| LASK | 0–3 | Red Bull Salzburg |
|---|---|---|
| | Report | Berisha 45'; Aaronson 66'; Mwepu 88' |

Wörthersee Stadion, Klagenfurt
Attendance: 0
Referee: Walter Altmann

== Top goalscorers ==
| Rank | Player | Club | Goals |
|---|---|---|---|
| 1 | (Germany) Johannes Eggestein | LASK | 6 |
| 1 | (Austria) Fabian Schubert | Blau-Weiß Linz | 6 |
| 3 | (Zambia) Patson Daka | Red Bull Salzburg | 5 |
| 3 | (Austria) Marvin Hernaus | Kapfenberger SV | 5 |
| 3 | (Zambia) Enock Mwepu | Red Bull Salzburg | 5 |
| 6 | (Albania) Bekim Balaj | Sturm Graz | 4 |
| 6 | (Greece) Taxiarchis Fountas | Rapid Wien | 4 |
| 6 | (Austria) Michael Liendl | Wolfsberger AC | 4 |
| 6 | (Nigeria) Chinedu Obasi | SCR Altach | 4 |
| 6 | (Austria) Markus Rusek | Austria Klagenfurt | 4 |

== See also ==
- 2020–21 Austrian Football Bundesliga
