= 2023–24 TSV Hartberg season =

TSV Hartberg
2023–24 season
- Manager: Markus Schopp
- Stadium: Profertil Arena Hartberg
- Austrian Football Bundesliga: 5th
- Austrian Cup: Third round
- Top goalscorer: League: Maximilian Entrup (12); All: Maximilian Entrup (15)

The 2023–24 TSV Hartberg season is the club's 78th season in existence and its sixth consecutive season in the top flight of Austrian football. In addition to the domestic league, TSV Hartberg will participate in this season's edition of the Austrian Cup. The season covers the period from 1 July 2023 to 30 June 2024.

== Players ==
=== First-team squad ===
As of 27 September 2023

Note: Flags indicate national team as defined under FIFA eligibility rules; some limited exceptions apply. Players may hold more than one non-FIFA nationality.

No.	Pos.	Nation	Player
1	GK	AUT	Raphael Sallinger
3	DF	GER	Angelo Brückner (on loan from Bayern Munich II)
4	MF	AUT	Maximilian Sellinger
5	DF	SCO	Ibane Bowat (on loan from Fulham U21)
7	MF	AUT	Fabian Wilfinger
8	FW	AUT	Christoph Urdl
10	FW	KOS	Donis Avdijaj
11	FW	AUT	Maximilian Entrup
12	DF	AUT	Michael Steinwender
14	DF	AUT	Paul Komposch
16	DF	AUT	Manfred Gollner
17	MF	AUT	Mario Kröpfl
18	DF	AUT	Sam Schutti
19	FW	AUT	Jürgen Lemmerer
20	DF	AUT	Manuel Pfeifer
21	GK	AUT	Harald Postl
22	DF	CRO	Marin Karamarko

No.	Pos.	Nation	Player
23	MF	AUT	Tobias Kainz
25	MF	AUT	Julian Halwachs
26	FW	AUT	Christoph Lang (on loan from Sturm Graz)
27	MF	AUT	Dominik Prokop
28	MF	AUT	Jürgen Heil (captain)
30	FW	AUT	Matthias Postl
31	DF	AUT	Thomas Rotter
32	MF	MLI	Ousmane Diakité
33	MF	AUT	Dominik Frieser
37	MF	AUT	Maximilian Fillafer
39	GK	AUT	Tobias Knoflach
40	GK	AUT	Fabian Ehmann
44	GK	AUT	Maximilian Pußwald
45	MF	MLI	Mamadou Sangare (on loan from Red Bull Salzburg)
70	FW	FRA	Ruben Providence
77	MF	AUT	Lind Hajdari
95	DF	AUT	Damjan Kovacevic

=== Out on loan ===
Note: Flags indicate national team as defined under FIFA eligibility rules; some limited exceptions apply. Players may hold more than one non-FIFA nationality.

No.	Pos.	Nation	Player
—	GK	AUT	Elias Scherf (at Amstetten until 30 June 2024)

== Transfers ==
=== In ===
Pos.	Player	Transferred from	Fee	Date	Source

=== Out ===
Pos.	Player	Transferred to	Fee	Date	Source

== Pre-season and friendlies ==
Win Draw Loss Fixtures

5 July 2023 Friendly	Hartberg (Austria)	2–2	(Germany) 1. FC Nürnberg	Bad Wimsbach, Austria
18:00 CEST (UTC+2)	Entrup 22'; Solet 51'		Duah 61'; Dæhli 64'	Stadium: HF-Stadion Bad Wimsbach; Attendance: 150

8 July 2023 Friendly	Leoben (Austria)	0–0	(Austria) Hartberg	Leoben
13:00				Stadium: Monte Schlacko Arena

12 July 2023 Friendly	Hartberg (Austria)	2–3	(Ukraine) Polissya Zhytomyr	Pöllauberg
17:30				Stadium: Naturparkarena Pöllauberg

8 September 2023 Friendly	Hartberg (Austria)	1–1	(Austria) Floridsdorfer AC

13 October 2023 Friendly	Hartberg (Austria)	2–1	(Slovenia) Domžale

13 January 2024 Friendly	Hartberg (Austria)	5–1	(Austria) Deutschlandsberger SC

20 January 2024 Friendly	DAC 1904 (Slovakia)	1–0	(Austria) Hartberg

24 January 2024 Friendly	Hartberg (Austria)	1–0	(Austria) Admira Wacker Mödling

27 January 2024 Friendly	Spartak Trnava (Slovakia)	0–0	(Austria) Hartberg

3 February 2024 Friendly	Hartberg (Austria)	1–1	(Ukraine) Rukh Lviv

22 March 2024 Friendly	Hartberg (Austria)	4–0	(Austria) SV Lafnitz

== Competitions ==
=== Overview ===
Competition	First match	Last match	Starting round	Final position	Record							
Competition	First match	Last match	Starting round	Final position	Pld	W	D	L	GF	GA	GD	Win %
Austrian Football Bundesliga	29 July 2023	19 May 2024	Matchday 1		30	11	9	10	45	47	−2	36.67
Austrian Cup	22 July 2023	1 November 2023	First round	Third round	3	2	1	0	5	3	+2	66.67
Total					33	13	10	10	50	50	+0	39.39

Source: Soccerway

=== Austrian Football Bundesliga ===
==== Regular stage ====
Pos	Team	Pld	W	D	L	GF	GA	GD	Pts	Qualification
3	LASK	22	9	8	5	26	18	+8	35	Qualification for the Championship round
4	Austria Klagenfurt	22	8	10	4	29	27	+2	34 (Note: Head to head points: Klagenfurt 4, TSV Hartberg 1.)	Qualification for the Championship round
5	Hartberg	22	9	7	6	33	28	+5	34	Qualification for the Championship round
6	Rapid Wien	22	8	9	5	38	21	+17	33 (Note: Head to head points: Rapid 4, Austria Wien 1.)	Qualification for the Championship round
7	Austria Wien	22	9	6	7	25	22	+3	33	Qualification for the Relegation round

Source: Austrian Football Bundesliga
Rules for classification: 1) Points; 2) Head-to-head record; 3) Goal difference; 4) Goals scored; 5) Matches won; 6) Away matches won; 7) Away goals scored.

==== Results summary ====
Overall								Home						Away					
Pld	W	D	L	GF	GA	GD	Pts	W	D	L	GF	GA	GD	W	D	L	GF	GA	GD
0	0	0	0	0	0	0	0	0	0	0	0	0	0	0	0	0	0	0	0

Last updated: November 2023.

==== Results by round ====
Round	1
Ground	
Result	
Position	

Updated to match(es) played on November 2023. Source:
A = Away; H = Home; W = Win; D = Draw; L = Loss

==== Matches ====
The league fixtures were unveiled on 27 June 2023.

August 2023 1	v

==== Championship round ====
Pos	Team	Pld	W	D	L	GF	GA	GD	Pts	Qualification
2	Red Bull Salzburg	32	20	7	5	74	29	+45	42	Qualification for the Champions League third qualifying round (Note: Since the Europa League winners, Atalanta qualified for the Champions League via league position, Red Bull Salzburg were promoted from the Champions League second qualifying round to the third qualifying round as one of the two teams with the highest coefficient in the second qualifying round.)
3	LASK	32	14	10	8	43	33	+10	34	Qualification for the Europa League play-off round (Note: The 2023–24 Austrian Cup winners qualified for the Europa League play-off round. Since the cup winners (Sturm Graz) qualified based on league position, the Europa League spot was passed to the third-placed team.)
4	Rapid Wien	32	11	12	9	47	35	+12	28	Qualification for the Europa League second qualifying round
5	Hartberg	32	12	9	11	49	52	−3	28	Qualification for the Conference League play-offs
6	Austria Klagenfurt	32	9	12	11	40	50	−10	22	

Source: Austrian Football Bundesliga
Rules for classification: 1) Points; 2) Points with (possible) half points subtracted due to rounding; 3) Head-to-head points; 4) Head-to-head goal difference; 5) Head-to-head goals scored; 6) Goal difference; 7) Goals scored; 8) Matches won; 9) Away matches won; 10) Away goals scored.

==== Results summary ====
Overall								Home						Away					
Pld	W	D	L	GF	GA	GD	Pts	W	D	L	GF	GA	GD	W	D	L	GF	GA	GD
0	0	0	0	0	0	0	0	0	0	0	0	0	0	0	0	0	0	0	0

Last updated: 12 May 2024.
Source: Worldfootball

==== Results by round ====
Round	1
Ground	
Result	
Position	

Updated to match(es) played on 12 May 2024. Source: Worldfootball
A = Away; H = Home; W = Win; D = Draw; L = Loss

=== Austrian Cup ===
The draw for the season's first round took place on 25 June.

22 July 2023 First round	Favoritner AC	2–3	Hartberg	Vienna
16:00	Mandalovic 82'; Khodadadzada 84'	Report	Entrup 43', 59'; Komposch 78'	Stadium: FavAC-Platzv; Attendance: 2,480; Referee: Markus Hameter

27 September 2023 Second round	FC Flyeralarm Admira	0–1 (a.e.t.)	Hartberg	Maria Enzersdorf
19:30 CET	Malicsek (yellow card) 79'; Keckeisen (yellow card) 108'; Gruber (yellow card) 108'; Gashi (yellow card) 120'	Report	Kainz (yellow card) 70' (goal) 103'; Schopp (red card) 117'	Stadium: Motion invest Arena; Attendance: 798; Referee: Julien Weinberger

1 November 2023 Third round	Hartberg	1–1 (4–5 p)	Red Bull Salzburg	Hartberg
18:00 CET	Sangare (yellow card) 3'; Entrup 67' (Komposch); Halwachs (yellow card) 106'	Report	Sučić (yellow card) 57'; Kjærgaard (yellow card) 68'; Ratkov 77' (Ulmer); Dedić (yellow card) 90+3'; Capaldo (yellow card) 90+3'	Stadium: Profertil Arena Hartberg; Attendance: 2,900; Referee: Walter Altmann
	Penalties
	Frieser (penalty scored); Sallinger (penalty scored); Kainz (penalty scored); Entrup (penalty scored); Avdijaj (penalty missed)		(penalty scored) Šimić; (penalty scored) Ratkov; (penalty scored) Dedić; (penalty scored) Pavlović; (penalty scored) Solet
