= 2020–21 Austrian Football Second League =

47th season of the Austrian second-level football league

Austrian Football Second League
- Season: 2020–21
- Champions: Blau-Weiß Linz
- Promoted: A.Klagenfurt

The 2020–21 Austrian Football Second League was the 47th season of the Austrian second-level football league and the third as the Second League. The league contains 16 teams with one team being promoted to the Austrian Football Bundesliga, and no teams being relegated to the Austrian Regionalliga after the 2020–21 Austrian Regionalliga season was abandoned.

== Teams ==
Sixteen teams participated in the 2020–21 season. The only promoted team was Rapid Wien II from the Austrian Regionalliga East.

Due to the bankruptcy of SV Mattersburg, no club was relegated from the 2019–20 Austrian Football Bundesliga.

Location of teams in the 2020–21 Austrian Football First League

Club Name	City	Stadium	Capacity
Austria Lustenau	Lustenau	Reichshofstadion	8,800
Blau-Weiß Linz	Linz	Donauparkstadion	2,000
Floridsdorfer AC	Vienna	FAC-Platz	3,000
Austria Wien II	Vienna	Generali-Arena	17 500
Kapfenberger SV	Kapfenberg	Franz-Fekete-Stadion	12,000
FC Liefering	Salzburg	Untersberg-Arena	4,128
Rapid Wien II	Wien	Allianz Stadion	28,000
Wacker Innsbruck	Innsbruck	Tivoli Stadion Tirol	16,000
St. Pölten	Sankt Pölten	NV Arena	8,000
Grazer AK	Graz	Merkur-Arena	15,323
FC Dornbirn	Dornbirn	Stadion Birkenwiese	7,500
FC Juniors OÖ	Pasching	Waldstadion	7,870
SV Horn	Horn	Sparkasse Horn Arena	7,870
SKU Amstetten	Amstetten	Ertl Glas Stadion	2,000
SV Lafnitz	Lafnitz	Sportplatz Lafnitz	3,000
Vorwärts Steyr	Steyr	Vorwärts-Stadion	6,000
Austria Klagenfurt	Klagenfurt	Wörthersee Stadion	32,000

=== Personnel and kits ===
Club	Manager	Captain	Kit Manufacturer	Sponsors
Austria Lustenau	(Germany) Alexander Kiene	Christoph Freitag	Uhlsport	Planet Pure
Blau-Weiß Linz	(Austria) Ronald Brunmayr	Bernhard Janeczek	Uhlsport	Linz AG
Floridsdorfer AC			Puma	Wiener Städtische/Wien Energie
Austria Wien II	(Austria) Harald Suchard	Anouar El Moukhantir	Nike	Gazprom Export
Kapfenberger SV	(Bosnia and Herzegovina) Abdulah Ibraković	Matija Horvat	Erima	Murauer
FC Liefering	(Germany) Matthias Jaissle	Daniel Antosch	Nike	Red Bull
Rapid Wien II	(Germany) Steffen Hofmann	Paul Gobara	Adidas	Blitz Blank
Wacker Innsbruck	(Germany) Daniel Bierofka	Lukas Hupfauf	Macron	PEMA-Gruppe
Grazer AK	(Austria) Gernot Plassnegger	Marco Perchtold	Erima	Hpybet
FC Dornbirn	(Austria) Markus Mader	Franco Joppi	Erima	Mohren
FC Juniors OÖ	(Austria) Andreas Wieland	René Gartler		BWT
SV Horn	(Austria) Alexander Schriebl	Florian Sittsam	Macron	Leyrer + Graf
SKU Amstetten	(Austria) Joachim Standfest	Matthias Wurm	Puma	Ertl Glas
SV Lafnitz	(Austria) Philipp Semlic	Andreas Zingl	adidas	Licht Loidl
Vorwärts Steyr	(Austria) Andreas Milot	Thomas Himmelfreundpointner	Erima	Falcoon
Austria Klagenfurt	(Austria) Peter Pacult	Markus Rusek	Erreà	

== League table ==
Pos	Team	Pld	W	D	L	GF	GA	GD	Pts	Qualification
1	Blau-Weiß Linz (Note: Blau-Weiß Linz is not eligible for promotion as they did not apply for a Bundesliga license.) (C)	30	20	3	7	70	31	+39	63	
2	FC Liefering (Note: Feeder teams are ineligible for promotion.)	30	19	6	5	69	31	+38	63	
3	Austria Klagenfurt (P)	30	17	8	5	64	32	+32	59	Qualification to promotion play-offs
4	Wacker Innsbruck	30	17	6	7	50	33	+17	57	
5	SV Lafnitz	30	17	4	9	56	35	+21	55	
6	Grazer AK	30	13	7	10	46	42	+4	46	
7	FC Dornbirn	30	11	5	14	40	53	−13	38	
8	FC Juniors OÖ	30	10	7	13	38	49	−11	37	
9	Floridsdorfer AC	30	10	6	14	39	41	−2	36	
10	Kapfenberger SV	30	9	6	15	34	51	−17	33	
11	Austria Wien II	30	8	8	14	41	52	−11	32	
12	SKU Amstetten	30	8	7	15	38	61	−23	31	
13	Austria Lustenau	30	8	6	16	44	55	−11	30	
14	Rapid Wien II	30	8	6	16	37	53	−16	30	
15	Vorwärts Steyr	30	7	9	14	30	55	−25	30	
16	SV Horn	30	8	6	16	40	62	−22	30 (Note: Due to a punishment, SV Horn is automatically ranked behind other teams when equal on points.)	

Source: 2.Liga Table
Rules for classification: 1) Points; 2) Goal difference; 3) Goals scored; 4) Matches won; 5) Away matches won; 6) Head-to-head points; 7) Head-to-head goal difference; 8) Head-to-head goals scored.
(C) Champions; (P) Promoted

== Season statistics ==
=== Top goalscorers ===
As of 27 May 2021.

Rank	Player	Club	Goals
1	(Austria) Fabian Schubert	Blau-Weiß Linz	33
2	(Slovenia) Benjamin Šeško	FC Liefering	21
3	(Switzerland) Haris Tabaković	Austria Lustenau	18
3	(Austria) Marcus Pink	Austria Klagenfurt	18
5	(Austria) David Peham	SKU Amstetten	17
6	(Austria) Mario Kröpfl	SV Lafnitz	16
7	(Brazil) Ronivaldo Bernardo Sales	Wacker Innsbruck	13
7	(Austria) Marco Sahanek	FAC	13
9	(Austria) Lukas Friderikas	Wacker Innsbruck	12
10	(Spain) Marco Siverio Toro	SV Horn	10

== See also ==
- 2020–21 Austrian Football Bundesliga
- 2020–21 Austrian Cup
