= Lemmerer =

Lemmerer is a German surname. Notable people with the surname include:

- Günther Lemmerer (born 1952), Austrian luger
- Jürgen Lemmerer (born 2003), Austrian footballer
