= Jaeckel =

Jaeckel is a surname. Notable people with the surname include:

- Antonie Jaeckel (1876–1960), German actress
- Barry Jaeckel (born 1949), American professional golfer
- Egbert Jaeckel (1919–1943), Hauptmann in the Luftwaffe during World War II
- Gunther Jaeckel, New York City furrier
- Jake Jaeckel (1942–2019), American baseball pitcher
- John P. Jaeckel (1865–1941), American politician
- Peter Jaeckel, mathematician, and finance academic and practitioner
- Richard Jaeckel (1926–1997), American actor of film and television
- Tracy Jaeckel (1905–1969), American fencer

== See also ==
- Jackel (disambiguation)
