= Jackel =

Jackel or Jäckel is a surname. Notable people with this surname include:

- Eberhard Jäckel (1929–2017), German historian, noted for his studies of Hitler's role in German history
- Janet Jackel, American optical engineer
- Karl Jäckel (1913–1984), German U-boat coxswain in World War II
- Michael Jackel (born 1959), Canadian–German retired professional basketball player
- Thomas Jackel (born 1995), Austrian football player

== See also ==
- Jackal
- Jaeckel
- Jakob (given name)
- Jakal
- JackEL, aka Jack Edward Lozeron, a Canadian DJ, record producer, and songwriter
