= Sandro-Luca Molnar =

Austrian footballer

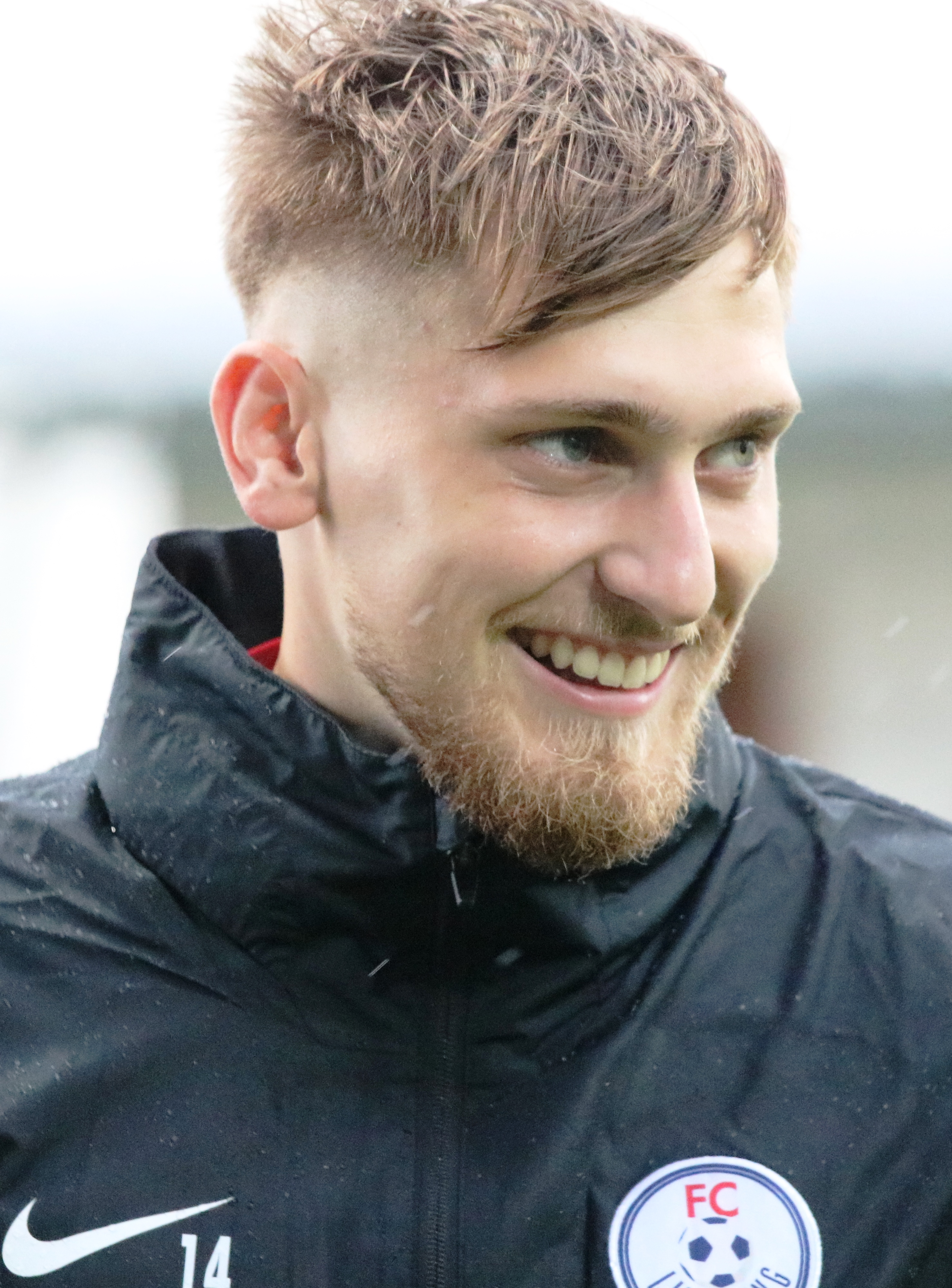

Personal information
- Date of birth: 23 August 2003 (age 23)
- Height: 1.87 m (6 ft 2 in)
- Position: Defender

Team information
- Current team: Sturm Graz II
- Number: 4

Youth career
- 2010–2015: SV Thal
- 2015–2016: Grazer AK
- 2016–2018: Sturm Graz
- 2018–2020: Red Bull Salzburg

Senior career*
Years	Team	Apps	(Gls)
2021–2023	FC Liefering	9	(1)
2023–	Sturm Graz II	7	(0)

International career^{‡}
2017–2018	Austria U15	6	(0)
2019	Austria U17	1	(0)
- * Club domestic league appearances and goals as of 27 October 2023 ‡ National team caps and goals as of 9 March 2021

Sandro-Luca Molnar (born 23 August 2003) is an Austrian professional footballer who plays as a defender for 2. Liga club Sturm Graz II.

== Career statistics ==
=== Club ===
As of 9 March 2021.

Appearances and goals by club, season and competition
Club	Season	League			Cup		Continental		Other		Total	
Club	Season	Division	Apps	Goals	Apps	Goals	Apps	Goals	Apps	Goals	Apps	Goals
FC Liefering	2020–21	2. Liga	4	1	0	0	–		0	0	4	1
Career total			4	1	0	0	0	0	0	0	4	1
