= Raphael Sallinger =

Austrian footballer

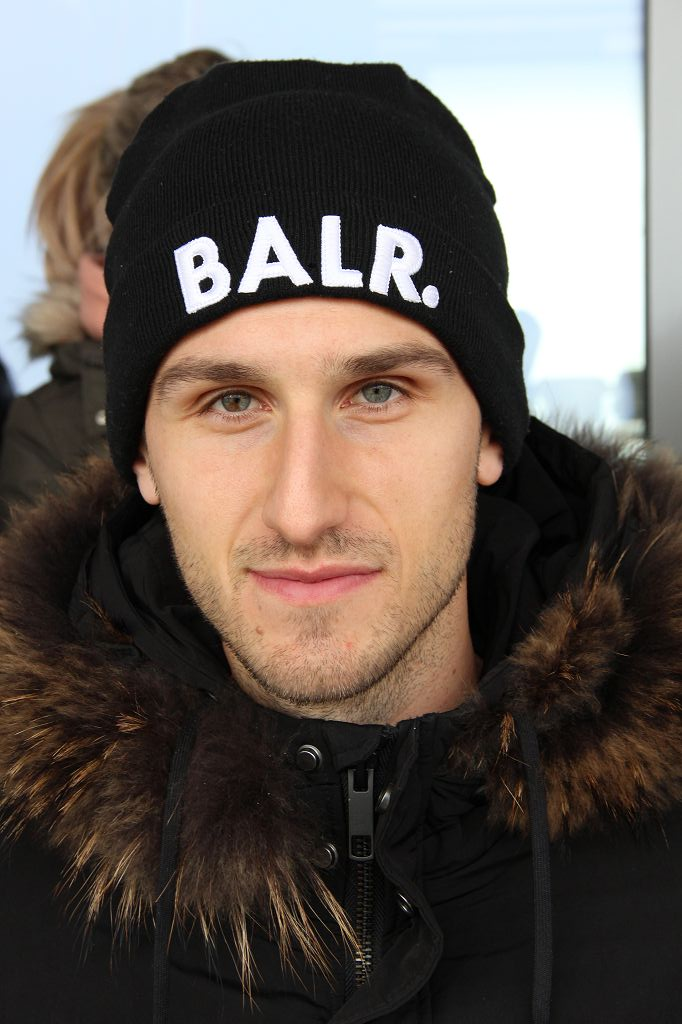

Personal information
- Full name: Raphael Lukas Sallinger
- Date of birth: 8 December 1995 (age 30)
- Place of birth: Klagenfurt, Austria
- Height: 1.96 m (6 ft 5 in)
- Position: Goalkeeper

Team information
- Current team: Hibernian
- Number: 1

Youth career
- 2001–2007: FC Kärnten
- 2007–2012: FC Welzenegg

Senior career*
Years	Team	Apps	(Gls)
2012–2013	SC Kalsdorf	8	(0)
2014–2016	1. FC Kaiserslautern II	20	(0)
2014–2016	1. FC Kaiserslautern	0	(0)
2016–2018	Wolfsberger AC	6	(0)
2018–2025	TSV Hartberg	90	(0)
2025–	Hibernian	33	(0)

International career^{‡}
2015	Austria U20	1	(0)
- * Club domestic league appearances and goals as of 20 May 2026 ‡ National team caps and goals as of 30 March 2015

Raphael Lukas Sallinger (born 8 December 1995) is an Austrian professional footballer who plays as a goalkeeper for Scottish Premiership club Hibernian.

== Club career ==
He made his Austrian Football Bundesliga debut for Wolfsberger AC on 29 April 2017 in a game against SV Mattersburg.

After seven years with TSV Hartberg, Sallinger signed for Scottish Premiership club Hibernian in June 2025. He was regarded to have established himself as a regular starter while playing for the club. He kept six clean sheets in his first seventeen league appearances while playing for them.

== International career ==
Sallinger is an Austria youth international. He played for the Austria national under-20 football team. .

== Personal life ==
Sallinger has been in a relationship with Austria nutritionist Darinka Stock.

== Career statistics ==
As of match played 28 May 2024

Appearances and goals by club, season and competition
Club	Season	League			Cup		Other		Total	
Club	Season	Division	Apps	Goals	Apps	Goals	Apps	Goals	Apps	Goals
Welzenegg	2012–13	Kärntner Liga	4	0	—		—		4	0
SC Kalsdorf	2012–13	Austrian Regionalliga Central	8	0	2	0	—		10	0
FC Kaiserslautern II	2013–14	Regionalliga Südwest	0	0	—		—		0	0
FC Kaiserslautern II	2014–15	Regionalliga Südwest	11	0	—		—		11	0
FC Kaiserslautern II	2015–16	Regionalliga Südwest	9	0	—		—		9	0
FC Kaiserslautern II	Total		20	0	—		—		20	0
FC Kaiserslautern	2014–15	2. Bundesliga	0	0	0	0	—		0	0
Wolfsberger II	2016–17	Kärntner Liga	17	0	—		—		17	0
Wolfsberger AC	2016–17	Austrian Bundesliga	1	0	0	0	0	0	1	0
Wolfsberger AC	2017–18	Austrian Bundesliga	5	0	1	0	0	0	6	0
Wolfsberger AC	Total		6	0	1	0	0	0	7	0
TSV Hartberg	2018–19	Austrian Bundesliga	0	0	1	0	—		1	0
TSV Hartberg	2019–20	Austrian Bundesliga	1	0	0	0	0	0	1	0
TSV Hartberg	2020–21	Austrian Bundesliga	1	0	0	0	0	0	1	0
TSV Hartberg	2021–22	Austrian Bundesliga	5	0	2	0	0	0	7	0
TSV Hartberg	2022–23	Austrian Bundesliga	20	0	1	0	0	0	21	0
TSV Hartberg	2023–24	Austrian Bundesliga	34	0	3	0	0	0	37	0
TSV Hartberg	Total		61	0	7	0	0	0	68	0
Career total			116	0	10	0	0	0	126	0
