= Marco Siverio =

Spanish footballer

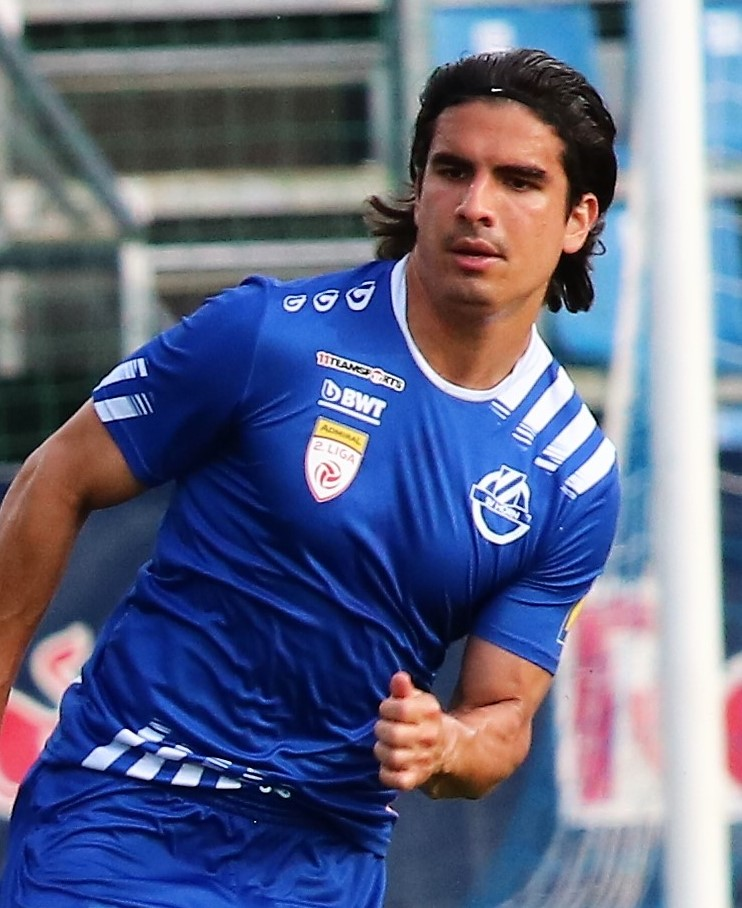
- Siverio in 2022

Personal information
- Full name: Marco Siverio Toro
- Date of birth: 4 October 1994 (age 32)
- Place of birth: El Rosario, Spain
- Height: 1.80 m (5 ft 11 in)
- Position: Forward

Team information
- Current team: Jaén
- Number: 9

Youth career
- Laguna
- Tenerife

College career
Years	Team	Apps	(Gls)
2013	Talladega Tornadoes	16	(10)
2014–2016	Delaware Fightin' Blue Hens	53	(2)

Senior career*
Years	Team	Apps	(Gls)
2017–2018	Atlético Unión Güímar		
2018–2019	Stadl-Paura	27	(17)
2019–2020	Buzanada	14	(5)
2020–2022	Horn	58	(16)
2022–2023	FC Juniors OÖ	29	(26)
2023–2024	SKU Amstetten	11	(2)
2024	Podbeskidzie	5	(0)
2024–2025	Unión Sur Yaiza	32	(6)
2025–2026	Moscardó	20	(6)
2026–	Jaén	14	(6)
- * Club domestic league appearances and goals as of 7 May 2026

Marco Siverio Toro (Note: In this Spanish name, the first or paternal surname is Siverio and the second or maternal family name is Toro.) (born 4 October 1994) is a Spanish professional footballer who plays as a forward for Segunda Federación club Jaén.

== Career statistics ==
=== Club ===
As of match played 29 August 2024

Appearances and goals by club, season and competition
Club	Season	League			Cup		Other		Total	
Club	Season	Division	Apps	Goals	Apps	Goals	Apps	Goals	Apps	Goals
Stadl-Paura	2018–19	Regionalliga Mitte	27	17	2	0	—		29	17
Buzanada	2019–20	Tercera División	14	5	0	0	—		14	5
Horn	2020–21	2. Liga	29	10	2	0	—		31	10
Horn	2021–22	2. Liga	29	6	1	0	—		30	6
Horn	Total		58	16	3	0	—		61	16
FC Juniors OÖ	2022–23	Regionalliga Mitte	26	23	—		—		26	23
FC Juniors OÖ	2023–24	Regionalliga Mitte	3	3	—		—		3	3
FC Juniors OÖ	Total		29	26	—		—		29	26
SKU Amstetten	2023–24	2. Liga	11	2	2	0	—		13	2
Podbeskidzie	2023–24	I liga	5	0	—		—		5	0
Unión Sur Yaiza	2024–25	Segunda Federación	3	1	0	0	—		3	1
Career total			144	66	7	0	0	0	151	66
