= Julian Halwachs =

Austrian footballer

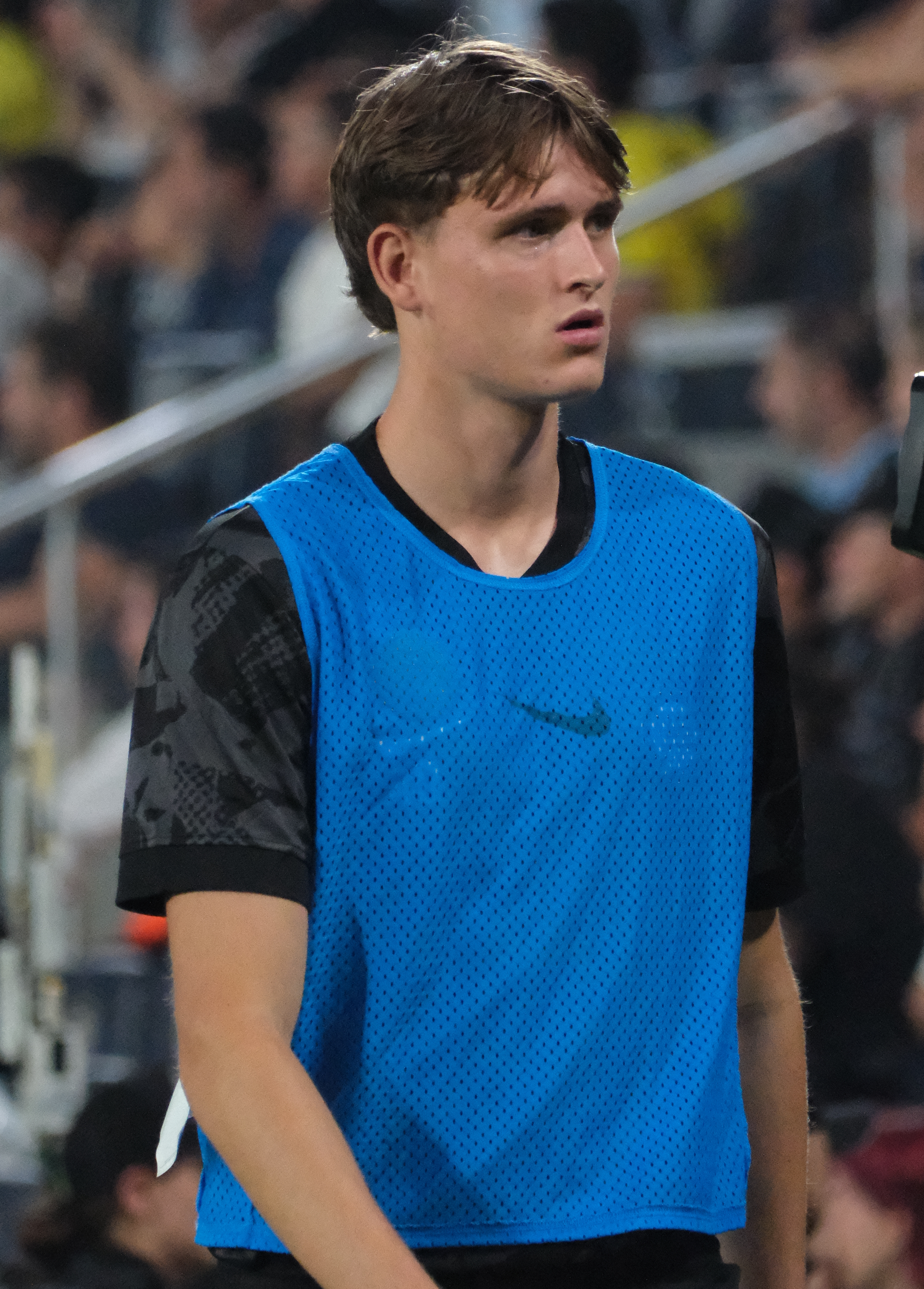

Personal information
- Date of birth: 25 January 2003 (age 23)
- Height: 1.88 m (6 ft 2 in)
- Position: Midfielder

Team information
- Current team: Sturm Graz II
- Number: 8

Youth career
- 2008–2009: SC Grafenschachen
- 2009: SC Pinkafeld
- 2009–2013: SC Grafenschachen
- 2013–2015: TSV Hartberg
- 2015–2017: Sturm Graz
- 2017–2021: Red Bull Salzburg

Senior career*
Years	Team	Apps	(Gls)
2021–2023	FC Liefering	16	(1)
2023–2026	TSV Hartberg	26	(0)
2024–2025	→ ASK Voitsberg (loan)	15	(3)
2026–	Sturm Graz	3	(0)
2026–	Sturm Graz II	4	(2)
- * Club domestic league appearances and goals as of 25 October 2026

Julian Halwachs (born 25 January 2003) is an Austrian professional footballer who plays as a midfielder for Sturm Graz II.

== Career statistics ==
=== Club ===
As of 29 October 2026.

Appearances and goals by club, season and competition
Club	Season	League			Cup		Europe		Other		Total	
Club	Season	Division	Apps	Goals	Apps	Goals	Apps	Goals	Apps	Goals	Apps	Goals
FC Liefering	2021–22	2. Liga	9	1	0	0	–		0	0	9	1
FC Liefering	2022–23	2. Liga	7	0	0	0	–		0	0	7	0
FC Liefering	Total		16	1	0	0	–		0	0	16	1
TSV Hartberg	2023–24	Austrian Bundesliga	20	0	2	0	–		–		22	0
TSV Hartberg	2024–25	Austrian Bundesliga	0	0	0	0	–		–		0	0
TSV Hartberg	2025–26	Austrian Bundesliga	6	0	0	0	–		–		6	0
TSV Hartberg	Total		26	0	2	0	–		–		28	0
ASK Voitsberg (loan)	2024–25	2. Liga	15	3	1	0	–		–		16	3
Sturm Graz	2026–27	Austrian Bundesliga	3	0	2	0	3 (Note: One appearance in UEFA Champions League, two appearances in UEFA Europa League)	0	–		8	0
Sturm Graz II	2026–27	2. Liga	4	2	–		–		–		4	2
Career total			61	6	8	0	3	0	0	0	72	6
