= Ruben Providence =

Haitian footballer (born 2001)

Personal information
- Full name: Ruben Fritzner Providence
- Date of birth: 7 July 2001 (age 25)
- Place of birth: Lagny-sur-Marne, France
- Height: 1.78 m (5 ft 10 in)
- Positions: Winger; forward

Team information
- Current team: Bodrumspor
- Number: 80

Youth career
- 2013–2014: US Torcy
- 2014–2019: Paris Saint-Germain
- 2019–2021: Roma

Senior career*
Years	Team	Apps	(Gls)
2021–2023	Roma	0	(0)
2021	→ Club Brugge (loan)	0	(0)
2022	→ Estoril (loan)	0	(0)
2022–2023	→ TSV Hartberg (loan)	21	(6)
2023–2024	TSV Hartberg	29	(2)
2024–2026	Almere City	47	(1)
2026–	Bodrumspor	3	(0)

International career^{‡}
2019–2020	France U19	9	(1)
2025–	Haiti	22	(3)
- * Club domestic league appearances and goals as of 20 September 2026 ‡ National team caps and goals as of 4 October 2026

Ruben Fritzner Providence (born 7 July 2001) is a professional footballer who plays as a winger or forward for TFF 1. Lig club Bodrumspor in Turkey. Born in France, he plays for the Haiti national team.

== Career ==
In 2019, Providence joined the youth academy of Italian side Roma. In 2021, he was sent on loan to Club Brugge in Belgium. Before the second half of 2021–22, he was sent on loan to Portuguese club Estoril.

In 2022, Providence was sent on loan to TSV Hartberg in Austria. On 2 October 2022, he debuted for TSV Hartberg during a 3–2 loss to Austria Klagenfurt.

On 3 August 2024, Providence featured as a trialist for Swansea City in a friendly against Rio Ave, where he would provide an assist. On 29 August 2024, Providence signed a three-year contract with Almere City in the Netherlands.

On 27 August 2026, Providence signed a contract with Turkish club Bodrumspor for two years with an option for a third.

== Personal life ==
Born in France, Providence is of Haitian and Lao descent. He is a youth international for France, having played for the France U19s. In March 2025, he was called up to the Haiti national team for a set of friendlies.

== Career statistics ==
=== Club ===
As of match played 20 September 2026

Appearances and goals by club, season and competition
Club	Season	League			Cup		Europe		Other		Total	
Club	Season	Division	Apps	Goals	Apps	Goals	Apps	Goals	Apps	Goals	Apps	Goals
Roma	2020–21	Serie A	0	0	0	0	0	0	—		0	0
Club Brugge (loan)	2021–22	Belgian Pro League	0	0	0	0	0	0	0	0	0	0
Estoril (loan)	2021–22	Primeira Liga	0	0	0	0	—		0	0	0	0
TSV Hartberg (loan)	2022–23	Austrian Bundesliga	21	6	0	0	—		—		21	6
TSV Hartberg	2023–24	Austrian Bundesliga	29	2	3	0	—		—		32	2
TSV Hartberg	2024–25	Austrian Bundesliga	0	0	1	2	—		—		1	2
TSV Hartberg	Total		29	2	4	2	—		—		33	4
Almere City	2024–25	Eredivisie	22	0	1	0	—		—		23	0
Almere City	2025–26	Eerste Divisie	25	1	2	0	—		3 (Note: Appearances in promotion play-offs)	0	30	1
Almere City	Total		47	1	3	0	—		3	0	53	1
Bodrumspor	2026–27	TFF 1. Lig	3	0	0	0	—		—		3	0
Career total			100	9	7	2	0	0	3	0	110	11

=== International ===
As of match played 4 October 2026

Appearances and goals by national team and year
National team	Year	Apps	Goals
Haiti	2025	11	2
Haiti	2026	11	1
Total		22	3

Scores and results list Haiti's goal tally first, score column indicates score after each Providence goal.

List of international goals scored by Ruben Providence
No.	Date	Venue	Opponent	Score	Result	Competition
1	7 June 2025	Trinidad Stadium, Oranjestad, Aruba	Aruba	3–0	5–0	2026 FIFA World Cup qualification
2	18 November 2025	Ergilio Hato Stadium, Willemstad, Curaçao	Nicaragua	2–0	2–0	2026 FIFA World Cup qualification
3	2 June 2026	Inter Miami CF Stadium, Fort Lauderdale, United States	New Zealand	1–0	4–0	Friendly
