= Samson Tijani =

Nigerian footballer (born 2002)

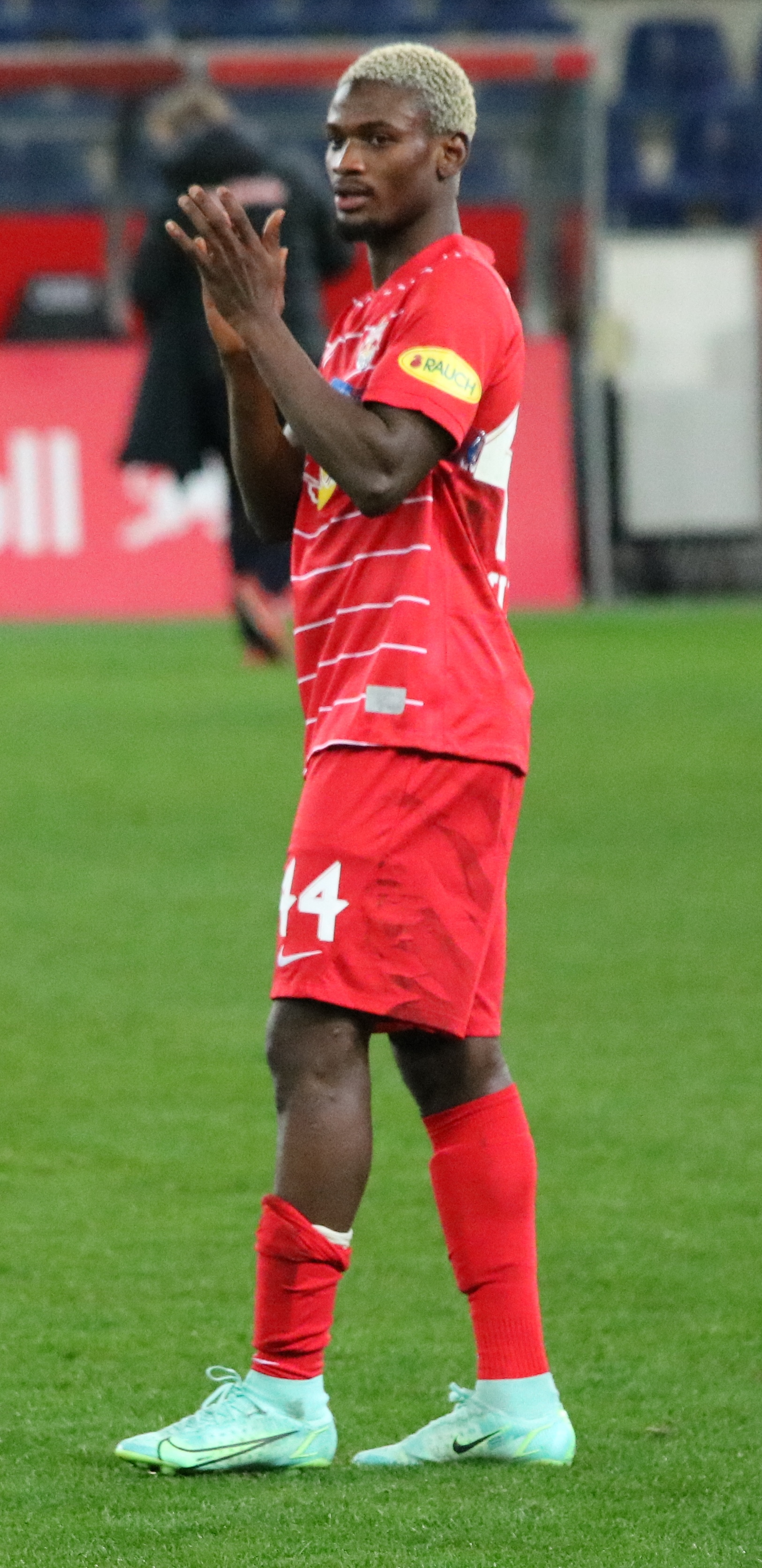
- Tijani in 2022

Personal information
- Full name: Samson Okikiola Tijani
- Date of birth: 17 May 2002 (age 24)
- Place of birth: Enugu, Nigeria
- Height: 1.75 m (5 ft 9 in)
- Position: Midfielder

Team information
- Current team: Podbrezová (on loan from Dukla Prague)
- Number: 6

Youth career
- –2020: Collins Edwin Sports Club
- 2019–2020: → FDC Vista Gelendzhik (loan)

Senior career*
Years	Team	Apps	(Gls)
2020–2025	Red Bull Salzburg	3	(0)
2020–2021	→ TSV Hartberg (loan)	14	(0)
2021–2022	→ FC Liefering (loan)	16	(0)
2023–2024	→ Wolfsberger AC (loan)	27	(1)
2024	→ Fredrikstad (loan)	3	(0)
2025–	Dukla Prague	24	(0)
2026-	→ Podbrezová (loan)	2	(0)

International career^{‡}
2019	Nigeria U17	9	(2)
2020–	Nigeria	3	(0)
- * Club domestic league appearances and goals as of 21 September 2026 ‡ National team caps and goals as of 30 May 2026

Samson Okikiola Tijani (born 17 May 2002) is a Nigerian professional footballer who plays as a midfielder for Podbrezová on loan from Czech First League club Dukla Prague. He also represents the Nigeria national team.

== Club career ==
=== Red Bull Salzburg ===
Tijani began his career with Collins Edwin Sports Club before signing with Austrian Bundesliga side Red Bull Salzburg on 17 July 2020.

In the 2021–22 winter break, Tijani was promoted to Red Bull Salzburg's main squad. On 6 February 2022, Tijani made his professional debut for the club in the Cup match against LASK. He came in in the 89th minute for Nicolas Capaldo in a 3–1 win.

In the match played with Austria Wien on 22 July 2022, fractures occurred in his tibia and lower muscle, and he had to leave the game.

==== Loan to TSV Hartberg ====
A month later, on 14 August, Tijani was loaned out to TSV Hartberg for the season. He made his competitive debut for the club on 30 August against Dornbirner SV in the Austrian Cup. He started and played the full match as Hartberg won 7–0. On 12 September 2020, Tijani made his professional debut for the club in the league against Rheindorf Altach. He started and played 71 minutes in a 1–1 draw. He had a successful performance in the 18 games he played there, but did not contribute any goals or assists.

==== Loan to FC Liefering ====
On 1 July 2021 Tijani was loaned out to FC Liefering on a season long loan.

==== Loan to Wolfsberger AC ====
On 23 August 2023, Tijani joined Wolfsberger AC on a season-long loan deal.

==== Loan to Fredrikstad ====
On 3 September 2024, he joined Norwegian Eliteserien club Fredrikstad, on loan until the end of the year.

=== Dukla Prague ===
On 20 June 2025, Tijani signed a multi-year contract with Czech First League club Dukla Prague as a free agent.

== International career ==
Tijani was part of the Nigeria side to compete in the Africa U-17 Cup of Nations, Where they came 4th and qualified for the 2019 FIFA U-17 World Cup. During his team's opening match against Hungary, Tijani scored a brace as Nigeria U17 won 4–2. Tijani made his debut with the senior Nigeria national team in a friendly 1-0 loss to Algeria on 9 October 2020.

== Career statistics ==
=== Club ===
As of match played 28 September 2024

Appearances and goals by club, season and competition
Club	Season	League			Cup		Continental		Other		Total	
Club	Season	Division	Apps	Goals	Apps	Goals	Apps	Goals	Apps	Goals	Apps	Goals
Red Bull Salzburg	2020–21	Austrian Bundesliga	0	0	0	0	0	0	0	0	0	0
Red Bull Salzburg	2021–22	Austrian Bundesliga	3	0	1	0	1 (Note: Appearances in UEFA Champions League)	0	—		5	0
Red Bull Salzburg	2022–23	Austrian Bundesliga	0	0	0	0	0	0	—		0	0
Red Bull Salzburg	2024–25	Austrian Bundesliga	0	0	0	0	0	0	0	0	0	0
Red Bull Salzburg	Total		3	0	1	0	1	0	0	0	5	0
TSV Hartberg (loan)	2020–21	Austrian Bundesliga	14	0	3	0	1 (Note: Appearances in UEFA Europa League)	0	—		18	0
FC Liefering (loan)	2021–22	2. Liga	16	0	0	0	0	0	—		16	0
Wolfsberger AC (loan)	2023–24	Austrian Bundesliga	27	1	1	0	—		—		28	1
Fredrikstad (loan)	2024	Eliteserien	3	0	1	0	—		—		4	0
Career total			63	0	6	0	2	0	0	0	71	1

=== International ===
As of match played 30 May 2026

Appearances and goals by national team and year
National team	Year	Apps	Goals
Nigeria	2020	1	0
Nigeria	2026	2	0
Total		3	0

== Honours ==
- Austrian Bundesliga: 2021-22
- Austrian Cup: 2021-22

Fredrikstad

- Norwegian Cup: 2024
