= Gunther Jaeckel =

American fashion designer

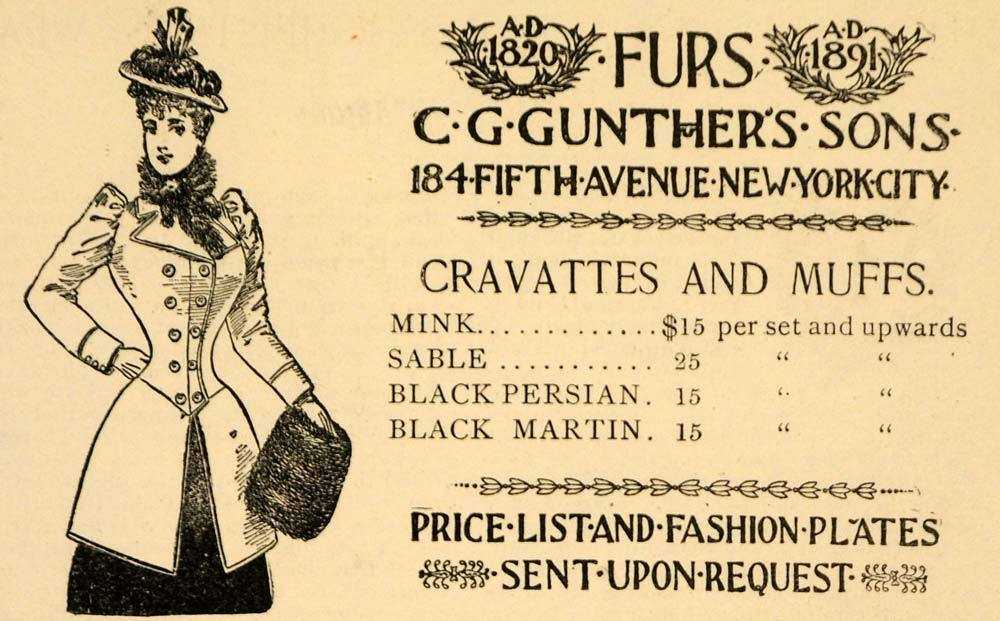

Gunther Jaeckel was an American furrier based in New York City. In 1949, the two old-line furriers Gunther & Sons Inc. and Jaeckel Inc. merged into Gunther Jaeckel to widen their product line beyond furs to ladies’ dresses and suits.

Gunther Jaeckel purchased Adrian’s entire spring 1948 collection, which was sold in its store at 10 East 57th Street. In 1959 Walter Hoving, the owner of Bonwit Teller and Tiffany & Co took control of Gunther Jaeckel. At that time in April 1961 Andy Warhol was charged by Bonwit Teller to do the window display for Gunther Jaeckel. Among her famous clients and fan of Gunther Jaeckel's furs was Marilyn Monroe.
