= Luka Gusić =

Croatian footballer

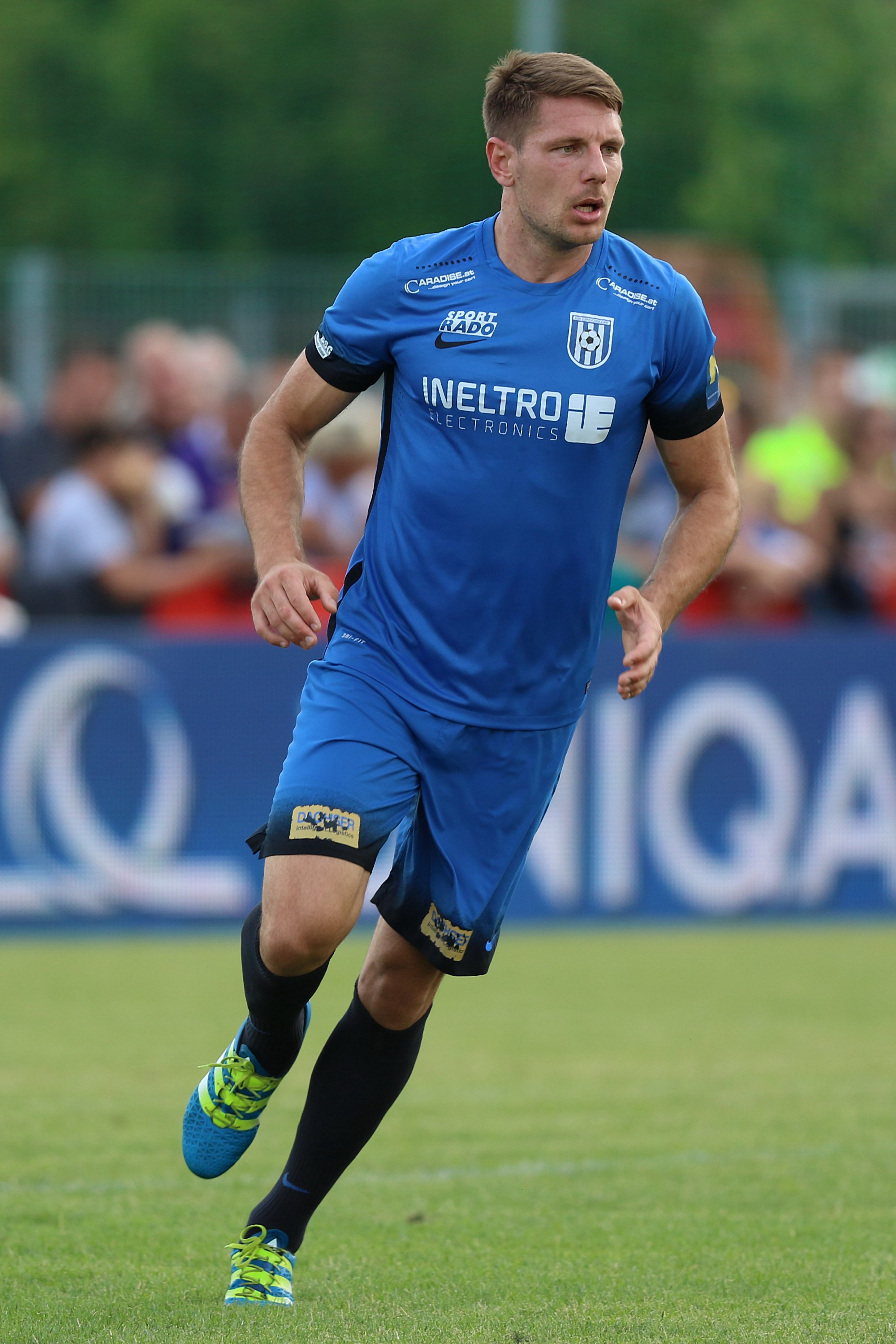

Personal information
- Full name: Luka Gusić
- Date of birth: 27 September 1989 (age 37)
- Place of birth: Split, SFR Yugoslavia
- Height: 1.92 m (6 ft 3 1/2 in)
- Position: Centre-back

Team information
- Current team: Wiener SC
- Number: 5

Youth career
- NK OSK Otok

Senior career*
Years	Team	Apps	(Gls)
2005–2008	NK OSK Otok		
2008–2009	Junak Sinj	33	(1)
2010	Šibenik	6	(0)
2010	→ Dugopolje (loan)	12	(0)
2011	Dugopolje	27	(1)
2012	Jagiellonia	11	(0)
2013	Podbeskidzie	0	(0)
2013–2014	RW Frankfurt		
2014–2015	Ober-Grafendorf	28	(6)
2015–2016	1.SC Sollenau	29	(5)
2016–2017	FC Stadlau	25	(4)
2017–2020	ASK Ebreichsdorf	55	(6)
2020–	Wiener SC	66	(10)
- * Club domestic league appearances and goals as of 20:05, 24 September 2024 (UTC)

Luka Gusić (born 27 September 1989) is a Croatian professional footballer who plays as a centre-back for Austrian club Wiener Sport-Club.

== Club career ==
Gusić entered the youth ranks of his local club NK OSK Otok at the age of five, joining the senior team of his low-tier klub at the age of 15. He joined the Druga HNL team NK Junak from nearby Sinj aged 18, making himself a staple in the first team before being snapped up by the Prva HNL team HNK Šibenik at the beginning of 2010. He was loaned next summer to NK Dugopolje, making the deal permanent not long afterwards. His games for the 2011–12 Druga HNL autumn leader drew attention from the Polish Ekstraklasa club Jagiellonia Białystok, and he moved to Poland on a three-and-a-half-year deal in February 2012.

He has been playing at the 4th and 3rd level of Austrian football since 2014.
