= Thomas Himmelfreundpointner =

Austrian footballer

Personal information
- Date of birth: 22 December 1987 (age 38)
- Place of birth: Austria
- Height: 1.78 m (5 ft 10 in)
- Position: Midfielder

Team information
- Current team: ASK St. Valentin

Youth career
- SV Losenstein

Senior career*
Years	Team	Apps	(Gls)
–2007	SV Losenstein		
2007–2009	ATSV Neuzeug		
2009–2012	SV Sierning		
2012–2015	Union St. Florian	68	(7)
2015–2021	Vorwärts Steyr	152	(10)
2021–	ASK St. Valentin	1	(0)
- * Club domestic league appearances and goals as of 11 September 2021

Thomas Himmelfreundpointner (born 22 December 1987) is an Austrian professional footballer who plays as a midfielder for Austrian club ASK St. Valentin in the fourth-tier OÖ Liga.

== Club career ==
Himmelfreundpointner began his career in the lower tiers of Austrian amateur football with SV Losenstein and ATSV Neuzeug. He joined fourth-tier club SV Sierning in 2009, scoring in his first league appearance on 18 August. In his three seasons with the club he made 75 appearances and scored 14 goals. In 2012 he moved up another level and joined Regionalliga side Union St. Florian. He missed a significant portion of his second year with a torn ligament in his shoulder, but still made 68 league appearances and scored seven goals in three seasons.

In 2015, Himmelfreundpointner signed with fellow Regionalliga side Vorwärts Steyr, the club he had supported in his childhood. He helped them secure promotion to the Austrian Football Second League in 2017–18, completing his path to professional football.

Himmelfreundpointner made his second-tier debut on 27 July 2018, playing the full 90 minutes of a 1–1 draw with SV Ried. After starting goalkeeper Reinhard Großalber's retirement in April 2020, he became team captain and was signed to an extension.
