= Lukas Ried =

Austrian footballer

Personal information
- Date of birth: 10 October 1995 (age 31)
- Place of birth: Austria
- Height: 1.78 m (5 ft 10 in)
- Position: Midfielder

Team information
- Current team: SV Oberwart
- Number: 10

Youth career
- 2008–2010: TSV Hartberg
- 2010–2011: Admira Wacker

Senior career*
| Years | Team | Apps | (Gls) |
| 2011–2016 | TSV Hartberg | 45 | (6) |
| 2016–2018 | SV Lafnitz | 19 | (1) |
| 2019–2021 | TSV Hartberg | 48 | (2) |
| 2019 | TSV Hartberg II | 12 | (11) |
| 2022–2023 | FC Hertha Wels | 44 | (33) |
| 2023– | SV Oberwart | 90 | (46) |
- * Club domestic league appearances and goals as of 28 June 2026

Lukas Ried (born 10 October 1995) is an Austrian football player who plays as a midfielder for SV Oberwart.

== Career ==
=== SV Lafnitz ===
Ried left SV Lafnitz at the end of 2018.

=== SV Oberwart ===
On 6 July 2023, Ried joined SV Oberwart.

== Honours ==
=== Club ===
SV Lafnitz

- Austrian Regionalliga Central (1) 2017-18
