= Rajko Rep =

Slovenian footballer (born 1990)

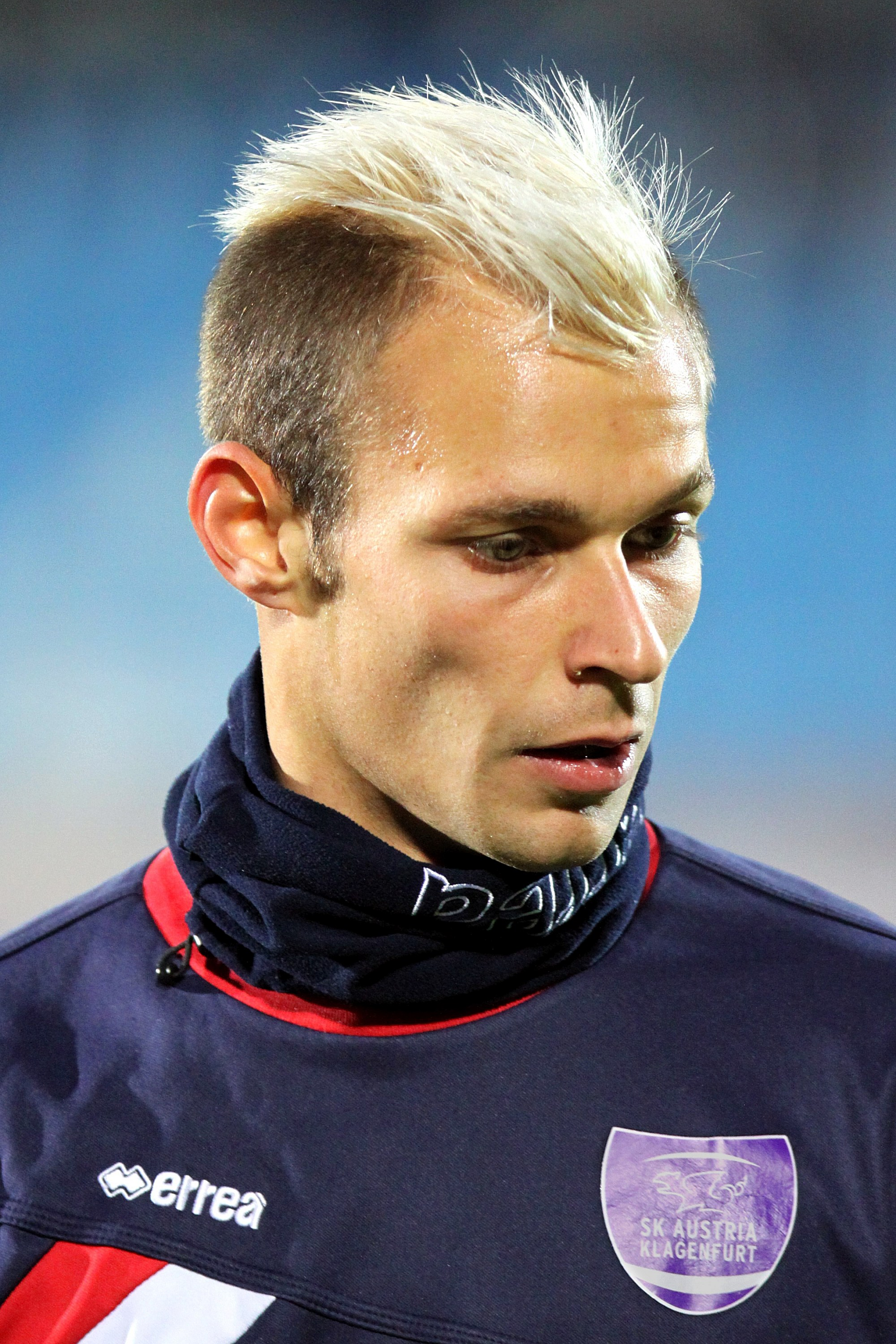
- Rep with Austria Klagenfurt in 2015

Personal information
- Date of birth: 20 June 1990 (age 36)
- Place of birth: Rogatec, SR Slovenia, SFR Yugoslavia
- Height: 1.77 m (5 ft 10 in)
- Position: Midfielder

Team information
- Current team: SU Rebenland
- Number: 9

Youth career
- 1996–2004: Mons Claudius
- 2004–2008: Celje

Senior career*
Years	Team	Apps	(Gls)
2008–2010	Celje	44	(6)
2008–2009	→ MU Šentjur (loan)	7	(3)
2010–2013	Maribor	32	(2)
2011–2012	→ Mura 05 (loan)	23	(3)
2013	→ Mura 05 (loan)	11	(1)
2014–2016	Austria Klagenfurt	70	(27)
2016–2018	LASK	46	(6)
2018–2021	TSV Hartberg	89	(22)
2021	Sepsi OSK	3	(1)
2022	Austria Klagenfurt	7	(0)
2022–2024	Bruk-Bet Termalica	14	(1)
2024–2025	SV Oberwart	30	(7)
2025–2026	SV Wildon	14	(1)
2026–	SU Rebenland	17	(13)

International career
2006–2007	Slovenia U17	5	(0)
2007–2008	Slovenia U18	7	(1)
2008–2009	Slovenia U19	12	(6)
2009	Slovenia U20	1	(0)
2009–2012	Slovenia U21	18	(2)
2019–2020	Slovenia	5	(1)
- * Club domestic league appearances and goals as of 6 October 2026

Rajko Rep (born 20 June 1990) is a Slovenian professional footballer who plays as a midfielder for Austrian club SU Rebenland.

== Club career ==
Rep started his career at Mons Claudius from Rogatec and was then transferred to Celje youth sides, where he signed his first professional contract. For a short period of time he also played for MU Šentjur on loan. He was named a team captain during his time in Celje at the age of 19 and was the youngest captain in the history of the club.

In late August 2010 he signed a four-year contract with Maribor. In August 2011, he was loaned to Mura 05 until the end of the 2011–12 Slovenian PrvaLiga season.

In January 2024, he left Polish second division side Bruk-Bet Termalica for third tier Austrian club SV Oberwart.

== International career ==
Rep played for Slovenia under-19 through qualifications for the 2009 UEFA European Under-19 Championship where he scored five out of six Slovenia goals in the final phase of qualifications, including a hat-trick against Russia. He also scored against the Netherlands and Belarus.

He made his debut for the senior team on 19 November 2019 in a Euro 2020 qualifier against Poland. He substituted Benjamin Verbič in the 86th minute.

== Personal life ==
Rep was born in Rogatec and started to play football at a local club when he was six years old. He is a declared NK Maribor supporter as he started to support the team during 1999 when the club was playing in the group stages of the UEFA Champions League.

== Career statistics ==
=== International ===
Appearances and goals by national team and year
National team	Year	Apps	Goals
Slovenia
Slovenia	2019	1	0
Slovenia	2020	4	1
Total		5	1

Scores and results list Slovenia's goal tally first, score column indicates score after each Rep goal.

List of international goals scored by Rajko Rep
No.	Date	Venue	Opponent	Score	Result	Competition
1	7 October 2020	Stožice Stadium, Ljubljana, Slovenia	San Marino	4–0	4–0	Friendly

== Honours ==
Maribor

- Slovenian PrvaLiga: 2010–11
- Slovenian Supercup: 2012, 2013

Austria Klagenfurt

- Regionalliga Mitte: 2014–15

LASK Linz

- Erste Liga: 2016–17
