= Jürgen Lemmerer =

Austrian association footballer

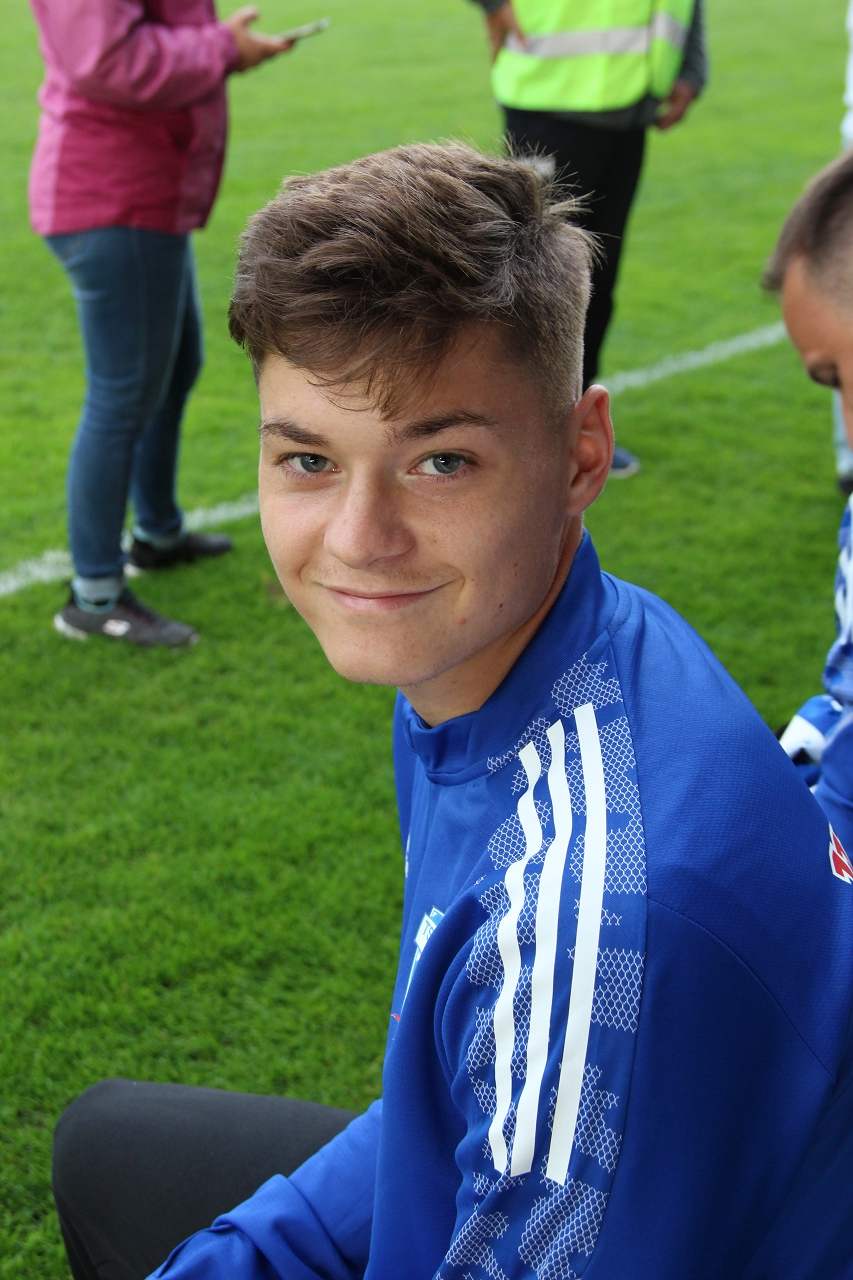
- Lemmerer in 2021

Personal information
- Date of birth: 6 March 2003 (age 23)
- Place of birth: Austria
- Position: Forward

Team information
- Current team: SKU Amstetten
- Number: 9

Youth career
- 2008–2016: WSV Liezen
- 2016–2019: Sturm Graz
- 2019–2021: Mattersburg

Senior career*
Years	Team	Apps	(Gls)
2021–	Hartberg II	24	(23)
2021–	Hartberg	15	(0)
2022–2023	→ Lafnitz (loan)	5	(0)
2024–	→ SKU Amstetten (loan)	13	(2)

International career^{‡}
2017–2018	Austria U15	3	(5)
2018	Austria U16	2	(0)
- * Club domestic league appearances and goals as of 26 May 2024 ‡ National team caps and goals as of 07:00, 25 October 2023 (UTC)

Jürgen Lemmerer (born 6 March 2003) is an Austrian professional footballer who plays as a forward for SKU Amstetten on loan from TSV Hartberg.

== Career ==
Lemmerer is a youth product of WSV Liezen, Sturm Graz, SV Burgenland and Mattersburg. On 13 July 2021, he transferred to Hartberg signing a contract until 2023. He made his professional debut with Hartberg as a substitute in a 2–0 league loss to Austria Klagenfurt on 6 November 2021. On 12 May 2022, he extended his contract with Hartberg until 2025. On 16 August 2022, he joined Lafnitz on loan for the 2022–23 season. On 6 February 2023, he returned prematurely from his loan and returned to Hartberg's reserves.

On 23 January 2024, Lemmerer was loaned to SKU Amstetten.

== International career ==
Lemmerer is a youth international for Austria, having been called up to the Austria U15s in 2017.
