= Thomas Jackel =

Austrian footballer (born 1995)

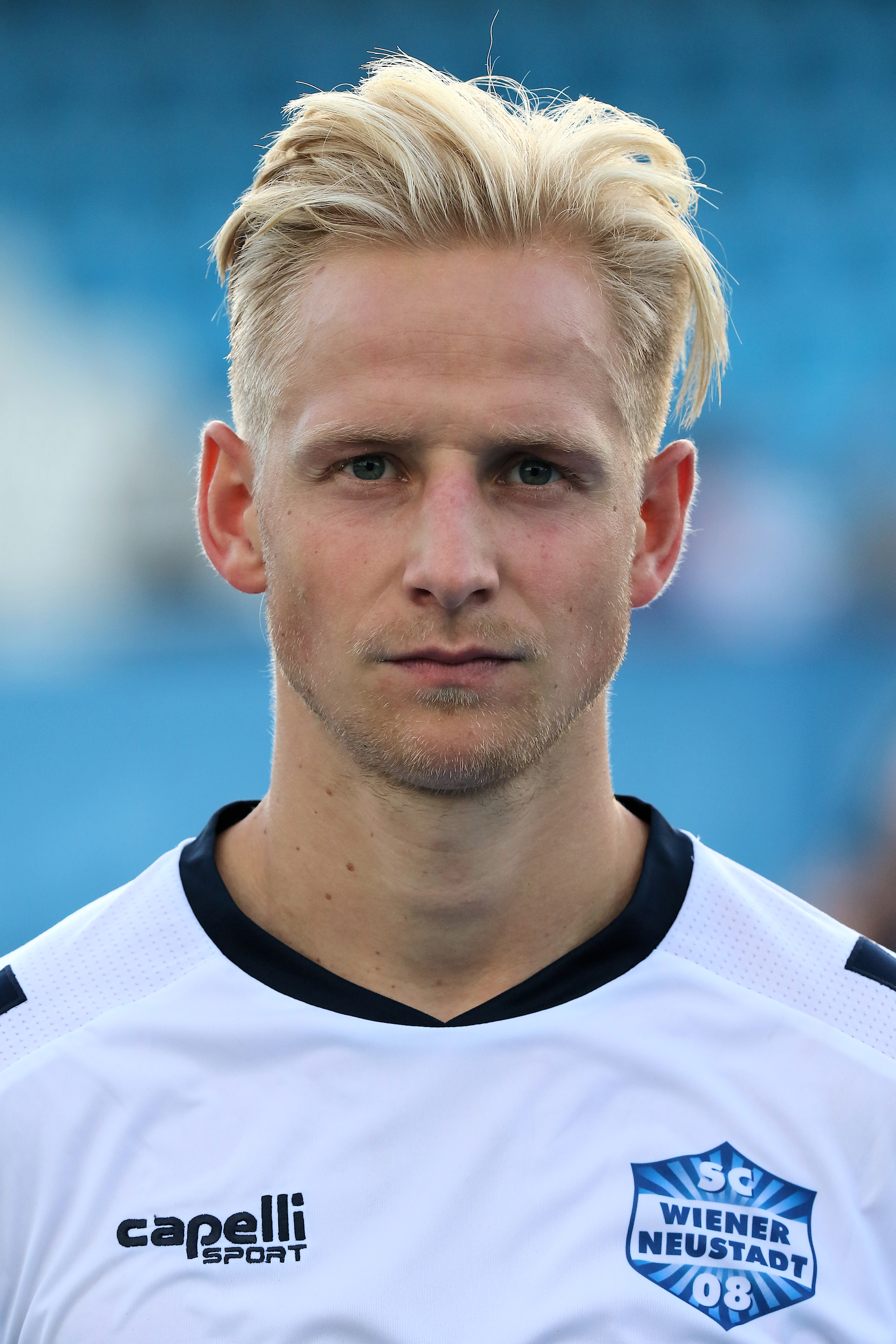
- Championship game of the Regionalliga Ost 2019/20 SC Wiener Neustdat against SV Stripfing, on 17 August 2019

Personal information
- Date of birth: 6 April 1995 (age 31)
- Place of birth: Austria
- Height: 1.85 m (6 ft 1 in)
- Position: Right-back

Team information
- Current team: SC Cover-Direct
- Number: 9

Youth career
- –2007: TuS Kremsmünster
- 2007–2013: AKA Linz

Senior career*
Years	Team	Apps	(Gls)
2013–2015	St. Florian	52	(2)
2015–2019	Blau-Weiß Linz	60	(5)
2019–2020	Wiener Neustadt	18	(1)
2020–2022	Wiener SC	15	(1)
2022–2023	Korneuburg	19	(6)
2023–2024	SV Stockerau	29	(13)
2025–	SC Cover-Direct	4	(5)

Managerial career
- 2021–2022: Wiener SC (player-assistant)
- * Club domestic league appearances and goals as of 19:34, 12 October 2025 (UTC)

Thomas Jackel (born 6 April 1995) is an Austrian football player. He plays for SC Cover-Direct.

== Club career ==
He made his Austrian Football First League debut for FC Blau-Weiß Linz on 22 July 2016 in a game against WSG Wattens.
