= Seifedin Chabbi =

Austrian footballer (born 1993)

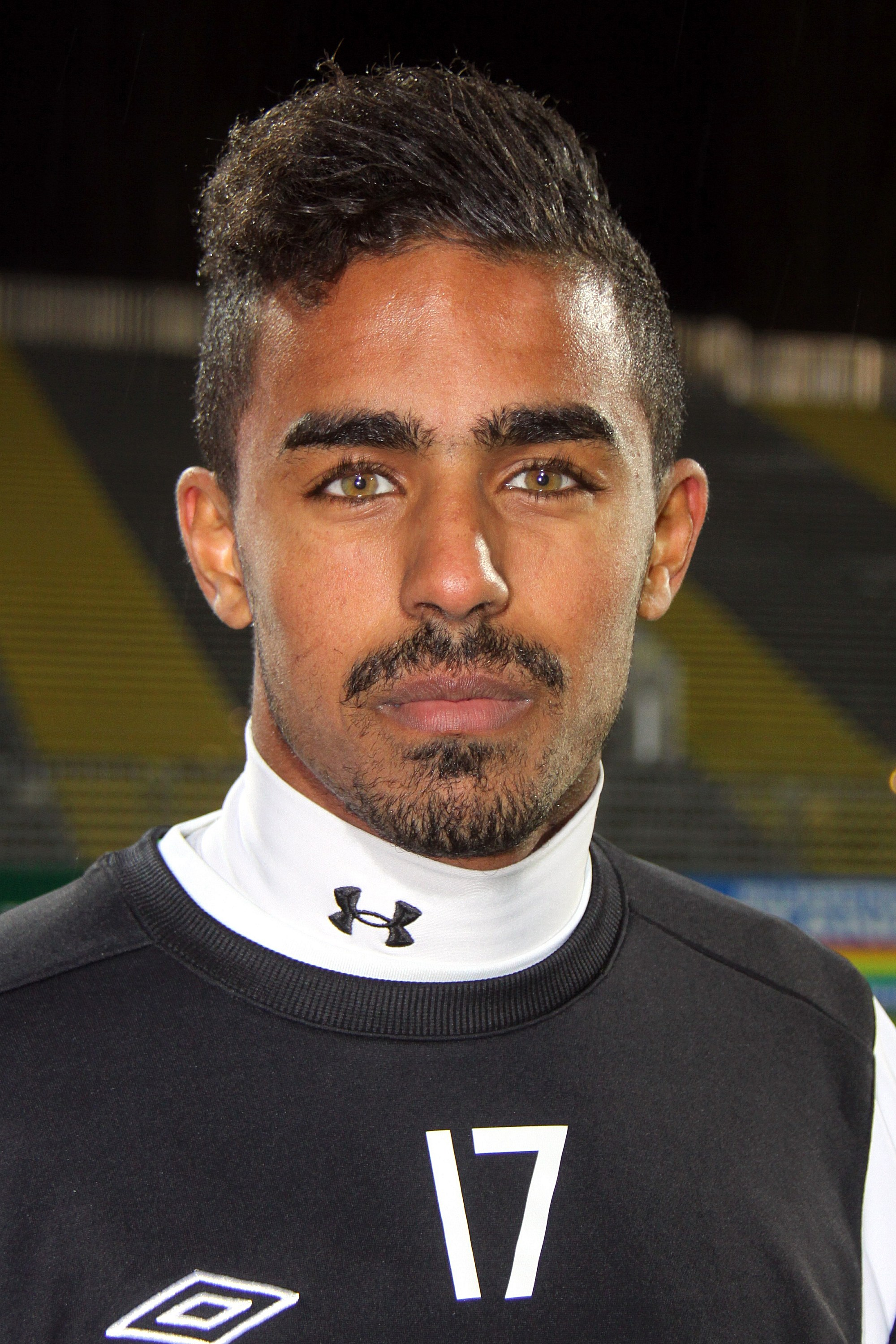
- Chabbi with Austria Lustenau in 2013

Personal information
- Date of birth: 4 July 1993 (age 33)
- Place of birth: Bludenz, Austria
- Height: 1.89 m (6 ft 2 in)
- Position: Forward

Team information
- Current team: Austria Lustenau (forward coach)

Senior career*
Years	Team	Apps	(Gls)
2011–2013	TSG 1899 Hoffenheim II	29	(5)
2013–2016	Austria Lustenau II	18	(11)
2013–2016	Austria Lustenau	77	(22)
2016–2017	St. Gallen	6	(1)
2017	Sturm Graz	7	(0)
2017–2018	SV Ried	33	(22)
2018–2020	Gazişehir Gaziantep	15	(5)
2020	→ St Mirren (loan)	2	(0)
2020–2021	TSV Hartberg	24	(5)
2021–2023	SV Ried	48	(11)
2023–2024	Vaduz	23	(6)
2024–2025	Austria Lustenau	25	(3)

International career
2008	Austria U16	2	(0)
2010	Austria U17	2	(0)
2011	Austria U19	3	(0)

Managerial career
- 2024–2025: Austria Lustenau (youth)
- 2025–2026: Austria Lustenau (assistant)
- 2026–: Austria Lustenau (forward coach)
- * Club domestic league appearances and goals

Seifedin Chabbi (born 4 July 1993) is an Austrian professional football coach and a former forward. He works as a forward coach for Austria Lustenau.

== Club career ==
In February 2020, he joined St Mirren on loan. Despite only making two substitute appearances before the season was cut short due to the COVID-19 pandemic, Chabbi gained a cult following from the fans, with the supporters podcast dubbing him ‘Big Chebs’.

On 16 October 2020, he signed with TSV Hartberg.

On 8 June 2021, he returned to SV Ried on a two-year contract.

On 5 July 2023, Chabbi moved to Vaduz in Swiss Challenge League on a two-year deal.

On 31 July 2024, Chabbi returned to Austria Lustenau.

== Personal life ==
Chabbi is the son of the Tunisian football manager Lassaad Chabbi.

== Honours ==
Austria Lustenau

- Austrian First League runner-up: 2013–14
