= Markus Rusek =

Austrian footballer

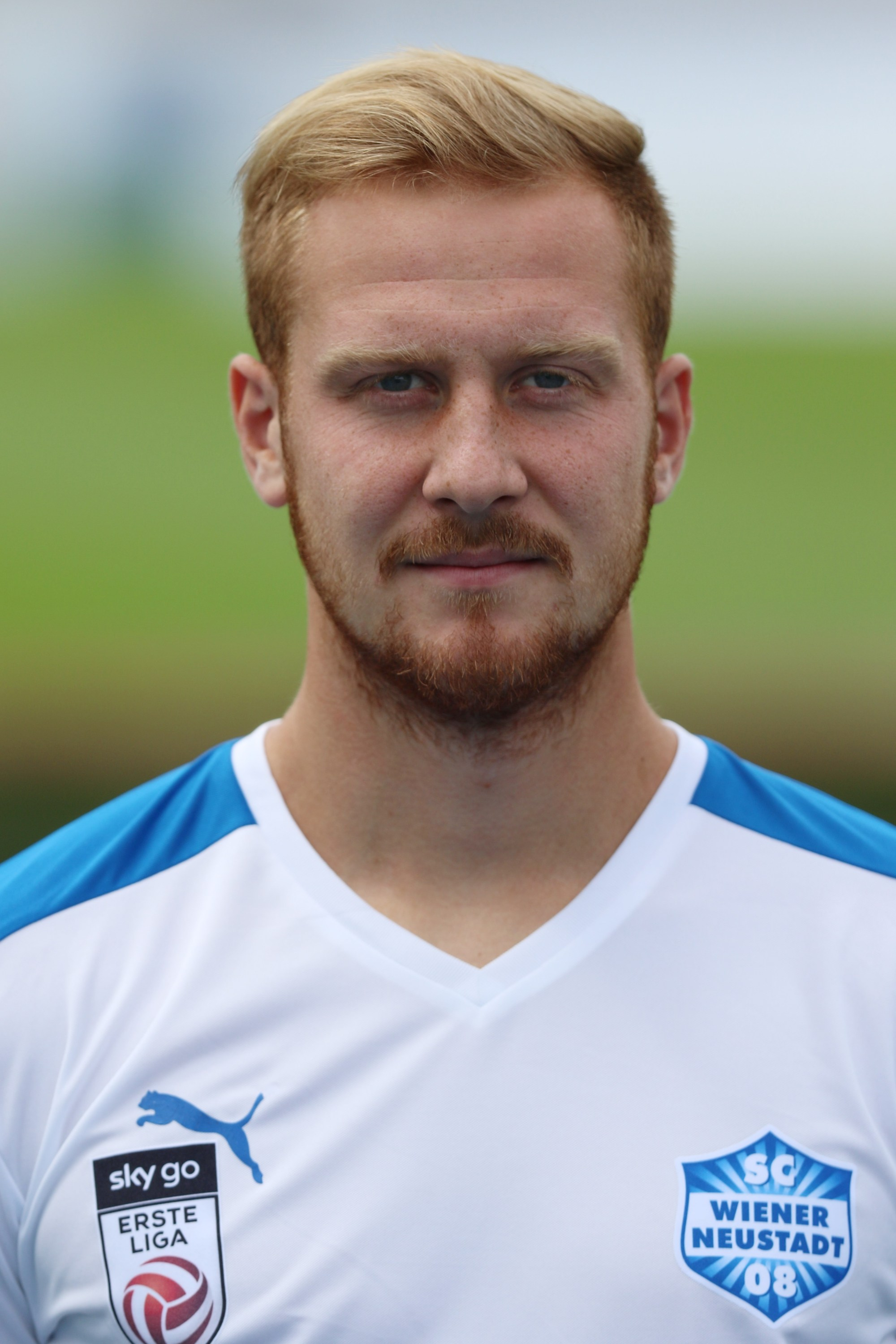

Personal information
- Date of birth: 23 December 1993 (age 32)
- Place of birth: Vienna, Austria
- Height: 1.78 m (5 ft 10 in)
- Position: Midfielder

Team information
- Current team: Wiener Neustädter

Senior career*
Years	Team	Apps	(Gls)
2011–2016	Admira Wacker II	50	(7)
2012–2016	Admira Wacker	15	(0)
2014–2015	→ SV Horn (loan)	32	(1)
2015–2016	→ SC Wiener Neustadt (loan)	21	(0)
2016–2018	SC Wiener Neustadt	61	(8)
2018–2021	Austria Klagenfurt	80	(9)
2021–2025	Grazer AK	71	(13)
2025–2026	First Vienna	2	(0)
2026–	Wiener Neustädter	0	(0)
- * Club domestic league appearances and goals as of 31 May 2026

Markus Rusek (born 23 December 1993) is an Austrian professional footballer who plays for First Vienna.

== Club career ==
On 13 May 2021, he reached agreement on a transfer to Grazer AK.

On 9 January 2025, Rusek signed a 1.5-year contract with First Vienna.
