= Tobias Kainz =

Austrian footballer

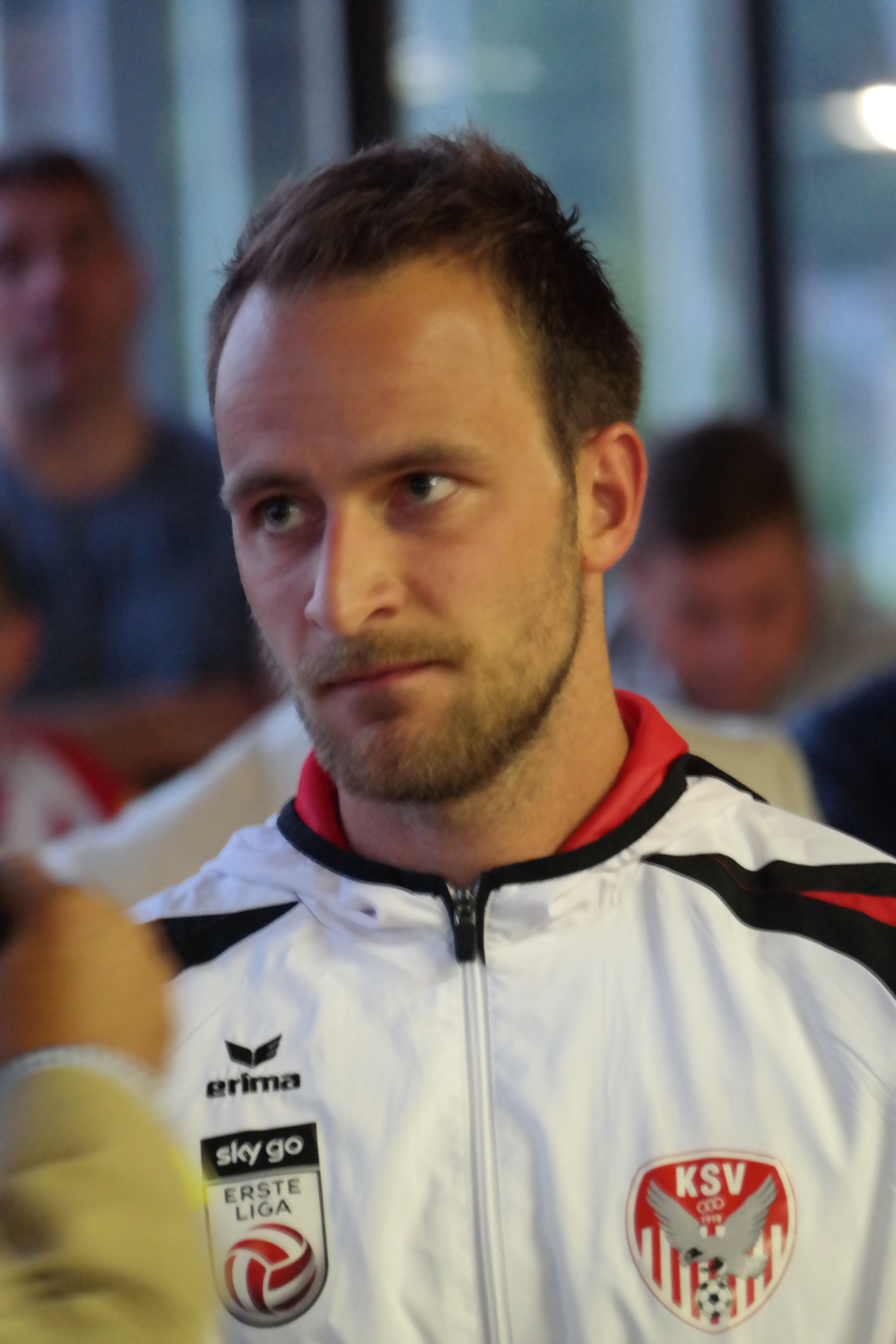

Personal information
- Date of birth: 31 October 1992 (age 34)
- Place of birth: Feldbach, Austria
- Height: 1.74 m (5 ft 9 in)
- Position: Midfielder

Team information
- Current team: TSV Hartberg
- Number: 23

Youth career
- Sturm Graz
- Austria Wien
- 2008–2011: SC Heerenveen

Senior career*
Years	Team	Apps	(Gls)
2011–2012	SC Heerenveen	1	(0)
2012–2014	Sturm Graz	33	(0)
2014	Sturm Graz B	3	(0)
2014–2015	Wiener Neustadt	26	(2)
2015–2016	SV Grödig	28	(3)
2017	Limerick	0	(0)
2017–2018	Kapfenberger SV	34	(1)
2018–	TSV Hartberg	239	(10)

International career
2007	Austria U16	1	(0)
2008–2009	Austria U17	16	(1)
2010	Austria U18	1	(0)
2009–2010	Austria U19	13	(0)
2011	Austria U20	3	(0)
2012–2014	Austria U21	11	(1)
- * Club domestic league appearances and goals as of 10 June 2026

Tobias Kainz (born 31 October 1992) is an Austrian professional footballer who plays as a midfielder for Austrian Bundesliga club TSV Hartberg.
