= Matija Horvat =

Croatian footballer (born 1999)

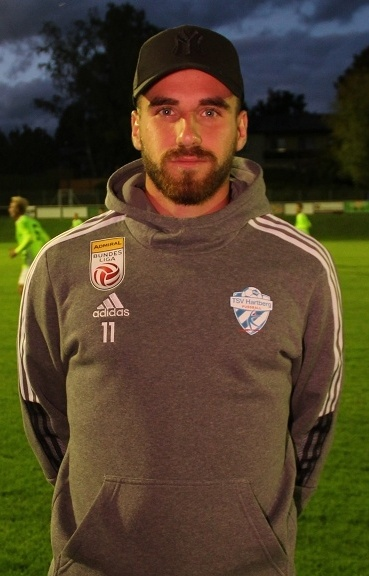
- Horvat in 2021

Personal information
- Date of birth: 7 May 1999 (age 27)
- Place of birth: Čakovec, Croatia
- Height: 1.80 m (5 ft 11 in)
- Position: Midfielder

Team information
- Current team: GKS Tychy
- Number: 5

Youth career
- 2006–2013: DSV Leoben
- 2013–2016: Kapfenberger SV

Senior career*
| Years | Team | Apps | (Gls) |
| 2015–2021 | Kapfenberger SV II | 62 | (1) |
| 2016–2021 | Kapfenberger SV | 65 | (1) |
| 2021–2023 | TSV Hartberg | 68 | (3) |
| 2023–2024 | DSV Leoben | 28 | (2) |
| 2024–2026 | Admira Wacker | 51 | (4) |
| 2026– | GKS Tychy | 0 | (0) |
- * Club domestic league appearances and goals as of 17 May 2026

Matija Horvat (born 7 May 1999) is a Croatian professional footballer who plays as a midfielder for II liga club GKS Tychy.

== Club career ==
On 29 January 2021, Horvat signed an eighteen-month contract with TSV Hartberg.

On 4 July 2024, he moved to Admira Wacker.

On 20 June 2026, Horvat signed a one-year contract with Polish third tier club GKS Tychy.

== Career statistics ==
As of match played 14 May 2026

Appearances and goals by club, season and competition
| Club | Season | League | | | National cup (Note: Includes Austrian Cup) | | Continental | | Other | | Total | |
| Club | Season | Division | Apps | Goals | Apps | Goals | Apps | Goals | Apps | Goals | Apps | Goals |
|---|---|---|---|---|---|---|---|---|---|---|---|---|
| Kapfenberger SV II | 2015–16 | Landesliga Steiermark | 8 | 0 | 0 | 0 | — | | — | | 8 | 0 |
| Kapfenberger SV II | 2016–17 | Landesliga Steiermark | 30 | 0 | 0 | 0 | — | | — | | 30 | 0 |
| Kapfenberger SV II | 2017–18 | Landesliga Steiermark | 24 | 1 | 0 | 0 | — | | — | | 24 | 1 |
| Kapfenberger SV II | Total | | 62 | 1 | 0 | 0 | — | | — | | 62 | 1 |
| Kapfenberger SV | 2016–17 | Erste Liga | 0 | 0 | 1 | 0 | — | | — | | 1 | 0 |
| Kapfenberger SV | 2017–18 | Erste Liga | 6 | 0 | 0 | 0 | — | | — | | 6 | 0 |
| Kapfenberger SV | 2018–19 | 2. Liga | 24 | 0 | 2 | 0 | — | | — | | 26 | 0 |
| Kapfenberger SV | 2019–20 | 2. Liga | 23 | 0 | 2 | 0 | — | | — | | 25 | 0 |
| Kapfenberger SV | 2020–21 | 2. Liga | 12 | 1 | 2 | 0 | — | | — | | 14 | 1 |
| Kapfenberger SV | Total | | 65 | 1 | 7 | 0 | — | | — | | 72 | 1 |
| TSV Hartberg | 2020–21 | Bundesliga | 17 | 0 | — | | — | | — | | 17 | 0 |
| TSV Hartberg | 2021–22 | Bundesliga | 27 | 2 | 2 | 0 | — | | — | | 29 | 2 |
| TSV Hartberg | 2022–23 | Bundesliga | 24 | 1 | 1 | 0 | — | | — | | 25 | 1 |
| TSV Hartberg | Total | | 68 | 3 | 3 | 0 | — | | — | | 71 | 3 |
| DSV Leoben | 2023–24 | 2. Liga | 28 | 2 | 4 | 0 | — | | — | | 32 | 2 |
| Admira Wacker | 2024–25 | 2. Liga | 29 | 2 | 1 | 0 | — | | — | | 30 | 2 |
| Admira Wacker | 2025–26 | 2. Liga | 22 | 2 | 0 | 0 | — | | — | | 22 | 2 |
| Admira Wacker | Total | | 51 | 4 | 1 | 0 | — | | — | | 52 | 4 |
| GKS Tychy | 2026–27 | II liga | 0 | 0 | 0 | 0 | — | | — | | 0 | 0 |
| Career total | | | 274 | 11 | 15 | 0 | 0 | 0 | 0 | 0 | 289 | 11 |
