= Thomas Rotter =

Austrian footballer

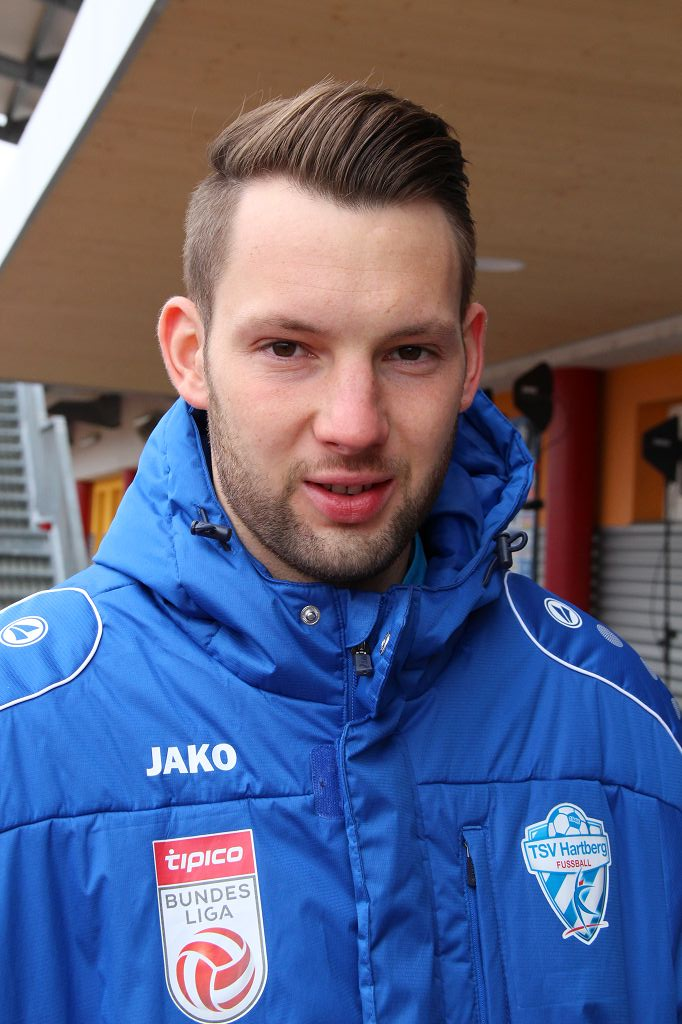
- Rotter with Hartberg in 2019

Personal information
- Date of birth: 27 January 1992 (age 34)
- Height: 1.88 m (6 ft 2 in)
- Position: Centre-back

Team information
- Current team: TSV Hartberg II

Youth career
- 1999–2007: TSV Hartberg

Senior career*
Years	Team	Apps	(Gls)
2007–2014	TSV Hartberg II		
2011–2024	TSV Hartberg	195	(21)
2023–	TSV Hartberg II	26	(3)
- * Club domestic league appearances and goals as of 10 November 2024

Thomas Rotter (born 27 January 1992) is an Austrian professional footballer who plays as a centre-back for Landesliga Steiermark club TSV Hartberg II.

== Club career ==
He made his Austrian Football First League debut for TSV Hartberg on 28 September 2012 in a game against SC Austria Lustenau.
