= Manfred Gollner =

Austrian footballer

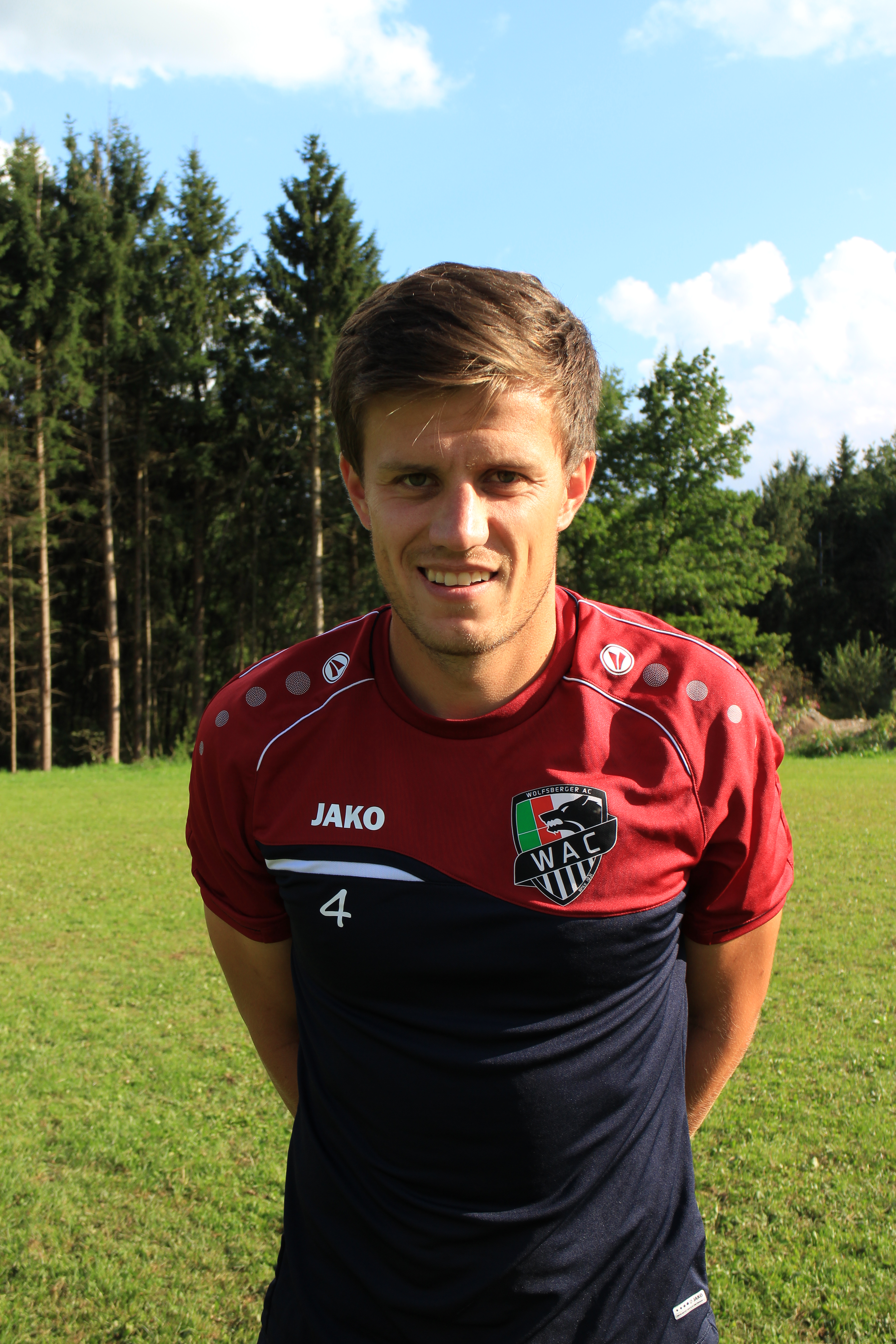
- Gollner in September 2018

Personal information
- Date of birth: 22 December 1990 (age 35)
- Place of birth: Judenburg, Austria
- Height: 1.84 m (6 ft 0 in)
- Position: Defender

Team information
- Current team: FC Obdach

Youth career
- 1997–2005: FC Obdach
- 2005–2008: Kapfenberger SV

Senior career*
Years	Team	Apps	(Gls)
2010–2016	Kapfenberger SV	135	(6)
2016–2018	TSV Hartberg	60	(4)
2018–2020	Wolfsberger AC	39	(3)
2020–2024	TSV Hartberg	64	(4)
2024–	FC Obdach		
- * Club domestic league appearances and goals as of 19 May 2024

Manfred Gollner (born 22 December 1990) is an Austrian professional footballer who plays as a centre-back for an amateur side FC Obdach.

== Club career ==
On 27 July 2020 he returned to TSV Hartberg.
