= 2022–23 SV Ried season =

111th season in existence of SV Ried

SV Ried
2022–23 season
- Chairman: Johann Willminger
- Manager: Christian Heinle (until 1 March 2023); Maximilian Senft (from 1 March)
- Stadium: Josko Arena
- Austrian Bundesliga: 12th (relegated)
- Austrian Cup: Semi-finals
- Top goalscorer: League: Tin Plavotić (4); Seifedin Chabbi (4); All: Christoph Monschein (6)
- Highest home attendance: 7,300 v Rheindorf Altach (19 May 2023)
- Lowest home attendance: 2,630 v Wolfsberger AC (2 June 2023)
- Average home league attendance: 4,237
- Biggest win: 4–0 vs FC Stadlau (A), 16 July 2022, Austrian Cup
- Biggest defeat: 3–0 vs Red Bull Salzburg (H), 10 September 2022, Austrian Bundesliga; 3–0 vs Austria Wien (A), 18 September 2022, Austrian Bundesliga
- All statistics correct as of 2 December 2023.

The 2022–23 season was the 111th in the history of SV Ried and their third consecutive season in the top flight. The club participated in the Austrian Bundesliga and the Austrian Cup.

== Players ==
=== First team squad ===
As of 9 July 2022

Note: Flags indicate national team as defined under FIFA eligibility rules; some limited exceptions apply. Players may hold more than one non-FIFA nationality.

No.	Pos.	Nation	Player
1	GK	AUT	Samuel Şahin-Radlinger
4	MF	AUT	Marcel Ziegl (captain)
6	DF	AUT	Markus Lackner
7	FW	AUT	Christoph Monschein
8	MF	GER	Michael Martin
9	FW	AUT	Seifedin Chabbi
10	MF	GER	Julian Wießmeier
11	MF	AUT	Denizcan Cosgun
14	FW	BIH	Belmin Beganović
15	MF	AUT	Matthias Gragger
17	MF	AUT	Philipp Pomer
18	FW	GER	Robin Ungerath
19	DF	AUT	Julian Turi

No.	Pos.	Nation	Player
20	DF	AUT	Philipp Birglehner
21	FW	CRO	Leo Mikić
22	MF	AUT	Stefan Nutz
23	DF	AUT	Josef Weberbauer
24	DF	CRO	Tin Plavotić
25	DF	AUT	Felix Seiwald
30	DF	SRB	Miloš Jovičić
33	GK	AUT	Jonas Wendlinger
36	GK	AUT	Patrick Moser
37	MF	SRB	Nikola Stošić
44	DF	AUT	Nico Wiesinger
55	MF	AUT	David Ungar

=== Out on loan ===
Note: Flags indicate national team as defined under FIFA eligibility rules; some limited exceptions apply. Players may hold more than one non-FIFA nationality.

No. / Pos. / Nation / Player; — / GK / AUT / Lukas Gütlbauer (at Vorwärts Steyr)	No. / Pos. / Nation / Player; — / MF / AUT / Nicolas Zdichynec (at Vorwärts Steyr)

== Pre-season and friendlies ==
Win Draw Loss Fixtures

18 June 2022 Friendly	Ried (Austria)	0–3	(Slovakia) Slovan Bratislava	Grieskirchen
17:30 CEST (UTC+2)			Zmrhal 55'; Križan 65'; Dražić 82'	Stadium: Fröling-Stadion

24 June 2022 Friendly	Ried (Austria)	2–0	(Greece) Olympiacos	Peuerbach
18:00 CEST (UTC+2)	Monschein 55' (pen.); Nutz 68'; Stošić (yellow card) 88'		Cissé (yellow card) 88'	Stadium: Guntamatic Arena

8 July 2022 Friendly	Ried (Austria)	0–1	(Austria) Horn	Ried im Innkreis
14:30 CEST (UTC+2)				Stadium: Stadion Ried - Alt Kunstrasen

8 July 2022 Friendly	Ried (Austria)	2–4	(Hungary) Újpest	Ried im Innkreis
18:00 CEST (UTC+2)				Stadium: Josko Arena

== Competitions ==
=== Overall record ===
Competition	First match	Last match	Starting round	Record							
Competition	First match	Last match	Starting round	Pld	W	D	L	GF	GA	GD	Win %
Austrian Football Bundesliga	24 July 2022		Matchday 1	3	1	1	1	2	2	+0	33.33
Austrian Cup	16 July 2022		First round	1	1	0	0	4	0	+4	100.00
Total				4	2	1	1	6	2	+4	50.00

Last updated: 6 August 2022
Source: Soccerway

=== Austrian Football Bundesliga ===
==== League table ====
Pos	Team	Pld	W	D	L	GF	GA	GD	Pts	Qualification
8	Austria Lustenau	22	7	6	9	29	37	−8	27	Qualification for the Relegation round
9	Wolfsberger AC	22	6	3	13	35	41	−6	21	Qualification for the Relegation round
10	Hartberg	22	5	3	14	22	42	−20	18	Qualification for the Relegation round
11	SV Ried	22	4	6	12	16	32	−16	18	Qualification for the Relegation round
12	Rheindorf Altach	22	4	5	13	22	44	−22	17	Qualification for the Relegation round

Source: Austrian Football Bundesliga
Rules for classification: 1) Points; 2) Head-to-head record; 3) Goal difference; 4) Goals scored; 5) Matches won; 6) Away matches won; 7) Away goals scored.

Pos	Team	Pld	W	D	L	GF	GA	GD	Pts	Qualification	RBS	STU	LIN	RWI	AWI	KLA
1	Red Bull Salzburg (C)	32	23	8	1	67	22	+45	49	Qualification for the Champions League group stage	—	2–1	0–0	2–1	3–3	3–2
2	Sturm Graz	32	20	6	6	57	29	+28	42	Qualification for the Champions League third qualifying round	0–2	—	2–0	3–1	3–2	4–1
3	LASK	32	14	12	6	54	38	+16	35	Qualification for the Europa League play-off round	0–1	2–1	—	3–1	3–1	4–0
4	Rapid Wien	32	12	6	14	50	47	+3	25	Qualification for the Europa Conference League third qualifying round	1–1	3–2	1–1	—	3–3	3–1
5	Austria Wien (O)	32	11	10	11	55	52	+3	24	Qualification for the Europa Conference League play-offs	1–1	1–2	2–2	3–1	—	1–2
6	Austria Klagenfurt	32	11	5	16	45	63	−18	23		0–3	0–2	1–1	2–1	1–1	—

Source: Austrian Football Bundesliga
Legend: Blue = home team win; Yellow = draw; Red = away team win.
Rules for classification: 1) Points; 2) Points with (possible) half points subtracted due to rounding; 3) Head-to-head points; 4) Head-to-head goal difference; 5) Head-to-head goals scored; 6) Head-to-head away goals scored; 7) Goal difference; 8) Goals scored; 9) Matches won; 10) Away matches won; 11) Away goals scored.
(C) Champions; (O) Play-off winners

Pos	Team	Pld	W	D	L	GF	GA	GD	Pts	Qualification	WOL	LUS	WAT	HAR	ALT	RIE
1	Wolfsberger AC	32	12	6	14	51	51	0	31	Qualification for the Europa Conference League play-offs	—	2–2	2–0	2–2	0–0	1–0
2	Austria Lustenau	32	11	10	11	50	54	−4	29	Qualification for the Europa Conference League play-offs	1–3	—	2–4	5–1	1–0	2–2
3	WSG Tirol	32	10	8	14	44	53	−9	24		4–0	0–2	—	1–1	1–1	1–1
4	Hartberg	32	9	6	17	39	56	−17	24		0–2	0–1	5–0	—	2–2	2–0
5	Rheindorf Altach	32	6	10	16	29	53	−24	19		0–2	1–1	1–0	0–1	—	1–1
6	Ried (R)	32	4	11	17	27	50	−23	14	Relegation to Austrian Football Second League	1–2	4–4	1–1	1–3	0–1	—

Legend: Blue = home team win; Yellow = draw; Red = away team win.
Rules for classification: 1) Points; 2) Points with (possible) half points subtracted due to rounding; 3) Head-to-head points; 4) Head-to-head goal difference; 5) Head-to-head goals scored; 6) Head-to-head away goals scored; 7) Goal difference; 8) Goals scored; 9) Matches won; 10) Away matches won; 11) Away goals scored.
(R) Relegated

==== Results summary ====
Overall								Home						Away					
Pld	W	D	L	GF	GA	GD	Pts	W	D	L	GF	GA	GD	W	D	L	GF	GA	GD
3	1	1	1	2	2	0	4	1	1	0	2	1	+1	0	0	1	0	1	−1

Last updated: 6 August 2022.
Source: Austrian Football Bundesliga

==== Results by round ====
Round	1	2	3	4
Ground	A	H	H	A
Result	L	W	D	
Position				

Updated to match(es) played on 6 August 2022. Source: Austrian Football Bundesliga
A = Away; H = Home; W = Win; D = Draw; L = Loss

==== Matches ====
The league fixtures were announced on 22 June 2022.

24 July 2022 1	Rapid Wien	1–0	Ried	Vienna
17:00 CEST (UTC+2)	Zimmermann 20'	Report		Stadium: Allianz Stadion; Referee: Walter Altmann

30 July 2022 2	Ried	1–0	Austria Lustenau	Ried im Innkreis
17:00 CEST (UTC+2)	Wießmeier 20'	Report		Stadium: Josko Arena; Referee: Sebastian Gishamer

6 August 2022 3	Ried	1–1	Sturm Graz	Ried im Innkreis
17:00 CEST (UTC+2)	Monschein 78' (pen.)	Report	Lang 11'	Stadium: Josko Arena; Referee: Josef Spurny

13 August 2022 4	Austria Klagenfurt	1–0	Ried	Klagenfurt
17:00 CEST (UTC+2)	Gezos (yellow card) 46'; Arweiler 73'; Cvetko (yellow card) 77'	Report	Lackner (yellow card) 47' (yellow-red card) 55'; David Ungar (yellow card) 75'; Nutz (yellow card) 90+3'	Stadium: Wörthersee Stadion; Attendance: 4,492; Referee: (Austria) Julian Weinberger

21 August 2022 5	Ried	1–2	WSG Tirol	Ried im Innkreis
17:00 CEST (UTC+2)	Plavotić 33'	Report	Ogrinec 48'; Rogelj 85'	Stadium: Josko Arena; Attendance: 4,392; Referee: Gerhard Grobelnik

27 August 2022 6	TSV Hartberg	2–0	Ried	Hartberg
17:00 CEST (UTC+2)	Almog 62'; Tadić 90+1'	Report	Plavotić (yellow card) 24' (yellow-red card) 68'	Stadium: Profertil Arena Hartberg; Attendance: 1,619; Referee: (Austria) Alan Kijas

4 September 2022 7	LASK	1–1	Ried	Linz
17:00 CEST (UTC+2)	Ljubičić (red card) 10'; Nakamura 45+2'; Michorl (yellow card) 90+5'	Report	Michael Martin (yellow card) 58'; David Ungar (red card) 65'; Mikić (yellow card) 73'; Pomer 77'; Ziegl (yellow card) 81'; Kronberger (yellow card) 87'	Stadium: Raiffeisen Arena; Attendance: 5,575; Referee: (Austria) Alexander Harkam

10 September 2022 8	Ried	0–3	Red Bull Salzburg	Ried im Innkreis
16:00 CEST (UTC+2)	Mikić (red card) 42'; Kronberger (yellow card) 82'	Report	Šeško 5'; Adamu 15', (yellow card) 45+2' (yellow-red card) 54'; Okafor 71'	Stadium: Josko Arena; Attendance: 5,568; Referee: (Austria) Markus Hameter

18 September 2022 9	Austria Wien	3–0	Ried	Vienna
14:30 CEST (UTC+2)	Gruber 27'; Fitz 47'; Keleş 68'	Report		Stadium: Generali Arena; Attendance: 8,779; Referee: (Austria) Christopher Jäger

2 October 2022 10	Ried	2–3	Rheindorf Altach	Ried im Innkreis
14:30 CEST (UTC+2)	Mikić 8'; Pomer 24'	Report	Nuhiu 4'; Tibidi 53'; Tartarotti 70'	Stadium: Josko Arena; Attendance: 3,803; Referee: (Austria) Gerhard Grobelnik

9 October 2022 11	Wolfsberger AC	1–2	Ried	Wolfsberg
14:30 CEST (UTC+2)	Matthias Gragger 90+1' (o.g.)	Report	Mikić 17'; Plavotić 33'	Stadium: Lavanttal-Arena; Attendance: 2,661; Referee: (Austria) Christian-Petru Ciochirca

15 October 2022 12	Ried	1–0	Rapid Wien	Ried im Innkreis
17:00 CEST (UTC+2)	Monschein 50' (pen.)	Report	(red card) 87' Querfeld	Stadium: Josko Arena; Attendance: 5,770; Referee: (Austria) Alexander Harkam

23 October 2022 13	Austria Lustenau	0–0	Ried	Lustenau
14:30 CEST (UTC+2)	Fridrikas (yellow card) 78'	Report	David Ungar (yellow card) 55'; Michael (yellow card) 90+4'	Stadium: Planet Pure Stadion; Attendance: 4,162; Referee: (Austria) Florian Jäger

30 October 2022 14	Sturm Graz	2–1	Ried	Graz
17:00 CEST (UTC+2)	Jantscher 22' (pen.); Kiteishvili 71'	Report	Nutz 59'; Michael Martin (yellow card) 90+1'	Stadium: Merkur Arena; Attendance: 15,023; Referee: (Austria) Harald Lechner

5 November 2022 15	Ried	2–2	Austria Klagenfurt	Ried im Innkreis
17:00 CEST (UTC+2)	Chabbi 30' 78' (pen.)	Report	Wernitznig (yellow card) 39'; Pink 52' 73'; Wimmer (yellow card) 76'; Mahrer (yellow card) 82'	Stadium: Josko Arena; Attendance: 4,146; Referee: (Austria) Markus Hameter

=== Austrian Cup ===
16 July 2022 First round	FC Stadlau	0–4	Ried	Vienna
17:00	Libic (red card) 12'	Report	Monschein 13', 24'; Ziegl 17'; Nutz 55'	Stadium: OMV-Sportanlage Stadlau; Attendance: 450; Referee: Alexander Harkam

31 August 2022 Second round	WSC Hertha	2–4	Ried	Wels
19:30	Ried 26', (red card) 73'; Kukic (yellow card) 35'; Luna 41'; Huber (yellow card) 48'; Hodzic (yellow card) 49'; Sulimani (yellow card) 70' (yellow-red card) 70'; Awuni (yellow card) 70'; Norenkov (yellow card) 80', (red card) postgame'; Cirkic (yellow card) 90+2'	Report	Cosgun (yellow card) 29'; Wießmeier 43', (yellow card) 90+2'; Monschein 55'; Weberbauer 77'; Mikić 90+3'	Stadium: Mauth Stadion; Attendance: 1,000; Referee: Manuel Schuttengruber

18 October 2022 Third round	SV Horn	2–3	Ried	Horn
19:30	Yilmaz 16'; Mijic 18'; Hoffmann (red card) 24'; Tomka (yellow card) 82'	Report	Chabbi 53', (yellow card) 90+3'; Nutz 68'; Mikić (yellow card) 70'; Gragger (yellow card) 75'; Kragl 90+1'	Stadium: Sparkasse Horn Arena; Attendance: 1,350; Referee: Christopher Jäger

4 February 2023 Quarter-finals	Wiener Sport-Club	0–2	Ried	Vienna
18:00	Haas (yellow card) 10'; Gusić (yellow card) 24' (yellow-red card) 52'; Dimov (yellow card) 48'; Pfaffl (yellow card) 55'; Andrejević (yellow card) 78'; Buzuk (yellow card) 90'	Report	Lang 51' (pen.); Cosgun (yellow card) 70'; Mikić 79' (Ungar)	Stadium: Sportklub Stadium; Attendance: 5,600; Referee: Walter Altmann

5 April 2023 Semi-finals	Rapid Wien	2–1	Ried	Vienna
20:30	Burgstaller 45+2' (Grüll) 83' (Greil); Pejić (yellow card) 58'; Querfeld (yellow card) 90'; Sollbauer (yellow card) 90+2'	Report	Lackner (yellow card) 26'; Kronberger (yellow card) 79'; Ziegl 90+3' (pen.)	Stadium: Allianz Stadion; Attendance: 21,600; Referee: Alexander Harkam
