= 2021–22 SV Ried season =

110th season in existence of SV Ried

SV Ried
2021–22 season
- Chairman: Johann Willminger
- Manager: Christian Heinle
- Stadium: Keine Sorgen Arena
- Austrian Bundesliga: 10th
- Austrian Cup: Runners-up
- Top goalscorer: League: Ante Bajic (9); All: Ante Bajic (10)
- Highest home attendance: 7,300 (vs LASK, 29 August 2021, Austrian Bundesliga)
- Lowest home attendance: 1,150; (vs Austria Klagenfurt, 4 February 2022, Austrian Cup)
- Average home league attendance: 4,237
- Biggest win: 7–0 (vs SV Grödig (A), 16 July 2021, Austrian Cup)
- Biggest defeat: 1–7 (vs Red Bull Salzburg (A), 1 August 2021, Austrian Bundesliga)
Home colours	Away colours

The 2021–22 season was SV Ried's 110th year in existence and second consecutive season in the top flight of Austrian football. In addition to the domestic league, Ried participated in this season's editions of the Austrian Cup. The season covered the period from 1 July 2021 to 30 June 2022.

== Players ==
=== First-team squad ===
As of 12 July 2021

Note: Flags indicate national team as defined under FIFA eligibility rules; some limited exceptions apply. Players may hold more than one non-FIFA nationality.

No.	Pos.	Nation	Player
1	GK	AUT	Samuel Şahin-Radlinger
2	DF	AUT	Luca Meisl
4	MF	AUT	Marcel Ziegl
5	DF	AUT	Michael Lercher
6	DF	AUT	Constantin Reiner
7	MF	AUT	Marcel Canadi
8	FW	BRA	Valdir
9	FW	AUT	Seifedin Chabbi
10	MF	GER	Julian Wießmeier
11	MF	AUT	Daniel Offenbacher
12	MF	AUT	Ante Bajic
13	DF	AUT	Julian Turi
16	MF	AUT	Markus Lackner

No.	Pos.	Nation	Player
17	MF	AUT	Philipp Pomer
20	MF	AUT	Murat Satin
21	FW	CRO	Leo Mikic
22	MF	AUT	Stefan Nutz
24	DF	CRO	Tin Plavotic
26	MF	AUT	Nicolas Zdichynec
29	DF	AUT	Felix Seiwald
30	DF	SRB	Miloš Jovičić
32	GK	AUT	Christoph Haas
36	GK	AUT	Patrick Moser
37	MF	SRB	Nikola Stosic
77	FW	BRA	Reinaldo

=== Out on loan ===
Note: Flags indicate national team as defined under FIFA eligibility rules; some limited exceptions apply. Players may hold more than one non-FIFA nationality.

No.	Pos.	Nation	Player
—	DF	AUT	Bojan Lugonja (at Floridsdorfer AC until 30 June 2021)

== Pre-season and friendlies ==
Win Draw Loss Fixtures

== Competitions ==
=== Overall record ===
Competition	First match	Last match	Starting round	Final position	Record							
Competition	First match	Last match	Starting round	Final position	Pld	W	D	L	GF	GA	GD	Win %
Austrian Football Bundesliga	25 July 2021	May 2022	Matchday 1		29	8	10	11	37	51	−14	27.59
Austrian Cup	16 July 2021	1 May 2022	First round	Runners-up	5	5	0	0	16	6	+10	100.00
Total					34	13	10	11	53	57	−4	38.24

Last updated: 1 May 2022
Source: Soccerway

=== Austrian Football Bundesliga ===
==== League table ====
Austrian Bundesliga regular season table
Pos	Team	Pld	W	D	L	GF	GA	GD	Pts	Qualification
5	Rapid Wien	22	8	7	7	35	31	+4	31	Qualification for the Championship round
6	Austria Klagenfurt	22	7	9	6	31	33	−2	30	Qualification for the Championship round
7	Ried	22	7	8	7	31	41	−10	29	Qualification for the Relegation round
8	LASK	22	6	7	9	28	29	−1	25	Qualification for the Relegation round
9	WSG Tirol	22	5	8	9	30	42	−12	23	Qualification for the Relegation round

Source: Austrian Football Bundesliga
Rules for classification: 1) Points; 2) Head-to-head record; 3) Goal difference; 4) Goals scored; 5) Matches won; 6) Away matches won; 7) Away goals scored.

==== Results summary ====
Overall								Home						Away					
Pld	W	D	L	GF	GA	GD	Pts	W	D	L	GF	GA	GD	W	D	L	GF	GA	GD
4	2	1	1	6	10	−4	7	2	0	0	4	2	+2	0	1	1	2	8	−6

Last updated: 14 August 2021.
Source: Austrian Football Bundesliga

==== Results by round ====
Round	1	2	3	4	5
Ground	H	A	H	A	A
Result	W	L	W	D	
Position					

Updated to match(es) played on 14 August 2021. Source: Austrian Football Bundesliga
A = Away; H = Home; W = Win; D = Draw; L = Loss

==== Matches ====
The league fixtures were announced on 22 June 2021.

25 July 2021 1	Ried	2–1	Austria Wien	Ried im Innkreis
17:00 CEST (UTC+2)				Stadium: Keine Sorgen Arena

1 August 2021 2	Red Bull Salzburg	7–1	Ried	Wals-Siezenheim
17:00 CEST (UTC+2)	Šeško (yellow card) 13', (goal) 37', 90+1'; Kristensen 41'; Adeyemi 52', 62'; Seiwald (yellow card) 72'; Ulmer 78'; Wöber (yellow card) 82'; Okafor 90+3'	Report	Pomer 89'	Stadium: Stadion Wals-Siezenheim; Attendance: 10,086; Referee: Markus Hameter

7 August 2021 3	Ried	2–1	Admira Wacker Mödling	Ried im Innkreis
17:00 CEST (UTC+2)				Stadium: Keine Sorgen Arena

14 August 2021 4	Hartberg	1–1	Ried	Hartberg
17:00 CEST (UTC+2)				Stadium: Profertil Arena Hartberg

22 August 2021 5	Rapid Wien	v	Ried	Vienna
17:00 CEST (UTC+2)				Stadium: Allianz Stadion

==== League table ====
Austrian Bundesliga relegation round table
Pos	Team	Pld	W	D	L	GF	GA	GD	Pts	Qualification
1	WSG Tirol	32	10	10	12	46	58	−12	28	Qualification for the Europa Conference League play-offs
2	LASK	32	9	12	11	44	42	+2	26	Qualification for the Europa Conference League play-offs
3	Rheindorf Altach	32	7	8	17	24	49	−25	22	
4	Ried	32	8	13	11	40	54	−14	22	
5	Hartberg	32	7	12	13	43	47	−4	22	
6	Admira Wacker Mödling (R)	32	6	13	13	36	46	−10	21	Relegation to Austrian Football Second League

Source: Austrian Bundesliga
Rules for classification: 1) Points; 2) Points with (possible) half points subtracted due to rounding; 3) Head-to-head points; 4) Head-to-head goal difference; 5) Head-to-head goals scored; 6) Head-to-head away goals scored; 7) Goal difference; 8) Goals scored; 9) Matches won; 10) Away matches won; 11) Away goals scored.
(R) Relegated

==== Results summary ====
Overall								Home						Away					
Pld	W	D	L	GF	GA	GD	Pts	W	D	L	GF	GA	GD	W	D	L	GF	GA	GD
0	0	0	0	0	0	0	0	0	0	0	0	0	0	0	0	0	0	0	0

Last updated: 26 April 2022.
Source: Austrian Football Bundesliga

=== Austrian Cup ===
16 July 2021 First round	SV Grödig	0–7	Ried	Untersberg-Arena
18:30 CEST (UTC+2)		Report	Nutz 8', 21', 23', 82' (pen.); Reiner 17'; Offenbacher 71'; Weiddmeier 73'	Attendance: 425; Referee: Oliver Fluch

21 September 2021 Second round	SK Vorwärts Steyr	1–3	Ried	Steyr
19:25 CEST (UTC+2)	Ikwuemesi 80'	Report	Satin 39'; Pomer 49'; Meisl 63'	Stadium: Vorwärts Stadium; Attendance: 1,100; Referee: Dieter Muckenhammer

27 October 2021 Third round	Sturm Graz	1–2	Ried	Graz
18:00 CEST (UTC+2)	Jantscher 69'	Report	Bajic 36'; Meisl 52'	Stadium: Merkur-Arena; Attendance: 5,528; Referee: Sebastian Gishamer

4 February 2022 Quarter-finals	Ried	2–0	Austria Klagenfurt	Ried im Innkreis
20:20 CET (UTC+1)	Wießmeier 50' (pen.); Mikić 79'	Report		Stadium: Josko Arena; Attendance: 1,150; Referee: Harald Lechner

2 March 2022 Semi-finals	Ried	2–1	Hartberg	Ried im Innkreis
18:00 CET (UTC+1)	Seiwald 61'; Wießmeier 71' (pen.)	Report	Sturm 76'	Stadium: Josko Arena; Attendance: 3,700; Referee: Sebastian Gishamer

1 May 2022 Final	Red Bull Salzburg	3–0	Ried	Klagenfurt
17:00 CEST (UTC+2)	Sučić 27'; Wöber 52'; Šeško 87'	Report		Stadium: Wörthersee Stadion; Referee: Alexander Harkam
