= Oliver Glasner =

Austrian football manager (born 1974)

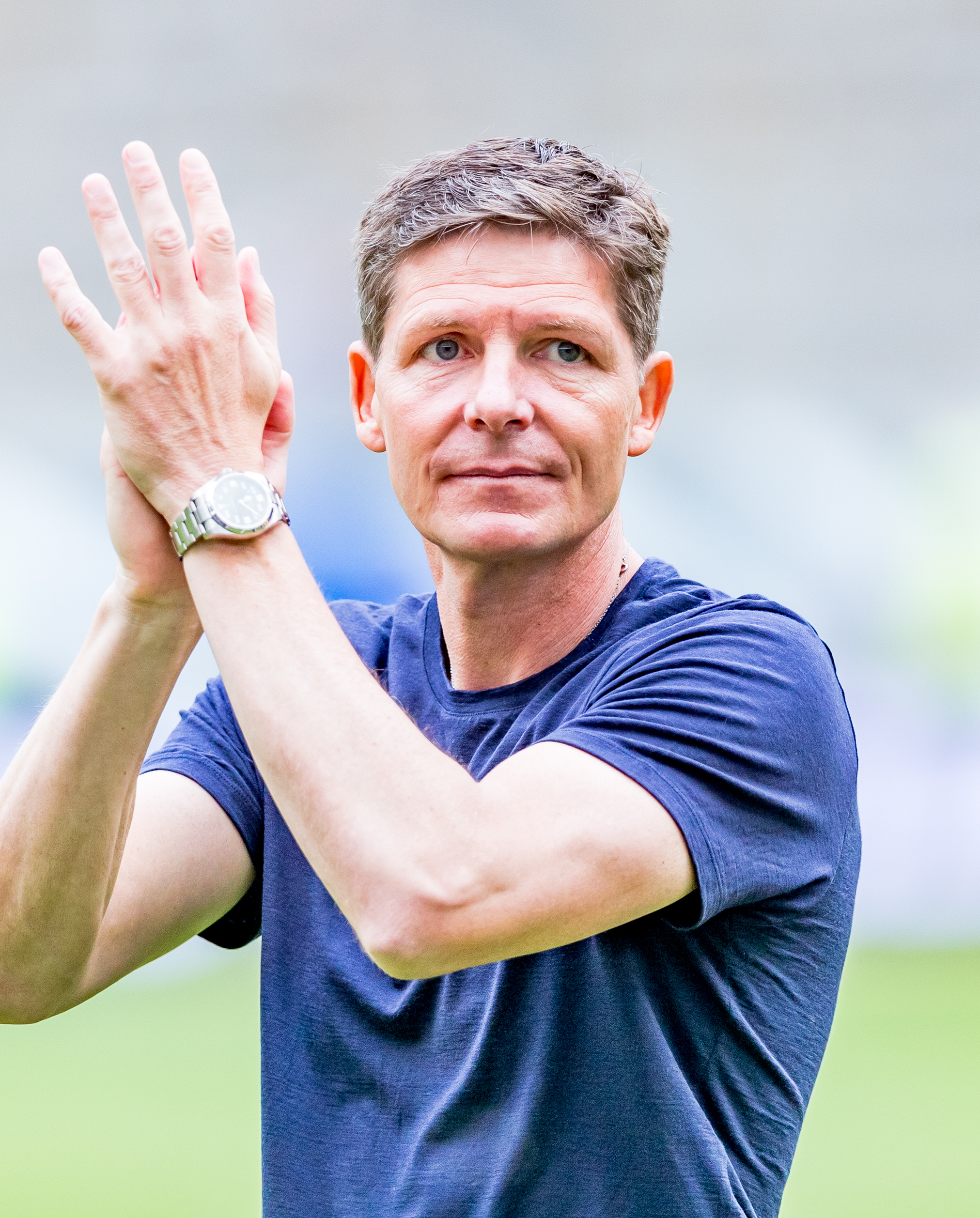
- Glasner in 2022

Personal information
- Full name: Oliver Glasner
- Date of birth: 28 August 1974 (age 52)
- Place of birth: Salzburg, Austria
- Height: 1.81 m (5 ft 11 in)
- Position: Defender

Team information
- Current team: Nottingham Forest (head coach)

Youth career
- SV Riedau

Senior career*
Years	Team	Apps	(Gls)
1992–2011	SV Ried	516	(27)
2003–2004	→ LASK (loan)	3	(0)
Total		519	(27)

Managerial career
- 2014–2015: SV Ried
- 2015–2019: LASK
- 2019–2021: VfL Wolfsburg
- 2021–2023: Eintracht Frankfurt
- 2024–2026: Crystal Palace
- 2026–: Nottingham Forest
- * Club domestic league appearances and goals

Oliver Glasner (born 28 August 1974) is an Austrian professional football manager and former player who is currently head coach of Premier League club Nottingham Forest.

A defender by trade, he spent almost all of his professional career with Austrian Bundesliga club SV Ried, winning the Austrian Cup in 1998 and 2011. Following his retirement, Glasner worked as an assistant manager at Red Bull Salzburg before returning to Ried as manager in 2014. He then spent four seasons as manager of former club LASK, winning promotion to the Austrian top flight, and helping the club finish as runners-up in his final season.

From 2019 until 2023, Glasner worked in Germany's Bundesliga, at VfL Wolfsburg and Eintracht Frankfurt. With Frankfurt he won the UEFA Europa League and led them to the Champions League knockout stages and DFB-Pokal final. From 2024 to 2026 Glasner coached Crystal Palace, where they won the FA Cup, the club's first ever major trophy, the Community Shield and the UEFA Conference League.

== Early life ==
Oliver Glasner was born on 28 August 1974 in Salzburg, and moved to Riedau before he had turned a year old.

== Playing career ==
Glasner started his career at SV Riedau, and joined the Austrian second division team SV Ried in 1993. Ried was promoted to the Austrian Bundesliga in 1995. During the 1997–98 season he won the Austrian Cup with the club. When Ried went down to second division again in 2003, Glasner joined First League team LASK for the next season, but returned to Ried a year later. Ried returned to the Bundesliga in 2005, and in the 2010–11 season, Glasner won the Austrian Cup for the second time. On 31 July 2011, he suffered a cut above the eye and a slight concussion during a heading duel in a league match between Ried and Rapid Wien. Nevertheless, he accompanied his team during the Europa League third qualifying round second leg against Brøndby.

After the final heading training session, he developed a brain hemorrhage on 4 August 2011. He was operated on the same day. Glasner survived the operation, but ended his career on the advice of the doctors on 23 August 2011. He made more than 500 league appearances in his 16-year career.

== Managerial career ==
=== Early career ===
In 2006, Glasner completed his Diplomkaufmann qualification at the University of Hagen. He was offered an assistant coach role at Ried in 2012. But Peter Vogl, then honorary president of SV Ried and CEO of Red Bull Salzburg, hired Glasner as management assistant, responsible for sports. Ralf Rangnick asked Glasner that they are looking for an assistant coach to Roger Schmidt in the first-team squad. Two weeks in his role for the 2012–13 season, Salzburg dropped out of European football against F91 Düdelingen from Luxemburg. After their successful two-year spell at Salzburg, finishing as Austrian champions, Glasner did not follow Schmidt to Leverkusen in the German Bundesliga, but instead was appointed manager at his former club Ried for the 2014–15 season. He started the campaign with two wins: 3–2 against Parndorf in the first round of the Austrian Cup on 11 July 2014; and 3–1 against Wiener Neustädter in a league game on 19 July.

=== LASK ===
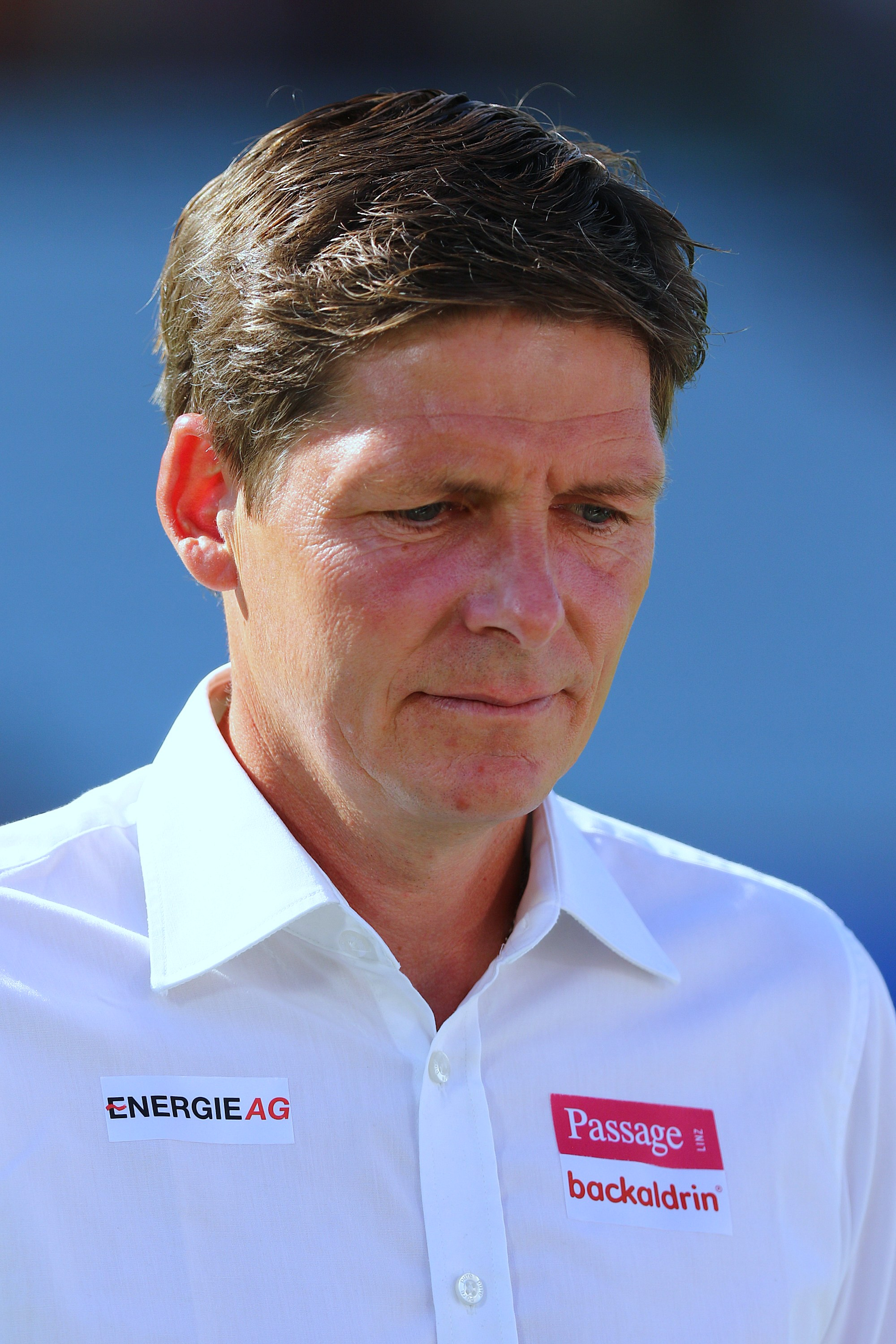
Glasner in 2018

Glasner joined LASK in the 2015–16 season as a director of sport, as well as manager. Over time, vice president Jürgen Werner and Glasner constructed a team with an unmistakable style of play. LASK earned promotion to the first division in Glasner's second season, then finished the 2017–18 Austrian Football Bundesliga season in fourth position, earning a place in the Europa League third qualifying round. It was the club's first European campaign since 2000. In the 2018–19 season, LASK finished in second place, just behind perennial champions Red Bull Salzburg, which allowed them to participate in the UEFA Champions League third qualifying round. Following his success with LASK, Jörg Schmadtke hired Glasner to manage VfL Wolfsburg in the Bundesliga, and Valérien Ismaël joined LASK as his replacement.

=== VfL Wolfsburg ===
In his first season with Wolfsburg, the club managed to qualify for the Europa League, finishing seventh in the league. Glasner also guided them to the Europa League round of 16 phase, where they lost 5–1 on aggregate against Shakhtar Donetsk. In the 2020–21 Bundesliga, Wolfsburg finished fourth, qualifying for the UEFA Champions League. Glasner left Wolfsburg after two seasons, despite qualifying for the Champions League, due to a poor relationship with sporting director Jörg Schmadtke and some players including club captain Josuha Guilavogui, who said, "I'm happy he's gone." Mark van Bommel joined to succeed Glasner.

=== Eintracht Frankfurt ===
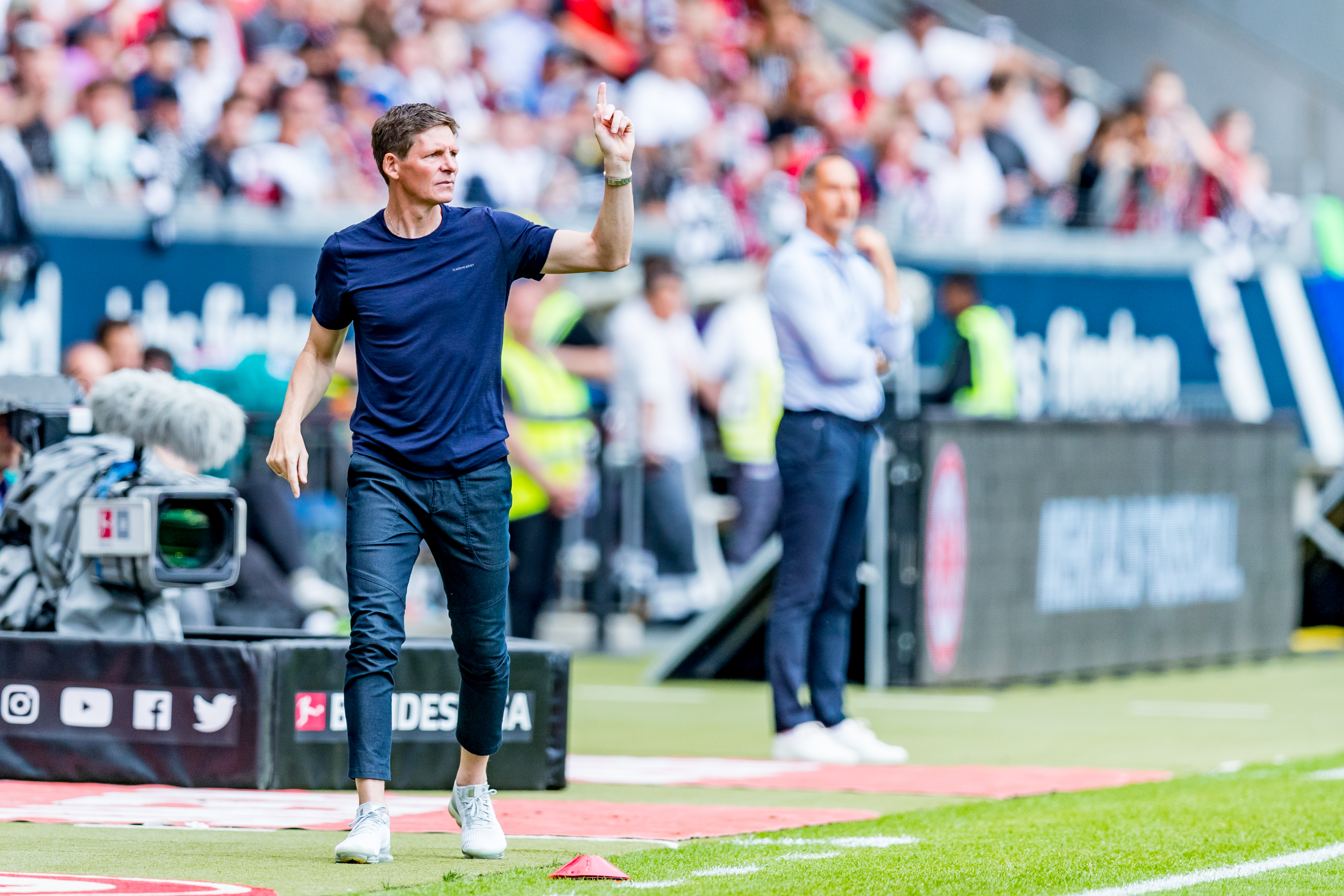
Glasner managing Eintracht Frankfurt in 2022

In May 2021, Glasner signed a three-year deal until 30 June 2024 as head coach of Eintracht Frankfurt. The start at Frankfurt was challenging. Frankfurt appointed Axel Hellmann as the new chairman of the board, Markus Krösche succeeded Fredi Bobic as managing director for sport, Ben Manga replaced Bruno Hübner as sporting director and the team lost its top scorer, André Silva, to RB Leipzig. The team lost 2–0 in the first round of DFB-Pokal against third tier Waldhof Mannheim. Frankfurt were close to the relegation zone in November, managing to win only one league game during the first months – against Bayern Munich at the Allianz Arena. It was the first time after 21 years, and after 16 matches, that they did so.

Between November and December, Frankfurt won six out of seven, and were placed sixth at the end of the first round of matches. The second half of the season was inconsistent and Frankfurt finished the league at 11th place. Their European campaign, however, was successful. They advanced to the Europa League final for the second time in the club's history (after 1980), defeating Barcelona and West Ham United en route – and won the match 5–4 on penalties against Scottish club Rangers. Frankfurt stayed undefeated for 13 EL games, and qualified for the Champions League for the first time since 1960.

The following season, Glasner led Frankfurt to second place in the Champions League group stage against Tottenham Hotspur, Sporting CP and Marseille, but lost in the round of 16 against the subsequent Italian champions Napoli. Though they were fourth at the halfway point, Frankfurt only finished seventh, winning two of their last three matches to secure qualification for the Europa Conference League. They also reached the DFB-Pokal final against RB Leipzig, but lost 2–0. Following a poor second half of the league season, Glasner left Frankfurt at the end of the 2022–23 season, one year earlier than his original contract. Dino Toppmöller was his successor.

=== Crystal Palace ===
On 19 February 2024, Glasner was appointed manager of Premier League club Crystal Palace, signing a contract until the end of the 2025–26 season. He replaced Roy Hodgson, who stepped down as manager the same day. He did not take charge of the match against Everton that day, which was overseen by interim manager Paddy McCarthy; he was instead seen watching the 1–1 draw from the Goodison Park stand alongside chairman Steve Parish. Glasner won his first game in charge, beating Burnley 3–0 at Selhurst Park on 24 February. On 14 April, Glasner won his first away game with the club, ending Liverpool's 29-game unbeaten streak at Anfield with a 1–0 win. On 6 May, he led Palace to a 4–0 win over Manchester United at Selhurst Park to complete their first ever Premier League double over the club. On the final day of the season, he led Palace to a 5–0 home win over Aston Villa, the joint biggest Premier League win in Palace's history. Palace ended the season with six wins from their last seven games, equalling their highest ever Premier League points tally of 49, having won four consecutive home games for the first time and finishing in the top 10 for the second time in the Premier League era.

On 17 May 2025, Glasner led Palace to their first major trophy in the club's history by defeating Manchester City 1–0 in the FA Cup final at Wembley Stadium. Palace finished the 2024–25 Premier League season in twelfth place with a club record 53 points. On 10 August 2025, Glasner led Palace to another trophy after beating Liverpool 3–2 on penalties in the 2025 FA Community Shield.

On 16 January 2026, Glasner announced that he would be leaving Palace at the end of the 2025–26 season, having made the decision in October 2025. Following a 2–1 loss against Sunderland the following day, Glasner publicly criticised the club's transfer policy, namely the decision to sell club captain Marc Guéhi, stating he felt "abandoned" by senior members of the club. On 27 May, Glasner led Palace to their first European title by defeating Rayo Vallecano 1–0 in the UEFA Conference League final.

=== Nottingham Forest ===
On 6 July 2026, Glasner was appointed as head coach of Nottingham Forest following Vítor Pereira's departure.

== Managerial statistics ==
As of match played 21 November 2026

Managerial record by team and tenure
Team	From	To	Record					Ref.
Team	From	To	G	W	D	L	Win %	Ref.
SV Ried	12 May 2014	25 May 2015	37	13	7	17	35.1	
LASK	1 July 2015	1 July 2019	161	94	32	35	58.4	
VfL Wolfsburg	1 July 2019	30 June 2021	87	41	22	24	47.1	
Eintracht Frankfurt	1 July 2021	30 June 2023	97	38	30	29	39.2	
Crystal Palace	19 February 2024	27 May 2026	121	51	36	34	42.1	
Nottingham Forest	6 July 2026	present	12	2	3	7	16.7	
Career total			513	239	130	144	46.6	

== Honours ==
=== Player ===
SV Ried

- Austrian Cup: 1997–98, 2010–11

=== Manager ===
LASK

- 2. Liga: 2016–17

Eintracht Frankfurt

- UEFA Europa League: 2021–22

Crystal Palace

- FA Cup: 2024–25
- FA Community Shield: 2025
- UEFA Conference League: 2025–26

Individual

- LMA John Duncan Award: 2025
- Premier League Manager of the Month: September 2025
