= Valdir =

Valdir is a given name, most commonly used in Brazil. It may refer to:

- Valdir Azevedo (1923–1980), Brazilian conductor
- Valdir (footballer, born 1937), Brazilian footballer
- Valdir (footballer, born 1943), Brazilian football defender
- Valdir (footballer, born 1998), Brazilian footballer
- Valdir Benedito (born 1965), Brazilian footballer
- Valdir Bigode (born 1972), Brazilian former footballer
- Valdir Espinosa (1947–2020), Brazilian football manager
- Valdir de Moraes (1931–2020), Brazilian football player and manager
- Valdir Lermen, Cyclist
- Valdir Pereira (1928–2001), Brazilian footballer
- Valdir Peres (1951–2017), Brazilian footballer

== See also ==
- all articles starting with "Valdir"
- Waldir
