= Hochhauser =

Hochhauser is a surname. Notable people with the surname include:

- Daniel Hochhauser (born 1957), British oncologist
- Heinz Hochhauser (born 1947), Austrian football manager
- Victor Hochhauser (1923–2019), British music promoter

== See also ==
- Mark Sofer (born 1954), Israeli diplomat, born Mark Hochhauser
