= Michael Angerschmid =

Austrian football manager

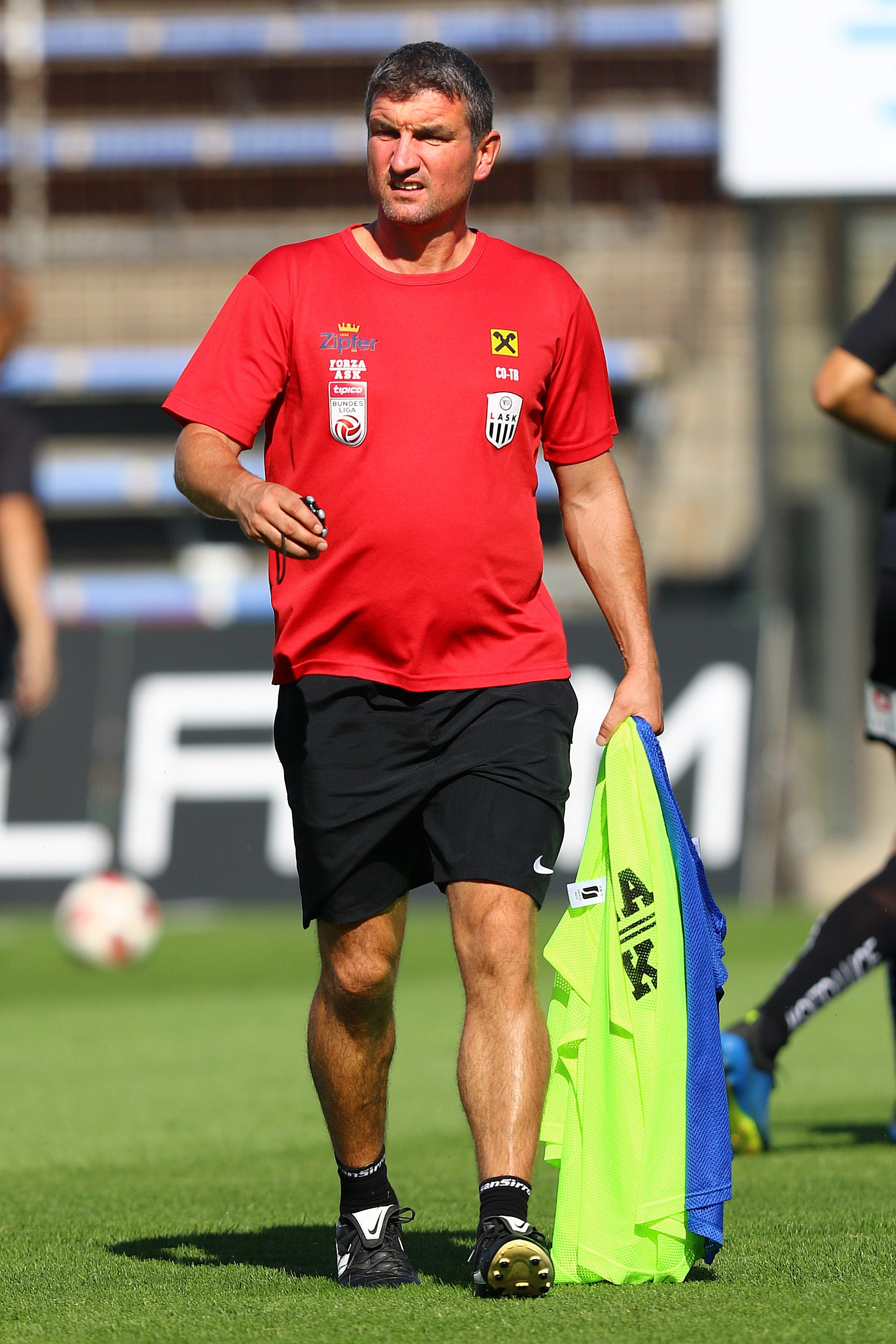

Personal information
- Full name: Michael Angerschmid
- Date of birth: 24 February 1974 (age 52)
- Place of birth: Schärding, Austria

Team information
- Current team: Nottingham Forest (assistant head coach)

Youth career
- SV Pram
- 1982–1993: SV Ried

Senior career*
Years	Team	Apps	(Gls)
1992–2006	SV Ried	406	(21)

Managerial career
- 2007–2012: SV Ried II
- 2007–2008: SV Ried
- * Club domestic league appearances and goals

Michael Angerschmid (born 24 February 1974) is an Austrian football coach and former player who is currently assistant head coach at Premier League club Nottingham Forest.

Angerschmid had a long career as a player at SV Ried and played in the squad that won the Austrian Cup in 1998.
