= 2026–27 2. Bundesliga =

2. Bundesliga
- Season: 2026–27
- Dates: 7 August 2026 – 23 May 2027
- Matches: 108
- Goals: 322 (2.98 per match)
- Top goalscorer: four players (7 goals)
- Biggest home win: Magdeburg 6–1 Karlsruhe
- Biggest away win: Cottbus 0–4 Hertha
- Highest scoring: Braunschweig 3–5 Hertha; Heidenheim 5–3 Dresden; Wolfsburg 4–4 Cottbus; Nürnberg 4–4 Wolfsburg
- Longest winning run: 7 games Hertha
- Longest unbeaten run: 12 games Hertha
- Longest winless run: 8 games Kiel
- Longest losing run: 2 games Hannover; Osnabrück
- Attendance: 2,870,219 (26,576 per match)
- All statistics correct as of 22 November 2026.

The 2026–27 2. Bundesliga is the 53rd season of the 2. Bundesliga. The season began on 7 August 2026 and will conclude on 23 May 2027.

== Teams ==
Locations of the 2026–27 2. Bundesliga teams

=== Team changes ===
Promoted from 2025–26 3. Liga	Relegated from 2025–26 Bundesliga	Promoted to 2026–27 Bundesliga	Relegated to 2026–27 3. Liga
VfL Osnabrück; Energie Cottbus	VfL Wolfsburg; 1. FC Heidenheim; FC St. Pauli	Schalke 04; SV Elversberg; SC Paderborn	Fortuna Düsseldorf; Preußen Münster

=== Stadiums and locations ===
Team	Location	Stadium	Capacity
Hertha BSC	Berlin	Olympiastadion	74,649
Arminia Bielefeld	Bielefeld	Schüco-Arena	27,332
VfL Bochum	Bochum	Vonovia Ruhrstadion	26,000
Eintracht Braunschweig	Braunschweig	Eintracht-Stadion	23,325
Energie Cottbus	Cottbus	LEAG Energie Stadion	22,528
Darmstadt 98	Darmstadt	Merck-Stadion am Böllenfalltor	17,650
Dynamo Dresden	Dresden	Rudolf-Harbig-Stadion	32,249
Greuther Fürth	Fürth	Sportpark Ronhof Thomas Sommer	16,626
Hannover 96	Hanover	Heinz von Heiden Arena	49,000
1. FC Heidenheim	Heidenheim	Voith-Arena	15,000
1. FC Kaiserslautern	Kaiserslautern	Fritz-Walter-Stadion	49,327
Karlsruher SC	Karlsruhe	BBBank Wildpark	34,302
Holstein Kiel	Kiel	Holstein-Stadion	15,034
1. FC Magdeburg	Magdeburg	Avnet Arena	30,098
1. FC Nürnberg	Nuremberg	Max-Morlock-Stadion	49,923
VfL Osnabrück	Osnabrück	Stadion an der Bremer Brücke	15,741
FC St. Pauli	Hamburg	Millerntor-Stadion	29,546
VfL Wolfsburg	Wolfsburg	Volkswagen Arena	30,000

=== Personnel and kits ===
Team	Manager	Captain	Kit manufacturer	Shirt sponsor	
Team	Manager	Captain	Kit manufacturer	Front	Sleeve
Hertha BSC	(Germany) Stefan Leitl	(Croatia) Josip Brekalo	Castore	Sparda-Bank Berlin	Mall of Berlin
Arminia Bielefeld	(Germany) Oliver Kirch	(Germany) Maximilian Bauer	Umbro	Schüco	Danne Holding
VfL Bochum	(Germany) Uwe Rösler	(Germany) Timo Horn	Mizuno	Vonovia	MTEL Germany
Eintracht Braunschweig	(Germany) Lars Kornetka	(Germany) Ron-Thorben Hoffmann	Umbro	BRAWO Group	Lease a Bike
Energie Cottbus	(Germany) Claus-Dieter Wollitz	(Germany) Axel Borgmann	Adidas	LEAG	Sparkasse Spree-Neiße
Darmstadt 98	(Germany) Florian Kohfeldt	(Germany) Marcel Schuhen	Craft	HAIX	Suzuki
Dynamo Dresden	(Switzerland) Thomas Stamm	(Germany) Niklas Hauptmann	Jako	ALL-INKL.COM	ad hoc Gruppe
Greuther Fürth	(Germany) Heiko Vogel	(Germany) Felix Klaus	Puma	Hofmann Personal	Buxtrade
Hannover 96	(Germany) Sandro Wagner	(Iceland) Stefán Teitur Þórðarson	Macron	Heise	Hannoversche Volksbank
1. FC Heidenheim	(Germany) Frank Schmidt	(Germany) Patrick Mainka	Puma	MHP	Voith
1. FC Kaiserslautern	(Germany) Torsten Lieberknecht	(Germany) Marlon Ritter	Castore	Novoline	Lacalut
Karlsruher SC	(Austria) Maximilian Senft	(Germany) Marvin Wanitzek	Macron	SWEG	billiger.de
Holstein Kiel	(Germany) Michél Kniat	(Germany) Jonas Meffert	Puma	Famila	Lotto Schleswig-Holstein
1. FC Magdeburg	(Germany) Petrik Sander / (Germany) Pascal Ibold	(Germany) Dominik Reimann	Hummel	Humanas	SWM Magdeburg
1. FC Nürnberg	(Germany) Miroslav Klose	(Germany) Jan Reichert	Adidas	Toolcraft AG	Helmsauer
VfL Osnabrück	(Germany) Timo Schultz	(Germany) Jannik Müller	Capelli Sport	Thomas Philipps	JOPA
FC St. Pauli	(Germany) Marcel Rapp	(Austria) David Nemeth	Puma	Congstar	Astra Bier
VfL Wolfsburg	(Germany) Tobias Strobl	(Germany) Maximilian Arnold	Nike	Volkswagen	Mobileye

=== Managerial changes ===
Team	Outgoing	Manner	Exit date		Position in table	Incoming	Incoming date		Ref.
Team	Outgoing	Manner	Announced on	Departed on	Position in table	Incoming	Announced on	Arrived on	Ref.
Karlsruher SC	(Germany) Christian Eichner	Mutual consent	8 April 2026	30 June 2026	Pre-season	(Austria) Maximilian Senft	21 May 2026	1 July 2026	
Arminia Bielefeld	(Germany) Michél Kniat	Mutual consent	23 May 2026	30 June 2026	Pre-season	(Germany) Oliver Kirch	5 June 2026	1 July 2026	
VfL Wolfsburg	(Germany) Dieter Hecking	Appointed sporting director	30 May 2026	30 June 2026	Pre-season	(Germany) Tobias Strobl	3 June 2026	1 July 2026	
FC St. Pauli	(Germany) Alexander Blessin	Sacked	4 June 2026	30 June 2026	Pre-season	(Germany) Marcel Rapp	5 June 2026	1 July 2026	
Hannover 96	(Germany) Christian Titz	Sacked	14 September 2026		15th	(Germany) Lars Barlemann (interim)	14 September 2026		
Hannover 96	(Germany) Lars Barlemann (interim)	End of interim spell	19 September 2026	21 September 2026	16th	(Germany) Sandro Wagner	19 September 2026	21 September 2026	
Holstein Kiel	(Germany) Tim Walter	Sacked	9 November 2026		18th	(Germany) Michél Kniat	10 November 2026		

== League table ==
Pos	Team	Pld	W	D	L	GF	GA	GD	Pts	Promotion, qualification or relegation
1	Hertha BSC	12	11	1	0	29	9	+20	34	Promotion to Bundesliga
2	1. FC Nürnberg	12	7	3	2	27	15	+12	24	Promotion to Bundesliga
3	1. FC Magdeburg	12	7	2	3	27	15	+12	23	Qualification for promotion play-offs
4	VfL Wolfsburg	12	6	4	2	29	16	+13	22	
5	1. FC Kaiserslautern	12	6	4	2	12	9	+3	22	
6	Arminia Bielefeld	12	5	2	5	19	18	+1	17	
7	1. FC Heidenheim	12	4	4	4	20	23	−3	16	
8	FC St. Pauli	12	3	6	3	15	16	−1	15	
9	Hannover 96	12	4	3	5	14	19	−5	15	
10	Eintracht Braunschweig	12	4	2	6	18	19	−1	14	
11	VfL Bochum	12	4	2	6	11	15	−4	14	
12	VfL Osnabrück	12	3	3	6	14	18	−4	12	
13	Dynamo Dresden	12	3	3	6	17	22	−5	12	
14	Greuther Fürth	12	3	3	6	14	21	−7	12	
15	Karlsruher SC	12	3	3	6	15	24	−9	12	
16	Darmstadt 98	12	3	3	6	12	22	−10	12	Qualification for relegation play-offs
17	Energie Cottbus	12	2	5	5	18	24	−6	11	Relegation to 3. Liga
18	Holstein Kiel	12	1	5	6	11	17	−6	8	Relegation to 3. Liga

Updated to match(es) played on 22 November 2026. Source: Bundesliga
Rules for classification: 1) Points; 2) Goal difference; 3) Goals scored; 4) Head-to-head results; 5) Head-to-head away goals scored; 6) Away goals scored; 7) Play-off.
(Rules 4–6 only apply after home and away matches have been played between the tied teams.)

== Results ==
Home \ Away	BSC	BIE	BOC	BRA	COT	DAR	DRE	FÜR	HAN	HEI	KAI	KAR	KIE	MAG	NÜR	OSN	STP	WOL
Hertha BSC	—	1–0						2–1		4–1				2–1				2–1
Arminia Bielefeld		—		3–1	3–0					2–2				1–2		2–1	2–2	
VfL Bochum	0–1	0–1	—					1–1				3–2				0–1		1–1
Eintracht Braunschweig	3–5		0–1	—	0–0		2–2		2–0				1–0					
Energie Cottbus	0–4		1–2		—			3–4	3–1						1–1		1–1	
Darmstadt 98		2–1			3–1	—			0–1	3–1			2–2	1–1			0–0	
Dynamo Dresden	1–2		1–2			1–0	—	3–0						2–0				
Greuther Fürth				2–0				—		0–1			1–0	1–1	2–4			
Hannover 96			2–1	a			2–1	2–1	—			2–2					1–1	0–1
1. FC Heidenheim					1–1		5–3		2–2	—	0–0		1–0			4–3		
1. FC Kaiserslautern	0–3		2–0	1–0		3–0	2–2				—	0–0						
Karlsruher SC		2–1			0–3	4–0				2–1		—			0–1	0–0		2–5
Holstein Kiel	0–0	1–2					3–0						—		2–2	1–1	2–2	
1. FC Magdeburg				1–6					3–0		3–0	6–1	2–0	—			4–1	
1. FC Nürnberg		4–1		1–2		2–0	3–0		2–1		0–1				—			4–4
VfL Osnabrück	1–3			3–1			1–1	3–0			0–1			0–3		—		
FC St. Pauli			2–0					1–1			1–2	2–0			1–3		—	1–0
VfL Wolfsburg					4–4	5–1				3–1	0–0		3–0			2–0		—

Updated to match(es) played on 22 November 2026. Source: Bundesliga
Legend: Blue = home team win; Yellow = draw; Red = away team win.
For upcoming matches, an "a" indicates there is an article about the rivalry between the two participants.

== Relegation play-offs ==
The relegation play-offs will take place on 28 May and 1 June 2027.

== Statistics ==
=== Top goalscorers ===
As of 22 November 2026

Rank	Player	Club	Goals
1	(Germany) Joel Grodowski	Arminia Bielefeld	7
1	(Germany) Felix Klaus	Greuther Fürth	7
1	(Italy) Mohamed Alì Zoma	1. FC Nürnberg	7
1	(Germany) Emmanuel Iyoha	1. FC Magdeburg	7
5	(Germany) Fabian Reese	VfL Wolfsburg	6
5	(Germany) Piet Scobel	1. FC Nürnberg	6
5	(Poland) Mateusz Żukowski	1. FC Magdeburg	6
8	(Austria) Oluwaseun Adewumi	Hertha BSC	5
8	(Croatia) Josip Brekalo	Hertha BSC	5
8	(Germany) Justin Butler	Energie Cottbus	5
8	(The Gambia) Abdoulie Ceesay	FC St. Pauli	5
8	(Germany) Tolcay Ciğerci	Energie Cottbus	5
8	(Germany) Robert Glatzel	VfL Wolfsburg	5
8	(Denmark) Sebastian Grønning	Hertha BSC	5
8	(Germany) Phil Harres	Holstein Kiel	5
8	(Germany) Philipp Hofmann	VfL Bochum	5
8	(Georgia (country)) Budu Zivzivadze	1. FC Heidenheim	5

=== Hat-tricks ===
Date	Player	Club	Against	Result
9 August 2026	(Italy) Mohamed Alì Zoma	1. FC Nürnberg	Dynamo Dresden	3–0 (H)
16 August 2026	(Germany) Joel Grodowski	Arminia Bielefeld	Energie Cottbus	3–0 (H)

=== Clean sheets ===
As of 22 November 2026

Rank	Player	Club	Clean sheets
1	(Germany) Julian Krahl	1. FC Kaiserslautern	8
2	(Germany) Marius Gersbeck	Hertha BSC	5
3	(Germany) Dominik Reimann	1. FC Magdeburg	4
3	(Germany) Ben Voll	FC St. Pauli	4
5	(Denmark) Hans Christian Bernat	Karlsruher SC	3
5	(Germany) Thomas Dähne	1. FC Heidenheim	3
5	(Germany) Jonas Krumrey	VfL Osnabrück	3
5	(Germany) Jan Reichert	1. FC Nürnberg	3
9	(Germany) Florian Hellstern	Greuther Fürth	2
9	(Germany) Lennart Grill	Dynamo Dresden	2
9	(Germany) Ron-Thorben Hoffmann	Eintracht Braunschweig	2
9	(Germany) Jonas Kersken	Arminia Bielefeld	2
9	(Germany) Marcel Lotka	Energie Cottbus	2
9	(Germany) Timon Weiner	Holstein Kiel	2
9	(Germany) Timon Wellenreuther	VfL Wolfsburg	2
9	(Poland) Jakub Zieliński	VfL Wolfsburg	2
