= Helmut Kraft =

Austrian football manager

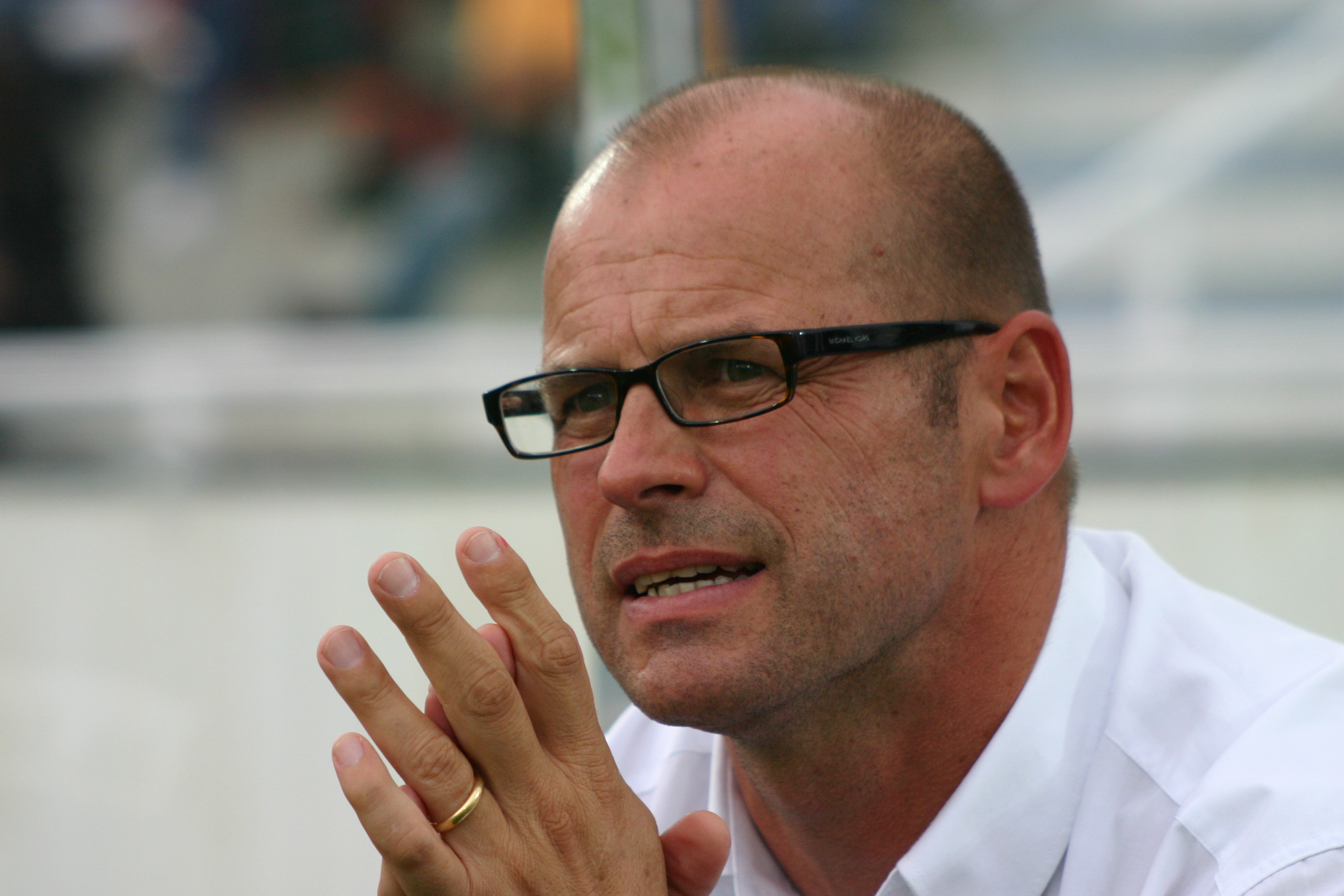

Personal information
- Date of birth: 24 July 1958 (age 68)
- Place of birth: Hall in Tirol, Austria
- Height: 1.84 m (6 ft 0 in)

Team information
- Current team: SV Fügen

Managerial career
- Years: Team
- 1996–1997: SV Hall
- 1997–2002: SV Wörgl
- 2002–2003: FC Untersiebenbrunn
- 2003–2004: Wacker Tirol
- 2005: FC Pasching (interim manager)
- 2006–2007: SV Ried
- 2007–2008: FC Wacker Innsbruck
- 2008–2009: SC Wiener Neustadt
- 2010: LASK Linz
- 2011: SV Hall
- 2012–2013: Wiener Sport-Club
- 2013–2014: SK Vorwärts Steyr
- 2015–2019: SK Zell/Ziller
- 2019–2020: FC Lustenau (sporting director)
- 2020–2024: SPG Silz/Mötz
- 2025–: SV Fügen

Helmut Kraft (born 24 July 1958) is an Austrian football manager.
