= Jan Reichert =

German footballer (born 2001)

Personal information
- Date of birth: 28 June 2001 (age 25)
- Place of birth: Schweinfurt, Germany
- Height: 1.91 m (6 ft 3 in)
- Position: Goalkeeper

Team information
- Current team: 1. FC Nürnberg
- Number: 1

Youth career
- TSV Pfändehausen
- SpVgg Hambach
- FT Schweinfurt
- 2017–2018: 1. FC Schweinfurt 05

Senior career*
| Years | Team | Apps | (Gls) |
| 2018–2021 | 1. FC Schweinfurt 05 | 4 | (0) |
| 2021–2024 | 1. FC Nürnberg II | 84 | (0) |
| 2022– | 1. FC Nürnberg | 69 | (0) |
- * Club domestic league appearances and goals as of 06:40, 30 August 2026 (UTC)

Jan Reichert (born 28 June 2001) is a German footballer who plays as a goalkeeper for German 2. Bundesliga club 1. FC Nürnberg.

== Club career ==
Born in Schweinfurt, Reichert started his professional career with amateur 1. FC Schweinfurt 05 before joining the reserve team of 1. FC Nürnberg II on 10 February 2021. After appearing regularly for the side, he received a professional contract on 26 January 2022 and was promoted to the senior side; thus becoming a third choice goalkeeper.

Ahead of the 2026–27 season, Reichert was appointed club captain.

== Career statistics ==
As of match played 10 August 2026

Appearances and goals by club, season and competition
| Club | Season | League | | | DFB-Pokal | | Continental | | Other | | Total | |
| Club | Season | Division | Apps | Goals | Apps | Goals | Apps | Goals | Apps | Goals | Apps | Goals |
|---|---|---|---|---|---|---|---|---|---|---|---|---|
| 1. FC Schweinfurt 05 | 2018–19 | Regionalliga Bayern | 1 | 0 | — | | — | | — | | 1 | 0 |
| 1. FC Schweinfurt 05 | 2019–20 | Regionalliga Bayern | 4 | 0 | — | | — | | — | | 4 | 0 |
| 1. FC Schweinfurt 05 | 2020–21 | Regionalliga Bayern | 0 | 0 | 0 | 0 | — | | — | | 0 | 0 |
| 1. FC Schweinfurt 05 | Total | | 5 | 0 | 0 | 0 | — | | — | | 5 | 0 |
| 1. FC Nürnberg II | 2021–22 | Regionalliga Bayern | 31 | 0 | — | | — | | — | | 31 | 0 |
| 1. FC Nürnberg II | 2022–23 | Regionalliga Bayern | 28 | 0 | — | | — | | — | | 28 | 0 |
| 1. FC Nürnberg II | 2023–24 | Regionalliga Bayern | 25 | 0 | — | | — | | — | | 25 | 0 |
| 1. FC Nürnberg II | Total | | 84 | 0 | — | | — | | — | | 84 | 0 |
| 1. FC Nürnberg | 2022–23 | 2. Bundesliga | 0 | 0 | 0 | 0 | — | | — | | 0 | 0 |
| 1. FC Nürnberg | 2023–24 | 2. Bundesliga | 1 | 0 | 0 | 0 | — | | — | | 1 | 0 |
| 1. FC Nürnberg | 2024–25 | 2. Bundesliga | 32 | 0 | 0 | 0 | — | | — | | 32 | 0 |
| 1. FC Nürnberg | 2025–26 | 2. Bundesliga | 33 | 0 | 0 | 0 | — | | — | | 33 | 0 |
| 1. FC Nürnberg | 2026–27 | 2. Bundesliga | 3 | 0 | 1 | 0 | — | | — | | 4 | 0 |
| 1. FC Nürnberg | Total | | 69 | 0 | 1 | 0 | — | | — | | 70 | 0 |
| Career total | | | 158 | 0 | 1 | 0 | 0 | 0 | 0 | 0 | 159 | 0 |
