= Waldir =

Waldir is a Portuguese given name, most commonly used in Brazil, derived from the German name Walter. It may refer to:

- Waldir Guerra
- Waldir Pereira
- Waldir Lucas Pereira
- Waldir Pires
- Waldir Sáenz
- Waldir Azevedo

== See also ==
- all articles starting with "Waldir"
- Valdir
