= Josef Weberbauer =

Austrian footballer (born 1998)

Personal information
- Date of birth: 13 March 1998 (age 28)
- Place of birth: Kuchl, Austria
- Height: 1.73 m (5 ft 8 in)
- Position: Right-back

Team information
- Current team: Admira Wacker
- Number: 33

Youth career
- 2006–2007: Kuchl
- 2007–2012: Red Bull Salzburg
- 2012–2013: Kuchl

Senior career*
| Years | Team | Apps | (Gls) |
| 2016–2019 | Anif | 74 | (8) |
| 2019–2020 | SAK 1914 | 18 | (2) |
| 2020–2022 | Grazer AK | 50 | (3) |
| 2022 | Ried II | 2 | (1) |
| 2022–2023 | Ried | 17 | (0) |
| 2023–2024 | DSV Leoben | 22 | (1) |
| 2024– | Admira Wacker | 58 | (6) |
- * Club domestic league appearances and goals as of 17 May 2026

Josef Weberbauer (born 13 March 1998) is an Austrian professional footballer who plays as a right-back for Admira Wacker.

== Career ==
Weberbauer is a youth product of the academies of Kuchl and Red Bull Salzburg. He began his senior career with Anif in 2016, before moving to SAK 1914 in 2019. On 3 February 2020, he transferred to the 2. Liga club Grazer AK. He moved to Ried in the Austrian Football Bundesliga on 14 January 2022, signing a contract until 2024.

On 12 July 2024, Weberbauer signed with 2. Liga club Admira Wacker.

== Playing style ==
Weberbauer is an energetic right-back who is known for his tireless runs up and down the pitch. Due to his stamina, his playstyle is compared to the Austrian international footballer Stefan Lainer.
