= Valdir (footballer, born 1998) =

Brazilian footballer

Personal information
- Full name: Valdir Henrique Barbosa da Silva
- Date of birth: 3 April 1998 (age 28)
- Place of birth: Maceió, Brazil
- Height: 1.75 m (5 ft 9 in)
- Position: Forward

Team information
- Current team: SV Oberwart
- Number: 9

Youth career
- CSA

Senior career*
Years	Team	Apps	(Gls)
2019	Coruripe	4	(0)
2019–2020	Decisão	12	(1)
2019	→ Linense (loan)	0	(0)
2020	Coruripe	1	(1)
2020–2021	Mariunese	19	(11)
2021–2022	SV Ried	5	(0)
2022	Kapfenberger SV	10	(0)
2022–2023	VfB Hohenems	33	(28)
2024–2025	ASKÖ Oedt	34	(14)
2026–	SV Oberwart	6	(0)
- * Club domestic league appearances and goals as of 28 June 2026

Valdir Henrique Barbosa da Silva (born 3 April 1998), known as Valdir, is a Brazilian professional footballer who plays as a forward for the third-tier Austrian Regionalliga club SV Oberwart.

He previously played in Brazil for Coruripe, Decisão, Linense and Mariunese, and in Austria for SV Ried.

== Career ==
Born in Maceió, Valdir played youth football for CSA before signing for Coruripe in December 2018, ahead of the 2019 season. He joined Decisão later in 2019 before a loan spell at Linense. He returned to Coruripe in 2020 before signing for Mariunese later that year. In summer 2021, he signed for Austrian Bundesliga club SV Ried on a two-year contract, alongside Maruinense teammate Reinaldo. On 28 January 2022, Valdir moved to Kapfenberger SV in the Austrian second tier on a 1.5-year contract.

== Career statistics ==
As of end of 2021–22 season

Appearances and goals by club, season and competition
Club	Season	League			State League		National cup		Other		Total	
Club	Season	Division	Apps	Goals	Apps	Goals	Apps	Goals	Apps	Goals	Apps	Goals
Coruripe	2019	Série D	2	0	2 (Note: Appearance(s) in Campeonato Alagoano)	0	—		0	0	4	0
Decisão	2019	—			5 (Note: Appearance(s) in Campeonato Pernambucano)	1	—		0	0	5	1
Decisão	2020	—			7	0	—		0	0	7	0
Decisão	Total		0	0	12	1	0	0	0	0	12	1
Linense (loan)	2019	—			—		—		6 (Note: Appearance(s) in Copa Paulista)	1	6	1
Coruripe	2020	Série D	0	0	1	1	—		0	0	1	1
Mariunese	2020	—			10 (Note: Appearance(s) in Campeonato Sergipano Série A2)	5	—		0	0	10	5
Mariunese	2021	—			9 (Note: Appearance(s) in Campeonato Sergipano)	6	—		0	0	9	6
Mariunese	Total		0	0	19	11	0	0	0	0	19	11
SV Ried	2021–22	Austrian Bundesliga	5	0	—		2	0	0	0	7	0
Kapfenberger SV	2021–22	Austrian 2. Liga	10	0	—		0	0	0	0	10	0
Career total			17	0	34	13	2	0	6	1	59	14
