= 2004–05 Austrian Football First League =

Austrian Football First League
- Season: 2004–05
- Promoted: SV Ried
- Relegated: SC Untersiebenbrunn; SV Wörgl
- Matches: 180
- Goals: 504 (2.8 per match)

The 2004–05 Austrian Football First League season was the 31st season of second level league football in Austria. It was the third season that it used the name Red Zac First League.

== Team movements ==
=== Promoted to Bundesliga ===
- FC Wacker Tirol

=== Relegated from Bundesliga ===
- FC Kärnten

=== Promoted from Regionalliga ===
- SC Rheindorf Altach
- FC Gratkorn

=== Relegated to Regionalliga ===
- FC Lustenau
- BSV Juniors

== Teams ==
Club Name	Stadium	Capacity
Austria Lustenau	Reichshofstadion	12,500
DSV Leoben	Donawitz Stadium	6,000
FC Gratkorn	Sportstadion Gratkorn	3,000
FC Kärnten	Hypo-Arena	32,000
Kapfenberger SV	Franz Fekete Stadium	12,000
LASK Linz	Linzer Stadion	14,000
SC Rheindorf Altach	Stadion Schnabelholz	8,900
SV Ried	Fill Metallbau Stadion	7,680
SC Untersiebenbrunn	Sportplatz Untersiebenbrunn	
SV Wörgl	Sportstadion Wörgl	3,500

== Table ==
Pos	Team	Pld	W	D	L	GF	GA	GD	Pts	Promotion or relegation
1	SV Ried (C, P)	36	24	5	7	79	38	+41	77	Promotion to 2005–06 Austrian Bundesliga
2	Kapfenberger SV	36	21	8	7	64	37	+27	71	
3	FC Kärnten	36	17	7	12	68	41	+27	58	
4	Austria Lustenau	36	14	14	8	55	43	+12	56	
5	DSV Leoben	36	12	11	13	43	49	−6	47	
6	SC Rheindorf Altach	36	9	14	13	37	45	−8	41	
7	LASK Linz	36	8	15	13	38	64	−26	39	
8	SC Untersiebenbrunn (R)	36	9	7	20	45	66	−21	34	Relegation to 2005–06 Austrian Regionalliga (Note: SC Untersiebenbrunn were relegated after losing Relegation/Promotion play-off with FC Kufstein)
9	FC Gratkorn	36	6	14	16	43	58	−15	32	
10	SV Wörgl (R)	36	7	11	18	32	63	−31	32	Relegation to 2005–06 Austrian Regionalliga

Source: Weltfussball.de
Rules for classification: 1) points; 2) goal difference; 3) number of goals scored.
(C) Champions; (P) Promoted; (R) Relegated
