= Maximilian Senft =

Austrian footballer, manager and coach and former poker player (born 1989)

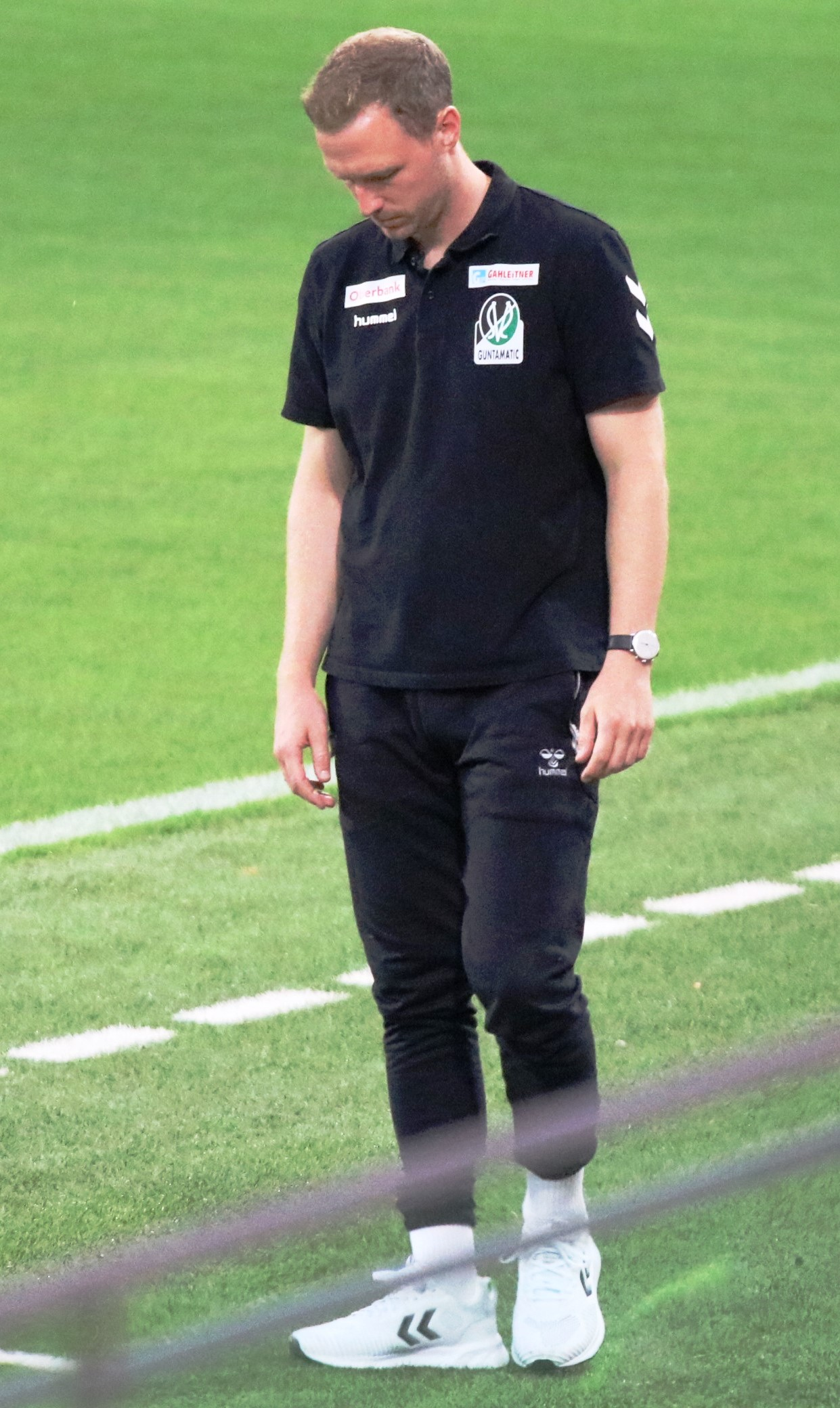
- Senft in 2023

Personal information
- Date of birth: 4 August 1989 (age 37)
- Place of birth: Vienna, Austria
- Height: 1.80 m (5 ft 11 in)

Team information
- Current team: Karlsruher SC (head coach)

Youth career
- 1997–1998: FCN St. Pölten
- 1998–2008: SV Gerasdorf/Stammersdorf

Senior career*
Years	Team	Apps	(Gls)
2009–2010	SV Langenzersdorf	35	(1)
2010–2011	USV Gaweinstal	33	(2)
2012–2014	SV Stetten	46	(6)
2014	DSG Inter Leopoldau	1	(0)
2015–2018	SV Stetten	54	(11)

Managerial career
- 2017: SC Pinkafeld
- 2020–2022: SC Pinkafeld
- 2021–2022: Südburgenland
- 2022–2023: Ried II
- 2023–2026: Ried
- 2026–: Karlsruher SC
- * Club domestic league appearances and goals

Maximilian Senft (born 4 August 1989) is an Austrian football manager, former footballer, and former poker player who is the current head coach of Karlsruher SC.

== Career ==
Senft was a product of the youth academies of the Austrian clubs FCN St. Pölten and SV Gerasdorf/Stammersdorf. He was a semi-pro footballer in Austria, having played with SV Langenzersdorf, USV Gaweinstal, SV Stetten, and DSG Inter Leopoldau.

== Managerial career ==
While playing, Senft became a youth coach with SV Leobendorf for the 2015–16 season. In 2016, he was named assistant coach at SC Pinkafeld. On 10 May 2017, he was named manager at Pinkafeld in the Austrian Landesliga. On 13 June 2017 after only 7 games, he moved to Floridsdorfer AC as assistant manager while they were in the 2. Liga under Thomas Eidler for the 2017–18 season. For the 2018–19 season, he was assistant to Thomas Letsch in the Austrian Football Bundesliga with Austria Wien. He spent the 2019–20 and 2020–21 season as assistant manager to Gerhard Struber with Wolfsberger AC in the Austrian Bundesliga and Barnsley in the EFL Championship respectively.

On 3 July 2020, he again returned to Pinkafeld as manager in the Landesliga. On 3 July 2021, he started simultaneously managing the women's team Südburgenland in the ÖFB Frauen Bundesliga. Following Südburgenland's relegation in 2022, he started managing the reserves of Ried on 20 June 2022. On 1 March 2023, he was named Ried's senior manager in the Austrian Bundesliga, taking over from Christian Heinle.

In May 2026, he was appointed as the new head coach of Karlsruher SC.

== Poker career ==
In October 2011, Senft achieved his first money placement in a live tournament at the Montesino Casino in Vienna. He reached the final table at the main event at the World Poker Tour in April 2012, where he came in seventh place. In March 2013, he won main event at the German Championship at the King's Resort Rozvadov, earning a top prize of €50,000. In July 2014, he cashed out at the World Series of Poker event in Rio Las Vegas. He reached the seventh day of the tournament, and came in 11th place earning over $500,000. In August 2014, he finished 14th in the European Poker Tour in Barcelona, earning another €65,000. His last money placement was in August 2015. His total career earnings were $881,471.
