= Felix Seiwald =

Austrian association footballer

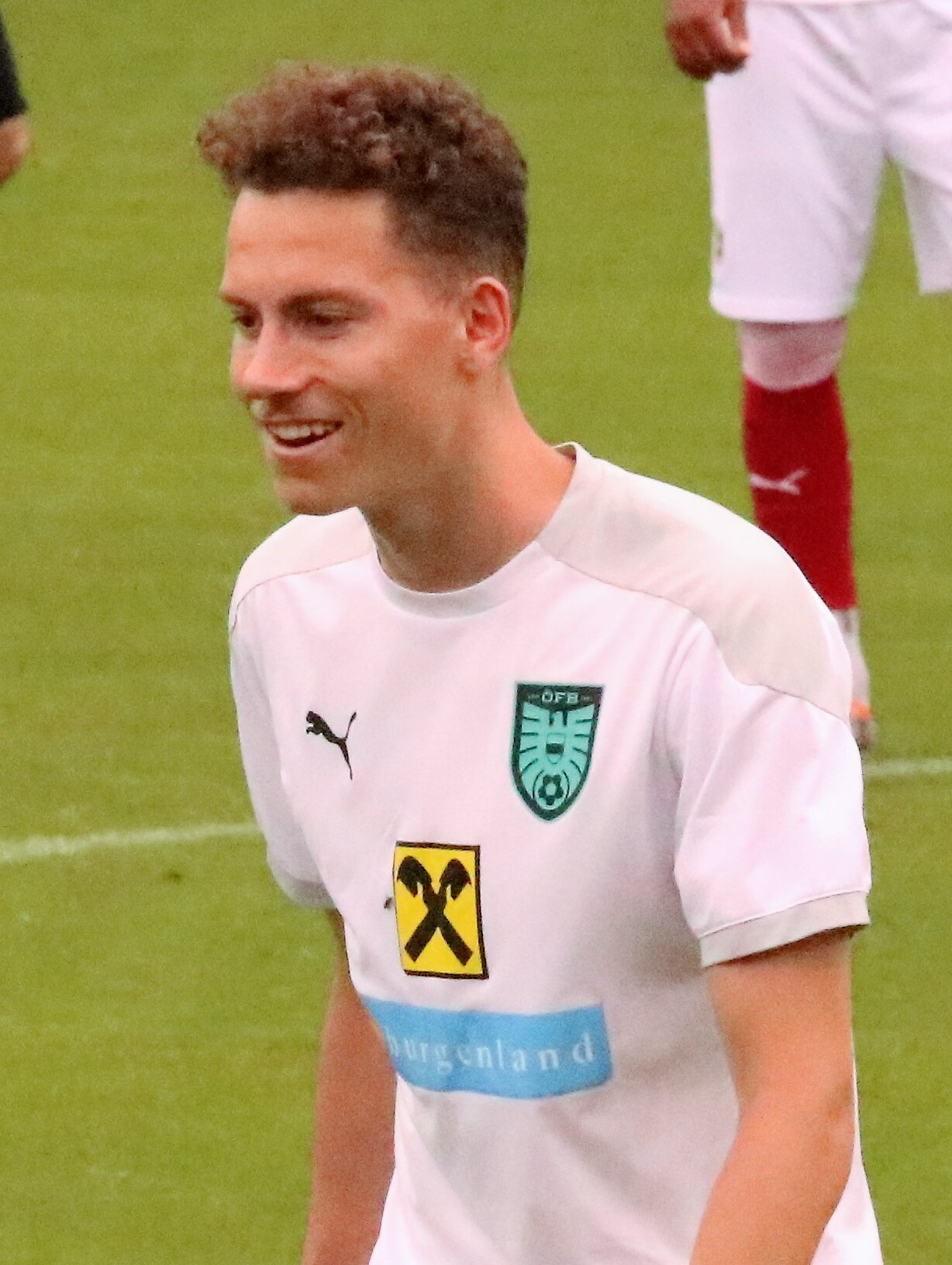
- Seiwald in 2022

Personal information
- Date of birth: 20 August 2000 (age 26)
- Place of birth: Salzburg, Austria
- Height: 1.88 m (6 ft 2 in)
- Position: Left-back

Team information
- Current team: Union Gurten

Youth career
- 2007–2014: USC Flachau
- 2014–2019: Ried

Senior career*
Years	Team	Apps	(Gls)
2019–2023	Ried II	30	(2)
2020–2023	Ried	24	(0)
2021	→ Vorwärts Steyr (loan)	15	(0)
2022–2023	→ First Vienna (loan)	16	(0)
2023–2024	Floridsdorfer AC	28	(2)
2025–	Union Gurten	44	(6)

International career
2021	Austria U21	2	(0)
- * Club domestic league appearances and goals as of 27 June 2026

Felix Seiwald (born 20 August 2000) is an Austrian professional footballer who plays as a left-back for Austrian Regionalliga club Union Gurten.

== Career ==
Seiwald is a product of the youth academies of Flachau and Ried. He began his senior career with the reserves of Ried in 2019, signing his first professional contract on 17 June 2019 before being promoted to the first team in 2020. On 8 February 2021, he joined Vorwärts Steyr on loan for 1.5 years. He was recalled early to Ried on 30 June 2021 to train with their first team, earning Vorwärts Steyr some compensation.

On 13 July 2023, Seiwald signed a one-season contract with Floridsdorfer AC.

In September 2024, Seiwald announced that he ended his playing career at the age of 24 to focus on his studies.

Four months later, Seiwald came out of the retirement and joined Union Gurten in the third-tier Austrian Regionalliga.

== International career ==
Seiwald is a youth international for Austria, having been called up to represent the Austria U21s in October 2021.

== Honours ==
Ried

- 2. Liga: 2019–20
