= FC Wacker Innsbruck (2002) =

Austrian football club, based in Innsbruck

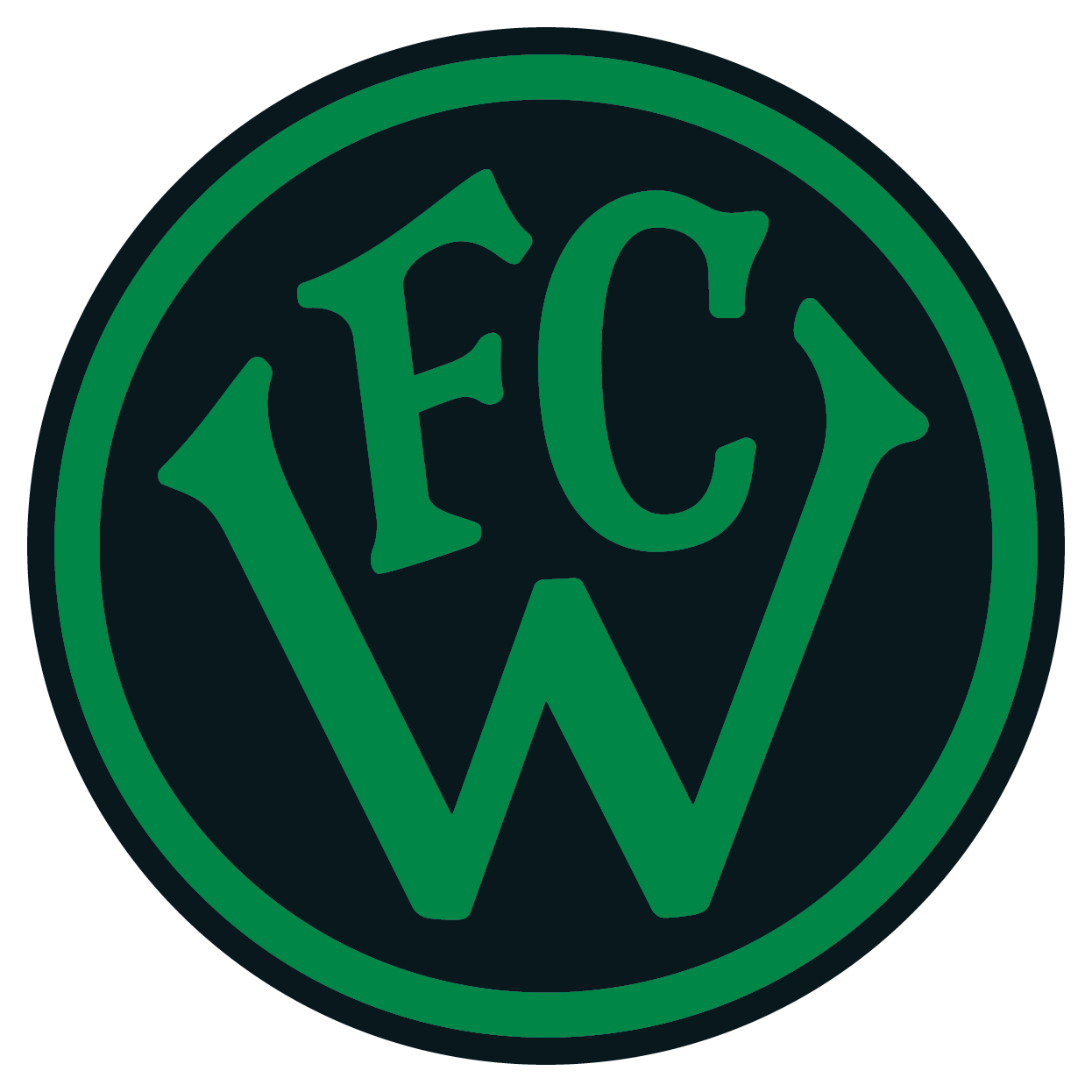
- Full name: Fußballclub Wacker Innsbruck
- Founded: 21 June 2002; 24 years ago
- Ground: Tivoli-Neu, Innsbruck
- Capacity: 16,008
- Chairman: Johannes Rauch
- Manager: Sebastian Siller
- League: 2. Liga
- 2025–26: Austrian Regionalliga West, 1st (promoted)
Home colours	Away colours

FC Wacker Innsbruck is an Austrian association football club from Innsbruck. The club was formed in June 2002 as FC Wacker Tirol, and play their home games at Tivoli-Neu. The club regard themselves as the spiritual continuation of the team FC Tirol Innsbruck, which went bankrupt in 2002, and the original FC Wacker Innsbruck, which was founded in 1913 (1913, 1914 or 1915, the founding day is uncertain). In honour of this heritage, FC Wacker Tirol was renamed FC Wacker Innsbruck in 2007.

== History ==
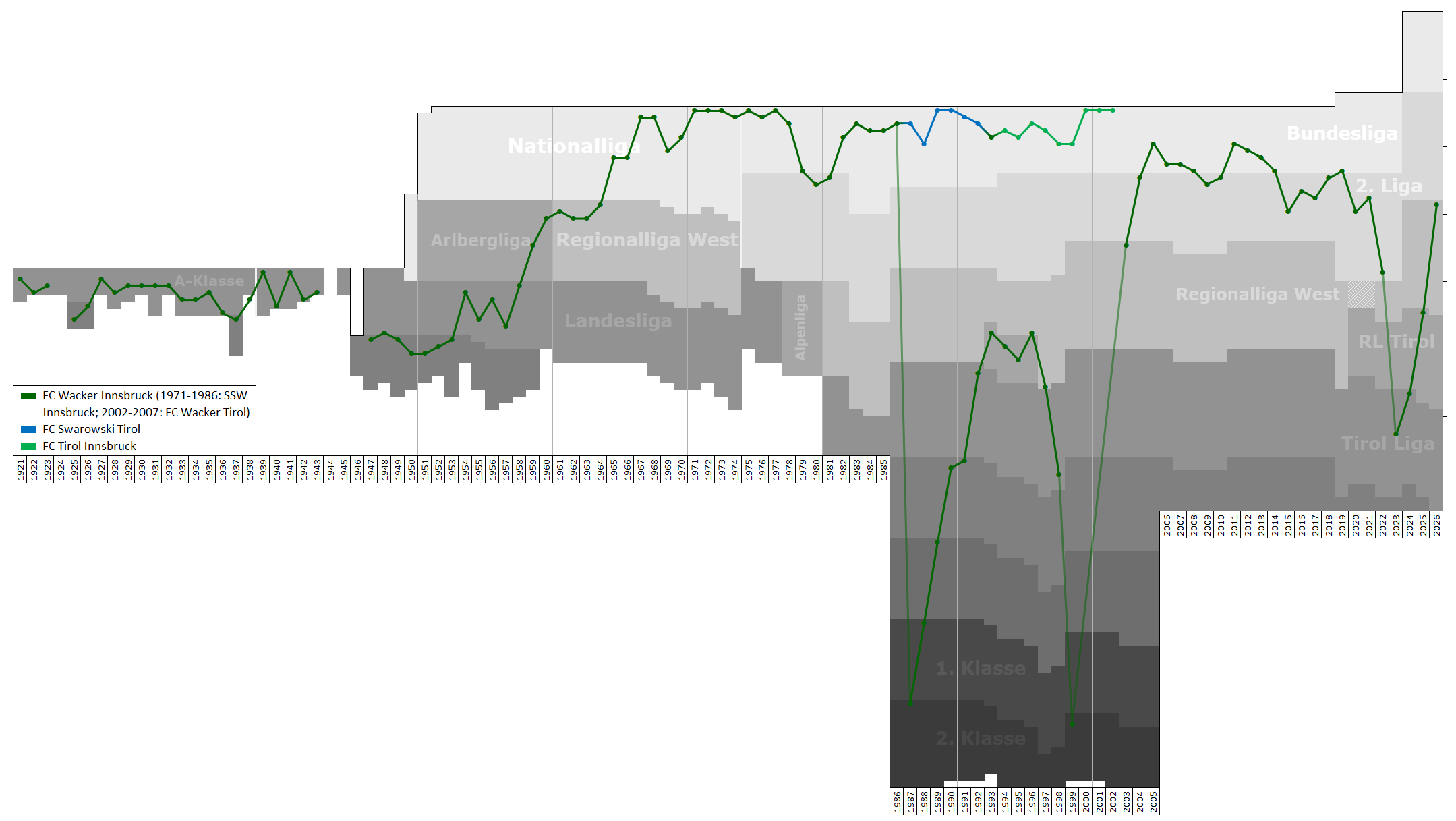
Historical chart of FC Wacker Innsbruck league performance (incl. predecessor clubs)

The ascent of Wacker Tirol into the Bundesliga took only two years from formation, with promotion to the top division achieved in 2004. This was possible because the club made an alliance with 3rd league club Wattens and thus avoided starting in the bottom league. After finishing first in Regionalliga West (2002–03), Wacker advanced to Red Zac Erste Liga, and only a season later (2003–04) was promoted to Bundesliga.

FC Wacker Tirol finished 6th out of 10 in their first Bundesliga season (2004–05) and 7th in their second (2005–06). In 2006–07, the Tyroleans avoided relegation only because Grazer AK went into administration and was docked 28 points as a result. One year later (2008) the club, now named FC Wacker Innsbruck, finished last and was relegated to the Austrian Football Second League.

After finishing runner-up in the 2008–09 season, FC Wacker Innsbruck won promotion back to the Austrian Bundesliga in 2010 in a tight run. About 5000 Tyrolean supporters had travelled to the final away game on 28 May 2010 in Pasching against Red Bull Juniors, which FC Wacker Innsbruck won 2–0.

Older logo used from 2014

As in 2004–05, FC Wacker Innsbruck finished their first Bundesliga season (2010–11) again 6th and then 7th in 2011–12 when they had been close to the Europa League spots for much of the season. After a disastrous start into the 2012–13 season (ten losses in eleven matches) it seemed unlikely that the club could avoid relegation. In a dramatic season finale against relegation which involved four teams, FC Wacker Innsbruck on 26 May 2013 managed to turn a 0–2 against Wolfsberger AC into a 3–2 victory within 10 minutes and, thanks to this miracle of Wolfsberg stayed in the league. With one-year delay FC Wacker Innsbruck finishing last in 2013–14, 8 points behind FC Admira Wacker Mödling which even had been docked 5 points due to financial problems.

In 2014–15, Wacker Innsbruck played in the First League but failed to gain promotion. Consequently, FC Wacker Innsbruck start the 2015–16 season on the First League. FC Wacker Innsbruck start the 2018–19 season on the First League.

After the 2021–22 season where Wacker Innsbruck finished in mid-table, the club did not apply for a licence for the next season, and decided not to file a complaint with the Permanent Neutral Arbitration Court. This placed the club at the bottom of the table and thus they were relegated to the Tiroler Liga, a fourth-tier division.

== Seasons ==
Season	League	Place	W	D	L	GF	GA	Pts	Notes
2002–03	Fußball-Regionalliga (III)	1	26	2	2	101	17	80	Alliance with WSG Wattens
2003–04	Erste Liga (II)	1	22	6	8	65	44	72	
2004–05	Bundesliga (I)	6	11	11	14	48	48	44	
2005–06	Bundesliga	7	10	12	14	44	55	42	
2006–07	Bundesliga	9	8	10	18	40	64	34	avoided relegation only because of bankrupt GAK
2007–08	Bundesliga	10	6	11	19	32	63	29	
2008–09	Erste Liga (II)	2	18	8	7	65	44	62	
2009–10	Erste Liga	1	21	6	6	67	26	69	
2010–11	Bundesliga (I)	6	13	11	12	43	42	50	
2011–12	Bundesliga	7	10	15	11	36	45	45	
2012–13	Bundesliga	8	11	3	22	41	75	36	
2013–14	Bundesliga	10	5	14	17	42	70	29	
2014–15	Erste Liga	6	11	10	15	32	43	43	
2015–16	Erste Liga	3	17	8	11	61	47	59	
2016–17	Erste Liga	4	15	9	12	58	53	54	
2017–18	Erste Liga	1	21	8	7	60	31	71	
2018–19	Bundesliga	12	4	5	13	17	34	17	Regular Season
2018–19	Bundesliga	6	8	5	19	32	51	20	Relegation Round
2019–20	2. Liga	6	13	5	12	44	49	44	
2020–21	2. Liga	4	17	6	7	50	33	57	
2021–22	2. Liga	9	11	7	12	46	41	40	Did not apply for a new licence
2022–23	Tiroler Liga (IV)	7	12	9	9	50	46	45	
2023–24	Tiroler Liga (V)	1	21	4	1	85	19	67	Tiroler Liga restructured to 5th tier
2024–25	Regionalliga Tirol (IV)	1	22	4	0	95	8	70	
2025–26	Austrian Regionalliga (III)	1	28	2	2	88	18	86	Regionalliga West
Green marks a season followed by promotion, red a season followed by relegation.

== Current squad ==
As of 4 September 2026

Note: Flags indicate national team as defined under FIFA eligibility rules; some limited exceptions apply. Players may hold more than one non-FIFA nationality.

No.	Pos.	Nation	Player
1	GK	AUT	Lukas Tauber
2	DF	AUT	Max Köchl
3	DF	AUT	Alexander Böck
4	MF	NGR	Daniel Francis
5	DF	GER	Phil Kunze
6	DF	AUT	Manuel Petutschnig
7	FW	IDN	Adrian Wibowo (on loan from Los Angeles FC)
8	MF	GUA	Matt Evans (on loan from Los Angeles FC)
9	FW	AUT	Okan Yılmaz
10	MF	AUT	Rami Tekir (captain)
11	MF	AUT	Raphael Gallé
15	MF	SEN	Mouhamed Sy
16	DF	AUT	Alexander Joppich
17	FW	AUT	Christopher Weinzierl
18	FW	ITA	Adrian Lechl

No.	Pos.	Nation	Player
19	DF	AUT	Florian Kopp
20	FW	WAL	Gabriele Biancheri
21	DF	GER	Robin Littig
22	FW	AUT	Luis Gstrein
24	FW	GHA	Bright Owusu
25	DF	AUT	Tobias Berger
27	DF	GER	Quirin Rackl
28	DF	ECU	Virgilio Olaya (on loan from Los Angeles FC)
29	FW	URU	Anderson Rodríguez (on loan from Grasshopper)
30	GK	GER	Benjamin Ballis
33	GK	AUT	Juri Kirchmayr (on loan from Grazer AK)
39	GK	UKR	Kyrylo Danilyev
99	FW	ALG	Yanis Guermouche
—	GK	AUT	Gerald Kirchebner

=== Out on loan ===
Note: Flags indicate national team as defined under FIFA eligibility rules; some limited exceptions apply. Players may hold more than one non-FIFA nationality.

No.	Pos.	Nation	Player

== Managers ==
- (Austria) Michael Streiter (1 July 2002 – 30 June 2003)
- (Austria) Helmut Kraft (1 June 2003 – 9 November 2004)
- (Russia) Stanislav Cherchesov (10 Nov 2004 – 31 May 2006)
- (Czech Republic) František Straka (1 June 2006 – 19 April 2007)
- (Austria) Klaus Vogler (interim) (20 April 2007 – 30 June 2007)
- (Denmark) Lars Søndergaard (1 July 2007 – 22 October 2007)
- (Austria) Helmut Kraft (22 Oct 2007 – 30 April 2008)
- (Austria) Walter Kogler (1 June 2008 – 10 October 2012)
- (Austria) Werner Löberbauer (interim) (10 Oct 2012 – 16 October 2012)
- (Austria) Roland Kirchler (16 Oct 2012 – 16 December 2013)
- (Austria) Florian Klausner (interim) (16 Dec 2013 – 18 December 2013)
- (Austria) Michael Streiter (27 Dec 2013 – 22 October 2014)
- (Austria) Florian Klausner (interim) (22 Oct 2014 – 25 November 2014)
- (Austria) Klaus Schmidt (25 Nov 2014 – 21 May 2016)
- (Austria) Andreas Schrott (interim) (21 May 2016 – 26 June 2016)
- (Switzerland) Maurizio Jacobacci (27 June 2016 – 21 September 2016)
- (Austria) Thomas Grumser (21 September 2016 – 31 December 2016)
- (Austria) Karl Daxbacher (5 January 2017 – 5 March 2019)
- (Austria) Thomas Grumser (5 March 2019 – 31 July 2020)
- (Germany) Daniel Bierofka (1 August 2020 – 7 October 2021)
- (Japan) Masaki Morass (interim) (10 October 2021 – 27 January 2022)
- (Germany) Michael Oenning (29 January 2022 – 30 June 2022)
- (Austria) Akif Güclü (11 July 2022 – 10 April 2023)
- (Austria) Sebastian Siller (15 April 2023 – )
