= Heinz Hochhauser =

Austrian football manager

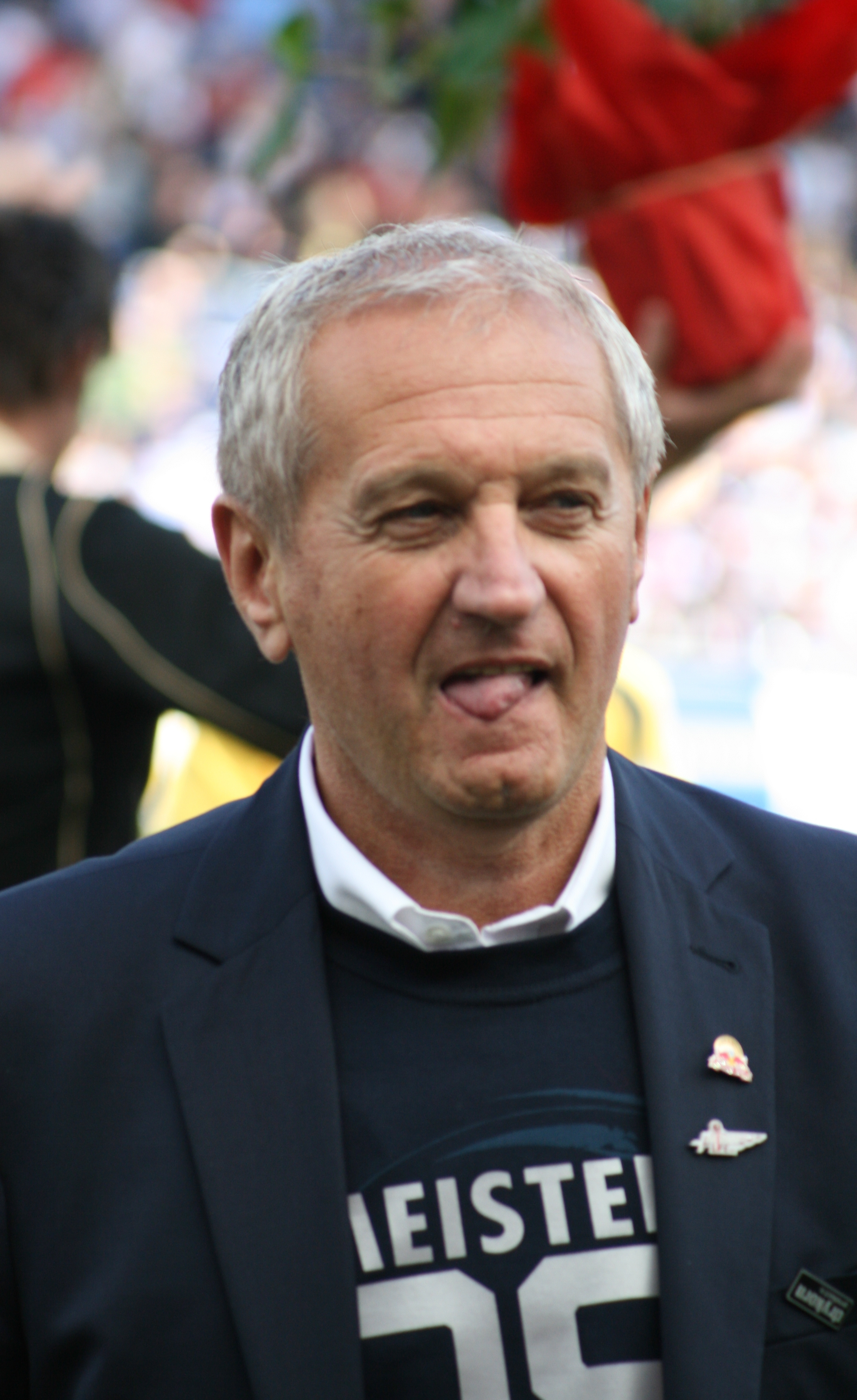

Personal information
- Date of birth: 6 February 1947
- Place of birth: Wels, Austria
- Height: 1.72 m (5 ft 8 in)

Managerial career
- Years: Team
- 1995–1996: FC Linz
- 1999–2000: SV Ried
- 2000–2001: FK Austria Wien
- 2002: FC Kärnten
- 2003: FC Superfund
- 2004–2006: SV Ried

Heinz Hochhauser (born 6 February 1947) is an Austrian football manager.
