= Nikola Stošić =

Serbian footballer

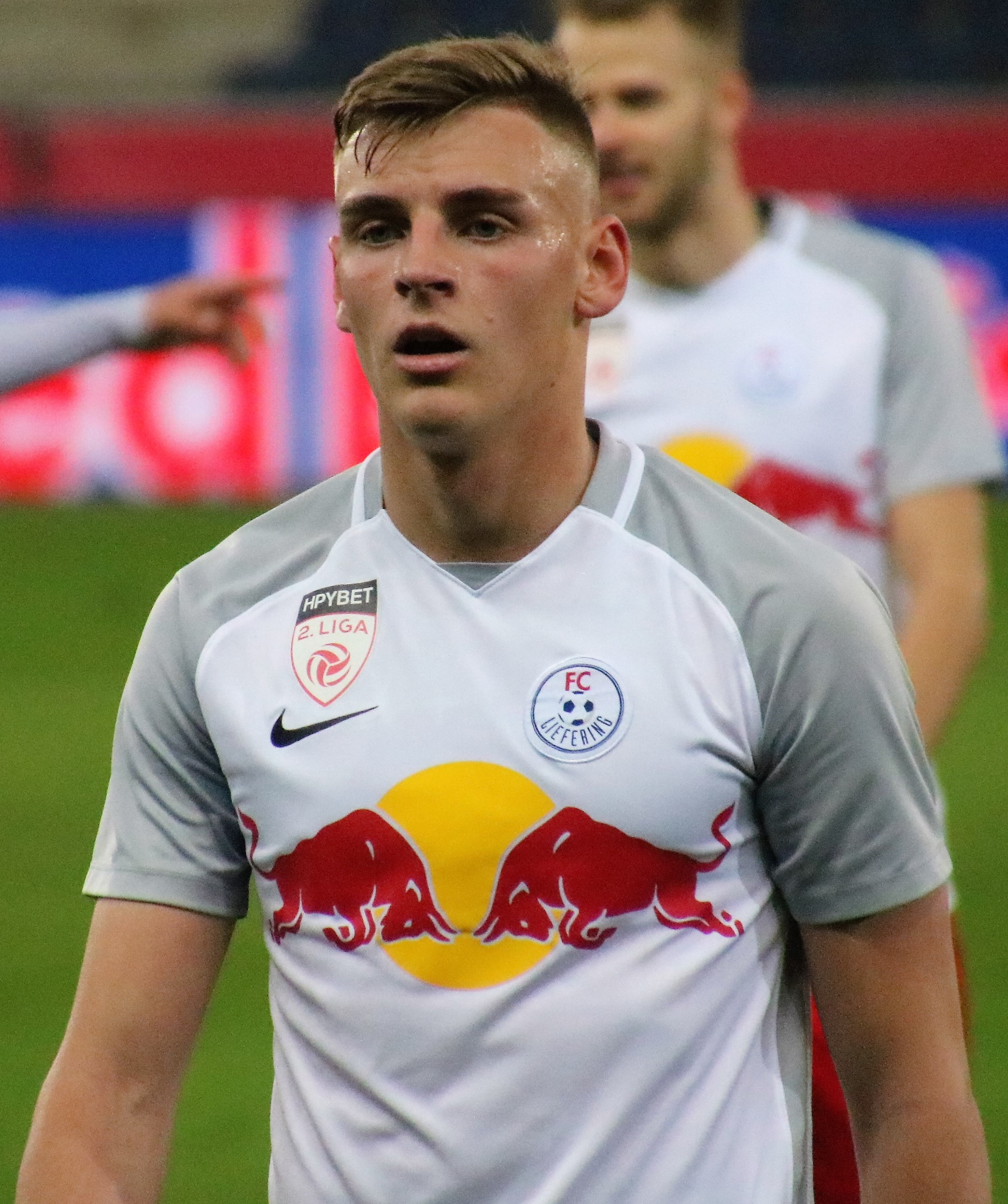
- Stosic in 2019

Personal information
- Date of birth: 29 January 2000 (age 26)
- Place of birth: Salzburg, Austria
- Height: 1.80 m (5 ft 11 in)
- Position: Midfielder

Team information
- Current team: Sturm Graz II
- Number: 37

Youth career
- 2007: 1. Salzburger SK 1919
- 2007–2012: Red Bull Salzburg
- 2012–2013: FC Liefering
- 2013–2018: Red Bull Salzburg

Senior career*
Years	Team	Apps	(Gls)
2017–2021	FC Liefering	50	(4)
2021–2024	SV Ried	42	(0)
2023–2024	SV Ried II	5	(0)
2024–	Sturm Graz II	40	(1)

International career
	Serbia U15	2	(0)
2016	Serbia U16	1	(0)
- * Club domestic league appearances and goals as of 12 June 2025

Nikola Stošić (Serbian: Никола Стошић, born 29 January 2000) is a Serbian professional footballer who plays as midfielder for 2. Liga club Sturm Graz II.

== Career ==
On 6 February 2024, Stošić signed with SK Sturm Graz and was assigned to their reserves team that plays in 2. Liga.
