= Robert Ibertsberger =

Austrian footballer and manager

Personal information
- Date of birth: 20 January 1977 (age 49)
- Place of birth: Neumarkt am Wallersee, Austria
- Height: 1.79 m (5 ft 10 in)
- Position: Defender

Team information
- Current team: Kosovo (assistant)

Youth career
- 1984–1991: SV Seekirchen
- 1991–1994: BNZ Salzburg

Senior career*
Years	Team	Apps	(Gls)
1994–1996	FC Puch	41	(1)
1996–1999	Austria Salzburg	70	(4)
2000–2003	Venezia	4	(0)
2000–2001	→ Sturm Graz (loan)	22	(0)
2001–2002	→ Tirol Innsbruck (loan)	14	(0)
2003–2004	SC Untersiebenbrunn	7	(0)
Total		158	(5)

International career
1997–1999	Austria U21	7	(0)
1999–2001	Austria	8	(0)

Managerial career
- 2006–2008: Red Bull Salzburg U15
- 2008–2010: Red Bull Salzburg U17
- 2010–2011: SV Ried (U18)
- 2010–2017: SV Ried (staff)
- 2013: SV Ried (coach)
- 2017–2018: Wolfsberger AC (assistant)
- 2018: Wolfsberger AC (caretaker)
- 2018–2019: Austria Wien (assistant)
- 2019: Austria Wien (caretaker)
- 2020–2021: St. Pölten
- 2022: SV Ried
- 2024–: Kosovo (assistant)
- * Club domestic league appearances and goals

Robert Ibertsberger (born 20 January 1977) is an Austrian football manager and former player who is the assistant manager of Kosovo national team. He is the brother of Andreas Ibertsberger. He had to retire in 2004 due to serious knee injury.

== Coaching career ==
Robert Ibertsberger became assistant manager of Wolfsberger AC in 2017. He then was appointed manager of Wolfsberg on 26 March 2018 and was manager until the end of the 2017–18 season. His first match was a 2–0 loss to Red Bull Salzburg. Ibertsberger left Wolfsberg to become assistant manager of Austria Wien. On 11 March 2019, Ibertsberger again replaced an outgoing manager. He replaced Thomas Letsch at Austria Wien. His first match was a 1–0 loss to Sturm Graz. He became manager of SKN St. Pölten on 9 March 2020. St. Pölten finished the 2019–20 season with five wins in ten league matches. St. Pölten's 2020–21 season started with a 3–1 win against ATSV Wolfsberg.

Inbertsberger was hired by SV Ried in January 2022 and then fired on 19 April 2022.

== Managerial record ==
As of match played 31 January 2021

Team	From	To	Record								Ref.
Team	From	To	M	W	D	L	GF	GA	GD	Win %	Ref.
Wolfsberger AC	26 March 2018	30 June 2018	9	4	1	4	11	13	−2	44.44	
Austria Wien	11 March 2019	30 June 2019	11	3	3	5	16	21	−5	27.27	
SKN St. Pölten	9 March 2020	present	27	10	6	11	47	44	+3	37.04	
Total			47	17	10	20	74	78	−4	36.17	—
