= Christian Heinle =

Austrian football manager (born 1985)

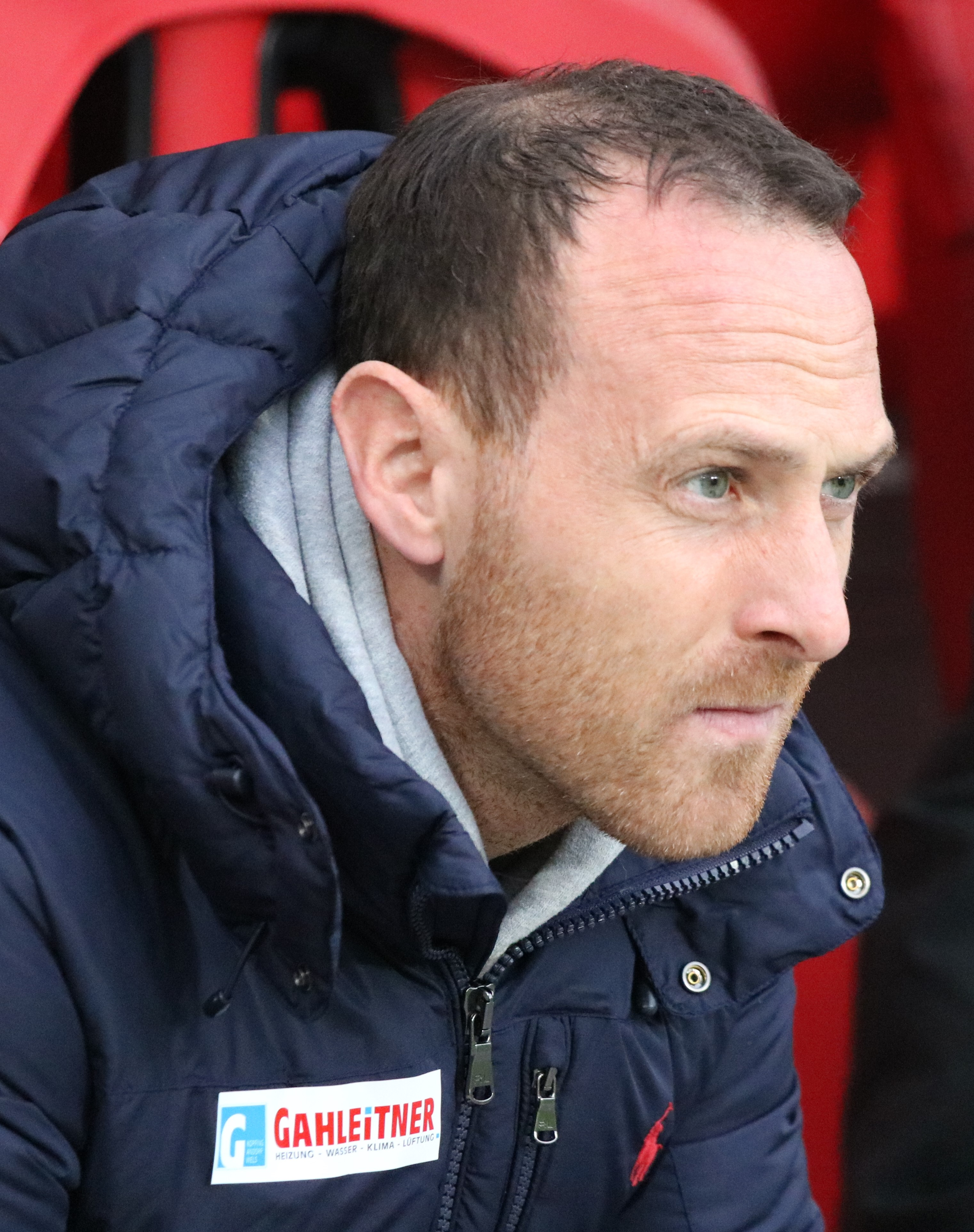
- Heinle in 2023

Personal information
- Date of birth: 30 March 1985 (age 41)
- Place of birth: Grieskirchen, Austria
- Position: Forward

Youth career
- 1993–?: Grieskirchen

Senior career*
Years	Team	Apps	(Gls)
–2003	Grieskirchen		
2003–2012	SV Bad Schallerbach	147	(39)
2012–2017	Union Rottenbach	95	(20)
2017–2020	Grieskirchen II	19	(11)
2017–2020	Grieskirchen	46	(6)

Managerial career
- 2015–2017: Union Rottenbach (player coach)
- 2017–2020: Grieskirchen (player coach)
- 2020–2021: Ried II (coach)
- 2021–2022: Ried (co-manager)
- 2021: Ried (caretaker)
- 2022–2023: Ried
- 2025–: FC Hertha Wels
- * Club domestic league appearances and goals

Christian Heinle (born 30 March 1985) is an Austrian football manager and former player.

== Career ==
Heinle played for SV Grieskirchen, SV Bad Schallerbach and Union Rottenbach in lower classes in Upper Austria. After the 2020–21 season he ended his career.

2014–15 he started as assistant coach to his father at Union Rottenbach, where he was also acting as a player. 2015–16 he became playing coach of Rottenbach. In 2017–18 he became player coach of SV Grieskirchen.

In 2020–21, he went to SV Ried and became head coach of the second team. January 2021 he became assistant coach to Miron Muslic in the first team, but stayed head coach of the second team. Also under the head-coach Andreas Heraf he stayed as assistant. In November 2021 he became caretaker of the first team. In the winter of 2021 Robert Ibertsberger became new coach of Ried, and Heinle again worked as assistant.

In April 2022, Heinle replaced Robert Ibertsberger as head coach in the Austrian Football Bundesliga. He was dismissed after a series of poor results in March 2023.

In May 2025, Heinle became the head coach of FC Hertha Wels ahead of the 2025–26 Austrian Second League.
