= Philipp Pomer =

Austrian association footballer

Personal information
- Date of birth: 12 August 1997 (age 29)
- Place of birth: Vienna, Austria
- Height: 1.80 m (5 ft 11 in)
- Position: Winger

Team information
- Current team: Ried
- Number: 17

Youth career
- 2003–2011: Favoritner AC
- 2011–2013: Austria Wien

Senior career*
Years	Team	Apps	(Gls)
2013–2015	Favoritner AC	47	(5)
2015–2016	Elektra Wien	25	(8)
2016–2019	Ebreichsdorf	66	(28)
2019–2021	Blau-Weiß Linz	48	(10)
2021–	Ried	127	(13)
- * Club domestic league appearances and goals as of 10 June 2026

Philipp Pomer (born 12 August 1997) is an Austrian professional footballer who plays as a winger for Ried.

== Career ==
Pomer is a product of the youth academie of Favoritner AC and Austria Wien. He began his senior career with Favoritner, before moving to Elektra Wien in 2015. In 2016, he transferred to Ebreichsdorf. In the 2018–19 season, he scored 17 goals in 25 games with Ebreichsdorf, earning him a move to the 2. Liga with Blau-Weiß Linz on 29 May 2019. On 25 May 2021, he transferred to the Austrian Football Bundesliga club Ried, signing a contract until 2023.
