= 1997–98 Austrian Cup =

Tournament details
- Country: Austria

Final positions
- Champions: SV Ried
- Runners-up: Sturm Graz

The 1997–98 Austrian Cup (German: ÖFB-Cup) was the 64th season of Austria's nationwide football cup competition. The final was held at the Ernst-Happel-Stadion, Vienna on 19 May 1998.

The competition was won by SV Ried after beating Sturm Graz 3–1.

== First round ==
Team 1	Score	Team 2
10 August 1997
Union Ostermiething	2–3 (a.e.t.)	Donau Linz
12 August 1997
Dornbirner SV	0–3	Salzburger AK 1914
ESV Saalfelden	0–6	SV Wörgl
FC Koblach	3–0	SV Seekirchen
FC Lustenau 07	3–1	SPG Rum
FC ÖMV Stadlau	0–2	ASK Kottingbrunn
Polizei SV/SW Salzburg	0–1	Austria Salzburg Amateure
SV Fügen	2–6	Schwarz-Weiß Bregenz
SV Horn	3–1	Landstraßer AC Wien
Union St. Florian	2–0	SV Grieskirchen
13 August 1997
FC Gratkorn	5–1	Union Esternberg
FC Zeltweg	2–0	SAK Klagenfurt
ISS Admira Landhaus	2–0	Hellas Kagran
Post SV Wien	2–4 (a.e.t.)	SV Langenrohr
SC Kundl	4–1	SV Kirchbichl
14 August 1997
SC Breitenfeld	1–6	Eintracht Wels
SC Marchtrenk	1–3	SK Vorwärts Steyr
SV Rohrbach	3–2	1. SV Wiener Neudorf
ASV Schrems	0–3	SV Mattersburg
UFC St. Peter/Au	0–2	Prater SV
15 August 1997
ASK Klingenbach	0–1	ASV Hohenau
Austria XI Wien	2–6	ASK Stoob
FC St. Veit	2–1	SK St. Magdalena
Fortuna 05 Wien	1–2	SC Untersiebenbrunn
Grün Weiß Micheldorf	0–5	TSV Hartberg
Kapfenberger SV	3–1	SV Flavia Solva
SV Oberndorf	1–7	SV Stockerau
SC Eisenstadt	2–0	SV Gerasdorf
SC Enzersfeld	1–2	UFC Tadten
SC Fürstenfeld	1–0	DSV Leoben
SV Leibnitz	1–2 (a.e.t.)	SV Braunau
SV Lendorf	4–1	Welser SC Hertha
SV Würmla	3-2 (a.e.t.)	Kremser SC
SVG Bleiburg	1–2 (a.e.t.)	SV Alpine Kindberg
FC St. Michael/Lavanttal	2–0	ATSV Irdning
TSV Pöllau	2–1	FC Blau-Weiß Linz
16 August 1997
FC Tirol Innsbruck Amateure	2–3	SC Rheindorf Altach
Friesacher AC	0–2	ASK Voitsberg
SG Simmering/FavAC	1–2	First Vienna FC
SR Donaufeld	0–0 (a.e.t.) (3–1 p)	VSE St. Pölten
SV Bürmoos	0–4	WSG Wattens
Union Rohrbach/Berg	0–4	SV Spittal/Drau
17 August 1997
FC Dornbirn	0–1	FC Kufstein

== Second round ==
Team 1	Score	Team 2
25 August 1997
SC Untersiebenbrunn	4–1	SV Langenrohr
26 August 1997
FC Koblach	1–2	SC Kundl
FC Hard	1–3	SC Rheindorf Altach
SV Horn	3–5 (a.e.t.)	ASK Kottingbrunn
SV Wörgl	1–2	Salzburger AK 1914
27 August 1997
FC Lustenau 07	0–3	Schwarz-Weiß Bregenz
Union St. Florian	2–2 (a.e.t.) (4–2 p)	Eintracht Wels
29 August 1997
FC Zeltweg	1–4	FC Gratkorn
Kapfenberger SV	1–0	TSV Hartberg
Prater SV	3–1 (a.e.t.)	SR Donaufeld
Austria Salzburg Amateure	0–1	WSG Wattens
SV Lendorf	0–0 (a.e.t.) (5–3 p)	SV Braunau
SV Rohrbach	1–2	SV Stockerau
TSV Pöllau	2–2 (a.e.t.) (4–5 p)	SV Spittal/Drau
30 August 1997
ASK Stoob	5–0	ASV Hohenau
ASK Voitsberg	5–0	SC Fürstenfeld
Donau Linz	3–1 (a.e.t.)	FC St. Michael/Lavanttal
FC St. Veit	2–4 (a.e.t.)	SK Vorwärts Steyr
ISS Admira Landhaus	0–1	SC Eisenstadt
SV Alpine Kindberg	1–5	FC Kufstein
SV Mattersburg	0–2	DSV Leoben
UFC Tadten	0–6	First Vienna FC

== Third round ==
Team 1	Score	Team 2
26 September 1997
FC Gratkorn	1–1 (a.e.t.) (3–4 p)	SV Stockerau
FC Kufstein	0–2	Schwarz-Weiß Bregenz
SC Eisenstadt	1–3	First Vienna FC
SC Untersiebenbrunn	2–0	ASK Kottingbrun
Union St. Florian	1–2	SV Spittal/Drau
27 September 1997
ASK Stoob	0–1	FK Austria Wien
ASK Voitsberg	0–0 (a.e.t.) (3–5 p)	Grazer AK
Donau Linz	1–5	LASK
Kapfenberger SV	0–4	SK Sturm Graz
Prater SV	1–3	SK Rapid Wien
SC Kundl	0–5	SV Austria Salzburg
SC Rheindorf Altach	0–4	SV Ried
SV Lendorf	1–2	SK Vorwärts Steyr
SV Würmla	0–5	VfB Admira/Wacker Mödling
Salzburger AK 1914	1–4	FC Tirol Innsbruck
WSG Wattens	1–0	SC Austria Lustenau

== Fourth round ==
Team 1	Score	Team 2
31 October 1997
FC Tirol Innsbruck	2–1	Grazer AK
1 November 1997
SK Rapid Wien	1–0	FK Austria Wien
SC Untersiebenbrunn	1–3	VfB Admira/Wacker Mödling
SV Stockerau	0–4	SK Sturm Graz
Schwarz-Weiß Bregenz	3–2	SV Spittal/Drau
First Vienna FC	0–1	SV Ried
SK Vorwärts Steyr	0–0 (a.e.t.) (7–8 p)	DSV Leoben
WSG Wattens	0–2 (a.e.t.)	LASK

== Quarter-finals ==
Team 1	Score	Team 2
8 April 1998
FC Tirol Innsbruck	0–1	LASK
SK Rapid Wien	1–2	VfB Admira/Wacker Mödling
SV Austria Salzburg	0–1 (a.e.t.)	SK Sturm Graz
SV Ried	3–2	Schwarz-Weiß Bregenz

== Semi-finals ==
Team 1	Score	Team 2
5 May 1998
SK Sturm Graz	2–0	LASK
VfB Admira/Wacker Mödling	0–1 (a.e.t.)	SV Ried

== Final ==
19 May 1998
20:30

SV Ried	3–1	SK Sturm Graz
Stanisavljević 11' (pen.); Drechsel 32'; Scharrer 89'	Report	Reinmayr 88'

Ernst-Happel-Stadion, Vienna
Attendance: 6,000
Referee: Günter Benkö
