= SV Ried =

- Full name: Sportvereinigung Ried von 1912
- Founded: 5 May 1912; 114 years ago
- Ground: BWT X Upper Austrian Arena
- Capacity: 7,680
- Chairman: Helmuth Riedl
- Manager: Mario Despotovic
- League: Austrian Bundesliga
- 2025–26: Austrian Bundesliga, 7th of 12
- Website: www.svried.at
Home colours	Away colours

SV Ried, commonly known as SV Oberbank Ried for sponsorship reasons, is an Austrian association football club based in Ried im Innkreis, Upper Austria. The team plays its home matches at Josko Arena, a stadium with a capacity of 7,680. The team plays in the Austrian Football Bundesliga, the top tier of the Austrian football league system.

== History ==
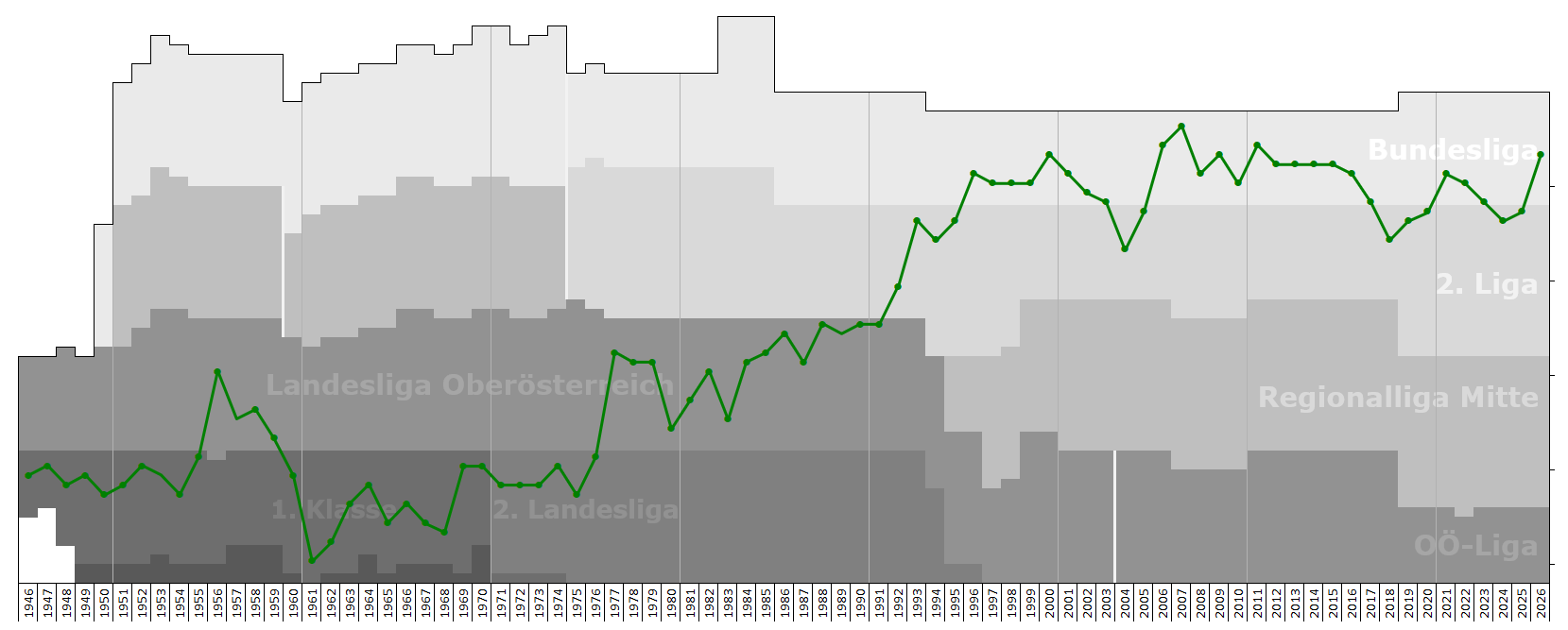
Historical chart of SV Ried league performance

The club formed on 5 May 1912 as Sportvereinigung Ried, and played in the regional leagues of Upper Austria until 1991, when they ascended to the national leagues for the first time. SV Ried first achieved promotion to the highest level of Austrian football in 1995.

SV Ried gained their first major honour in 1998 when they won the Austrian Cup, beating Sturm Graz 3–1 in the final. In 2003, Ried were relegated, ending an eight-year spell in the top division. Two seasons later, Ried regained Bundesliga status, becoming champions of the Erste Liga on 23 May 2005 following a 3–2 victory over Kapfenberg. In the following season (2005–06) Ried achieved their highest league finish so far, fourth, in the Bundesliga. The year after they managed to improve once more finishing second and becoming vice-champion. After the first third of the season, the team seemed to battle against relegation and was stuck in the last place for five game weeks. The club management however kept trusting in Helmut Kraft's coaching abilities, which would turn out to be the right decision after all. Twelve matches without a loss in the second third of the season and five wins out of the last five matches from match weeks 32–36 guaranteed the club's highest league finish of second place and a spot in the first qualifying round of the UEFA Cup.

In the 2022–23 season, SV Ried finished in last place, leading to their relegation from the Austrian Bundesliga to the Austrian Second League for the 2023–24. This marked their descent after three consecutive seasons in the top tier.

== Honours ==
- Austrian Cup
  - Winners: 1997–98, 2010–11
- Austrian 2. Liga
  - Champions: 2004–05, 2019–20, 2024–25

== Players ==
=== Current squad ===
As of 18 September 2026

Note: Flags indicate national team as defined under FIFA eligibility rules; some limited exceptions apply. Players may hold more than one non-FIFA nationality.

No.	Pos.	Nation	Player
1	GK	AUT	Andreas Leitner (captain)
4	MF	AUT	Lukas Malicsek
5	DF	AUT	Dejan Radonjić
6	MF	RSA	Yusuf Maart
7	DF	AUT	Oliver Sorg
8	MF	AUT	Martin Rasner
9	FW	MLI	Niama Pape Sissoko (on loan from Reims)
10	MF	IRQ	Jussef Nasrawe
11	MF	RSA	Jaedin Rhodes
12	FW	AUT	Ante Bajic
15	FW	AUT	Joris Boguo
17	MF	AUT	Philipp Pomer
18	MF	AUT	Fabian Rossdorfer
19	FW	DEN	Tobias Lund Jensen (on loan from Club NXT)
21	FW	CRO	Tino Kusanović (on loan from 1. FC Nürnberg)
22	MF	AUT	Stefan Schwab

No.	Pos.	Nation	Player
24	FW	AUT	Sefiwu Abubakar
28	DF	FRO	Samuel Chukwudi
29	DF	CRO	Luka Capan
30	DF	GER	Oliver Steurer
33	DF	AUT	Alessandro Goiginger
34	GK	AUT	Dominik Stöger
38	MF	GER	Nermin Mesic
40	MF	KOS	Leonit Zeqiri
42	MF	AUT	Fabian Lechner
47	FW	AUT	Evan Eghosa Aisowieren
48	FW	AUT	Raphael Pesu
72	MF	GER	Conrad Scholl
77	GK	AUT	Felix Wimmer
92	FW	SWE	Isaac Kiese Thelin
—	GK	BIH	Hidajet Hankić

=== Out on loan ===
Note: Flags indicate national team as defined under FIFA eligibility rules; some limited exceptions apply. Players may hold more than one non-FIFA nationality.

No. / Pos. / Nation / Player; — / DF / AUT / Philip Weissenbacher (at Kapfenberger SV until 30 June 2027)	No. / Pos. / Nation / Player; — / MF / AUT / Nevio Zotz (at Hertha Wels until 30 June 2027)

=== Retired numbers ===
27 – (Austria) Sanel Kuljić, striker (2003–06)

== Club officials ==
Position	Staff
Chairman	(Austria) Helmuth Riedl
President	(Austria)
Chief Executive Officer	(Austria)
Director of Sport	(Austria)
Director of Football	(Austria) Thomas Reifeltshammer
Manager	(Austria)
Assistant manager	(Austria)
First-team coach	(Austria) Michael Madl
Goalkeeping coach	(Austria) Hubert Auer
Athletic coach	(Austria) Manuel Weber
Scout	(Germany)
Physiotherapist	(Germany) Björn Assmann
Team Manager	(Austria)

== Manager history ==
- (Austria) Klaus Roitinger (1 July 1988 – 31 May 1999)
- (Austria) Heinz Hochhauser (1 July 1999 – 31 May 2000)
- (Austria) Helmut Kronjäger (1 July 2000 – 20 April 2001)
- (Austria) Alfred Tatar (21 April 2001 – 21 March 2002)
- (Austria) Gerhard Schweitzer (26 March 2002 – 13 May 2003)
- (Austria) Klaus Roitinger (interim) (14 May 2003 – 31 May 2003)
- (Croatia) Petar Segrt (1 July 2003 – 31 December 2003)
- (Poland) Andrzej Lesiak (1 Jan 2004 – 30 June 2004)
- (Austria) Heinz Hochhauser (1 July 2004 – 31 May 2006)
- (Austria) Helmut Kraft (1 June 2006 – 22 October 2007)
- (Austria) Thomas Weissenböck (22 Oct 2007 – 6 April 2008)
- (Austria) Michael Angerschmid (interim) (9 April 2008 – 30 June 2008)
- (Austria) Georg Zellhofer (8 May 2008 – 2 July 2008)
- (Austria) Gerhard Schweitzer (interim) (2 July 2008 – 11 July 2008)
- (Austria) Paul Gludovatz (11 July 2008 – 19 March 2012)
- (Austria) Gerhard Schweitzer (interim) (20 March 2012 – 31 May 2012)
- (Austria) Heinz Fuchsbichler (1 June 2012 – 6 November 2012)
- (Austria) Gerhard Schweitzer (interim) (6 Nov 2012 – 9 December 2012)
- (Austria) Michael Angerschmid (9 Dec 2012 – 31 May 2014)
- (Austria) Oliver Glasner (1 June 2014 – 31 May 2015)
- (Iceland) Helgi Kolviðsson (1 June 2015 – 16 August 2015)
- (Austria) Paul Gludovatz (16 August 2015 – 30 June 2016)
- (Germany) Christian Benbennek (1 July 2016 –28 February 2017)
- (Austria) Lassaad Chabbi (1 March 2017 –2 April 2018)
- (Austria) Franz Schiemer (2 April 2018 –18 April 2018)
- (Austria) Thomas Weissenböck (18 April 2018 –12 November 2018)
- (Austria) (Bosnia and Herzegovina) Miron Muslić (12 November 2018 –25 November 2018)
- (Austria) Gerald Baumgartner (1 January 2019 –15 December 2020)
- (Austria) Gerhard Schweitzer (15 December 2020 –31 December 2020)
- (Austria) (Bosnia and Herzegovina) Miron Muslić (1 January 2021 –25 March 2021)
- (Austria) Christian Heinle (8 November 2021 –31 December 2021)
- (Austria) Robert Ibertsberger (1 January 2022 –18 April 2022)
- (Austria) Christian Heinle (19 April 2022 –March 2023)
- (Austria) Maximilian Senft (March 2023–)

== European Cup history ==
Q = Qualifying PO = Play-Off

Season	Competition	Round	Country	Club	Home	Away	Aggregate
1996	UEFA Intertoto Cup	Group 4	(Poland)	Zagłębie Lubin		1–2	
1996	UEFA Intertoto Cup	Group 4	(Denmark)	Silkeborg IF	0–3		
1996	UEFA Intertoto Cup	Group 4	(Wales)	Conwy United		2–1	
1996	UEFA Intertoto Cup	Group 4	(Belgium)	RSC Charleroi	1–3		
1997	UEFA Intertoto Cup	Group 12	(Greece)	Iraklis	3–1		
1997	UEFA Intertoto Cup	Group 12	(Malta)	Floriana		2–1	
1997	UEFA Intertoto Cup	Group 12	(Georgia (country))	Merani-91 Tbilisi	1–3		
1997	UEFA Intertoto Cup	Group 12	(Russia)	Torpedo Moskva		0–2	
1998–99	UEFA Cup Winners' Cup	1	(Hungary)	MTK Budapest	2–0	1–0	3–0
1998–99	UEFA Cup Winners' Cup	2	(Israel)	Maccabi Haifa	2–1	1–4	3–5
2001	UEFA Intertoto Cup	1	(Georgia (country))	WIT Georgia	2–1	0–1	2–2
2006	UEFA Intertoto Cup	2	(Georgia (country))	Dinamo Tbilisi	3–1	1–0	4–1
2006	UEFA Intertoto Cup	3R	(Moldova)	Tiraspol	3–1	1–1	4–2
2006–07	UEFA Cup	Q2	(Switzerland)	Sion	0–0	0–1	0–1
2007–08	UEFA Cup	Q1	(Azerbaijan)	Neftchi Baku	3–1	1–2	4–3
2007–08	UEFA Cup	Q2	(Switzerland)	Sion	1–1	0–3	1–4
2011–12	UEFA Europa League	Q3	(Denmark)	Brøndby IF	2–0	2–4	4–4
2011–12	UEFA Europa League	PO	(Netherlands)	PSV	0–0	0–5	0–5
