= 2021–22 Wolfsberger AC season =

Wolfsberger AC
2021–22 season
- Chairman: Dietmar Riegler
- Manager: Robin Dutt
- Stadium: Lavanttal-Arena
- Austrian Football Bundesliga: 3rd
- Austrian Cup: Semi-finals
Home colours	Away colours	Third colours

The 2021–22 season was the 91st season in the existence of Wolfsberger AC and the club's tenth consecutive season in the top flight of Austrian football. In addition to the domestic league, Wolfsberger AC participated in this season's edition of the Austrian Cup.

== Players ==
=== First-team squad ===
As of 8 January 2022

Note: Flags indicate national team as defined under FIFA eligibility rules; some limited exceptions apply. Players may hold more than one non-FIFA nationality.

No.	Pos.	Nation	Player
4	DF	AUT	David Gugganig
6	MF	AUT	Nikolas Veratschnig
7	MF	ISR	Eliel Peretz
8	FW	SEN	Cheikhou Dieng
9	FW	CRO	Dario Vizinger
10	MF	AUT	Michael Liendl
11	FW	ISR	Tai Baribo
16	MF	AUT	Mario Leitgeb
17	DF	AUT	Jonathan Scherzer
18	FW	AUT	Thorsten Röcher
19	MF	AUT	Sven Sprangler
20	MF	GHA	Augustine Boakye
21	GK	AUT	David Skubl

No.	Pos.	Nation	Player
22	DF	AUT	Dominik Baumgartner
23	MF	AUT	Lukas Schöfl
24	MF	AUT	Christopher Wernitznig
27	DF	AUT	Michael Novak
29	GK	AUT	Manuel Kuttin
30	MF	AUT	Matthäus Taferner
31	GK	AUT	Alexander Kofler
33	MF	AUT	Kai Stratznig
34	FW	AUT	Marcel Holzer
44	DF	GEO	Luka Lochoshvili
77	DF	BIH	Amar Dedić (on loan from Red Bull Salzburg)
97	MF	BIH	Adis Jašić

=== Out on loan ===
Note: Flags indicate national team as defined under FIFA eligibility rules; some limited exceptions apply. Players may hold more than one non-FIFA nationality.

No. / Pos. / Nation / Player; — / DF / GEO / Guram Giorbelidze (at Dynamo Dresden)	No. / Pos. / Nation / Player; — / MF / AUT / Joshua Steiger (at SV Lafnitz)

== Pre-season and friendlies ==
Win Draw Loss

26 June 2021 Friendly	Wolfsberger AC	1–0	Olympiacos	Wörgl, Austria
17:00 CEST (UTC+2)				Stadium: Sportstadion Wörgl

29 June 2021 Friendly	Wolfsberger AC	0–0	Ufa	St. Ulrich am Pillersee, Austria
15:00 CEST (UTC+2)				Stadium: Sportplatz St. Ulrich

3 July 2021 Friendly	Wolfsberger AC	1–3	Rijeka	Velden am Wörthersee, Austria
15:30 CEST (UTC+2)				Stadium: Sportplatz Velden

9 July 2021 Friendly	Wolfsberger AC	3–2	Sparta Prague	Wolfsberg, Austria
17:00 CEST (UTC+2)

21 January 2022 Friendly	Ludogorets Razgrad	3–3	Wolfsberger AC	Belek, Turkey
14:30 CET (UTC+1)				Stadium: Titanic Sports Center

24 January 2022 Friendly	Wolfsberger AC	1–4	Shakhtar Donetsk	Belek, Turkey
14:30 CET (UTC+1)				Stadium: Titanic Sports Center

27 January 2022 Friendly	Wolfsberger AC	1–1	Bohemians 1905	Belek, Turkey
13:30 CET (UTC+1)				Stadium: Titanic Sports Center

== Competitions ==
=== Overall record ===
Competition	First match	Last match	Starting round	Final position	Record							
Competition	First match	Last match	Starting round	Final position	Pld	W	D	L	GF	GA	GD	Win %
Austrian Football Bundesliga	25 July 2021	21 May 2022	Matchday 1	3rd	32	14	5	13	48	53	−5	43.75
Austrian Cup	16 July 2021	16 March 2022	First round	Semi-finals	5	4	1	0	19	7	+12	80.00
Total					37	18	6	13	67	60	+7	48.65

Source: Soccerway

=== Austrian Football Bundesliga ===
==== Regular stage ====
Austrian Bundesliga regular season table
Pos	Team	Pld	W	D	L	GF	GA	GD	Pts	Qualification
1	Red Bull Salzburg	22	17	4	1	50	13	+37	55	Qualification for the Championship round
2	Sturm Graz	22	10	7	5	46	32	+14	37	Qualification for the Championship round
3	Wolfsberger AC	22	11	4	7	34	32	+2	37	Qualification for the Championship round
4	Austria Wien	22	8	9	5	31	23	+8	33	Qualification for the Championship round
5	Rapid Wien	22	8	7	7	35	31	+4	31	Qualification for the Championship round

Source: Austrian Football Bundesliga
Rules for classification: 1) Points; 2) Head-to-head record; 3) Goal difference; 4) Goals scored; 5) Matches won; 6) Away matches won; 7) Away goals scored.

==== Results summary ====
Overall								Home						Away					
Pld	W	D	L	GF	GA	GD	Pts	W	D	L	GF	GA	GD	W	D	L	GF	GA	GD
20	10	4	6	33	31	+2	34	6	1	3	19	14	+5	4	3	3	14	17	−3

Source: Austrian Football Bundesliga

==== Results by round ====
Round	1	2	3	4	5	6	7	8	9	10	11	12	13	14	15	16	17	18	19	20	21	22
Ground	A	H	A	H	H	A	H	A	H	H	A	H	A	H	A	A	H	A	H	A	A	H
Result	D	L	L	D	W	W	L	D	L	W	W	W	W	W	L	W	W	D	W	L		
Position	7	11	12	12	9	5	8	7	9	7	3	3	3	3	3	3	2	2	2	2		

Source: Austrian Football Bundesliga
A = Away; H = Home; W = Win; D = Draw; L = Loss

==== Matches ====
The league fixtures were announced on 22 June 2021.

25 July 2021 1	Austria Klagenfurt	1–1	Wolfsberger AC	Klagenfurt
17:00 CEST (UTC+2)				Stadium: Wörthersee Stadion

1 August 2021 2	Wolfsberger AC	1–4	Sturm Graz	Wolfsberg
17:00 CEST (UTC+2)				Stadium: Lavanttal-Arena

7 August 2021 3	Rapid Wien	3–0	Wolfsberger AC	Vienna
17:00 CEST (UTC+2)				Stadium: Allianz Stadion

14 August 2021 4	Wolfsberger AC	2–2	WSG Tirol	Wolfsberg
17:00 CEST (UTC+2)				Stadium: Lavanttal-Arena

21 August 2021 5	Wolfsberger AC	3–0	Admira Wacker Mödling	Wolfsberg
17:00 CEST (UTC+2)				Stadium: Lavanttal-Arena

28 August 2021 6	Rheindorf Altach	1–2	Wolfsberger AC	Altach
17:00 CEST (UTC+2)				Stadium: Stadion Schnabelholz

11 September 2021 7	Wolfsberger AC	1–3	Hartberg	Wolfsberg
17:00 CEST (UTC+2)				Stadium: Lavanttal-Arena

18 September 2021 8	Ried	3–3	Wolfsberger AC	Ried im Innkreis
17:00 CEST (UTC+2)	Wießmeier 62' (yellow card) 90+1' (goal) 90+4'; Leo Mikić 70'; Offenbacher (yellow card) 79'	Report	Peretz 19' (yellow card) 64'; Röcher 25'; Baribo 57'; Kofler (yellow card) 69'	Stadium: Josko Arena; Attendance: 4,030; Referee: (Austria) Sebastian Gishamer

25 September 2021 9	Wolfsberger AC	0–2	Red Bull Salzburg	Wolfsberg
17:00 CEST (UTC+2)	Gugganig (yellow card) 41' (yellow-red card) 44'	Report	Onguéné 15'; Okafor 51'; Bernardo (yellow card) 56'; Camara (yellow card) 90'	Stadium: Lavanttal-Arena; Attendance: 3,023; Referee: (Austria) Josef Spurny

2 October 2021 10	Wolfsberger AC	1–0	Austria Wien	Wolfsberg
17:00 CET	Liendl (yellow card) 27'; Baribo 43'; Peretz (yellow card) 71'; Taferner (yellow card) 90+3'	Report	Mühl (yellow card) 86'; Can Keles (yellow card) 90+1'	Stadium: Lavanttal-Arena; Attendance: 2,800; Referee: (Austria) Stefan Ebner

17 October 2021 11	LASK	0–1	Wolfsberger AC	Pasching
14:30 CET	Flecker (yellow card) 56'	Report	Leitgeb (yellow card) 51'; Baribo 55' (yellow card) 73'; Röcher (yellow card) 61'	Stadium: Raiffeisen Arena; Attendance: 4,000; Referee: (Austria) Sebastian Gishamer

23 October 2021 12	Wolfsberger AC	2–1	Austria Klagenfurt	Wolfsberg
17:00 CET	Röcher 16'; Peretz (yellow card) 30'; Liendl 51'; Lochoshvili (yellow card) 67'	Report	Timossi Andersson 46' (yellow card) 63'; Paul (yellow card) 71'	Stadium: Lavanttal-Arena; Attendance: 5,600; Referee: (Austria) Chiristian-Petru Ciochirca

31 October 2021 13	Sturm Graz	0–3	Wolfsberger AC	Graz
14:30 CET		Report	Lochoshvili (yellow card) 6'; Liendl 16'; Baumgartner (yellow card) 61'; Dante 64' (o.g.); Jasic (yellow card) 78'; Dieng 90+4'	Stadium: Merkur-Arena; Attendance: 10,007; Referee: (Austria) Markus Hameter

==== Championship round ====
Pos	Team	Pld	W	D	L	GF	GA	GD	Pts	Qualification	RBS	STU	AWI	WOL	RWI	KLA
2	Sturm Graz	32	16	8	8	62	46	+16	37	Qualification for the Champions League third qualifying round	2–1	—	1–0	1–4	2–1	3–1
3	Austria Wien	32	11	13	8	44	39	+5	29	Qualification for the Europa League play-off round	1–2	4–2	—	2–1	1–1	1–1
4	Wolfsberger AC	32	14	5	13	48	53	−5	28	Qualification for the Europa Conference League third qualifying round	1–4	0–2	1–1	—	2–1	1–2
5	Rapid Wien (O)	32	10	11	11	48	45	+3	25	Qualification for the Europa Conference League play-offs	0–1	1–1	1–1	2–1	—	2–2
6	Austria Klagenfurt	32	8	12	12	43	57	−14	21		0–6	1–2	1–2	2–3	1–3	—

Legend: Blue = home team win; Yellow = draw; Red = away team win.
Rules for classification: 1) Points; 2) Points with (possible) half points subtracted due to rounding; 3) Head-to-head points; 4) Head-to-head goal difference; 5) Head-to-head goals scored; 6) Head-to-head away goals scored; 7) Goal difference; 8) Goals scored; 9) Matches won; 10) Away matches won; 11) Away goals scored.
(O) Play-off winners

=== Austrian Cup ===
16 July 2021 First round	Wiener Sport-Club	0–3	Wolfsberger AC	Vienna
19:30 CEST (UTC+2)	Buzuk (yellow card) 30'; Josic (yellow card) 65'	Report	Dedić 18'; Scherzer 32'; Vizinger 60'; Liendl (yellow card) 63'	Stadium: Sportklub Stadium; Referee: Alan Kijas

21 September 2021 Second round	ASV Seigendorf	1–6	Wolfsberger AC	Siegendorf
19:00 CEST (UTC+2)	Secco 34'	Report	Baribo 7'; Taferner 14', 18'; Baumgartner 28'; Boakye (yellow card) 47', (goal) 82'; Dieng 87' (pen.)	Stadium: Sportplatz Siegendorf; Attendance: 910; Referee: Harald Lechner

26 October 2021 Third round	SV Lafnitz	3–5 (a.e.t.)	Wolfsberger AC	Lafnitz
11:30 CEST (UTC+2)	Wendler 23'; Baumgartner 26' (o.g.); Siegl (yellow card) 54'; Schriebl 68'; Sittsam (yellow card) 103'	Report	Leitgeb (yellow card) 11'; Taferner 19'; Vizinger 38'; Peretz (yellow card) 55'; Wernitznig 78', 120+3'; Baumgartner 112'	Stadium: Sportplatz Lafnitz; Attendance: 840; Referee: Arnes Talic

4 February 2022 Quarter-finals	Wolfsberger AC	4–2 (a.e.t.)	Floridsdorfer AC	Wolfsberg
18:00 CET (UTC+1)	Baribo 35'; Vizinger 46'; Dedić (yellow card) 111'; Kuttin (yellow card) 112'; Röcher (yellow card) 113', (goal) 117'; Jasic 120'	Report	Oliveira 20', (yellow card) 117'; Maier (yellow card) 64'; Bubalović (yellow card) 77' (yellow-red card) 110'; Krainz (yellow card) 90'; Rechberger 90+6', (yellow card) 111'; Flavio (yellow card) 111'; Felber (yellow card) 116'	Stadium: Lavanttal-Arena; Attendance: 300; Referee: Alexander Harkam

16 March 2022 Semi-finals	Wolfsberger AC	1–1 (a.e.t.) (4–5 p)	Red Bull Salzburg	Wolfsberg
18:00 CET (UTC+1)	Taferner 3', (yellow card) 120'; Peretz (yellow card) 63'; Veratschnig (yellow card) 90+4'	Report	Šeško 77', (red card) 117'; Kjærgaard (yellow card) 101'	Stadium: Lavanttal-Arena; Attendance: 4,380; Referee: Markus Hameter
	Penalties
	Leitgeb (penalty scored); Wernitznig (penalty missed); Peretz (penalty scored); Baumgartner (penalty scored); Liendl (penalty scored)		(penalty scored) Kristensen; (penalty scored) Okafor; (penalty scored) Kjærgaard; (penalty scored) Aaronson; (penalty scored) Solet
