= 2020–21 Wolfsberger AC season =

Wolfsberger AC
2020–21 season
- Chairman: Dietmar Riegler
- Manager: Ferdinand Feldhofer
- Stadium: Lavanttal-Arena
- Austrian Bundesliga: 5th
- Austrian Cup: Semi-finals
- UEFA Europa League: Round of 32
- Top goalscorer: League: Dejan Joveljić (18); All: Dejan Joveljić (20)
Home colours	Away colours	Third colours
- All statistics correct as of 30 May 2021.

The 2020–21 season was Wolfsberger AC's 90th season in existence and the club's ninth consecutive season in the top flight of Austrian football. In addition to the domestic league, Wolfsberger participated in this season's edition of the Austrian Cup and UEFA Europa League. The season covered the period from 5 July 2020 to 30 June 2021.

== Players ==
=== First-team squad ===
As of 26 August 2020

Note: Flags indicate national team as defined under FIFA eligibility rules; some limited exceptions apply. Players may hold more than one non-FIFA nationality.

No.	Pos.	Nation	Player
2	DF	GEO	Guram Giorbelidze
3	DF	SWE	Gustav Henriksson
4	DF	AUT	Jonathan Scherzer
5	DF	AUT	Stefan Perić
6	MF	AUT	Mario Pavelić
7	MF	ISR	Eliel Peretz
8	FW	SEN	Cheikhou Dieng
9	FW	SRB	Dejan Joveljić (on loan from Eintracht Frankfurt)
10	MF	AUT	Michael Liendl
11	FW	CRO	Dario Vizinger
15	DF	SRB	Nemanja Rnić
16	MF	AUT	Mario Leitgeb
17	MF	AUT	Kai Stratznig

No.	Pos.	Nation	Player
19	MF	AUT	Sven Sprangler
22	DF	AUT	Dominik Baumgartner
23	MF	AUT	Lukas Schöfl
24	MF	AUT	Christopher Wernitznig
25	DF	AUT	Fabian Tauchhammer
27	DF	AUT	Michael Novak
29	GK	AUT	Manuel Kuttin
30	MF	AUT	Matthäus Taferner
31	GK	AUT	Alexander Kofler
32	GK	AUT	Marko Soldo
37	FW	AUT	Amar Hodzić
44	DF	GEO	Luka Lochoshvili

=== Out on loan ===
Note: Flags indicate national team as defined under FIFA eligibility rules; some limited exceptions apply. Players may hold more than one non-FIFA nationality.

No.	Pos.	Nation	Player
—	MF	AUT	Joshua Steiger (at SV Lafnitz)

== Pre-season and friendlies ==
Win Draw Loss Fixtures

12 August 2020 Friendly	Sparta Prague	2–2	Wolfsberger AC	Bad Kleinkirchheim, Austria
18:00 CEST (UTC+2)				Stadium: Sportarena Bad Kleinkirchheim; Attendance: 0

18 August 2020 Friendly	Wolfsberger AC	0–2	Ajax	Saalfelden, Austria
18:00 CEST (UTC+2)	Peretz (yellow card) 54'		Promes 3'; Martínez (yellow card) 32'; Gravenberch 52'	Stadium: Saalfelden Arena; Attendance: 0 Referee: Christopher Jäger

21 August 2020 Friendly	Wolfsberger AC	2–1	SV Horn	Anif, Austria
15:00 CEST (UTC+2)	Dieng 72'; Taferner 79'		Lasheen 64'	Stadium: Sportzentrum Anif; Attendance: 0

6 September 2020 Friendly	Wolfsberger AC	2–0	Juniors OÖ	Wolfsberg, Austria
18:00 CEST (UTC+2)				Stadium: Lavanttal-Arena; Attendance: 0

26 March 2021 Friendly	Wolfsberger AC	Cancelled	Domžale	Wolfsberg, Austria
14:00 CET (UTC+1)				Stadium: Lavanttal-Arena

== Competitions ==
=== Overview ===
Competition	First match	Last match	Starting round	Final position	Record							
Competition	First match	Last match	Starting round	Final position	Pld	W	D	L	GF	GA	GD	Win %
Austrian Football Bundesliga	13 September 2020	22 May 2021	Matchday 1	5th	32	13	5	14	52	62	−10	40.63
Austrian Bundesliga play-offs	27 May 2021	30 May 2021	First leg	Runners-up	2	0	0	2	1	5	−4	0.00
Austrian Cup	28 August 2020	3 March 2021	First round	Semi-finals	5	3	1	1	11	6	+5	60.00
UEFA Europa League	22 October 2020	24 February 2021	Group stage	Round of 32	8	3	1	4	8	14	−6	37.50
Total					47	19	7	21	72	87	−15	40.43

Last updated: 30 May 2021
Source: Soccerway

=== Austrian Bundesliga ===
==== Regular stage ====
Pos	Team	Pld	W	D	L	GF	GA	GD	Pts	Qualification
3	LASK	22	13	3	6	42	21	+21	42	Qualification for the Championship round
4	Sturm Graz	22	11	6	5	34	20	+14	39	Qualification for the Championship round
5	Wolfsberger AC	22	10	3	9	40	39	+1	33	Qualification for the Championship round
6	WSG Tirol	22	8	6	8	37	34	+3	30	Qualification for the Championship round
7	Hartberg	22	7	8	7	25	38	−13	29	Qualification for the Relegation round

Source: Austrian Football Bundesliga
Rules for classification: 1) Points; 2) Goal difference; 3) Goals scored; 4) Matches won; 5) Away matches won; 6) Head-to-head points; 7) Head-to-head goal difference; 8) Head-to-head goals scored.

==== Results summary ====
Overall								Home						Away					
Pld	W	D	L	GF	GA	GD	Pts	W	D	L	GF	GA	GD	W	D	L	GF	GA	GD
22	10	3	9	40	39	+1	33	2	3	6	15	24	−9	8	0	3	25	15	+10

Last updated: 21 March 2021.
Source: Austrian Football Bundesliga

==== Results by round ====
Round	1	2	3	4	5	6	7	8	9	10	11	12	13	14	15	16	17	18	19	20	21	22
Ground	H	A	A	H	H	A	H	A	H	A	H	A	H	H	A	A	H	A	H	A	H	A
Result	L	W	L	L	L	W	D	W	D	L	W	W	D	L	W	L	W	W	L	W	L	W
Position	11	6	9	9	10	7	8	7	6	7	7	6	6	6	6	6	6	5	5	5	5	5

Updated to match(es) played on 21 March 2021. Source: Austrian Football Bundesliga
A = Away; H = Home; W = Win; D = Draw; L = Loss

==== Matches ====
The league fixtures were announced on 9 July 2020.

13 September 2020 1	Wolfsberger AC	1–3	Red Bull Salzburg	Wolfsberg
17:00 CEST (UTC+2)	Lochoshvili (red card) 16'; Scherzer (yellow card) 33'; Rnić (yellow card) 88'; Vizinger 90+3'	Report	Peretz 21' (o.g.); Daka 27'; Ashimeru (yellow card) 75'; Koïta 82'	Stadium: Lavanttal-Arena; Attendance: 2,592; Referee: Markus Hameter

20 September 2020 2	Hartberg	0–2	Wolfsberger AC	Hartberg
14:30 CEST (UTC+2)	Tijani (yellow card) 31' (yellow-red card) 72'	Report	Novak (yellow card) 19'; Taferner 55'; Vizinger 60'	Stadium: Profertil Arena Hartberg; Attendance: 1,500; Referee: Josef Spurny

27 September 2020 3	LASK	3–1	Wolfsberger AC	Pasching
17:00 CEST (UTC+2)	Balić 26'; Raguž 55' (pen.); Trauner 78'	Report	Baumgartner 73'	Stadium: Raiffeisen Arena; Attendance: 3,228; Referee: Harald Lechner

3 October 2020 4	Wolfsberger AC	2–4	St. Pölten	Wolfsberg
17:00 CEST (UTC+2)	Joveljić 15', 48'	Report	Hugi 11' (pen.), 22'; Grozurek 37'; Halper 90+3'	Stadium: Lavanttal-Arena; Attendance: 1,559; Referee: Sebastian Gishamer

25 October 2020 5	Wolfsberger AC	3–4	Rapid Wien	Wolfsberg
17:00 CET (UTC+1)	Baumgartner 47', 52'; Dieng 67'	Report	Schick 25'; Kitagawa 35'; Kara 76', 90+3'	Stadium: Lavanttal-Arena; Attendance: 1,534; Referee: Stefan Ebner

1 November 2020 6	Admira Wacker Mödling	1–3	Wolfsberger AC	Maria Enzersdorf
14:30 CET (UTC+1)	Rnić 88' (o.g.)	Report	Liendl 12' (pen.), 22' (pen.); Peretz 37'	Stadium: BSFZ-Arena; Attendance: 750; Referee: Manuel Schüttengruber

21 November 2020 8	Rheindorf Altach	0–2	Wolfsberger AC	Altach
17:00 CET (UTC+1)		Report	Peretz 73'; Vizinger 79'	Stadium: Stadion Schnabelholz; Attendance: 0 Referee: Walter Altmann

29 November 2020 9	Wolfsberger AC	1–1	Ried	Wolfsberg
14:30 CET (UTC+1)	Joveljić 54'	Report	Grüll 85' (pen.)	Stadium: Lavanttal-Arena; Attendance: 0 Referee: Harald Lechner

6 December 2020 10	WSG Tirol	4–1	Wolfsberger AC	Innsbruck
14:30 CET (UTC+1)	Gugganig 26'; Yeboah 30'; Anselm 77'; Smith 90+4'	Report	Joveljić 66'	Stadium: Tivoli Stadion Tirol; Attendance: 0 Referee: Oliver Drachta

13 December 2020 11	Wolfsberger AC	3–2	Austria Wien	Wolfsberg
14:30 CET (UTC+1)	Joveljić 17'; Peretz 69'; Liendl 90+3' (pen.)	Report	Turgeman 1'; Monschein 71' (pen.)	Stadium: Lavanttal-Arena; Attendance: 0 Referee: Rene Eisner

20 December 2020 12	Red Bull Salzburg	2–3	Wolfsberger AC	Wals-Siezenheim
14:30 CET (UTC+1)	Berisha 64'; Mwepu (yellow card) 68'; Daka 69'	Report	Scherzer 50', (yellow card) 61'; Joveljić 52'; Peretz (yellow card) 75', (goal) 79'	Stadium: Stadion Wals-Siezenheim; Attendance: 0 Referee: Julian Weinberger

17 January 2021 7	Wolfsberger AC	0–0	Sturm Graz	Wolfsberg
17:00 CET (UTC+1)		Report		Stadium: Lavanttal-Arena; Attendance: 0 Referee: Markus Hameter

23 January 2021 13	Wolfsberger AC	0–0	Hartberg	Wolfsberg
17:00 CET (UTC+1)		Report		Stadium: Lavanttal-Arena; Attendance: 0 Referee: Manuel Schüttengruber

27 January 2021 14	Wolfsberger AC	0–3	LASK	Wolfsberg
20:30 CET (UTC+1)		Report	Gruber 50', 60'; Holland 79'	Stadium: Lavanttal-Arena; Attendance: 0 Referee: Alexander Harkam

31 January 2021 15	St. Pölten	0–2	Wolfsberger AC	Sankt Pölten
14:30 CET (UTC+1)		Report	Joveljić 27'; Liendl 74'	Stadium: NV Arena; Attendance: 0 Referee: Felix Ouschan

9 February 2021 16	Rapid Wien	1–0	Wolfsberger AC	Vienna
20:30 CET (UTC+1)	Kara 32'	Report		Stadium: Allianz Stadion; Attendance: 0 Referee: Alan Kijas

13 February 2021 17	Wolfsberger AC	2–1	Admira Wacker Mödling	Wolfsberg
17:00 CET (UTC+1)	Henriksson 17'; Joveljić 76'	Report	Wooten 3'	Stadium: Lavanttal-Arena; Attendance: 0 Referee: Rene Eisner

21 February 2021 18	Sturm Graz	1–2	Wolfsberger AC	Graz
14:30 CET (UTC+1)	Siebenhandl (red card) 35'; Ljubic 43'	Report	Baumgartner 28'; Vizinger 90'	Stadium: Merkur-Arena; Attendance: 0 Referee: Markus Hameter

28 February 2021 19	Wolfsberger AC	0–1	Rheindorf Altach	Wolfsberg
14:30 CET (UTC+1)	Röcher (yellow card) 10'; Taferner (yellow card) 57'	Report	Thurnwald (yellow card) 56'; Meilinger 56'; Haudum (yellow card) 90+2'	Stadium: Lavanttal-Arena; Attendance: 0 Referee: Christopher Jäger

7 March 2021 20	Ried	0–4	Wolfsberger AC	Ried im Innkreis
14:30 CET (UTC+1)	Nutz (yellow card) 18'	Report	Vizinger 9', (yellow card) 61'; Liendl 13' (pen.); Stratznig (yellow card) 43'; Joveljić 56'; Röcher 90+4'	Stadium: Keine Sorgen Arena; Attendance: 0 Referee: Gerhard Grobelnik

14 March 2021 21	Wolfsberger AC	3–5	WSG Tirol	Wolfsberg
17:00 CET (UTC+1)	Joveljić 2'; Stratznig (yellow card) 38'; Wernitznig 68'; Peretz (yellow card) 72'; Dieng 86'	Report	Celic 7'; Frederiksen 14'; Anselm 39'; Rogelj 55', (yellow card) 77'; Rieder 59'	Stadium: Lavanttal-Arena; Attendance: 0 Referee: Harald Lechner

21 March 2021 22	Austria Wien	3–5	Wolfsberger AC	Vienna
17:00 CET (UTC+1)	Djuricin 7'; Fitz (yellow card) 31'; Monschein (yellow card) 50'; Grünwald 66'; Zeka 78'	Report	Lochoshvili 14'; Stratznig (yellow card) 20'; Röcher 33'; Joveljić 44'; Baumgartner (yellow card) 45+1'; Liendl 53'; Vizinger 86'	Stadium: Generali Arena; Attendance: 0 Referee: Manuel Schüttengruber

==== Championship round ====
Pos	Team	Pld	W	D	L	GF	GA	GD	Pts	Qualification	RBS	RWI	STU	LIN	WOL	WAT
2	Rapid Wien	32	17	8	7	64	40	+24	36	Qualification for the Champions League second qualifying round	0–3	—	0–0	3–0	1–2	4–0
3	Sturm Graz	32	16	8	8	52	34	+18	36	Qualification for the Europa League play-off round	1–3	4–1	—	3–1	0–1	3–2
4	LASK	32	15	6	11	55	41	+14	30	Qualification for the Europa Conference League third qualifying round	2–5	1–1	0–0	—	2–1	3–3
5	Wolfsberger AC	32	13	5	14	52	62	−10	27	Qualification for the Europa Conference League play-off final	1–2	1–8	1–3	0–4	—	2–0
6	WSG Tirol	32	10	8	14	53	60	−7	23		3–2	2–3	2–3	2–0	2–2	—

Legend: Blue = home team win; Yellow = draw; Red = away team win.
Rules for classification: 1) Points; 2) Points with (possible) half points subtracted due to rounding; 3) Goal difference; 4) Goals scored; 5) Matches won; 6) Away matches won; 7) Head-to-head points; 8) Head-to-head goal difference; 9) Head-to-head goals scored.

==== Results summary ====
Overall								Home						Away					
Pld	W	D	L	GF	GA	GD	Pts	W	D	L	GF	GA	GD	W	D	L	GF	GA	GD
32	13	5	14	52	62	−10	44	3	3	10	20	41	−21	10	2	4	32	21	+11

Last updated: 22 May 2021.
Source: Austrian Football Bundesliga

==== Results by round ====
Round	1	2	3	4	5	6	7	8	9	10
Ground	H	A	H	A	H	A	A	H	A	H
Result	L	L	W	W	L	D	W	L	D	L
Position	6	6	5	5	5	5	5	5	5	5

Updated to match(es) played on 22 May 2021. Source: Austrian Football Bundesliga
A = Away; H = Home; W = Win; D = Draw; L = Loss

==== Matches ====
4 April 2021 23	Wolfsberger AC	1–8	Rapid Wien	Wolfsberg
14:30 CEST (UTC+2)	Peretz (yellow card) 20'; Lochoshvili (red card) 29'; Röcher 39'; Pavelić (yellow card) 43'; Baumgartner (yellow card) 43'	Report	Fountas 22', 58', 61'; Barać (yellow card) 27'; Kara 32'; Ullmann 57'; Scherzer 70', 84' (o.g.); Demir 78'	Stadium: Lavanttal-Arena; Attendance: 0 Referee: Walter Altmann

11 April 2021 24	LASK	2–1	Wolfsberger AC	Pasching
14:30 CEST (UTC+2)	Filipović (yellow card) 11'; Ranftl 28'; Schlager (yellow card) 60'; Wiesinger 78' (pen.)	Report	Henriksson (yellow card) 27'; Röcher 70'	Stadium: Raiffeisen Arena; Attendance: 0 Referee: Christian-Petru Ciochirca

18 April 2021 25	Wolfsberger AC	2–0	WSG Tirol	Wolfsberg
14:30 CEST (UTC+2)	Joveljić 6', 62'	Report	Behounek (yellow card) 30'; Schnegg (yellow card) 45'; Koch (yellow card) 90+1'	Stadium: Lavanttal-Arena; Attendance: 0 Referee: Julian Weinberger

21 April 2021 26	Sturm Graz	0–1	Wolfsberger AC	Graz
18:30 CEST (UTC+2)	Geyrhofer (red card) 89'	Report	Giorbelidze (yellow card) 42'; Leitgeb (yellow card) 51'; Liendl 90' (pen.)	Stadium: Merkur-Arena; Attendance: 0 Referee: Gerhard Grobelnik

25 April 2021 27	Wolfsberger AC	1–2	Red Bull Salzburg	Wolfsberg
14:30 CEST (UTC+2)	Joveljić 29'	Report	Daka 13', (yellow card) 41'; Berisha 48'; Bernède (red card) 72'; Junuzović (yellow card) 78'	Stadium: Lavanttal-Arena; Attendance: 0 Referee: Harald Lechner

28 April 2021 28	Red Bull Salzburg	1–1	Wolfsberger AC	Wals-Siezenheim
18:30 CEST (UTC+2)	Mwepu (yellow card) 64'; Adeyemi 86'	Report	Leitgeb (yellow card) 23'; Affengruber 68' (o.g.)	Stadium: Stadion Wals-Siezenheim; Attendance: 0 Referee: Dieter Muckenhammer

9 May 2021 29	Rapid Wien	1–2	Wolfsberger AC	Vienna
17:00 CEST (UTC+2)	Ritzmaier 57'; Stojković (yellow card) 67'; Petrovič (yellow card) 76'; Barać (red card) 77'	Report	Baumgartner (yellow card) 24'; Muharemovic (yellow card) 26'; Liendl 68' (pen.); Dieng 90+1'; Vizinger (yellow card) 90+3'	Stadium: Allianz Stadion; Attendance: 0 Referee: Christopher Jäger

12 May 2021 30	Wolfsberger AC	0–4	LASK	Wolfsberg
18:30 CEST (UTC+2)		Report	Eggestein 18', 61' (pen.); Ranftl 26'; Reiter 90+2'	Stadium: Lavanttal-Arena; Attendance: 0 Referee: Josef Spurny

16 May 2021 31	WSG Tirol	2–2	Wolfsberger AC	Innsbruck
17:00 CEST (UTC+2)	Rogelj 13'; Pranter 73', (penalty missed) 90+2'; Naschberger (yellow card) 86'; Celic (yellow card) 90'	Report	Joveljić 62', 69'; Baumgartner (yellow card) 90+1' (yellow-red card) 90+2'	Stadium: Tivoli Stadion Tirol; Attendance: 0 Referee: Julian Weinberger

22 May 2021 32	Wolfsberger AC	1–3	Sturm Graz	Wolfsberg
17:00 CEST (UTC+2)	Röcher (red card) 28'; Joveljić 36'; Leitgeb (yellow card) 70'; Vizinger (yellow card) 90+1'	Report	Yeboah (yellow card) 11', (goal) 59', 67'; Jantscher (yellow card) 25'; Scherzer 54' (o.g.); Balaj (penalty missed) 80'	Stadium: Lavanttal-Arena; Attendance: 0 Referee: Markus Hameter

==== European competition play-offs ====
27 May 2021 First leg	Austria Wien	3–0	Wolfsberger AC	Vienna
19:00 CEST (UTC+2)	Sarkaria 2'; Wimmer (yellow card) 37'; Djuricin 46', 72', (yellow card) 58'; Fitz (yellow card) 79'	Report	Taferner (yellow card) 32'; Wernitznig (yellow card) 59'	Stadium: Generali Arena; Attendance: 0 Referee: Manuel Schüttengruber

30 May 2021 Second leg	Wolfsberger AC	1–2 (1–5 agg.)	Austria Wien	Wolfsberg
17:00 CEST (UTC+2)	Joveljić 25'; Leitgeb (red card) 35'	Report	Djuricin 24' (pen.); Demaku (yellow card) 57'; Monschein 68'	Stadium: Lavanttal-Arena; Attendance: 0 Referee: Alexander Harkam

=== Austrian Cup ===
28 August 2020 First round	Wolfsberger AC	5–2 (a.e.t.)	Neusiedl	Wolfsberg
18:00 CEST (UTC+2)	Peretz (yellow card) 4'; Schmerböck 22'; Dieng 57', 96'; Novak (yellow card) 91'; Liendl 100'; Schöfl 102'	Report	Ulbing (yellow card) 42'; Szegner (yellow card) 52'; Kienzl 64' (pen.); Steinacher (yellow card) 86'; Sommerer 90'	Stadium: Lavanttal-Arena; Attendance: 0 Referee: Thomas Fröhlacher

18 October 2020 Second round	Wolfsberger AC	2–2 (a.e.t.) (4–3 p)	Ried	Wolfsberg
17:15 CEST (UTC+2)	Baumgartner 29'; Liendl 81' (pen.)	Report	Nutz 20'; Ziegl 44'	Stadium: Lavanttal-Arena; Attendance: 0 Referee: Alexander Harkam
	Penalties
	Schmerböck (penalty scored); Dieng (penalty scored); Wotolen (penalty scored); Liendl (penalty scored)		(penalty scored) Grüll; (penalty scored) Grubeck; (penalty scored) Ziegl

16 December 2020 Third round	Wolfsberger AC	2–0	Amstetten	Wolfsberg
16:00 CET (UTC+1)	Baumgartner 9'; Liendl 90+3'	Report		Stadium: Lavanttal-Arena; Attendance: 0 Referee: Sebastian Gishamer

5 February 2021 Quarter-finals	Kapfenberger SV	1–2 (a.e.t.)	Wolfsberger AC	Kapfenberg
18:00 CET (UTC+1)	Hernaus 45+2'	Report	Liendl 15' (pen.); Novak 118'	Stadium: Franz Fekete Stadion; Attendance: 0 Referee: Julian Weinberger

3 March 2021 Semi-finals	Wolfsberger AC	0–1 (a.e.t.)	LASK	Wolfsberg
17:00 CET (UTC+1)		Report	Wiesinger 97' (pen.)	Stadium: Lavanttal-Arena; Attendance: 0 Referee: Sebastian Gishamer

=== UEFA Europa League ===
==== Group stage ====
The group stage draw was held on 2 October 2020.

Pos	Team	Pld	W	D	L	GF	GA	GD	Pts	Qualification	DZG	WAC	FEY	CSM
1	(Croatia) Dinamo Zagreb	6	4	2	0	9	1	+8	14	Advance to knockout phase	—	1–0	0–0	3–1
2	(Austria) Wolfsberger AC	6	3	1	2	7	6	+1	10	Advance to knockout phase	0–3	—	1–0	1–1
3	(Netherlands) Feyenoord	6	1	2	3	4	8	−4	5		0–2	1–4	—	3–1
4	(Russia) CSKA Moscow	6	0	3	3	3	8	−5	3		0–0	0–1	0–0	—

Source: UEFA
Rules for classification: Group stage tiebreakers

22 October 2020 1	Wolfsberger AC (Austria)	1–1	(Russia) CSKA Moscow	Klagenfurt, Austria
21:00 CEST (UTC+2)	Wernitznig (yellow card) 10'; Liendl 42' (pen.)	Report	Gaich 5'; Vlašić (yellow card) 18'; Tiknizyan (yellow card) 28'; Vasin (yellow card) 41'; Zaynutdinov (yellow card) 50'; Magnússon (yellow card) 50'; Ejuke (yellow card) 53'	Stadium: Wörthersee Stadion; Attendance: 3,000; Referee: Sascha Stegemann (Germany)

29 October 2020 2	Feyenoord (Netherlands)	1–4	(Austria) Wolfsberger AC	Rotterdam, Netherlands
18:55 CET (UTC+1)	Berghuis 54'	Report	Liendl 4' (pen.), 13' (pen.), 60'; Joveljić 66' (pen.)	Stadium: De Kuip; Attendance: 0 Referee: Mykola Balakin (Ukraine)

5 November 2020 3	Dinamo Zagreb (Croatia)	1–0	(Austria) Wolfsberger AC	Zagreb, Croatia
21:00 CET (UTC+1)	Leovac (yellow card) 55'; Franjić (yellow card) 66'; Majer (yellow card) 71'; Atiemwen 76'	Report	Taferner (yellow card) 14' (yellow-red card) 45'; Baumgartner (yellow card) 25'; Wernitznig (yellow card) 36'; Dieng (yellow card) 47'; Pavelić (yellow card) 68'; Hodzić (yellow card) 89'	Stadium: Stadion Maksimir; Attendance: 0 Referee: Jérôme Brisard (France)

26 November 2020 4	Wolfsberger AC (Austria)	0–3	(Croatia) Dinamo Zagreb	Klagenfurt, Austria
18:55 CET (UTC+1)	Leitgeb (yellow card) 44'; Scherzer (yellow card) 59'; Novak (yellow card) 83'	Report	Majer 60'; Petković 75'; Ivanušec 90+1'	Stadium: Wörthersee Stadion; Attendance: 0 Referee: Serhiy Boyko (Ukraine)

3 December 2020 5	CSKA Moscow (Russia)	0–1	(Austria) Wolfsberger AC	Moscow, Russia
18:55 CET (UTC+1)		Report	Vizinger 22'; Baumgartner (yellow card) 67'; Peretz (yellow card) 86'; Kofler (yellow card) 90+1'	Stadium: VEB Arena; Attendance: 4,321; Referee: Nikola Dabanović (Montenegro)

10 December 2020 6	Wolfsberger AC (Austria)	1–0	(Netherlands) Feyenoord	Klagenfurt, Austria
21:00 CET (UTC+1)	Joveljić 31', (yellow card) 37'; Sprangler (yellow card) 54'	Report	Spajić (yellow card) 34'; Berghuis (yellow card) 90+4'	Stadium: Wörthersee Stadion; Attendance: 0 Referee: Paweł Raczkowski (Poland)

==== Knockout phase ====
===== Round of 32 =====
The round of 32 draw was held on 14 December 2020.

18 February 2021 First leg	Wolfsberger AC (Austria)	1–4	(England) Tottenham Hotspur	Budapest, Hungary
18:55 CET (UTC+1)	Liendl 55' (pen.); Sprangler (yellow card) 62'	Report	Son 13'; Bale 28'; Lucas 34'; Alli (yellow card) 42'; Sissoko (yellow card) 54'; Højbjerg (yellow card) 82'; Carlos Vinícius 88'	Stadium: Puskás Aréna; Attendance: 0 Referee: Ali Palabıyık (Turkey)
Note: The match, originally to be played at Wörthersee Stadion in Klagenfurt, was moved to Puskás Aréna in Budapest, due to restrictions related to the COVID-19 pandemic imposed by Austria on travelers from the United Kingdom out of concern of the variant B.1.1.7.

24 February 2021 Second leg	Tottenham Hotspur (England)	4–0 (8–1 agg.)	(Austria) Wolfsberger AC	Tottenham, England
17:00 CET (UTC+1)	Alli 11'; Doherty (yellow card) 36'; Carlos Vinícius 50', 83'; Davies (yellow card) 65'; Bale 73'; Alderweireld (yellow card) 77'	Report	Baumgartner (yellow card) 61'; Wernitznig (yellow card) 63'	Stadium: Tottenham Hotspur Stadium; Attendance: 0 Referee: Matej Jug (Slovenia)
