= 2021–22 Austrian Cup =

Tournament details
- Country: Austria
- Teams: 64

Final positions
- Champions: Red Bull Salzburg
- Runners-up: SV Ried

Tournament statistics
- Matches played: 63
- Goals scored: 251 (3.98 per match)
- Top goal scorer(s): Benjamin Šeško (5 goals)

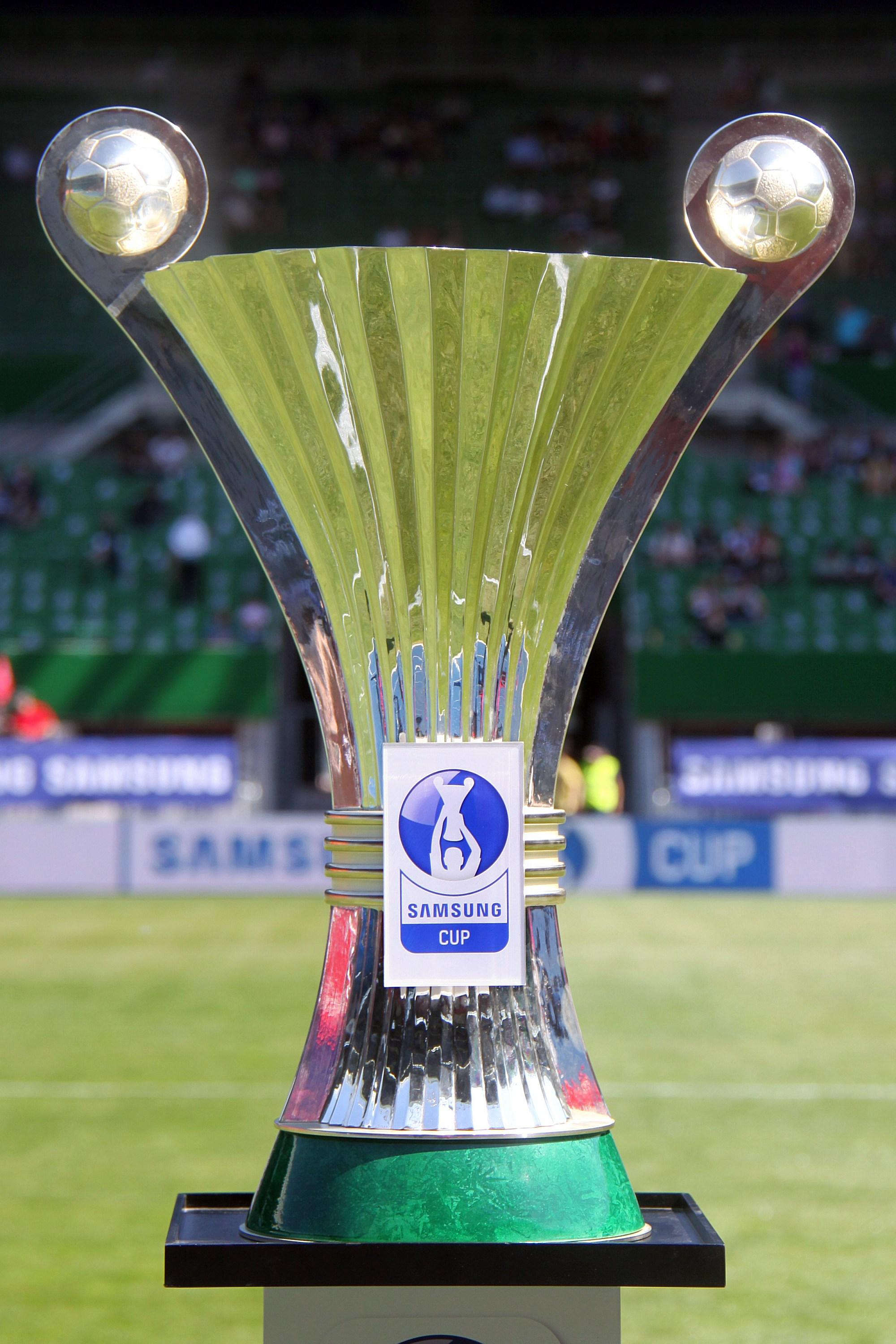
Final of the 2011–12 Austrian Cup FC Red Bull Salzburg vs. SV Ried at 2012-05-20 in the Ernst-Happel-Stadion, Vienna 3:0 (2:0)

The 2021–22 Austrian Cup was the 91st edition of the national cup in Austrian football. The champions of the cup earn a place in the 2022–23 Europa League play-off round.

Red Bull Salzburg were the defending champions after winning the competition in the previous season by defeating LASK in the final. Times up to 30 October 2021 and from 27 March 2022 were CEST (UTC+2), and times from 31 October 2021 to 26 March 2022 were CET (UTC+1).

== Round dates ==
The schedule of the competition was as follows.

Round	Match date
Round 1	16–18 July 2021
Round 2	21–23 September 2021
Round 3	26–28 October 2021
Quarter-finals	4–6 February 2022
Semi-finals	2–16 March 2022
Final	1 May 2022

== First round ==
Thirty-two first round matches were played between 16 July and 18 July 2021.

16 July 2021	WSC Hertha	1–4	Red Bull Salzburg	Mauth Stadion
16:00	Maier 33'	Report	Bernardo 14'; Šeško 52', 56'; Sučić 90'	Attendance: 2,200; Referee: Rene Eisner

16 July 2021	Intemann FC Lauterach	0–5	St. Pölten	Sportanlage Ried
17:00		Report	Ramsebner 9'; Alar 38'; Lang 67'; Vucenovic 76'; Halper 78'	Attendance: 500; Referee: Daniel Pfister

16 July 2021	SVG Reichenau	0–8	Wacker Innsbruck	Kunstrasen Reichenau
17:00		Report	Ronivaldo 26'; Holz 27', 65'; Glanzer 58' (o.g.); Aydin 61'; Fridrikas 63'; Luiz 67', 86'	Attendance: 600; Referee: Arnes Talic

16 July 2021	SV Lafnitz	3–0	FCM Traiskirchen	Fußballarena
18:00	Prohart 3'; Gremsl 61'; Grosse 83'	Report		Attendance: 250; Referee: Emil Rostoskov

16 July 2021	SC Neusiedl	0–4	Admira Wacker	Sportzentrum
18:00		Report	Kerschbaum 28' (pen.); Zwierschitz 36'; Kronberger 40'; Starkl 60'	Attendance: 579; Referee: Gerhard Grobelnik

16 July 2021	FC Eurotours Kitzbühel	0–2	SK Vorwärts Steyr	Sportstadion Kitzbühel
18:00		Report	Martinovic 62'; Ablinger 84'	Attendance: 500; Referee: Samuel Sampl

16 July 2021	Seekirchen	0–1	Floridsdorfer AC	Seekirchen
18:00		Report	Schmid 84'	Attendance: 300; Referee: Dieter Muckenhammer

16 July 2021	ASK-BSC Bruck/Leitha	0–1	SV Stripfing	Parkstadion
18:00		Report	Sahinturk 51'	Attendance: 350; Referee: Marcus Pottendorfer

16 July 2021	SC Schwaz	1–0	SV Horn	Silberstadt Arena
18:00	Pranter 29'	Report		Attendance: 200; Referee: Felix Ouschan

16 July 2021	World of Jobs VFB Hohenems	7–0	SV Fügen	Herrenriedstadion
18:00	Herbaly 9', 88'; Ganahl 22'; Wunderli 45', 55', 62'; Lampert 75'	Report		Attendance: 400; Referee: Christian Schadl

16 July 2021	TuS Bad Gleichenberg	0–3	TSV Hartberg	Sparkassen Stadion
18:00		Report	Sonnleitner 6'; Tadic 13'; Horvath 79'	Attendance: 850; Referee: Christian-Petru Ciochirca

16 July 2021	Wiener Sport-Club	0–3	Wolfsberger AC	Sportklub Stadium
18:30		Report	Dedic 18'; Scherzer 32'; Vizinger 60'	Attendance: 1,604; Referee: Alan Kijas

16 July 2021	SV Grödig	0–7	SV Ried	Untersberg-Arena
18:30		Report	Nutz 8', 21', 23', 82' (pen.); Reiner 17'; Offenbacher 71'; Weiddmeier 73'	Attendance: 425; Referee: Oliver Fluch

16 July 2021	SV Dellach/Gail	1–3	SC Weiz	Sportplatz SV Dellach/Gail
18:30	Wastian 47'	Report	Weiss 57'; Hasenhutl 61'; Prskalo 89'	Attendance: 500; Referee: Markus Greinecker

16 July 2021	SK Treibach	1–0	ASV Draßburg	Turnerwald-Stadion
18:30	Vaschauner 77'	Report		Attendance: 250; Referee: Alexander Lappi

16 July 2021	Rapid Wien	6–0	SC Wiener Viktoria	Allianz Stadion
19:30	Kara 29'; Hofmann 41'; Grahovac 58'; Arnberger 61' (o.g.); Knasmullner 65'; Grull 89'	Report		Attendance: 8,100; Referee: Harald Lechner

17 July 2021	SV Spittal	0–4	FK Austria Wien	Goldeck-Stadion
10:00		Report	Djuricin 16'; Martel 43'; Jukic 88'; Fischer 90+1'	Attendance: 1,123; Referee: Christopher Jäger

17 July 2021	ATSV Stadl-Paura	0–9	Sturm Graz	Maximilian-Pagl-Stadion
15:00		Report	Kiteishvili 18'; Kuen 34', 45'; Sarkaria 37', 44', 50'; Yeboah 39'; Jantscher 42'; Lang 87'	Attendance: 850; Referee: Thomas Fröhlacher

17 July 2021	FC Wels	1–3	SC Austria Lustenau	ASKÖ Stadion
16:00	Gamsjager 72'	Report	Stefanon 65', 77'; Tabakovic 66'	Attendance: 250; Referee: Gabriel Gmeiner

17 July 2021	FC Deutschkreutz	0–3	SKU Amstetten	Deutschkreutz
16:00		Report	Frederiksen 41', 70'; Peham 76'	Attendance: 400; Referee: Safak Barmaksiz

17 July 2021	SC Bregenz	5–1	Union Vöcklamarkt	Casino Stadium
16:00	Dervisevic 26'; Gomes 29', 73'; Blaser 60', 78'	Report	Vojvoda 21'	Attendance: 500; Referee: Andreas Heiss

17 July 2021	SV Leobendorf	0–3	WSG Tirol	Sportplatz Leobendorf SV
16:30		Report	Wallner 6', 90+3'; Vrioni 79'	Attendance: 600; Referee: Julian Weinberger

17 July 2021	TWL Elektra	3–1	FC Gleisdorf 09	Rax-Platz
17:00	Sallam 6'; Delic 45'; Endlicher 87'	Report	Schloffer 30'	Attendance: 100; Referee: Florian Jandl

17 July 2021	Union Raiffeisen Gurten	4–0	FC Lustenau 07	Park21-Arena
17:30	Kienberger 7'; Kreuzer 23'; Wimmleitner 54'; Przybylko 87'	Report		Attendance: 500; Referee: Markus Kouba

17 July 2021	SC Kalsdorf	2–1	SC Rheindorf Altach	Sportzentrum
17:30	Mihelic 8'; Appiah 58'	Report	Nuhiu 77'	Attendance: 347; Referee: Alain Sadikovski

17 July 2021	USV St. Anna am Aigen	1–2	Grazer AK	Stahlbau Müller Arena
18:00	Schleich 31'	Report	Gantschnig 14'; Rusek 30'	Attendance: 1,200; Referee: Alexander Harkam

17 July 2021	Wiener Neustädt	1–5	Austria Klagenfurt	Stadion Wiener Neustadt
18:00	Dominkus 3'	Report	Greil 13', 27'; Pink 67'; Cvetko 80'; Pecirep 90+1'	Attendance: 755; Referee: Markus Hameter

17 July 2021	LASK	6–0	SC Mannsdorf	Waldstadion
19:30	Renner 6', 44'; Michorl 15'; Goiginger 49'; Balic 54'; Flecker 85'	Report		Attendance: 3,000; Referee: Sebastian Gishamer

18 July 2021	First Vienna FC	3–5	Kapfenberger SV	Hohe Warte Stadium
10:00	Konrad 46', 56'; Luxbacher 62'	Report	Puschl 17', 37'; Eloshvili 64'; Hassler 85'; Kordic 88'	Attendance: 943; Referee: Stefan Ebner

27 July 2021	TSV St. Johann	1–0	FC Dornbirn 1913	Sportplatz St. Johann
18:00	Djuric 65'	Report		Attendance: 300; Referee: Achim Untergasser

27 July 2021	ASV Seigendorf	5–0	SV St. Jakob/Rosental	Sveta-Group Sportpark
19:00	Drga 30'; Stanic 43', 45'; Ivanovic 59'; Secco 88'	Report		Attendance: 450; Referee: Dominic Schilcher

28 July 2021	SV Kuchl	0–3	FC Blau-Weiß Linz	Kuchl
18:00		Report	Strauss 53'; Seidl 68', 90+4'	Attendance: 500; Referee: Jakob Semler

== Second round ==
Sixteen second round matches were played between 21 September and 23 September 2021.

21 September 2021	Kapfenberger SV	1–1 (a.e.t.) (5–4 p)	Austria Wien	Kapfenberg
17:30	Pichorner 116'	Report	Ohio 95'	Stadium: Franz Fekete Stadium; Attendance: 2,000; Referee: Sebastian Gishamer
	Penalties
	Cetina (penalty scored); Graschi (penalty scored); Pichorner (penalty scored); Shabanhaxhaj (penalty scored); Grgić (penalty missed); N'Zi (penalty scored)		(penalty scored) Fitz; (penalty scored) Mühl; (penalty scored) Fischer; (penalty missed) Suttner; (penalty scored) Djuricin; (penalty missed) Ohio

21 September 2021	SC Schwaz	2–3	St. Pölten	Sankt Pölten
17:30	Dornauer 64'; Jawadi 81'	Report	Riegler 35'; Schütz 44', 51'	Stadium: Silberstadt Arena; Attendance: 200; Referee: Arnes Talic

21 September 2021	SKU Amstetten	1–0	Wacker Innsbruck	Amstetten
18:00	Roman 26'	Report		Stadium: Ertl Glas Stadion; Attendance: 1,010; Referee: Alexander Harkam

21 September 2021	ASV Seigendorf	1–6	Wolfsberger AC	Wolfsberg
18:00	Secco 34'	Report	Baribo 8'; Taferner 14', 18'; Baumgartner 28'; Boakye 82'; Dieng 87' (pen.)	Stadium: Lavanttal-Arena; Attendance: 910; Referee: Harald Lechner

21 September 2021	FC Blau-Weiß Linz	4–0	TWL Elektra	Linz
18:00	Surdanovic 4', 13'; Seidl 52'; Plojer 75'	Report		Stadium: Linzer Stadion; Attendance: 400; Referee: Alan Kijas

21 September 2021	SK Treibach	1–5	Floridsdorfer AC	Vienna
18:00	Vaschauner 16'	Report	Ungar 3'; Komornyik 11', 45'; Mihajlović 13'; Krainz 20'	Stadium: Turnerwald-Stadion; Attendance: 250; Referee: Christian Petru-Ciochirca

21 September 2021	Union Raiffeisen Gurten	0–1	TSV Hartberg	Hartberg
18:00		Report	Niemann 50'	Stadium: Stadion Hartberg; Attendance: 650; Referee: Josef Spurny

21 September 2021	SC Weiz	1–0	SC Austria Lustenau	Weiz
18:00	Krajcer 73'	Report		Stadium: Siemens Energy Stadion; Attendance: 350; Referee: Alain Sadikovski

21 September 2021	SK Vorwärts Steyr	1–3	SV Ried	Steyr
19:25	Ikwuemesi 80'	Report	Satin 39'; Pomer 49'; Meisl 63'	Stadium: Vorwärts Stadium; Attendance: 1,100; Referee: Dieter Muckenhammer

22 September 2021	World of Jobs VFB Hohenems	0–4	Sturm Graz	Graz
17:30		Report	Sarkaria 7'; Geyrhofer 58'; Affengruber 67'; Yeboah 90+1'	Stadium: Liebenauer Stadium; Attendance: 1,300; Referee: Andreas Heiß

22 September 2021	SC Bregenz	0–7	SV Lafnitz	Lafnitz
18:00		Report	Meister 4' (pen.); Lichtenberger 14'; Hernaus 21'; Schriebl 40', 73'; Sittsam 49'; Kröpfl 85'	Stadium: Sportplatz Lafnitz; Attendance: 200; Referee: Daniel Pfister

22 September 2021	TSV St. Johann	1–2	Austria Klagenfurt	Klagenfurt
18:00	Ellmer 53' (pen.)	Report	Hütter 77'; Pink 90+2'	Stadium: Wörthersee Stadion; Attendance: 500; Referee: Rene Eisner

22 September 2021	Red Bull Salzburg	8–0	SC Kalsdorf	Salzburg
19:00	Seiwald 10'; Kristensen 38' (pen.); Capaldo 40'; Okafor 44', 53'; Šeško 63'; Okoh 83'; Kjaergaard 90+1'	Report		Stadium: Red Bull Arena; Attendance: 2,300; Referee: Walter Altmann

22 September 2021	Grazer AK	2–4	WSG Tirol	Graz
19:25	Fink 37'; Perchtold 41'	Report	Müller 7'; Blume 26'; Ranacher 78'; Smith 90+5'	Stadium: Liebenauer Stadium; Attendance: 1,567; Referee: Markus Hameter

23 September 2021	LASK	3–0	SV Stripfing	Pasching
17:00	Flecker 42'; Grozdić 47' (o.g.); Michorl 90+5'	Report		Stadium: Raiffeisen Arena; Attendance: 0 Referee: Gerhard Grobelnik

23 September 2021	Admira Wacker	1–2 (a.e.t.)	Rapid Wien	Maria Enzersdorf
19:30	Mustapha 63'	Report	Ullmann 38'; Grüll 109' (pen.)	Stadium: BSFZ-Arena; Attendance: 1,200; Referee: Manuel Schüttengruber

== Third round ==
Eight third round matches were played between 26 October and 2 November 2021.

26 October 2021	SV Lafnitz	3–5 (a.e.t.)	Wolfsberger AC	Lafnitz
11:30	Wendler 23'; Baumgartner 26' (o.g.); Schriebl 68'	Report	Taferner 19'; Vizinger 38'; Wernitznig 78', 120+4'; Baumgartner 113'	Stadium: Sportplatz Lafnitz; Attendance: 840; Referee: Arnes Talic

26 October 2021	SC Weiz	1–4 (a.e.t.)	Austria Klagenfurt	Klagenfurt
14:30	Hasenhütl 50'	Report	Greil 5', 105+1'; Pecirep 97', 112'	Stadium: Wörthersee Stadion; Attendance: 900; Referee: Gabriel Gmeiner

27 October 2021	Sturm Graz	1–2	SV Ried	Graz
18:00	Jantscher 69'	Report	Bajic 36'; Meisl 52'	Stadium: Merkur-Arena; Attendance: 5,528; Referee: Sebastian Gishamer

27 October 2021	Floridsdorfer AC	0–0 (a.e.t.) (4–2 p)	Kapfenberger SV	Floridsdorf
18:00		Report		Stadium: FAC-Platz; Attendance: 700; Referee: Alan Kijas
	Penalties
	Becirovic (penalty scored); Ungar (penalty missed); Krainz (penalty scored); Felber (penalty scored); Oliveira (penalty scored)		(penalty missed) N'Zi; (penalty scored) Pichorner; (penalty missed) Grgić; (penalty scored) Graschi

27 October 2021	St. Pölten	0–3	Red Bull Salzburg	Sankt Pölten
19:00		Report	Guindo 30'; Adamu 73'; Kristensen 90+1'	Stadium: NV Arena; Attendance: 3,444; Referee: Christian-Petru Ciochirca

28 October 2021	LASK	2–1	WSG Tirol	Pasching
18:00	Horvath 30'; Michorl 34'	Report	Vrioni 49'	Stadium: Raiffeisen Arena; Attendance: 2,500; Referee: Gerhard Grobelnik

28 October 2021	SKU Amstetten	0–3	Rapid Wien	Amstetten
18:00		Report	Kara 13'; Fountas 27'; Grahovac 55'	Stadium: Ertl Glas Stadion; Attendance: 2,797; Referee: Walter Altmann

2 November 2021	FC Blau-Weiß Linz	2–3	TSV Hartberg	Linz
19:00	Seidl 71'; Plojer 81'	Report	Tadić 9', 32', 35'	Stadium: Linzer Stadion; Attendance: 1,000; Referee: Alain Sadikovski

== Quarter-finals ==
The four quarter-finals were played between 4 and 6 February 2022.

4 February 2022	Wolfsberger AC	4–2 (a.e.t.)	Floridsdorfer AC	Wolfsberg
17:00	Baribo 35'; Vizinger 46'; Röcher 118'; Jasic 120'	Report	Oliveira 20'; Rechberger 90+6'	Stadium: Lavanttal-Arena; Attendance: 300; Referee: Alexander Harkam

4 February 2022	SV Ried	2–0	Austria Klagenfurt	Ried im Innkreis
20:20	Wießmeier 50' (pen.); Mikić 79'	Report		Stadium: Josko Arena; Attendance: 1,150; Referee: Harald Lechner

5 February 2022	Rapid Wien	1–2	TSV Hartberg	Vienna
16:30	Knasmüllner 7'	Report	Heil 24'; Sturm 45+2'	Stadium: Allianz Stadion; Attendance: 2,000; Referee: Christopher Jäger

6 February 2022	Red Bull Salzburg	3–1	LASK	Salzburg
16:30	Renner 15' (o.g.); Kristensen 41'; Capaldo 48'	Report	Horvath 13'	Stadium: Red Bull Arena; Attendance: 2,000; Referee: Walter Altmann

== Semi-finals ==
The two semi-final matches were played on 2 and 16 March 2022.

2 March 2022	SV Ried	2–1	TSV Hartberg	Ried im Innkreis
18:00	Seiwald 61'; Wießmeier 71' (pen.)	Report	Sturm 76'	Stadium: Josko Arena; Attendance: 3,700; Referee: Sebastian Gishamer

16 March 2022	Wolfsberger AC	1–1 (a.e.t.) (4–5 p)	Red Bull Salzburg	Wolfsberg
18:00	Taferner 3'	Report	Šeško 77'	Stadium: Lavanttal-Arena; Attendance: 4,380; Referee: Markus Hameter
	Penalties
	Leitgeb (penalty scored); Wernitznig (penalty missed); Peretz (penalty scored); Baumgartner (penalty scored); Liendl (penalty scored)		(penalty scored) Kristensen; (penalty scored) Okafor; (penalty scored) Kjærgaard; (penalty scored) Aaronson; (penalty scored) Solet

== Final ==
The final was played on 1 May 2022.

1 May 2022
17:00

Red Bull Salzburg	3–0	SV Ried
Sučić 27'; Wöber 52'; Šeško 87'	Report

Wörthersee Stadion, Klagenfurt
Attendance: 7,800
Referee: Alexander Harkam

== Top goalscorers ==
Rank	Player	Club	Goals
1	(Slovenia) Benjamin Šeško	Red Bull Salzburg	5
2	(Austria) Stefan Nutz	SV Ried	4
2	(Austria) Dario Tadić	TSV Hartberg	4
2	(Austria) Matthäus Taferner	Wolfsberger AC	4
2	(Austria) Manprit Sarkaria	Sturm Graz	4
2	(Austria) Matthias Seidl	Blau-Weiß Linz	4
7	10 players		3

== See also ==
- 2021–22 Austrian Football Bundesliga
