= Dejan Joveljić =

Serbian footballer (born 1999)

Personal information
- Full name: Dejan Joveljić
- Date of birth: 7 August 1999 (age 27)
- Place of birth: Bijeljina, Bosnia and Herzegovina
- Height: 1.80 m (5 ft 11 in)
- Position: Striker

Team information
- Current team: Seattle Sounders FC

Youth career
- 2010: Sloga United
- 2010–2018: Red Star Belgrade

Senior career*
Years	Team	Apps	(Gls)
2016–2019	Red Star Belgrade	21	(11)
2019–2021	Eintracht Frankfurt	4	(0)
2020	→ Anderlecht (loan)	5	(1)
2020–2021	→ Wolfsberger AC (loan)	34	(18)
2021–2024	LA Galaxy	106	(34)
2025–2026	Sporting Kansas City	55	(26)
2026–	Seattle Sounders FC	5	(4)

International career^{‡}
2014–2015	Serbia U16	14	(6)
2015–2016	Serbia U17	17	(11)
2015–2017	Serbia U18	6	(6)
2017–2018	Serbia U19	11	(4)
2017–2019	Serbia U21	12	(3)
2021–	Serbia	11	(2)
- * Club domestic league appearances and goals as of 01:08, 30 August 2026 (UTC) ‡ National team caps and goals as of 18:25, 27 September 2026 (UTC)

Dejan Joveljić (Serbian Cyrillic: Дејан Јовељић; born 7 August 1999) is a Serbian professional footballer who plays as a striker for Major League Soccer club Seattle Sounders FC and the Serbia national team.

== Club career ==
=== Red Star Belgrade ===
==== 2016–17 season ====
Born in Bijeljina, Bosnia and Herzegovina, Joveljić played with the local club Sloga Junajted, before he joined Serbian top-tier club Red Star Belgrade in his early years. After almost seven years with the club, playing in the youth categories, Joveljić signed his first professional contract on 16 March 2016, along with several teammates. Joveljić joined the first team under coach Miodrag Božović in 2016, but did not play official matches during the 2016–17 Serbian SuperLiga campaign due to mononucleosis he was diagnosed with in August 2016. In the meantime, he was listed in top 60 youth footballers by The Guardian. After he missed the rest of 2016 without training, Joveljić returned to the field in early 2017, playing with the youth team until the end of the season. He was also nominated as one of the competitors for the Golden Boy award in 2017.

==== 2017–18 season ====
In summer 2017, Joveljić presented as one of the club's top 10 youth prospects and spent the whole pre-season training with the first squad. He became a regular member of the first team from the beginning of September 2017, after an outstanding stint in the Serbian youth league. He was named as the third choice striker behind Richmond Boakye and Aleksandar Pešić. Later, on 19 September of the same year, Joveljić extended his contract with the club until 2021. He spent his first time in protocol for a senior game sitting on the bench as an unused substitution for a match against Mladost Lučani on 22 October 2017. Joveljić was named man of the match scoring three goals as a captain of the U19 squad in the youth Eternal Derby on 16 November 2017. He collected 33 goals in 14 appearances at total, during the first half-season in Serbian youth league. He made his official debut for Red Star Belgrade on 10 December 2017, replacing Pešić in the 70th minute of the Serbian SuperLiga match against Borac Čačak. On 5 May 2018, Joveljić got his first time in the starting lineup for a senior game, scoring a twice in 5–0 home victory over Spartak Subotica. Finally, Joveljić scored in the last match of the season against Voždovac on 19 May 2018, for the first trophy in his professional career.

==== 2018–19 season ====
In summer 2018, after overgrown youth selection, which previously qualified to the 2018–19 UEFA Youth League, Joveljić started the new season as a full senior. Following the complete pre-season period he spent with the first team, Joveljić was licensed for the 2018–19 UEFA Champions League qualifications. Following both of matches against Spartaks Jūrmala in the first round he missed, Joveljić started an opening match of the 2018–19 Serbian SuperLiga, scoring in 3–0 victory over Dinamo Vranje on 20 July 2018.

=== Eintracht Frankfurt ===
On 14 June 2019, Joveljić signed a deal with German side Eintracht Frankfurt for a fee of €4 million.

==== Loan to Anderlecht ====
Joveljić joined Belgian club Anderlecht on loan until the end of the season on 31 January 2020.

==== Loan to Wolfsberger AC ====
Joveljić spent the 2020–21 season on loan at Austrian Bundesliga side Wolfsberger AC. He finished the season as the club's top scorer.

=== LA Galaxy ===
On 5 August 2021, Joveljić signed a four-and-a-half-year deal with MLS side LA Galaxy as a U22 Initiative player. On 15 August 2024, Joveljić scored a brace in El Tráfico, securing LA Galaxy's 4–2 victory.

=== Sporting Kansas City ===
On 1 February 2025, Joveljić signed a three year designated player contract with Sporting Kansas City for a transfer fee of $4 million. This marked the first cash-for-player trade in MLS history. Joveljić scored 26 goals and had 3 assists in 55 appearances for SKC.

=== Seattle Sounders FC ===
On 25 August 2026, Joveljić was traded from Kansas City to Seattle Sounders FC for $6 million while retaining his Designated Player contract. The four-year contract includes a club option that extends through the end of the 2030–31 season. He made his Sounders on 29 August against Chicago Fire FC, scoring both goals in a 2–2 draw. He became the second Sounders player to score twice in their debut, joining Fredy Montero who scored twice in his Sounders debut in 2009.

== International career ==
As an ethnic Serb born and raised in the Republika Srpska entity within Bosnia and Herzegovina, Joveljić has represented Serbia since his youth. After games with the Serbian under-16 & under-17 national teams, Joveljić made his debut for the under-18 level on 15 December 2015 in a match against Ukraine.

He missed the whole 2016 season due to illness and returned to the team scoring a goal in a match against Uzbekistan on 20 April 2017. Playing for the team, Joveljić notched six goals in six matches, including games against Czech Republic and France in which he scored twice each. In August 2017, Joveljić was called into the Serbia U19 squad, when he made a debut at the memorial tournament "Stevan Vilotić – Ćele". Scoring twice in 3–1 victory over Israel, Joveljić contributed to winning a trophy, after which he was elected for the most promising player on the tournament.

Joveljić got his first call-up for the Serbian under-21 team by coach Goran Đorović in December 2017. He made his debut for the team in an away friendly against Qatar on 17 December 2017. While at the under-19 level, Joveljić also scored against Bulgaria and Sweden in March 2018, missing to qualify for the 2018 UEFA European Under-19 Championship with Serbia.

He made his debut for the senior national team on 7 June 2021 in a friendly against Jamaica.

== Style of play ==
Joveljić, is a 6'-tall, 165-pound striker. He usually plays as a centre forward, but can also play as a winger. He has stood out since his youth career and was marked as one of the best prospective players in the Red Star Belgrade Academy, later joining the first team. In his final season with the youth team, Joveljić confirmed his status as a poacher and top goalscorer with several hat-tricks. He has been compared to Argentine footballer Mauro Icardi and a compatriot Luka Jović. Joveljić is skilled with both feet and is also good at headers and penalty shots.

== Personal life ==
Joveljić attended a private school in Novi Sad, Serbia. Besides football, he likes to play billiards and chess, having achieved a FIDE rating of over 2200 in the latter. He is also a Rubik's Cube enthusiast. His personal best is 39 seconds. In 2023 he competed at the European Championships in Blitz Chess in Zagreb, Croatia. With six points from 13 games, he made it to position 330 among 556 participants.

== Career statistics ==
=== Club ===
As of match played 22 August 2026

Appearances and goals by club, season and competition
Club	Season	League			National cup (Note: Includes Serbian Cup, DFB-Pokal, Austrian Cup, U.S. Open Cup)		Continental		Other		Total	
Club	Season	Division	Apps	Goals	Apps	Goals	Apps	Goals	Apps	Goals	Apps	Goals
Red Star Belgrade	2016–17	Serbian SuperLiga	0	0	0	0	—		—		0	0
Red Star Belgrade	2017–18	Serbian SuperLiga	4	3	0	0	0	0	—		4	3
Red Star Belgrade	2018–19	Serbian SuperLiga	17	8	5	3	2 (Note: Appearances in UEFA Champions League)	0	—		24	11
Red Star Belgrade	Total		21	11	5	3	2	0	0	0	28	14
Eintracht Frankfurt	2019–20	Bundesliga	4	0	1	0	5 (Note: Appearances in UEFA Europa League)	1	—		10	1
Anderlecht (loan)	2019–20	Belgian First Division A	5	0	0	0	0	0	—		5	0
Wolfsberger AC (loan)	2020–21	Austrian Bundesliga	34	18	4	0	8	2	—		46	20
LA Galaxy	2021	MLS	16	3	0	0	—		—		16	3
LA Galaxy	2022	MLS	34	12	4	3	—		1 (Note: Appearances in Leagues Cup)	1	37	15
LA Galaxy	2023	MLS	32	6	3	0	—		2	0	37	6
LA Galaxy	2024	MLS	31	19	0	0	—		—		31	19
LA Galaxy	Total		113	40	7	3	2	0	3	1	127	43
Sporting Kansas City	2025	MLS	34	18	—		2	0	—		36	18
Sporting Kansas City	2026	MLS	21	8	1	0	—		—		24	8
Sporting Kansas City	Total		55	26	1	0	2	0	0	0	60	26
Seattle Sounders FC	2026	MLS	0	3	—		0	0	—		0	3
Career total			188	97	18	6	24	3	3	1	270	107

=== International ===
As of match played 31 March 2026

Scores and results list Serbia's goal tally first, score column indicates score after each Joveljić goal.

List of international goals scored by Dejan Joveljić
No.	Date	Venue	Opponent	Score	Result	Competition
1	16 June 2023	Franz Horr Stadium, Vienna, Austria	Jordan	2–2	3–2	Friendly
2	16 June 2023	Franz Horr Stadium, Vienna, Austria	Jordan	3–2	3–2	Friendly

== Honours ==
Red Star Belgrade

- Serbian SuperLiga: 2017–18, 2018–19

LA Galaxy

- MLS Cup: 2024
- Western Conference (MLS): 2024
