= Eliel Peretz =

Israeli footballer (born 1996)

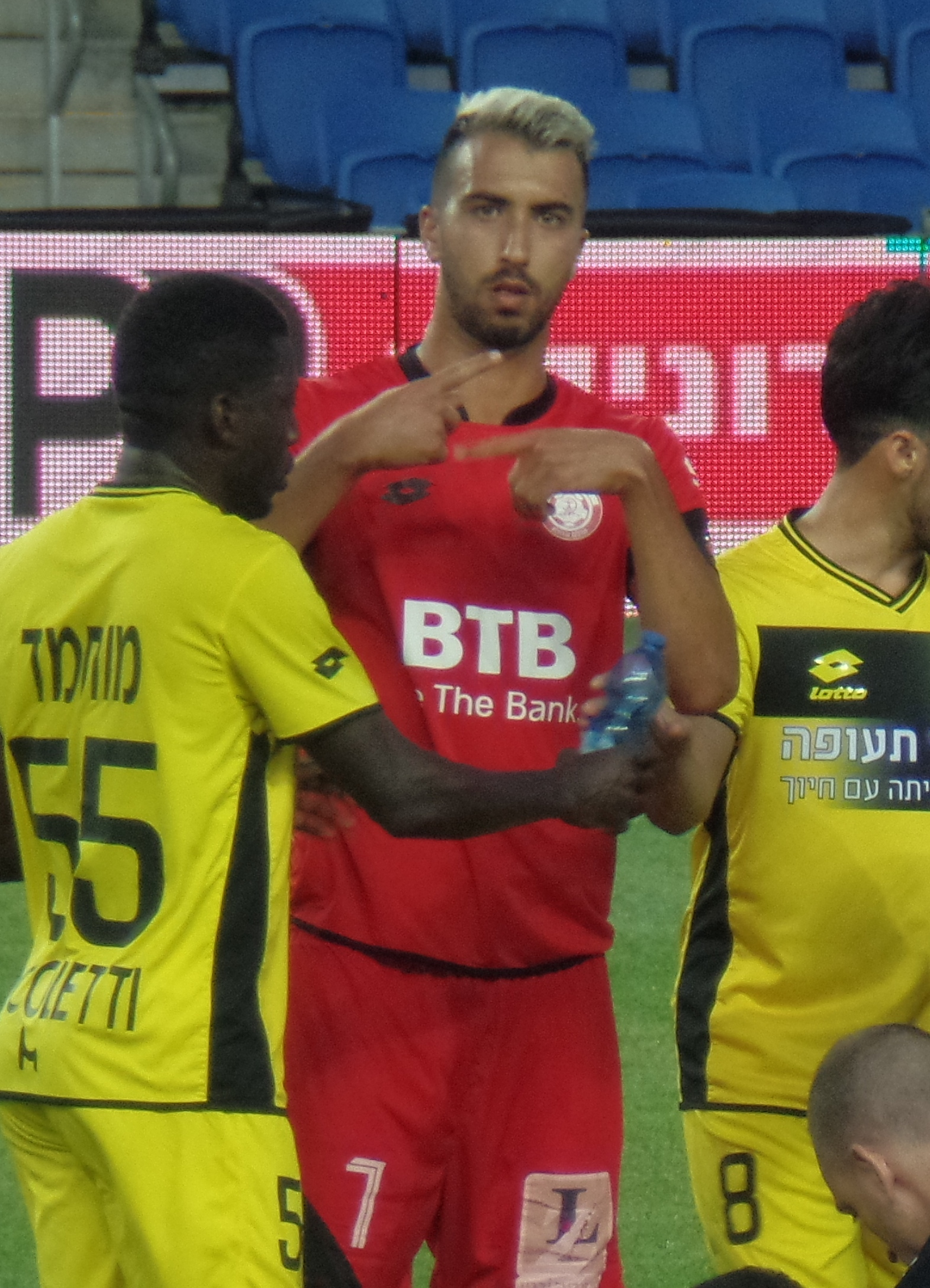
- Peretz playing for Hapoel Hadera in 2019

Personal information
- Date of birth: 18 November 1996 (age 30)
- Place of birth: Bat Yam, Israel
- Height: 1.89 m (6 ft 2 in)
- Position: Attacking midfielder

Team information
- Current team: Hapoel Be'er Sheva
- Number: 7

Youth career
- 2005–2008: Hapoel Tzafririm Holon
- 2008–2016: Maccabi Tel Aviv

Senior career*
Years	Team	Apps	(Gls)
2016–2019	Maccabi Tel Aviv	11	(0)
2017–2018	→ Bnei Yeuhda Tel Aviv	22	(1)
2018–2019	→ Hapoel Hadera	29	(4)
2019–2020	Hapoel Hadera	22	(9)
2020–2022	Wolfsberg	43	(11)
2022–2023	Hapoel Haifa	23	(2)
2023–2024	Apollon Limassol	34	(8)
2024–	Hapoel Be'er Sheva	71	(14)

International career^{‡}
2016–2017	Israel U21	9	(2)
2024–	Israel	18	(1)
- * Club domestic league appearances and goals as of 18:00, 24 October 2026 (UTC) ‡ National team caps and goals as of 07:23, 18 November 2026 (UTC)

Eliel Peretz (Hebrew: אליאל פרץ; born 18 November 1996) is an Israeli professional footballer who plays as an attacking midfielder for Israeli Premier League club Hapoel Be'er Sheva and the Israel national team.

== Early life ==
Peretz was born in Bat Yam, Israel, to an Israeli family of both Sephardi Jewish and Mizrahi Jewish descent.

He also holds a Portuguese passport, on account of his Sephardi Jewish ancestors, which eases the move to certain European football leagues.

== Club career ==
On 19 June 2020, Peretz signed a two-year contract with Austrian club, Wolfsberger AC.

== International career ==
Peretz made his debut for the Israel national team on 8 June 2024 in a 0–3 friendly loss against Hungary at the Nagyerdei Stadion. He substituted Gadi Kinda at half-time.

== Career statistics ==
=== Club ===
As of match played 10 July 2025

Club	Season	League			National cup (Note: Includes Israel State Cup, Austrian Cup, Cypriot Cup)		League cup (Note: Includes Toto Cup)		Continental		Other		Total	
Club	Season	Division	Apps	Goals	Apps	Goals	Apps	Goals	Apps	Goals	Apps	Goals	Apps	Goals
Maccabi Tel Aviv	2015–16	Israeli Premier League	2	0	2	0	0	0	0	0	0	0	4	0
Maccabi Tel Aviv	2016–17	Israeli Premier League	9	0	4	0	5	0	2 (Note: Appearances in UEFA Europa League)	0	–		20	0
Maccabi Tel Aviv	2017–18	Israeli Premier League	0	0	0	0	3	0	2	0	–		5	0
Maccabi Tel Aviv	2018–19	Israeli Premier League	–		–		1	0	–		–		1	0
Maccabi Tel Aviv	Total		11	0	6	0	9	0	4	0	0	0	30	0
Bnei Yehuda (loan)	2017–18	Israeli Premier League	22	1	1	0	2	0	–		–		25	1
Hapoel Hadera (loan)	2018–19	Israeli Premier League	29	4	5	1	0	0	–		–		34	5
Hapoel Hadera	2019–20	Israeli Premier League	22	9	0	0	5	1	–		–		27	10
Hapoel Hadera	Total		51	13	5	1	5	1	–		–		61	15
Wolfsberger AC	2020–21	Austrian Bundesliga	15	4	3	0	–		6	0	1 (Note: Appearance in Austrian Bundesliga European competition play-offs)	0	25	4
Wolfsberger AC	2021–22	Austrian Bundesliga	28	7	5	0	–		–		–		33	7
Wolfsberger AC	Total		43	11	8	0	–		6	0	1	0	58	11
Hapoel Haifa	2022–23	Israeli Premier League	23	2	1	0	1	1	–		–		25	3
Apollon Limassol	2023–24	Cypriot First Division	34	8	3	0	–		–		–		37	8
Hapoel Be'er Sheva	2024–25	Israeli Premier League	31	6	3	0	0	0	2 (Note: Appearances in UEFA Conference League)	0	–		36	6
Hapoel Be'er Sheva	2025–26	Israeli Premier League	0	0	0	0	0	0	1	0	1 (Note: Appearance in Israel Super Cup)	1	2	1
Hapoel Be'er Sheva	Total		31	6	3	0	0	0	3	0	1	1	38	7
Career total			215	41	27	1	17	2	13	0	2	1	274	45

=== International ===
As of match played 1 October 2026

Appearances and goals by national team and year
National team	Year	Apps	Goals
Israel	2024	2	0
Israel	2025	10	1
Israel	2026	5	0
Total		17	1

Scores and results list Israel's goal tally first, score column indicates score after each Peretz goal.

List of international goals scored by Eliel Peretz
No.	Date	Venue	Opponent	Score	Result	Competition
1	16 November 2025	Zimbru Stadium, Chișinău, Moldova	Moldova	3–1	4–1	2026 FIFA World Cup qualification

== Honours ==
Hapoel Beer Sheva

- Israeli Premier League: 2025–26
- Israel State Cup: 2024–25
- Israel Super Cup: 2025
