= Kai Stratznig =

Austrian footballer (born 2002)

Personal information
- Full name: Kai Lukas Stratznig
- Date of birth: 15 April 2002 (age 24)
- Place of birth: Spittal an der Drau, Austria
- Height: 1.83 m (6 ft 0 in)
- Position: Midfielder

Team information
- Current team: First Vienna
- Number: 28

Youth career
- 2007–2016: SC Mühldorf
- 2016–2020: Wolfsberger AC

Senior career*
| Years | Team | Apps | (Gls) |
| 2019–2022 | Wolfsberger AC II | 32 | (0) |
| 2020–2022 | Wolfsberger AC | 44 | (0) |
| 2023– | First Vienna | 81 | (1) |

International career^{‡}
| 2021 | Austria U21 | 3 | (0) |
- * Club domestic league appearances and goals as of 17 May 2026 ‡ National team caps and goals as of 8 October 2021

Kai Lukas Stratznig (born 15 April 2002) is an Austrian professional footballer who plays as a midfielder for First Vienna.

== Club career ==
Born in Spittal an der Drau, Stratznig grew up in Mühldorf and began his career at the local club SC Mühldorf. Ahead of the 2016–17 season, he joined the academy of Wolfsberger AC. In March 2019, he made his debut for the reserve team in the Austrian Regionalliga against FC Wels. By the end of the 2018–19 season, he had made 11 appearances at the third level.

In June 2020, Stratznig was included in the first-team squad for the first time for the match against Sturm Graz. He made his Bundesliga debut the same month when he came on as a substitute for Romano Schmid in the 75th minute of a 4–2 loss to TSV Hartberg on 10 June. He made his first appearance in the starting eleven on 21 June in a 2–2 draw against Red Bull Salzburg.

He suffered an ankle injury in a game against Red Bull Salzburg in February 2022, ruling him out for an extended period. Stratznig left Wolfsberger AC as his contract expired at the end of the 2021–22 season, after declining an extension offer by the club. On 23 February 2023 he joined Second League club First Vienna FC.

== International career ==
In March 2021, Stratznig made his international debut for the Austria U21 team against Saudi Arabia.

== Career statistics ==
=== Club ===
As of match played 20 February 2022

Appearances and goals by club, season and competition
| Club | Season | League | | | Cup | | Continental | | Other | | Total | |
| Club | Season | Division | Apps | Goals | Apps | Goals | Apps | Goals | Apps | Goals | Apps | Goals |
|---|---|---|---|---|---|---|---|---|---|---|---|---|
| Wolfsberger AC II | 2018–19 | Regionalliga | 11 | 0 | – | | – | | 0 | 0 | 11 | 0 |
| Wolfsberger AC II | 2019–20 | Regionalliga | 17 | 0 | – | | – | | 0 | 0 | 17 | 0 |
| Wolfsberger AC II | 2020–21 | Regionalliga | 3 | 0 | – | | – | | 0 | 0 | 3 | 0 |
| Wolfsberger AC II | Total | | 31 | 0 | 0 | 0 | 0 | 0 | 0 | 0 | 31 | 0 |
| Wolfsberger AC | 2019–20 | Bundesliga | 4 | 0 | 0 | 0 | 0 | 0 | — | | 4 | 10 |
| Wolfsberger AC | 2020–21 | Bundesliga | 23 | 0 | 2 | 0 | 7 (Note: Appearance(s) in UEFA Europa League) | 0 | 1 (Note: Appearance(s) in Europa Conference League play-offs) | 0 | 33 | 0 |
| Wolfsberger AC | 2021–22 | Bundesliga | 17 | 0 | 4 | 0 | — | | — | | 21 | 0 |
| Wolfsberger AC | Total | | 44 | 0 | 6 | 0 | 7 | 0 | 1 | 0 | 58 | 0 |
| Career total | | | 75 | 0 | 6 | 0 | 7 | 0 | 1 | 0 | 89 | 0 |
