= Luka Lochoshvili =

Georgian footballer

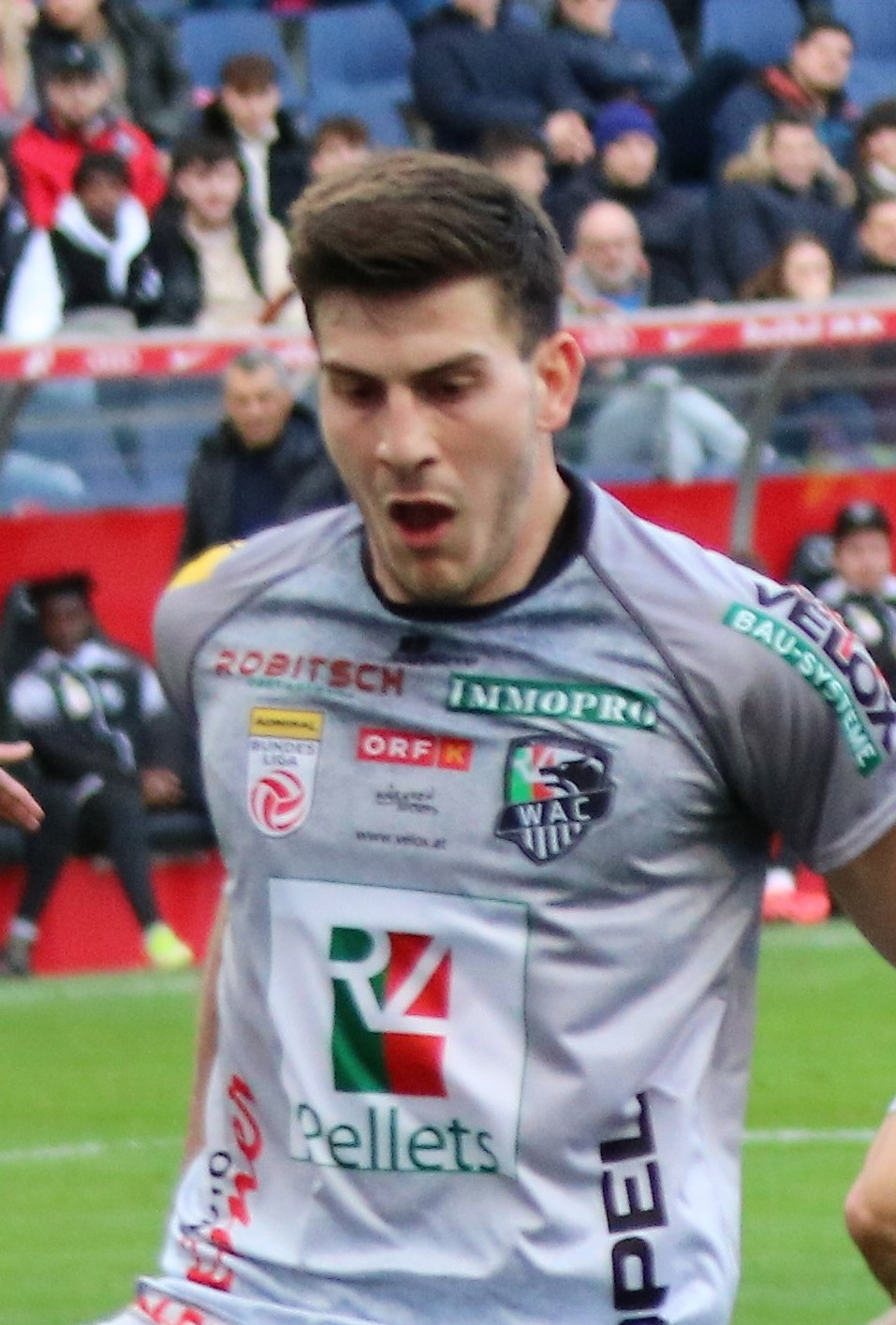
- Lochoshvili playing for Wolfsberger AC in 2022

Personal information
- Date of birth: 29 May 1998 (age 28)
- Place of birth: Tbilisi, Georgia
- Height: 1.91 m (6 ft 3 in)
- Position: Centre-back

Team information
- Current team: 1. FC Köln
- Number: 24

Youth career
- 2014–2016: Dinamo Tbilisi
- 2017–2019: Dynamo Kyiv

Senior career*
Years	Team	Apps	(Gls)
2014	Dinamo Tbilisi B	1	(0)
2016–2017	Dinamo Tbilisi	22	(1)
2017–2019	Dynamo Kyiv	0	(0)
2018	→ Dinamo Tbilisi (loan)	21	(0)
2019	→ Žilina B (loan)	10	(1)
2019	→ Žilina (loan)	3	(0)
2020	Dinamo Tbilisi	10	(0)
2020–2022	Wolfsberger AC	53	(2)
2022–2025	Cremonese	54	(1)
2025	→ Salernitana (loan)	18	(0)
2025–2026	1. FC Nürnberg	33	(5)
2026–	1. FC Köln	7	(0)

International career^{‡}
2014–2015	Georgia U17	6	(0)
2015–2016	Georgia U19	7	(0)
2017–2020	Georgia U21	15	(2)
2021–	Georgia	38	(4)
- * Club domestic league appearances and goals as of 24 October 2026 ‡ National team caps and goals as of 18 November 2026

Luka Lochoshvili (Order of Honor) (Georgian: ლუკა ლოჩოშვილი; born 29 May 1998) is a Georgian professional footballer who plays as a centre-back for German Bundesliga club 1. FC Köln and the Georgia national team.

== Club career ==
=== Dinamo Tbilisi ===
Lochoshvili initially played in Dinamo Tbilisi youth teams before his promotion to the first team in 2016. He made a debut in a 4–0 win against Lokomotive Tbilisi on 18 November 2016.

=== Dinamo Kyiv ===
The next summer, Lochoshvili signed a five-year deal with Dinamo Kyiv, although in March 2018 was loaned back to his boyhood club and later, in February 2019, to Slovak side Žilina.

==== Loan to Žilina ====
Lochoshvili made his professional Fortuna Liga debut for Žilina against DAC Dunajská Streda on 6 April 2019.

=== Dinamo Tbilisi ===
In early 2020, Dinamo Kyiv and Lochoshvili terminated the existing contract. The player spent next several months at Dinamo Tbilisi.

=== Wolfsberger AC ===
In mid 2020, Lochoshvili moved to Austria to join Wolfsberger AC. He opened his goal account in a 5–3 away win against Austria Wien on 21 March 2021.

In February 2022, while playing for Wolfsberger AC against Austria Wien in Vienna, Lochoshvili took out the tongue of Austria player Georg Teigl. Teigl collided with an opposition player and was lying unconscious, unable to breathe, as he had swallowed his own tongue. Shortly afterwards, Lochoshvili was awarded with the Dignity Cross by the grateful Carinthia state governor. He won the Fair Play award at The Best FIFA Football Awards 2022 for his actions. The only goal scored by Lochoshvili in the 2021–22 season in a 4–1 away victory over Sturm Graz was recognized as the best of week 31 by fans.

=== Cremonese ===
On 10 August 2022, Lochoshvili signed with Cremonese in Italy. He made a first appearance for his new club against AS Roma on 22 August. Lochoshvili netted his first Serie A goal in a 3–2 away win over Sampdoria on 8 April 2023.

==== Salernitana (loan) ====
On 10 January 2025, Lochoshvili joined Serie B side Salernitana on loan for the remainder of the season with the option to buy.

=== 1. FC Nürnberg ===
On 12 July 2025, Lochoshvili moved to Germany and signed with 1. FC Nürnberg in 2. Bundesliga.

=== 1. FC Köln ===
On 2 July 2026, Lochoshvili moved to 1. FC Köln in the German top-tier Bundesliga on a three-year deal.

== International career ==
Lochoshvili made his debut for the Georgia national football team on 5 September 2021 in a World Cup qualifier against Spain, a 4–0 away loss. He started the game and played the whole match.

On 12 October 2023, he scored in a friendly match against Thailand scoring the sixth goal just before half time.

Lochoshvili received a call-up to the national team for the 2024 UEFA Euro and took part in all four matches that Georgia played in the tournament. On 2 July 2024, along with other squad members he was awarded the Order of Honour.

== Career statistics ==
=== Club ===
As of 24 October 2026

Appearances and goals by club, season and competition
Club	Season	League			National cup (Note: Includes Georgian Cup, Austrian Cup, Coppa Italia, DFB-Pokal)		Europe		Other		Total	
Club	Season	Division	Apps	Goals	Apps	Goals	Apps	Goals	Apps	Goals	Apps	Goals
Dinamo Tbilisi II	2013–14	Pirveli Liga	1	0	—		—		—		1	0
Dinamo Tbilisi	2016	Umaglesi Liga	5	0	1	0	—		—		6	0
Dinamo Tbilisi	2017	Erovnuli Liga	17	1	1	0	—		—		18	1
Dinamo Tbilisi	Total		22	1	2	0	—		—		24	1
Dinamo Tbilisi (loan)	2018	Erovnuli Liga	21	0	2	0	2 (Note: Appearances in UEFA Europa League)	0	—		25	0
Žilina (loan)	2018–19	Slovak First Football League	3	0	0	0	—		—		3	0
Žilina II (loan)	2018–19	Slovak 2. Liga	5	1	—		—		—		5	1
Žilina II (loan)	2019–20	Slovak 2. Liga	5	0	—		—		—		5	0
Žilina II (loan)	Total		10	1	—		—		—		10	1
Dinamo Tbilisi	2020	Erovnuli Liga	10	0	—		1 (Note: Appearance in UEFA Champions League)	0	1 (Note: Appearance in Georgian Super Cup)	0	12	0
Wolfsberger AC	2020–21	Austrian Bundesliga	21	1	4	0	8	0	1 (Note: Appearance in Austrian Bundesliga play-offs)	0	34	1
Wolfsberger AC	2021–22	Austrian Bundesliga	29	1	4	0	—		—		33	1
Wolfsberger AC	2022–23	Austrian Bundesliga	2	0	1	0	1	0	—		4	0
Wolfsberger AC	Total		52	2	9	0	9	0	1	0	71	2
Cremonese	2022–23	Serie A	25	1	2	0	—		—		27	1
Cremonese	2023–24	Serie B	24	0	2	0	—		2 (Note: Appearances in Serie B play-offs)	0	28	0
Cremonese	2024–25	Serie B	7	0	1	0	—		—		8	0
Cremonese	Total		56	1	5	0	—		2	0	63	1
Salernitana (loan)	2024–25	Serie B	18	0	—		—		2	0	20	0
1. FC Nürnberg	2025–26	2. Bundesliga	33	5	1	0	—		—		34	5
1. FC Köln	2026–27	Bundesliga	7	0	1	0	—		—		8	0
Career total			233	10	20	0	12	0	6	0	271	10

=== International ===
As of match played 17 November 2026

Appearances and goals by national team and year
National team	Year	Apps	Goals
Georgia	2021	2	0
Georgia	2022	3	0
Georgia	2023	5	1
Georgia	2024	10	0
Georgia	2025	8	2
Georgia	2026	10	1
Total		38	4

Scores and results list Georgia's goal tally first, score column indicates score after each Lochoshvili goal.

List of international goals scored by Luka Lochoshvili
No.	Date	Venue	Opponent	Score	Result	Competition
1	12 October 2023	Mikheil Meskhi Stadium, Tbilisi, Georgia	Thailand	2–0	8–0	Friendly
2	5 June 2025	Boris Paichadze Dinamo Arena, Tbilisi, Georgia	Faroe Islands	1–0	1–0	Friendly
3	18 November 2025	Vasil Levski National Stadium, Sofia, Bulgaria	Bulgaria	1–2	1–2	2026 FIFA World Cup qualification
4	5 June 2026	Mikheil Meskhi Stadium, Tbilisi, Georgia	Bahrain	1–0	2–0	Friendly

== Honours ==
Dinamo Tbilisi

- David Kipiani Cup: 2014–15, 2015–16; runner-up: 2018
- Georgian Super Cup runner-up: 2020

Žilina

- Slovak Cup runner-up: 2018–19

Individual

- Best young player of Georgia: 2020
- FIFA Fair Play Award: 2022
