= Amar Hodzić =

Austrian footballer

Amar Hodžić
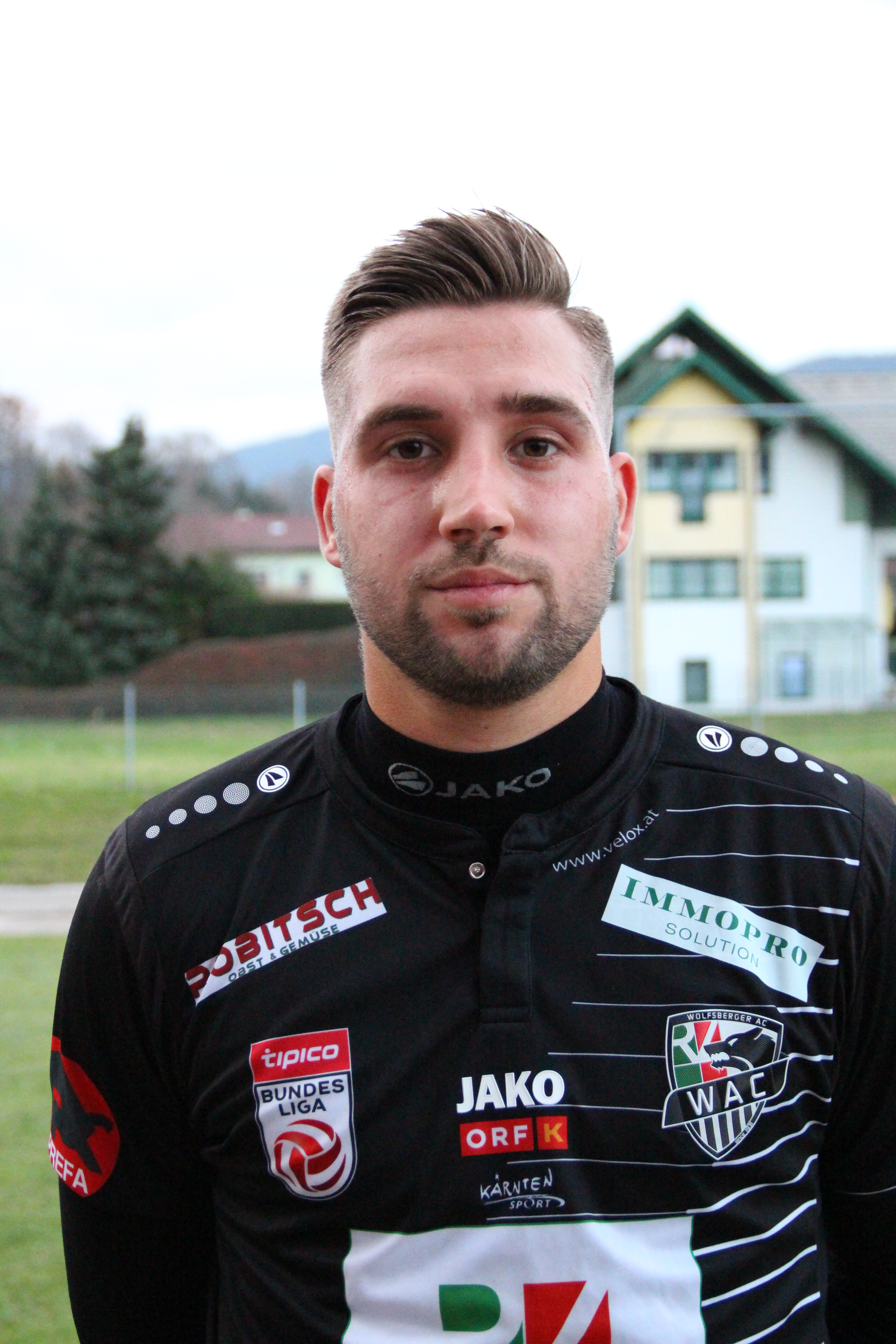

Personal information
- Date of birth: 12 July 1999 (age 27)
- Place of birth: Klagenfurt, Austria
- Height: 1.86 m (6 ft 1 in)
- Position: Forward

Team information
- Current team: WSC Hertha Wels
- Number: 9

Youth career
- 2006–2012: SV Tainach
- 2012–2013: VST Völkermarkt
- 2013–2014: SV Tainach
- 2014–2016: Wolfsberger AC

Senior career*
| Years | Team | Apps | (Gls) |
| 2015–2021 | Wolfsberger AC II | 63 | (32) |
| 2017–2021 | Wolfsberger AC | 6 | (0) |
| 2020 | → Vorwärts Steyr (loan) | 2 | (0) |
| 2021– | WSC Hertha Wels | 40 | (20) |
- * Club domestic league appearances and goals as of 20:03, 21 November 2022 (UTC)

Amar Hodžić (born 12 July 1999) is an Austrian football player. He plays for WSC Hertha Wels.

== Career ==
=== Club career ===
He made his Austrian Football Bundesliga debut for Wolfsberger AC on 19 August 2017 in a game against FC Admira Wacker Mödling. On 9 January 2020, Hodžić joined SK Vorwärts Steyr on loan for the rest of the season.
