= Dario Vizinger =

Croatian footballer (born 1998)

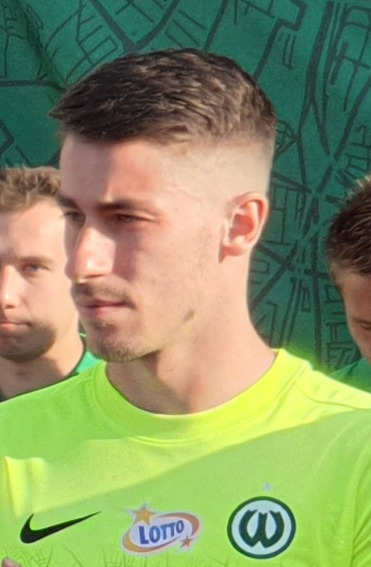
- Vizinger with Warta Poznań in 2023

Personal information
- Date of birth: 6 June 1998 (age 28)
- Place of birth: Čakovec, Croatia
- Height: 1.81 m (5 ft 11 in)
- Position: Forward

Team information
- Current team: Maribor
- Number: 29

Youth career
- 2007–2009: Međimurje
- 2009–2010: Sloboda Varaždin
- 2010–2015: Varaždin
- 2015–2016: Rijeka

Senior career*
Years	Team	Apps	(Gls)
2014–2015	Varaždin	14	(6)
2015–2018	Rijeka	2	(0)
2015–2016	Rijeka II	20	(7)
2017	→ Hrvatski Dragovoljac (loan)	12	(2)
2017	→ Rudar Velenje (loan)	12	(2)
2018–2020	Celje	80	(35)
2020–2023	Wolfsberger AC	67	(11)
2022–2023	→ SSV Jahn Regensburg (loan)	9	(0)
2023–2024	Warta Poznań	29	(1)
2024–2026	Mura	53	(22)
2026–	Maribor	28	(2)

International career
2015	Croatia U18	4	(0)
2016	Croatia U19	8	(0)
2018	Croatia U20	2	(0)
2019–2021	Croatia U21	6	(2)
- * Club domestic league appearances and goals as of 22 November 2026

Dario Vizinger (born 6 June 1998) is a Croatian professional footballer who plays as a forward for Slovenian PrvaLiga club Maribor.

== Club career ==
=== Varaždin ===
Vizinger made his senior club debut for NK Varaždin on 24 August 2014. During the 2014–15 season of the 3. HNL, he scored six goals.

=== Rijeka ===
In June 2015, Vizinger signed a contract with HNK Rijeka of the Croatian top division. In his first season with the club, Vizinger mainly featured for Rijeka II in the 3. HNL, scoring seven goals in twenty appearances. On 7 May 2016, he made his official début for the first team, when he entered as a substitute in an away draw against NK Osijek in the 35th round of the 2015–16 season.

==== Loans ====
After not making a single appearance in the first half of the 2016–17 season, he was sent on loan to second division side Hrvatski Dragovoljac in February 2017. He made 12 appearances in the Croatian Second Football League for the club, in which he scored twice. For the 2017–18 season, Vizinger was loaned to Slovenian first division club Rudar Velenje, scoring two goals in 12 appearances during the first half of the season.

=== Celje ===
In January 2018, the loan was terminated prematurely and Vizinger was signed on a permanent contract by Velenje's league rivals Celje. Initially struggling to find the net, he would make his breakthrough in the 2019–20 season, making 35 league appearances and scoring 23 goals, making him second on the top goalscorers list in the league, only behind Ante Vukušić, as Celje won the league title. He received the award for the best young player of the season and was named 2019–20 PrvaLiga Team of the Year.

=== Wolfsberger AC ===
On 8 September 2020, Vizinger signed a four-year contract with Austrian Bundesliga club Wolfsberger AC. He made his debut on the opening day of the 2020–21 season against Red Bull Salzburg on 13 September 2020, coming off the bench and scoring his first goal in a 3–1 defeat. His team having qualified for the group stage of the 2020–21 UEFA Europa League, Vizinger scored the winner of the 1–0 victory against CSKA Moscow on 3 December 2020.

== Honours ==
Celje

- Slovenian PrvaLiga: 2019–20

Individual

- Slovenian PrvaLiga Team of the Year: 2019–20
- Slovenian PrvaLiga Young Player of the Year: 2019–20
