= Jonathan Scherzer =

Austrian footballer

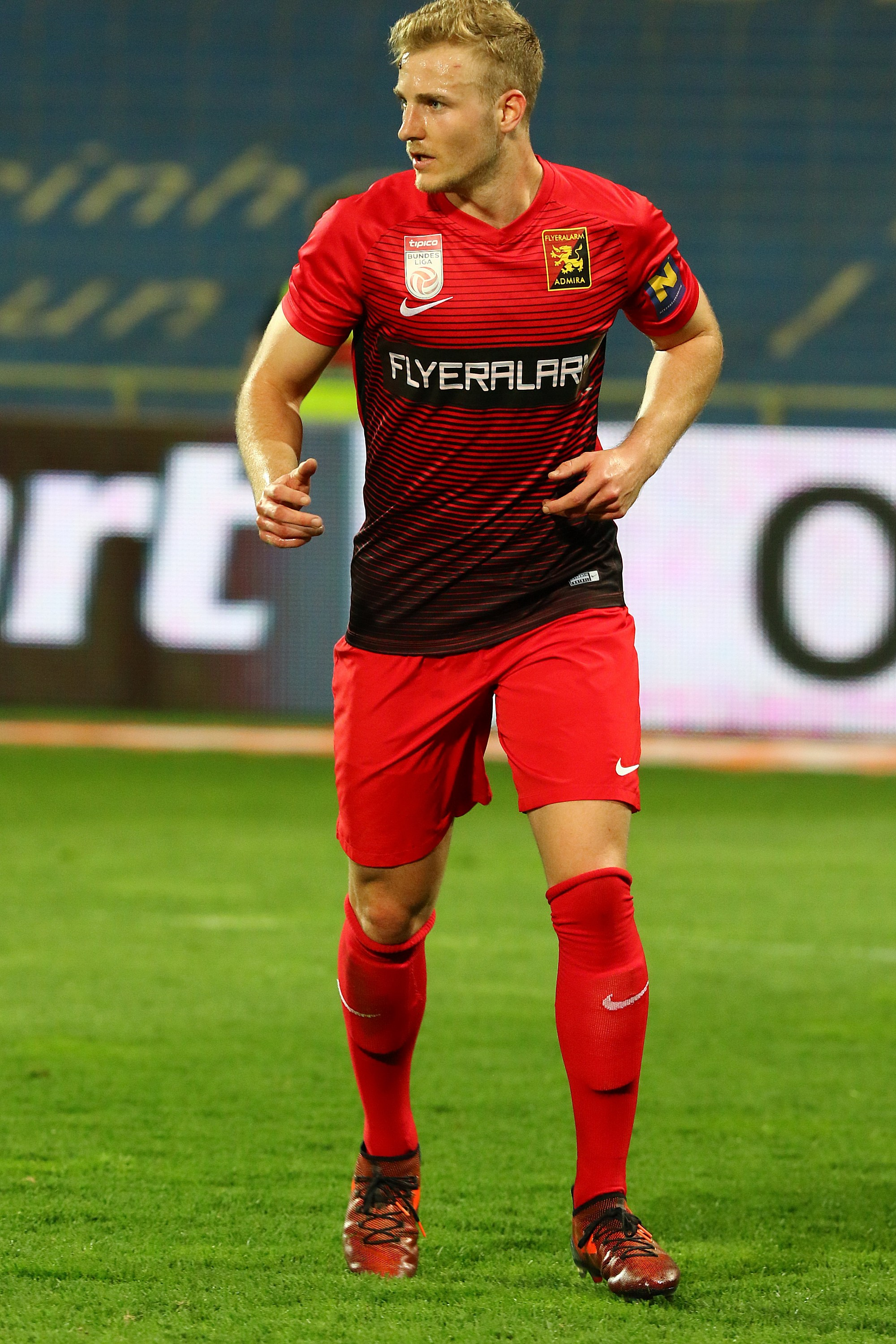

Personal information
- Date of birth: 22 July 1995 (age 31)
- Place of birth: Spittal an der Drau, Austria
- Height: 1.85 m (6 ft 1 in)
- Position: Left-back

Youth career
- 2001–2008: Spittal/Drau
- 2008–2009: Athens United
- 2009–2010: Borussia Mönchengladbach
- 2011–2013: 1860 Munich
- 2013–2014: FC Augsburg
- 2017–2018: Admira Wacker

Senior career*
Years	Team	Apps	(Gls)
2013–2017	FC Augsburg II	74	(7)
2018–2020	Admira Wacker II	53	(8)
2018–2020	Admira Wacker	28	(1)
2020–2025	Wolfsberger AC	81	(1)
2025–2026	Ried	10	(0)
- * Club domestic league appearances and goals as of 10 June 2026

Jonathan Scherzer (born 22 July 1995) is an Austrian professional footballer who plays as left-back.

== Career ==
Scherzer was born in Spittal an der Drau, Carinthia, Austria, and began his footballing career at Spittal/Drau in 2001. His father, a veterinarian, was offered a position as a professor at the University of Georgia, and he moved with his family to the United States, joined the Athens United youth teams in 2008. From there he moved to Borussia Mönchengladbach in Germany and later 1860 Munich.

In January 2018, Scherzer joined FC Admira Wacker Mödling.

On 20 May 2020, he signed with Wolfsberger AC.
