= 2020–21 Austrian Football Bundesliga =

109th season of top-tier football league in Austria

Austrian Bundesliga
- Season: 2020–21
- Dates: 11 September 2020 – 23 May 2021
- Champions: Red Bull Salzburg (15th title)
- Relegated: St. Pölten
- Champions League: Red Bull Salzburg; Rapid Wien
- Europa League: Sturm Graz
- Europa Conference League: LASK; Austria Wien
- Matches: 192
- Goals: 497 (2.59 per match)
- Top goalscorer: Patson Daka (27 goals)
- Biggest home win: Red Bull Salzburg 7–1 Hartberg (4 October 2020)
- Biggest away win: St. Pölten 2–8 Red Bull Salzburg (28 November 2020)
- Highest scoring: St. Pölten 2–8 Red Bull Salzburg (28 November 2020)
- Longest winning run: 6 matches Red Bull Salzburg
- Longest unbeaten run: 7 matches Red Bull Salzburg; Rapid Wien
- Longest winless run: 8 matches Ried
- Longest losing run: 5 matches Ried; Hartberg

The 2020–21 Austrian Football Bundesliga, also known as Tipico Bundesliga for sponsorship reasons, was the 109th season of top-tier football in Austria. Red Bull Salzburg were the seven-times defending champions.

== Teams ==
=== Changes ===
Mattersburg withdrew from the Bundesliga after 17 seasons due to filing for insolvency, sparing WSG Tirol from relegation. SV Ried was promoted as champions of the 2019–20 Austrian Football Second League after having been relegated from the Bundesliga at the end of the 2016–17 season.

=== Stadia and locations ===
Location of teams in the 2020–21 Austrian Football Bundesliga

Team	Location	Venue	Capacity
Admira Wacker Mödling	Maria Enzersdorf	BSFZ-Arena	7,000
Austria Wien	Vienna	Generali Arena	17,500
LASK	Linz	Waldstadion Pasching	6,009
Rapid Wien	Vienna	Allianz Stadion	28,000
Red Bull Salzburg	Wals-Siezenheim	Red Bull Arena	17,218 (30,188)
Rheindorf Altach	Altach	Stadion Schnabelholz	8,500
St. Pölten	Sankt Pölten	NV Arena	8,000
Sturm Graz	Graz	Merkur-Arena	16,364
SV Ried	Ried im Innkreis	Keine Sorgen Arena	7,680
TSV Hartberg	Hartberg	Stadion Hartberg	4,635
Wolfsberger AC	Wolfsberg	Lavanttal-Arena	7,300
WSG Tirol	Innsbruck	Tivoli Stadion Tirol	16,008

== Regular season ==
=== League table ===
Pos	Team	Pld	W	D	L	GF	GA	GD	Pts	Qualification
1	Red Bull Salzburg	22	17	1	4	67	24	+43	52	Qualification for the Championship round
2	Rapid Wien	22	13	6	3	43	25	+18	45	Qualification for the Championship round
3	LASK	22	13	3	6	42	21	+21	42	Qualification for the Championship round
4	Sturm Graz	22	11	6	5	34	20	+14	39	Qualification for the Championship round
5	Wolfsberger AC	22	10	3	9	40	39	+1	33	Qualification for the Championship round
6	WSG Tirol	22	8	6	8	37	34	+3	30	Qualification for the Championship round
7	Hartberg	22	7	8	7	25	38	−13	29	Qualification for the Relegation round
8	Austria Wien	22	6	7	9	31	32	−1	25	Qualification for the Relegation round
9	St. Pölten	22	5	6	11	33	43	−10	21	Qualification for the Relegation round
10	Rheindorf Altach	22	6	3	13	20	43	−23	21	Qualification for the Relegation round
11	Ried	22	4	4	14	21	46	−25	16	Qualification for the Relegation round
12	Admira Wacker Mödling	22	3	5	14	22	50	−28	14	Qualification for the Relegation round

Source: Austrian Football Bundesliga
Rules for classification: 1) Points; 2) Goal difference; 3) Goals scored; 4) Matches won; 5) Away matches won; 6) Head-to-head points; 7) Head-to-head goal difference; 8) Head-to-head goals scored.

=== Results ===
Home \ Away	ADM	AWI	ALT	HAR	LIN	WAT	RWI	RBS	STP	STU	RIE	WOL
Admira Wacker Mödling	—	0–4	3–1	2–3	1–2	1–1	0–1	1–0	0–5	0–0	3–1	1–3
Austria Wien	2–2	—	5–1	0–1	1–1	2–2	0–0	0–2	1–1	0–4	2–1	3–5
Rheindorf Altach	4–2	0–0	—	1–1	0–1	0–2	0–0	0–2	0–4	2–1	2–1	0–2
Hartberg	2–1	2–1	1–0	—	1–1	1–0	1–3	0–3	3–3	1–1	1–1	0–2
LASK	4–0	1–0	3–0	1–2	—	2–4	1–2	0–1	4–0	2–0	3–0	3–1
WSG Tirol	3–0	0–2	3–1	1–1	1–1	—	1–1	2–4	0–1	1–1	1–3	4–1
Rapid Wien	4–1	1–1	3–1	4–0	3–0	0–3	—	1–1	2–1	4–1	1–0	1–0
Red Bull Salzburg	3–1	3–1	4–1	7–1	3–1	5–0	4–2	—	4–1	1–3	3–0	2–3
St. Pölten	2–2	0–2	0–1	2–2	1–3	0–1	1–2	2–8	—	0–0	4–0	0–2
Sturm Graz	3–0	2–1	4–0	2–1	0–2	1–0	1–1	2–1	3–0	—	2–1	1–2
SV Ried	0–0	0–1	1–4	2–0	0–3	3–2	4–3	1–3	1–1	0–2	—	0–4
Wolfsberger AC	2–1	3–2	0–1	0–0	0–3	3–5	3–4	1–3	2–4	0–0	1–1	—

Source: soccerway.com
Legend: Blue = home team win; Yellow = draw; Red = away team win.

== Championship round ==
The points obtained during the regular season were halved (and rounded down) before the start of the playoff. As a result, the teams started with the following points before the playoff: Red Bull Salzburg 26, Rapid Wien 22, LASK 21, Sturm Graz 19, Wolfsberger AC 16, and WSG Tirol 15. The points of Rapid Wien, Sturm Graz and Wolfsberger AC were rounded down – in the event of any ties on points at the end of the playoffs, a half point will be added for these teams.

Pos	Team	Pld	W	D	L	GF	GA	GD	Pts	Qualification	RBS	RWI	STU	LIN	WOL	WAT
1	Red Bull Salzburg (C)	32	25	2	5	94	33	+61	51	Qualification for the Champions League play-off round	—	2–0	3–1	2–0	1–1	4–0
2	Rapid Wien	32	17	8	7	64	40	+24	36	Qualification for the Champions League second qualifying round	0–3	—	0–0	3–0	1–2	4–0
3	Sturm Graz	32	16	8	8	52	34	+18	36	Qualification for the Europa League play-off round	1–3	4–1	—	3–1	0–1	3–2
4	LASK	32	15	6	11	55	41	+14	30	Qualification for the Europa Conference League third qualifying round	2–5	1–1	0–0	—	2–1	3–3
5	Wolfsberger AC	32	13	5	14	52	62	−10	27	Qualification for the Europa Conference League play-off final	1–2	1–8	1–3	0–4	—	2–0
6	WSG Tirol	32	10	8	14	53	60	−7	23		3–2	2–3	2–3	2–0	2–2	—

Legend: Blue = home team win; Yellow = draw; Red = away team win.
Rules for classification: 1) Points; 2) Points with (possible) half points subtracted due to rounding; 3) Goal difference; 4) Goals scored; 5) Matches won; 6) Away matches won; 7) Head-to-head points; 8) Head-to-head goal difference; 9) Head-to-head goals scored.
(C) Champions

== Relegation round ==
The points obtained during the regular season were halved (and rounded down) before the start of the playoff. As a result, the teams started with the following points before the playoff: Hartberg 14, Austria Wien 12, St. Pölten 10, Rheindorf Altach 10, Ried 8, and Admira Wacker Mödling 7. The points of Hartberg, Austria Wien, St. Pölten and Rheindorf Altach were rounded down – in the event of any ties on points at the end of the playoffs, a half point will be added for these teams.

Pos	Team	Pld	W	D	L	GF	GA	GD	Pts	Qualification	HAR	AWI	RIE	ALT	ADM	STP
1	Hartberg	32	12	11	9	38	48	−10	32	Qualification for the Europa Conference League play-off semi-final	—	1–0	1–1	2–1	2–0	0–0
2	Austria Wien (O)	32	11	9	12	47	43	+4	29	Qualification for the Europa Conference League play-off semi-final	3–1	—	2–2	2–0	0–0	2–1
3	Ried	32	8	9	15	34	57	−23	25		3–2	3–2	—	0–0	0–0	2–1
4	Rheindorf Altach	32	9	7	16	33	55	−22	23		2–2	2–1	3–0	—	0–1	1–0
5	Admira Wacker Mödling	32	6	8	18	27	58	−31	19		0–1	0–2	0–2	1–1	—	2–0
6	St. Pölten (R)	32	5	9	18	39	57	−18	13	Qualification for the relegation play-offs (Note: Since the top two teams of the 2020–21 Austrian Football Second League did not receive a license for the Bundesliga, relegation play-offs will be played between the last-placed club from the Bundesliga and the best-placed club with a license from the Second League.)	0–1	1–2	0–0	3–3	0–1	—

Legend: Blue = home team win; Yellow = draw; Red = away team win.
Rules for classification: 1) Points; 2) Points with (possible) half points subtracted due to rounding; 3) Goal difference; 4) Goals scored; 5) Matches won; 6) Away matches won; 7) Head-to-head points; 8) Head-to-head goal difference; 9) Head-to-head goals scored.
(O) Play-off winners; (R) Relegated

== Europa Conference League play-offs ==
The winner and the runner-up of the relegation round played a one-legged play-off semi-final match against each other. The winner played a two-legged final against the fifth-placed team from the championship round to determine the qualifier to the Europa Conference League second qualifying round.

=== Semi-final ===
24 May 2021
17:00

Hartberg	0–3	Austria Wien
	Report	Wimmer 35'; Fitz 51'; Pichler 78'

Stadion Hartberg, Hartberg
Referee: Walter Altmann

=== Final ===
27 May 2021
19:00

Austria Wien	3–0	Wolfsberger AC
Sarkaria 2'; Djuricin 46', 72'	Report

Generali Arena, Vienna
Referee: Manuel Schüttengruber
30 May 2021
17:00

Wolfsberger AC	1–2	Austria Wien
Joveljić 25'	Report	Djuricin 24' (pen.); Monschein 68'

Lavanttal-Arena, Wolfsberg
Referee: Alexander Harkam

Austria Wien won 5–1 on aggregate.

== Relegation play-offs ==
Since the top two teams of the 2020–21 Austrian Football Second League did not receive a license for the Bundesliga, relegation play-offs were played between the last-placed club from the Bundesliga and the best-placed club with a license from the Second League.

26 May 2021
18:00

Austria Klagenfurt	4–0	St. Pölten
Miesenböck 33'; Pink 39', 90+1'; Gezos 72' (pen.)	Report

Wörthersee Stadion, Klagenfurt
Referee: Sebastian Gishamer
29 May 2021
17:00

St. Pölten	0–1	Austria Klagenfurt
	Report	Pink 86'

NV Arena, Sankt Pölten
Referee: Harald Lechner

Austria Klagenfurt won 5–0 on aggregate.

== Statistics ==
=== Top scorers ===
Rank	Player	Club	Goals
1	(Zambia) Patson Daka	Red Bull Salzburg	27
2	(Denmark) Nikolai Baden Frederiksen	WSG Tirol	18
2	(Serbia) Dejan Joveljić	Wolfsberger AC	18
4	(Austria) Ercan Kara	Rapid Wien	15
5	(Germany) Mërgim Berisha	Red Bull Salzburg	14
5	(Mali) Sékou Koïta	Red Bull Salzburg	14
7	(Austria) Alexander Schmidt	St. Pölten	13
8	(Germany) Johannes Eggestein	LASK	12
8	(Austria) Christoph Knasmüllner	Rapid Wien	12
10	(Austria) Marco Grüll	Ried	11

== Awards ==
=== Annual awards ===
Award	Winner	Club
Player of the Year	(Zambia) Patson Daka	Red Bull Salzburg
Top goalscorer	(Zambia) Patson Daka	Red Bull Salzburg
Manager of the Year	(United States) Jesse Marsch	Red Bull Salzburg
Breakthrough of the Year	(Austria) Saša Kalajdžić	VfB Stuttgart

Team of the Year
Goalkeeper	Patrick Pentz (Austria Wien)			
Defence	(Denmark) Rasmus Kristensen (Red Bull Salzburg)	(Brazil) André Ramalho (Red Bull Salzburg)	(Austria) David Nemeth (Sturm Graz)	(Austria) Andreas Ulmer (Red Bull Salzburg)
Midfield	(Zambia) Enock Mwepu (Red Bull Salzburg)	(Slovenia) Jon Gorenc Stanković (Sturm Graz)	(Austria) Zlatko Junuzović (Red Bull Salzburg)	(Austria) Jakob Jantscher (Sturm Graz)
Attack	(Zambia) Patson Daka (Red Bull Salzburg)		(Austria) Ercan Kara (Rapid Wien)	
