= João Oliveira (footballer, born 1998) =

Portuguese footballer

Personal information
- Full name: João Miguel e Melo de Oliveira
- Date of birth: 13 September 1998 (age 28)
- Place of birth: Setúbal, Portugal
- Height: 1.90 m (6 ft 3 in)
- Position: Striker

Team information
- Current team: Belenenses
- Number: 11

Youth career
- 2007–2016: Vitória Setúbal
- 2016: Benfica
- 2017: Belenenses

Senior career*
Years	Team	Apps	(Gls)
2017	Real Massamá	0	(0)
2018	Estrela Vendas Novas	14	(4)
2018-2020	Estoril	1	(0)
2020-2021	Olhanense	8	(1)
2021–2022	Floridsdorfer AC	25	(10)
2022–2023	Torreense	13	(0)
2023	→ Amora (loan)	11	(3)
2023–2026	Amora	58	(24)
2026–	Belenenses	4	(1)
- * Club domestic league appearances and goals as of 13 September 2026

João Miguel e Melo de Oliveira (born 13 September 1998) is a Portuguese footballer who plays for Liga 3 club Belenenses as a forward.

== Football career ==
He made his professional debut for Estoril on 28 December 2019 in the LigaPro.
