= Michael Liendl =

Austrian footballer

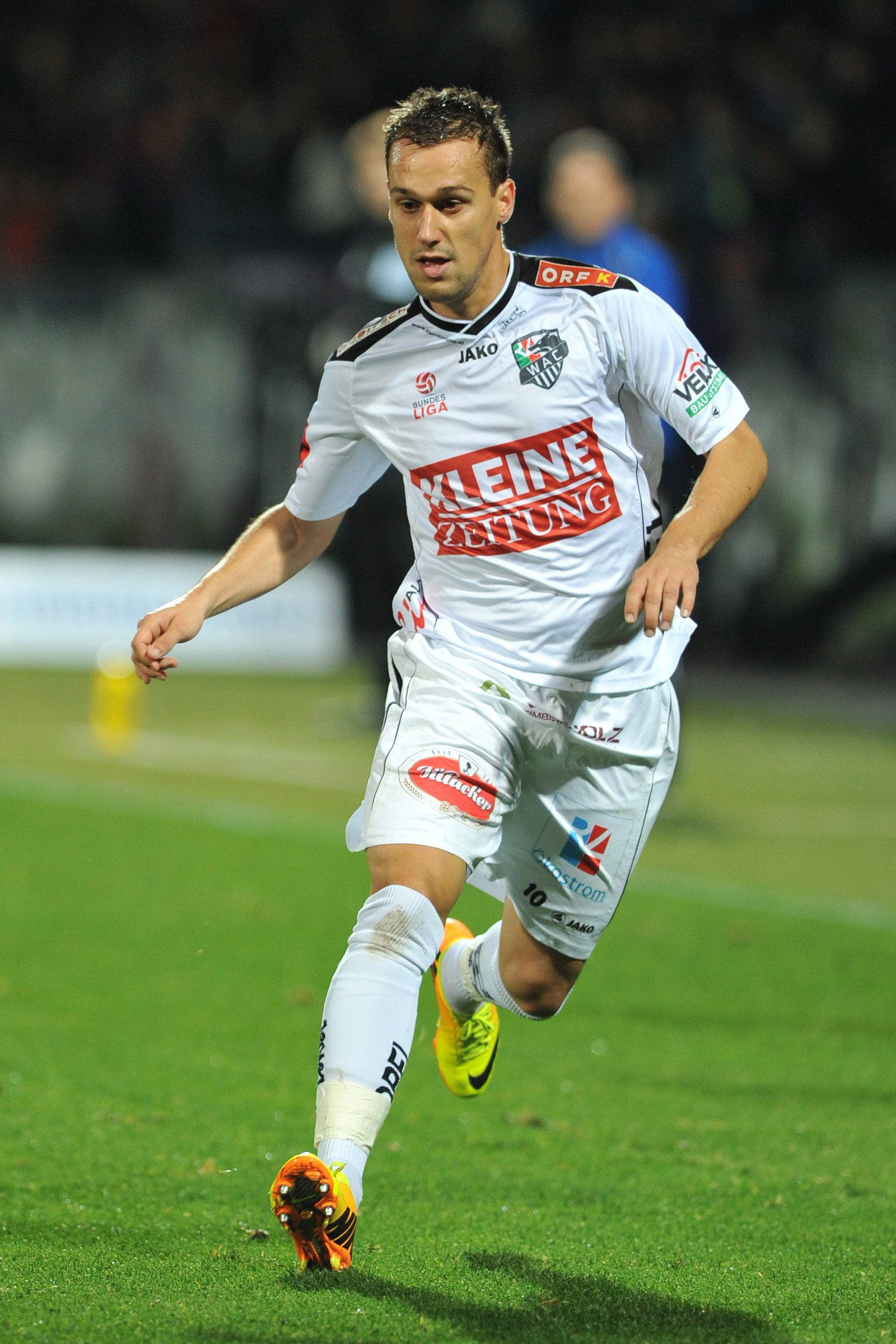
- Michael Liendl in 2013

Personal information
- Date of birth: 25 October 1985 (age 41)
- Place of birth: Graz, Austria
- Height: 1.75 m (5 ft 9 in)
- Position: Midfielder

Youth career
- 1992–1994: FC Nenzing
- 1994–2003: FC Thüringen

Senior career*
Years	Team	Apps	(Gls)
2003	Grazer AK	0	(0)
2004–2009	Kapfenberger SV	159	(37)
2009–2012	Austria Wien	82	(10)
2012–2014	Wolfsberger AC	57	(20)
2014–2015	Fortuna Düsseldorf	52	(11)
2015–2017	1860 Munich	57	(12)
2017–2018	Twente	15	(0)
2018–2022	Wolfsberger AC	129	(35)
2022–2023	Grazer AK	30	(7)

International career
	Austria U-17	10	(0)
	Austria U-19	3	(0)
2014	Austria	1	(0)
- * Club domestic league appearances and goals as of 20 June 2023

Michael Liendl (born 25 October 1985) is a retired Austrian professional association football player who was the central midfielder for WAC.

== Club career ==
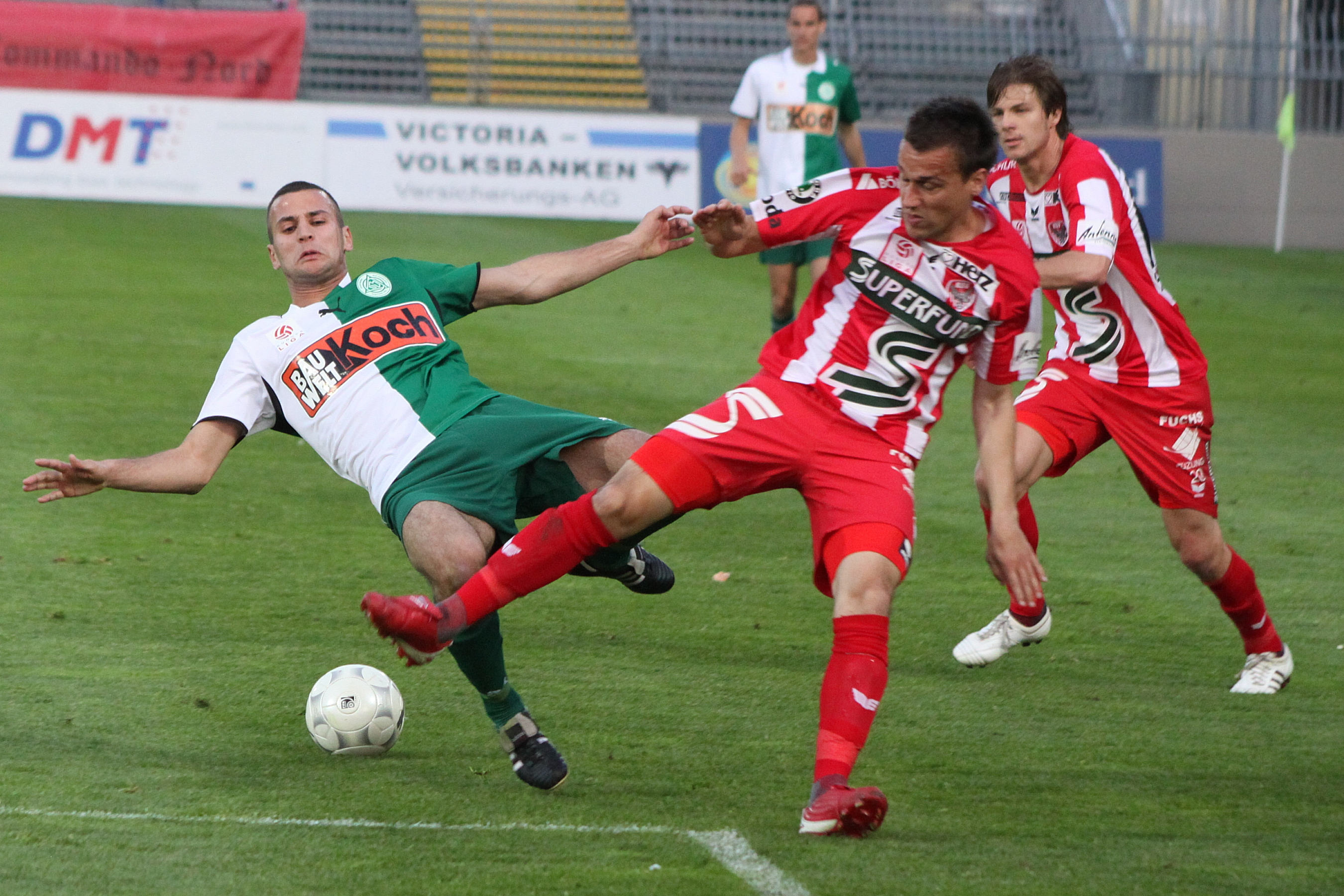
Michael Liendl (middle)

Michael Liendl began his career playing for FC Nenzing and FC Thüringen. He later played for Grazer AK, Kapfenberger SV, Austria Wien and Wolfsberger AC, before moving to Germany to join Fortuna Düsseldorf in 2014, and 1860 Munich in 2015.

He then played for Dutch club Twente, before returning to Austria to rejoin Wolfsberger AC in 2018. On 29 October 2020, Liendl scored a hat-trick in a 4–1 away win over Feyenoord in the 2020–21 UEFA Europa League, becoming the third oldest player to achieve that feat, behind only Zlatan Ibrahimović and Aritz Aduriz.

On 2 June 2022, Liendl returned to Grazer AK, the club where he began his professional career, signing a one-year contract.

== International career ==
On 3 June 2014, he made his debut for the Austria national football team under coach Marcel Koller, in a friendly away match against Czech Republic, in which he came on as a substitute to Andreas Ivanschitz in the 63rd minute. However, the match ended in a 2–1 win for Austria.

== Sports commentator ==
Michael Liendl has been a co-commentator for ORF broadcasts of the Austrian National Soccer Team games since 2024.

== Honours ==
Kapfenberger SV

- Austrian Football First League: 2007–08

Individual

- Austrian Football First League Footballer of the Year: 2008
