= Markus Hameter =

Austrian football referee (born 1980)

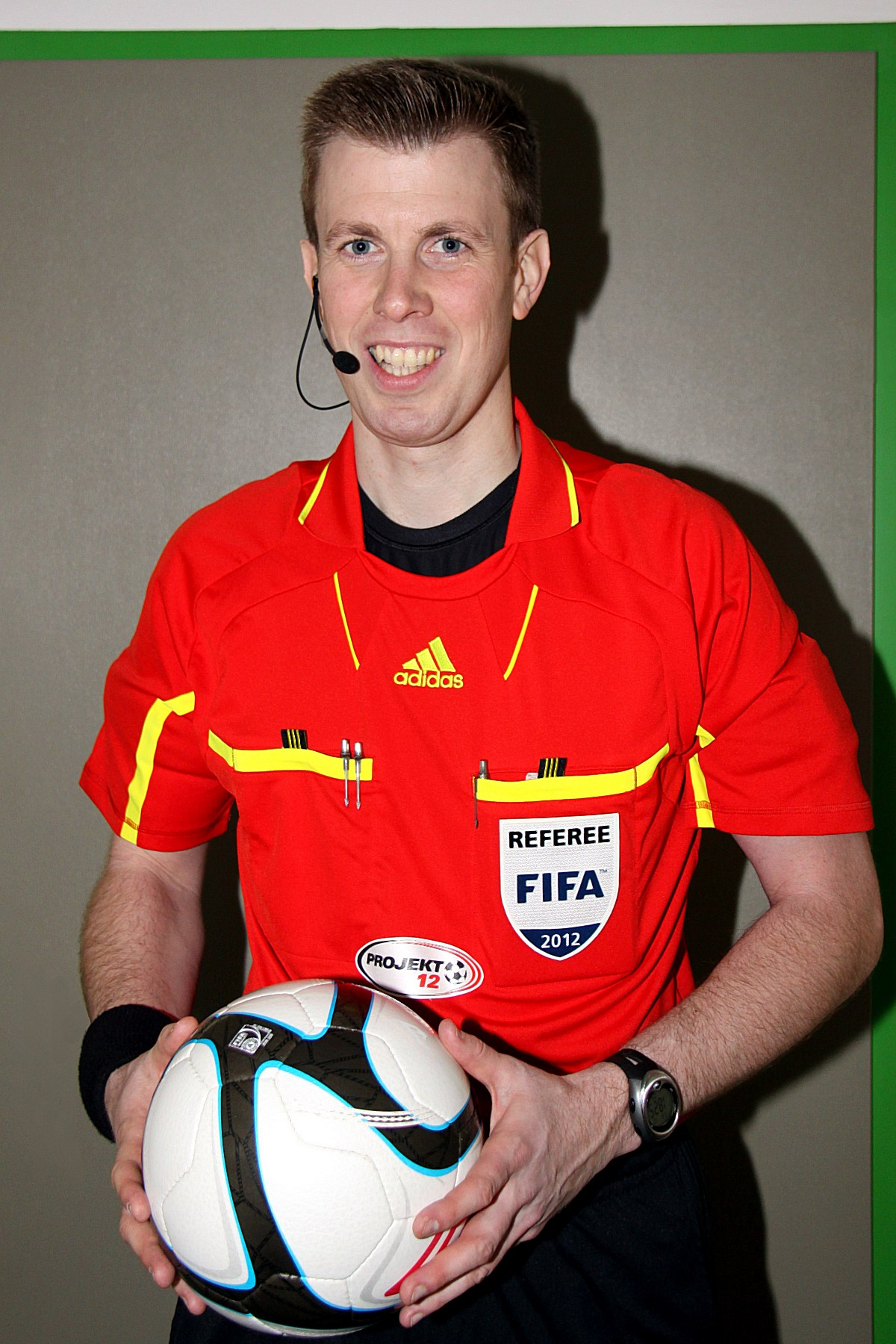
- Hameter in 2012
- Born: 11 April 1980 (age 46)

Domestic
Years	League	Role
1996–	ÖFB-Schiedsrichter	Referee
2004–	Regionalliga	Referee
2008–	2. Liga	Referee
2009–	Bundesliga	Referee

International
Years	League	Role
2012–2017	FIFA-listed	Referee

Markus Hameter (born 11 April 1980) is an Austrian football referee. He has refereed in the Austrian Bundesliga, the Swiss Super League and in international games featuring Georgia, Ukraine, Slovakia, Finland and Iran. Since 2012 he is FIFA listed.
