= Matthäus Taferner =

Austrian footballer

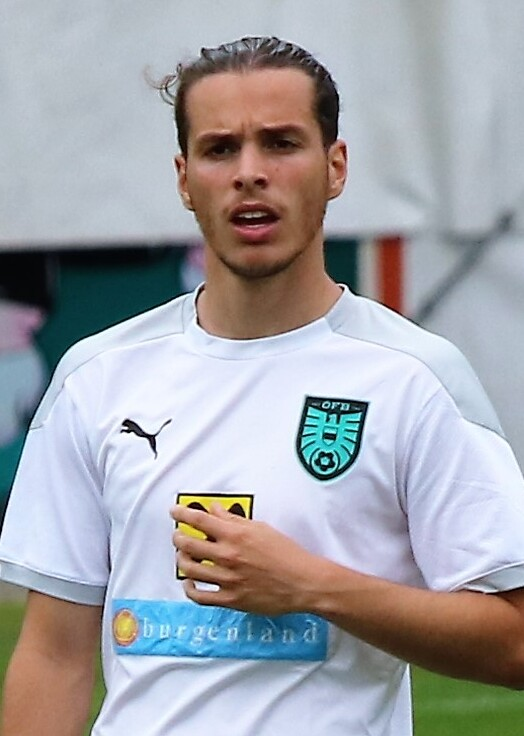
- Taferner in 2022

Personal information
- Date of birth: 30 January 2001 (age 25)
- Place of birth: Klagenfurt, Austria
- Height: 1.70 m (5 ft 7 in)
- Position: Midfielder

Youth career
- 2007–2017: Wacker Innsbruck

Senior career*
Years	Team	Apps	(Gls)
2017–2019	Wacker Innsbruck II	45	(6)
2017–2019	Wacker Innsbruck	29	(3)
2019–2020	Dynamo Dresden	4	(0)
2020	→ Wacker Innsbruck (loan)	9	(1)
2020–2023	Wolfsberger AC	86	(2)
2023–	WSG Tirol	83	(3)

International career^{‡}
2016	Austria U15	3	(0)
2017	Austria U16	1	(0)
2017–2018	Austria U17	5	(1)
2018	Austria U18	2	(0)
2018	Austria U19	2	(0)
2019	Austria U20	1	(0)
2021–2022	Austria U21	11	(0)
- * Club domestic league appearances and goals as of 7 September 2026 ‡ National team caps and goals as of 3 June 2022

Matthäus Taferner (born 30 January 2001) is an Austrian professional footballer who plays as midfielder for WSG Tirol.

== Club career ==
=== Wacker Innsbruck ===
Taferner began his career at Wacker Innsbruck. In 2015 he joined the Fußballakademie Tirol, while attending the Bundes-Oberstufenrealgymnasium Innsbruck, a gymnasium with a branch for competitive athletes.

On 27 May 2017, Taferner, who had already attracted the interest of German club SC Freiburg, made his debut for the reserve team of Wacker Innsbruck in the Austrian Regionalliga when he was substituted in place of Sandro Gavrić in the 60th minute of a 2–1 loss to USC Eugendorf.

In September 2017, Taferner was promoted to the first team by coach Karl Daxbacher. He made his debut in the second-tier First League in the same month when he was substituted for Daniele Gabriele in the 84th minute of the Tyroleans' 4–0 away win over Austria Lustenau on 29 September 2017. This appearance meant that he became the first player in the second tier of Austrian football who was born in the 21st century. With Wacker Innsbruck he won promotion to the Austrian Football Bundesliga at the end of the season.

He made his debut in the Bundesliga in April 2019 in a 3–1 defeat against SV Mattersburg. The following month he scored his first goal in the highest Austrian league in a 4–0 win, also against Mattersburg. At the end of the season, he suffered relegation with Innsbruck after one season, finishing in last place in the Bundesliga table.

=== Dynamo Dresden ===
On 25 June 2019, 2. Bundesliga club Dynamo Dresden confirmed that they had signed Taferner from Wacker Innsbruck on a four-year contract. In Dresden, the midfielder only played four times and was sent on loan to his former club Wacker Innsbruck in January 2020.

=== Wolfsberger AC ===
In the summer of 2020, he returned to Austria, signing for Wolfsberger AC for an undisclosed fee.

=== WSG Tirol ===
On 10 August 2023, Taferner signed with WSG Tirol.

Having initially been released upon the expiry of his contract at the end of the 2025–26 season, Taferner resigned for Tirol on 31 August 2026.

== International career ==
On 24 April 2016, Taferner made his debut for Austria U15 in a 3–3 draw against their peers from Mexico at the Wörthersee Stadion in Klagenfurt. Further appearances followed on 26 April against Norway and on 29 April against Brazil. On 9 April 2017, he played in his Tyrolean homeland, in Jenbach, in the friendly international match against Turkey (1–3) for the Austrian U16 national team.

In the summer of 2017, he was selected by coach Rupert Marko for the Austria U17 team for the international Toto Cup. On 30 August 2017, he scored his first international goal in Sillian in the 79th minute of the match, putting the finishing touches to a 4–0 victory in the friendly against peers from Finland. In total, Taferner played five games for the U17 team.

In March 2021, Taferner made his international debut for the Austria U21 team against Saudi Arabia.

== Honours ==
Wacker Innsbruck

- Austrian Football First League: 2017–18
