= Lavanttal-Arena =

Football stadium in Wolfsberg, Austria

Coordinates: 46°49′35″N 14°51′7″E

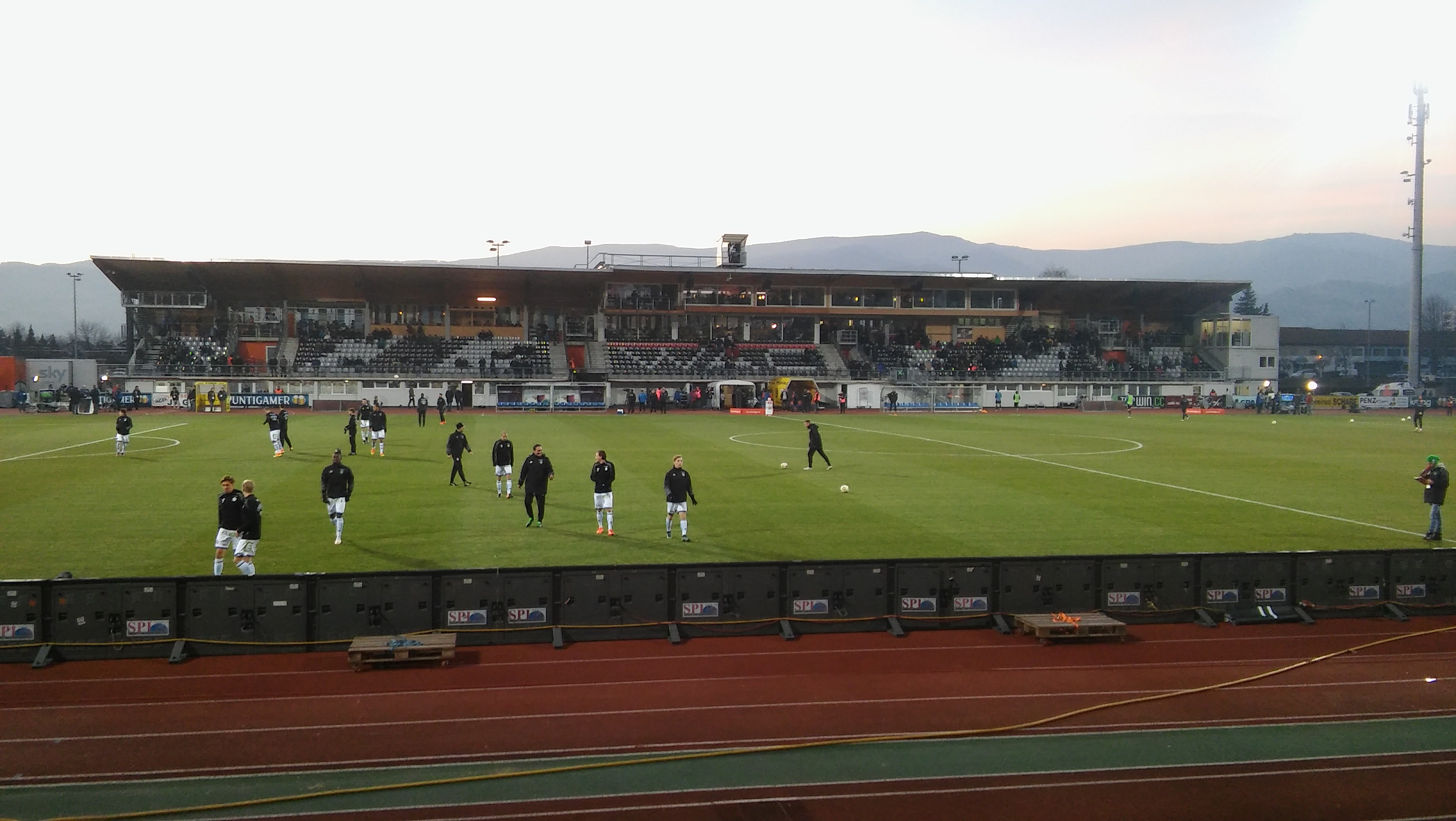
- Inside the stadium
- Interactive map of Lavanttal-Arena
- Former names: Sportstadion Wolfsberg
- Location: Wolfsberg, Austria
- Capacity: 7,300
- Surface: Natural grass
- Field size: 105 by 68 metres (114.8 yd × 74.4 yd)

Construction
- Opened: 1984
- Expanded: 2012

Tenant
- Wolfsberger AC

Lavanttal-Arena is an association football stadium in Wolfsberg, Carinthia, Austria, which is the home of Wolfsberger AC. The stadium is able to hold 7,300 spectators, and was built in 1984. Formerly the stadium was known as Sportstadion Wolfsberg.

== History ==
The stadium was built in 1984. After completion of the grandstand, the stadium was opened with the Olympic qualifier game between Austria and Finland on 31 May 1988, which ended in a 2–0 loss to the hosts after goals from Seppo Nikkilä and Ismo Lius.

In 2012, the stadium was expanded after Wolfsberger AC had reached the Austrian Football Bundesliga, adding the seating capacity from 6,500 to 7,300. The total costs for the expansion amounted to €2.5 million.

It is located approximately one kilometer south of the city Wolfsberg.

== Other uses ==
Wolfsberger AC use this stadium for their home games.
