= 2021–22 FC Red Bull Salzburg season =

Red Bull Salzburg
2021–22 season
- Owner: Red Bull GmbH
- Chairman: Harald Lürzer
- Head coach: Matthias Jaissle
- Stadium: Stadion Wals-Siezenheim
- Bundesliga: 1st
- Austrian Cup: Winners
- UEFA Champions League: Round of 16
- Top goalscorer: League: Karim Adeyemi (19); All: Karim Adeyemi (23)
Home colours	Away colours	Third colours

The 2021–22 season was the 89th season in the existence of the FC Red Bull Salzburg, and the club's 33rd consecutive season in the top flight of the Austrian football. In addition to the domestic league, Salzburg participated in this season's editions of the Austrian Cup and the UEFA Champions League.

== Players ==
=== First-team squad ===
As of 1 January 2022

Note: Flags indicate national team as defined under FIFA eligibility rules; some limited exceptions apply. Players may hold more than one non-FIFA nationality.

No.	Pos.	Nation	Player
1	GK	GER	Nico Mantl
3	DF	SUI	Bryan Okoh
4	DF	POL	Kamil Piątkowski
5	DF	AUT	Albert Vallçi
6	DF	CMR	Jérôme Onguéné
7	MF	ARG	Nicolás Capaldo
9	FW	AUT	Junior Adamu
10	MF	FRA	Antoine Bernède
11	MF	USA	Brenden Aaronson
13	MF	AUT	Nicolas Seiwald
14	MF	DEN	Maurits Kjaergaard
15	MF	MLI	Mamady Diambou
16	MF	AUT	Zlatko Junuzović (vice-captain)
17	DF	AUT	Andreas Ulmer (captain)
18	GK	SUI	Philipp Köhn

No.	Pos.	Nation	Player
19	MF	MLI	Mohamed Camara
20	FW	MLI	Sékou Koïta
21	MF	CRO	Luka Sučić
22	DF	FRA	Oumar Solet
27	FW	GER	Karim Adeyemi
29	DF	GER	Kilian Ludewig
30	FW	SLO	Benjamin Šeško
33	GK	GER	Alexander Walke
37	DF	MLI	Daouda Guindo
39	DF	AUT	Maximilian Wöber
43	DF	DEN	Rasmus Kristensen
77	FW	SUI	Noah Okafor
95	DF	BRA	Bernardo
—	MF	MLI	Youba Diarra
—	MF	NGR	Samson Tijani

=== Out on loan ===
As of 1 January 2022

Note: Flags indicate national team as defined under FIFA eligibility rules; some limited exceptions apply. Players may hold more than one non-FIFA nationality.

No.	Pos.	Nation	Player
—	DF	SUI	Jasper van der Werff (at (Germany) SC Paderborn until 30 June 2022)
—	DF	BIH	Darko Todorović (at (Russia) Akhmat Grozny until 30 June 2022)
—	DF	BIH	Amar Dedić (at (Austria) Wolfsberger AC until 30 June 2022)
—	MF	MLI	Ousmane Diakité (at (Switzerland) St. Gallen until 30 June 2022)

No.	Pos.	Nation	Player
—	MF	MLI	Mamadou Sangare (at (Austria) Grazer AK until 30 June 2022)
—	MF	GHA	Gideon Mensah (at (France) Bordeaux until 30 June 2022)
—	FW	BRA	Luis Phelipe (at (Switzerland) Lugano until 30 June 2022)

== Transfers ==
=== In ===
Date	Position	Nationality	Player	From	Fee	Ref.
1 July 2021	MF	(Argentina)	Nicolás Capaldo	(Argentina) Boca Juniors	€4,500,000	
1 July 2021	DF	(Poland)	Kamil Piątkowski	(Poland) Raków Częstochowa	€5,000,000	
2 July 2021	MF	(Brazil)	Bernardo	(England) Brighton & Hove Albion	Undisclosed	
17 July 2021	FW	(Croatia)	Roko Šimić	(Croatia) Lokomotiva Zagreb	€4,000,000	
12 January 2022	MF	(Ivory Coast)	Oumar Diakité	(Ivory Coast) ASEC Mimosas	Undisclosed	
31 January 2022	DF	(Belgium)	Ignace Van Der Brempt	(Belgium) Club Brugge	€5,000,000	
7 February 2022	MF	(Ghana)	Lawrence Agyekum	(Ghana) WAFA SC	Undisclosed	

=== Loans in ===
Start date	Position	Nationality	Player	From	End date	Ref.

=== Out ===
Date	Position	Nationality	Player	To	Fee	Ref.
1 July 2021	DF	(Austria)	David Affengruber	Sturm Graz	Undisclosed	
1 July 2021	MF	(Ghana)	Majeed Ashimeru	(Belgium) Anderlecht	€1,500,000	
1 July 2021	FW	(Zambia)	Patson Daka	(England) Leicester City	€30,000,000	
1 July 2021	DF	(Austria)	Patrick Farkas	(Switzerland) Luzern	Undisclosed	
1 July 2021	MF	(Japan)	Masaya Okugawa	(Germany) Arminia Bielefeld	€1,000,000	
1 July 2021	MF	(Slovakia)	Peter Pokorný	(Spain) Real Sociedad	€2,000,000	
1 July 2021	DF	(Brazil)	André Ramalho	(Netherlands) PSV Eindhoven	€2,500,000	
1 July 2021	GK	(Austria)	Cican Stanković	(Greece) AEK Athens	€1,150,000	
6 July 2021	MF	(Zambia)	Enock Mwepu	(England) Brighton & Hove Albion	€23,000,000	
10 July 2021	FW	(Ghana)	Samuel Tetteh	(Turkey) Adanaspor	Undisclosed	
2 September 2021	FW	(Germany)	Mërgim Berisha	(Turkey) Fenerbahçe	€5,000,000	
1 January 2022	GK	(Brazil)	Carlos Miguel Coronel	(United States) New York Red Bulls	Undisclosed	

=== Loans out ===
Start date	Position	Nationality	Player	To	End date	Ref.
1 July 2021	DF	(Bosnia and Herzegovina)	Amar Dedić	Wolfsberger AC	End of season	
1 July 2021	MF	(Mali)	Ousmane Diakité	(Switzerland) St. Gallen	4 January 2022	
1 July 2021	DF	(Colombia)	Lucho	FC Liefering	End of season	
1 July 2021	MF	(Ghana)	Daniel Owusu	FC Liefering	End of season	
1 July 2021	MF	(Mali)	Mamadou Sangare	Grazer AK	End of season	
1 July 2021	MF	(Nigeria)	Samson Tijani	FC Liefering	31 December 2021	
1 July 2021	DF	(Switzerland)	Jasper van der Werff	(Germany) SC Paderborn	End of season	
17 July 2021	FW	(Croatia)	Roko Šimić	FC Liefering	End of season	
28 July 2021	FW	(Brazil)	Luis Phelipe	(Switzerland) FC Lugano	8 February 2022	
3 August 2021	DF	(Ghana)	Gideon Mensah	(France) Bordeaux	End of season	
3 September 2021	DF	(Bosnia and Herzegovina)	Darko Todorović	(Russia) Akhmat Grozny	End of season	
8 January 2022	MF	(Mali)	Youba Diarra	TSV Hartberg	End of season	
13 January 2022	MF	(Ivory Coast)	Oumar Diakité	FC Liefering	End of season	
13 January 2022	DF	(Germany)	Kilian Ludewig	(Netherlands) Willem II	End of season	
27 January 2022	MF	(Mali)	Dorgeles Nene	SV Ried	End of season	
8 February 2022	MF	(Ghana)	Lawrence Agyekum	FC Liefering	End of season	

=== Released ===
Date	Position	Nationality	Player	Joined	Date	Ref.

== Pre-season and friendlies ==
Win Draw Loss Fixtures

25 June 2021 Friendly	Red Bull Salzburg	3–1	DAC Dunajská Streda	Wals-Siezenheim, Austria
18:00 CEST (UTC+2)	Okafor 11'; Nene 60'; Mwepu 64'	Report	Divković 38'	Stadium: Red Bull Arena; Referee: Florian Jäger

29 June 2021 Friendly	Red Bull Salzburg	3–0	Olympiacos	Wals-Siezenheim, Austria
18:00 CEST (UTC+2)	Junuzović 33'; Capaldo 35'; Adeyemi 67'	Report		Stadium: Red Bull Arena; Referee: Walter Altmann

3 July 2021 Friendly	Red Bull Salzburg	1–3	Monaco	Bramberg am Wildkogel, Austria
16:30 CEST (UTC+2)	Aaronson 6'	Report	Millot 44'; Diop 65'; Musaba 90+2'	Referee: Christopher Jäger

10 July 2021 Friendly	Red Bull Salzburg	2–2	Raków Częstochowa	Bramberg am Wildkogel, Austria
15:00 CEST (UTC+2)	Adeyemi 48'; Ludewig 65'	Report	Sapała 4' (pen.); Musiolik 30'	Referee: Samuel Sampl
Note: The match was played in two halves of 45 minutes and one half of 30 minutes.

28 July 2021 Friendly	Red Bull Salzburg	1–0	Atlético Madrid	Wals-Siezenheim, Austria
19:45 CEST (UTC+2)	Adeyemi 34'	Report	Camus (yellow card) 23'; Saúl (yellow card) 35'	Stadium: Red Bull Arena; Attendance: 20,000

4 August 2021 Friendly	Red Bull Salzburg	2–1	Barcelona	Wals-Siezenheim, Austria
19:00 CEST (UTC+2)	Camara (yellow card) 27'; Sučić 43'; Bernède (yellow card) 48'; Aaronson 90'	Report	Braithwaite 83'	Stadium: Red Bull Arena; Referee: Rene Eisner

14 January 2022 Friendly	Red Bull Salzburg	6–0	Amstetten	Salzburg, Austria
15:00 CET (UTC+1)	Šeško 49', 50', 54', 58'; Kjaergaard 70'; Capaldo 85'			Stadium: Red Bull Trainingszentrum

18 January 2022 Friendly	Red Bull Salzburg	3–1	Ried	Salzburg, Austria
15:00 CET (UTC+1)	Šeško 15'; Adeyemi 46'; Solet 76'	Report	Stošić 16'	Stadium: Sportanlage Taxham; Referee: Sebastian Gishamer

22 January 2022 Friendly	Red Bull Salzburg	1–2	Admira Wacker Mödling	Salzburg, Austria
15:00 CET (UTC+1)	Guindo (yellow card) 89'; Šeško 102'; Bernède (yellow card) 112'	Report	Mustapha (yellow card) 34'; Ebner (yellow card) 39'; Nikolov 72'; Starkl 94'	Stadium: Red Bull Trainingszentrum; Referee: Christopher Jäger
Note: The match was played in two halves of 45 minutes and one half of 30 minutes.

29 January 2022 Friendly	Red Bull Salzburg	Cancelled	WSG Tirol	Salzburg, Austria
14:00 CET (UTC+1)				Stadium: Sportanlage Taxham

29 January 2022 Friendly	Red Bull Salzburg	3–0	SV Lafnitz	Wals-Siezenheim, Austria
11:00 CET (UTC+1)	Šeško 9'; Solet 43'; Piątkowski 90'	Report		Stadium: Red Bull Arena

== Competitions ==
=== Overall record ===
Competition	First match	Last match	Starting round	Final position	Record							
Competition	First match	Last match	Starting round	Final position	Pld	W	D	L	GF	GA	GD	Win %
Bundesliga	23 July 2021	21 May 2022	Matchday 1	Winners	32	25	5	2	77	19	+58	78.13
Austrian Cup	16 July 2021	1 May 2022	First round	Winners	6	5	1	0	22	3	+19	83.33
Champions League	17 August 2021	8 March 2022	Play-off round	Round of 16	10	5	2	3	14	16	−2	50.00
Total					48	35	8	5	113	38	+75	72.92

Last updated: 21 May 2022
Source: Soccerway

=== Bundesliga ===
==== League table ====
Austrian Bundesliga regular season table
Pos	Team	Pld	W	D	L	GF	GA	GD	Pts	Qualification
1	Red Bull Salzburg	22	17	4	1	50	13	+37	55	Qualification for the Championship round
2	Sturm Graz	22	10	7	5	46	32	+14	37	Qualification for the Championship round
3	Wolfsberger AC	22	11	4	7	34	32	+2	37	Qualification for the Championship round
4	Austria Wien	22	8	9	5	31	23	+8	33	Qualification for the Championship round
5	Rapid Wien	22	8	7	7	35	31	+4	31	Qualification for the Championship round

Source: Austrian Football Bundesliga
Rules for classification: 1) Points; 2) Head-to-head record; 3) Goal difference; 4) Goals scored; 5) Matches won; 6) Away matches won; 7) Away goals scored.

==== Results summary ====
Overall								Home						Away					
Pld	W	D	L	GF	GA	GD	Pts	W	D	L	GF	GA	GD	W	D	L	GF	GA	GD
22	17	4	1	50	13	+37	55	10	1	0	33	5	+28	7	3	1	17	8	+9

Last updated: 5 March 2022.
Source: Austrian Football Bundesliga

==== Results by round ====
Round	1	2	3	4	5	6	7	8	9	10	11	12	13	14	15	16	17	18	19	20	21	22
Ground	A	H	H	A	H	A	A	H	A	H	A	H	A	A	H	A	H	H	A	H	A	H
Result	W	W	W	W	W	W	W	W	W	W	D	W	D	W	D	L	W	W	W	W	D	W
Position	1	1	1	1	1	1	1	1	1	1	1	1	1	1	1	1	1	1	1	1	1	1

Updated to match(es) played on 5 March 2022. Source: Austrian Football Bundesliga
A = Away; H = Home; W = Win; D = Draw; L = Loss

==== Matches ====
The league fixtures were announced on 22 June 2021.

23 July 2021 1	Sturm Graz	1–3	Red Bull Salzburg	Graz
20:30 CEST (UTC+2)	Ulmer 11' (o.g.); Prass (yellow card) 71'	Report	Capaldo (yellow card) 45+1'; Adeyemi 69', 85'; Kristensen 76'; Seiwald (yellow card) 81'	Stadium: Merkur-Arena; Attendance: 13,088; Referee: Walter Altmann

1 August 2021 2	Red Bull Salzburg	7–1	Ried	Wals-Siezenheim
17:00 CEST (UTC+2)	Šeško (yellow card) 13', (goal) 37', 90+1'; Kristensen 41'; Adeyemi 52', 62'; Seiwald (yellow card) 72'; Ulmer 78'; Wöber (yellow card) 82'; Okafor 90+3'	Report	Pomer 89'	Stadium: Stadion Wals-Siezenheim; Attendance: 11,998; Referee: Markus Hameter

8 August 2021 3	Red Bull Salzburg	1–0	Austria Wien	Wals-Siezenheim
17:00 CEST (UTC+2)	Wöber (yellow card) 19'; Camara (yellow card) 48'; Adeyemi 71'; Ulmer (yellow card) 90+6'	Report	Pichler (yellow card) 84'; Martel (yellow card) 87'; Handl (yellow card) 90+2'	Stadium: Stadion Wals-Siezenheim; Attendance: 13,520; Referee: Andreas Heiß

14 August 2021 4	Admira Wacker Mödling	0–1	Red Bull Salzburg	Maria Enzersdorf
17:00 CEST (UTC+2)	Mustapha (yellow card) 28'; Leitner (yellow card) 68'	Report	Capaldo (yellow card) 68'; Adamu (yellow card) 68', (goal) 81'; Bernède (yellow card) 72'; Wöber (yellow card) 90+1'	Stadium: BSFZ-Arena; Attendance: 3,049; Referee: Harald Lechner

21 August 2021 5	Red Bull Salzburg	3–1	Austria Klagenfurt	Wals-Siezenheim
17:00 CEST (UTC+2)	Adeyemi 3'; Capaldo (yellow card) 47'; Berisha 70'; Kristensen 84'	Report	Andersson 14'; Gemicibasi (yellow card) 18'; Mahrer (yellow card) 52'; Pink (yellow card) 69'; Wimmer (yellow card) 73'	Stadium: Stadion Wals-Siezenheim; Attendance: 11,826; Referee: Julian Weinberger

28 August 2021 6	Hartberg	0–1	Red Bull Salzburg	Hartberg
17:00 CEST (UTC+2)	Sonnleitner (yellow card) 31'; Stec (yellow card) 63'	Report	Capaldo 44'	Stadium: Profertil Arena Hartberg; Attendance: 2,529; Referee: Stefan Ebner

11 September 2021 7	WSG Tirol	1–3	Red Bull Salzburg	Innsbruck
17:00 CEST (UTC+2)	Blume 54'; Rogelj (yellow card) 66'; Klassen (yellow card) 66'; Skrbo (yellow card) 90+2'	Report	Adamu 28'; Adeyemi (yellow card) 66'; Okafor 83'; Šeško 88'	Stadium: Tivoli Stadion Tirol; Attendance: 2,439; Referee: Gerhard Grobelnik

19 September 2021 8	Red Bull Salzburg	2–0	Rapid Wien	Wals-Siezenheim
17:00 CEST (UTC+2)	Onguéné (yellow card) 36'; Adeyemi 79' (pen.); Aaronson 90+4'	Report	Aiwu (yellow card) 45+2'; Wimmer (yellow card) 78'; Grüll (yellow card) 79'	Stadium: Stadion Wals-Siezenheim; Attendance: 17,218; Referee: Markus Hameter

25 September 2021 9	Wolfsberger AC	0–2	Red Bull Salzburg	Wolfsberg
17:00 CEST (UTC+2)	Gugganig (yellow card) 41' (yellow-red card) 44'	Report	Onguéné 15'; Okafor 51'; Bernardo (yellow card) 56'; Camara (yellow card) 90'	Stadium: Lavanttal-Arena; Attendance: 3,023; Referee: Josef Spurny

3 October 2021 10	Red Bull Salzburg	3–1	LASK	Wals-Siezenheim
17:00 CEST (UTC+2)	Capaldo 19'; Bernardo (yellow card) 26'; Wöber 45+2'; Adeyemi 58'	Report	Filipović (yellow card) 43'; Flecker (yellow card) 68'; Luckeneder (yellow card) 89'; Monschein 90+2'	Stadium: Stadion Wals-Siezenheim; Attendance: 12,093; Referee: Harald Lechner

16 October 2021 11	Rheindorf Altach	1–1	Red Bull Salzburg	Altach
17:00 CEST (UTC+2)	Zwischenbrugger 14'; Strauss (yellow card) 82'	Report	Okafor 9'; Camara (yellow card) 31'	Stadium: Stadion Schnabelholz; Attendance: 4,720; Referee: Walter Altmann

24 October 2021 12	Red Bull Salzburg	4–1	Sturm Graz	Wals-Siezenheim
17:00 CEST (UTC+2)	Kristensen 5'; Adeyemi 22', 81', (yellow card) 28'; Ulmer (yellow card) 57'; Siebenhandl 74' (o.g.)	Report	Jantscher 50'; Gazibegović (yellow card) 88'	Stadium: Stadion Wals-Siezenheim; Attendance: 16,512; Referee: Manuel Schüttengruber

30 October 2021 13	Ried	2–2	Red Bull Salzburg	Ried im Innkreis
17:00 CEST (UTC+2)	Meisl 9'; Seiwald (yellow card) 65'; Pomer (yellow card) 69'; Şahin-Radlinger (yellow card) 70'; Mikić 90+3'	Report	Capaldo (yellow card) 16'; Ulmer (yellow card) 52'; Kristensen (penalty missed) 72'; Adamu 83'; Okafor 85'; Onguéné (yellow card) 87'; Wöber (yellow card) 90+3'; Seiwald (yellow card) 90+5'	Stadium: Keine Sorgen Arena; Referee: Julian Weinberger

6 November 2021 14	Austria Wien	0–1	Red Bull Salzburg	Vienna
17:00 CET (UTC+1)	Huskovic (yellow card) 40'; Braunöder (yellow card) 45+3'; El Sheiwi (yellow card) 61'	Report	Ulmer (yellow card) 6'; Camara (yellow card) 13'; Capaldo (yellow card) 35'; Okafor (yellow card) 45+3'; Adeyemi 65'	Stadium: Generali Arena; Attendance: 9,713; Referee: Andreas Heiß

20 November 2021 15	Red Bull Salzburg	0–0	Admira Wacker Mödling	Wals-Siezenheim
17:00 CET (UTC+1)		Report	Kronberger (yellow card) 50'; Vorsager (yellow card) 62'; Schmiedl (yellow card) 82'; Lukačević (yellow card) 90+2'	Stadium: Stadion Wals-Siezenheim; Attendance: 0 Referee: Josef Spurny

27 November 2021 16	Austria Klagenfurt	2–1	Red Bull Salzburg	Klagenfurt
17:00 CET (UTC+1)	Gemicibaşi 30', (yellow card) 36'; Schumacher (yellow card) 58'; Pink 80'; Paul (yellow card) 90+5'	Report	Camara (yellow card) 89'; Kristensen 90+1'	Stadium: Wörthersee Stadion; Attendance: 0 Referee: Gerhard Grobelnik

4 December 2021 17	Red Bull Salzburg	2–1	Hartberg	Wals-Siezenheim
17:00 CET (UTC+1)	Kristensen 79'; Adeyemi (yellow card) 79'; Onguéné 86'	Report	Niemann 10'; Horvat (yellow card) 19'; Avdijaj (yellow card) 66'; Swete (yellow card) 79'	Stadium: Stadion Wals-Siezenheim; Attendance: 0 Referee: Dieter Muckenhammer

11 December 2021 18	Red Bull Salzburg	5–0	WSG Tirol	Wals-Siezenheim
17:00 CET (UTC+1)	Capaldo 30'; Adeyemi 49', 80', 83'; Okafor 85'	Report		Stadium: Stadion Wals-Siezenheim; Attendance: 0 Referee: Alan Kijas

11 February 2022 19	Rapid Wien	1–2	Red Bull Salzburg	Vienna
17:00 CET (UTC+1)	Stojković 18'; Schick (yellow card) 90+4'	Report	Wöber (yellow card) 52'; Aaronson 64'; Bernède (yellow card) 65'; Camara (yellow card) 68'; Okafor 77'	Stadium: Allianz Stadion; Attendance: 2,000; Referee: Manuel Schüttengruber

20 February 2022 20	Red Bull Salzburg	2–0	Wolfsberger AC	Wals-Siezenheim
14:30 CET (UTC+1)	Sučić 90+3'; Aaronson 90+4'	Report	Lochoshvili (yellow card) 22'; Taferner (yellow card) 31'; Novak (yellow card) 70'	Stadium: Stadion Wals-Siezenheim; Attendance: 9,017; Referee: Rene Eisner

2 March 2022 21	LASK	0–0	Red Bull Salzburg	Pasching
20:30 CET (UTC+1)	Flecker (yellow card) 44'; Renner (yellow card) 45+1' (yellow-red card) 50'	Report	Kjaergaard (yellow card) 83'; Capaldo (yellow card) 90+2'; Tijani (yellow card) 90+5'	Stadium: Raiffeisen Arena; Referee: Josef Spurny

5 March 2022 22	Red Bull Salzburg	4–0	Rheindorf Altach	Wals-Siezenheim
17:00 CET (UTC+1)	Adamu (penalty missed) 11', 12'; Wöber 23'; Sučić 27'; Adeyemi 90+1' (pen.)	Report	Haudum (yellow card) 30'; Netzer (yellow card) 90'	Stadium: Stadion Wals-Siezenheim; Attendance: 7,005; Referee: Alan Kijas

==== League table ====
Pos	Team	Pld	W	D	L	GF	GA	GD	Pts	Qualification
1	Red Bull Salzburg (C)	32	25	5	2	77	19	+58	52	Qualification for the Champions League group stage
2	Sturm Graz	32	16	8	8	62	46	+16	37	Qualification for the Champions League third qualifying round
3	Austria Wien	32	11	13	8	44	39	+5	29	Qualification for the Europa League play-off round
4	Wolfsberger AC	32	14	5	13	48	53	−5	28	Qualification for the Europa Conference League third qualifying round
5	Rapid Wien (O)	32	10	11	11	48	45	+3	25	Qualification for the Europa Conference League play-offs

Rules for classification: 1) Points; 2) Points with (possible) half points subtracted due to rounding; 3) Head-to-head points; 4) Head-to-head goal difference; 5) Head-to-head goals scored; 6) Head-to-head away goals scored; 7) Goal difference; 8) Goals scored; 9) Matches won; 10) Away matches won; 11) Away goals scored.
(C) Champions; (O) Play-off winners

==== Results summary ====
Overall								Home						Away					
Pld	W	D	L	GF	GA	GD	Pts	W	D	L	GF	GA	GD	W	D	L	GF	GA	GD
32	25	5	2	77	19	+58	80	14	2	0	46	7	+39	11	3	2	31	12	+19

Last updated: 21 May 2022.
Source: Austrian Football Bundesliga

==== Results by round ====
Round	1	2	3	4	5	6	7	8	9	10
Ground	H	A	H	A	A	H	A	H	A	H
Result	W	W	W	W	W	W	L	W	W	D
Position	1	1	1	1	1	1	1	1	1	1

Updated to match(es) played on 21 May 2022. Source: Austrian Football Bundesliga
A = Away; H = Home; W = Win; D = Draw; L = Loss

==== Matches ====
13 March 2022 23	Red Bull Salzburg	1–0	Sturm Graz	Wals-Siezenheim
17:00 CET (UTC+1)	Wöber 55'	Report	Dante (yellow card) 62'	Stadium: Stadion Wals-Siezenheim; Attendance: 8,945; Referee: Dieter Muckenhammer

20 March 2022 24	Wolfsberger AC	1–4	Red Bull Salzburg	Wolfsberg
14:30 CET (UTC+1)	Peretz 87'	Report	Wöber (yellow card) 5'; Okafor 15'; Adamu 27'; Kristensen 36'; Kjærgaard 68'	Stadium: Lavanttal-Arena; Attendance: 3,626; Referee: Alan Kijas

3 April 2022 25	Red Bull Salzburg	2–1	Rapid Wien	Wals-Siezenheim
17:00 CEST (UTC+2)	Camara (yellow card) 16'; Sučić 17'; Capaldo (yellow card) 37'; Šeško (yellow card) 80'; Kristensen (yellow card) 80'; Adeyemi (yellow card) 87'; Junuzović 90+4'	Report	Druijf 52'; Wimmer (yellow card) 90+1'; Grüll (yellow card) 90+2'	Stadium: Stadion Wals-Siezenheim; Attendance: 15,217; Referee: Alexander Harkam

10 April 2022 26	Austria Klagenfurt	0–6	Red Bull Salzburg	Klagenfurt
14:30 CEST (UTC+2)	Gemicibaşi (red card) 30'; Šaravanja (yellow card) 30'; Greil (yellow card) 67'	Report	Sučić 42', 55', (yellow card) 84'; Wöber 68'; Kjærgaard 70'; Adeyemi 79' (pen.); Šeško 81'	Stadium: Wörthersee Stadion; Attendance: 4,463; Referee: Harald Lechner

17 April 2022 27	Austria Wien	1–2	Red Bull Salzburg	Vienna
14:30 CEST (UTC+2)	Jukic 65' (pen.); Braunöder (yellow card) 90+5'	Report	Camara (yellow card) 43'; Adamu 52'; Sučić 78'	Stadium: Generali Arena; Attendance: 9,339; Referee: Christian-Petru Ciochirca

24 April 2022 28	Red Bull Salzburg	5–0	Austria Wien	Wals-Siezenheim
14:30 CEST (UTC+2)	Okafor 3'; Adeyemi 18'; Sučić 28'; Aaronson 54' (pen.); Camara (yellow card) 60', (goal) 85' (pen.)	Report	Da Graça (yellow card) 18' (yellow-red card) 53'; Fitz (yellow card) 83'	Stadium: Stadion Wals-Siezenheim; Attendance: 15,496; Referee: Walter Altmann

27 April 2022 29	Sturm Graz	2–1	Red Bull Salzburg	Graz
18:30 CEST (UTC+2)	Jäger 14', (yellow card) 82'; Jantscher 72'	Report	Šeško 22'; Bernardo (yellow card) 57'; Wöber (yellow card) 76'	Stadium: Merkur-Arena; Attendance: 11,383; Referee: Manuel Schüttengruber

8 May 2022 30	Red Bull Salzburg	4–0	Wolfsberger AC	Wals-Siezenheim
14:30 CEST (UTC+2)	Adeyemi 2', 37'; Adamu 31'; Kristensen (penalty missed) 41'; Solet 84'	Report	Peretz (red card) 40'; Leitgeb (yellow card) 48'	Stadium: Stadion Wals-Siezenheim; Attendance: 8,007; Referee: Daniel Pfister

15 May 2022 31	Rapid Wien	0–1	Red Bull Salzburg	Vienna
17:00 CEST (UTC+2)	Aiwu (yellow card) 87'; Grüll (yellow card) 90+1'	Report	Sučić 10'; Van Der Brempt (yellow card) 27'; Aaronson (yellow card) 89'	Stadium: Allianz Stadion; Attendance: 23,014; Referee: Stefan Ebner

21 May 2022 32	Red Bull Salzburg	1–1	Austria Klagenfurt	Wals-Siezenheim
17:00 CEST (UTC+2)	Koïta 90+3', (yellow card) 90+4'	Report	Wimmer (yellow card) 37'; Gemicibaşi 48'	Stadium: Stadion Wals-Siezenheim; Referee: Alexander Harkam

=== Austrian Cup ===
16 July 2021 First round	WSC Hertha	1–4	Red Bull Salzburg	Wels
17:30 CEST (UTC+2)	Maier (yellow card) 24', (goal) 33'; Sulimani (yellow card) 59'	Report	Bernardo 14'; Šeško 52', 56'; Sučić 90'	Stadium: Mauth Stadion; Attendance: 2,200; Referee: Rene Eisner

22 September 2021 Second round	Red Bull Salzburg	8–0	SC Kalsdorf	Wals-Siezenheim
19:00 CEST (UTC+2)	Seiwald 10'; Kristensen 38' (pen.); Capaldo 40'; Okafor 44', 53'; Šeško 63'; Okoh 83'; Kjaergaard 90+1'	Report		Stadium: Stadion Wals-Siezenheim; Attendance: 2,300; Referee: Walter Altmann

27 October 2021 Third round	St. Pölten	0–3	Red Bull Salzburg	Sankt Pölten
19:00 CEST (UTC+2)	Salamon (yellow card) 16'; Barlov (yellow card) 36'; Kovačević (yellow card) 80'	Report	Guindo 30'; Diambou (yellow card) 59'; Adamu 73'; Kristensen 90+1'	Stadium: NV Arena; Attendance: 3,444; Referee: Christian-Petru Ciochirca

6 February 2022 Quarter-finals	Red Bull Salzburg	3–1	LASK	Wals-Siezenheim
16:30 CET (UTC+1)	Renner 15' (o.g.); Kristensen 41'; Capaldo 48'	Report	Horvath 13'	Stadium: Stadion Wals-Siezenheim; Attendance: 2,000; Referee: Walter Altmann

16 March 2022 Semi-finals	Wolfsberger AC	1–1 (a.e.t.) (4–5 p)	Red Bull Salzburg	Wolfsberg
18:00 CET (UTC+1)	Taferner 3', (yellow card) 120'; Peretz (yellow card) 63'; Veratschnig (yellow card) 90+4'	Report	Šeško 77', (red card) 117'; Kjærgaard (yellow card) 101'	Stadium: Lavanttal-Arena; Attendance: 4,380; Referee: Markus Hameter
	Penalties
	Leitgeb (penalty scored); Wernitznig (penalty missed); Peretz (penalty scored); Baumgartner (penalty scored); Liendl (penalty scored)		(penalty scored) Kristensen; (penalty scored) Okafor; (penalty scored) Kjærgaard; (penalty scored) Aaronson; (penalty scored) Solet

1 May 2022 Final	Red Bull Salzburg	3–0	Ried	Klagenfurt
17:00 CEST (UTC+2)	Sučić 27', (yellow card) 75'; Wöber 52'; Šeško 87'	Report	Bajic (yellow card) 75'	Stadium: Wörthersee Stadion; Attendance: 7,800; Referee: Alexander Harkam

=== UEFA Champions League ===
==== Play-off round ====
The draw for the play-off round was held on 2 August 2021.

17 August 2021 First leg	Red Bull Salzburg (Austria)	2–1	(Denmark) Brøndby	Wals-Siezenheim, Austria
21:00 CEST (UTC+2)	Adeyemi 57'; Aaronson 90'	Report	Uhre 4'; Frendrup (yellow card) 69'; Maxsø (yellow card) 84'	Stadium: Stadion Wals-Siezenheim; Attendance: 17,538; Referee: Szymon Marciniak (Poland)

25 August 2021 Second leg	Brøndby (Denmark)	1–2 (2–4 agg.)	(Austria) Red Bull Salzburg	Brøndbyvester, Denmark
21:00 CEST (UTC+2)	Maxsø 62', (yellow card) 88'	Report	Šeško 4'; Aaronson 10'; Camara (yellow card) 35'; Solet (yellow card) 45'	Stadium: Brøndby Stadium; Attendance: 22,397; Referee: Carlos del Cerro Grande (Spain)

==== Group stage ====
The draw for the group stage was held on 26 August 2021.

Pos	Team	Pld	W	D	L	GF	GA	GD	Pts	Qualification	LIL	SAL	SEV	WOL
1	(France) Lille	6	3	2	1	7	4	+3	11	Advance to knockout phase	—	1–0	0–0	0–0
2	(Austria) Red Bull Salzburg	6	3	1	2	8	6	+2	10	Advance to knockout phase	2–1	—	1–0	3–1
3	(Spain) Sevilla	6	1	3	2	5	5	0	6	Transfer to Europa League	1–2	1–1	—	2–0
4	(Germany) VfL Wolfsburg	6	1	2	3	5	10	−5	5		1–3	2–1	1–1	—

Source: UEFA
Rules for classification: Group stage tiebreakers

14 September 2021 1	Sevilla (Spain)	1–1	(Austria) Red Bull Salzburg	Seville, Spain
18:45 CEST (UTC+2)	Diego Carlos (yellow card) 13'; En-Nesyri (yellow card) 26' (yellow-red card) 50'; Rakitić 42' (pen.), (yellow card) 65'; Delaney (yellow card) 82'; Navas (yellow card) 84'	Report	Adeyemi (penalty missed) 13'; Seiwald (yellow card) 15'; Sučić 21' (pen.), (penalty missed) 37'; Capaldo (yellow card) 84'; Camara (yellow card) 90+3'; Okafor (yellow card) 90+4'	Stadium: Ramón Sánchez Pizjuán; Attendance: 18,373; Referee: Aleksei Kulbakov (Belarus)

29 September 2021 2	Red Bull Salzburg (Austria)	2–1	(France) Lille	Salzburg, Austria
21:00 CEST (UTC+2)	Adeyemi 35' (pen.), 53' (pen.), (yellow card) 54'; Capaldo (yellow card) 90+3'	Report	Botman (yellow card) 30'; Xeka (yellow card) 45+1'; Yılmaz (yellow card) 51', (goal) 62'; Fonte (yellow card) 66'; Bamba (yellow card) 89'	Stadium: Stadion Wals-Siezenheim; Attendance: 24,207; Referee: Halil Umut Meler (Turkey)

20 October 2021 3	Red Bull Salzburg (Austria)	3–1	(Germany) VfL Wolfsburg	Salzburg, Austria
18:45 CEST (UTC+2)	Adeyemi 3'; Camara (yellow card) 19'; Okafor 65', 77'; Capaldo (yellow card) 87'	Report	Nmecha 15'; Mbabu (yellow card) 47'; Arnold (yellow card) 84'	Stadium: Stadion Wals-Siezenheim; Attendance: 29,520; Referee: Daniele Orsato (Italy)

2 November 2021 4	VfL Wolfsburg (Germany)	2–1	(Austria) Red Bull Salzburg	Wolfsburg, Germany
18:45 CET (UTC+1)	Baku 3'; Weghorst (yellow card) 28'; Nmecha 60', (yellow card) 83'; Brooks (yellow card) 68'	Report	Wöber 30'; Ulmer (yellow card) 87'	Stadium: Volkswagen Arena; Attendance: 16,112; Referee: Artur Soares Dias (Portugal)

23 November 2021 5	Lille (France)	1–0	(Austria) Red Bull Salzburg	Villeneuve-d'Ascq, France
21:00 CET (UTC+1)	Djaló (yellow card) 14'; David 31'; Xeka (yellow card) 67'; Bamba (yellow card) 90+5'	Report	Kristensen (yellow card) 8'; Seiwald (yellow card) 35'; Kjaergaard (yellow card) 90'; Adeyemi (yellow card) 90+6'	Stadium: Stade Pierre-Mauroy; Attendance: 33,573; Referee: Anthony Taylor (England)

8 December 2021 6	Red Bull Salzburg (Austria)	1–0	(Spain) Sevilla	Wals-Siezenheim, Austria
21:00 CEST (UTC+2)	Onguéné (yellow card) 37'; Okafor 50'; Ulmer (yellow card) 69'	Report	Augustinsson (yellow card) 18'; Jordán (yellow card) 56' (yellow-red card) 64'; Ocampos (yellow card) 81'	Stadium: Stadion Wals-Siezenheim; Attendance: 0 Referee: Slavko Vinčić (Slovenia)

==== Knockout phase ====
===== Round of 16 =====
The draw for the round of 16 was held on 13 December 2021.

16 February 2022 First leg	Red Bull Salzburg (Austria)	1–1	(Germany) Bayern Munich	Wals-Siezenheim, Austria
21:00 CET (UTC+1)	Adamu 21'; Köhn (yellow card) 86'	Report	Coman (yellow card) 83', (goal) 90'; Sabitzer (yellow card) 90+2'	Stadium: Stadion Wals-Siezenheim; Attendance: 29,520; Referee: Michael Oliver (England)

8 March 2022 Second leg	Bayern Munich (Germany)	7–1 (8–2 agg.)	(Austria) Red Bull Salzburg	Munich, Germany
21:00 CET (UTC+1)	Lewandowski 12' (pen.), 21' (pen.), 23'; Gnabry 31'; Müller 54', 83'; Sané 86'	Report	Kjaergaard 70'	Stadium: Allianz Arena; Attendance: 25,000; Referee: Clément Turpin (France)
