= 2019–20 FC Red Bull Salzburg season =

Red Bull Salzburg
2019–20 season
- Chairman: Georgios Esplandatkoulos
- Manager: Jesse Marsch
- Stadium: Red Bull Arena
- Bundesliga: 1st
- Austrian Cup: Winners
- UEFA Champions League: Group stage
- UEFA Europa League: Round of 32
- Top goalscorer: League: Patson Daka (24); All: Erling Haaland (28)
Home colours	Away colours	Third colours

The 2019–20 FC Red Bull Salzburg season was the 87th season in club history, in which Red Bull Salzburg successfully defended their League and Cup titles from the previous season.

== Season events ==
On 6 June, Jesse Marsch was announced as Red Bull Salzburg's new manager.

In June, Gideon Mensah signed a new contract with Red Bull Salzburg, keeping him at the club until 31 May 2024, with Majeed Ashimeru also signing a five-year contract later in the month.

On 13 August, Diadie Samassékou left Red Bull Salzburg to join TSG 1899 Hoffenheim, and Maximilian Wöber joined on a five-year contract from Sevilla.

On 29 August, Mahamadou Dembélé left Red Bull Salzburg to sign a permanent deal with Troyes.

On 30 August, Gideon Mensah moved to Zulte Waregem on loan for the season, Youba Diarra signed a new contract until May 2024 and joined St. Pauli on loan for the season.

On 18 December, Red Bull Salzburg extended their contracts with Enock Mwepu, Sékou Koïta and Patson Daka until the summer of 2024.

On 19 December, Red Bull Salzburg and Liverpool agreed the transfer of Takumi Minamino to Liverpool, to be finalised on 1 January 2020.

On 29 December, Red Bull Salzburg announced that Erling Haaland had agreed to join Borussia Dortmund, with the deal being finalised on 3 January 2020.

On 6 January, Mërgim Berisha returned early from his loan deal with SCR Altach, whilst Anderson Niangbo returned from his loan deal with Wolfsberger AC on 7 January.

On 9 January, Kilian Ludewig moved to Barnsley on loan for the rest of the season, whilst Jasper van der Werff joined Basel on an 18-month long loan deal and extended his contract with Red Bull Salzburg until 31 May 2023.

On 15 January Anderson Niangbo, moved permanently to Gent, and Marin Pongračić joined VfL Wolfsburg permanently.

On 19 January, Karim Adeyemi extended his contract with Red Bull Salzburg until the summer of 2024.

On 29 January, Youba Diarra returned to Red Bull Salzburg from his loan deal at St. Pauli due to a knee injury.

On 31 January, Smail Prevljak left Red Bull Salzburg to join K.A.S. Eupen on loan for the remainder of the season, and Noah Okafor signed for Red Bull Salzburg on a contract until the summer of 2024.

On 10 March, all Bundesliga games were postponed due to the COVID-19 pandemic.

On 13 May, the Bundesliga announced the resumption of games starting on 1 June.

== Squad ==
As of match played 5 July 2020

No.	Name	Nationality	Position	Date of birth (age)	Signed from	Signed in	Contract ends	Apps.	Goals
Goalkeepers
1	Cican Stankovic	(Austria)	GK	4 November 1992 (aged 27)	SV Grödig	2015		106	0
23	Philipp Köhn	(Switzerland)	GK	2 April 1998 (aged 22)	RB Leipzig	2019		0	0
31	Carlos Miguel Coronel	(Brazil)	GK	29 December 1996 (aged 23)	Academy	2017		10	0
33	Alexander Walke	(Germany)	GK	6 June 1983 (aged 37)	Hansa Rostock	2010	2020	229	0
Defenders
5	Albert Vallci	(Austria)	DF	2 July 1995 (aged 25)	Wacker Innsbruck	2019		35	3
6	Jérôme Onguéné	(Cameroon)	DF	22 December 1997 (aged 22)	VfB Stuttgart	2018		77	10
15	André Ramalho	(Brazil)	DF	16 February 1992 (aged 28)	Bayer 04 Leverkusen	2018		197	18
17	Andreas Ulmer	(Austria)	DF	30 December 1985 (aged 34)	SV Ried	2008		448	22
25	Patrick Farkas	(Austria)	DF	9 September 1992 (aged 27)	SV Mattersburg	2017		49	5
39	Maximilian Wöber	(Austria)	DF	4 February 1998 (aged 22)	Sevilla	2019	2024	35	0
43	Rasmus Kristensen	(Denmark)	DF	29 December 1996 (aged 23)	Jong Ajax	2019	2024	20	0
Midfielders
4	Majeed Ashimeru	(Ghana)	MF	10 October 1997 (aged 22)	West African Football Academy	2017	2024	29	3
14	Dominik Szoboszlai	(Hungary)	MF	25 October 2000 (aged 19)	Academy	2017		61	17
16	Zlatko Junuzović	(Austria)	MF	26 September 1987 (aged 32)	Werder Bremen	2018		68	10
19	Mohamed Camara	(Mali)	MF	6 January 2000 (aged 20)	Real Bamako	2018		16	1
27	Karim Adeyemi	(Germany)	MF	18 January 2002 (aged 18)	SpVgg Unterhaching	2018	2022	12	1
28	Antoine Bernède	(France)	MF	26 May 1999 (aged 21)	Paris Saint-Germain	2019		18	0
37	Masaya Okugawa	(Japan)	MF	14 April 1996 (aged 24)	Kyoto Sanga	2015		33	11
44	Youba Diarra	(Mali)	MF	7 September 1998 (aged 21)	Yeelen Olympique	2018		0	0
45	Enock Mwepu	(Zambia)	MF	1 January 1998 (aged 22)	Kafue Celtic	2017	2024	75	7
Forwards
7	Sékou Koïta	(Mali)	ST	28 November 1999 (aged 20)	USC Kita	2018	2024	23	10
8	Mërgim Berisha	(Germany)	ST	11 May 1998 (aged 22)	Academy	2014		10	1
9	Hwang Hee-chan	(South Korea)	ST	26 January 1996 (aged 24)	Pohang Steelers	2015		126	46
20	Patson Daka	(Zambia)	ST	9 October 1998 (aged 21)	Kafue Celtic	2017	2024	84	34
77	Noah Okafor	(Switzerland)	ST	24 May 2000 (aged 20)	Basel	2020	2024	15	4
FC Liefering Players
	Bryan Okoh	(Switzerland)	DF	16 May 2003 (aged 17)	Lausanne-Sport	2019	2022	0	0
	Luis Phelipe	(Brazil)	MF	12 February 2001 (aged 19)	Red Bull Brasil	2019	2024	0	0
	Maurits Kjaergaard	(Denmark)	MF	26 February 2003 (aged 17)	Lyngby	2019	2022	0	0
	Benjamin Sesko	(Slovenia)	ST	31 May 2003 (aged 17)	NK Domžale	2019	2022	0	0
Out on loan
2	Gideon Mensah	(Ghana)	DF	18 July 1998 (aged 21)	West African Football Academy	2016	2024	0	0
3	Jasper van der Werff	(Switzerland)	DF	9 December 1998 (aged 21)	St.Gallen	2018		5	0
11	Smail Prevljak	(Bosnia and Herzegovina)	ST	10 May 1995 (aged 25)	RB Leipzig	2014		48	15
	Luca Meisl	(Austria)	DF	4 March 1999 (aged 21)	Academy	2016		0	0
	Darko Todorović	(Bosnia and Herzegovina)	DF	5 May 1997 (aged 23)	Sloboda Tuzla	2018		14	0
	Kilian Ludewig	(Germany)	DF	5 March 2000 (aged 20)	Academy	2018		0	0
	Kim Jung-min	(South Korea)	MF	13 November 1999 (aged 20)	Gwangju	2018		0	0
	Ousmane Diakité	(Mali)	MF	25 July 2000 (aged 19)	Yeelen Olympique	2018		0	0
	Alexander Schmidt	(Austria)	ST	19 January 1998 (aged 22)	Academy	2016		0	0
	Samuel Tetteh	(Ghana)	ST	28 July 1996 (aged 23)	West African Football Academy	2016		0	0
Left during the season
8	Diadie Samassékou	(Mali)	MF	11 January 1996 (aged 24)	Real Bamako	2015		134	2
18	Takumi Minamino	(Japan)	ST	16 January 1995 (aged 25)	Cerezo Osaka	2015		199	65
27	Mahamadou Dembélé	(France)	MF	10 April 1999 (aged 21)	Paris Saint-Germain	2017		0	0
30	Erling Haaland	(Norway)	ST	21 July 2000 (aged 19)	Molde	2019	2024	27	29
34	Marin Pongračić	(Croatia)	DF	11 September 1997 (aged 22)	1860 Munich	2017		57	0
	Anderson Niangbo	(Ivory Coast)	MF	6 October 1999 (aged 20)	USC Bassam	2018		0	0

=== Out on loan ===
Note: Flags indicate national team as defined under FIFA eligibility rules; some limited exceptions apply. Players may hold more than one non-FIFA nationality.

No.	Pos.	Nation	Player
2	DF	GHA	Gideon Mensah (at Zulte Waregem)
3	DF	SUI	Jasper van der Werff (at Basel)
11	FW	BIH	Smail Prevljak (at K.A.S. Eupen)
—	DF	AUT	Luca Meisl (at SKN St. Pölten)
—	DF	BIH	Darko Todorović (at Holstein Kiel)

No.	Pos.	Nation	Player
—	DF	GER	Kilian Ludewig (at Barnsley)
—	MF	KOR	Kim Jung-min (at Admira Wacker)
—	MF	MLI	Ousmane Diakité (at Rheindorf Altach)
—	FW	AUT	Alexander Schmidt (at Wolfsberger AC)
—	FW	GHA	Samuel Tetteh (at LASK Linz)

== Transfers ==
=== In ===
Date	Position	Nationality	Name	From	Fee	Ref.
Summer 2019	FW	(Slovenia)	Benjamin Sesko	NK Domžale	Undisclosed	
Summer 2019	DF	(Switzerland)	Bryan Okoh	Lausanne-Sport	Undisclosed	
Summer 2019	MF	(Denmark)	Maurits Kjaergaard	Lyngby	Undisclosed	
18 July 2019	MF	(Brazil)	Luis Phelipe	Red Bull Brasil	Undisclosed	
19 July 2019	DF	(Denmark)	Rasmus Kristensen	Jong Ajax	Undisclosed	
13 August 2019	MF	(Austria)	Maximilian Wöber	Sevilla	Undisclosed	
31 January 2020	FW	(Switzerland)	Noah Okafor	Basel	Undisclosed	

=== Out ===
Date	Position	Nationality	Name	To	Fee	Ref.
1 July 2019	FW	(Israel)	Moanes Dabour	Sevilla	Undisclosed	
1 July 2019	MF	(Austria)	Hannes Wolf	RB Leipzig	Undisclosed	
Summer 2019	DF	(Austria)	Stefan Lainer	Borussia Mönchengladbach	Undisclosed	
Summer 2019	DF	(Denmark)	Asger Sørensen	1. FC Nürnberg	Undisclosed	
Summer 2019	MF	(Austria)	Mathias Honsak	Darmstadt 98	Undisclosed	
Summer 2019	FW	(Ghana)	David Atanga	Holstein Kiel	Undisclosed	
26 June 2019	DF	(Brazil)	Igor	SPAL	Undisclosed	
26 June 2019	MF	(Austria)	Xaver Schlager	VfL Wolfsburg	Undisclosed	
13 August 2019	MF	(Mali)	Diadie Samassékou	TSG 1899 Hoffenheim	Undisclosed	
29 August 2019	MF	(France)	Mahamadou Dembélé	Troyes	Undisclosed	
1 January 2020	FW	(Japan)	Takumi Minamino	Liverpool	Undisclosed	
3 January 2020	FW	(Norway)	Erling Haaland	Borussia Dortmund	Undisclosed	
15 January 2020	DF	(Croatia)	Marin Pongračić	VfL Wolfsburg	Undisclosed	
15 January 2020	FW	(Ivory Coast)	Anderson Niangbo	Gent	Undisclosed	

=== Loans out ===
Start date	Position	Nationality	Name	To	End date	Ref.
10 January 2019	FW	(Germany)	Mërgim Berisha	SCR Altach	6 January 2020	
24 January 2019	GK	(Brazil)	Carlos Miguel Coronel	Philadelphia Union	20 July 2019	
Summer 2019	DF	(Austria)	Luca Meisl	SKN St. Pölten	End of Season	
Summer 2019	MF	(Ivory Coast)	Anderson Niangbo	Wolfsberger AC	7 January 2020	
Summer 2019	MF	(Mali)	Ousmane Diakité	Rheindorf Altach	End of Season	
Summer 2019	FW	(Austria)	Alexander Schmidt	Wolfsberger AC	End of Season	
Summer 2019	FW	(Ghana)	Samuel Tetteh	LASK Linz	End of Season	
25 July 2019	DF	(Bosnia and Herzegovina)	Darko Todorović	Holstein Kiel	End of Season	
30 August 2019	DF	(Ghana)	Gideon Mensah	Zulte Waregem	End of Season	
30 August 2019	MF	(Mali)	Youba Diarra	St. Pauli	29 January 2020	
9 January 2020	DF	(Germany)	Kilian Ludewig	Barnsley	End of Season	
9 January 2020	DF	(Switzerland)	Jasper van der Werff	Basel	End of 2020/21 Season	
16 January 2020	MF	(South Korea)	Kim Jung-min	Admira Wacker	End of Season	
31 January 2020	FW	(Bosnia and Herzegovina)	Smail Prevljak	K.A.S. Eupen	End of 2020/21 Season	

=== Released ===
Date	Position	Nationality	Name	Joined	Date
Summer 2019	DF	(Austria)	Christoph Leitgeb	Sturm Graz	
Summer 2019	FW	(Norway)	Fredrik Gulbrandsen	İstanbul Başakşehir	25 June 2019

== Kits ==
Home (Domestic)	Away (Domestic)	Third	Home (Europe)	Away (Europe)

== Friendlies ==
28 June 2019	SV Kirchanschöring	0–3	Red Bull Salzburg
18:00 CEST (UTC+02:00)		Report	Haaland 44' (pen.); S. Aigner 67'; Niangbo 73'

3 July 2019	Red Bull Salzburg	0–1	CSKA Sofia
18:30 CEST (UTC+02:00)		Report	Evandro 35'

6 July 2019	Red Bull Salzburg	1–1	Arsenal Tula
16:00 CEST (UTC+02:00)	Haaland 90'	Report	Tkachyov 45+3'

12 July 2019	Red Bull Salzburg	3–1	Feyenoord
18:30 CEST (UTC+02:00)	Haaland 63'; Daka 76', 80'	Report	Burger 83'

13 July 2019	Red Bull Salzburg	4–0	Vorwärts Steyr
18:00 CEST (UTC+02:00)	Okugawa 28'; Hellermann 73', 74', 83'	Report

23 July 2019	Red Bull Salzburg	3–0	Kayserispor
18:30 CEST (UTC+02:00)	Okugawa 41'; Camara 45'; C.Adamu 85'	Report

31 July 2019	Red Bull Salzburg	3–5	Chelsea	Wals-Siezenheim
20:00 CEST (UTC+02:00)	Onguéné 50'; Minamino (yellow card) 79', (goal) 85' (pen.), 90+2'	Report	Pulisic 20', 28'; Barkley 23'; Zouma (yellow card) 41'; Pedro 57'; Batshuayi 88'	Stadium: Stadion Wals-Siezenheim; Attendance: 27,643; Referee: Christopher Jäger (Austria)

7 August 2019	Red Bull Salzburg	0–1	Real Madrid	Wals-Siezenheim
19:00 CEST (UTC+02:00)	Mwepu (yellow card) 63'; Farkas (yellow card) 72'	Report	Hazard 19'; Varane (yellow card) 54'; Carvajal (yellow card) 64'; Valverde (yellow card) 81'; Nacho (yellow card) 85'	Stadium: Stadion Wals-Siezenheim; Attendance: 30,188; Referee: Robert Schörgenhofer (Austria)

20 August 2019	Red Bull Salzburg	7–1	Blau-Weiß Linz	Taxham
19:00 CEST (UTC+02:00)	Koïta 9', 24'; Daka 14', 35', 75'; Prevljak 31'; Diarra 83' (pen.)	Report	Schubert 54'	Stadium: Sportplatz Taxham

5 September 2019	Red Bull Salzburg	3–0	Ried	Taxham
16:00 CEST (UTC+02:00)	Kim 40'; Prass 80'; Bekar 82'	Report		Stadium: Sportplatz Taxham

18 January 2020	Al-Arabi	0–6	Red Bull Salzburg	Qatar
15:00 CET (UTC+01:00)		Report	Szoboszlai 4'; Hwang 30'; Prevljak 51', 71'; Okugawa 60'; Daka 65'

25 January 2020	Red Bull Salzburg	6–3	Zenit St.Petersburg	Doha, Qatar
16:00 MSK (UTC+03:00)	Berisha 5'; Ramalho 33'; Hwang 34'; Adeyemi 63'; Pokorný 78'; Koïta 90'	Report	Osorio (yellow card) 4' (goal) 53'; Rakitskiy (yellow card) 7'; Kerzhakov (yellow card) 29'; Shatov 54'; Mak 76'	Stadium: Aspire Academy

22 May 2020	Red Bull Salzburg	1–1	WSG Swarovski Tirol	Wals-Siezenheim
18:00 CEST (UTC+02:00)	Vallci 52'	Report	Adjei 13'	Stadium: Stadion Wals-Siezenheim; Attendance: 0

== Competitions ==
=== Overview ===
Competition	First match	Last match	Starting round	Final position	Record							
Competition	First match	Last match	Starting round	Final position	Pld	W	D	L	GF	GA	GD	Win %
Bundesliga	26 July 2019	5 July 2020	Matchday 1	Winners	32	22	8	2	110	34	+76	68.75
Austrian Cup	19 July 2019	29 May 2020	First round	Winners	6	6	0	0	23	2	+21	100.00
Champions League	17 September 2019	10 December 2019	Group stage	Group stage	6	2	1	3	16	13	+3	33.33
Europa League	20 February 2020	28 February 2020	Round of 32	Round of 32	2	0	1	1	3	6	−3	0.00
Total					46	30	10	6	152	55	+97	65.22

Last updated: 5 July 2020
Source: Soccerway

=== Bundesliga ===
==== Regular stage ====
===== Results summary =====
Overall								Home						Away					
Pld	W	D	L	GF	GA	GD	Pts	W	D	L	GF	GA	GD	W	D	L	GF	GA	GD
22	14	6	2	74	26	+48	48	9	1	1	45	14	+31	5	5	1	29	12	+17

Last updated: 8 March 2020.
Source: See Results

===== Results by round =====
Round	1	2	3	4	5	6	7	8	9	10	11	12	13	14	15	16	17	18	19	20	21	22
Ground	A	H	H	A	H	A	H	A	H	H	A	H	A	A	H	A	H	A	H	A	A	H
Result	W	W	W	W	W	W	W	D	W	W	D	W	W	W	D	D	W	D	L	D	L	W
Position	4	1	1	1	1	1	1	1	1	1	1	1	1	1	1	1	1	1	2	2	2	2

Updated to match(es) played on 8 March 2020. Source: See Results
A = Away; H = Home; W = Win; D = Draw; L = Loss

===== Results =====
26 July 2019 1	Rapid Wien	0–2	Red Bull Salzburg	Vienna
20:45 CEST (UTC+02:00)		Report	Minamino 35'; Okugawa 82'	Stadium: Allianz Stadion; Attendance: 23,329; Referee: Alexander Harkam

4 August 2019 2	Red Bull Salzburg	4–1	Mattersburg	Wals-Siezenheim
17:00 CEST (UTC+02:00)	Minamino 8'; Okugawa 11'; Haaland 37' (pen.) (yellow card) 77'; Junuzović (yellow card) 49' (yellow-red card) 75'; Daka 50'; Szoboszlai (yellow card) 65'	Report	Thorsten (yellow card) 37'; Pušić 54' (pen.); Höller (yellow card) 83'	Stadium: Stadion Wals-Siezenheim; Attendance: 8,738; Referee: Andreas Heiß

10 August 2019 3	Red Bull Salzburg	5–2	Wolfsberger AC	Wals-Siezenheim
17:00 CEST (UTC+02:00)	Haaland 22', 56', 89'; Sollbauer 39'; Onguéné (yellow card) 46'; Mwepu (yellow card) 84'; Ramalho 90+2'	Report	Niangbo 7'; Ritzmaier (yellow card) 30'; Weissman 78'; Leitgeb (yellow card) 88'	Stadium: Stadion Wals-Siezenheim; Attendance: 10,402; Referee: Julian Weinberger

17 August 2019 4	SKN St. Pölten	0–6	Red Bull Salzburg	Sankt Pölten
17:00 CEST (UTC+02:00)	Ingolitsch (yellow card) 26'; Rasner (yellow card) 47'; Schütz (red card) 57'; Gartler (yellow card) 59'	Report	Szoboszlai (yellow card) 6'; Bernède (yellow card) 10'; Haaland 30', 50'; Hwang 38'; Minamino 53'; Ulmer 55'; Koïta 69'	Stadium: NV Arena; Attendance: 4,000; Referee: Dieter Muckenhammer

25 August 2019 5	Red Bull Salzburg	5–0	Admira Wacker	Wals-Siezenheim
17:00 CEST (UTC+02:00)	Ramalho (yellow card) 3'; Hwang 22' (pen.), 24'; Haaland 24'; Daka 71'; Koïta 80' (pen.)	Report	Cmiljanić (yellow card) 22'; Menig (yellow card) 84'	Stadium: Stadion Wals-Siezenheim; Attendance: 10,448; Referee: Harald Lechner

31 August 2019 6	Wattens	1–5	Red Bull Salzburg	Innsbruck
17:00 CEST (UTC+02:00)	Yeboah (yellow card) 52'; Wöber 56' (o.g.); Svoboda (yellow card) 59'	Report	Ashimeru 12'; Ramalho 31'; Haaland 41'; Hwang 58'; Szoboszlai 71' (pen.)	Stadium: Tivoli-Neu; Attendance: 5,032; Referee: René Eisner

14 September 2019 7	Red Bull Salzburg	7–2	Hartberg	Wals-Siezenheim
17:00 CEST (UTC+02:00)	Ramalho 23'; Okugawa 36'; Daka 50', 87'; Haaland 52', 86', 90'	Report	Nimaga (yellow card) 8'; Klem (yellow card) 19'; Huber 44'; Dossou 77'; Rakowitz (yellow card) 80'	Stadium: Stadion Wals-Siezenheim; Attendance: 8,933; Referee: Oliver Drachta

22 September 2019 8	LASK	2–2	Red Bull Salzburg	Linz
17:00 CEST (UTC+02:00)	Goiginger 4' (yellow card) 80'; Frieser 18'; Trauner (yellow card) 40'; Filipović (yellow card) 45+2' (yellow-red card) 75'; Wiesinger (yellow card) 57'; Michorl (yellow card) 76'	Report	Mwepu (yellow card) 17'; Daka 32', 90'	Stadium: Waldstadion Pasching; Attendance: 6,018; Referee: Robert Schörgenhofer

29 September 2019 9	Red Bull Salzburg	4–1	Austria Wien	Wals-Siezenheim
17:00 CEST (UTC+02:00)	Ashimeru 33'; Koïta 43', 79'; Farkas (yellow card) 45+1'; Okugawa 55'	Report	Vallci 2' (o.g.); Cavlan (yellow card) 25'; Jeggo (yellow card) 41'; Prokop (yellow card) 48'; Grünwald (yellow card) 60'	Stadium: Stadion Wals-Siezenheim; Attendance: 12,450; Referee: Alexander Harkam

5 October 2019 10	Red Bull Salzburg	6–0	Rheindorf Altach	Wals-Siezenheim
17:00 CEST (UTC+02:00)	Koïta 5'; Daka 11', 24', 60'; Farkas (yellow card) 56'; Prevljak 81'; Hwang 86'	Report	Fischer (yellow card) 15'; Thurnwald (yellow card) 52'	Stadium: Stadion Wals-Siezenheim; Attendance: 9,843; Referee: Harald Lechner

19 October 2019 11	Sturm Graz	1–1	Red Bull Salzburg	Graz
17:00 CEST (UTC+02:00)	Ljubic 17' (yellow card) 79'	Report	Pongračić (yellow card) 70'; Koïta 73'; Junuzović (yellow card) 86'	Stadium: Merkur-Arena; Attendance: 12,147; Referee: Dieter Muckenhammer

27 October 2019 12	Red Bull Salzburg	3–2	Rapid Wien	Wals-Siezenheim
17:00 CET (UTC+01:00)	Szoboszlai 31' (pen.); Haaland 38' (yellow card) 45+1'; Junuzović 90+4'	Report	Knasmüllner 45+1'; Barać 87'	Stadium: Stadion Wals-Siezenheim; Attendance: 17,218; Referee: Oliver Drachta

2 November 2019 13	Mattersburg	0–3	Red Bull Salzburg	Mattersburg
17:00 CET (UTC+01:00)	Mahrer (yellow card) 54'	Report	Daka 33', 41', 90+4'	Stadium: Pappelstadion; Attendance: 3,000; Referee: Christian-Petru Ciochirca

10 November 2019 14	Wolfsberger AC	0–3	Red Bull Salzburg	Wolfsberg
17:00 CET (UTC+01:00)	Rnić (yellow card) 14'; Ritzmaier (yellow card) 33'; Schmitz (yellow card) 59'; Niangbo (yellow card) 74'; Liendl (yellow card) 88'	Report	Haaland 4', 76', 88'; Ramalho (yellow card) 40'; Mwepu (yellow card) 74'	Stadium: Lavanttal-Arena; Attendance: 4,825; Referee: Walter Altmann

23 November 2019 15	Red Bull Salzburg	2–2	SKN St. Pölten	Wals-Siezenheim
17:00 CET (UTC+01:00)	Minamino 13'; Okugawa 34'	Report	Hofbauer (yellow card) 10'; Luxbacher 43' (pen.), (yellow card) 88'; Balić 60'; Riegler (yellow card) 90'; Riski (yellow card) 90+2'	Stadium: Stadion Wals-Siezenheim; Attendance: 9,481; Referee: Andreas Heiß

1 December 2019 16	Admira Wacker	1–1	Red Bull Salzburg	Maria Enzersdorf
14:30 CET (UTC+01:00)	Bakış 16'; Schösswendter (yellow card) 56'; Aiwu (yellow card) 59'; Leitner (yellow card) 90+4'	Report	Minamino (yellow card) 60'; Hwang 77'	Stadium: BSFZ-Arena; Attendance: 2,537; Referee: René Eisner

7 December 2019 17	Red Bull Salzburg	5–1	Wattens	Wals-Siezenheim
17:00 CET (UTC+01:00)	Daka 3'; Haaland 9'; Onguéné (yellow card) 26'; Okugawa 33'; Minamino 56'; Ulmer 82'; Ramalho (yellow card) 83'	Report	Rieder (yellow card) 81'; Hager 85'	Stadium: Stadion Wals-Siezenheim; Attendance: 8,107; Referee: Alan Kijas

14 December 2019 18	Hartberg	2–2	Red Bull Salzburg	Hartberg
17:00 CET (UTC+01:00)	Rep 24'; Heil (yellow card) 45+3'; Tadić 53' (pen.)	Report	Ashimeru (red card) 16'; Junuzović 34'; Vallci (yellow card) 43'; Ramalho (yellow card) 45+1'; Daka 85'; Mwepu (yellow card) 90+3'	Stadium: Profertil Arena Hartberg; Attendance: 3,068; Referee: Manuel Schüttengruber

14 February 2020 19	Red Bull Salzburg	2–3	LASK	Wals-Siezenheim
19:00 CET (UTC+01:00)	Ramalho (yellow card) 21'; Mwepu (yellow card) 35', (goal) 81'; Okugawa 40'; Wöber (yellow card) 72'	Report	Frieser 20', 56'; Holland 25', (yellow card) 41'; Filipović (yellow card) 51'; Wiesinger (yellow card) 61'; Ranftl (yellow card) 83'; Balić (yellow card) 86'	Stadium: Stadion Wals-Siezenheim; Attendance: 17,018; Referee: Harald Lechner

23 February 2020 20	Austria Wien	2–2	Red Bull Salzburg	Vienna
17:00 CET (UTC+01:00)	Madl (yellow card) 20'; Grünwald (yellow card) 30'; Monschein 67'; Palmer-Brown 89'	Report	Daka 7', 70'; Vallci (yellow card) 21'; Camara (yellow card) 44'; Wöber (yellow card) 73'; Ashimeru (yellow card) 77'	Stadium: Generali Arena; Attendance: 8,115; Referee: Dieter Muckenhammer

2 March 2020 21	Rheindorf Altach	3–2	Red Bull Salzburg	Altach
19:00 CET (UTC+01:00)	Sam 36', 52', (yellow card) 56'; Zwischenbrugger 80'	Report	Ramalho (yellow card) 34'; Hwang 62', 84'	Stadium: Stadion Schnabelholz; Attendance: 4,033; Referee: Walter Altmann

8 March 2020 22	Red Bull Salzburg	2–0	Sturm Graz	Wals-Siezenheim
14:30 CET (UTC+01:00)	Okugawa 46'; Wöber (yellow card) 63'; Daka 74'; Vallci (yellow card) 85'	Report	Ljubic (yellow card) 68'; Jantscher (yellow card) 84'	Stadium: Stadion Wals-Siezenheim; Attendance: 11,247; Referee: Julian Weinberger

===== Table =====
Pos	Team	Pld	W	D	L	GF	GA	GD	Pts	Qualification
1	Red Bull Salzburg	22	14	6	2	74	26	+48	48	Qualification for the Championship round
2	LASK (Note: LASK were deducted 12 points due to violation of pandemic restrictions.)	22	17	3	2	50	20	+30	42	Qualification for the Championship round
3	Rapid Wien	22	11	7	4	47	26	+21	40	Qualification for the Championship round
4	Wolfsberger AC	22	11	5	6	50	27	+23	38	Qualification for the Championship round
5	Sturm Graz	22	9	5	8	37	28	+9	32	Qualification for the Championship round

Source: Austrian Football Bundesliga
Rules for classification: 1) Points; 2) Goal difference; 3) Goals scored; 4) Matches won; 5) Away matches won; 6) Head-to-head points; 7) Head-to-head goal difference; 8) Head-to-head goals scored.

==== Championship stage ====
===== Results summary =====
Overall								Home						Away					
Pld	W	D	L	GF	GA	GD	Pts	W	D	L	GF	GA	GD	W	D	L	GF	GA	GD
10	8	2	0	36	8	+28	26	4	1	0	15	5	+10	4	1	0	21	3	+18

Last updated: 5 July 2020.
Source: See Results

===== Results by round =====
Round	1	2	3	4	5	6	7	8	9	10
Ground	H	A	A	H	A	H	A	H	H	A
Result	W	W	W	W	D	D	W	W	W	W
Position	1	1	1	1	1	1	1	1	1	1

Updated to match(es) played on 5 July 2020. Source: See results
A = Away; H = Home; W = Win; D = Draw; L = Loss

===== Results =====
3 June 2020 1	Red Bull Salzburg	2–0	Rapid Wien	Wals-Siezenheim
20:30 CEST (UTC+02:00)	Daka 9'; Hwang (yellow card) 66'; Okafor 90+1'	Report	Stojković (yellow card) 57'	Stadium: Stadion Wals-Siezenheim; Attendance: 0 Referee: René Eisner
Note: Match originally scheduled for 15 March, but postponed on 13 March due to the COVID-19 pandemic.

7 June 2020 2	TSV Hartberg	0–6	Red Bull Salzburg	Hartberg
17:00 CEST (UTC+02:00)		Report	Daka 4', 11', 46'; Mwepu 7', (yellow card) 78'; Koïta 40'; Okafor 90'	Stadium: Profertil Arena Hartberg; Attendance: 0 Referee: Julian Weinberger
Note: Match originally scheduled for 22 March, but postponed on 13 March due to the COVID-19 pandemic.

10 June 2020 3	Sturm Graz	1–5	Red Bull Salzburg	Graz
20:30 CEST (UTC+02:00)	Hierländer 16'; Spendlhofer (red card) 24'; Donkor (yellow card) 39' (yellow-red card) 70'; Domínguez (yellow card) 67'	Report	Szoboszlai 8', 10', 43'; Ashimeru (yellow card) 15'; Daka 21'; Hwang 66'	Stadium: Merkur-Arena; Attendance: 0 Referee: Harald Lechner
Note: Match originally postponed on 13 March due to the COVID-19 pandemic.

14 June 2020 4	Red Bull Salzburg	3–1	LASK	Wals-Siezenheim
19:30 CEST (UTC+02:00)	Szoboszlai 8'; Daka 11'; Vallci 81'	Report	Holland (yellow card) 24'; Raguž 56'; Trauner (yellow card) 89'	Stadium: Stadion Wals-Siezenheim; Attendance: 0 Referee: Walter Altmann
Note: Match originally postponed on 13 March due to the COVID-19 pandemic.

17 June 2020 5	Wolfsberger AC	0–0	Red Bull Salzburg	Wolfsberg
18:30 CEST (UTC+02:00)	Baumgartner (yellow card) 50'; Stratznig (yellow card) 83'; Jojić (yellow card) 86'; Novak (yellow card) 90+2'	Report	Szoboszlai (yellow card) 83'	Stadium: Lavanttal-Arena; Attendance: 0 Referee: Josef Spurny
Note: Match originally postponed on 13 March due to the COVID-19 pandemic.

21 June 2020 6	Red Bull Salzburg	2–2	Wolfsberger AC	Wals-Siezenheim
17:00 CEST (UTC+02:00)	Okugawa 19'; Mwepu 71'	Report	Stratznig (yellow card) 8'; Novak (yellow card) 48'; Leitgeb (yellow card) 77'; Ulmer 80' (o.g.); Liendl 84'; Rnić (yellow card) 90+3'	Stadium: Stadion Wals-Siezenheim; Attendance: 0 Referee: Robert Schörgenhofer
Note: Match originally postponed on 13 March due to the COVID-19 pandemic.

24 June 2020 7	Rapid Wien	2–7	Red Bull Salzburg	Vienna
20:30 CEST (UTC+02:00)	Kara 19'; Fountas (yellow card) 30', (goal) 90+2'; Stojković (yellow card) 30'; Schick (yellow card) 78'	Report	Okafor 22'; Mwepu 30'; Vallci (yellow card) 36', (goal) 44'; Szoboszlai 39'; Ramalho 60', (yellow card) 67'; Junuzović 65'; Hwang 79' (pen.)	Stadium: Allianz Stadion; Attendance: 0 Referee: Manuel Schüttengruber
Note: Match originally postponed on 13 March due to the COVID-19 pandemic.

28 June 2020 8	Red Bull Salzburg	3–0	TSV Hartberg	Wals-Siezenheim
17:00 CEST (UTC+02:00)	Ramalho 45', (yellow card) 90+3'; Hwang 53'; Daka 59'; Camara (yellow card) 74'	Report	Nimaga (yellow card) 34'	Stadium: Stadion Wals-Siezenheim; Attendance: 0 Referee: Andreas Heiß
Note: Match originally postponed on 13 March due to the COVID-19 pandemic.

1 July 2020 9	Red Bull Salzburg	5–2	Sturm Graz	Wals-Siezenheim
20:30 CEST (UTC+02:00)	Adeyemi 22'; Daka (yellow card) 42'; Onguéné 53'; Szoboszlai 73'; Koïta 85'; Berisha 88'	Report	Balaj (yellow card) 29'; Ljubic (yellow card) 32' (yellow-red card) 72'; Kiteishvili 79'; Domínguez 87'	Stadium: Stadion Wals-Siezenheim; Attendance: 0 Referee: Felix Ouschan
Note: Match originally postponed on 13 March due to the COVID-19 pandemic.

5 July 2020 10	LASK	0–3	Red Bull Salzburg	Pasching
17:00 CEST (UTC+02:00)	Andrade (yellow card) 17'; Trauner (yellow card) 58'	Report	Szoboszlai 67' (pen.); Ramalho 73', (yellow card) 81'; Camara 90+5' (pen.)	Stadium: Waldstadion; Attendance: 0 Referee: Robert Schörgenhofer
Note: Match originally postponed on 13 March due to the COVID-19 pandemic.

===== League table =====
Pos	Team	Pld	W	D	L	GF	GA	GD	Pts	Qualification
1	Red Bull Salzburg (C)	32	22	8	2	110	34	+76	50	Qualification for the Champions League play-off round
2	Rapid Wien	32	17	7	8	64	43	+21	38	Qualification for the Champions League second qualifying round
3	Wolfsberger AC	32	15	9	8	69	43	+26	35	Qualification for the Europa League group stage
4	LASK (Note: LASK were deducted 12 regular season points for violating regulations with concern to the coronavirus. Because point totals are halved before the championship round, this resulted in a deduction of 6 championship round points. The punishment was later reduced to 4 points.)	32	20	4	8	67	37	+30	33	Qualification for the Europa League third qualifying round
5	Hartberg (O)	32	12	6	14	52	74	−22	27	Qualification for the Europa League play-off final
6	Sturm Graz	32	10	5	17	46	60	−14	19	

Rules for classification: 1) Points; 2) Points with (possible) half points subtracted due to rounding; 3) Goal difference; 4) Goals scored; 5) Matches won; 6) Away matches won; 7) Head-to-head points; 8) Head-to-head goal difference; 9) Head-to-head goals scored.
(C) Champions; (O) Play-off winners

=== Austrian Cup ===
19 July 2019 First round	SC-ESV Parndorf 1919	1–7	Red Bull Salzburg	Parndorf
20:30 CEST (UTC+02:00)	Urgela 71'	Report	Minamino 5'; Haaland 34' (pen.), 73', 89'; Farkas 39', 54'; Daka 47'	Stadium: Heidebodenstadion; Attendance: 1,500; Referee: Gerhard Grobelnik

25 September 2019 Second round	Rapid Wien	1–2 (a.e.t.)	Red Bull Salzburg	Vienna
14:45 CEST (UTC+02:00)	Schwab (yellow card) 14' (yellow-red card) 66'; Ljubicic (yellow card) 54'; Kitagawa 56'; Velimirovic (yellow card) 62' (yellow-red card) 90+3'; Barać (yellow card) 82'; Stojković (yellow card) 90+3'	Report	Szoboszlai 51'; Minamino (yellow card) 82', (goal) 120+1'	Stadium: Allianz Stadion; Attendance: 20,400; Referee: Rene Eisner

30 October 2019 Round of 16	ASK Ebreichsdorf	0–5	Red Bull Salzburg	Ebreichsdorf
17:00 CET (UTC+01:00)	Životić (yellow card) 38'	Report	Okugawa 7'; Koïta 13', 75'; Daka 28'; Ashimeru (yellow card) 29'; Haaland 86'	Stadium: Sportzentrum Ebreichsdorf; Attendance: 3,100; Referee: Josef Spurny

9 February 2020 Quarter-final	SKU Amstetten	0–3	Red Bull Salzburg	Amstetten
18:00 CET (UTC+01:00)	Deinhofer (yellow card) 89'	Report	Okugawa 10'; Wöber (yellow card) 26'; Junuzović 53'; Mwepu 76'	Stadium: Ertl Glas Stadion; Attendance: 2,800; Referee: Christian-Petru Ciochirca

5 March 2020 Semi-final	Red Bull Salzburg	1–0	LASK	Wals-Siezenheim
20:45 CET (UTC+01:00)	Hwang 50'; Ramalho (yellow card) 75'; Szoboszlai (yellow card) 81'; Mwepu (yellow card) 90+1' (yellow-red card) 90+4'; Vallci (yellow card) 90+3'; Ashimeru (yellow card) 90+5'	Report	Frieser (yellow card) 30'; Schlager (yellow card) 50'; Ranftl (yellow card) 73' (red card) 90+8'; Wiesinger (yellow card) 90+6'	Stadium: Stadion Wals-Siezenheim; Attendance: 10,021; Referee: Robert Schörgenhofer

29 May 2020 Final	Red Bull Salzburg	5–0	Austria Lustenau	Klagenfurt
20:45 CEST (UTC+02:00)	Szoboszlai 19'; Stumberger 21' (o.g.); Okafor 53'; Ashimeru 65'; Vallci (yellow card) 75'; Koïta 79'	Report	Tiefenbach (yellow card) 39'; Freitag (yellow card) 51'	Stadium: Wörthersee Stadion; Attendance: 0 Referee: Dieter Muckenhammer
Note: Match originally scheduled for 1 May, but postponed due to the COVID-19 pandemic.

=== UEFA Champions League ===
==== Group stage ====
Pos	Team	Pld	W	D	L	GF	GA	GD	Pts	Qualification
1	(England) Liverpool	6	4	1	1	13	8	+5	13	Advance to knockout phase
2	(Italy) Napoli	6	3	3	0	11	4	+7	12	Advance to knockout phase
3	(Austria) Red Bull Salzburg	6	2	1	3	16	13	+3	7	Transfer to Europa League
4	(Belgium) Genk	6	0	1	5	5	20	−15	1	

Source: UEFA
Rules for classification: Group stage tiebreakers

17 September 2019 1	Red Bull Salzburg (Austria)	6–2	(Belgium) Genk	Wals-Siezenheim, Austria
21:00 CEST (UTC+02:00)	Haaland 2', 34', 45'; Hwang 36'; Szoboszlai 45+2', (yellow card) 62'; Nissen (yellow card) 47'; Bernède (yellow card) 50'; Ulmer 66'	Report	Lucumí 40'; Samatta 52', (yellow card) 83'; Bongonda (yellow card) 58'	Stadium: Stadion Wals-Siezenheim; Attendance: 29,520; Referee: Felix Zwayer (Germany)

2 October 2019 2	Liverpool (England)	4–3	(Austria) Red Bull Salzburg	Liverpool, England
21:00 CEST (UTC+02:00)	Mané 9'; Robertson 25'; Salah 36', 69'; Fabinho (yellow card) 86'	Report	Hwang 39'; Minamino 56'; Haaland 60'	Stadium: Anfield; Attendance: 52,243; Referee: Andreas Ekberg (Sweden)

23 October 2019 3	Red Bull Salzburg (Austria)	2–3	(Italy) Napoli	Wals-Siezenheim, Austria
21:00 CEST (UTC+02:00)	Haaland 40' (pen.), 72', (yellow card) 45+2'	Report	Mertens 17', 64'; Lozano (yellow card) 38'; Malcuit (yellow card) 39'; Insigne 73'; Llorente (yellow card) 90'	Stadium: Stadion Wals-Siezenheim; Attendance: 29,520; Referee: Clément Turpin (France)

5 November 2019 4	Napoli (Italy)	1–1	(Austria) Red Bull Salzburg	Naples, Italy
21:00 CET (UTC+01:00)	Zieliński (yellow card) 27'; Lozano 44'	Report	Onguéné (yellow card) 4'; Haaland 11' (pen.); Pongračić (yellow card) 37'	Stadium: Stadio San Paolo; Attendance: 32,862; Referee: Szymon Marciniak (Poland)

27 November 2019 5	Genk (Belgium)	1–4	(Austria) Red Bull Salzburg	Genk, Belgium
21:00 CET (UTC+01:00)	Samatta (yellow card) 74', (goal) 85'	Report	Junuzović (yellow card) 21'; Daka 43'; Minamino 45'; Kristensen (yellow card) 46'; Hwang 69'; Haaland 87'	Stadium: Luminus Arena; Attendance: 17,284; Referee: Mattias Gestranius (Finland)

10 December 2019 6	Red Bull Salzburg (Austria)	0–2	(England) Liverpool	Wals-Siezenheim, Austria
18:55 CET (UTC+01:00)		Report	Mané (yellow card) 51'; Keïta 57'; Salah 58'	Stadium: Stadion Wals-Siezenheim; Attendance: 29,520; Referee: Danny Makkelie (Netherlands)

=== UEFA Europa League ===
==== Knockout phase ====
20 February 2020 Round of 32 1st Leg	Eintracht Frankfurt (Germany)	4–1	(Austria) Red Bull Salzburg	Frankfurt, Germany
18:55 CET (UTC+01:00)	Kamada 12', 43', 53'; Kostić 56'; Sow (yellow card) 84'	Report	Adeyemi (yellow card) 54'; Hwang 85' (pen.)	Stadium: Waldstadion; Attendance: 47,000; Referee: Ali Palabıyık (Turkey)

28 February 2020 Round of 32 2nd Leg	Red Bull Salzburg (Austria)	2–2 (3–6 agg.)	(Germany) Eintracht Frankfurt	Wals-Siezenheim, Austria
18:00 CET (UTC+01:00)	Koïta (yellow card) 5'; Ulmer 10'; Hwang (yellow card) 15'; Onguéné 72'; Okafor (yellow card) 90+1'	Report	Kamada (yellow card) 26'; Silva 30', 83'; Abraham (yellow card) 59'; Ilsanker (yellow card) 89'	Stadium: Stadion Wals-Siezenheim; Attendance: 29,000; Referee: Benoît Bastien (France)
Note: The match between Red Bull Salzburg and Eintracht Frankfurt, originally scheduled to be played on 27 February, 21:00 CET, was postponed to 28 February, 18:00 CET, due to a storm warning.

== Statistics ==
As of match played 5 July 2020

=== Appearances and goals ===
No.	Pos	Nat	Player	Total		Bundesliga		Austrian Cup		UEFA Champions League		UEFA Europa League	
No.	Pos	Nat	Player	Apps	Goals	Apps	Goals	Apps	Goals	Apps	Goals	Apps	Goals
1	GK	(Austria) AUT	Cican Stankovic	38	0	27	0	5	0	4	0	2	0
4	MF	(Ghana) GHA	Majeed Ashimeru	29	3	15+5	2	3+2	1	0+4	0	0	0
5	DF	(Austria) AUT	Albert Vallci	23	2	15+3	2	3	0	0+1	0	1	0
6	DF	(Cameroon) CMR	Jérôme Onguéné	33	2	19+3	1	3+2	0	4	0	2	1
7	FW	(Mali) MLI	Sékou Koïta	23	11	7+9	8	2+2	3	0+1	0	1+1	0
8	FW	(Germany) GER	Mërgim Berisha	10	1	3+5	1	0+1	0	0	0	0+1	0
9	FW	(South Korea) KOR	Hwang Hee-chan	40	16	17+10	11	3+2	1	6	3	2	1
14	MF	(Hungary) HUN	Dominik Szoboszlai	40	12	18+9	9	5+1	2	5	1	2	0
15	DF	(Brazil) BRA	André Ramalho	35	6	26	6	6	0	2	0	1	0
16	MF	(Austria) AUT	Zlatko Junuzović	33	4	19+3	3	4	1	6	0	1	0
17	DF	(Austria) AUT	Andreas Ulmer	42	4	26+3	2	5	0	6	1	2	1
19	MF	(Mali) MLI	Mohamed Camara	16	1	11+2	1	1	0	0	0	1+1	0
20	FW	(Zambia) ZAM	Patson Daka	45	27	20+11	24	6	2	3+3	1	2	0
25	DF	(Austria) AUT	Patrick Farkas	23	2	12+6	0	2+1	2	0+1	0	1	0
27	MF	(Germany) GER	Karim Adeyemi	12	1	2+8	1	0+1	0	0	0	0+1	0
28	MF	(France) FRA	Antoine Bernède	15	0	8+2	0	2+1	0	1	0	0+1	0
31	GK	(Brazil) BRA	Carlos Miguel	9	0	5	0	1	0	2+1	0	0	0
37	MF	(Japan) JPN	Masaya Okugawa	33	11	17+6	9	3+2	2	0+4	0	1	0
39	DF	(Austria) AUT	Maximilian Wöber	35	0	22+3	0	3	0	6	0	1	0
43	DF	(Denmark) DEN	Rasmus Kristensen	20	0	10+2	0	1+1	0	6	0	0	0
45	MF	(Zambia) ZAM	Enock Mwepu	36	5	16+9	4	3+1	1	4+1	0	2	0
77	FW	(Switzerland) SUI	Noah Okafor	15	4	5+6	3	1+2	1	0	0	0+1	0
Players also registered for Liefering :
Players away on loan :
11	FW	(Bosnia and Herzegovina) BIH	Smail Prevljak	5	1	4	1	0+1	0	0	0	0	0
Players who left Red Bull Salzburg during the season:
8	MF	(Mali) MLI	Diadie Samassékou	1	0	1	0	0	0	0	0	0	0
18	FW	(Japan) JPN	Takumi Minamino	22	9	11+3	5	2	2	6	2	0	0
30	FW	(Norway) NOR	Erling Haaland	22	28	11+3	16	1+1	4	4+2	8	0	0
34	DF	(Croatia) CRO	Marin Pongračić	8	0	5+1	0	1	0	1	0	0	0

=== Goalscorers ===
Place	Position	Nation	Number	Name	Bundesliga	Austrian Cup	UEFA Champions League	UEFA Europa League	Total
1	FW	(Norway)	30	Erling Haaland	16	4	8	0	28
2	FW	(Zambia)	20	Patson Daka	24	2	1	0	27
3	FW	(South Korea)	9	Hwang Hee-chan	11	1	3	1	16
4	MF	(Hungary)	14	Dominik Szoboszlai	9	2	1	0	12
5	FW	(Japan)	37	Masaya Okugawa	9	2	0	0	11
5	FW	(Mali)	7	Sékou Koïta	8	3	0	0	11
7	MF	(Japan)	18	Takumi Minamino	5	2	2	0	9
8	DF	(Brazil)	15	André Ramalho	6	0	0	0	6
9	MF	(Zambia)	45	Enock Mwepu	4	1	0	0	5
10	MF	(Austria)	16	Zlatko Junuzović	3	1	0	0	4
10	MF	(Switzerland)	77	Noah Okafor	3	1	0	0	4
10	DF	(Austria)	17	Andreas Ulmer	2	0	1	1	4
13	MF	(Ghana)	4	Majeed Ashimeru	2	1	0	0	3
14	DF	(Austria)	5	Albert Vallci	2	0	0	0	2
14	DF	(Cameroon)	6	Jérôme Onguéné	1	0	0	1	2
14	DF	(Austria)	25	Patrick Farkas	0	2	0	0	2
17	FW	(Bosnia and Herzegovina)	11	Smail Prevljak	1	0	0	0	1
17	MF	(Germany)	27	Karim Adeyemi	1	0	0	0	1
17	FW	(Germany)	8	Mërgim Berisha	1	0	0	0	1
17	MF	(Mali)	19	Mohamed Camara	1	0	0	0	1
Own goal					1	1	0	0	2
				TOTALS	110	23	16	3	152

=== Clean sheets ===
Place	Position	Nation	Number	Name	Bundesliga	Austrian Cup	UEFA Champions League	UEFA Europa League	Total
1	GK	(Austria)	1	Cican Stankovic	10	3	0	0	13
2	GK	(Brazil)	31	Carlos Miguel	2	1	0	0	3
				TOTALS	11	4	0	0	15

=== Disciplinary record ===
Number	Nation	Position	Name	Bundesliga		Austrian Cup		UEFA Champions League		UEFA Europa League		Total	
Number	Nation	Position	Name	Yellow card	Red card	Yellow card	Red card	Yellow card	Red card	Yellow card	Red card	Yellow card	Red card
1	(Austria)	GK	Cican Stankovic	0	0	1	0	0	0	0	0	1	0
4	(Ghana)	MF	Majeed Ashimeru	2	1	2	0	0	0	0	0	4	1
5	(Austria)	DF	Albert Vallci	4	0	2	0	0	0	0	0	6	0
6	(Cameroon)	DF	Jérôme Onguéné	2	0	0	0	1	0	0	0	3	0
7	(Mali)	FW	Sékou Koïta	0	0	0	0	0	0	1	0	1	0
9	(South Korea)	FW	Hwang Hee-chan	1	0	0	0	0	0	1	0	2	0
14	(Hungary)	MF	Dominik Szoboszlai	3	0	1	0	1	0	0	0	5	0
15	(Brazil)	DF	André Ramalho	9	0	1	0	0	0	0	0	10	0
16	(Austria)	MF	Zlatko Junuzović	3	1	0	0	1	0	0	0	4	1
19	(Mali)	MF	Mohamed Camara	1	0	0	0	0	0	1	0	2	0
20	(Zambia)	FW	Patson Daka	1	0	0	0	0	0	0	0	1	0
25	(Austria)	DF	Patrick Farkas	2	0	0	0	0	0	0	0	2	0
27	(Germany)	MF	Karim Adeyemi	0	0	0	0	0	0	1	0	1	0
28	(France)	MF	Antoine Bernède	1	0	0	0	1	0	0	0	2	0
39	(Austria)	DF	Maximilian Wöber	3	0	1	0	0	0	0	0	4	0
43	(Denmark)	DF	Rasmus Kristensen	0	0	0	0	2	0	0	0	2	0
45	(Zambia)	MF	Enock Mwepu	6	0	2	1	0	0	0	0	8	1
77	(Switzerland)	FW	Noah Okafor	0	0	0	0	0	0	1	0	1	0
Players away on loan:
Players who left Red Bull Salzburg during the season:
18	(Japan)	FW	Takumi Minamino	1	0	1	0	0	0	0	0	2	0
30	(Norway)	FW	Erling Haaland	2	0	0	0	1	0	0	0	3	0
34	(Croatia)	DF	Marin Pongračić	1	0	0	0	1	0	0	0	2	0
			TOTALS	43	2	11	1	8	0	4	0	66	3
