= Jérôme Onguéné =

Cameroonian footballer (born 1997)

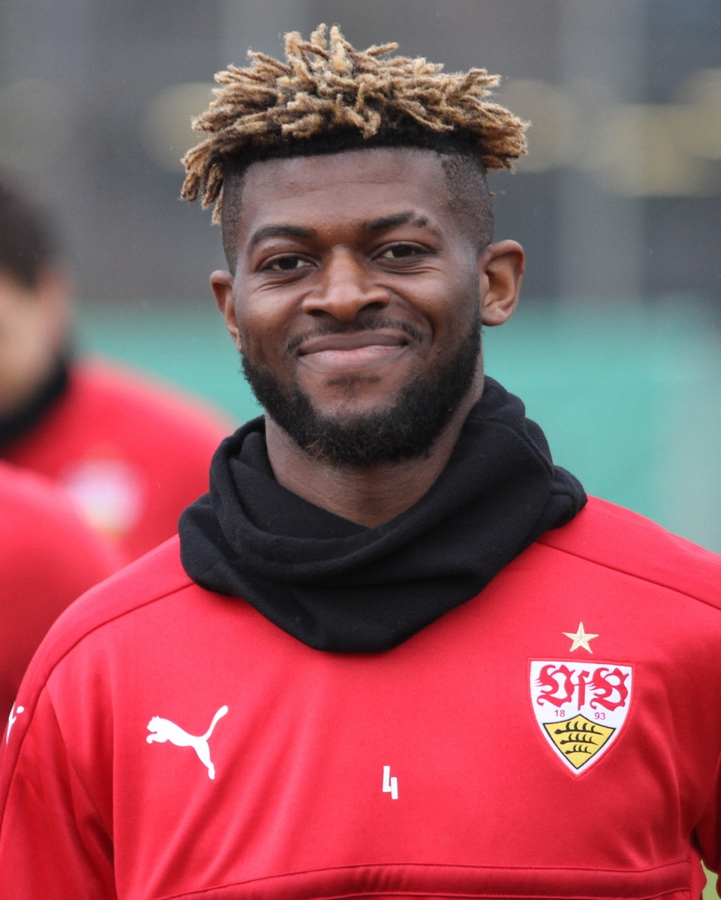

Personal information
- Full name: Jérôme Junior Onguéné
- Date of birth: 22 December 1997 (age 28)
- Place of birth: Mbalmayo, Cameroon
- Height: 1.86 m (6 ft 1 in)
- Position: Centre-back

Youth career
- 2009–2011: Illzach Modenheim
- 2011–2015: Sochaux

Senior career*
| Years | Team | Apps | (Gls) |
| 2014–2017 | Sochaux B | 27 | (0) |
| 2015–2017 | Sochaux | 45 | (1) |
| 2017–2018 | VfB Stuttgart | 0 | (0) |
| 2017 | VfB Stuttgart II | 2 | (0) |
| 2017–2018 | → Red Bull Salzburg (loan) | 17 | (4) |
| 2017 | → Liefering (loan) | 3 | (0) |
| 2018–2022 | Red Bull Salzburg | 56 | (7) |
| 2021 | → Genoa (loan) | 4 | (0) |
| 2022–2025 | Eintracht Frankfurt | 0 | (0) |
| 2023 | → Red Bull Salzburg (loan) | 0 | (0) |
| 2023–2024 | → Servette (loan) | 2 | (0) |
| 2025–2026 | Petrolul Ploiești | 4 | (0) |
| 2026 | → Eyüpspor (loan) | 13 | (0) |

International career^{‡}
| 2012–2013 | France U16 | 16 | (3) |
| 2013 | France U17 | 2 | (0) |
| 2014–2015 | France U18 | 3 | (0) |
| 2015–2016 | France U19 | 16 | (2) |
| 2016–2017 | France U20 | 8 | (1) |
| 2018–2022 | Cameroon | 10 | (0) |
Medal record
Men's football
Representing Cameroon
Africa Cup of Nations
| Third place | 2021 Cameroon |
Representing France
UEFA European Under-19 Championship
| Winner | 2016 Germany |
- * Club domestic league appearances and goals as of 10 June 2026 ‡ National team caps and goals as of 10 August 2022

Jérôme Junior Onguéné (born 22 December 1997) is a Cameroonian professional footballer who plays as a centre-back.

== Club career ==
On 31 January 2017, Onguéné moved to VfB Stuttgart. He was loaned to Red Bull Salzburg on 31 August 2017 until the end of the season. In June 2018 Onguéné moved permanently to Salzburg.

On 15 January 2021, Onguéné moved to Serie A club Genoa, on a loan until the end of the season. The loan included an option to buy.

On 25 March 2022, Onguéné signed a five-year contract with Eintracht Frankfurt in Germany, effective 1 July 2022. On 5 January 2023, Onguéné returned to Red Bull Salzburg on loan until the end of the season having failed to make an appearance for Frankfurt. He did not make any appearances for Red Bull during this stint, mostly dealing with knee issues. On 4 August 2023, Onguéné moved on a new loan to Servette in Switzerland.

== International career ==
Onguéné won the 2016 UEFA European Under-19 Championship with France. In August 2018 Onguéné switched his allegiance to Cameroon and was nominated for the match against Comoros in the 2019 Africa Cup of Nations qualification Group B. He made his debut for Cameroon in a 1–0 win over Malawi national football team on 12 October 2018.

== Career statistics ==
=== Club ===
As of match played 17 May 2026

Appearances and goals by club, season and competition
| Club | Season | League | | | National cup (Note: Includes Coupe de France, Austrian Cup, Swiss Cup, Turkish Cup) | | League cup (Note: Includes Coupe de la Ligue) | | Europe | | Other | | Total | |
| Club | Season | Division | Apps | Goals | Apps | Goals | Apps | Goals | Apps | Goals | Apps | Goals | Apps | Goals |
|---|---|---|---|---|---|---|---|---|---|---|---|---|---|---|
| Sochaux B | 2013–14 | CFA | 7 | 0 | — | | — | | — | | — | | 7 | 0 |
| Sochaux B | 2014–15 | CFA | 19 | 0 | — | | — | | — | | — | | 19 | 0 |
| Sochaux B | 2015–16 | CFA 2 | 1 | 0 | — | | — | | — | | — | | 1 | 0 |
| Sochaux B | Total | | 27 | 0 | — | | — | | — | | — | | 27 | 0 |
| Sochaux | 2014–15 | Ligue 2 | 3 | 0 | 0 | 0 | 1 | 0 | — | | — | | 4 | 0 |
| Sochaux | 2015–16 | Ligue 2 | 32 | 1 | 5 | 0 | 2 | 0 | — | | — | | 39 | 1 |
| Sochaux | 2016–17 | Ligue 2 | 10 | 0 | 0 | 0 | 4 | 0 | — | | — | | 14 | 0 |
| Sochaux | Total | | 45 | 1 | 5 | 0 | 7 | 0 | — | | — | | 57 | 1 |
| VfB Stuttgart | 2016–17 | 2. Bundesliga | 0 | 0 | — | | — | | — | | — | | 2 | 0 |
| VfB Stuttgart | 2017–18 | Bundesliga | 0 | 0 | 0 | 0 | — | | — | | — | | 0 | 0 |
| VfB Stuttgart | Total | | 0 | 0 | 0 | 0 | — | | — | | — | | 0 | 0 |
| VfB Stuttgart II | 2016–17 | Regionalliga Südwest | 2 | 0 | — | | — | | — | | — | | 2 | 0 |
| Red Bull Salzburg (loan) | 2017–18 | Austrian Bundesliga | 17 | 4 | 4 | 1 | — | | 1 (Note: Appearances in UEFA Europa League) | 0 | — | | 22 | 5 |
| Liefering (loan) | 2017–18 | Erste Liga | 3 | 0 | — | | — | | — | | — | | 3 | 0 |
| Red Bull Salzburg | 2018–19 | Austrian Bundesliga | 13 | 3 | 4 | 0 | — | | 5 | 0 | — | | 22 | 3 |
| Red Bull Salzburg | 2019–20 | Austrian Bundesliga | 23 | 1 | 5 | 0 | — | | 6 (Note: Four appearances in UEFA Champions League, two appearances and one goal in UEFA Europa League) | 1 | — | | 34 | 2 |
| Red Bull Salzburg | 2020–21 | Austrian Bundesliga | 9 | 1 | 2 | 0 | — | | 4 (Note: Appearances in UEFA Champions League) | 0 | — | | 15 | 1 |
| Red Bull Salzburg | 2021–22 | Austrian Bundesliga | 11 | 2 | 2 | 0 | — | | 5 | 0 | — | | 18 | 2 |
| Red Bull Salzburg | Total | | 56 | 7 | 13 | 0 | — | | 20 | 1 | — | | 89 | 8 |
| Genoa (loan) | 2020–21 | Serie A | 4 | 0 | — | | — | | — | | — | | 4 | 0 |
| Eintracht Frankfurt | 2022–23 | Bundesliga | 0 | 0 | 0 | 0 | — | | 0 | 0 | — | | 0 | 0 |
| Red Bull Salzburg (loan) | 2022–23 | Austrian Bundesliga | 0 | 0 | 0 | 0 | — | | 0 | 0 | — | | 0 | 0 |
| Servette (loan) | 2023–24 | Swiss Super League | 2 | 0 | 1 | 0 | — | | 0 | 0 | — | | 3 | 0 |
| Petrolul Ploiești | 2025–26 | Liga I | 4 | 0 | 2 | 0 | — | | — | | — | | 6 | 0 |
| Eyüpspor (loan) | 2025–26 | Süper Lig | 13 | 0 | 1 | 0 | — | | — | | 14 | 0 | | |
| Career total | | | 173 | 12 | 26 | 1 | 7 | 0 | 21 | 1 | 0 | 0 | 227 | 14 |

=== International ===
As of match played 6 February 2022

Appearances and goals by national team and year
| National team | Year | Apps | Goals |
|---|---|---|---|
| Cameroon | 2018 | 2 | 0 |
| Cameroon | 2019 | 3 | 0 |
| Cameroon | 2020 | 1 | 0 |
| Cameroon | 2021 | 2 | 0 |
| Cameroon | 2022 | 2 | 0 |
| Total | | 10 | 0 |

== Honours ==
VfB Stuttgart

- 2. Bundesliga: 2016–17

Red Bull Salzburg

- Austrian Bundesliga: 2017–18, 2018–19, 2019–20, 2021–22, 2022–23
- Austrian Cup: 2018–19, 2019–20, 2021–22, 2022–23

Servette

- Swiss Cup: 2023–24

France U19

- UEFA European Under-19 Championship: 2016

Cameroon

- Africa Cup of Nations bronze: 2021
