= Bryan Okoh =

Swiss footballer (born 2003)

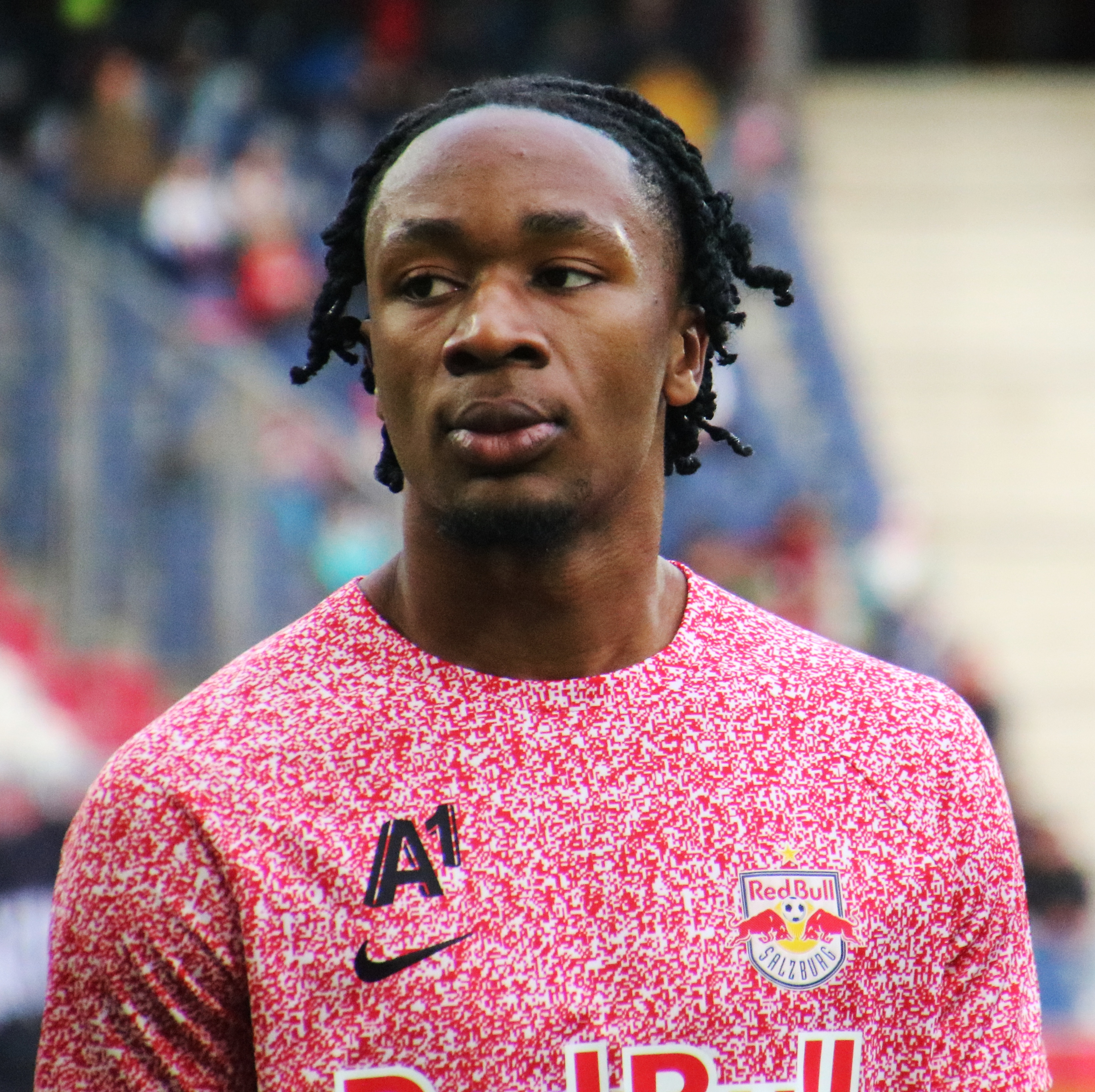
- Okoh warming up for Red Bull Salzburg in 2024

Personal information
- Birth name: Bryan Ikemefuna Okoh
- Date of birth: 16 May 2003 (age 23)
- Place of birth: Houston, Texas, United States
- Height: 1.88 m (6 ft 2 in)
- Position: Centre-back

Team information
- Current team: Auxerre
- Number: 24

Youth career
- 2010–2016: FC Espagnol Lausanne
- 2016–2019: Lausanne-Sport
- 2019–2020: Red Bull Salzburg

Senior career*
Years	Team	Apps	(Gls)
2019–2025	Red Bull Salzburg	1	(0)
2019–2025	→ FC Liefering (loan)	70	(4)
2025–2026	Lausanne-Sport	16	(0)
2026–	Auxerre	13	(3)

International career^{‡}
2017–2018	Switzerland U15	8	(1)
2018–2019	Switzerland U16	4	(1)
2019	Switzerland U17	4	(1)
2021–2024	Switzerland U21	5	(0)
- * Club domestic league appearances and goals as of 20 May 2026 ‡ National team caps and goals as of 10 September 2024

Bryan Ikemefuna Okoh (born 16 May 2003) is a professional footballer who plays as a centre-back for Ligue 1 club Auxerre. Born in the United States, he represents Switzerland at youth international level.

== Personal life ==
He was born in Houston, Texas, to an Igbo Nigerian father and a Congolese mother, but grew up in Switzerland.

== Club career ==
=== Early career ===
In 2010, Okoh began his career at FC Espagnol Lausanne, before moving to Lausanne-Sport in 2016. In 2019, he moved to the youth team of Red Bull Salzburg and has been playing in their feeder team of FC Liefering since 2019.

=== FC Liefering ===
On 9 August 2019, he made his professional debut for FC Liefering in an away match against SV Lafnitz, ending in a 2–0 loss.

=== Lausanne-Sport ===
In June 2025, Okoh returned to Switzerland to rejoin Swiss Super League side Lausanne-Sport.

=== Auxerre ===
On 29 January 2026, Okoh signed a three-and-a-half-year contract with French club Auxerre.

== International career ==
Okoh has represented Switzerland from under-15 to under-21 age group.

He is eligible to represent the United States, Switzerland, DR Congo, or Nigeria at the senior international level.

== Career statistics ==
As of match played 25 September 2024

Appearances and goals by club, season and competition
Club	Season	League			Austrian Cup		Continental		Other		Total	
Club	Season	Division	Apps	Goals	Apps	Goals	Apps	Goals	Apps	Goals	Apps	Goals
Red Bull Salzburg	2019–20	Austrian Bundesliga	0	0	0	0	0	0	—		0	0
Red Bull Salzburg	2021–22	Austrian Bundesliga	0	0	1	0	0	0	—		1	0
Red Bull Salzburg	2022–23	Austrian Bundesliga	1	0	0	0	0	0	—		1	0
Red Bull Salzburg	2024–25	Austrian Bundesliga	0	0	1	0	0	0	0	0	1	0
Red Bull Salzburg	Total		1	0	2	0	0	0	0	0	3	0
FC Liefering (loan)	2019–20	2. Liga	9	0	—		—		—		9	0
FC Liefering (loan)	2020–21	2. Liga	15	1	—		—		—		15	1
FC Liefering (loan)	2021–22	2. Liga	12	1	—		—		—		12	1
FC Liefering (loan)	2022–23	2. Liga	8	0	—		—		—		8	0
FC Liefering (loan)	2023–24	2. Liga	12	1	—		—		—		12	1
FC Liefering (loan)	2024–25	2. Liga	1	0	—		—		—		1	0
FC Liefering (loan)	Total		57	3	—		—		—		57	3
Career total			58	3	2	0	0	0	0	0	60	3

== Honours ==
Red Bull Salzburg

- Austrian Bundesliga: 2021–22, 2022–23
- Austrian Cup: 2021–22
