= Karim Adeyemi =

German footballer (born 2002)

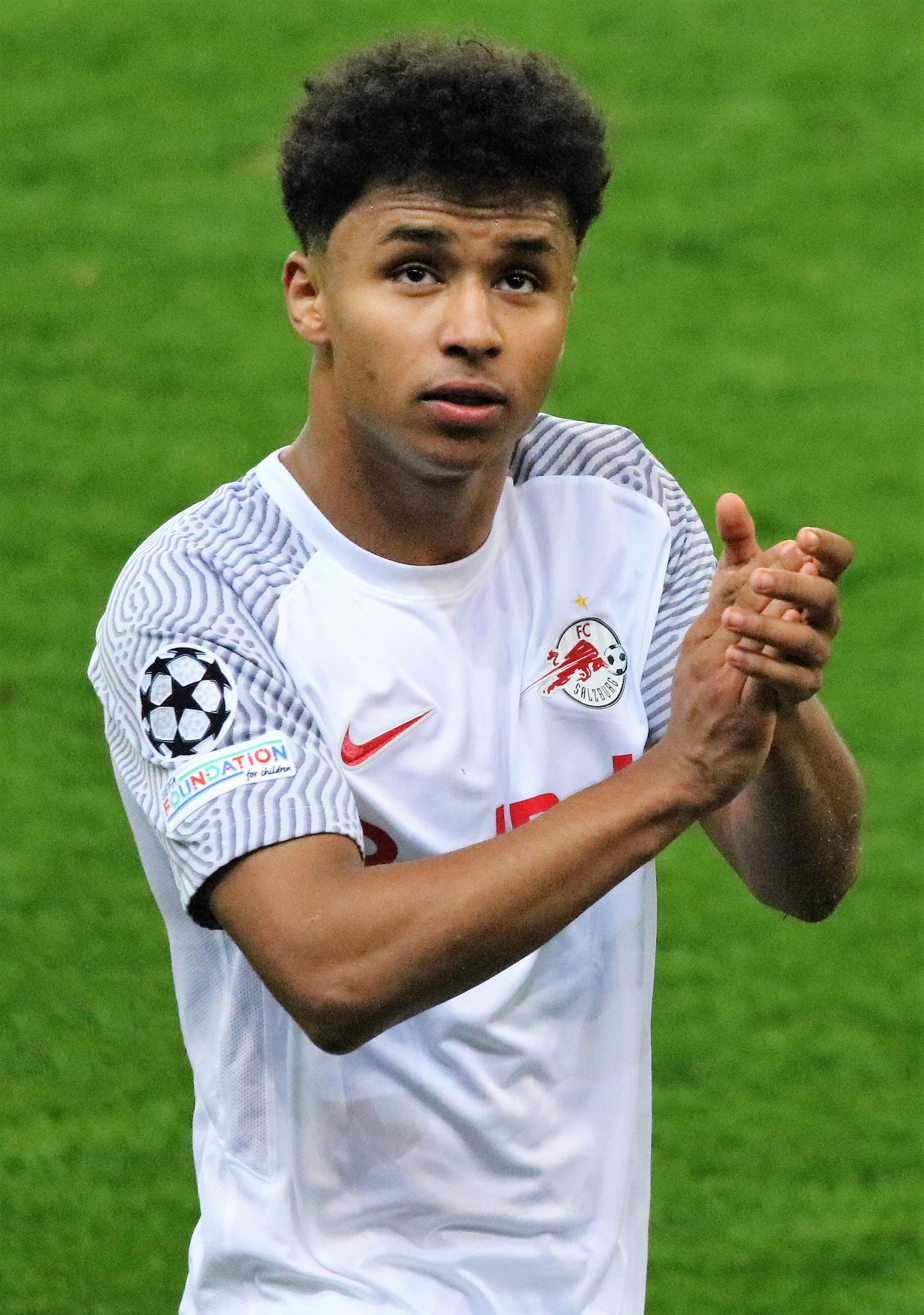
- Adeyemi with Red Bull Salzburg in 2022

Personal information
- Full name: Karim David Adeyemi
- Date of birth: 18 January 2002 (age 24)
- Place of birth: Munich, Germany
- Height: 1.80 m (5 ft 11 in)
- Positions: Winger; forward

Team information
- Current team: Barcelona
- Number: 14

Youth career
- 2008–2010: TSV Forstenried
- 2010–2012: Bayern Munich
- 2012–2018: SpVgg Unterhaching

Senior career*
Years	Team	Apps	(Gls)
2018–2022	Red Bull Salzburg	68	(27)
2018–2020	→ Liefering (loan)	35	(15)
2022–2026	Borussia Dortmund	98	(23)
2026–	Barcelona	13	(2)

International career^{‡}
2018	Germany U16	6	(2)
2018–2019	Germany U17	7	(3)
2021–2024	Germany U21	5	(6)
2021–	Germany	13	(1)
Medal record
Men's football
Representing Germany
UEFA European Under-21 Championship
Winner	2021 Hungary—Slovenia
- * Club domestic league appearances and goals as of 21:34, 22 November 2026 (UTC) ‡ National team caps and goals as of 20:55, 27 September 2026 (UTC)

Karim David Adeyemi (/kəˈriːm/ kuh-REEM /ˌɑːdɛˈjɛmi/ ah-deh-YEH-mee; born 18 January 2002) is a German professional footballer who plays as a right winger or forward for La Liga club Barcelona and the Germany national team.

Developed in SpVgg Unterhaching's youth system, Adeyemi made his senior football debut in 2018 with Austrian side Red Bull Salzburg. After winning six domestic titles with the club, he moved to Bundesliga club Borussia Dortmund in 2022 for an undisclosed fee. With the club, he scored the first Champions League goal of his career, helped Dortmund win their first Der Klassiker in five years, and reached the 2024 Champions League final. In 2026, he moved to La Liga side Barcelona for a reported fee of €29 million.

== Club career ==
=== Red Bull Salzburg ===
Adeyemi played as a youth for TSV Forstenried, and at the age of eight he joined local Bundesliga side Bayern Munich youth academy in 2010. Due to an impasse in negotiating his continued stay at the club, there was a dispute and Adeyemi eventually had to leave the club, which meant that he joined SpVgg Unterhaching in 2012. After progressing through the youth departments, he made his debut in March 2018 for the U19 team in the A-Junioren-Bundesliga (Under 19 Bundesliga). He scored his first goal in this league in April 2018 in a 2–3 loss to Eintracht Frankfurt U19. With Unterhaching, he suffered relegation to the A-Jugend Bayernliga (Under 19 Bayernliga) at the end of the season.

Prior to the 2018–19 season, Adeyemi was signed by Austrian club Red Bull Salzburg where he signed a three-year contract. He was subsequently loaned out to their feeder club FC Liefering for the season. Adeyemi made his 2. Liga debut on 1 September 2018 against Austria Lustenau, where he played the full game as Liefering lost 1–0. On 1 December 2020, he scored his first Champions League goal in a 3–1 away win over Lokomotiv Moscow during the 2020–21 season.

=== Borussia Dortmund ===
On 10 May 2022, Adeyemi was announced to have joined Bundesliga club Borussia Dortmund on a deal until the summer of 2027. On 5 October, he scored his first Champions League goal with Borussia Dortmund in a 4–1 away win over Sevilla. On 4 February 2023, he was recorded as the Bundesliga's fastest-ever player at 36.65 kilometres per hour (22.77 mph) during a match against Freiburg. Later that month, on 15 February, he scored the only goal from a solo strike in a 1–0 victory over Chelsea in the Champions League round of 16 first leg. On 30 March 2024, he scored the opening goal in a 2–0 away win over Bayern Munich, to be his club's first victory in Der Klassiker since 2019 and the first win at Allianz Arena in 10 years. He featured in the 2024 UEFA Champions League final against Real Madrid, missing a one-on-one opportunity in a goalless match before his side eventually suffered a 2–0 defeat.

On 1 October 2024, he scored his first hat-trick in the Champions League in a 7–1 home win over Celtic, becoming the third player in Dortmund history next to Robert Lewandowski and Marco Reus to score a hat-trick for Dortmund in the Champions League.

=== Barcelona ===
On 23 July 2026, Adeyemi joined La Liga club Barcelona on a five-year deal. The reported fee was €29 million. A month later, on 23 August, he scored his first goal for the club on his debut in a 5–0 away victory against Elche. On 9 September, he scored his first Champions League goal for the club against Feyenoord.

== International career ==
Adeyemi is a youth international for Germany, having represented the Germany under-16s, under-17s and under-21s, winning the Euro under-21 in 2021 with the latter. He made his debut for the Germany senior team in a 6–0 2022 FIFA World Cup qualification win over Armenia on 5 September 2021, coming on as a late substitute and scoring his side's sixth goal in the first minute of second-half injury time. As Adeyemi was a Red Bull Salzburg player on his debut, this marked the first time in the post-war period that a player from an Austrian club played a match for the German senior national team.

In November 2022, Adeyemi was named in the 26-man German squad for the 2022 FIFA World Cup in Qatar. However, he did not feature in any match, as Germany were knocked out at the group stage.

He missed the 2023 UEFA European Under-21 Championship due to a torn muscle fiber. After nearly four years of absence, he returned to Germany's senior squad in March 2025, featuring in the UEFA Nations League quarter-finals against Italy and helping the team reach the finals. Despite playing in the 2025 UEFA European Under-21 Championship qualification, Adeyemi opted out of the final tournament to join Borussia Dortmund at the 2025 FIFA Club World Cup, alongside teammates Maximilian Beier and Youssoufa Moukoko. Adeyemi also contributed to Germany's successful 2026 FIFA World Cup qualifying campaign in late 2025, but was not included in the final 26-man squad for the final tournament.

== Personal life ==
Adeyemi was born in Munich, Germany, to a Nigerian father and Romanian mother.

In 2023, Adeyemi started dating rapper Loredana Zefi, and they married in a private ceremony in October 2024.

In November 2025, Adeyemi and Zefi were fined 60 daily payments of €7,500 for illegal possession of weapons, after the Federal Police found brass knuckles and a taser in their possession. Adeyemi claimed he ordered a mystery box from the internet and was unaware of its contents, but still condemned his purchase, calling it a "careless mistake".

== Career statistics ==
=== Club ===
As of match played 22 November 2026

Appearances and goals by club, season and competition
Club	Season	League			National cup (Note: Includes Austrian Cup, DFB-Pokal, Copa del Rey)		Europe		Other		Total	
Club	Season	Division	Apps	Goals	Apps	Goals	Apps	Goals	Apps	Goals	Apps	Goals
FC Liefering (loan)	2018–19	Austrian 2. Liga	20	6	—		—		—		20	6
FC Liefering (loan)	2019–20	Austrian 2. Liga	14	9	—		—		—		14	9
FC Liefering (loan)	2020–21	Austrian 2. Liga	1	0	—		—		—		1	0
FC Liefering (loan)	Total		35	15	—		—		—		35	15
Red Bull Salzburg	2019–20	Austrian Bundesliga	10	1	1	0	1 (Note: Appearance in UEFA Europa League)	0	—		12	1
Red Bull Salzburg	2020–21	Austrian Bundesliga	29	7	4	1	5 (Note: Three appearances and one goal in UEFA Champions League, two appearances in UEFA Europa League)	1	—		38	9
Red Bull Salzburg	2021–22	Austrian Bundesliga	29	19	5	0	10 (Note: Appearances in UEFA Champions League)	4	—		44	23
Red Bull Salzburg	Total		68	27	10	1	16	5	—		94	33
Borussia Dortmund	2022–23	Bundesliga	24	6	2	1	6	2	—		32	9
Borussia Dortmund	2023–24	Bundesliga	21	3	1	0	12	2	—		34	5
Borussia Dortmund	2024–25	Bundesliga	25	7	1	0	10	5	5 (Note: Appearances in FIFA Club World Cup)	0	41	12
Borussia Dortmund	2025–26	Bundesliga	28	7	2	0	9	3	—		39	10
Borussia Dortmund	Total		98	23	6	1	37	12	5	0	146	36
Barcelona	2026–27	La Liga	13	2	0	0	3	2	0	0	16	4
Career total			214	67	16	2	56	19	5	0	291	88

=== International ===
As of match played 27 September 2026

Appearances and goals by national team and year
National team	Year	Apps	Goals
Germany
Germany	2021	4	1
Germany	2022	0	0
Germany	2023	0	0
Germany	2024	0	0
Germany	2025	7	0
Germany	2026	2	0
Total		13	1

As of match played 23 March 2025. Germany score listed first, score column indicates score after each Adeyemi goal.

List of international goals scored by Karim Adeyemi
No.	Date	Venue	Cap	Opponent	Score	Result	Competition
1	5 September 2021	Mercedes-Benz Arena, Stuttgart, Germany	1	Armenia	6–0	6–0	2022 FIFA World Cup qualification

== Honours ==
Borussia Dortmund

- UEFA Champions League runner-up: 2023–24

Red Bull Salzburg

- Austrian Bundesliga: 2019–20, 2020–21, 2021–22
- Austrian Cup: 2019–20, 2020–21, 2021–22

Germany U21

- UEFA European Under-21 Championship: 2021

Individual

- Fritz Walter Medal U19 Gold: 2021
- Fritz Walter Medal U17 Gold: 2019
- Austrian Bundesliga Top scorer: 2021–22
- Austrian Bundesliga Team of the Year: 2021–22
- Bundesliga Rookie of the Month: January 2023
- Bundesliga Goal of the Month: September 2025
- Bundesliga Rookie of the Season: 2022–23
- IFFHS Men's World Youth (U20) Team: 2022
