= Maximilian Wöber =

Austrian footballer (born 1998)

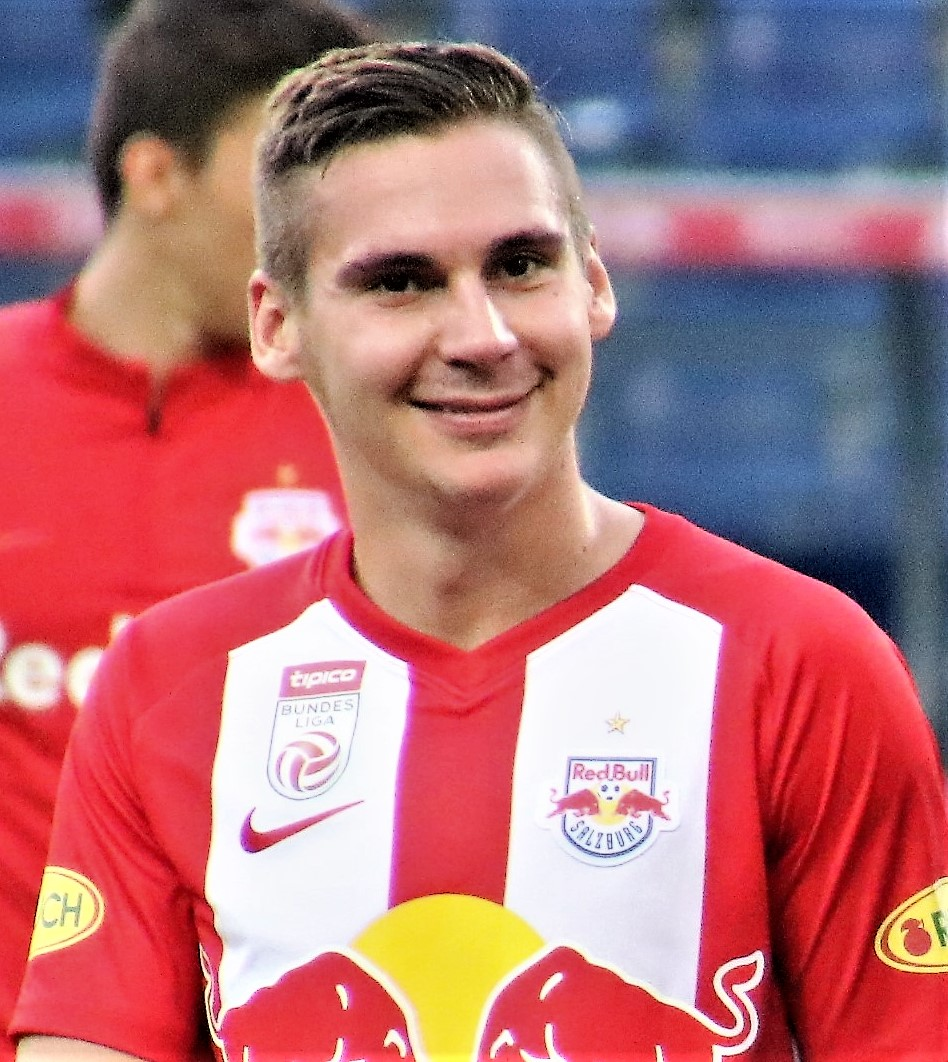
- Wöber with Red Bull Salzburg in 2019

Personal information
- Full name: Maximilian Wöber
- Date of birth: 4 February 1998 (age 28)
- Place of birth: Vienna, Austria
- Height: 1.88 m (6 ft 2 in)
- Position: Centre-back

Team information
- Current team: Schalke 04
- Number: 39

Youth career
- 2003–2007: SZ Marswiese
- 2007–2010: Wiener Sportklub
- 2010–2016: Rapid Wien

Senior career*
Years	Team	Apps	(Gls)
2015–2017	Rapid Wien II	28	(3)
2016–2017	Rapid Wien	16	(1)
2017–2019	Ajax	30	(1)
2017	Jong Ajax	1	(0)
2019	→ Sevilla (loan)	7	(0)
2019	Sevilla	0	(0)
2019–2023	Red Bull Salzburg	81	(5)
2023–2026	Leeds United	24	(1)
2023–2024	→ Borussia Mönchengladbach (loan)	25	(2)
2025–2026	→ Werder Bremen (loan)	2	(0)
2026	→ Werder Bremen II (loan)	1	(0)
2026–	Schalke 04	6	(1)

International career^{‡}
2013	Austria U15	2	(0)
2013–2014	Austria U16	5	(0)
2015	Austria U17	6	(0)
2015–2016	Austria U18	4	(0)
2016–2017	Austria U19	9	(0)
2017–	Austria	34	(0)
- * Club domestic league appearances and goals as of 22 October 2026 ‡ National team caps and goals as of 4 October 2026

Maximilian Wöber (born 4 February 1998) is an Austrian professional footballer who plays as a centre-back for Bundesliga club Schalke 04 and the Austria national team.

== Club career ==
=== Youth career ===
Born in Vienna, Wöber started his football career with Rapid Wien's youth teams.

=== Rapid Wien ===
In 2015, Wöber was called up for Rapid Wien's first team. On 25 February 2016, he made his senior team debut in the Round of 32 of 2015–16 UEFA Europa League against Valencia at Ernst-Happel-Stadion, playing the game as a starter for full-time game by coach Zoran Barisic.

=== Ajax ===
In August 2017, Wöber signed a four-year contract with Dutch side Ajax. The club paid a transfer fee of €7.5 million to Rapid Wien.

=== Sevilla ===
On 11 January 2019, Spanish La Liga side Sevilla reached an agreement with Ajax for the transfer of Wöber, He signed a contract until 2023, initially joining on loan with an obligatory buyout clause, for a reported fee of €10.5 million. He made his debut on 26 January 2019, starting in a 5–0 win against Levante.

=== Red Bull Salzburg ===
On 13 August 2019, Wöber agreed to a five-year contract with Austrian side FC Red Bull Salzburg for a reported fee of €12 million, making him the most expensive player in Austrian Bundesliga.

=== Leeds United ===
On 3 January 2023, Wöber signed a four-and-a-half-year contract with English Premier League club Leeds United for an undisclosed fee.

On 8 January 2023 Wöber made his debut in the FA Cup third round draw against Cardiff City as a second-half substitute at the Cardiff City Stadium. On 13 January 2023 he made his Premier League debut in the 2–1 defeat to Aston Villa.

==== Borussia Mönchengladbach (loan) ====
On 31 July 2023, Wöber joined German Bundesliga club Borussia Mönchengladbach on a season-long loan.

==== Return to Leeds ====
Wöber returned to Elland Road for the 2024–25 season, where he scored his first goal for The Whites in a 2–0 home win on 7 December 2024 over Derby County.

On 22 July 2026, Leeds United confirmed Wöber had left the club after the two parties agreed to mutually terminate the final 12 months of his contract.

==== Werder Bremen (loan) ====
On 4 July 2025, Wöber returned to the Bundesliga and joined SV Werder Bremen on loan.

=== Schalke 04 ===
On 22 July 2026, Wöber signed with Schalke 04 in Bundesliga.

== International career ==
Wöber got his first call up to the senior Austria side for 2018 FIFA World Cup qualifiers against Wales and Georgia in September 2017. On 6 October 2017, he made his debut for Austria in a 3–2 win against Serbia. He missed out on Austria's final squad for UEFA Euro 2020.

In June 2024, Wöber was called up to represent Austria at UEFA Euro 2024. He scored an own goal in their opening 1–0 defeat to France.

== Career statistics ==
=== Club ===
As of match played 17 October 2026

Appearances and goals by club, season and competition
Club	Season	League			National cup (Note: Includes Austrian Cup, KNVB Cup, FA Cup, DFB-Pokal)		League cup (Note: Includes EFL Cup)		Europe		Total	
Club	Season	Division	Apps	Goals	Apps	Goals	Apps	Goals	Apps	Goals	Apps	Goals
Rapid Wien B	2015–16	Austrian Regionalliga East	20	1	—		—		—		20	1
Rapid Wien B	2016–17	Austrian Regionalliga East	8	2	—		—		—		8	2
Rapid Wien B	Total		28	3	—		—		—		28	3
Rapid Wien	2015–16	Austrian Bundesliga	0	0	0	0	—		1 (Note: Appearance(s) in UEFA Europa League)	0	1	0
Rapid Wien	2016–17	Austrian Bundesliga	11	0	4	1	—		2	0	17	1
Rapid Wien	2017–18	Austrian Bundesliga	5	1	1	0	—		—		6	1
Rapid Wien	Total		16	1	5	1	—		3	0	24	2
Ajax	2017–18	Eredivisie	22	1	1	0	—		0	0	23	1
Ajax	2018–19	Eredivisie	8	0	2	0	—		6 (Note: Appearances in UEFA Champions League)	0	16	0
Ajax	Total		30	1	3	0	—		6	0	39	1
Jong Ajax	2017–18	Eerste Divisie	1	0	—		—		—		1	0
Sevilla (loan)	2018–19	La Liga	7	0	0	0	—		1	0	8	0
Red Bull Salzburg	2019–20	Austrian Bundesliga	24	0	3	0	—		7 (Note: Six appearances in UEFA Champions League, one appearance in UEFA Europa League)	0	34	0
Red Bull Salzburg	2020–21	Austrian Bundesliga	20	0	5	1	—		9 (Note: Eight appearances in UEFA Champions League, one appearance in UEFA Europa League)	0	34	1
Red Bull Salzburg	2021–22	Austrian Bundesliga	22	4	5	1	—		9	1	36	6
Red Bull Salzburg	2022–23	Austrian Bundesliga	15	1	3	1	—		3	0	21	2
Red Bull Salzburg	Total		81	5	16	3	—		28	1	125	9
Leeds United	2022–23	Premier League	16	0	3	0	—		—		19	0
Leeds United	2024–25	Championship	8	1	0	0	1	0	—		9	1
Leeds United	Total		24	1	3	0	1	0	—		28	1
Borussia Mönchengladbach (loan)	2023–24	Bundesliga	25	2	2	0	—		—		27	2
Werder Bremen (loan)	2025–26	Bundesliga	2	0	1	0	—		—		3	0
Werder Bremen II (loan)	2025–26	Regionalliga Nord	1	0	—		—		—		1	0
Schalke 04	2026–27	Bundesliga	6	1	0	0	—		—		6	1
Career total			221	14	30	4	1	0	38	1	290	19

=== International ===
As of match played 4 October 2026

Appearances and goals by national team and year
National team	Year	Apps	Goals
Austria	2017	2	0
Austria	2018	1	0
Austria	2019	3	0
Austria	2020	0	0
Austria	2021	0	0
Austria	2022	7	0
Austria	2023	8	0
Austria	2024	9	0
Austria	2025	1	0
Austria	2026	3	0
Total		34	0

== Honours ==
Ajax

- Eredivisie: 2018–19
- KNVB Cup: 2018–19

Red Bull Salzburg

- Austrian Bundesliga: 2019–20, 2020–21, 2021–22
- Austrian Cup: 2019–20, 2020–21, 2021–22

Leeds United

- EFL Championship: 2024–25
