= 2021–22 Austrian Football Bundesliga =

109th season of top-tier football in Austria

Austrian Bundesliga
- Season: 2021–22
- Dates: 23 July 2021 – 29 May 2022
- Champions: Red Bull Salzburg (16th title)
- Relegated: Admira Wacker Mödling
- Champions League: Red Bull Salzburg; Sturm Graz
- Europa League: Austria Wien
- Europa Conference League: Wolfsberger AC; Rapid Wien
- Matches: 195
- Goals: 563 (2.89 per match)
- Top goalscorer: Karim Adeyemi, Giacomo Vrioni (19 goals)
- Biggest home win: Red Bull Salzburg 7–1 Ried (1 August 2021)
- Biggest away win: Austria Klagenfurt 0–6 Red Bull Salzburg (10 April 2022)
- Highest scoring: Red Bull Salzburg 7–1 Ried (1 August 2021)
- Longest winning run: 10 matches Red Bull Salzburg
- Longest unbeaten run: 15 matches Red Bull Salzburg
- Longest winless run: 8 matches WSG Tirol; Admira Wacker Mödling
- Longest losing run: 6 matches Rheindorf Altach

The 2021–22 Austrian Football Bundesliga, also known as Admiral Bundesliga for sponsorship reasons, was the 110th season of top-tier football in Austria. The title was won by Red Bull Salzburg for the sixteenth time in their history, and ninth time in a row.

== Teams ==
=== Changes ===
St. Pölten was relegated to the 2021-22 Austrian Football Second League after finishing in last place in the 2020-21 Relegation Round. SK Austria Klagenfurt was promoted as champions of the 2020–21 Austrian Football Second League, despite finishing third in that competition. FC Blau-Weiß Linz finished in first, but did not apply for a Bundesliga license and FC Liefering took second place, but as a feeder team for FC Red Bull Salzburg, were also ineligible for promotion.

=== Stadia and locations ===
Location of teams in the 2021–22 Austrian Football Bundesliga

Team	Location	Venue	Capacity
Admira Wacker Mödling	Maria Enzersdorf	BSFZ-Arena	7,000
SK Austria Klagenfurt	Klagenfurt	Wörthersee Stadion	29,863
Austria Wien	Vienna	Generali Arena	17,500
LASK	Linz	Waldstadion Pasching	6,009
Rapid Wien	Vienna	Allianz Stadion	28,000
Red Bull Salzburg	Wals-Siezenheim	Red Bull Arena	17,218 (30,188)
Rheindorf Altach	Altach	Stadion Schnabelholz	8,500
Sturm Graz	Graz	Merkur-Arena	16,364
SV Ried	Ried im Innkreis	Keine Sorgen Arena	7,680
TSV Hartberg	Hartberg	Profertil Arena Hartberg	4,635
Wolfsberger AC	Wolfsberg	Lavanttal-Arena	7,300
WSG Tirol	Innsbruck	Tivoli Stadion Tirol	16,008

== Regular season ==
=== League table ===
Austrian Bundesliga regular season table
Pos	Team	Pld	W	D	L	GF	GA	GD	Pts	Qualification
1	Red Bull Salzburg	22	17	4	1	50	13	+37	55	Qualification for the Championship round
2	Sturm Graz	22	10	7	5	46	32	+14	37	Qualification for the Championship round
3	Wolfsberger AC	22	11	4	7	34	32	+2	37	Qualification for the Championship round
4	Austria Wien	22	8	9	5	31	23	+8	33	Qualification for the Championship round
5	Rapid Wien	22	8	7	7	35	31	+4	31	Qualification for the Championship round
6	Austria Klagenfurt	22	7	9	6	31	33	−2	30	Qualification for the Championship round
7	Ried	22	7	8	7	31	41	−10	29	Qualification for the Relegation round
8	LASK	22	6	7	9	28	29	−1	25	Qualification for the Relegation round
9	WSG Tirol	22	5	8	9	30	42	−12	23	Qualification for the Relegation round
10	Hartberg	22	5	7	10	29	35	−6	22	Qualification for the Relegation round
11	Admira Wacker Mödling	22	4	8	10	25	31	−6	20	Qualification for the Relegation round
12	Rheindorf Altach	22	3	4	15	10	38	−28	13	Qualification for the Relegation round

Source: Austrian Football Bundesliga
Rules for classification: 1) Points; 2) Head-to-head record; 3) Goal difference; 4) Goals scored; 5) Matches won; 6) Away matches won; 7) Away goals scored.

=== Results ===
Home \ Away	ADM	KLA	AWI	ALT	HAR	LIN	RWI	RBS	STU	RIE	WAT	WOL
Admira Wacker Mödling	—	4–0	1–2	2–0	1–1	0–3	1–2	0–1	1–1	1–2	0–1	0–1
Austria Klagenfurt	3–3	—	0–0	2–0	4–3	1–1	1–1	2–1	0–3	1–1	2–1	1–1
Austria Wien	2–2	1–1	—	0–0	2–0	2–3	1–1	0–1	2–1	4–1	1–1	1–0
Rheindorf Altach	0–2	0–4	0–2	—	0–2	0–1	2–1	1–1	0–1	1–1	0–3	1–2
Hartberg	1–1	0–2	3–4	1–2	—	2–1	1–1	0–1	3–2	1–1	0–1	2–2
LASK	3–1	2–2	0–2	0–1	1–1	—	1–1	0–0	1–3	1–0	3–0	0–1
Rapid Wien	1–2	3–0	1–1	1–0	0–2	3–2	—	1–2	0–3	3–0	5–2	3–0
Red Bull Salzburg	0–0	3–1	1–0	4–0	2–1	3–1	2–0	—	4–1	7–1	5–0	2–0
Sturm Graz	1–1	2–1	2–2	3–1	3–0	3–3	2–2	1–3	—	1–0	5–0	0–3
SV Ried	2–1	1–1	2–1	2–1	1–0	1–0	2–2	2–2	2–2	—	3–2	3–3
WSG Tirol	1–1	0–1	1–1	0–0	2–2	1–1	0–2	1–3	2–2	4–2	—	5–1
Wolfsberger AC	3–0	2–1	1–0	3–0	1–3	1–0	4–1	0–2	1–4	2–1	2–2	—

Source: soccerway.com
Legend: Blue = home team win; Yellow = draw; Red = away team win.

== Championship round ==
The points obtained during the regular season were halved (and rounded down) before the start of the playoff. As a result, the teams started with the following points before the playoff: Red Bull Salzburg 27, Sturm Graz 18, Wolfsberger AC 18, Austria Wien 16, Rapid Wien 15, and Austria Klagenfurt 15. The points of all teams but Austria Klagenfurt were rounded down – in the event of any ties on points at the end of the playoffs, a half point will be added for these teams.

Pos	Team	Pld	W	D	L	GF	GA	GD	Pts	Qualification	RBS	STU	AWI	WOL	RWI	KLA
1	Red Bull Salzburg (C)	32	25	5	2	77	19	+58	52	Qualification for the Champions League group stage	—	1–0	5–0	4–0	2–1	1–1
2	Sturm Graz	32	16	8	8	62	46	+16	37	Qualification for the Champions League third qualifying round	2–1	—	1–0	1–4	2–1	3–1
3	Austria Wien	32	11	13	8	44	39	+5	29	Qualification for the Europa League play-off round	1–2	4–2	—	2–1	1–1	1–1
4	Wolfsberger AC	32	14	5	13	48	53	−5	28	Qualification for the Europa Conference League third qualifying round	1–4	0–2	1–1	—	2–1	1–2
5	Rapid Wien (O)	32	10	11	11	48	45	+3	25	Qualification for the Europa Conference League play-offs	0–1	1–1	1–1	2–1	—	2–2
6	Austria Klagenfurt	32	8	12	12	43	57	−14	21		0–6	1–2	1–2	2–3	1–3	—

Legend: Blue = home team win; Yellow = draw; Red = away team win.
Rules for classification: 1) Points; 2) Points with (possible) half points subtracted due to rounding; 3) Head-to-head points; 4) Head-to-head goal difference; 5) Head-to-head goals scored; 6) Head-to-head away goals scored; 7) Goal difference; 8) Goals scored; 9) Matches won; 10) Away matches won; 11) Away goals scored.
(C) Champions; (O) Play-off winners

== Relegation round ==
The points obtained during the regular season were halved (and rounded down) before the start of the playoff. As a result, the teams started with the following points before the playoff: Ried 14, LASK 12, Tirol 11, Hartberg 11, Admira Wacker 10, and Rheindorf Altach 6. The points of Ried, LASK, Tirol, and Rheindorf Altach were rounded down – in the event of any ties on points at the end of the playoffs, a half point will be added for these teams.

Austrian Bundesliga relegation round table
Pos	Team	Pld	W	D	L	GF	GA	GD	Pts	Qualification	WAT	LIN	ALT	RIE	HAR	ADM
1	WSG Tirol	32	10	10	12	46	58	−12	28	Qualification for the Europa Conference League play-offs	—	4–0	0–3	2–0	4–2	0–0
2	LASK	32	9	12	11	44	42	+2	26	Qualification for the Europa Conference League play-offs	6–0	—	2–1	0–2	3–3	3–1
3	Rheindorf Altach	32	7	8	17	24	49	−25	22		2–1	0–0	—	1–1	0–0	2–2
4	Ried	32	8	13	11	40	54	−14	22		2–3	1–1	1–2	—	0–0	1–1
5	Hartberg	32	7	12	13	43	47	−4	22		0–1	0–0	4–0	1–1	—	1–2
6	Admira Wacker Mödling (R)	32	6	13	13	36	46	−10	21	Relegation to Austrian Football Second League	1–1	1–1	0–3	2–0	1–3	—

Source: Austrian Bundesliga
Legend: Blue = home team win; Yellow = draw; Red = away team win.
Rules for classification: 1) Points; 2) Points with (possible) half points subtracted due to rounding; 3) Head-to-head points; 4) Head-to-head goal difference; 5) Head-to-head goals scored; 6) Head-to-head away goals scored; 7) Goal difference; 8) Goals scored; 9) Matches won; 10) Away matches won; 11) Away goals scored.
(R) Relegated

== Europa Conference League play-offs ==
The winner and runner-up of the relegation round, the fifth-placed team from the championship round play to determine the qualifier to the Europa Conference League second qualifying round.

Semi-final			Final
			7	WSG Tirol	1	0	1
7	WSG Tirol	2	5	Rapid Wien	2	2	4
8	LASK	1

=== Semi-final ===
23 May 2022
18:00

WSG Tirol	2–1	LASK
Vrioni 22'; Sabitzer 45+1'	Report	Goiginger 88' (pen.)

Tivoli Stadion Tirol, Innsbruck
Referee: Rene Eisner

=== Final ===
26 May 2022
17:00

WSG Tirol	1–2	Rapid Wien
Vrioni 27'	Report	Grüll 10'; Auer 13'

Tivoli Stadion Tirol, Innsbruck
Referee: Sebastian Gishamer
29 May 2022
17:00

Rapid Wien	2–0	WSG Tirol
Ljubičić 29'; Binder 87'	Report

Allianz Stadion, Vienna
Referee: Stefan Ebner

== Statistics ==
=== Top scorers ===
As of 29 May 2022

Rank	Player	Club	Goals
1	(Germany) Karim Adeyemi	Red Bull Salzburg	19
1	(Albania) Giacomo Vrioni	WSG Tirol	19
3	(Austria) Jakob Jantscher	Sturm Graz	14
4	(Austria) Manprit Sarkaria	Sturm Graz	13
5	(Austria) Markus Pink	Austria Klagenfurt	12
6	(Italy) Kelvin Yeboah	Sturm Graz	11
6	(Israel) Tai Baribo	Wolfsberger AC	11
8	(Austria) Dario Tadić	Hartberg	10
8	(Austria) Sascha Horvath	LASK	10
10	8 players		9

== Awards ==
=== Annual awards ===
Award	Winner	Club
Player of the Year	(Austria) Jakob Jantscher	Sturm Graz
Top goalscorer	(Germany) Karim Adeyemi	Red Bull Salzburg
Manager of the Year	(Germany) Matthias Jaissle	Red Bull Salzburg
Breakthrough of the Year	(Austria) Nicolas Seiwald	Red Bull Salzburg

=== Team of the Year ===

Team of the Year
Goalkeeper	Patrick Pentz (Austria Wien)			
Defence	(Denmark) Rasmus Kristensen (Red Bull Salzburg)	(Austria) Maximilian Wöber (Red Bull Salzburg)	(Switzerland) Gregory Wüthrich (Sturm Graz)	(Austria) Andreas Ulmer (Red Bull Salzburg)
Midfield	(Austria) Manprit Sarkaria (Sturm Graz)	(Mali) Mohamed Camara (Red Bull Salzburg)	(Austria) Nicolas Seiwald (Red Bull Salzburg)	(Austria) Marco Grüll (Rapid Wien)
Attack	(Germany) Karim Adeyemi (Red Bull Salzburg)		(Austria) Jakob Jantscher (Sturm Graz)	
