= Wals-Siezenheim =

- Municipality
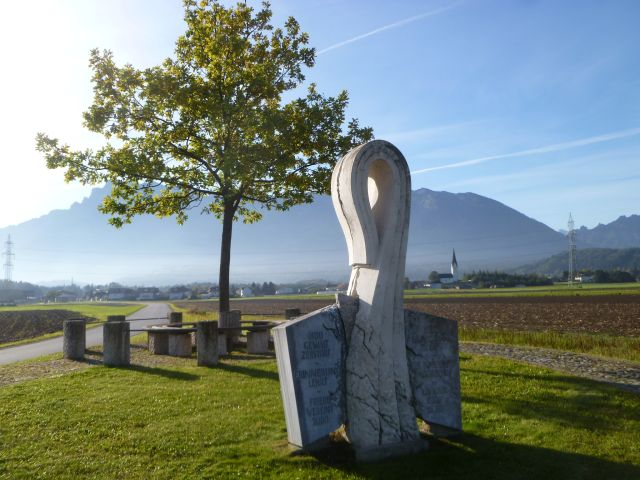
- Walserfeld Memorial, view to Gois and Untersberg

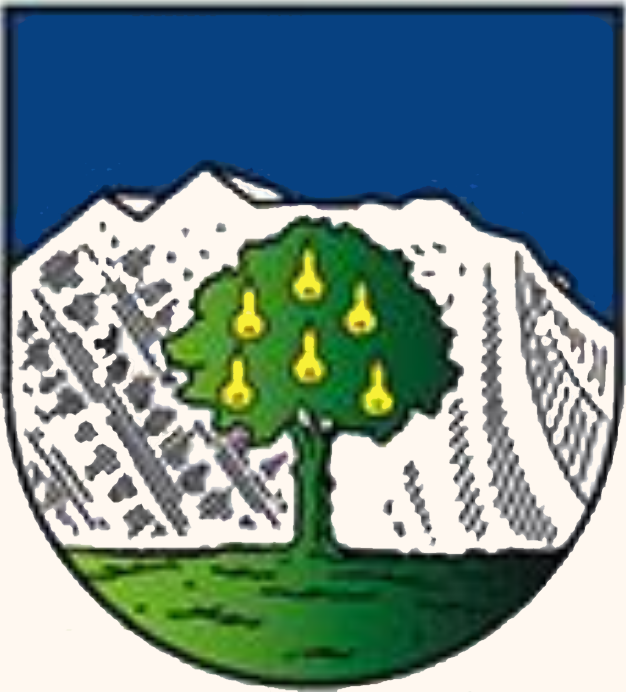
- Coat of arms

- Location within Austria
- Coordinates: 47°46′00″N 12°58′00″E
- Country: Austria
- State: Salzburg
- District: Salzburg-Umgebung

Government
  - Mayor: Joachim Maislinger (ÖVP)

Area
  - Total: 26.63 km^{2} (10.28 sq mi)
- Elevation: 446 m (1,463 ft)

Population (2024-01-01)
  - Total: 14,374
  - Density: 539.8/km^{2} (1,398/sq mi)
- Time zone: UTC+1 (CET)
  - Summer (DST): UTC+2 (CEST)
- Postal code: 5071, 5072
- Area code: 0662
- Vehicle registration: SL
- Website: www.wals-siezenheim.at

Wals-Siezenheim (Austrian German: [ˌvalsˈsiːtsn̩haɪm]) is a municipality in the district of Salzburg-Umgebung (Flachgau) in the Austrian state of Salzburg.

The double municipality had been founded in 1948 of the places Wals and Siezenheim. In the same year the arm had been conferred. The population figure rose up from 1,000 inhabitants in 1947 to approximately 11,000 in 2001. Previous Wals was part of the separate municipality Siezenheim, but even so Liefering and a giant part of Taxach.

== Geography ==
The municipality is located between the city of Salzburg in the east and the Austrian border with Germany in the west. It was established in 1948 by the merger of Wals and Siezenheim, after parts of its territories had been incorporated into the Salzburg city limits. The whole municipal area belongs to the suburbs of Salzburg, however, no further amalgamation efforts have been made so far. It currently comprises the cadastral communities of Wals I, Liefering I, Siezenheim I, and Gois.

Wals-Siezenheim is located immediately at Salzburg Airport with access to the Salzburg trolleybus system. It is the site of extended shopping malls and several branches of major industrial companies. The Walserberg locality is widely known for the former border checkpoint on the Austrian West Autobahn to the German Bundesautobahn 8. Border controls have been abolished with the implementation of the Schengen Agreement in 1997.

== Communities of Wals-Siezenheim ==
The municipal area includes 10 communities (In the brackets you can see the figure of inhabitants, standing 31 October 2011):

- Gois (409)
- Himmelreich (1,138)
- Käferheim (507)
- Kleßheim (88)
- Schwarzenbergkaserne (19)
- Siezenheim (2,653)
- Viehausen (1,979)
- Wals (3,489)
- Walserberg (862)
- Walserfeld (1,029)

== Neighbouring municipalities ==
Starting at direction 1 o'clock, clockwise:

- In Salzburg (state):
  - Salzburg
  - Grödig
  - Großgmain
- In Landkreis Berchtesgadener Land, Bavaria, Germany:
  - Bad Reichenhall
  - Piding
  - Ainring
  - Freilassing

== History ==
The oldest locality Siezenheim was already settled in Roman times and got his name of the Roman aristocrator Sizo. From 1690 onwards Schloss Klessheim was erected as a summer residence of the Salzburg archbishops. It is involved in a legend related to the Emperor Frederick Barbarossa resting under the Untersberg mountain until the end of the world, where a local pear tree will be the nexus of mankind's last great battle.

== Sport ==
- FC Red Bull Salzburg (football club playing in the Austrian Bundesliga).
- AC Wals (wrestling club).
- EV Wals (curling club).

== Notable people ==
- Franz Berger (1940–2012), wrestler
- Georg Marchl (born 1964), wrestler
- Martin Ragginger (born 1988), racing driver

== See also ==
- Wals Siezenheim Stadium
