= List of Austrian football transfers winter 2020–21 =

This is a list of Austrian football transfers for the 2020–21 winter transfer window. Only transfers featuring Austrian Football Bundesliga are listed.

== Austrian Football Bundesliga ==
Note: Flags indicate national team as has been defined under FIFA eligibility rules. Players may hold more than one non-FIFA nationality.

=== Red Bull Salzburg ===
In:

No.	Pos.	Nation	Player
11	MF	USA	Brenden Aaronson (from (United States) Philadelphia Union)
23	GK	GER	Nico Mantl (from (Germany) SpVgg Unterhaching)
95	DF	BRA	Bernardo (on loan from (England) Brighton & Hove Albion)
—	DF	MLI	Daouda Guindo (from (Mali) Guidars)
—	DF	COL	Lucho (from (Colombia) AAF Popayán)
—	MF	MLI	Mamady Diambou (from (Mali) Guidars)
—	MF	GHA	Forson Amankwah (from (Ghana) WAFA)
—	FW	MLI	Dorgeles Nene (from (Mali) Guidars)
—	FW	GHA	Daniel Owusu (from (Ghana) WAFA)

Out:

No.	Pos.	Nation	Player
4	MF	GHA	Majeed Ashimeru (on loan to (Belgium) Anderlecht)
6	DF	CMR	Jérôme Onguéné (on loan to (Italy) Genoa)
9	FW	AUT	Chukwubuike Adamu (on loan to (Switzerland) St. Gallen)
14	MF	HUN	Dominik Szoboszlai (to (Germany) RB Leipzig)
37	MF	JPN	Masaya Okugawa (on loan to (Germany) Arminia Bielefeld)
—	DF	MLI	Daouda Guindo (on loan to Liefering)
—	DF	COL	Lucho (on loan to SV Horn)
—	MF	MLI	Mamady Diambou (on loan to Liefering)
—	MF	GHA	Forson Amankwah (on loan to Liefering)
—	FW	MLI	Dorgeles Nene (on loan to Liefering)
—	FW	GHA	Daniel Owusu (on loan to SV Horn)
—	FW	GHA	Samuel Tetteh (on loan to St. Pölten, previously on loan at (United States) New York Red Bulls)

=== Rapid Wien ===
In:

No.	Pos.	Nation	Player

Out:

No.	Pos.	Nation	Player
40	MF	TUR	Melih İbrahimoğlu (to (Netherlands) Heracles Almelo)

=== WAC ===
In:

No.	Pos.	Nation	Player
3	DF	SWE	Gustav Henriksson (from (Sweden) Elfsborg)
18	FW	AUT	Thorsten Röcher (from (Germany) FC Ingolstadt 04)

Out:

No.	Pos.	Nation	Player
34	FW	AUT	Marc Andre Schmerböck (to TSV Hartberg)

=== LASK ===
In:

No.	Pos.	Nation	Player
8	FW	PER	Matías Succar (from (Peru) Deportivo Municipal)
28	FW	SVK	Adam Griger (from (Slovakia) Zemplín Michalovce)
—	FW	TUR	Metehan Altunbaş (from (Turkey) Eskişehirspor)

Out:

No.	Pos.	Nation	Player
22	DF	UKR	Yevhen Cheberko (on loan to (Croatia) Osijek)
23	MF	AUT	Stefan Haudum (to SCR Altach)
—	FW	TUR	Metehan Altunbaş (on loan to Juniors OÖ)

=== TSV Hartberg ===
In:

No.	Pos.	Nation	Player
11	MF	CRO	Matija Horvat (from Kapfenberger SV)
20	FW	AUT	Marc Andre Schmerböck (from WAC)
22	MF	AUT	Florian Flecker (from (Germany) Würzburger Kickers)

Out:

No.	Pos.	Nation	Player
11	MF	AUT	Lukas Gabbichler (to Grazer AK)
16	DF	MLI	Hamidou Maïga (free agent)
20	MF	AUT	Lukas Fadinger (on loan to Lafnitz)
22	DF	AUT	Alexander Burgstaller (to Wacker Innsbruck II)

=== Sturm Graz ===
In:

No.	Pos.	Nation	Player
23	FW	GHA	Kelvin Yeboah (from WSG Tirol)

Out:

No.	Pos.	Nation	Player
22	MF	AUT	Tobias Koch (on loan to Lafnitz)
37	FW	NGA	Emeka Eze (to (Turkey) Ankara Keçiörengücü)

=== Austria Wien ===
In:

No.	Pos.	Nation	Player
20	DF	DEN	Andreas Poulsen (on loan from (Germany) Borussia Mönchengladbach)
22	MF	GER	Eric Martel (on loan from (Germany) RB Leipzig)
23	MF	ALB	Agim Zeka (from (Belgium) Mouscron)
92	FW	AUT	Marco Djuricin (from (Germany) Karlsruher SC)

Out:

No.	Pos.	Nation	Player
3	DF	GAM	Maudo Jarjué (on loan to (Sweden) Elfsborg)
7	MF	AUT	Maximilian Sax (on loan to Admira Wacker)
20	FW	NGA	Bright Edomwonyi (on loan to (Greece) Atromitos)
26	FW	ISR	Alon Turgeman (to (Israel) Hapoel Haifa)

=== SCR Altach ===
In:

No.	Pos.	Nation	Player
6	DF	SRB	Neven Subotić (from (Turkey) Denizlispor)
27	MF	AUT	Stefan Haudum (from LASK)
31	FW	ARG	Danilo Carando (from (Peru) Cusco)
33	FW	HUN	Csaba Bukta (on loan from Liefering)
—	DF	AUT	Julian Klar (free agent)

Out:

No.	Pos.	Nation	Player
27	FW	CMR	Frantz Pangop (free agent)
—	DF	AUT	Julian Klar (on loan to SV Horn)

=== SKN St. Pölten ===
In:

No.	Pos.	Nation	Player
26	MF	AUT	Lukas Tursch (from Blau-Weiß Linz)
27	GK	AUT	Pirmin Strasser (from Hertha Wels)
30	MF	USA	Taylor Booth (on loan from (Germany) Bayern Munich II)
81	MF	USA	Brandon Servania (on loan from (United States) Dallas)
99	FW	GHA	Samuel Tetteh (on loan from Red Bull Salzburg, previously on loan at (United States) New York Red Bulls)

Out:

No.	Pos.	Nation	Player
24	FW	AUT	Lukas Grozurek (to (Georgia (country)) Dinamo Batumi)
38	MF	AUT	Christoph Messerer (on loan to SV Horn)

=== Admira Wacker ===
In:

No.	Pos.	Nation	Player
43	MF	AUT	Maximilian Sax (on loan from Austria Wien)
77	MF	GHA	David Atanga (on loan from (Germany) Holstein Kiel)
84	DF	GER	Matthias Ostrzolek (free agent)
93	DF	CRO	Niko Datković (from (Hungary) Kisvárda)
99	FW	USA	Andrew Wooten (from (United States) Philadelphia Union)

Out:

No.	Pos.	Nation	Player
9	FW	AUT	Stefan Maierhofer (to (Germany) Würzburger Kickers)
14	MF	DEN	Morten Hjulmand (to (Italy) Lecce)
17	FW	SRB	Aleksandar Ćirković (on loan to (Serbia) Mačva Šabac)
44	DF	CRO	Nikola Pejović (loan return to (Croatia) Lokomotiva)

=== WSG Tirol ===
In:

No.	Pos.	Nation	Player

Out:

No.	Pos.	Nation	Player
27	FW	GHA	Kelvin Yeboah (to Sturm Graz)

=== SV Ried ===
In:

No.	Pos.	Nation	Player
8	FW	AUT	Patrick Schmidt (on loan from (England) Barnsley)
25	MF	AUT	Patrick Möschl (free agent)
37	MF	SRB	Nikola Stosic (from Liefering)

Out:

No.	Pos.	Nation	Player
8	MF	AUT	Arne Ammerer (to Amstetten)
15	FW	ESP	Canillas (to (Spain) Algeciras)
26	DF	AUT	Felix Seiwald (on loan to Vorwärts Steyr)
29	FW	AUT	Valentin Grubeck (to Amstetten)

== See also ==
- 2020–21 Austrian Football Bundesliga
