= 2020–21 FC Red Bull Salzburg season =

Red Bull Salzburg
2020–21 season
- Chairman: Georgios Esplandatkoulos
- Manager: Jesse Marsch
- Stadium: Red Bull Arena
- Bundesliga: 1st
- Austrian Cup: Winners
- UEFA Champions League: Group stage
- UEFA Europa League: Round of 32
- Top goalscorer: League: Patson Daka (27); All: Patson Daka (34)
Home colours	Away colours	Third colours

The 2020–21 season was the 88th season in the existence of FC Red Bull Salzburg and the club's 32nd consecutive season in the top flight of Austrian football. They were the defending Austrian League and Austrian Cup champions. The season covered the period from 1 July 2020 until 30 June 2021.

== Season events ==
On 29 June, Alexander Walke signed a new one-year contract with the club.

On 8 July, Hwang Hee-chan moved from Red Bull Salzburg to RB Leipzig.

On 10 July, Red Bull Salzburg terminated their contract with Abdourahmane Barry.

On 13 July, Red Bull Salzburg announced the signing of Federico Crescenti from St. Gallen.

On 15 July, Luka Sučić signed a new contract with Red Bull Salzburg, until the summer of 2024.

On 16 July, Red Bull Salzburg announced the signing of Samson Tijani from Collins Edwin on a contract until 31 May 2025.

On 17 July, Amar Dedić signed a new contract with Red Bull Salzburg until 30 June 2024.

On 19 July, Red Bull Salzburg announced the signing of Oumar Solet on a five-year contract from Olympique Lyonnais.

On 27 July, Kim Jung-min left Red Bull Salzburg to join Vitória de Guimarães.

On 29 July, Philipp Köhn joined FC Wil on loan for the season.

On 11 August, Samuel Tetteh joined New York Red Bulls on loan until the end of 2020, whilst Darko Todorović joined Hajduk Split on a season-long loan deal the follow day, and Samson Tijani joined on TSV Hartberg on a similar deal on 13 August.

On 15 August, Alexander Schmidt left Red Bull Salzburg to sign for LASK.

On 17 August, Kilian Ludewig's loan deal at Barnsley was extended for the 2020–21 season.

On 26 August, Peter Pokorný joined SKN St. Pölten on a season-long loan deal.

On 28 August, Red Bull Salzburg's Austrian Cup match against Bregenz, scheduled for 29 August, was postponed after one of the Bregenz players tested positive for COVID-19.

On 31 August, Smail Prevljak left Red Bull Salzburg to sign permanently for KAS Eupen.

On 1 September, Luca Meisl left Red Bull Salzburg to sign permanently for SV Ried, whilst Gideon Mensah moved to Vitória de Guimarães on a season-long loan deal with the option to make the move permanent.

On 3 September, Red Bull Salzburg announced the signing of Mamadou Sangare to a five-year contract from Yeelen Olympique, whilst their Austrian Cup game against SC Bregenz was confirmed for 20:45 on 9 September.

On 5 October, Kilian Ludewig had his loan deal with Barnsley terminated, and was sent on loan to Schalke 04 for the season.

On 6 October, Albert Vallci extended his contract with Red Bull Salzburg until the summer of 2024. On 10 October, Chukwubuike Adamu extended his contract with Red Bull Salzburg until the summer of 2025.

On 16 October, Red Bull Salzburg announced the signing of Brenden Aaronson from Philadelphia Union on a contract until the summer of 2025, with Aaronson joining up with Salzburg over the winter break.

On 17 December, Dominik Szoboszlai was sold to RB Leipzig for an undisclosed amount. The Following day, 18 December, Zlatko Junuzović extended his contract with Red Bull Salzburg until 30 June 2022.

On 22 December, Red Bull Salzburg announced that Mali Internationals, Mohamed Camara and Sékou Koïta had tested positive for a banned substance following their recent International break.

On 4 January, Red Bull Salzburg announced the signings of Mamady Diambou, Dorgeles Nene and Daouda Guindo from Guidars FC, all on contracts until May 2025.

On 13 January, Red Bull Salzburg announced that Majeed Ashimeru had joined RSC Anderlecht on loan for the rest of the season, whilst Jérôme Onguéné moved to Genoa on a similar deal on 15 January.

On 18 January, Hungarian winger Csaba Bukta joined Rheindorf Altach on loan for the remainder of the season.

The next day, 19 January, Red Bull Salzburg sent Samuel Tetteh on loan to SKN St. Pölten, and re-signed Bernardo on loan from Brighton & Hove Albion for the remainder of the season.

On 20 January, Red Bull Salzburg announced the signing of Lucho from AAF Popayán, before sending him out on loan to SV Horn the following day. On 26 January, Red Bull Salzburg announced the signing of Rocco Zikovic from NK Istra on a contract until May 2023.

On 28 January, Daniel Antosch joined SV Horn on loan for the remainder of the season, whilst Nico Mantl joined from SpVgg Unterhaching on a contract until July 2025.

On 31 January Masaya Okugawa joined Arminia Bielefeld on loan for the remainder of the season, with Red Bull Salzburg announcing the signing of Kamil Piątkowski from Raków Częstochowa on a contract running to June 2026, with the defender joining in the summer transfer window.

On 8 February, Red Bull Salzburg announced the signing of Forson Amankwah and Daniel Owusu from West African Football Academy, with Owusu joining SV Horn on loan for the remainder of the season.

On 26 February, goalkeeper Carlos Miguel joined New York Red Bulls on loan until 31 December 2021, with Youba Diarra also joining New York Red Bulls on loan until 31 December 2021 on 1 March.

On 21 May, Alexander Walke signed a new one-year contract with Red Bull Salzburg, keeping him at the club until the summer of 2022.

== Squad ==
As of match played 22 May 2021

No.	Name	Nationality	Position	Date of birth (Age)	Signed from	Signed in	Contract ends	Apps.	Goals
Goalkeepers
1	Cican Stankovic	(Austria)	GK	4 November 1992 (age 34)	SV Grödig	2015		150	0
23	Nico Mantl	(Germany)	GK	29 December 1996 (age 29)	SpVgg Unterhaching	2021	2025	2	0
33	Alexander Walke	(Germany)	GK	6 June 1983 (age 43)	Hansa Rostock	2010	2022	229	0
Defenders
5	Albert Vallci	(Austria)	DF	2 July 1995 (age 31)	Wacker Innsbruck	2019	2024	60	5
15	André Ramalho	(Brazil)	DF	16 February 1992 (age 34)	Bayer 04 Leverkusen	2018		239	19
17	Andreas Ulmer	(Austria)	DF	30 December 1985 (age 40)	SV Ried	2008		492	22
22	Oumar Solet	(France)	DF	7 February 2000 (age 26)	Olympique Lyonnais	2020	2025	12	0
25	Patrick Farkas	(Austria)	DF	9 September 1992 (age 34)	SV Mattersburg	2017		61	5
39	Maximilian Wöber	(Austria)	DF	4 February 1998 (age 28)	Sevilla	2019	2024	69	1
43	Rasmus Kristensen	(Denmark)	DF	29 December 1996 (age 29)	Jong Ajax	2019	2024	62	4
95	Bernardo	(Brazil)	DF	14 May 1995 (age 31)	loan from Brighton & Hove Albion	2021	2021	41	4
Midfielders
11	Brenden Aaronson	(United States)	MF	22 October 2000 (age 26)	Philadelphia Union	2020	2025	25	7
13	Nicolas Seiwald	(Austria)	MF	4 May 2001 (age 25)	Academy	2020		18	0
16	Zlatko Junuzović	(Austria)	MF	26 September 1987 (age 39)	Werder Bremen	2018	2022	106	12
19	Mohamed Camara	(Mali)	MF	6 January 2000 (age 26)	Real Bamako	2018		41	2
21	Luka Sučić	(Croatia)	MF	8 September 2002 (age 24)	Academy		2024	27	2
27	Karim Adeyemi	(Germany)	MF	18 January 2002 (age 24)	SpVgg Unterhaching	2018	2022	49	10
28	Antoine Bernède	(France)	MF	26 May 1999 (age 27)	Paris Saint-Germain	2019		43	1
45	Enock Mwepu	(Zambia)	MF	1 January 1998 (age 28)	Kafue Celtic	2017	2024	119	17
	Ousmane Diakité	(Mali)	MF	25 July 2000 (age 26)	Yeelen Olympique	2018		0	0
Forwards
7	Sékou Koïta	(Mali)	FW	28 November 1999 (age 26)	USC Kita	2018	2024	52	27
8	Mërgim Berisha	(Germany)	FW	11 May 1998 (age 28)	Academy	2014		52	23
20	Patson Daka	(Zambia)	FW	9 October 1998 (age 28)	Kafue Celtic	2017	2024	125	68
30	Benjamin Šeško	(Slovenia)	FW	31 May 2003 (age 23)	NK Domžale	2019	2022	1	0
38	Antonin Svoboda	(Czech Republic)	FW	14 March 2002 (age 24)	Academy	2021		1	0
42	David Affengruber	(Austria)	FW	19 March 2001 (age 25)	Academy	2021		6	0
77	Noah Okafor	(Switzerland)	FW	24 May 2000 (age 26)	Basel	2020	2024	43	10
FC Liefering Players
14	Maurits Kjaergaard	(Denmark)	MF	26 February 2003 (age 23)	Lyngby	2019	2022	1	0
70	Amar Dedić	(Bosnia and Herzegovina)	DF	18 August 2002 (age 24)	Sturm Graz	2015	2024	1	0
	Rocco Zikovic	(Croatia)	DF	21 January 2005 (age 21)	NK Istra	2021	2023	0	0
	Daouda Guindo	(Mali)	DF	14 October 2002 (age 24)	Guidars FC	2021	2025	0	0
	Bryan Okoh	(Switzerland)	DF	16 May 2003 (age 23)	Lausanne-Sport	2019	2022	0	0
	Luis Phelipe	(Brazil)	MF	12 February 2001 (age 25)	Red Bull Brasil	2019	2024	0	0
	Forson Amankwah	(Ghana)	MF	31 December 2002 (age 23)	WAFA	2021	2025	0	0
	Mamady Diambou	(Mali)	MF	11 November 2002 (age 24)	Guidars FC	2021	2025	0	0
	Mamadou Sangare	(Mali)	MF	26 July 2002 (age 24)	Yeelen Olympique	2020	2025	0	0
	Dorgeles Nene	(Mali)	FW	23 December 2002 (age 23)	Guidars FC	2021	2025	0	0
	Federico Crescenti	(Switzerland)	FW	13 July 2004 (age 22)	St. Gallen	2020		0	0
Out on loan
3	Jasper van der Werff	(Switzerland)	DF	9 December 1998 (age 27)	St.Gallen	2018		5	0
4	Majeed Ashimeru	(Ghana)	MF	10 October 1997 (age 29)	West African Football Academy	2017	2024	42	3
6	Jérôme Onguéné	(Cameroon)	DF	22 December 1997 (age 28)	VfB Stuttgart	2018		92	11
9	Chukwubuike Adamu	(Austria)	FW	6 June 2001 (age 25)	Academy	2020	2025	1	0
23	Philipp Köhn	(Switzerland)	GK	2 April 1998 (age 28)	RB Leipzig	2019		0	0
31	Carlos Miguel	(Brazil)	GK	29 December 1996 (age 29)	Academy	2017		11	0
37	Masaya Okugawa	(Japan)	MF	14 April 1996 (age 30)	Kyoto Sanga	2015		46	14
44	Youba Diarra	(Mali)	MF	7 September 1998 (age 28)	Yeelen Olympique	2018		0	0
	Daniel Antosch	(Austria)	GK	7 March 2000 (age 26)	Academy	2018		0	0
	Darko Todorović	(Bosnia and Herzegovina)	DF	5 May 1997 (age 29)	Sloboda Tuzla	2018		14	0
	Lucho	(Colombia)	DF	3 January 2003 (age 23)	AAF Popayán	2021	2025	0	0
	Kilian Ludewig	(Germany)	DF	5 March 2000 (age 26)	Academy	2018		0	0
	Gideon Mensah	(Ghana)	DF	18 July 1998 (age 28)	West African Football Academy	2016	2024	0	0
	Csaba Bukta	(Hungary)	MF	25 July 2001 (age 25)	Debreceni	2017		0	0
	Samson Tijani	(Nigeria)	MF	17 May 2002 (age 24)	Collins Edwin	2020	2025	0	0
	Peter Pokorný	(Slovakia)	MF	8 August 2001 (age 25)	AS Trenčín	2018		0	0
	Samuel Tetteh	(Ghana)	FW	28 July 1996 (age 30)	West African Football Academy	2016	2022	0	0
	Daniel Owusu	(Ghana)	FW	25 January 2003 (age 23)	WAFA	2021	2025	0	0
Left during the season
14	Dominik Szoboszlai	(Hungary)	MF	25 October 2000 (age 26)	Academy	2017		82	25

=== Out on loan ===
Note: Flags indicate national team as defined under FIFA eligibility rules; some limited exceptions apply. Players may hold more than one non-FIFA nationality.

No.	Pos.	Nation	Player
3	DF	SUI	Jasper van der Werff (at Basel)
4	MF	GHA	Majeed Ashimeru (at Anderlecht)
6	DF	CMR	Jérôme Onguéné (at Genoa)
9	FW	AUT	Chukwubuike Adamu (at St.Gallen)
23	GK	SUI	Philipp Köhn (at Wil)
31	GK	BRA	Carlos Miguel (at New York Red Bulls)
37	MF	JPN	Masaya Okugawa (at Arminia Bielefeld)
44	MF	MLI	Youba Diarra (at New York Red Bulls)
—	GK	AUT	Daniel Antosch (at SV Horn)

No.	Pos.	Nation	Player
—	DF	BIH	Darko Todorović (at Hajduk Split)
—	DF	COL	Lucho (at SV Horn)
—	DF	GER	Kilian Ludewig (at Schalke)
—	DF	GHA	Gideon Mensah (at Vitória de Guimarães)
—	MF	HUN	Csaba Bukta (at Rheindorf Altach)
—	MF	NGR	Samson Tijani (at TSV Hartberg)
—	MF	SVK	Peter Pokorný (at SKN St. Pölten)
—	FW	GHA	Daniel Owusu (at SV Horn)
—	FW	GHA	Samuel Tetteh (at SKN St. Pölten)

== Coaching staff ==
Position	Name
Manager	(United States) Jesse Marsch
Assistant manager	(Austria) René Aufhauser
Assistant manager	(Austria) Franz Schiemer
Goalkeeper coach	(Austria) Herbert Ilsanker
Chief analyst	(Germany) Alexander Schmalhofer
Athletic coach	(Austria) Sebastian Kirchner
Rehab coach	(Germany) Ralf Neumann
Video analyst	(United States) Victor Bertini

== Kits ==
Third and Away (Europe)	Home (Europe)

== Transfers ==
=== In ===
Date	Position	Nationality	Name	From	Fee	Ref.
13 July 2020	FW	(Switzerland)	Federico Crescenti	St. Gallen	Undisclosed	
19 July 2020	DF	(France)	Oumar Solet	Olympique Lyonnais	Undisclosed	
3 September 2020	MF	(Mali)	Mamadou Sangare	Yeelen Olympique	Undisclosed	
16 October 2020†	MF	(United States)	Brenden Aaronson	Philadelphia Union	Undisclosed	
4 January 2021	DF	(Mali)	Daouda Guindo	Guidars FC	Undisclosed	
4 January 2021	MF	(Mali)	Mamady Diambou	Guidars FC	Undisclosed	
4 January 2021	FW	(Mali)	Dorgeles Nene	Guidars FC	Undisclosed	
20 January 2021	DF	(Colombia)	Lucho	AAF Popayán	Undisclosed	
26 January 2021	DF	(Croatia)	Rocco Zikovic	NK Istra	Undisclosed	
28 January 2021	GK	(Germany)	Nico Mantl	SpVgg Unterhaching	Undisclosed	
1 February 2021††	DF	(Poland)	Kamil Piątkowski	Raków Częstochowa	Undisclosed	
8 February 2021	MF	(Ghana)	Forson Amankwah	WAFA	Undisclosed	
8 February 2021	FW	(Ghana)	Daniel Owusu	WAFA	Undisclosed	

† Aaronson's move was announced on the above date, but was not finalised until 1 January 2021.
†† Piątkowski's move was announced on the above date, but was not finalised until 1 July 2021.

=== Loans in ===
Start date	Position	Nationality	Name	From	End date	Ref.
19 January 2021	DF	(Brazil)	Bernardo	Brighton & Hove Albion	End of season	

=== Out ===
Date	Position	Nationality	Name	To	Fee	Ref.
8 July 2020	FW	(South Korea)	Hwang Hee-chan	RB Leipzig	Undisclosed	
27 July 2020	MF	(South Korea)	Kim Jung-min	Vitória de Guimarães	Undisclosed	
15 August 2020	FW	(Austria)	Alexander Schmidt	LASK	Undisclosed	
31 August 2020	FW	(Bosnia and Herzegovina)	Smail Prevljak	KAS Eupen	Undisclosed	
1 September 2020	DF	(Austria)	Luca Meisl	SV Ried	Undisclosed	
17 December 2020†	MF	(Hungary)	Dominik Szoboszlai	RB Leipzig	Undisclosed	

† Szoboszlai's move was announced on the above date, but was not finalised until 1 January 2021.

=== Loans out ===
Start date	Position	Nationality	Name	To	End date	Ref.
9 January 2020	DF	(Switzerland)	Jasper van der Werff	Basel	End of 2020/21 Season	
29 July 2020	GK	(Switzerland)	Philipp Köhn	FC Wil	End of season	
11 August 2020	FW	(Ghana)	Samuel Tetteh	New York Red Bulls	31 December 2020	
12 August 2020	DF	(Bosnia and Herzegovina)	Darko Todorović	Hajduk Split	End of season	
13 August 2020	MF	(Nigeria)	Samson Tijani	TSV Hartberg	End of season	
17 August 2020	DF	(Germany)	Kilian Ludewig	Barnsley	5 October 2020	
26 August 2020	MF	(Slovakia)	Peter Pokorný	SKN St. Pölten	End of season	
1 September 2020	DF	(Ghana)	Gideon Mensah	Vitória de Guimarães	End of season	
5 October 2020	DF	(Germany)	Kilian Ludewig	Schalke 04	End of season	
13 January 2021	MF	(Ghana)	Majeed Ashimeru	RSC Anderlecht	End of season	
15 January 2021	DF	(Cameroon)	Jérôme Onguéné	Genoa	End of season	
18 January 2021	MF	(Hungary)	Csaba Bukta	Rheindorf Altach	End of season	
19 January 2021	FW	(Ghana)	Samuel Tetteh	SKN St. Pölten	End of season	
21 January 2021	DF	(Colombia)	Lucho	SV Horn	End of season	
28 January 2021	GK	(Austria)	Daniel Antosch	SV Horn	End of season	
31 January 2021	MF	(Japan)	Masaya Okugawa	Arminia Bielefeld	End of season	
8 February 2021	FW	(Ghana)	Daniel Owusu	SV Horn	End of season	
15 February 2021	FW	(Austria)	Chukwubuike Adamu	St.Gallen	End of season	
26 February 2021	GK	(Brazil)	Carlos Miguel	New York Red Bulls	31 December 2021	
1 March 2021	MF	(Mali)	Youba Diarra	New York Red Bulls	31 December 2021	

=== Released ===
Date	Position	Nationality	Name	Joined	Date	Ref.
10 July 2020	DF	(France)	Abdourahmane Barry	SpVgg Greuther Fürth	19 August 2020	

== Friendlies ==
3 August 2020	Red Bull Salzburg	2–2	NK Bravo	Bramberg am Wildkogel
17:00 CEST (UTC+02:00)	Szoboszlai 18'; Adeyemi 48'	Report	Žinko 4', 78'	Stadium: Sportplatz Bramberg

8 August 2020	Red Bull Salzburg	4–1	Nice	Zell am See
16:00 CEST (UTC+02:00)	Koïta 49'; Junuzović 54'; Berisha 59', 62'; Bernède (yellow card) 72'	Report	Gouiri 6'; Atal (yellow card) 55'	Stadium: Stadio Alois Latini; Attendance: 0

14 August 2020	Red Bull Salzburg	2–6	Red Bull Salzburg (UEFA Youth League team)	Salzburg
16:00 CEST (UTC+02:00)				Stadium: Red Bull Football Academy; Attendance: 0

14 August 2020	Red Bull Salzburg	2–0	Dynamo České Budějovice	Salzburg
18:00 CEST (UTC+02:00)	Koïta 1'; Daka 76'	Report		Stadium: Red Bull Football Academy; Attendance: 0

22 August 2020	Red Bull Salzburg	1–4	Ajax	Wals-Siezenheim
16:00 CEST (UTC+02:00)	Koïta 9' (pen.), (yellow card) 70'	Report	Gravenberch 2'; Antony 16'; Van de Beek 67'; Rensch 82'	Stadium: Stadion Wals-Siezenheim; Attendance: 0

25 August 2020	Red Bull Salzburg	2–2	Liverpool	Wals-Siezenheim
15:00 CEST (UTC+02:00)	Daka 3', 13' (yellow card) 45'; Onguéné (yellow card) 26'	Report	Brewster 72', 81'	Stadium: Stadion Wals-Siezenheim; Attendance: 0

4 September 2020	Türkgücü München	0–3	Red Bull Salzburg	Würzburg, Germany
14:00 CEST (UTC+02:00)		Report	Mwepu 5'; Adeyemi 13'; Daka 36'	Stadium: flyeralarm Arena; Attendance: 0
Note: Match played behind closed doors.

9 January 2021	Red Bull Salzburg	v	Górnik Zabrze	Salzburg
--:-- CET (UTC+01:00)				Stadium: Red Bull Football Academy
Note: Match cancelled on 9 January 2021 due to positive COVID-19 cases within the Górnik Zabrze squad.

16 January 2021	Red Bull Salzburg	6–0	Vorwärts Steyr	Salzburg
11:30 CET (UTC+01:00)	Daka 22', 66', 85'; Kristensen 69', 71'; Aaronsen 52'	Report		Stadium: Red Bull Football Academy; Attendance: 0 Referee: Christopher Jäger

16 January 2021	Red Bull Salzburg	1–3	SKU Amstetten	Salzburg
14:30 CET (UTC+01:00)	Adeyemi 44'	Report	Rogelj 24'; Frederiksen 55', 86'	Stadium: Red Bull Football Academy; Attendance: 0 Referee: Sebastian Gishamer

== Competitions ==
=== Overview ===
Competition	First match	Last match	Starting round	Final position	Record							
Competition	First match	Last match	Starting round	Final position	Pld	W	D	L	GF	GA	GD	Win %
Bundesliga	13 September 2020	22 May 2021	Matchday 1	Winners	32	25	2	5	94	33	+61	78.13
Austrian Cup	9 September 2020	1 May 2021	First round	Winners	6	6	0	0	28	2	+26	100.00
Champions League	22 September 2020	9 December 2020	Play-off round	Group stage	8	3	1	4	15	19	−4	37.50
Europa League	18 February 2021	25 February 2021	Round of 32	Round of 32	2	0	0	2	1	4	−3	0.00
Total					48	34	3	11	138	58	+80	70.83

Last updated: 22 May 2021
Source: Soccerway

=== Bundesliga ===
==== Regular stage ====
===== League table =====
Pos	Team	Pld	W	D	L	GF	GA	GD	Pts	Qualification
1	Red Bull Salzburg	22	17	1	4	67	24	+43	52	Qualification for the Championship round
2	Rapid Wien	22	13	6	3	43	25	+18	45	Qualification for the Championship round
3	LASK	22	13	3	6	42	21	+21	42	Qualification for the Championship round
4	Sturm Graz	22	11	6	5	34	20	+14	39	Qualification for the Championship round
5	Wolfsberger AC	22	10	3	9	40	39	+1	33	Qualification for the Championship round

Source: Austrian Football Bundesliga
Rules for classification: 1) Points; 2) Goal difference; 3) Goals scored; 4) Matches won; 5) Away matches won; 6) Head-to-head points; 7) Head-to-head goal difference; 8) Head-to-head goals scored.

===== Results summary =====
Overall								Home						Away					
Pld	W	D	L	GF	GA	GD	Pts	W	D	L	GF	GA	GD	W	D	L	GF	GA	GD
22	17	1	4	67	24	+43	52	9	0	2	39	14	+25	8	1	2	28	10	+18

Last updated: 20 March 2021.
Source: See Results

===== Results by round =====
Round	1	2	3	4	5	6	7	8	9	10	11	12	13	14	15	16	17	18	19	20	21	22
Ground	A	H	A	H	A	H	A	H	A	A	H	H	A	H	A	H	A	H	A	H	H	A
Result	W	W	W	W	W	W	D	L	W	L	W	L	W	W	W	W	W	W	L	W	W	W
Position	2	1	1	1	1	1	1	1	1	2	1	1	1	1	1	1	1	1	1	1	1	1

Updated to match(es) played on 20 March 2021. Source: See Results
A = Away; H = Home; W = Win; D = Draw; L = Loss

===== Results =====
13 September 2020 1	Wolfsberger AC	1–3	Red Bull Salzburg	Wolfsberg
17:00 CEST (UTC+02:00)	Lochoshvili (red card) 16'; Scherzer (yellow card) 33'; Rnić (yellow card) 88'; Vizinger 90+3'	Report	Peretz 21' (o.g.); Daka 27'; Ashimeru (yellow card) 75'; Koïta 82'	Stadium: Lavanttal-Arena; Referee: Markus Hameter

19 September 2020 2	Red Bull Salzburg	4–1	Rheindorf Altach	Wals-Siezenheim
17:00 CEST (UTC+02:00)	Ramalho (red card) 6'; Vallci (yellow card) 24'; Szoboszlai 36' (pen.); Daka 41'; Koïta 46'; Kristensen 63'	Report	Wiss (yellow card) 25'; Tartarotti 33'; Zwischenbrugger (yellow card) 34'; Netzer (yellow card) 72'; Fischer (yellow card) 82'	Stadium: Stadion Wals-Siezenheim; Referee: Manuel Schüttengruber

26 September 2020 3	SV Ried	1–3	Red Bull Salzburg	Ried im Innkreis
17:00 CEST (UTC+02:00)	Wießmeier 83'	Report	Berisha 45+1', 53'; Camara (yellow card) 47'; Kristensen (yellow card) 90+1'; Daka 90+7'	Stadium: Keine Sorgen Arena; Referee: Felix Ouschan

4 October 2020 4	Red Bull Salzburg	7–1	TSV Hartberg	Wals-Siezenheim
14:30 CEST (UTC+02:00)	Onguéné 15'; Vallci 26'; Koïta 47', 90+2'; Daka 70', 79'; Okafor 88' (pen.)	Report	Gollner (yellow card) 21'; Rakowitz 84'	Stadium: Stadion Wals-Siezenheim; Referee: Andreas Heiss

24 October 2020 5	Austria Wien	0–2	Red Bull Salzburg	Vienna
17:00 CEST (UTC+02:00)		Report	Farkas (yellow card) 38'; Okafor (yellow card) 45+1'; Berisha 62'; Daka 90+1'	Stadium: Generali Arena; Referee: Walter Altmann

31 October 2020 6	Red Bull Salzburg	5–0	Swarovski Tirol	Wals-Siezenheim
17:00 CET (UTC+01:00)	Okafor 3', 34', 57'; Farkas (yellow card) 7'; Koïta 74', 83' (pen.); Camara (yellow card) 75'	Report	Gugganig (yellow card) 36'; Pranter (yellow card) 66'	Stadium: Stadion Wals-Siezenheim; Referee: Christian-Petru Ciochirca

8 November 2020 7	Rapid Wien	1–1	Red Bull Salzburg	Vienna
17:00 CET (UTC+01:00)	Hofmann (yellow card) 16'; Greiml (yellow card) 45+2'; Knasmüllner 85'	Report	Koïta 29'; Okafor (yellow card) 34'; Ashimeru (yellow card) 88'; Vallci (yellow card) 90'	Stadium: Allianz Stadion; Referee: Oliver Drachta

21 November 2020 8	Red Bull Salzburg	1–3	Sturm Graz	Wals-Siezenheim
17:00 CET (UTC+01:00)	Camara (yellow card) 65'; Berisha 86'	Report	Ljubic 48' (yellow card) 90'; Jantscher 53', 59'; Stanković (yellow card) 65'; Hierländer (yellow card) 90+1'	Stadium: Stadion Wals-Siezenheim; Referee: Josef Spurny

28 November 2020 9	SKN St. Pölten	2–8	Red Bull Salzburg	Sankt Pölten
17:00 CET (UTC+01:00)	Ljubičić (yellow card) 11'; Muhamedbegovic (yellow card) 31'; Hugi 33'; Schmidt (yellow card) 43' (goal) 60'; Schütz (yellow card) 79'	Report	Berisha 7'; Szoboszlai 13' (pen.), 25' (pen.), 52'; Adeyemi 22'; Koïta 70', 86', 89'	Stadium: NV Arena; Referee: Manuel Schüttengruber

5 December 2020 10	Admira Wacker	1–0	Red Bull Salzburg	Maria Enzersdorf
17:00 CET (UTC+01:00)	Malicsek (yellow card) 2'; Kerschbaum (yellow card) 26' (goal) 69'; Hjulmand (yellow card) 35'; Aiwu (yellow card) 67'; Ganda (yellow card) 90+1'	Report	Vallci (yellow card) 23'; Camara (yellow card) 49'	Stadium: BSFZ-Arena; Referee: Gerhard Grobelnik

13 December 2020 11	Red Bull Salzburg	3–1	LASK	Wals-Siezenheim
17:00 CET (UTC+01:00)	Ramalho (yellow card) 23'; Daka 54'; Berisha 62'; Camara (yellow card) 70'; Vallci (yellow card) 82'; Mwepu 90+3'	Report	Wiesinger (yellow card) 16'; Eggestein 28'; Gruber (yellow card) 49'; Michorl (yellow card) 63'; Madsen (yellow card) 78'; Goiginger (yellow card) 84'	Stadium: Stadion Wals-Siezenheim; Referee: Harald Lechner

20 December 2020 12	Red Bull Salzburg	2–3	Wolfsberger AC	Wals-Siezenheim
14:30 CET (UTC+01:00)	Berisha 64'; Mwepu (yellow card) 68'; Daka 69'	Report	Scherzer 50' (yellow card) 61'; Joveljić 52'; Peretz (yellow card) 75' (goal) 79'	Stadium: Stadion Wals-Siezenheim; Referee: Julian Weinberger

24 January 2021 13	Rheindorf Altach	0–2	Red Bull Salzburg	Altach
14:30 CET (UTC+01:00)	Thurnwald (yellow card) 35'; Maderner (yellow card) 47'; Haudum (yellow card) 64' (yellow-red card) 80'; Karic (yellow card) 90+1'	Report	Zwischenbrugger 48' (o.g.); Daka 63'	Stadium: Stadion Schnabelholz; Referee: Walter Altmann

27 January 2021 14	Red Bull Salzburg	3–0	SV Ried	Wals-Siezenheim
18:30 CET (UTC+01:00)	Kristensen 15'; Koïta 29', (yellow card) 75'; Daka 45'	Report	Reiner (yellow card) 70'	Stadium: Stadion Wals-Siezenheim; Referee: Andreas Heiß

30 January 2021 15	TSV Hartberg	0–3	Red Bull Salzburg	Hartberg
17:00 CET (UTC+01:00)	Nimaga (yellow card) 18'	Report	Koïta 14' (pen.), (yellow card) 24'; Daka 35'; Mwepu 79'	Stadium: Profertil Arena Hartberg; Referee: Markus Hameter

10 February 2021 16	Red Bull Salzburg	3–1	Austria Wien	Wals-Siezenheim
20:30 CET (UTC+01:00)	Okafor (yellow card) 26'; Koïta (yellow card) 28', (goal) 65'; Camara (yellow card) 70'; Aaronson 72'; Adeyemi (yellow card) 86'; Ulmer (yellow card) 90+2'; Sučić 90+4'	Report	Teigl 59', (yellow card) 86'; Martel (yellow card) 84'	Stadium: Stadion Wals-Siezenheim; Referee: Dieter Muckenhammer

13 February 2021 17	Swarovski Tirol	2–4	Red Bull Salzburg	Innsbruck
17:00 CET (UTC+01:00)	Koch 10'; Rieder (yellow card) 52'; Celic (yellow card) 63'; Frederiksen 78' (pen.)	Report	Daka 31', 89'; Berisha 79'; Camara (yellow card) 85'; Koïta 90'	Stadium: Tivoli Stadion Tirol; Referee: Christian-Petru Ciochirca

21 February 2021 18	Red Bull Salzburg	4–2	Rapid Wien	Wals-Siezenheim
17:00 CET (UTC+01:00)	Daka (yellow card) 3', (goal) 30', 63', 70'; Adeyemi 90+2'	Report	Petrovič (yellow card) 14'; Schuster 90+1'; Kara 90+4'	Stadium: Stadion Wals-Siezenheim; Referee: Alexander Harkam

28 February 2021 19	Sturm Graz	2–1	Red Bull Salzburg	Graz
17:00 CET (UTC+01:00)	Jäger 9'; Ljubic 22'; Yeboah (yellow card) 41'	Report	Vallci (yellow card) 15'; Daka 78' (pen.); Seiwald (yellow card) 90+3'	Stadium: Merkur-Arena; Referee: Oliver Drachta

7 March 2021 20	Red Bull Salzburg	4–1	SKN St. Pölten	Wals-Siezenheim
14:30 CET (UTC+01:00)	Daka 18', (yellow card) 48'; Ramalho (yellow card) 22'; Mwepu 33'; Aaronson 69'; Berisha 90+4' (pen.)	Report	Booth 12'; Pokorný (yellow card) 15'; Ljubičić (yellow card) 54'	Stadium: Stadion Wals-Siezenheim; Referee: Harald Lechner

13 March 2021 21	Red Bull Salzburg	3–1	Admira Wacker	Wals-Siezenheim
17:00 CET (UTC+01:00)	Bernède 13'; Kristensen 23'; Daka 30'	Report	Ganda (yellow card) 15'; Datković 60'; Kerschbaum (yellow card) 79'	Stadium: Stadion Wals-Siezenheim; Referee: Christian-Petru Ciochirca

20 March 2021 22	LASK	0–1	Red Bull Salzburg	Pasching
17:00 CET (UTC+01:00)	Holland (yellow card) 47'	Report	Daka 13'; Ramalho (yellow card) 90+4'	Stadium: Raiffeisen Arena; Referee: Markus Hameter

==== Championship stage ====
===== Results summary =====
Overall								Home						Away					
Pld	W	D	L	GF	GA	GD	Pts	W	D	L	GF	GA	GD	W	D	L	GF	GA	GD
10	8	1	1	27	9	+18	25	4	1	0	12	2	+10	4	0	1	15	7	+8

Last updated: 22 May 2021.
Source: See Results

===== Results by round =====
Round	1	2	3	4	5	6	7	8	9	10
Ground	H	A	H	A	A	H	A	H	A	H
Result	W	W	W	L	W	D	W	W	W	W
Position	1	1	1	1	1	1	1	1	1	1

Updated to match(es) played on 22 May 2021. Source: See results
A = Away; H = Home; W = Win; D = Draw; L = Loss

===== Results =====
4 April 2021 1	Red Bull Salzburg	3–1	Sturm Graz	Wals-Siezenheim
17:00 CEST (UTC+02:00)	Daka 3', 5', 11', (penalty missed) 69'; Berisha (yellow card) 34'; Wöber (yellow card) 37'; Junuzović (yellow card) 48'; Bernardo (yellow card) 90'	Report	Dante 13'; Jantscher (yellow card) 38'; Jäger (yellow card) 69'; Friesenbichler (yellow card) 90+1'	Stadium: Stadion Wals-Siezenheim; Referee: Julian Weinberger

11 April 2021 2	Rapid Wien	0–3	Red Bull Salzburg	Vienna
17:00 CEST (UTC+02:00)	Hofmann (red card) 46'; Petrovič (yellow card) 82'	Report	Ramalho 36'; Ulmer (yellow card) 45+5'; Adeyemi 90+3', 90+5'	Stadium: Allianz Stadion; Referee: Manuel Schüttengruber

18 April 2021 3	Red Bull Salzburg	2–0	LASK	Wals-Siezenheim
14:30 CEST (UTC+02:00)	Berisha 87'; Okafor 90+3'	Report	Michorl (yellow card) 20'; Andrade (yellow card) 20'; Ranftl (yellow card) 29'; Renner (yellow card) 80'	Stadium: Stadion Wals-Siezenheim; Referee: Alexander Harkam

21 April 2021 4	Swarovski Tirol	3–2	Red Bull Salzburg	Innsbruck
18:30 CEST (UTC+02:00)	Frederiksen 29', 76'; Pranter (yellow card) 32'; Gugganig (yellow card) 71'; Smith 89'	Report	Mwepu 12', (yellow card) 66'; Bernardo (yellow card) 19'; Aaronson 58'	Stadium: Tivoli Stadion Tirol; Referee: Stefan Ebner

25 April 2021 5	Wolfsberger AC	1–2	Red Bull Salzburg	Wolfsberg
14:30 CEST (UTC+02:00)	Joveljić 29'	Report	Daka 13', (yellow card) 41'; Berisha 48'; Bernède (red card) 72'; Junuzović (yellow card) 78'	Stadium: Lavanttal-Arena; Referee: Harald Lechner

28 April 2021 6	Red Bull Salzburg	1–1	Wolfsberger AC	Wals-Siezenheim
18:30 CEST (UTC+02:00)	Mwepu (yellow card) 64'; Adeyemi 86'	Report	Leitgeb (yellow card) 23'; Affengruber 68' (o.g.)	Stadium: Stadion Wals-Siezenheim; Referee: Dieter Muckenhammer

9 May 2021 7	Sturm Graz	1–3	Red Bull Salzburg	Graz
14:30 CEST (UTC+02:00)	Stanković (yellow card) 46'; Kiteishvili 56'	Report	Aaronson 20', 78'; Junuzović 83'; Adeyemi (yellow card) 90+6'	Stadium: Merkur-Arena; Referee: Gerhard Grobelnik

12 May 2021 8	Red Bull Salzburg	2–0	Rapid Wien	Wals-Siezenheim
20:30 CEST (UTC+02:00)	Daka 32', 56'	Report	Grahovac (yellow card) 30'; Greiml (yellow card) 50'; Hofmann (yellow card) 80' (yellow-red card) 87'	Stadium: Stadion Wals-Siezenheim; Referee: Markus Hameter

16 May 2021 9	LASK	2–5	Red Bull Salzburg	Pasching
17:00 CEST (UTC+02:00)	Eggestein 19', (penalty missed) 71'; Michorl (yellow card) 26'; Reiter 84'	Report	Mwepu 20'; Okafor 21'; Daka 44'; Bernède (yellow card) 65' (yellow-red card) 74'; Adeyemi 67', 71'; Kristensen (yellow card) 70'	Stadium: Raiffeisen Arena; Referee: Harald Lechner

22 May 2021 10	Red Bull Salzburg	4–0	Swarovski Tirol	Wals-Siezenheim
17:00 CEST (UTC+02:00)	Bernardo 8', (yellow card) 87'; Berisha 26', 43' (pen.), 66'	Report	Gugganig (yellow card) 15'; Rogelj (yellow card) 38'	Stadium: Stadion Wals-Siezenheim; Referee: Christian-Petru Ciochirca

===== League table =====
Pos	Team	Pld	W	D	L	GF	GA	GD	Pts	Qualification
1	Red Bull Salzburg (C)	32	25	2	5	94	33	+61	51	Qualification for the Champions League play-off round
2	Rapid Wien	32	17	8	7	64	40	+24	36	Qualification for the Champions League second qualifying round
3	Sturm Graz	32	16	8	8	52	34	+18	36	Qualification for the Europa League play-off round
4	LASK	32	15	6	11	55	41	+14	30	Qualification for the Europa Conference League third qualifying round
5	Wolfsberger AC	32	13	5	14	52	62	−10	27	Qualification for the Europa Conference League play-off final

Rules for classification: 1) Points; 2) Points with (possible) half points subtracted due to rounding; 3) Goal difference; 4) Goals scored; 5) Matches won; 6) Away matches won; 7) Head-to-head points; 8) Head-to-head goal difference; 9) Head-to-head goals scored.
(C) Champions

=== Austrian Cup ===
9 September 2020 First round	Bregenz	0–10	Red Bull Salzburg	Bregenz
20:25 CEST (UTC+02:00)		Report	Koïta 13'; Daka 17' (pen.), 23', 38', 39'; Camara 28'; Mwepu 34'; Sučić 43' (pen.); Okugawa 50'; Wöber 56'	Stadium: ImmoAgentur-Stadion; Referee: Walter Altmann
Note: Match originally scheduled for 29 August, but postponed on 28 August.

17 October 2020 Second round	SKN St. Pölten	0–3	Red Bull Salzburg	Sankt Pölten
14:45 CEST (UTC+02:00)	Steinwender (yellow card) 21'; Schulz (yellow card) 40'	Report	Vallci 22'; Mwepu (yellow card) 66', (goal) 77'; Ramalho 89'	Stadium: NV Arena; Referee: Julian Weinberger

16 December 2020 Third round	Red Bull Salzburg	6–2	Rapid Wien	Wals-Siezenheim
20:30 CET (UTC+01:00)	Szoboszlai 16'; Berisha 19'; Koita 23'; Wöber (yellow card) 47'; Mwepu (yellow card) 71'; Daka 74'; Camara 83' (pen.); Kristensen 87'	Report	Kara (yellow card) 37'; Knasmüllner (yellow card) 42'; Fountas 45+1' (pen.); Hofmann (yellow card) 48' (yellow-red card) 82'; Ullmann 78'	Stadium: Stadion Wals-Siezenheim; Referee: Walter Altmann

6 February 2021 Quarter-final	Red Bull Salzburg	2–0	Austria Wien	Wals-Siezenheim
17:00 CET (UTC+01:00)	Koïta 41'; Bernède (yellow card) 87'; Adeyemi 89', (yellow card) 90+2'	Report	Schösswendter (yellow card) 35'	Stadium: Stadion Wals-Siezenheim; Referee: Manuel Schüttengruber

3 March 2021 Semi-final	Sturm Graz	0–4	Red Bull Salzburg	Klagenfurt
21:05 CET (UTC+01:00)	Ingolitsch (yellow card) 25'; Stanković (yellow card) 44'; Yeboah (yellow card) 67'	Report	Bernède (yellow card) 33'; Mwepu 36', 54'; Berisha 72'; Aaronson 79'	Stadium: Wörthersee Stadion; Attendance: 0 Referee: Julian Weinberger

1 May 2021 Final	LASK	0–3	Red Bull Salzburg	Klagenfurt
20:30 CEST (UTC+02:00)	Trauner (yellow card) 43'; Holland (yellow card) 57'; Schlager (yellow card) 69'	Report	Berisha 45'; Aaronson 66'; Daka (penalty missed) 70'; Ulmer (yellow card) 70'; Wöber (yellow card) 82'; Mwepu 88'	Stadium: Wörthersee Stadion; Attendance: 0 Referee: Walter Altmann

=== UEFA Champions League ===
==== Qualifying rounds ====
22 September 2020 Playoff round 1st leg	Maccabi Tel Aviv (Israel)	1–2	(Austria) Red Bull Salzburg	Tel Aviv, Israel
21:00 CEST (UTC+02:00)	Biton 9'; Yeini (yellow card) 66'	Report	Szoboszlai 49' (pen.), (yellow card) 85'; Okugawa 57'	Stadium: Bloomfield Stadium; Attendance: 0 Referee: Michael Oliver (England)

30 September 2020 Playoff round 2nd leg	Red Bull Salzburg (Austria)	3–1 (5–2 agg.)	(Israel) Maccabi Tel Aviv	Wals-Siezenheim, Austria
21:00 CEST (UTC+02:00)	Daka 16', 68'; Camara (yellow card) 38'; Szoboszlai 45+4' (pen.); Ramalho (yellow card) 87'; Okafor (yellow card) 90+2'	Report	Karzev 30', (yellow card) 44'; Baltaxa (yellow card) 45+3'	Stadium: Stadion Wals-Siezenheim; Attendance: 0 Referee: Felix Brych (Germany)

==== Group stage ====
Pos	Team	Pld	W	D	L	GF	GA	GD	Pts	Qualification
1	(Germany) Bayern Munich	6	5	1	0	18	5	+13	16	Advance to knockout phase
2	(Spain) Atlético Madrid	6	2	3	1	7	8	−1	9	Advance to knockout phase
3	(Austria) Red Bull Salzburg	6	1	1	4	10	17	−7	4	Transfer to Europa League
4	(Russia) Lokomotiv Moscow	6	0	3	3	5	10	−5	3	

Source: UEFA
Rules for classification: Group stage tiebreakers

21 October 2020 1	Red Bull Salzburg (Austria)	2–2	(Russia) Lokomotiv Moscow	Wals-Siezenheim, Austria
18:55 CEST (UTC+02:00)	Szoboszlai (yellow card) 41', (goal) 45'; Junuzović 50'	Report	Eder 19'; Lisakovich 75'; Kulikov (yellow card) 80'	Stadium: Stadion Wals-Siezenheim; Attendance: 3,000; Referee: Serdar Gözübüyük (Netherlands)

27 October 2020 2	Atlético Madrid (Spain)	3–2	(Austria) Red Bull Salzburg	Madrid, Spain
21:00 CET (UTC+01:00)	Llorente 29', (yellow card) 64'; Félix 52', 85'	Report	Ramalho (yellow card) 13'; Wöber (yellow card) 23'; Szoboszlai 40'; Felipe 47' (o.g.)	Stadium: Metropolitano Stadium; Attendance: 0 Referee: Ovidiu Hațegan (Romania)
Note: Match played behind closed doors.

3 November 2020 3	Red Bull Salzburg (Austria)	2–6	(Germany) Bayern Munich	Wals-Siezenheim, Austria
21:00 CET (UTC+01:00)	Berisha 4'; Camara (yellow card) 53'; Okugawa 66'; Mwepu (yellow card) 85'	Report	Lewandowski 21' (pen.), 88'; Pavard (yellow card) 23'; Kristensen 44' (o.g.); Gnabry (yellow card) 68'; Boateng 79'; Sané 83'; Hernandez 90+2'	Stadium: Stadion Wals-Siezenheim; Attendance: 0 Referee: Danny Makkelie (Netherlands)
Note: Match played behind closed doors.

25 November 2020 4	Bayern Munich (Germany)	3–1	(Austria) Red Bull Salzburg	Munich, Germany
21:00 CET (UTC+01:00)	Neuer (yellow card) 24'; Lewandowski 43'; Roca (yellow card) 48' (yellow-red card) 66'; Coman 52'; Sané 68'	Report	Koïta (yellow card) 58'; Berisha 73'; Camara (yellow card) 90+5'	Stadium: Allianz Arena; Attendance: 0 Referee: Orel Grinfeld (Israel)
Note: Match played behind closed doors.

1 December 2020 5	Lokomotiv Moscow (Russia)	1–3	(Austria) Red Bull Salzburg	Moscow, Russia
18:55 CET (UTC+01:00)	Mukhin (yellow card) 62'; Miranchuk 79' (pen.); Ignatyev (yellow card) 79'; Cerqueira (yellow card) 80'	Report	Berisha 28', 41'; Camara (yellow card) 45+1'; Ramalho (yellow card) 80'; Stankovic (yellow card) 80'; Adeyemi 81'	Stadium: RZD Arena; Attendance: 6,759; Referee: Ali Palabıyık (Turkey)

9 December 2020 6	Red Bull Salzburg (Austria)	0–2	(Spain) Atlético Madrid	Wals-Siezenheim, Austria
21:00 CET (UTC+01:00)	Ramalho (yellow card) 71'	Report	Hermoso 39' (yellow card) 45+1'; Savić (yellow card) 61'; Carrasco 86'	Stadium: Stadion Wals-Siezenheim; Attendance: 0 Referee: Anthony Taylor (England)
Note: Match played behind closed doors.

=== UEFA Europa League ===
==== Knockout phase ====
18 February 2021 Round of 32 1st Leg	Red Bull Salzburg (Austria)	0–2	(Spain) Villarreal	Wals-Siezenheim, Austria
21:00 CET (UTC+01:00)	Kristensen (yellow card) 28'; Solet (yellow card) 40'; Okafor (yellow card) 89'; Ulmer (yellow card) 90+5'	Report	Alcácer (penalty missed) 29', 41'; Niño 71'; Albiol (yellow card) 90'	Stadium: Stadion Wals-Siezenheim; Attendance: 0 Referee: Andris Treimanis (Latvia)
Note: Match played behind closed doors due to the COVID-19 pandemic in Austria.

25 February 2021 Round of 32 2nd Leg	Villarreal (Spain)	2–1 (4–1 agg.)	(Austria) Red Bull Salzburg	Villarreal, Spain
18:55 CET (UTC+01:00)	Gerard 40', 89' (pen.); Costa (yellow card) 69'	Report	Berisha 17'; Vallci (yellow card) 20'; Mwepu (yellow card) 53'; Daka (yellow card) 55'; Adeyemi (yellow card) 80'	Stadium: Estadio de la Cerámica; Attendance: 0 Referee: Felix Zwayer (Germany)
Note: Match played behind closed doors due to the COVID-19 pandemic in Spain.

== Statistics ==
As of match played 22 May 2021

=== Appearances and goals ===
No.	Pos	Nat	Player	Total		Bundesliga		Austrian Cup		UEFA Champions League		UEFA Europa League	
No.	Pos	Nat	Player	Apps	Goals	Apps	Goals	Apps	Goals	Apps	Goals	Apps	Goals
1	GK	(Austria) AUT	Cican Stankovic	45	0	29	0	6	0	8	0	2	0
5	DF	(Austria) AUT	Albert Vallci	26	2	13+4	1	4+1	1	2	0	2	0
7	FW	(Mali) MLI	Sékou Koïta	29	17	8+9	14	4	3	6+2	0	0	0
8	FW	(Germany) GER	Mërgim Berisha	42	22	24+4	14	3+1	3	6+2	4	2	1
11	MF	(United States) USA	Brenden Aaronson	25	7	15+5	5	2+1	2	0	0	2	0
13	MF	(Austria) AUT	Nicolas Seiwald	18	0	5+10	0	0+3	0	0	0	0	0
14	MF	(Denmark) DEN	Maurits Kjaergaard	1	0	0+1	0	0	0	0	0	0	0
15	DF	(Brazil) BRA	André Ramalho	43	2	26+2	1	5+1	1	8	0	1	0
16	MF	(Austria) AUT	Zlatko Junuzović	39	2	19+6	1	5	0	6+1	1	2	0
17	DF	(Austria) AUT	Andreas Ulmer	44	0	24+6	0	4	0	8	0	2	0
19	MF	(Mali) MLI	Mohamed Camara	26	2	9+6	0	3+1	2	6+1	0	0	0
20	FW	(Zambia) ZAM	Patson Daka	42	34	21+7	27	5+1	5	5+1	2	2	0
21	MF	(Croatia) CRO	Luka Sučić	27	2	8+9	1	2+3	1	0+3	0	1+1	0
22	DF	(France) FRA	Oumar Solet	12	0	7+3	0	0	0	0	0	1+1	0
23	GK	(Germany) GER	Nico Mantl	2	0	2	0	0	0	0	0	0	0
25	DF	(Austria) AUT	Patrick Farkas	12	0	4+7	0	0+1	0	0	0	0	0
27	MF	(Germany) GER	Karim Adeyemi	38	9	11+18	7	0+4	1	0+3	1	0+2	0
28	MF	(France) FRA	Antoine Bernède	25	1	17+2	1	2+1	0	1	0	1+1	0
30	FW	(Slovenia) SLO	Benjamin Šeško	1	0	0+1	0	0	0	0	0	0	0
38	FW	(Czech Republic) CZE	Antonin Svoboda	1	0	0	0	0	0	0	0	0+1	0
39	DF	(Austria) AUT	Maximilian Wöber	35	1	20+1	0	5	1	8	0	0+1	0
42	FW	(Austria) AUT	David Affengruber	6	0	1+4	0	0+1	0	0	0	0	0
43	DF	(Denmark) DEN	Rasmus Kristensen	43	4	24+6	3	5	1	6	0	2	0
45	MF	(Zambia) ZAM	Enock Mwepu	45	10	22+7	5	6	5	8	0	2	0
70	DF	(Bosnia and Herzegovina) BIH	Amar Dedić	1	0	0	0	0+1	0	0	0	0	0
77	FW	(Switzerland) SUI	Noah Okafor	29	6	12+6	6	0+4	0	0+6	0	0+1	0
95	DF	(Brazil) BRA	Bernardo	15	1	5+9	1	0+1	0	0	0	0	0
Players also registered for Liefering :
Players away on loan :
4	MF	(Ghana) GHA	Majeed Ashimeru	13	0	5+4	0	0+2	0	0+2	0	0	0
6	DF	(Cameroon) CMR	Jérôme Onguéné	15	1	6+3	1	1+1	0	0+4	0	0	0
9	FW	(Austria) AUT	Chukwubuike Adamu	1	0	0	0	0+1	0	0	0	0	0
31	GK	(Brazil) BRA	Carlos Miguel	1	0	1	0	0	0	0	0	0	0
37	MF	(Japan) JPN	Masaya Okugawa	14	3	3+4	0	2	1	2+3	2	0	0
Players who left Red Bull Salzburg during the season:
14	MF	(Hungary) HUN	Dominik Szoboszlai	22	9	11+1	4	2	1	8	4	0	0

=== Goalscorers ===
Place	Position	Nation	Number	Name	Bundesliga	Austrian Cup	UEFA Champions League	UEFA Europa League	Total
1	FW	(Zambia)	20	Patson Daka	27	5	2	0	34
2	FW	(Germany)	8	Mërgim Berisha	14	3	4	1	22
3	FW	(Mali)	7	Sékou Koïta	14	3	0	0	17
4	MF	(Zambia)	45	Enock Mwepu	5	5	0	0	10
5	MF	(Germany)	27	Karim Adeyemi	7	1	1	0	9
5	MF	(Hungary)	14	Dominik Szoboszlai	4	1	4	0	9
7	MF	(United States)	11	Brenden Aaronson	5	2	0	0	7
8	FW	(Switzerland)	77	Noah Okafor	6	0	0	0	6
9	DF	(Denmark)	43	Rasmus Kristensen	3	1	0	0	4
10	MF	(Japan)	37	Masaya Okugawa	0	1	2	0	3
10				Own goal	2	0	1	0	3
12	DF	(Austria)	5	Albert Vallci	1	1	0	0	2
12	MF	(Croatia)	21	Luka Sučić	1	1	0	0	2
12	DF	(Brazil)	15	André Ramalho	1	1	0	0	2
12	MF	(Austria)	16	Zlatko Junuzović	1	0	1	0	2
12	MF	(Mali)	19	Mohamed Camara	0	2	0	0	2
17	DF	(Cameroon)	6	Jérôme Onguéné	1	0	0	0	1
17	MF	(France)	28	Antoine Bernède	1	0	0	0	1
17	DF	(Brazil)	95	Bernardo	1	0	0	0	1
17	DF	(Austria)	39	Maximilian Wöber	0	1	0	0	1
				TOTALS	91	28	15	1	135

=== Clean sheets ===
Place	Position	Nation	Number	Name	Bundesliga	Austrian Cup	UEFA Champions League	UEFA Europa League	Total
1	GK	(Austria)	1	Cican Stankovic	10	5	0	0	15
2	GK	(Brazil)	31	Carlos Miguel	1	0	0	0	1
2	GK	(Germany)	23	Nico Mantl	1	0	0	0	1
				TOTALS	12	5	0	0	17

=== Disciplinary record ===
Number	Nation	Position	Name	Bundesliga		Austrian Cup		UEFA Champions League		UEFA Europa League		Total	
Number	Nation	Position	Name	Yellow card	Red card	Yellow card	Red card	Yellow card	Red card	Yellow card	Red card	Yellow card	Red card
1	(Austria)	GK	Cican Stankovic	0	0	0	0	1	0	0	0	1	0
5	(Austria)	DF	Albert Vallci	5	0	0	0	0	0	1	0	6	0
7	(Mali)	FW	Sékou Koïta	3	0	0	0	1	0	0	0	4	0
8	(Germany)	FW	Mërgim Berisha	1	0	0	0	0	0	0	0	1	0
13	(Austria)	MF	Nicolas Seiwald	1	0	0	0	0	0	0	0	1	0
15	(Brazil)	DF	André Ramalho	3	1	0	0	4	0	0	0	7	1
16	(Austria)	MF	Zlatko Junuzović	2	0	0	0	0	0	0	0	2	0
17	(Austria)	DF	Andreas Ulmer	2	0	1	0	0	0	1	0	4	0
19	(Mali)	MF	Mohamed Camara	7	0	0	0	4	0	0	0	11	0
20	(Zambia)	FW	Patson Daka	3	0	0	0	0	0	1	0	4	0
22	(France)	DF	Oumar Solet	0	0	0	0	0	0	1	0	1	0
25	(Austria)	DF	Patrick Farkas	2	0	0	0	0	0	0	0	2	0
27	(Germany)	MF	Karim Adeyemi	2	0	1	0	0	0	1	0	4	0
28	(France)	MF	Antoine Bernède	2	2	2	0	0	0	0	0	4	2
39	(Austria)	DF	Maximilian Wöber	1	0	2	0	1	0	0	0	4	0
43	(Denmark)	DF	Rasmus Kristensen	2	0	0	0	0	0	1	0	3	0
45	(Zambia)	MF	Enock Mwepu	3	0	2	0	1	0	1	0	7	0
77	(Switzerland)	FW	Noah Okafor	3	0	0	0	1	0	1	0	5	0
95	(Brazil)	DF	Bernardo	3	0	0	0	0	0	0	0	3	0
Players away on loan:
4	(Ghana)	MF	Majeed Ashimeru	2	0	0	0	0	0	0	0	2	0
Players who left Red Bull Salzburg during the season:
14	(Hungary)	MF	Dominik Szoboszlai	0	0	0	0	2	0	0	0	2	0
			TOTALS	47	3	8	0	14	0	8	0	77	3
