= Mohamed Camara (footballer, born January 2000) =

Malian professional footballer

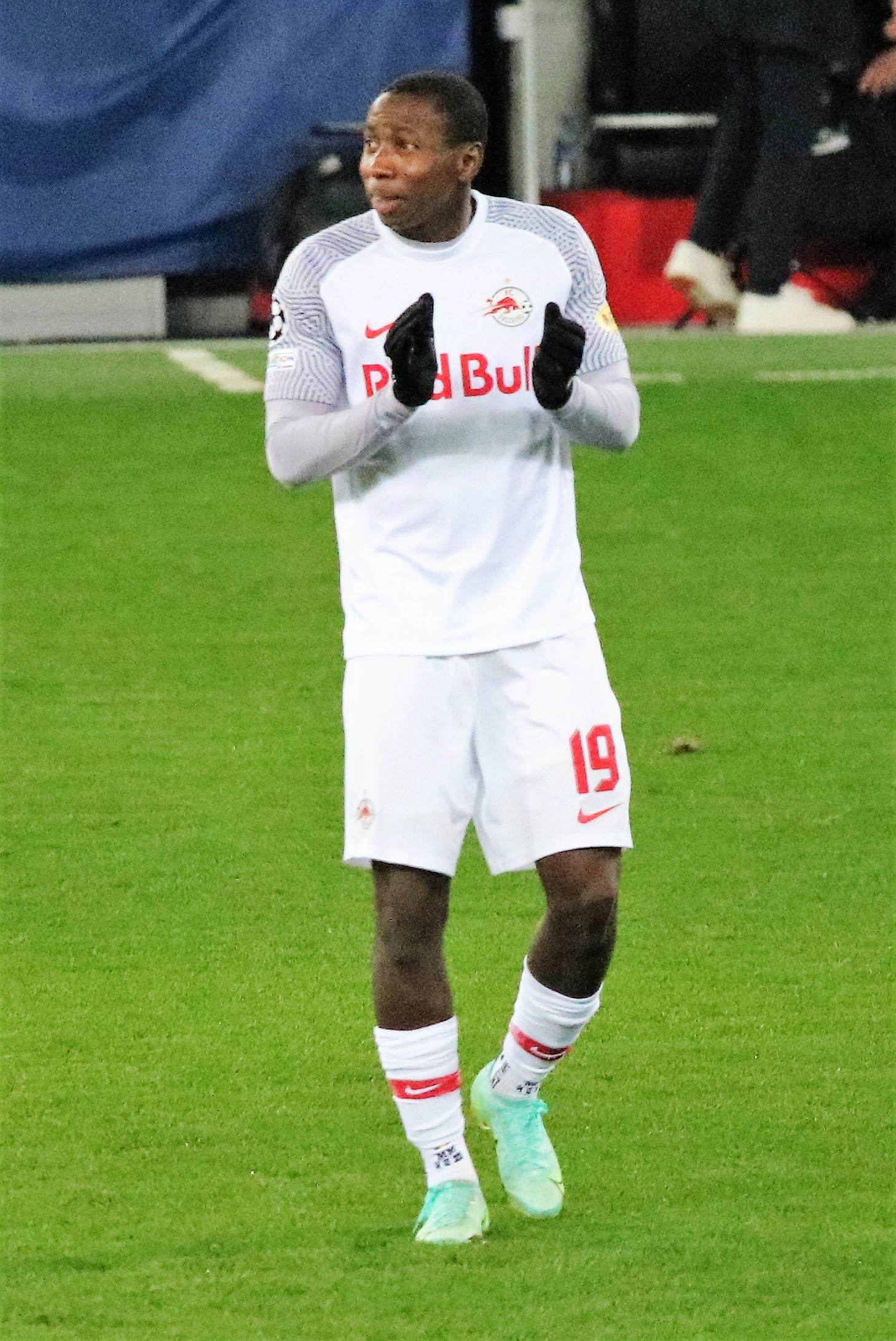
- Camara with Red Bull Salzburg in 2022

Personal information
- Full name: Mohamed Camara
- Date of birth: 6 January 2000 (age 26)
- Place of birth: Bamako, Mali
- Height: 1.74 m (5 ft 9 in)
- Position: Defensive midfielder

Team information
- Current team: Al Sadd
- Number: 4

Youth career
- –2017: Real Bamako

Senior career*
Years	Team	Apps	(Gls)
2017	Real Bamako		
2018–2019	FC Liefering	35	(4)
2019	→ TSV Hartberg (loan)	7	(0)
2019–2022	Red Bull Salzburg	53	(2)
2022–2024	Monaco	49	(1)
2024–	Al Sadd	24	(0)

International career^{‡}
2017	Mali U17	10	(1)
2019	Mali U20	5	(2)
2019	Mali U23	1	(0)
2019–	Mali	36	(3)
Medal record
Representing Mali
Men's football
Africa U-20 Cup of Nations
Winner	2019 Niger
Africa U-17 Cup of Nations
Winner	2017 Gabon
- * Club domestic league appearances and goals as of 22 November 2025 ‡ National team caps and goals as of 29 December 2025

Mohamed Camara (born 6 January 2000) is a Malian professional footballer who plays as a defensive midfielder for Qatar Stars League club Al Sadd and the Mali national team.

== Club career ==
Camara started his career at Real Bamako before joining Red Bull Salzburg on five-year deal in 2018.

On 8 January 2019, he was loaned to TSV Hartberg for the rest of the season.

On 18 February 2021, Camara was suspended for three months of all club and international football activities by UEFA, following a doping investigation conducted by UEFA in which Camara tested positive after taking an altitude sickness medicine prescribed by the Malian National Team Doctor.

On 14 August 2022, Monaco announced that Camara signed a five-year contract with the club.

On 30 July 2024, Camara signed a five-year contract with Qatari side Al Sadd.

== International career ==
Camara debuted for the Mali national team in a 2–1 friendly loss to South Africa on 13 October 2019.

In December 2021, Camara was selected by coach Mohamed Magassouba to participate in the 2021 Africa Cup of Nations.

On 2 January 2024, he was selected from the list of 27 Malian players selected by Éric Chelle to compete in the 2023 Africa Cup of Nations.

On 11 December 2025, Camara was called up to the Mali squad for the 2025 Africa Cup of Nations.

== Controversy ==
On 19 May 2024, the Ligue de Football Professionnel (LFP) celebrated the International Day Against Homophobia, Biphobia and Transphobia. During this event, Camara covered the campaign logo on his jersey, which featured the word 'Homophobie', with a red cross using two pieces of white tape. He also removed the LFP logo in rainbow colors on the sleeves with a black tape. Before the event, he refused to pose for the pre-match group photo in which the football players posed in front of the campaign logo. The French Minister of Equal Opportunities and French Sports Minister condemned his actions. The sports minister called his actions "unacceptable behavior" and asked for the "strongest sanctions" against Camara. In reference to his actions, the minister of equality tweeted, "Homophobia is not an opinion, it's a crime. And homophobia kills. There must be strict punishment for Mohamed Camara." The LFP summoned Camara for a disciplinary hearing. Monaco's general manager Thiago Scuro apologized and cited religious reasons for the actions of Camara, a Muslim. However, the Malian Football Federation issued a support letter for his actions, citing "fundamental rights". On 30 May 2024, the LFP suspended Camara for four matches.

== Career statistics ==
=== Club ===
As of match played 22 November 2025

Appearances and goals by club, season and competition
Club	Season	League			National cup (Note: Includes Austrian Cup, Coupe de France, Qatar Cup)		Continental		Other		Total	
Club	Season	Division	Apps	Goals	Apps	Goals	Apps	Goals	Apps	Goals	Apps	Goals
FC Liefering	2017–18	2. Liga	15	1	—		—		—		15	1
FC Liefering	2018–19	2. Liga	14	2	—		—		—		14	2
FC Liefering	2019–20	2. Liga	6	1	—		—		—		6	1
FC Liefering	Total		35	4	—		—		—		35	4
TSV Hartberg (loan)	2018–19	Austrian Bundesliga	7	0	0	0	—		—		7	0
Red Bull Salzburg	2019–20	Austrian Bundesliga	13	1	1	0	2 (Note: Appearances in UEFA Europa League)	0	—		16	1
Red Bull Salzburg	2020–21	Austrian Bundesliga	15	0	4	2	7 (Note: Appearances in UEFA Champions League)	0	—		26	2
Red Bull Salzburg	2021–22	Austrian Bundesliga	25	1	2	0	10	0	—		37	1
Red Bull Salzburg	Total		53	2	7	2	19	0	—		79	4
Monaco	2022–23	Ligue 1	29	0	0	0	8	0	—		37	0
Monaco	2023–24	Ligue 1	20	1	0	0	—		—		20	1
Monaco	Total		49	1	0	0	8	0	—		57	1
Al Sadd	2024–25	Qatar Stars League	17	0	2	0	10 (Note: Appearances in AFC Champions League Elite)	0	2 (Note: Appearances in Amir Cup)	0	31	0
Al Sadd	2025–26	Qatar Stars League	7	0	0	0	5	0	0	0	12	0
Al Sadd	Total		24	0	2	0	15	0	2	0	43	0
Career total			168	7	9	2	42	0	2	0	221	9

=== International ===
As of match played 29 December 2025

Appearances and goals by national team and year
National team	Year	Apps	Goals
Mali	2019	2	1
Mali	2020	2	0
Mali	2021	6	0
Mali	2022	6	2
Mali	2023	6	0
Mali	2024	9	0
Mali	2025	5	0
Total		36	3

Scores and results list Mali's goal tally first.

List of international goals scored by Mohamed Camara
No.	Date	Venue	Opponent	Score	Result	Competition
1.	17 November 2019	Stade Omnisports, N'Djamena, Chad	Chad	2–0	2–0	2021 Africa Cup of Nations qualification
2	4 June 2022	Stade du 26 Mars, Bamako, Mali	Congo	1–0	4–0	2023 Africa Cup of Nations qualification
3	9 June 2022	St. Mary's Stadium-Kitende, Entebbe, Uganda	South Sudan	1–1	3–1	2023 Africa Cup of Nations qualification

== Honours ==
Red Bull Salzburg

- Austrian Bundesliga: 2019–20, 2020–21, 2021–22
- Austrian Cup: 2019–20, 2020–21, 2021–22

Mali U17

- Africa U-17 Cup of Nations: 2017

Mali U20

- Africa U-20 Cup of Nations: 2019

=== Individual ===
- Austrian Bundesliga Team of the Year: 2021–22
