= Antoine Bernède =

French footballer (born 1999)

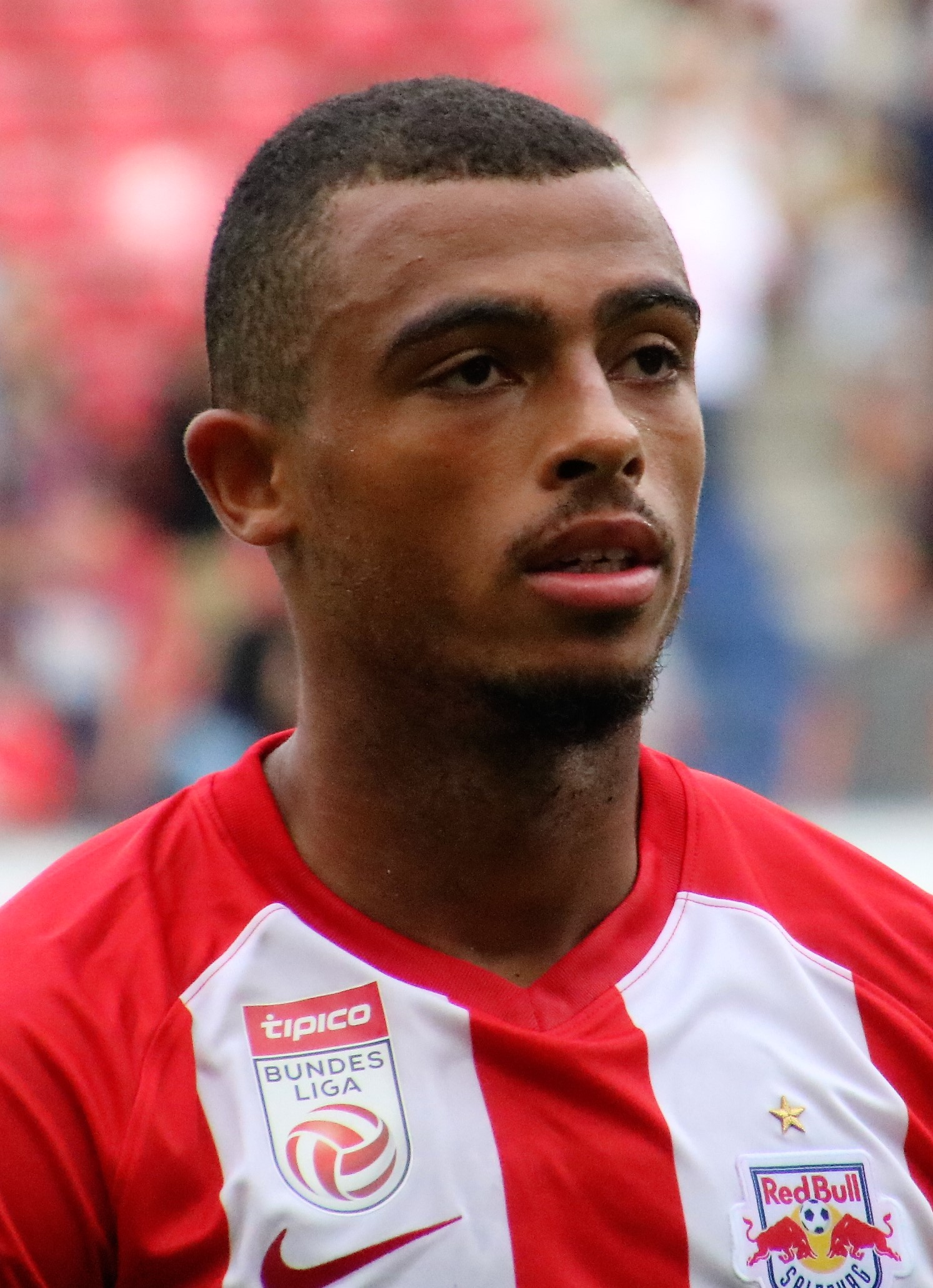
- Bernède with Red Bull Salzburg in 2019

Personal information
- Full name: Antoine Joseph Emmanuel Bernède
- Date of birth: 26 May 1999 (age 27)
- Place of birth: Paris, France
- Height: 1.77 m (5 ft 10 in)
- Position: Midfielder

Team information
- Current team: Hellas Verona
- Number: 24

Youth career
- 2007–2012: FC Solitaires Paris-Est
- 2012–2016: Paris Saint-Germain

Senior career*
Years	Team	Apps	(Gls)
2016–2019	Paris Saint-Germain B	30	(1)
2018–2019	Paris Saint-Germain	2	(0)
2019–2023	Red Bull Salzburg	51	(1)
2023	→ Lausanne-Sport (loan)	17	(1)
2023–2025	Lausanne-Sport	53	(2)
2025	→ Hellas Verona (loan)	14	(1)
2025–	Hellas Verona	32	(1)

International career
2014	France U16	2	(0)
2016	France U17	7	(1)
2016–2017	France U18	10	(2)
2017–2018	France U19	6	(1)
2018	France U20	2	(0)
2019	France U21	2	(0)
- * Club domestic league appearances and goals as of 25 May 2026

Antoine Joseph Emmanuel Bernède (born 26 May 1999) is a French professional footballer who plays as a midfielder for Serie B club Hellas Verona.

== Club career ==
=== Paris Saint-Germain ===
Bernède made his professional debut for Paris Saint-Germain on 4 August 2018 in the 2018 Trophée des Champions, coming on as a substitute in the 74th minute for Thiago Silva in the 4–0 win against Monaco.

=== Red Bull Salzburg ===
On 6 February 2019, Bernède signed with Austrian Bundesliga club Red Bull Salzburg.

=== Lausanne-Sport ===
On 9 January 2023, Bernède joined Lausanne-Sport in Switzerland on loan with an option to buy. On 23 June 2023, Lausanne-Sport made the transfer permanent and signed a three-year contract with Bernède.

=== Hellas Verona ===
On 3 February 2025, Bernède moved to Hellas Verona in Italy on loan, with a conditional obligation to buy.

== Personal life ==
Bernède's mother is Cameroonian and his father is French.

== Career statistics ==
=== Club ===
As of match played 6 December 2025

Club	Season	League			National Cup		League Cup		Europe		Other		Total	
Club	Season	Division	Apps	Goals	Apps	Goals	Apps	Goals	Apps	Goals	Apps	Goals	Apps	Goals
Paris Saint-Germain B	2016–17	National 2	17	1	—		—		—		—		17	1
Paris Saint-Germain B	2017–18	National 2	9	0	—		—		—		—		9	0
Paris Saint-Germain B	2018–19	National 2	4	0	—		—		—		—		4	0
Paris Saint-Germain B	Total		30	1	—		—		—		—		30	1
Paris Saint-Germain	2018–19	Ligue 1	2	0	0	0	0	0	0	0	1	0	3	0
Red Bull Salzburg	2018–19	Austrian Bundesliga	3	0	0	0	—		0	0	—		3	0
Red Bull Salzburg	2019–20	Austrian Bundesliga	10	0	3	0	—		2 (Note: One appearance in UEFA Champions League, one appearance in UEFA Europa League)	0	—		15	0
Red Bull Salzburg	2020–21	Austrian Bundesliga	19	1	3	0	—		3 (Note: One appearance in UEFA Champions League, two appearances in UEFA Europa League)	0	—		25	1
Red Bull Salzburg	2021–22	Austrian Bundesliga	17	0	4	0	—		0	0	—		21	0
Red Bull Salzburg	2022–23	Austrian Bundesliga	2	0	0	0	—		0	0	—		2	0
Red Bull Salzburg	Total		51	1	10	0	—		5	0	—		66	1
Lausanne-Sport (loan)	2022–23	Swiss Challenge League	17	1	—		—		—		—		3	0
Lausanne-Sport	2023–24	Swiss Super League	37	1	3	1	—		—		—		40	2
Lausanne-Sport	2024–25	Swiss Super League	16	1	2	1	—		—		—		18	2
Lausanne-Sport	Total		70	3	5	2	—		—		—		75	5
Hellas Verona (loan)	2024–25	Serie A	14	1	—		—		—		—		14	1
Hellas Verona	2025–26	Serie A	14	1	1	0	—		—		—		15	1
Hellas Verona	Total		28	2	1	0	—		—		—		29	2
Career total			181	7	16	2	0	0	5	0	1	0	203	9

== Honours ==
Paris Saint-Germain

- Trophée des Champions: 2018

Red Bull Salzburg

- Austrian Bundesliga: 2018–19, 2019–20, 2020–21, 2021-22
- Austrian Cup: 2018–19, 2019–20, 2020–21, 2021-22
