= Junior Adamu =

Austrian footballer (born 2001)

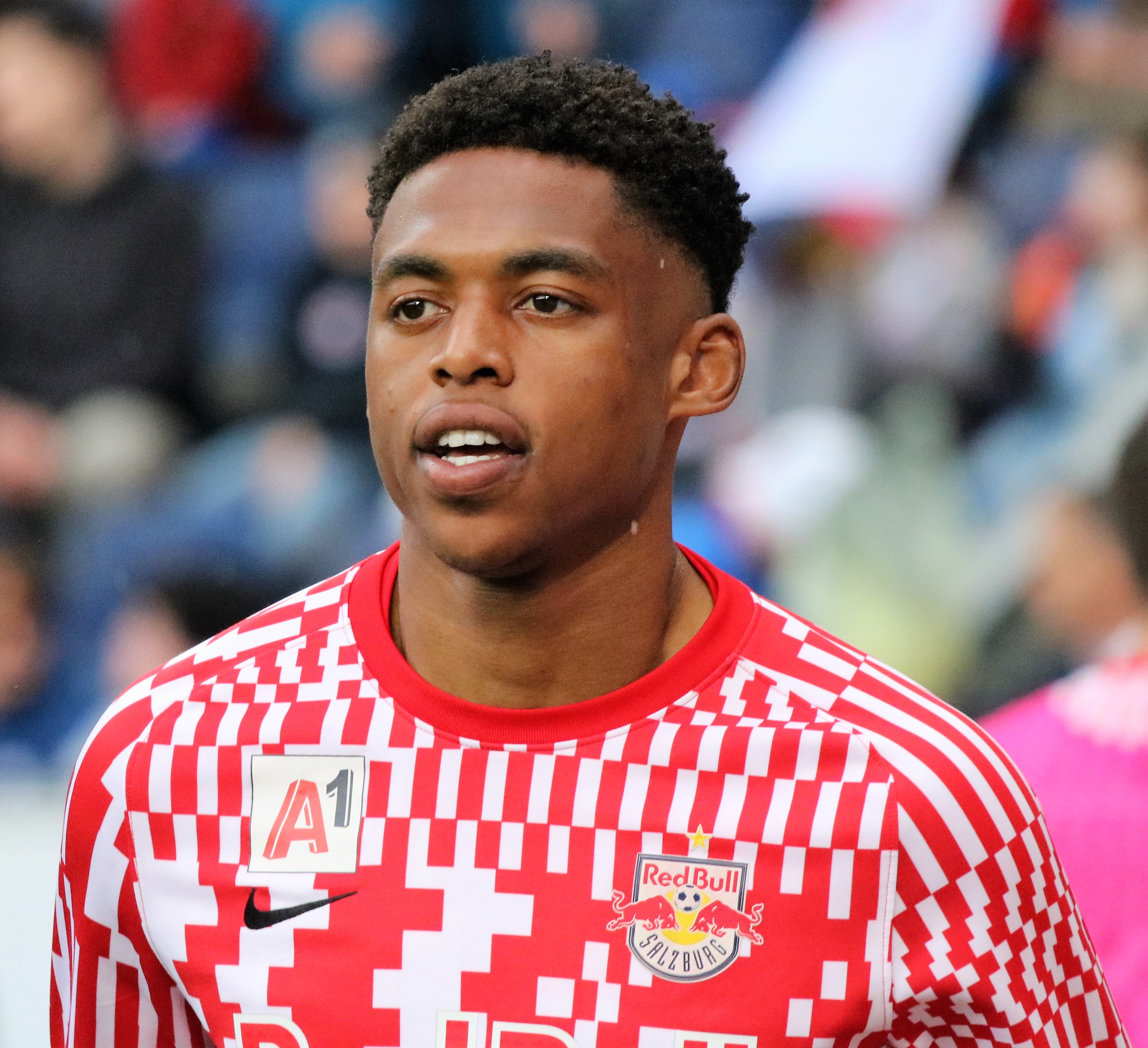
- Adamu with Red Bull Salzburg in 2022

Personal information
- Full name: Chukwubuike Junior Adamu
- Date of birth: 6 June 2001 (age 25)
- Place of birth: Kano, Nigeria
- Height: 1.82 m (6 ft 0 in)
- Position: Forward

Team information
- Current team: Schalke 04
- Number: 20

Youth career
- 2011–2014: GSV Wacker
- 2014–2015: Grazer AK
- 2015–2018: Red Bull Salzburg

Senior career*
Years	Team	Apps	(Gls)
2017–2020	FC Liefering	49	(26)
2020–2023	Red Bull Salzburg	58	(17)
2021	→ St. Gallen (loan)	14	(6)
2023–2026	SC Freiburg	49	(3)
2023	SC Freiburg II	2	(0)
2026	→ Celtic (loan)	4	(1)
2026–	Schalke 04	7	(1)

International career^{‡}
2018–2019	Austria U18	6	(0)
2019–2020	Austria U19	4	(3)
2020	Austria U21	12	(10)
2021–	Austria	11	(1)
- * Club domestic league appearances and goals as of 17 November 2026 ‡ National team caps and goals as of 17 November 2026

Chukwubuike Junior Adamu (born 6 June 2001) is a professional footballer who plays as a forward for Bundesliga club Schalke 04. Born in Nigeria, he plays for the Austria national team.

== Club career ==
=== Early career ===
Adamu started his career with the youth team of GSV Wacker. In January 2014 he came to Grazer AK. In 2015, he joined the Red Bull Salzburg Academy, where he progressed through the levels from U15 to U18.

=== FC Liefering ===
In September 2017, he was included in the FC Liefering squad for the first time. In the same month, he also debuted for Red Bull Salzburg's UEFA Youth League team, coming on for Nicolas Meister in a match against Bordeaux. He made his professional debut playing for FC Liefering against WSG Wattens in November 2018 as he came in for Karim Adeyemi.

=== Red Bull Salzburg ===
In September 2020, he made his debut for Red Bull Salzburg in an Austrian Cup match against SW Bregen, coming on in the 75th minute for Masaya Okugawa.

Adamu scored his first goal for Red Bull Salzburg in a 1–0 league win over Admira on 14 August 2021. The goal sealed Salzburg's fifth victory on the road in a row, the longest such run the club had had in a decade. Three days later, he made his first appearance in the UEFA Champions League, coming on as a substitute in a 2–1 home win over Danish Superliga champions Brøndby in the first leg of their play-off round clash. On 16 February 2022, Adamu scored his first UEFA Champions League goal in a 1–1 home draw against Bundesliga champions Bayern Munich in the first leg of the round of 16 tie after coming on as a substitute for Noah Okafor.

==== Loan to St. Gallen ====
On 15 February 2021, Adamu moved on loan to Swiss Super League team St. Gallen.

=== SC Freiburg ===
On 22 June 2023, German Bundesliga club SC Freiburg announced the signing of Adamu with an undisclosed contract.

==== Loan to Celtic ====
On 2 February 2026, Adamu joined Celtic on loan until the end of the season, with the club having the option to make the transfer permanent. He made his debut on 7 February 2026, coming on as a substitute in a Scottish Cup tie against Dundee, and scored a 97th-minute equaliser to take the game to extra time, which Celtic eventually won 2–1.

=== Schalke 04 ===
On 11 June 2026, Schalke 04 announced that they had signed Adamu until 30 June 2029.

== International career ==
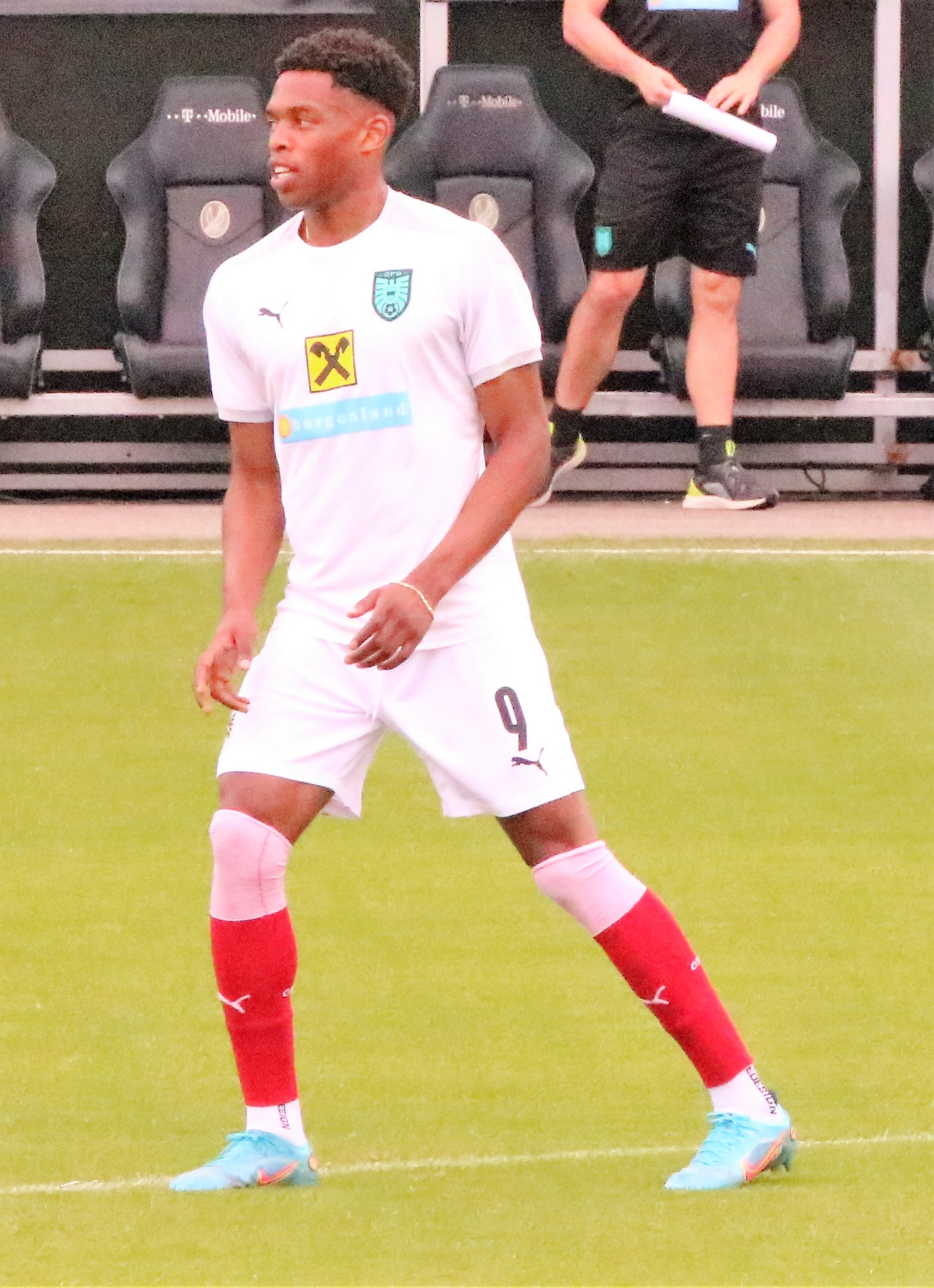
Adamu playing for Austria U21 in 2022

Born in Nigeria, Adamu represents Austria at international level and has played for the Austria U18, Austria U19, and Austria U21 teams.

He made his first appearance in the Austria senior national team on 12 November 2021 in a World Cup qualifier match vs. Israel.

== Career statistics ==
=== Club ===
As of match played 8 November 2026

Appearances and goals by club, season and competition
Club	Season	League			Cup (Note: Includes Austrian Cup, Swiss Cup)		Europe		Total	
Club	Season	Division	Apps	Goals	Apps	Goals	Apps	Goals	Apps	Goals
FC Liefering	2018–19	2. Liga	16	5	—		—		16	5
FC Liefering	2019–20	2. Liga	20	14	—		—		20	14
FC Liefering	2020–21	2. Liga	13	7	—		—		13	7
FC Liefering	Total		49	26	—		—		49	26
Red Bull Salzburg	2020–21	Austrian Bundesliga	0	0	1	0	0	0	1	0
Red Bull Salzburg	2021–22	Austrian Bundesliga	30	7	4	1	9 (Note: Appearances in UEFA Champions League)	1	43	9
Red Bull Salzburg	2022–23	Austrian Bundesliga	28	10	4	3	8 (Note: Six appearances in UEFA Champions League, two appearances in UEFA Europa League)	1	40	14
Red Bull Salzburg	Total		58	17	9	4	17	2	84	23
St. Gallen (loan)	2020–21	Swiss Super League	14	6	4	2	—		18	8
SC Freiburg II	2023–24	3. Liga	2	0	—		—		2	0
SC Freiburg	2023–24	Bundesliga	15	0	1	0	6 (Note: Appearances in UEFA Europa League)	1	22	1
SC Freiburg	2024–25	Bundesliga	25	2	2	2	—		27	4
SC Freiburg	2025–26	Bundesliga	9	1	2	0	7	1	18	2
SC Freiburg	Total		49	3	5	2	13	2	67	7
Celtic (loan)	2025–26	Scottish Premiership	4	0	1	1	1	0	6	1
Schalke 04	2026–27	Bundesliga	7	1	2	1	—		9	2
Career total			193	53	21	10	31	4	235	67

=== International ===
As of match played 17 November 2026

Appearances and goals by national team and year
National team	Year	Apps	Goals
Austria	2021	1	0
Austria	2022	2	0
Austria	2023	3	0
Austria	2024	3	0
Austria	2025	0	0
Austria	2026	2	1
Total		11	1

Scores and results list Austria's goal tally first, score column indicates score after each Adamu goal.

List of international goals scored by Junior Adamu
No.	Date	Venue	Cap	Opponent	Score	Result	Competition
1	27 September 2026	Ernst-Happel-Stadion, Vienna, Austria	10	Kosovo	2–0	3–1	2026–27 UEFA Nations League B

== Honours ==
Red Bull Salzburg

- Austrian Bundesliga: 2021–22, 2022–23
- Austrian Cup: 2021–22

Celtic

- Scottish Premiership: 2025-26
