= Kafue Celtic F.C. =

Association football club in Zambia

Kafue Celtic
- Full name: Kafue Celtic Football Club
- Nickname: The Crocs
- Founded: 2002; 24 years ago as Kafue F.C.
- Ground: Crocs Swamp
- Capacity: 6,000
- Owner: Lee Kawanu
- Manager: Carlos Sinyangwe
- League: Zambia Premier League
- 2025-26: Zambia National Division One, 6th of 18
- Website: http://kafuecelticfc.com/

Kafue Celtic Football Club (known as Kafue Celtic) is a Zambian football club based in Kafue, Zambia, that competes in the Zambia Premier League.

== History ==
Founded in 2002, the team plays its home matches at the Crocs Swamp. Founded in 2002, they started on the bottom of the Zambian football league system. The club is focused on youth development and the creation of player pathways with players like Enock Mwepu and Patson Daka signed for Premier League sides Brighton and Leicester City. These two transfers allowed the club to get around 7.9 million euros in Summer 2021 as 10% onward transfer fees and FIFA solidarity from FC Red Bull Salzburg.

The team has a player sharing partnership with Cádiz.

== Sponsorships ==
In September 2021, the team secured a $30,000 sponsorship deal with Indo-Zambia Bank Limited.

== Notable former players ==
- Patson Daka
- Enock Mwepu
- Chisamba Lungu
