= Enock Mwepu =

Zambian footballer (born 1998)

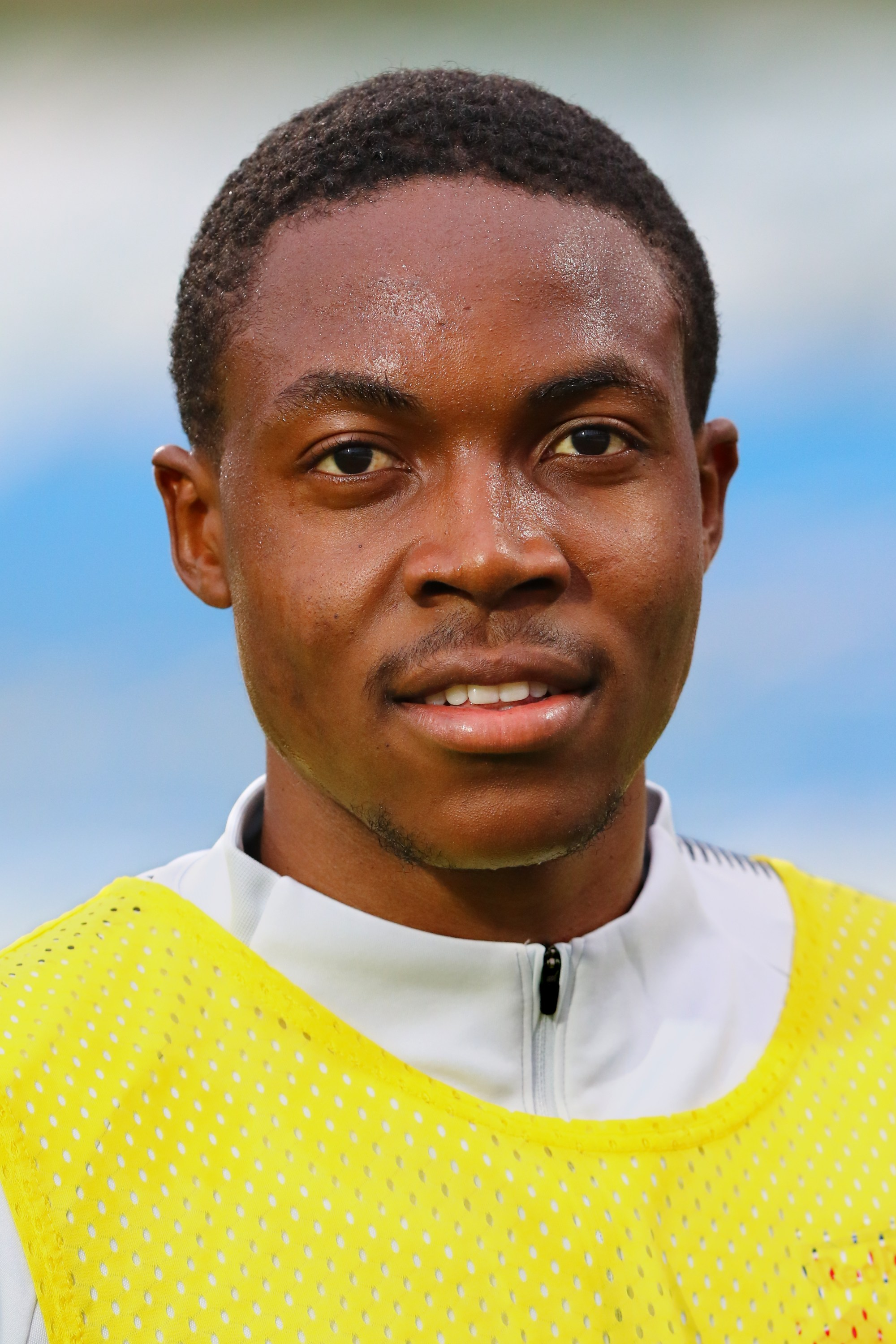
- Mwepu with Red Bull Salzburg in 2018

Personal information
- Full name: Enock Mwepu
- Date of birth: 1 January 1998 (age 28)
- Place of birth: Lusaka, Zambia
- Height: 1.84 m (6 ft 0 in)
- Position: Midfielder

Senior career*
Years	Team	Apps	(Gls)
2014	Kafue Celtic		
2015	Power Dynamos		
2016–2017	NAPSA Stars		(3)
2017	Kafue Celtic		
2017–2021	Red Bull Salzburg	81	(11)
2017–2018	→ FC Liefering (loan)	23	(6)
2021–2022	Brighton & Hove Albion	24	(2)
Total		128	(22)

International career
2017	Zambia U17		
2017–2018	Zambia U20	10	(3)
2017–2022	Zambia	23	(6)
- * Club domestic league appearances and goals

Enock Mwepu (born 1 January 1998) is a Zambian former professional footballer who played as a midfielder.

Having begun his career in his native Zambia, Mwepu signed for Austrian club Red Bull Salzburg in 2017 before moving Brighton & Hove Albion in 2021. Mwepu represented and captained the Zambia national team. On 10 October 2022, he was forced to retire following the discovery of a hereditary heart condition.

== Club career ==
=== Early career ===
Mwepu's career began with Kafue Celtic in Lusaka before being identified with the 2013 Airtel Rising Stars. During the 2015–16 season, Mwepu had little game time with Power Dynamos football club of Copperbelt; this precipitated into a move to NAPSA Stars at the end of the 2017 season.

=== Red Bull Salzburg and loan to FC Liefering ===
In June 2017, Mwepu joined Red Bull Salzburg and was loaned out to Salzburg's feeder club FC Liefering who play in Austrian Football First League. During the 2019–20 season, Mwepu established himself amongst Salzburg's starting eleven. He made his debut in the UEFA Champions League during a 4–3 loss to Liverpool at Anfield. On 18 December 2019, Mwepu extended his contract with Salzburg until summer 2024.

=== Brighton & Hove Albion ===
On 6 July 2021, he joined Premier League side Brighton & Hove Albion on a four-year contract, for an undisclosed fee. He scored in a 3–1 pre-season friendly win at Luton Town on 31 July.

He made his competitive debut on 14 August in the opening game of the 2021–22 season away at Burnley where he was replaced by Adam Lallana at half time of the 2–1 victory at Turf Moor. On 24 August, Mwepu assisted Jakub Moder's first Albion goal in the second round EFL Cup away fixture at Cardiff City where Albion won 2–0. He scored his first goal for Brighton on 27 October, putting them back level to 2–2 before a penalty shootout loss – in which his penalty was saved – away at Leicester City in the EFL Cup. Three days later, he scored his first league goal for the Sussex side, inspiring Brighton's comeback with a stunning 25–yard strike in a 2–2 away draw against Liverpool.

Mwepu had a slow start to 2022 and in general to his time in Sussex due to injury and illness, thus had limited playing time. On his first start since his return from injury Mwepu scored and made an assist for Trossard's opener in the 2–1 away win at Arsenal on 9 April, to help Brighton end their seven-match run without a victory. Graham Potter spoke that Mwepu has a "slight injury in his groin which probably means that will be him for the rest of the season," after picking up the knock during the 3–0 away victory at Wolverhampton Wanderers on 30 April. His debut season with the "Seagulls" was marred by injuries though he had made a positive impact and at the club's end of season awards Mwepu won Goal of the Season for his strike at Liverpool in October. Mwepu managed to recover in time to appear as a substitute in the last game of the season, a 3–1 home victory over West Ham United, with Brighton achieving their highest top flight finish in ninth place.

On 10 October 2022, Mwepu retired from professional football at the age of 24 after being diagnosed with a rare hereditary heart condition.

== International career ==
In 2014 Mwepu was part of the Zambia national under-17 team that represented the country at the 2015 African U-17 Championship, where Zambia played Niger, Nigeria and Guinea from group A. Mwepu is known for his versatility in the field of play as demonstrated at the 2017 Under-20 Africa Cup of Nations in Zambia, where he scored a goal and was among the best substitutes of the tournament.

Mwepu scored his first international goal for Zambia in an AFCON Qualifier against Algeria on 2 September 2017 at the National Heroes Stadium in Lusaka, a match which Zambia won 3–1.

== Coaching career ==
After retiring from professional football due to his heart condition, Brighton announced on 30 December that Mwepu had been appointed to serve in the role of under-9s coach in their academy from January 2023.

== Personal life ==
His younger brother Francisco Mwepu is also a professional footballer for Cadiz CF.

In January 2023, it was confirmed that Mwepu was in hospital in Zambia after a suspected heart attack, coming just a few months after being forced to retire from football due to a hereditary heart condition. Brighton announced he was receiving precautionary checks as a result.

== Career statistics ==
=== Club ===
Appearances and goals by club, season and competition
Club	Season	League			National cup (Note: Includes Austrian Cup, FA Cup)		League cup (Note: Includes EFL Cup)		Europe		Total	
Club	Season	Division	Apps	Goals	Apps	Goals	Apps	Goals	Apps	Goals	Apps	Goals
FC Liefering	2017–18	2. Liga	23	6	—		—		—		23	6
Red Bull Salzburg	2017–18	Austrian Bundesliga	8	1	2	0	—		0	0	10	1
Red Bull Salzburg	2018–19	Austrian Bundesliga	19	1	3	1	—		6 (Note: One appearance in UEFA Champions League, five appearances in UEFA Europa League)	0	28	2
Red Bull Salzburg	2019–20	Austrian Bundesliga	25	4	4	1	—		7 (Note: Five appearances in UEFA Champions League, two appearances in UEFA Europa League)	0	36	5
Red Bull Salzburg	2020–21	Austrian Bundesliga	29	5	6	5	—		10 (Note: Eight appearances in UEFA Champions League, two appearances in UEFA Europa League)	0	45	10
Red Bull Salzburg	Total		81	11	15	7	0	0	23	0	119	18
Brighton & Hove Albion	2021–22	Premier League	18	2	1	0	2	1	—		21	3
Brighton & Hove Albion	2022–23	Premier League	6	0	—		0	0	—		6	0
Brighton & Hove Albion	Total		24	2	1	0	2	1	0	0	27	3
Career total			128	19	16	7	2	1	23	0	169	27

=== International ===
Scores and results list Zambia's goal tally first, score column indicates score after each Mwepu goal.

List of international goals scored by Enock Mwepu
No.	Date	Venue	Opponent	Score	Result	Competition
1	2 September 2017	National Heroes Stadium, Lusaka, Zambia	Algeria	3–1	3–1	2018 FIFA World Cup qualification
2	16 June 2019	Stade de Marrakech, Marrakesh, Morocco	Morocco	3–2	3–2	Friendly
3	12 November 2020	National Heroes Stadium, Lusaka, Zambia	Botswana	1–1	2–1	2021 Africa Cup of Nations qualification
4	3 September 2021	Stade Olympique, Nouakchott, Mauritania	Mauritania	1–0	2–1	2022 FIFA World Cup qualification
5	25 March 2022	Kervansaray Sport Centre - Field 1, Antalya, Turkey	Congo	1–0	3–1	Friendly
6	7 June 2022	National Heroes Stadium, Lusaka, Zambia	Comoros	1–1	2–1	2023 Africa Cup of Nations qualification

== Honours ==
Red Bull Salzburg

- Austrian Bundesliga: 2017–18, 2018–19, 2019–20, 2020–21
- Austrian Cup: 2018–19, 2019–20, 2020–21

Zambia U20

- Africa U-20 Cup of Nations: 2017
- COSAFA U-20 Cup: 2016

Individual

- Austrian Bundesliga Team of the Year: 2020–21
- Brighton & Hove Albion Goal of the Season: 2021–22
