= David Gugganig =

Austrian footballer

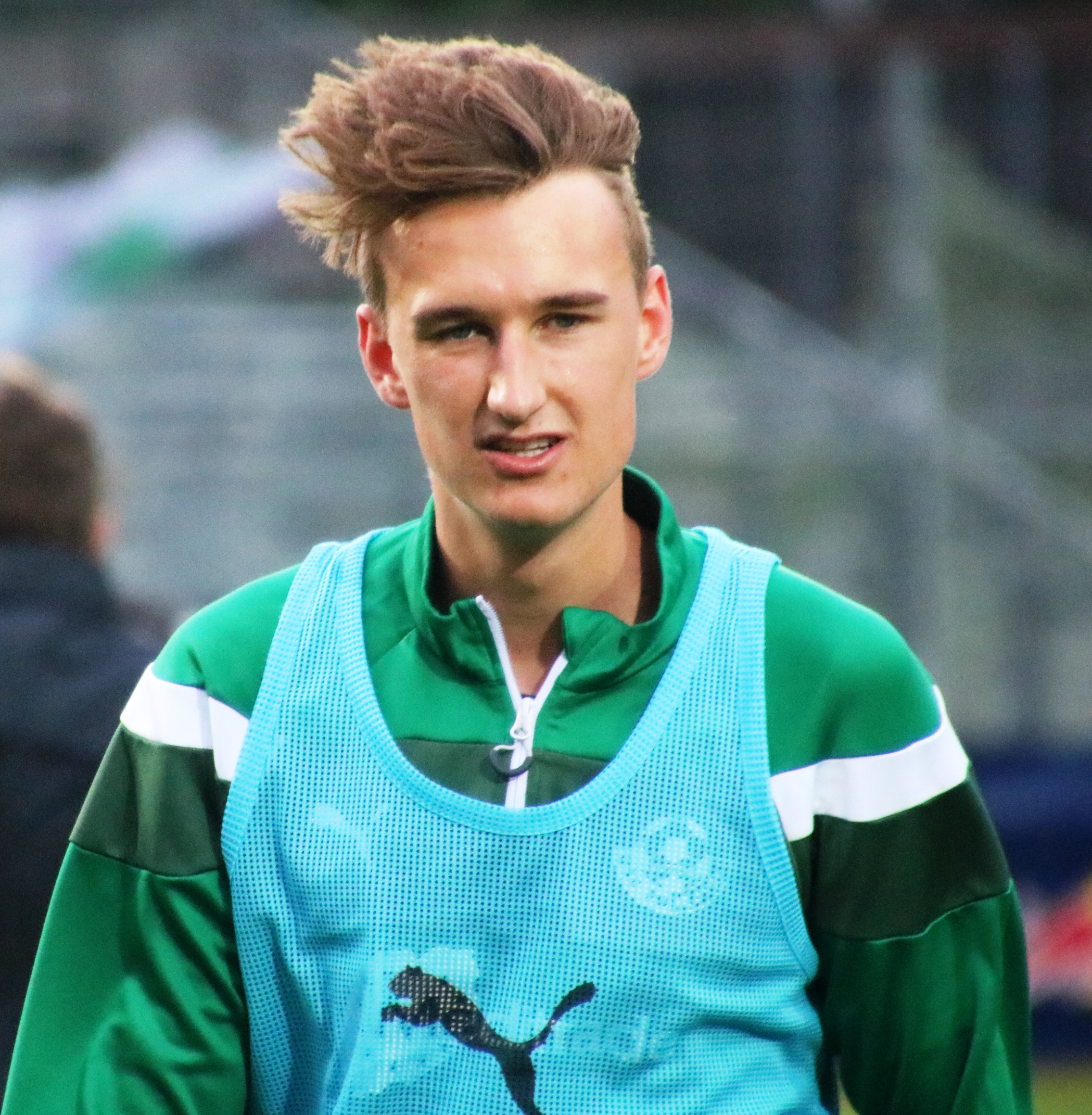
- Gugganig with WSG Wattens in 2017

Personal information
- Date of birth: 10 February 1997 (age 29)
- Place of birth: Spittal an der Drau, Austria
- Height: 1.90 m (6 ft 3 in)
- Position: Defender

Team information
- Current team: WSG Tirol
- Number: 3

Youth career
- 2002–2011: SC Mühldorf
- 2011–2014: AKA Kärnten
- 2014–2015: Red Bull Salzburg

Senior career*
Years	Team	Apps	(Gls)
2015–2017	FC Liefering	29	(1)
2017	→ WSG Wattens (loan)	16	(0)
2017–2021	WSG Wattens	110	(4)
2021–2023	Wolfsberger AC	25	(1)
2021–2023	Wolfsberger AC II	12	(1)
2023–	WSG Tirol	62	(1)

International career
2013–2014	Austria U17	11	(2)
2014–2015	Austria U18	6	(1)
2017	Austria U21	1	(0)
- * Club domestic league appearances and goals as of 10 June 2026

David Gugganig (born 10 February 1997) is an Austrian professional footballer who plays for WSG Tirol.

== Club career ==
He made his Austrian Football First League debut for FC Liefering on 6 March 2015 in a game against FC Wacker Innsbruck.

In January 2017, Gugganig was sent on loan to league rivals WSG Wattens.

After the loan ended, he stayed with WSG. He won promotion to the Austrian Football Bundesliga with the club as the First League champion in 2018–19, after which the club was renamed WSG Tirol. In four-and-a-half years at WSG, Gugganig made 126 appearances in the Bundesliga and First League.

On 14 June 2021, he signed a two-year contract with Wolfsberger AC.

On 29 July 2023, Gugganig returned to WSG Tirol.

== Personal life ==
His older brother Lukas Gugganig is also a football player.
