= Nico Mantl =

German footballer (born 2000)

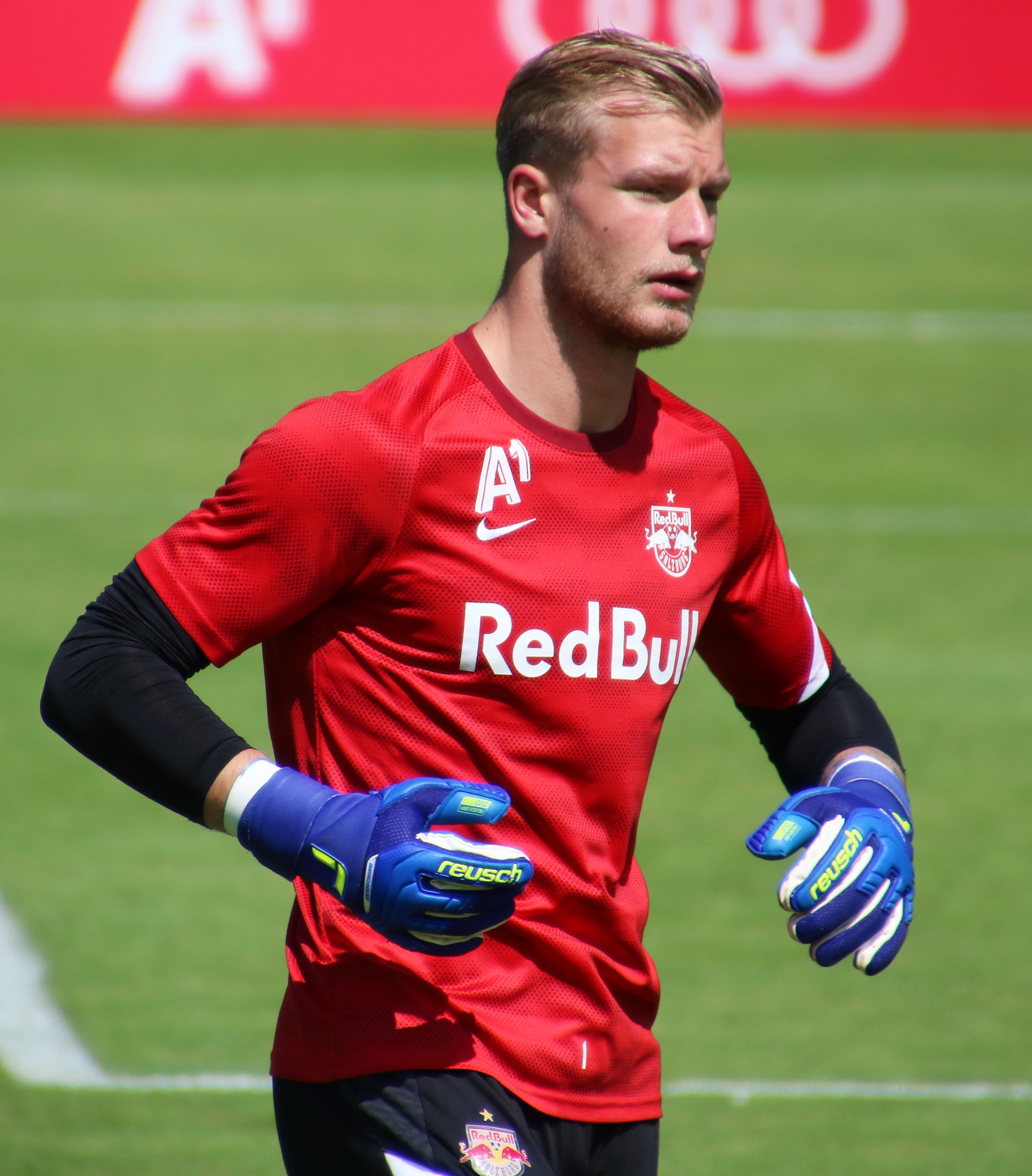
- Mantl with Red Bull Salzburg in 2021

Personal information
- Date of birth: 6 February 2000 (age 26)
- Place of birth: Munich, Germany
- Height: 1.93 m (6 ft 4 in)
- Position: Goalkeeper

Team information
- Current team: Kilmarnock
- Number: 58

Youth career
- –2011: FC Deisenhofen
- 2011–2017: SpVgg Unterhaching

Senior career*
Years	Team	Apps	(Gls)
2017–2021	SpVgg Unterhaching	57	(0)
2021	FC Liefering	1	(0)
2021–2024	Red Bull Salzburg	6	(0)
2023	→ AaB (loan)	8	(0)
2024	→ Viborg (loan)	15	(0)
2024–2026	Arouca	37	(0)
2026	→ Blau-Weiß Linz (loan)	15	(0)
2026–	Kilmarnock	0	(0)

International career
2021–2023	Germany U21	4	(0)
- * Club domestic league appearances and goals as of 10 June 2026

Nico Mantl (born 6 February 2000) is a German professional footballer who plays as a goalkeeper for Scottish Premiership club Kilmarnock.

== Club career ==
After nearly two seasons as SpVgg Unterhaching's first choice goalkeeper, Mantl completed a move to Austrian Bundesliga side Red Bull Salzburg in January 2021, signing a four-and-a-half-year deal. At the end of December 2022, Mantl signed loan deal for the rest of the season with Danish Superliga club AaB.

Mantl returned to Salzburg ahead of the 2023–24 season, sitting on the bench for a number of games in his first six months back at the club, while also getting a full game in the league against Blau-Weiß Linz in September 2023. In search of more playing time, Mantl returned to Denmark in January 2024; this time to Viborg FF, where Mantl signed a loan deal until the end of the season.

On 19 June 2024, it was announced that Mantl would join Portuguese side Arouca on a permanent deal on 1 July. On 27 January 2026, Arouca sent Mantl on loan to Austrian Bundesliga club Blau-Weiß Linz until the end of the 2025–26 season.

On 16 October 2026, Mantl joined Scottish Premiership club Kilmarnock on a short-term deal until the end of the 2026–27 season.

== Career statistics ==
As of match played 23 September 2023

Appearances and goals by club, season and competition
Club	Season	League			National cup		Continental		Other		Total	
Club	Season	Division	Apps	Goals	Apps	Goals	Apps	Goals	Apps	Goals	Apps	Goals
SpVgg Unterhaching	2017–18	3. Liga	2	0	—		—		—		2	0
SpVgg Unterhaching	2018–19	3. Liga	2	0	—		—		—		2	0
SpVgg Unterhaching	2019–20	3. Liga	35	0	—		—		—		35	0
SpVgg Unterhaching	2020–21	3. Liga	18	0	—		—		—		18	0
SpVgg Unterhaching	Total		57	0	—		—		—		57	0
FC Liefering	2020–21	2. Liga	1	0	—		—		—		1	0
Red Bull Salzburg	2020–21	Austrian Bundesliga	2	0	0	0	0	0	0	0	2	0
Red Bull Salzburg	2021–22	Austrian Bundesliga	3	0	0	0	0	0	0	0	3	0
Red Bull Salzburg	2023–24	Austrian Bundesliga	1	0	0	0	0	0	0	0	1	0
Red Bull Salzburg	Total		6	0	0	0	0	0	0	0	6	0
AaB (loan)	2022–23	Danish Superliga	8	0	0	0	—		—		8	0
Career total			72	0	0	0	0	0	0	0	72	0

== Honours ==
- Austrian Champion: 2020–21, 2021-22
- Austrian Cup: 2021, 2022
