= Daniel Owusu (footballer, born 2003) =

Ghanaian footballer

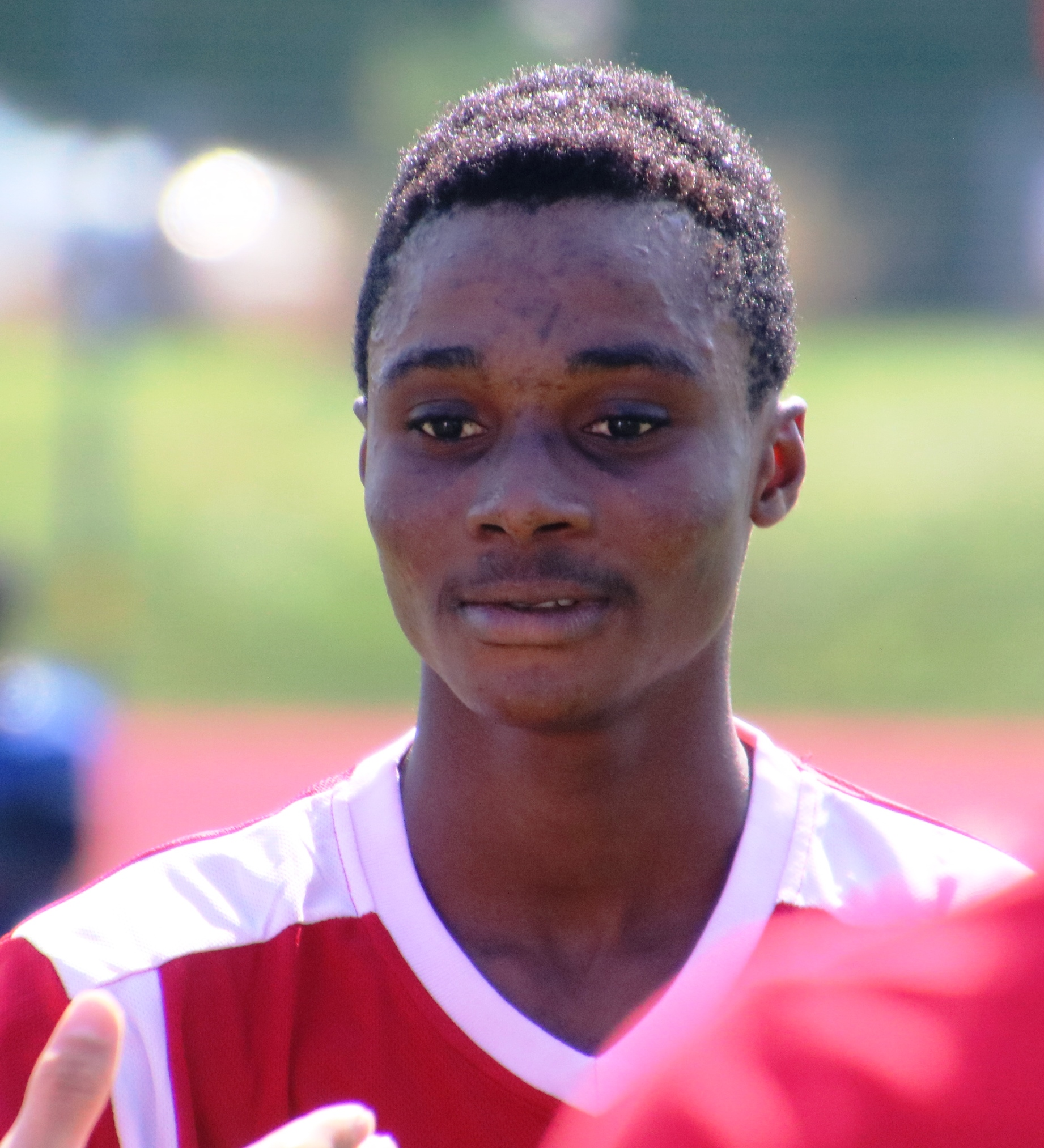
- Owusu in 2018

Personal information
- Date of birth: 25 January 2003 (age 23)
- Place of birth: Sogakope, Ghana
- Height: 1.83 m (6 ft 0 in)
- Position: Winger

Team information
- Current team: Dinamo Tbilisi
- Number: 38

Youth career
- WAFA

Senior career*
Years	Team	Apps	(Gls)
2018–2021	WAFA	28	(4)
2021–2024	Red Bull Salzburg	0	(0)
2021	→ SV Horn (loan)	10	(0)
2021–2022	→ FC Liefering (loan)	11	(2)
2022–2023	→ First Vienna FC (loan)	9	(2)
2023–2024	→ SKU Amstetten (loan)	6	(0)
2024	Samtredia	21	(5)
2025–	Dinamo Tbilisi	0	(0)
- * Club domestic league appearances and goals as of 30 September 2024

Daniel Owusu (born 25 January 2003) is a Ghanaian professional footballer who plays as a forward for Erovnuli Liga club Dinamo Tbilisi.

== Career ==
Owusu began his career with Ghana Premier League side West African Football Academy (WAFA) in Sogakope, rising through their youth ranks. In 2018, he was part of the WAFA under-16 team that competed in the Next Generation Trophy in Salzburg, Austria. Owusu scored three goals, including one in the final against Red Bull Brasil, leading WAFA to a 2–0 victory and their first tournament win. The 12-team competition included top clubs like Benfica, Bayern Munich, and Chelsea. Owusu was named the tournament's Most Valuable Player.

In 2019, Owusu was promoted to WAFA's senior team ahead of the GFA Special Competition. He made his professional debut on 31 March 2019, playing the full 90 minutes in a 3–1 win against Liberty Professionals. His first professional goal came on 10 April in a 2–1 victory over Karela United. Owusu ended the season with 13 appearances and 1 goal.

Owusu started the 2019–20 season strong, scoring his first Premier League goal on 5 January 2020 against Ebusua Dwarfs, just minutes after coming on as a substitute. He scored again in a 6–1 victory over Ashanti Gold. He finished the season with 10 appearances and 2 goals before the season was halted by the COVID-19 pandemic.

In the 2020–21 season, Owusu continued to make an impact, scoring his first goal of the season against Ebusua Dwarfs after earning a spot in the starting lineup. He was linked to FC Red Bull Salzburg along with WAFA teammate Forson Amankwah. After being linked to Red Bull Salzburg, Owusu was signed along with Forson Amankwah by the Austrian giants in February 2021 on a 4-year contract set to expire on 31 May 2025.

Red Bull Salzburg announced immediately after signing Owusu, that he had been loaned out to Austrian second-tier side SV Horn for the remainder of the season. Owusu joined First Vienna FC on loan on 16 August 2023. Owusu joined SKU Amstetten on loan on 12 August 2023.

On 18 January 2025, Dinamo Tbilisi announced the signing of Owusu to a two-year contract from Samtredia.
