= Csaba Bukta =

Hungarian footballer (born 2001)

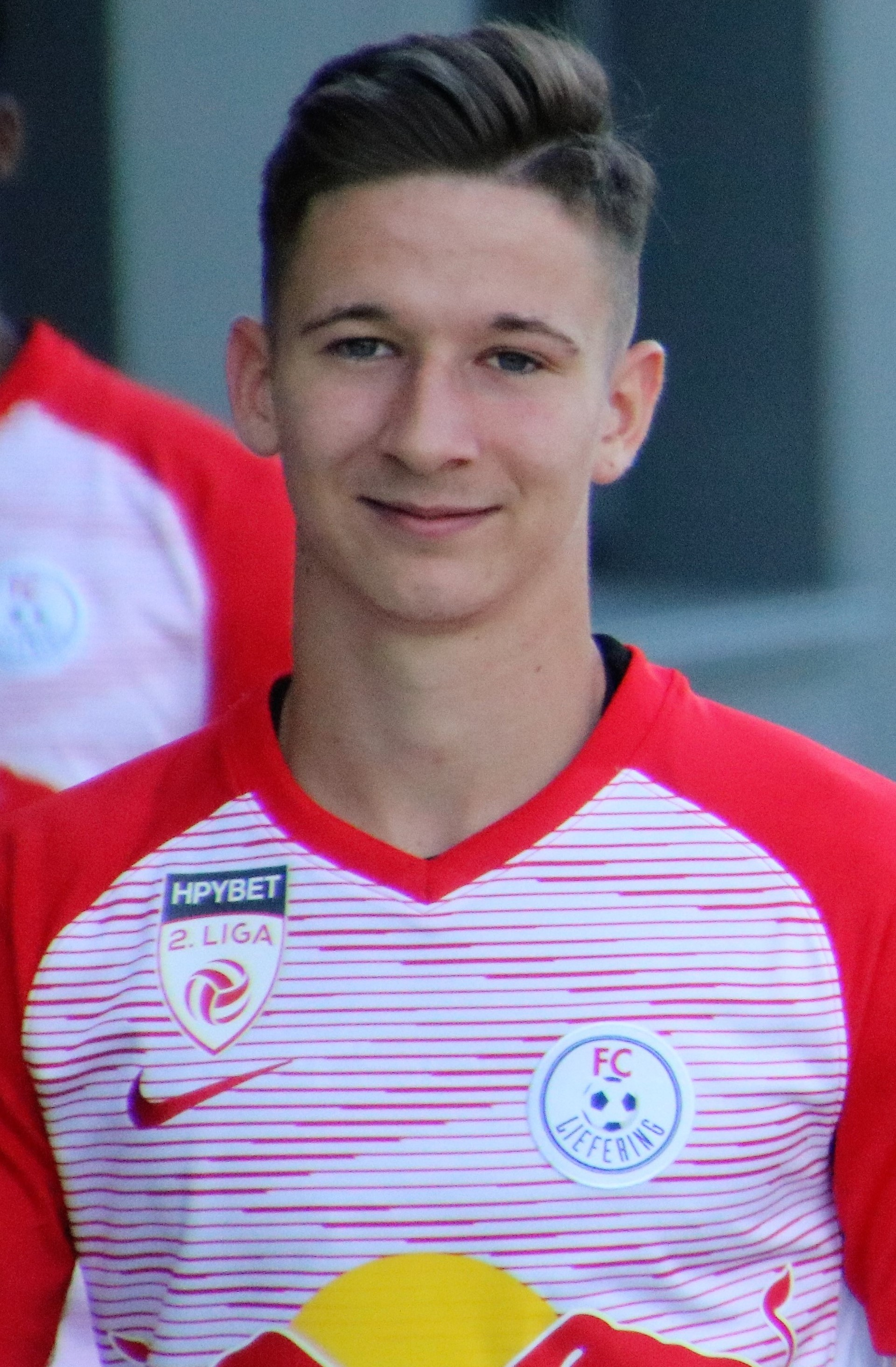
- Bukta in 2019

Personal information
- Date of birth: 25 July 2001 (age 25)
- Place of birth: Törökszentmiklós, Hungary
- Height: 1.76 m (5 ft 9 in)
- Position: Left winger

Team information
- Current team: Budafok (on loan from Vasas)
- Number: 11

Youth career
- 2008–2015: Törökszentmiklósi FC
- 2015–2017: Debreceni VSC
- 2017–2019: Red Bull Salzburg

Senior career*
Years	Team	Apps	(Gls)
2018–2021	FC Liefering	27	(9)
2021	→ Rheindorf Altach (loan)	17	(0)
2021–2024	Rheindorf Altach	46	(0)
2024–	Vasas	10	(0)
2025–	→ Budafok (loan)	23	(2)

International career
2017	Hungary U16	9	(1)
2017–2018	Hungary U17	11	(0)
2019	Hungary U19	3	(0)
- * Club domestic league appearances and goals as of 31 May 2026

Csaba Bukta (born 25 July 2001) is a Hungarian professional footballer who plays as a forward for NB II club Budafok, on loan from Vasas.

== Honours ==
Red Bull Salzburg Youth

- Jugendliga U18: 2019
