= 2021–22 FC Admira Wacker Mödling season =

117th season in existence of Admira Wacker

Admira Wacker
2021–22 season
- Owner: Flyeralarm Future Labs GmbH (20%); Weiss Invest Consult GmbH (15%); Online Druck GmbH (9%); Philip Thonhauser (1%); Michael Beranek (1%)
- Chairman: Philip Thonhauser
- Manager: Andi Herzog
- Stadium: BSFZ-Arena
- Austrian Bundesliga: 12th (relegated)
- Austrian Cup: Second round
- Top goalscorer: League: Roman Kerschbaum (9); All: Roman Kerschbaum (10)
- Highest home attendance: 5,100 vs Austria Wien (6 March 2022); Austrian Bundesliga
- Lowest home attendance: 1,000 vs SV Ried (12 March 2022); Austrian Bundesliga
- Average home league attendance: 2,001
Home colours	Away colours

The 2021–22 season was the 117th season in the existence of Admira Wacker Mödling and the club's tenth consecutive season in the top flight of Austrian football. In addition to the domestic league, Admira Wacker Mödling participated in this season's edition of the Austrian Cup. Due to a 2017 sponsorship agreement with the Würzburg-based online printing company Flyeralarm, which secured the club's naming rights, Admira Wacker Mödling was officially known as FC Flyeralarm Admira throughout the season.

Despite finishing 11th in the regular season, six points clear of last-place Rheindorf Altach, Admira Wacker struggled in the relegation round, failing to win any of their final five matches. Their relegation was confirmed on the final matchday following a 3–1 defeat to LASK.

== Background ==
Admira Wacker has been a member of the Austrian Bundesliga since their promotion from the 2. Liga in 2011. The club faced challenges following the league's restructuring in the 2018–19 season, which expanded the league from 10 to 12 teams and introduced a split into championship and relegation rounds after 22 matches. Consequently, Admira often finished in the bottom half of the table, narrowly avoiding relegation on multiple occasions.

The 2021–22 season marked the club's tenth consecutive year in the Bundesliga. The previous season was tumultuous, with several coaching changes. Zvonimir Soldo resigned in September 2020, just months after his appointment in February. He was succeeded by Damir Burić, who was dismissed in April 2021, leaving the team only two points above last place, held by SKN St. Pölten. Klaus Schmidt returned as head coach, having previously led the team to safety in the 2019–20 season. Ultimately, the Südstädter finished the 2020–21 season second-to-last, six points clear of relegation.

== Coach and player changes ==
=== Out ===
On 20 May 2021, the day before Admira's final league match against SC Rheindorf Altach, it was announced that head coach Schmidt's contract would not be renewed, ending his tenure at the club. Several players also left during the off-season: Erwin Hoffer, Marcus Maier, Lukas Rath, Pascal Petlach and Christian Gartner did not have their contracts extended, while David Atanga, Max Breunig, and Max Sax returned to their parent clubs following loan spells. Additionally, Christoph Haas, Julian Turi, and Nicolas Zdichynec joined SV Ried on permanent deals, Tomislav Tomić made a free transfer back to Olimpija Ljubljana, and Andrew Wooten joined VfL Osnabrück.

Several players departed during the January 2022 transfer window. Luca Kronberger and Miloš Spasić had secured moves in December to Sturm Graz and Kavala, respectively. In January, Marco Hausjell and Niko Datković transferred to Würzburger Kickers and Mirandés, while Stephan Auer joined First Vienna FC on a free transfer. In February, Marco Kadlec moved to FC Juniors OÖ.

Another Admira player who made first-team appearances in the 2021–22 season, Patrick, was loaned to Azerbaijani club Gabala in January on an 18-month deal.

=== In ===
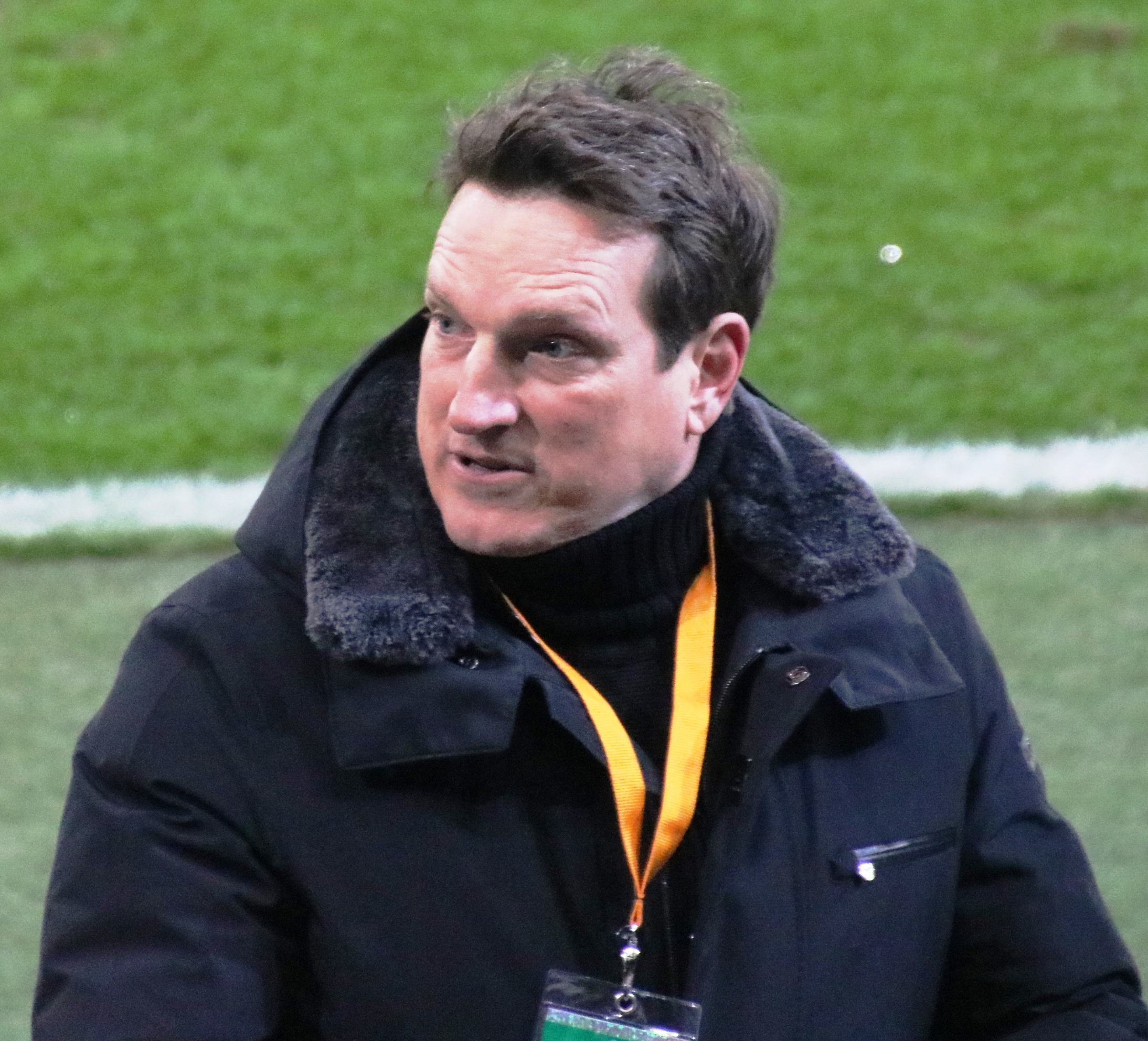
Andi Herzog (pictured in 2018) was appointed head coach of Admira Wacker ahead of the 2021–22 season.

Schmidt was succeeded as head coach by former Austrian international Andi Herzog, who signed a multi-year contract with the club on 24 May. Admira's first player signings came shortly after Herzog's arrival, with striker Marlon Mustapha the first announced on 10 June on loan from 1. FSV Mainz 05. The Südstädter added two other players on loan during the off-season, with Ilay Elmkies joining from TSG Hoffenheim and Philipp Schmiedl from Sønderjyske. Adding to their defensive ranks, Admira brought back Stephan Zwierschitz, returning to the club from Austria Wien on 24 June, as well as Yannick Brugger from Eintracht Frankfurt on a free on 5 July. Four days later, Admira signed Brazilian striker Patrick on a free transfer from second-tier side SV Horn. On transfer deadline day, 1 September, Admira brought back their second former player from Austria Wien, with Thomas Ebner on a one-year deal with an option for an additional season.

During the January transfer window, with Admira only three points above the relegation spot, several players were brought in. The signing of midfielder Jan Vodháněl was already secured in November 2021, with right-back Sámuel Major, and striker Stefano Surdanovic joining the club on 5 January and 3 February, respectively.

== Pre-season and friendlies ==
Admira played a series of friendlies to prepare for the upcoming season. On 19 June 2021, they defeated SV Horn 4–0 at home at BSFZ-Arena. A week later, on 26 June, they were beaten 4–0 by Slovan Bratislava in Bad Blumau. The team then secured wins against lower-division sides, beating SC Kalsdorf 6–1 on 30 June and Gleisdorf 09 6–0 on 1 July 2021. The team then hosted Russian club CSKA Moscow on 9 July, where they lost 1–0. On 20 July, the team played a final pre-season match against Wiener Viktoria, securing a 1–0 victory with a penalty goal by René Hellermann. This match marked the first use of the Video Assistant Referee (VAR) system at the BSFZ-Arena, with VAR playing a decisive role in awarding the penalty. Their final friendly of the year occurred on 11 August, with the team losing 5–1 at home to seven-time Qatari champions Al-Duhail.

Date	Opponents	Venue	Result (Note: Admira Wacker's score written first)	Scorers	Attendance
19 June 2021	SV Horn	H	4–0	Ganda 33', Bauer '45, Hausjell '55, Wooten 62'	0
26 June 2021	Slovan Bratislava	A	0–4		0
30 June 2021	SC Kalsdorf	A	6–1	Kerschbaum 12', Kadlec '26, Zwierschitz '53, Elmkies 63' (pen.), Ristanic '87, Hellermann '90	100
1 July 2021	Gleisdorf 09	A	6–0	Ganda (2) 4', 10', Badji '11, Starkl '61, Ristanic '78, Koller '88	0
9 July 2021	CSKA Moscow	H	0–1		0
20 July 2021	Wiener Viktoria	H	1–0	Hellermann '74 (pen.)	200
11 August 2021	Al-Duhail	H	1–5	Charly '16	0

== Competitions ==
=== Overall record ===
Competition	First match	Last match	Starting round	Final position	Record							
Competition	First match	Last match	Starting round	Final position	Pld	W	D	L	GF	GA	GD	Win %
Austrian Bundesliga	24 July 2021	20 May 2021	Matchday 1	12th place (relegated)	32	6	13	13	36	46	−10	18.75
Austrian Cup	16 July 2021	23 September 2021	Second round	—	2	1	1	0	4	1	+3	50.00
Total					34	7	14	13	40	47	−7	20.59

Source: Austrian Bundesliga

=== Austrian Bundesliga ===
==== League tables ====
Austrian Bundesliga regular season table
Pos	Team	Pld	W	D	L	GF	GA	GD	Pts	Qualification
8	LASK	22	6	7	9	28	29	−1	25	Qualification for the Relegation round
9	WSG Tirol	22	5	8	9	30	42	−12	23	Qualification for the Relegation round
10	Hartberg	22	5	7	10	29	35	−6	22	Qualification for the Relegation round
11	Admira Wacker Mödling	22	4	8	10	25	31	−6	20	Qualification for the Relegation round
12	Rheindorf Altach	22	3	4	15	10	38	−28	13	Qualification for the Relegation round

Source: Austrian Football Bundesliga
Rules for classification: 1) Points; 2) Head-to-head record; 3) Goal difference; 4) Goals scored; 5) Matches won; 6) Away matches won; 7) Away goals scored.

Austrian Bundesliga relegation round table
Pos	Team	Pld	W	D	L	GF	GA	GD	Pts	Qualification	WAT	LIN	ALT	RIE	HAR	ADM
1	WSG Tirol	32	10	10	12	46	58	−12	28	Qualification for the Europa Conference League play-offs	—	4–0	0–3	2–0	4–2	0–0
2	LASK	32	9	12	11	44	42	+2	26	Qualification for the Europa Conference League play-offs	6–0	—	2–1	0–2	3–3	3–1
3	Rheindorf Altach	32	7	8	17	24	49	−25	22		2–1	0–0	—	1–1	0–0	2–2
4	Ried	32	8	13	11	40	54	−14	22		2–3	1–1	1–2	—	0–0	1–1
5	Hartberg	32	7	12	13	43	47	−4	22		0–1	0–0	4–0	1–1	—	1–2
6	Admira Wacker Mödling (R)	32	6	13	13	36	46	−10	21	Relegation to Austrian Football Second League	1–1	1–1	0–3	2–0	1–3	—

Source: Austrian Bundesliga
Legend: Blue = home team win; Yellow = draw; Red = away team win.
Rules for classification: 1) Points; 2) Points with (possible) half points subtracted due to rounding; 3) Head-to-head points; 4) Head-to-head goal difference; 5) Head-to-head goals scored; 6) Head-to-head away goals scored; 7) Goal difference; 8) Goals scored; 9) Matches won; 10) Away matches won; 11) Away goals scored.
(R) Relegated

==== Results summary ====
Overall								Home						Away					
Pld	W	D	L	GF	GA	GD	Pts	W	D	L	GF	GA	GD	W	D	L	GF	GA	GD
32	6	13	13	36	46	−10	31	3	4	9	16	22	−6	3	9	4	20	24	−4

Last updated: 20 May 2022.
Source: Austrian Football Bundesliga

Results by matchday
Matchday	1	2	3	4	5	6	7	8	9	10	11	12	13	14	15	16	17	18	19	20	21	22	23	24	25	26	27	28	29	30	31	32
Ground	A	H	A	H	A	H	A	H	A	H	A	H	A	H	A	H	A	H	A	H	A	H	H	A	A	H	A	H	A	H	H	A
Result	D	W	L	L	L	D	W	D	L	W	D	L	D	L	D	L	D	L	D	L	W	L	W	D	D	D	W	L	D	D	L	L
Position	5	2	5	7	11	10	6	5	8	6	6	8	8	9	10	10	11	11	11	11	10	11	9	9	10	9	7	9	10	10	11	12

Source: Austrian Bundesliga
A = Away; H = Home; W = Win; D = Draw; L = Loss

==== Matches ====
===== Regular season =====
The league fixtures were announced on 22 June 2021.

Matchday	Date	Opponents	H / A	Result F–A	Scorers	Attendance	League position	Ref.
1	24 July 2021	WSG Tirol	A	1–1	Vorsager 90+4'	890	5th	
2	31 July 2021	Austria Klagenfurt	H	4–0	Zwierschitz 67', Babuşcu 70', 77', Aiwu 90+2'	1,497	2nd	
3	7 August 2021	Ried	A	1–2	Mustapha '72	3,138	5th	
4	14 August 2021	Red Bull Salzburg	H	0–1		3,049	7th	
5	21 August 2021	Wolfsberger AC	A	0–3		2,069	11th	
6	29 August 2021	Sturm Graz	H	1–1	Kerschbaum 70'	2,590	10th	
7	11 September 2021	Rapid Wien	A	2–1	Kerschbaum 51', Zwierschitz 86'	15,979	6th	
8	18 September 2021	TSV Hartberg	H	1–1	Ganda 17'	1,427	5th	
9	26 September 2021	LASK	A	1–3	Kerschbaum 33' (pen.)	4,126	8th	
10	2 October 2021	Rheindorf Altach	H	2–0	Ebner 9', Mustapha 52'	1,450	6th	
11	16 October 2021	Austria Wien	A	2–2	Ganda 14', Patrick 74'	8,251	6th	
12	23 October 2021	WSG Tirol	H	0–1		1,300	8th	
13	30 October 2021	Austria Klagenfurt	A	3–3	Hausjell 11', Kerschbaum 32' (pen.), 82' (pen.)	4,111	8th	
14	6 November 2021	Ried	H	1–2	Mustapha 19'	1,553	9th	
15	20 November 2021	Red Bull Salzburg	A	0–0		5,821	10th	
16	27 November 2021	Wolfsberger AC	H	0–1		0 (Note: Match played behind closed doors due to COVID-19 pandemic lockdown)	10th	
17	4 December 2021	Sturm Graz	A	1–1	Vorsager 38'	0	11th	
18	12 December 2021	Rapid Wien	H	1–2	Zwierschitz 18'	2,600	11th	
19	13 February 2022	TSV Hartberg	A	1–1	Vodháněl 44'	1,637	11th	
20	19 February 2022	LASK	H	0–3		1,300	11th	
21	26 February 2022	Rheindorf Altach	A	2–0	Kerschbaum 8', Mustapha 49'	2,703	10th	
22	6 March 2022	Austria Wien	H	1–2	Vorsager 7'	5,100	11th	

===== Relegation round =====
Matchday	Date	Opponents	H / A	Result F–A	Scorers	Attendance	League position	Ref.
23	12 March 2022	Ried	H	2–0	Kerschbaum 11' (pen.), 72' (pen.)	1,000	9th	
24	19 March 2022	WSG Tirol	A	0–0		1,145	9th	
25	2 April 2022	Rheindorf Altach	A	2–2	Nanizayamo 45+1' (o.g.), Surdanovic 48'	3,047	9th	
26	9 April 2022	LASK	H	1–1	Lukačević 47'	1,450	9th	
27	16 April 2022	TSV Hartberg	A	2–1	Kerschbaum 13' (pen.), Surdanovic 41'	1,256	7th	
28	23 April 2022	TSV Hartberg	H	1–3	Mustapha 90+2'	1,499	9th	
29	26 April 2022	Ried	A	1–1	Mustapha 90' (pen.)	2,350	11th	
30	7 May 2022	WSG Tirol	H	1–1	Luan 87'	2,300	10th	
31	14 May 2022	Rheindorf Altach	H	0–3		3,000	10th	
32	20 May 2022	LASK	A	1–3	Lukačević 56'	6,000	12th	

=== Austrian Cup ===
16 July 2021 First round	Neusiedl	0–4	Admira Wacker Mödling	Neusiedl am See
19:00 CEST (UTC+2)	Marek Beseda (yellow card) 88'	Report	Kerschbaum 29' (pen.); Zwierschitz 37'; Kronberger 41'; Starkl 61'	Stadium: Sportzentrum Neusiedl; Attendance: 579; Referee: Gerhard Grobelnik

23 September 2021 Second round	Admira Wacker Mödling	1–2 (a.e.t.)	Rapid Wien	Maria Enzersdorf
20:30 CEST (UTC+2)	Malicsek (yellow card) 29'; Kerschbaum (yellow card) 34'; Marlon Mustapha 63'; Zwierschitz (yellow card) 90+4'; Leitner (yellow card) 97'; Ostrzolek (yellow card) 116'	Report	Ullmann (yellow card) 10', (goal) 38'; Aiwu (yellow card) 24'; Grüll (yellow card) 97', (goal) 110' (pen.)	Stadium: BSFZ-Arena; Attendance: 1,200; Referee: Manuel Schüttengruber

== Player details ==
Admira Wacker played 34 matches during the 2021–22 season, comprising 32 league games and two Austrian Cup fixtures. Andreas Leitner was the only player to appear in every match, playing every minute of the season. Throughout all competitions, the team utilised 29 different players, with 16 players contributing to a combined total of 40 goals.

List of squad players, including number of appearances by competition

No.	Pos	Nat	Player	Total		Austrian Bundesliga		Austrian Cup	
No.	Pos	Nat	Player	Apps	Goals	Apps	Goals	Apps	Goals
1	GK	(Austria) AUT	Andreas Leitner	34	0	32	0	2	0
3	DF	(Austria) AUT	Philipp Schmiedl	22	0	21	0	1	0
4	DF	(Austria) AUT	Sebastian Bauer	26	0	24	0	2	0
12	DF	(Austria) AUT	Lukas Malicsek	31	0	30	0	1	0
15	DF	(Austria) AUT	Stephan Zwierschitz	32	4	30	3	2	1
23	DF	(Germany) GER	Yannick Brugger	13	0	12	0	1	0
27	DF	(Austria) AUT	Emanuel Aiwu	6	1	5	1	1	0
31	DF	(Brazil) BRA	Luan	6	1	6	1	0	0
37	DF	(Austria) AUT	Leonardo Lukačević	30	2	28	2	2	0
84	DF	(Germany) GER	Matthias Ostrzolek	23	0	22	0	1	0
93	DF	(Croatia) CRO	Niko Datković	10	0	9	0	1	0
8	MF	(Austria) AUT	Roman Kerschbaum	28	10	26	9	2	1
10	MF	(Israel) ISR	Ilay Elmkies	13	0	12	0	1	0
11	MF	(Austria) AUT	Joseph Ganda	23	2	21	2	2	0
17	MF	(Austria) AUT	Stephan Auer	4	0	3	0	1	0
18	MF	(Czech Republic) CZE	Jan Vodháněl	14	1	14	1	0	0
19	MF	(Austria) AUT	Wilhelm Vorsager	29	3	27	3	2	0
22	MF	(Austria) AUT	Filip Ristanic	12	0	10	0	2	0
25	MF	(Austria) AUT	Thomas Ebner	24	1	23	1	1	0
39	MF	(Austria) AUT	Onurhan Babuşcu	12	2	10	2	2	0
77	MF	(Hungary) HUN	Sámuel Major	7	0	7	0	0	0
86	MF	(Serbia) SRB	Stefano Surdanovic	14	2	14	2	0	0
7	FW	(Austria) AUT	Dominik Starkl	17	1	15	0	2	1
9	FW	(Austria) AUT	Marlon Mustapha	28	7	27	6	1	1
24	FW	(Austria) AUT	Marco Hausjell	9	1	8	1	1	0
29	FW	(Bulgaria) BUL	Vladimir Nikolov	5	0	5	0	0	0
63	FW	(Austria) AUT	Luca Kronberger	19	1	17	0	2	1
74	FW	(Austria) AUT	Angelo Gattermayer	13	0	13	0	0	0
98	FW	(Brazil) BRA	Patrick	8	1	8	1	0	0
