= List of Austrian football transfers winter 2021–22 =

Austrian football transfers 2021–22

This is a list of Austrian football transfers for the 2021–22 winter transfer window. Only transfers featuring Austrian Football Bundesliga are listed.

== Austrian Football Bundesliga ==
Note: Flags indicate national team as has been defined under FIFA eligibility rules. Players may hold more than one non-FIFA nationality.

=== Red Bull Salzburg ===
In:

No.	Pos.	Nation	Player
2	DF	BEL	Ignace Van Der Brempt (from (Belgium) Club Brugge)
—	MF	CIV	Oumar Diakité (from (Ivory Coast) ASEC Mimosas)
—	MF	GHA	Lawrence Agyekum (from (Ghana) WAFA)

Out:

No.	Pos.	Nation	Player
29	DF	GER	Kilian Ludewig (on loan to (Netherlands) Willem II)
—	MF	CIV	Oumar Diakité (on loan to Liefering)
—	MF	GHA	Lawrence Agyekum (on loan to Liefering)
—	MF	MLI	Youba Diarra (on loan to Hartberg, previously on loan at (United States) New York Red Bulls)
—	FW	MLI	Dorgeles Nene (on loan to SV Ried, previously on loan at Liefering)
—	GK	BRA	Carlos Coronel (to (United States) New York Red Bulls, previously on loan)
—	FW	BRA	Luis Phelipe (to (Brazil) Atlético Goianiense, previously on loan at (Switzerland) Lugano)

=== Rapid Wien ===
In:

No.	Pos.	Nation	Player
38	FW	NED	Ferdy Druijf (on loan from (Netherlands) AZ, previously on loan at (Belgium) Mechelen)

Out:

No.	Pos.	Nation	Player
10	MF	AUT	Thierno Ballo (loan return to (England) Chelsea)
29	FW	AUT	Ercan Kara (to (United States) Orlando City)
31	DF	AUT	Maximilian Ullmann (to (Italy) Venezia)

=== Sturm Graz ===
In:

No.	Pos.	Nation	Player
9	FW	DEN	Rasmus Højlund (from (Denmark) Copenhagen)
23	MF	AUT	Luca Kronberger (from Admira Wacker)

Out:

No.	Pos.	Nation	Player
9	FW	ITA	Kelvin Yeboah (to (Italy) Genoa)
—	MF	AUT	Sebastian Zettl (to Gleisdorf 09, previously on loan at FAC)

=== LASK ===
In:

No.	Pos.	Nation	Player
3	DF	CIV	Oumar Sako (from (Bulgaria) Beroe)
18	MF	SRB	Branko Jovičić (from (Russia) Ural Yekaterinburg)
26	DF	CZE	Filip Twardzik (from (Slovakia) Spartak Trnava)

Out:

No.	Pos.	Nation	Player
9	FW	FRA	Mamoudou Karamoko (to (Denmark) Copenhagen)
22	FW	AUT	Christoph Monschein (on loan to SCR Altach)
31	MF	AUT	Lukas Grgić (to (Croatia) Hajduk Split)
32	DF	SUI	Enrique Wild (on loan to Juniors OÖ)
—	MF	ISR	Yoav Hofmayster (on loan to (Israel) Maccabi Petah Tikva, previously on loan at (Israel) Hapoel Tel Aviv)
—	DF	UKR	Yevhen Cheberko (to (Croatia) Osijek, previously on loan)

=== Wolfsberg ===
In:

No.	Pos.	Nation	Player

Out:

No.	Pos.	Nation	Player
3	DF	SWE	Gustav Henriksson (to (Sweden) Elfsborg)
34	FW	AUT	Marcel Holzer (to Wiener Sport-Club)

=== WSG Tirol ===
In:

No.	Pos.	Nation	Player
33	FW	SWE	Tim Prica (on loan from (Denmark) AaB)
44	DF	GER	Kofi Schulz (free agent)
77	MF	AUT	Julius Ertlthaler (free agent)
98	MF	SLO	Sandi Ogrinec (from (Slovenia) Bravo)

Out:

No.	Pos.	Nation	Player
3	DF	RUS	Leon Klassen (to (Russia) Spartak Moscow)
6	MF	GRE	Thanos Petsos (to (Latvia) Riga)

=== Hartberg ===
In:

No.	Pos.	Nation	Player
9	MF	TUR	Okan Aydin (from Wacker Innsbruck)
17	MF	AUT	Mario Kröpfl (from Lafnitz)
29	DF	AUT	Patrick Farkas (from (Switzerland) Luzern)
32	MF	MLI	Youba Diarra (on loan from Red Bull Salzburg, previously on loan at (United States) New York Red Bulls)

Out:

No.	Pos.	Nation	Player
7	MF	AUT	Michael John Lema (to Lafnitz)
9	MF	SRB	Nemanja Belaković (to (Latvia) Liepāja)
22	DF	AUT	David Stec (to (Poland) Lechia Gdańsk)

=== Austria Wien ===
In:

No.	Pos.	Nation	Player
11	FW	SLO	Martin Pečar (on loan from (Germany) Eintracht Frankfurt)
33	DF	BRA	Lucas Galvão (from (Greece) Atromitos)

Out:

No.	Pos.	Nation	Player
—	DF	GAM	Maudo Jarjué (to (Sweden) Elfsborg, previously on loan)

=== Ried ===
In:

No.	Pos.	Nation	Player
18	FW	GER	Robin Ungerath (from (Germany) Wacker Burghausen)
23	DF	AUT	Josef Weberbauer (from Grazer AK)
45	FW	MLI	Dorgeles Nene (on loan from Red Bull Salzburg, previously on loan at Liefering)

Out:

No.	Pos.	Nation	Player
6	DF	AUT	Constantin Reiner (to (Poland) Piast Gliwice)
8	FW	BRA	Valdir (to Kapfenberger SV)
19	DF	AUT	Julian Turi (on loan to Vorwärts Steyr)
77	FW	BRA	Reinaldo (to SC Bregenz)
—	FW	AUT	Lukas Schlosser (on loan to (Germany) Wacker Burghausen)

=== SCR Altach ===
In:

No.	Pos.	Nation	Player
1	GK	AUT	Christoph Riegler (from St. Pölten)
7	FW	AUT	Christoph Monschein (on loan from LASK)
31	GK	AUT	Armin Gremsl (from (Romania) Craiova)
37	DF	FRA	Mickaël Nanizayamo (on loan from (Switzerland) Lausanne)
42	MF	MLI	Bakary Nimaga (from (Hungary) Zalaegerszeg)
55	MF	GER	Gianluca Gaudino (on loan from (Germany) SV Sandhausen)

Out:

No.	Pos.	Nation	Player
1	GK	AUT	Martin Kobras (to Rotenberg)
2	DF	GER	Berkay Dabanlı (to (Turkey) Kocaelispor)
7	MF	AUT	Mario Stefel (to Dornbirn)
22	FW	AUT	Amir Abdijanovic (on loan to Dornbirn)
—	DF	BRA	Anderson (to Austria Lustenau, previously on loan at Dornbirn)

=== Admira Wacker ===
In:

No.	Pos.	Nation	Player
18	MF	CZE	Jan Vodháněl (from (Czech Republic) Bohemians)
29	FW	BUL	Vladimir Nikolov (from (Germany) Würzburger Kickers)
31	DF	BRA	Luan (from (Greece) Ionikos)
77	DF	HUN	Sámuel Major (from Liefering)
86	FW	SRB	Stefano Surdanovic (from Blau-Weiß Linz)

Out:

No.	Pos.	Nation	Player
5	DF	AUT	Paul Koller (on loan to Grazer AK)
6	DF	AUT	Julian Buchta (on loan to Wacker Innsbruck)
16	FW	AUT	René Hellermann (to Imst)
17	DF	AUT	Stephan Auer (to First Vienna)
20	MF	AUT	Marco Kadlec (to Juniors OÖ)
24	FW	AUT	Marco Hausjell (to (Germany) Würzburger Kickers)
63	MF	AUT	Luca Kronberger (to Sturm Graz)
93	DF	CRO	Niko Datković (to (Spain) Mirandés)
98	MF	BRA	Patrick (on loan to (Azerbaijan) Gabala)

=== Austria Klagenfurt ===
In:

No.	Pos.	Nation	Player
11	MF	SLO	Rajko Rep (from (Romania) Sepsi OSK)
22	FW	AUT	Patrick Hasenhüttl (from (Germany) SpVgg Unterhaching)
29	GK	CHN	Liu Shaoziyang (on loan from (Germany) Bayern Munich Junior Team)
80	FW	AUT	Lukas Fridrikas (from Wacker Innsbruck)

Out:

No.	Pos.	Nation	Player
44	MF	AUT	Philipp Hütter (to Leoben)
92	MF	AUT	Fabio Markelic (on loan to Wacker Innsbruck)
—	FW	GER	Collin Quaner (retired)

== See also ==
- 2021–22 Austrian Football Bundesliga
