= 2023–24 SV Waldhof Mannheim season =

SV Waldhof Mannheim
2023–24 season
- Chairman: Bernd Beetz
- Manager: Rüdiger Rehm
- Stadium: Carl-Benz-Stadion
- 3. Liga: 16th
- Baden Cup: Quarter-finals
- Top goalscorer: League: Bentley Baxter Bahn; Terrence Boyd (5 each); All: Pascal Sohm (7)
- Average home league attendance: 10,389

The 2023–24 season is SV Waldhof Mannheim's 117th season in existence and fifth consecutive in the 3. Liga. They will also compete in the Baden Cup.

== Players ==
=== First-team squad ===
As of 29 August 2023

Note: Flags indicate national team as defined under FIFA eligibility rules; some limited exceptions apply. Players may hold more than one non-FIFA nationality.

No.	Pos.	Nation	Player
1	GK	GER	Jan-Christoph Bartels
3	DF	GER	Julian Riedel
4	DF	GER	Tim Sechelmann
5	DF	GER	Marcel Seegert (captain)
7	MF	GER	Bentley Baxter Bahn
8	MF	GER	Fridolin Wagner
9	FW	GRE	Minos Gouras
10	FW	GER	Pascal Sohm
11	FW	USA	Jalen Hawkins
15	DF	GER	Malte Karbstein
17	FW	GER	Samuel Abifade
18	DF	LUX	Laurent Jans
19	FW	GER	Jesaja Herrmann

No.	Pos.	Nation	Player
20	MF	GER	Per Lockl
21	MF	GER	Julian Rieckmann
22	FW	CGO	Yann Mabella
23	FW	AUT	Angelo Gattermayer
25	DF	GER	Luca Bolay
26	DF	ALG	Madéno Albenas
27	GK	GER	Malwin Zok
28	DF	GER	Jonas Carls
30	GK	GER	Lucien Hawryluk
32	FW	NGR	Kennedy Okpala
33	MF	TUR	Berkan Taz
36	FW	AUT	Kelvin Arase

== Transfers ==
=== In ===
Pos.	Player	Transferred from	Fee	Date	Source
DF	(Germany) Jonas Carls	(Germany) SC Paderborn	Free	1 July 2023	
MF	(Germany) Minos Gouras	(Germany) Jahn Regensburg	Free	1 July 2023	
MF	(Austria) Angelo Gattermayer	(Austria) Admira Wacker Mödling	Free	10 July 2023	
FW	(Republic of the Congo) Yann Mabella	(Belgium) Virton	Free	11 July 2023	

=== Out ===
Pos.	Player	Transferred to	Fee	Date	Source

== Pre-season and friendlies ==
Win Draw Loss Fixtures

7 July 2023 Friendly	Fortuna Heddesheim (Germany)	0–4	(Germany) Waldhof Mannheim
18:30 CEST (UTC+2)

8 July 2023 Friendly	Waldhof Mannheim (Germany)	2–2	(Germany) FSV Frankfurt
17:00 CEST (UTC+2)

15 July 2023 Friendly	Würzburger Kickers (Germany)	1–3	(Germany) Waldhof Mannheim
16:00 CEST (UTC+2)

22 July 2023 Friendly	Waldhof Mannheim (Germany)	0–2	(Germany) SV Elversberg
13:00 CEST (UTC+2)

29 July 2023 Friendly	Waldhof Mannheim (Germany)	0–1	(Germany) Eintracht Frankfurt II
14:00 CEST (UTC+2)

12 September 2023 Friendly	TSG Pfeddersheim (Germany)	1–5	(Germany) Waldhof Mannheim
18:00 CEST (UTC+2)

== Competitions ==
=== Overall record ===
Competition	First match	Last match	Starting round	Final position	Record							
Competition	First match	Last match	Starting round	Final position	Pld	W	D	L	GF	GA	GD	Win %
3. Liga	5 August 2023	18 May 2024	Matchday 1		35	10	9	16	46	55	−9	28.57
Baden Cup	9 August 2023	18 November 2023	Quarter-finals	Quarter-finals	3	2	0	1	13	4	+9	66.67
Total					38	12	9	17	59	59	+0	31.58

Last updated: 27 April 2024
Source: Soccerway

=== 3. Liga ===
==== League table ====
Pos	Team	Pld	W	D	L	GF	GA	GD	Pts	Promotion, qualification or relegation
14	Arminia Bielefeld	38	11	13	14	48	47	+1	46	
15	1860 Munich	38	13	7	18	40	42	−2	46	
16	Waldhof Mannheim	38	11	10	17	51	60	−9	43	
17	Hallescher FC (R)	38	11	7	20	50	68	−18	40	Relegation to Regionalliga
18	MSV Duisburg (R)	38	8	10	20	41	65	−24	34	Relegation to Regionalliga

Source: DFB
Rules for classification: 1) Points; 2) Goal difference; 3) Goals scored; 4) Head-to-head results; 5) Head-to-head away goals scored; 6) Away goals scored; 7) Play-off.
(R) Relegated

==== Results summary ====
Overall								Home						Away					
Pld	W	D	L	GF	GA	GD	Pts	W	D	L	GF	GA	GD	W	D	L	GF	GA	GD
35	10	9	16	46	55	−9	39	7	5	6	28	24	+4	3	4	10	18	31	−13

Last updated: 27 April 2024.

==== Results by round ====
Round	1	2	3	4	5	6	7	8	9	10	11	12	13	14	15	16	17
Ground	A	H	A	H	A	H	A	H	A	H	A	H	A	H	A	H	A
Result	L	D	L	W	W	L	D	W	L	D	L	L	L	D	L		
Position	20	17	19	15	9	12	14	12	14	14	16	17	17	17	18		

Updated to match(es) played on 27 April 2024. Source:
A = Away; H = Home; W = Win; D = Draw; L = Loss

==== Matches ====
The league fixtures were unveiled on 7 July 2023.

5 August 2023 1	1860 Munich	2–0	Waldhof Mannheim	Munich
14:00 CEST (UTC+2)				Stadium: Grünwalder Stadion; Attendance: 15,00; Referee: Tom Bauer

19 August 2023 2	Waldhof Mannheim	2–2	VfB Lübeck	Mannheim
16:30 CEST (UTC+2)				Stadium: Carl-Benz-Stadion; Attendance: 9,368; Referee: Marc Philip Eckermann

22 August 2023 3	Dynamo Dresden	2–1	Waldhof Mannheim	Dresden
19:00 CEST (UTC+2)				Stadium: Rudolf-Harbig-Stadion; Attendance: 26,747; Referee: Arne Aarnink

27 August 2023 4	Waldhof Mannheim	3–2	Hallescher FC	Mannheim
16:30 CEST (UTC+2)				Stadium: Carl-Benz-Stadion; Attendance: 7,907; Referee: Florian Badstübner

2 September 2023 5	Preußen Münster	1–3	Waldhof Mannheim	Münster
14:00 CEST (UTC+2)				Stadium: Preußenstadion; Attendance: 9,922; Referee: Cristian Ballweg

17 September 2023 6	Waldhof Mannheim	0–2	SSV Ulm	Mannheim
16:30 CEST (UTC+2)				Stadium: Carl-Benz-Stadion; Attendance: 10,101; Referee: Timo Gansloweit

23 September 2023 7	1. FC Saarbrücken	1–1	Waldhof Mannheim	Saarbrücken
14:00 CEST (UTC+2)	Brünker 88'		Herrmann 74'	Stadium: Ludwigsparkstadion; Attendance: 14,151; Referee: Alexander Sather

30 September 2023 8	Waldhof Mannheim	3–1	SC Freiburg II	Mannheim
14:00 CEST (UTC+2)				Stadium: Carl-Benz-Stadion; Attendance: 7,307; Referee: Felix Weller

4 October 2023 9	Jahn Regensburg	2–0	Waldhof Mannheim	Regensburg
19:00 CEST (UTC+2)				Stadium: Jahnstadion Regensburg; Attendance: 6,812; Referee: Konrad Oldhafer

7 October 2023 10	Waldhof Mannheim	1–1	Viktoria Köln	Mannheim
14:00 CEST (UTC+2)				Stadium: Carl-Benz-Stadion; Attendance: 7,156; Referee: Luca Jürgensen

14 October 2023 11	Arminia Bielefeld	3–1	Waldhof Mannheim	Bielefeld
16:30 CEST (UTC+2)	Boujellab 51'; Oppie 57'; Wintzheimer 76'		Arase 20'	Stadium: SchücoArena; Attendance: 16,061; Referee: Florian Lechner

20 October 2023 12	Waldhof Mannheim	1–3	Borussia Dortmund II	Mannheim
19:00 CEST (UTC+2)	Karbstein 27'		Hettwer 1'; Michel 14'; Pohlmann 69'	Stadium: Carl-Benz-Stadion; Attendance: 8,514; Referee: Tom Bauer

27 October 2023 13	SpVgg Unterhaching	3–0	Waldhof Mannheim	Unterhaching
19:00 CEST (UTC+2)	Hobsch 3' (pen.), 59'; Stiefler 74'			Stadium: Sportpark Unterhaching; Attendance: 3,600; Referee: Wolfgang Haslberger

5 November 2023 14	Waldhof Mannheim	0–0	MSV Duisburg	Mannheim
13:30 CET (UTC+1)				Stadium: Carl-Benz-Stadion

12 November 2023 15	Rot-Weiss Essen	2–0	Waldhof Mannheim	Essen
16:30 CET (UTC+1)	Obuz (penalty missed) 63', 74'; Harenbrock 68'			Stadium: Stadion an der Hafenstraße

24 November 2023 16	Waldhof Mannheim	v	SC Verl	Mannheim
19:00 CET (UTC+1)				Stadium: Carl-Benz-Stadion; Referee: Tobias Welz

2 December 2023 17	Waldhof Mannheim	v	FC Ingolstadt	Mannheim
14:00 CET (UTC+1)				Stadium: Carl-Benz-Stadion

=== Baden Cup ===
18 November 2023 Quarter-finals	SV Sandhausen	4–1	Waldhof Mannheim
--:-- CEST (UTC+2)
