= Joseph Ganda =

Joseph Ganda may refer to:

- Joseph Ganda (bishop)
- Joseph Ganda (footballer)
