= Vladimir Nikolov =

Vladimir Nikolov may refer to:

- Vladimir Nikolov (volleyball) (born 1977), Bulgarian former volleyball player
- Vladimir Nikolov (footballer) (born 2001), Bulgarian footballer
