= Dominik Starkl =

Austrian footballer (born 1993)

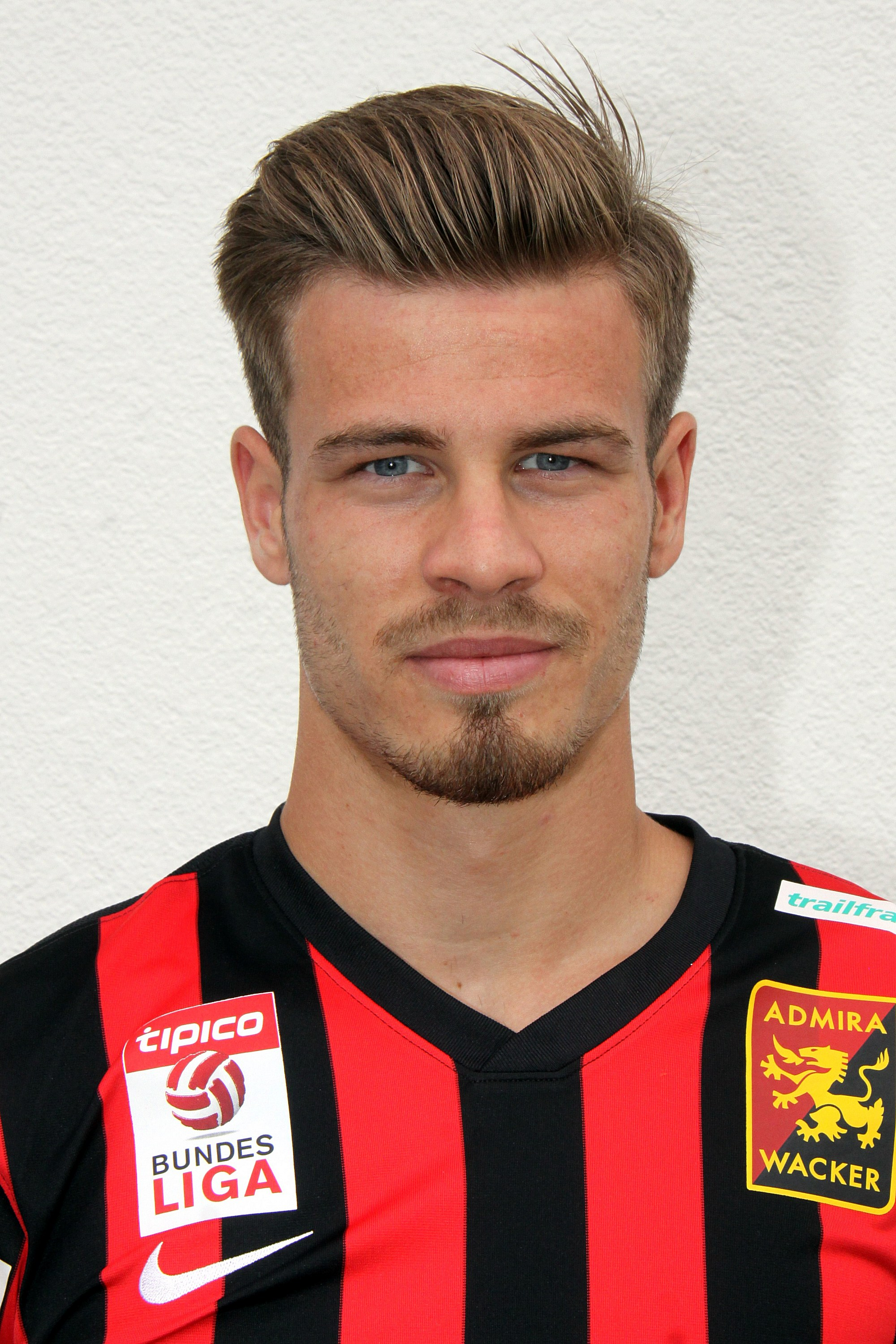
- Starkl with Admira Wacker in 2015

Personal information
- Date of birth: 6 November 1993 (age 33)
- Place of birth: Krems an der Donau, Austria
- Height: 1.76 m (5 ft 9 in)
- Position: Right winger

Team information
- Current team: Kremser SC
- Number: 77

Youth career
- 2001–2006: Kremser SC
- 2006–2007: SC Getzersdorf
- 2007–2011: SKN St. Pölten

Senior career*
Years	Team	Apps	(Gls)
2011–2016	Rapid Wien II	66	(27)
2012–2016	Rapid Wien	40	(3)
2015–2016	→ Admira Wacker (loan)	29	(5)
2016–2022	Admira Wacker	113	(9)
2022–2024	SKU Amstetten	48	(11)
2024–	Kremser SC	49	(14)

International career^{‡}
2010	Austria U18	2	(1)
2011	Austria U19	1	(0)
2013–2014	Austria U21	5	(1)
- * Club domestic league appearances and goals as of 28 June 2026 ‡ National team caps and goals as of 28 August 2015

Dominik Starkl (born 6 November 1993) is an Austrian professional footballer who plays as a right winger for Austrian Regionalliga East club Kremser SC.

== Club career ==
=== Early years ===
Starkl began his career at Kremser SC in Lower Austria. In 2006, he spent a season at SC Getzersdorf's youth academy before transferring to SKN St. Pölten, where he spent four years. His performances caught the attention of Rapid Wien, Austria's most successful club at the time, who signed him in 2011.

=== Rapid Wien ===
Starkl's strong start in Hütteldorf led to a quick promotion from the youth ranks to the reserve team. Reserve team coach Zoran Barisic handed him his debut on 9 August 2011 in a 2–1 win against SC Neusiedl am See, where he played 77 minutes. He made 25 appearances during the 2011–12 season, scoring 8 goals.

In 2012–13, Starkl moved to the first team. Under coach Peter Schöttel, he made his Bundesliga debut in November 2012 as a second-half substitute against Sturm Graz, where he assisted Guido Burgstaller in a 2–1 loss.

In the 2013–14 season, Starkl continued his development, scoring his first Austrian Bundesliga goal in a 3–0 win over Wacker Innsbruck. He added a crucial goal in a 2–2 draw against SV Grödig, helping Rapid recover from a 2–0 deficit. He also made his European debut, coming on as a substitute in a 1–1 draw against Genj in the UEFA Europa League.

=== Admira ===
On 15 June 2015, Starkl left Rapid Wien to join Admira Wacker on a season-long loan, with Admira holding an option to make the move permanent. The option was exercised in April 2016, and he signed a permanent contract. Over seven seasons with Admira, Starkl made 142 Bundesliga appearances and 23 in other competitions, scoring a total of 20 goals. He was part of the team that was relegated from the Bundesliga at the end of the 2021–22 season.

=== SKU Amstetten ===
Starkl signed with Austrian Second Division club SKU Amstetten ahead of the 2022–23 season, penning a contract until June 2024. He made his competitive debut for the club on 15 July 2022 in a 4–0 win in the Austrian Cup over SR Donaufeld Wien. The following week he scored on his league debut for Amstetten, as they beat Kapfenberger SV 3–0 on the first matchday of the season.

=== Return to Kremser SC ===
In July 2024, Starkl returned to his childhood club, Kremser SC, which competed in the Austrian Regionalliga East.

== International career ==
Starkl represented Austria at the under-18 and under-19 levels and made five appearances for the Austria U21 team, scoring in a 2–0 friendly win against Turkey U21 on 14 November 2013.

== Personal life ==
His brother Sebastian Starkl is also a former professional footballer.
