= Angelo Gattermayer =

Austrian footballer (born 2002)

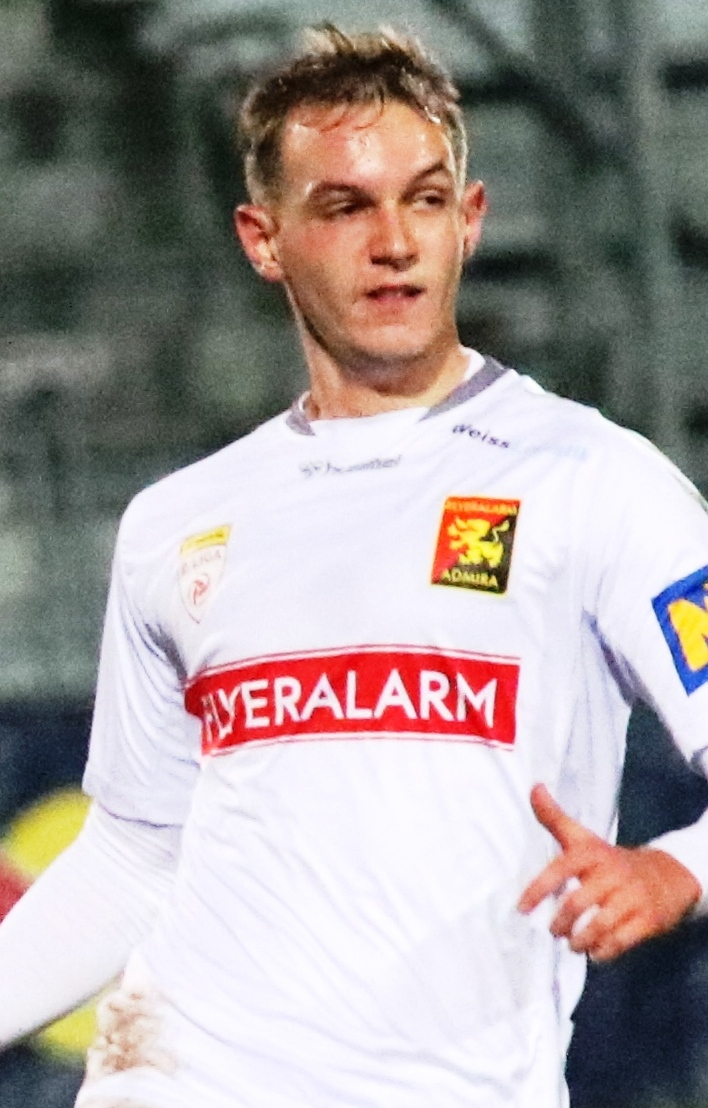
- Gattermayer in 2022

Personal information
- Date of birth: 6 June 2002 (age 24)
- Place of birth: Vienna, Austria
- Height: 1.82 m (6 ft 0 in)
- Position: Winger

Team information
- Current team: TSV Hartberg
- Number: 7

Youth career
- 2008–2014: Austria Wien
- 2014–2016: Floridsdorfer AC
- 2016–2021: Admira Wacker

Senior career*
Years	Team	Apps	(Gls)
2020–2022	Admira II	16	(6)
2021–2023	Admira Wacker	39	(6)
2023–2024	Waldhof Mannheim	1	(0)
2024	→ SKU Amstetten (loan)	14	(3)
2024–2026	Wolfsberger AC	55	(5)
2026–	TSV Hartberg	3	(0)

International career
2023–2024	Austria U21	5	(0)
- * Club domestic league appearances and goals as of 16 August 2026

Angelo Gattermayer (born 6 June 2002) is an Austrian professional footballer who plays as a winger for Austrian Bundesliga club TSV Hartberg.

== Club career ==
Gattermayer began his youth career with Austria Wien before joining Floridsdorfer AC in March 2014. Ahead of the 2016–17 season, he moved to the academy of Admira Wacker. He made his debut for Admira's reserve team in the Regionalliga in October 2020 against FC Mauerwerk, making two appearances before the season was cancelled due to the COVID-19 pandemic.

In May 2021, he made his professional first-team debut in the Austrian Bundesliga, coming on as a substitute for Josef Ganda in the 81st minute against Rheindorf Altach on matchday 32 of the 2020–21 season. He made 14 top-flight appearances before Admira's relegation to the 2. Liga in 2022. In the 2022–23 season, he made 25 appearances and scored six goals.

Ahead of the 2023–24 season, Gattermayer moved to Germany, joining 3. Liga club Waldhof Mannheim. He made his debut on the opening matchday in a 2–0 defeat to 1860 Munich but did not feature again. In February 2024, he returned to Austria on loan to 2. Liga side SKU Amstetten, where he made 14 league appearances and scored three goals.

On 16 July 2024, Gattermayer signed a two-year contract with Austrian Bundesliga club Wolfsberger AC. He cited manager Dietmar Kühbauer's belief in him as a key factor in his decision, stating that he was determined to prove himself again at the top level. In March 2025, Gattermayer scored the deciding goal in the final of the 2024–25 Austrian Cup, helping Wolfsberger AC to their first ever cup title.

== Personal life ==
Gattermayer has drawn comparisons to Marko Arnautović due to his expressive style of play and strong personality. He has also cited Cristiano Ronaldo as his footballing idol, admiring his versatility and work ethic.

== Career statistics ==
As of match played 8 November 2025

Appearances and goals by club, season and competition
Club	Season	League			National cup		Other		Total	
Club	Season	Division	Apps	Goals	Apps	Goals	Apps	Goals	Apps	Goals
Admira II	2020–21	Regionalliga East	2	0	—		—		2	0
Admira II	2021–22	Regionalliga East	14	6	—		—		14	6
Admira II	Total		16	6	—		—		16	6
Admira Wacker	2020–21	Austrian Bundesliga	1	0	0	0	—		1	0
Admira Wacker	2021–22	Austrian Bundesliga	13	0	0	0	—		13	0
Admira Wacker	2022–23	2. Liga	25	6	2	0	—		27	6
Admira Wacker	Total		39	6	2	0	—		41	6
Waldhof Mannheim	2023–24	3. Liga	1	0	0	0	—		1	0
SKU Amstetten (loan)	2023–24	2. Liga	14	3	0	0	—		14	3
Wolfsberger AC	2024–25	Austrian Bundesliga	27	3	6	3	—		33	6
Wolfsberger AC	2025–26	Austrian Bundesliga	13	1	2	2	4 (Note: Two appearances in UEFA Europa League, two appearances in UEFA Conference League)	0	19	3
Wolfsberger AC	Total		40	4	8	5	4	0	52	9
Career total			110	19	10	5	4	0	124	24
