= Walter Peintinger =

Austrian footballer and manager

Personal information
- Date of birth: 24 May 1945 (age 81)
- Place of birth: Austria
- Position: Midfielder

Senior career*
Years	Team	Apps	(Gls)
1965–1967	WSV Donawitz		
1967–1975	SK Sturm Graz	126	(33)

Managerial career
- 1980–1982: Kapfenberger SV
- 1984–1985: ASK Voitsberg
- 1986–1987: SV Leibnitz Flavia Solva
- 1993: DFC LUV Graz
- * Club domestic league appearances and goals

Walter Peintinger (born 24 May 1945) is an Austrian football manager and former player.
