= Sebastian Starkl =

Austrian footballer (born 1996)

Personal information
- Date of birth: 21 January 1996 (age 30)
- Place of birth: Krems an der Donau, Austria
- Height: 1.80 m (5 ft 11 in)
- Position: Midfielder

Team information
- Current team: FC Rohrendorf
- Number: 11

Youth career
- Kremser SC
- 2009–2010: Rapid Wien
- 2010–2014: SKN St. Pölten

Senior career*
Years	Team	Apps	(Gls)
2014–2016	SKN St. Pölten II	47	(1)
2014–2016	SKN St. Pölten	1	(0)
2016–2017	Kremser SC	28	(0)
2017–2018	FC Rohrendorf	24	(3)
2018–2023	Kremser SC	91	(10)
2024–	FC Rohrendorf	0	(0)

International career
2011	Austria U16	1	(0)
2014	Austria U18	2	(0)
- * Club domestic league appearances and goals as of 23:50, 30 March 2024 (UTC)

Sebastian Starkl (born 21 January 1996) is an Austrian footballer who plays for FC Rohrendorf. His brother Dominik Starkl is also a professional footballer.
