= Jonathan Nanizayamo =

French footballer (born 1992)

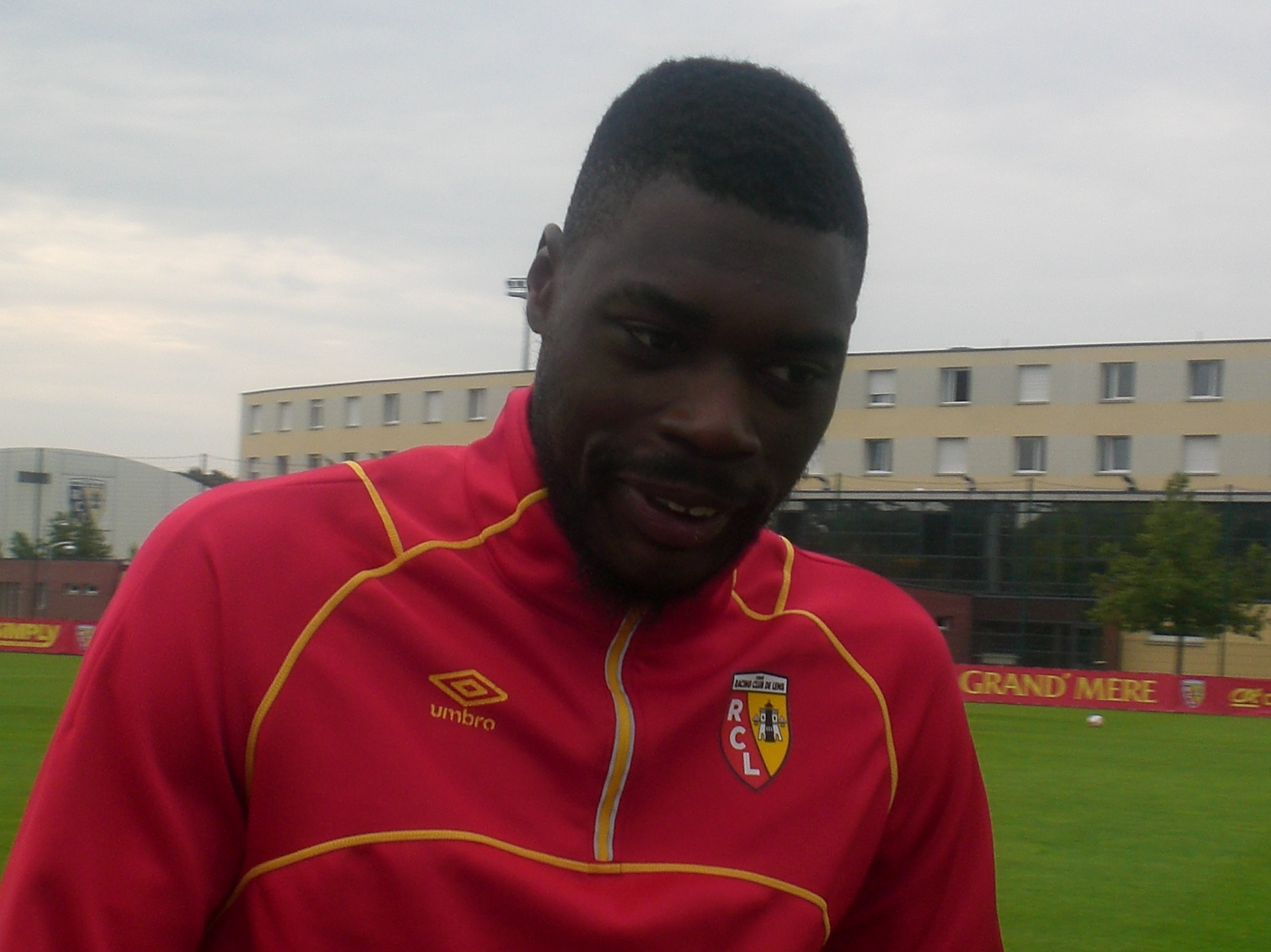

Personal information
- Date of birth: February 21, 1992 (age 34)
- Place of birth: Tours, France
- Height: 1.94 m (6 ft 4 1/2 in)
- Position: Forward

Team information
- Current team: Union Titus Pétange
- Number: 40

Youth career
- 2006–2009: Rennes
- 2009–2010: Nantes

Senior career*
Years	Team	Apps	(Gls)
2010–2014	Real Sociedad B	55	(2)
2014–2015	Vereya	7	(3)
2015	Tours	7	(1)
2015–2016	Lens	19	(3)
2016–2017	Paris FC	22	(3)
2017	Gangwon FC	4	(0)
2018–2019	Quevilly-Rouen	27	(4)
2019–2020	Tubize	7	(0)
2020–	Union Titus Pétange	7	(1)
- * Club domestic league appearances and goals as of 13:30, 24 November 2020 (UTC)

Jonathan Nanizayamo (born 21 February 1992) is a French footballer who plays for Union Titus Pétange as a forward.

== Personal life ==
Nanizayamo is of Burundian and DR Congolese descent. He is the older brother of Ange Nanizayamo.
