= Christoph Haas =

Austrian association footballer

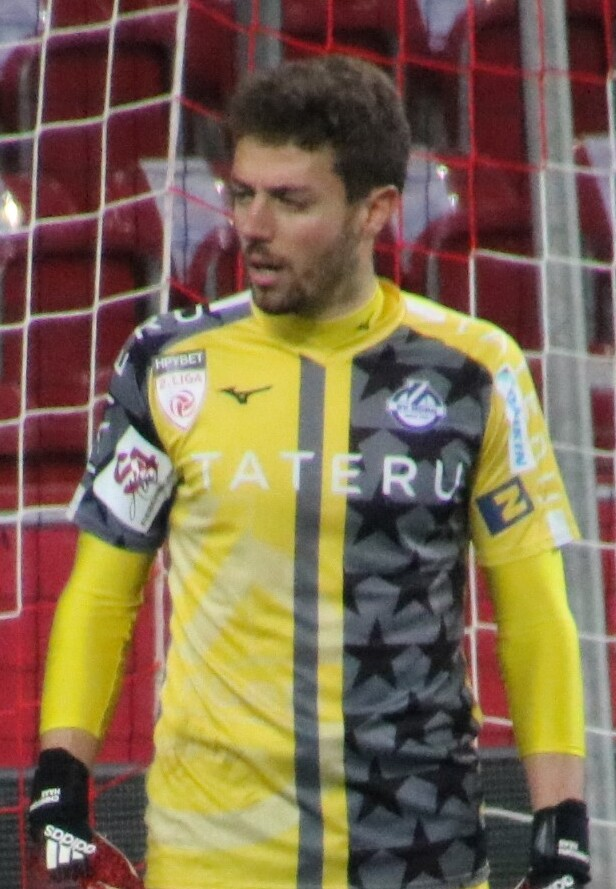
- Haas in 2019

Personal information
- Date of birth: 23 June 1992 (age 34)
- Place of birth: Vienna, Austria
- Height: 1.90 m (6 ft 3 in)
- Position: Goalkeeper

Team information
- Current team: Rapid Wien II
- Number: 1

Youth career
- 1999–2006: SV Gerasdorf/Stammersdorf
- 2006–2007: Stadlau
- 2007–2010: Waidhofen/Ybbs

Senior career*
Years	Team	Apps	(Gls)
2010–2011	Waidhofen/Ybbs	15	(0)
2011–2012	Vorwärts Steyr	29	(0)
2012–2013	Amstetten	6	(0)
2013–2014	Ober-Grafendorf	14	(0)
2014–2018	Rapid Wien II	34	(0)
2017–2019	Rapid Wien	0	(0)
2019	Horn	15	(0)
2019–2020	Admira Wacker II	6	(0)
2019–2021	Admira Wacker	0	(0)
2021–2022	Ried	2	(0)
2022–2024	Admira Wacker	45	(0)
2024–	Rapid Wien II	3	(0)
- * Club domestic league appearances and goals as of 17 May 2026

Christoph Haas (born 23 June 1992) is an Austrian professional footballer who plays as a goalkeeper for Rapid Wien II.

== Career ==
Haas is a product of the youth academies of SV Gerasdorf/Stammersdorf, Stadlau, and Waidhofen/Ybbs. In 2010, he began his senior career with Waidhofen/Ybbs and followed that up with a move to Vorwärts Steyr. He had stints at Amstetten and Ober-Grafendorf before joining the reserves of Rapid Wien. He occasionally acted as the third goalkeeper for Rapid Wien's main squad.

In 2019, Haas had a stint at Horn in the 2. Liga on 22 February 2019 where he made his professional debut. He moved to Admira Wacker on 4 July 2019 where he again acted as backup goalkeeper. He transferred to the Austrian Football Bundesliga club Ried on 14 June 2021 where he made 2 appearances. He returned to Admira Wacker on 21 June 2022, signing a contract until June 2024.

On 21 June 2024, Haas signed a two-season contract with Rapid Wien for their reserve team Rapid Wien II in 2. Liga.

== Personal life ==
Haas married presenter Kimberly Budinsky in June 2022.
