= Filip Ristanic =

Austrian footballer

Personal information
- Date of birth: 30 January 2004 (age 22)
- Place of birth: Austria
- Height: 1.81 m (5 ft 11 in)
- Position: Forward

Team information
- Current team: Admira Wacker
- Number: 22

Youth career
- 2013–2017: SV Wienerberg
- 2017–2020: Admira Wacker

Senior career*
Years	Team	Apps	(Gls)
2020–2021	Admira Wacker II	7	(0)
2020–	Admira Wacker	90	(15)

International career^{‡}
2018–2019	Austria U15	10	(3)
2019–2020	Austria U16	9	(3)
2020	Austria U17	1	(0)
2022	Austria U18	4	(1)
- * Club domestic league appearances and goals as of 17 May 2026 ‡ National team caps and goals as of 10:28, 23 June 2022 (UTC)

Filip Ristanic (born 30 January 2004) is an Austrian footballer who plays for Admira Wacker as a forward.

== Club career ==
Ristanic began playing football for SV Wienerberg. In July 2017 he joined Admira Wacker. On 28 August 2020 he made his Austrian Cup debut for Admira Wacker team against WSC Hertha. On 24 July 2021 he made his Bundesliga debut against WSG Tirol.

== International career ==
Ristanic has played internationally for Austria at under-15, under-16 and under-17 levels.
