= Pascal Petlach =

Austrian footballer (born 1999)

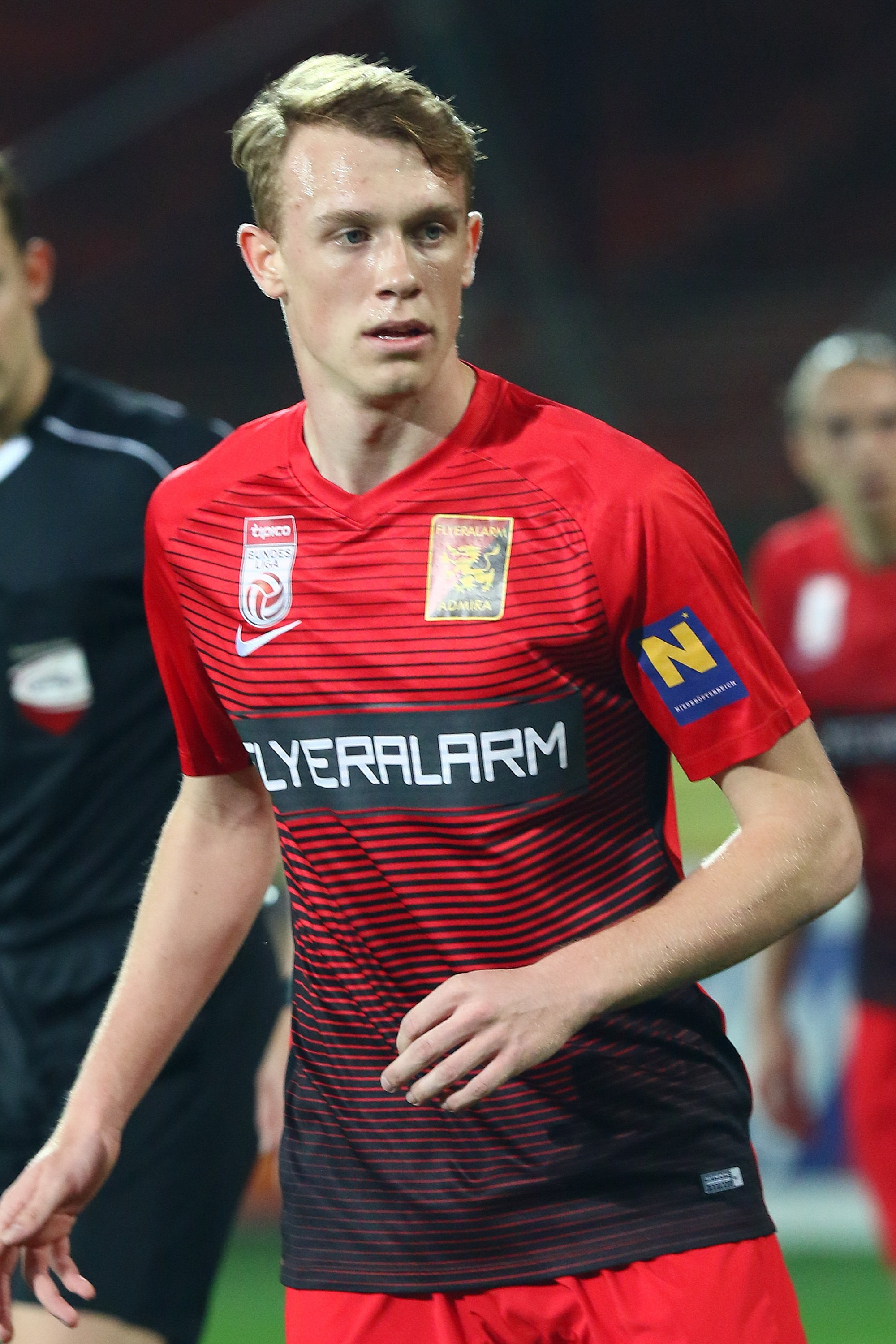
- Pascal Petlach with Admira Wacker in 2018

Personal information
- Date of birth: 18 January 1999 (age 27)
- Place of birth: Schönau an der Triesting, Austria
- Height: 1.84 m (6 ft 0 in)
- Position: Centre-back

Team information
- Current team: 1. SV Wiener Neudorf
- Number: 12

Youth career
- Admira Wacker

Senior career*
Years	Team	Apps	(Gls)
2017–2021	Admira Wacker	28	(1)
2021–2022	FCM Traiskirchen	7	(2)
2023	1. Wiener Neustädter SC	10	(0)
2024–	1. SV Wr. Neudorf	9	(0)

International career^{‡}
2017	Austria U19	1	(0)
- * Club domestic league appearances and goals as of 06:18, 23 October 2024 (UTC) ‡ National team caps and goals as of 24 December 2017

Pascal Petlach (born 18 January 1999) is an Austrian footballer who plays as a centre-back for sixth-tier Gebietsliga Süd/Südost club 1. SV Wr. Neudorf.

== Club career ==
On 28 July 2021, he joined FCM Traiskirchen in the Austrian Regionalliga East.

In July 2024, Petlach joined 1. SV Wr. Neudorf of the sixth-tier Gebietsliga Süd/Südost after a one-year hiatus from football.
