= Onurhan Babuşcu =

Austrian footballer (born 2003)

Personal information
- Date of birth: 5 September 2003 (age 23)
- Place of birth: Baden bei Wien, Austria
- Height: 1.76 m (5 ft 9 in)
- Position: Midfielder

Team information
- Current team: SV Lafnitz
- Number: 23

Youth career
- 2009–2011: ASK Bad Vöslau
- 2011–2020: Admira Wacker

Senior career*
| Years | Team | Apps | (Gls) |
| 2020–2022 | Admira Wacker II | 3 | (0) |
| 2020–2022 | Admira Wacker | 14 | (2) |
| 2022–2025 | Gaziantep | 2 | (0) |
| 2024 | → TSV Hartberg (loan) | 0 | (0) |
| 2025–2026 | Admira Panthers | 21 | (3) |
| 2026– | SV Lafnitz | 3 | (1) |

International career^{‡}
| 2017 | Austria U15 | 1 | (0) |
| 2018–2019 | Austria U16 | 11 | (4) |
| 2019 | Austria U17 | 5 | (0) |
| 2021–2022 | Austria U19 | 6 | (0) |
- * Club domestic league appearances and goals as of 08:56, 5 November 2026 (UTC) ‡ National team caps and goals as of 28 June 2022

Onurhan Babuşcu (born 5 September 2003) is an Austrian professional footballer who plays as a midfielder for Austrian Regionalliga South club SV Lafnitz.

== Club career ==
On 16 August 2022, Babuşcu signed a four-year contract with Gaziantep in Turkey.

On 6 February 2024, Babuşcu joined TSV Hartberg on loan until the end of the year, with an option to extend. Despite the move, he did not make a single appearance or feature in any matchday squads during the second half of the 2023–24 season under head coach Markus Schopp. In September 2024, Hartberg's director of football, Erich Korherr, addressed Babuşcu's limited playing prospects, stating: "We need to find out what the best solution is for him. It won't be at Hartberg."

== International career ==
Born in Austria, Babuşcu is of Turkish descent. He is a youth international for Austria.

== Career statistics ==
=== Club ===
As of 7 June 2020.

Appearances and goals by club, season and competition
| Club | Season | League | | | Cup | | Continental | | Other | | Total | |
| Club | Season | Division | Apps | Goals | Apps | Goals | Apps | Goals | Apps | Goals | Apps | Goals |
|---|---|---|---|---|---|---|---|---|---|---|---|---|
| Admira II | 2019–20 | Regionalliga | 1 | 0 | 0 | 0 | – | | 0 | 0 | 1 | 0 |
| Admira | 2019–20 | Bundesliga | 1 | 0 | 0 | 0 | – | | 0 | 0 | 1 | 0 |
| Career total | | | 2 | 0 | 0 | 0 | 0 | 0 | 0 | 0 | 2 | 0 |
