= Andreas Leitner =

Austrian footballer (born 1994)

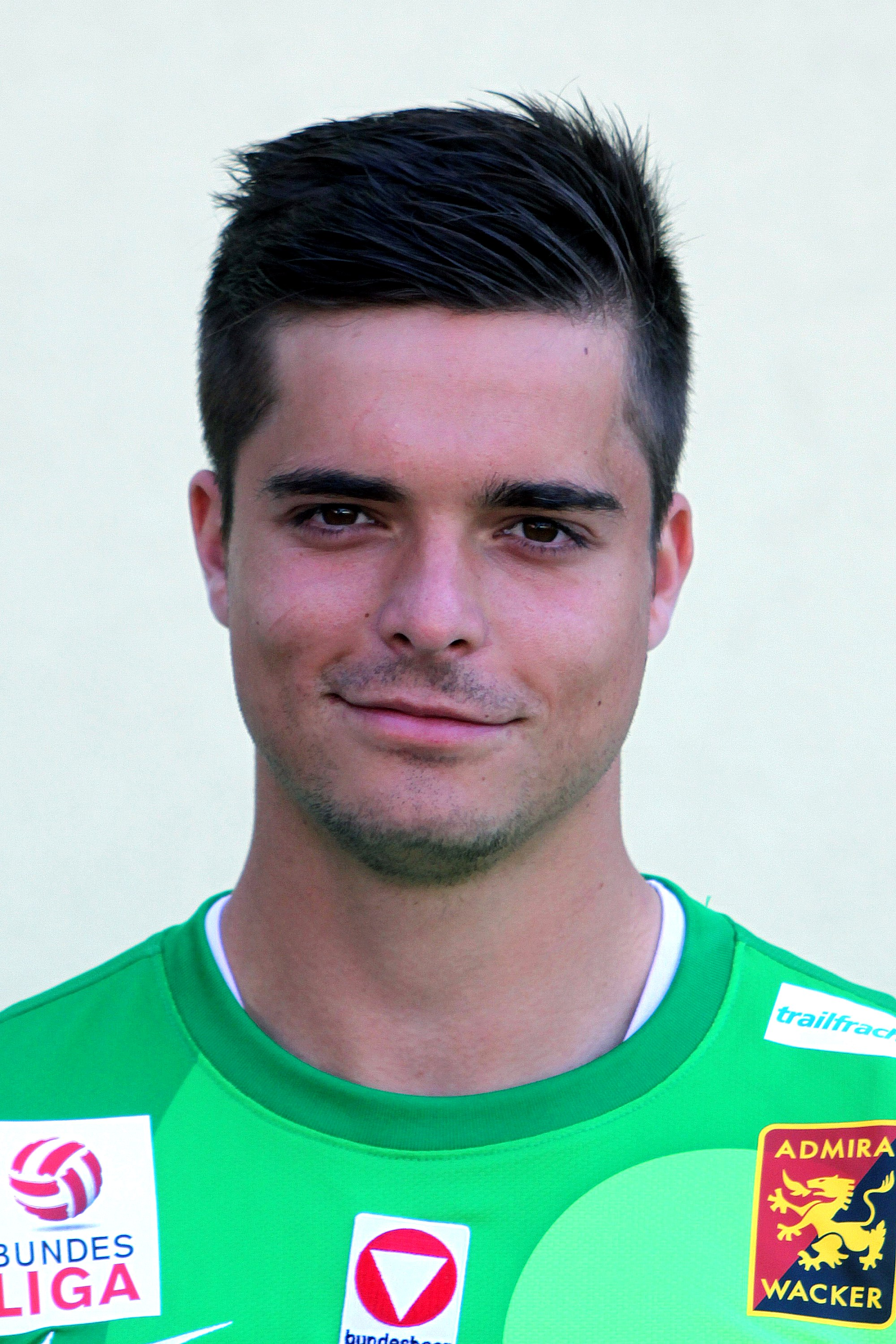
- Leitner with Admira Wacker in 2013

Personal information
- Date of birth: 25 March 1994 (age 32)
- Place of birth: Leoben, Austria
- Height: 1.84 m (6 ft 0 in)
- Position: Goalkeeper

Team information
- Current team: SV Ried
- Number: 1

Youth career
- 2000–2007: SV Breitenau
- 2007–2008: Sturm Graz
- 2008: SV Breitenau
- 2008: Wiener Neustadt
- 2008–2009: Austria Wien
- 2009–2011: Admira Wacker

Senior career*
Years	Team	Apps	(Gls)
2011–2016	Admira Wacker II	45	(0)
2011–2022	Admira Wacker	213	(0)
2015–2016	→ Austria Klagenfurt (loan)	4	(0)
2022–2023	Petrolul Ploiești	11	(0)
2023–	SV Ried	91	(0)

International career
2009–2010	Austria U16	4	(0)
2010	Austria U17	5	(0)
2011	Austria U18	1	(0)
2012–2013	Austria U19	5	(0)
2014	Austria U21	2	(0)
- * Club domestic league appearances and goals as of 10 June 2026

Andreas Leitner (born 25 March 1994) is an Austrian professional footballer who plays as a goalkeeper for 2. Liga club SV Ried.

== Biography ==
Leitner began his career at SV Breitenau in Styria. In 2007, he moved to SK Sturm Graz, which he left one season later for the youth team of SC Wiener Neustadt. In 2009, he played for the FK Austria Wien youth team before joining the youth team of FC Admira Wacker Mödling.

In 2011 he was called up to the squad of the second team, which plays in the Regionalliga Ost. He made his debut on March 18, 2011, against SC Neusiedl am See, when the goalkeeper played the whole game. In his first full season, Leitner made 15 appearances. He then became the second goalkeeper for the first team and made his Bundesliga debut under coach Dietmar Kühbauer on December 1, 2012. In the game against SV Mattersburg he came on for Lukas Thürauer in the 45th minute after regular goalkeeper Patrick Tischler received a red card. The game in the Mattersburg Pappelstadion ended in a 3–0 defeat.

== Club career ==
From 2011 to 2022, Leitner played for Admira Wacker. During the 2015–16 season, he was sent on loan to Austria Klagenfurt.

On 14 September 2022, after 11 years at Admira Wacker, Leitner moved abroad for the first time by agreeing to a two-year deal with Romanian club Petrolul Ploiești.

He returned to Austria on 25 June 2023, after being transferred by 2. Liga team SV Ried for an undisclosed fee.

== Honours ==
Admira Wacker

- ÖFB Cup runner-up: 2015–16
