= Malte Karbstein =

German footballer

Personal information
- Date of birth: 30 January 1998 (age 28)
- Place of birth: Neuruppin, Germany
- Height: 1.90 m (6 ft 3 in)
- Position: Centre-back

Team information
- Current team: Jahn Regensburg
- Number: 44

Youth career
- 2006–2011: MSV Neuruppin
- 2011–2017: Energie Cottbus

Senior career*
| Years | Team | Apps | (Gls) |
| 2016–2018 | Energie Cottbus | 35 | (2) |
| 2016 | Energie Cottbus II | 1 | (0) |
| 2018–2020 | Werder Bremen II | 33 | (3) |
| 2020–2022 | Kickers Offenbach | 48 | (7) |
| 2022–2026 | Waldhof Mannheim | 64 | (3) |
| 2026– | Jahn Regensburg | 14 | (2) |
- * Club domestic league appearances and goals as of 14:57, 26 September 2026 (UTC)

Malte Karbstein (born 30 January 1998) is a German professional footballer who plays as a centre-back for Jahn Regensburg.

== Career ==
Born in Neuruppin, Karbstein played in the youth teams of local side MSV Neuruppin before joining Energie Cottbus in 2011. He played 65 matches for the Energie Cottbus youth teams.

Starting with the 2015–16 season, he trained with Energie Cottbus' first team making two appearances in the 3. Liga. Over the following two seasons, he played 33 matches in the Regionalliga Nord. After the club's promotion to the 3. Liga, he made the squad for the first five matches but did not feature while appearing once in the regional cup competition.

In August 2018, Karbstein joined Werder Bremen II for an undisclosed fee.

In June 2020, it was announced Karbstein would move to Kickers Offenbach for the 2020–21 season.

In January 2026, Karbstein left Waldhof Mannheim in order to join Jahn Regensburg.
