= Jan Vodháněl =

Czech footballer

Personal information
- Date of birth: 25 April 1997 (age 29)
- Place of birth: Mladá Boleslav, Czech Republic
- Height: 1.75 m (5 ft 9 in)
- Positions: Left midfielder; right midfielder

Team information
- Current team: Nestos Chrysoupoli

Youth career
- Mladá Boleslav

Senior career*
Years	Team	Apps	(Gls)
2016–2017	Mladá Boleslav	2	(0)
2017	→ FK Pardubice (loan)	0	(0)
2017–2019	Vlašim	29	(5)
2018	→ Bohemians 1905 (loan)	13	(0)
2019–2021	Bohemians 1905	41	(5)
2022	Admira Wacker	14	(1)
2022–2025	Sigma Olomouc	59	(8)
2025–2026	Niki Volos	6	(0)
2026–	Nestos Chrysoupoli	0	(0)

International career
2017–2018	Czech Republic U20	6	(1)
- * Club domestic league appearances and goals as of 21 December 2025

Jan Vodháněl (born 25 April 1997) is a Czech professional footballer who plays as a midfielder for Super League Greece 2 club Nestos Chrysoupoli.

== Career ==
He made his senior league debut for FK Mladá Boleslav on 9 April 2016 in a Czech First League 2–2 home draw against Dukla Prague.

In December 2021, Vodháněl signed a long-term contract with Admira Wacker in Austria. He left the club in July 2022 after relegation from the Austrian Football Bundesliga.

In July 2022, Vodháněl signed a two-year contract with Sigma Olomouc.

On 5 September 2025, Vodháněl signed a contract with Super League Greece 2 club Niki Volos.
