= Mickaël Nanizayamo =

French footballer (born 1998)

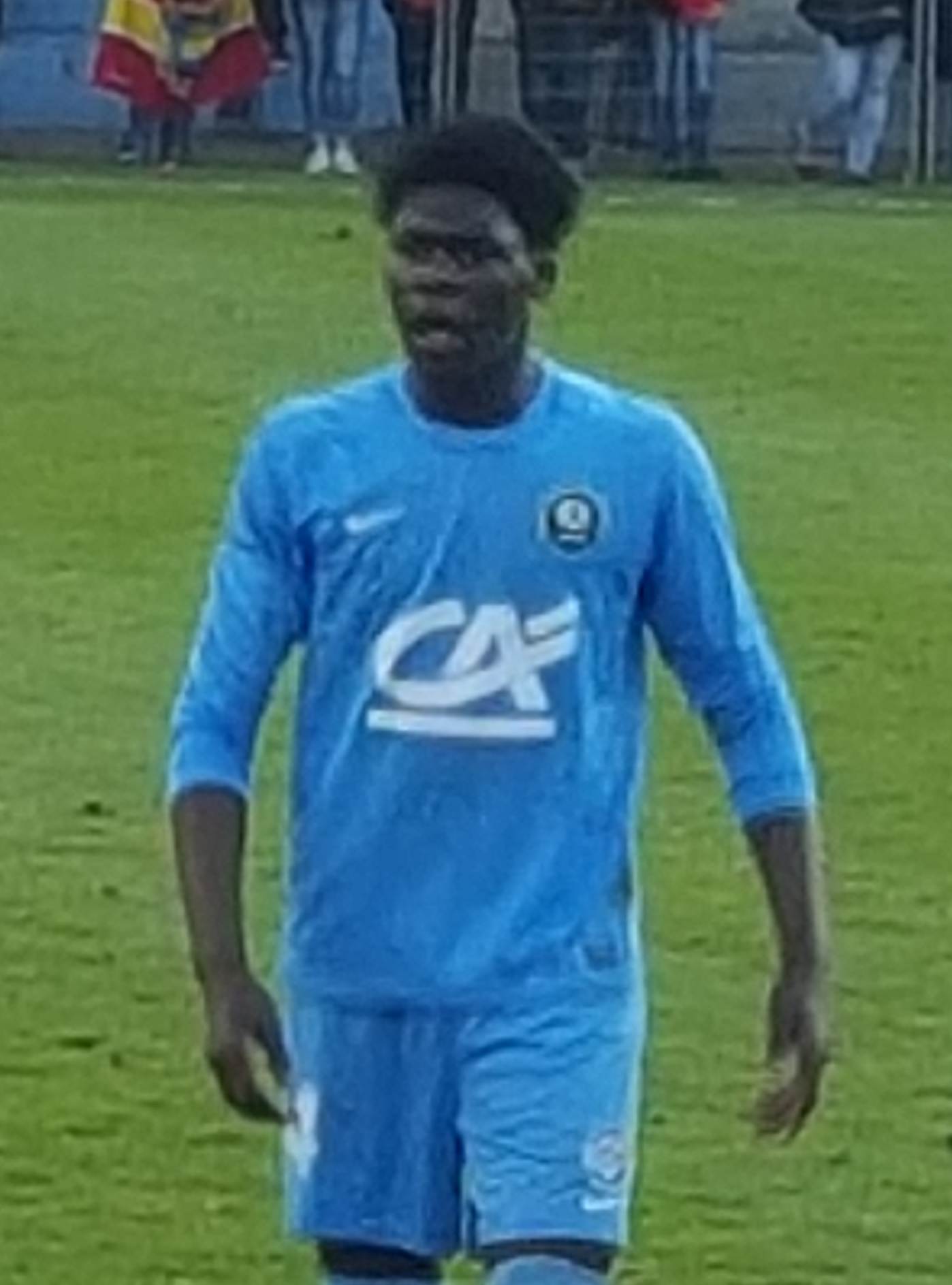
- Nanizayamo with Tours B in 2016

Personal information
- Full name: Mickaël Ange Nanizayamo
- Date of birth: 8 May 1998 (age 28)
- Place of birth: Tours, France
- Height: 1.94 m (6 ft 4 in)
- Position: Centre-back

Team information
- Current team: Lausanne Ouchy
- Number: 37

Youth career
- 2006–2015: Tours

Senior career*
| Years | Team | Apps | (Gls) |
| 2015–2018 | Tours B | 28 | (0) |
| 2016–2018 | Tours | 4 | (0) |
| 2018–2019 | Team Vaud U21 | 12 | (1) |
| 2018–2024 | Lausanne-Sport | 68 | (2) |
| 2022 | → Rheindorf Altach (loan) | 11 | (1) |
| 2025– | Lausanne Ouchy | 4 | (0) |

International career
| 2017 | France U20 | 1 | (0) |
- * Club domestic league appearances and goals as of 1 July 2025

Mickaël Ange Nanizayamo (born 8 May 1998) is a French professional footballer who plays as a centre-back for Lausanne Ouchy.

== Club career ==
On 23 January 2022, Nanizayamo joined SCR Altach in Austria on loan.

== Personal life ==
Nanizayamo is of Burundian and DR Congolese descent. He is the younger brother of Jonathan Nanizayamo.
