= Luca Kronberger =

Austrian footballer

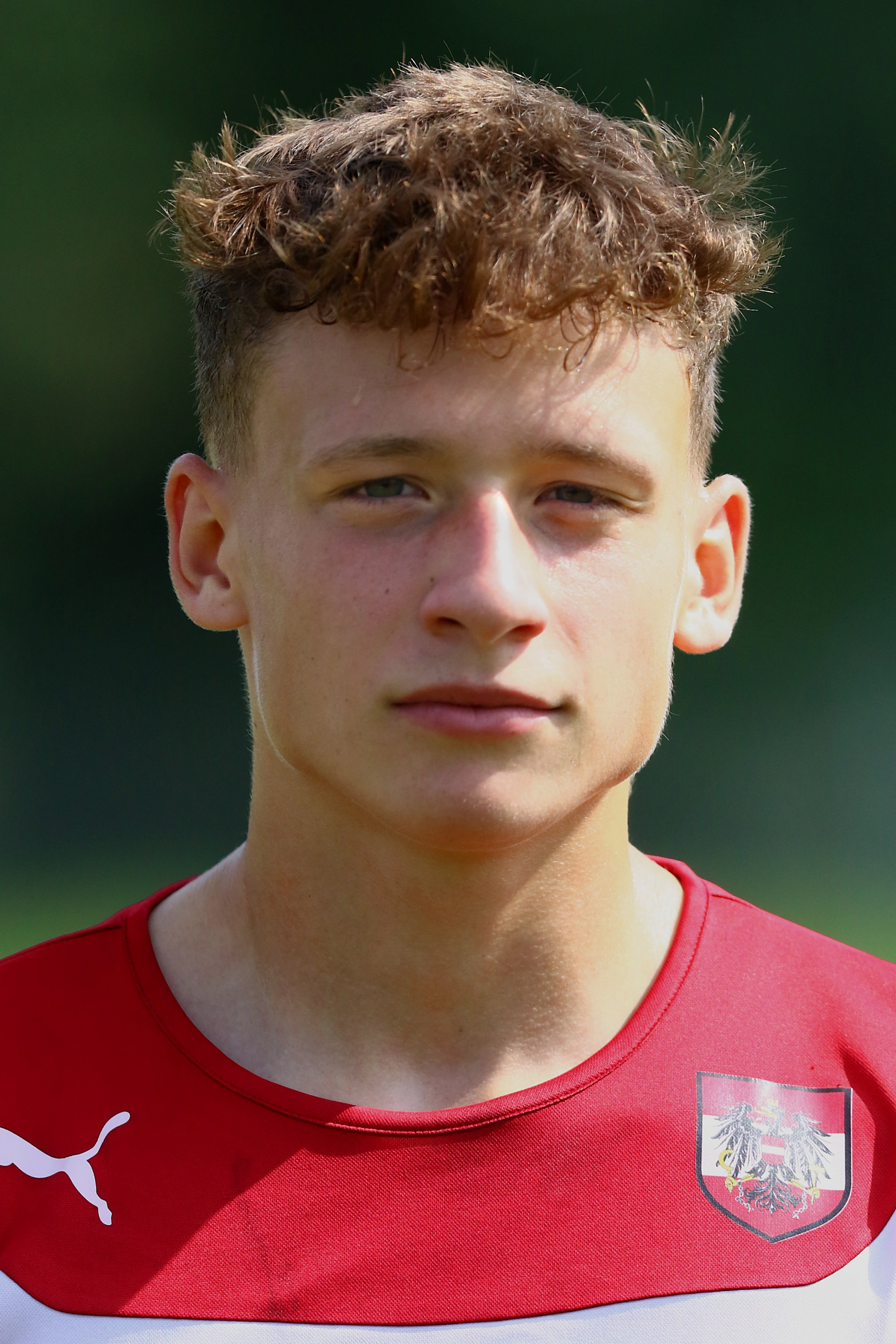

Personal information
- Date of birth: 15 February 2002 (age 24)
- Place of birth: Schwarzach im Pongau, Austria
- Height: 1.79 m (5 ft 10 in)
- Position: Midfielder

Youth career
- 2009–2013: TSV St. Johann
- 2013–2020: Admira

Senior career*
Years	Team	Apps	(Gls)
2019–2020	Admira II	19	(7)
2020–2022	Admira	40	(1)
2022–2024	Sturm Graz	8	(0)
2022–2024	Sturm Graz II	4	(0)
2022–2023	→ SV Ried (loan)	16	(0)
2023–2024	→ WSG Tirol (loan)	23	(3)
2024–2026	Rheindorf Altach	12	(0)

International career^{‡}
2018	Austria U17	4	(0)
2019–2020	Austria U18	6	(1)
2021–2022	Austria U21	8	(1)
- * Club domestic league appearances and goals as of 10 June 2026 ‡ National team caps and goals as of 21 November 2022

Luca Kronberger (born 15 February 2002) is an Austrian footballer who plays as a midfielder.

== Club career ==
On 16 December 2021, Kronberger agreed to join Sturm Graz on a 3.5-year contract.

On 23 June 2023, Kronberger moved on loan to WSG Tirol.

On 5 July 2024, Kronberger signed a two-year contract with Rheindorf Altach.

== Career statistics ==
=== Club ===
As of 8 November 2020.

Appearances and goals by club, season and competition
Club	Season	League			Cup		Continental		Other		Total	
Club	Season	Division	Apps	Goals	Apps	Goals	Apps	Goals	Apps	Goals	Apps	Goals
Admira II	2019–20	Regionalliga	13	4	–		–		0	0	13	4
Admira II	2020–21	Regionalliga	6	3	–		–		0	0	6	3
Admira II	Total		19	7	0	0	0	0	0	0	19	7
Admira	2020–21	Bundesliga	1	0	1 (Note: Appearances in the Austrian Cup)	0	–		0	0	2	0
Career total			20	7	1	0	0	0	0	0	21	7
