= Vladimir Nikolov (footballer) =

Bulgarian footballer (born 2001)

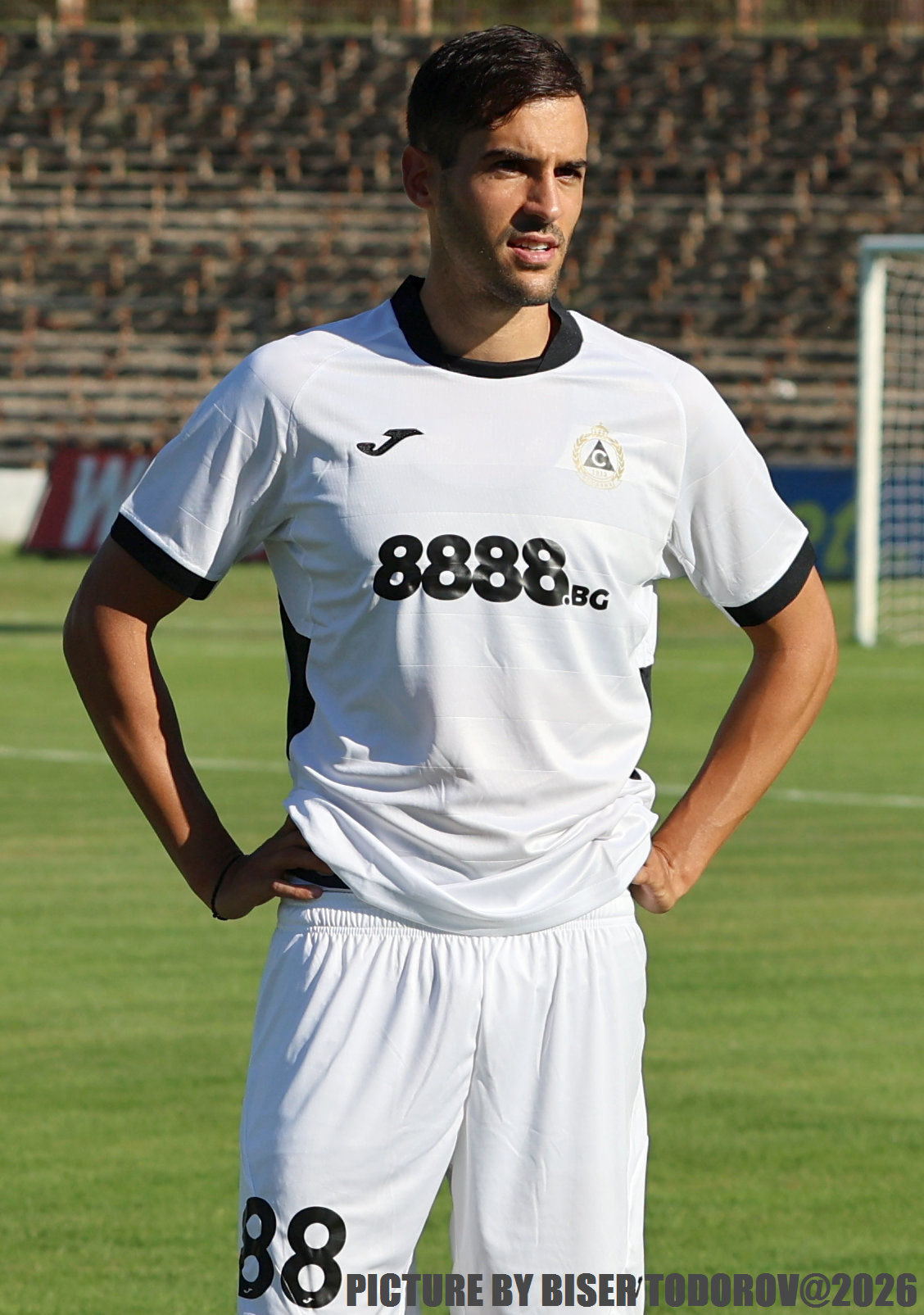

Personal information
- Full name: Vladimir Nikolaev Nikolov
- Date of birth: 7 February 2001 (age 25)
- Place of birth: Sofia, Bulgaria
- Height: 1.92 m (6 ft 4 in)
- Positions: Second striker; forward

Team information
- Current team: Slavia Sofia
- Number: 10

Youth career
- 2008–2011: Slavia Sofia
- 2011–2015: Dit Sofia
- 2015–2019: Septemvri Sofia

Senior career*
Years	Team	Apps	(Gls)
2018–2020	Septemvri Sofia	35	(6)
2020–2022	Würzburger Kickers	18	(0)
2022	Admira Wacker II	2	(3)
2022	Admira Wacker	11	(0)
2023–2025	Slavia Sofia	79	(16)
2025–2026	Korona Kielce	25	(0)
2026–	Slavia Sofia	0	(0)

International career^{‡}
2016–2017	Bulgaria U17	4	(1)
2019	Bulgaria U19	3	(2)
2020–2022	Bulgaria U21	14	(7)
2025–	Bulgaria	15	(3)
- * Club domestic league appearances and goals as of 21:09, 29 May 2026 (UTC) ‡ National team caps and goals as of 23:02, 6 October 2026 (UTC)

Vladimir Nikolaev Nikolov (Bulgarian: Владимир Николов; born 7 February 2001) is a Bulgarian professional footballer who plays as a forward for First League club Slavia Sofia and the Bulgaria national team.

== Club career ==
Nikolov began his career with Slavia Sofia where he spent three years. He then joined Dit Sofia at the age of 10.

=== Septemvri Sofia ===
On 19 April 2018, Nikolov made his first-team debut in the league match against Etar Veliko Tarnovo. He came off the bench in the 85th minute, replacing Georgi Stoichkov in a 4–2 away loss.

=== Würzburger Kickers ===
On 10 September 2020 Nikolov moved to Germany to join the 2. Bundesliga team Würzburger Kickers.

=== Admira Wacker ===
On 4 January 2022, Nikolov joined Admira Wacker in Austria from Würzburger Kickers, in exchange for Marco Hausjell moving in the opposite direction.

== Career statistics ==
=== Club ===
As of match played 23 May 2026

Appearances and goals by club, season and competition
Club	Season	League			National cup (Note: Includes Bulgarian Cup, Austrian Cup, Polish Cup)		Europe		Other		Total	
Club	Season	Division	Apps	Goals	Apps	Goals	Apps	Goals	Apps	Goals	Apps	Goals
Septemvri Sofia	2017–18	First League	1	0	0	0	—		—		1	0
Septemvri Sofia	2018–19	First League	13	0	4	0	—		0	0	17	0
Septemvri Sofia	2019–20	Second League	17	3	2	1	—		1 (Note: Appearances in promotion play-offs)	0	20	4
Septemvri Sofia	2020–21	Second League	4	3	0	0	—		—		4	3
Septemvri Sofia	Total		35	6	6	1	0	0	1	0	42	7
Würzburger Kickers	2020–21	2. Bundesliga	10	0	0	0	—		—		10	0
Würzburger Kickers	2021–22	3. Liga	8	0	0	0	—		—		8	0
Würzburger Kickers	Total		18	0	1	0	0	0	0	0	19	0
Admira Wacker II	2021–22	Austrian Regionalliga East	2	3	—		—		—		2	3
Admira Wacker	2021–22	Austrian Bundesliga	5	0	0	0	—		—		5	0
Admira Wacker	2022–23	2. Liga	6	0	1	0	—		—		7	0
Admira Wacker	Total		11	0	1	0	0	0	0	0	12	0
Slavia Sofia	2022–23	First League	16	2	1	0	—		—		17	2
Slavia Sofia	2023–24	First League	33	4	1	1	—		—		34	5
Slavia Sofia	2024–25	First League	30	10	2	0	—		—		32	10
Slavia Sofia	Total		79	16	4	1	0	0	0	0	83	17
Korona Kielce	2025–26	Ekstraklasa	25	0	3	1	—		—		28	1
Career total			170	25	15	3	0	0	1	0	186	28

=== International ===
As of match played 6 October 2026

Appearances and goals by national team and year
National team	Year	Apps	Goals
Bulgaria	2025	9	0
Bulgaria	2026	6	3
Total		15	3

Scores and results list Bulgaria's goal tally first, score column indicates score after each Nikolov goal.

List of international goals scored by Vladimir Nikolov
No.	Date	Venue	Cap	Opponent	Score	Result	Competition
1	27 March 2026	Gelora Bung Karno Stadium, Jakarta, Indonesia	10	Solomon Islands	6–1	10–2	2026 FIFA Series
2	27 March 2026	Gelora Bung Karno Stadium, Jakarta, Indonesia	10	Solomon Islands	9–2	10–2	2026 FIFA Series
3	27 March 2026	Gelora Bung Karno Stadium, Jakarta, Indonesia	10	Solomon Islands	10–2	10–2	2026 FIFA Series
