= Sámuel Major =

Hungarian footballer (born 2002)

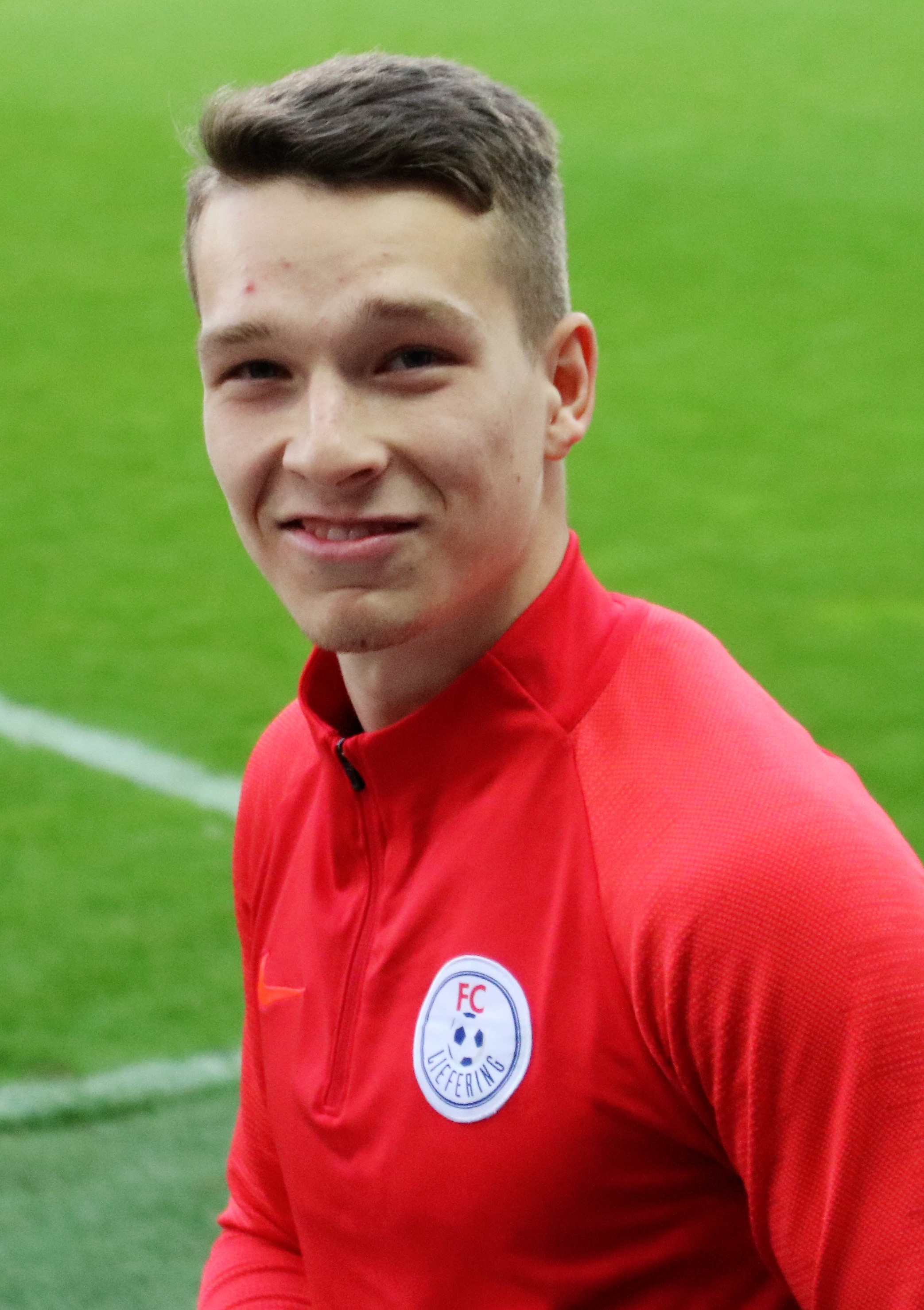

Personal information
- Full name: Sámuel Major
- Date of birth: 9 January 2002 (age 24)
- Place of birth: Debrecen, Hungary
- Height: 1.74 m (5 ft 9 in)
- Positions: Midfielder; right-back

Team information
- Current team: Spartak Varna (on loan from MTK)
- Number: 19

Youth career
- 2007–2017: Debrecen
- 2017–2020: Red Bull Salzburg

Senior career*
Years	Team	Apps	(Gls)
2020–2022	Liefering	35	(2)
2022	Admira Wacker	7	(0)
2022–2023	Debrecen	2	(0)
2023	→ Pécs (loan)	10	(0)
2023–2025	Kozármisleny	59	(3)
2025–2026	ASA Târgu Mureș	17	(0)
2026–	MTK	0	(0)
2026–	→ Spartak Varna (loan)	0	(0)

International career
2018	Hungary U16	10	(2)
2018–2019	Hungary U17	10	(2)
2018–2019	Hungary U18	2	(1)
2019	Hungary U19	2	(1)
2021–2022	Hungary U21	3	(1)
- * Club domestic league appearances and goals as of 25 April 2026

Sámuel Major (born 9 January 2002) is a Hungarian professional footballer who plays as a midfielder or right-back for Bulgarian First League club Spartak Varna on loan from MTK Budapest.

== Club career ==
Major began his career in his hometown with Debrecen, joining the club's youth academy in 2007. After a decade, he moved to Austria to join Red Bull Salzburg, initially playing for the club's youth teams.

He made his debut for Salzburg's affiliate club, Liefering, in the Austrian second tier in June 2020 while also competing in the UEFA Youth League, where he helped his team reach the semi-finals. The following month, he scored his first goal in the second division against Vorwärts Steyr on the final matchday of the 2019–20 season. He became a regular at Liefering the next season, scoring in the opening match against Austria Wien II.

On 5 January 2022, Major signed a two-and-a-half-year contract with Admira Wacker.

On 8 July 2022, Major returned to Debrecen on a one-year deal with an option for an additional year.

On 14 February 2023, Major joined Pécs on loan.

== International career ==
He was part of the Hungarian U-17 team at the 2019 UEFA European Under-17 Championship and 2019 FIFA U-17 World Cup,
