= Luan (footballer, born 1996) =

Brazilian footballer

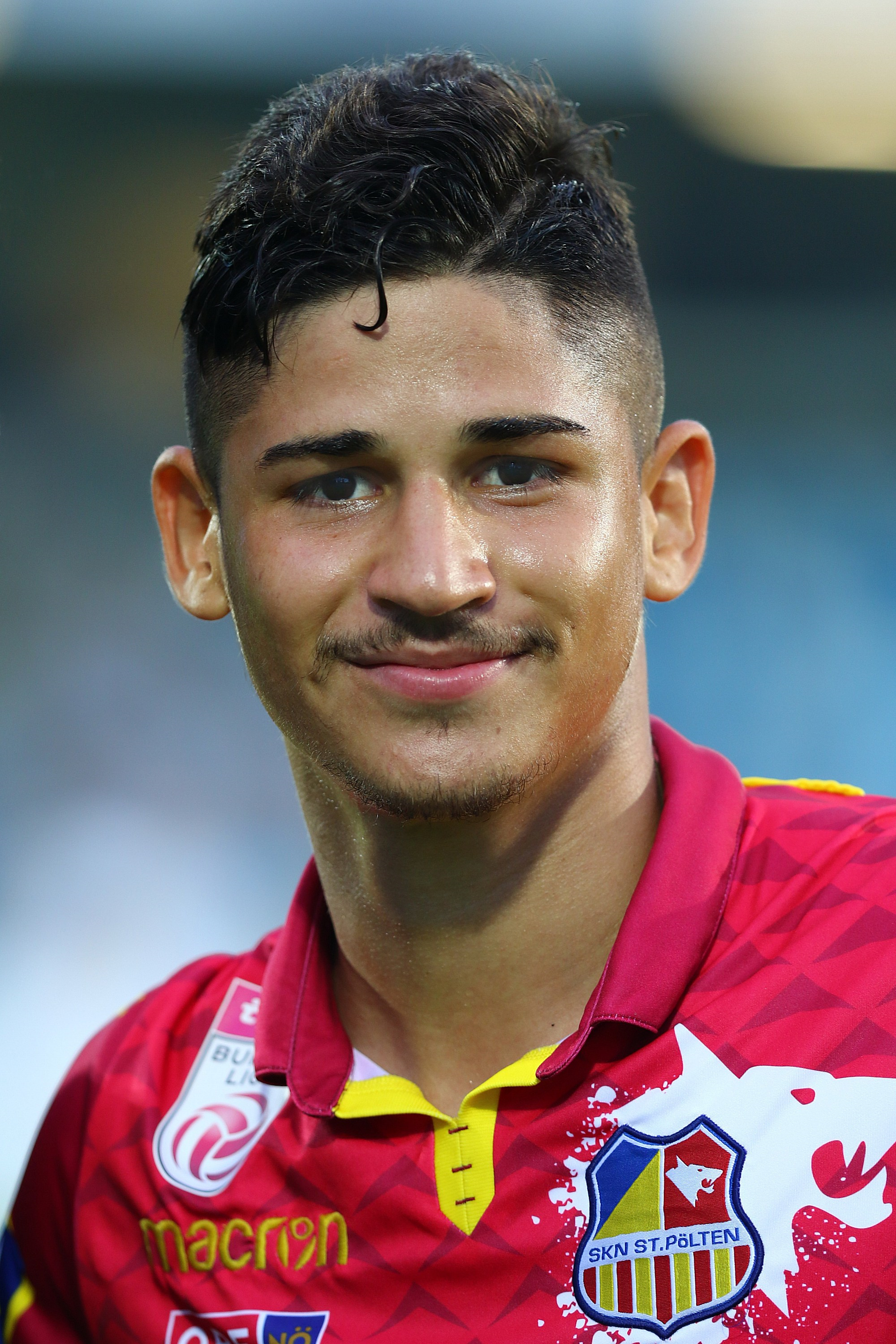

Personal information
- Full name: Luan Leite da Silva
- Date of birth: 31 May 1996 (age 30)
- Place of birth: Campo Grande, Brazil
- Height: 1.86 m (6 ft 1 in)
- Position: Centre-back

Team information
- Current team: Hertha Wels
- Number: 3

Youth career
- Red Bull Brasil

Senior career*
Years	Team	Apps	(Gls)
2015–2017	Liefering	60	(3)
2016–2017	Red Bull Salzburg	0	(0)
2017–2018	Sturm Graz	0	(0)
2018	→ St. Pölten (loan)	16	(0)
2018–2021	St. Pölten	65	(5)
2021–2022	Ionikos	1	(0)
2022	Admira Wacker	6	(1)
2022–2023	Lokomotiv Plovdiv	8	(0)
2023	→ Spartak Varna (loan)	8	(3)
2024	Democrata	2	(0)
2024	Pinzgau Saalfelden	16	(2)
2025–	Hertha Wels	26	(0)
- * Club domestic league appearances and goals as of 17 May 2026

Luan Leite da Silva (born 31 May 1996) is a Brazilian professional footballer who plays as a centre-back for Austrian Regionalliga club Hertha Wels.

== Career ==
On 10 July 2021, Luan joined Super League Greece side Ionikos on a free transfer.

On 5 July 2022 he signed a contract with the Bulgarian First League team Lokomotiv Plovdiv. On 7 February 2023 Luan was sent on loan to Spartak Varna until end of season. He completed his debut on 11 February, scoring a goal against Ludogorets Razgrad in a league match lost by Spartak by 1:2.

In February 2024, Luan returned to Brazil, signing with Democrata to compete in Série D. In July 2024, he moved back to Austria, Austrian Regionalliga West club Pinzgau Saalfelden.

== Career statistics ==
As of 28 July 2021

Club	Season	League			Cup		Continental		Other		Total	
Club	Season	Division	Apps	Goals	Apps	Goals	Apps	Goals	Apps	Goals	Apps	Goals
Liefering	2014–15	2. Liga	10	0	—		—		—		10	0
Liefering	2015–16	2. Liga	28	1	0	0	—		—		28	1
Liefering	2016–17	2. Liga	22	2	0	0	—		—		22	2
Liefering	Total		60	3	0	0	—		—		60	3
Red Bull Salzburg	2016–17	Austrian Bundesliga	0	0	1	0	—		—		1	0
Sturm Graz	2017–18	Austrian Bundesliga	0	0	0	0	—		—		0	0
St. Pölten (loan)	2017–18	Austrian Bundesliga	18	0	—		—		—		18	0
St. Pölten	2018–19	Austrian Bundesliga	30	2	2	0	—		—		32	2
St. Pölten	2019–20	Austrian Bundesliga	24	1	2	0	—		—		26	1
St. Pölten	2020–21	Austrian Bundesliga	11	2	1	0	—		—		12	2
St. Pölten	Total		65	5	5	0	—		—		70	5
Ionikos	2021–22	Super League Greece	0	0	0	0	—		—		0	0
Career total			143	8	6	0	0	0	0	0	149	8
