= Kapfenberger SV =

Association football club in Austria

- Full name: Kapfenberger Sportvereinigung 1919
- Nickname: Falken (The Falcons)
- Short name: KSV
- Founded: 14 September 1919; 107 years ago (as Kapfenberger SC)
- Ground: Franz Fekete Stadium
- Capacity: 9,640
- Chairman: Erwin Fuchs
- Manager: Vladimir Petrović
- League: 2. Liga
- 2025–26: 2. Liga, 13th of 16
- Website: http://www.ksv1919.at/
Home colours	Away colours

Kapfenberger SV is an Austrian association football club from Kapfenberg, Styria. They won the 2007–08 Austrian Football First League and were promoted to the Austrian Bundesliga. The club was founded in 1919 as Kapfenberger SC. The name of the team is often abbreviated to Kapfenberg. The club was renamed Kapfenberger SV in 1947 and currently play in the Austrian Second League, the second level of Austrian football.

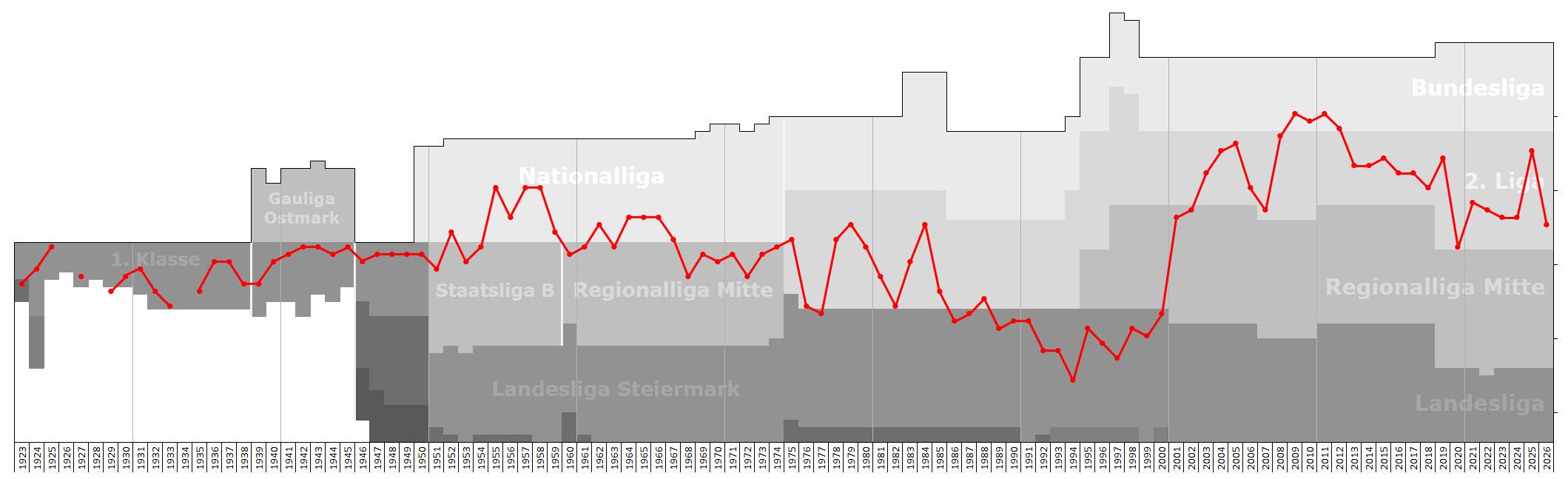
Historical chart of Kapfenberger SV league performance

== Players ==
=== Current squad ===
As of 6 February 2026

Note: Flags indicate national team as defined under FIFA eligibility rules; some limited exceptions apply. Players may hold more than one non-FIFA nationality.

No.	Pos.	Nation	Player
1	GK	AUT	Richard Strebinger
2	DF	GER	Enrique Pereira da Silva
3	FW	AUT	Lorenzo Coco
5	MF	SRB	Meletios Mišković (captain)
6	DF	AUT	Antonio Popić
7	MF	AUT	Marc Helleparth
8	MF	GER	Moritz Berg
9	MF	AUT	Marco Kadlec
10	MF	KOS	Bleron Krasniqi
11	FW	SEN	Lamine Touré (on loan from Bourges)
12	GK	AUT	Vinko Čolić
14	DF	AUT	Marco Pranjković
15	DF	BIH	Denis Kovačević
16	MF	AUT	Adrian Marinović
17	DF	GER	Robin Littig
18	FW	ROU	Andrei Rostaș
19	DF	AUT	Julian Turi

No.	Pos.	Nation	Player
22	FW	TUR	Yalın Dilek (on loan from Galatasaray)
23	MF	AUT	Luca Hassler
24	FW	ROU	Nicolas Pribag
27	DF	CRO	Noel Žiković
28	DF	AUT	Nico Mikulić
29	FW	KOS	Albin Berisha
30	FW	SUI	Ben Heuser
32	MF	AUT	Jakob Aigner
33	DF	CIV	Olivier N'Zi
35	MF	AUT	Felix Stauder
36	GK	AUT	David Puntigam
37	DF	AUT	Maximilian Hofer
38	DF	AUT	Philipp Breit
40	FW	AUT	Noah Knabl
41	GK	AUT	Irman Delić
71	MF	AUT	Thomas Maier
—	GK	AUT	Mario Zocher

== Coaching staff ==
- Vladimir Petrović – head coach
- Mario Grgić – assistant coach
- Matthias Götzinger – goalkeeper coach

=== Historical list of coaches ===
- Unknown (1919–1946)
- (Austria) Josef Blum (1946–1947)
- Unknown (1947–1951)
- (Austria) Hans Walch (1951–1952)
- (Austria) Josef Blum (1952–1953)
- (Austria) Adolf Preiner (1953–1956)
- Unknown (1956–1961)
- (Austria) Siegfried Joksch (1961–1964)
- (Czech Republic) Alfred Sezemsky (1964–1967)
- Unknown (1967–1973)
- (Austria) Hermann Stessl (1973–1975)
- (Austria) Wilhelm Huberts (1975–1976)
- (Austria) Friedrich Jalitsch (1976–1979)
- (Austria) Walter Peintinger (1980–1981)
- (Austria) Helmut Menzl (1982)
- (Austria) Karl Hofmeister (1982–84)
- (Socialist Federal Republic of Yugoslavia) Tomislav Knez (1984–85)
- Unknown (1985–1986)
- (Austria) Johann Windisch (1986–87)
- (Austria) Robert Pflug (1987)
- (Austria) Ewald Ratschnig (1987–88)
- Unknown (1988–1990)
- (Germany) Gerd Struppert (1990–91)
- Unknown (1991–1994)
- (Slovakia) Ladislav Jurkemik (1994–96)
- Unknown (1996–1998)
- (Serbia) Dejan Stanković (1998–99)
- Unknown (1999–00)
- (Austria) Hans-Peter Schaller (2000–06)
- (Austria) Drazen Svalina (2006)
- (Serbia) Ljubiša Sušić (2006)
- (Austria) Werner Gregoritsch (2006–11)
- (Austria) Manfred Unger (2011)
- (Germany) Thomas von Heesen (2011–12)
- (Austria) Klaus Schmidt (2012–13)
- (Austria) Kurt Russ (2013–16)
- (Bosnia and Herzegovina) Abdulah Ibraković (2016–17)
- (Austria) Robert Pflug (2017)
- (Austria) Stefan Rapp (2017–18)
- (Austria) Kurt Russ (2018–20)
- (Bosnia and Herzegovina) Abdulah Ibraković (2020–21)
- (Croatia) Vladimir Petrović (2021–22)
- (Bosnia and Herzegovina) Abdulah Ibraković (2022–24)
- (Germany) Ismail Atalan (2024–25)
- (Croatia) Vladimir Petrović (2025–)
