= René Hellermann =

Austrian footballer (born 2000)

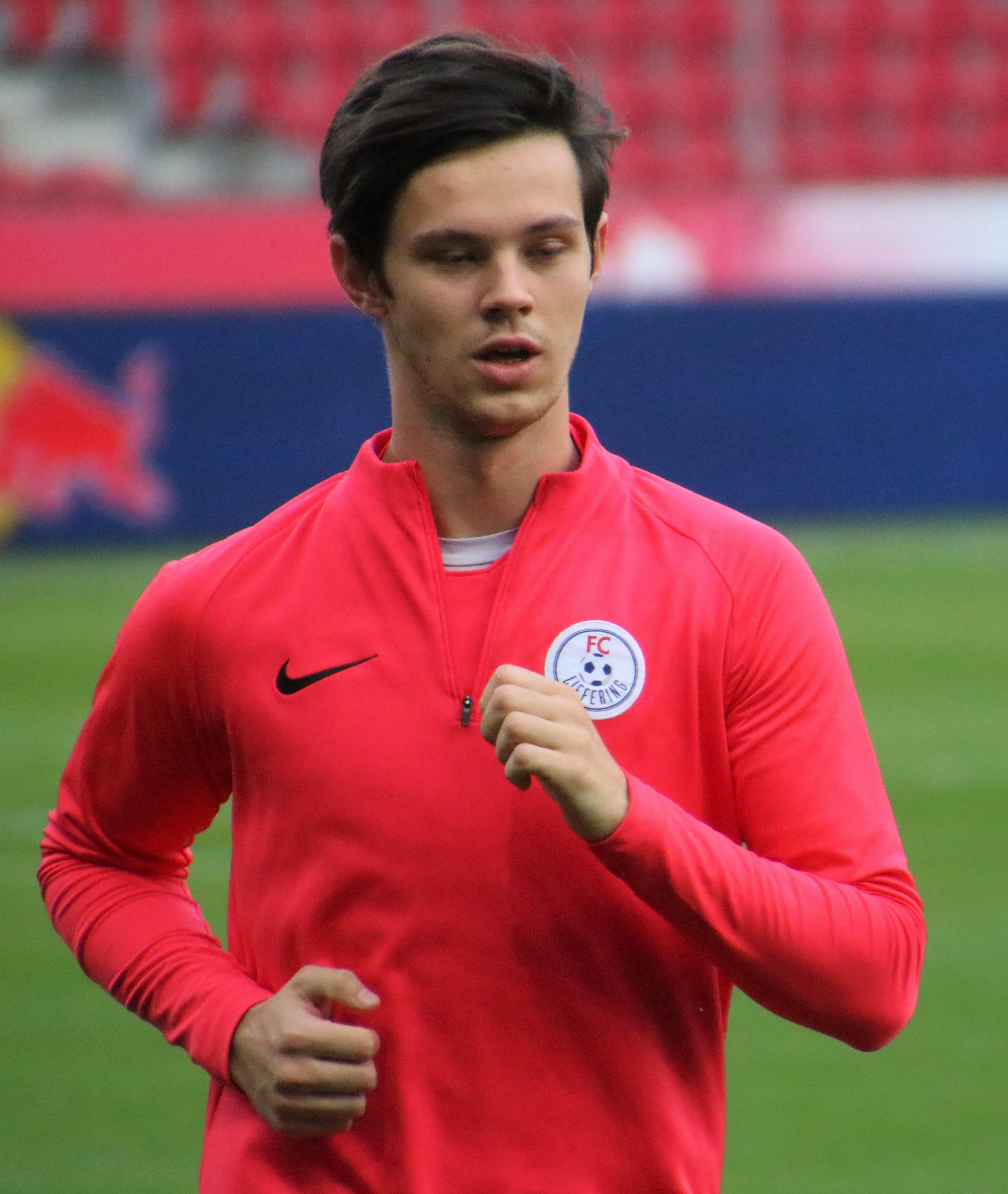

Personal information
- Date of birth: 7 June 2000 (age 26)
- Place of birth: Innsbruck, Austria
- Height: 1.84 m (6 ft 1/2 in)
- Position: Forward

Team information
- Current team: SPG Silz/Mötz
- Number: 22

Youth career
- 2006–2014: Innsbrucker AC
- 2014–2018: AKA Tirol

Senior career*
Years	Team	Apps	(Gls)
2018–2020	FC Liefering	8	(0)
2020–2022	Admira Wacker II	14	(1)
2022–2024	SC Imst	24	(7)
2024–	SPG Silz/Mötz	3	(0)

International career
2017	Austria U18	6	(1)
- * Club domestic league appearances and goals as of 19:24, 1 October 2024 (UTC)

René Hellermann (born 7 June 2000) is an Austrian footballer who plays as a forward for Regionalliga Tirol club SPG Silz/Mötz.

== Career ==
Hellermann started his career with the youth team of Innsbrucker AC. In 2006 he came to the Tyrol football academy where he played for all teams (U15, U16, U18).

In 2018, he signed with FC Liefering. He was also a member of the FC Red Bull Salzburg U19 team during the 2017–18 UEFA Youth League.

He made his professional debut playing for Red Bull Salzburg's feeder team, FC Liefering, against Floridsdorfer AC on 16 March 2018.

On 7 January 2020, Hellermann moved to FC Admira Wacker Mödling, where he was registered for the clubs reserve team in the Austrian Regionalliga.

Hellermann signed with Regionalliga Tirol club SC Imst in January 2022. In the summer of 2024, he moved to division rivals SPG Silz/Mötz.
