= Marco Kadlec =

Austrian footballer

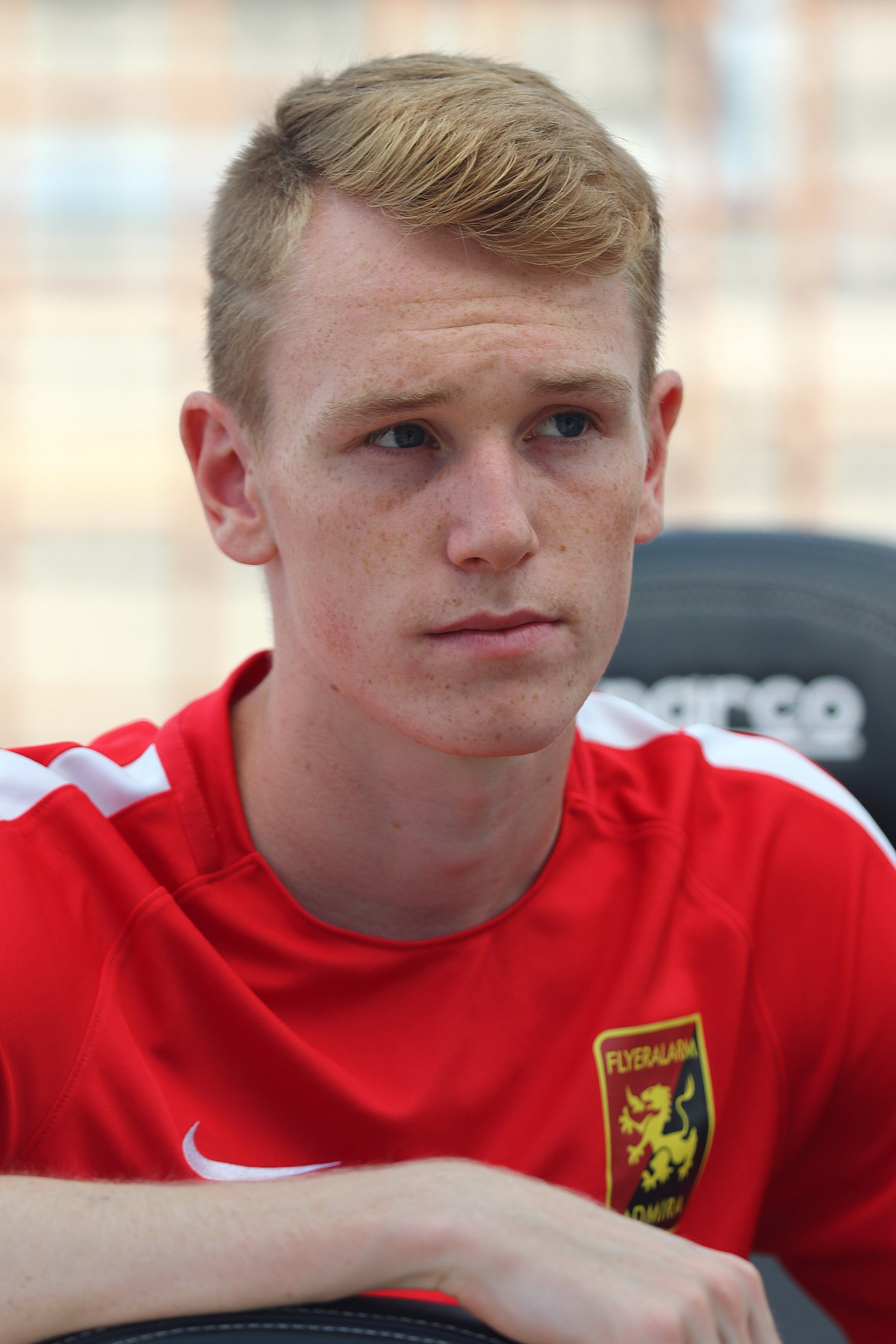

Personal information
- Date of birth: 28 February 2000 (age 26)
- Place of birth: Austria
- Height: 1.83 m (6 ft 0 in)
- Position: Midfielder

Team information
- Current team: Kapfenberger SV
- Number: 9

Senior career*
Years	Team	Apps	(Gls)
2017–2021	Admira Wacker II	61	(9)
2018–2022	Admira Wacker	33	(1)
2022–2023	Juniors OÖ	34	(12)
2023–2025	SKU Amstetten	14	(1)
2024	→ SPG Hogo Wels (loan)	12	(2)
2025–	Kapfenberger SV	21	(1)

International career^{‡}
2015–2016	Austria U16	5	(0)
2017	Austria U17	2	(0)
2017–2018	Austria U18	10	(0)
2018	Austria U19	4	(0)
- * Club domestic league appearances and goals as of 17 May 2026 ‡ National team caps and goals as of 10 October 2018

Marco Kadlec (born 28 February 2000) is an Austrian footballer who plays for Kapfenberger SV.

== Club career ==
On 2 February 2022, Kadlec signed with Juniors OÖ.
