= Marco Hausjell =

Austrian footballer (born 1999)

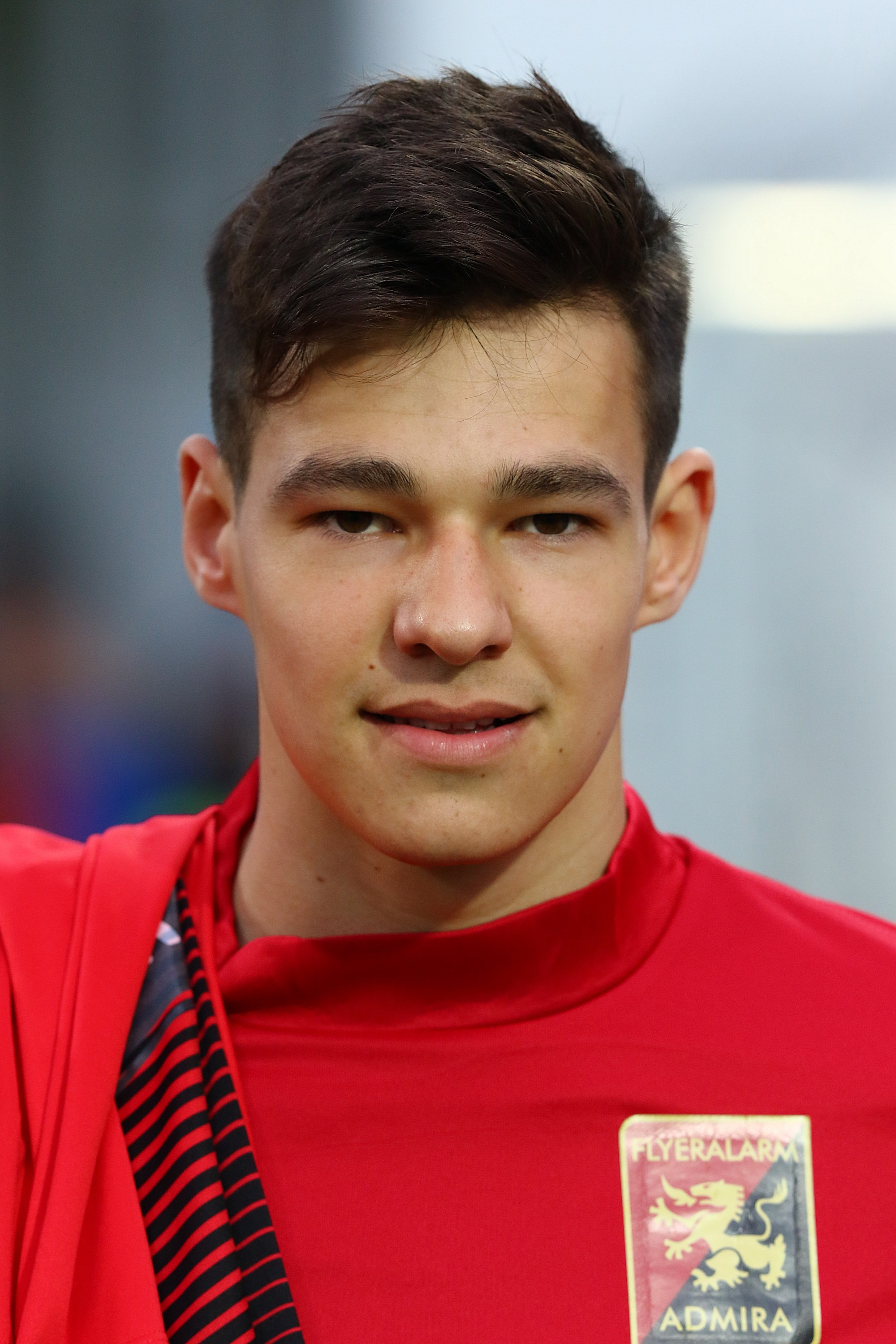
- Hausjell with Admira Wacker in 2018

Personal information
- Date of birth: 6 June 1999 (age 27)
- Place of birth: Felixdorf, Austria
- Height: 1.76 m (5 ft 9 in)
- Position: Right winger

Team information
- Current team: Young Violets
- Number: 7

Youth career
- 2004–2009: 1. SC Felixdorf
- 2009–2016: Admira Wacker

Senior career*
Years	Team	Apps	(Gls)
2016–2019	Admira Wacker II	47	(15)
2018–2022	Admira Wacker	41	(4)
2019–2020	→ SV Horn (loan)	27	(11)
2022	Würzburger Kickers	8	(0)
2022–2024	SV Horn	53	(11)
2024–2025	SV Stripfing	23	(2)
2025–2026	SKN St. Pölten	28	(11)
2026–	Young Violets	11	(6)

International career
2016–2017	Austria U18	3	(0)
2017	Austria U19	1	(0)
- * Club domestic league appearances and goals as of 11:02, 5 November 2026 (UTC)

Marco Hausjell (born 6 June 1999) is an Austrian professional footballer who plays as a right winger for 2. Liga club Young Violets.

== Club career ==
=== Admira Wacker ===
Hausjell started his football career with 1. SC Felixdorf. In 2009, he joined the youth teams of Admira Wacker, where he later also played in the academy.

He made his debut for the Admira reserves on 27 September 2016, when he was in the starting eleven against the SKN St. Pölten reserves, before being replaced by Florian Fischerauer in the 75th minute.

After more than 15 games for the reserves, Hausjell made his first-team debut in the Austrian Bundesliga, starting in a 2–1 home victory against Rapid Wien on 11 February 2018, and scoring his first professional goal in the 69th minute of the game.

For the 2019–20 season, he moved on loan to 2. Liga club SV Horn. After the 2019–20 season, he initially did not return to Admira, as his contract had not been renewed. After Admira appointed a new sporting director in Franz Wohlfahrt, Hausjell's contract was extended in August 2020 and he signed a two-year contract. After his return, he made 20 Bundesliga appearances in the 2020–21 season, scoring once. In the 2021–22 season, he played eight times in the league before the winter break.

=== Würzburger Kickers ===
On 4 January 2022, Hausjell joined 3. Liga German club Würzburger Kickers. He made his debut for the club on 16 January, replacing Moritz Heinrich in the 89th minute of a 2–0 away loss to SC Verl. His first start for Würzburg came on 5 March 2022, playing 65 minutes before being substituted for Saliou Sané in a late 1–0 away win over Wehen Wiesbaden.

Hausjell made eight appearances for the club, as they suffered relegation to the Regionalliga Bayern at the end of the 2021–22 season.

=== Return to SV Horn ===
After six months, he returned to Austria where he signed for SV Horn on a two-year contract. He made his first appearance upon returning to the club on 15 July 2022, playing the first half of a 3–0 away win in the Austrian Cup over ASV Draßburg. Hausjell also appeared during the first match of Horn's 2022–23 2. Liga season, replacing Marcel Schelle at halftime in a 2–1 victory against Sturm Graz II.

=== SV Stripfing ===
On 1 June 2024, Hausjell joined newly promoted Austrian 2. Liga club SV Stripfing on a one-year contract.
