= Joseph Ganda (footballer) =

Israeli footballer

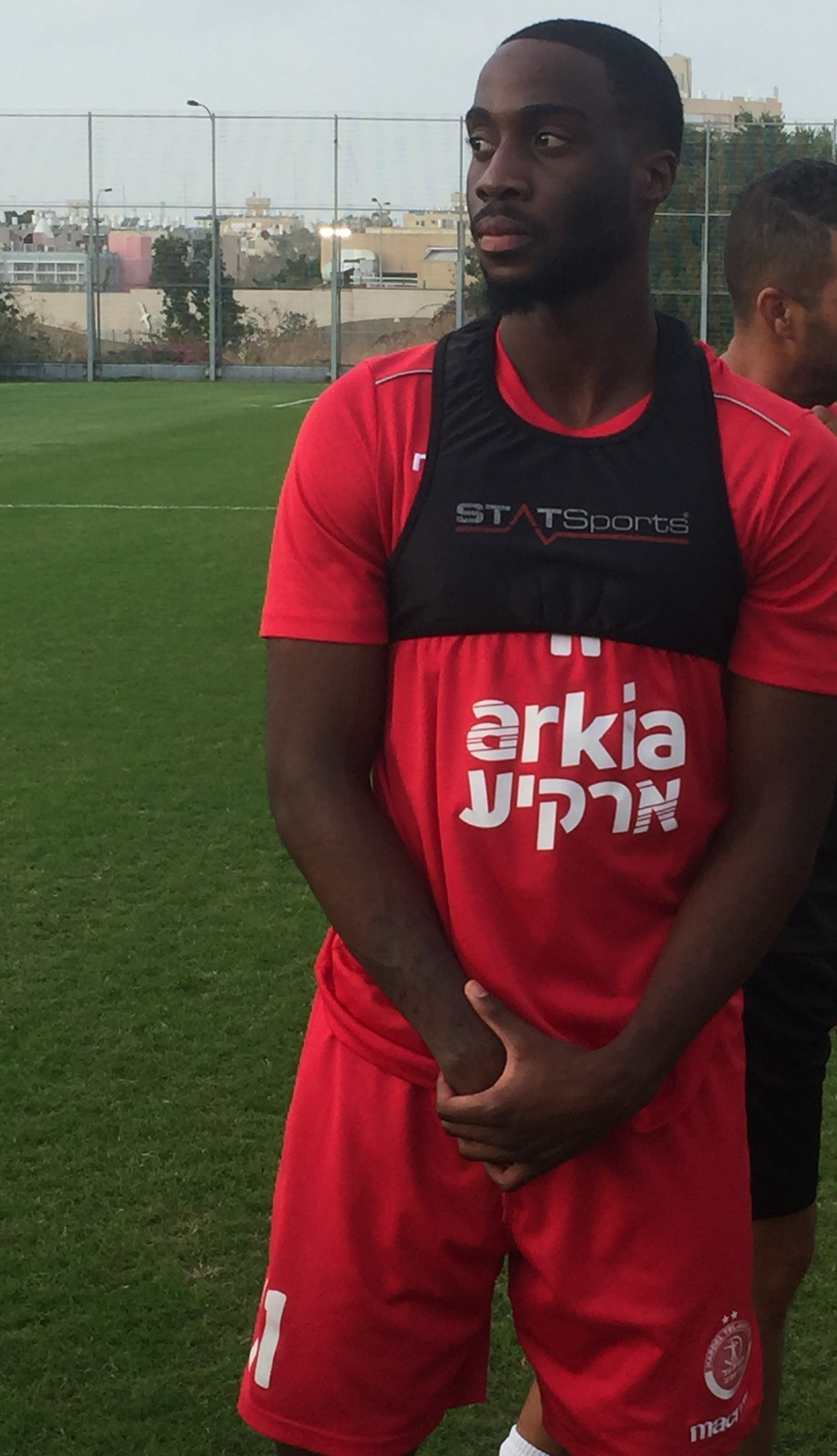

Personal information
- Date of birth: 10 March 1997 (age 29)
- Place of birth: Tel Aviv, Israel
- Height: 1.86 m (6 ft 1 in)
- Position: Forward

Team information
- Current team: FC Ingolstadt
- Number: 16

Youth career
- –2015: Maccabi Netanya

Senior career*
Years	Team	Apps	(Gls)
2015	Maccabi Netanya	1	(0)
2015–2017	Kiryat Shmona	3	(0)
2017–2019	Hapoel Tel Aviv	42	(8)
2019–2020	Augsburg II	12	(3)
2020–2022	Admira Wacker	32	(2)
2022–2023	SV Sandhausen	10	(0)
2023–2024	F.C. Ashdod	8	(0)
2024	Bnei Sakhnin	8	(0)
2024–2025	Phönix Lübeck	11	(2)
2025	Teutonia Ottensen	13	(5)
2025–2026	Hannover 96 II	16	(3)
2026–	FC Ingolstadt	0	(0)

International career
2015	Israel U19	2	(0)
- * Club domestic league appearances and goals as of 16 May 2026

Joseph Ganda (Hebrew: ג'וזף גנדה; born 10 March 1997) is an Israeli professional footballer who plays as a forward for German 3. Liga club FC Ingolstadt.

== Early life ==
Ganda was born in Israel to parents from Congo. He grew up in south Tel Aviv with his mother after Ganda's parents got divorced and his father left Israel. He quickly took a liking to football and joined Maccabi Tel Aviv at the age of seven.

== Career ==
Ganda joined German club Phönix Lübeck, playing in the Regionalliga Nord, in September 2024.

== Career statistics ==
=== Club ===
As of 1 April 2021

Appearances and goals by club, season and competition
Club	Season	League			National cup		League cup		Continental		Other		Total	
Club	Season	Division	Apps	Goals	Apps	Goals	Apps	Goals	Apps	Goals	Apps	Goals	Apps	Goals
Maccabi Netanya	2014–15	Israeli Premier League	1	0	0	0	0	0	–		0	0	1	0
Kiryat Shmona	2015–16	Israeli Premier League	0	0	0	0	1 (Note: Appearances in the Toto Cup)	0	–		0	0	1	0
Kiryat Shmona	2016–17	Israeli Premier League	3	0	1 (Note: Appearances in the Israel State Cup)	0	5	0	–		0	0	9	0
Kiryat Shmona	Total		3	0	1	0	6	0	0	0	0	0	10	0
Hapoel Tel Aviv	2016–17	Israeli Premier League	8	1	0	0	0	0	–		0	0	8	1
Hapoel Tel Aviv	2017–18	Israeli Premier League	11	4	0	0	0	0	–		0	0	11	4
Hapoel Tel Aviv	2018–19	Israeli Premier League	23	3	2	0	0	0	–		0	0	25	3
Hapoel Tel Aviv	Total		42	8	2	0	0	0	0	0	0	0	44	8
FC Augsburg II	2019–20	Regionalliga Bayern	12	3	–		–		–		0	0	12	3
Admira Wacker	2020–21	Bundesliga	8	0	1 (Note: Appearances in the Austrian Cup)	0	–		–		0	0	9	0
Career total			2	2	1	0	0	0	0	0	0	0	3	2
