= 2025–26 LASK season =

Austrian football club season

LASK
2025–26 season
- Owner: LASK GmbH
- President: Siegmund Gruber
- Manager: João Sacramento (until 23 September 2025); Maximilian Ritscher (interim); Dietmar Kühbauer (from 9 October 2025)
- Stadium: Raiffeisen Arena
- Bundesliga: 1st
- Austrian Cup: Winners
- Top goalscorer: League: Moses Usor (13); All: Moses Usor (15)
- Highest home attendance: 18,800
- Lowest home attendance: 9,013
- Average home league attendance: 13,433
- Biggest win: 5–1 v. Hartberg (A); 26 April 2026
- Biggest defeat: 1–5 v. Red Bull Salzburg (H); 22 February 2026
Home colours	Away colours	Third colours

The 2025–26 season was the 118th season in the history of Linzer Athletik-Sport-Klub and their ninth consecutive season in Austrian Bundesliga, the top tier of Austrian football. In addition to the domestic league, the club also participated in the Austrian Cup, beating SCR Altach in the final, winning their second ever cup title.

== Coaching staff ==
As of 17 May 2026

Position	Staff
Head coach	(Austria) Dietmar Kühbauer
Assistant coach	(Austria) Maximilian Ritscher (Austria) Manfred Nastl
Goalkeeper coach	(Austria) Philip Großalber
Athletic coach	(Germany) Leopold Angerer
Video analyst	(Slovenia) Mario Milanič

== Squad ==
Note: Flags indicate national team as defined under FIFA eligibility rules; some limited exceptions apply. Players may hold more than one non-FIFA nationality.

No.	Pos.	Nation	Player
1	GK	AUT	Lukas Jungwirth
2	DF	USA	George Bello
3	DF	NED	Xavier Mbuyamba
4	MF	MLI	Ismaila Coulibaly
5	MF	KOS	Art Smakaj
6	DF	SUR	Melayro Bogarde
7	FW	USA	Samuel Adeniran
8	FW	NGA	Moses Usor
9	MF	CZE	Kryštof Daněk (on loan from Sparta Prague)
10	FW	AUT	Saša Kalajdžić (on loan from Wolverhampton)
11	FW	AUT	Maximilian Entrup
13	MF	NGA	Adetunji Adeshina
15	MF	MLI	Mohamed Sanogo
16	DF	PAN	Andrés Andrade

No.	Pos.	Nation	Player
20	DF	DEN	Kasper Jørgensen
27	FW	AUT	Christoph Lang
29	MF	AUT	Florian Flecker
30	MF	AUT	Sascha Horvath (captain)
33	GK	AUT	Tobias Schützenauer
38	MF	AUT	Armin Haider
41	DF	NGA	Emmanuel Michael
43	DF	BRA	João Tornich (on loan from Portimonense)
44	MF	CRO	Lukas Kačavenda (on loan from Dinamo Zagreb)
48	DF	SEN	Modou Kéba Cissé
50	GK	AUT	Fabian Schillinger
52	DF	MLI	Cheikne Kébé
76	DF	MKD	Metodi Maksimov

== Competitions ==
=== Overall record ===
Competition	First match	Last match	Starting round	Final position	Record							
Competition	First match	Last match	Starting round	Final position	Pld	W	D	L	GF	GA	GD	Win %
Austrian Football Bundesliga	1 August 2025	17 May 2026	Matchday 1	Winners	32	17	7	8	56	42	+14	53.13
Austrian Cup	26 July 2025	1 May 2025	First round	Winners	6	6	0	0	17	5	+12	100.00
Total					38	23	7	8	73	47	+26	60.53

Last updated: 17 May 2026
Source: Soccerway

=== Austrian Football Bundesliga ===
==== Regular season ====
===== League table =====
Pos	Team	Pld	W	D	L	GF	GA	GD	Pts	Qualification
1	Sturm Graz	22	12	2	8	33	26	+7	38	Qualification for the Championship round
2	Red Bull Salzburg	22	10	7	5	42	26	+16	37	Qualification for the Championship round
3	LASK	22	11	4	7	32	30	+2	37	Qualification for the Championship round
4	Austria Wien	22	11	3	8	34	30	+4	36	Qualification for the Championship round
5	SK Rapid	22	9	6	7	26	25	+1	33	Qualification for the Championship round

Source: Austrian Football Bundesliga
Rules for classification: 1) Points; 2) Head-to-head record; 3) Goal difference; 4) Goals scored; 5) Matches won; 6) Away matches won; 7) Away goals scored.

===== Results summary =====
Overall								Home						Away					
Pld	W	D	L	GF	GA	GD	Pts	W	D	L	GF	GA	GD	W	D	L	GF	GA	GD
22	11	4	7	32	30	+2	37	7	1	3	18	15	+3	4	3	4	14	15	−1

Last updated: 8 March 2026.
Source: ADMIRAL Bundesliga

===== Results by round =====
Round	1	2	3	4	5	6	7	8	9	10	11	12	13	14	15	16	17	18	19	20	21	22
Ground	H	A	H	A	H	A	H	A	H	A	H	A	H	A	H	A	A	H	A	H	A	H
Result	L	L	W	L	L	L	W	L	D	W	W	W	W	W	W	D	W	W	D	L	D	W
Position	11	12	8	10	10	11	10	11	11	10	10	7	6	4	3	3	2	2	2	3	3	3
Points	0	0	3	3	3	3	6	6	7	10	13	16	19	22	25	26	29	32	33	33	34	37

Source: ADMIRAL Bundesliga
A = Away; H = Home; W = Win; D = Draw; L = Loss; P = Postponed

===== Matches =====
The regular season league fixtures were released on 27 June 2025.

Win Draw Loss Fixtures

1 August 2025 1	LASK	0–2	Sturm Graz	Linz
20:30 CEST		Report	Grgić 9'; Kiteishvili 12' (pen.)	Stadium: Raiffeisen Arena; Attendance: 12,668; Referee: Harald Lechner

10 August 2025 2	WSG Tirol	3–1	LASK	Innsbruck
17:00 CEST	Wels 13'; Müller 25' (pen.), 85'	Report	Bello 50'	Stadium: Tivoli Stadion Tirol; Attendance: 2,250; Referee: Jakob Semler

17 August 2025 3	LASK	2–1	Austria Wien	Linz
17:00 CEST	Adeniran 35'; Usor 69' (pen.)	Report	Cissé 6' (o.g.)	Stadium: Raiffeisen Arena; Attendance: 12,510; Referee: Alexander Harkam

23 August 2025 4	Red Bull Salzburg	3–0	LASK	Salzburg
17:00 CEST	Diabaté 24'; Ratkov 31'; Baidoo 82'	Report		Stadium: Red Bull Arena; Attendance: 11,583; Referee: Julian Weinberger

30 August 2025 5	LASK	1–3	SV Ried	Linz
17:00 CEST	Alemão 65'	Report	Grosse 39' (pen.), 41'; Kiedl 52'	Stadium: Raiffeisen Arena; Attendance: 13,297; Referee: Arnes Talic

13 September 2025 6	Rheindorf Altach	1–0	LASK	Altach
17:00 CEST	Diawara 31' (pen.)	Report		Stadium: Stadion Schnabelholz; Attendance: 4,657; Referee: Sebastian Gishamer

21 September 2025 7	LASK	2–0	Blau-Weiß Linz	Linz
14:30 CEST	Lang 86'; Daněk 90+4'	Report		Stadium: Raiffeisen Arena; Attendance: 18,134; Referee: Christian-Petru Ciochirca

27 September 2025 8	Wolfsberg	1–0	LASK	Wolfsberg
17:00 CEST	Renner 85'	Report		Stadium: Lavanttal-Arena; Attendance: 3,586; Referee: Markus Hameter

5 October 2025 9	LASK	3–3	Hartberg	Linz
14:30 CEST	Lang 90'; Jørgensen 90+2'; Andrade 90+5'	Report	Wilfinger 45+2'; Havel 64'; Hoffmann 71'	Stadium: Raiffeisen Arena; Attendance: 10,981; Referee: Harald Lechner

19 October 2025 10	Rapid Wien	0–2	LASK	Vienna
17:00 CEST		Report	Usor 12'; Adeniran 42'	Stadium: Allianz Stadion; Attendance: 23,337; Referee: Alexander Harkam

25 October 2025 11	LASK	1–0	Grazer AK	Linz
17:00 CEST	Horvath 71'	Report		Stadium: Raiffeisen Arena; Attendance: 10,781; Referee: Sebastian Gishamer

1 November 2025 12	Blau-Weiß Linz	0–1	LASK	Linz
17:00 CET		Report	Adeniran 54'	Stadium: Donauparkstadion; Attendance: 5,595; Referee: Isa Simsek

9 November 2025 13	LASK	1–0	Rheindorf Altach	Linz
14:30 CET	Yalcin 30' (o.g.)	Report		Stadium: Raiffeisen Arena; Attendance: 10,105; Referee: Alain Sadikovski

23 November 2025 14	Sturm Graz	1–3	LASK	Graz
14:30 CET	Kiteishvili 7'	Report	Jørgensen 25'; Usor 27'; Daněk 60'	Stadium: Liebenauer Stadium; Attendance: 15,476; Referee: Walter Altmann

30 November 2025 15	LASK	3–0	Rapid Wien	Linz
17:00 CET	Jørgensen 45+13'; Usor 55'; Lang 83'	Report		Stadium: Raiffeisen Arena; Attendance: 16,263; Referee: Arnes Talic

6 December 2025 16	Hartberg	2–2	LASK	Hartberg
17:00 CET	Kainz 6'; Havel 25'	Report	Jørgensen 32'; Usor 90+2'	Stadium: Stadion Hartberg; Attendance: 2,087; Referee: Isa Simsek

13 December 2025 17	Grazer AK	1–2	LASK	Graz
17:00 CET	Pines 18'	Report	Usor 4'; Adeniran 25'	Stadium: Liebenauer Stadium; Attendance: 7,071; Referee: Walter Altmann

7 February 2026 18	LASK	1–0	WSG Tirol	Linz
17:00 CET	Adeniran 17'	Report		Stadium: Raiffeisen Arena; Attendance: 9,013; Referee: Sebastian Gishamer

14 February 2026 19	SV Ried	1–1	LASK	Ried im Innkreis
17:00 CET	Van Wyk 35'	Report	Usor 90+13' (pen.)	Stadium: BWT X Upper Austrian Arena; Attendance: 7,058; Referee: Christian-Petru Ciochirca

22 February 2026 20	LASK	1–5	Red Bull Salzburg	Linz
17:00 CET	Kalajdžić 19'	Report	Alajbegović 6'; Konaté 10', 64'; Kitano 37'; Redzic 90+4'	Stadium: Raiffeisen Arena; Attendance: 13,669; Referee: Alexander Harkam

1 March 2026 21	Austria Wien	2–2	LASK	Vienna
17:00 CET	Dragović 47'; Eggestein 88' (pen.)	Report	Usor 24'; Lang 72'	Stadium: Franz Horr Stadium; Attendance: 14,165; Referee: Arnes Talic

8 March 2026 22	LASK	3–1	Wolfsberg	Linz
17:00 CET	Adeniran 36'; Jørgensen 69'; Entrup 90+3'	Report	Baumgartner 42'	Stadium: Raiffeisen Arena; Attendance: 10,717; Referee: Safak Barmaksiz

==== Championship round ====
As LASK finished on 37 points in the regular season, they started the championship round on 18 points.

===== League table =====
Pos	Team	Pld	W	D	L	GF	GA	GD	Pts	Qualification	LSK	STU	RBS	AWI	RWI	HAR
1	LASK (C)	32	17	7	8	56	42	+14	39	Qualification for the Champions League play-off round	—	1–1	2–1	4–1	3–1	0–0
2	Sturm Graz	32	16	8	8	51	35	+16	37	Qualification for the Champions League second qualifying round	1–1	—	1–1	1–1	2–0	0–0
3	Red Bull Salzburg	32	13	9	10	56	41	+15	29	Qualification for the Europa League third qualifying round (Note: The 2025–26 Austrian Cup winners (LASK) qualified for the Europa League third qualifying round. Since LASK finished as league champions, the Europa League berth went to the third place team.)	2–3	1–1	—	3–1	0–1	1–3
4	Austria Wien	32	14	5	13	45	50	−5	29	Qualification for the Conference League second qualifying round	0–3	2–5	1–3	—	1–1	1–0
5	SK Rapid (O)	32	12	8	12	36	41	−5	27	Qualification for the Conference League play-offs	4–2	0–2	1–0	0–2	—	0–2

Source: Austrian Football Bundesliga
Rules for classification: 1) Points; 2) Points with (possible) half points subtracted due to rounding; 3) Head-to-head points; 4) Head-to-head goal difference; 5) Head-to-head goals scored; 6) Goal difference; 7) Goals scored; 8) Matches won; 9) Away matches won; 10) Away goals scored.
(C) Champions; (O) Play-off winners

===== Results summary =====
Overall								Home						Away					
Pld	W	D	L	GF	GA	GD	Pts	W	D	L	GF	GA	GD	W	D	L	GF	GA	GD
10	6	3	1	24	12	+12	21	3	2	0	10	4	+6	3	1	1	14	8	+6

Last updated: 17 May 2026.
Source: ADMIRAL Bundesliga

===== Results by round =====
Round	23	24	25	26	27	28	29	30	31	32
Ground	H	A	H	A	H	A	A	H	H	A
Result	D	L	W	W	D	D	W	W	W	W
Position	2	5	4	2	2	3	1	1	1	1
Points	19	19	22	25	26	27	30	33	36	39

Source: ADMIRAL Bundesliga
A = Away; H = Home; W = Win; D = Draw; L = Loss; P = Postponed

===== Matches =====
The championship round league fixtures were released on 8 March 2026.

Win Draw Loss Fixtures

13 March 2026 23	LASK	0–0	Hartberg	Linz
19:30 CET		Report		Stadium: Raiffeisen Arena; Attendance: 9,544; Referee: Alain Sadikovski

22 March 2026 24	Rapid Wien	4–2	LASK	Vienna
17:00 CET	Schöller 3'; Bolla 33', 65' (pen.); Seidl 85'	Report	Adeniran 1'; Usor 79'	Stadium: Allianz Stadion; Attendance: 13,591; Referee: Arnes Talic

5 April 2026 25	LASK	4–1	Austria Wien	Linz
14:30 CEST	Cissé 4'; Jørgensen 12'; Usor 13'; Kalajdžić 32'	Report	Lee Tae-seok 16'	Stadium: Raiffeisen Arena; Attendance: 12,849; Referee: Jakob Semler

10 April 2026 26	Red Bull Salzburg	2–3	LASK	Salzburg
19:30 CEST	Konaté 28'; Kjærgaard 90+1'	Report	Cissé 8'; Kalajdžić 62'; Mbuyamba 90+5'	Stadium: Red Bull Arena; Attendance: 10,445; Referee: Christian-Petru Ciochirca

19 April 2026 27	LASK	1–1	Sturm Graz	Linz
17:00 CEST	Kalajdžić 68'	Report	Kiteishvili 10' (pen.)	Stadium: Raiffeisen Arena; Attendance: 18,800; Referee: Walter Altmann

22 April 2026 28	Sturm Graz	1–1	LASK	Graz
20:30 CEST	Kiteishvili 78' (pen.)	Report	Usor 52'	Stadium: Liebenauer Stadium; Attendance: 15,588; Referee: Arnes Talic

26 April 2026 29	Hartberg	1–5	LASK	Hartberg
14:30 CEST	Havel 48'	Report	Mbuyamba 5'; Kalajdžić 30', 90+5'; Usor 46'; Lang 90+2'	Stadium: Stadion Hartberg; Attendance: 3,138; Referee: Markus Hameter

4 May 2026 30	LASK	3–1	Rapid Wien	Linz
20:30 CEST	Horvath 52'; Adeniran 63' (pen.); Usor 75'	Report	Antiste 12'	Stadium: Raiffeisen Arena; Attendance: 16,289; Referee: Alexander Harkam

10 May 2026 31	LASK	2–1	Red Bull Salzburg	Linz
17:00 CEST	Adeniran 33'; Jørgensen 37'	Report	Konaté 87'	Stadium: Raiffeisen Arena; Attendance: 18,800; Referee: Markus Hameter

17 May 2026 32	Austria Wien	0–3	LASK	Vienna
14:30 CEST		Report	Mbuyamba 38'; Adeniran 49' (pen.); Bogarde 76'	Stadium: Franz Horr Stadium; Attendance: 15,600; Referee: Sebastian Gishamer

=== Austrian Cup ===
LASK entered the Austrian Cup in the first round, and were drawn away to Regionalliga East team Wiener Sport-Club. In the second round, they were drawn away to Regionalliga East side SV Horn. They were then drawn away to 2. Liga side SV Stripfing in the third round, then at home to Bundesliga rivals Blau-Weiß Linz in the quarter-finals, and away to Bundesliga rivals SV Ried in the semi-finals.

26 July 2025 First round	Wiener Sport-Club	0–4	LASK	Vienna
18:00 CEST		Report	Adeniran 12', 28'; Andrade 15'; Lang 22'	Stadium: Hohe Warte Stadium; Attendance: 3,500; Referee: Julian Schnur

27 August 2025 Second round	SV Horn	0–2	LASK	Horn
20:30 CEST		Report	Kačavenda 9'; Smakaj 31'	Stadium: Sparkasse Horn Arena; Attendance: 1,918; Referee: Emil Ristoskov

28 October 2025 Third round	SV Stripfing	0–2	LASK	Wiener Neustadt
20:30 CET		Report	Andrade 43'; Cissé 61'	Stadium: Wiener Neustadt Arena; Attendance: 643; Referee: Florian Jäger

30 January 2026 Quarter-finals	LASK	3–2	Blau-Weiß Linz	Linz
18:00 CET	Kalajdžić 35'; Bello 57'; Usor 83'	Report	Dahlqvist 2'; Weissman 18'	Stadium: Raiffeisen Arena; Attendance: 17,498; Referee: Stefan Ebner

18 March 2026 Semi-finals	SV Ried	1–2 (a.e.t.)	LASK	Ried im Innkreis
18:00 CET	Rossdorfer 49'	Report	Adeniran 51'; Havenaar 109' (o.g.)	Stadium: BWT X Upper Austrian Arena; Attendance: 7,336; Referee: Sebastian Gishamer

1 May 2026 Final	LASK	4–2 (a.e.t.)	Rheindorf Altach	Klagenfurt
16:00 CEST	Usor 11'; Adeniran 66', 104'; Bello 101'	Report	Greil 5'; Demaku 29'	Stadium: Wörthersee Stadion; Attendance: 22,000; Referee: Julian Weinberger
