= 2026–27 LASK season =

LASK
2026–27 season
- Owner: LASK GmbH
- President: Siegmund Gruber
- Manager: Dietmar Kühbauer
- Stadium: Raiffeisen Arena
- Austrian Football Bundesliga: 3rd
- Austrian Cup: Third round
- UEFA Champions League: League stage
- Top goalscorer: League: Christoph Lang (5); All: Samuel Adeniran (7)
Home colours	Away colours	Third colours
- All statistics correct as of 20 September 2026.

The 2026–27 season is the 119th season in the history of Linzer Athletik-Sport-Klub and their tenth consecutive season in Austrian Bundesliga, the top tier of Austrian football. In addition to the domestic league, the club is participating in the Austrian Cup and UEFA Champions League.

== Coaching staff ==
As of 17 May 2026

Position	Staff
Head coach	(Austria) Dietmar Kühbauer
Assistant coach	(Austria) Maximilian Ritscher (Austria) Manfred Nastl
Goalkeeper coach	(Austria) Philip Großalber
Athletic coach	(Germany) Leopold Angerer
Video analyst	(Slovenia) Mario Milanič

== Squad ==
Note: Flags indicate national team as defined under FIFA eligibility rules; some limited exceptions apply. Players may hold more than one non-FIFA nationality.

No.	Pos.	Nation	Player
1	GK	AUT	Lukas Jungwirth
2	DF	USA	George Bello
3	DF	JAM	Miguel Freckleton
4	DF	NED	Xavier Mbuyamba
5	MF	KOS	Art Smakaj
6	DF	SUR	Melayro Bogarde
7	FW	USA	Samuel Adeniran
8	FW	NGR	Moses Usor
9	MF	CZE	Kryštof Daněk
10	MF	CRO	Robert Ljubičić (on laon from AEK Athens)
16	DF	PAN	Andrés Andrade
18	MF	AUT	Alessandro Schöpf

No.	Pos.	Nation	Player
20	DF	DEN	Kasper Jørgensen
21	DF	COD	Manoël Verhaeghe
22	FW	FRA	Ramiz Harakaté
25	DF	CMR	Yvan Dibango
27	FW	AUT	Christoph Lang
29	MF	AUT	Florian Flecker
30	MF	AUT	Sascha Horvath (captain)
33	GK	AUT	Tobias Schützenauer
43	DF	BRA	João Tornich
50	GK	AUT	Fabian Schillinger
52	DF	MLI	Cheikne Kébé

== Transfers ==
=== In ===
Pos.	Player	Transferred from	Fee	Date	Source
MF	(Czech Republic) Kryštof Daněk	(Czech Republic) Sparta Praha	€1,800,000	1 July 2026	
DF	(Cameroon) Yvan Dibango	(Ukraine) Kryvbas Kryvyi Rih	Free	1 July 2026	
MF	(Austria) Alessandro Schöpf	(Austria) Wolfsberger AC	Free	1 July 2026	
DF	(Libya) Daniel Elfadli	(Germany) Hamburger SV	Loan	2 September 2026	

== Competitions ==
=== Overall record ===
Competition	First match	Last match	Starting round	Record							
Competition	First match	Last match	Starting round	Pld	W	D	L	GF	GA	GD	Win %
Austrian Football Bundesliga	1 August 2026		Matchday 1	7	5	1	1	19	7	+12	71.43
Austrian Cup	25 July 2026		First round	2	2	0	0	13	1	+12	100.00
UEFA Champions League	19 August 2026		Play-off round	3	1	0	2	5	5	+0	33.33
Total				12	8	1	3	37	13	+24	66.67

Last updated: 20 September 2026
Source: Soccerway

=== Austrian Football Bundesliga ===
==== Regular season ====
===== League table =====
Pos	Team	Pld	W	D	L	GF	GA	GD	Pts	Qualification
1	SK Rapid	11	10	0	1	33	9	+24	30	Qualification for the Championship round
2	Red Bull Salzburg	11	8	3	0	29	6	+23	27	Qualification for the Championship round
3	LASK	11	7	1	3	26	13	+13	22	Qualification for the Championship round
4	Sturm Graz	11	5	4	2	19	13	+6	19	Qualification for the Championship round
5	TSV Hartberg	11	5	2	4	20	19	+1	17	Qualification for the Championship round

Updated to match(es) played on 1 November 2026. Source: Austrian Football Bundesliga
Rules for classification: 1) Points; 2) Head-to-head record; 3) Goal difference; 4) Goals scored; 5) Matches won; 6) Away matches won; 7) Away goals scored.

===== Results summary =====
Overall								Home						Away					
Pld	W	D	L	GF	GA	GD	Pts	W	D	L	GF	GA	GD	W	D	L	GF	GA	GD
9	6	1	2	23	9	+14	19	3	0	1	10	3	+7	3	1	1	13	6	+7

Last updated: 17 October 2026.
Source: ADMIRAL Bundesliga

===== Results by round =====
Round	1	2	3	4	5	6	7	8	9
Ground	H	A	H	A	H	A	A	H	A
Result	W	W	W	W	W	L	D	L	W
Position	1	1	2	1	1	1	3	3	3
Points	3	6	9	12	15	15	16	16	19

Updated to match(es) played on 17 October 2026. Source: ADMIRAL Bundesliga
A = Away; H = Home; W = Win; D = Draw; L = Loss; P = Postponed

===== Matches =====
The regular season league fixtures were released on 25 June 2026.

Win Draw Loss Fixtures

31 July 2026 1	LASK	3–0	Grazer AK	Linz
20:30 CEST	Adeniran 20', 29' (pen.); Lang 79'	Report	Pines (yellow card) 28'; Klassen (yellow card) 72'	Stadium: Raiffeisen Arena; Attendance: 13,276; Referee: Sebastian Gishamer

9 August 2026 2	Austria Wien	0–2	LASK	Wien
19:00 CEST	Dragović (red card) 82'; Handl (yellow card) 86'; Ranftl (yellow card) 86'	Report	Andrade 54'; Usor 83'; Adeniran (yellow card) 89'; Mbuyamba (yellow card) 90'	Stadium: Franz Horr Stadium; Attendance: 12,442; Referee: Arnes Talic

14 August 2026 3	LASK	4–1	SV Ried	Linz
20:30 CEST	Adeniran 10', 27'; Usor 18'; Lang 57'; Ljubičić (red card) 74'	Report	Sissoko 8'; Malicsek (yellow card) 70'; Chukwudi (yellow card) 73'; Boguo (yellow card) 90+2'	Stadium: Raiffeisen Arena; Attendance: 14,507; Referee: Alain Sadikovski

29 August 2026 5	LASK	3–0	SCR Altach	Linz
19:30 CEST	Lang 3', 19'; Mbuyamba (yellow card) 50'; Tornich (yellow card) 55'; Flecker 89'	Report	Diawara (yellow card) 47'; Demaku (yellow card) 53'; Greil (yellow card) 54'; Milojević (yellow card) 66'	Stadium: Raiffeisen Arena; Attendance: 12,659; Referee: Alexander Harkam

1 September 2026 4	Wolfsberger AC	1–3	LASK	Wolfsberg
19:30 CEST	Behounek (red card) 2'; Wohlmuth 34'; Mamageishvili (yellow card) 70'	Report	Dibango (yellow card) 33'; Usor (yellow card) 44'; Mbuyamba 54', (yellow card) 66'; Bogarde 68'; Schöpf 84'	Stadium: Lavanttal-Arena; Attendance: 4,731; Referee: Christian-Petru Ciochirca

13 September 2026 6	Sturm Graz	2–1	LASK	Graz
17:00 CEST	Heil (yellow card) 13'; Mamageishvili 36'; Diakité 59'; Rózga (yellow card) 85'; Kiteishvili (yellow card) 85'	Report	Daněk (yellow card) 45+2', (goal) 45+2'; Bogarde (yellow card) 77'; Horvath (yellow card) 85'	Stadium: Liebenauer Stadium; Attendance: 15,878; Referee: Sebastian Gishamer

20 September 2026 7	Hartberg	3–3	LASK	Hartberg
14:30 CEST	Schopp (yellow card) 21'; Radulović 46', 72', (yellow card) 77'; Kainz (yellow card) 68'; Drew 77'; Wilfinger (yellow card) 90+2'	Report	Jorvath 7'; Lang 30'; Andrade 58'	Stadium: Stadion Hartberg; Attendance: 3,096; Referee: Şafak Barmaksızoğlu

11 October 2026 8	LASK	0–2	SK Rapid	Linz
17:00 CEST	Bogarde (yellow card) 16'		Kara 58', (yellow card) 59'; Mbuyi 82'	Stadium: Raiffeisen Arena; Attendance: 19,080; Referee: Arnes Talic

17 October 2026 9	Austria Lustenau	0–4	LASK	Lustenau
17:00 CEST	Soares (yellow card) 16'		Kalajdžić 56'; Flecker (yellow card) 57'; Adeniran 64'; Lang 88', 90+4'	Stadium: Reichshofstadion; Attendance: 4,061; Referee: Emil Ristoskov Referee Stats

=== Austrian Cup ===
25 July 2026 First round	SC Kalsdorf	0–7	LASK	Kalsdorf bei Graz
18:00 CEST	Mate (yellow card) 50'	Report	Andrade 39', (yellow card) 67'; Lang 53', 61', 79' (pen.), 90+2'; Adeniran 69'; Daněk 90'	Stadium: Sportzentrum Kalsdorf; Attendance: 1,200; Referee: Philip Gadler

5 September 2026 Second round	Deutschlandsberger SC	1–6	LASK	Deutschlandsberg
15:30 CEST	Degen 48'	Report	Lang 10'; Kane 15', 55'; Daněk 22'; Flecker 36'; Horvath 67'; Verhaeghe (yellow card) 72'	Stadium: Koralmstadion Kunstrasen; Attendance: 2,500; Referee: Davor Divkovic

27 October 2026 Third round	LASK	v	SV Ried	Linz
TBC		Report		Stadium: Raiffeisen Arena

=== UEFA Champions League ===
==== Play-off round ====
The play-off round draw was held on 3 August 2026.

19 August 2026 First leg	Celtic (Scotland)	3–0	(Austria) LASK	Glasgow, Scotland
20:00 BST	Nygren 26'; Durán 38', 67'	Report	Jørgensen (yellow card) 82'	Stadium: Celtic Park; Attendance: 55,882; Referee: Sandro Schärer (Switzerland)

25 August 2026 Second leg	LASK (Austria)	5–1 (a.e.t.) (5–4 agg.)	(Scotland) Celtic	Linz, Austria
21:00 CEST	Usor 32', (yellow card) 71'; Ljubičić 48'; Adeniran 58', 109', (penalty missed) 115'; Flecker 90'; Alemão (yellow card) 90+3'	Report	McGregor 21'; McCowan (yellow card) 103'	Stadium: Raiffeisen Arena; Attendance: 16,252; Referee: Szymon Marciniak (Poland)

==== League phase ====
The league phase draw was held on 27 August 2026.

Pos	Team	Pld	W	D	L	GF	GA	GD	Pts	Qualification
13	(Belgium) Club Brugge	3	2	0	1	9	6	+3	6	Advance to knockout phase play-offs (seeded)
14	(Italy) Inter Milan	4	2	0	2	8	6	+2	6	Advance to knockout phase play-offs (seeded)
15	(Austria) LASK	4	2	0	2	10	9	+1	6	Advance to knockout phase play-offs (seeded)
16	(Germany) Borussia Dortmund	3	2	0	1	5	4	+1	6	Advance to knockout phase play-offs (seeded)
17	(England) Manchester United	4	2	0	2	8	8	0	6	Advance to knockout phase play-offs (unseeded)

Updated to match(es) played on 3 November 2026. Source: UEFA
Rules for classification: League phase tiebreakers

Round	1	2	3	4	5	6	7	8
Ground	A	H	A	H	A	H	A	H
Result	L	L	W	W				
Position	27	33	24					
Points	0	0	3	6				

Updated to match(es) played on 3 November 2026. Source: UEFA
A = Away; H = Home; W = Win; D = Draw; L = Loss

Win Draw Loss Fixtures

8 September 2026 1	AEK Athens (Greece)	1–0	(Austria) LASK	Athens, Greece
19:45 EEST	Marin 21'; Jović (yellow card) 40'	Report	Bogarde (yellow card) 42'; Andrade (yellow card) 80'	Stadium: Agia Sophia Stadium; Attendance: 30,221; Referee: Luís Godinho (Portugal)

14 October 2026 2	LASK (Austria)	3–6	(England) Liverpool	Linz, Austria
18:45 CEST	Ljubičić 63'; Flecker 74', 77'; Elfadli (yellow card) 80'	Report	Araújo 22'; Barcola 24', 37', 66'; Frimpong 51'; Koumas 72'	Stadium: Raiffeisen Arena; Attendance: 18,910; Referee: Tobias Stieler (Germany)

21 October 2026 3	Sporting CP (Portugal)	2–3	(Austria) LASK	Lisbon, Portugal
20:00 WEST	Suárez 5' (pen.), 89'; Doumbia (yellow card) 64'; Simões (yellow card) 65'	Report	Lang 15', (yellow card) 33'; Horvath (yellow card) 45'; Kalajdžić 63', (yellow card) 72'; Daněk 68', (yellow card) 90+1'; Schützenauer (yellow card) 89'	Stadium: Estádio José Alvalade; Attendance: 48,965; Referee: Nick Walsh (Scotland)

3 November 2026 4	LASK (Austria)	4–0	(Slovakia) Slovan Bratislava	Linz, Austria
21:00 CET	Jørgensen 19', 37'; Ljubičić 44'; Adeniran 48'	Report	Martínez (yellow card) 25'; Wimmer (yellow card) 36'	Stadium: Raiffeisen Arena; Attendance: 17,246; Referee: Donatas Rumšas (Lithuania)

24 November 2026 5	Bodø/Glimt (Norway)	v	(Austria) LASK	Bodø, Norway
18:45 CET		Report		Stadium: Aspmyra Stadion

9 December 2026 6	LASK (Austria)	v	(Turkey) Fenerbahçe	Linz, Austria
21:00 CET		Report		Stadium: Raiffeisen Arena

19 January 2027 7	Real Madrid (Spain)	v	(Austria) LASK	Madrid, Spain
21:00 CET		Report		Stadium: Bernabéu

27 January 2027 8	LASK (Austria)	v	(Portugal) Porto	Linz, Austria
21:00 CET		Report		Stadium: Raiffeisen Arena
