= 2024–25 LASK season =

Season of Austrian football club LASK

LASK
2024–25 season
- Owner: LASK GmbH
- President: Siegmund Gruber
- Head coach: Thomas Darazs (until 3 September); Markus Schopp (from 3 September to 21 April); Maximilian Ritscher (interim)
- Stadium: Raiffeisen Arena
- Austrian Bundesliga: 7th
- Austrian Cup: Semi-finals
- UEFA Europa League: Play-off round
- UEFA Conference League: League phase
- Top goalscorer: League: Maximilian Entrup (12 goals); All: Maximilian Entrup; Robert Žulj (13 each)
- Highest home attendance: 15,640 (v. Red Bull Salzburg, Austrian Bundesliga, 17 August 2024)
- Lowest home attendance: 8,500 (v. Cercle Brugge, UEFA Conference League, 7 November 2024)
- Average home league attendance: 12,353
- Biggest win: 6–0 v. Austria Klagenfurt (H); Austrian Bundesliga, 26 April 2025
- Biggest defeat: 0–7 v. Fiorentina (A); UEFA Conference League, 12 December 2024
Home colours	Away colours

The 2024–25 season was the 117th season in the history of LASK, and the club's eighth consecutive season in Austrian Football Bundesliga. In addition to the domestic league, the team participated in the Austrian Cup, the UEFA Europa League and the UEFA Conference League.

== Players ==
=== First-team squad ===
As of 1 June 2025

Note: Flags indicate national team as defined under FIFA eligibility rules; some limited exceptions apply. Players may hold more than one non-FIFA nationality.

No.	Pos.	Nation	Player
1	GK	AUT	Tobias Lawal
2	DF	USA	George Bello
5	DF	GER	Philipp Ziereis
6	MF	NED	Melayro Bogarde
7	FW	USA	Samuel Adeniran
8	FW	NGR	Moses Usor
9	FW	CZE	Kryštof Daněk (on loan from Sparta Prague)
10	MF	AUT	Robert Žulj (captain)
11	FW	AUT	Maximilian Entrup
14	MF	KOS	Valon Berisha
16	DF	PAN	Andrés Andrade
17	DF	GER	Jérôme Boateng
18	MF	SRB	Branko Jovičić

No.	Pos.	Nation	Player
19	FW	FRA	Lenny Pintor
21	MF	AUT	Ivan Ljubic
22	DF	MNE	Filip Stojković
23	FW	GHA	Ibrahim Mustapha
25	FW	FRA	Alexis Tibidi
26	DF	CRO	Hrvoje Smolčić (on loan from Eintracht Frankfurt)
27	FW	AUT	Christoph Lang
29	FW	AUT	Florian Flecker
30	MF	AUT	Sascha Horvath
32	MF	MLI	Ismaila Coulibaly
35	MF	AUT	Marco Sulzner
44	FW	FRA	Adil Taoui
47	DF	SEN	Modou Kéba Cissé

== Transfers ==
=== In ===
On 31 May, LASK signed German defender Jérôme Boateng after the end of his contract with Salernitana from Serie A.

Pos.	Player	Transferred from	Fee	Date	Source
DF	(Germany) Jérôme Boateng	(Italy) Salernitana	Free	1 July 2024	
DF	(Croatia) Hrvoje Smolčić	(Germany) Eintracht Frankfurt	Loan	1 July 2024	
FW	(Austria) Maximilian Entrup	(Austria) Hartberg	€1,300,000	5 July 2024	
MF	(France) Alexis Tibidi	(France) ES Troyes AC	Undisclosed	10 July 2024	
DF	(Portugal) Tomás Tavares	(Russia) Spartak Moscow	Loan	23 July 2024	
MF	(Mali) Mohamed Sanogo	(Austria) First Vienna	Undislcosed	1 January 2025	
MF	(Mali) Ismaila Coulibaly	(England) Sheffield United	Undislcosed	3 January 2025	

=== Out ===
Pos.	Player	Transferred to	Fee	Date	Source
DF	(Austria) Felix Luckeneder	(Germany) Wehen Wiesbaden	Undisclosed	25 July 2024	
FW	(Germany) Lucas Copado	(Germany) Energie Cottbus	Loan	22 August 2024	
DF	(Austria) Luca Wimhofer	(Austria) SV Horn	Loan	5 September 2024	
MF	(Austria) René Renner		Contract terminated	1 January 2025	

== Pre-season and friendlies ==
Win Draw Loss Fixtures

28 June 2024 Friendly	ASKÖ Oedt	1–7	LASK	Traun, Austria
19:00	Karatas 31' (pen.)	Report	Copado 26'; Flecker 52'; Ljubičić 54'; Smolčić 68'; Taoui 83', 87'; Pintor 90'	Stadium: Transdanubia Sportanlage

2 July 2024 Friendly	LASK	1–1	CFR Cluj	Pasching, Austria
17:00	Safin 84'	Report	Ilie 41'; Tachtsidis (yellow card) 69'	Stadium: Waldstadion

5 July 2024 Friendly	LASK	2–2	Dynamo České Budějovice	Pasching, Austria
16:00	Žulj 9'; Flecker 30'	Report	Čermák 12'; Sigut 58'	Stadium: Waldstadion

11 July 2024 Nero Summer Series Upper Austria	LASK	3–2	Galatasaray	Linz, Austria
19:30	Dubois 23' (o.g.); Copado 63'; Koné 85'	Report	Baltacı 56', 71'	Stadium: Raiffeisen Arena; Attendance: 9,230; Referee: Weinberger

16 July 2024 Friendly	LASK	0–0	Puskás Akadémia	Pasching, Austria
16:00		Report		Stadium: Waldstadion

20 July 2024 Nero Summer Series Upper Austria	LASK	2–0	St. Pölten	Linz, Austria
15:00	Flecker 68'; Ljubičić 90+5'	Report		Stadium: Raiffeisen Arena; Attendance: 3,200

5 September 2024 Friendly	LASK	Cancelled	First Vienna	Austria
14:00

16 January 2025 Friendly	LASK	2–3	Paks	Austria
12:30

21 January 2025 Friendly	LASK	0–0	Admira Wacker	Austria
14:30

26 January 2025 Friendly	LASK	2–0	Union Gurten
15:00

21 March 2025 Friendly	LASK	1–1	Ried
11:00

== Competitions ==
=== Overall record ===
Competition	First match	Last match	Starting round	Final position	Record							
Competition	First match	Last match	Starting round	Final position	Pld	W	D	L	GF	GA	GD	Win %
Austrian Football Bundesliga	3 August 2024	1 June 2025	Matchday 1	7th	35	18	6	11	56	40	+16	51.43
Austrian Cup	26 July 2024	2 April 2025	First round	Semi-finals	5	4	1	0	12	3	+9	80.00
UEFA Europa League	22 August 2024	29 August 2024	Play-off round	Play-off round	2	0	1	1	1	2	−1	0.00
UEFA Conference League	3 October 2024	19 December 2024	League phase	League phase	6	0	3	3	4	14	−10	0.00
Total					48	22	11	15	73	59	+14	45.83

Last updated: 1 June 2025
Source: Soccerway

=== Austrian Football Bundesliga ===
==== Regular season ====
===== League table =====
Pos	Team	Pld	W	D	L	GF	GA	GD	Pts	Qualification
5	Rapid Wien	22	9	7	6	32	24	+8	34	Qualification for the Championship round
6	Blau-Weiß Linz	22	10	3	9	30	29	+1	33	Qualification for the Championship round
7	LASK	22	9	4	9	32	33	−1	31	Qualification for the Relegation round
8	TSV Hartberg	22	6	8	8	24	31	−7	26	Qualification for the Relegation round
9	Austria Klagenfurt	22	5	6	11	22	44	−22	21	Qualification for the Relegation round

Source: Austrian Football Bundesliga
Rules for classification: 1) Points; 2) Head-to-head record; 3) Goal difference; 4) Goals scored; 5) Matches won; 6) Away matches won; 7) Away goals scored.

===== Results summary =====
Overall								Home						Away					
Pld	W	D	L	GF	GA	GD	Pts	W	D	L	GF	GA	GD	W	D	L	GF	GA	GD
22	9	4	9	32	33	−1	31	4	2	5	17	18	−1	5	2	4	15	15	0

Last updated: 16 March 2025.
Source: ADMIRAL Bundesliga

===== Results by round =====
Round	1	2	3	4	5	6	7	8	9	10	11	12	13	14	15	16	17	18	19	20	21	22
Ground	A	H	H	A	H	A	H	A	H	A	H	H	A	A	H	A	H	A	H	A	H	A
Result	W	L	L	L	L	L	W	D	W	W	L	D	W	W	L	L	D	D	W	W	W	L
Position	3	8	9	10	11	11	9	11	9	7	8	9	7	5	6	7	7	7	6	6	5	7
Points	3	3	3	3	3	3	6	7	10	13	13	14	17	20	20	20	21	22	25	28	31	31

Source: ADMIRAL Bundesliga
A = Away; H = Home; W = Win; D = Draw; L = Loss; P = Postponed

===== Matches =====
The regular season league fixtures were released on 28 June 2024.

Win Draw Loss Fixtures

3 August 2024 1	TSV Hartberg	1–2	LASK	Hartberg
17:00 CEST	Kainz (yellow card) 34'; Prokop 61'; Fillafer (yellow card) 76'	Report	Ziereis 29'; Ljubičić (yellow card) 39'; Bogarde 57'	Stadium: Stadion Hartberg; Attendance: 2,957; Referee: Markus Hameter

10 August 2024 2	LASK	1–2	Rheindorf Altach	Linz
17:00 CEST	Žulj 18'; Ziereis (yellow card) 50'	Report	Bähre (yellow card) 7'; Gustavo 27', 69', (yellow card) 71'; Strunz (yellow card) 73'; Kronberger (yellow card) 88'	Stadium: Raiffeisen Arena; Attendance: 11,387; Referee: Walter Altmann

17 August 2024 3	LASK	0–1	Red Bull Salzburg	Linz
19:30 CEST	Ziereis (yellow card) 11'; Jovičić (yellow card) 30'; Tibidi (yellow card) 84'	Report	Yeo 64'; Daghim (yellow card) 71'	Stadium: Raiffeisen Arena; Attendance: 15,640; Referee: Alexander Harkam

25 August 2024 4	Austria Wien	2–1	LASK	Vienna
17:00 CEST	Malone 21'; Fischer (yellow card) 42', (goal) 87'	Report	Ljubičić 19'; Stojković (yellow card) 76'	Stadium: Franz Horr Stadium; Attendance: 11,796; Referee: Christian-Petru Ciochirca

1 September 2024 5	LASK	1–5	Wolfsberger AC	Linz
17:00 CEST	Berisha (yellow card) 35'; Horvath (red card) 40'; Ljubičić 90+2' (pen.)	Report	Piesinger 14', (yellow card) 71'; Ballo (yellow card) 26'; Atanga 30'; Ullmann 48', 85'; Omić 51'; Baumgartner (yellow card) 90+2'	Stadium: Raiffeisen Arena; Attendance: 10,183; Referee: Daniel Pfister

14 September 2024 6	Blau-Weiß Linz	1–0	LASK	Linz
19:30 CEST	Ronivaldo 16', (yellow card) 41'; Briedl (yellow card) 73'; Mensah (red card) 90+3'	Report	Smolčić (yellow card) 56'; Taoui (yellow card) 60'	Stadium: Donauparkstadion; Attendance: 5,595; Referee: Harald Lechner

21 September 2024 7	LASK	4–2	Grazer AK	Linz
17:00 CEST	Berisha 14'; Ljubičić 22' (pen.), 64'; Jovičić (yellow card) 45+1'; Taoui (yellow card) 57', (goal) 90+5'; Bello (yellow card) 58'; Talovierov (yellow card) 70'	Report	Vučić 30'; Lichtenberger 51'; Schriebl (yellow card) 87'	Stadium: Raiffeisen Arena; Attendance: 12,975; Referee: Julian Weinberger

28 September 2024 8	Rapid Wien	1–1	LASK	Vienna
17:00 CEST	Burgstaller 27'; Raux-Yao (yellow card) 86'	Report	Žulj 46'; Ljubičić (yellow card) 50'; Stojković (yellow card) 58'	Stadium: Allianz Stadion; Attendance: 21,350; Referee: Christopher Jäger

6 October 2024 9	LASK	4–0	Austria Klagenfurt	Linz
14:30 CEST	Žulj 26'; Flecker (yellow card) 50'; Jovičić (yellow card) 54'; Entrup 56'; Robatsch 70' (o.g.); Mustapha 90'	Report		Stadium: Raiffeisen Arena; Attendance: 10,732; Referee: Christian-Petru Ciochirca

20 October 2024 10	WSG Tirol	1–2	LASK	Innsbruck
14:30 CEST	Üstündag 16'; Lawrence (yellow card) 35'; Sulzbacher (yellow card) 84'; Blume (yellow card) 90+3'	Report	Berisha 40'; Entrup 87'	Stadium: Tivoli Stadion Tirol; Attendance: 2,420; Referee: Arnes Talic

27 October 2024 11	LASK	1–2	Sturm Graz	Linz
17:00 CET	Ljubičić (yellow card) 30'; Ziereis (yellow card) 41'; Smolčić 60'; Stojković (yellow card) 88'	Report	Kiteishvili 33'; Biereth (yellow card) 36'; Jatta (yellow card) 58'; Zvonarek 85'; Johnston (yellow card) 90+9'	Stadium: Raiffeisen Arena; Attendance: 15,376; Referee: Harald Lechner

2 November 2024 12	LASK	1–1	TSV Hartberg	Linz
17:00 CET	Bello (yellow card) 22'; Smolčić 48'; Bogarde (yellow card) 74'	Report	Prokop (yellow card) 31'; Mijić 45+1'; Karamatic (yellow card) 75'; Diarra (yellow card) 90+1'	Stadium: Raiffeisen Arena; Attendance: 10,179; Referee: Markus Hameter

10 November 2024 13	Rheindorf Altach	1–2	LASK	Altach
14:30 CET	Estrada 65'; Ingolistch (yellow card) 90+6'	Report	Entrup (yellow card) 23', (goal) 90', 90+4'; Taoui (yellow card) 44'; Smolčić (yellow card) 75'; Flecker (yellow card) 90+6'	Stadium: Stadion Schnabelholz; Attendance: 4,793; Referee: Sebastian Gishamer

23 November 2024 14	Red Bull Salzburg	1–2	LASK	Salzburg
17:00 CET	Yeo (yellow card) 42', (goal) 62'	Report	Konaté 73' (o.g.); Entrup 88'	Stadium: Red Bull Arena; Attendance: 12,923; Referee: Jakob Semler

1 December 2024 15	LASK	1–3	Austria Wien	Linz
17:00 CET	Bogarde (yellow card) 64'; Flecker 72'; Taoui (yellow card) 90+9'; Stojković (red card) 90+9'	Report	Fischer 20'; Barry 48'; Prelec (yellow card) 68'; Malone 78'; Plavotić (yellow card) 90+9'	Stadium: Raiffeisen Arena; Attendance: 14,467; Referee: Christian-Petru Ciochirca

7 December 2024 16	Wolfsberger AC	2–1	LASK	Wolfsberg
17:00 CET	Talovierov 47' (o.g.); Kojzek 50'	Report	Entrup 43'	Stadium: Lavanttal-Arena; Attendance: 2,721; Referee: Julian Weinberger

9 February 2025 17	LASK	0–0	Blau-Weiß Linz	Linz
17:00 CET	Smolčić (yellow card) 40'; Adeniran (yellow card) 90+6'	Report	Pirkl (red card) 75'; Schmidt (yellow card) 90+6'	Stadium: Raiffeisen Arena; Attendance: 19,022; Referee: Walter Altmann

16 February 2025 18	Grazer AK	0–0	LASK	Graz
14:30 CET	Jano (yellow card) 84'; Tikvić (yellow card) 87'; Kleinheisler (yellow card) 90+3'	Report	Bogarde (yellow card) 22'; Ljubic (yellow card) 58'; Adeniran (yellow card) 80'; Jovičić (yellow card) 90+3'	Stadium: Liebenauer Stadium; Attendance: 7,197; Referee: Christopher Jäger

23 February 2025 19	LASK	2–1	Rapid Wien	Linz
17:00 CET	Lang 31', (yellow card) 59'; Berisha (yellow card) 33'; Cissé (yellow card) 74'; Bello 79'	Report	Radulović 90'	Stadium: Raiffeisen Arena; Attendance: 14,978; Referee: Christian-Petru Ciochirca

2 March 2025 20	Austria Klagenfurt	1–2	LASK	Klagenfurt am Wörthersee
14:30 CET	Bonnah 3'; Koch (yellow card) 48'; Toshevski (yellow card) 90'	Report	Berisha 14'; Bello (yellow card) 36'; Adeniran (yellow card) 48'; Ziereis (yellow card) 57'; Entrup 61', (yellow card) 72'	Stadium: Wörthersee Stadion; Attendance: 3,380; Referee: Florian Jäger

9 March 2025 21	LASK	2–1	WSG Tirol	Linz
17:00 CET	Ljubic 42', (yellow card) 71'; Jovičić (yellow card) 48'; Cissé (yellow card) 57'; Ziereis (yellow card) 86'; Žulj 90+4'	Report	Naschberger 24'; Taferner (yellow card) 55'; Hinterseer (yellow card) 56'; Üstündag (yellow card) 74'	Stadium: Raiffeisen Arena; Attendance: 10,875; Referee: Arnes Talic

16 March 2025 22	Sturm Graz	4–2	LASK	Graz
17:00 CET	Horvat 31'; Kiteishvili 50' (pen.); Lavalée (red card) 68'; Bøving 84', 90+5' (pen.)	Report	Boateng (yellow card) 49'; Bello (yellow card) 70'; Cissé 77'; Žulj 85'	Stadium: Liebenauer Stadium; Attendance: 16,236; Referee: Christopher Jäger

==== Relegation round ====
===== League table =====
Pos	Team	Pld	W	D	L	GF	GA	GD	Pts	Qualification
1	LASK	32	16	6	10	51	36	+15	38	Qualification for the Conference League play-offs
2	TSV Hartberg	32	11	11	10	40	40	0	31	Qualification for the Conference League play-offs
3	WSG Tirol	32	7	9	16	35	50	−15	20	
4	Grazer AK	32	5	13	14	34	54	−20	20	
5	Rheindorf Altach	32	5	11	16	29	46	−17	18	

Source: Austrian Football Bundesliga
Rules for classification: 1) Points; 2) Points with (possible) half points subtracted due to rounding; 3) Head-to-head points; 4) Head-to-head goal difference; 5) Head-to-head goals scored; 6) Goal difference; 7) Goals scored; 8) Matches won; 9) Away matches won; 10) Away goals scored.

===== Results summary =====
Overall								Home						Away					
Pld	W	D	L	GF	GA	GD	Pts	W	D	L	GF	GA	GD	W	D	L	GF	GA	GD
10	7	2	1	19	3	+16	23	3	2	0	9	0	+9	4	0	1	10	3	+7

Last updated: 23 May 2025.
Source: ADMIRAL Bundesliga

===== Results by round =====
Round	23	24	25	26	27	28	29	30	31	32
Ground	A	H	A	H	A	H	A	H	A	H
Result	W	W	W	W	W	W	W	D	L	D
Position	7	7	7	7	7	7	7	7	7	7
Points	18	21	24	27	30	33	36	37	37	38

Source: ADMIRAL Bundesliga
A = Away; H = Home; W = Win; D = Draw; L = Loss; P = Postponed

===== Matches =====
The relegation round league fixtures were released on 17 March 2025.

Win Draw Loss Fixtures

28 March 2025 23	Rheindorf Altach	0–2	LASK	Altach
19:30 CET	Mustapha (yellow card) 7'; Fadinger (yellow card) 90+1'	Report	Andrade 28'; Bello (yellow card) 52'; Daněk 59'; Ziereis (yellow card) 88'	Stadium: Stadion Schnabelholz; Attendance: 4,257; Referee: Harald Lechner

5 April 2025 24	LASK	1–0	Grazer AK	Linz
17:00 CEST	Bogarde (yellow card) 29' (yellow-red card) 84'; Jovičić 72' (o.g.); Cissé (yellow card) 77'; Jovičić (yellow card) 84'; Flecker (yellow card) 90+2'	Report	Kreuzriegler (yellow card) 35'	Stadium: Raiffeisen Arena; Attendance: 9,502; Referee: Daniel Pfister

12 April 2025 25	TSV Hartberg	0–1	LASK	Hartberg
17:00 CEST	Demir (yellow card) 43'; Diarra (yellow card) 53' (yellow-red card) 72'	Report	Entrup 22'; Jovičić (yellow card) 74'; Flecker (yellow card) 75'	Stadium: Stadion Hartberg; Attendance: 3,263; Referee: Emil Ristoskov

18 April 2025 26	LASK	2–0	WSG Tirol	Linz
19:30 CEST	Žulj (yellow card) 34', (goal) 53'; Cissé (yellow card) 38'; Lang 50'	Report	Okungbowa (yellow card) 64'; Naschberger (yellow card) 83'	Stadium: Raiffeisen Arena; Attendance: 9,134; Referee: Jakob Semler

22 April 2025 27	Austria Klagenfurt	1–4	LASK	Klagenfurt am Wörthersee
20:30 CEST	Toshevski 31'	Report	Horvath 12'; Entrup 15', 54'; Coulibaly (yellow card) 57'; Flecker 84'	Stadium: Wörthersee Stadion; Attendance: 2,913; Referee: Julian Weinberger

26 April 2025 28	LASK	6–0	Austria Klagenfurt	Linz
17:00 CEST	Horvath 27'; Flecker 42'; Entrup 60'; Coulibaly 66'; Žulj 73'; Andrade (yellow card) 76'; Adeniran 84'	Report	Bennetts (yellow card) 50'; Koch (yellow card) 59'; Cvetko (yellow card) 68'	Stadium: Raiffeisen Arena; Attendance: 9,666; Referee: Alexander Harkam

3 May 2025 29	WSG Tirol	1–3	LASK	Innsbruck
17:00 CEST	Lawrence 50'	Report	Entrup 46', (yellow card) 59'; Smolčić 58'; Lang 65'; Jovičić (yellow card) 89'	Stadium: Tivoli Stadion Tirol; Attendance: 2,000; Referee: Josef Spurny

10 May 2025 30	LASK	0–0	TSV Hartberg	Linz
17:00 CEST	Coulibaly (yellow card) 56'; Horvath (yellow card) 60'	Report	Omoregie (yellow card) 31'; Demir (yellow card) 72'	Stadium: Raiffeisen Arena; Attendance: 10,306; Referee: Isa Simsek

17 May 2025 31	Grazer AK	1–0	LASK	Graz
17:00 CEST	Fofana (yellow card) 59'; Cipot 72'	Report	Andrade (red card) 14'; Flecker (yellow card) 18'; Smolčić (yellow card) 66'; Coulibaly (yellow card) 76'; Adeniran (yellow card) 90+2'	Stadium: Liebenauer Stadium; Attendance: 9,703; Referee: Christopher Jäger

23 May 2025 32	LASK	0–0	Rheindorf Altach	Linz
19:30 CEST	Sulzner (yellow card) 1'; Ljubic (yellow card) 66'	Report	Estrada (yellow card) 45+2'; Jäger (yellow card) 58'	Stadium: Raiffeisen Arena; Attendance: 9,424; Referee: Christian-Petru Ciochirca

==== Conference League play-offs ====
LASK finished 7th in the relegation round, and faced 8th-placed TSV Hartberg in the semi-final. In the two-legged final, LASK played 5th-placed Rapid Wien, first leg at home then second leg away.

Win Draw Loss Fixtures

26 May 2025 Semi-final	LASK	2–0	TSV Hartberg	Linz
19:00 CEST	Entrup 22', (yellow card) 62'; Andrade 65'	Report	Komposch (yellow card) 62'; Avdijaj (yellow card) 87'	Stadium: Raiffeisen Arena; Attendance: 8,094; Referee: Julian Weinberger

29 May 2025 Final First leg	LASK	3–1	Rapid Wien	Linz
17:00 CEST	Žulj 5', 90+2', (yellow card) 90+2'; Coulibaly (yellow card) 25', (goal) 66'; Smolčić (yellow card) 51'	Report	Seidl 26' (pen.); Vincze (yellow card) 46'	Stadium: Raiffeisen Arena; Attendance: 13,220; Referee: Alexander Harkam

1 June 2025 Final Second leg	Rapid Wien	3–0 (4–3 agg.)	LASK	Vienna
17:00 CEST	Vincze (yellow card) 16'; Burgstaller 31', (yellow card) 45'; Cvetković (yellow card) 38'; Seidl 80' (pen.); Kara 90+5', (yellow card) 90+6'	Report	Ljubic (yellow card) 22'; Žulj (yellow card) 65'; Lawal (yellow card) 79'; Daněk (yellow card) 80'	Stadium: Allianz Stadion; Attendance: 18,125; Referee: Christopher Jäger

=== Austrian Cup ===
LASK entered the Austrian Cup the first round, and were drawn away to Regionalliga Mitte team Union Gurten. In the second round, they were drawn away to Regionalliga Ost side Sportunion Mauer. They were then drawn away to 2. League side ASK Voitsberg in the round of 16, at home to Bundesliga side Red Bull Salzburg in the quarter-finals, and at home to Bundesliga side and eventual winners Wolfsberger AC in the semi-finals.

Win Draw Loss Fixtures

26 July 2024 First round	Union Gurten	0–3	LASK	Ried im Innkreis
18:00 CEST	Horner (yellow card) 33'; Wirth (yellow card) 55'; Schott (yellow card) 72'	Report	Berisha 32'; Bello 43'; Bogarde (yellow card) 47'; Smolčić (yellow card) 55'; Usor 84'	Stadium: Klaus-Roitinger-Stadion; Attendance: 3,500; Referee: Ebner Stefan

24 September 2024 Second round	Sportunion Mauer	0–4	LASK	Himberg
18:00 CEST		Report	Žulj 19', 36', 55'; Taoui 68'	Stadium: Waldstadion; Attendance: 1,300; Referee: Sampl Samuel
Note: Fixture was initially scheduled for 27–28 August, but was moved due to LASK's participation in the UEFA Europa League.

30 October 2024 Round of 16	ASK Voitsberg	1–2	LASK	Voitsberg
18:15 CET	Krienzer 33'; Sidar (yellow card) 76'; Pungaršek (yellow card) 90+2'	Report	Bogarde (yellow card) 30'; Žulj 42'; Ziereis 47'; Horvath (yellow card) 80'; Stojković (yellow card) 90'	Stadium: Hans-Blümel-Stadion; Attendance: 2,350; Referee: Josef Spurny

2 February 2025 Quarter-finals	LASK	2–1 (a.e.t.)	Red Bull Salzburg	Linz
18:15 CET	Horvath (yellow card) 60'; Jovičić 71'; Bogarde (yellow card) 74'; Berisha (yellow card) 79'; Adeniran (yellow card) 90+3', (goal) 109'	Report	Gloukh 33'; Yeo (yellow card) 60'; Terzić (yellow card) 79'	Stadium: Raiffeisen Arena; Attendance: 12,310; Referee: Harald Lechner

2 April 2025 Semi-finals	LASK	1–1 (a.e.t.) (2–4 p)	Wolfsberger AC	Linz
18:15 CET	Entrup 5', (yellow card) 105' (yellow-red card) 105'	Report	Nwaiwu (yellow card) 5', (goal) 82'; Jašić (yellow card) 43'; Zukić (yellow card) 43'; Baumgartner (yellow card) 72'; Ballo (yellow card) 112'	Stadium: Raiffeisen Arena; Attendance: 12,900; Referee: Markus Hameter
	Penalties
	Jovičić (penalty scored); Ziereis (penalty missed); Daněk (penalty scored); Adeniran (penalty missed)		(penalty scored) Omić; (penalty scored) Schöpf; (penalty scored) Kojzek; (penalty scored) Ballo

=== UEFA Europa League ===
As the third-place team in Austrian Bundesliga, LASK entered the competition in the play-off round.

==== Play-off round ====
The play-off round draw was held on 5 August 2024, LASK were drawn against Liga I champions FCSB.

Win Draw Loss Fixtures

22 August 2024 First leg	LASK (Austria)	1–1	(Romania) FCSB	Linz, Austria
19:00 CEST	Taoui 34', (yellow card) 38'; Bogarde (yellow card) 35'	Report	Miculescu 45+2', (yellow card) 89'; Dawa (yellow card) 60'; Olaru (yellow card) 68'; Tănase (yellow card) 68'	Stadium: Raiffeisen Arena; Attendance: 10,650; Referee: Allard Lindhout (Netherlands)

29 August 2024 Second leg	FCSB (Romania)	1–0 (2–1 agg.)	(Austria) LASK	Bucharest, Romania
21:30 EEST	Ngezana (yellow card) 31'; Popa (yellow card) 88'; Olaru 90+3'; Tănase (yellow card) 90+4'	Report	Berisha (yellow card) 41'; Usor (yellow card) 46'; Ljubičić (yellow card) 47'; Pintor (yellow card) 87'	Stadium: Steaua Stadium; Attendance: 21,523; Referee: Felix Zwayer (Germany)

=== UEFA Conference League ===
==== League phase ====
The league phase draw was held on 30 August 2024.

Pos	Team	Pld	W	D	L	GF	GA	GD	Pts
32	(Football Association of Wales) The New Saints	6	1	0	5	5	10	−5	3
33	(Football Federation of Belarus) Dinamo Minsk	6	1	0	5	4	13	−9	3
34	(Irish Football Association) Larne	6	1	0	5	3	12	−9	3
35	(Austrian Football Association) LASK	6	0	3	3	4	14	−10	3
36	(Moldovan Football Federation) Petrocub Hîncești	6	0	2	4	4	13	−9	2

Source: UEFA
Rules for classification: League phase tiebreakers

Round	1	2	3	4	5	6
Ground	H	A	H	A	A	H
Result	D	L	D	L	L	L
Position	17	28	30	32	34	35
Points	1	1	2	2	2	3

Source: UEFA
A = Away; H = Home; W = Win; D = Draw; L = Loss

Win Draw Loss Fixtures

3 October 2024 1	LASK (Austria)	2–2	(Sweden) Djurgårdens IF	Linz, Austria
21:00 CEST	Stojković (yellow card) 21'; Berisha 26'; Flecker 49'; Entrup (yellow card) 90+3'	Report	Priske 58'; Nguen 65', (yellow card) 75'; Gulliksen (yellow card) 90+4'	Stadium: Raiffeisen Arena; Attendance: 8,500; Referee: Bulat Sariyev (Kazakhstan)

24 October 2024 2	Olimpija Ljubljana (Slovenia)	2–0	(Austria) LASK	Ljubljana, Slovenia
21:00 CEST	Blanco 14'; Sualehe (yellow card) 48'; Boultam (yellow card) 72'; Pedro Lucas 80', (yellow card) 81'; Muhamedbegović (yellow card) 90+1'	Report	Bogarde (yellow card) 73'; Flecker (yellow card) 90+4'	Stadium: Stožice Stadium; Attendance: 6,558; Referee: Daniele Chiffi (Italy)

7 November 2024 3	LASK (Austria)	0–0	(Belgium) Cercle Brugge	Linz, Austria
21:00 CET	Horvath (yellow card) 74'	Report	Denkey (yellow card) 32' (yellow-red card) 45'; Diakité (yellow card) 35'; Delanghe (yellow card) 68'	Stadium: Raiffeisen Arena; Attendance: 8,500; Referee: Radoslav Gidzhenov (Bulgaria)

28 November 2024 4	Borac Banja Luka (Bosnia and Herzegovina)	2–1	(Austria) LASK	Banja Luka, Bosnia and Herzegovina
18:45 CET	Vukčević (yellow card) 3'; Meijers (yellow card) 51'; Despotović 82', (yellow card) 83'; Skorup 89'	Report	Siebenhandl (red card) 7'; Talovierov (yellow card) 16'; Flecker (yellow card) 43'; Berisha 51'; Bello (yellow card) 53'; Stojković (yellow card) 69'; Jungwirth (yellow card) 69'; Entrup (yellow card) 78'	Stadium: Banja Luka City Stadium; Attendance: 7,238; Referee: Gustavo Correia (Portugal)

12 December 2024 5	Fiorentina (Italy)	7–0	(Austria) LASK	Florence, Italy
18:45 CET	Sottil 10', 58'; Ikoné 22'; Richardson 39'; Mandragora 69'; Stojković 82' (o.g.); Guðmundsson 85' (pen.); Martínez Quarta (yellow card) 90+1'	Report	Jovičić (yellow card) 45+1'	Stadium: Stadio Artemio Franchi; Attendance: 9,211; Referee: Balázs Berke (Hungary)

19 December 2024 6	LASK (Austria)	1–1	(Iceland) Víkingur Reykjavík	Linz, Austria
21:00 CET	Ljubičić 26'; Bogarde (yellow card) 31'	Report	Ekroth (yellow card) 6'; Sigurpálsson 23' (pen.); Ibrahimagic (yellow card) 65'; Hansen (yellow card) 70'; Gunnarsson (yellow card) 71' (yellow-red card) 90'; Vilhjálmsson (yellow card) 88'	Stadium: Raiffeisen Arena; Attendance: 7,900; Referee: Mohammad Al-Emara (Finland)

== Statistics ==
=== Appearances and goals ===
As of match played 1 June 2025

List includes all first team players and any other matchday squad players.

No.	Pos	Nat	Player	Total		Bundesliga		Austrian Cup		Europa League		Conference League	
No.	Pos	Nat	Player	Apps	Goals	Apps	Goals	Apps	Goals	Apps	Goals	Apps	Goals
1	GK	(Austria) AUT	Tobias Lawal	24	0	21+0	0	3+0	0	0+0	0	0+0	0
2	DF	(United States) USA	George Bello	45	2	30+2	1	4+1	1	2+0	0	6+0	0
5	DF	(Austria) AUT	Philipp Ziereis	38	2	26+1	1	4+1	1	2+0	0	4+0	0
6	MF	(Netherlands) NED	Melayro Bogarde	38	1	17+10	1	2+1	0	2+0	0	5+1	0
7	FW	(United States) USA	Samuel Adeniran	19	2	6+11	1	1+1	1	0+0	0	0+0	0
8	FW	(Nigeria) NGR	Moses Usor	13	1	7+1	0	2+0	1	2+0	0	1+0	0
9	FW	(Czech Republic) CZE	Kryštof Daněk	18	1	12+5	1	1+0	0	0+0	0	0+0	0
10	MF	(Austria) AUT	Robert Žulj	41	13	25+5	9	3+1	4	1+0	0	6+0	0
11	FW	(Austria) AUT	Maximilian Entrup	38	13	24+5	12	3+0	1	0+0	0	3+3	0
14	MF	(Kosovo) KOS	Valon Berisha	31	6	17+4	3	2+1	1	2+0	0	5+0	2
15	MF	(Mali) MLI	Mohamed Sanogo	3	0	1+2	0	0+0	0	0+0	0	0+0	0
16	DF	(Panama) PAN	Andrés Andrade	11	2	10+0	2	1+0	0	0+0	0	0+0	0
17	DF	(Germany) GER	Jérôme Boateng	14	0	4+6	0	0+0	0	0+2	0	0+2	0
18	MF	(Serbia) SRB	Branko Jovičić	39	1	28+0	0	4+1	1	0+0	0	5+1	0
19	FW	(France) FRA	Lenny Pintor	12	0	1+8	0	0+1	0	0+2	0	0+0	0
21	MF	(Austria) AUT	Ivan Ljubic	17	1	12+3	1	2+0	0	0+0	0	0+0	0
22	DF	(Montenegro) MNE	Filip Stojković	24	0	11+2	0	3+0	0	1+1	0	5+1	0
23	FW	(Ghana) GHA	Ibrahim Mustapha	9	1	0+7	1	0+2	0	0+0	0	0+0	0
25	FW	(France) FRA	Alexis Tibidi	8	0	1+3	0	0+2	0	0+2	0	0+0	0
26	DF	(Croatia) CRO	Hrvoje Smolčić	34	3	21+4	3	3+0	0	1+0	0	4+1	0
27	FW	(Austria) AUT	Christoph Lang	19	3	9+9	3	1+0	0	0+0	0	0+0	0
29	FW	(Austria) AUT	Florian Flecker	28	4	14+6	3	1+1	0	0+0	0	3+3	1
30	MF	(Austria) AUT	Sascha Horvath	42	2	28+2	2	5+0	0	2+0	0	3+2	0
32	MF	(Mali) MLI	Ismaila Coulibaly	15	2	11+2	2	1+1	0	0+0	0	0+0	0
33	GK	(Austria) AUT	Tobias Schützenauer	2	0	2+0	0	0+0	0	0+0	0	0+0	0
35	DF	(Austria) AUT	Marco Sulzner	9	0	3+4	0	0+2	0	0+0	0	0+0	0
36	GK	(Austria) AUT	Lukas Jungwirth	6	0	2+1	0	0+0	0	0+0	0	2+1	0
38	MF	(Austria) AUT	Armin Haider	1	0	0+1	0	0+0	0	0+0	0	0+0	0
40	FW	(Canada) CAN	Naël Mamadou Lamine Kane	1	0	1+0	0	0+0	0	0+0	0	0+0	0
41	DF	(Nigeria) NGR	Emmanuel Michael	1	0	0+1	0	0+0	0	0+0	0	0+0	0
42	FW	(Austria) AUT	Kevin Lebersorger	2	0	0+1	0	0+1	0	0+0	0	0+0	0
44	FW	(France) FRA	Adil Taoui	20	3	2+10	1	2+0	1	2+0	1	1+3	0
45	MF	(Turkey) TUR	Enis Safin	5	0	2+1	0	1+1	0	0+0	0	0+0	0
46	DF	(Austria) AUT	Armin Midzic	2	0	0+1	0	0+0	0	0+0	0	1+0	0
47	FW	(France) FRA	Queyrell Tchicamboud	1	0	0+1	0	0+0	0	0+0	0	0+0	0
48	DF	(Senegal) SEN	Modou Kéba Cissé	15	1	9+4	1	0+2	0	0+0	0	0+0	0
49	FW	(Canada) CAN	Oumar Diallo	1	0	0+1	0	0+0	0	0+0	0	0+0	0
Player(s) who featured but departed the club on loan during the season:
37	FW	(Germany) GER	Lucas Copado	1	0	0+0	0	0+1	0	0+0	0	0+0	0
Player(s) who featured whilst on loan but returned to parent club during the season:
3	DF	(Finland) FIN	Tomas Galvez	4	0	1+2	0	1+0	0	0+0	0	0+0	0
Player(s) who featured but departed the club permanently during the season:
4	DF	(Ukraine) UKR	Maksym Talovierov	20	0	4+8	0	2+0	0	1+0	0	4+1	0
7	MF	(Austria) AUT	Rene Renner	4	0	1+1	0	0+1	0	0+0	0	0+1	0
9	FW	(Croatia) CRO	Marin Ljubičić	26	5	11+5	4	2+0	0	2+0	0	4+2	1
20	DF	(Portugal) POR	Tomás Tavares	4	0	1+2	0	0+1	0	0+0	0	0+0	0
28	GK	(Austria) AUT	Jörg Siebenhandl	20	0	10+1	0	3+0	0	2+0	0	4+0	0
