= Naël Kane =

Canadian soccer player

Personal information
- Full name: Naël Mamadou Lamine Kane
- Date of birth: April 12, 2006 (age 20)
- Place of birth: Ottawa, Ontario, Canada
- Height: 1.90 m (6 ft 3 in)
- Position: Winger

Team information
- Current team: LASK

Youth career
- West Ottawa SC
- 2023–2024: CF Montréal

Senior career*
Years	Team	Apps	(Gls)
2024	CF Montréal U23	17	(4)
2025–	LASK II	44	(9)
2025–	LASK	5	(0)
- * Club domestic league appearances and goals as of October 17, 2026

Naël Mamadou Lamine Kane (born April 12, 2006) is a Canadian professional soccer player who plays for Austrian Bundesliga club LASK.

== Early life ==
Kane was born in Ottawa, Ontario to a Senegalese father and a Burkinabé mother. Kane played youth soccer with West Ottawa SC, before joining the CF Montréal Academy in 2023.

== Club career ==
In 2024, Kane began playing with CF Montréal U23 in Ligue1 Québec.

In January 2025, he joined LASK Amateure OÖ (the second team of LASK) in the third tier Austrian Regionalliga. On May 23, 2025, he made his debut for the first team in the Austrian Bundesliga against SC Rheindorf Altach. On September 5, 2026, he scored a brace for the first team in a 6-1 victory over third tier side Deutschlandsberg in the second round of the 2026–27 Austrian Cup.

== Career statistics ==
As of October 17, 2026

Club	Season	League			National cup		League Cup		Continental		Other		Total	
Club	Season	Division	Apps	Goals	Apps	Goals	Apps	Goals	Apps	Goals	Apps	Goals	Apps	Goals
CF Montréal U23	2024	Ligue1 Québec	17	4	–		2	0	–		–		19	4
LASK Amateure OÖ	2024–25	Austrian Regionalliga Mitte	13	4	–		–		–		–		13	4
LASK Amateure OÖ	2025–26	Austrian Regionalliga Mitte	26	3	–		–		–		–		26	3
LASK Amateure OÖ	2026–27	Austrian Regionalliga Nord	5	2	–		–		–		–		5	2
LASK Amateure OÖ	Total		44	9	0	0	–		–		0	0	44	9
LASK	2024–25	Austrian Bundesliga	1	0	0	0	–		–		–		1	0
LASK	2026–27	Austrian Bundesliga	5	0	1	2	–		1 (Note: Appearances in UEFA Champions League)	0	–		7	2
LASK	Total		6	0	1	2	–		1	0	0	0	8	2
Career total			67	13	1	2	2	0	1	0	0	0	71	15
