= Sascha Horvath =

Austrian footballer (born 1996)

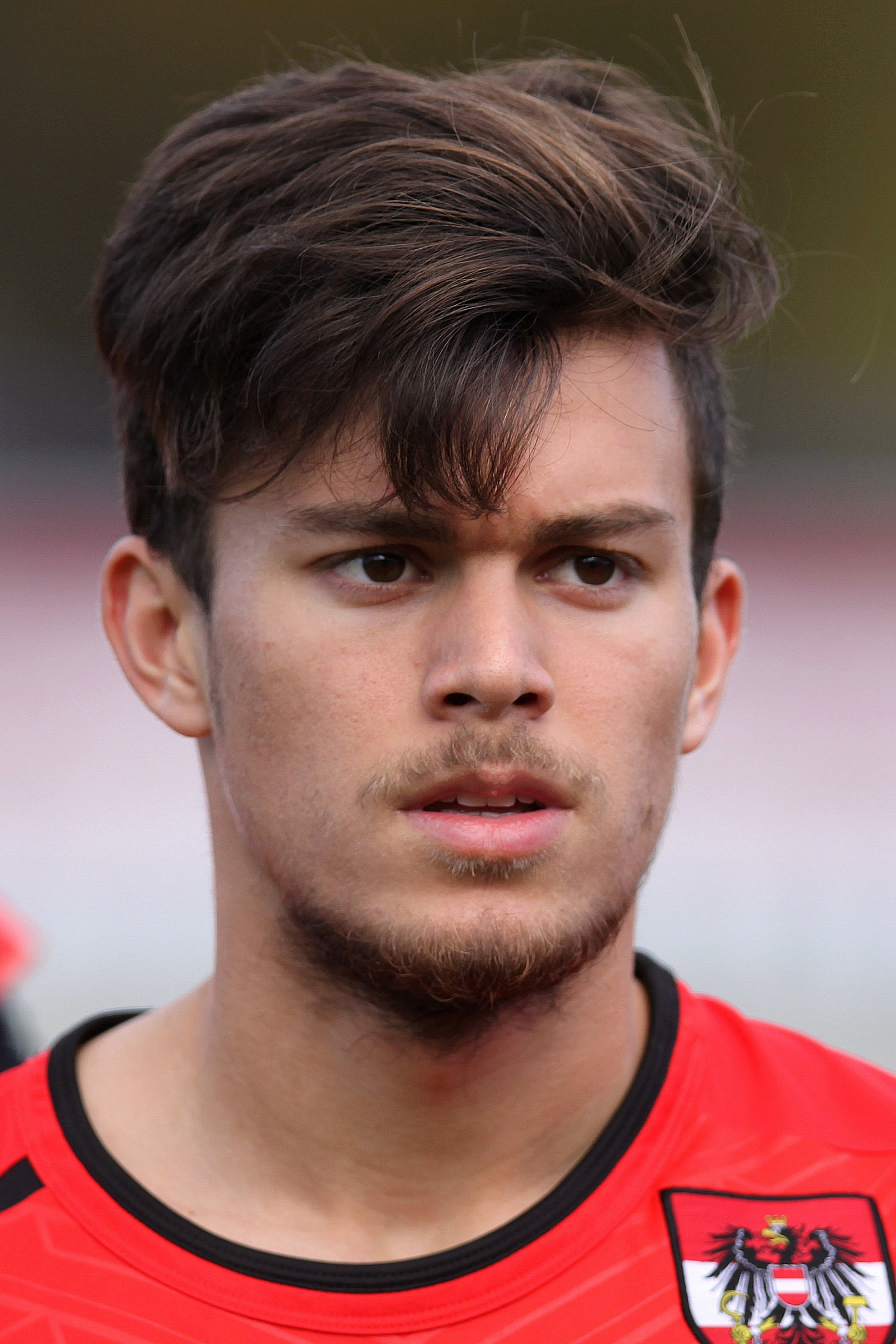
- Horvath with Austria U21 in 2015

Personal information
- Date of birth: 22 August 1996 (age 30)
- Place of birth: Vienna, Austria
- Height: 1.65 m (5 ft 5 in)
- Position: Midfielder

Team information
- Current team: LASK
- Number: 30

Youth career
- 2003–2005: SV Schwechat
- 2005–2012: Austria Wien

Senior career*
Years	Team	Apps	(Gls)
2012–2015	Austria Wien	14	(0)
2015–2017	Sturm Graz	48	(4)
2017–2020	Dynamo Dresden	44	(2)
2019	→ Wacker Innsbruck (loan)	14	(0)
2020–2021	TSV Hartberg	31	(5)
2021–	LASK	150	(15)

International career^{‡}
2011	Austria U16	3	(1)
2012–2013	Austria U17	21	(4)
2014–2015	Austria U19	17	(3)
2015–2019	Austria U21	18	(1)
2026–	Austria	3	(0)
- * Club domestic league appearances and goals as of 31 October 2026 ‡ National team caps and goals as of 17 November 2026

Sascha Horvath (born 22 August 1996) is an Austrian professional footballer who plays as a midfielder for Austrian Football Bundesliga club LASK and the Austria national team.

== Club career ==
Horvath is a youth exponent from Austria Wien. He made his Bundesliga debut at 3 November 2013 against SC Wiener Neustadt. He replaced Marin Leovac after 80 minutes.

On 3 June 2015, Horvath joined league rivals Sturm Graz.

On 30 August 2021, he signed a three-year contract with LASK.

== International career ==
Horvath was born in Austria and is of Hungarian descent. He is a former youth international for Austria.

In September 2026, Horvath was one of the players who were called up to the Austria national team by head coach Ralf Rangnick, for the 2026–27 UEFA Nations League B matches against Israel, Kosovo (twice) and Republic of Ireland on 24, 27 September, 1 and 4 October 2026.

== Career statistics ==
=== Club ===
As of match played 3 November 2026

Appearances and goals by club, season and competition
Club	Season	League			National cup (Note: Includes Austrian Cup, DFB-Pokal)		Europe		Other		Total	
Club	Season	Division	Apps	Goals	Apps	Goals	Apps	Goals	Apps	Goals	Apps	Goals
Austria Vienna II	2011–12	Regionalliga Ost	11	1	–		–		–		11	1
Austria Vienna II	2012–13	Regionalliga Ost	21	1	–		–		–		21	1
Austria Vienna II	2013–14	Regionalliga Ost	9	0	–		–		–		9	0
Austria Vienna II	2014–15	Regionalliga Ost	17	0	–		–		–		17	0
Austria Vienna II	Total		58	2	–		–		–		58	2
Austria Vienna	2013–14	Austrian; Bundesliga	12	0	0	0	0	0	–		12	0
Austria Vienna	2014–15	Austrian; Bundesliga	2	0	0	0	0	0	–		2	0
Austria Vienna	Total		14	0	0	0	0	0	–		14	0
Sturm Graz	2015–16	Austrian; Bundesliga	25	4	2	0	1 (Note: Appearance(s) in UEFA Europa League)	0	–		28	4
Sturm Graz	2016–17	Austrian; Bundesliga	23	0	1	0	0	0	–		24	0
Sturm Graz	Total		48	4	3	0	1	0	–		52	4
Dynamo Dresden	2017–18	2. Bundesliga	20	1	2	0	—		–		22	1
Dynamo Dresden	2018–19	2. Bundesliga	0	0	1	0	—		–		1	0
Dynamo Dresden	2019–20	2. Bundesliga	23	1	2	0	—		–		25	1
Dynamo Dresden	2020–21	3. Liga	1	0	1	0	—		–		2	0
Dynamo Dresden	Total		44	2	6	0	0	0	–		50	2
Wacker Innsbruck (loan)	2018–19	Austrian; Bundesliga	14	0	0	0	—		–		14	0
Hartberg	2020–21	Austrian Bundesliga	24	2	2	1	–		1 (Note: Appearance in Europa Conference League play-off)	0	27	3
Hartberg	2021–22	Austrian Bundesliga	6	3	1	1	—		–		7	4
Hartberg	Total		30	5	3	2	—		1	0	34	7
LASK	2021–22	Austrian Bundesliga	27	7	3	2	6 (Note: Appearances in UEFA Conference League)	2	—		37	11
LASK	2022–23	Austrian Bundesliga	31	2	5	0	—		–		36	2
LASK	2023–24	Austrian Bundesliga	24	1	3	1	7 (Note: Appearances in UEFA Europa League)	1	–		34	3
LASK	2024–25	Austrian Bundesliga	28	2	5	0	7 (Note: Two appearances in UEFA Europa League, five appearances in UEFA Conference League)	0	–		40	2
LASK	2025–26	Austrian Bundesliga	28	2	6	0	0	0	—		34	2
LASK	2026–27	Austrian Bundesliga	11	1	3	1	5 (Note: Appearances in UEFA Champions League)	0	—		19	2
LASK	Total		150	15	25	4	25	3	—		199	22
Career total			357	28	37	6	26	3	1	0	421	37

=== International ===
As of match played 17 November 2026

Appearances and goals by national team and year
National team	Year	Apps	Goals
Austria	2026	3	0
Total		3	0

== Honours ==
LASK

- Austrian Bundesliga: 2025–26
- Austrian Cup: 2025–26
