= Maximilian Entrup =

Austrian footballer (born 1997)

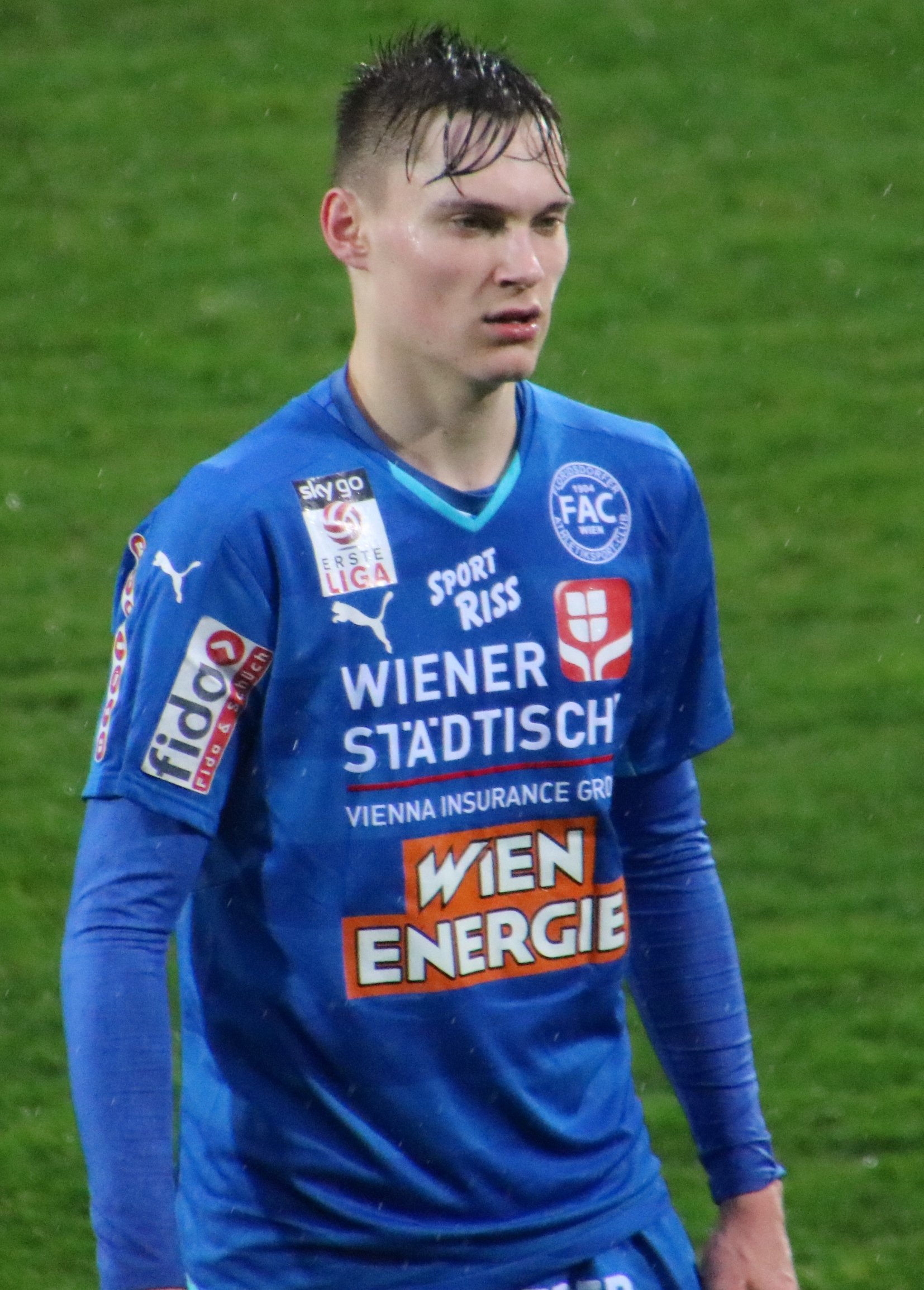
- Entrup in 2016

Personal information
- Date of birth: 25 July 1997 (age 29)
- Place of birth: Vienna, Austria
- Height: 1.86 m (6 ft 1 in)
- Position: Forward

Team information
- Current team: Eintracht Braunschweig
- Number: 9

Youth career
- –2006: SC Enzersfeld/W.
- 2006–2009: First Vienna
- 2009–2012: Austria Wien
- 2012–2015: Floridsdorfer AC

Senior career*
Years	Team	Apps	(Gls)
2015–2016	Floridsdorfer AC	18	(2)
2016–2018	Rapid Wien	2	(0)
2017–2018	→ St. Pölten (loan)	6	(0)
2018–2019	SV Lafnitz	29	(5)
2020–2022	FCM Traiskirchen	15	(8)
2022–2023	Marchfeld Donauauen	37	(31)
2023–2024	Hartberg	26	(13)
2024–2026	LASK	49	(13)
2026–	Eintracht Braunschweig	0	(0)

International career^{‡}
2016	Austria U19	1	(0)
2023–	Austria	3	(1)
- * Club domestic league appearances and goals as of 26 April 2026 ‡ National team caps and goals as of 4 June 2024

Maximilian Entrup (born 25 July 1997) is an Austrian professional footballer who plays as a forward for German 2. Bundesliga club Eintracht Braunschweig and the Austria national team.

== Club career ==
Entrup started his career at SC Enzersfeld/W.

On 3 July 2026, Entrup signed a two-year contract with Eintracht Braunschweig in German 2. Bundesliga.

== International career ==
On 7 November 2023, he got his first called up into the Austria senior national team.

== Career statistics ==
=== Club ===
As of match played 26 April 2026

Appearances and goals by club, season and competition
Club	Season	League			Austrian Cup		Europe		Total	
Club	Season	Division	Apps	Goals	Apps	Goals	Apps	Goals	Apps	Goals
Floridsdorfer AC	2015–16	Austrian 2. Liga	18	3	—		—		18	3
Rapid Wien	2016–17	Austrian Bundesliga	2	0	0	0	1 (Note: Appearances in UEFA Europa League)	0	3	0
Rapid Wien II	2016–17	Austrian Regionalliga East	2	0	—		—		2	0
St. Pölten (loan)	2017–18	Austrian Bundesliga	7	0	—		—		7	0
St. Pölten Juniors	2017–18	Austrian Regionalliga East	15	9	—		—		15	9
Lafnitz	2018–19	Austrian 2. Liga	21	4	0	0	—		21	4
Lafnitz	2019–20	Austrian 2. Liga	8	1	1	0	—		9	1
Lafnitz	Total		29	5	1	0	—		30	5
Laftniz II	2018–19	Landesliga	1	5	—		—		1	5
FCM Traiskirchen	2019–20	Austrian Regionalliga East	2	0	—		—		2	0
FCM Traiskirchen	2021–22	Austrian Regionalliga East	13	8	1	0	—		14	8
FCM Traiskirchen	Total		15	8	1	0	—		16	8
FC Marchfeld Donauauen	2021–22	Austrian Regionalliga East	10	10	0	0	—		10	10
FC Marchfeld Donauauen	2022–23	Austrian Regionalliga East	27	21	1	1	—		28	22
FC Marchfeld Donauauen	Total		37	31	1	1	—		38	32
Hartberg	2023–24	Austrian Bundesliga	26	13	2	3	—		28	16
Hartberg	2024–25	Austrian Bundesliga	0	0	0	0	—		0	0
Hartberg	Total		26	13	2	3	—		28	16
LASK	2024–25	Austrian Bundesliga	26	12	2	1	6 (Note: Appearances in UEFA Conference League)	0	34	13
LASK	2025–26	Austrian Bundesliga	23	1	1	0	—		24	1
LASK	Total		49	13	3	1	6	0	58	14
Career total			201	87	8	5	7	0	217	92

=== International ===
As of match played 4 June 2024

Appearances and goals by national team and year
National team	Year	Apps	Goals
Austria	2023	1	0
Austria	2024	2	1
Total		3	1

Scores and results list Austria's goal tally first, score column indicates score after each Entrup goal.

List of international goals scored by Maximilian Entrup
No.	Date	Venue	Opponent	Score	Result	Competition
1	26 March 2024	Ernst-Happel-Stadion, Vienna, Austria	Turkey	6–1	6–1	Friendly

== Honours ==
LASK

- Austrian Bundesliga: 2025–26
- Austrian Cup: 2025–26
