= Modou Kéba Cissé =

Senegalese footballer (born 2005)

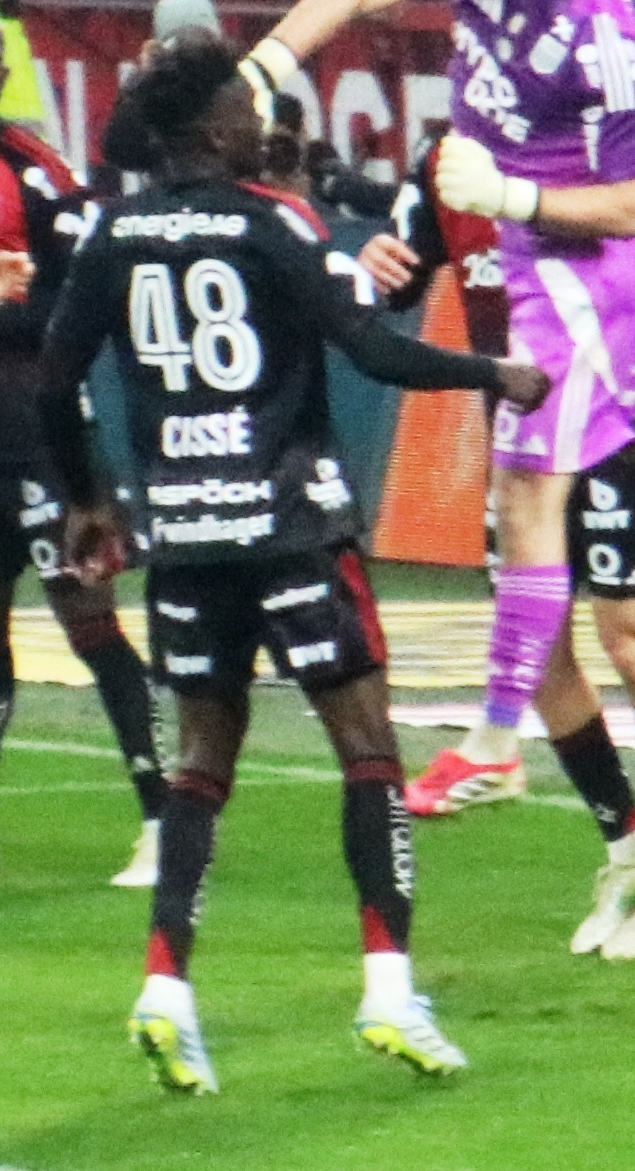
- Cissé with LASK in 2026

Personal information
- Full name: Modou Kéba Cissé
- Date of birth: 4 August 2005 (age 21)
- Place of birth: Dakar, Senegal
- Height: 6 ft 3 in (1.91 m)
- Position: Defender

Team information
- Current team: Aston Villa
- Number: 48

Youth career
- –2024: Be Sport Academy
- 2024: Real Ávila
- 2024–2025: LASK

Senior career*
Years	Team	Apps	(Gls)
2025	LASK Amateur OÖ	5	(0)
2025–2026	LASK	36	(3)
2026–	Aston Villa	0	(0)
- * Club domestic league appearances and goals as of 19:02, 10 May 2026 (UTC)

Modou Kéba Cissé (born 4 August 2005) is a Senegalese professional footballer who plays as a centre-back or defensive midfielder for Premier League club Aston Villa.

Cissé is a product of the Be Sport Academy in Dakar, Senegal, which was followed by a short spell at Real Avila before signing for Austrian side LASK in 2024. Cissé signed a pre-agreement with Aston Villa in July 2025 and completed the move a year later having played a key role LASK's league and cup double.

== Club career ==
=== Early career ===
Cissé played his early football at the Senegalese Be Sport Academy, before signing for Spanish club Real Ávila's youth system in February 2024.

=== LASK ===
Cissé was in Spain for only 4 months before, on 14 July 2024, he was signed by Austrian Football Bundesliga club LASK.

Cissé played 5 matches for the club's B-team in the Austrian Regionalliga, before being moved to the first team. He made his professional debut on 23 February 2025, in a 2–1 league victory over Rapid Vienna.

On 19 July 2025, English club Aston Villa announced that they had come to an agreement for the signing of Cissé in the summer of 2026, with the defender remaining at the Austrian club until then. It was reported that the transfer fee was around £4 million. Cissé trained with the Aston Villa side during the Austrian league's winter break in December 2025. LASK won the league and cup with Cissé appearing 30 times over the season.

=== Aston Villa ===
Cissé joined Aston Villa in July 2026 as per the terms of the contract agreed one year prior.

== Personal life ==
Cissé's mother was a Spanish teacher and his father a local businessman. He is a practicing Muslim.

== Career statistics ==
As of match played 10 May 2026

Appearances and goals by club, season and competition
Club	Season	League			National cup (Note: Includes Austrian Cup)		League cup		Europe		Other		Total	
Club	Season	Division	Apps	Goals	Apps	Goals	Apps	Goals	Apps	Goals	Apps	Goals	Apps	Goals
LASK Amateur OÖ	2024–25	Austrian Regionalliga	5	0	0	0	—		—		—		5	0
LASK	2024–25	Austrian Bundesliga	10	1	2	0	—		—		3 (Note: Appearances in Austrian Bundesliga UEFA Conference League play-offs)	0	15	1
LASK	2025–26	Austrian Bundesliga	26	2	4	1	—		—		—		30	3
LASK	Total		36	3	6	1	—		—		3	0	45	4
Aston Villa	2026–27	Premier League	0	0	0	0	0	0	0	0	0	0	0	0
Career total			41	3	6	1	0	0	0	0	3	0	50	4

== Honours ==
LASK

- Austrian Bundesliga: 2025–26
- Austrian Cup: 2025–26
