= Melayro Bogarde =

Surinamese footballer (born 2002)

Personal information
- Full name: Melayro Chakewno Jalaino Bogarde
- Date of birth: 28 May 2002 (age 24)
- Place of birth: Rotterdam, Netherlands
- Height: 1.82 m (6 ft 0 in)
- Position: Centre-back

Team information
- Current team: LASK
- Number: 6

Youth career
- –2009: RVV Swift Boys
- 2009–2018: Feyenoord
- 2018–2020: TSG Hoffenheim

Senior career*
Years	Team	Apps	(Gls)
2020–2023	TSG Hoffenheim	11	(0)
2020–2024	TSG Hoffenheim II	52	(3)
2022	→ Groningen (loan)	7	(0)
2022–2023	→ PEC Zwolle (loan)	10	(0)
2024–	LASK	65	(4)

International career^{‡}
2017	Netherlands U15	3	(1)
2017–2018	Netherlands U16	4	(1)
2018–2019	Netherlands U17	17	(0)
2019	Netherlands U18	3	(1)
2021	Netherlands U21	3	(0)
2026–	Suriname	1	(0)
Medal record
Representing Netherlands
UEFA European Under-17 Championship
Winner	Ireland 2019	U-17 Team
- * Club domestic league appearances and goals as of 31 October 2026 ‡ National team caps and goals as of 26 March 2026

Melayro Chakewno Jalaino Bogarde (born 28 May 2002) is a professional footballer who plays as a centre-back for Austrian Bundesliga club LASK. Born in the Netherlands, he represents the Suriname national team.

== Club career ==
Bogarde joined the youth team of TSG Hoffenheim from the Feyenoord Academy in 2018. On 30 May 2020, he made his professional debut for Hoffenheim in the Bundesliga, starting in the away match against Mainz 05.

On 14 January 2022, Bogarde was loaned to Eredivisie club Groningen for the rest of the season.

On 1 July 2024, Bogarde was signed by LASK.

== International career ==
=== Youth ===
Bogarde began his international career with the Netherlands under-15 national team in 2017, before playing for the under-16 team until 2018. In 2019, he was included in the Dutch squad for the 2019 UEFA European Under-17 Championship in the Republic of Ireland. The Netherlands won the tournament, defeating Italy 4–2 in the final, with Bogarde appearing in all six matches and later selected by the UEFA technical observers for the team of the tournament. As a result, the Netherlands under-17 team qualified for the 2019 FIFA U-17 World Cup in Brazil later that year. Bogarde was included in the Dutch squad for the tournament, in which he made three appearances as the Netherlands finished fourth.

=== Senior ===
In March 2026, Bogarde was called up to represent Suriname internationally. On 26 March, he made his first senior international start in a 2–1 loss to Bolivia during the World Cup qualifying inter-confederation playoffs.

== Personal life ==
Bogarde was born in Rotterdam, and is of Surinamese descent. His uncle, Winston Bogarde, is a former footballer who was capped for the Netherlands, while his younger brother Lamare is an Aston Villa player and Dutch youth international.

== Career statistics ==
=== Club ===
As of match played 3 November 2026

Appearances and goals by club, season and competition
Club	Season	League			National cup (Note: Includes DFB-Pokal, KNVB Cup, Austrian Cup)		Europe		Total	
Club	Season	Division	Apps	Goals	Apps	Goals	Apps	Goals	Apps	Goals
1899 Hoffenheim	2019–20	Bundesliga	2	0	0	0	0	0	2	0
1899 Hoffenheim	2020–21	Bundesliga	9	0	1	0	4 (Note: Appearances in UEFA Europa League)	0	14	0
1899 Hoffenheim	2021–22	Bundesliga	0	0	1	0	0	0	1	0
1899 Hoffenheim	2022–23	Bundesliga	0	0	0	0	—		0	0
1899 Hoffenheim	Total		11	0	2	0	4	0	17	0
1899 Hoffenheim II	2020–21	Regionalliga Südwest	9	0	—		—		9	0
1899 Hoffenheim II	2021–22	Regionalliga Südwest	17	0	—		—		17	0
1899 Hoffenheim II	2022–23	Regionalliga Südwest	1	0	—		—		1	0
1899 Hoffenheim II	2023–24	Regionalliga Südwest	25	3	—		—		25	3
1899 Hoffenheim II	Total		52	3	—		—		52	3
Groningen (loan)	2021–22	Eredivisie	7	0	1	0	—		8	0
PEC Zwolle (loan)	2022–23	Eerste Divisie	10	0	2	0	—		12	0
LASK	2024–25	Austrian Bundesliga	27	2	3	0	8 (Note: Two appearances in UEFA Europa League, six appearances in UEFA Conference League)	0	38	2
LASK	2025–26	Austrian Bundesliga	27	1	6	0	0	0	33	1
LASK	2026–27	Austrian Bundesliga	11	1	1	0	4 (Note: Appearances in UEFA Champions League)	0	16	1
LASK	Total		65	4	10	0	12	0	87	4
Career total			155	7	15	0	16	0	186	7

=== International ===
As of match played 26 March 2026

Appearances and goals by national team and year
National team	Year	Apps	Goals
Suriname	2026	1	0
Total		1	0

== Honours ==
LASK

- Austrian Bundesliga: 2025–26
- Austrian Cup: 2025–26

Netherlands U17

- UEFA European Under-17 Championship: 2019

Individual

- UEFA European Under-17 Championship Team of the Tournament: 2019
