= Florian Flecker =

Austrian footballer (born 1995)

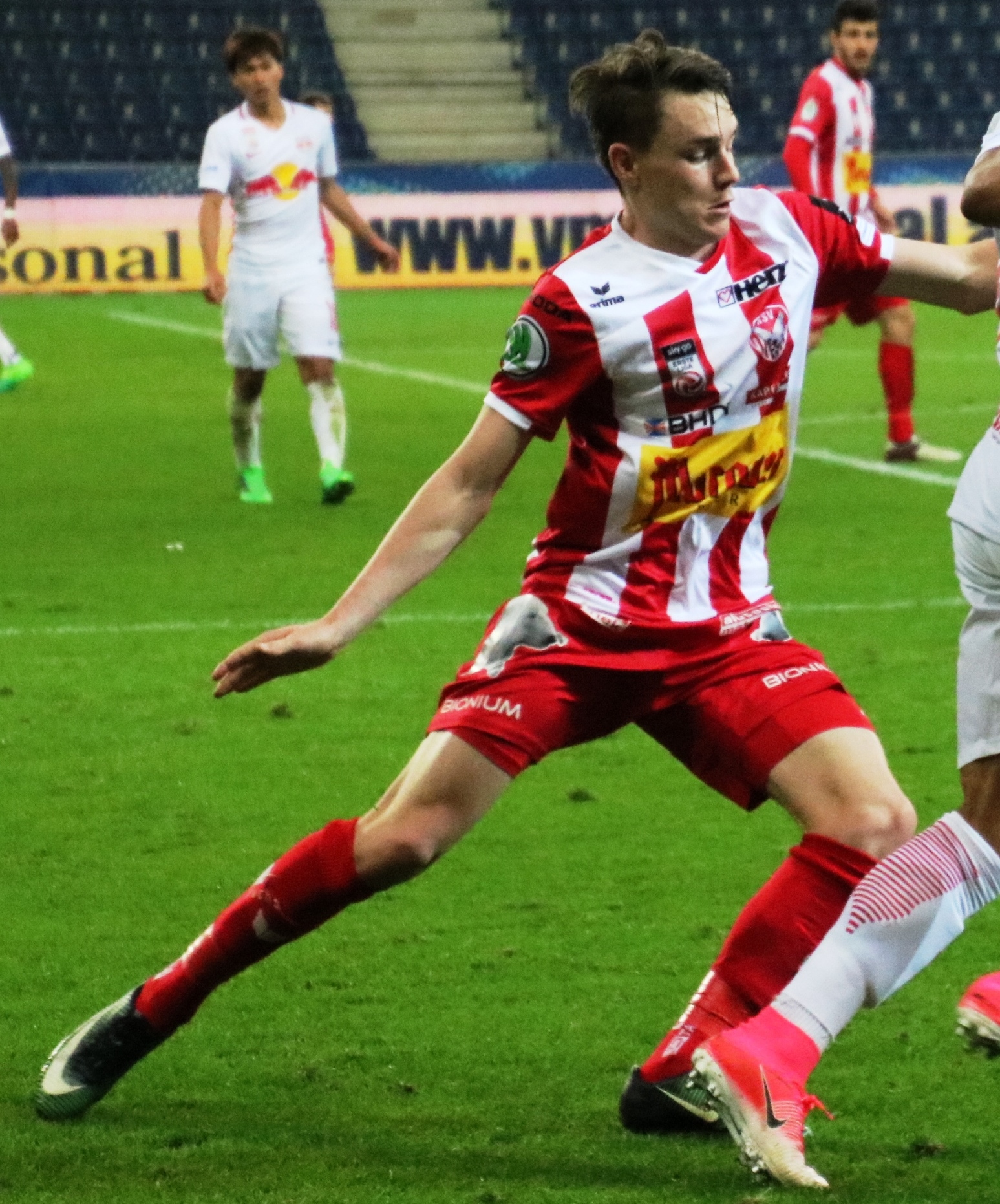
- Flecker with Kapfenberger SV in 2017

Personal information
- Date of birth: 29 October 1995 (age 31)
- Place of birth: Voitsberg, Austria
- Height: 1.77 m (5 ft 10 in)
- Position: Right winger

Team information
- Current team: LASK
- Number: 29

Youth career
- 2002–2010: SVU Murau
- 2010–2014: Kapfenberger SV

Senior career*
Years	Team	Apps	(Gls)
2014–2017	Kapfenberger SV II	34	(9)
2015–2017	Kapfenberger SV	66	(10)
2017–2018	Wolfsberger AC	31	(1)
2018–2019	Hartberg	32	(7)
2019–2020	Union Berlin	0	(0)
2020–2021	Würzburger Kickers	9	(0)
2021	Hartberg	15	(3)
2021–	LASK	131	(10)
- * Club domestic league appearances and goals as of 31 October 2026

Florian Flecker (born 29 October 1995) is an Austrian professional footballer who plays as a right winger for Austrian Bundesliga club LASK.

== Career ==
=== Early career ===
Flecker began his career at SVU Murau. In 2010, he moved to the youth department of Kapfenberger SV. From the season 2012–13, he played for the club's third team, ASC Rapid Kapfenberg, in the fifth-tier Oberliga. In August 2014, he made his debut for Kapfenberg's second team in the fourth-tier Landesliga Steiermark, when he was in the starting eleven on the first matchday of the 2014–15 season against SV Anger. In October 2014, he scored his first goal in the fourth tier in a 3–0 win over ASK Voitsberg. In May 2015, he was included in the first-team squad of Kapfenberg for the first time for a match against SC Austria Lustenau, but he did not make an appearance.

In July 2015, Flecker made his debut in the 2. Liga, when he came on as a substitute in the 81st minute of the 2015–16 season against Lustenau for João Victor. In August 2015, he was in the starting lineup for the first time for the first team in the match against SKN St. Pölten, being before replaced by Gerald Nutz at halftime. In March 2016, he scored his first goal in the second tier in a 2–1 win over FC Liefering. In his first season as a professional, he made 31 league appearances, scoring three goals. In the following season – 2016–17 – he played in 35 games and scored seven goals.

=== Austrian Bundesliga ===
In May 2017, Flecker joined Austrian Bundesliga club Wolfsberger AC, where he signed a two-year contract. In July, he made his debut for the Carinthians in the Bundesliga, when he came on as a substitute in the 70th minute for Mario Leitgeb in the first matchday of that season against Red Bull Salzburg in the 70th minute. In the following match, Wolfsberger AC faced SV Mattersburg with Flecker in the starting lineup for the first time. He scored his only goal in the Bundesliga for WAC in a 5–1 loss to Mattersburg in December 2017. In his first season in the Bundesliga, he made 31 appearances.

On 2 July 2018, despite an ongoing contract with WAC, he moved to recently promoted TSV Hartberg on a free transfer. He signed a one-year contract. He scored his first goal for Hartberg on 11 August 2018; again against Mattersburg. For Hartberg, he played in all 32 games during his sole season at the club, scoring seven goals. He was able to help sustain Hartberg in the Bundesliga for the following season.

=== In Germany ===
After the expiry of his contract with Hartberg, Flecker moved to recently promoted German Bundesliga club Union Berlin ahead of the 2019–20 season, signing a two-year contract. In his season at the capital club, he hardly played a role and ended up with no appearances; during the entire season, he only appeared in the matchday squad six times. For the 2020–21 season, he joined Würzburger Kickers in the 2. Bundesliga, where he signed a two-year contract.

== Career statistics ==
As of match played 31 October 2026

Appearances and goals by club, season and competition
Club	Season	League			National cup (Note: Includes Austrian Cup, DFB-Pokal)		Europe		Total	
Club	Season	Division	Apps	Goals	Apps	Goals	Apps	Goals	Apps	Goals
Kapfenberger SV	2015–16	Austrian Football Second League	31	3	2	0	—		33	3
Kapfenberger SV	2016–17	Austrian Football Second League	35	7	4	1	—		39	8
Kapfenberger SV	Total		66	10	6	1	—		72	11
Wolfsberger AC	2017–18	Austrian Bundesliga	31	1	3	0	—		34	1
Hartberg	2018–19	Austrian Bundesliga	32	7	3	0	—		35	7
Union Berlin	2019–20	Bundesliga	0	0	0	0	—		0	0
Würzburger Kickers	2019–20	3. Liga	0	0	2	0	—		2	0
Würzburger Kickers	2020–21	2. Bundesliga	9	0	1	0	—		10	0
Würzburger Kickers	Total		9	0	3	0	—		12	0
Hartberg	2020–21	Austrian Bundesliga	15	3	—		—		15	3
LASK	2021–22	Austrian Bundesliga	30	3	3	1	10 (Note: Appearances in UEFA Conference League)	0	43	4
LASK	2022–23	Austrian Bundesliga	26	2	4	1	—		30	3
LASK	2023–24	Austrian Bundesliga	29	1	4	0	8 (Note: Appearances in UEFA Europa League)	1	41	2
LASK	2024–25	Austrian Bundesliga	17	3	2	0	5	0	24	3
LASK	2025–26	Austrian Bundesliga	20	0	5	0	—		25	0
LASK	2026–27	Austrian Bundesliga	9	1	2	1	4 (Note: Appearances in UEFA Champions League)	3	15	5
LASK	Total		131	10	20	3	27	4	178	17
Career total			284	31	35	4	27	4	346	39

== Honours ==
LASK

- Austrian Bundesliga: 2025–26
- Austrian Cup: 2025–26
