= Adil Taoui =

French footballer (born 2001)

Personal information
- Date of birth: 10 August 2001 (age 25)
- Place of birth: Limoges, France
- Height: 1.79 m (5 ft 10 in)
- Positions: Attacking midfielder; winger

Team information
- Current team: Lokomotiv Sofia
- Number: 11

Youth career
- 2008–2009: SL Val
- 2009–2014: JA Isle
- 2014–2017: Limoges
- 2017–2020: Toulouse

Senior career*
Years	Team	Apps	(Gls)
2018–2021	Toulouse II	20	(5)
2020–2021	Toulouse	3	(0)
2021–2022	Bastia	12	(0)
2022–2025	LASK II	2	(1)
2023–2025	LASK	26	(2)
2026–	Lokomotiv Sofia	11	(4)

International career
2016–2017	France U16	8	(3)
2019	France U18	3	(1)
- * Club domestic league appearances and goals as of 11 June 2026

Adil Taoui (born 10 August 2001) is a French professional footballer who plays as an attacking midfielder or winger for Bulgarian First League club Lokomotiv Sofia.

== Club career ==
Taoui made his professional debut in a 1–0 Ligue 1 loss to Strasbourg on 5 February 2020. On 14 July 2021, he signed for Ligue 2 club Bastia.

== International career ==
Born in France, Taoui is of Algerian descent and has dual nationality. He is a youth international for France.

== Career statistics ==
As of match played 7 December 2024

Appearances and goals by club, season and competition
Club	Season	League			National Cup		Europe		Other		Total	
Club	Season	Division	Apps	Goals	Apps	Goals	Apps	Goals	Apps	Goals	Apps	Goals
Toulouse II	2018–19	Championnat National 3	10	2	—		—		—		10	2
Toulouse II	2019–20	Championnat National 3	10	3	—		—		—		10	3
Toulouse II	Total		20	5	—		—		—		20	5
Toulouse	2019–20	Ligue 1	2	0	0	0	—		0	0	2	0
Toulouse	2020–21	Ligue 2	1	0	0	0	—		—		1	0
Toulouse	Total		3	0	0	0	—		0	0	3	0
Bastia	2021–22	Ligue 2	12	0	3	0	—		—		15	0
LASK	2022–23	Austrian Bundesliga	4	0	0	0	—		—		4	0
LASK	2023–24	Austrian Bundesliga	10	1	0	0	—		—		10	1
LASK	2024–25	Austrian Bundesliga	12	1	2	1	5 (Note: Two appearances and one goal in UEFA Europa League, three appearances in UEFA Conference League)	1	—		19	3
LASK	Total		26	2	2	1	5	1	—		33	4
LASK II	2022–23	Austrian Regionalliga Central	2	1	—		—		—		2	1
Career total			62	8	5	1	5	1	0	0	72	10
