= Lukas Jungwirth =

Austrian footballer (born 2004)

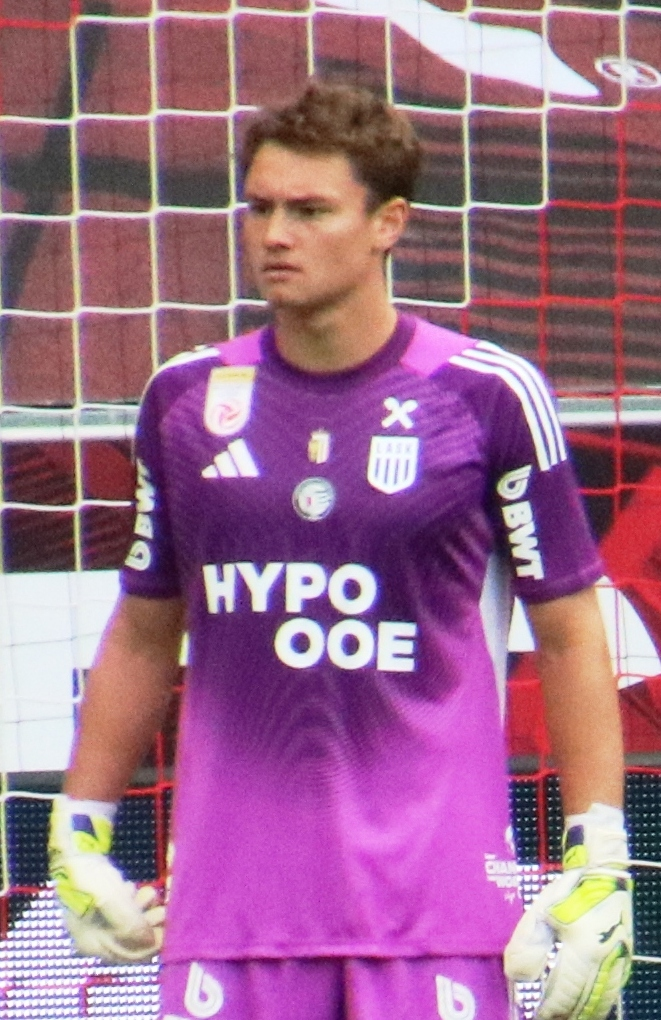
- Jungwirth in 2025

Personal information
- Date of birth: 30 April 2004 (age 22)
- Place of birth: Linz, Austria
- Height: 1.93 m (6 ft 4 in)
- Position: Goalkeeper

Team information
- Current team: LASK
- Number: 1

Youth career
- 2012–2015: TSU Wartberg/Aist
- 2015–2020: LASK

Senior career*
Years	Team	Apps	(Gls)
2020–2024	FC Juniors OÖ	51	(0)
2023–	LASK	45	(0)
2024–2025	→ Admira Wacker (loan)	6	(0)

International career^{‡}
2018–2019	Austria U15	2	(0)
2019–2020	Austria U16	3	(0)
2024–	Austria U18	2	(0)
2025–	Austria U21	9	(0)
2026–	Austria	1	(0)
- * Club domestic league appearances and goals as of 21:30, 31 October 2026 (UTC) ‡ National team caps and goals as of 17 November 2026

Lukas Jungwirth (born 30 April 2004) is an Austrian professional footballer who plays as a goalkeeper for Austrian Football Bundesliga club LASK and the Austria national team.

== Club career ==
Jungwirth is a product of the youth academies of the Austrian clubs TSU Wartberg/Aist and LASK. In 2020, he was promoted to LASK's reserve side FC Juniors OÖ in the 2. Liga. On 24 June 2021, he signed his first professional contract with LASK until 2024. In January 2023 he was promoted to LASK's senior aside, and on 16 May 2023 he extended his contract with LASK until 2026. On 24 June 2024, he was loaned to Admira Wacker for a season on a cooperation basis. On 20 October 2024, he debuted with the senior LASK team in a 2–1 Austrian Football Bundesliga win over WSG Tirol.

On 28 January 2025, Jungwirth's loan was cut short with Admira Wacker, and he rejoined LASK's first team. On 9 July 2025, he extended his contract with LASK until 2029 and was named the starting goalkeeper for the club.

== International career ==
Jungwirth is a youth international for Austria. He was called up to the Austria U21s for a set of friendlies in October 2024.

In September 2026, Jungwirth was one of the players who were called up to the Austria national team by head coach Ralf Rangnick, for the 2026–27 UEFA Nations League B matches against Israel, Kosovo (twice) and Republic of Ireland on 24, 27 September, 1 and 4 October 2026.

== Career statistics ==
As of match played 3 November 2026

Appearances and goals by club, season and competition
Club	Season	League			Austrian Cup		Europe		Total	
Club	Season	Division	Apps	Goals	Apps	Goals	Apps	Goals	Apps	Goals
FC Juniors OÖ	2019–20	2. Liga	1	0	—		—		1	0
FC Juniors OÖ	2020–21	2. Liga	1	0	—		—		1	0
FC Juniors OÖ	2021–22	2. Liga	11	0	—		—		11	0
FC Juniors OÖ	2022–23	2. Liga	20	0	—		—		20	0
FC Juniors OÖ	2023–24	2. Liga	18	0	—		—		18	0
FC Juniors OÖ	Total		51	0	—		—		51	0
LASK	2023–24	Austrian Bundesliga	0	0	0	0	0	0	0	0
LASK	2024–25	Austrian Bundesliga	3	0	0	0	3 (Note: Appearances in UEFA Conference League)	0	6	0
LASK	2025–26	Austrian Bundesliga	31	0	6	0	—		37	0
LASK	2026–27	Austrian Bundesliga	11	0	2	0	6 (Note: Appearances in UEFA Champions League)	0	19	0
LASK	Total		45	0	8	0	9	0	62	0
Admira Wacker (loan)	2024–25	2. Liga	6	0	—		—		6	0
Career total			102	0	8	0	9	0	119	0

=== International ===
As of match played 17 November 2026

Appearances and goals by national team and year
National team	Year	Apps	Goals
Austria	2026	1	0
Total		1	0

== Honours ==
LASK

- Austrian Bundesliga: 2025–26
- Austrian Cup: 2025–26
