= Alemão (footballer, born November 2002) =

Brazilian footballer (born 2002)

Personal information
- Full name: João Victor Tornich
- Date of birth: 6 November 2002 (age 24)
- Place of birth: Franca, Brazil
- Height: 1.94 m (6 ft 4 in)
- Position: Centre-back

Team information
- Current team: LASK (on loan from Portimonense)
- Number: 43

Youth career
- 2017–2020: Francana
- 2020–2023: Corinthians

Senior career*
Years	Team	Apps	(Gls)
2023–2026	Portimonense	55	(2)
2025–2026	→ LASK (loan)	23	(1)
2026–	LASK	11	(0)
- * Club domestic league appearances and goals as of 31 October 2026

João Victor Tornich (born 6 November 2002), better known by his nickname Alemão, is a Brazilian professional footballer who plays as a centre-back for Austrian Bundesliga club LASK.

== Career ==
Alemão began his career at Francana in his hometown. As part of a partnership with Corinthians of São Paulo, he joined them in 2020. In January 2023, he moved to Portugal to join first division club Portimonense. Corinthians retained 40% of the economic rights to the player, where Francana also retained an undisclosed amount. He made his Primeira Liga debut in April 2023 against Gil Vicente. He played five games in the top division until the end of the 2022–23 season. In the 2023/24 season, he made 27 appearances in the Primeira Liga, from which Portimonense were relegated at the end of the season. In the 2024–25 season, he made 23 appearances in the Liga Portugal 2.

In August 2025, Alemão was loaned to Austrian Bundesliga club LASK.

== Career statistics ==
As of match played 3 November 2026

Appearances and goals by club, season and competition
Club	Season	League			National cup (Note: Includes Taça de Portugal, Austrian Cup)		League cup (Note: Includes Taça da Liga)		Europe		Other		Total	
Club	Season	Division	Apps	Goals	Apps	Goals	Apps	Goals	Apps	Goals	Apps	Goals	Apps	Goals
Portimonense	2022–23	Primeira Liga	5	0	0	0	0	0	—		—		5	0
Portimonense	2023–24	Primeira Liga	27	2	2	0	2	0	—		1 (Note: Appearance in Primeira Liga relegation play-offs)	0	32	2
Portimonense	2024–25	Liga Portugal 2	23	0	1	0	—		—		—		24	0
Portimonense	Total		55	2	3	0	2	0	—		1	0	61	2
LASK (loan)	2025–26	Austrian Bundesliga	23	1	5	0	—		—		—		28	1
LASK	2026–27	Austrian Bundesliga	11	0	2	1	—		6 (Note: Appearances in UEFA Champions League)	0	—		19	1
Career total			89	3	10	1	2	0	6	0	1	0	108	4

== Honours ==
LASK

- Austrian Bundesliga: 2025–26
- Austrian Cup: 2025–26
