= Tobias Lawal =

Austrian footballer

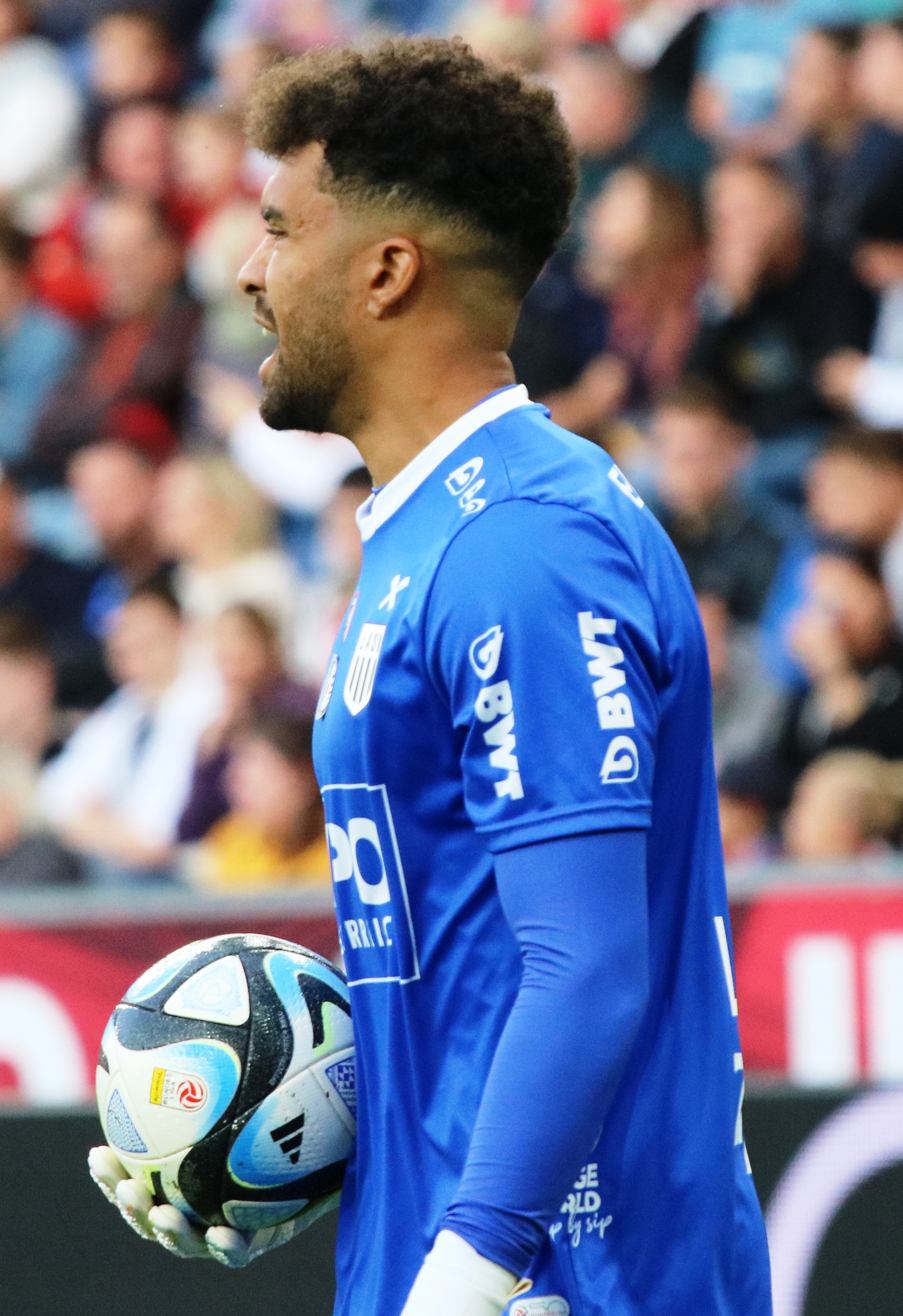
- Lawal in 2023

Personal information
- Full name: Tobias Okikiola Lawal
- Date of birth: 7 June 2000 (age 26)
- Place of birth: Linz, Austria
- Height: 1.95 m (6 ft 5 in)
- Position: Goalkeeper

Team information
- Current team: Genk
- Number: 26

Youth career
- 2008–2013: ASKÖ Donau Linz
- 2013–2014: LASK Juniors OÖ
- 2014–2018: AKA Linz

Senior career*
Years	Team	Apps	(Gls)
2017–2022	LASK Juniors OÖ	65	(0)
2017	→ FC Wels (loan)	8	(0)
2018–2025	LASK	59	(0)
2025–	Genk	18	(0)

International career^{‡}
2018	Austria U19	1	(0)
2019	Austria U20	1	(0)
2021	Austria U21	2	(0)
2025–	Austria	1	(0)
- * Club domestic league appearances and goals as of 22 March 2026 ‡ National team caps and goals as of 23:35, 10 June 2025 (UTC)

Tobias Okikiola Lawal (born 7 June 2000) is an Austrian professional footballer who plays as a goalkeeper for Genk in the Belgian Pro League and the Austria national team.

== Club career ==
Lawal started his career with ASKÖ Donau Linz. In 2013, he transferred to LASK Juniors. In 2014, he joined AKA Linz, where he played till 2018 before returning to LASK Juniors.

In June 2017, he made his debut for LASK Juniors against USV Allerheiligen, in September that same year, he joined FC Wels on loan and made his debut in the Regionalliga against SV Ried Amateure on Matchday 8. During the winter break of that season, he rejoined LASK Juniors.

Lawal was part of the LASK Juniors OÖ team that got promoted to the Second League in 2018 where he made his first professional league debut against Wacker Innsbruck II on the first matchday of that season. He was promoted to the senior LASK team in 2020 and made his debut in the Bundesliga, in a 3–0 defeat to Rapid Vienna.

On 9 July 2025, Lawal signed a four-year contract with Genk in Belgium.

== International career ==
Lawal was born in Austria to a Nigerian father and an Austrian mother. Lawal made his debut for the Austria U19 team in September 2018 in a friendly versus Denmark. In June 2019, he played for the U20 team in a match against Switzerland. In September 2020, he was called up by Gernot Rohr for Nigeria for the friendly matches against Algeria and Tunisia.

Lawal was first called up to the senior Austria national team in November 2023 for a Euro qualifier against Estonia. After several more call-ups as a back-up in the next two seasons, Lawal made his debut on 10 June 2025 in a World Cup qualifier against San Marino.

== Career statistics ==
=== Club ===
As of match played 22 March 2026

Appearances and goals by club, season and competition
Club	Season	League			National Cup		Europe		Other		Total	
Club	Season	Division	Apps	Goals	Apps	Goals	Apps	Goals	Apps	Goals	Apps	Goals
Juniors OÖ	2018–19	2. Liga	23	0	—		—		—		23	0
Juniors OÖ	2019–20	2. Liga	20	0	1	0	—		—		21	0
Juniors OÖ	2020–21	2. Liga	15	0	0	0	—		—		15	0
Juniors OÖ	2021–22	2. Liga	7	0	—		—		—		7	0
Juniors OÖ	Total		72	0	1	0	0	0	0	0	73	0
Wels (loan)	2017–18	OÖ Liga	8	0	—		—		—		8	0
LASK	2018–19	Austrian Bundesliga	0	0	0	0	0	0	0	0	0	0
LASK	2019–20	Austrian Bundesliga	0	0	0	0	0	0	0	0	0	0
LASK	2020–21	Austrian Bundesliga	2	0	0	0	0	0	0	0	2	0
LASK	2021–22	Austrian Bundesliga	0	0	0	0	0	0	0	0	0	0
LASK	2022–23	Austrian Bundesliga	7	0	0	0	0	0	0	0	7	0
LASK	2023–24	Austrian Bundesliga	32	0	2	0	7 (Note: Appearances in UEFA Europa League)	0	0	0	41	0
LASK	2024–25	Austrian Bundesliga	18	0	2	0	0	0	—		20	0
LASK	Total		59	0	4	0	7	0	0	0	70	0
Genk	2025–26	Belgian Pro League	18	0	0	0	8	0	—		26	0
Career total			144	0	5	0	15	0	0	0	164	0

=== International ===
As of 10 June 2025

Appearances and goals by national team and year
National team	Year	Apps	Goals
Austria	2025	1	0
Total		1	0
