= Manfred Nastl =

Austrian footballer and coach

Personal information
- Date of birth: 2 January 1972 (age 54)
- Place of birth: Langenlois, Austria
- Height: 1.68 m (5 ft 6 in)
- Position: Forward

Senior career*
| Years | Team | Apps | (Gls) |
| –1995 | Austria Wien | 6 | (0) |
| 1996–1997 | Favoritner AC | 17 | (4) |
| 1997 | Wiener SC | 10 | (5) |
| 1997–2000 | SV Horn | 33 | (11) |
| 2000–2001 | SV Hundsheim | 31 | (14) |
| 2001–2002 | SC Eisenstadt | 21 | (4) |
| 2002–2003 | Austria Wien II | 22 | (6) |
| 2003–2004 | ASK Schwadorf 1936 | | |
| 2004–2005 | UFC Stotzing | | |
| 2005 | SV Böheimkirchen | | |
| 2005–2006 | ASC Marathon Korneuburg | | |

International career
| 1992 | Austria U21 | 2 | (0) |

Managerial career
- 2006–2007: SV Schwechat (assistant)
- 2008–2010: Admira Wacker II (assistant)
- 2010: Admira Wacker II
- 2010–2013: Admira Wacker (assistant)
- 2013–2015: Wolfsberger AC (assistant)
- 2016–2017: Wolfsberger AC (U18)
- 2017–2018: Wolfsberger AC (sporting director)
- 2018: St. Pölten (assistant)
- 2018–2021: Rapid Wien (assistant)
- * Club domestic league appearances and goals

Manfred Nastl (born 2 January 1972) is a former Austrian footballer who played as a forward. He is currently coach.
