= Raiffeisen Arena (Linz) =

Football stadium in Linz, Upper Austria

Coordinates: 48°17′37″N 14°16′36″E

- Gugl-Stadion; Oberösterreich Arena
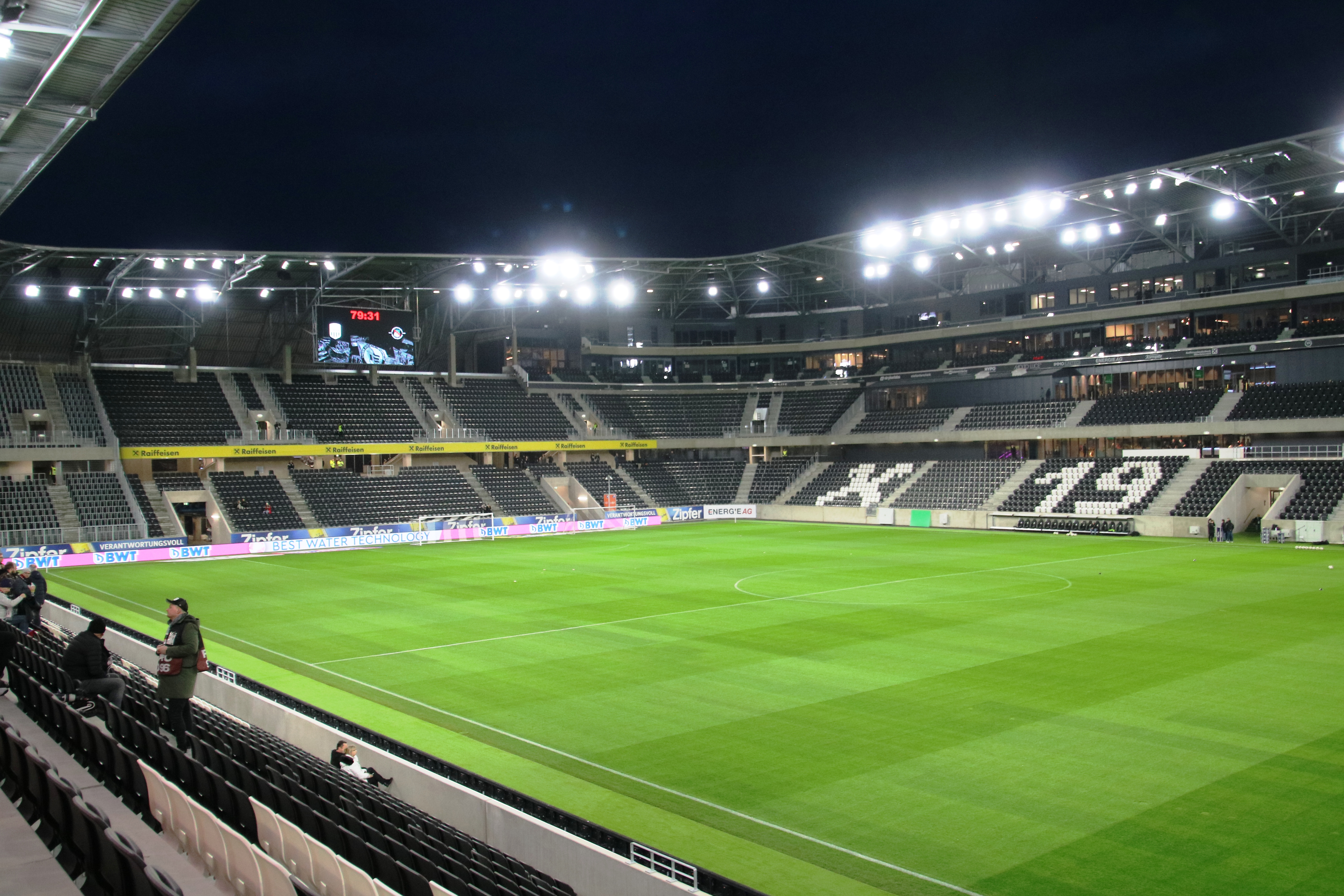
- Interactive map of Raiffeisen Arena
- Location: Linz, Upper Austria, Austria
- Capacity: 19,080
- Surface: Grass
- Field size: 105 x 68

Construction
- Built: 2021–2023
- Opened: 17 February 2023
- Architect: Harald Fux (Raumkunst ZT GmbH)

Tenants
- LASK; Austria national football team (selected matches)

Raiffeisen Arena is a football stadium in Linz, the capital of the state of Upper Austria. It opened in 2023 on the site of the Linzer Stadion, which was built in 1952 and demolished in 2021. The new stadium has a total of 19,080 seats (standing, seated and box seats), with 17,117 seats available for international matches.

The cost of the stadium was 65 million euros. With the additional facilities (e.g. offices, training grounds or daytime restaurant), it would be 85 million euros. Due to the increased cost of construction materials, the exact cost will not be known until after completion. Right next to the stadium is the TipsArena Linz multipurpose arena with a six-lane, 200-meter synthetic track and a maximum seating capacity of 8,755.

In European competitions, the stadium is known as Oberösterreich Arena due to advertising rules.

== Opening ==
On 17 February 2023 the arena was used for a football match for the first time. The LASK women's team met SPG Geretsberg/Bürmoos in a test match. The LASK women won the game 4:1. Captain Katharina Mayr scored the first goal in the new stadium. The men's first game took place on 24 February. LASK met SC Austria Lustenau on the 19th match day of the Bundesliga. LASK won the game 1–0 in front of 12,000 spectators.

== Pictures ==
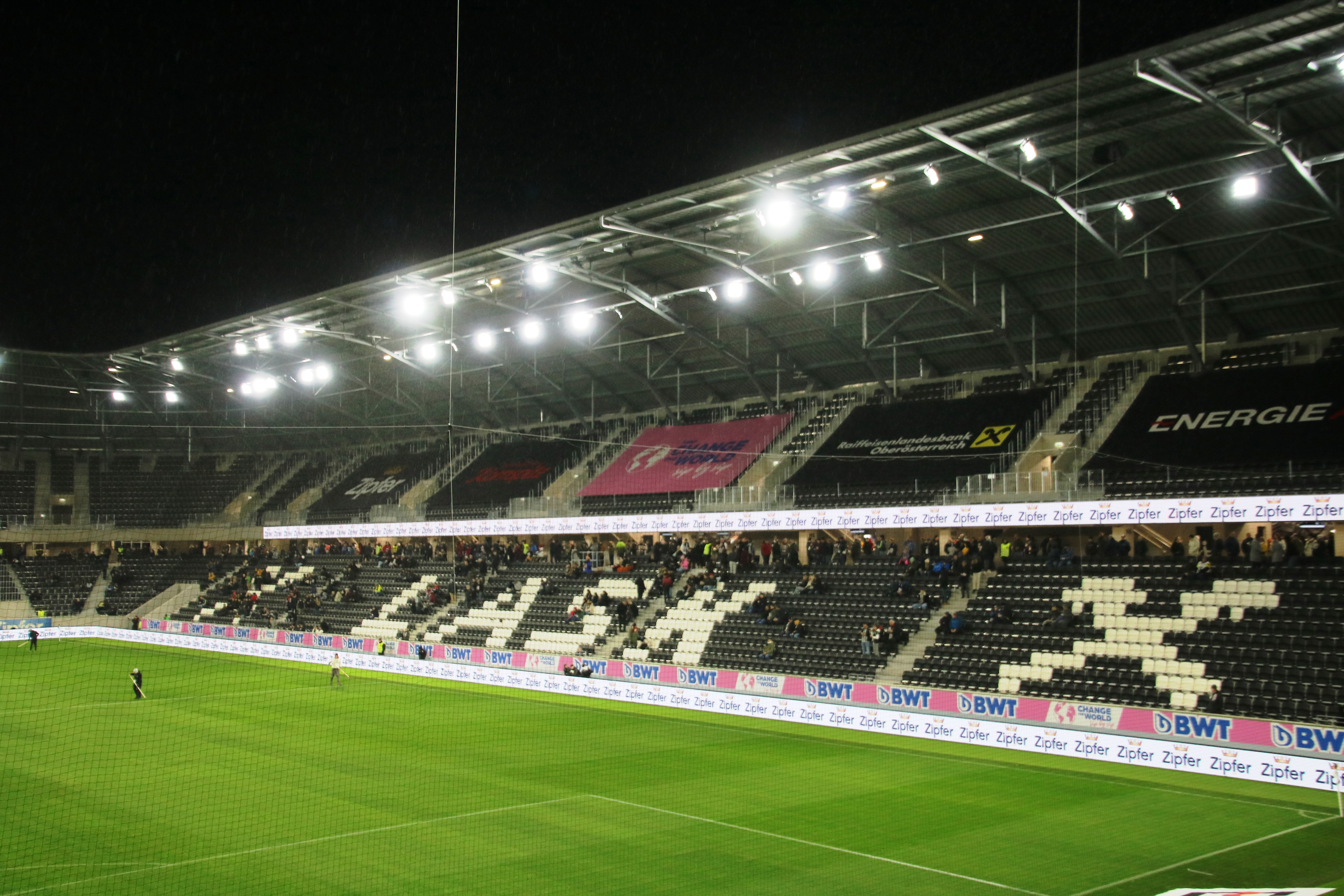

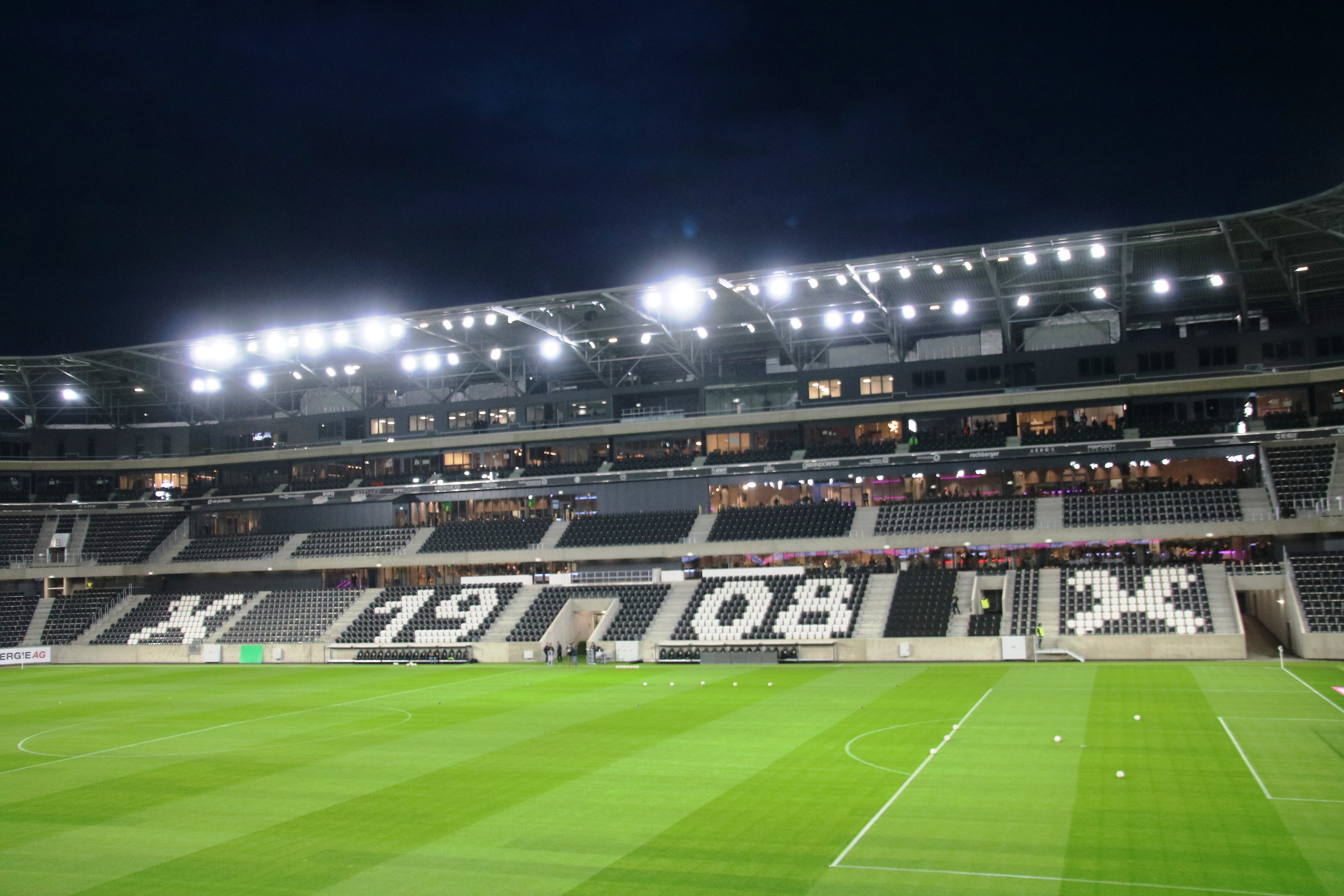

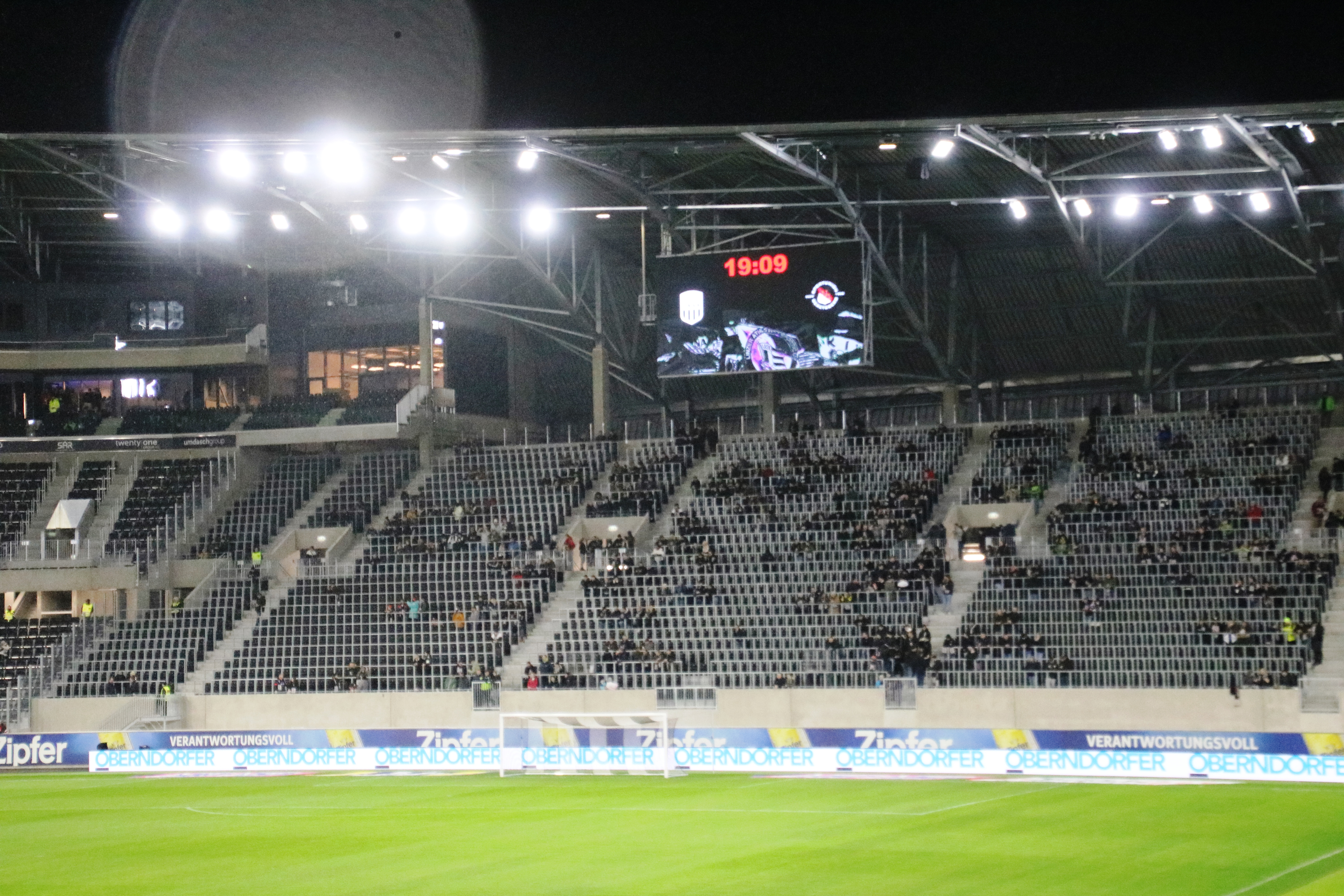
