= Maximilian Ritscher =

Austrian footballer

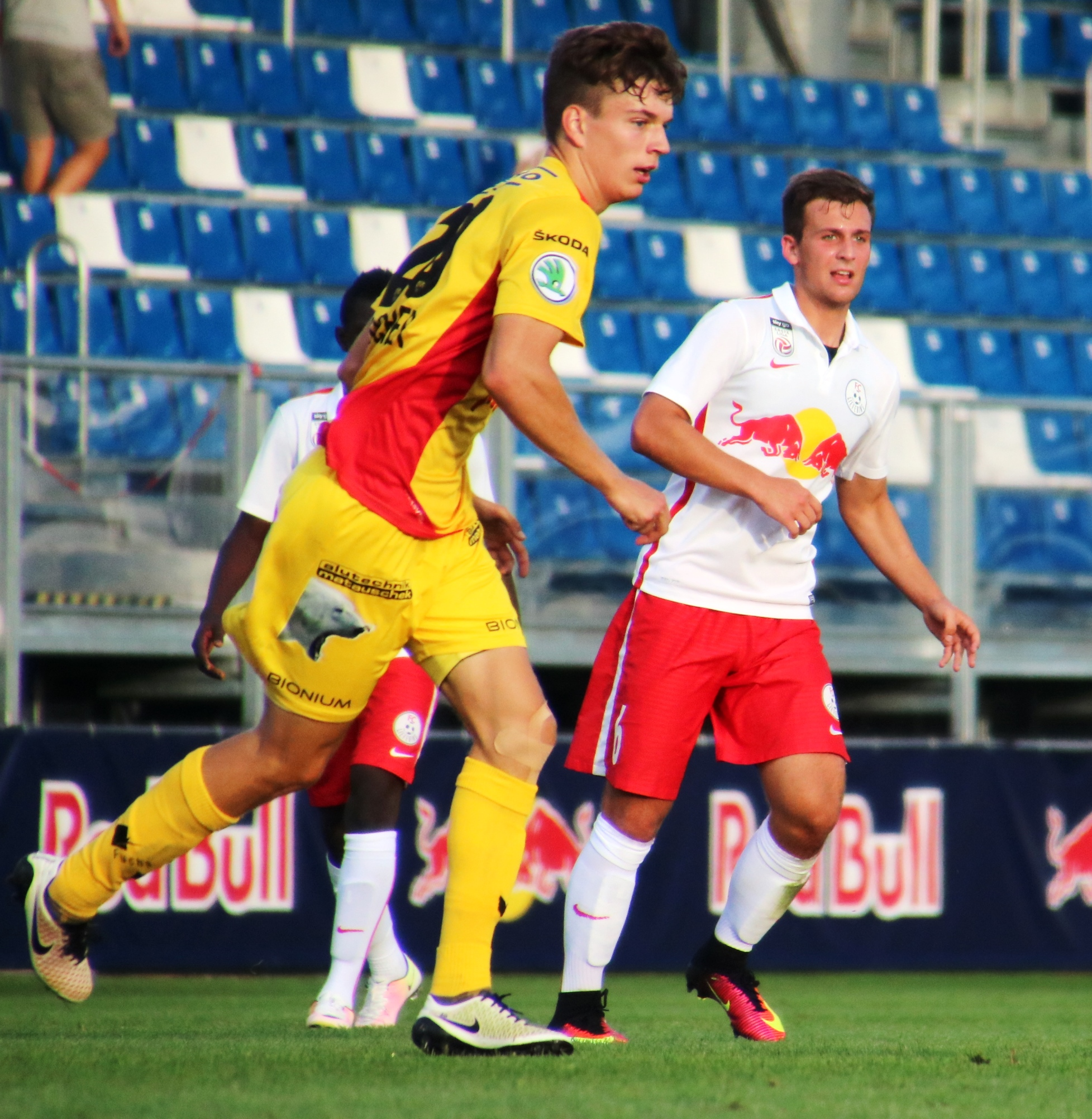
- Ritscher (left) in 2016

Personal information
- Date of birth: 11 January 1994 (age 32)
- Place of birth: Lienz, Austria
- Height: 1.87 m (6 ft 1 1/2 in)
- Position: Defender

Team information
- Current team: LASK (interim)

Youth career
- 2008–2011: AKA Kärnten

Senior career*
Years	Team	Apps	(Gls)
2011–2012	ATSV Wolfsberg	2	(0)
2012	SAK Klagenfurt	9	(1)
2012–2014	Wolfsberger AC	2	(0)
2012–2015	Wolfsberger AC II	73	(3)
2015–2017	Kapfenberger SV	32	(2)
2017	Juniors OÖ	0	(0)

Managerial career
- 2017: ASKÖ Dellach/Drau (youth)
- 2018–2020: AKA Linz
- 2020–2022: Juniors OÖ (co-trainer)
- 2025: LASK (interim)
- 2025–: LASK (interim)
- * Club domestic league appearances and goals as of 1 February 2017

Maximilian Ritscher (born 11 January 1994) is an Austrian former footballer and football manager who is currently the interim manager of Austrian Bundesliga club LASK.

== Managerial career ==
In April 2025, Ritscher became the interim coach of LASK. On 24 September 2025, Ritscher became the interim coach of LASK again following the dismissal of former manager João Sacramento.
