= 2019–20 LASK season =

LASK
2019–20 season
- Chairman: Siegmund Gruber
- Manager: Valérien Ismaël
- Stadium: Waldstadion & Linzer Stadion for UEFA competitions.
- Austrian Bundesliga: 4th
- Austrian Cup: Semi-finals
- UEFA Champions League: Play-off round
- UEFA Europa League: Round of 16
- Top goalscorer: League: Klauss (12); All: Klauss (20)
Home colours	Away colours	Third colours

The 2019–20 season was Linzer Athletik-Sport-Klub's 112th season in existence and the club's 3rd consecutive season in the top flight of Austrian football. In addition to the domestic league, LASK participated in this season's editions of the Austrian Cup, the UEFA Champions League and also participated in the UEFA Europa League.

== Current squad ==
As of 4 September 2019

Note: Flags indicate national team as defined under FIFA eligibility rules; some limited exceptions apply. Players may hold more than one non-FIFA nationality.

No.	Pos.	Nation	Player
1	GK	AUT	Alexander Schlager
5	DF	CRO	Petar Filipović
6	DF	AUT	Philipp Wiesinger
7	MF	AUT	Rene Renner
8	MF	AUT	Peter Michorl
9	FW	BRA	João Klauss (on loan from Hoffenheim)
11	MF	AUT	Dominik Reiter
14	MF	AUT	Husein Balić
15	DF	AUT	Christian Ramsebner
16	DF	AUT	Marvin Potzmann
17	DF	AUT	David Schnegg
18	DF	AUT	Gernot Trauner

No.	Pos.	Nation	Player
19	MF	AUT	Valentino Müller
20	FW	GHA	Samuel Tetteh (on loan from Red Bull Salzburg)
21	DF	AUT	Markus Wostry
23	MF	AUT	Stefan Haudum
24	GK	AUT	Tobias Lawal
25	MF	AUS	James Holland
26	DF	AUT	Reinhold Ranftl
27	MF	AUT	Thomas Goiginger
28	MF	AUT	Dominik Frieser
29	FW	AUT	Marko Raguž
33	FW	AUT	Thomas Sabitzer
36	GK	AUT	Thomas Gebauer

=== Out on loan ===
Note: Flags indicate national team as defined under FIFA eligibility rules; some limited exceptions apply. Players may hold more than one non-FIFA nationality.

No.	Pos.	Nation	Player
—	DF	AUT	Felix Luckeneder (at TSV Hartberg until 30 June 2020)

== Pre-season and friendlies ==
Win Draw Loss

5 July 2019 Friendly	LASK	1–0	Sparta Prague	Leonfelden, Austria
12:30 CEST (UTC+2)				Stadium: Sportplatz Bad Leonfelden

6 July 2019 Friendly	LASK	2–1	Bohemians 1905	Perg, Austria
16:30 CEST (UTC+2)				Stadium: abd-Arena Perg

13 July 2019 Friendly	LASK	1–1	1. FC Heidenheim	Pasching, Austria
15:30 CEST (UTC+2)				Stadium: Waldstadion

== Competitions ==
Win Draw Loss

=== Overview ===
Competition	First match	Last match	Starting round	Final position	Record							
Competition	First match	Last match	Starting round	Final position	Pld	W	D	L	GF	GA	GD	Win %
Bundesliga	28 July 2019	5 July 2020	Matchday 1	4th	32	20	4	8	67	37	+30	62.50
Austrian Cup	20 July 2019	5 March 2020	First round	Semi-finals	5	4	0	1	15	5	+10	80.00
Champions League	7 August 2019	28 August 2019	Third qualifying round	Play-off round	3	2	0	1	6	5	+1	66.67
Europa League	19 September 2019	5 August 2020	Group stage	Round of 16	10	5	2	3	15	11	+4	50.00
Total					50	31	6	13	103	58	+45	62.00

Last updated: 5 August 2020.
Source: Soccerway

=== Bundesliga ===
==== Regular stage ====
===== Results summary =====
Overall								Home						Away					
Pld	W	D	L	GF	GA	GD	Pts	W	D	L	GF	GA	GD	W	D	L	GF	GA	GD
22	17	3	2	50	20	+30	54	7	3	2	28	15	+13	10	0	0	22	5	+17

Last updated: 8 March 2020.
Source: See Results

===== Results by round =====
Round	1	2	3	4	5	6	7	8	9	10	11	12	13	14	15	16	17	18	19	20	21	22
Ground	H	A	A	H	A	H	A	H	A	A	H	A	H	H	A	H	A	H	A	H	H	A
Result	W	W	W	D	W	L	W	D	W	W	W	W	W	W	W	L	W	D	W	W	W	W
Position	5	2	2	2	2	2	2	3	2	2	2	2	2	2	2	2	2	2	1	1	1	1

Updated to match(es) played on 8 March 2020. Source: See Results
A = Away; H = Home; W = Win; D = Draw; L = Loss

===== Matches =====
28 July 2019 1	LASK	2–0	Rheindorf Altach	Linz
17:00 CEST (UTC+2)	Tetteh 7'; Klauss 79'	Report		Stadium: Waldstadion Pasching; Attendance: 5,087; Referee: Harald Lechner

3 August 2019 2	Austria Wien	0–3	LASK	Vienna
17:00 CEST (UTC+2)		Report	Ramsebner 42'; Trauner 87'; Raguž 90+2'	Stadium: Generali Arena; Attendance: 8,248; Referee: Sebastian Gishamer

10 August 2019 3	Admira Wacker	0–1	LASK	Maria Enzersdorf
17:00 CEST (UTC+2)		Report	Müller 45+2'	Stadium: BSFZ-Arena; Attendance: 2,037; Referee: Robert Schörgenhofer

17 August 2019 4	LASK	1–1	Wattens	Linz
17:00 CEST (UTC+2)	Wiesinger 81'	Report	Dedić 44'	Stadium: Waldstadion Pasching; Attendance: 5,083; Referee: Felix Ouschan

24 August 2019 5	Rapid Wien	1–2	LASK	Vienna
17:00 CEST (UTC+2)	Schobesberger 47'	Report	Raguž 23', 90+5'	Stadium: Allianz Stadion; Attendance: 18,607; Referee: Christian-Petru Ciochirca

31 August 2019 6	LASK	0–1	Wolfsberger AC	Linz
17:00 CEST (UTC+2)		Report	Liendl 80'	Stadium: Waldstadion Pasching; Attendance: 5,155; Referee: Sebastian Gishamer

14 September 2019 7	Sturm Graz	0–2	LASK	Graz
17:00 CEST (UTC+2)		Report	Goiginger 75'; Klauss 77'	Stadium: Merkur-Arena; Attendance: 10,820; Referee: Walter Altmann

22 September 2019 8	LASK	2–2	Red Bull Salzburg	Linz
17:00 CEST (UTC+2)	Goiginger 4', (yellow card) 80'; Frieser 18'; Trauner (yellow card) 40'; Filipović (yellow card) 45+2' (yellow-red card) 75'; Wiesinger (yellow card) 57'; Michorl (yellow card) 76'	Report	Mwepu (yellow card) 17'; Daka 32', 90'	Stadium: Waldstadion Pasching; Attendance: 6,018; Referee: Robert Schörgenhofer

28 September 2019 9	SKN St. Pölten	0–3	LASK	Sankt Pölten
17:00 CEST (UTC+2)		Report	Potzmann 7'; Frieser 38'; Holland 50'	Stadium: NV Arena; Attendance: 2,888; Referee: Felix Ouschan

6 October 2019 10	Hartberg	1–2	LASK	Hartberg
14:30 CEST (UTC+2)	Ostrák 56'	Report	Ranftl 65'; Michorl 69'	Stadium: Profertil Arena Hartberg; Attendance: 2,750; Referee: Walter Altmann

19 October 2019 11	LASK	7–2	Mattersburg	Linz
17:00 CEST (UTC+2)	Trauner 10'; Goiginger 24', 70'; Ranftl 37', 74'; Raguž 64'; Tetteh 79'	Report	Gruber 6'; Malić 34'	Stadium: Waldstadion Pasching; Attendance: 5,420; Referee: Andreas Heiß

27 October 2019 12	Rheindorf Altach	0–1	LASK	Altach
14:30 CEST (UTC+2)		Report	Klauss 41'	Stadium: Stadion Schnabelholz; Attendance: 3,597; Referee: Christopher Jäger

3 November 2019 13	LASK	2–0	Austria Wien	Linz
17:00 CET (UTC+1)	Ranftl 7'; Filipović 64'	Report		Stadium: Waldstadion Pasching; Attendance: 5,617; Referee: Rene Eisner

10 November 2019 14	LASK	1–0	Admira Wacker	Linz
14:30 CET (UTC+1)	Goiginger 31'	Report		Stadium: Waldstadion Pasching; Attendance: 5,410; Referee: Julian Weinberger

23 November 2019 15	Wattens	0–2	LASK	Innsbruck
17:00 CET (UTC+1)		Report	Michorl 79'; Tetteh 90+4'	Stadium: Tivoli-Neu; Attendance: 2,255; Referee: Josef Spurny

1 December 2019 16	LASK	0–4	Rapid Wien	Linz
17:00 CET (UTC+1)	Goiginger (red card) 84'	Report	Knasmüllner 34'; Fountas 67'; Filipović 84' (pen.); Badji 90+3'	Stadium: Waldstadion Pasching; Attendance: 6,041; Referee: Sebastian Gishamer

7 December 2019 17	Wolfsberger AC	1–3	LASK	Wolfsberg
17:00 CET (UTC+1)	Weissman 78'	Report	Filipović 21'; Tetteh 41'; Frieser 85'	Stadium: Lavanttal-Arena; Attendance: 1,382; Referee: Harald Lechner

15 December 2019 18	LASK	3–3	Sturm Graz	Linz
17:00 CET (UTC+1)	Spendlhofer 38' (pen.); Wostry 45+2'; Klauss 74'	Report	Röcher 4'; Hierländer 9'; Kiteishvili 24'	Stadium: Waldstadion Pasching; Attendance: 5,768; Referee: Christopher Jäger

14 February 2020 19	Red Bull Salzburg	2–3	LASK	Wals-Siezenheim
19:00 CET (UTC+1)	Ramalho (yellow card) 21'; Mwepu (yellow card) 35', (goal) 81'; Okugawa 40'; Wöber (yellow card) 72'	Report	Frieser 20', 56'; Holland 25', (yellow card) 41'; Filipović (yellow card) 51'; Wiesinger (yellow card) 61'; Ranftl (yellow card) 83'; Balić (yellow card) 86'	Stadium: Stadion Wals-Siezenheim; Attendance: 17,018; Referee: Harald Lechner

23 February 2020 20	LASK	4–1	SKN St. Pölten	Linz
14:30 CET (UTC+1)	Klauss 7'; Balić 9', 13'; Haudum 69'	Report	Muhamedbegovic 19'	Stadium: Waldstadion Pasching; Attendance: 5,373; Referee: Josef Spurny

1 March 2020 21	LASK	5–1	Hartberg	Linz
17:00 CET (UTC+1)	Klauss 51', 62', 89'; Michorl 59'; Tetteh 80'	Report	Klem 6'	Stadium: Waldstadion Pasching; Attendance: 5,328; Referee: Christopher Jäger

8 March 2020 22	Mattersburg	0–1	LASK	Mattersburg
14:30 CET (UTC+1)		Report	Klauss 21'	Stadium: Pappelstadion; Attendance: 2,393; Referee: Alexander Harkam

==== Championship stage ====
===== Results summary =====
Overall								Home						Away					
Pld	W	D	L	GF	GA	GD	Pts	W	D	L	GF	GA	GD	W	D	L	GF	GA	GD
10	3	1	6	17	17	0	10	1	0	4	5	7	−2	2	1	2	12	10	+2

Last updated: 5 July 2020.
Source: See Results

===== Results by round =====
Round	1	2	3	4	5	6	7	8	9	10
Ground	H	A	H	A	H	A	A	H	A	H
Result	L	D	L	L	W	W	W	L	L	L
Position	3	4	4	4	3	3	2	3	3	4

Updated to match(es) played on 5 July 2020. Source: See Results
A = Away; H = Home; W = Win; D = Draw; L = Loss

===== Matches =====
3 June 2020 1	LASK	1–2	Hartberg	Linz
18:30 CEST (UTC+2)	Klauss 9'	Report	Rep 24'; Tadić 90+3'	Stadium: Waldstadion Pasching; Attendance: 0 Referee: Markus Hameter

7 June 2020 2	Wolfsberger AC	3–3	LASK	Wolfsberg
17:00 CEST (UTC+2)	Dieng 58'; Liendl 72'; Novak 89'	Report	Frieser 35'; Trauner 56'; Tetteh 90+1'	Stadium: Lavanttal-Arena; Attendance: 0 Referee: Alexander Harkam

10 June 2020 3	LASK	0–1	Rapid Wien	Linz
18:30 CEST (UTC+2)		Report	Fountas 87'	Stadium: Waldstadion Pasching; Attendance: 0 Referee: Robert Schörgenhofer

14 June 2020 4	Red Bull Salzburg	3–1	LASK	Wals-Siezenheim
19:30 CEST (UTC+2)	Szoboszlai 8'; Daka 11'; Vallci 81'	Report	Holland (yellow card) 24'; Raguž 56'; Trauner (yellow card) 89'	Stadium: Stadion Wals-Siezenheim; Attendance: 0 Referee: Walter Altmann

17 June 2020 5	LASK	4–0	Sturm Graz	Linz
20:30 CEST (UTC+2)	Michorl 9'; Frieser 25'; Filipović (yellow card) 32'; Raguž (yellow card) 37'; Holland 39'; Klauss 90+2'	Report	Jäger (yellow card) 57'; Sakic (yellow card) 68'	Stadium: Waldstadion Pasching; Attendance: 0 Referee: Andreas Heiß

21 June 2020 6	Sturm Graz	0–2	LASK	Graz
19:30 CEST (UTC+2)	Balaj (yellow card) 2' (yellow-red card) 31'; Donkor (yellow card) 45' (yellow-red card) 72'	Report	Raguž 45+1' (pen.); Tetteh 83'	Stadium: Merkur-Arena; Attendance: 0 Referee: Julian Weinberger

24 June 2020 7	Hartberg	1–5	LASK	Hartberg
18:30 CEST (UTC+2)	Rep (yellow card) 66'; Ried (yellow card) 78'; Dossou 82'	Report	Frieser 53' (pen.); Ranftl 61', (yellow card) 88'; Reiter 69'; Michorl 74'; Raguž 84'; Andrade (yellow card) 87'	Stadium: Profertil Arena Hartberg; Attendance: 0 Referee: Josef Spurny

28 June 2020 8	LASK	0–1	Wolfsberger AC	Linz
17:00 CEST (UTC+2)	Wiesinger (yellow card) 40'; Filipović (yellow card) 71'	Report	Leitgeb (yellow card) 66'; Weissman 88' (pen.), (yellow card) 89'	Stadium: Waldstadion Pasching; Attendance: 0 Referee: Christian-Petru Ciochirca

1 July 2020 9	Rapid Wien	3–1	LASK	Vienna
20:30 CEST (UTC+2)	Andrade 4' (o.g.); Stojković (yellow card) 17'; Fountas 45+1'; Ljubicic (yellow card) 47'; Petrovič (yellow card) 89'; Knasmüllner 90+2'	Report	Raguž (yellow card) 49'; Michorl (yellow card) 69'; Klauss 72'	Stadium: Allianz Stadion; Attendance: 0 Referee: Walter Altmann

5 July 2020 10	LASK	0–3	Red Bull Salzburg	Linz
17:00 CEST (UTC+2)	Andrade (yellow card) 17'; Trauner (yellow card) 58'	Report	Szoboszlai 67' (pen.); Ramalho 73', (yellow card) 81'; Camara 90+5' (pen.)	Stadium: Waldstadion Pasching; Attendance: 0 Referee: Robert Schörgenhofer

=== Austrian Cup ===
20 July 2019 First round	UVB Vöcklamarkt	2–6	LASK	Vöcklamarkt
20:00 CEST (UTC+2)	Fröschl 27'; Olivotto 60'	Report	Klauss 4', 74'; Frieser 50', 90+3'; Michorl 56'; Otubanjo 90+1'	Stadium: Sportzentrum Union Volksbank Vöcklamarkt

25 September 2019 Second round	SC Wiener Viktoria	1–4	LASK	Wien
12:30 CEST (UTC+2)	Rotter 65'	Report	Michorl 14'; Goiginger 47', 61'; Raguž 72'	Stadium: Sportplatz WAF Gruabn

30 October 2019 Third round	LASK	3–1	Rheindorf Altach	Pasching
19:30 CET (UTC+1)	Trauner 5'; Frieser 30'; Kobras 40' (o.g.)	Report	Fischer 72'	Stadium: Waldstadion; Attendance: 4,127; Referee: Sebastian Gishamer

8 February 2020 Quarter-finals	LASK	2–0	Sturm Graz	Pasching
18:00 CET (UTC+1)	Klauss 60'; Balić 90+4'	Report		Stadium: Waldstadion; Attendance: 9,153; Referee: Walter Altmann

5 March 2020 Semi-finals	Red Bull Salzburg	1–0	LASK	Wals-Siezenheim
20:45 CET (UTC+1)	Hwang 50'; Ramalho (yellow card) 75'; Szoboszlai (yellow card) 80'; Stankovic (yellow card) 90+1'; Mwepu (yellow card) 90+1' (yellow-red card) 90+4'; Vallci (yellow card) 90+3'; Ashimeru (yellow card) 90+6'	Report	Frieser (yellow card) 30'; Schlager (yellow card) 50'; Ranftl (yellow card) 73' (red card) 90+8'; Wiesinger (yellow card) 90+6'	Stadium: Stadion Wals-Siezenheim; Attendance: 10,021; Referee: Robert Schörgenhofer

=== UEFA Champions League ===
==== Third qualifying round ====
7 August 2019 First leg	Basel (Switzerland)	1–2	(Austria) LASK	Basel, Switzerland
20:00 CEST (UTC+2)	Riveros (yellow card) 28'; Zuffi 87'	Report	Michorl (yellow card) 26'; Trauner 51'; Klauss 82'	Stadium: St. Jakob-Park; Attendance: 20,470; Referee: Andreas Ekberg (Sweden)

13 August 2019 Second leg	LASK (Austria)	3–1 (5–2 agg.)	(Switzerland) Basel	Linz, Austria
20:30 CEST (UTC+2)	Ranftl (yellow card) 51', (goal) 59'; Stocker (yellow card) 63'; Goiginger 89'; Raguž 90+4'	Report	Ademi 80'	Stadium: Linzer Stadion; Attendance: 12,966; Referee: Aliyar Aghayev (Azerbaijan)

==== Play-off round ====
20 August 2019 First leg	LASK (Austria)	0–1	(Belgium) Club Brugge	Linz, Austria
21:00 CEST (UTC+2)	Renner (yellow card) 16'; Trauner (yellow card) 51'; Wiesinger (yellow card) 73'; Frieser (yellow card) 79'	Report	Vanaken 10' (pen.); Mata (yellow card) 53'	Stadium: Linzer Stadion; Attendance: 12,637; Referee: Szymon Marciniak (Poland)

28 August 2019 Second leg	Club Brugge (Belgium)	2–1 (3–1 agg.)	(Austria) LASK	Bruges, Belgium
21:00 CEST (UTC+2)	Vanaken 70'; Rits (yellow card) 73'; Dennis 89'	Report	Michorl (yellow card) 55'; Trauner (yellow card) 72' (yellow-red card) 81'; Klauss 74' (pen.); Wiesinger (yellow card) 90+4'	Stadium: Jan Breydel Stadium; Attendance: 25,319; Referee: Felix Brych (Germany)

=== UEFA Europa League ===
==== Group stage ====
Pos	Team	Pld	W	D	L	GF	GA	GD	Pts	Qualification	LASK	SPO	PSV	ROS
1	(Austria) LASK	6	4	1	1	11	4	+7	13	Advance to knockout phase	—	3–0	4–1	1–0
2	(Portugal) Sporting CP	6	4	0	2	11	7	+4	12	Advance to knockout phase	2–1	—	4–0	1–0
3	(Netherlands) PSV Eindhoven	6	2	2	2	9	12	−3	8		0–0	3–2	—	1–1
4	(Norway) Rosenborg	6	0	1	5	3	11	−8	1		1–2	0–2	1–4	—

Source: UEFA
Rules for classification: Group stage tiebreakers

19 September 2019 1	LASK (Austria)	1–0	(Norway) Rosenborg	Linz, Austria
18:55 CEST (UTC+2)	Renner (yellow card) 26'; Holland 45+3'; Filipovic (yellow card) 54'	Report	Hedenstad (yellow card) 44'; Meling (yellow card) 56'; Hovland (yellow card) 84'	Stadium: Linzer Stadion (Note: LASK played their home matches at Linzer Stadion, Linz, instead of their regular home stadium Waldstadion, Pasching.); Attendance: 12,179; Referee: Donatas Rumšas (Lithuania)

3 October 2019 2	Sporting CP (Portugal)	2–1	(Austria) LASK	Lisbon, Portugal
21:00 CEST (UTC+2)	Luiz Phellype 58'; Fernandes 63'	Report	Raguž 16'	Stadium: Estádio José Alvalade; Attendance: 31,225; Referee: Alain Durieux (Luxembourg)

24 October 2019 3	PSV (Netherlands)	0–0	(Austria) LASK	Eindhoven, Netherlands
21:00 CEST (UTC+2)		Report		Stadium: Philips Stadion; Attendance: 29,000; Referee: Chris Kavanagh (England)

7 November 2019 4	LASK (Austria)	4–1	(Netherlands) PSV	Linz, Austria
18:55 CET (UTC+1)	Ranftl 56'; Frieser 60'; Klauss 78', 82'	Report	Schwaab 5' (pen.)	Stadium: Linzer Stadion; Attendance: 12,658; Referee: Radu Petrescu (Romania)

28 November 2019 5	Rosenborg (Norway)	1–2	(Austria) LASK	Trondheim, Norway
21:00 CET (UTC+1)	Johnsen 45', (yellow card) 57'	Report	Goiginger 20'; Frieser 54'	Stadium: Lerkendal Stadion; Attendance: 9,775; Referee: Giorgi Kruashvili (Georgia)

12 December 2019 6	LASK (Austria)	3–0	(Portugal) Sporting CP	Linz, Austria
18:55 CET (UTC+1)	Trauner 23'; Klauss 38' (pen.); Raguž 90+3'	Report		Stadium: Linzer Stadion; Attendance: 11,627; Referee: Willie Collum (Scotland)

==== Knockout phase ====
===== Round of 32 =====
20 February 2020 First leg	AZ (Netherlands)	1–1	(Austria) LASK	Alkmaar, Netherlands
21:00 CET (UTC+1)	Stengs (yellow card) 31'; Boadu (yellow card) 34'; De Wit (yellow card) 71'; Koopmeiners 86' (pen.)	Report	Raguž 26'; Renner (yellow card) 29'; Filipović (yellow card) 42'; Holland (yellow card) 86'	Stadium: AFAS Stadion; Attendance: 12,526; Referee: Mattias Gestranius (Finland)

27 February 2020 Second leg	LASK (Austria)	2–0 (3–1 agg.)	(Netherlands) AZ	Linz, Austria
18:55 CET (UTC+1)	Wiesinger (yellow card) 37' (yellow-red card) 88'; Raguž 44' (pen.), 50'; Filipović (yellow card) 63'	Report	Wijndal (yellow card) 24'	Stadium: Linzer Stadion; Attendance: 12,855; Referee: Srđan Jovanović (Serbia)

===== Round of 16 =====
12 March 2020 First leg	LASK (Austria)	0–5	(England) Manchester United	Linz, Austria
18:55 CET (UTC+1)	Trauner (yellow card) 33'; Klauss (yellow card) 39'; Ramsebner (yellow card) 59'; Reiter (yellow card) 90'	Report	Ighalo 28'; Shaw (yellow card) 47'; James 58'; Mata 82'; Greenwood 90+2'; Pereira 90+3'	Stadium: Linzer Stadion; Attendance: 0 Referee: Artur Soares Dias (Portugal)

5 August 2020 Second leg	Manchester United (England)	2–1 (7–1 agg.)	(Austria) LASK	Manchester, England
21:00 CEST (UTC+2)	McTominay (yellow card) 39'; Lingard 57'; Martial 88'	Report	Michorl (yellow card) 35'; Wiesinger 55'	Stadium: Old Trafford; Attendance: 0 Referee: Anastasios Sidiropoulos (Greece)
Note: The match originally scheduled to be played on 19 March 2020, was indefinitely postponed following the suspension of UEFA competitions due to a COVID-19 pandemic in Europe. It was rescheduled on 17 June to 5 August.
