= 2020–21 LASK season =

LASK
2020–21 season
- Chairman: Siegmund Gruber
- Manager: Valérien Ismaël
- Stadium: Waldstadion; Linzer Stadion
- Austrian Bundesliga: 4th
- Austrian Cup: Runners-up
- UEFA Europa League: Group stage
- Top goalscorer: League: Johannes Eggestein (12); All: Johannes Eggestein (20)
Home colours	Away colours	Third colours

The 2020–21 season was the 113th season in the existence of LASK and the club's fourth consecutive season in the top flight of Austrian football. In addition to the domestic league, LASK participated in this season's editions of the Austrian Cup and participated in the UEFA Europa League. The season covered the period from 1 August 2020 to 30 June 2021.

== Players ==
=== First-team squad ===
As of 8 October 2020

Note: Flags indicate national team as defined under FIFA eligibility rules; some limited exceptions apply. Players may hold more than one non-FIFA nationality.

No.	Pos.	Nation	Player
1	GK	AUT	Alexander Schlager
5	DF	CRO	Petar Filipović
6	DF	AUT	Philipp Wiesinger
7	MF	AUT	Rene Renner
9	FW	FRA	Mamoudou Karamoko
10	MF	AUT	Peter Michorl
11	MF	AUT	Dominik Reiter
13	MF	GER	Johannes Eggestein (loan from Werder)
14	MF	AUT	Husein Balić
15	DF	AUT	Christian Ramsebner
16	DF	AUT	Marvin Potzmann
17	FW	AUT	Andreas Gruber
18	DF	AUT	Gernot Trauner
19	MF	AUT	Valentino Müller

No.	Pos.	Nation	Player
20	MF	AUT	Patrick Plojer
21	MF	DEN	Mads Emil Madsen
22	DF	UKR	Yevhen Cheberko
23	MF	AUT	Stefan Haudum
24	GK	NGR	Tobias Lawal
25	MF	AUS	James Holland
26	DF	AUT	Reinhold Ranftl
27	MF	AUT	Thomas Goiginger
29	FW	AUT	Marko Raguž
30	MF	PAN	Andrés Andrade
31	MF	AUT	Lukas Grgic
33	FW	AUT	Thomas Sabitzer
36	GK	AUT	Thomas Gebauer

=== Out on loan ===
Note: Flags indicate national team as defined under FIFA eligibility rules; some limited exceptions apply. Players may hold more than one non-FIFA nationality.

No.	Pos.	Nation	Player
—	DF	GER	Jan Boller (at FC Juniors OÖ until 30 June 2021)
—	MF	ISR	Yoav Hofmayster (at Ironi Kiryat Shmona until 30 June 2021)
—	MF	GER	Daniel Jelisić (at FC Juniors OÖ until 30 June 2021)

== Pre-season and friendlies ==
Win Draw Loss Fixtures

29 July 2020 Friendly	LASK	0–2	FK Senica	Pasching, Austria
16:00 CEST (UTC+2)		Report	Fotr 76'; Buchel 87'	Stadium: Raiffeisen Arena; Attendance: 0

19 August 2020 Friendly	LASK	1–4	Werder Bremen	Zell am Ziller, Austria
17:00 CEST (UTC+2)	Raguž 56' (pen.)	Report	Selke 5'; Eggestein 16'; Sargent 47'; Osako 77'	Stadium: Parkstadion Zell am Ziller; Attendance: 500; Referee: Walter Altmann

22 August 2020 Friendly	LASK	0–2	Karlsruher SC	Pasching, Austria
17:00 CEST (UTC+2)		Report	Hofmann 45'; Djuricin 85'	Stadium: Raiffeisen Arena; Attendance: 0

22 August 2020 Friendly	LASK	Cancelled	Würzburger Kickers	Pasching, Austria
19:00 CEST (UTC+2)				Stadium: Raiffeisen Arena

5 September 2020 Friendly	LASK	1–1	Jahn Regensburg	Pasching, Austria
16:00 CEST (UTC+2)	Holland 51'	Report	Albers 33'	Stadium: Raiffeisen Arena; Attendance: 0

== Competitions ==
=== Overview ===
Competition	First match	Last match	Starting round	Final position	Record							
Competition	First match	Last match	Starting round	Final position	Pld	W	D	L	GF	GA	GD	Win %
Austrian Football Bundesliga	11 September 2020	22 May 2021	Matchday 1	4th	32	15	6	11	55	41	+14	46.88
Austrian Cup	29 August 2020	1 May 2021	First round	Runners-up	6	5	0	1	15	6	+9	83.33
UEFA Europa League	24 September 2020	10 December 2020	Third qualifying round	Group stage	8	5	1	2	22	13	+9	62.50
Total					46	25	7	14	92	60	+32	54.35

Last updated: 22 May 2021
Source: Soccerway

=== Austrian Bundesliga ===
==== Regular stage ====
Pos	Team	Pld	W	D	L	GF	GA	GD	Pts	Qualification
1	Red Bull Salzburg	22	17	1	4	67	24	+43	52	Qualification for the Championship round
2	Rapid Wien	22	13	6	3	43	25	+18	45	Qualification for the Championship round
3	LASK	22	13	3	6	42	21	+21	42	Qualification for the Championship round
4	Sturm Graz	22	11	6	5	34	20	+14	39	Qualification for the Championship round
5	Wolfsberger AC	22	10	3	9	40	39	+1	33	Qualification for the Championship round

Source: Austrian Football Bundesliga
Rules for classification: 1) Points; 2) Goal difference; 3) Goals scored; 4) Matches won; 5) Away matches won; 6) Head-to-head points; 7) Head-to-head goal difference; 8) Head-to-head goals scored.

==== Results summary ====
Overall								Home						Away					
Pld	W	D	L	GF	GA	GD	Pts	W	D	L	GF	GA	GD	W	D	L	GF	GA	GD
22	13	3	6	42	21	+21	42	7	0	4	24	10	+14	6	3	2	18	11	+7

Last updated: 20 March 2021.
Source: Austrian Football Bundesliga

==== Results by round ====
Round	1	2	3	4	5	6	7	8	9	10	11	12	13	14	15	16	17	18	19	20	21	22
Ground	H	A	H	A	H	A	H	A	H	H	A	A	H	A	H	A	H	A	H	A	A	H
Result	W	D	W	L	W	W	W	D	W	W	L	D	L	W	L	W	W	W	L	W	W	L
Position	4	4	3	5	3	3	3	2	2	1	2	3	4	4	4	4	3	3	3	3	3	3

Updated to match(es) played on 20 March 2021. Source: Austrian Football Bundesliga
A = Away; H = Home; W = Win; D = Draw; L = Loss

==== Matches ====
The league fixtures were announced on 9 July 2020.

11 September 2020 1	LASK	1–0	Austria Wien	Pasching
20:30 CEST (UTC+2)	Renner (yellow card) 8'; Wiesinger (yellow card) 25'; Gruber 43'; Michorl (yellow card) 65'	Report	Zwierschitz (yellow card) 42'; Sax (yellow card) 58'; Martschinko (yellow card) 62'	Stadium: Raiffeisen Arena; Attendance: 6,400; Referee: Sebastian Gishamer

19 September 2020 2	WSG Tirol	1–1	LASK	Innsbruck
17:00 CEST (UTC+2)	Baden 5'; Oswald (yellow card) 31'; Hager (yellow card) 38'; Gugganig (yellow card) 59'	Report	Raguž 39' (pen.)	Stadium: Tivoli Stadion Tirol; Attendance: 950; Referee: Alexander Harkam

27 September 2020 3	LASK	3–1	Wolfsberger AC	Pasching
17:00 CEST (UTC+2)	Balić 26'; Raguž 55' (pen.); Trauner 78'	Report	Baumgartner 73'	Stadium: Raiffeisen Arena; Attendance: 3,228; Referee: Harald Lechner

4 October 2020 4	Rapid Wien	3–0	LASK	Vienna
17:00 CEST (UTC+2)	Murg 7'; Fountas 22'; Kara 90+3'	Report		Stadium: Allianz Stadion; Attendance: 3,000; Referee: Markus Hameter

25 October 2020 5	LASK	4–0	St. Pölten	Pasching
14:30 CET (UTC+1)	Gruber 34'; Ranftl 46'; Grgic 56'; Goiginger 87'	Report		Stadium: Raiffeisen Arena; Attendance: 3,233; Referee: Rene Eisner

1 November 2020 6	Sturm Graz	0–2	LASK	Graz
17:00 CET (UTC+1)		Report	Balić 6'; Eggestein 90+3'	Stadium: Merkur-Arena; Attendance: 0 Referee: Julian Weinberger

8 November 2020 7	LASK	4–0	Admira Wacker Mödling	Pasching
14:30 CET (UTC+1)	Trauner 16'; Eggestein 52'; Ranftl 62'; Grgic 70'	Report		Stadium: Raiffeisen Arena; Attendance: 0 Referee: Andreas Heiß

21 November 2020 8	Hartberg	1–1	LASK	Hartberg
17:00 CET (UTC+1)	Luckeneder 53'	Report	Filipović 21'	Stadium: Profertil Arena Hartberg; Attendance: 0 Referee: Alan Kijas

29 November 2020 9	LASK	3–0	Rheindorf Altach	Linz
14:30 CET (UTC+1)	Eggestein 65', 71'; Karamoko 90'	Report		Stadium: Linzer Stadion; Attendance: 0 Referee: Markus Hameter

6 December 2020 10	LASK	3–0	Ried	Linz
17:00 CET (UTC+1)	Goiginger 22'; Eggestein 45'; Reiter 86'	Report		Stadium: Linzer Stadion; Attendance: 0 Referee: Walter Altmann

13 December 2020 11	Red Bull Salzburg	3–1	LASK	Wals-Siezenheim
17:00 CET (UTC+1)	Ramalho (yellow card) 23'; Daka 54'; Berisha 62'; Camara (yellow card) 70'; Vallci (yellow card) 82'; Mwepu 90+3'	Report	Wiesinger (yellow card) 16'; Eggestein 28'; Gruber (yellow card) 49'; Michorl (yellow card) 63'; Madsen (yellow card) 78'; Goiginger (yellow card) 84'	Stadium: Stadion Wals-Siezenheim; Attendance: 0 Referee: Harald Lechner

20 December 2020 12	Austria Wien	1–1	LASK	Vienna
17:00 CET (UTC+1)	Pichler 13'	Report	Goiginger 22'	Stadium: Generali Arena; Attendance: 0 Referee: Christian-Petru Ciochirca

24 January 2021 13	LASK	2–4	WSG Tirol	Pasching
17:00 CET (UTC+1)	Michorl 25'; Holland 43'	Report	Gugganig 29'; Baden 37', 42'; Yeboah 70' (pen.)	Stadium: Raiffeisen Arena; Attendance: 0 Referee: Alan Kijas

27 January 2021 14	Wolfsberger AC	0–3	LASK	Wolfsberg
20:30 CET (UTC+1)		Report	Gruber 50', 60'; Holland 79'	Stadium: Lavanttal-Arena; Attendance: 0 Referee: Alexander Harkam

31 January 2021 15	LASK	1–2	Rapid Wien	Pasching
17:00 CET (UTC+1)	Holland 21'	Report	Grahovac 19'; Knasmüllner 23'	Stadium: Raiffeisen Arena; Attendance: 0 Referee: Walter Altmann

10 February 2021 16	St. Pölten	1–3	LASK	Sankt Pölten
18:30 CET (UTC+1)	Luxbacher (yellow card) 41'; Muhamedbegovic 65'	Report	Michorl 10', 83'; Wiesinger 33' (pen.); Andrade (yellow card) 76'; Trauner (yellow card) 76'	Stadium: NV Arena; Attendance: 0 Referee: Gerhard Grobelnik

14 February 2021 17	LASK	2–0	Sturm Graz	Pasching
17:00 CET (UTC+1)	Eggestein 45'; Michorl (yellow card) 81'; Balić 84'	Report	Geyrhofer (yellow card) 54'; Gazibegović (yellow card) 80'	Stadium: Raiffeisen Arena; Attendance: 0 Referee: Harald Lechner

21 February 2021 18	Admira Wacker Mödling	1–2	LASK	Maria Enzersdorf
14:30 CET (UTC+1)	Atanga (yellow card) 45+2'; Leitner (yellow card) 87'; Auer (yellow card) 88'; Kronberger 90'	Report	Gruber 9'; Trauner (yellow card) 31'; Wiesinger (yellow card) 41'; Michorl (yellow card) 55'; Andrade (yellow card) 60'; Goiginger 86'	Stadium: BSFZ-Arena; Attendance: 0 Referee: Josef Spurney

27 February 2021 19	LASK	1–2	Hartberg	Pasching
17:00 CET (UTC+1)	Eggestein 4'; Ranftl (yellow card) 60'	Report	Chabbi 23'; Horvath 26'; Nimaga (yellow card) 33'; Rep (yellow card) 60'	Stadium: Raiffeisen Arena; Attendance: 0 Referee: Felix Ouschan

6 March 2021 20	Rheindorf Altach	0–1	LASK	Altach
17:00 CET (UTC+1)	Subotić (yellow card) 47'; Anderson (yellow card) 90+2'	Report	Subotić 30' (o.g.); Potzmann (yellow card) 31'; Renner (yellow card) 56'	Stadium: Stadion Schnabelholz; Attendance: 0 Referee: Walter Altmann

14 March 2021 21	Ried	0–3	LASK	Ried im Innkreis
17:00 CET (UTC+1)	Grüll (penalty missed) 16'; Meisl (yellow card) 37'	Report	Andrade (yellow card) 17'; Renner 31', 54'; Trauner 76'	Stadium: Keine Sorgen Arena; Attendance: 0 Referee: Oliver Drachta

20 March 2021 22	LASK	0–1	Red Bull Salzburg	Pasching
17:00 CET (UTC+1)	Holland (yellow card) 47'	Report	Daka 13'; Ramalho (yellow card) 90+4'	Stadium: Raiffeisen Arena; Attendance: 0 Referee: Markus Hameter

==== Championship round ====
Pos	Team	Pld	W	D	L	GF	GA	GD	Pts	Qualification	RBS	RWI	STU	LIN	WOL	WAT
2	Rapid Wien	32	17	8	7	64	40	+24	36	Qualification for the Champions League second qualifying round	0–3	—	0–0	3–0	1–2	4–0
3	Sturm Graz	32	16	8	8	52	34	+18	36	Qualification for the Europa League play-off round	1–3	4–1	—	3–1	0–1	3–2
4	LASK	32	15	6	11	55	41	+14	30	Qualification for the Europa Conference League third qualifying round	2–5	1–1	0–0	—	2–1	3–3
5	Wolfsberger AC	32	13	5	14	52	62	−10	27	Qualification for the Europa Conference League play-off final	1–2	1–8	1–3	0–4	—	2–0
6	WSG Tirol	32	10	8	14	53	60	−7	23		3–2	2–3	2–3	2–0	2–2	—

Legend: Blue = home team win; Yellow = draw; Red = away team win.
Rules for classification: 1) Points; 2) Points with (possible) half points subtracted due to rounding; 3) Goal difference; 4) Goals scored; 5) Matches won; 6) Away matches won; 7) Head-to-head points; 8) Head-to-head goal difference; 9) Head-to-head goals scored.

==== Results summary ====
Overall								Home						Away					
Pld	W	D	L	GF	GA	GD	Pts	W	D	L	GF	GA	GD	W	D	L	GF	GA	GD
32	15	6	11	55	41	+14	51	8	3	5	32	20	+12	7	3	6	23	21	+2

Last updated: 22 May 2021.
Source: Austrian Football Bundesliga

==== Results by round ====
Round	1	2	3	4	5	6	7	8	9	10
Ground	A	H	A	H	A	H	H	A	H	A
Result	L	W	L	D	L	D	D	W	L	L
Position	3	3	3	3	4	4	4	4	4	4

Updated to match(es) played on 22 May 2021. Source: Austrian Football Bundesliga
A = Away; H = Home; W = Win; D = Draw; L = Loss

==== Matches ====
4 April 2021 23	WSG Tirol	2–0	LASK	Innsbruck
14:30 CEST (UTC+2)	Oswald (yellow card) 43'; Dedić 48'; Rogelj 59'	Report	Renner (yellow card) 32'; Wiesinger (penalty missed) 43'; Eggestein (yellow card) 57'	Stadium: Tivoli Stadion Tirol; Attendance: 0 Referee: Gerhard Grobelnik

11 April 2021 24	LASK	2–1	Wolfsberger AC	Pasching
14:30 CEST (UTC+2)	Filipović (yellow card) 11'; Ranftl 28'; Schlager (yellow card) 60'; Wiesinger 78' (pen.)	Report	Henriksson (yellow card) 27'; Röcher 70'	Stadium: Raiffeisen Arena; Attendance: 0 Referee: Christian-Petru Ciochirca

18 April 2021 25	Red Bull Salzburg	2–0	LASK	Wals-Siezenheim
14:30 CEST (UTC+2)	Berisha 87'; Okafor 90+3'	Report	Michorl (yellow card) 20'; Andrade (yellow card) 20'; Ranftl (yellow card) 29'; Renner (yellow card) 80'	Stadium: Stadion Wals-Siezenheim; Attendance: 0 Referee: Alexander Harkam

21 April 2021 26	LASK	1–1	Rapid Wien	Pasching
20:30 CEST (UTC+2)	Eggestein (yellow card) 11'; Goiginger (yellow card) 52', (goal) 63'; Wiesinger (yellow card) 76'; Sabitzer (yellow card) 90+2'	Report	Hofmann (yellow card) 67'; Knasmüllner 71'	Stadium: Raiffeisen Arena; Attendance: 0 Referee: Sebastian Gishamer

25 April 2021 27	Sturm Graz	3–1	LASK	Graz
17:00 CEST (UTC+2)	Nemeth 29'; Jantscher 45' (pen.), (yellow card) 86'; Yeboah 54' (pen.)	Report	Wiesinger (yellow card) 45'; Potzmann 86'; Reiter (yellow card) 90'	Stadium: Merkur-Arena; Attendance: 0 Referee: Christopher Jäger

28 April 2021 28	LASK	0–0	Sturm Graz	Pasching
18:30 CEST (UTC+2)		Report	Geyrhofer (yellow card) 65'; Jantscher (yellow card) 77'; Dante (yellow card) 78'; Stanković (yellow card) 88'	Stadium: Raiffeisen Arena; Attendance: 0 Referee: Alan Kijas

9 May 2021 29	LASK	3–3	WSG Tirol	Pasching
14:30 CEST (UTC+2)	Trauner (yellow card) 31' (yellow-red card) 82', (goal) 79'; Eggestein 33'; Goiginger 54'; Filipović (yellow card) 63'	Report	Filipović 24' (o.g.); Frederiksen 70' (pen.), 84' (pen.); Schnegg (yellow card) 86'	Stadium: Raiffeisen Arena; Attendance: 0 Referee: Felix Ouschan

12 May 2021 30	Wolfsberger AC	0–4	LASK	Wolfsberg
18:30 CEST (UTC+2)		Report	Eggestein 18', 61' (pen.); Ranftl 26'; Reiter 90+2'	Stadium: Lavanttal-Arena; Attendance: 0 Referee: Josef Spurny

16 May 2021 31	LASK	2–5	Red Bull Salzburg	Pasching
17:00 CEST (UTC+2)	Eggestein 19', (penalty missed) 71'; Michorl (yellow card) 26'; Reiter 84'	Report	Mwepu 20'; Okafor 21'; Daka 44'; Bernède (yellow card) 65' (yellow-red card) 74'; Adeyemi 67', 71'; Kristensen (yellow card) 70'	Stadium: Raiffeisen Arena; Attendance: 0 Referee: Harald Lechner

22 May 2021 32	Rapid Wien	3–0	LASK	Vienna
17:00 CEST (UTC+2)	Hofmann (yellow card) 35'; Fountas 47'; Knasmüllner 73', 90+5'	Report	Balić (yellow card) 6'; Renner (yellow card) 26'	Stadium: Allianz Stadion; Attendance: 0 Referee: Sebastian Gishamer

=== Austrian Cup ===
29 August 2020 First round	Siegendorf	0–3	LASK	Wiener Neustadt
20:30 CEST (UTC+2)		Report	Gruber 54'; Balić 73'; Raguž 89'	Stadium: Stadion Wiener Neustadt; Attendance: 0 Referee: Markus Hameter

17 October 2020 Second round	LASK	3–0	Wörgl	Pasching
17:00 CEST (UTC+2)	Eggestein 29'; Gruber 90+1'; Michorl 90+3'	Report		Stadium: Raiffeisen Arena; Attendance: 0 Referee: Alan Kijas

16 December 2020 Third round	LASK	3–0	ASK Elektra	Linz
18:00 CET (UTC+1)	Eggestein 2', 15', 34'	Report		Stadium: Linzer Stadion; Attendance: 0 Referee: Markus Hameter

7 February 2021 Quarter-finals	LASK	5–3 (a.e.t.)	SK Austria Klagenfurt	Linz
17:00 CET (UTC+1)	Eggestein 68', 102'; Balić 70', 98'; Potzmann 111'	Report	Rusek 5'; Hadžić 90+2'; Jaritz 108'	Stadium: Linzer Stadion; Attendance: 0 Referee: Rene Eisner

3 March 2021 Semi-finals	Wolfsberger AC	0–1 (a.e.t.)	LASK	Wolfsberg
17:00 CET (UTC+1)		Report	Wiesinger 97' (pen.)	Stadium: Lavanttal-Arena; Attendance: 0 Referee: Sebastian Gishamer

1 May 2021 Final	LASK	0–3	Red Bull Salzburg	Klagenfurt
20:30 CEST (UTC+2)	Trauner (yellow card) 43'; Holland (yellow card) 57'; Schlager (yellow card) 69'	Report	Berisha 45'; Aaronson 66'; Daka (penalty missed) 70'; Ulmer (yellow card) 70'; Wöber (yellow card) 82'; Mwepu 88'	Stadium: Wörthersee Stadion; Attendance: 0 Referee: Walter Altmann

=== UEFA Europa League ===
==== Qualifying rounds ====
24 September 2020 Third qualifying round	LASK (Austria)	7–0	(Slovakia) DAC Dunajská Streda	Linz, Austria
20:30 CEST (UTC+2)	Raguž 6', 16'; Filipović 47'; Michorl 51'; Gruber 53'; Balić 55'; Sabitzer 77'	Report	Blackman (red card) 48'; Kružliak (yellow card) 86'	Stadium: Linzer Stadion; Attendance: 0 Referee: Jérôme Brisard (France)

1 October 2020 Play-off round	Sporting CP (Portugal)	1–4	(Austria) LASK	Lisbon, Portugal
21:00 WEST (UTC+1)	Neto (yellow card) 25'; Porro (yellow card) 36'; Tomás 42'; Coates (red card) 63'; Gonçalves (yellow card) 90+3'	Report	Trauner 14'; Michorl (yellow card) 20', (goal) 65'; Raguž 58'; Gruber 69'	Stadium: Estádio José Alvalade; Attendance: 0 Referee: Aleksei Kulbakov (Belarus)

==== Group stage ====
The group stage draw was held on 2 October 2020.

Pos	Team	Pld	W	D	L	GF	GA	GD	Pts	Qualification	TOT	ANT	LASK	LUD
1	(England) Tottenham Hotspur	6	4	1	1	15	5	+10	13	Advance to knockout phase	—	2–0	3–0	4–0
2	(Belgium) Antwerp	6	4	0	2	8	5	+3	12	Advance to knockout phase	1–0	—	0–1	3–1
3	(Austria) LASK	6	3	1	2	11	12	−1	10		3–3	0–2	—	4–3
4	(Bulgaria) Ludogorets Razgrad	6	0	0	6	7	19	−12	0		1–3	1–2	1–3	—

Source: UEFA
Rules for classification: Group stage tiebreakers

22 October 2020 1	Tottenham Hotspur (England)	3–0	(Austria) LASK	Tottenham, England
21:00 CEST (UTC+2)	Moura 18'; Andrade 27' (o.g.); Son 84'	Report	Michorl (yellow card) 45+2'	Stadium: Tottenham Hotspur Stadium; Attendance: 0 Referee: Mohammed Al-Hakim (Sweden)

29 October 2020 2	LASK (Austria)	4–3	(Bulgaria) Ludogorets Razgrad	Linz, Austria
18:55 CET (UTC+1)	Balić 2'; Gruber 12'; Wiesinger (yellow card) 17'; Grgic (yellow card) 27' (yellow-red card) 73'; Michorl (yellow card) 47'; Raguž 35'; Verdon 56' (o.g.)	Report	Moți (yellow card) 10'; Manu 15', 67', 74' (pen.); Tekpetey (yellow card) 43'; Badji (yellow card) 45'	Stadium: Linzer Stadion; Attendance: 1,487; Referee: Xavier Estrada Fernández (Spain)

5 November 2020 3	Antwerp (Belgium)	0–1	(Austria) LASK	Antwerp, Belgium
21:00 CET (UTC+1)	Verstraete (yellow card) 28'; Gerkens (yellow card) 75'; Ampomah (yellow card) 87'	Report	Holland (yellow card) 33' (yellow-red card) 68'; Ranftl (yellow card) 39'; Eggestein 55'; Schlager (yellow card) 90+4'	Stadium: Bosuilstadion; Attendance: 0 Referee: Yevhen Aranovskyi (Ukraine)

26 November 2020 4	LASK (Austria)	0–2	(Belgium) Antwerp	Linz, Austria
18:55 CET (UTC+1)	Trauner (red card) 50'; Goiginger (yellow card) 63'; Eggestein (yellow card) 73'	Report	Hongla (yellow card) 28'; Haroun (yellow card) 48'; Refaelov 53'; Gerkens 83'	Stadium: Linzer Stadion; Attendance: 0 Referee: Donatas Rumšas (Lithuania)

3 December 2020 5	LASK (Austria)	3–3	(England) Tottenham Hotspur	Linz, Austria
18:55 CET (UTC+1)	Michorl (yellow card) 33', (goal) 42'; Andrade (yellow card) 45+1'; Karamoko (yellow card) 80', (goal) 90+3'; Eggestein 84'; Wiesinger (yellow card) 86'	Report	Moura (yellow card) 25'; Bale 45+2' (pen.); Son 56'; Alli 86' (pen.), (yellow card) 88'	Stadium: Linzer Stadion; Attendance: 0 Referee: Paweł Raczkowski (Poland)

10 December 2020 6	Ludogorets Razgrad (Bulgaria)	1–3	(Austria) LASK	Razgrad, Bulgaria
21:00 CET (UTC+1)	Cicinho (yellow card) 44'; Manu 46'; Santana (red card) 61'	Report	Goiginger (penalty missed) 45'; Wiesinger (yellow card) 54', (goal) 56'; Renner 61' (pen.); Balić (yellow card) 63'; Madsen 67'; Ramsebner (yellow card) 90+1'	Stadium: Huvepharma Arena; Attendance: 0 Referee: Vitali Meshkov (Russia)

== Statistics ==
=== Goalscorers ===
As of 8 November 2020

Rank	No.	Pos	Nat	Name	Austrian Bundesliga	Austrian Cup	Europa League	Total
1	17	FW	(Austria)	Andreas Gruber	2	2	3	7
1	29	FW	(Austria)	Marko Raguž	2	1	4	7
2	14	MF	(Austria)	Husein Balić	2	1	2	5
3	13	MF	(Germany)	Johannes Eggestein	2	1	1	4
4	18	DF	(Austria)	Gernot Trauner	2	0	1	3
4	10	MF	(Austria)	Peter Michorl	0	1	2	3
5	26	DF	(Austria)	Reinhold Ranftl	2	0	0	2
5	31	MF	(Austria)	Lukas Grgic	2	0	0	2
6	5	DF	(Croatia)	Petar Filipović	0	0	1	1
6	27	MF	(Austria)	Thomas Goiginger	1	0	0	1
6	33	FW	(Austria)	Thomas Sabitzer	0	0	1	1
Own goal					0	0	1	1
Totals					15	6	16	37
