= 2021–22 LASK season =

LASK
2021–22 season
- President: Siegmund Gruber
- Head coach: Dominik Thalhammer
- Stadium: Waldstadion
- Austrian Bundesliga: 8th
- Austrian Cup: Quarter-finals
- UEFA Europa Conference League: Round of 16
- Top goalscorer: League: Thomas Goiginger; Sascha Horvath (7 each); All: Thomas Goiginger; Sascha Horvath (11 each)
Home colours	Away colours

The 2021–22 season was the 114th season in the existence of LASK and the club's fifth consecutive season in the top flight of Austrian football. In addition to the domestic league, LASK participated in this season's editions of the Austrian Cup and the UEFA Europa Conference League.

== Players ==
=== First-team squad ===
As of 5 February 2022

Note: Flags indicate national team as defined under FIFA eligibility rules; some limited exceptions apply. Players may hold more than one non-FIFA nationality.

No.	Pos.	Nation	Player
1	GK	AUT	Alexander Schlager
3	DF	CIV	Oumar Sako
4	DF	FRA	Yannis Letard
5	DF	CRO	Petar Filipović
6	DF	AUT	Philipp Wiesinger
7	MF	AUT	Rene Renner
8	MF	AUT	Peter Michorl
10	FW	AUT	Marko Raguž
13	DF	CYP	Strahinja Kerkez
14	FW	AUT	Husein Balić
17	FW	AUT	Andreas Gruber
18	MF	SRB	Branko Jovičić
19	DF	AUT	Marvin Potzmann
21	MF	KOR	Hong Hyun-seok
23	FW	AUT	Alexander Schmidt

No.	Pos.	Nation	Player
24	GK	AUT	Tobias Lawal
25	MF	AUS	James Holland
26	DF	CZE	Filip Twardzik
27	FW	AUT	Thomas Goiginger
28	FW	SVK	Adam Griger
29	MF	AUT	Florian Flecker
30	MF	AUT	Sascha Horvath
32	DF	SUI	Enrique Wild
33	DF	AUT	Felix Luckeneder
34	DF	GER	Jan Boller
35	MF	AUT	Stefan Radulovic
36	GK	AUT	Thomas Gebauer
38	FW	JPN	Keito Nakamura
44	DF	AUT	Dario Marešić (on loan from Stade Reims)

=== Out on loan ===
Note: Flags indicate national team as defined under FIFA eligibility rules; some limited exceptions apply. Players may hold more than one non-FIFA nationality.

No.	Pos.	Nation	Player
—	DF	PAN	Andrés Andrade (at Arminia Bielefeld until 30 June 2022)
—	MF	ISR	Yoav Hofmayster (at Maccabi Petah Tikva until 30 June 2022)
—	MF	AUT	Patrick Plojer (at Blau-Weiß Linz until 30 June 2022)
—	FW	AUT	Tobias Anselm (at WSG Tirol until 30 June 2022)

No.	Pos.	Nation	Player
—	FW	AUT	Thomas Sabitzer (at WSG Tirol until 30 June 2022)
—	FW	PER	Matías Succar (at FK Teplice until 30 June 2022)
—	FW	AUT	Christoph Monschein (at SCR Altach until 30 June 2022)

== Pre-season and friendlies ==
Win Draw Loss Fixtures

27 June 2021 Friendly	Ludogorets Razgrad (Bulgaria)	3–0	(Austria) LASK	Mondsee, Austria
17:00 CEST (UTC+2)				Stadium: BWT Arena Mondseeland

3 July 2021 Friendly	LASK (Austria)	3–0	(Russia) Dynamo Moscow	Pregarten, Austria
17:00 CEST (UTC+2)				Stadium: Kornspitz-Arena

10 July 2021 Friendly	LASK (Austria)	1–0	(Germany) 1. FC Heidenheim	Pasching, Austria
17:00 CEST (UTC+2)	Michorl 56' (pen.)	Report		Stadium: Waldstadion

15 January 2022 Friendly	LASK (Austria)	7–1	(Austria) Grazer AK	Pasching, Austria
13:30 CET (UTC+1)				Stadium: Waldstadion

22 January 2022 Friendly	Maribor (Slovenia)	2–1	(Austria) LASK	Belek, Turkey
15:00 CET (UTC+1)

28 January 2022 Friendly	LASK (Austria)	2–2	(Serbia) Mladost Lučani	Antalya, Turkey
09:00 CET (UTC+1)		Report		Stadium: Calista Sports Center

28 January 2022 Friendly	Red Star Belgrade (Serbia)	2–1	(Austria) LASK	Antalya, Turkey
15:00 CET (UTC+1)	Omoijuanfo 32'; Katai 39'		Balić 17'	Stadium: Calista Sports Center

== Competitions ==
=== Overall record ===
Competition	First match	Last match	Starting round	Final position	Record							
Competition	First match	Last match	Starting round	Final position	Pld	W	D	L	GF	GA	GD	Win %
Austrian Bundesliga	24 July 2021	23 May 2022	Matchday 1	8th	32	9	12	11	44	42	+2	28.13
Austrian Cup	17 July 2021	6 February 2022	First round	Quarter-finals	4	3	0	1	12	4	+8	75.00
UEFA Europa Conference League	5 August 2021	17 March 2022	Third qualifying round	Round of 16	12	9	2	1	27	10	+17	75.00
Total					48	21	14	13	83	56	+27	43.75

Source: Soccerway

=== Austrian Bundesliga ===
==== League table ====
Austrian Bundesliga regular season table
Pos	Team	Pld	W	D	L	GF	GA	GD	Pts	Qualification
6	Austria Klagenfurt	22	7	9	6	31	33	−2	30	Qualification for the Championship round
7	Ried	22	7	8	7	31	41	−10	29	Qualification for the Relegation round
8	LASK	22	6	7	9	28	29	−1	25	Qualification for the Relegation round
9	WSG Tirol	22	5	8	9	30	42	−12	23	Qualification for the Relegation round
10	Hartberg	22	5	7	10	29	35	−6	22	Qualification for the Relegation round

Source: Austrian Football Bundesliga
Rules for classification: 1) Points; 2) Head-to-head record; 3) Goal difference; 4) Goals scored; 5) Matches won; 6) Away matches won; 7) Away goals scored.

Pos	Team	Pld	W	D	L	GF	GA	GD	Pts	Qualification	RBS	STU	AWI	WOL	RWI	KLA
1	Red Bull Salzburg (C)	32	25	5	2	77	19	+58	52	Qualification for the Champions League group stage	—	1–0	5–0	4–0	2–1	1–1
2	Sturm Graz	32	16	8	8	62	46	+16	37	Qualification for the Champions League third qualifying round	2–1	—	1–0	1–4	2–1	3–1
3	Austria Wien	32	11	13	8	44	39	+5	29	Qualification for the Europa League play-off round	1–2	4–2	—	2–1	1–1	1–1
4	Wolfsberger AC	32	14	5	13	48	53	−5	28	Qualification for the Europa Conference League third qualifying round	1–4	0–2	1–1	—	2–1	1–2
5	Rapid Wien (O)	32	10	11	11	48	45	+3	25	Qualification for the Europa Conference League play-offs	0–1	1–1	1–1	2–1	—	2–2
6	Austria Klagenfurt	32	8	12	12	43	57	−14	21		0–6	1–2	1–2	2–3	1–3	—

Legend: Blue = home team win; Yellow = draw; Red = away team win.
Rules for classification: 1) Points; 2) Points with (possible) half points subtracted due to rounding; 3) Head-to-head points; 4) Head-to-head goal difference; 5) Head-to-head goals scored; 6) Head-to-head away goals scored; 7) Goal difference; 8) Goals scored; 9) Matches won; 10) Away matches won; 11) Away goals scored.
(C) Champions; (O) Play-off winners

Austrian Bundesliga relegation round table
Pos	Team	Pld	W	D	L	GF	GA	GD	Pts	Qualification	WAT	LIN	ALT	RIE	HAR	ADM
1	WSG Tirol	32	10	10	12	46	58	−12	28	Qualification for the Europa Conference League play-offs	—	4–0	0–3	2–0	4–2	0–0
2	LASK	32	9	12	11	44	42	+2	26	Qualification for the Europa Conference League play-offs	6–0	—	2–1	0–2	3–3	3–1
3	Rheindorf Altach	32	7	8	17	24	49	−25	22		2–1	0–0	—	1–1	0–0	2–2
4	Ried	32	8	13	11	40	54	−14	22		2–3	1–1	1–2	—	0–0	1–1
5	Hartberg	32	7	12	13	43	47	−4	22		0–1	0–0	4–0	1–1	—	1–2
6	Admira Wacker Mödling (R)	32	6	13	13	36	46	−10	21	Relegation to Austrian Football Second League	1–1	1–1	0–3	2–0	1–3	—

Source: Austrian Bundesliga
Legend: Blue = home team win; Yellow = draw; Red = away team win.
Rules for classification: 1) Points; 2) Points with (possible) half points subtracted due to rounding; 3) Head-to-head points; 4) Head-to-head goal difference; 5) Head-to-head goals scored; 6) Head-to-head away goals scored; 7) Goal difference; 8) Goals scored; 9) Matches won; 10) Away matches won; 11) Away goals scored.
(R) Relegated

==== Results summary ====
Overall								Home						Away					
Pld	W	D	L	GF	GA	GD	Pts	W	D	L	GF	GA	GD	W	D	L	GF	GA	GD
20	6	6	8	28	28	0	24	3	3	4	12	12	0	3	3	4	16	16	0

Last updated: 19 February 2022.
Source: Austrian Football Bundesliga

==== Results by round ====
Round	1	2	3
Ground	A	H	A
Result	W	D	
Position	4	3	

Updated to match(es) played on 21 November 2021. Source: Austrian Football Bundesliga
A = Away; H = Home; W = Win; D = Draw; L = Loss

==== Matches ====
The league fixtures were announced on 22 June 2021.

24 July 2021 1	Rheindorf Altach	0–1	LASK	Altach
17:00 CEST (UTC+2)				Stadium: Stadion Schnabelholz

31 July 2021 2	LASK	1–1	Rapid Wien	Pasching
17:00 CEST (UTC+2)				Stadium: Raiffeisen Arena

8 August 2021 3	WSG Tirol	1–1	LASK	Innsbruck
17:00 CEST (UTC+2)				Stadium: Tivoli Stadion Tirol

=== Austrian Cup ===
17 July 2021 First round	LASK	6–0	FC Mannsdorf-Großenzersdorf	Pasching
20:30 CEST (UTC+2)	Renner 6', 44'; Michorl 15'; Goiginger 49'; Balić 54'; Flecker 85'	Report		Stadium: Raiffeisen Arena; Referee: Sebastian Gishamer

23 September 2021 Second round	LASK	3–0	SV Stripfing	Pasching
17:00 CEST (UTC+2)	Flecker 42'; Grozdić 47' (o.g.); Michorl 90+5'	Report		Stadium: Raiffeisen Arena; Attendance: 0 Referee: Gerhard Grobelnik

28 October 2021 Third round	LASK	2–1	WSG Tirol	Pasching
18:00 CEST (UTC+2)	Horvath 30'; Michorl 34'	Report	Vrioni 49'	Stadium: Raiffeisen Arena; Attendance: 2,500; Referee: Gerhard Grobelnik

6 February 2022 Quarter-finals	Red Bull Salzburg	3–1	LASK	Wals-Siezenheim
16:30 CET (UTC+1)	Renner 15' (o.g.); Kristensen 41'; Capaldo 48'	Report	Horvath 13'	Stadium: Stadion Wals-Siezenheim; Attendance: 2,000; Referee: Walter Altmann

=== UEFA Europa Conference League ===
==== Third qualifying round ====
The draw for the third qualifying round was held on 19 July 2021.

5 August 2021 First leg	Vojvodina (Serbia)	0–1	(Austria) LASK	Novi Sad, Serbia
19:00 CEST (UTC+2)		Report	Michorl 70'	Stadium: Karađorđe Stadium; Referee: Michael Fabbri (Italy)

12 August 2021 Second leg	LASK (Austria)	6–1 (7–1 agg.)	(Serbia) Vojvodina	Klagenfurt, Austria
21:00 CEST (UTC+2)	Karamoko 34' (pen.), 53'; Goiginger 56'; Potzmann 67'; Balić 80'; Schmidt 87'	Report	Kabić 13'	Stadium: Wörthersee Stadion; Referee: Benoît Millot (France)

==== Play-off round ====
The draw for the play-off round was held on 2 August 2021.

19 August 2021 First leg	LASK (Austria)	1–1	(Scotland) St Johnstone	Klagenfurt, Austria
21:00 CEST (UTC+2)	Karamoko 60' (pen.)	Report	Kane 17'	Stadium: Wörthersee Stadion; Referee: Glenn Nyberg (Sweden)

26 August 2021 Second leg	St Johnstone (Scotland)	0–2 (1–3 agg.)	(Austria) LASK	Perth, Scotland
19:45 BST (UTC+1)		Report	Balić 72'; Raguž 85' (pen.)	Stadium: McDiarmid Park; Referee: Daniel Siebert (Germany)

==== Group stage ====
The draw for the group stage was held on 27 August 2021.

Pos	Team	Pld	W	D	L	GF	GA	GD	Pts	Qualification	LASK	MTA	HJK	ALA
1	(Austria) LASK	6	5	1	0	12	1	+11	16	Advance to round of 16	—	1–1	3–0	2–0
2	(Israel) Maccabi Tel Aviv	6	3	2	1	14	4	+10	11	Advance to knockout round play-offs	0–1	—	3–0	4–1
3	(Finland) HJK	6	2	0	4	5	15	−10	6		0–2	0–5	—	1–0
4	(Armenia) Alashkert	6	0	1	5	4	15	−11	1		0–3	1–1	2–4	—

Source: UEFA
Rules for classification: Group stage tiebreakers

16 September 2021 1	HJK (Finland)	0–2	(Austria) LASK	Helsinki, Finland
21:00 (22:00 EEST)		Report	Marešić 17'; Monschein 89'	Stadium: Bolt Arena; Attendance: 3,612; Referee: Kirill Levnikov (Russia)

30 September 2021 2	LASK (Austria)	1–1	(Israel) Maccabi Tel Aviv	Klagenfurt, Austria
18:45	Horvath 10'	Report	Shamir 88'	Stadium: Wörthersee Stadion; Attendance: 1,000; Referee: Mykola Balakin (Ukraine)

21 October 2021 3	Alashkert (Armenia)	0–3	(Austria) LASK	Yerevan, Armenia
18:45 (20:45 AMT)		Report	Hong 35'; Goiginger 68'; Michorl 90+2'	Stadium: Vazgen Sargsyan Republican Stadium; Attendance: 1,500; Referee: Jens Maae (Denmark)

4 November 2021 4	LASK (Austria)	2–0	(Armenia) Alashkert	Klagenfurt, Austria
18:45	Nakamura 12', 87'	Report		Stadium: Wörthersee Stadion; Attendance: 400; Referee: Mohammed Al-Hakim (Sweden)

25 November 2021 5	Maccabi Tel Aviv (Israel)	0–1	(Austria) LASK	Tel Aviv, Israel
21:00 (22:00 IST)		Report	Horvath 89'	Stadium: Bloomfield Stadium; Attendance: 12,203; Referee: Jérôme Brisard (France)

9 December 2021 6	LASK (Austria)	3–0	(Finland) HJK	Klagenfurt, Austria
18:45	Balić 41'; Nakamura 63'; Gruber 81'	Report		Stadium: Wörthersee Stadion; Referee: Igor Pajač (Croatia)

==== Knockout phase ====
===== Round of 16 =====
The round of 16 draw was held on 25 February 2022.

10 March 2022 First leg	Slavia Prague (Czech Republic)	4–1	(Austria) LASK	Prague, Czech Republic
18:45 GMT (UTC±0)	Sor 3', 29'; Olayinka 83'; Traoré 85'	Report	Balić 67'	Stadium: Sinobo Stadium; Referee: Andris Treimanis (Latvia)

17 March 2022 Second leg	LASK (Austria)	4–3 (5–7 agg.)	(Czech Republic) Slavia Prague	Sankt Pölten, Austria
21:00 CET (UTC+1)	Wiesinger 36', 76'; Gruber 88'; Schmidt 90'	Report	Olayinka 24'; Bah 37'; Sor 62'	Stadium: NV Arena (Note: LASK played their home match at NV Arena, Sankt Pölten, instead of their regular stadium Linzer Stadion, Linz, due to renovation.); Referee: Lawrence Visser (Belgium)
