= Gernot Trauner =

Austrian footballer (born 1992)

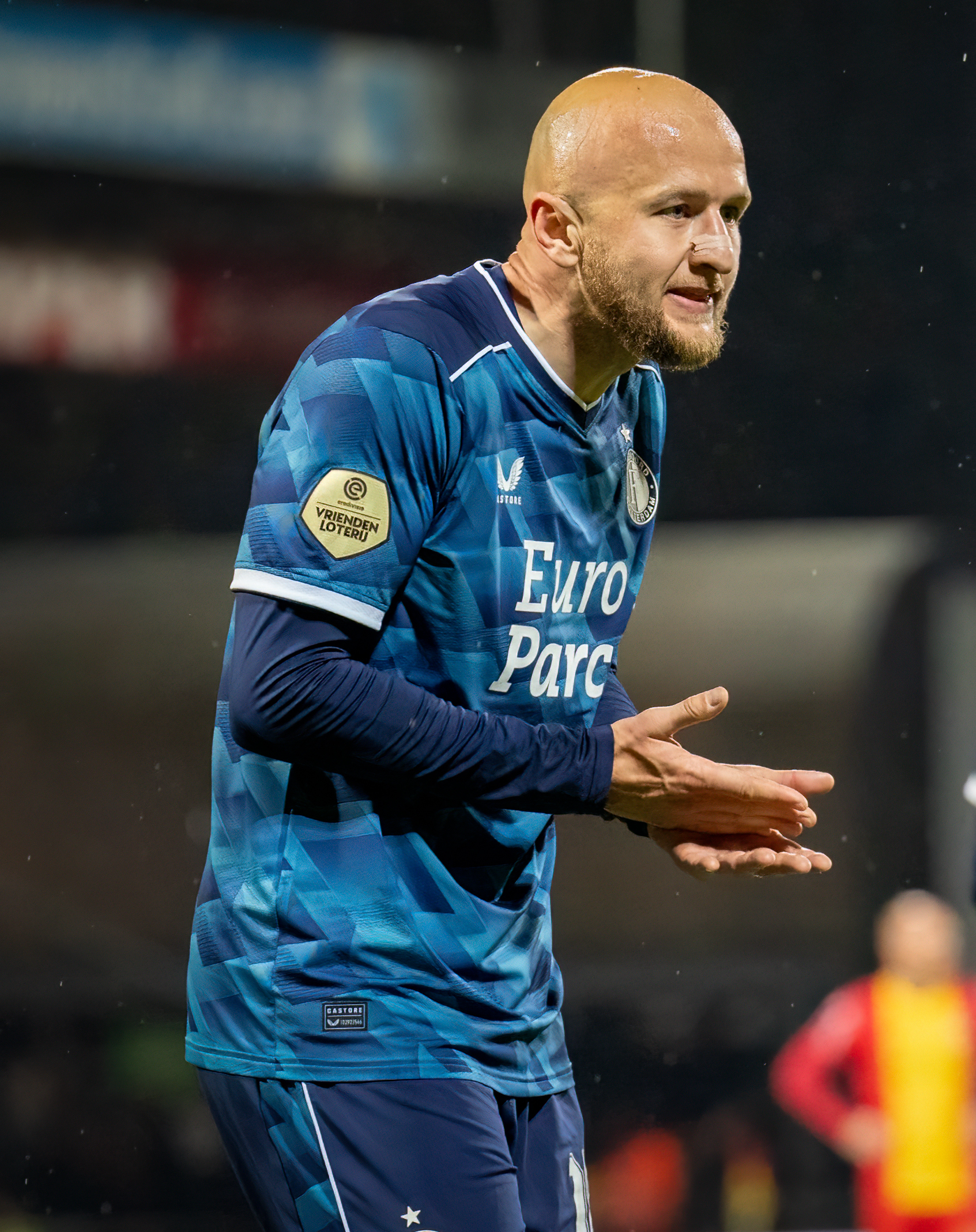
- Trauner with Feyenoord in 2024

Personal information
- Date of birth: 25 March 1992 (age 34)
- Place of birth: Linz, Austria
- Height: 1.83 m (6 ft 0 in)
- Position: Centre back

Youth career
- 1997–2006: SV Kematen am Innbach
- 2006–2010: AKA Linz

Senior career*
Years	Team	Apps	(Gls)
2010–2011	LASK II	8	(2)
2010–2012	LASK	13	(0)
2012–2017	Ried	104	(5)
2017–2021	LASK	116	(12)
2021–2026	Feyenoord	92	(1)

International career
2009–2010	Austria U18	5	(1)
2010	Austria U19	6	(1)
2012	Austria U21	3	(0)
2018–2025	Austria	16	(2)
- * Club domestic league appearances and goals

Gernot Trauner (German pronunciation: [ˈɡeːɐ̯noːt ˈtʁaʊ̯nɐ]; born 25 March 1992) is an Austrian former professional footballer who played as a centre-back.

Trauner progressed through different youth teams in Upper Austria, before making his debut in professional football as part of LASK in 2010. Sidelined by injury in the 2011–12 season, he made the move to SV Ried in 2012 where he made his breakthrough in the Austrian Bundesliga. He returned to LASK in 2017 under head coach Oliver Glasner where he grew into one of the best centre-backs in the league, and also experienced European success. In 2021, he joined Eredivisie club Feyenoord, where he reached the UEFA Europa Conference League final in his first season and was voted into the Team of the Season.

He made his debut for the Austria national team in 2018 in a friendly against Denmark.

== Club career ==
=== Early years ===
Trauner started playing football for SV Kematen am Innbach in the Hausruckviertel of Upper Austria in 1997. Described by his youth coach Karl Karazi as "agile and technically gifted" from early on, he was particularly praised for his ambition to succeed. He progressed through the different youth teams of the club until 2006, where he moved to regional football academy of Linz. He played there from under-15 to the under-19 level, winning the national under-17 championship with the team in the 2008–09 season.

=== LASK ===
After having impressed with the under-19s of the Linz academy, Trauner was signed by regional powerhouse LASK in February 2010. He initially played for the second team competing in the Upper Austrian Landesliga. He made his debut for this team in a 6–1 victory against SV Gmunden on 21 March 2010, scoring a goal. Teammates on his debut included Lukas Kragl, Thomas Höltschl and Ali Hamdemir. In his first season he made another ten appearances and scored three more goals. The reserve team won promotion to the Austrian Regionalliga Central at the end of the season with a second place.

Ahead of the 2010–11 season, Trauner was promoted to the LASK first team, making his Austrian Bundesliga debut under head coach Helmut Kraft as a substitute for René Aufhauser in a 1–0 regional derby loss to SV Ried on 31 July 2010. He made 10 more league appearances that season as his team suffered relegation to the First League, but would miss the entirety of the 2011–12 season with a complicated hip injury.

=== SV Ried ===
Trauner joined SV Ried on 12 June 2012, after his contract with LASK had expired. He signed a three-year contract. He made his competitive debut for the club on 1 September, coming off the bench in the 84th minute for Nacho Rodríguez in a 1–0 home loss to Sturm Graz.

He would suffer a zygomatic bone fracture in October 2013, again sidelining him for an extended period. However, he managed to establish himself as a starter for the club, switching from a position as central midfielder to centre-back under head coach Oliver Glasner.

On 7 March 2015, Trauner scored his first goal in the Austrian Bundesliga, a powerful shot from distance, to hand Ried a 2–1 victory against SV Grödig. In May 2015, he signed a contract extension with Ried until 2017.

Trauner suffered an anterior cruciate ligament injury in his right knee in April 2016, which meant that he missed large parts of the 2016–17 season. He returned to the pitch on 29 November 2016, after a six-month absence, coming on as a substitute in the second half for Clemens Walch in a 1–0 loss to Rheindorf Altach. The season ended with Ried suffering relegation to the second tier; their first relegation since 2003.

=== Return to LASK ===
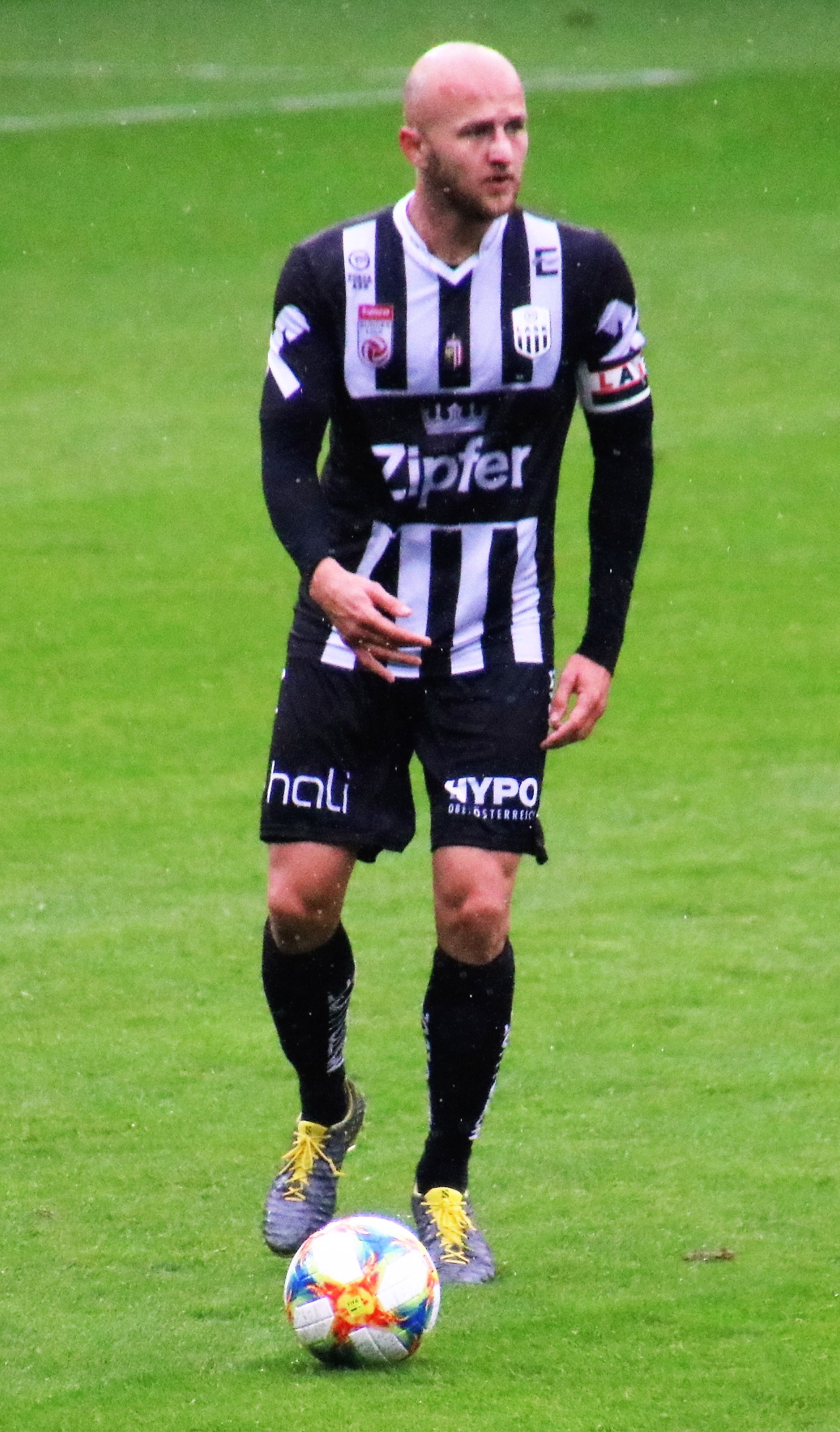
Trauner in action against Red Bull Salzburg in May 2019

On 29 May 2017, Trauner returned to LASK on a three-year contract, as the club had won promotion back to the Bundesliga. On 15 July, Trauner made his first competitive appearance for the club since his return, in the 1–0 win against FC Kitzbühel in the Austrian Cup. A week later he also played his first league game since his return, in a 3–0 victory against Admira Wacker. On 17 February 2018, Trauner scored his first goal for LASK, opening the score in a 2–0 win against Rheindorf Altach. The team finished fourth in the league table at the end of the season, and thus qualified for UEFA Europa League football.

For the 2018–19 season, Trauner was named team captain. Entering the second qualifying round of the Europa League, Trauner made his European debut in a 4–0 victory against Norwegian club Lillestrøm. LASK were eliminated in the third qualifying round on away goals by Turkish side Beşiktaş. He finished the season with three goals scored as LASK finished in second place in the Bundesliga.

In the play-off round of the UEFA Champions League against Club Brugge, Trauner was sent off after receiving two yellow cards and LASK were eliminated, allowing them to enter the group stage of the Europa League. On 12 December 2019, Trauner scored his first European goal, opening the score against Sporting CP in a 3–0 win. In the Round of 16, LASK were eliminated by Manchester United. In the 2019–20 season, LASK finished in fourth place in the Bundesliga, a result they repeated in the 2020–21 season. In the latter season, they were eliminated in the group stage of the Europa League and lost the final of the Austrian Cup to Red Bull Salzburg.

Trauner made 158 competitive appearances for the club during his second stint, scoring 17 goals.

=== Feyenoord ===
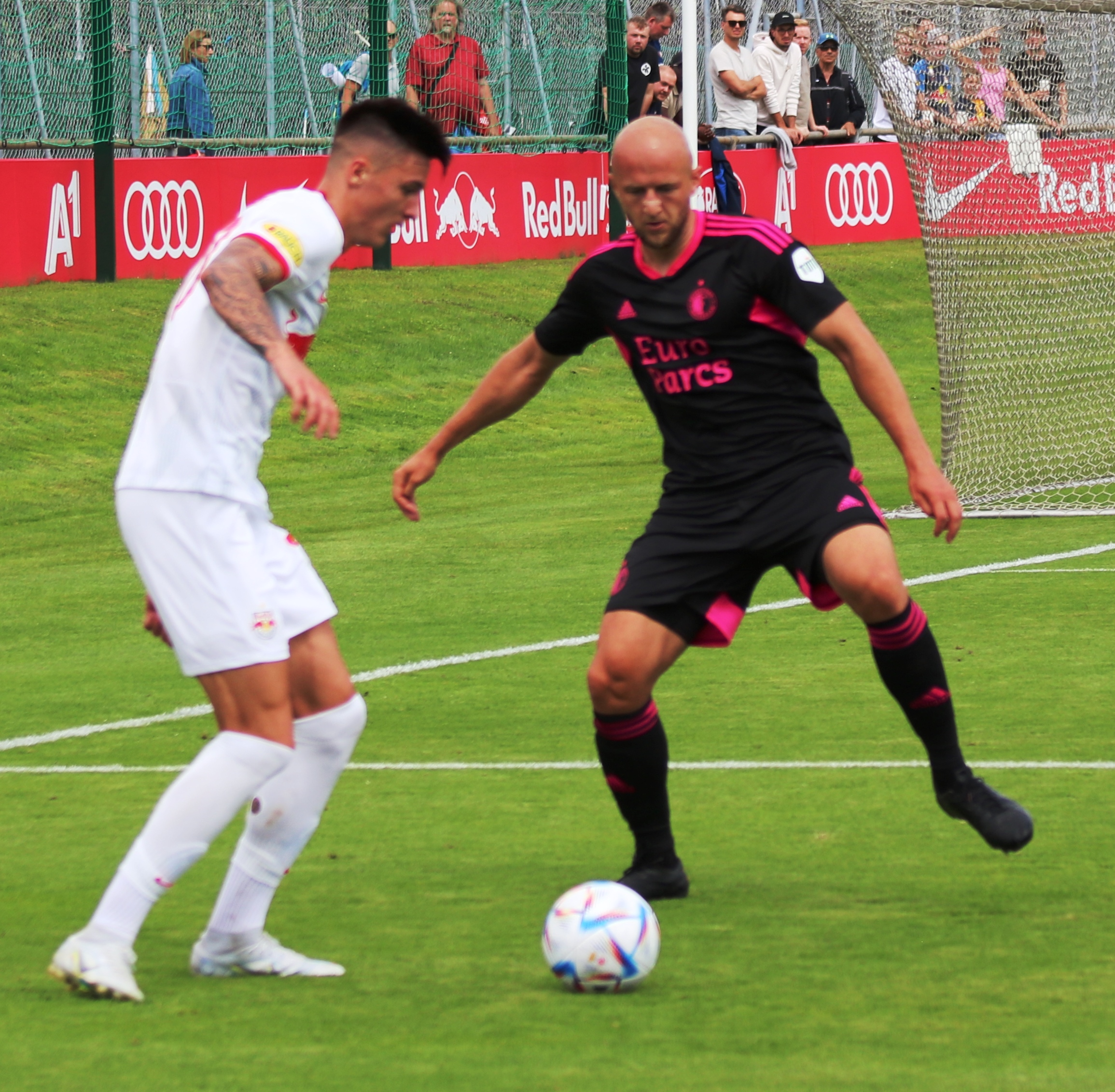
Trauner (right) playing for Feyenoord

Trauner joined Eredivisie club Feyenoord on 26 July 2021, for a reported fee of €1 million. He made his competitive debut for the club on 5 July, in a 3–0 away win against FC Luzern in the UEFA Europa Conference League. His home debut in the De Kuip followed in the return game a week later. On 15 August, Trauner made his Eredivisie debut in a 4–0 victory against Willem II. He held on to a place in the starting lineup throughout the season, as Feyenoord impressed in the first season under head coach Arne Slot, finishing third in the league table. Their main success, however, was in the UEFA Europa Conference League, where the club reached the final – the club's first European final since 2002. They were eventually beaten 1–0 in the final by José Mourinho's Roma. Trauner was voted into the Team of the Season of the inaugural tournament.

Following Jens Toornstra's departure, Feyenoord head coach Arne Slot chose Trauner as team captain for the league opener, a 5–2 win against Vitesse on 7 August 2022. His performance as captain was praised by pundit Emile Schelvis, who said he had "fought as a true captain" in RTV Rijnmond. In the end, long-time Feyenoord player Orkun Kökçü was made the new permanent club captain, with Trauner taking over duties as vice-captain. Trauner sustained a knee injury during practice on 22 December 2022 which required surgery, sidelining him for the following months. Feyenoord went on to win the 2022–23 Eredivisie, earning Trauner the first prize of his career.

Ahead of the 2023–24 season, Trauner was made the club's new captain after the departure of Orkun Kökçü.

Trauner announced his retirement from playing in August 2026.

== International career ==
Trauner has represented Austria at under-18, under-19 and under-21 level and was a member of the Austrian squad at the 2010 UEFA European Under-19 Championship, where he played in all three of Austria's games and scored against England.

He made his debut for the Austrian national team on 16 October 2018 in a friendly against Denmark. On 11 November 2020, he scored his first international goal in a 3–0 away friendly win against Luxembourg.

On 7 June 2024, he was named in the 26-man squad for the UEFA Euro 2024. On 21 June, he scored his country's first goal from a header in a 3–1 victory over Poland.

== Personal life ==
Trauner is married and has three children.

== Career statistics ==
=== Club ===
As of match played 17 May 2026

Appearances and goals by club, season and competition
Club	Season	League			National cup (Note: Includes Austrian Cup, KNVB Cup)		Europe		Total	
Club	Season	Division	Apps	Goals	Apps	Goals	Apps	Goals	Apps	Goals
LASK	2010–11	Austrian Bundesliga	13	0	2	0	—		15	0
LASK	2011–12	2. Liga	0	0	0	0	—		0	0
LASK	Total		13	0	2	0	—		15	0
Ried	2012–13	Austrian Bundesliga	15	0	2	0	—		17	0
Ried	2013–14	Austrian Bundesliga	21	0	2	0	—		23	0
Ried	2014–15	Austrian Bundesliga	29	1	2	0	—		31	1
Ried	2015–16	Austrian Bundesliga	29	4	2	0	—		31	4
Ried	2016–17	Austrian Bundesliga	10	0	—		—		10	0
Ried	Total		104	5	8	0	—		112	5
LASK	2017–18	Austrian Bundesliga	31	1	3	0	—		34	1
LASK	2018–19	Austrian Bundesliga	28	4	5	1	4 (Note: Appearances in UEFA Europa League)	0	37	5
LASK	2019–20	Austrian Bundesliga	28	3	4	1	13 (Note: Four appearances and one goal in UEFA Champions League, nine appearances and one goal in UEFA Europa League)	2	45	6
LASK	2020–21	Austrian Bundesliga	29	4	6	0	6	1	41	5
LASK	2021–22	Austrian Bundesliga	0	0	1	0	0	0	1	0
LASK	Total		116	12	19	2	23	3	158	17
Feyenoord	2021–22	Eredivisie	30	0	1	0	15 (Note: Appearances in UEFA Europa Conference League)	0	46	0
Feyenoord	2022–23	Eredivisie	19	0	0	0	7	0	26	0
Feyenoord	2023–24	Eredivisie	19	1	3	0	4 (Note: Appearances in UEFA Champions League)	0	26	1
Feyenoord	2024–25	Eredivisie	19	0	0	0	9	1	28	1
Feyenoord	2025–26	Eredivisie	5	0	—		—		5	0
Feyenoord	Total		92	1	4	0	35	1	131	2
Career total			325	18	33	2	58	4	416	24

=== International ===
As of match played 23 March 2025

Appearances and goals by national team and year
National team	Year	Apps	Goals
Austria	2018	1	0
Austria	2020	2	1
Austria	2021	2	0
Austria	2022	4	0
Austria	2023	1	0
Austria	2024	4	1
Austria	2025	1	0
Total		15	2

Scores and results list Austria's goal tally first, score column indicates score after each Trauner goal.

List of international goals scored by Gernot Trauner
No.	Date	Venue	Opponent	Score	Result	Competition
1.	11 November 2020	Stade Josy Barthel, Luxembourg, Luxembourg	Luxembourg	1–0	3–0	Friendly
2.	21 June 2024	Olympiastadion, Berlin, Germany	Poland	1–0	3–1	UEFA Euro 2024

== Honours ==
Feyenoord

- Eredivisie: 2022–23
- KNVB Cup: 2023–24
- UEFA Europa Conference League runner-up: 2021–22
- Johan Cruyff Shield: 2024

Individual

- Austrian Bundesliga Team of the Year: 2018–19 2019–20
- UEFA Europa Conference League Team of the Season: 2021–22
- Eredivisie Team of the Month: August 2022,
