= Enrique Wild =

Swiss footballer (born 1999)

Personal information
- Date of birth: 27 September 1999 (age 27)
- Place of birth: Frauenfeld, Switzerland
- Height: 1.76 m (5 ft 9 in)
- Position: Defender

Team information
- Current team: Kreuzlingen
- Number: 12

Youth career
- –2015: FC Wil
- 2015–2016: FC Tobel
- 2016: FC Zürich
- 2017–2018: FC Winterthur

Senior career*
Years	Team	Apps	(Gls)
2018–2020	FC Winterthur	36	(1)
2020–2021	Juniors OÖ	23	(1)
2021–2023	LASK	1	(0)
2022–2023	→ Juniors OÖ (loan)	37	(2)
2023–2024	DSV Leoben	6	(0)
2024–2025	Bulle	28	(0)
2025–	Kreuzlingen	34	(2)

International career^{‡}
2018	Switzerland U20	3	(0)
- * Club domestic league appearances and goals as of 28 September 2026 ‡ National team caps and goals as of 18:44, 30 September 2020 (UTC)

Enrique Wild (born 27 September 1999) is a Swiss footballer who plays as a defender for Kreuzlingen.

== Club career ==
On 1 September 2020, Wild signed a two-year contract with Juniors OÖ in Austria.

On 1 July 2021, Wild moved to LASK in the top-tier Austrian Football Bundesliga. On 7 February 2022, he returned to Juniors OÖ on loan.

== Career statistics ==
=== Club ===
As of match played 23 August 2023

Appearances and goals by club, season and competition
Club	Season	League			Cup (Note: Includes Swiss Cup, Austrian Cup)		Europe		Other		Total	
Club	Season	Division	Apps	Goals	Apps	Goals	Apps	Goals	Apps	Goals	Apps	Goals
Winterthur U21	2017–18	1. Liga	12	2	—		—		—		12	2
Winterthur U21	2018–19	1. Liga	3	0	—		—		—		3	0
Winterthur U21	2019–20	1. Liga	7	0	—		—		—		7	0
Winterthur U21	Total		22	2	—		—		—		22	2
Winterthur	2018–19	Challenge League	29	1	2	0	—		—		31	1
Winterthur	2019–20	Challenge League	7	0	0	0	—		—		7	0
Winterthur	Total		36	1	2	0	—		—		38	1
Juniors OÖ	2020–21	2. Liga	23	1	—		—		—		23	1
Juniors OÖ	2021–22	2. Liga	13	0	—		—		—		13	0
Juniors OÖ	2022–23	Austrian Regionalliga	24	2	—		—		—		24	2
Juniors OÖ	Total		60	3	—		—		—		60	3
LASK	2021–22	Austrian Bundesliga	1	0	1	0	1 (Note: Appearance(s) in the UEFA Conference League)	0	—		3	0
Career total			119	6	3	0	1	0	—		123	6
