= Marko Raguž =

Austrian footballer

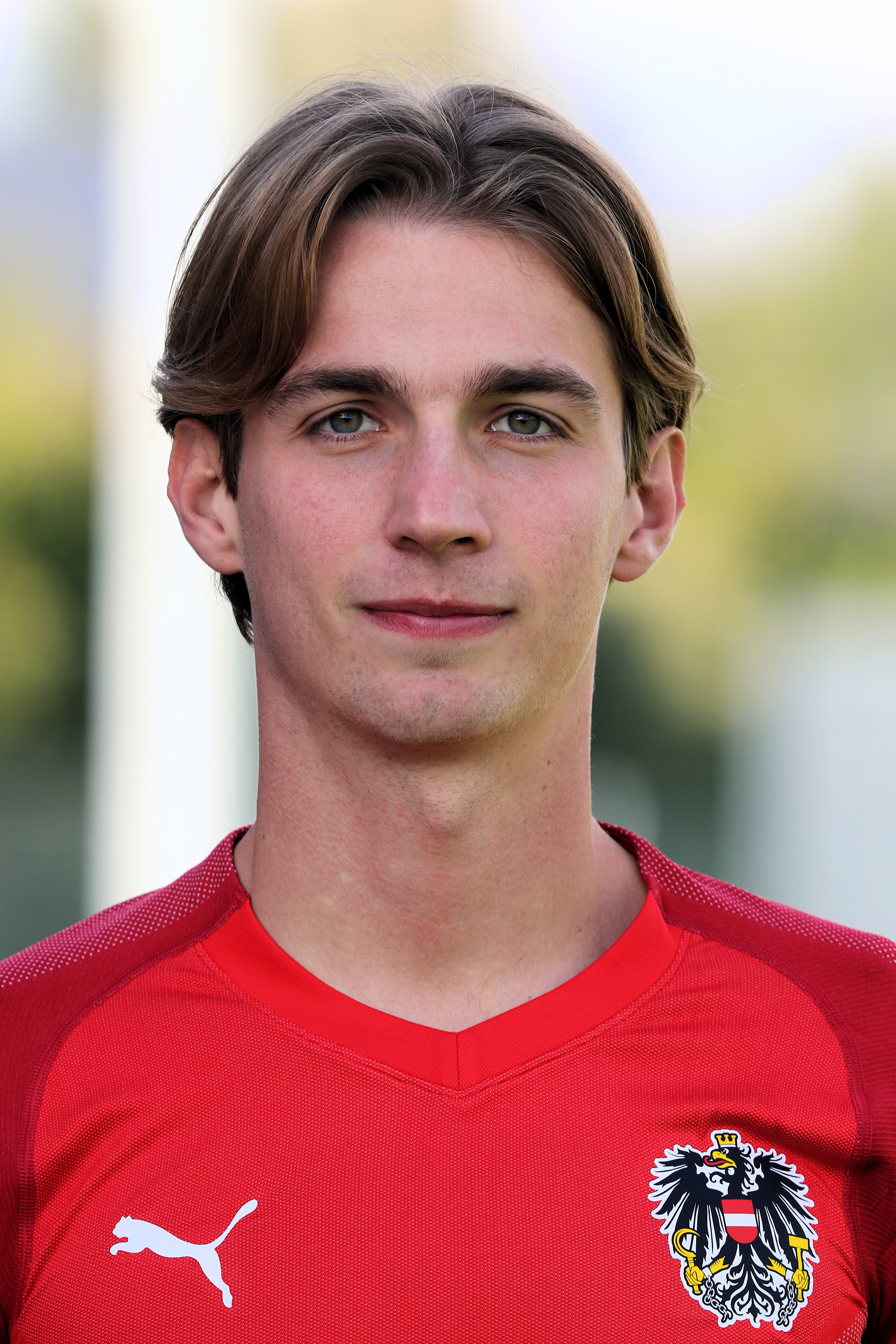
- Raguz with Austria U21 in 2019

Personal information
- Date of birth: 10 June 1998 (age 28)
- Place of birth: Grieskirchen, Austria
- Height: 1.92 m (6 ft 4 in)
- Position: Forward

Team information
- Current team: SCR Altach
- Number: 9

Youth career
- 2005–2012: UFC Eferding
- 2012–2016: AKA Linz

Senior career*
Years	Team	Apps	(Gls)
2016–2022	LASK Juniors	50	(24)
2017–2022	LASK	67	(12)
2022–2026	Austria Wien	30	(1)
2026–	SCR Altach	2	(0)

International career^{‡}
2015–2016	Austria U18	7	(1)
2017	Austria U19	4	(0)
2019	Austria U20	2	(2)
2019–2020	Austria U21	8	(3)
- * Club domestic league appearances and goals as of 15 August 2026 ‡ National team caps and goals as of 9 October 2020

Marko Raguž (Croatian pronunciation: [mâːrko râɡuːʒ]; born 10 June 1998) is an Austrian professional footballer who plays as a forward for Austrian Bundesliga club SCR Altach.

== Club career ==
Raguž made his Austrian Football First League debut for LASK on 3 March 2017 in a game against Wacker Innsbruck and scored on his debut. On 1 July 2022, Raguž will be transferred to Austria Wien of the Austrian Bundesliga.

== Personal life ==
Raguž's parents are from Novi Travnik in Bosnia and Herzegovina. He is eligible to play for Austria, Bosnia and Herzegovina and Croatia internationally.

== Career statistics ==
As of match played 7 July 2022

Appearances and goals by club, season and competition
Club	Season	League			Cup		Europe		Other		Total	
Club	Season	Division	Apps	Goals	Apps	Goals	Apps	Goals	Apps	Goals	Apps	Goals
LASK	2016–17	2. Liga	11	2	1	0	—		—		12	2
LASK	2017–18	Austrian Bundesliga	14	0	2	1	—		—		16	1
LASK	2018–19	Austrian Bundesliga	0	0	0	0	—		—		0	0
LASK	2019–20	Austrian Bundesliga	27	7	5	1	14	6	—		46	14
LASK	2020–21	Austrian Bundesliga	6	2	2	1	5	4	—		13	7
LASK	2021–22	Austrian Bundesliga	9	1	1	0	3	1	—		13	2
LASK	Total		67	12	11	3	22	11	0	0	100	26
Career total			67	12	11	3	22	11	0	0	100	26
