= Petar Filipović =

German footballer

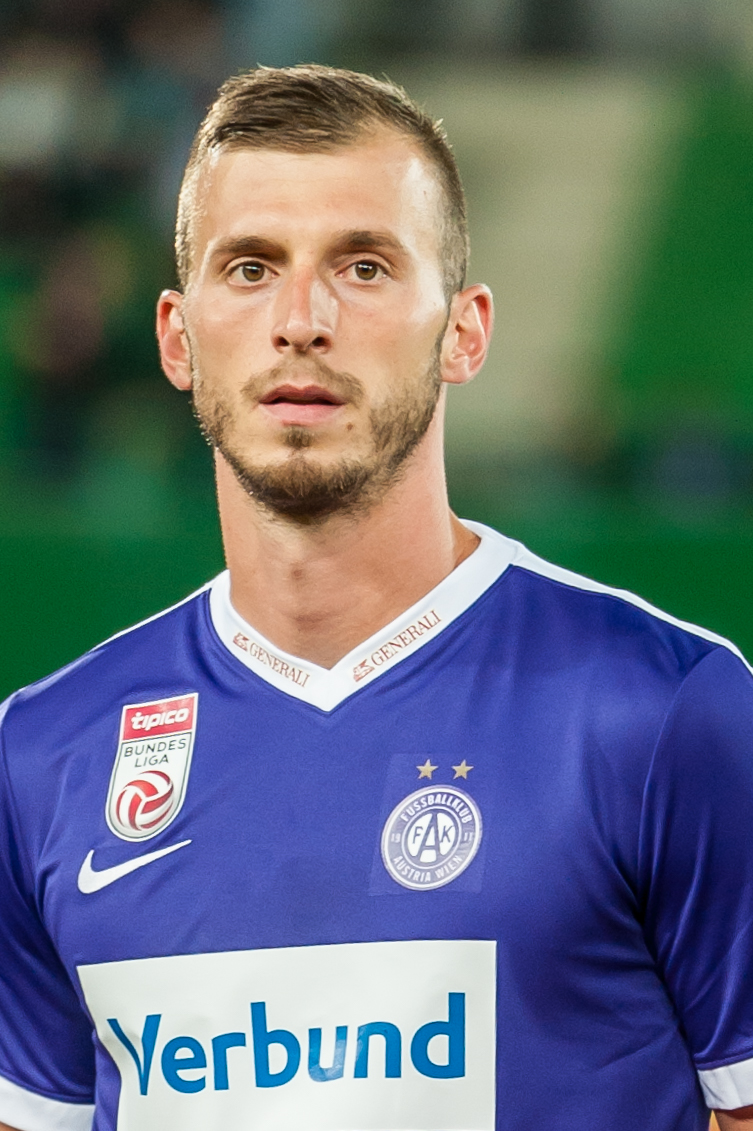
- Filipović in 2016

Personal information
- Date of birth: 14 September 1990 (age 36)
- Place of birth: Hamburg, West Germany
- Height: 1.88 m (6 ft 2 in)
- Position: Defender

Team information
- Current team: LASK Amateure OÖ (assistant manager)

Youth career
- MSV Hamburg
- –2002: SC Europa Hamburg
- 2002–2009: FC St. Pauli

Senior career*
Years	Team	Apps	(Gls)
2008–2012	FC St. Pauli	1	(0)
2008–2012	→ FC St. Pauli II	82	(10)
2012–2013	Cibalia	20	(2)
2013–2015	Slaven Belupo	22	(1)
2015–2016	Ried	46	(4)
2016–2017	Austria Wien	35	(4)
2017–2019	Konyaspor	28	(1)
2019–2022	LASK	56	(3)
2022–2024	AEL Limassol	30	(2)
2024–2026	Grazer AK	26	(1)

Managerial career
- 2026–: LASK Amateure OÖ (assistant)
- * Club domestic league appearances and goals

Petar Filipović (born 14 September 1990) is a German professional football coach and a former defender who is an assistant coach with Austrian team LASK Amateure OÖ.

== Club career ==
A product of the FC St. Pauli academy, Filipović played mostly in their reserve team, making his debut, and his only Bundesliga appearance so far on 14 May 2011, entering for Dennis Daube in a game against Mainz 05. After spending the 2011–12 season mostly in the reserve team, Filipović became a free agent, signing for Cibalia in the Prva HNL in late 2012.

On 24 June 2016, Filipović signed a three-year deal with Austria Wien. During his time in Austria, he was one of the most important members of the squad at achieving the second place in the Austrian Bundesliga and playing all six games in the groups of UEFA Europa League.

On 18 August 2017, he signed a three-year deal with Konyaspor.

On 12 July 2024, Filipović returned to Austria and signed a two-year contract with Grazer AK. On 27 January 2026, the contract was mutually terminated.

== International career ==
Filipović, who holds both Croatian and German nationality, was called up in early 2011 to the Croatia U21 national team by its selector at that time, Ivo Šušak. However, he did not answer the call, and it is alleged that the information about the call-up was withheld from him by his club.

== Coaching career ==
On 5 March 2026, Filipović was appointed an assistant coach of LASK Amateure OÖ, the reserve team of LASK.

== Career statistics ==
=== Club ===
As of match played 23 August 2023

Appearances and goals by club, season and competition
Club	Season	League			National Cup (Note: Includes Croatian Football Cup, Austrian Cup, Turkish Cup, Cypriot Cup)		Europe		Other		Total	
Club	Season	Division	Apps	Goals	Apps	Goals	Apps	Goals	Apps	Goals	Apps	Goals
St. Pauli II	2008–09	Oberliga Hamburg	4	0	—		—		2 (Note: Appearance(s) in play-offs)	0	6	0
St. Pauli II	2009–10	Regionalliga Nord	33	1	—		—		—		33	1
St. Pauli II	2010–11	Oberliga Hamburg	26	8	—		—		—		26	8
St. Pauli II	2011–12	Regionalliga Nord	17	1	—		—		—		17	1
St. Pauli II	Total		80	10	—		—		2	0	82	10
St. Pauli	2010–11	Bundesliga	1	0	0	0	—		—		1	0
Cibalia	2012–13	Croatian Premier League	20	2	0	0	—		—		20	2
Slaven Belupo	2013–14	Croatian Premier League	17	1	3	1	—		1	0	21	2
Slaven Belupo	2014–15	Croatian Premier League	6	0	0	0	—		—		6	0
Slaven Belupo	Total		23	1	3	1	—		1	0	27	2
SV Ried	2014–15	Austrian Bundesliga	14	2	0	0	—		—		14	2
SV Ried	2015–16	Austrian Bundesliga	32	2	3	0	—		—		35	2
SV Ried	Total		46	4	3	0	—		—		49	4
Austria Wien	2016–17	Austrian Bundesliga	31	4	3	0	12 (Note: Appearance(s) in UEFA Europa League)	0	—		46	4
Austria Wien	2017–18	Austrian Bundesliga	4	0	1	0	2	0	—		7	0
Austria Wien	Total		35	4	4	0	14	0	—		53	4
Konyaspor	2017–18	Süper Lig	16	0	5	0	3	0	0	0	24	0
Konyaspor	2018–19	Süper Lig	12	1	0	0	—		—		12	1
Konyaspor	Total		28	1	5	0	3	0	0	0	36	1
LASK	2019–20	Austrian Bundesliga	21	2	3	0	9	0	—		33	2
LASK	2020–21	Austrian Bundesliga	18	1	3	0	6	1	—		27	2
LASK	2021–22	Austrian Bundesliga	16	0	1	0	5 (Note: Appearance(s) in UEFA Conference League)	0	1	0	23	0
LASK	Total		55	3	7	0	20	1	1	0	83	4
AEL Limassol	2022–23	Cypriot First Division	8	0	1	0	—		—		9	0
Career total			296	25	23	1	37	1	4	0	360	27
