= Andrés Andrade (footballer, born 1998) =

Panamanian footballer

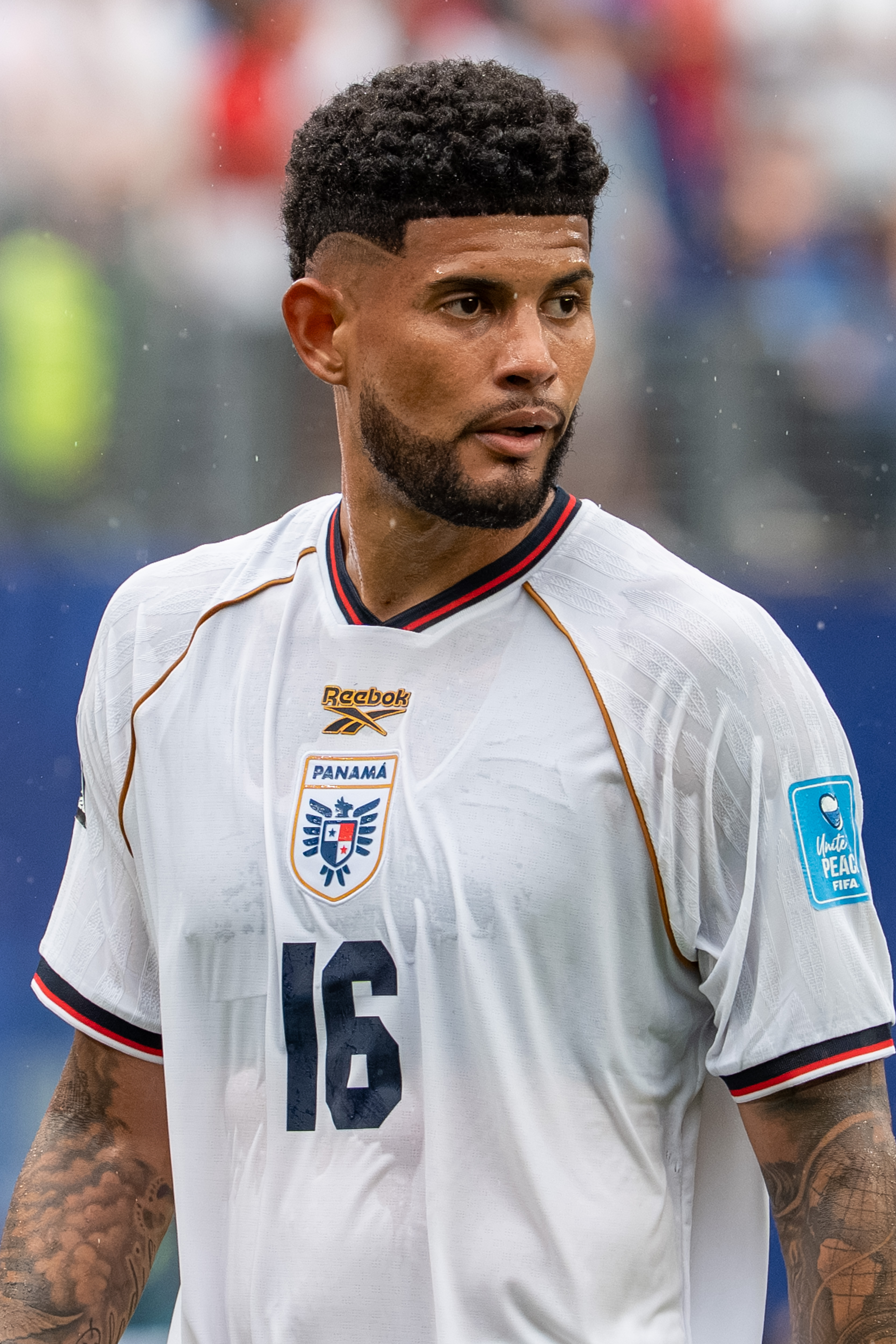
- Andrade with Panama in 2026

Personal information
- Full name: Andrés Alberto Andrade Cedeño
- Date of birth: 16 October 1998 (age 28)
- Place of birth: Panama City, Panama
- Height: 1.87 m (6 ft 2 in)
- Position: Defender

Team information
- Current team: LASK
- Number: 16

Youth career
- 2017: Toluca
- 2018: Querétaro

Senior career*
Years	Team	Apps	(Gls)
2016–2017	San Francisco	21	(0)
2018–2022	LASK	44	(0)
2019–2020	→ Juniors OÖ (loan)	34	(4)
2021–2022	→ Arminia Bielefeld (loan)	17	(0)
2022–2023	Arminia Bielefeld	26	(1)
2023–	LASK	77	(4)

International career^{‡}
- Panama U17
2017	Panama U20	5	(0)
2018–	Panama	53	(1)
Medal record
Men's football
Representing Panama
CONCACAF Gold Cup
Runner-up	2023 United States–Canada	Team
- * Club domestic league appearances and goals as of 31 October 2026 ‡ National team caps and goals as of 27 June 2026

Andrés Alberto Andrade Cedeño (born 16 October 1998) is a Panamanian professional footballer who plays as a defender for Austrian Football Bundesliga club LASK and the Panama national team.

== Club career ==
On 31 August 2021, the last day of the 2021 summer transfer window, Andrade joined Bundesliga club Arminia Bielefeld on loan for the 2021–22 season from Austrian Bundesliga side LASK. Arminia Bielefeld secured an option to sign him permanently which they did in June 2022.

In June 2023, Andrade returned to LASK on a four-year deal.

== International career ==
Andrade represented the Panama U20 national team at the 2017 CONCACAF U-20 Championship, scoring once.

On 16 November 2018, Andrade made his debut for the senior Panama national team against Honduras as a 72nd-minute substitute for Erick Davis.

== Career statistics ==
=== Club ===
As of match played 3 November 2026

Appearances and goals by club, season and competition
Club	Season	League			National cup (Note: Includes Austrian Cup, DFB-Pokal)		Continental		Other		Total	
Club	Season	Division	Apps	Goals	Apps	Goals	Apps	Goals	Apps	Goals	Apps	Goals
San Francisco	2015–16	Liga LPF	—		—		1 (Note: Appearances in CONCACAF Champions Cup)	0	—		1	0
San Francisco	2016–17	Liga LPF	21	0	0	0	—		—		21	0
San Francisco	2017–18	Liga LPF	0	0	0	0	—		—		0	0
San Francisco	Total		21	0	0	0	1	0	—		22	0
Juniors OÖ	2018–19	2. Liga	20	1	0	0	—		—		20	1
Juniors OÖ	2019–20	2. Liga	14	3	2	0	—		—		16	3
Juniors OÖ	Total		34	4	2	0	—		—		36	4
LASK	2019–20	Austrian Bundesliga	10	0	0	0	1 (Note: Appearances in UEFA Europa League)	0	—		11	0
LASK	2020–21	Austrian Bundesliga	32	0	5	0	6	0	—		43	0
LASK	2021–22	Austrian Bundesliga	2	0	0	0	2 (Note: Appearances in UEFA Europa Conference League)	0	—		4	0
LASK	Total		44	0	5	0	9	0	0	0	58	0
Arminia Bielefeld (loan)	2021–22	Bundesliga	17	0	1	0	—		—		18	0
Arminia Bielefeld	2022–23	2. Bundesliga	26	1	1	0	—		2 (Note: Appearances in promotion play-offs)	0	29	1
LASK	2023–24	Austrian Bundesliga	30	0	2	0	8	0	—		40	0
LASK	2024–25	Austrian Bundesliga	7	1	1	0	—		—		8	1
LASK	2025–26	Austrian Bundesliga	29	1	6	2	0	0	—		35	3
LASK	2026–27	Austrian Bundesliga	11	2	2	1	6 (Note: Appearances in UEFA Champions League)	0	—		19	3
LASK	Total		77	4	11	3	14	0	—		102	7
Career total			218	9	20	3	24	0	2	0	265	12

=== International ===
As of match played 27 June 2026

Appearances and goals by national team and year
National team	Year	Apps	Goals
Panama	2018	1	0
Panama	2020	2	0
Panama	2021	11	1
Panama	2022	6	0
Panama	2023	14	0
Panama	2024	2	0
Panama	2025	10	0
Panama	2026	7	0
Total		53	1

=== International goals ===
As of September 5, 2021
Scores and results list Panama's goal tally first, score column indicates score after each Andrade goal.

List of international goals scored by Andrés Andrade
No.	Date	Venue	Opponent	Score	Result	Competition
1	September 5, 2021	Independence Park, Kingston, Jamaica	Jamaica	1–0	3–0	2022 FIFA World Cup qualification

== Honours ==
LASK

- Austrian Bundesliga: 2025–26
- Austrian Cup: 2025–26

Panama

- CONCACAF Gold Cup runner-up: 2023

Individual

- CONCACAF U-20 Championship Best XI: 2017
