= Peter Michorl =

Austrian footballer

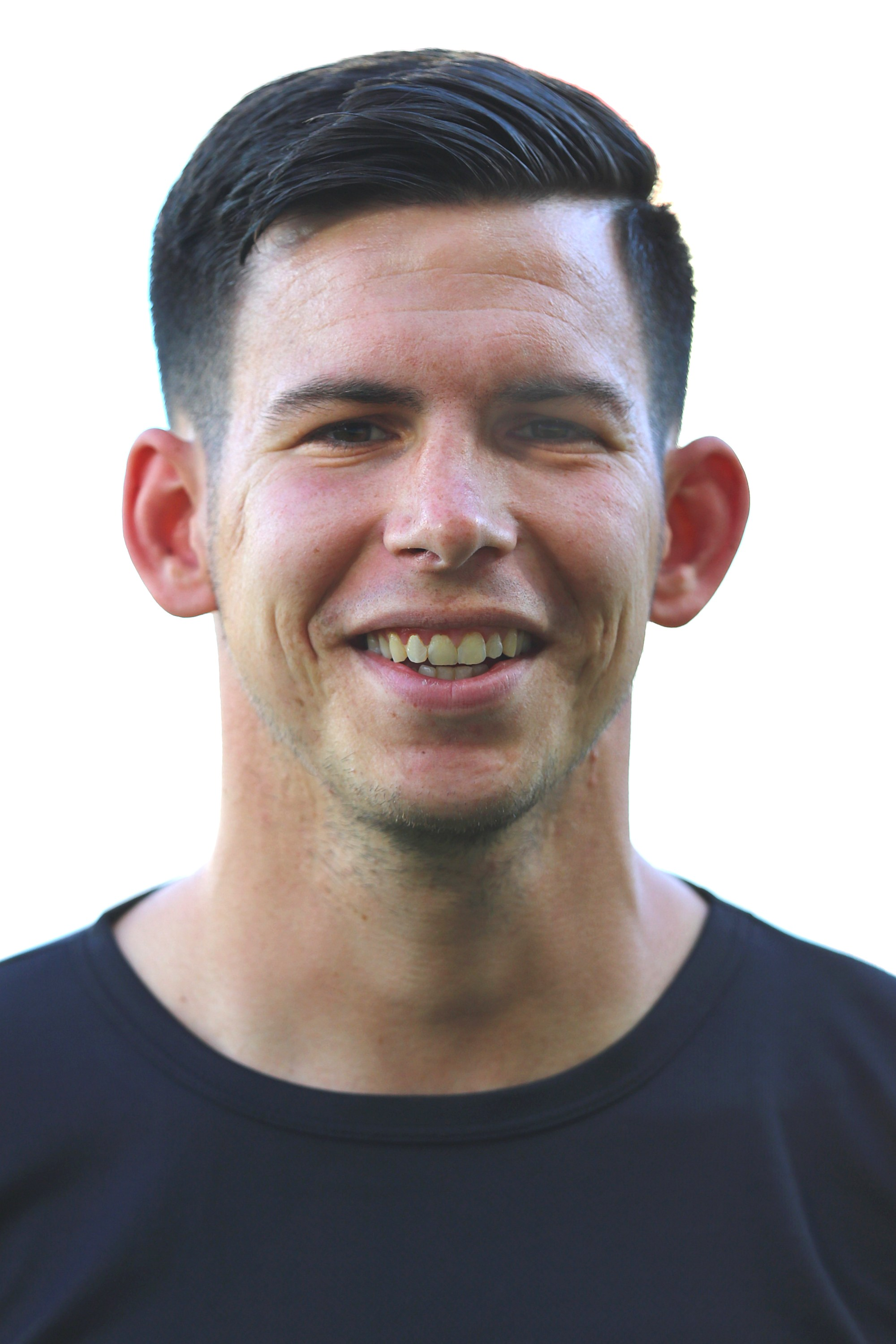
- Michorl in 2018

Personal information
- Date of birth: 9 May 1995 (age 31)
- Place of birth: Vienna, Austria
- Height: 1.76 m (5 ft 9 in)
- Position: Midfielder

Team information
- Current team: Grazer AK
- Number: 34

Youth career
- 2001–2004: Gerasdorf/Stammersdorf
- 2004–2011: Austria Wien

Senior career*
Years	Team	Apps	(Gls)
2011–2015	Austria Wien II	63	(14)
2014–2015	→ LASK (loan)	24	(0)
2015–2024	LASK	254	(27)
2024–2026	Atromitos	57	(3)
2026–	Grazer AK	3	(0)

International career^{‡}
2010	Austria U16	3	(0)
2011	Austria U17	5	(0)
2012–2013	Austria U18	5	(0)
2013–2014	Austria U19	11	(2)
2015	Austria U20	3	(0)
2016	Austria U21	1	(0)
- * Club domestic league appearances and goals as of 16 August 2026 ‡ National team caps and goals as of 31 May 2016

Peter Michorl (born 9 May 1995) is an Austrian professional footballer who plays as a midfielder for Austrian Bundesliga club Grazer AK.

== Club career ==
On 30 July 2024, left LASK after a decade, moving abroad for the first time in his career signing a two-year contract with Atromitos.

== International career ==
Michorl represented Austria at the 2014 UEFA European Under-19 Championship, where they reached semifinals, and the 2015 FIFA U-20 World Cup, where they were eliminated in the Round of 16.

== Career statistics ==
=== Club ===
As of match played 4 August 2024

Appearances and goals by club, season and competition
Club	Season	League			National Cup		Europe		Other		Total	
Club	Season	Division	Apps	Goals	Apps	Goals	Apps	Goals	Apps	Goals	Apps	Goals
Austria Wien II	2011–12	Austrian Regionalliga	15	1	—		—		—		15	1
Austria Wien II	2012–13	Austrian Regionalliga	26	5	—		—		—		26	5
Austria Wien II	2013–14	Austrian Regionalliga	22	8	—		—		—		22	8
Austria Wien II	Total		63	14	—		—		—		63	14
LASK	2014–15	2. Liga	24	0	0	0	—		—		24	0
LASK	2015–16	2. Liga	28	1	3	0	—		—		31	1
LASK	2016–17	2. Liga	32	2	5	0	—		—		37	2
LASK	2017–18	Austrian Bundesliga	34	9	3	2	—		—		37	11
LASK	2018–19	Austrian Bundesliga	31	3	5	0	4 (Note: Appearance(s) in UEFA Europa League)	0	—		40	3
LASK	2019–20	Austrian Bundesliga	30	5	4	2	14 (Note: Four appearances in UEFA Champions League, ten appearances in UEFA Europa League)	0	—		48	7
LASK	2020–21	Austrian Bundesliga	31	3	6	1	7	3	—		44	7
LASK	2021–22	Austrian Bundesliga	28	4	4	3	11 (Note: Appearance(s) in UEFA Conference League)	2	1 (Note: Appearance(s) in play-off)	0	44	9
LASK	2022–23	Austrian Bundesliga	28	0	5	0	—		—		33	0
LASK	2023–24	Austrian Bundesliga	11	0	2	0	0	0	—		13	0
LASK	Total		277	27	37	8	36	5	1	0	351	40
Career total			340	41	37	8	36	5	1	0	414	54
