= Philipp Wiesinger =

Austrian footballer

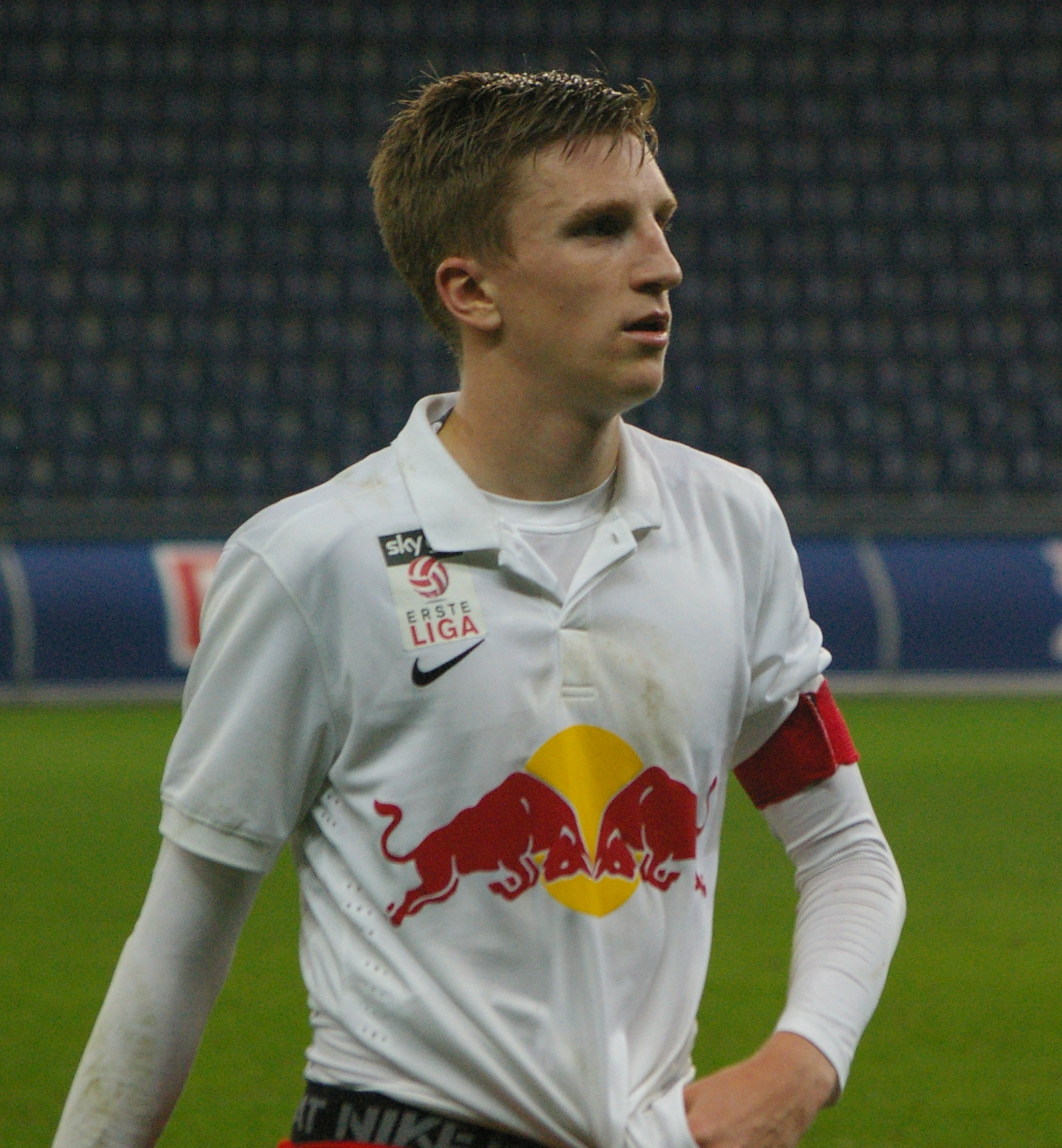
- Wiesinger in November 2014

Personal information
- Date of birth: 23 May 1994 (age 32)
- Place of birth: Salzburg, Austria
- Height: 1.81 m (5 ft 11 in)
- Position: Defender

Team information
- Current team: Austria Wien
- Number: 28

Youth career
- 2001–2006: FC Puch
- 2006–2012: Red Bull Salzburg

Senior career*
Years	Team	Apps	(Gls)
2012–2013	USK Anif	25	(0)
2013–2016	FC Liefering	69	(3)
2016	→ LASK Linz (loan)	0	(0)
2016–2024	LASK	129	(7)
2024–	Austria Wien	51	(2)

International career^{‡}
2015	Austria U-21	1	(0)
2020–	Austria	1	(1)
- * Club domestic league appearances and goals as of 1 June 2026 ‡ National team caps and goals as of 11 November 2020

Philipp Wiesinger (born 23 May 1994) is an Austrian professional footballer who plays as a defender for Austrian Bundesliga club Austria Wien and the Austria national team.

== International career ==
He made his debut for Austria national football team on 11 November 2020 in a friendly game against Luxembourg. He started the game and scored the last goal in added time to establish the final score of 3–0.

== Career statistics ==
=== Club ===
As of match played 23 August 2023

Appearances and goals by club, season and competition
Club	Season	League			National Cup (Note: Includes Austrian Cup)		Europe		Other		Total	
Club	Season	Division	Apps	Goals	Apps	Goals	Apps	Goals	Apps	Goals	Apps	Goals
USK Anif	2011–12	Austrian Regionalliga	1	0	0	0	—		—		1	0
USK Anif	2012–13	Austrian Regionalliga	25	0	—		—		—		25	0
USK Anif	Total		26	0	0	0	—		—		26	0
FC Liefering	2013–14	2. Liga	24	1	—		—		—		24	1
FC Liefering	2014–15	2. Liga	31	1	—		—		—		31	1
FC Liefering	2015–16	2. Liga	14	1	—		—		—		14	1
FC Liefering	Total		69	3	—		—		—		69	3
FC Juniors OÖ	2016–17	Austrian Regionalliga	4	0	—		—		—		4	0
FC Juniors OÖ	2017–18	Austrian Regionalliga	2	0	—		—		—		2	0
FC Juniors OÖ	Total		6	0	—		—		—		6	0
LASK	2016–17	2. Liga	10	0	0	0	—		—		10	0
LASK	2017–18	Austrian Bundesliga	20	0	2	1	—		—		22	1
LASK	2018–19	Austrian Bundesliga	28	3	4	0	0	0	—		32	3
LASK	2019–20	Austrian Bundesliga	27	1	4	0	13 (Note: Four appearances in UEFA Champions League, nine appearances and one goal in UEFA Europa League)	1	—		44	2
LASK	2020–21	Austrian Bundesliga	26	2	5	1	8 (Note: Appearance(s) in UEFA Europa League)	1	—		39	4
LASK	2021–22	Austrian Bundesliga	16	1	1	0	7 (Note: Appearance(s) in UEFA Conference League)	2	—		24	3
LASK	2022–23	Austrian Bundesliga	2	0	0	0	—		—		2	0
LASK	Total		129	7	16	2	28	4	—		173	13
Career total			230	10	16	2	28	4	—		274	16
