= Thomas Goiginger =

Austrian footballer (born 1993)

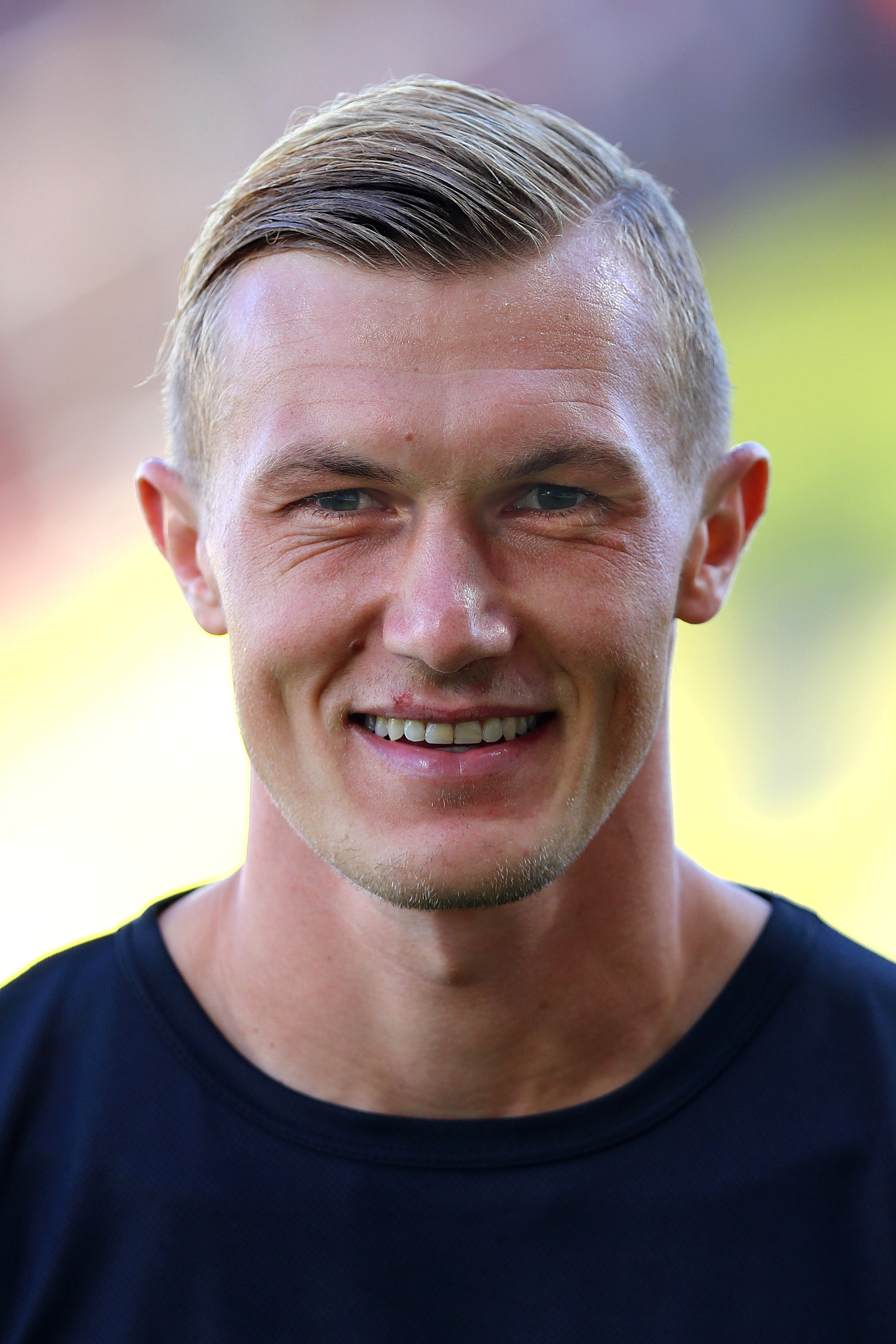
- Goiginger with LASK Linz in 2018

Personal information
- Date of birth: 15 March 1993 (age 33)
- Place of birth: Linz, Austria
- Height: 1.81 m (5 ft 11 in)
- Position: Midfielder

Team information
- Current team: WSG Tirol
- Number: 36

Senior career*
Years	Team	Apps	(Gls)
2011–2012	Union Vöcklamarkt	13	(1)
2012–2014	Neumarkt	72	(19)
2014–2016	SV Grödig	32	(1)
2016–2017	FC Blau-Weiß Linz	33	(8)
2017–2024	LASK	177	(37)
2024	VfL Osnabrück	9	(0)
2024–2026	Blau-Weiß Linz	43	(3)
2026–	WSG Tirol	2	(0)

International career^{‡}
2019–	Austria	1	(0)
- * Club domestic league appearances and goals as of 7 August 2026 ‡ National team caps and goals as of 19 November 2019

Thomas Goiginger (born 15 March 1993) is an Austrian professional footballer who plays as a midfielder for Austrian Bundesliga club WSG Tirol.

== Club career ==
Goiginger has played for Union Vöcklamarkt, TSV Neumarkt, SV Grödig, FC Blau-Weiß Linz, and LASK Linz.

In February 2024, Goiginger joined 2. Bundesliga club VfL Osnabrück.

On 19 July 2024, Goiginger returned to Blau-Weiß Linz on a two-year deal.

He signed for WSG Tirol in 2026.

== International career ==
In November 2018, Goiginger was called up to the Austria squad for the first team and was unused substitute during their UEFA Nations League matches against Bosnia and Herzegovina and Northern Ireland.

He made his debut on 19 November 2019 in a Euro 2020 qualifier against Latvia. He started the game and played the first 69 minutes.

== Career statistics ==
As of 29 May 2023

Appearances and goals by club, season and competition
Club	Season	League			Cup		Continental		Other		Total	
Club	Season	Division	Apps	Goals	Apps	Goals	Apps	Goals	Apps	Goals	Apps	Goals
Grödig	2014–15	Austrian Bundesliga	16	1	0	0	0	0	—		16	1
Grödig	2015–16	Austrian Bundesliga	16	0	1	0	—		—		17	0
Grödig	Total		32	1	1	1	0	0	—		33	1
Blau-Weiß Linz	2016–17	2. Liga	33	8	3	0	—		—		36	8
LASK	2017–18	Austrian Bundesliga	33	7	3	0	—		—		36	7
LASK	2018–19	Austrian Bundesliga	31	6	5	5	4	3	—		40	14
LASK	2019–20	Austrian Bundesliga	18	5	4	2	12	2	—		34	9
LASK	2020–21	Austrian Bundesliga	28	6	5	0	6	0	—		39	6
LASK	2021–22	Austrian Bundesliga	30	8	3	1	12	2	—		45	11
LASK	2022–23	Austrian Bundesliga	24	4	3	3	—		—		27	7
LASK	Total		164	37	22	11	34	7	0	0	221	54
Career total			229	45	27	11	34	7	0	0	290	63
