= Stefan Haudum =

Austrian footballer (born 1994)

Personal information
- Date of birth: 27 November 1994 (age 31)
- Place of birth: Eferding, Austria
- Height: 1.88 m (6 ft 2 in)
- Position: Midfielder

Team information
- Current team: Admira Wacker
- Number: 23

Youth career
- 2000–2001: UFC Eferding
- 2001–2008: SK Eferding/Fraham
- 2008–2012: AKA Linz

Senior career*
Years	Team	Apps	(Gls)
2012–2019	Blau-Weiß Linz	149	(4)
2019–2021	LASK	16	(2)
2021–2023	Rheindorf Altach	77	(3)
2023–2024	Blau-Weiß Linz	14	(0)
2024–	Admira Wacker	55	(2)
- * Club domestic league appearances and goals as of 17 May 2026

Stefan Haudum (born 27 November 1994) is an Austrian professional footballer who plays as a midfielder for 2. Liga club Admira Wacker.

== Club career ==
He made his Austrian Football First League debut for Blau-Weiß Linz on 2 November 2012 in a game against SV Horn.

On 23 June 2023, Haudum signed a one-season contract to return to Blau-Weiß Linz.

On 6 June 2024, Haudum moved to Admira Wacker.
