= Stadion Schnabelholz =

Football stadium in Altach, Austria

Coordinates: 47°21′14″N 9°38′12″E

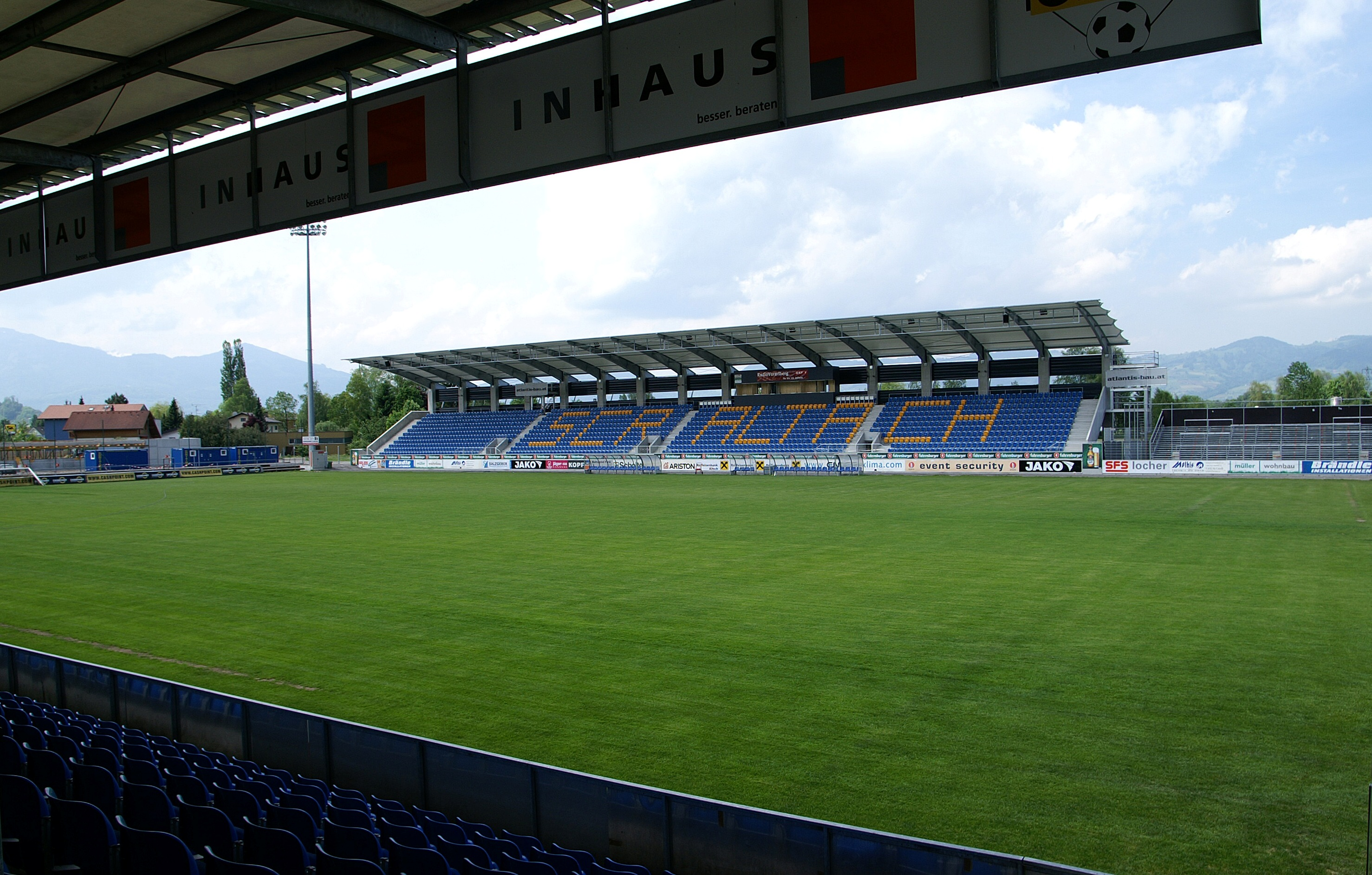
Cashpoint Arena, Altach

Stadion Schnabelholz, currently known as the CASHPOINT Arena for sponsorship reasons, is a multi-purpose stadium in Altach, Vorarlberg, Austria. It is currently used mostly for football matches and is the home ground of SC Rheindorf Altach. The stadium has a capacity of 8,500 and was built in 1990.

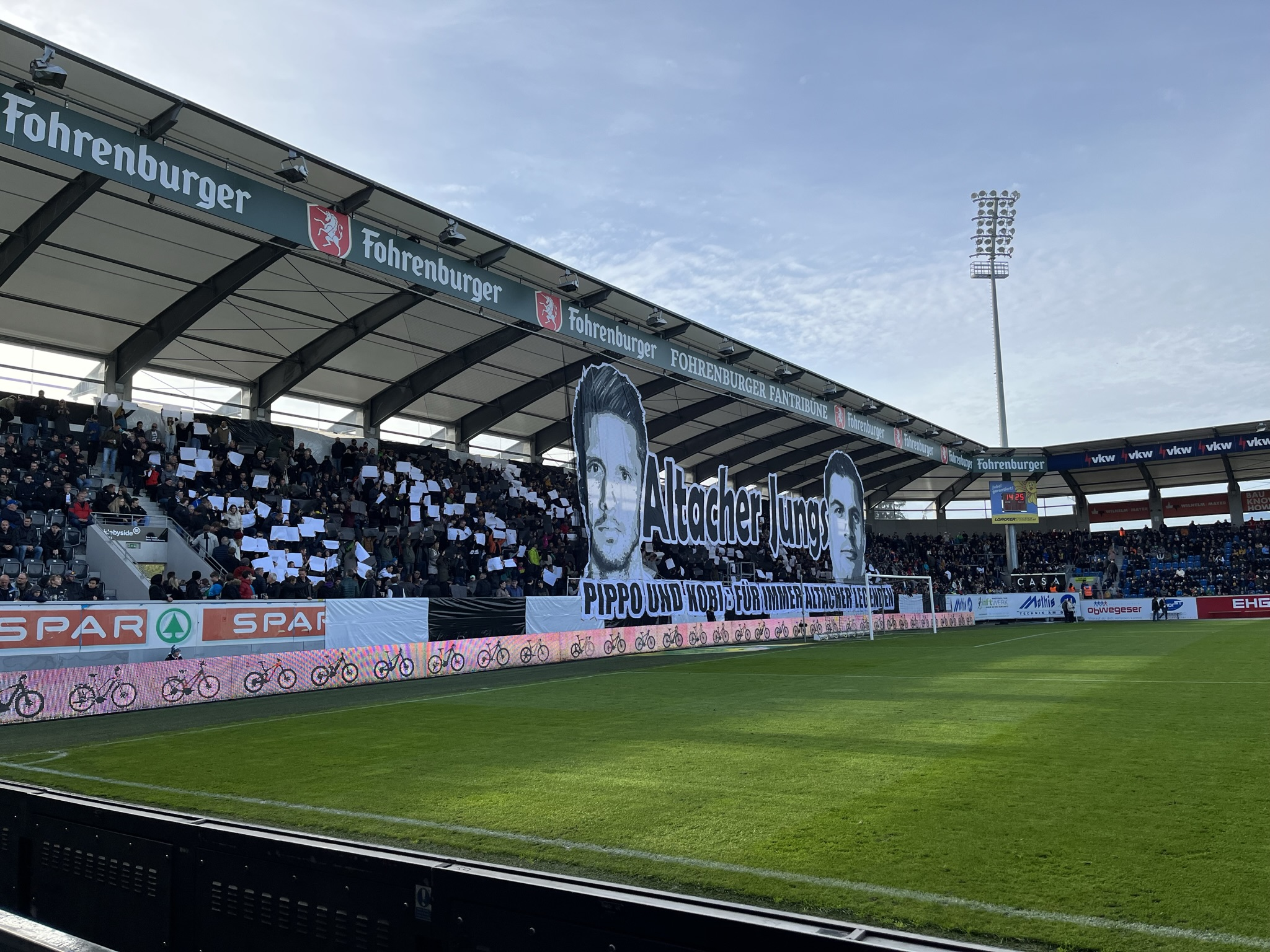
The Altach fans' stand with a tifo before a match against Sturm Graz. (2022)
