= Waldstadion (Austria) =

Multi-use stadium in Pasching, Austria

Coordinates: 48°14′11″N 14°13′42″E

Raiffeisen Arena
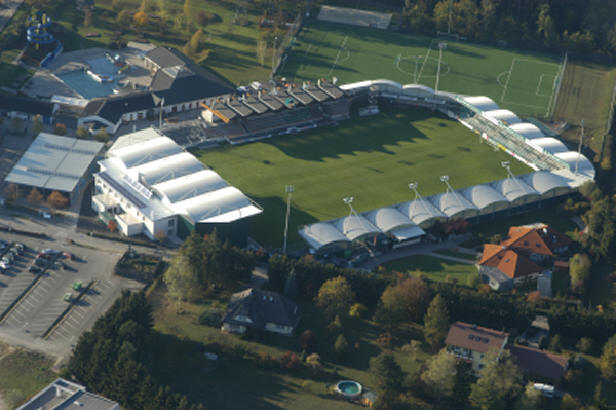
- An aerial view of the TGW Arena, Pasching
- Interactive map of Raiffeisen Arena
- Former names: Waldstadion
- Location: Pasching, Austria
- Capacity: 7,870
- Surface: Hybrid Pitch

Construction
- Opened: May 1990
- Renovated: 2002, 2017

Tenants
- FC Juniors OÖ; LASK Linz (2017–2023)

The Waldstadion (German pronunciation: [ˈvaltˌʃtaːdi̯ɔn]), currently known as Voestalpine Stadium for sponsorship purposes, is a multi-use stadium in Pasching, Austria. It is used for football matches and is the home ground of FC Juniors OÖ. Austrian Bundesliga club LASK Linz used the stadium until their new stadium was completed in 2023. The stadium holds 7,870 and was built in 1990. In 2016, LASK purchased the VIP tent from SV Grödig and installed it in the stadium. In February 2017, the stadium was refurbished, with a new away sector and extra home seating, this was required for the stadium to reach Austrian Bundesliga standards.

== History ==
TGW Logistics Group announced the stadium sponsorship in 2017. The company has operations in Europe, North America and Asia. Headquarters are in Wels, Austria.

In 2011, it hosted the finals of the Fistball World Championship, in which the German team beat the local Austria by a score of 4–2. In mid-July 2019, the Raiffeisen Banking Group acquired the naming rights until LASK move out in 2022.
