= Thomas Gebauer =

German footballer

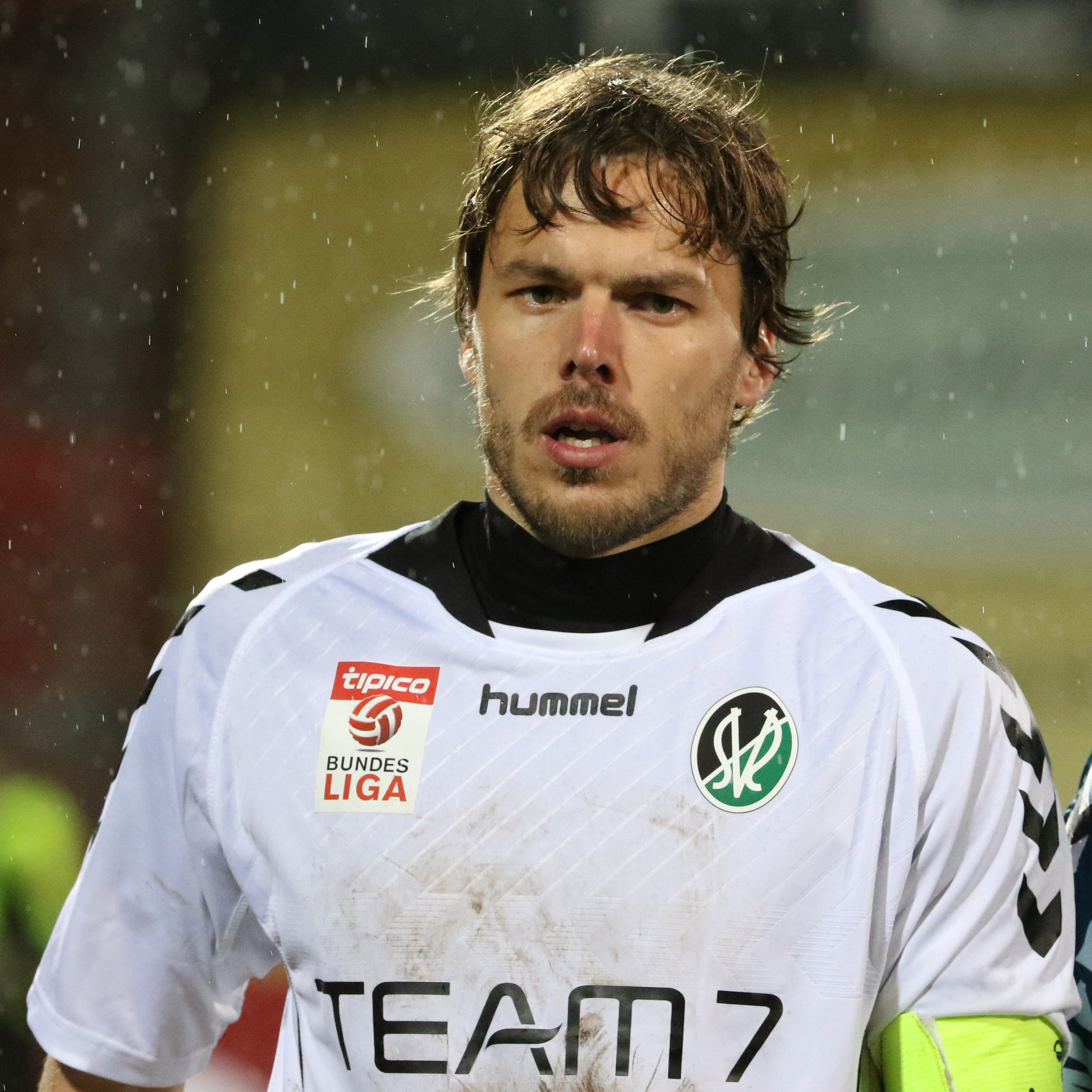
- Gebauer with SV Ried in 2016

Personal information
- Date of birth: 30 June 1982 (age 44)
- Place of birth: Augsburg, West Germany
- Height: 1.93 m (6 ft 4 in)
- Position: Goalkeeper

Team information
- Current team: SKU Amstetten (assistant coach)

Senior career*
Years	Team	Apps	(Gls)
2001–2004	TSV Aindling	101	(0)
2004–2005	1860 Munich II	10	(0)
2005–2006	SpVgg Bayreuth	22	(0)
2006–2018	SV Ried	342	(0)
2018–2023	LASK	1	(0)

Managerial career
- 2023–: SKU Amstetten (assistant)
- * Club domestic league appearances and goals

Thomas Gebauer (born 30 June 1982) is a German professional football coach and a former player who played as a goalkeeper. He is an assistant coach with SKU Amstetten.

== Coaching career ==
In the summer of 2023, Gebauer was hired as an assistant coach by SKU Amstetten.

== Personal life ==
Born in Germany, he acquired Austrian citizenship in October 2012.
