= Maksym Talovierov =

Ukrainian footballer (born 2000)

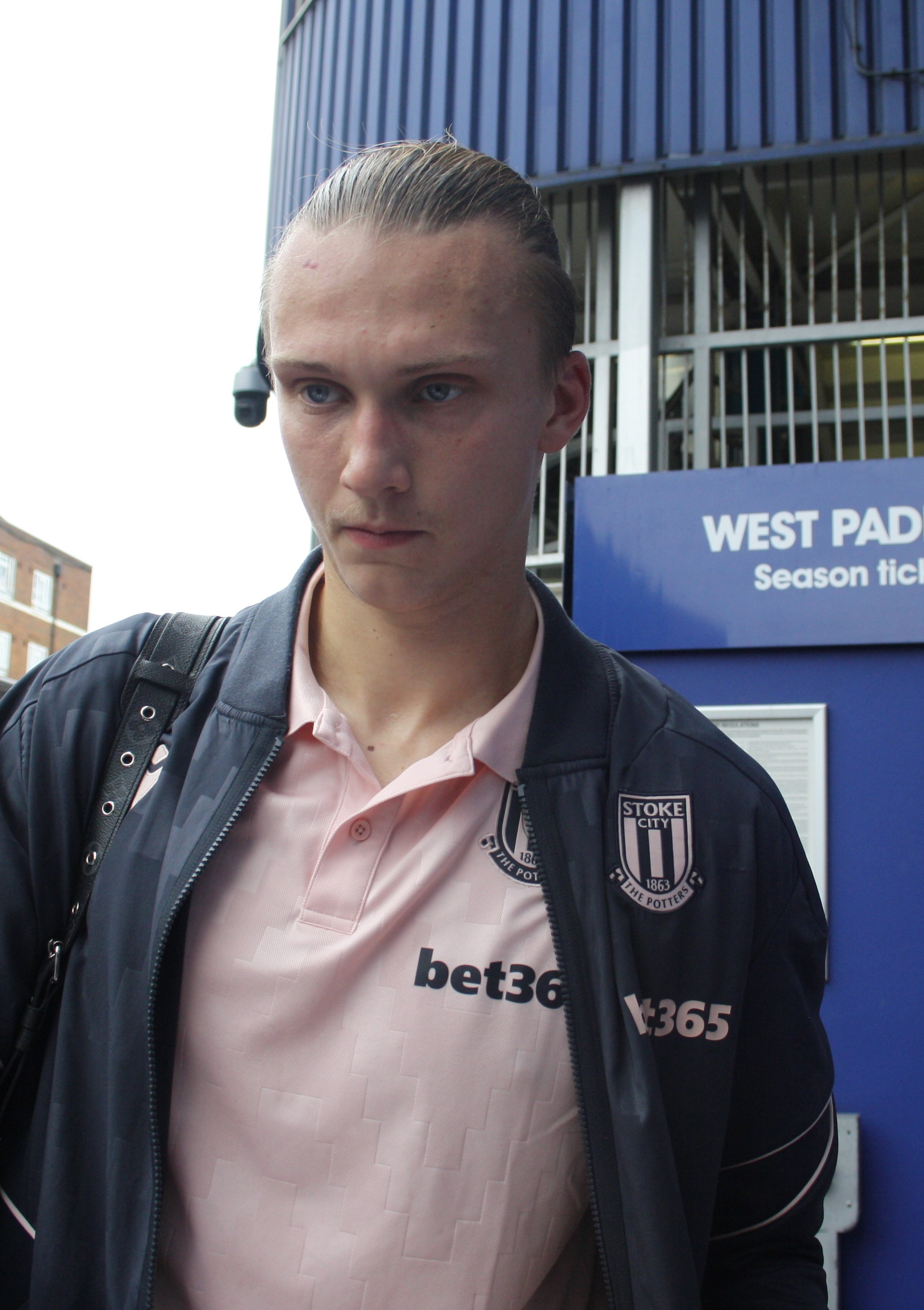
- Talovierov in 2025

Personal information
- Full name: Maksym Vadymovych Talovierov
- Date of birth: 28 June 2000 (age 26)
- Place of birth: Nalchik, Russia
- Height: 1.96 m (6 ft 5 in)
- Position: Centre-back

Team information
- Current team: Stoke City
- Number: 40

Youth career
- 2006–2015: Shakhtar Donetsk
- 2015–2016: Arsenal Kyiv
- 2016–2018: Olimpik Donetsk

Senior career*
Years	Team	Apps	(Gls)
2019–2022	Dynamo České Budějovice	47	(1)
2019	→ Sparta Prague B (loan)	13	(0)
2022–2024	Slavia Prague	11	(0)
2022	→ Slovan Liberec (loan)	13	(1)
2023–2024	→ LASK (loan)	24	(0)
2024–2025	LASK	25	(0)
2025	Plymouth Argyle	11	(1)
2025–	Stoke City	26	(0)

International career^{‡}
2021–2023	Ukraine U21	21	(0)
2024	Ukraine U23	5	(0)
2024–	Ukraine	8	(0)
Medal record
Men's football
Representing Ukraine
UEFA European Under-21 Championship
Bronze medal – third place	2023 Georgia-Romania
- * Club domestic league appearances and goals as of 22:03, 3 November 2026 (UTC) ‡ National team caps and goals as of 10 June 2025

Maksym Vadymovych Talovierov (Ukrainian: Максим Вадимович Таловєров; born 28 June 2000) is a professional footballer who plays as a centre-back for EFL Championship club Stoke City. Born in Russia, he plays for the Ukraine national team.

Talovierov played in the youth teams at Shakhtar Donetsk, Arsenal Kyiv and Olimpik Donetsk before joining Czech side Dynamo České Budějovice to begin his professional career. After three years at the Stadion Střelecký ostrov he earned a move to Slavia Prague. Unable to fully break into the team at Slavia he spent time out on loan at Slovan Liberec and then Austrian side LASK, joining them permanently in February 2024. In January 2025, he moved to English side Plymouth Argyle and then in the summer of 2025 to Stoke City.

== Career ==
=== Early life & career ===
Talovierov was born in the Russian city of Nalchik, where his father, Vadym, was playing for Spartak Nalchik. When he was a few months old, his family moved to Donetsk. Talovierov played in the youth teams at Shakhtar Donetsk and spent the 2015–16 season with Arsenal Kyiv. In 2016, he joined Olimpik Donetsk playing in the Ukrainian Premier League Reserves and was never promoted to the senior squad. In February 2019 he was signed by the Czech First League side Dynamo České Budějovice.

=== Dynamo České Budějovice ===
After gaining first team experience with Sparta Prague's B team in the Bohemian Football League, Talovierov returned to České Budějovice in the second half of the 2019–20 season. He made his professional debut on 31 May 2020 in a 3–2 defeat against Bohemians 1905. He became a regular member of the first team in 2020–21, making 27 appearances, scoring his first senior goal against Teplice on 21 January 2021. After impressing for Dynamo in the first half of the 2021–22 season he was linked with a transfer to a bigger club.

=== Slavia Prague ===
Talovierov joined the current Czech champions Slavia Prague in January 2022 for an undisclosed fee. He made 16 appearances for Slavia in the second half of the 2021–22 season as the team finished runners-up in the league to Viktoria Plzeň and were knocked out of the UEFA Conference League in the quarter-final by Feyenoord. Ahead of the 2022–23 campaign, Talovierov was loaned out to Slovan Liberec where he played 16 times, scoring twice before returning to Slavia in December 2022.

=== LASK ===
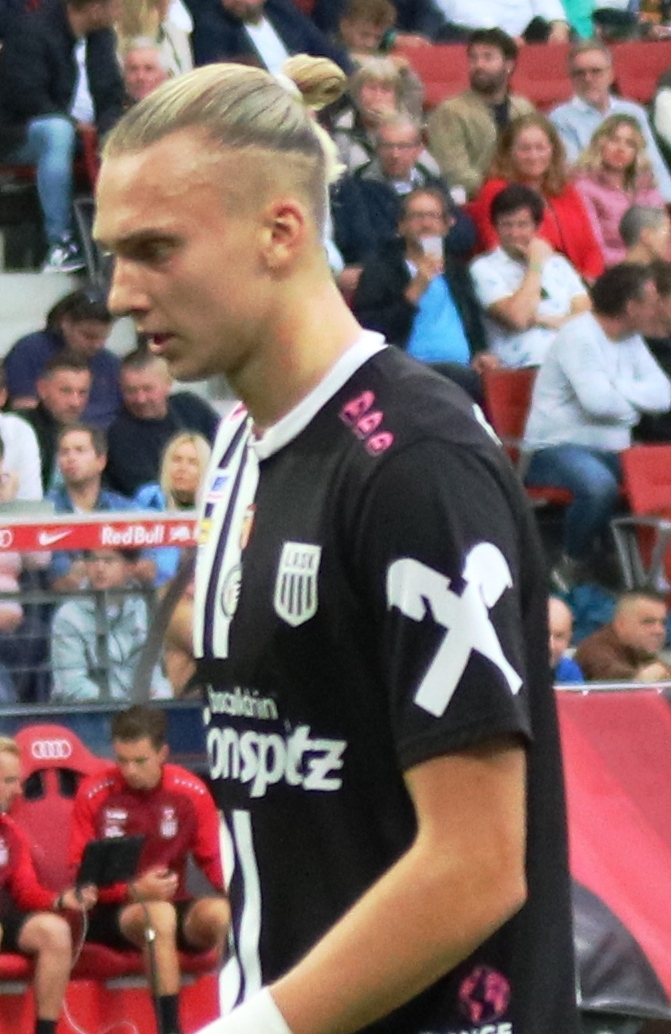
Talovierov playing for LASK in 2023.

On 1 February 2023, Talovierov signed for Austrian Bundesliga club LASK on loan until the end of the 2022–23 season. He played 13 times for LASK in 2022–23, helping them to secure a place in the UEFA Europa League. In August 2023, Talovierov returned to LASK on loan for the 2023–24 season. LASK made the transfer permanent on 5 February 2024, with Talovierov signing a contract until the summer of 2027.

=== Plymouth Argyle ===
On 31 January 2025, EFL Championship club Plymouth Argyle announced the signing of Talovierov for an undisclosed record fee on a three-and-a-half-year contract. He made his debut the following day against West Bromwich Albion. He scored against relegation rivals Luton Town on 19 February 2025, earning Argyle a 1–1 draw. He scored again the following week to open the scoring against Manchester City in the FA Cup, though Plymouth went on to lose 3–1. Talovierov missed the remainder of the 2024–25 season because of a knee injury. Plymouth were relegated to League One on the final day of the season and Talovierov was linked with a transfer away from Home Park.

=== Stoke City ===
On 5 July 2025, Talovierov joined Championship club Stoke City on a three-year deal for an undisclosed fee. He suffered an injury during pre-season which kept him out of the side until December 2025. In 2025–26 Talovierov played 19 times before his season was ended in March 2026 due to an ankle injury he sustained whilst on international duty.

== Personal life ==
His father, Vadym Taloverov, is a retired football defender.

== Career statistics ==
=== Club ===
As of match played 3 November 2026

Appearances and goals by club, season and competition
Club	Season	League			National cup (Note: Includes Austrian Cup, Czech Cup, FA Cup)		League cup (Note: Includes EFL Cup)		Other		Total	
Club	Season	Division	Apps	Goals	Apps	Goals	Apps	Goals	Apps	Goals	Apps	Goals
Dynamo České Budějovice	2019–20	Czech First League	7	0	0	0	—		—		7	0
Dynamo České Budějovice	2020–21	Czech First League	26	1	1	0	—		—		27	1
Dynamo České Budějovice	2021–22	Czech First League	14	0	2	0	—		—		16	0
Dynamo České Budějovice	Total		47	1	3	0	—		—		50	1
Sparta Prague B (loan)	2019–20	ČFL	13	0	—		—		—		13	0
Slavia Prague	2021–22	Czech First League	11	0	0	0	—		5 (Note: Appearances in UEFA Conference League)	0	16	0
Slovan Liberec (loan)	2022–23	Czech First League	13	1	3	1	—		—		16	2
LASK (loan)	2022–23	Austrian Bundesliga	12	0	1	0	—		—		13	0
LASK	2023–24	Austrian Bundesliga	25	0	3	0	—		6 (Note: Appearances in UEFA Europa League)	1	34	1
LASK	2024–25	Austrian Bundesliga	12	0	2	0	—		6 (Note: One appearance in UEFA Europa League, five appearances in UEFA Conference League)	0	20	0
LASK	Total		49	0	5	0	—		12	1	67	1
Plymouth Argyle	2024–25	Championship	11	1	2	1	—		—		13	2
Stoke City	2025–26	Championship	16	0	2	0	1	0	—		19	0
Stoke City	2026–27	Championship	10	0	0	0	1	0	—		11	0
Stoke City	Total		26	0	2	0	2	0	—		30	0
Career total			170	3	16	2	2	0	17	1	205	6

=== International ===
As of match played 10 June 2025

Appearances and goals by national team and year
National team	Year	Apps	Goals
Ukraine	2024	7	0
Ukraine	2025	1	0
Total		8	0
