= 2023–24 LASK season =

LASK
2023–24 season
- Manager: Thomas Sageder
- Stadium: Raiffeisen Arena
- Austrian Bundesliga: 3rd
- Austrian Cup: Quarter-finals
- UEFA Europa League: Group stage
- Top goalscorer: League: Marin Ljubičić (12); All: Marin Ljubičić (15)
- Biggest win: SC Röfix Röthis 0–6 LASK
- Biggest defeat: Red Bull Salzburg 7–1 LASK
Home colours	Away colours	Third colours

The 2023–24 LASK season was the club's 116th season in existence and its seventh consecutive season in the Austrian Bundesliga, the top division of Austrian football. In addition to the domestic league, LASK participated in this season's edition of the Austrian Cup and the UEFA Europa League. The season covers the period from 1 July 2023 to 30 June 2024.

== Players ==
=== First-team squad ===
As of 17 August 2023

Note: Flags indicate national team as defined under FIFA eligibility rules; some limited exceptions apply. Players may hold more than one non-FIFA nationality.

No.	Pos.	Nation	Player
1	GK	AUT	Tobias Lawal
2	DF	USA	George Bello
4	DF	UKR	Maksym Talovyerov (on loan from Slavia Prague)
5	DF	GER	Philipp Ziereis
6	DF	AUT	Philipp Wiesinger
7	MF	AUT	Rene Renner
8	MF	AUT	Peter Michorl
9	FW	CRO	Marin Ljubičić
10	MF	AUT	Robert Žulj (captain)
11	FW	SEN	Moussa Koné
14	MF	AUT	Husein Balić
15	FW	AUT	Tobias Anselm
16	DF	PAN	Andrés Andrade
17	FW	NGR	Moses Usor (on loan from Slavia Prague)
18	MF	SRB	Branko Jovičić
19	FW	FRA	Lenny Pintor

No.	Pos.	Nation	Player
21	MF	AUT	Ivan Ljubic
22	DF	MNE	Filip Stojković
23	FW	GHA	Ibrahim Mustapha
24	FW	AUT	Elias Havel
25	DF	GER	Sanoussy Ba (on loan from RB Leipzig)
26	MF	CZE	Filip Twardzik
27	MF	AUT	Thomas Goiginger
28	GK	AUT	Jörg Siebenhandl
29	FW	AUT	Florian Flecker
30	MF	AUT	Sascha Horvath
31	DF	GUF	Yannis Letard
33	DF	AUT	Felix Luckeneder
37	GK	AUT	Lukas Jungwirth
44	FW	FRA	Adil Taoui
55	MF	GAM	Ebrima Darboe (on loan from Roma)

=== Out on loan ===
Note: Flags indicate national team as defined under FIFA eligibility rules; some limited exceptions apply. Players may hold more than one non-FIFA nationality.

No.	Pos.	Nation	Player
—	MF	AUT	Marco Sulzner (at Amstetten until 30 June 2024)

== Transfers ==
=== In ===
Pos.	Player	Transferred from	Fee	Date	Source
FW	(Austria) Elias Havel	(Austria) Liefering	Free	1 July 2023	
FW	(Senegal) Moussa Koné	(France) Nîmes Olympique	Free	1 July 2023	
DF	(Panama) Andrés Andrade	(Germany) Arminia Bielefeld	€500,000	1 July 2023	
DF	(Ukraine) Maksym Taloverov	(Czech Republic) Slavia Prague	Loan + €400,000	17 August 2023	
MF	(Nigeria) Moses Usor	(Czech Republic) Slavia Prague	€2,000,000	1 January 2024	

=== Out ===
Pos.	Player	Transferred to	Fee	Date	Source
FW	(Ivory Coast) Oumar Sako	(Bulgaria) Arda Kardzhali	€150,000	1 July 2023	
FW	(Austria) Thomas Sabitzer	(Austria) Wolfsberger AC	€200,000	1 July 2023	
FW	(Greece) Efthymis Koulouris	(Poland) Pogoń Szczecin	€900,000	1 July 2023	
MF	(Japan) Keito Nakamura	(France) Stade de Reims	€12,000,000	10 August 2023	

== Pre-season and friendlies ==
Win Draw Loss Fixtures

24 June 2023 Friendly	SPG Pregarten	0–7	LASK	Pregarten
18:00 CEST (UTC+2)				Stadium: Kornspitz-Arena

1 July 2023 Friendly	LASK	5–2	Flyeralarm Admira	Pasching
11:30 CEST (UTC+2)				Stadium: voestalpine Stadium

4 July 2023 Friendly	1860 Munich	0–2	LASK	Windischgarsten
17:00 CEST (UTC+2)

8 July 2023 Friendly	St. Gallen	1–1	LASK	Jenbach
16:00 CEST (UTC+2)				Stadium: Stadion Jenbach

14 July 2023 Friendly	LASK	4–2	Debrecen	Pasching
17:00 CEST (UTC+2)				Stadium: voestalpine Stadium

15 July 2023 Friendly	LASK	4–2	First Vienna	Linz
16:00 CEST (UTC+2)				Stadium: Raiffeisen Arena

6 September 2023 Friendly	LASK	5–4	České Budějovice	Pasching
11:00 CEST (UTC+2)		Report		Stadium: voestalpine Stadium

11 October 2023 Friendly	LASK	1–1	Železiarne Podbrezová	Pasching
15:00 CEST (UTC+2)		Report		Stadium: voestalpine Stadium

15 November 2023 Friendly	LASK	Cancelled	SV Horn
15:00 CET (UTC+1)

10 January 2024 Friendly	LASK	2–1	Hansa Rostock	Belek, Turkey
15:00 TRT (UTC+3)	Goiginger 67' (pen.); Stojković 87'		Perea 49'

14 January 2024 Friendly	LASK	1–3	FCSB	Belek, Turkey
11:00 TRT (UTC+3)

18 January 2024 Friendly	LASK	v	Lech Poznań	Belek, Turkey
--:-- TRT (UTC+3)

26 January 2024 Friendly	LASK	v	Železiarne Podbrezová	TBD
--:-- CET (UTC+1)

== Competitions ==
=== Overview ===
Competition	First match	Last match	Starting round	Final position	Record							
Competition	First match	Last match	Starting round	Final position	Pld	W	D	L	GF	GA	GD	Win %
Austrian Bundesliga	28 July 2023	19 May 2024	Matchday 1	3rd	32	14	10	8	43	33	+10	43.75
Austrian Cup	21 July 2023	2 February 2024	First round	Quarter-finals	4	2	1	1	8	3	+5	50.00
UEFA Europa League	24 August 2023	14 December 2023	Play-off round	Group stage	8	2	1	5	9	13	−4	25.00
Total					44	18	12	14	60	49	+11	40.91

Source: Soccerway

=== Austrian Bundesliga ===
==== League table ====
Pos	Team	Pld	W	D	L	GF	GA	GD	Pts	Qualification
1	Red Bull Salzburg	22	15	5	2	45	12	+33	50	Qualification for the Championship round
2	Sturm Graz	22	13	7	2	37	15	+22	46	Qualification for the Championship round
3	LASK	22	9	8	5	26	18	+8	35	Qualification for the Championship round
4	Austria Klagenfurt	22	8	10	4	29	27	+2	34 (Note: Head to head points: Klagenfurt 4, TSV Hartberg 1.)	Qualification for the Championship round
5	Hartberg	22	9	7	6	33	28	+5	34	Qualification for the Championship round
6	Rapid Wien	22	8	9	5	38	21	+17	33 (Note: Head to head points: Rapid 4, Austria Wien 1.)	Qualification for the Championship round
7	Austria Wien	22	9	6	7	25	22	+3	33	Qualification for the Relegation round
8	Wolfsberger AC	22	8	6	8	29	32	−3	30	Qualification for the Relegation round
9	SCR Altach	22	4	7	11	17	30	−13	19	Qualification for the Relegation round
10	Blau-Weiß Linz	22	4	7	11	22	38	−16	19	Qualification for the Relegation round
11	WSG Tirol	22	4	2	16	20	42	−22	14	Qualification for the Relegation round
12	Austria Lustenau	22	2	4	16	13	49	−36	10	Qualification for the Relegation round

Source: Austrian Football Bundesliga
Rules for classification: 1) Points; 2) Head-to-head record; 3) Goal difference; 4) Goals scored; 5) Matches won; 6) Away matches won; 7) Away goals scored.
Notes:

Pos	Team	Pld	W	D	L	GF	GA	GD	Pts	Qualification	STU	RBS	LASK	RWI	HAR	AKL
1	Sturm Graz (C)	32	19	10	3	56	23	+33	44	Qualification for the Champions League league stage	—	0–1	1–0	1–0	1–1	2–0
2	Red Bull Salzburg	32	20	7	5	74	29	+45	42	Qualification for the Champions League third qualifying round (Note: Since the Europa League winners, Atalanta qualified for the Champions League via league position, Red Bull Salzburg were promoted from the Champions League second qualifying round to the third qualifying round as one of the two teams with the highest coefficient in the second qualifying round.)	2–2	—	7–1	1–1	5–1	4–2
3	LASK	32	14	10	8	43	33	+10	34	Qualification for the Europa League play-off round (Note: The 2023–24 Austrian Cup winners qualified for the Europa League play-off round. Since the cup winners (Sturm Graz) qualified based on league position, the Europa League spot was passed to the third-placed team.)	2–2	3–1	—	5–0	1–3	1–0
4	Rapid Wien	32	11	12	9	47	35	+12	28	Qualification for the Europa League second qualifying round	1–3	2–0	0–0	—	0–3	1–1
5	Hartberg	32	12	9	11	49	52	−3	28	Qualification for the Conference League play-offs	1–3	1–5	1–2	0–3	—	3–2
6	Austria Klagenfurt	32	9	12	11	40	50	−10	22		0–4	4–3	0–2	0–1	2–2	—

Source: Austrian Football Bundesliga
Legend: Blue = home team win; Yellow = draw; Red = away team win.
Rules for classification: 1) Points; 2) Points with (possible) half points subtracted due to rounding; 3) Head-to-head points; 4) Head-to-head goal difference; 5) Head-to-head goals scored; 6) Goal difference; 7) Goals scored; 8) Matches won; 9) Away matches won; 10) Away goals scored.
(C) Champions
Notes:

Pos	Team	Pld	W	D	L	GF	GA	GD	Pts	Qualification	WOL	AWI	BWL	ALT	WAT	LUS
1	Wolfsberger AC	32	12	10	10	41	39	+2	31	Qualification for the Conference League play-offs	—	0–1	0–2	0–0	3–1	1–1
2	Austria Wien (O)	32	12	10	10	35	34	+1	29	Qualification for the Conference League play-offs	0–4	—	0–0	2–2	3–0	1–1
3	Blau-Weiß Linz	32	7	11	14	33	48	−15	22		0–0	1–2	—	2–1	3–2	0–0
4	Rheindorf Altach	32	6	13	13	27	40	−13	21		0–1	1–1	2–2	—	0–0	2–2
5	WSG Tirol	32	7	5	20	29	55	−26	19		1–1	1–0	2–1	0–1	—	0–0
6	Austria Lustenau (R)	32	4	9	19	22	58	−36	16	Relegation to Austrian Football Second League	1–2	2–0	1–0	0–1	1–2	—

Legend: Blue = home team win; Yellow = draw; Red = away team win.
Rules for classification: 1) Points; 2) Points with (possible) half points subtracted due to rounding; 3) Head-to-head points; 4) Head-to-head goal difference; 5) Head-to-head goals scored; 6) Head-to-head away goals scored; 7) Goal difference; 8) Goals scored; 9) Matches won; 10) Away matches won; 11) Away goals scored.
(O) Play-off winners; (R) Relegated

==== Results summary ====
Overall								Home						Away					
Pld	W	D	L	GF	GA	GD	Pts	W	D	L	GF	GA	GD	W	D	L	GF	GA	GD
17	9	5	3	24	14	+10	32	6	2	0	12	2	+10	3	3	3	12	12	0

Last updated: 16 December 2023.

==== Results by round ====
Round	1	2	3	4	5	6	7	8	9	10	11	12	13	14	15	16	17	18	19	20	21	22
Ground	H	A	H	A	H	H	A	H	A	H	A	A	H	A	H	A	A	H	A	H	A	H
Result	D	L	W	D	W	W	W	D	L	W	W	D	W	L	W	D	W					
Position	8	10	7	6	5	3	3	3	3	3	3	3	3	3	3	3	3					

Updated to match(es) played on November 2023. Source:
A = Away; H = Home; W = Win; D = Draw; L = Loss

==== Matches ====
The league fixtures were unveiled on 27 June 2023.

28 July 2023 1	LASK	1–1	Rapid Wien	Linz
19:30 CEST (UTC+2)	Luckeneder 90+5'	Report	Seidl 24'	Stadium: Raiffeisen Arena; Attendance: 14,575; Referee: Christian-Petru Ciochirca

5 August 2023 2	Sturm Graz	2–0	LASK	Graz
18:30 CEST (UTC+2)	Horvat 27'; Włodarczyk 77'	Report		Stadium: Merkur Arena; Attendance: 14,740; Referee: Sebastian Gishamer

12 August 2023 3	LASK	2–0	Blau-Weiß Linz	Linz
18:30 CEST (UTC+2)	Ziereis 11'; Žulj 50'	Report		Stadium: Raiffeisen Arena; Attendance: 17,478; Referee: Alexander Harkam

19 August 2023 4	WSG Tirol	1–1	LASK	Innsbruck
16:00 CEST (UTC+2)	Prelec 16'	Report	Havel 70'	Stadium: Tivoli Stadion Tirol; Attendance: 1,889; Referee: Gerhard Grobelnik

27 August 2023 5	LASK	2–0	Austria Wien	Linz
16:00 CEST (UTC+2)	Žulj 32', 58'	Report		Stadium: Raiffeisen Arena; Attendance: 11,373; Referee: Walter Altman

3 September 2023 6	LASK	2–0	Austria Lustenau	Linz
16:00 CEST (UTC+2)	Ziereis 79'; Goiginger 90+6'	Report		Stadium: Raiffeisen Arena; Attendance: 9,547; Referee: Markus Hameter

16 September 2023 7	Austria Klagenfurt	1–3	LASK	Klagenfurt
16:00 CEST (UTC+2)	Bonnah 56'	Report	Ljubičić 36'; Flecker 40'; Havel 44'	Stadium: 28 Black Arena; Attendance: 3,800; Referee: Sebastian Gishamer

24 September 2023 8	LASK	0–0	TSV Hartberg	Linz
13:30 CEST (UTC+2)		Report		Stadium: Raiffeisen Arena; Attendance: 9,922; Referee: Christopher Jäger

30 September 2023 9	Wolfsberger AC	2–1	LASK	Wolfsberg
16:00 CEST (UTC+2)	Bamba 25'; Rieder 40'	Report	Goiginger 84' (pen.)	Stadium: Lavanttal-Arena; Attendance: 3,586; Referee: Harald Lechner

8 October 2023 10	LASK	1–0	Rheindorf Altach	Linz
13:30 CEST (UTC+2)	Žulj 82'	Report		Stadium: Raiffeisen Arena; Attendance: 9,862; Referee: Julian Weinberger

21 October 2023 11	Red Bull Salzburg	0–1	LASK	Salzburg
16:00 CEST (UTC+2)		Report	Žulj 34'	Stadium: Red Bull Arena; Attendance: 15,625; Referee: Alexander Harkam

29 October 2023 12	Rapid Wien	3–3	LASK	Vienna
16:00 CEST (UTC+2)	Grgić 15'; Grüll 90+1' (pen.); Gale 90+6'	Report	Ljubičić 22', 73'; Balić 90+5'	Stadium: Allianz Stadion; Attendance: 19,149; Referee: Walter Altman

5 November 2023 13	LASK	3–1	Sturm Graz	Linz
15:00 CET (UTC+1)	Usor 36'; Stojković 45+1'; Žulj 90+1'	Report	Włodarczyk 60'	Stadium: Raiffeisen Arena; Attendance: 15,249; Referee: Markus Hameter

12 November 2023 14	Blau-Weiß Linz	2–0	LASK	Linz
12:30 CET (UTC+1)	Ronivaldo 29'; Feiertag 82'	Report		Stadium: Hofmann Personal Stadion; Attendance: 5,595; Referee: Harald Lechner

25 November 2023 15	LASK	1–0	WSG Tirol	Linz
15:00 CET (UTC+1)	Žulj 14'	Report		Stadium: Raiffeisen Arena; Attendance: 10,296; Referee: Jakob Semler

3 December 2023 16	Austria Wien	0–0	LASK	Vienna
15:00 CET (UTC+1)		Report		Stadium: Generali Arena; Attendance: 10,710; Referee: Sebastian Gishamer

9 December 2023 17	Austria Lustenau	1–3	LASK	Lustenau
15:00 CET (UTC+1)	Diaby 39'	Report	Boateng 61' (o.g.); Usor 72'; Ljubičić 90'	Stadium: Planet Pure Stadion; Attendance: 3,072; Referee: Harald Lechner

10 February 2024 18	LASK	2–2	Austria Klagenfurt	Linz
TBD CET (UTC+1)		Report		Stadium: Raiffeisen Arena

17 February 2024 19	TSV Hartberg	0–0	LASK	Hartberg
TBD CET (UTC+1)		Report		Stadium: Profertil Arena Hartberg

24 February 2024 20	LASK	0–1	Wolfsberger AC	Linz
TBD CET (UTC+1)		Report		Stadium: Raiffeisen Arena

2 March 2024 21	Rheindorf Altach	0–0	LASK	Altach
TBD CET (UTC+1)		Report		Stadium: CASHPOINT Arena

9 March 2024 22	LASK	0–1	Red Bull Salzburg	Linz
TBD CEST (UTC+2)		Report		Stadium: Raiffeisen Arena

==== Championship round ====
Pos	Team	Pld	W	D	L	GF	GA	GD	Pts	Qualification
1	Sturm Graz (C)	32	19	10	3	56	23	+33	44	Qualification for the Champions League league stage
2	Red Bull Salzburg	32	20	7	5	74	29	+45	42	Qualification for the Champions League third qualifying round (Note: Since the Europa League winners, Atalanta qualified for the Champions League via league position, Red Bull Salzburg were promoted from the Champions League second qualifying round to the third qualifying round as one of the two teams with the highest coefficient in the second qualifying round.)
3	LASK	32	14	10	8	43	33	+10	34	Qualification for the Europa League play-off round (Note: The 2023–24 Austrian Cup winners qualified for the Europa League play-off round. Since the cup winners (Sturm Graz) qualified based on league position, the Europa League spot was passed to the third-placed team.)
4	Rapid Wien	32	11	12	9	47	35	+12	28	Qualification for the Europa League second qualifying round
5	Hartberg	32	12	9	11	49	52	−3	28	Qualification for the Conference League play-offs
6	Austria Klagenfurt	32	9	12	11	40	50	−10	22	

Source: Austrian Football Bundesliga
Rules for classification: 1) Points; 2) Points with (possible) half points subtracted due to rounding; 3) Head-to-head points; 4) Head-to-head goal difference; 5) Head-to-head goals scored; 6) Goal difference; 7) Goals scored; 8) Matches won; 9) Away matches won; 10) Away goals scored.
(C) Champions

==== Matches ====
15 March 2024 23	Rapid Wien	0–0	LASK

31 March 2024 24	LASK	1–0	Klagenfurt

7 April 2024 25	Sturm Graz	1–0	LASK

12 April 2024 26	LASK	3–1	Red bull Salzburg

21 April 2024 27	LASK	1–3	Hartberg

24 April 2024 28	Hartberg	1–2	LASK

28 April 2024 29	LASK	5–0	Rapid Wien

5 May 2024 30	Klagenfurt	0–2	LASK

12 May 2024 31	LASK	2–2	Sturm Graz

19 May 2024 32	Red Bull Salzburg	7–1	LASK

==== Results summary ====
Overall								Home						Away					
Pld	W	D	L	GF	GA	GD	Pts	W	D	L	GF	GA	GD	W	D	L	GF	GA	GD
0	0	0	0	0	0	0	0	0	0	0	0	0	0	0	0	0	0	0	0

Last updated: 12 May 2024.
Source: Worldfootball

==== Results by round ====
Round	1
Ground	
Result	
Position	

Updated to match(es) played on 12 May 2024. Source: Worldfootball
A = Away; H = Home; W = Win; D = Draw; L = Loss

=== Austrian Cup ===
The draw for the season's first round took place on 25 June.

21 July 2023 First round	SC Röfix Röthis	0–6	LASK	Röthis
17:00 CEST (UTC+2)		Report	Ljubičić 24'; Koné 50', 57'; Mustapha 69'; Ziereis 84'; Goiginger 86'	Stadium: Sportplatz an der Ratz; Attendance: 1,000; Referee: Walter Altman

27 September 2023 Second round	SC Imst	0–3	LASK	Imst
17:30 CEST (UTC+2)		Report	Luckeneder 8'; Goiginger 71' (pen.); Ba 85'	Stadium: Velly Arena Imst; Attendance: 1,500; Referee: Jakob Rigger

1 November 2023 Third round	Kapfenberger SV	0–0 (a.e.t.) (5–6 p)	LASK	Kapfenberg
17:00 CET (UTC+1)		Report		Stadium: Franz Fekete Stadium; Attendance: 2,400; Referee: Arnse Talic
	Penalties
	Pichorner (penalty scored); Szerencsi (penalty scored); Lucho (penalty scored); Murza (penalty scored); Seidl (penalty scored); Walchhütter (penalty missed)		(penalty scored) Michorl; (penalty scored) Koné; (penalty scored) Andrade; (penalty scored) Talovyerov; (penalty scored) Usor; (penalty scored) Pintor

2 February 2024 Quarter-finals	LASK	2–3	Red Bull Salzburg	Linz
17:00 CET (UTC+1)				Stadium: Raiffeisen Arena

=== UEFA Europa League ===
==== Play-off round ====
24 August 2023 First leg	LASK (Austria)	2–1	(Bosnia and Herzegovina) Zrinjski Mostar	Linz
20:00 CEST (UTC+2)	Žulj 4', 12'	Report	Bilbija 71'	Stadium: Raiffeisen Arena; Attendance: 8,300; Referee: Orel Grinfeld (Israel)

31 August 2023 Second leg	Zrinjski Mostar (Bosnia and Herzegovina)	1–1 (2–3 agg.)	(Austria) LASK	Mostar, Bosnia and Herzegovina
20:00 CEST (UTC+2)	Bilbija 38' (pen.)	Report	Jovičić 52'	Stadium: Stadion pod Bijelim Brijegom; Attendance: 6,520; Referee: Tiago Martins (Portugal)

==== Group stage ====
The draw for the group stage was held on 1 September 2023.

Pos	Team	Pld	W	D	L	GF	GA	GD	Pts	Qualification	LIV	TOU	USG	LAS
1	(England) Liverpool	6	4	0	2	17	7	+10	12	Advance to round of 16	—	5–1	2–0	4–0
2	(France) Toulouse	6	3	2	1	8	9	−1	11	Advance to knockout round play-offs	3–2	—	0–0	1–0
3	(Belgium) Union Saint-Gilloise	6	2	2	2	5	8	−3	8	Transfer to Europa Conference League	2–1	1–1	—	2–1
4	(Austria) LASK	6	1	0	5	6	12	−6	3		1–3	1–2	3–0	—

Source: UEFA
Rules for classification: Group stage tiebreakers

21 September 2023 1	LASK (Austria)	1–3	(England) Liverpool	Linz
17:45 CEST (UTC+2)	Flecker 14'	Report	Núñez 56' (pen.); Díaz 63'; Salah 88'	Stadium: Raiffeisen Arena; Attendance: 18,091; Referee: Marco Di Bello (Italy)

5 October 2023 2	Toulouse (France)	1–0	(Austria) LASK	Toulouse, France
20:00 CEST (UTC+2)	Suazo 31'			Stadium: Stadium de Toulouse; Attendance: 29,33; Referee: Nick Walsh (Scotland)

26 October 2023 3	Union Saint-Gilloise (Belgium)	2–1	(Austria) LASK	Brussels, Belgium
20:00 CEST (UTC+2)	Puertas 84' (pen.); Burgess 90+4'	Report	Usor 24'	Stadium: Constant Vanden Stock Stadium; Attendance: 11,426; Referee: Atilla Karaoğlan (Turkey)
Note: Union Saint-Gilloise hosted the match at the Constant Vanden Stock Stadium, instead of their regular stadium, the Joseph Marien Stadium in Brussels, which did not meet UEFA requirements.

9 November 2023 4	LASK (Austria)	3–0	(Belgium) Union Saint-Gilloise	Linz
16:45 CET (UTC+1)	Horvath 25' (pen.); Talovyerov 45+4'; Žulj 77'			Stadium: Raiffeisen Arena; Attendance: 15,900; Referee: Simone Sozza (Italy)

30 November 2023 5	Liverpool (England)	4–0	(Austria) LASK	Liverpool, England
19:00 CET (UTC+1)	Díaz 12'; Gakpo 15', 90+2'; Salah 51' (pen.)	Report		Stadium: Anfield; Attendance: 49,666; Referee: Urs Schnyder (Switzerland)

14 December 2023 6	LASK (Austria)	1–2	(France) Toulouse	Linz
16:45 CET (UTC+1)	Ljubičić 61'	Report	Dallinga 54'; Suazo 83'	Stadium: Raiffeisen Arena; Attendance: 16,100; Referee: Fabio Maresca (Italy)
