= Husein Balić =

Austrian footballer

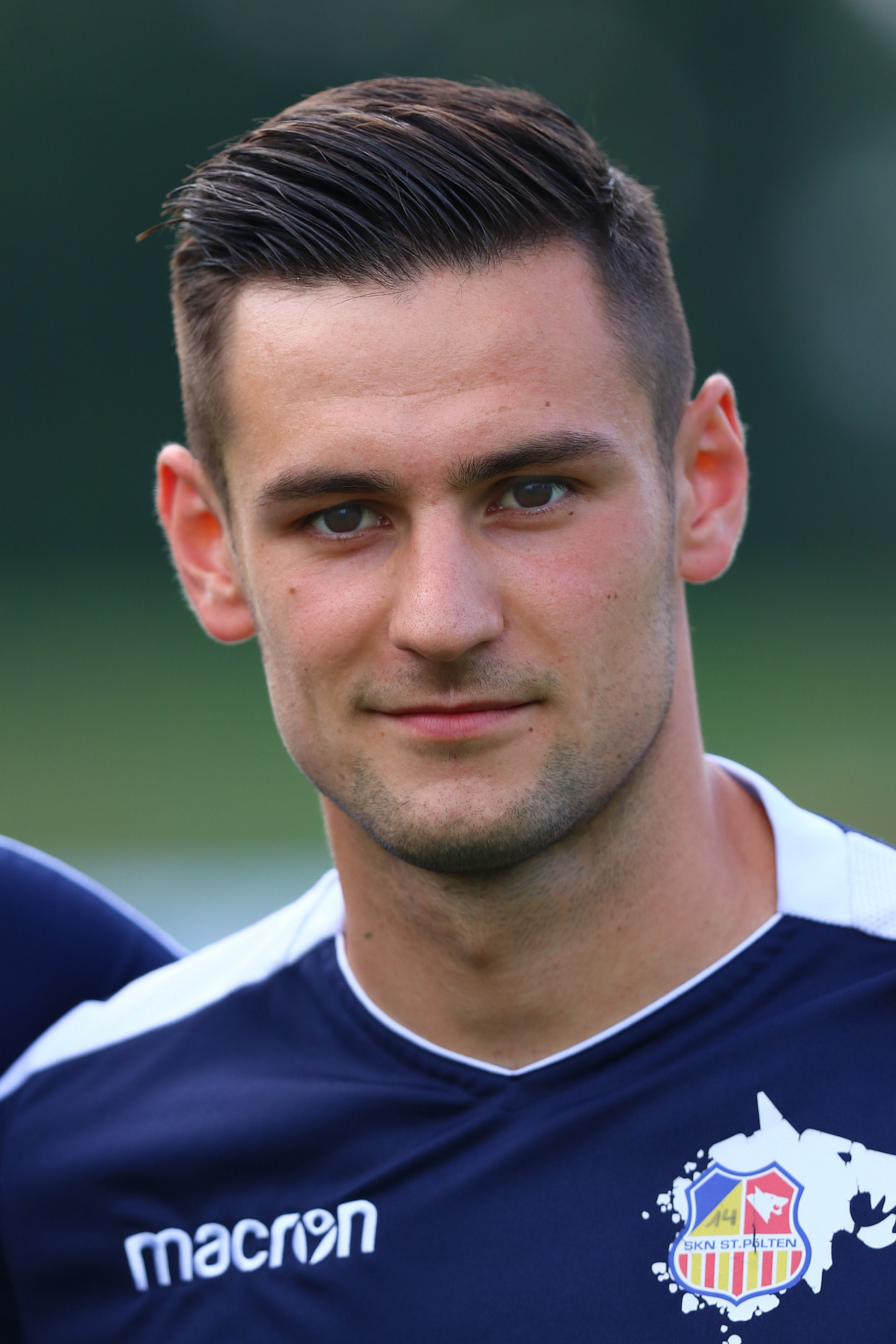
- Balić with St. Pölten in 2018

Personal information
- Date of birth: 15 February 1996 (age 30)
- Place of birth: Steyr, Austria
- Height: 1.83 m (6 ft 0 in)
- Position: Winger

Team information
- Current team: WSG Tirol
- Number: 18

Youth career
- 2006–2010: SK Vorwärts Steyr
- 2010–2013: AKA Linz

Senior career*
Years	Team	Apps	(Gls)
2013–2015	Vorwärts Steyr	42	(4)
2015–2018	SSt. Pölten II	30	(6)
2015–2019	St. Pölten	61	(7)
2020–2024	LASK	77	(10)
2023	→ Rheindorf Altach (loan)	12	(0)
2024–2026	ŁKS Łódź	42	(6)
2025	ŁKS Łódź II	1	(0)
2026–	WSG Tirol	1	(0)

International career
2019	Austria U21	5	(1)
2020	Austria	1	(0)
- * Club domestic league appearances and goals as of 08:30, 3 August 2026 (UTC)

Husein Balić (born 15 February 1996) is an Austrian professional footballer who plays as a winger for Austrian Bundesliga club WSG Tirol.

== Club career ==
He made his Austrian Football Bundesliga debut for SKN St. Pölten on 23 September 2017 in a game against FC Admira Wacker Mödling.

=== LASK ===
On 23 December 2019, LASK confirmed that Balić had joined the club on a contract until the summer 2024.

=== ŁKS Łódź ===
On 10 January 2024, Balić joined Polish Ekstraklasa side ŁKS Łódź on a contract until June 2025, with an option for another year. He scored on his debut in a 2–1 away league defeat against Korona Kielce on 12 February. His contract was mutually terminated on 6 February 2026; in his two-year stint at the club, Balić made 45 appearances and scored six goals for the senior team, and featured once for the reserve team.

== International career ==
Born in Austria, Balić is of Bosnian descent and was born to a Bosniak family. He made his debut for Austria national football team on 11 November 2020 in a friendly game against Luxembourg. He substituted Valentino Lazaro in the 58th minute.

== Career statistics ==
=== Club ===
As of match played 8 November 2025

Appearances and goals by club, season and competition
Club	Season	League			National cup (Note: Includes Austrian Cup, Polish Cup)		Other		Total	
Club	Season	Division	Apps	Goals	Apps	Goals	Apps	Goals	Apps	Goals
Vorwärts Steyr	2013–14	Austrian Regionalliga Central	26	2	1	0	—		27	2
Vorwärts Steyr	2014–15	Austrian Regionalliga Central	16	2	2	0	—		18	2
Vorwärts Steyr	Total		42	4	3	0	0	0	45	4
St. Pölten	2017–18	Austrian Bundesliga	14	0	0	0	1 (Note: Appearance in the Austrian Bundesliga relegation play-offs)	0	15	0
St. Pölten	2018–19	Austrian Bundesliga	29	3	4	5	—		33	8
St. Pölten	2019–20	Austrian Bundesliga	18	4	3	0	—		21	4
St. Pölten	Total		61	7	7	5	1	0	69	12
LASK	2019–20	Austrian Bundesliga	11	3	1	1	4 (Note: Appearances in UEFA Europa League)	0	16	4
LASK	2020–21	Austrian Bundesliga	29	3	5	3	7	2	41	8
LASK	2021–22	Austrian Bundesliga	27	3	3	1	11 (Note: Four appearances in UEFA Champions League, six appearances in UEFA Europa Conference League, one appearance in Austrian Bundesliga Europa Conference League play-offs)	4	41	8
LASK	2022–23	Austrian Bundesliga	5	0	2	0	—		7	0
LASK	2023–24	Austrian Bundesliga	5	1	1	0	1 (Note: Appearance in UEFA Europa Conference League)	0	7	1
LASK	Total		77	10	12	5	23	6	112	21
Rheindorf Altach (loan)	2022–23	Austrian Bundesliga	12	0	0	0	—		12	0
ŁKS Łódź	2023–24	Ekstraklasa	13	3	—		—		13	3
ŁKS Łódź	2024–25	I liga	18	2	2	0	—		20	2
ŁKS Łódź	2025–26	I liga	11	1	1	0	—		12	1
ŁKS Łódź	Total		42	6	3	0	0	0	45	6
ŁKS Łódź II	2024–25	II liga	1	0	0	0	—		1	0
Career totals			235	27	25	10	24	6	284	43

=== International ===
Appearances and goals by national team and year
National team	Year	Apps	Goals
Austria
Austria	2020	1	0
Total		1	0
