= Elias Havel =

Austrian footballer (born 2003)

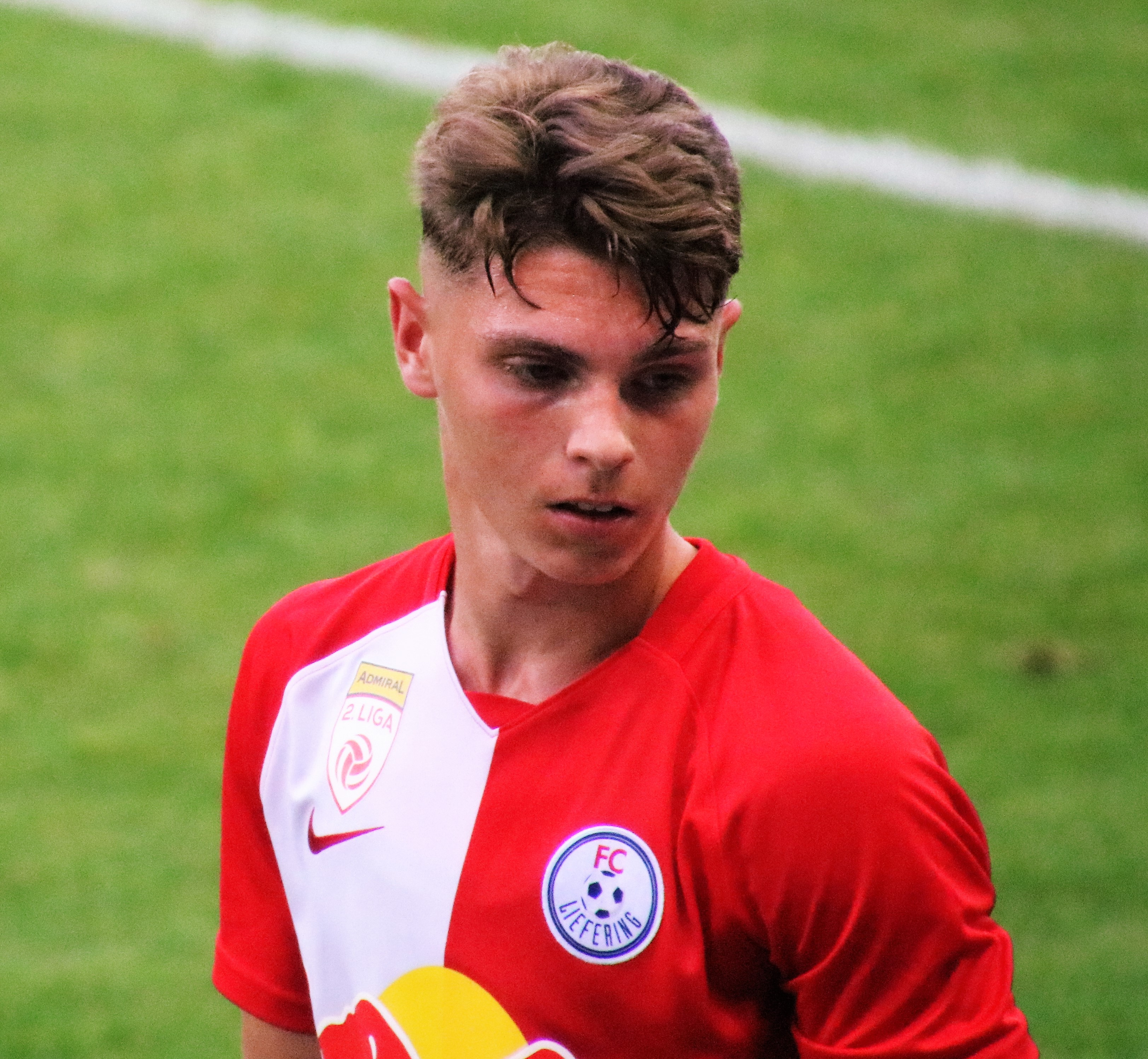
- Havel with Liefering in 2021

Personal information
- Full name: Elias Havel
- Date of birth: 16 April 2003 (age 23)
- Place of birth: Vienna, Austria
- Height: 1.82 m (6 ft 0 in)
- Position: Forward

Team information
- Current team: Genoa
- Number: 17

Youth career
- 2010–2012: 1. Simmeringer SC
- 2012–2013: First Vienna FC
- 2013–2017: Austria Wien
- 2017–2020: Red Bull Salzburg

Senior career*
Years	Team	Apps	(Gls)
2021–2023	FC Liefering	61	(13)
2023	LASK II	1	(0)
2023–2026	LASK	19	(2)
2024–2026	→ TSV Hartberg (loan)	47	(16)
2026–	Genoa	0	(0)

International career^{‡}
2018	Austria U15	1	(0)
2019	Austria U17	4	(2)
2021	Austria U18	1	(0)
2021	Austria U19	6	(0)
2023	Austria U21	2	(0)
- * Club domestic league appearances and goals as of 10 June 2026 ‡ National team caps and goals as of 23:16, 30 November 2023 (UTC)

Elias Havel (born 16 April 2003) is an Austrian professional footballer who plays as a striker for Serie A club Genoa.

== Club career ==
Havel is a youth product of the academies of 1. Simmeringer SC, First Vienna FC, Austria Wien and Red Bull Salzburg. In January 2021, he was promoted to Red Bull Salzburg's reserve team FC Liefering and made his debut in the 2. Liga. On 27 June 2023, he transferred to the Austrian Bundesliga side LASK on a contract until 2027. On 20 June 2024, Havel joined fellow Austrian Bundesliga club TSV Hartberg on a season-long loan deal.

On 10 July 2026, Havel signed with Genoa in Italy.

== International career ==
Havel is a youth international for Austria. He was called up to the Austria U21s in September 2023.

== Career statistics ==
As of match played 19 May 2024

Appearances and goals by club, season and competition
Club	Season	League			National Cup		Continental		Total	
Club	Season	Division	Apps	Goals	Apps	Goals	Apps	Goals	Apps	Goals
FC Liefering	2020–21	2. Liga	16	3	—		—		16	3
FC Liefering	2021–22	2. Liga	16	1	—		—		16	1
FC Liefering	2022–23	2. Liga	29	9	—		—		29	9
FC Liefering	Total		61	13	—		—		61	13
LASK II	2023–24	Austrian Regionalliga Central	1	0	—		—		1	0
LASK	2023–24	Austrian Bundesliga	19	2	1	0	5 (Note: Appearances in the UEFA Europa League)	0	25	2
Career Total			81	15	1	0	5	0	87	15

== Honours ==
FC Liefering

- Austrian Football First League runner-up: 2021
