= Filip Stojković =

Footballer (born 1993)

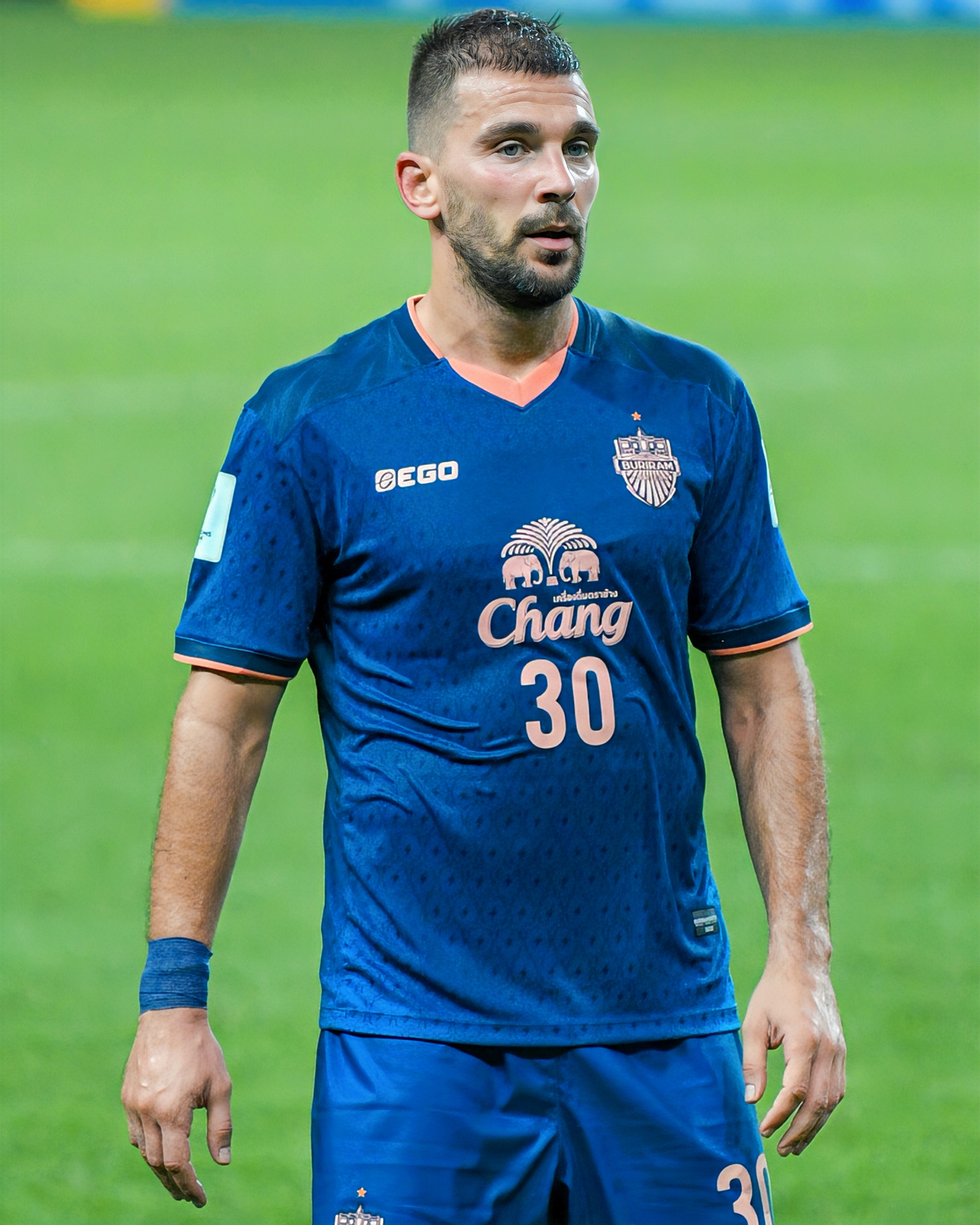
- Stojković with Buriram United in 2025

Personal information
- Date of birth: 22 January 1993 (age 33)
- Place of birth: Ćuprija, FR Yugoslavia
- Height: 1.74 m (5 ft 9 in)
- Position: Right-back

Team information
- Current team: Buriram United
- Number: 30

Youth career
- Bukovik Ražanj
- 2006–2011: Red Star Belgrade

Senior career*
Years	Team	Apps	(Gls)
2009–2012	Red Star Belgrade	1	(0)
2009–2011	→ Sopot (loan)	44	(0)
2012	→ Banat Zrenjanin (loan)	11	(0)
2013–2016	Čukarički	103	(2)
2016–2017	1860 Munich	8	(0)
2017–2019	Red Star Belgrade	54	(2)
2019–2022	Rapid Wien	73	(2)
2022–2025	LASK	66	(2)
2025–	Buriram United	2	(0)

International career^{‡}
2009–2010	Serbia U17 (Note: Only official UEFA matches included)	7	(0)
2011–2012	Serbia U19	8	(0)
2013–2015	Serbia U21	8	(0)
2016–2019	Montenegro	15	(0)
- * Club domestic league appearances and goals as of 1 December 2024 ‡ National team caps and goals as of 23 June 2018

Filip Stojković (Serbian Cyrillic: Филип Стојковић, pronounced [fǐlip stǒːjkoʋitɕ]; born 22 January 1993) is a professional footballer who plays as a right-back for Thai League 1 club Buriram United. Born in Serbia, Stojković represented the Montenegro national team.

== Club career ==
=== Early career ===
Born in Ćuprija, Stojković grown up in Ražanj, where he started playing football with the local football club Bukovik. Later he moved to Red Star Belgrade youth academy, and signed his first professional contract with the club in June 2009, on a three-year deal. He spent the next two seasons on loan at FK Sopot, playing regularly in the Serbian League Belgrade. In 2011, Stojković returned to his parent club and made his Serbian SuperLiga debut in a 4–0 home win over Smederevo in March 2012. He also recorded three appearances in the Serbian Cup, as they won the trophy. During the 2012–13 season, Stojković played on loan at Banat Zrenjanin and subsequently for Čukarički.

=== Čukarički ===
After transferring to Čukarički, Stojković established himself as a regular starter, helping them win the Serbian Cup in the 2014–15 season. He was also named in the Serbian SuperLiga Team of the Season in 2015 and 2016. In his last season at Čukarički, Stojković made six assists over 34 games played.

=== 1860 Munich ===
In July 2016, Stojković signed a three-year contract with German club 1860 Munich. The transfer was approximately €750,000, and the coach at the time was Kosta Runjaić. The team at the time included one of Stojković's teammates from Montenegro's national selection, Stefan Mugoša. In spite of coming to Munich injured, Stojković initially saw playing time, but fell out of rhythm after a coaching change. After the club was relegated from the 2. Bundesliga, Stojković left as a free agent in 2017.

=== Red Star Belgrade ===
On 12 June 2017, Stojković rejoined his home club Red Star Belgrade on a two-year deal. On 18 December 2018, Stojković signed a contract extension with Red Star to the summer of 2022.

=== Rapid Wien ===
On 30 August 2019, Stojković signed for Rapid Wien for an undisclosed fee believed to be in the region of €300,000. He signed a contract until 2022. However, he was sacked by the club officials after he reported an injury so he can go and watch the Serbian Cup final between his beloved Red Star and Partizan.

=== LASK ===
Stojković signed for LASK in summer 2022.

== International career ==
Stojković represented Serbia at the 2012 UEFA European Under-19 Championship. He was also a member of the Serbia U21s at the 2015 UEFA European Under-21 Championship.

In May 2016, Stojković was called up to the Montenegro national team by coach Ljubiša Tumbaković. Despite being called up in June 2019, Stojković (along with Mirko Ivanić and Serbian manager Tumbaković) refused to play for the national team against Kosovo. Tumbaković was sacked for his actions the next day. Stojković has earned a total of 15 caps, scoring no goals. His final international was a March 2019 European Championship qualification match against England.

== Career statistics ==
=== Club ===
As of match played 12 December 2024

Appearances and goals by club, season and competition
Club	Season	League			Cup		Continental		Other		Total	
Club	Season	Division	Apps	Goals	Apps	Goals	Apps	Goals	Apps	Goals	Apps	Goals
Sopot (loan)	2009–10	Serbian League Belgrade	22	0	—		—		—		22	0
Sopot (loan)	2010–11	Serbian League Belgrade	22	0	—		—		—		22	0
Sopot (loan)	Total		44	0	—		—		—		44	0
Red Star Belgrade	2011–12	Serbian SuperLiga	1	0	3	0	0	0	—		4	0
Banat Zrenjanin (loan)	2012–13	Serbian First League	11	0	0	0	—		—		11	0
Čukarički (loan)	2012–13	Serbian First League	14	1	—		—		—		14	1
Čukarički	2013–14	Serbian SuperLiga	28	1	1	0	—		—		29	1
Čukarički	2014–15	Serbian SuperLiga	27	0	6	0	3 (Note: Appearance(s) in UEFA Europa League)	0	—		36	0
Čukarički	2015–16	Serbian SuperLiga	34	0	1	0	4	0	—		39	0
Čukarički	2016–17	Serbian SuperLiga	0	0	—		1	0	—		1	0
Čukarički	Total		103	2	8	0	8	0	—		119	2
1860 Munich	2016–17	2. Bundesliga	8	0	2	0	—		—		10	0
Red Star Belgrade	2017–18	Serbian SuperLiga	30	1	3	0	16	0	—		49	1
Red Star Belgrade	2018–19	Serbian SuperLiga	23	1	3	0	13 (Note: Appearance(s) in UEFA Champions League)	0	—		39	1
Red Star Belgrade	2019–20	Serbian SuperLiga	1	0	0	0	3	0	—		4	0
Red Star Belgrade	Total		54	2	6	0	32	0	—		92	2
Rapid Wien	2019–20	Austrian Bundesliga	19	0	1	0	0	0	—		20	0
Rapid Wien	2020–21	Austrian Bundesliga	29	0	2	0	7 (Note: Five appearances in UEFA Europa League and two appearances in UEFA Champions League)	0	—		38	0
Rapid Wien	2021–22	Austrian Bundesliga	25	2	2	0	10 (Note: Seven appearances in UEFA Europa League, two appearances in UEFA Champions League and one appearance in UEFA Europa Conference League)	0	—		35	2
Rapid Wien	Total		73	2	3	0	17	0	—		93	2
LASK	2022–23	Austrian Bundesliga	28	1	5	1	—		—		33	2
LASK	2023–24	Austrian Bundesliga	25	1	4	0	4	0	—		33	1
LASK	2024–25	Austrian Bundesliga	13	0	2	0	7 (Note: Two appearances in UEFA Europa League, five appearances in UEFA Europa Conference League)	0	—		22	0
LASK	Total		66	2	11	1	11	0	—		88	3
Career total			360	8	33	1	68	0	—		458	9

=== International ===
As of 25 March 2019

Appearances and goals by national team and year
National team	Year	Apps	Goals
Montenegro	2016	2	0
Montenegro	2017	4	0
Montenegro	2018	7	0
Montenegro	2019	2	0
Total		15	0

== Honours ==
Red Star Belgrade

- Serbian SuperLiga: 2017–18, 2018–19
- Serbian Cup: 2011–12

Čukarički

- Serbian Cup: 2014–15

Individual

- Serbian SuperLiga Team of the Season: 2014–15, 2015–16, 2017–18, 2018–19
