= 2022–23 LASK season =

LASK
2022–23 season
- Owner: LASK GmbH
- Chairman: Siegmund Gruber
- Head coach: Dietmar Kühbauer
- Stadium: Waldstadion
- Austrian Bundesliga: 3rd
- Austrian Cup: Semi-finals
- Top goalscorer: League: Keito Nakamura (14); All: Keito Nakamura (17)
Home colours	Away colours

The 2022–23 season was the 115th in the history of LASK and their sixth consecutive season in the top flight. The club participated in the Austrian Bundesliga and the Austrian Cup.

== Players ==
As of 18 January 2023

Note: Flags indicate national team as defined under FIFA eligibility rules; some limited exceptions apply. Players may hold more than one non-FIFA nationality.

No.	Pos.	Nation	Player
1	GK	AUT	Alexander Schlager
3	DF	HUN	Ákos Kecskés
4	DF	FRA	Yannis Letard
5	DF	GER	Philipp Ziereis
6	DF	AUT	Philipp Wiesinger
7	MF	AUT	Rene Renner
8	MF	AUT	Peter Michorl
10	MF	AUT	Robert Žulj
11	FW	CRO	Marin Ljubičić
14	FW	AUT	Husein Balić
15	FW	AUT	Tobias Anselm
17	FW	NGR	Moses Usor (on loan from Slavia Prague)
18	MF	SRB	Branko Jovičić

No.	Pos.	Nation	Player
19	MF	AUT	Marvin Potzmann
20	FW	GRE	Efthymis Koulouris
22	DF	MNE	Filip Stojković
24	GK	AUT	Tobias Lawal
27	FW	AUT	Thomas Goiginger
29	MF	AUT	Florian Flecker
30	MF	AUT	Sascha Horvath
33	DF	AUT	Felix Luckeneder
34	DF	GER	Jan Boller
36	GK	GER	Thomas Gebauer
38	FW	JPN	Keito Nakamura
43	MF	AUT	Nemanja Celic (on loan from Darmstadt 98)
45	MF	COL	Fredy Valencia

=== Out on loan ===
Note: Flags indicate national team as defined under FIFA eligibility rules; some limited exceptions apply. Players may hold more than one non-FIFA nationality.

No.	Pos.	Nation	Player
—	GK	AUT	Nikolas Polster (at Vorwärts Steyr until 30 June 2023)
—	DF	AUT	Sebastian Kapsamer (at SKU Amstetten until 30 June 2023)
—	DF	CIV	Oumar Sako (at Arda Kardzhali until 30 June 2023)
—	DF	CZE	Filip Twardzik (at Spartak Trnava until 30 June 2023)

No.	Pos.	Nation	Player
—	MF	AUT	Marco Sulzner (at First Vienna until 30 June 2023)
—	MF	SRB	Jovan Lukić (at Torreense until 30 June 2023)
—	FW	AUT	Thomas Sabitzer (at WSG Tirol until 30 June 2023)
—	FW	AUT	Dominik Weixelbraun (at SKU Amstetten until 30 June 2023)

== Pre-season and friendlies ==
Win Draw Loss Fixtures

2 July 2022 Friendly	LASK	2–0	Rapid București	Ulmerfeld
17:00 CEST (UTC+2)				Stadium: Peter Lisec Stadion

6 July 2022 Friendly	1860 Munich	1–1	LASK	Windischgarsten
18:30 CEST (UTC+2)				Stadium: Sportplatz Windischgarsten

9 July 2022 Friendly	LASK	0–0	Eintracht Frankfurt	Pernegg an der Mur
15:00 CEST (UTC+2)				Stadium: Raiffeisen-Stadion SC 1960 Pernegg

23 September 2022 Friendly	LASK	9–2	SKU Amstetten	Linz
14:00 CEST (UTC+2)				Stadium: Hofmann-Personal Stadion

2 December 2022 Friendly	LASK	2–1	Admira	Pasching
14:00 CEST (UTC+2)		Report		Stadium: Raiffeisen Arena

10 December 2022 Friendly	St. Pölten	0–1	LASK	Sankt Pölten
14:00 CEST (UTC+2)		Report		Stadium: NV Arena

17 December 2022 Friendly	LASK	0–0	Bayreuth	Pasching
14:00 CEST (UTC+2)		Report		Stadium: Raiffeisen Arena

14 January 2023 Friendly	LASK	5–1	Vorwärts Steyr	Pasching
14:00 CEST (UTC+2)		Report		Stadium: Raiffeisen Arena

17 January 2023 Friendly	LASK	4–3	Kapfenberger SV	Pasching
14:00 CEST (UTC+2)		Report		Stadium: Raiffeisen Arena

21 January 2023 Friendly	Sanfrecce Hiroshima	1–2	LASK	Belek
13:00 CEST (UTC+2)		Report		Stadium: Hotel RIU Kaya - Field B

24 January 2023 Friendly	CSKA Sofia	1–3	LASK	Kumköy
13:00 CEST (UTC+2)		Report		Stadium: TSS Football Center

27 January 2023 Friendly	LASK	1–1	Nieciecza
10:00 CEST (UTC+2)		Report

27 January 2023 Friendly	Wisła Kraków	1–3	LASK
14:00 CEST (UTC+2)		Report

== Competitions ==
=== Overall record ===
Competition	First match	Last match	Starting round	Final position	Record							
Competition	First match	Last match	Starting round	Final position	Pld	W	D	L	GF	GA	GD	Win %
Austrian Bundesliga	23 July 2022	3 June 2023	Matchday 1	3rd	32	14	12	6	54	38	+16	43.75
Austrian Cup	16 July 2022	6 April 2023	First round	Semi-finals	5	4	0	1	16	4	+12	80.00
Total					37	18	12	7	70	42	+28	48.65

Source: Soccerway

=== Austrian Bundesliga ===
==== League table ====
Pos	Team	Pld	W	D	L	GF	GA	GD	Pts	Qualification
1	Red Bull Salzburg	22	17	4	1	49	13	+36	55	Qualification for the Championship round
2	Sturm Graz	22	14	6	2	37	15	+22	48	Qualification for the Championship round
3	LASK	22	10	8	4	38	28	+10	38	Qualification for the Championship round
4	Rapid Wien	22	10	3	9	34	26	+8	33	Qualification for the Championship round
5	Austria Wien	22	10	5	7	37	31	+6	32 (Note: Austria Wien were deducted 3 points due to license violation.)	Qualification for the Championship round

Source: Austrian Football Bundesliga
Rules for classification: 1) Points; 2) Head-to-head record; 3) Goal difference; 4) Goals scored; 5) Matches won; 6) Away matches won; 7) Away goals scored.
Notes:

Pos	Team	Pld	W	D	L	GF	GA	GD	Pts	Qualification	RBS	STU	LIN	RWI	AWI	KLA
1	Red Bull Salzburg (C)	32	23	8	1	67	22	+45	49	Qualification for the Champions League group stage	—	2–1	0–0	2–1	3–3	3–2
2	Sturm Graz	32	20	6	6	57	29	+28	42	Qualification for the Champions League third qualifying round	0–2	—	2–0	3–1	3–2	4–1
3	LASK	32	14	12	6	54	38	+16	35	Qualification for the Europa League play-off round	0–1	2–1	—	3–1	3–1	4–0
4	Rapid Wien	32	12	6	14	50	47	+3	25	Qualification for the Europa Conference League third qualifying round	1–1	3–2	1–1	—	3–3	3–1
5	Austria Wien (O)	32	11	10	11	55	52	+3	24	Qualification for the Europa Conference League play-offs	1–1	1–2	2–2	3–1	—	1–2

Source: Austrian Football Bundesliga
Legend: Blue = home team win; Yellow = draw; Red = away team win.
Rules for classification: 1) Points; 2) Points with (possible) half points subtracted due to rounding; 3) Head-to-head points; 4) Head-to-head goal difference; 5) Head-to-head goals scored; 6) Head-to-head away goals scored; 7) Goal difference; 8) Goals scored; 9) Matches won; 10) Away matches won; 11) Away goals scored.
(C) Champions; (O) Play-off winners

Pos	Team	Pld	W	D	L	GF	GA	GD	Pts	Qualification	WOL	LUS	WAT	HAR	ALT	RIE
1	Wolfsberger AC	32	12	6	14	51	51	0	31	Qualification for the Europa Conference League play-offs	—	2–2	2–0	2–2	0–0	1–0
2	Austria Lustenau	32	11	10	11	50	54	−4	29	Qualification for the Europa Conference League play-offs	1–3	—	2–4	5–1	1–0	2–2
3	WSG Tirol	32	10	8	14	44	53	−9	24		4–0	0–2	—	1–1	1–1	1–1
4	Hartberg	32	9	6	17	39	56	−17	24		0–2	0–1	5–0	—	2–2	2–0
5	Rheindorf Altach	32	6	10	16	29	53	−24	19		0–2	1–1	1–0	0–1	—	1–1
6	Ried (R)	32	4	11	17	27	50	−23	14	Relegation to Austrian Football Second League	1–2	4–4	1–1	1–3	0–1	—

Legend: Blue = home team win; Yellow = draw; Red = away team win.
Rules for classification: 1) Points; 2) Points with (possible) half points subtracted due to rounding; 3) Head-to-head points; 4) Head-to-head goal difference; 5) Head-to-head goals scored; 6) Head-to-head away goals scored; 7) Goal difference; 8) Goals scored; 9) Matches won; 10) Away matches won; 11) Away goals scored.
(R) Relegated

==== Results summary ====
Overall								Home						Away					
Pld	W	D	L	GF	GA	GD	Pts	W	D	L	GF	GA	GD	W	D	L	GF	GA	GD
22	10	8	4	38	28	+10	38	5	3	3	19	17	+2	5	5	1	19	11	+8

Last updated: 19 March 2023.
Source: Austrian Football Bundesliga

==== Results by round ====
Round	1	2	3	4	5	6	7	8	9	10	11	12	13	14	15	16	17	18	19	20	21	22
Ground	H	A	A	H	A	H	H	A	H	A	H	A	H	H	A	H	A	A	H	A	H	A
Result	W	D	W	W	W	W	D	D	L	D	L	W	D	W	L	D	W	D	W	W	L	D
Position	2	2	1	1	1	1	2	2	3	3	3	3	3	3	3	3	3	3	3	3	3	3

Updated to match(es) played on 19 March 2023. Source: Austrian Football Bundesliga
A = Away; H = Home; W = Win; D = Draw; L = Loss

==== Matches ====
The league fixtures were announced on 22 June 2022.

23 July 2022 1	LASK	3–1	Austria Klagenfurt	Linz
17:00 CEST (UTC+2)	Nakamura 14'; Goiginger 29'; Ljubičić 49'	Report	Pink 89'	Stadium: Raiffeisen Arena; Attendance: 4,064; Referee: Harald Lechner

31 July 2022 2	Austria Wien	1–1	LASK	Vienna
17:00 CEST (UTC+2)	Gruber 88'	Report	Ljubičić 67'	Stadium: Franz Horr Stadium; Referee: Christian-Petru Ciochirca

6 August 2022 3	Wolfsberger AC	1–5	LASK	Wolfsberg
17:00 CEST (UTC+2)	Novak 61'	Report	Ljubičić 1', 21', 37', 58'; Goiginger 8'	Stadium: Lavanttal-Arena; Referee: Rene Eisner

14 August 2022 4	LASK	2–1	Rapid Wien	Linz
17:00 CEST (UTC+2)	Goiginger 10'; Jovičić (yellow card) 18'; Nakamura 43'; Žulj (yellow card) 83'	Report	Grüll (yellow card) 41' (goal) 90+3'; Oswald (yellow card) 60'	Stadium: Raiffeisen Arena; Attendance: 5,502; Referee: (Austria) Sebastian Gishamer

20 August 2022 5	Sturm Graz	0–1	LASK	Graz
19:30 CEST (UTC+2)	Wüthrich (yellow card) 81'; Schnegg (yellow card) 86'; Gazibegović (yellow card) 90+1'	Report	Nakamura 65'; Schlager (yellow card) 87'; Jovičić (yellow card) 88'	Stadium: Merkur-Arena; Attendance: 12,704; Referee: (Austria) Walter Altmann

27 August 2022 6	LASK	4–1	Rheindorf Altach	Linz
19:30 CEST (UTC+2)	Jovičić (yellow card) 26' (goal) 64'; Žulj 31'; Horvath 80'; Koulouris 85'	Report	Schreiner (yellow card) 6'; Jurčec 61'; Edokpolor (yellow card) 74'; Amankwah (yellow card) 77'	Stadium: Raiffeisen Arena; Attendance: 5,130; Referee: (Austria) Harald Lechner

4 September 2022 7	LASK	1–1	Ried	Linz
17:00 CEST (UTC+2)	Ljubičić (red card) 10'; Nakamura 45+2'; Michorl (yellow card) 90+5'	Report	Michael Martin (yellow card) 58'; David Ungar (red card) 65'; Mikić (yellow card) 73'; Pomer 77'; Ziegl (yellow card) 81'; Kronberger (yellow card) 87'	Stadium: Raiffeisen Arena; Attendance: 5,575; Referee: (Austria) Alexander Harkam

11 September 2022 8	Austria Lustenau	1–1	LASK	Lustenau
14:30 CEST (UTC+2)	Hugonet (yellow card) 31'; Fridrikas 82'	Report	Nakamura 23'; Stojković (yellow card) 30' (yellow-red card) 83'; Goiginger (yellow card) 65'; Jovičić (yellow card) 86'	Stadium: Planet Pure Stadion; Attendance: 4,277; Referee: (Austria) Andreas Heiß

17 September 2022 9	LASK	1–4	WSG Tirol	Linz
17:00 CEST (UTC+2)	Nakamura 3'; Celic (yellow card) 19'	Report	Prelec 5' 41' 63'; Rinaldi 45+1'; Sulzbacher (yellow card) 58'	Stadium: Raiffeisen Arena; Attendance: 4,316; Referee: (Austria) Chiristian-Petru Ciochirca

1 October 2022 10	Red Bull Salzburg	1–1	LASK	Salzburg
17:00 CEST (UTC+2)	Dedić (yellow card) 30'; Solet 90+6'	Report	Ljubičić 78'	Stadium: Red Bull Arena; Attendance: 14,780; Referee: (Austria) Harald Lechner

8 October 2022 11	LASK	0–3	Hartberg	Linz
17:00 CEST (UTC+2)	Jovičić (yellow card) 84'	Report	Providence (yellow card) 40'; Kriwak 55'; Tadić 62'; Horvat 78'	Stadium: Raiffeisen Arena; Attendance: 4,499; Referee: (Austria) Gerhard Grobelnik

15 October 2022 12	Austria Klagenfurt	1–3	LASK	Klagenfurt
17:00 CEST (UTC+2)	Arweiler 63'; Irving (yellow card) 64'; Benatelli (yellow card) 80'; Wimmer (yellow card) 81'	Report	Ljubičić 15' (yellow card) 45+3' (goal) 72'; Kecskés (yellow card) 76'; Nakamura 78'	Stadium: 28 Black Arena; Attendance: 3,388; Referee: (Austria) Julian Weinberger

23 October 2022 13	LASK	2–2	Austria Wien	Linz
17:00 CEST (UTC+2)	Stojković (yellow card) 2'; Žulj 55' (pen.); Renner (yellow card) 65'; Jovičić (yellow card) 72'; Horvath 87'	Report	Ranftl (yellow card) 8'; Lucas Galvão (yellow card) 53'; Polster 61' (yellow card) 79'; Teigl (yellow card) 71'; Marvin da Graça 83'	Stadium: Raiffeisen Arena; Attendance: 5,499; Referee: (Austria) Sebastian Gishamer

30 October 2022 14	LASK	4–1	Wolfsberger AC	Linz
14:30 CEST (UTC+2)	Žulj 11' 16' 22'; Nakamura 59'	Report	Malone 85'	Stadium: Raiffeisen Arena; Attendance: 4,729; Referee: (Austria) Alexander Harkam

6 November 2022 15	Rapid Wien	1–0	LASK	Vienna
17:00 CEST (UTC+2)	Burgstaller 40'; Grüll (yellow card) 90+1'	Report	Michorl (yellow card) 33'	Stadium: Allianz Stadion; Attendance: 17,873; Referee: (Austria) Alan Kijas

13 November 2022 16	LASK	1–1	Sturm Graz	Pasching
17:00 CET (UTC+1)	Goiginger (yellow card) 26'; Renner 46'; Horvath (yellow card) 68'	Report	Emegha 76'	Stadium: Raiffeisen Arena; Attendance: 5,800; Referee: (Austria) Sebastian Gishamer

12 February 2023 17	Rheindorf Altach	0–1	LASK	Altach
14:30 CET (UTC+1)	Gugganig (yellow card) 90+6'	Report	Nakamura 10'; Jovičić (yellow card) 34' (yellow-red card) 47'	Stadium: CASHPOINT Arena; Attendance: 4,258; Referee: (Austria) Christopher Jäeger

18 February 2023 18	Ried	1–1	LASK	Ried im Innkreis
17:00 CET (UTC+1)	Lang 45+1' (pen.); Roko Jurišić (yellow card) 45+4'; David Ungar (yellow card) 53'; Denizcan Cosgun (yellow card) 74'; Pomer (yellow card) 89'	Report	Luckeneder (red card) 45'; Schlager (yellow card) 45+4'; Stojković (yellow card) 45+4'; Goiginger (yellow card) 45+4'; Ziereis (yellow card) 69'; Nakamura 90'	Stadium: Josko Arena; Attendance: 6,400; Referee: (Austria) Julian Weinberger

24 February 2023 19	LASK	1–0	Austria Lustenau	Pasching
20:30 CET (UTC+1)	Stojković (yellow card) 84'; Ljubičić 90+4' (pen.)	Report	Koudossou (yellow card) 77'; Maak (yellow card) 89'; Fridrikas (yellow card) 90+4'	Stadium: Raiffeisen Arena; Attendance: 12,000; Referee: (Austria) Harald Lechner

=== Austrian Cup ===
16 July 2022 First round	SC Schwaz	1–9	LASK	Schwaz
18:00 CEST (UTC+2)	Auer 1'; Knoflach (yellow card) 45'; Leitner (yellow card) 64'	Report	Nakamura 18'; Stojković 24'; Luckeneder (yellow card) 31'; Ljubičić 44', 54', 56'; Goiginger 65', 77'; Jovičić 79'; Schmidt 90'	Stadium: Silberstadt Arena Schwaz; Attendance: 600; Referee: Sebastian Gishamer

31 August 2022 Second round	Imst	1–4 (a.e.t.)	LASK	Imst
18:00 CEST (UTC+2)	Bernhard Mittermair (yellow card) 35'; Louis Zimmerschied (yellow card) 58'; Lukas Lamp (yellow card) 69'; Armin Hamzic 72'; Sandro Waibl (yellow card) 81'; Marko Jovljevic (yellow card) 90+3'	Report	Celic (yellow card) 38'; Ziereis (red card) 62'; Nakamura 86' 104'; Flecker 94'; Ljubičić 118'	Stadium: Velly Arena; Attendance: 2,500; Referee: (Austria) Emil Ristoskov

18 October 2022 Third round	Floridsdorfer AC	1–2	LASK	Floridsdorf
20:15 CEST (UTC+2)	Monsberger 39'; Bubalović (yellow card) 59'; Masse Scherzadeh (yellow card) 90+1'	Report	Renner 23'; Goiginger 89' (yellow card) 90+1'	Stadium: FAC-Platz; Attendance: 2,074; Referee: (Austria) Markus Hameter

5 February 2023 Quarter-finals	LASK	1–0	Austria Klagenfurt	Pasching
18:00 CET (UTC+1)	Žulj 50'; Usor (yellow card) 88'	Report	Wimmer (red card) 59'	Stadium: Raiffeisen Arena; Attendance: 4,200; Referee: (Austria) Chiristian-Petru Ciochirca

6 April 2023 Semi-finals	Sturm Graz	1–0	LASK	Graz
20:30 CET (UTC+1)				Stadium: Merkur-Arena
