= Moses Usor =

Nigerian footballer (born 2002)

Personal information
- Date of birth: 5 February 2002 (age 24)
- Place of birth: Nigeria
- Height: 1.81 m (5 ft 11 in)
- Position: Winger

Team information
- Current team: LASK
- Number: 8

Youth career
- 2008–2022: 36 Lions FC

Senior career*
| Years | Team | Apps | (Gls) |
| 2022 | Slavia Prague B | 9 | (6) |
| 2022–2023 | Slavia Prague | 16 | (4) |
| 2023 | → LASK (loan) | 29 | (3) |
| 2024– | LASK | 63 | (16) |

International career^{‡}
| 2026– | Nigeria | 4 | (1) |
- * Club domestic league appearances and goals as of 21:31, 31 October 2026 (UTC) ‡ National team caps and goals as of 22:08, 17 November 2026 (UTC)

Moses Usor (born 5 February 2002) is a Nigerian professional footballer who plays as a winger for Austrian Football Bundesliga club LASK and the Nigeria national team.

== Club career ==
A youth product of 36 Lions FC, Usor moved to the Slavia Prague B in 2022 and scored six goals in nine games. He was promoted to the senior side, and made his professional and Czech First League debut with Slavia Prague as a late substitute in a 2–1 loss to Sparta Prague on 15 May 2022. On 23 June 2022, he signed a professional contract with the club for three years.

Usor joined Austrian Football Bundesliga club LASK on a season-long loan deal on 18 January 2023. On 17 November 2023, LASK made the transfer permanent with Usor signing a contract until June 2028.

== International Career ==
On 25 September 2026, Usor made his first appearance for the Super Eagles against Madagascar in Nigeria's opening Group L fixture of the 2027 Africa Cup of Nations qualifiers. He scored on his debut, recording his first goal for Nigeria on the same day as his first senior international appearance.

== Playing style ==
A left-footed winger, Usor typically operates on the right flank, where he can cut inside onto his stronger foot to shoot. He combines a low centre of gravity with pace and dynamism, supported by strong technical ability.

== Career statistics ==
=== Club ===
As of match played 3 November 2026

Appearances and goals by club, season and competition
| Club | Season | League | | | National cup (Note: Includes Czech Cup, Austrian Cup) | | Continental | | Total | |
| Club | Season | Division | Apps | Goals | Apps | Goals | Apps | Goals | Apps | Goals |
|---|---|---|---|---|---|---|---|---|---|---|
| Slavia Prague | 2021–22 | Czech First League | 1 | 0 | — | | — | | 1 | 0 |
| Slavia Prague | 2022–23 | Czech First League | 15 | 4 | 1 | 0 | 11 (Note: Appearances in UEFA Europa Conference League) | 2 | 27 | 6 |
| Slavia Prague | Total | | 16 | 4 | 1 | 0 | 11 | 2 | 28 | 6 |
| LASK (loan) | 2022–23 | Austrian Bundesliga | 16 | 1 | 2 | 0 | — | | 18 | 1 |
| LASK (loan) | 2023–24 | Austrian Bundesliga | 13 | 2 | 2 | 0 | 7 (Note: Appearances in UEFA Europa League) | 1 | 22 | 3 |
| LASK (loan) | Total | | 29 | 3 | 4 | 0 | 7 | 1 | 40 | 4 |
| LASK | 2023–24 | Austrian Bundesliga | 15 | 1 | — | | — | | 15 | 1 |
| LASK | 2024–25 | Austrian Bundesliga | 8 | 0 | 2 | 1 | 1 | 0 | 11 | 1 |
| LASK | 2025–26 | Austrian Bundesliga | 30 | 13 | 5 | 2 | — | | 35 | 15 |
| LASK | 2026–27 | Austrian Bundesliga | 10 | 2 | 3 | 1 | 5 (Note: Appearances in UEFA Champions League) | 1 | 18 | 4 |
| LASK | Total | | 63 | 16 | 10 | 4 | 6 | 1 | 79 | 21 |
| Career total | | | 88 | 23 | 15 | 4 | 24 | 4 | 127 | 31 |

=== International ===
As of match played 17 November 2026

Appearances and goals by national team and year
| National team | Year | Apps | Goals |
|---|---|---|---|
| Nigeria | 2026 | 4 | 1 |
| Total | | 4 | 1 |

=== International goals ===
Scores and results list Nigeria's goal tally first, score column indicates score after each Usor goal.

List of international goals scored by Moses Usor
| No. | Date | Venue | Opponent | Score | Result | Competition |
|---|---|---|---|---|---|---|
| 1. | 25 September 2026 | Godswill Akpabio International Stadium, Uyo, Nigeria | Madagascar | 2–1 | 2–1 | 2027 Africa Cup of Nations qualification |

== Honours ==
LASK

- Austrian Bundesliga: 2025–26
- Austrian Cup: 2025–26
