= Vadym Taloverov =

Ukrainian retired footballer

Personal information
- Full name: Vadim Nikolaevich Taloverov (Вадим Миколайович Таловєров)
- Date of birth: 2 December 1971 (age 54)
- Place of birth: Kuybyshev, USSR
- Height: 1.87 m (6 ft 2 in)
- Position: Centre-back

Youth career
- School nr.9 Kuibyshev
- Krylia Sovetov Kuybyshev Academy

Senior career*
Years	Team	Apps	(Gls)
1989	ShVSM-SKA	5	(0)
1989	→ Krylia Sovetov Kuybyshev (loan)	1	(0)
1990	MCOP-Metallurg		
1991	Uralmash Yekaterinburg	0	(0)
1992—1994	Shakhtar Donetsk	0	(0)
1992—1994	→ Metalurh Kostiantynivka (loan)	49	(0)
1994—1995	Uralan Elista	22	(2)
1995	→ Uralan-d Elista (loan)	8	(0)
1997—1998	Cherkasy	12	(0)
1999	Metalurh Donetsk	2	(0)
1999	Mashynobudivnyk Druzhkivka	7	(0)
2000	Spartak Nalchik	8	(0)
2001	Monolit Kostiantynivka		
2002	FK Atyrau	1	(0)
2003	Shakhtar Torez		
2004	Agro Chișinău	3	(0)
2006	FK Ilyich-Osipenko		
Total		118	(2)
- * Club domestic league appearances and goals as of 1 March 2025 ‡ National team caps and goals as of 1 March 2025

Vadim Nikolaevich Taloverov (Ukrainian: Вадим Миколайович Таловєров), is a Ukrainian retired professional footballer.

== Career ==
He started playing football in Kuibyshev Youth Sports School-9 under coach Sergei Uspensky. In 1989, he made his debut in the second league as part of ShVSM-SKA. In the middle of the season, a group of ShVSM-SKA players (Niyaz Ildusovich Akbarov, Gribov, Vyacheslav Valeriyovych Nedorostkov, Fedotov) moved to Krylia Sovetov Kuybyshev.

After the collapse of the USSR, he played in Russia, Ukraine, Kazakhstan, and Moldova.

== Personal life ==
He is the father of professional international footballer Maksym Talovierov. After retiring he has settled with his wife in Kyiv, including during the Russian invasion of Ukraine.
