= Felix Luckeneder =

Austrian footballer

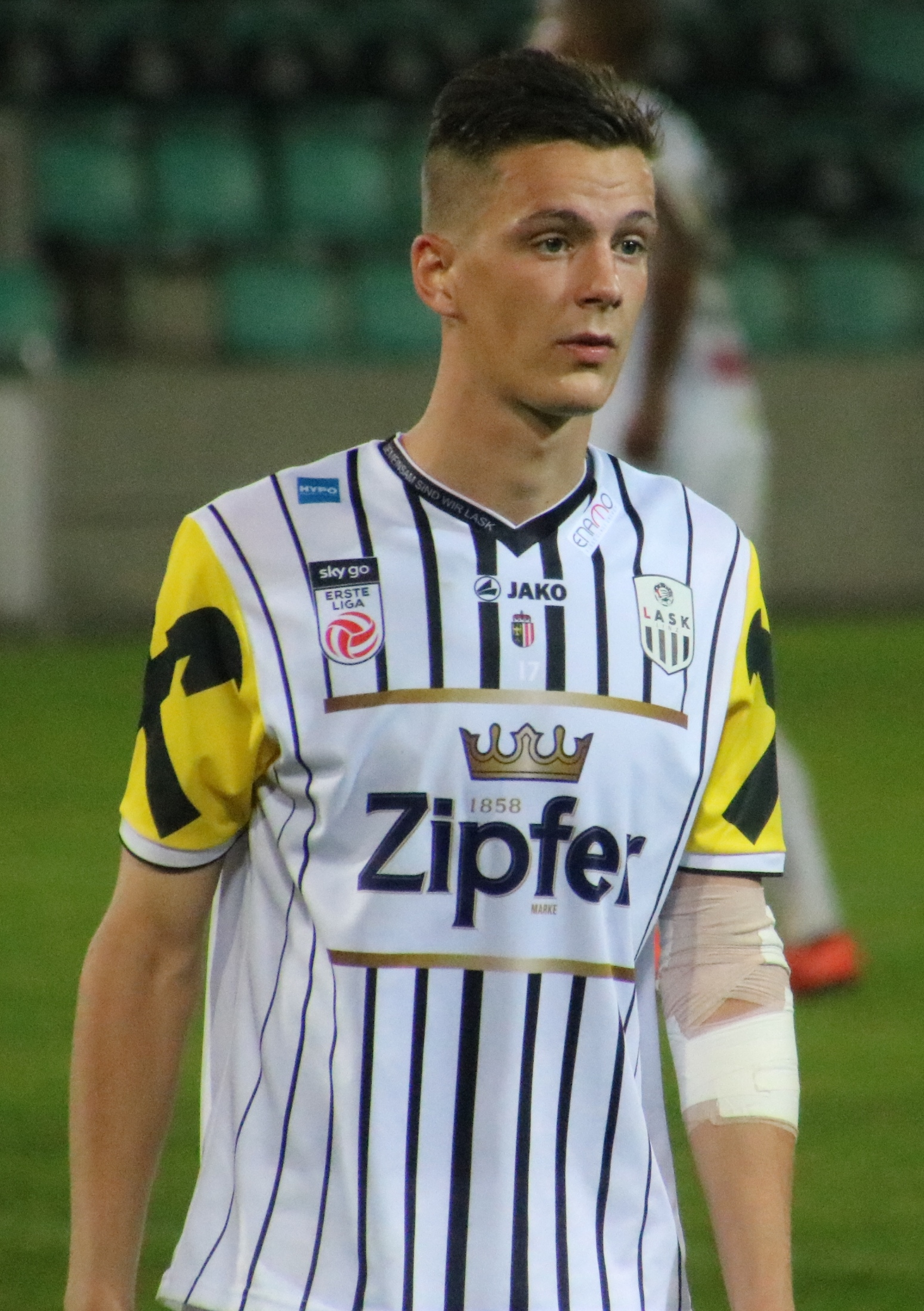

Personal information
- Date of birth: 21 March 1994 (age 32)
- Place of birth: Linz, Austria
- Height: 1.90 m (6 ft 3 in)
- Position: Centre back

Team information
- Current team: First Vienna
- Number: 32

Youth career
- –2012: Fußballakademie Linz

Senior career*
Years	Team	Apps	(Gls)
2012–2020	LASK	79	(9)
2014–2020	Juniors OÖ	29	(2)
2018–2019	→ Rheindorf Altach (loan)	16	(1)
2019–2020	→ TSV Hartberg (loan)	31	(2)
2020–2021	TSV Hartberg	37	(1)
2021–2024	LASK	58	(3)
2024–2026	SV Wehen Wiesbaden	34	(0)
2026–	First Vienna	0	(0)
- * Club domestic league appearances and goals as of 16 May 2026

Felix Luckeneder (born 21 March 1994) is an Austrian footballer who plays for First Vienna.

== Club career ==
On 31 August 2021, he returned to LASK on a three-year contract.

On 25 July 2024, Luckeneder signed with SV Wehen Wiesbaden in German 3. Liga.

== Career statistics ==
=== Club ===
As of match played 19 May 2024

Appearances and goals by club, season and competition
Club	Season	League			National Cup (Note: Includes Austrian Cup)		Europe		Other		Total	
Club	Season	Division	Apps	Goals	Apps	Goals	Apps	Goals	Apps	Goals	Apps	Goals
LASK	2012–13	Austrian Regionalliga	2	0	1	0	—		—		3	0
LASK	2013–14	Austrian Regionalliga	6	0	0	0	—		—		6	0
LASK	2014–15	2. Liga	3	0	0	0	—		—		3	0
LASK	2015–16	2. Liga	25	1	3	1	—		—		28	2
LASK	2016–17	2. Liga	26	6	4	0	—		—		30	6
LASK	2017–18	Austrian Bundesliga	17	2	2	0	—		—		19	2
LASK	Total		79	9	10	1	—		—		89	10
FC Juniors OÖ	2014–15	Austrian Regionalliga	23	2	—		—		—		23	2
FC Juniors OÖ	2015–16	Austrian Regionalliga	3	0	—		—		—		3	0
FC Juniors OÖ	2017–18	Austrian Regionalliga	3	0	—		—		—		3	0
FC Juniors OÖ	Total		29	2	—		—		—		29	2
Rheindorf Altach II	2018–19	Austrian Regionalliga	1	0	—		—		—		1	0
Rheindorf Altach (loan)	2018–19	Austrian Bundesliga	16	1	2	0	—		—		18	1
Hartberg	2019–20	Austrian Bundesliga	29	2	1	0	—		2 (Note: Appearance(s) in play-off)	0	32	2
Hartberg	2020–21	Austrian Bundesliga	31	1	3	2	1 (Note: Appearance(s) in UEFA Europa League)	0	1	0	36	3
Hartberg	2021–22	Austrian Bundesliga	5	0	1	0	—		—		6	0
Hartberg	Total		65	3	5	2	1	0	3	0	74	5
LASK	2021–22	Austrian Bundesliga	13	1	2	0	5 (Note: Appearance(s) in UEFA Conference League)	0	0	0	20	1
LASK	2022–23	Austrian Bundesliga	30	0	4	0	—		—		34	0
LASK	2023–24	Austrian Bundesliga	15	2	3	1	4 (Note: Appearances in UEFA Europa League)	0	—		22	3
LASK	Total		58	3	9	1	9	0	0	0	76	4
Career total			248	18	26	4	10	0	3	0	287	22
