= Robert Žulj =

Austrian footballer

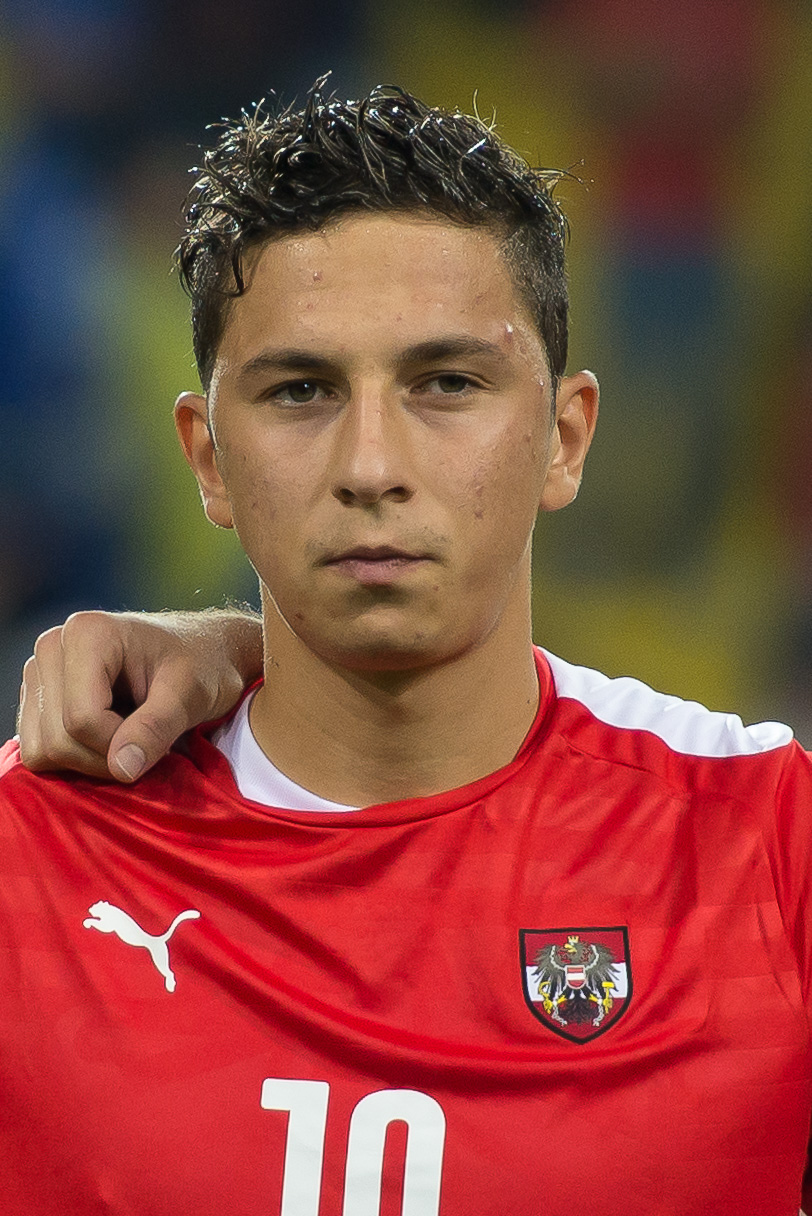
- Žulj with Austria U21 in 2014

Personal information
- Full name: Robert Žulj
- Date of birth: 5 February 1992 (age 34)
- Place of birth: Wels, Austria
- Height: 1.89 m (6 ft 2 in)
- Positions: Attacking midfielder; forward

Team information
- Current team: Ratchaburi
- Number: 32

Youth career
- 1999–2006: FC Wels
- 2006–2010: AKA Linz

Senior career*
Years	Team	Apps	(Gls)
2010–2011	SG SV Neuhofen/SV Ried II	15	(11)
2010–2014	Ried	94	(26)
2014	Red Bull Salzburg	10	(1)
2014–2017	Greuther Fürth	85	(19)
2017–2020	Hoffenheim	5	(0)
2017–2020	→ Hoffenheim II	2	(1)
2018–2019	→ Union Berlin (loan)	29	(4)
2020–2021	Bochum	42	(16)
2021–2022	Ittihad Kalba	22	(4)
2022–2025	LASK	72	(27)
2025–2026	Buriram United	32	(13)
2026–	Ratchaburi	0	(0)

International career^{‡}
2009–2010	Austria U18	5	(1)
2010	Austria U19	4	(2)
2011	Austria U20	3	(0)
2013–2015	Austria U21	6	(2)
2014	Austria	0	(0)
Medal record
Red Bull Salzburg
Winner	Austrian Bundesliga	2013–14
Winner	Austrian Cup	2013–14
VfL Bochum
Winner	2. Bundesliga	2020–21
- * Club domestic league appearances and goals as of 11 September 2026 ‡ National team caps and goals as of 26 October 2023

Robert Žulj (Croatian pronunciation: [ʒuʎ]; born 5 February 1992) is an Austrian professional footballer who plays as a midfielder or forward for Thai League 1 club Ratchaburi.

== Career ==
=== Greuther Fürth ===
In July 2014, Žulj joined Greuther Fürth from Red Bull Salzburg.

Žulj finished the 2016–16 season, scoring 8 goals and contributing 9 assists in 32 league matches. In June 2017, he announced he had decided not to renew his contract at Greuther Fürth. In his time at the club, he made a total of 85 appearances in the 2. Bundesliga, scoring 19 goals and contributing 14 assists.

=== 1899 Hoffenheim ===
Days after announcing his decision to leave Greuther Fürth, Žulj signed a three-year contract with TSG 1899 Hoffenheim.

==== Loan to Union Berlin ====
In August 2018, he joined 1. FC Union Berlin on loan for the 2018–19 season.

=== VfL Bochum ===
On 15 January 2020, VfL Bochum announced the capture of Žulj on a three-year deal.

=== Al Ittihad Kalba ===
In July 2021, Zulj joined UAE Pro League side, Al Ittihad Kalba where he scored five goals in 27 games.

=== LASK ===
After only one year in UAE, Austrian team, LASK brought in Zulj on a free transfer where he is still playing. He has made 45 appearances, scoring 19 goals in the process.

== International career ==
On 15 May 2014 Žulj was called up to the first team squad of the Austrian national team for the first time.

== Personal life ==
Žulj was born in Austria and is of Burgenland Croatian descent. He is the older brother of Peter Žulj, who is also a professional footballer.

== Career statistics ==
As of match played 4 January 2026

Appearances and goals by club, season and competition
Club	Season	League			National cup (Note: Includes Austrian Cup, UAE President's Cup)		League cup (Note: Includes UAE League Cup)		Continental		Other		Total	
Club	Season	Division	Apps	Goals	Apps	Goals	Apps	Goals	Apps	Goals	Apps	Goals	Apps	Goals
SG SV Neuhofen/SV Ried II	2010–11	Landesliga Oberösterreich	11	7	2	0	—		—		—		13	7
SG SV Neuhofen/SV Ried II	2011–12	Landesliga Oberösterreich	4	4	0	0	—		—		—		4	4
SG SV Neuhofen/SV Ried II	Total		15	11	2	0	—		—		—		17	11
Ried	2010–11	Austrian Bundesliga	12	0	4	0	—		—		—		16	0
Ried	2011–12	Austrian Bundesliga	29	6	5	2	—		1 (Note: Appearance(s) in UEFA Europa League)	0	—		35	8
Ried	2012–13	Austrian Bundesliga	34	11	5	1	—		4	1	—		43	13
Ried	2013–14	Austrian Bundesliga	20	9	3	1	—		—		—		23	10
Ried	Total		95	26	17	4	—		5	1	—		117	31
Red Bull Salzburg	2013–14	Austrian Bundesliga	10	1	3	2	—		4	0	—		17	3
Greuther Fürth	2014–15	2. Bundesliga	30	5	2	0	—		—		—		32	5
Greuther Fürth	2015–16	2. Bundesliga	32	8	1	0	—		—		—		33	8
Greuther Fürth	2016–17	2. Bundesliga	23	6	3	1	—		—		—		26	7
Greuther Fürth	Total		85	19	6	1	—		—		—		91	20
Hoffenheim	2017–18	Bundesliga	5	0	0	0	—		1	0	—		6	0
Hoffenheim	2019–20	Bundesliga	0	0	0	0	—		—		—		0	0
Hoffenheim	Total		5	0	0	0	—		1	0	—		6	0
Hoffenheim II	2017–18	Regionalliga Südwest	1	1	—		—		—		—		1	1
Hoffenheim II	2019–20	Regionalliga Südwest	1	0	—		—		—		—		1	0
Hoffenheim II	Total		2	1	—		—		—		—		2	1
Union Berlin (loan)	2018–19	2. Bundesliga	29	4	1	0	—		—		2 (Note: Appearances in 2. Bundesliga promotion play-offs)	0	32	4
Bochum	2019–20	2. Bundesliga	11	1	0	0	—		—		—		11	1
Bochum	2020–21	2. Bundesliga	31	15	3	1	—		—		—		34	16
Bochum	Total		42	16	3	1	—		—		—		45	17
Ittihad Kalba	2021–22	UAE Pro League	22	4	1	0	5	1	—		—		27	5
LASK	2022–23	Austrian Bundesliga	25	11	4	1	—		—		—		29	12
LASK	2023–24	Austrian Bundesliga	20	9	1	0	—		8	3	—		29	12
LASK	2024–25	Austrian Bundesliga	30	9	3	4	—		6 (Note: One appearance in UEFA Europa League, five appearances in UEFA Conference League)	0	—		39	13
LASK	Total		75	29	8	5	—		14	3	—		97	37
Buriram United	2025–26	Thai League 1	16	7	0	0	0	0	6 (Note: Appearances in AFC Champions League Elite)	1	3 (Note: Appearances in ASEAN Club Championship)	0	25	8
Career total			396	118	41	13	5	1	30	5	5	0	477	137

== Honours ==
Red Bull Salzburg

- Austrian Bundesliga: 2013–14
- Austrian Cup: 2013–14

VfL Bochum

- 2. Bundesliga: 2020–21

Buriram United

- Thai League 1: 2025–26
