= Keito Nakamura =

Japanese footballer (born 2000)

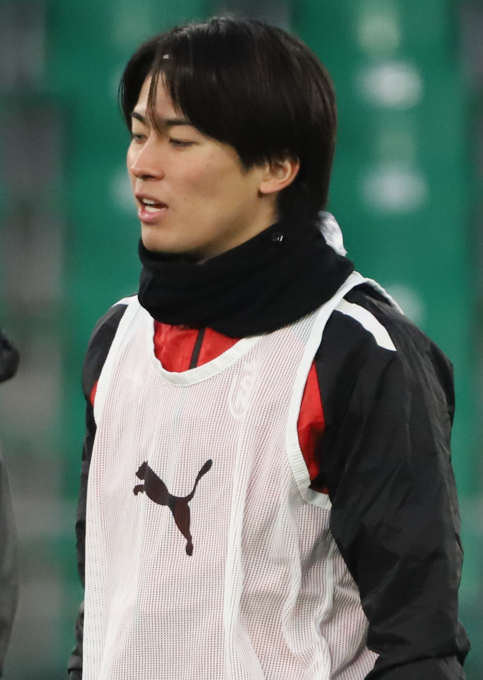
- Nakamura with Reims in 2025

Personal information
- Full name: Keito Nakamura
- Date of birth: 28 July 2000 (age 26)
- Place of birth: Abiko, Chiba, Japan
- Height: 1.81 m (5 ft 11 in)
- Positions: Left winger; forward

Team information
- Current team: Lyon
- Number: 11

Youth career
- Kashiwa Eagles TOR'82
- Kashiwa Reysol
- Konoyama SSS
- 2012–2017: Mitsubishi Yowa

Senior career*
Years	Team	Apps	(Gls)
2018–2021	Gamba Osaka	24	(1)
2018–2019	Gamba Osaka U23	22	(5)
2019–2020	→ Twente (loan)	17	(4)
2020-2021	→ Sint-Truiden (loan)	5	(1)
2021	→ Juniors OÖ (loan)	14	(5)
2021–2023	LASK	54	(20)
2023–2026	Reims	86	(29)
2026–	Lyon	5	(0)

International career^{‡}
2017	Japan U17	12	(8)
2018	Japan U21	2	(0)
2019	Japan U20	4	(0)
2023–	Japan	34	(12)
- * Club domestic league appearances and goals as of 1 November 2026 ‡ National team caps and goals as of 14 November 2026

Keito Nakamura (中村 敬斗, Nakamura Keito; born 28 July 2000) is a Japanese professional footballer who plays as a left winger or forward for Ligue 1 club Lyon and the Japan national team.

== Club career ==
=== Gamba Osaka ===
Nakamura joined Gamba Osaka from Kantō Soccer League side Mitsubishi Yowa ahead of the 2018 J1 League season. He made his senior debut at the age of 17 on 24 February 2018 in a 3–2 home defeat by Nagoya Grampus in which replaced Hwang Ui-jo in the 69th minute and 10 minutes later crossed for Shun Nagasawa to head home and make the score 2–2.

In total he played 17 J1 League games during his debut campaign and netted 1 goal, the winner in a 2–1 win over V-Varen Nagasaki on 24 November. He also scored once in 7 J.League Cup games and made one substitute appearance in the Emperor's Cup, a home defeat to Kwansei Gakuin University.

Nakamura spent a large part of the second half of the season with Gamba's Under-23 side in J3 League where he netted 4 times in 15 appearances with the goals coming against FC Tokyo U-23, Thespakusatsu Gunma and Azul Claro Numazu.

=== FC Juniors 00 ===
In February 2021, Nakamura has loaned to 2. Liga (Austria) club FC Juniors OÖ.

=== LASK ===
On 11 August 2021, he signed a three-year contract with Austrian club LASK.

=== Reims ===
On 10 August 2023, it was announced that he would permanently transfer to Stade de Reims of France's Ligue 1. On 12 August, he made his Ligue 1 debut in the opening game against Olympique de Marseille, coming on as a substitute in the 15th minute of the second half. On 26 September, he scored his first goal in Ligue 1 in Round 6 against Lille OSC.

== International career ==
Nakamura has represented Japan at Under-15, Under-16 and Under-17 level playing in both the AFC Under-16 Championship in 2016, and the 2017 FIFA U-17 World Cup in which he netted 4 times in 4 games before Japan were eliminated by England at the last-16 stage.

In March 2023, he was called up by Hajime Moriyasu for the senior national team for friendlies against Uruguay and Colombia. He made his debut against Uruguay on 24 March 2023, coming off the bench in the 89th minute. The match ended in a 1–1 draw. On 15 June, he came on as a substitute from the start of the second half against El Salvador and scored his first goal for the national team. On 12 September, he made his first start for the national team against Turkey and scored two goals.

In January 2024, he was named for the 2023 AFC Asian Cup final squads alongside Reims teammate, Junya Itō.

On 15 May 2026, Nakamura was selected in the 26-man squad for the 2026 FIFA World Cup. On 14 June, Nakamura scored his first World Cup goal with a right-footed equalizer in the 57th minute, bringing Japan level at 1–1 with the Netherlands in an eventual 2–2 draw in Japan's World Cup opener.

== Style of play ==
Nakamura is a wide player known for his pace, agility, and direct attacking style. Comfortable as a wing-back or winger, he is noted for his dribbling ability, chance creation, and willingness to take on defenders.

== Career statistics ==
=== Club ===
As of match played 1 November 2026

Appearances and goals by club, season and competition
Club	Season	League			National cup (Note: Includes Emperor's Cup, KNVB Cup, Belgian Cup, Austrian Cup, Coupe de France)		League cup (Note: Includes J.League Cup)		Continental		Other		Total	
Club	Season	Division	Apps	Goals	Apps	Goals	Apps	Goals	Apps	Goals	Apps	Goals	Apps	Goals
Gamba Osaka	2018	J1 League	17	1	1	0	7	1	—		—		25	2
Gamba Osaka	2019	J1 League	7	0	1	3	5	3	—		—		13	6
Gamba Osaka	Total		24	1	2	3	12	4	—		—		38	8
Twente (loan)	2019–20	Eredivisie	17	4	1	2	—		—		—		18	6
Sint-Truiden (loan)	2020–21	Belgian Pro League	5	1	0	0	—		—		—		5	1
Juniors OÖ (loan)	2020–21	Austrian 2. Liga	9	2	0	0	—		—		—		9	2
Juniors OÖ (loan)	2021–22	Austrian 2. Liga	5	3	0	0	—		—		—		5	3
Juniors OÖ (loan)	Total		14	5	0	0	—		—		—		14	5
LASK	2021–22	Austrian Bundesliga	22	6	3	0	—		7 (Note: Appearances in UEFA Conference League)	3	—		32	9
LASK	2022–23	Austrian Bundesliga	31	14	5	3	—		—		—		36	17
LASK	2023–24	Austrian Bundesliga	1	0	—		—		—		—		1	0
LASK	Total		54	20	8	3	—		7	3	—		69	26
Reims	2023–24	Ligue 1	25	4	0	0	—		—		—		25	4
Reims	2024–25	Ligue 1	32	11	6	1	—		—		2 (Note: Appearances in Ligue 1 relegation/promotion play-offs)	0	40	12
Reims	2025–26	Ligue 2	29	14	3	0	—		—		—		32	14
Reims	Total		86	29	9	1	—		—		2	0	97	30
Lyon	2026–27	Ligue 1	5	0	0	0	—		3 (Note: Appearances in UEFA Europa League)	1	—		8	1
Career total			205	60	20	9	12	4	10	4	2	0	239	77

=== International ===
As of match played 14 November 2026

Appearances and goals by national team and year
National team	Year	Apps	Goals
Japan	2023	4	4
Japan	2024	10	4
Japan	2025	8	2
Japan	2026	12	2
Total		34	12

Scores and results list Japan's goal tally first, score column indicates score after each Nakamura goal.

List of international goals scored by Keito Nakamura
No.	Date	Venue	Cap	Opponent	Score	Result	Competition
1	15 June 2023	Toyota Stadium, Toyota, Japan	2	El Salvador	5–0	6–0	2023 Kirin Challenge Cup
2	12 September 2023	Cegeka Arena, Genk, Belgium	3	Turkey	2–0	4–2	2023 Kirin Challenge Cup
3	12 September 2023	Cegeka Arena, Genk, Belgium	3	Turkey	3–0	4–2	2023 Kirin Challenge Cup
4	13 October 2023	Denka Big Swan Stadium, Niigata, Japan	4	Canada	3–0	4–1	2023 Mizuho Blue Dream Match
5	1 January 2024	Japan National Stadium, Tokyo, Japan	5	Thailand	2–0	5–0	Friendly
6	14 January 2024	Al Thumama Stadium, Doha, Qatar	6	Vietnam	3–2	4–2	2023 AFC Asian Cup
7	6 June 2024	Thuwunna Stadium, Yangon, Myanmar	9	Myanmar	1–0	5–0	2026 FIFA World Cup qualification
8	6 June 2024	Thuwunna Stadium, Yangon, Myanmar	9	Myanmar	5–0	5–0	2026 FIFA World Cup qualification
9	14 October 2025	Ajinomoto Stadium, Chōfu, Japan	20	Brazil	2–2	3–2	2025 Kirin Challenge Cup
10	18 November 2025	Japan National Stadium, Tokyo, Japan	22	Bolivia	3–0	3–0	2025 Kirin Challenge Cup
11	14 June 2026	AT&T Stadium, Arlington, United States	26	Netherlands	1–1	2–2	2026 FIFA World Cup
12	14 November 2026	National Stadium, Kallang, Singapore	34	Brazil	2–0	3–2	2026 Mizuho Blue Challenge

== Honours ==
Reims

- Coupe de France runner-up: 2024–25

Individual

- Japan Pro-Footballers Association awards: Best XI (2024)
