= Marin Ljubičić (footballer, born 2002) =

Croatian footballer

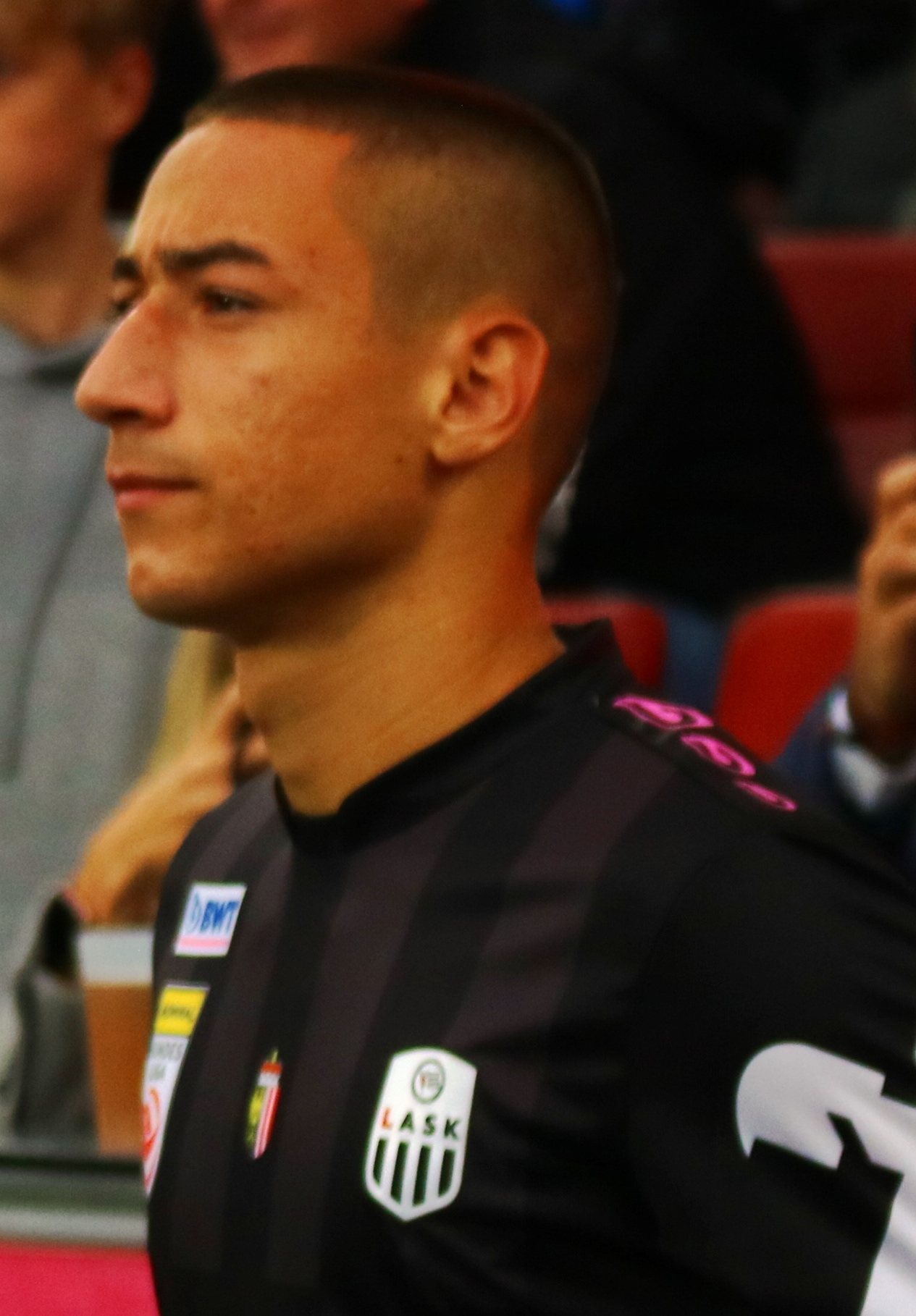
- Ljubičić with LASK in 2023

Personal information
- Date of birth: 28 February 2002 (age 24)
- Place of birth: Split, Croatia
- Height: 1.83 m (6 ft 0 in)
- Position: Centre forward

Team information
- Current team: Union Berlin
- Number: 27

Youth career
- -2021: Hajduk Split

Senior career*
| Years | Team | Apps | (Gls) |
| 2020 | Hajduk Split II | 1 | (0) |
| 2021–2022 | Hajduk Split | 37 | (3) |
| 2022 | → LASK (loan) | 14 | (9) |
| 2023–2025 | LASK | 61 | (19) |
| 2025– | Union Berlin | 18 | (3) |
| 2026 | → Fortuna Düsseldorf (loan) | 10 | (0) |

International career^{‡}
| 2021 | Croatia U20 | 1 | (0) |
| 2021–2024 | Croatia U21 | 19 | (9) |
| 2022 | Croatia U23 | 1 | (0) |
- * Club domestic league appearances and goals as of 11 September 2026 ‡ National team caps and goals as of 11 October 2024

Marin Ljubičić (born 28 February 2002) is a Croatian professional footballer who plays as a centre forward for Bundesliga club Union Berlin.

== Club career ==
Nicknamed "the Split Mbappé", Ljubičić was born and raised in Split to family from Runovići. His great performances for the Hajduk U19s earned him a promotion to the senior team in spring 2021, during the tenure of Paolo Tramezzani. He made his debut for senior Hajduk side on 2 March 2021, in a 3–0 Croatian Cup victory over Zagreb, coming off the bench in the 79th minute and replacing Mehmet Umut Nayir. Ljubičić made his senior league debut for Hajduk on 20 March 2021, in a Dalmatian derby against Šibenik at Stadion Poljud. He came off the bench in the 62nd minute, replacing Tonio Teklić, and converted Mario Vušković's cross to score the only goal in the 1–0 victory. He was praised by Inter Milan winger Ivan Perišić after the performance. On 29 March, Ljubičić signed a contract with the club until 2026.

On 22 July 2021, in his European debut in a Conference League qualifier, Ljubičić scored a brace in a 2–0 victory over Tobol.

On 2 February 2025, Ljubičić signed with Union Berlin in Germany. On 30 January 2026, he was loaned by Fortuna Düsseldorf in 2. Bundesliga until the end of the season.

== Career statistics ==
As of match played 11 September 2026

Appearances and goals by club, season and competition
| Club | Season | League | | | National cup (Note: Includes Croatian Football Cup, Austrian Cup, DFB-Pokal) | | Continental | | Total | |
| Club | Season | Division | Apps | Goals | Apps | Goals | Apps | Goals | Apps | Goals |
|---|---|---|---|---|---|---|---|---|---|---|
| Hajduk Split II | 2020–21 | Druga HNL | 1 | 0 | — | | — | | 1 | 0 |
| Hajduk Split | 2020–21 | Prva HNL | 7 | 1 | 1 | 0 | — | | 8 | 1 |
| Hajduk Split | 2021–22 | Prva HNL | 30 | 2 | 4 | 4 | 2 (Note: Appearances in UEFA Europa Conference League) | 2 | 36 | 8 |
| Hajduk Split | Total | | 37 | 3 | 5 | 4 | 2 | 2 | 44 | 9 |
| LASK (loan) | 2022–23 | Austrian Bundesliga | 14 | 9 | 3 | 4 | — | | 17 | 13 |
| LASK | 2022–23 | Austrian Bundesliga | 14 | 3 | 2 | 0 | — | | 16 | 3 |
| LASK | 2023–24 | Austrian Bundesliga | 31 | 12 | 3 | 2 | 7 (Note: Appearances in UEFA Europa League) | 1 | 41 | 15 |
| LASK | 2024–25 | Austrian Bundesliga | 16 | 4 | 1 | 0 | 6 (Note: Two appearances in UEFA Europa League, four appearances in UEFA Conference League) | 0 | 23 | 4 |
| LASK | Total | | 61 | 19 | 6 | 2 | 13 | 2 | 80 | 22 |
| Union Berlin | 2024–25 | Bundesliga | 13 | 1 | — | | — | | 13 | 1 |
| Union Berlin | 2025–26 | Bundesliga | 2 | 2 | — | | — | | 2 | 2 |
| Union Berlin | 2026–27 | Bundesliga | 3 | 0 | 1 | 2 | — | | 4 | 2 |
| Union Berlin | Total | | 18 | 3 | 1 | 2 | — | | 19 | 5 |
| Fortuna Düsseldorf (loan) | 2025–26 | 2. Bundesliga | 10 | 0 | — | | — | | 10 | 0 |
| Career total | | | 141 | 34 | 15 | 12 | 15 | 3 | 171 | 49 |

== Honours ==
Hajduk Split

- Croatian Cup: 2021–22
