= Rene Renner =

Austrian footballer

René Renner
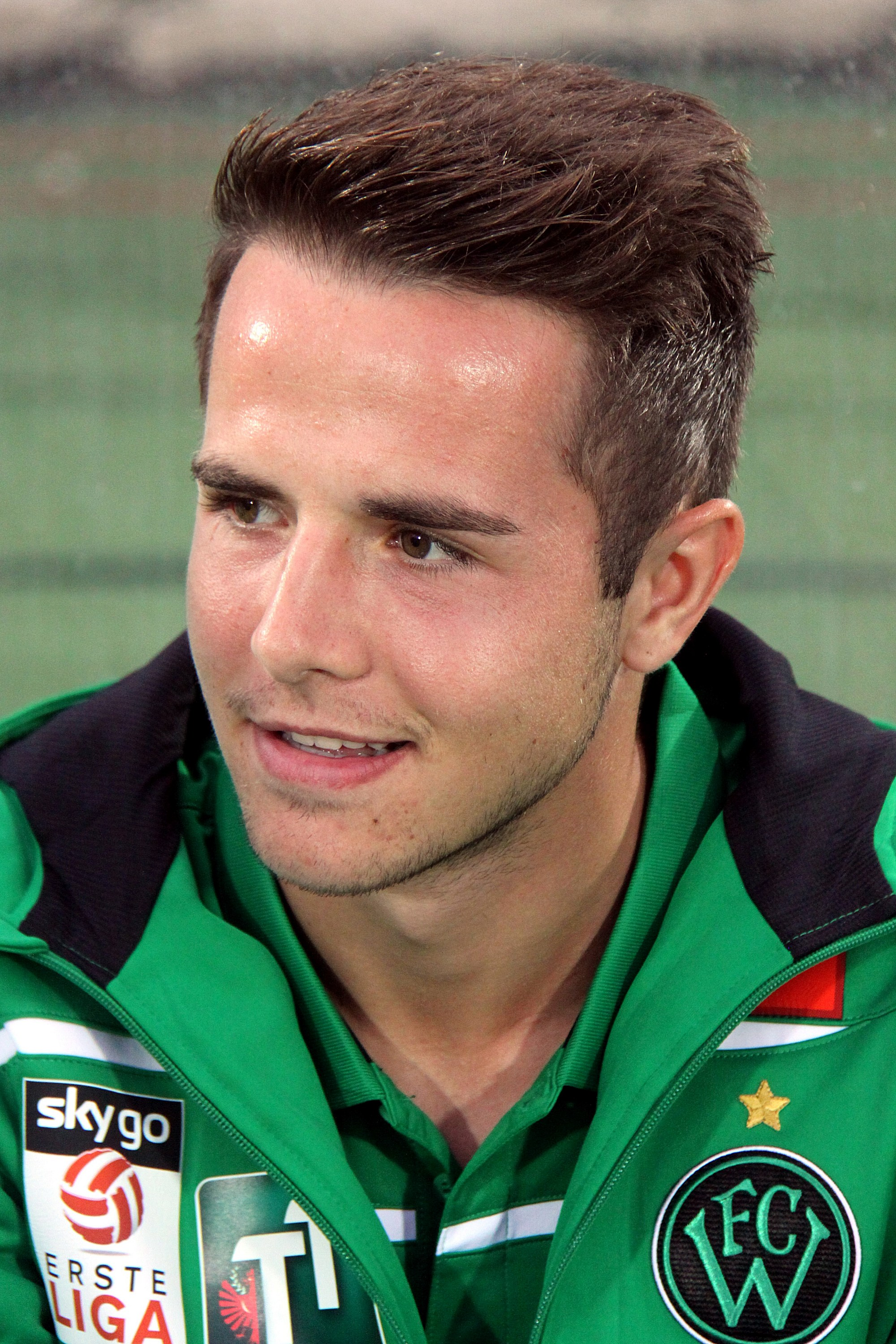
- Renner in 2015

Personal information
- Date of birth: 29 November 1993 (age 32)
- Place of birth: Wels, Austria
- Height: 1.81 m (5 ft 11 in)
- Position: Left back

Team information
- Current team: Wolfsberger
- Number: 77

Youth career
- 2002–2010: SV Wallern
- 2010: ASKÖ Donau Linz

Senior career*
Years	Team	Apps	(Gls)
2010–2011	ASKÖ Donau Linz	2	(0)
2011–2012	ASKÖ SV Viktoria Marchtrenk		
2012–2013	St. Florian	37	(4)
2013–2014	SV Wallern	28	(5)
2014–2016	Wacker Innsbruck	41	(4)
2016–2017	Blau-Weiß Linz	27	(5)
2017–2019	SV Mattersburg	51	(5)
2019–2024	LASK	122	(3)
2025–2025	Buriram United	0	(0)
2025–	Wolfsberger	30	(3)
- * Club domestic league appearances and goals as of 15 August 2026

René Renner (born 29 November 1993) is an Austrian footballer who plays as a left back for Austrian Bundesliga club Wolfsberger.

== Club career ==
Renner joined LASK on 24 June 2019. Renner made his first Austrian Bundesliga match against LASK against SCR Altach on 28 July 2019.

On 11 May 2021, Renner extended his contract with LASK until 2024.

Renner signed a new contract with LASK on 26 May 2023, extending to 2026. The contract was terminated by mutual consent on 27 December 2024.

== Career statistics ==
=== Club ===
As of match played 23 August 2023

Appearances and goals by club, season and competition
Club	Season	League			National Cup (Note: Includes Austrian Cup)		Europe		Other		Total	
Club	Season	Division	Apps	Goals	Apps	Goals	Apps	Goals	Apps	Goals	Apps	Goals
Union St. Florian	2011–12	Austrian Regionalliga	9	1	0	0	—		—		9	1
Union St. Florian	2012–13	Austrian Regionalliga	28	3	2	1	—		—		30	4
Union St. Florian	Total		37	4	2	1	—		—		39	5
SV Wallern	2013–14	Austrian Regionalliga	28	6	—		—		—		28	6
Wacker Innsbruck II	2014–15	Austrian Regionalliga	7	0	—		—		—		7	0
Wacker Innsbruck II	2015–16	Austrian Regionalliga	2	0	—		—		—		2	0
Wacker Innsbruck II	Total		9	0	—		—		—		9	0
Wacker Innsbruck	2014–15	2. Liga	25	4	2	0	—		—		27	4
Wacker Innsbruck	2015–16	2. Liga	16	0	3	0	—		—		19	0
Wacker Innsbruck	Total		41	4	5	0	—		—		46	4
BW Linz	2016–17	2. Liga	27	5	3	0	—		—		30	5
SV Mattersburg	2017–18	Austrian Bundesliga	21	0	4	0	—		—		25	0
SV Mattersburg	2018–19	Austrian Bundesliga	30	5	2	0	—		1 (Note: Appearance(s) in play-off)	0	33	5
SV Mattersburg	Total		51	5	6	0	—		1	0	58	5
LASK	2019–20	Austrian Bundesliga	26	0	4	0	12 (Note: Four appearances in UEFA Champions League, eight appearances in UEFA Europa League)	0	—		42	0
LASK	2020–21	Austrian Bundesliga	29	2	6	0	7 (Note: Appearance(s) in UEFA Europa League)	1	—		42	3
LASK	2021–22	Austrian Bundesliga	28	0	4	2	12 (Note: Appearance(s) in UEFA Conference League)	0	1	0	45	2
LASK	2022–23	Austrian Bundesliga	29	1	5	1	—		—		34	2
LASK	Total		112	3	19	3	31	1	1	0	163	7
Career total			305	27	35	4	31	1	2	0	373	32

== Honours ==
Buriram United

- ASEAN Club Championship: 2024–25
