= Nemanja Čelić =

Austrian footballer

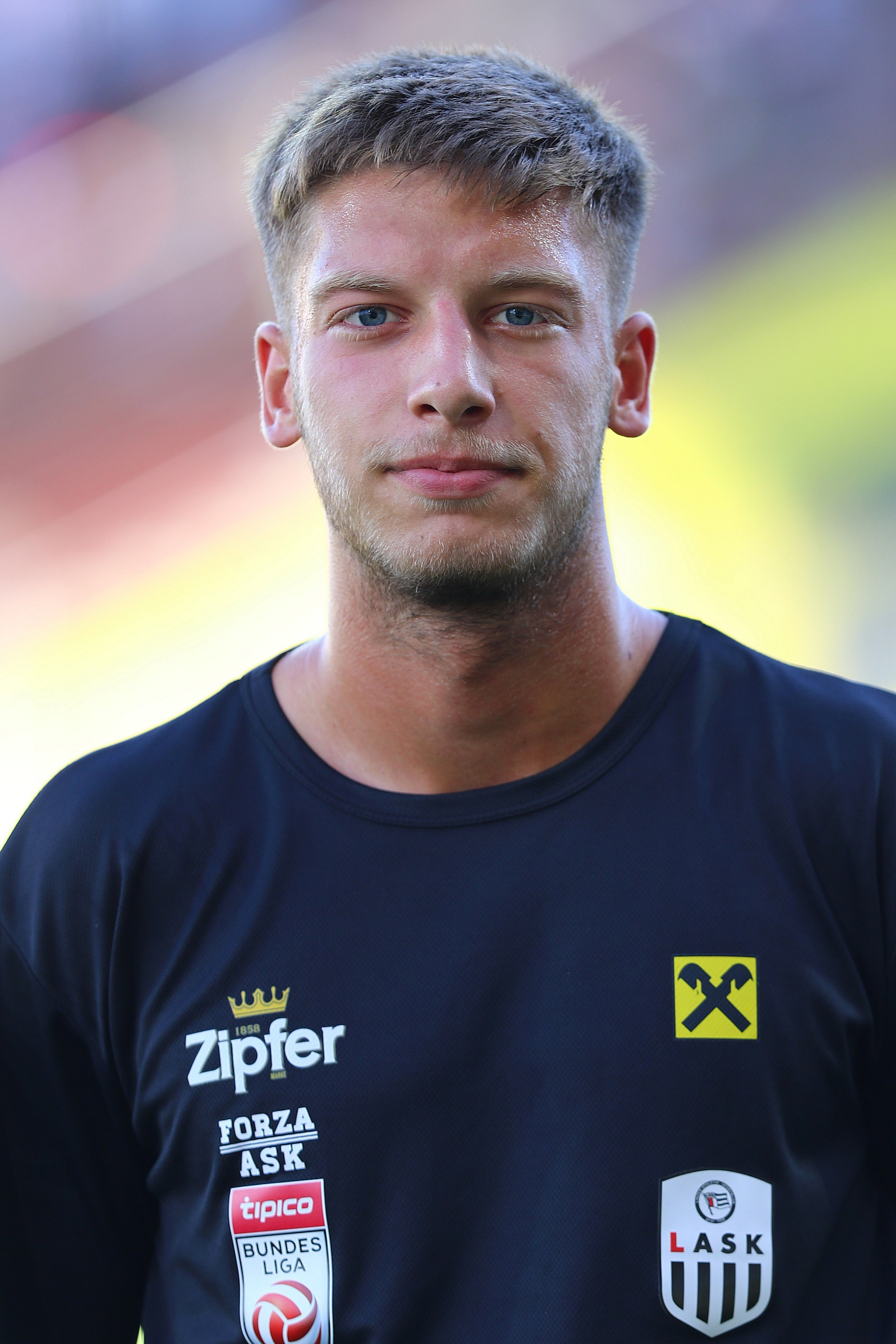
- Čelić in 2018

Personal information
- Date of birth: 26 April 1999 (age 27)
- Place of birth: Linz, Austria
- Height: 1.85 m (6 ft 1 in)
- Position: Midfielder

Team information
- Current team: WSG Tirol
- Number: 43

Senior career*
Years	Team	Apps	(Gls)
2017–2020	Juniors OÖ	70	(5)
2017–2020	LASK	3	(0)
2020–2021	WSG Swarovski Tirol	29	(1)
2021–2023	Darmstadt 98	14	(0)
2022–2023	→ LASK (loan)	7	(0)
2023–2025	SV Ried	45	(0)
2026	SKN St. Pölten	9	(0)
2026–	WSG Tirol	2	(0)
- * Club domestic league appearances and goals as of 7 August 2026

Nemanja Čelić (Serbian Cyrillic: Немања Челић; born 26 April 1999) is an Austrian professional footballer who plays as a midfielder for Austrian Bundesliga club WSG Tirol.

== Club career ==
In the summer of 2022, Čelić returned to LASK on a season-long loan with an option to buy.

On 1 September 2023, Čelić signed a two-year contract with SV Ried.

== Personal life ==
Born in Austria, Čelić is of Serbian descent.
