= 2018–19 Austrian Cup =

Tournament details
- Country: Austria
- Teams: 64

Final positions
- Champions: Red Bull Salzburg
- Runners-up: Rapid Wien

Tournament statistics
- Top goal scorer(s): João Victor (6 goals)

The 2018–19 Austrian Cup was the 88th edition of the national cup in Austrian football. The champions of the cup earned a place in the 2019–20 Europa League and would have begun play in the Group stage. Sixty–four clubs participated in this season's cup competition.

Sturm Graz were the defending champions after winning the competition in the previous season by defeating Red Bull Salzburg in the final. Times up to 27 October 2018 and from 31 March 2019 are CEST (UTC+2). Times from 28 October 2018 to 30 March 2019 are CET (UTC+1).

== First round ==
Thirty–two first round matches were played between 20 and 22 July 2018.

20 July 2018	Leobendorf (R)	2–0	Neuberg (A)	Leobendorf
18:45	Zöch 51'; Konrad 77'	Report		Stadium: Sportplatz Leobendorf

20 July 2018	SAK Klagenfurt (A)	1–0	Völkermarkt (R)	Klagenfurt Wörthersee
19:00	Bürgler 33'	Report		Stadium: Sportplatz Welzenegg

20 July 2018	Reichenau (A)	3–5	Kapfenberger SV (R)	Innsbruck
19:00	Glänzer 33'; Steinkeller 49'; Kovatsch 86'	Report	Sabitzer 7'; Sencar 17'; Herić 23'; Eloshvili 75', 90+3'	Stadium: Kunstrasen Reichenau

20 July 2018	Grödig (2)	1–3 (a.e.t.)	TSV Hartberg (A)	Grödig
19:30	Nika 63'	Report	Tadić 35', 102' (pen.); Rotter 116'	Stadium: DAS GOLDBERG

20 July 2018	Maria Saal (R)	0–6	St. Pölten (1)	Maria Saal
19:30		Report	Gartler 39' (pen.), 67' (pen.), 75'; Balić 75', 87'; Ljubicic 82'	Stadium: Sportplatz Maria Saal

20 July 2018	Allerheiligen (R)	1–3	SV Mattersburg (A)	Allerheiligen bei Wildon
20:00	Zubak 24'	Report	Kvasina 6', 90+1'; Ortiz 33'	Stadium: Sportanlage Allerheiligen

20 July 2018	Deutschlandsberger (A)	4–2	Amstetten (2)	Deutschlandsberg
20:00	Grubisic 13', 25'; Dengg 33'; Zisser 75'	Report	Markic 61'; Uhlig 79'	Stadium: Koralmstadion

20 July 2018	Ebreichsdorf (A)	1–2	Vorwärts Steyr (2)	Weigelsdorf
20:00	Wimmer 67' (o.g.)	Report	Efendioğlu 37', 57'	Stadium: Sportzentrum Ebreichsdorf

20 July 2018	Neusiedl 1919 (R)	1–0	Admira Wacker Mödling (1)	Neusiedl am See
20:00	Bozkurt 70' (pen.)	Report		Stadium: Sportzentrum Neusiedl

20 July 2018	Schwaz (R)	2–0	Dornbirn 1913 (R)	Schwaz
20:00	Hänsler 2'; Kinzner 11'	Report		Stadium: Silberstadt Arena Schwaz

20 July 2018	Hertha (R)	0–3	LASK (1)	Wels
20:00		Report	Otubanjo 13', 29'; João Victor 70'	Stadium: Mauth Stadion

20 July 2018	Mauerwerk (A)	0–2	Wiener Neustadt (2)	Schwechat
20:30		Report	Podhorín 8'; Stefel 80'	Stadium: Rudolf-Tonn

20 July 2018	USV Mettersdorf (A)	0–1	Horn (2L)	Mettersdorf
20:30		Report	Paukner 57'	Stadium: Sportplatz USV Mettersdorf

20 July 2018	Kufstein (R)	0–5	Rapid Wien (1)	Kufstein
21:20		Report	Ivan 5', 62'; Berisha 19'; Alar 34', 58'	Stadium: Kufstein-Arena

21 July 2018	Dornbirner SV (A)	0–6	Ried (2L)	Dornbirn
16:00		Report	Pecirep 19' (pen.), 70'; Mayer 26', 76'; Grgic 80'; Surdanovic 84'	Stadium: Sportplatz Hella

21 July 2018	USK Anif (R)	0–3	WSG Wattens (2L)	Anif
17:00		Report	Zankl 16' (o.g.); Jurdík 41'; Jaúregui 90'	Stadium: Sportzentrum Anif

21 July 2018	Union Vöcklamarkt (A)	4–0	Alberschwende (A)	Vöcklamarkt
17:00	K. Sohm 10' (o.g.); Gilhofer 28'; Höltschl 43'; Johnson 67'	Report		Stadium: Sportzentrum Union Volksbank

21 July 2018	Siegendorf (A)	0–2	Sturm Graz (1)	Parndorf
17:30		Report	Pink 25'; Hierländer 51'	Stadium: Heidebodenstadion

21 July 2018	FC Kitzbühel (R)	2–4 (a.e.t.)	Lafnitz (2L)	Kitzbühel
17:30	Margić 90+3'; Baur 90+6'	Report	Kröpfl 32' (pen.); Zivotic 90'; Ried 100'; Kogler 115' (o.g.)	Stadium: Sportplatz langau

21 July 2018	VfB Hohenems (R)	2–5	Floridsdorfer AC (2L)	Hohenems
18:00	Stefanon 28'; Fessler 52'	Report	Yilmaz 3'; Markoutz 22', 31', 48'; Pajaczkowski 38'	Stadium: Herrenriedstadion

21 July 2018	Stadl-Paura (R)	1–1 (a.e.t.) (5–3 p)	Blau-Weiß Linz (2L)	Stadl-Paura
18:00	Roman 89'	Report	Ebenhofer 66'	Stadium: Molto Luce Arena Stadl-Paura

21 July 2018	Traiskirchen (R)	0–2	Austria Klagenfurt (2L)	Traiskirchen
19:30		Report	König 77' (o.g.); Pichler 89'	Stadium: Sport – und Freizeitzentrum

21 July 2018	Lendorf (R)	0–2	Bruck/Leitha (R)	Lendorf
20:00		Report	Burusic 17'; Maroši 36'	Stadium: Thomas-Morgenstern-Arena

21 July 2018	Saalfelden (R)	4–0	Strasswalchen	Sportanlage Bürgerau
20:00	Herzog 6'; Tandari 35', 90+2'; Hasic 87'	Report

22 July 2018	Austria XIII (A)	0–4	Austria Wien (B1)	Wien
12:00		Report	Friesenbichler 12'; Turgeman 71'; Matić 86' (pen.); Grünwald 90+3'	Stadium: Sportclub-Platz

22 July 2018	Parndorf 1919 (R)	0–3	Rheindorf Altach (B1)	Parndorf
17:30		Report	Grbić 5'; Netzer 32'; Lienhart 78'	Stadium: Heidebodenstadion

22 July 2018	Oedt (A)	0–6	Red Bull Salzburg (B1)	Transdanubia Sportanlage
18:15		Report	Schlager 10', 65'; Yabo 45', 63'; Prevljak 73'; Dabbur 78' (pen.)

30 July 2018	Stadlau (R)	2–1 (a.e.t.)	Gleisdorf 09 (R)	Wien
18:30	Topcic 105'; Grassl 116' (o.g.)	Report	Gräfischer 96'	Stadium: OMV-Sportanlage Stadlau

== Second round ==
Fifteen second round matches were played 25 September 2018.

24 September 2018	SAK Klagenfurt (A)	1–5	Floridsdorfer AC (2L)	Wien
19:30	Camber 76'	Report	Hautzinger 18'; Ceglaj 45+1' (o.g.); Umjenovic 55'; Becirovic 63' (pen.); Sobczyk 74' (pen.)	Stadium: Job Consulting Arena

25 September 2018	Leobendorf (R)	1–2	Rheindorf Altach (B1)	Leobendorf
17:00	Konrad 84'	Report	Nutz 34'; Aigner 44'	Stadium: Sportplatz Leobendorf

25 September 2018	Bruck/Leitha (R)	1–3	Austria Lustenau (2L)	Bruck
19:00	Majtán 75'	Report	Ronivaldo Bernardo 33', 45+1'; Djurić 84'	Stadium: Parkstadion Bruck

25 September 2018	Wolfsberger AC (1B)	4–0	Austria Klagenfurt (2L)	Wolfsberg
19:00	Gschweidl 3', 49'; Wernitznig 15'; Liendl 35' (pen.)	Report		Stadium: Lavanttal Arena

25 September 2018	TSV Hartberg (A)	3–0	WSG Wattens (2L)	Hartberg
20:00	Tadić 5'; Sanogo 19'; Rep 30'	Report		Stadium: PROfertil ARENA

25 September 2018	Deutschlandsberger (A)	3–4 (a.e.t.)	Wiener Neustadt (2)	Deutschlandsberger
20:00	Wotolen 19'; Oparenovič 54'; Dengg 90+5'	Report	Hager 24'; Cheukoua 38'; Tartarotti 49'; Salihi 118'	Stadium: Koralmstadion

25 September 2018	Union Vöcklamarkt (A)	0–1	Ried (2L)	Vöcklamarkt
20:00		Report	Mayer 26'	Stadium: Sportzentrum Union Volksbank

25 September 2018	Horn (2L)	0–2	Lafnitz (2L)	Horn
20:30		Report	Zivotic 32'; Klem 46'	Stadium: Waldviertler Volksbank Arena

25 September 2018	Grazer AK (R)	0–0 (a.e.t.) (4–2 p)	Vorwärts Steyr (2)	Graz
21:45		Report		Stadium: Sportzentrum Graz-Wienzödl

26 September 2018	Neusiedl 1919 (R)	1–3	Wacker Innsbruck (1)	Neusiedl am See
20:00	Bozkurt 37'	Report	Buchacher 5'; Eler 6'; Rieder 12'	Stadium: Sportzentrum Neusiedl

26 September 2018	Stadlau (R)	0–4	Kapfenberger SV (2)	Wien
17:00		Report	Skrivanek 2', 25'; Feyrer 54'; Milici 84'	Stadium: OMV-Sportanlage Stadlau

26 September 2018	SV Mattersburg (A)	1–1 (a.e.t.) (4–5 p)	Rapid Wien (1)	Mattersburg
19:30	Kvasina 45+2'	Report	Knasmüllner 38'	Stadium: Pappelstadion

26 September 2018	Stadl-Paura (R)	0–8	LASK (1)	Stadl-Paura
20:00		Report	Goiginger 17', 26'; João Victor 42', 66'; Ramsebner 54'; Otubanjo 60'; Jamnig 76', 77'	Stadium: Molto Luce Arena Stadl-Paura

26 September 2018	Saalfelden (R)	0–5	St. Pölten (1)	Sportanlage Bürgerau
20:00		Report	Ambichl 12', 70'; Balić 34', 67'; Schütz 87'

26 September 2018	Schwaz (R)	0–6	Red Bull Salzburg (B1)	Schwaz
21:30		Report	Minamino 28'; Prevljak 39'; Mwepu 63'; Szoboszlai 69'; Junuzović 81'; Leitgeb 87'	Stadium: Silberstadt Arena Schwaz

26 September 2018	Austria Wien (B1)	2–0	Sturm Graz (1)	Wien
21:30	Friesenbichler 62'; Prokop 65'	Report		Stadium: Generali Arena

== Third round ==
The eight third round matches were played on 30 October 2018.

30 October 2018	Austria Wien (B1)	3–1	Floridsdorfer AC (2L)	Vienna
	Monschein 2', 65'; Ewandro 44'	Report	Markoutz 45'	Stadium: Generali Arena

30 October 2018	Grazer AK (R)	3–0	Kapfenberger SV (2)	Graz
	Perchtold 43'; Elsneg 86', 87'	Report		Stadium: Sportzentrum Graz-Weinzödl

30 October 2018	Lafnitz (2L)	2–3	St. Pölten (1)	Lafnitz
	Krznarić 63'; Zivotic 69'	Report	Ambichl 8'; Balić 59'; Gartler 82'	Stadium: Sportplatz Lafnitz

30 October 2018	Austria Lustenau (2L)	0–1	Red Bull Salzburg (B1)	Lustenau
		Report	Minamino 74'	Stadium: Planet Pure Stadium

30 October 2018	TSV Hartberg (A)	4–3	Wacker Innsbruck (1)	Hartberg
	Ilić 12'; Schubert 28'; Rasswalder 66'; Kröpfl 89'	Report	Eler 14'; Vallci 61', 74'	Stadium: PROfertil ARENA

30 October 2018	Wolfsberger AC (1B)	0–3	Rapid Wien (1)	Wolfsberg
		Report	Pavlović 22', 45+1'; Knasmüllner 53'	Stadium: Lavanttal Arena

30 October 2018	Ried (2L)	1–2	Wiener Neustadt (2)	Ried im Innkreis
	Pecirep 32' (pen.)	Report	Tartarotti 13'; Harrer 61'	Stadium: josko ARENA

30 October 2018	Rheindorf Altach (B1)	0–3	LASK (1)	Altach
		Report	Trauner 19'; João Victor 32' (pen.); Tetteh 78'	Stadium: CASHPOINT Arena

== Quarter-finals ==
The four quarter-finals matches were played from 15 to 17 February 2019.

15 February 2019	Grazer AK (R)	2–1	Austria Wien (B1)	Graz
	Perchtold 57'; Kirič 86'	Report	Prokop 15'	Stadium: Merkur-Arena

16 February 2019	LASK (1)	6–0	St. Pölten (1)	Linz
	João Victor 24', 42'; Goiginger 31', 61'; João Klauss 35'; Tetteh 70'	Report		Stadium: Waldstadion Pasching

17 February 2019	Rapid Wien (1)	5–2	TSV Hartberg (A)	Vienna
	Murg 43', 90+1'; Pavlović 49', 74'; Hofmann 52'	Report	Martic 69' (o.g.); Rasswalder 82'	Stadium: Allianz Stadion

17 February 2019	Wiener Neustadt (2)	1–2	Red Bull Salzburg (B1)	Wiener Neustadt
	Hager 89'	Report	Szoboszlai 48'; Dabbur 55'	Stadium: Stadion Wiener Neustadt

== Semi-finals ==
2 April 2019	Grazer AK (R)	0–6	Red Bull Salzburg (B1)	Graz
		Report	Dabbur 6', 26'; Wolf 13', 66'; Minamino 45'; Daka 90+2'	Stadium: Merkur-Arena; Attendance: 13,310; Referee: Gerhard Grobelnik

2 April 2019	LASK (1)	1–1 (a.e.t.) (3–4 p)	Rapid Wien (1)	Linz
	Goiginger 16'	Report	Hofmann 54'	Stadium: Waldstadion; Referee: Markus Hameter
	Penalties
	Goiginger (penalty scored); Holland (penalty missed); Tetteh (penalty missed); Frieser (penalty scored); Ullmann (penalty scored)		(penalty scored) Murg; (penalty scored) Schwab; (penalty missed) Grahovac; (penalty scored) Pavlović; (penalty scored) Barać

== Final ==
1 May 2019
17:30

Red Bull Salzburg (B1)	2–0	Rapid Wien (1)
Farkas 37'; Dabbur 39'	Report

Wörthersee Stadion, Klagenfurt
Attendance: 24,200
Referee: Manuel Schüttengruber

GK	1	(Austria) Alexander Walke (c)		(yellow card) 90+2'
RB	22	(Austria) Stefan Lainer
CB	6	(Cameroon) Jérôme Onguéné
CB	15	(Brazil) André Ramalho
LB	25	(Austria) Patrick Farkas		(yellow card) 45+2' (yellow-red card) 83'
MF	42	(Austria) Xaver Schlager
MF	8	(Mali) Diadie Samassékou
MF	16	(Austria) Zlatko Junuzovic	(substituted off) 72'
MF	13	(Austria) Hannes Wolf	(substituted off) 67'
FW	9	(Israel) Mu'nas Dabbur		(yellow card) 90+5'
FW	21	(Norway) Fredrik Gulbrandsen	(substituted off) 76'	(yellow card) 74'
Substitutes:
GK	1	(Austria) Cican Stankovic
CB	5	(Austria) Albert Vallci
FW	11	(Bosnia and Herzegovina) Smail Prevljak
MF	14	(Hungary) Dominik Szoboszlai	(substituted on) 72'
MF	18	(Japan) Takumi Minamino	(substituted on) 67'
FW	20	(Zambia) Patson Daka	(substituted on) 76'
CM	45	(Zambia) Enock Mwepu
Manager:
(Germany) Marco Rose

GK	1	(Austria) Richard Strebinger
RB	3	(Turkey) Mert Müldür	(yellow card) 61'
CB	20	(Austria) Maximilian Hofmann	(yellow card) 90+5'
CB	6	(Austria) Mario Sonnleitner	(substituted off) 86'
LB	5	(Belgium) Boli Bolingoli
MF	14	(Bosnia and Herzegovina) Srdjan Grahovac
MF	39	(Austria) Dejan Ljubicic	(substituted off) 64'
MF	8	(Austria) Stefan Schwab (c)
RW	10	(Austria) Thomas Murg
FW	22	(Serbia) Andrija Pavlovic	(substituted off) 70'
LW	7	(Austria) Philipp Schobesberger
Substitutes:
CB	17	(Austria) Christopher Dibon
LB	19	(Austria) Marvin Potzmann
GK	21	(Austria) Tobias Knoflach
RB	24	(Austria) Stephan Auer
FW	27	(Senegal) Aliou Badji	(substituted on) 70'
MF	28	(Austria) Christoph Knasmüllner	(substituted on) 64'
FW	97	(Romania) Andrei Ivan	(substituted on) 86'
Manager:
(Austria) Dietmar Kühbauer

Match rules

- 90 minutes.
- 30 minutes of extra time if necessary.
- Penalty shoot-out if scores still level.
- Seven named substitutes, of which up to four may be used.

== See also ==
- 2018–19 Austrian Football Bundesliga
