= 2016–17 Austrian Football First League =

Austrian Football First League
- Season: 2016–17
- Champions: LASK
- Promoted: LASK
- Relegated: SV Horn
- Matches: 180
- Goals: 516 (2.87 per match)
- Top goalscorer: Patrik Eler (24 goals)
- Biggest home win: WSG Wattens 5–0 FC Liefering (31 March 2017)
- Biggest away win: 0–3 (9 matches)
- Highest scoring: FC Liefering 3–5 SC Austria Lustenau (1 November 2016)

The 2016–17 Austrian Football First League (German: Erste Liga, also known as Sky Go Erste Liga due to sponsorship) was the 43rd season of the Austrian second-level football league. It began on 22 July 2016 and ended on 26 May 2017. The fixtures were announced on 17 June 2016.

== Teams ==
Ten teams participate in the 2016-17 season. WSG Wattens, FC Blau-Weiß Linz and SV Horn were directly promoted after winning the 2015–16 Austrian Regional Leagues. SV Grödig were relegated from the 2015–16 Bundesliga; however, they withdrew to the Austrian Regional League.

Location of teams in the 2016–17 Austrian Football First League

Club Name	City	Stadium	Capacity
Austria Lustenau	Lustenau	Reichshofstadion	8,800
FC Blau-Weiß Linz	Linz	Donauparkstadion	2,000
Floridsdorfer AC	Vienna	FAC-Platz	3,000
SV Horn	Horn	Waldviertler Volksbank Arena	3,500
Kapfenberger SV	Kapfenberg	Franz-Fekete-Stadion	12,000
LASK	Linz	Waldstadion Pasching	7,870
Liefering	Salzburg	Untersberg-Arena	4,128
Wacker Innsbruck	Innsbruck	Tivoli-Neu	30,000
Wiener Neustadt	Wiener Neustadt	Stadion Wiener Neustadt	10,000
WSG Wattens	Wattens	Alpenstadion	5,500

=== Personnel and kits ===
Club	Manager	Captain	Kit Manufacturer	Sponsors
Austria Lustenau	(Germany) Daniel Ernemann	(Austria) Christoph Stückler	Nike	Mohren
FC Blau-Weiß Linz	(Austria) Klaus Schmidt	(Austria) Florian Maier	Uhlsport	Linz AG
Floridsdorfer	(Austria) Franz Maresch	(Austria) Sascha Viertl	Puma	Wiener Städtische
SV Horn	(Japan) Hamayoshi Masanori	(Austria) Aleksandar Đorđević	Mizuno	United Nations (17 Global Goals)
Kapfenberger	(Bosnia and Herzegovina) Abdulah Ibraković	(Austria) Christoph Nicht	Erima	Murauer Bier
Linz	(Austria) Oliver Glasner	(Austria) Pavao Pervan	Jako	Zipfer
Liefering	(Austria) Thomas Letsch	(Brazil) Luan	Nike	Red Bull
Wacker Innsbruck	(Austria) Karl Daxbacher	(Austria) Alexander Hauser	Jako	Tiroler Wasserkraft
WSG Wattens	(Austria) Thomas Silberberger	(Germany) Ferdinand Oswald	Puma	PAPSTAR
Wiener Neustadt	(Czech Republic) René Wagner	(Austria) Remo Mally	Puma	Baumit

== League table ==
Pos	Team	Pld	W	D	L	GF	GA	GD	Pts	Promotion or relegation
1	LASK (C, P)	36	23	8	5	77	42	+35	77	Promoted to 2017–18 Austrian Bundesliga
2	FC Liefering	36	17	9	10	58	49	+9	60	Ineligible for promotion
3	SC Austria Lustenau	36	15	12	9	58	49	+9	57	
4	FC Wacker Innsbruck	36	15	9	12	58	53	+5	54	
5	WSG Wattens	36	13	12	11	56	54	+2	51	
6	Kapfenberger SV (Note: Kapfenberger SV were initially deducted six points for license violations. The penalty was reduced to four points on appeal.)	36	12	9	15	47	57	−10	41	
7	FC Blau-Weiß Linz	36	8	15	13	41	45	−4	39	
8	SC Wiener Neustadt	36	11	6	19	40	62	−22	39	
9	Floridsdorfer AC	36	10	8	18	39	48	−9	38	
10	SV Horn (R)	36	9	6	21	42	57	−15	33	Relegated to 2017–18 Austrian Regionalliga

Source: Austrian Football First League
Rules for classification: 1) Points; 2) Less matches awarded against; 3) Goal difference; 4) Goals scored; 5) Matches won; 6) Away matches won; 7) Head-to-head points; 8) Head-to-head goal difference; 9) Head-to-head goals scored.
(C) Champions; (P) Promoted; (R) Relegated

== Results ==
Teams played each other four times in the league. In the first half of the season each team played every other team twice (home and away), and then did the same in the second half of the season.

=== First half of season ===
Home \ Away	ALU	BWL	FLO	SVH	KAP	LIN	LIE	WKR	WN	WAT
Austria Lustenau		0–0	1–1	2–1	1–3	1–1	1–1	2–2	1–0	4–0
FC Blau-Weiß Linz	1–1		0–0	1–0	0–1	2–0	1–1	2–2	0–1	0–3
Floridsdorfer AC	1–3	2–1		2–1	0–1	2–3	1–5	3–1	1–1	1–1
SV Horn	1–3	2–1	2–1		1–2	1–4	2–3	2–1	0–1	2–0
Kapfenberger SV	0–1	2–2	2–0	1–0		1–2	1–0	1–1	3–1	3–0
LASK Linz	3–1	2–1	1–0	1–1	3–1		3–3	1–0	2–2	4–0
Liefering	3–5	2–0	2–1	1–0	2–0	4–2		1–2	3–1	0–0
Wacker Innsbruck	0–1	1–1	2–1	0–0	1–0	2–1	1–1		3–2	1–2
Wiener Neustadt	1–4	3–2	0–3	2–1	2–0	1–2	1–4	2–2		2–1
WSG Wattens	2–4	0–0	0–0	2–2	3–3	3–2	1–1	2–1	0–1	

Updated to match(es) played on 18 November 2016. Source: Austrian Football First League (in German)
Legend: Blue = home team win; Yellow = draw; Red = away team win.

=== Second half of season ===
Home \ Away	ALU	BWL	FLO	SVH	KAP	LIN	LIE	WKR	WN	WAT
Austria Lustenau		1–4	0–0	2–3	0–0	2–4	2–0	2–1	2–0	2–2
FC Blau-Weiß Linz	0–0		0–0	1–4	1–2	1–1	0–3	3–1	3–0	0–0
Floridsdorfer AC	1–0	1–2		0–2	3–1	1–3	0–3	1–2	3–0	0–2
SV Horn	1–2	0–2	0–2		2–1	1–2	0–1	1–2	2–0	2–3
Kapfenberger SV	2–3	3–2	0–1	1–1		2–2	0–3	1–3	0–3	2–1
LASK Linz	2–0	4–0	2–2	2–1	1–1		3–0	3–1	1–0	2–0
Liefering	4–1	0–3	1–0	1–1	1–1	0–3		0–3	2–1	2–3
Wacker Innsbruck	1–0	2–1	2–1	3–0	3–3	2–3	0–2		2–2	0–1
Wiener Neustadt	1–1	0–0	0–3	3–1	3–1	0–2	0–1	1–3		2–0
WSG Wattens	2–2	3–3	1–0	1–1	4–1	2–0	5–0	3–4	3–0	

Updated to match(es) played on 26 May 2017. Source: Austrian Football First League (in German)
Legend: Blue = home team win; Yellow = draw; Red = away team win.

== Season statistics ==
=== Top goalscorers ===
As of 26 May 2017.

Rank	Scorer	Club	Goals
1	(Slovenia) Patrik Eler	Innsbruck	24
2	(Austria) René Gartler	LASK	21
3	(Ghana) Raphael Dwamena	Lustenau	18
4	(Brazil) João Victor Santos Sá	KSV	14
4	(Albania) Mërgim Berisha	Liefering	14
6	(Brazil) Fabiano de Lima Campos Maria	LASK	12
6	(Slovakia) Milan Jurdík	Wattens	12
8	(Austria) Christian Gebauer	Wattens	10
8	(Ghana) Samuel Tetteh	Liefering	10
8	(Brazil) Bruno Felipe Souza Da Silva	Lustenau	10

=== Top assists ===
As of 26 May 2017.

Rank	Scorer	Club	Assists
1	(Austria) Marco Sahanek	FAC	11
1	(Austria) Benjamin Pranter	Wattens	11
3	(Austria) Thomas Goiginger	BW Linz	10
4	(France) Dimitry Imbongo	LASK	8
4	(Austria) Florian Toplitsch	Wattens	8
6	5 players		6

== Attendances ==
Pos	Team	Total	High	Low	Average	Change
1	Wacker Innsbruck	53,743	9,284	1,915	2,985	−21.3%
2	LASK Linz	51,159	5,196	1,813	2,842	−17.7%
3	Austria Lustenau	43,347	2,910	1,427	2,408	−5.6%
4	WSG Wattens	27,924	5,028	828	1,551	n/a^{1}
5	FC Blau-Weiß Linz	27,457	7,006	660	1,525	n/a^{1}
6	SV Horn	16,763	1,252	467	931	n/a^{1}
7	Kapfenberger SV	13,947	1,317	446	774	+1.8%
8	Wiener Neustadt	13,842	1,400	425	769	−21.0%
9	Floridsdorfer AC	12,824	1,945	288	712	−8.8%
10	Liefering	5,808	688	176	322	−55.2%
	League total	266,814	9,284	176	1,482	−17.8%

Source: bundesliga.at
Notes:
1: Team played last season in Regionalliga

== See also ==
- 2016–17 Austrian Football Bundesliga
- 2016–17 Austrian Cup
