= Maršov =

- Municipality
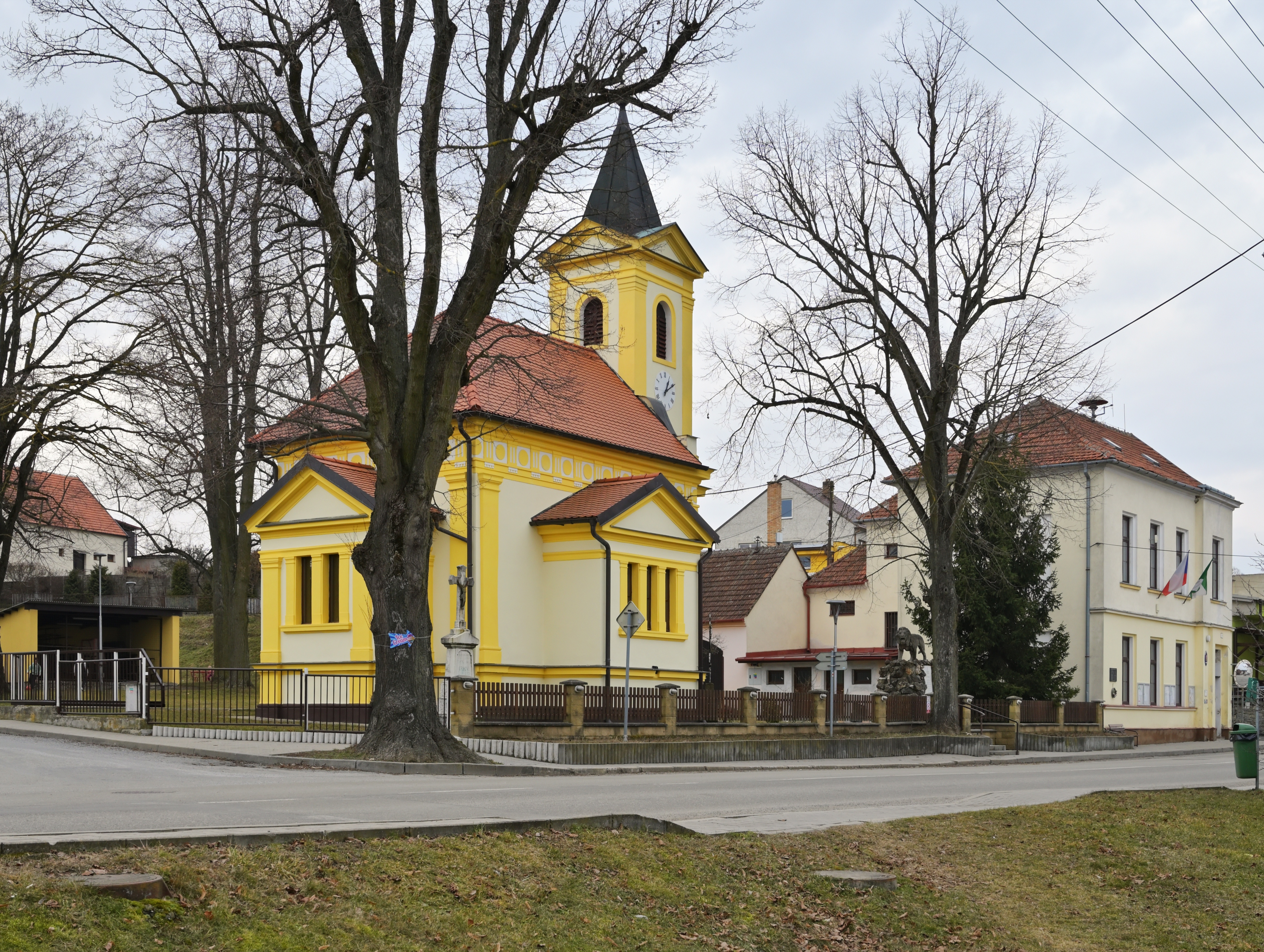
- Centre of Maršov

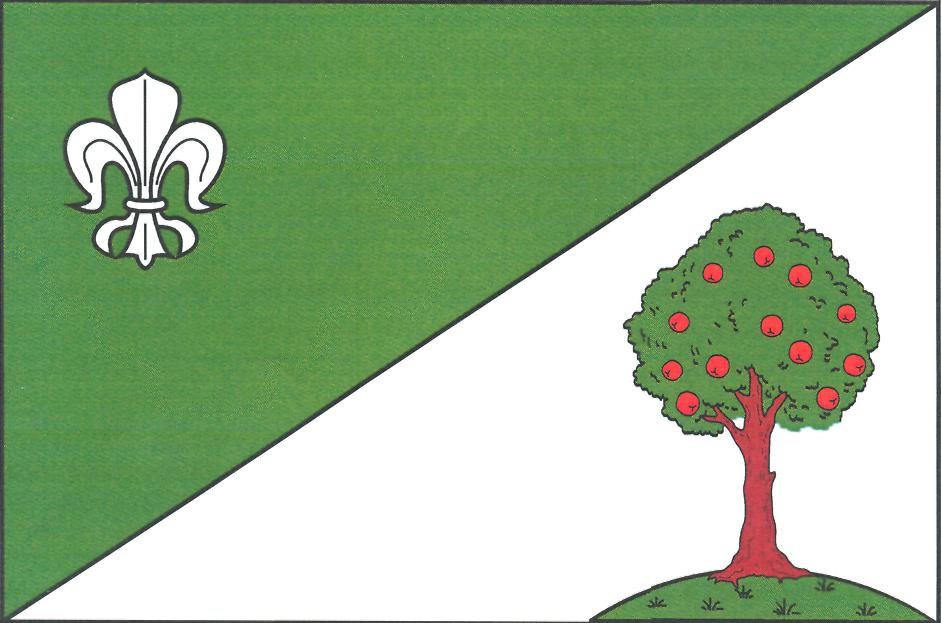
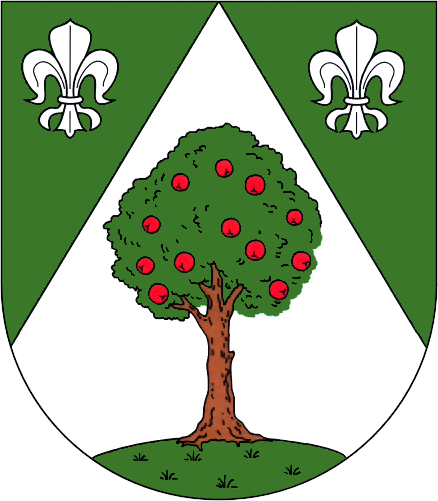
- Flag Coat of arms

- Location in the Czech Republic
- Coordinates: 49°17′1″N 16°21′35″E
- Country: Czech Republic
- Region: South Moravian
- District: Brno-Country
- First mentioned: 1299

Area
  - Total: 7.49 km^{2} (2.89 sq mi)
- Elevation: 467 m (1,532 ft)

Population (2026-01-01)
  - Total: 530
  - Density: 71/km^{2} (180/sq mi)
- Time zone: UTC+1 (CET)
  - Summer (DST): UTC+2 (CEST)
- Postal code: 664 71
- Website: www.marsov.cz

Maršov is a municipality and village in Brno-Country District in the South Moravian Region of the Czech Republic. It has about 500 inhabitants.

== Etymology ==
The name Maršov is derived from the personal name Mareš, meaning "Mareš's village".

== Geography ==
Maršov is located about 17 kilometres (11 mi) northwest of Brno. It lies in the Křižanov Highlands. The highest point is the hill Krajina at 514 m (1,686 ft) above sea level. The stream Maršovský potok originates here and flows to the north. The stream Bílý potok flows along the southern municipal border.

In the eastern part of the municipality is a lake called Kaolínové jezírko. It was created artificially by flooding a kaolin mine.

== History ==
The first written mention of Maršov is from 1299. Until the establishment of an independent municipality in 1848, Maršov belonged to the Deblín estate and shared its owners. From the 16th century, the estate was owned by the city of Brno.

== Demographics ==
Historical population

Year	Pop.	±%
1869	531	—
1880	648	+22.0%
1890	637	−1.7%
1900	625	−1.9%
1910	638	+2.1%

Year	Pop.	±%
1921	640	+0.3%
1930	567	−11.4%
1950	531	−6.3%
1961	575	+8.3%
1970	529	−8.0%

Year	Pop.	±%
1980	467	−11.7%
1991	428	−8.4%
2001	448	+4.7%
2011	475	+6.0%
2021	526	+10.7%

Source: Censuses

== Transport ==
There are no railways or major roads passing through the municipality.

== Sights ==
The only protected cultural monument in the municipality is a cholera cemetery. It is a place of reverence where victims of the cholera epidemic of the mid-19th century were buried.

The main landmark of Maršov is the Chapel of the Assumption of the Virgin Mary. It was built in 1908.
