= Eggenberger =

Eggenberger may refer to:

- Balthasar Eggenberger (died 1493), Austrian entrepreneur in the early days of mercantilism
- Katrin Eggenberger (born 1982), a Swiss-Liechtensteiner academic and politician
- Rudolf Eggenberger (born 1946), Austrian football manager
- Eggenberger Motorsport, Swiss motor racing team

== See also ==
- Eggenberg (disambiguation)
