= Leitl =

Leitl is a surname. Notable people with the surname include:

- Christoph Leitl (born 1949), Austrian politician
- Lester Leitl (1899–1980), American football player and coach
- Peter Leitl (born 1948), Austrian football player and manager
- Stefan Leitl (born 1977), German football player and manager
- Xavier Leitl, West German bobsledder
