= Kürsat Güclü =

Austrian-Turkish footballer

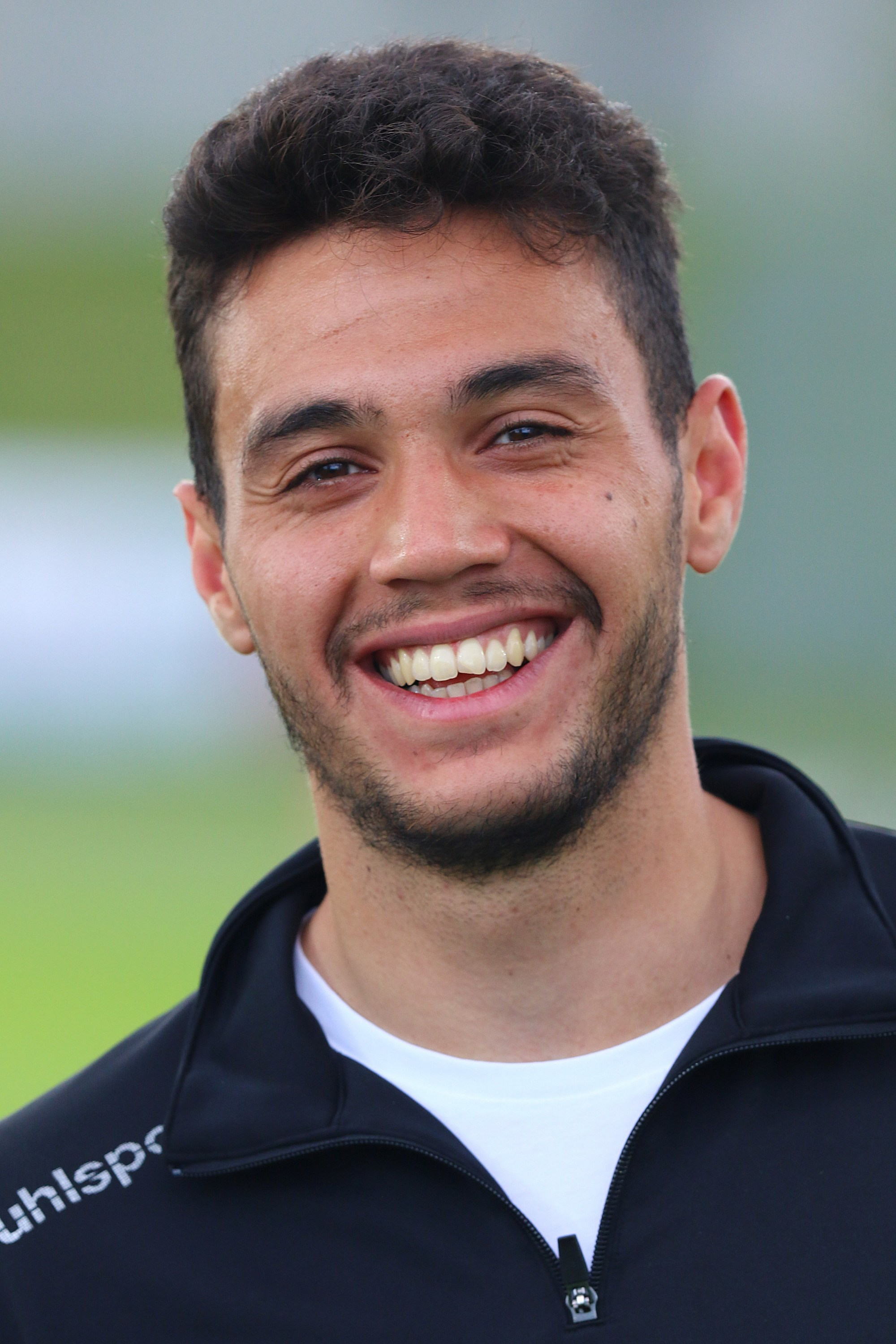
- Güclü in 2018

Personal information
- Date of birth: 13 May 1994 (age 32)
- Place of birth: Vienna, Austria
- Height: 1.80 m (5 ft 11 in)
- Position: Midfielder

Team information
- Current team: SV Horn
- Number: 8

Youth career
- 2002–2008: Team Wiener Linien
- 2008–2010: FavAC

Senior career*
Years	Team	Apps	(Gls)
2010–2012	FavAC		
2012–2013	Wiener Sport-Club		
2013–2015	SV Schwechat	39	(3)
2015–2017	First Vienna	38	(1)
2017–2018	Austria Lustenau	27	(0)
2018–2020	Mauerwerk	43	(9)
2020–2024	SV Stripfing	84	(6)
2024–2025	SV Lafnitz	6	(0)
2025	SV Lafnitz II	9	(2)
2025–	SV Horn	29	(5)
- * Club domestic league appearances and goals as of 27 June 2026

Kürsat Güclü (born 13 May 1994) is an Austrian-Turkish football player. He plays for SV Horn.

== Club career ==
He made his Austrian Football First League debut for SC Austria Lustenau on 21 July 2017 in a game against Floridsdorfer AC.

On 25 June 2025, Güclü joined SV Horn.
