= Maršovice (Benešov District) =

- Market town
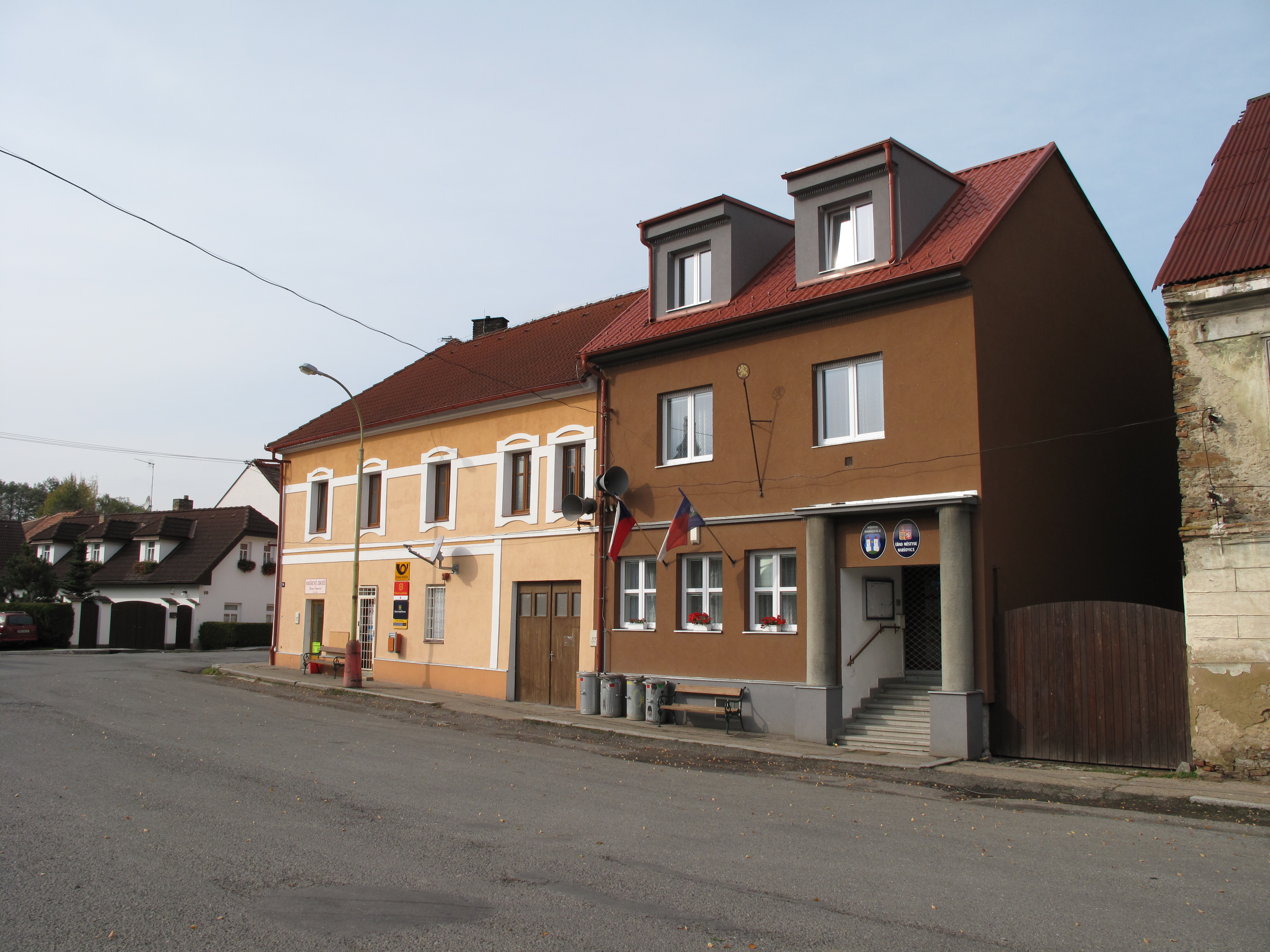
- Municipal office and post

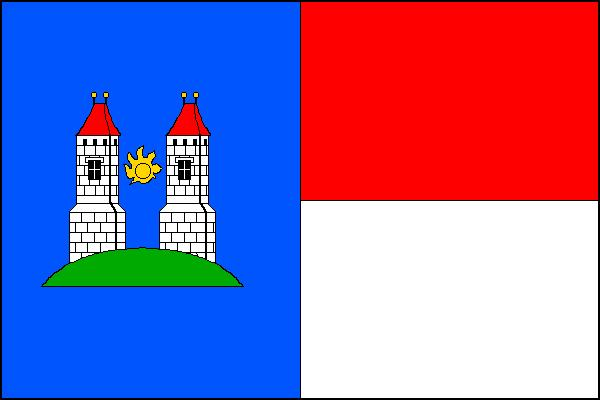
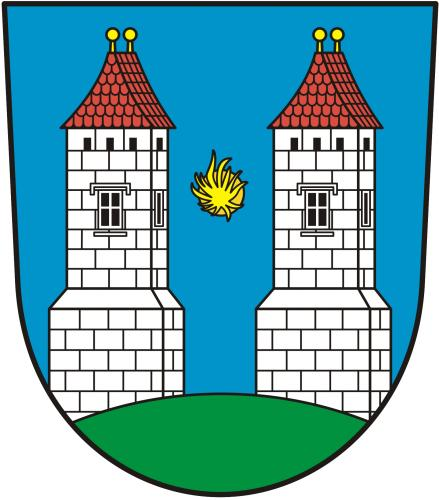
- Flag Coat of arms

- Location in the Czech Republic
- Coordinates: 49°42′49″N 14°33′52″E
- Country: Czech Republic
- Region: Central Bohemian
- District: Benešov
- First mentioned: 1205

Area
  - Total: 24.19 km^{2} (9.34 sq mi)
- Elevation: 389 m (1,276 ft)

Population (2026-01-01)
  - Total: 796
  - Density: 32.9/km^{2} (85.2/sq mi)
- Time zone: UTC+1 (CET)
  - Summer (DST): UTC+2 (CEST)
- Postal codes: 257 51, 257 53, 257 55, 257 56
- Website: www.mestysmarsovice.cz

Maršovice (Czech pronunciation: [ˈmarʃovɪtsɛ]) is a market town in Benešov District in the Central Bohemian Region of the Czech Republic. It has about 800 inhabitants.

== Administrative division ==
Maršovice consists of 16 municipal parts (in brackets population according to the 2021 census):

- Maršovice (272)
- Bezejovice (9)
- Dlouhá Lhota (46)
- Libeč (28)
- Mstětice (57)
- Podmaršovice (11)
- Řehovice (52)
- Strnadice (49)
- Tikovice (6)
- Vráce (7)
- Záhoří (21)
- Zahrádka (30)
- Zaječí (38)
- Zálesí 1.díl (6)
- Zálesí 2.díl (0)
- Zderadice (86)

== Etymology ==
The name Maršovice is derived from the personal name Mareš, meaning "the village of Mareš's people".

== Geography ==
Maršovice is located about 12 kilometres (7 mi) southwest of Benešov and 35 km (22 mi) south of Prague. It lies in a hilly landscape of the Benešov Uplands. The highest point is a nameless hill at 522 m (1,713 ft) above sea level.

== History ==
The first written mention of Maršovice is from 1205. The village was promoted to a market town in 1568 by Emperor Maximilian II.

== Demographics ==
Historical population

Year	Pop.	±%
1869	1,936	—
1880	2,138	+10.4%
1890	2,131	−0.3%
1900	1,982	−7.0%
1910	1,771	−10.6%

Year	Pop.	±%
1921	1,668	−5.8%
1930	1,522	−8.8%
1950	1,114	−26.8%
1961	1,122	+0.7%
1970	933	−16.8%

Year	Pop.	±%
1980	803	−13.9%
1991	725	−9.7%
2001	685	−5.5%
2011	706	+3.1%
2021	718	+1.7%

Source: Censuses

== Transport ==
There are no railways or major roads passing through the municipality.

== Sights ==
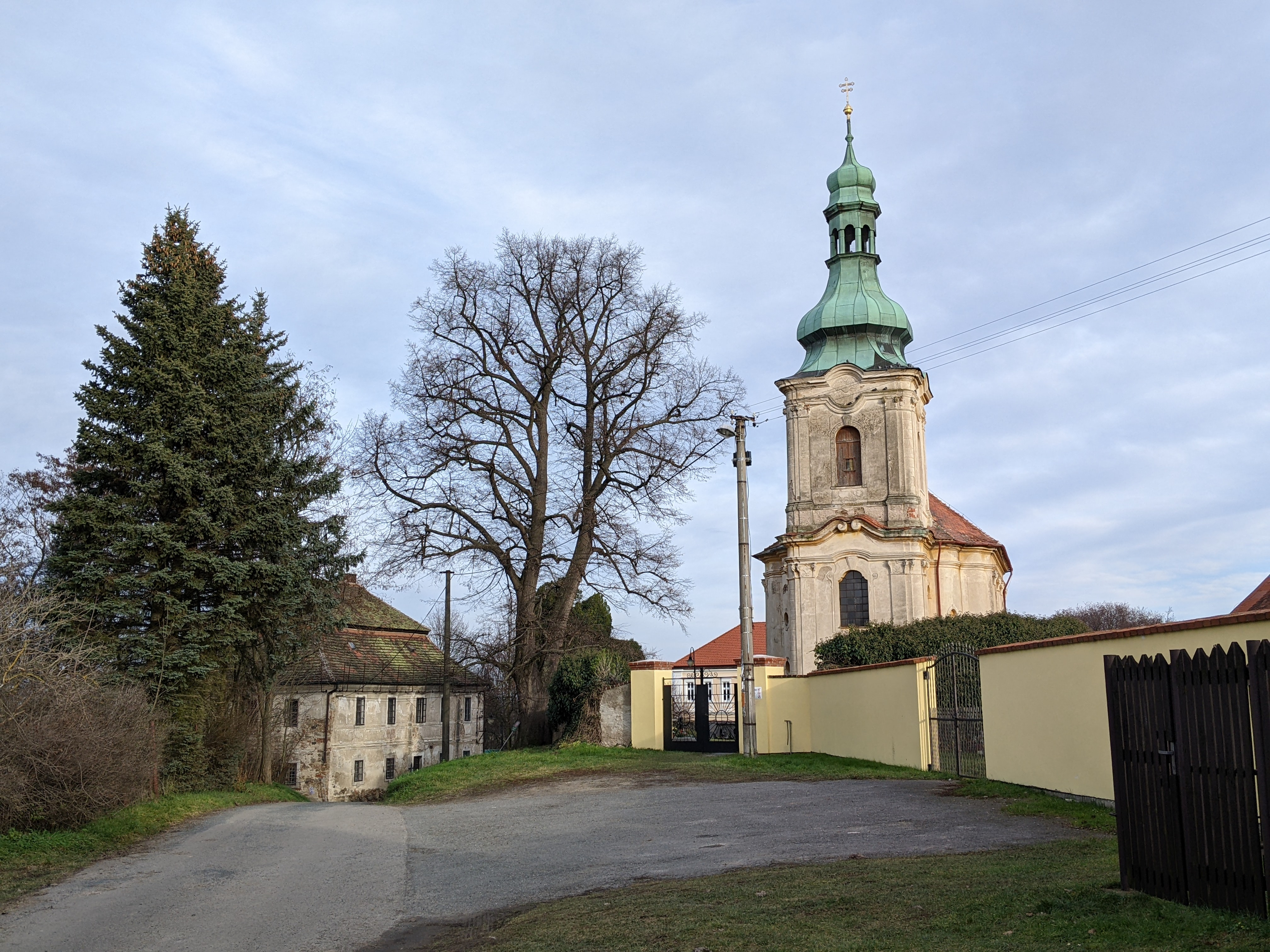
Church of the Annunciation of the Virgin Mary

The main landmark of Maršovice is the Church of the Annunciation of the Virgin Mary. It was built in the late Baroque style in 1774–1775.
