= Maresch =

Maresch is a German-language surname, a Germanized version of Czech surname Mareš. Notable people with the surname include:

- Anton Maresch (born 1991), Austrian basketball player
- Franz Maresch (born 1972), Austrian footballer and manager
- Rudolf Maresch (born 1934), Austrian cyclist
- Sven Maresch (born 1987), German judoka
