= Burak Yılmaz (footballer, born 1995) =

Austrian footballer

Personal information
- Date of birth: 7 February 1995 (age 31)
- Place of birth: Sankt Pölten, Austria
- Height: 1.70 m (5 ft 7 in)
- Position: Central midfielder

Team information
- Current team: Kremser SC
- Number: 17

Youth career
- –2004: SC St. Pölten
- 2004–2013: SKN St. Pölten

Senior career*
Years	Team	Apps	(Gls)
2013–2016	SKN St. Pölten II	65	(14)
2015–2016	SKN St. Pölten	6	(0)
2016	SK Austria Klagenfurt	15	(2)
2017–2018	SKN St. Pölten II	38	(1)
2018–2020	Floridsdorfer AC	59	(4)
2020–2021	Turgutluspor	14	(0)
2021–2023	SV Horn	70	(9)
2023–2025	SKU Amstetten	54	(1)
2025–	Kremser SC	29	(3)

International career
2010	Austria U16	1	(0)
- * Club domestic league appearances and goals as of 28 June 2026

Burak Yılmaz (born 7 February 1995) is an Austrian professional footballer who plays as a central midfielder for Kremser SC.

Burak is of Turkish descent.
