= Andreas Singer =

Slovak footballer and manager

Personal information
- Date of birth: 16 June 1946 (age 80)
- Place of birth: Rožňava, Slovakia
- Position: Defender

Team information
- Current team: SVU Mauer (manager)

Managerial career
- Years: Team
- 1995–2000: SV Horn
- 2001–2004: FK Austria Wien U18
- 2004–2007: SC Neusiedl am See 1919
- 2007: UFC Pamhagen
- 2008: SV Gols
- 2009: USC Wallern
- 2010: SK Pama
- 2010–2011: FC Waidhofen/Ybbs
- 2011–2013: UFC St. Peter/Au
- 2013–2014: Union Hofstetten-Grünau
- 2015–2016: SVU Mauer

Andreas Singer (born 16 June 1946) is a Slovak football manager and former player.
