= Eggenberg =

Eggenberg may refer to:

== Places ==
- Eggenberg (Graz), Austria
  - Eggenberg Palace, Graz
- Eggenberg, Mühleberg, Berne, Switzerland
- Eggenberg House, in Sopron, Hungary

== Other uses ==
- Eggenberg family, an Austrian noble family first mentioned in 1432, including a list of people with the name
- Pivovar Eggenberg, a brewery in the Czech Republic
- Eggenberg Castle, Vorchdorf, a brewery in Austria

== See also ==
- Eggenberger (disambiguation)
