= Oliver Markoutz =

Austrian footballer

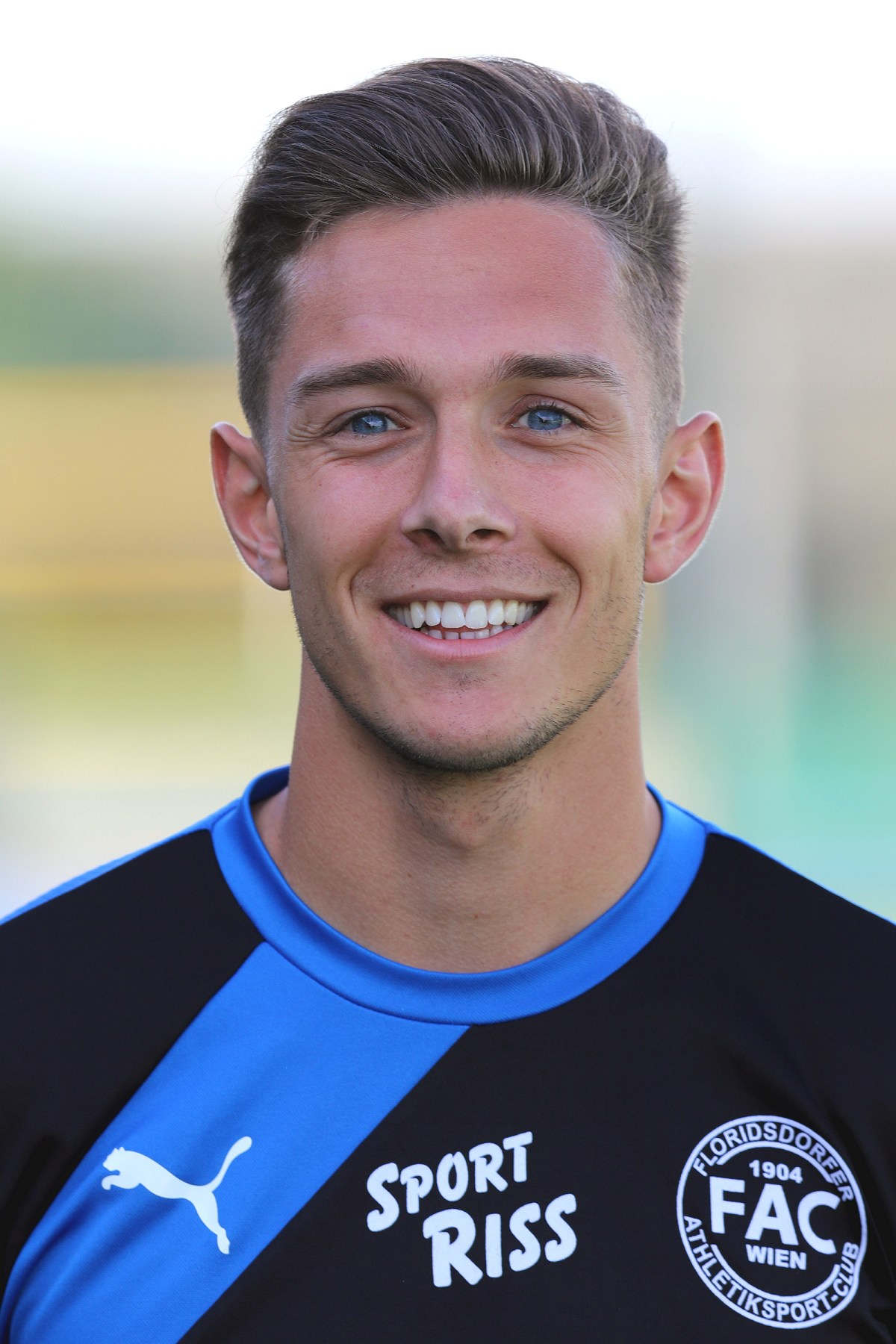

Personal information
- Date of birth: 14 January 1995 (age 31)
- Place of birth: Klagenfurt, Austria
- Height: 1.80 m (5 ft 11 in)
- Positions: Forward; winger

Team information
- Current team: Austria Klagenfurt
- Number: 16

Youth career
- 2003–2005: SV Gallizien
- 2005–2007: FC Kärnten
- 2007–2008: SK Austria Kärnten
- 2008–2011: Red Bull Salzburg
- 2011–2014: Bayern Munich

Senior career*
Years	Team	Apps	(Gls)
2014	Bayern Munich II	2	(1)
2015–2016	SKN St. Pölten II	30	(5)
2015–2016	SKN St. Pölten	6	(0)
2016–2019	Floridsdorfer AC	71	(13)
2016–	Austria Klagenfurt	16	(6)

International career
2010	Austria U-16	3	(3)
2011	Austria U-17	8	(4)
2012	Austria U-18	3	(1)
2013	Austria U-19	1	(0)
- * Club domestic league appearances and goals as of 21:53, 4 December 2019 (UTC)

Oliver Markoutz (born 14 January 1995) is an Austrian footballer who plays for Austria Klagenfurt.
