= Sascha Viertl =

Austrian footballer

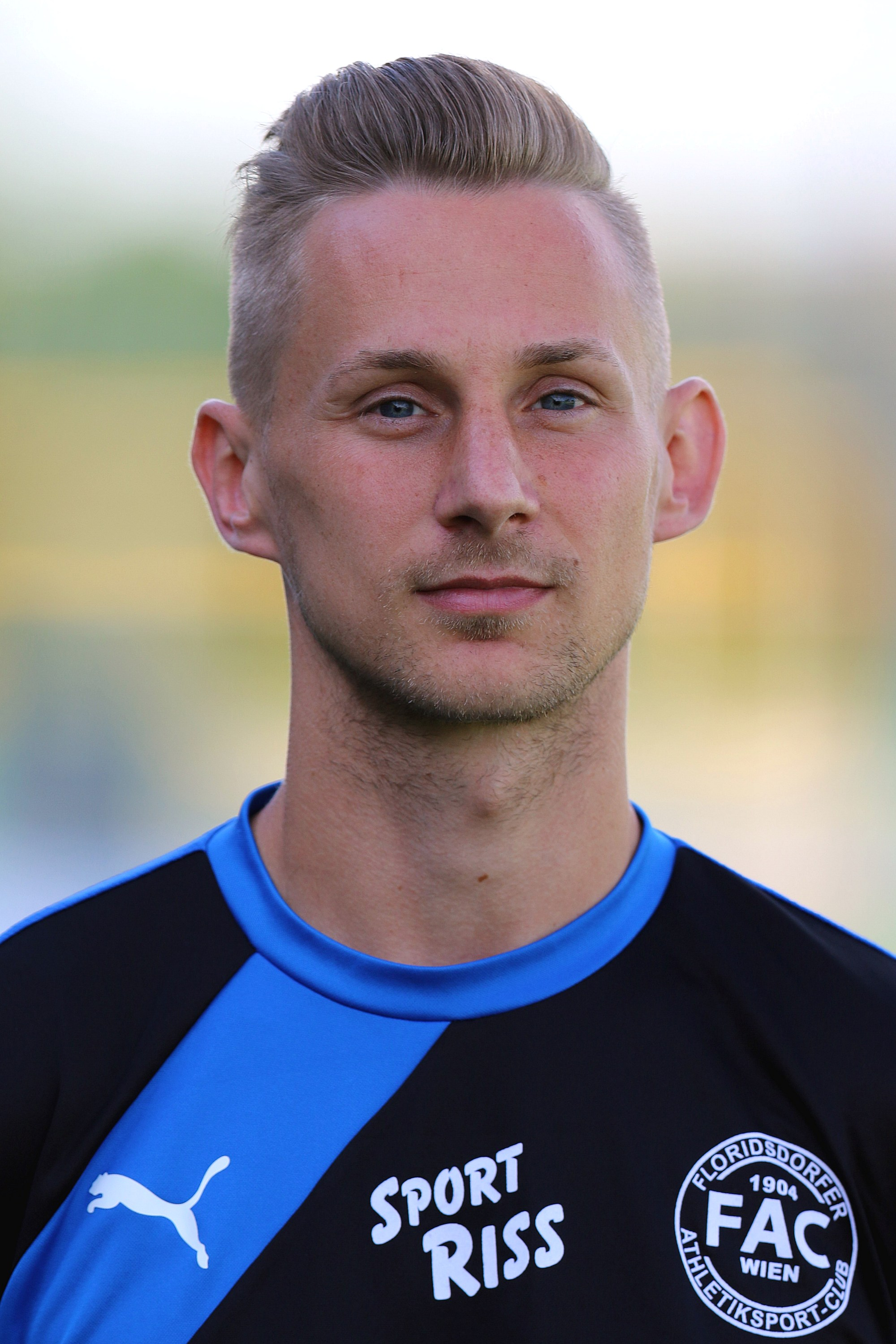
- Viertl in 2016

Personal information
- Date of birth: 1 November 1990 (age 35)
- Place of birth: Austria
- Height: 1.77 m (5 ft 9 1/2 in)
- Position: Midfielder

Team information
- Current team: SV Leobendorf
- Number: 8

Youth career
- 1997–2007: Austria Wien

Senior career*
Years	Team	Apps	(Gls)
2007	PSV Team für Wien	2	(0)
2007–2008	SC Mannswörth	9	(1)
2008–2017	Floridsdorfer AC	216	(8)
2017–	SV Leobendorf	91	(2)
- * Club domestic league appearances and goals as of 19:24, 27 March 2023 (UTC)

Sascha Viertl (born 1 November 1990) is an Austrian footballer who currently plays as a midfielder for SV Leobendorf.
