= Mario Konrad =

Austrian footballer

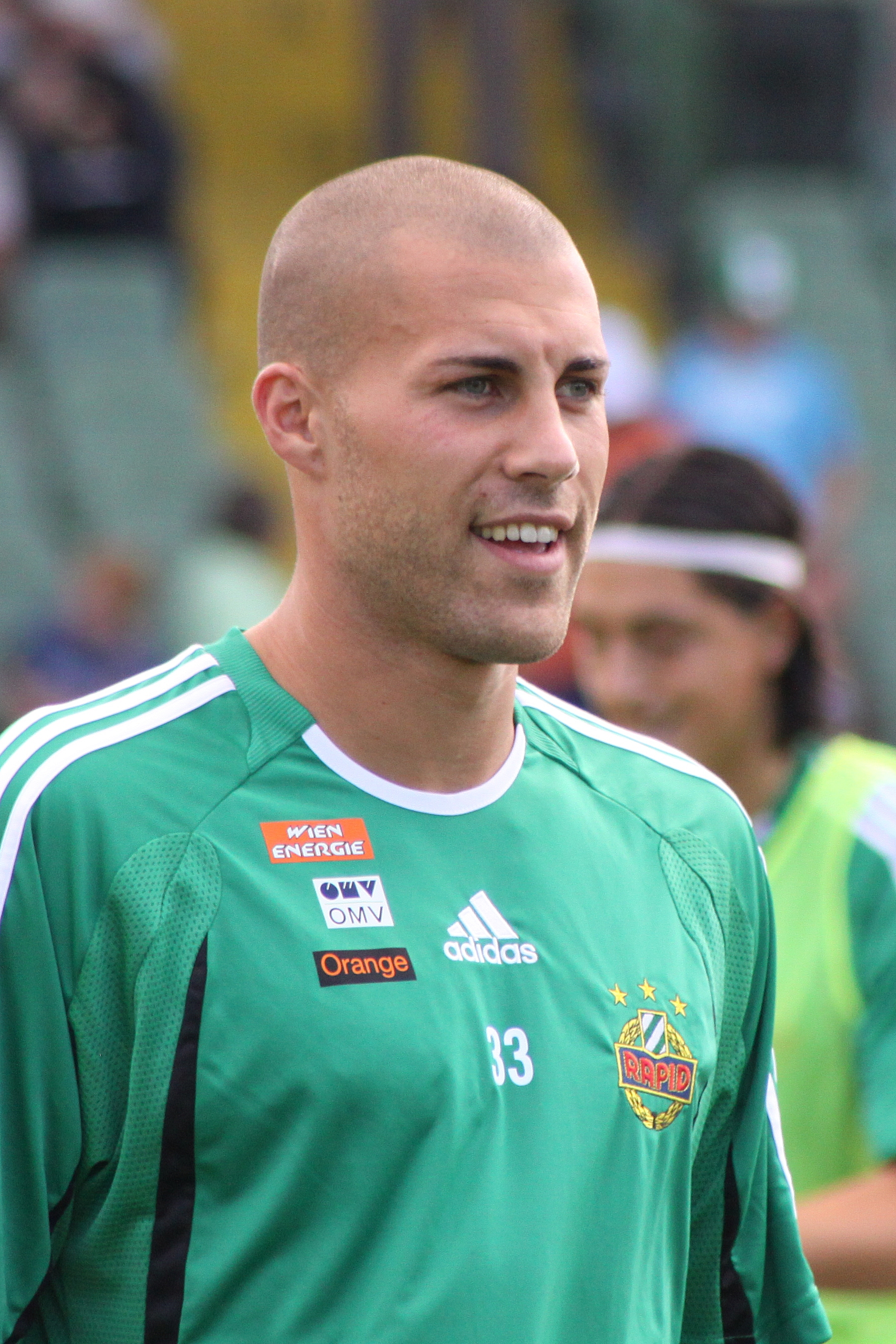

Personal information
- Date of birth: 22 January 1983 (age 43)
- Place of birth: Vienna, Austria
- Height: 1.83 m (6 ft 0 in)
- Position: Striker

Team information
- Current team: SV Leobendorf
- Number: 9

Youth career
- 1991–1995: SV Leobendorf
- 1991–2000: Rapid Wien
- 2000–2001: VfB Stuttgart

Senior career*
Years	Team	Apps	(Gls)
2001–2004	SW Bregenz	44	(1)
2004–2005	Kapfenberger SV	33	(8)
2005–2007	LASK	45	(13)
2007–2008	SpVgg Unterhaching	26	(8)
2008–2009	SCR Altach	33	(9)
2009–2010	Rapid Wien	15	(2)
2011–2012	SV Horn	27	(8)
2012–2014	FC Liefering	38	(18)
2014–2019	SV Leobendorf	118	(102)
2019–2022	First Vienna	53	(31)
2022–	SV Leobendorf	17	(3)
- * Club domestic league appearances and goals as of 20:14, 28 March 2023 (UTC)

Mario Konrad (born 22 January 1983) is an Austrian footballer. He plays for Austrian Regionalliga East club SV Leobendorf.

== Playing career ==
Austrian striker Konrad made his way into professional football after spells as a youth player at both hometown club SK Rapid Vienna and VFB Stuttgart. In 2001, he signed a professional contract with SC Schwarz-Weiß Bregenz, a club in Austria's regional divisions based on Lake Constance. After a successful three years in Bregenz, Konrad agreed to terms with Styrian outfit Kapfenberger SV who were at the time in the second tier of Austrian football. Another move followed just 12 months later as Konrad enjoyed a two-year stay at the much more renowned LASK Linz. A short stint in Germany with SpVgg Unterhaching ensued, before Konrad made the short trip south back to his native Austria to play for another Vorarlberg side SCR Altach.

At the start of the 2009/10 season, Konrad made a surprise move to Austria's biggest and best supported club SK Rapid Vienna, scoring his first goal for the Green & Whites against SK Austria Kärnten. Konrad struggled during his time at the Gerhard Hanappi Stadium and after having failed to convince during his 15 appearances was subsequently banished to train with the reserves. Having failed to ship him out in the close season, Rapid kept Konrad's registration throughout the 2010/2011 season, in which he failed to make an appearance. At the end of the season Konrad finally found an escape route in the shape of regional league outfit SV Horn, with whom he achieved promotion to the second tier in his first season.

Despite having enjoyed moderate success at Horn, Konrad made the surprise move to FC Liefering, a reserve side/feeder club for FC Red Bull Salzburg.
