= Willhelm Schuldes =

Austrian footballer and manager

Personal information
- Date of birth: 27 May 1968 (age 58)
- Place of birth: Austria
- Position: Forward

Team information
- Current team: SK Rapid Wien II (Sporting director)

Senior career*
Years	Team	Apps	(Gls)
–1988	Kremser SC		
1988–1991	SC Zwettl		
1991–1998	SV Horn		

Managerial career
- 2001–2003: SV Horn
- 2008–2012: Fußballakademie Linz U18
- 2013–2014: SV Horn
- * Club domestic league appearances and goals

Willhelm Schuldes (born 27 May 1968) is an Austrian football manager and former player. He is currently the Sporting director of SK Rapid Wien II
