= Peter Flicker =

Austrian footballer and manager

Personal information
- Date of birth: 14 August 1964 (age 62)
- Place of birth: Austria
- Position: Defender

Team information
- Current team: SC Columbia Floridsdorf (manager)

Senior career*
Years	Team	Apps	(Gls)
–1991	Floridsdorfer AC		
1991–1993	SV Stockerau		
1993–1999	Floridsdorfer AC	19	(2)
1999–2000	SC Leopoldsdorf/Mfd.		
2000–2001	SC Columbia Floridsdorf	3	(0)
2001–2003	FC Würnitz		
2003	FK Bockfließ		

Managerial career
- 2004: Floridsdorfer AC
- 2004–2005: Floridsdorfer AC
- 2006–2009: SK Slovan HAC
- 2009: IC Favoriten
- 2011–2012: SV Hausleiten
- 2012–2013: SC Prottes
- 2013–: SC Columbia Floridsdorf
- * Club domestic league appearances and goals

Peter Flicker (born 14 August 1964) is an Austrian football manager and former player who currently manages SC Columbia Floridsdorf.
