= Daniel Hautzinger =

Austrian footballer

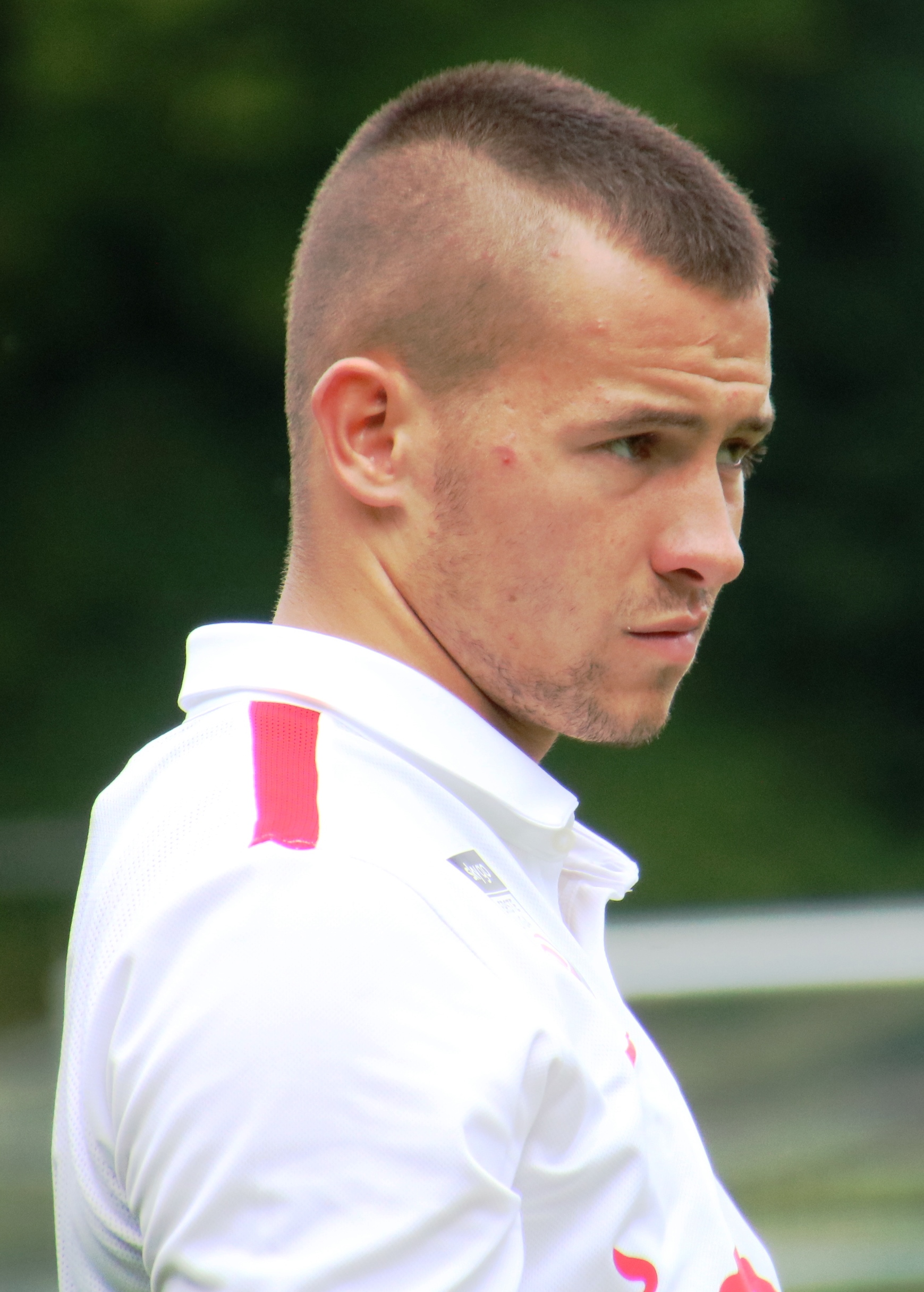
- Hautzinger with Liefering in 2017

Personal information
- Date of birth: 12 May 1998 (age 28)
- Place of birth: Hainburg an der Donau, Austria
- Height: 1.79 m (5 ft 10 1/2 in)
- Position: Midfielder

Team information
- Current team: SV Stripfing
- Number: 18

Youth career
- 2004–2010: FC Andau
- 2010–2014: Rapid Wien
- 2014–2015: Udinese

Senior career*
Years	Team	Apps	(Gls)
2015	Neusiedl am See	0	(0)
2015–2018	Liefering	3	(0)
2015–2017	→ Admira Wacker II (loan)	21	(2)
2018	→ FCM Traiskirchen (loan)	9	(0)
2018–2019	Floridsdorfer AC	12	(0)
2019–	SV Stripfing	10	(1)

International career
2013–2014	Austria U16	10	(1)
2014–2015	Austria U17	7	(1)
2015–2016	Austria U18	4	(0)
2017	Austria U19	3	(0)
- * Club domestic league appearances and goals as of 18:15, 14 October 2019 (UTC)

Daniel Hautzinger (born 12 May 1998) is an Austrian football player. He plays for SV Stripfing.

== Club career ==
He made his Austrian Football First League debut for FC Liefering on 28 July 2017 in a game against WSG Wattens.
