= Hans Kleer =

Austrian footballer and manager

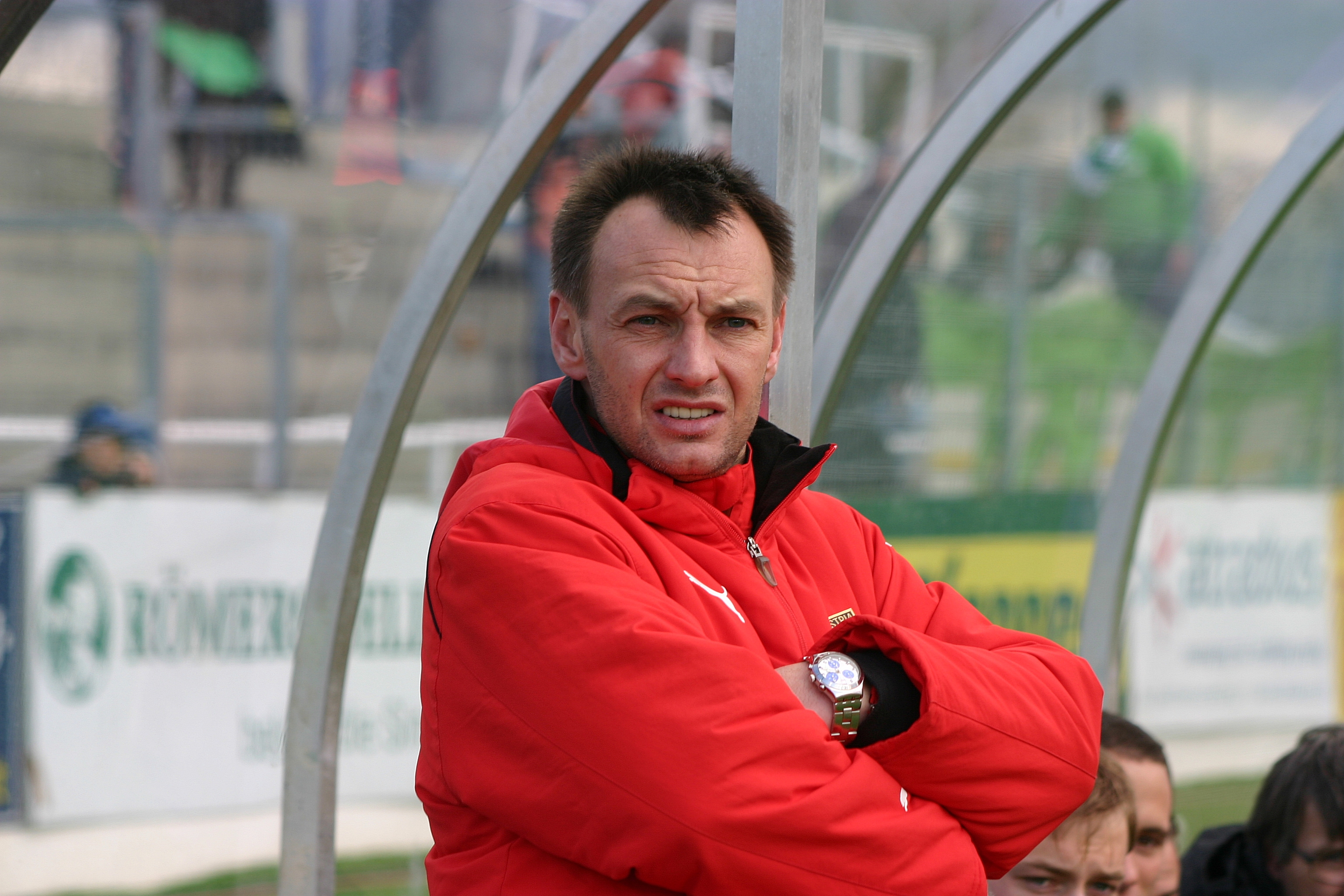

Personal information
- Date of birth: 4 September 1969 (age 57)
- Place of birth: Vienna, Austria
- Height: 1.81 m (5 ft 11 in)
- Position: Defender

Team information
- Current team: FCM Flyeralarm Traiskirchen (manager)

Senior career*
Years	Team	Apps	(Gls)
- Austria Wien
1989–1992	VfB Mödling		
1992–1995	First Vienna FC		
1995–1999	SC Austria Lustenau	93	(9)
1999–2000	SKN St. Pölten	19	(2)
2000	SV Hundsheim	6	(1)
2000–2001	1. Simmeringer SC	5	(0)
2001–2002	SV Donau		
2002	SC Zwettl	14	(3)
2002–2006	SV Donau	32	(1)
2006–2007	SV Gerasdorf/Stammersdorf		
2010–2013	CWF Amateure 99		

International career
1990–1991	Austria U21	3	(0)

Managerial career
- 2004–2005: SV Donau
- 2008–2009: Austria Lustenau
- 2009–2010: Wiener SC
- 2011: FC Tulln
- 2011–2015: Floridsdorfer AC
- 2015–2016: SV Horn
- 2016–2018: First Vienna
- 2018–2019: Karabakh Wien
- 2019–2020: SV Horn
- 2020–2022: SV Stripfing
- 2022–: FCM Flyeralarm Traiskirchen
- * Club domestic league appearances and goals

Johann "Hans" Kleer (born 4 September 1969) is an Austrian professional football manager and former player who is the manager of Austrian Regionalliga club FCM Flyeralarm Traiskirchen. He has previously managed clubs including Wiener SC, Floridsdorfer AC and Austria Lustenau.
