= Peter Leitl =

Austrian footballer and manager

Personal information
- Date of birth: 11 June 1948 (age 78)
- Place of birth: Austria
- Position: Defender

Senior career*
Years	Team	Apps	(Gls)
1970–1971	Admira Wien		
1971–1972	Wacker Wien		
1972–1976	Wr. Sportclub/Post	13	(1)

Managerial career
- 1985–1987: SR Donaufeld
- 1991–1992: First Vienna FC
- 1995: SV Horn
- * Club domestic league appearances and goals

Peter Leitl (born 11 June 1948) is an Austrian football manager and former player.
