= Florian Toplitsch =

Austrian footballer

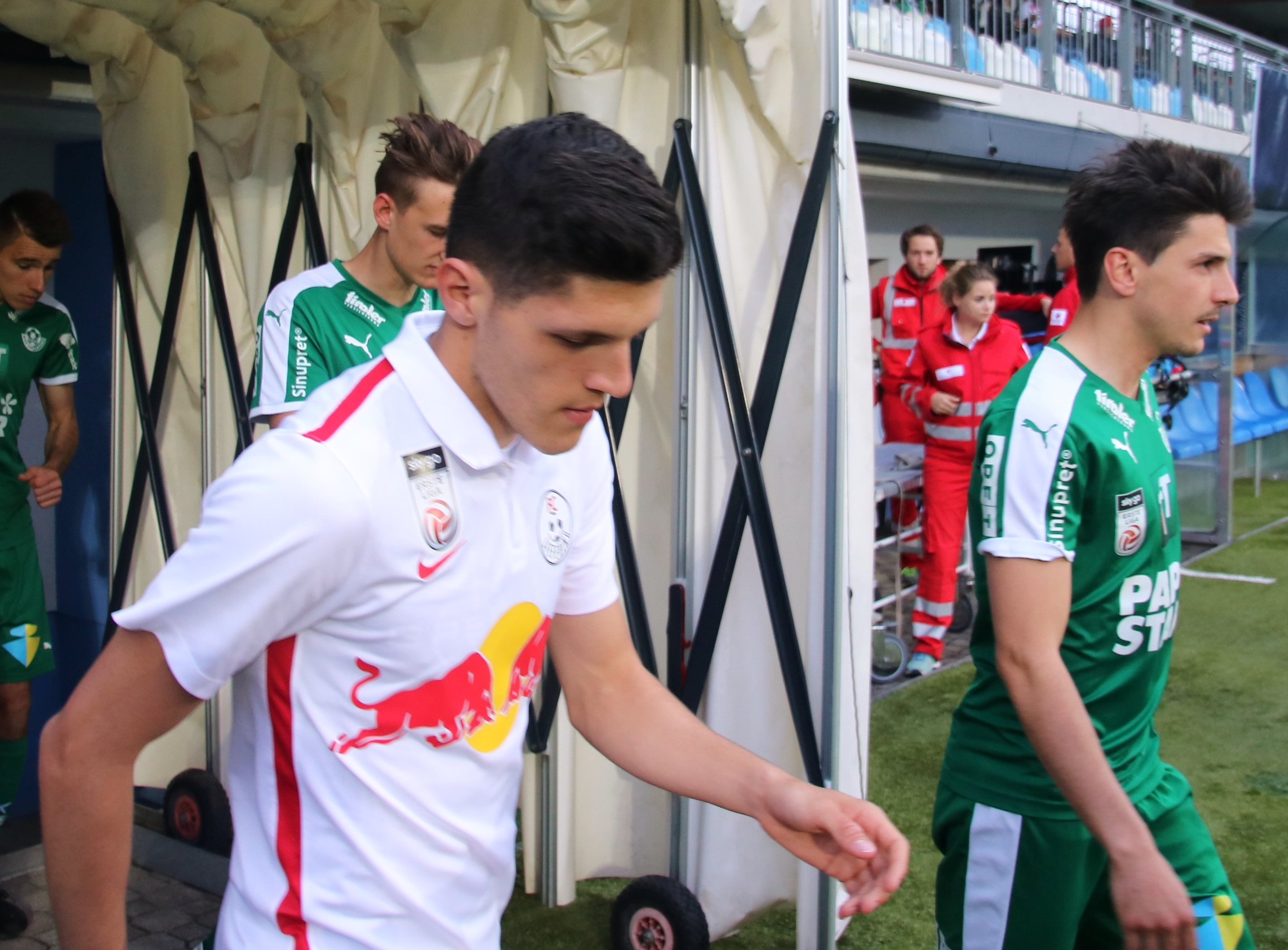
- Toplitsch (R) with WSG Wattens in 2017

Personal information
- Date of birth: 7 September 1991 (age 35)
- Height: 1.73 m (5 ft 8 in)
- Position: Midfielder

Team information
- Current team: Völser SV
- Number: 9

Youth career
- 1997–2000: SV Lohbach/Kranebitten
- 2000–2005: Wacker Tirol
- 2005–2009: AKA Tirol

Senior career*
Years	Team	Apps	(Gls)
2009–2011	Wacker Innsbruck II	64	(4)
2011–2021	WSG Swarovski Tirol	222	(12)
2021–	Völser SV	6	(0)
- * Club domestic league appearances and goals as of 5 September 2021

Florian Toplitsch (born 7 September 1991) is an Austrian football player. He plays for Völser SV.

== Club career ==
He made his Austrian Football First League debut for WSG Wattens on 12 August 2016 in a game against SC Wiener Neustadt.

In the summer of 2021, he joined Völser SV in the fourth-tier Tiroler Liga.
