= Thomas Höltschl =

Austrian footballer

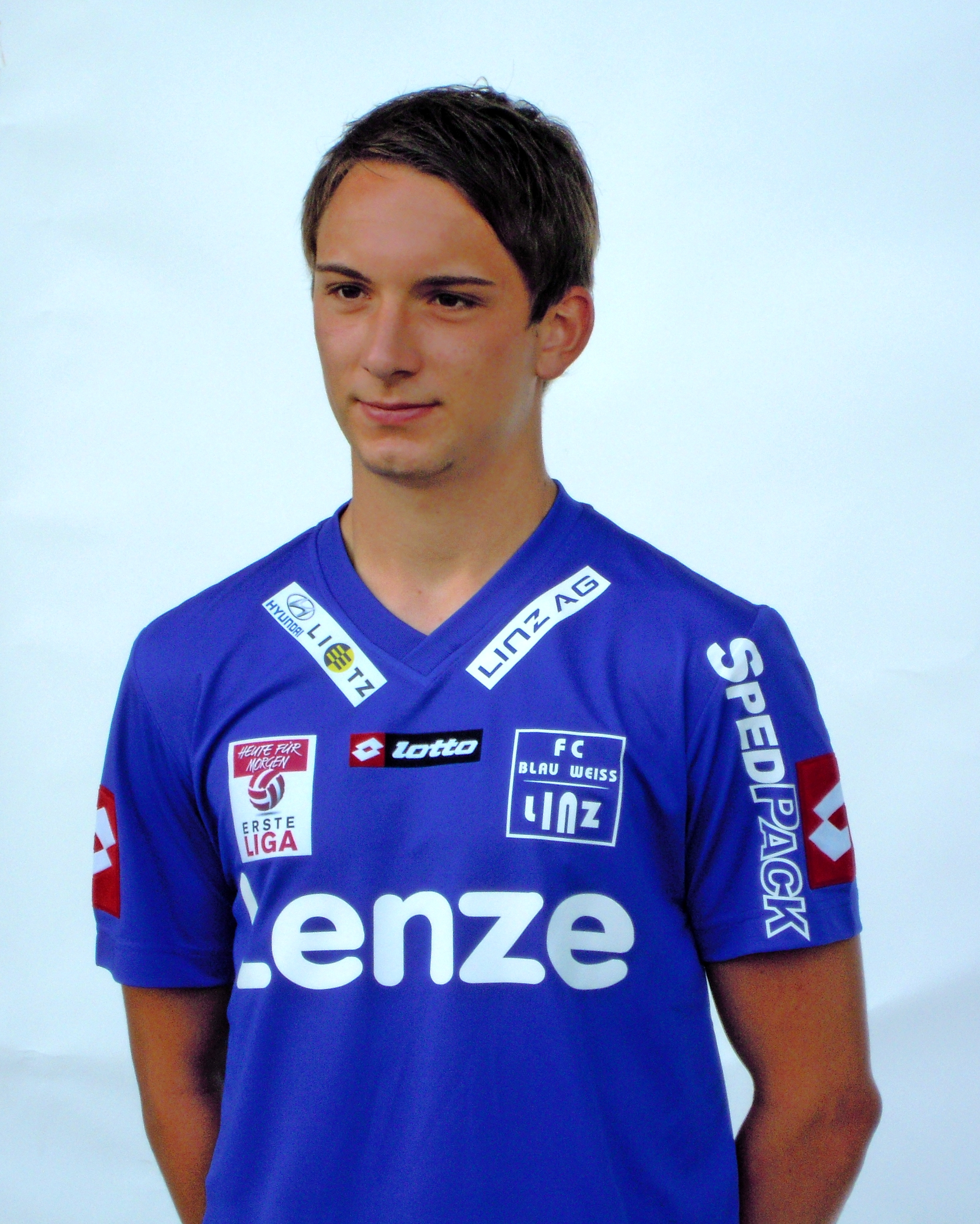
- Thomas Höltschl

Personal information
- Date of birth: 30 April 1990 (age 36)
- Place of birth: Linz, Austria
- Height: 1.84 m (6 ft 1/2 in)
- Position: Midfielder

Team information
- Current team: USK Anif
- Number: 27

Youth career
- 1996–1999: ASKÖ Blaue Elf Linz
- 1999–2008: LASK Linz

Senior career*
Years	Team	Apps	(Gls)
2006–2011	LASK Linz	11	(0)
2011–2013	FC Blau-Weiß Linz	52	(2)
2013–2014	Union St. Florian	28	(7)
2014–2015	TSV Neumarkt	14	(0)
2015–2019	Union Vöcklamarkt	108	(21)
2019–	USK Anif	5	(2)
- * Club domestic league appearances and goals as of 25 October 2019

Thomas Höltschl (born 30 April 1990) is an Austrian football midfielder who currently plays for USK Anif.
