= Patrik Eler =

Slovenian footballer

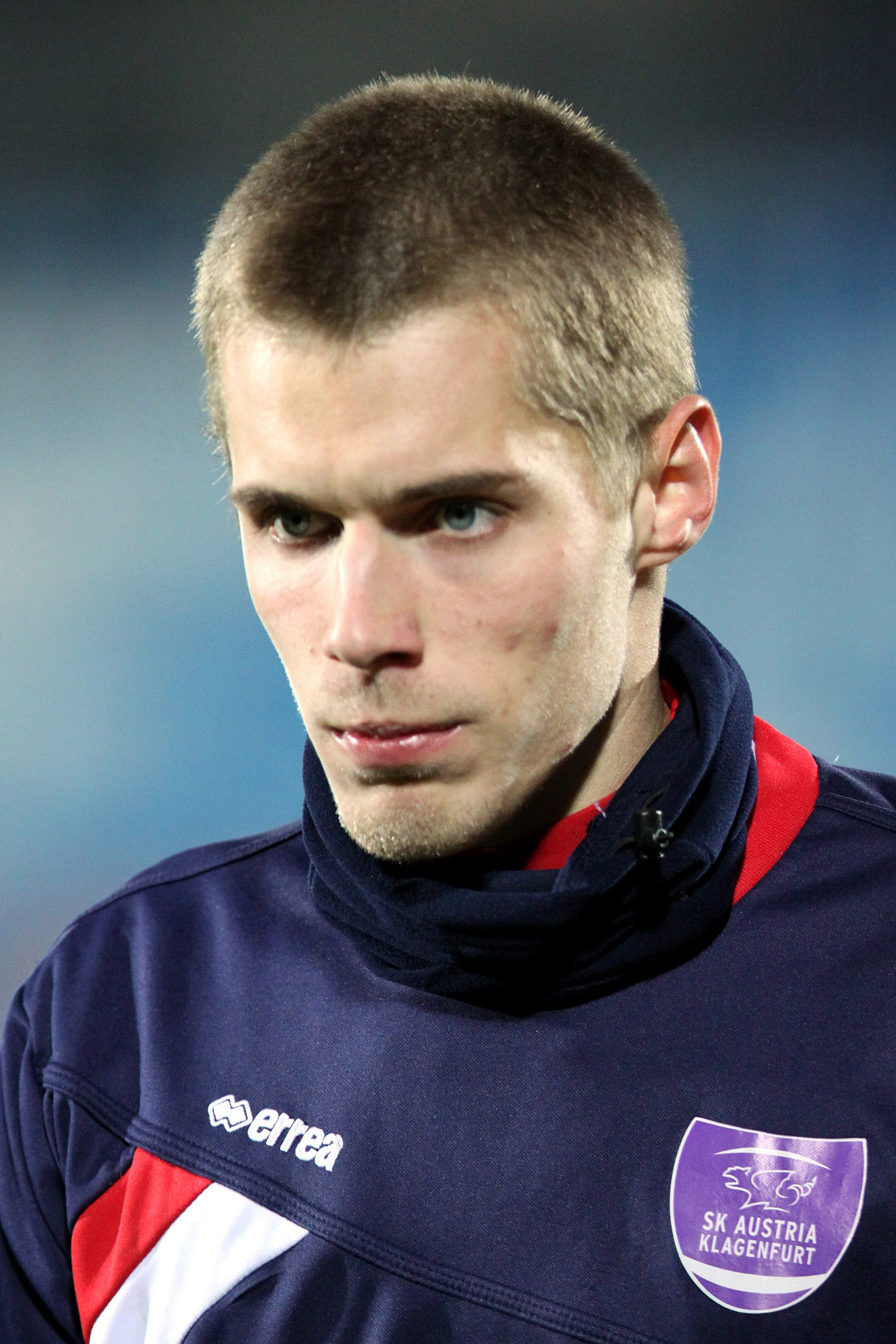
- Eler with Austria Klagenfurt in 2015

Personal information
- Date of birth: 13 June 1991 (age 35)
- Place of birth: Šempeter pri Gorici, SFR Yugoslavia
- Height: 1.85 m (6 ft 1 in)
- Position: Forward

Team information
- Current team: Adria

Youth career
- Vodice Šempas
- Gorica
- Bilje
- Renče

Senior career*
Years	Team	Apps	(Gls)
2010–2013	Adria		
2013–2016	Austria Klagenfurt	75	(43)
2016–2017	Wacker Innsbruck	32	(24)
2017–2019	Nancy	8	(1)
2017–2018	→ Nancy II	5	(2)
2018	→ Wacker Innsbruck (loan)	13	(0)
2019	→ SV Ried (loan)	13	(8)
2019–2020	Austria Lustenau	7	(1)
2020–2021	SV Horn	20	(6)
2021–2022	SV Stripfing	20	(10)
2022–	Adria	27	(23)
- * Club domestic league appearances and goals as of 13 October 2023

Patrik Eler (born 13 June 1991) is a Slovenian professional footballer who plays as a forward for Adria.

== Career ==
On 3 September 2020, Eler signed with SV Horn.

In July 2021, he joined Austrian Regionalliga East club SV Stripfing.
