= Hamayoshi Masanori =

Japanese football manager (born 1971)

Hamayoshi Masanori 濱吉 正則
Personal information
- Date of birth: 5 July 1971 (age 55)
- Place of birth: Hyōgo Prefecture, Japan

Managerial career
- Years: Team
- 1995–1998: FC Jezica
- 1998–1999: FC HIT Gorica (youth)
- 2000–2003: Kashiwa Reysol Youth
- 2003–2004: Nagoya Grampus (assistant)
- 2004–2006: Nagoya Grampus (youth)
- 2009–2011: Tokushima Vortis
- 2011–2012: Giravanz Kitakyushu (assistant)
- 2013–2014: Omiya Ardija (interpreter)
- 2016–2017: SV Horn

Hamayoshi Masanori (born 5 July 1971) is a Japanese football manager who last was the manager of SV Horn.
