= Stephan Bürgler =

Austrian footballer

Personal information
- Date of birth: November 21, 1987 (age 38)
- Place of birth: Klagenfurt, Austria
- Height: 1.86 m (6 ft 1 in)
- Position: Forward

Team information
- Current team: SAK Klagenfurt
- Number: 22

Senior career*
Years	Team	Apps	(Gls)
2006–?	SK Austria Kärnten	13	(0)
2006–2007	-> ASKÖ Köttmansdorf (loan)	?	(?)
2017–	SAK Klagenfurt	?	(?)
- * Club domestic league appearances and goals

Stephan Bürgler (born 21 November 1987 in Klagenfurt) is an Austrian football player who currently plays for SK Austria Kärnten. He formerly played for FC Kärnten and on loan at ASKÖ Köttmansdorf.
