= Ignacio Jaúregui =

Argentine footballer (born 1995)

Personal information
- Date of birth: 2 August 1995 (age 31)
- Place of birth: Mercedes, Argentina
- Height: 1.74 m (5 ft 9 in)
- Position: Attacking midfielder

Team information
- Current team: SVG Reichenau
- Number: 5

Senior career*
Years	Team	Apps	(Gls)
2013–2017	Gimnasia y Esgrima	2	(0)
2016	→ Estudiantes (loan)	11	(0)
2017–2018	Ferro General Pico	15	(0)
2018–2021	WSG Wattens	27	(4)
2021–2022	Linense	21	(0)
2022	→ Saguntino (loan)	4	(0)
2022–2023	FC Dornbirn	4	(0)
2023–2025	FC Kufstein	35	(3)
2025–	SVG Reichenau	8	(0)

International career
2014	Argentina U20		
- * Club domestic league appearances and goals as of 27 June 2026

Ignacio Jaúregui (born 2 August 1995) is an Argentine footballer who plays as an attacking midfielder for Austrian Regionalliga West club SVG Reichenau.

== Club career ==
Jaúregui made his professional debut for then-Primera B Nacional team Gimnasia y Esgrima in 2013, he was subbed on for Maximiliano Meza in a 3–0 home victory over Sarmiento on 15 June in a season which ended with promotion. Another appearance followed in September 2014 against Defensa y Justicia, prior to Jaúregui departing Gimnasia y Esgrima on loan to sign for Estudiantes in Primera B Nacional. He remained with Estudiantes for two seasons and made a total of twelve appearances. On 24 August 2017, Jaúregui joined Torneo Federal A side Ferro Carril Oeste. His debut arrived on 30 September away to Sansinena.

Austrian Football Second League club WSG Wattens signed Jaúregui in June 2018. He scored on his league debut, netting the third of a 6–1 home win versus SV Lafnitz on 28 July; having notched a goal a week previous in the Austrian Cup against USK Anif. In January 2019, after four goals in fifteen appearances, Jaúregui signed a contract extension with the club until 2021. They won promotion as champions to the Bundesliga at the end of 2018–19. He didn't make an appearance across the following eighteen months due to injuries.

On 6 June 2021, he joined Linense in Spain on a three-year contract.

Jaúregui joined Austrian Second League club FC Dornbirn on 9 June 2022.

== International career ==
In June 2014, Jaúregui was selected to train with the Argentina national football team ahead of the 2014 FIFA World Cup in Brazil. He also played for the Argentina U20s.

== Career statistics ==
As of 17 December 2020.

Club statistics
Club	Season	League			Cup		Continental		Other		Total	
Club	Season	Division	Apps	Goals	Apps	Goals	Apps	Goals	Apps	Goals	Apps	Goals
Gimnasia y Esgrima	2012–13	Primera B Nacional	1	0	0	0	—		0	0	1	0
Gimnasia y Esgrima	2013–14	Primera División	0	0	0	0	—		0	0	0	0
Gimnasia y Esgrima	2014	Primera División	1	0	0	0	0	0	0	0	1	0
Gimnasia y Esgrima	2015	Primera División	0	0	0	0	—		0	0	0	0
Gimnasia y Esgrima	2016	Primera División	0	0	0	0	—		0	0	0	0
Gimnasia y Esgrima	2016–17	Primera División	0	0	0	0	0	0	0	0	0	0
Gimnasia y Esgrima	Total		2	0	0	0	0	0	0	0	2	0
Estudiantes (loan)	2016	Primera B Nacional	2	0	0	0	—		0	0	2	0
Estudiantes (loan)	2016–17	Primera B Nacional	9	0	1	0	—		0	0	10	0
Estudiantes (loan)	Total		11	0	1	0	—		0	0	12	0
Ferro Carril Oeste	2017–18	Torneo Federal A	15	0	0	0	—		2 (Note: Appearance(s) in the Torneo Federal A play-offs)	0	17	0
WSG Wattens	2018–19	Second League	27	4	2	1	—		0	0	29	5
WSG Wattens	2019–20	Bundesliga	0	0	0	0	—		0	0	0	0
WSG Wattens	2020–21	Bundesliga	0	0	0	0	—		0	0	0	0
WSG Wattens	Total		27	4	2	1	—		0	0	29	5
Career total			55	4	3	1	0	0	2	0	60	5

== Honours ==
WSG Wattens

- Second League: 2018–19
