= Rudolf Eggenberger =

Austrian football manager

Personal information
- Date of birth: 5 March 1946 (age 80)
- Place of birth: Austria

Managerial career
- Years: Team
- 1985–1986: Wiener Sport-Club
- 1986–1987: Wiener Sport-Club
- 1990–1992: SR Donaufeld
- 1992–1997: First Vienna FC
- 1998: SK Vorwärts Steyr
- 1999–2000: SC Eisenstadt
- 2001–2004: Floridsdorfer AC

Rudolf Eggenberger (born 5 March 1946) is an Austrian football manager.
