= Stefan Hager =

Austrian footballer

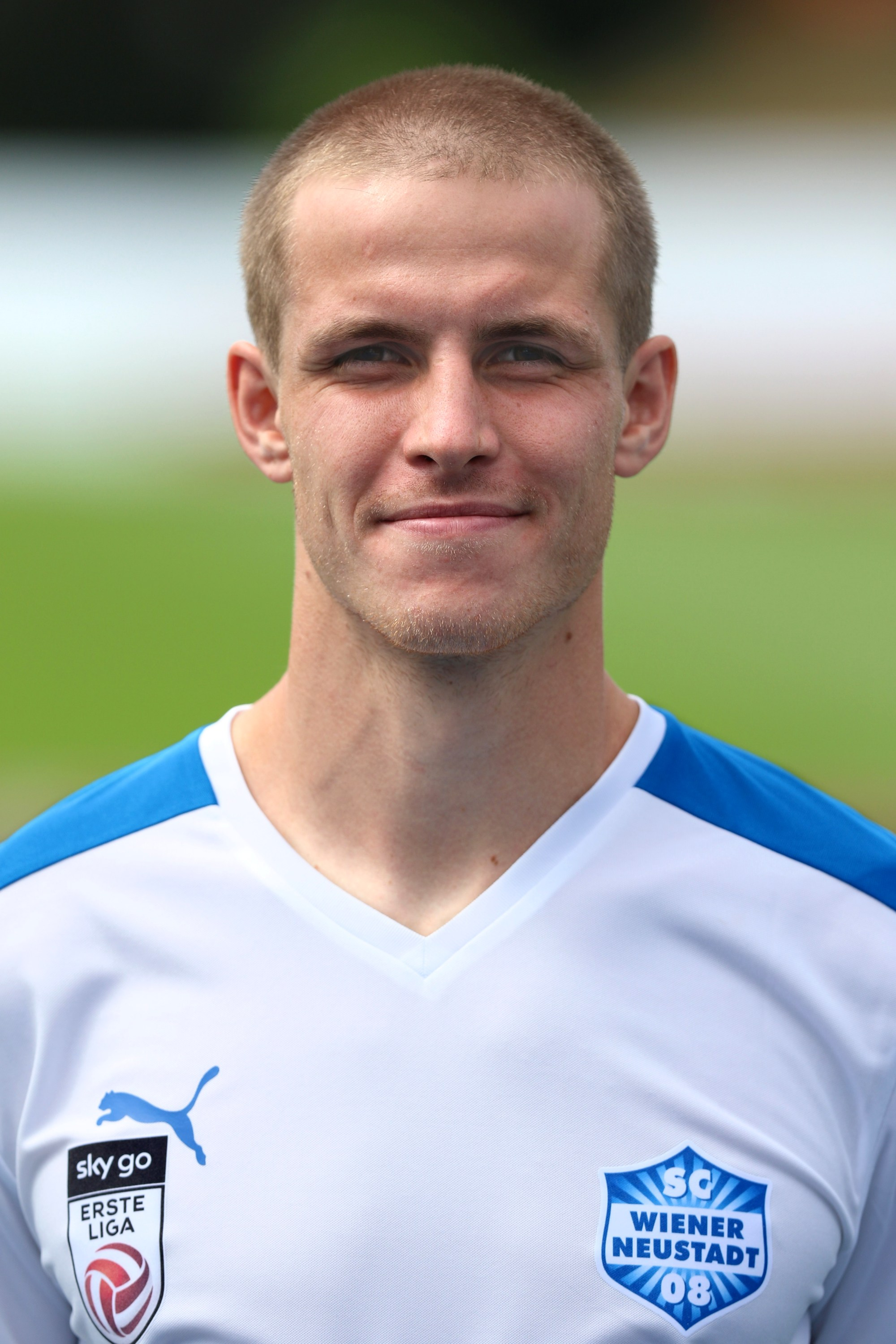

Personal information
- Date of birth: 25 January 1995 (age 31)
- Place of birth: Austria
- Height: 1.87 m (6 ft 2 in)
- Position: Centre back

Team information
- Current team: SC Schwaz
- Number: 3

Youth career
- 2002–2003: Innsbrucker SK
- 2003–2007: FC Zirl
- 2007–2008: FC Wacker Innsbruck
- 2008–2009: Innsbrucker AC
- 2009–2011: AKA Tirol
- 2011–2014: Bayern Munich

Senior career*
Years	Team	Apps	(Gls)
2014–2017	LASK Linz II	47	(6)
2015–2017	LASK Linz	3	(0)
2016–2017	→ Wiener Neustadt (loan)	19	(0)
2017–2019	Wiener Neustadt	59	(6)
2019–2021	WSG Wattens	42	(2)
2021–2022	Wacker Innsbruck	13	(0)
2022–2024	Kufstein	57	(11)
2024–	SC Schwaz	50	(4)

International career
2010	Austria U16	3	(0)
2011	Austria U17	6	(0)
2012	Austria U18	1	(0)
- * Club domestic league appearances and goals as of 27 June 2026

Stefan Hager (born 25 January 1995) is an Austrian footballer who plays for Austrian Regionalliga West club SC Schwaz.

== Career ==
=== WSG Tirol ===
On 12 June 2019, Hager joined WSG Swarovski Tirol on a three-year contract.

=== Wacker Innsbruck ===
On 22 July 2021, he signed a one-year contract with Wacker Innsbruck.
