= Franz Maresch =

Austrian footballer and manager

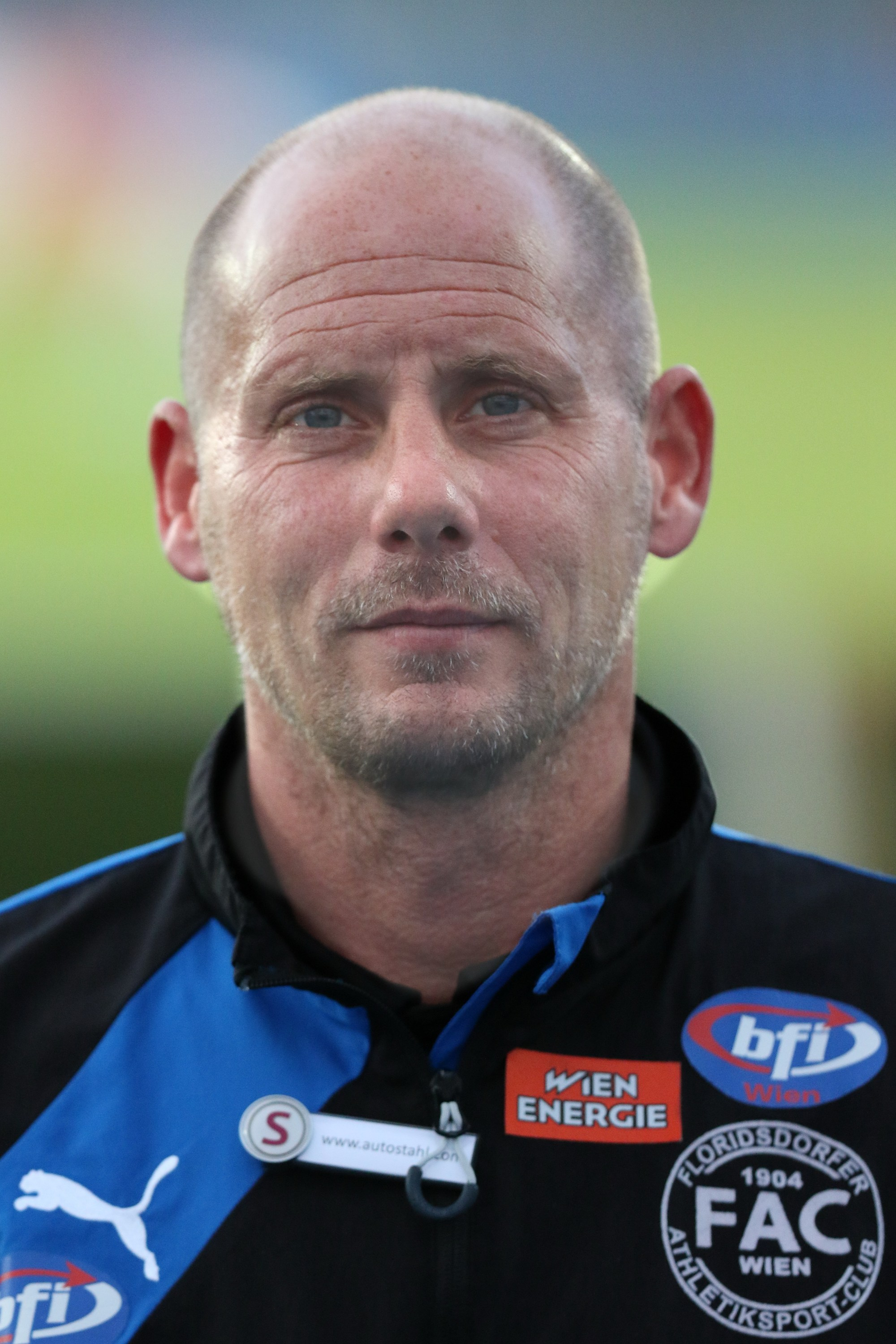
- Maresch in 2017

Personal information
- Date of birth: 28 June 1972 (age 54)
- Place of birth: Vienna, Austria
- Height: 1.80 m (5 ft 11 in)
- Position: Forward

Senior career*
Years	Team	Apps	(Gls)
1990–1991	Austria Wien	1	(0)
1991–1992	FC Stadlau		
1992	SC Zwettl		
1992–1993	First Vienna FC	4	(1)
1993–1995	FC Stadlau		
1995	SC Untersiebenbrunn		
1995–1996	ASK Kottingbrunn		
1996–1998	SC Untersiebenbrunn		
1998–2000	SC Zwettl		
2000–2002	ASK Baumgarten	55	(19)
2002	First Vienna FC	12	(2)
2002–2003	SV Langenrohr	26	(5)
2003–2004	SC Himberg	10	(3)
2004–2005	Donau Wien		
2005–2007	Columbia Floridsdorf		

Managerial career
- 2007–2011: Columbia Floridsdorf
- 2011–2012: Wiener Sport-Club
- 2013: WAF Brigittenau
- 2016–2017: 1. Simmeringer SC
- 2017: Floridsdorfer AC
- * Club domestic league appearances and goals

Franz Maresch (born 28 June 1972) is an Austrian football manager and former player. He is currently contracted to Sportklub Rapid Vienna.
