= Mareš =

Mareš (feminine: Marešová) is a Czech surname. It is derived from the given names Martin and Marek. A Germanised version of the surname is Maresch. Notable people with the surname include:

- Anna Marešová (born 1946), Czech rower
- Dominik Mareš (born 2003), Czech footballer
- František Mareš (1857–1942), Czech physiologist, philosopher and politician
- Jakub Mareš (born 1987), Czech footballer
- Jaroslav Mareš (1937–2021), Czech biologist, traveller and writer
- Josef Mareš (born 1964), Czech screenwriter and police officer
- Kateřina Marešová (born 1984), Czech gymnast
- Leoš Mareš (born 1976), Czech television personality and singer
- Martin Mareš (born 1982), Czech cyclist
- Michal Mareš (born 1976), Czech futsal player
- Oldřiška Marešová (born 1986), Czech athlete
- Pavel Mareš (born 1976), Czech footballer
- Petr Mareš (born 1991), Czech footballer
- Roman Mareš (born 1975), Czech futsal player
- Vojtěch Mareš (1936–2025), Czech handball player and coach
