= SV Horn =

Association football club in Austria

- Full name: Sportverein Horn
- Founded: 21 October 1922; 103 years ago
- Ground: Sparkasse Horn Arena
- Capacity: 3,500
- Chairman: Markus Reichenvater
- Manager: Stefan Hirczy
- League: Regionalliga East
- 2025–26: Regionalliga East, 6th of 17
- Website: www.svhorn.at
Home colours	Away colours

Sportverein Horn is a football club based in the city of Horn, Austria, which competes in the Austrian Regionalliga East, one of the third tiers of Austrian football.

Founded in 1922, SV Horn won the Landesliga Niederösterreich title in 1991, 1998, and 2007. In 2008, the club claimed the Austrian Cup by defeating SV Feldkirchen in the final, although clubs from the Austrian Football Bundesliga and the Second Division did not participate in that edition of the competition. SV Horn subsequently contested the unofficial Austrian Supercup in 2008, where they were defeated 7–1 by Rapid Wien.

On 8 June 2015, Japanese international Keisuke Honda's management company, Honda ESTILO—run by his brothers Hiroyuki and Youji—acquired a 49% stake in the club. In 2018, the investment group sold its shares, returning the club to local ownership.

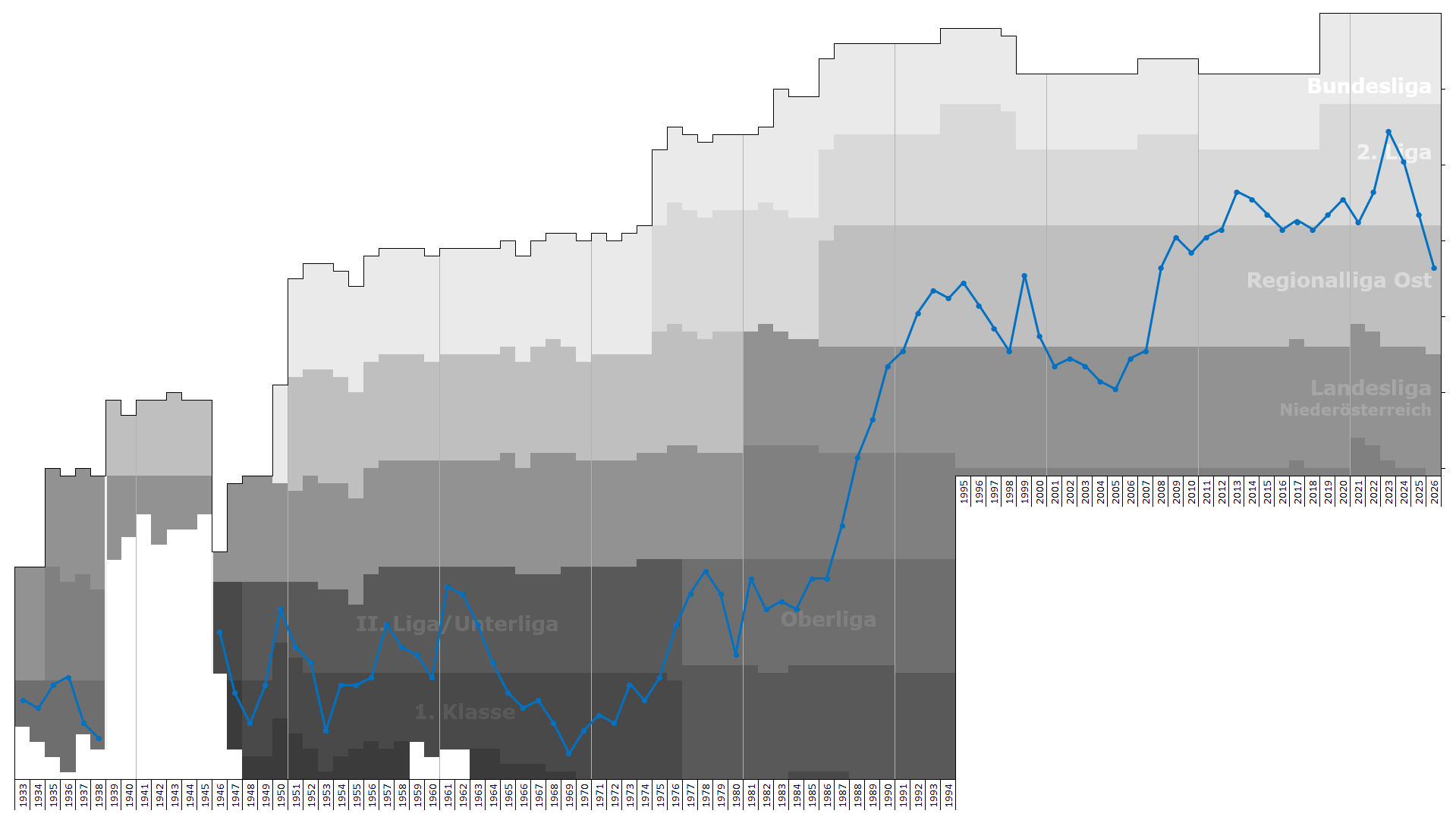
Historical chart of SV Horn league performance

== Honours ==
- Austrian Cup
  - Winners (1): 2007–08

== Current squad ==
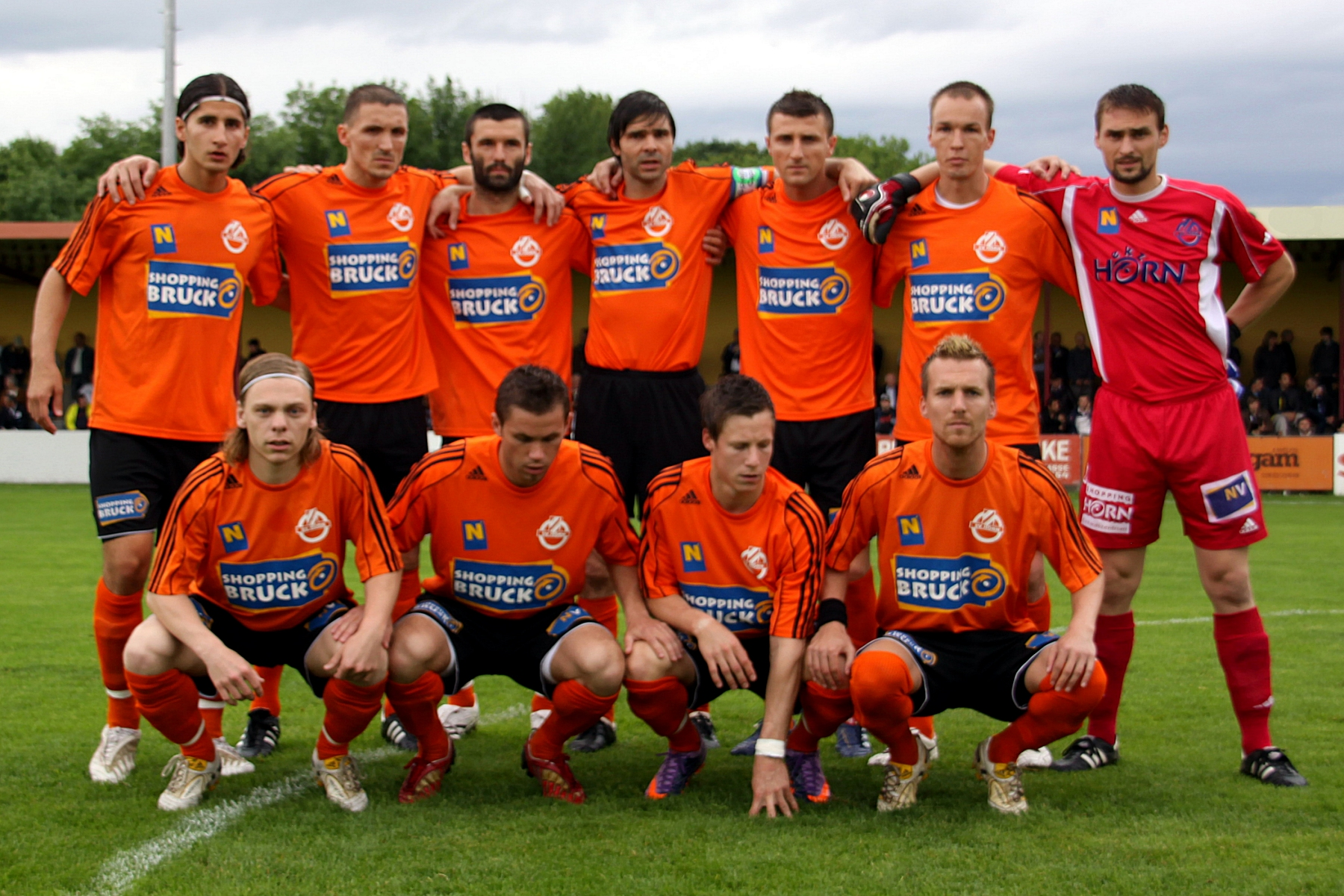
Team lineup (May 2010)

As of 2 February 2026

Note: Flags indicate national team as defined under FIFA eligibility rules; some limited exceptions apply. Players may hold more than one non-FIFA nationality.

No.	Pos.	Nation	Player
1	GK	AUT	Can Beliktay
3	DF	GER	Seedy Jarju
4	DF	SVN	Nik Trcek
7	FW	AUT	David Budimir
8	MF	AUT	Kürsat Güclü
9	FW	SRB	Zoran Mihailović
10	MF	GER	Karim Dhouib
11	FW	GRE	Nikolaos Kokkas
13	GK	SVK	Matej Vajs
14	FW	SVK	Viktor Vondryska

No.	Pos.	Nation	Player
17	MF	AUT	Raphael Bauer
19	FW	ESP	Isa Drammeh
20	DF	AUT	Julian Hinterleitner
21	MF	AUT	Joel Kitenge (on loan from First Vienna)
22	MF	AUT	Simon Widor
23	DF	GER	Alexander Mankowski
26	DF	AUT	Dominik Buranich
27	DF	SVK	Patrik Šurnovský
29	GK	POL	Alexander Michalak

=== Out on loan ===
Note: Flags indicate national team as defined under FIFA eligibility rules; some limited exceptions apply. Players may hold more than one non-FIFA nationality.

No. / Pos. / Nation / Player; — / MF / AUT / Raphael Bauer (at Zwettl until 30 June 2025)	No. / Pos. / Nation / Player; — / MF / AUT / Filip Stojak (at TWL Elektra until 30 June 2025)

== Managerial history ==
As of 29 May 2025

From 1990 onwards

- (Slovakia) Anton Dragúň (1990–1994)
- (Austria) Karl Daxbacher (1994–1995)
- (Austria) Peter Leitl (1995)
- (Slovakia) Andreas Singer (1995–1999)
- (Austria) Willhelm Schuldes (1999–2003)
- (Austria) Reinhard Schendlinger (2003–2004)
- (Czech Republic) Bohumil Smrček (2004)
- (Austria) Attila Sekerlioglu (2005)
- (Austria) Rupert Marko (2005–2010)
- (Austria) Michael Streiter (2010–2013)
- (Austria) Willhelm Schuldes (2013–2014)
- (Austria) Christoph Westerthaler (2014–2015)
- (Austria) Hans Kleer (2015–2016)
- (Austria) Christoph Westerthaler (2016)
- (Japan) Hamayoshi Masanori (2016–2017)
- (Germany) Carsten Jancker (2017–2018)
- (Japan) Hamayoshi Masanori (2017–2019)
- (Austria) Hans Kleer (2019–2020)
- (Russia) Aleksandr Borodyuk (2020)
- (Bulgaria) Genadi Petrov (2020)
- (Croatia) Davod Mladina (2020)
- (Bulgaria) Genadi Petrov (2020)
- (Austria) Alexander Schriebl (2020–2021)
- (Austria) Rolf Landerl (2021–2022)
- (Austria) Philipp Riederer (2022–2024)
- (Austria) Thomas Janeschitz (2024–2025)
- (Austria) Andreas Lipa (2025–present)
