= Floridsdorfer AC =

- Full name: Floridsdorfer Athletiksport-Club
- Founded: 1904; 122 years ago
- Ground: FAC-Platz
- Capacity: 3,000
- Chairman: Walter Brand
- Manager: Mario Sonnleitner
- League: 2. Liga
- 2025–26: 2. Liga, 4th of 16
- Website: https://fac.at/
Home colours	Away colours

The Floridsdorfer Athletics Sports Club or simply Floridsdorfer AC or FAC is a professional football club based in Floridsdorf, the 21st district of Vienna. The club was founded in August 1904. Floridsdorfer AC won the Austrian football championship in 1918 and are currently playing in the Austrian 2. Liga, the second tier of Austrian football. The club colours are blue and white.

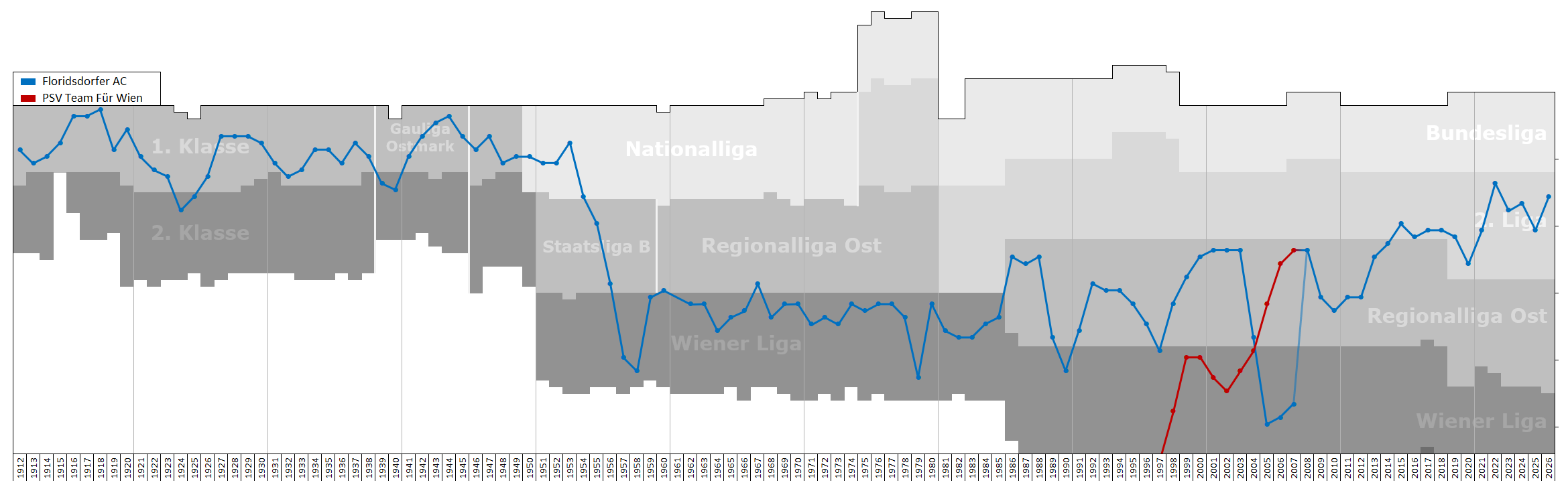
Historical chart of Floridsdorfer AC league performance

== Current squad ==
As of 13 April, 2026

Note: Flags indicate national team as defined under FIFA eligibility rules; some limited exceptions apply. Players may hold more than one non-FIFA nationality.

No.	Pos.	Nation	Player
1	GK	AUT	Juri Kirchmayr (on loan from Grazer AK)
4	DF	AUT	Josef Taieb
5	DF	AUT	Simon Filipovic
6	MF	AUT	Noah Bitsche
7	DF	AUT	Nico Six
8	MF	AUT	Tristan Osmani
9	FW	CRO	Tomislav Glavan
10	MF	SLO	Lan Piskule
11	FW	AUT	Tobias Lerchbacher
13	MF	CPV	Flavio
16	MF	AUT	Fabian Hafenscher
17	FW	AUT	Moritz Neumann
18	DF	AUT	Marcus Maier

No.	Pos.	Nation	Player
19	DF	AUT	Mirnes Becirovic
20	MF	AUT	Niklas Schneider
21	FW	AUT	Alex Sobczyk
22	MF	AUT	Lukas Gabbichler
24	DF	AUT	Marco Untergrabner
30	DF	AUT	Edin Huskovic
33	GK	AUT	Philipp Bauer
34	FW	AUT	Joel Richards
35	DF	AUT	Senol Hasanoski
36	MF	AUT	Armin Domuzeti
37	FW	AUT	Ernad Kupinic
38	MF	AUT	Zareh Kaynak
41	GK	AUT	Florian Bachmann

== Honours ==
- Austrian Championship (1): 1917–18

== List of managers ==
As of 17 November 2022

From 1930 onwards

- (Austria) Richard Ziegler / Karl Schrott (1930–1931)
- (Austria) Karl Jiszda (1931–1934)
- (Austria) Ferdinand Humenberger (1935)
- (Austria) Rudolf Seidl (1935–1940)
- (Austria) Eduard Frühwirth (1939–1947)
- (Austria) Anton Artes (1947–1948)
- (Austria) Karl Durspekt (1948)
- (Austria) Anton Artes (1949–19??)
- Unknown (1949–1982)
- (Austria) Rudolf Sabetzer (1982–1983)
- (Austria) Leopold Grausam (1984–1985)
- Unknown (1985–1992)
- (Austria) Gustav Thaler (1992–1995)
- (Austria) Walter Dannhauser (1995)
- (Austria) Friedrich Täubler (1995)
- (Austria) Helmut Senekowitsch (1995–1996)
- (Austria) Gustav Thaler (1996–1997)
- (Austria) Christian Keglevits (1997–2000)
- (Austria) Erich Obermayer (2000–2001)
- (Austria) Andreas Reisinger (2001)
- (Austria) Rudolf Eggenberger (2001–2004)
- (Austria) Peter Flicker (2004)
- (Austria) Karl Berger (2004)
- (Austria) Peter Flicker (2004–2005)
- (Austria) Werner Gössinger (2006–2007)
- (Austria) Damir Canadi (2007–2008)
- (Austria) Dominik Thalhammer (2008)
- (Austria) Peter Seher (2008)
- (Austria) Andreas Ogris (2008–2010)
- (Austria) Damir Canadi (2010)
- (Austria) Christian Prosenik (2011)
- (Austria) Hans Kleer (2011–2015)
- (Austria) Peter Pacult (2015)
- (Austria) Thomas Flögel (2015)
- (Austria) Felix Gasselich (2015–2016)
- (Austria) Jürgen Halper (2016)
- (Austria) Franz Maresch (2017)
- (Austria) Dominik Glawogger (2017)
- (Austria) Thomas Eidler (2017–2018)
- (Austria) Mario Handl (2018)
- (Austria) Oliver Oberhammer (2018)
- (Austria) Andreas Heraf (2018–2019)
- (Austria) Mario Handl (2019–2020)
- (Austria) Lukas Fischer / (Bulgaria) Aleksandar Gitsov (2020)
- (Austria) (Bosnia and Herzegovina) Miron Muslić (2020)
- (Austria) Roman Ellensohn (2021)
- (Slovenia) Mitja Mörec / (Bulgaria) Aleksandar Gitsov (2021)
- (Slovenia) Mitja Mörec (2021–2025)
- (Austria) Sinan Bytyqi (2025–2026)
