= 2024–25 FK Austria Wien season =

FK Austria Wien
2024–25 season
- Manager: Stephan Helm
- Stadium: Franz Horr Stadium
- Austrian Football Bundesliga: 3rd
- Austrian Cup: Semi-finals
- UEFA Conference League: Second qualifying round
- Top goalscorer: League: Dominik Fitz (12); All: Dominik Fitz (13)
- Biggest win: FC Pinzgau Saalfelden 0–6 Austria Wien

The 2024–25 season was the 114th season in the history of FK Austria Wien, and the club's 80th consecutive season in the Austrian Football Bundesliga. In addition to the domestic league, the team participated in the Austrian Cup and the UEFA Conference League.

== Transfers ==
=== In ===
Pos.	Player	Transferred from	Fee	Date	Source
FW	(Germany) Maurice Malone	(Switzerland) Basel	Loan	22 June 2024	
FW	(Brazil) Cristiano	(Brazil) São Bento	Loan	25 June 2024	
MF	(The Gambia) Abubakr Barry	(Israel) Bnei Yehuda	Undisclosed	29 June 2024	
DF	(Sweden) Matteo Pérez Vinlöf	(Germany) Bayern Munich II	Loan	12 July 2024	
FW	(Slovenia) Nik Prelec	(Italy) Cagliari	Loan	12 July 2024	
DF	(Austria) Aleksandar Dragović	(Serbia) Red Star Belgrade	Free	30 July 2024	
FW	(Ivory Coast) Abdoulaye Kanté	(Ivory Coast) RC Abidjan	Undisclosed	2 August 2024	
DF	(Austria) Matteo Schablas	(Austria) FC Liefering	Undisclosed	31 January 2025	

=== Out ===
Pos.	Player	Transferred to	Fee	Date	Source
MF	(Australia) James Holland		Released	4 June 2024	
MF	(Austria) Matthias Braunöder	(Italy) Como	€1.5m	14 June 2024	
FW	(Israel) Silva Kani	(Israel) Beitar Jerusalem	Undisclosed	21 June 2024	
MF	(Turkey) Enis Safin	(Austria) FC Juniors OÖ	Undisclosed	26 June 2024	
FW	(Austria) Can Keleş	(Turkey) Karagümrük	€1.3m	1 July 2024	
GK	(Germany) Christian Früchtl	(Italy) Lecce	€1m	1 July 2024	
DF	(Austria) Leonardo Ivkić	(Austria) Wiener SC	Undisclosed	1 July 2024	
FW	(Nigeria) David Ewemade	(Austria) SV Stripfing	Loan	2 July 2024	
GK	(Austria) Kenan Jusic	(Austria) SV Stripfing	Loan	2 July 2024	
MF	(Somalia) Osman Abdi	(Austria) SV Stripfing	Loan	2 July 2024	
MF	(Austria) Manuel Polster	(Switzerland) FC Lausanne-Sport	Undisclosed	3 July 2024	
FW	(Austria) Alexander Schmidt	(Austria) Blau-Weiß Linz	Free	5 July 2024	
FW	(Austria) Daniel Au Yeong	SC Austria Lustenau	Undisclosed	8 July 2024	
MF	(Austria) Denis Dizdarevic	(Austria) SV Lafnitz	Undisclosed	15 July 2024	
FW	(Austria) Rocco Sutterlüty	(Austria) SV Stripfing	Loan	18 July 2024	
FW	(Austria) Romeo Vučić	(Austria) Grazer AK	Loan	19 July 2024	
DF	(Serbia) Aleksa Ilic	(Austria) SV Stripfing	Loan	19 July 2024	
MF	(Austria) Timo Schmelzer	(Austria) SC/ESV Parndorf	Undisclosed	1 January 2025	
DF	(Luxembourg) Marvin Martins	(Netherlands) Almere City	Undisclosed	4 January 2025	
GK	(Austria) Sandali Condé	(Austria) Admira Wacker	Free	17 January 2025	
FW	(Austria) Muharem Husković	(Austria) TSV Hartberg	Loan	20 January 2025	
DF	(Austria) Tobias Polz	(Austria) Union Mauer	Loan	24 January 2025	
DF	(Austria) Matteo Meisl	(Austria) SV Stripfing	Loan	28 January 2025	
DF	(Austria) Florian Kopp	(Austria) FC Wacker Innsbruck	Free	30 January 2025	
DF	(Austria) Matteo Schablas	(Austria) SV Stripfing	Loan	1 February 2025	

== Friendlies ==
29 June 2024 Friendly	Austria Wien	0–0	DAC Dunajská Streda	Vienna
17:00				Stadium: Generali Arena

3 July 2024 Friendly	Austria Wien	3–1	Sepsi OSK	Bad Tatzmannsdorf
17:00	Barry 12'; Malone 35'; Husković 51'		Breij 7'	Stadium: Sportplatz Bad Tatzmannsdorf

6 July 2024 Friendly	Austria Wien	1–3	Paksi FC	Dietersdorf
15:30	Plavotić 57'	Report	Haraszti 38', 41'; Szekszárdi 91'	Stadium: Waldstadion Dietersdorf; Referee: Sambill
Note: 2 x 60 minutes

10 July 2024 Friendly	Austria Wien	3–7	Bohemians 1905	Vienna, Austria
11:00	Fitz 21' (pen.); Fischer 22'; Malone 28'		Helal 2', 26', 52'; Ristovski 36'; Dostál 60'; Matoušek 63'; Wojnar 79' (o.g.)	Stadium: Generali Arena - Platz 2

13 July 2024 Friendly	Austria Wien	1–0	FC Zlín
11:00	Fitz (penalty missed) 12', 13'		Natchkebia (yellow card) 55' (yellow-red card) 71'

19 July 2024 Friendly	Austria Wien	1–3	Porto	Vienna
19:00	Lucas Galvão 45+2'		Franco 10'; Borges 74'; González 85'	Stadium: Generali Arena

5 September 2024 Friendly	Austria Wien	2–2	St. Pölten	Gloggnitz
18:00		Report		Stadium: Krammer-Arena

11 October 2024 Friendly	Admira Wacker	0–3	Austria Wien	Maria Enzersdorf
15:00		Report		Stadium: Datenpol Arena

15 November 2024 Friendly	Traiskirchen	1–3	Austria Wien	Traiskirchen
18:00 CET	Marvin Trost 66'	Report	Wustinger 30'; Raguž 43'; Niklas Schneider 44' (o.g.)	Stadium: Sportzentrum Traiskirchen

11 January 2025 Friendly	Austria Wien	2–1	Mura	Belek
14:00 EET	Raguž 57' 74'	Report	Jaka Domjan 88'	Stadium: Titanic Sports Center - Field 1

16 January 2025 Friendly	Austria Wien	0–0	TSC	Belek
14:00 EET		Report		Stadium: Titanic Sports Center - Field 1

25 January 2025 Friendly	Austria Wien	2–1	Admira Wacker	Wien
14:00 CET	Prelec 42'; Vinlöf 45+5'	Report	Summers 21'	Stadium: Generali Arena

== Competitions ==
=== Overall record ===
Competition	First match	Last match	Starting round	Final position	Record							
Competition	First match	Last match	Starting round	Final position	Pld	W	D	L	GF	GA	GD	Win %
Austrian Football Bundesliga	4 August 2024		Matchday 1		6	2	2	2	8	7	+1	33.33
Austrian Cup	28 July 2024		First round		2	2	0	0	9	2	+7	100.00
UEFA Conference League	25 July 2024	1 August 2024	Second qualifying round	Second qualifying round	2	1	0	1	5	5	+0	50.00
Total					10	5	2	3	22	14	+8	50.00

Last updated: 22 September 2024
Source: Soccerway

=== Austrian Football Bundesliga ===
==== League table ====
Pos	Team	Pld	W	D	L	GF	GA	GD	Pts	Qualification
1	Sturm Graz	22	14	4	4	51	28	+23	46	Qualification for the Championship round
2	Austria Wien	22	14	4	4	36	19	+17	46	Qualification for the Championship round
3	Red Bull Salzburg	22	10	8	4	33	22	+11	38	Qualification for the Championship round
4	Wolfsberg	22	11	3	8	44	30	+14	36	Qualification for the Championship round
5	Rapid Wien	22	9	7	6	32	24	+8	34	Qualification for the Championship round

Source: Austrian Football Bundesliga
Rules for classification: 1) Points; 2) Head-to-head record; 3) Goal difference; 4) Goals scored; 5) Matches won; 6) Away matches won; 7) Away goals scored.

==== Results summary ====
Overall								Home						Away					
Pld	W	D	L	GF	GA	GD	Pts	W	D	L	GF	GA	GD	W	D	L	GF	GA	GD
21	13	4	4	34	19	+15	43	9	1	1	22	8	+14	4	3	3	12	11	+1

Last updated: 9 March 2025.
Source: ADMIRAL Bundesliga

==== Results by round ====
Round	1	2	3	4	5	6	7	8	9	10	11	12	13	14	15	16	17	18	19	20	21	22
Ground	A	H	A	H	A	H	A	A	H	A	H	H	A	H	A	H	A	H	H	A	H	A
Result	L	W	D	W	D	D	L	L	W	W	W	W	W	W	W	W	D	W	L	W	W	
Position	10	5	5	3	5	6	6	7	6	5	4	4	4	2	2	2	2	2	2	2	2	

Updated to match(es) played on 9 March 2025. Source: ADMIRAL Bundesliga
A = Away; H = Home; W = Win; D = Draw; L = Loss

==== Matches ====
4 August 2024 1	Blau-Weiß Linz	1–0	Austria Wien	Linz
17:00	Ronivaldo (yellow card) 31'; Pirkl (yellow card) 33'; Seidl 78'; Moormann (yellow card) 90+2'	Report	Gruber (yellow card) 53'; Abubakr Barry (yellow card) 57'; Prelec (yellow card) 64'; Potzmann (yellow card) 72'; Fitz (yellow card) 86'	Stadium: Donauparkstadion; Attendance: 5,595; Referee: (Austria) Alexander Harkam

11 August 2024 2	Austria Wien	3–1	Wolfsberger AC	Wien
17:00 CET	Lucas Galvão (yellow card) 31'; Ranftl (yellow card) 35'; Dragović (yellow card) 38'; Gruber 69'; Husković 90+3'; Martins (yellow card) 90+5'; Fitz 90+6'	Report	Zukić 26'; Piesinger (yellow card) 29'; Wimmer (red card) 82'	Stadium: Generali Arena; Attendance: 10,673; Referee: (Austria) Stefan Ebner

18 August 2024 3	Hartberg	1–1	Austria Wien	Hartberg
17:00 CET	Patrik Mijić 28'; Avdijaj (yellow card) 48'; Diarra (yellow card) 85'	Report	Malone 3'; Prelec (yellow card) 37'; Abubakr Barry (yellow card) 71'; Dragović (yellow card) 73'; Cristiano (yellow card) 89'; Vinlöf (yellow card) 90+5'	Stadium: Profertil Arena Hartberg; Attendance: 3,589; Referee: (Austria) Christopher Jäger

25 August 2024 4	Austria Wien	2–1	LASK	Wien
17:00 CET	Malone 20'; Fischer (yellow card) 41' (goal) 87'	Report	Ljubičić 19'; Stojković (yellow card) 77'	Stadium: Generali Arena; Attendance: 11,796; Referee: (Austria) Christian-Petru Ciochirca

1 September 2024 5	Rheindorf Altach	1–1	Austria Wien	Altach
17:00 CET	Paul Koller 26'; Demaku (yellow card) 37'; Gugganig (yellow card) 56'	Report	Gruber 18'; Fischer (yellow card) 30'; Lucas Galvão (yellow card) 45+3'; Abubakr Barry (yellow card) 53'; Vinlöf (yellow card) 83'; Malone (yellow card) 84'	Stadium: CASHPOINT Arena; Attendance: 5,276; Referee: (Austria) Markus Hameter

22 September 2024 7	Rapid Wien	2–1	Austria Wien	Wien
17:00 CET	Sangaré (yellow card) 21'; Beljo 23'; Seidl 60'; Bolla (yellow card) 90+2'	Report	Gruber 45'; Ranftl (yellow card) 54'; Lucas Galvão (yellow card) 80'; Fitz (yellow card) 80'; Wiesinger (yellow card) 84'	Stadium: Allianz Stadion; Attendance: 25,998; Referee: (Austria) Christian-Petru Ciochirca

25 September 2024 6	Austria Wien	2–2	Sturm Graz	Wien
18:30 CET	Vinlöf (yellow card) 35' (goal) 60'; Abubakr Barry (yellow card) 49'; Fischer (yellow card) 59'; Lucas Galvão 74'; Fitz (yellow card) 77'	Report	Bøving 24'; Yalcouyé (yellow card) 41'; Jatta 41' (yellow card) 45+1' (yellow-red card) 57'; Karić (yellow card) 48' (yellow-red card) 53'; Gazibegović (yellow card) 88'	Stadium: Generali Arena; Attendance: 12,323; Referee: (Austria) Walter Altmann

28 September 2024 8	Red Bull Salzburg	2–0	Austria Wien	Wals-Siezenheim
17:00 CET	Gloukh 10' (pen.) 88'	Report	Abubakr Barry (yellow card) 9'; Fitz (yellow card) 41'; Ranftl (yellow card) 52'	Stadium: Red Bull Arena; Attendance: 12,586; Referee: (Austria) Alan Kijas

5 October 2024 9	Austria Wien	2–1	Grazer AK	Wien
17:00 CET	Fitz 24' (pen.); Lucas Galvão (yellow card) 28'; Malone (yellow card) 36'; Lukas Graf 70' (o.g.); Vinlöf (yellow card) 73'	Report	Marco Gantschnig (yellow card) 23'; Dressel (yellow card) 26'; Thorsten Schriebl (yellow card) 49'; Lucas Galvão 51' (o.g.); Italiano (yellow card) 65'; Satin (yellow card) 68'; Filipović (yellow card) 90+6' (yellow-red card) 90+9'	Stadium: Generali Arena; Attendance: 13,222; Referee: (Austria) Florian Jäger

20 October 2024 10	Austria Klagenfurt	0–1	Austria Wien	Klagenfurt am Wörthersee
14:30 CET	Jaritz (yellow card) 17'; Straudi (yellow card) 69'; Niklas Szerencsi (yellow card) 87'	Report	Maybach (yellow card) 45'; Lucas Galvão (yellow card) 52'; Wiesinger (yellow card) 71'; Dragović (yellow card) 74'; Gruber 77'	Stadium: 28 Black Arena; Attendance: 3,974; Referee: (Austria) Sebastian Gishamer

26 October 2024 11	Austria Wien	3–0	WSG Tirol	Wien
17:00 CET	Malone (yellow card) 45+1' (goal) 73'; Prelec 55'; Plavotić 63'	Report	Okungbowa (yellow card) 48'; Üstündag (yellow card) 59'	Stadium: Generali Arena; Attendance: 11,350; Referee: (Austria) Stefan Ebner

3 November 2024 12	Austria Wien	2–1	Blau-Weiß Linz	Wien
17:00 CET	Maybach (yellow card) 39'; Malone 52'; Prelec 60' (yellow card) 72'; Wiesinger (yellow card) 87'	Report	Seidl 30'; Pirkl (yellow card) 44'	Stadium: Generali Arena; Attendance: 14,603; Referee: (Austria) Jakob Semler

9 November 2024 13	Wolfsberger AC	0–1	Austria Wien	Wolfsberg
17:00 CET		Report	Abubakr Barry (yellow card) 46'; Lucas Galvão (yellow card) 55'; Malone 61'; Fischer (yellow card) 87'	Stadium: Lavanttal-Arena; Attendance: 3,110; Referee: (Austria) Christopher Jäger

24 November 2024 14	Austria Wien	1–0	Hartberg	Wien
17:00 CET	Wiesinger (yellow card) 25'; Plavotić 78'; Fitz (yellow card) 88'	Report	Fabian Wilfinger (yellow card) 7'; Kainz (yellow card) 11'; Komposch (yellow card) 69'; Demir (yellow card) 87'	Stadium: Generali Arena; Attendance: 12,747; Referee: (Austria) Walter Altmann

1 December 2024 15	LASK	1–3	Austria Wien	Linz
17:00 CET	Bogarde (yellow card) 64'; Flecker 72'; Stojković (red card) 90+8'; Taoui (yellow card) 90+9'	Report	Fischer 20'; Abubakr Barry 48'; Prelec (yellow card) 68'; Malone 78'; Plavotić (yellow card) 90+9'	Stadium: Raiffeisen Arena; Attendance: 14,467; Referee: (Austria) Christian-Petru Ciochirca

8 December 2024 16	Austria Wien	3–0	Rheindorf Altach	Wien
17:00 CET	Fitz 12' (pen.); Dragović (yellow card) 53'; Ranftl 64'; Prelec 76'; Raguž (yellow card) 90+2'	Report	Estrada (yellow card) 19'; Demaku (yellow card) 43'; Djawal Kaiba (yellow card) 43'; Paul Koller (yellow card) 45+2'; Kronverger (yellow card) 61'	Stadium: Generali Arena; Attendance: 11,967; Referee: (Austria) Alexander Harkam

7 February 2025 17	Sturm Graz	2–2	Austria Wien	Graz
20:30 CET	Jatta 29'; Bøving 60'; Geyrhofer (yellow card) 73'	Report	Prelec 37'; Pérez Vinlöf (yellow card) 47'; Fitz 74' (pen.); Potzmann (yellow card) 90+3'	Stadium: Liebenauer Stadium; Attendance: 15,177; Referee: (Austria) Sebastian Gishamer

16 February 2025 18	Austria Wien	2–1	Rapid Wien	Wien
17:00 CET	Fitz 41' (pen.), 47', (yellow card) 78'; Gruber (yellow card) 90+5'	Report	Wurmbrand (yellow card) 22'; Sangaré 30', (yellow card) 78'; Cvetković (yellow card) 38'; Beljo (yellow card) 58'; Grgić (yellow card) 73'; Kara (yellow card) 76'	Stadium: Generali Arena; Attendance: 15,300; Referee: (Austria) Julian Weinberger

22 February 2025 19	Austria Wien	0–1	Red Bull Salzburg	Wien
17:00 CET	Dragović (yellow card) 65'	Report	Baidoo (yellow card) 4'; Gloukh 7'; Yeo (yellow card) 78'; Diambou (yellow card) 90'	Stadium: Generali Arena; Attendance: 13,648; Referee: (Austria) Stefan Ebner

1 March 2025 20	Grazer AK	1–2	Austria Wien	Graz
17:00 CET	Lichtenberger (yellow card) 19'; Satin (yellow card) 45+2'; Graf (yellow card) 48'; Rosenberger (yellow card) 74'; Cipot 90+1'; Kleinheisler (yellow card) 90+2'	Report	Fitz 56' (pen.); Malone 62'; Guenouche (yellow card) 73'	Stadium: Liebenauer Stadium; Attendance: 5,700; Referee: (Austria) Markus Hameter

9 March 2025 21	Austria Wien	2–0	Austria Klagenfurt	Wien
17:00 CET	Fitz 15', (yellow card) 25'; Malone 20'; Lucas Galvão (yellow card) 59'; Pérez Vinlöf (yellow card) 61'; Fischer (yellow card) 90+5'	Report	Salifou (yellow card) 16'; Bennetts (yellow card) 40'	Stadium: Generali Arena; Attendance: 14,379; Referee: (Austria) Christian-Petru Ciochirca

16 March 2025 22	WSG Tirol	0–2	Austria Wien	Innsbruck
17:00 CET	Naschberger (yellow card) 35'; Taferner (yellow card) 90+1'	Report	Fitz 57' (pen.), (yellow card) 63'; Gruber 81'; Lucas Galvão (yellow card) 84'; Şahin-Radlinger (yellow card) 86'	Stadium: Tivoli Stadion Tirol; Attendance: 2,650; Referee: (Austria) Jakob Semler

==== League table ====
Pos	Team	Pld	W	D	L	GF	GA	GD	Pts	Qualification
1	Sturm Graz (C)	32	19	6	7	66	39	+27	40	Qualification for the Champions League play-off round
2	Red Bull Salzburg	32	16	9	7	53	36	+17	38	Qualification for the Champions League second qualifying round
3	Austria Wien	32	18	6	8	47	32	+15	37	Qualification for the Conference League second qualifying round
4	Wolfsberg	32	16	7	9	60	38	+22	37	Qualification for the Europa League third qualifying round (Note: Wolfsberg qualified for the Europa League third qualifying round as the 2024–25 Austrian Cup winners.)
5	Rapid Wien (O)	32	12	8	12	43	42	+1	27	Qualification for the Conference League play-offs

Source: Austrian Football Bundesliga
Rules for classification: 1) Points; 2) Points with (possible) half points subtracted due to rounding; 3) Head-to-head points; 4) Head-to-head goal difference; 5) Head-to-head goals scored; 6) Goal difference; 7) Goals scored; 8) Matches won; 9) Away matches won; 10) Away goals scored.
(C) Champions; (O) Play-off winners

==== Matches ====
30 March 2025 23	Blau-Weiß Linz	0–2	Austria Wien	Linz
14:30 CET	Briedl (yellow card) 41'	Report	Fitz 2', (yellow card) 33'; Ranftl 17'; Potzmann (yellow card) 71'	Stadium: Donauparkstadion; Attendance: 5,595; Referee: (Austria) Christian-Petru Ciochirca

6 April 2025 24	Austria Wien	0–0	Wolfsberger AC	Wien
17:00 CET	Plavotić (yellow card) 72'; Barry (yellow card) 90'	Report	Piesinger (yellow card) 63'; Nwaiwu (yellow card) 84'; Diabaté (yellow card) 86'	Stadium: Generali Arena; Attendance: 11,573; Referee: (Austria) Arnes Talic

13 April 2025 25	Rapid Wien	2–0	Austria Wien	Wien
17:00 CET	Seidl 5'; Sangaré 70'	Report	Fitz (yellow card) 20'; Wiesinger (yellow card) 61'	Stadium: Allianz Stadion; Attendance: 22,669; Referee: (Austria) Walter Altmann

20 April 2025 26	Austria Wien	1–3	Red Bull Salzburg	Wien
17:00 CET	Malone 17'; Ranftl (yellow card) 42'; Handl (yellow card) 42'; Dragović (yellow card) 69'	Report	Vertessen 8', (yellow card) 59'; Nene 11', 64' (pen.); Terzić (yellow card) 51'; Schlager (yellow card) 90'	Stadium: Generali Arena; Attendance: 13,245; Referee: (Austria) Christian-Petru Ciochirca

23 April 2025 27	Austria Wien	2–1	Sturm Graz	Wien
20:30 CET	Malone 40', (yellow card) 63'; Plavotić (yellow card) 45'; Prelec 61'; Barry (yellow card) 78'	Report	Yalcouyé (yellow card) 43'; Johnston 45'; Aiwu (yellow card) 53'; Hodl (yellow card) 90+2'	Stadium: Generali Arena; Attendance: 14,457; Referee: (Austria) Christopher Jäger

27 April 2025 28	Sturm Graz	0–1	Austria Wien	Graz
17:00 CET	Grgić (yellow card) 3' (yellow-red card) 66'; Bøving (red card) 29'; Wüthrich (yellow card) 29'; Kiteishvili (yellow card) 66'; Lavalée (yellow card) 84'; Hierlander (yellow card) 90+10'	Report	Wiesinger (yellow card) 48'; Ranftl (yellow card) 73' (yellow-red card) 89'; Prelec 80'; Pérez Vinlöf (yellow card) 90'; Malone (yellow card) 90+9'; Guenouche (yellow card) 90+10'	Stadium: Merkur-Arena; Attendance: 15,427; Referee: (Austria) Sebastian Gishamer

4 May 2025 29	Red Bull Salzburg	2–0	Austria Wien	Wals-Siezenheim
17:00 CET	Nene 80'; Ratkov 89'	Report	Plavotić (yellow card) 43'	Stadium: Red Bull Arena; Attendance: 11,851; Referee: (Austria) Markus Hameter

11 May 2025 30	Austria Wien	1–2	Rapid Wien	Wien
17:00 CET	Prelec (yellow card) 12'; Pérez Vinlöf (yellow card) 27'; Dragović (yellow card) 47'; Fitz 80' (pen.), (yellow card) 87'; Malone (yellow card) 80'	Report	Burgstaller 32'; Bolla (yellow card) 52'; Hedl (yellow card) 67'; Kara 84'	Stadium: Generali Arena; Attendance: 14,622; Referee: (Austria) Christopher Jäger

18 May 2025 31	Wolfsberger AC	1–2	Austria Wien	Wolfsberg
17:00 CET	Omić 62'	Report	Malone 46'; Fischer 50', (yellow card) 76'	Stadium: Lavanttal-Arena; Attendance: 7,775; Referee: (Austria) Alexander Harkam

24 May 2025 32	Austria Wien	2–2	Blau-Weiß Linz	Wien
17:00 CET	Fitz 33' (pen.); Dragović (yellow card) 53'; Guenouche (yellow card) 88'; Wiesinger 90'	Report	Bakatukanda (yellow card) 66'; Schmidt 78'; Wähling 90+2'	Stadium: Generali Arena; Attendance: 14,780; Referee: (Austria) Walter Altmann

=== Austrian Cup ===
28 July 2024 First round	FC Pinzgau Saalfelden	0–6	Austria Wien	Saalfelden
16:00		Report	Fitz 16'; Gruber 20'; Pazourek 36'; Plavotic 40'; Prelec 59'; Husković 77'	Stadium: 1508 Saalfelden Arena; Attendance: 1,000; Referee: Markus Greinecker

28 August 2024 Second round	ASKÖ Oedt	2–3	Austria Wien	Traun
19:00 CET	Vidakovic 2'; Alukwu 79'	Report	Prelec 10'; Husković 11'; Plavotić (yellow card) 45+1'; Fischer 83' (pen.); Kos (yellow card) 90+4'	Stadium: Transdanubia Sportanlage Oedt; Attendance: 1,200; Referee: (Austria) Philip Gadler

30 October 2024 Round of 16	SV Horn	0–1	Austria Wien	Horn
18:15 CET	Haris Ismailcebioglu (yellow card) 53'; Julian Hinterleitner (yellow card) 85'	Report	Lucas Galvão (yellow card) 10' (goal) 35'; Abubakr Barry (yellow card) 27'; Raguž (yellow card) 27'; Fischer (yellow card) 47'; Maybach (yellow card) 50'	Stadium: Sparkasse Horn Arena; Attendance: 3,425; Referee: (Austria) Markus Hameter

1 February 2025 Quarter Finals	Sturm Graz	0–2	Austria Wien	Graz
18:15 CET	Jatta (yellow card) 29'; Yalcouyé (yellow card) 87'; Wüthrich (yellow card) 90+3'; Geyrhofer (yellow card) 90+5'	Report	Vinlöf (yellow card) 5'; Ranftl 9'; Raguž 89'; Kos (yellow card) 90+3'; Dragović (yellow card) 90+4'; Fischer (yellow card) 90+4'; Guenouche (yellow card) 90+5'	Stadium: Merkur-Arena; Attendance: 15,400; Referee: (Austria) Christopher Jäger

2 April 2025 Semi-finals	Austria Wien	0–1	Hartberg	Wien
20:30 CET	Malone (yellow card) 75'; Barry (yellow card) 79'; Ranftl (yellow card) 88'; Fitz (yellow card) 90+4'; Dragović (red card) 90+6'	Report	Kainz (yellow card) 17'; Demir (yellow card) 47'; Avdijaj 54'; Diarra (yellow card) 90'	Stadium: Generali Arena; Attendance: 14,237; Referee: Sebastian Gishamer

=== UEFA Conference League ===
==== Second qualifying round ====
The draw was held on 19 June 2024.

25 July 2024 First leg	Ilves (Finland)	2–1	Austria Wien	Tampere, Finland
19:00 UTC+3	Haarala 51', (yellow card) 85'; Ala-Myllymäki (yellow card) 67'; Riski 88'	Report	Husković (yellow card) 29'; Martins (yellow card) 31'; Barry (yellow card) 75'; Galvão (yellow card) 85', (goal) 90'	Stadium: Tammelan Stadion; Attendance: 6,870; Referee: Alejandro Muñiz Ruiz (Spain)

31 July 2024 Second leg	Austria Wien	4–3 (a.e.t.) (5–5 agg.) (4–5 p)	(Finland) Ilves	Vienna
20:30 UTC+2	Malone 22'; Gruber 27'; Ranftl (yellow card) 58'; Barry 68'; Husković (yellow card) 93'; Prelec 97'; Fitz (yellow card) 99'	Report	Ala-Myllymäki 30'; Mäenpää 89'; Pikkarainen (yellow card) 95'; Arifi (yellow card) 99'; Popovitch (yellow card) 101'; Ulundu (yellow card) 107'; Söderbäck 112'	Stadium: Franz Horr Stadium; Attendance: 8,555; Referee: Ian McNabb (Northern Ireland)
	Penalties
	Fischer (penalty scored); Galvão (penalty scored); Pérez Vinlöf (penalty scored); Meisl (penalty scored); Fitz (penalty missed)		(penalty scored) Arifi; (penalty scored) Popovitch; (penalty scored) Haarala; (penalty scored) Pikkarainen; (penalty scored) Riski

=== Appearances and goals ===
As of match played 24 May 2025

Players with no appearances are not included on the list
Italics indicate a loaned in player

No.	Pos	Nat	Player	Total		Bundesliga		Austrian Cup		UEFA Conference League	
No.	Pos	Nat	Player	Apps	Goals	Apps	Goals	Apps	Goals	Apps	Goals
1	GK	(Austria) AUT	Samuel Şahin-Radlinger	34	0	32+0	0	0+0	0	2+0	0
2	DF	(Austria) AUT	Luca Pazourek	4	1	0+2	0	1+0	1	0+1	0
3	DF	(Brazil) BRA	Lucas Galvão	26	3	15+7	1	2+0	1	2+0	1
5	DF	(The Gambia) GAM	Abubakr Barry	37	2	27+3	1	5+0	0	2+0	1
6	MF	(Austria) AUT	Philipp Maybach	9	0	4+3	0	1+1	0	0+0	0
11	FW	(Slovenia) SLO	Nik Prelec	38	9	30+1	6	5+0	2	0+2	1
15	DF	(Austria) AUT	Aleksandar Dragović	32	0	29+0	0	3+0	0	0+0	0
17	FW	(Austria) AUT	Andreas Gruber	35	7	13+16	5	2+2	1	1+1	1
18	DF	(Sweden) SWE	Matteo Pérez Vinlöf	37	1	22+9	1	4+1	0	0+1	0
19	DF	(Austria) AUT	Marvin Potzmann	25	0	2+18	0	1+2	0	2+0	0
21	DF	(France) FRA	Hakim Guenouche	26	0	11+11	0	1+1	0	2+0	0
22	MF	(Austria) AUT	Florian Wustinger	3	0	0+3	0	0+0	0	0+0	0
23	FW	(Austria) AUT	Konstantin Aleksa	9	0	0+9	0	0+0	0	0+0	0
24	DF	(Croatia) CRO	Tin Plavotić	29	3	19+4	2	4+1	1	0+1	0
26	DF	(Austria) AUT	Reinhold Ranftl	37	3	30+0	2	3+2	1	2+0	0
28	DF	(Austria) AUT	Philipp Wiesinger	24	1	17+5	1	2+0	0	0+0	0
29	FW	(Austria) AUT	Marko Raguž	23	1	0+20	0	1+2	1	0+0	0
30	MF	(Austria) AUT	Manfred Fischer	38	4	30+1	3	2+3	1	2+0	0
36	MF	(Austria) AUT	Dominik Fitz	36	13	29+1	12	4+0	1	2+0	0
37	MF	(Austria) AUT	Moritz Wels	14	0	0+12	0	2+0	0	0+0	0
46	DF	(Austria) AUT	Johannes Handl	17	0	11+4	0	1+1	0	0+0	0
77	FW	(Germany) GER	Maurice Malone	38	12	31+0	11	2+3	0	2+0	1
99	GK	(Austria) AUT	Mirko Kos	5	0	0+0	0	5+0	0	0+0	0
Player(s) who featured whilst on loan but returned to parent club during the season:
70	FW	(Brazil) BRA	Cristiano	8	0	0+6	0	1+1	0	0+0	0
Player(s) who featured but departed the club permanently during the season:
66	DF	(Luxembourg) LUX	Marvin Martins	4	0	0+2	0	0+0	0	2+0	0
Player(s) who featured but departed the club on loan during the season:
9	FW	(Austria) AUT	Muharem Husković	10	3	0+6	1	1+1	2	1+1	0
25	DF	(Nigeria) NGR	David Ewemade	1	0	0+1	0	0+0	0	0+0	0
40	DF	(Austria) AUT	Matteo Meisl	4	0	0+0	0	2+0	0	0+2	0
