= 2023–24 FK Austria Wien season =

FK Austria Wien
2023–24 season
- Manager: Michael Wimmer
- Stadium: Generali Arena
- Austrian Football Bundesliga: 8th
- Austrian Cup: Quarter-finals
- UEFA Europa Conference League: Third qualifying round
- Top goalscorer: League: Andreas Gruber (10); All: Andreas Gruber (14)

The 2023–24 FK Austria Wien season was the club's 113th season in existence and its 79th consecutive season in the top flight of Austrian football. In addition to the domestic league, Austria Wien participated in this season's edition of the Austrian Cup and the UEFA Europa Conference League. The season covered the period from 1 July 2023 to 30 June 2024.

== Players ==
=== First-team squad ===
As of 6 February 2024

Note: Flags indicate national team as defined under FIFA eligibility rules; some limited exceptions apply. Players may hold more than one non-FIFA nationality.

No.	Pos.	Nation	Player
1	GK	GER	Christian Früchtl
2	DF	AUT	Luca Pazourek
3	DF	BRA	Lucas Galvão
4	DF	AUT	Ziad El Sheiwi
8	MF	AUS	James Holland
9	FW	AUT	Muharem Husković
10	FW	KOS	Fisnik Asllani (on loan from Hoffenheim)
11	FW	AUT	Manuel Polster
13	GK	AUT	Lukas Wedl
17	FW	AUT	Andreas Gruber
19	DF	AUT	Marvin Potzmann
21	DF	FRA	Hakim Guenouche
22	MF	AUT	Florian Wustinger
24	DF	CRO	Tin Plavotić

No.	Pos.	Nation	Player
26	MF	AUT	Reinhold Ranftl
27	FW	AUT	Romeo Vučić
29	FW	AUT	Marko Raguž
30	MF	AUT	Manfred Fischer
33	FW	AUT	Alexander Schmidt
36	FW	AUT	Dominik Fitz
37	MF	AUT	Moritz Wels
40	DF	AUT	Matteo Meisl
41	DF	GER	Frans Krätzig (on loan from Bayern Munich)
46	DF	AUT	Johannes Handl
60	FW	ISR	Ayi Silva Kangani
66	DF	LUX	Marvin Martins
99	GK	AUT	Mirko Kos

=== Out on loan ===
Note: Flags indicate national team as defined under FIFA eligibility rules; some limited exceptions apply. Players may hold more than one non-FIFA nationality.

No.	Pos.	Nation	Player
—	GK	AUT	Sandali Conde (at Stripfing until 30 June 2024)
—	GK	AUT	Samuel Şahin-Radlinger (at Almere City until 30 June 2024)
—	DF	AUT	Leonardo Ivkić (at Stripfing until 30 June 2024)
—	DF	AUT	Florian Kopp (at Stripfing until 30 June 2024)
—	DF	AUT	Tobias Polz (at Stripfing until 30 June 2024)
—	DF	AUT	Dejan Radonjic (at Stripfing until 30 June 2024)
—	MF	AUT	Denis Dizdarević (at Stripfing until 30 June 2024)
—	MF	AUT	Matthias Braunöder (at Como until 30 June 2024)

No.	Pos.	Nation	Player
—	MF	AUT	Dario Kreiker (at Stripfing until 30 June 2024)
—	MF	TUR	Enis Safin (at Stripfing until 30 June 2024)
—	MF	AUT	Sanel Saljic (at Stripfing until 30 June 2024)
—	MF	AUT	Timo Schmelzer (at Stripfing until 30 June 2024)
—	FW	AUT	Daniel Au Yeong (at Stripfing until 30 June 2024)
—	FW	AUT	Lukas Haubenwaller (at Neusiedl am See until 30 June 2024)
—	FW	AUT	Can Keleş (at Fatih Karagümrük until 30 June 2024)

== Transfers ==
=== In ===
Pos.	Player	Transferred from	Fee	Date	Source
MF	(Austria) Marvin Potzmann	(Austria) LASK	Free	1 July 2023	
DF	(Austria) Reinhold Ranftl	(Germany) Schalke 04	Undisclosed	1 July 2023	
FW	(Germany) Fisnik Asllani	(Germany) 1899 Hoffenheim	Loan	31 August 2023	
GK	(Austria) Samuel Şahin-Radlinger	(Austria) SV Ried	Free	31 August 2023	

=== Out ===
Pos.	Player	Transferred to	Fee	Date	Source
FW	(Bosnia and Herzegovina) Haris Tabaković	(Germany) Hertha BSC	€500,000	1 August 2023	
GK	(Austria) Samuel Şahin-Radlinger	(Netherlands) Almere City	Loan	1 September 2023	

== Pre-season and friendlies ==
Win Draw Loss Fixtures

18 July 2023 Friendly	Austria Wien	1–1	Aris Limassol
18:00 CEST (UTC+2)

16 November 2023 Friendly	Austria Wien	3–2	SKN St. Pölten
15:00 CET (UTC+1)

10 January 2024 Tipsport Malta Cup	Hradec Králové	v	Austria Wien
17:00 CET (UTC+1)

13 January 2024 Tipsport Malta Cup	Spartak Trnava	v	Austria Wien
11:00 CET (UTC+1)

15 January 2024 Tipsport Malta Cup	Sigma Olomouc	v	Austria Wien
16:00 CET (UTC+1)

== Competitions ==
=== Overview ===
Competition	First match	Last match	Starting round	Final position	Record							
Competition	First match	Last match	Starting round	Final position	Pld	W	D	L	GF	GA	GD	Win %
Austrian Football Bundesliga	August 2023	May 2024	Matchday 1		17	5	6	6	16	16	+0	29.41
Austrian Cup	22 July 2023		First round		3	3	0	0	12	0	+12	100.00
UEFA Europa Conference League	27 July 2023	17 August 2023	Second qualifying round	Third qualifying round	4	3	0	1	8	6	+2	75.00
Total					24	11	6	7	36	22	+14	45.83

Last updated: 9 December 2023
Source: Soccerway

=== Austrian Football Bundesliga ===
==== League table ====
Pos	Team	Pld	W	D	L	GF	GA	GD	Pts	Qualification
5	Hartberg	22	9	7	6	33	28	+5	34 (Note: Head to head points: Klagenfurt 4, TSV Hartberg 1.)	Qualification for the Championship round
6	Rapid Wien	22	8	9	5	38	21	+17	33 (Note: Head to head points: Rapid 4, Austria Wien 1.)	Qualification for the Championship round
7	Austria Wien	22	9	6	7	25	22	+3	33	Qualification for the Relegation round
8	Wolfsberger AC	22	8	6	8	29	32	−3	30	Qualification for the Relegation round
9	SCR Altach	22	4	7	11	17	30	−13	19	Qualification for the Relegation round

Source: Austrian Football Bundesliga
Rules for classification: 1) Points; 2) Head-to-head record; 3) Goal difference; 4) Goals scored; 5) Matches won; 6) Away matches won; 7) Away goals scored.
Notes:

Pos	Team	Pld	W	D	L	GF	GA	GD	Pts	Qualification	STU	RBS	LASK	RWI	HAR	AKL
1	Sturm Graz (C)	32	19	10	3	56	23	+33	44	Qualification for the Champions League league stage	—	0–1	1–0	1–0	1–1	2–0
2	Red Bull Salzburg	32	20	7	5	74	29	+45	42	Qualification for the Champions League third qualifying round (Note: Since the Europa League winners, Atalanta qualified for the Champions League via league position, Red Bull Salzburg were promoted from the Champions League second qualifying round to the third qualifying round as one of the two teams with the highest coefficient in the second qualifying round.)	2–2	—	7–1	1–1	5–1	4–2
3	LASK	32	14	10	8	43	33	+10	34	Qualification for the Europa League play-off round (Note: The 2023–24 Austrian Cup winners qualified for the Europa League play-off round. Since the cup winners (Sturm Graz) qualified based on league position, the Europa League spot was passed to the third-placed team.)	2–2	3–1	—	5–0	1–3	1–0
4	Rapid Wien	32	11	12	9	47	35	+12	28	Qualification for the Europa League second qualifying round	1–3	2–0	0–0	—	0–3	1–1
5	Hartberg	32	12	9	11	49	52	−3	28	Qualification for the Conference League play-offs	1–3	1–5	1–2	0–3	—	3–2
6	Austria Klagenfurt	32	9	12	11	40	50	−10	22		0–4	4–3	0–2	0–1	2–2	—

Source: Austrian Football Bundesliga
Legend: Blue = home team win; Yellow = draw; Red = away team win.
Rules for classification: 1) Points; 2) Points with (possible) half points subtracted due to rounding; 3) Head-to-head points; 4) Head-to-head goal difference; 5) Head-to-head goals scored; 6) Goal difference; 7) Goals scored; 8) Matches won; 9) Away matches won; 10) Away goals scored.
(C) Champions
Notes:

Pos	Team	Pld	W	D	L	GF	GA	GD	Pts	Qualification	WOL	AWI	BWL	ALT	WAT	LUS
1	Wolfsberger AC	32	12	10	10	41	39	+2	31	Qualification for the Conference League play-offs	—	0–1	0–2	0–0	3–1	1–1
2	Austria Wien (O)	32	12	10	10	35	34	+1	29	Qualification for the Conference League play-offs	0–4	—	0–0	2–2	3–0	1–1
3	Blau-Weiß Linz	32	7	11	14	33	48	−15	22		0–0	1–2	—	2–1	3–2	0–0
4	Rheindorf Altach	32	6	13	13	27	40	−13	21		0–1	1–1	2–2	—	0–0	2–2
5	WSG Tirol	32	7	5	20	29	55	−26	19		1–1	1–0	2–1	0–1	—	0–0
6	Austria Lustenau (R)	32	4	9	19	22	58	−36	16	Relegation to Austrian Football Second League	1–2	2–0	1–0	0–1	1–2	—

Legend: Blue = home team win; Yellow = draw; Red = away team win.
Rules for classification: 1) Points; 2) Points with (possible) half points subtracted due to rounding; 3) Head-to-head points; 4) Head-to-head goal difference; 5) Head-to-head goals scored; 6) Head-to-head away goals scored; 7) Goal difference; 8) Goals scored; 9) Matches won; 10) Away matches won; 11) Away goals scored.
(O) Play-off winners; (R) Relegated

==== Results summary ====
Overall								Home						Away					
Pld	W	D	L	GF	GA	GD	Pts	W	D	L	GF	GA	GD	W	D	L	GF	GA	GD
0	0	0	0	0	0	0	0	0	0	0	0	0	0	0	0	0	0	0	0

Last updated: November 2023.

==== Results by round ====
Round	1
Ground	
Result	
Position	

Updated to match(es) played on November 2023. Source:
A = Away; H = Home; W = Win; D = Draw; L = Loss

==== Matches ====
The league fixtures were unveiled on 27 June 2023.

August 2023 1	v

=== Austrian Cup ===
The draw for the season's first round took place on 25 June.

21 July 2023 First round	SV SPORTASTIC Spittal	v	Austria Wien

=== UEFA Europa Conference League ===
==== Qualifying rounds ====
===== Second qualifying round =====
27 July 2023 First leg	Austria Wien	1–0	(Bosnia and Herzegovina) Borac Banja Luka	Vienna, Austria
20:30 CEST (UTC+2)	Holland (yellow card) 37'; Ranftl (yellow card) 57'; Husković (yellow card) 87'; Tabaković 90+4'	Report	Cortés (yellow card) 57'; Predragović (yellow card) 69'; D. Milkanović (not on pitch) (yellow card) 89'	Stadium: Franz Horr Stadium; Attendance: 9,717; Referee: Joey Kooij (Netherlands)

3 August 2023 Second leg	Borac Banja Luka (Bosnia and Herzegovina)	1–2 (1–3 agg.)	Austria Wien	Banja Luka, Bosnia and Herzegovina
20:30 CEST (UTC+2)	Cortés (yellow card) 33', (goal) 49'; Vranješ (yellow card) 78'; Pejović (yellow card) 90+5'	Report	Fischer (yellow card) 9'; Holland (yellow card) 51'; Gruber 53'; Potzmann (yellow card) 62'; Polster 65', (yellow card) 90+5'; Husković (yellow card) 90+5'	Stadium: Banja Luka City Stadium; Attendance: 8,653; Referee: Urs Schnyder (Switzerland)
Note: Austria Wien won 3–1 on aggregate.

===== Third qualifying round =====
10 August 2023 First leg	Legia Warsaw (Poland)	1–2	Austria Wien	Warsaw, Poland
19:00 CEST (UTC+2)	Muçi 87'; Pekhart (yellow card) 90+5'	Report	Huskovic 11', 56'; Potzmann (yellow card) 21'; Ranftl (yellow card) 39'	Stadium: Stadion Wojska Polskiego; Attendance: 26,519; Referee: Pierre Gaillouste (France)

17 August 2023 Second leg	Austria Wien	3–5 (5–6 agg.)	(Poland) Legia Warsaw	Vienna, Austria
19:00 CEST (UTC+2)	Gruber (yellow card) 45+3', (goal) 69', 83'; M. Martins (yellow card) 64'; Fischer (yellow card) 73'; Jukić (red card) 89'; Ranftl 90+7'	Report	Elitim (yellow card) 35', (goal) 39'; Gual 45+1'; Augustyniak (yellow card) 45+4'; Pekhart 59'; Rosołek 87'; Slisz (yellow card) 90'; Josué (yellow card) 90+3'; Muçi 90+10', (yellow card) 90+10'	Stadium: Franz Horr Stadium; Attendance: 10,288; Referee: István Vad (Hungary)
Note: Legia Warsaw won 6–5 on aggregate.
