= 2020–21 FK Austria Wien season =

Austria Wien
2020–21 season
- Chairman: Frank Hensel
- Manager: Peter Stöger
- Stadium: Generali Arena
- Bundesliga: 8th
- Austrian Cup: Quarter-finals
- Top goalscorer: League: Manprit Sarkaria (7); All: Manprit Sarkaria (10)
- Highest home attendance: 3,173
- Lowest home attendance: 0
Home colours	Away colours	Third colours

FK Austria Wien played the 2020–21 season in the Austrian Bundesliga and Austrian Cup.

== Review and events ==
Austria Wien's season started in the Austrian Cup with a 5–0 win against SC Retz on 30 August 2020. The match was played without spectators due to the COVID-19 pandemic. Austria Wien defeated Wiener Sport-Club in the second round and TSV Hartberg in the round of 16 before getting knocked out by Red Bull Salzburg in the Quarter–finals.

Austria Wien's first Bundesliga match was a 1–0 loss to LASK in Linz on 11 September 2020. Unlike the first round of the Austrian Cup, Matchday one had spectators. Austria Wien's first win happened on matchday two against SV Ried. After defeating Ried, Austria Wien won only one out of their next 10 league matches. The one win was against WSG Tirol. The first match between Austria Wien and Red Bull Salzburg happened in Vienna on 24 October 2020. Red Bull Salzburg won the match 2–0. With the loss, Austria Wien dropped down to sixth place in the league table. The loss to Red Bull Salzburg started an eight match winless streak. The first Vienna derby took place at Allianz Stadion in Vienna on 29 November 2020. Austria Wien remained in eighth place. On 5 December 2020, Austria Wien lost 4–0 to Sturm Graz. Austria Wien remained in eighth place. Wolfsberger AC defeated Austria Wien 3–2 on 13 December 2020. Alon Turgeman gave Austria Wien a 1–0 lead in the first minute. But Michael Liendl scored from the penalty spot late in the match to give Wolfsberg a 3–2 lead. With the loss, Austria Wien dropped down to ninth place. 20 December 2020, Austria Wien and LASK drew 1–1. The draw sent Austria Wien down to 10th place in the league table. The last time Austria Wien was this low in the table was Matchday 1. On 23 January 2021, Austria Wien defeated Ried 1–0. The win finished the 8 match winless streak and moved Austria Wien up to ninth place. Austria Wien defeated Admira Wacker 4–0 with goals from Benedikt Pichler, Georg Teigl and two goals from Johannes Handl. Austria Wien faced Red Bull Salzburg twice in four days. On 6 February 2021, Austria Wien lost 2–0 in the quarter-finals of the Austrian Cup. Then on 10 February 2021, Austria Wien lost 3–1 in the Bundesliga. Austria Wien defeated Rheindorf Altach 5–1 on 20 February 2021. The second Vienna derby of the season took place on 7 March 2021. The match finished in a 0–0 draw. On 10 April 2021, Peter Stöger announced that he is leaving Austria Wien in the summer.

== Match results ==
=== Legend ===
Win	Draw	Loss

=== Bundesliga ===
Date	Opponent	Venue	Results F–A	Goalscorers	Attendance	Referee	Pos.	Ref.
11 September 2020 — 19:30	LASK Linz	Away	0–1	—	3,958	Sebastian Gishamer	10	
20 September 2020 — 16:00	SV Ried	Home	2–1	Monschein (2)	3,000	Rene Eisner	7	
27 September 2020 — 13:30	Admira Wacker	Home	2–2	Monschein, Pichler	3,173	Alan Kijas	6	
3 October 2020 — 16:00	WSG Tirol	Away	2–0	Wimmer, Sarkaria	950	Oliver Drachta	4	
24 October 2020 — 16:00	Red Bull Salzburg	Home	0–2	—	3,160	Walter Altmann	6	
31 October 2020 — 16:00	TSV Hartberg	Away	1–2	Pichler	977	Dieter Muckenhammer	6	
7 November 2020 — 16:00	Rheindorf Altach	Away	0–0	—	0	Sebastian Gishamer	6	
22 November 2020 — 13:30	SKN St. Pölten	Home	1–1	Jukić	0	Alexander Harkam	8	
22 November 2020 — 16:00	Rapid Wien	Away	1–1	Wimmer	0	Julian Weinberger	8	
5 December 2020 — 16:00	Sturm Graz	Home	0–4	—	0	Christopher Jäger	8	
13 December 2020 — 13:30	Wolfsberger AC	Away	2–3	Turgeman, Monschein	0	Rene Eisner	9	
20 December 2020 — 16:00	LASK	Home	1–1	Pichler	0	Christian-Petru Ciochirca	10	
23 January 2021 — 16:00	SV Ried	Away	1–0	Pichler	0	Christopher Jäger	9	
26 January 2021 — 17:30	Admira Wacker	Away	4–0	Pichler, Teigl, Handl (2)	0	Harald Lechner	7	
31 January 2021 – 13:30	WSG Tirol	Home	2–2	Martel	0	Oliver Drachta	7	
10 February 2021 — 19:30	Red Bull Salzburg	Away	1–3	Teigl	0	Dieter Muckenhammer	7	
14 February 2021 — 13:30	TSV Hartberg	Home	0–1	—	0	Walter Altmann	7	
20 February 2021 — 16:00	Rheindorf Altach	Home	5–1	Fitz (2), Schösswendter, Sarkaria (2)	0	Andreas Heiß	8	
28 February 2021 — 13:30	SKN St. Pölten	Away	2–0	Handl, Monschein	0	Christian-Petru Ciochirca	8	
7 March 2021 — 16:00	Rapid Wien	Home	0–0	—	0	Sebastian Gishamer	8	
14 March 2021 — 16:00	Sturm Graz	Away	1–2	Fitz	0	Alan Kijas	8	
21 March 2021 – 16:00	Wolfsberger AC	Home	3–5	Djuricin, Grünwald, Zeka	0	Manuel Schüttengruber	8	

=== Austrian Cup ===
Date	Round	Opponent	Venue	Result F–A	Goalscorers	Attendance	Referee	Ref.
30 August 2020 — 10:15	First round	SC Retz	Home	5–0	Sax, Monschein, Pichler, Planic (own goal), Sarkaria	0	Julian Weinberger	
16 October 2020 — 19:25	Second round	Wiener Sport-Club	Away	3–1		2,550	Harald Lechner	
25 November 2020 — 16:15	Round of 16	TSV Hartberg	Home	5–3		0	Stefan Ebner	
6 February 2021 – 16:00	Quarter-finals	Red Bull Salzburg	Away	0–2	—	0	Manuel Schüttengruber	

== Player details ==
As of Match Played 7 March 2021

No.	Pos	Nat	Player	Total		Bundesliga		Austrian Cup	
No.	Pos	Nat	Player	Apps	Goals	Apps	Goals	Apps	Goals
1	GK	(Austria) AUT	Patrick Pentz	25	0	21	0	4	0
21	GK	(Austria) AUT	Ammar Helac	0	0	0	0	0	0
99	GK	(Austria) AUT	Mirko Kos	0	0	0	0	0	0
2	DF	(Austria) AUT	Christoph Schösswendter	13	1	12	1	1	0
4	DF	(United States) USA	Erik Palmer-Brown	20	0	18	0	2	0
8	DF	(Austria) AUT	Stephan Zwierschitz	22	1	19	0	3	1
15	DF	(Austria) AUT	Michael Madl	7	0	6	0	1	0
18	DF	(Austria) AUT	Christian Schoissengeyr	0	0	0	0	0	0
20	DF	(Denmark) DEN	Andreas Poulsen	3	0	3	0	0	0
22	DF	(Germany) GER	Eric Martel	9	1	8	1	1	0
28	DF	(Austria) AUT	Christoph Martschinko	3	0	1	0	2	0
29	DF	(Austria) AUT	Markus Suttner	18	0	14	0	4	0
39	DF	(Austria) AUT	Georg Teigl	19	2	16	2	3	0
46	DF	(Austria) AUT	Johannes Handl	16	3	13	3	3	0
5	MF	(Austria) AUT	Vesel Demaku	3	0	2	0	1	0
6	MF	(Austria) AUT	Niels Hahn	5	0	4	0	1	0
9	MF	(Austria) AUT	Patrick Wimmer	25	2	21	2	4	0
10	MF	(Austria) AUT	Alexander Grünwald	17	1	14	0	3	1
16	MF	(Austria) AUT	Stefan Radulović	1	0	0	0	1	0
24	MF	(Austria) AUT	Can Keles	0	0	0	0	0	0
25	MF	(Austria) AUT	Muharem Huskovic	1	0	1	0	0	0
27	MF	(Austria) AUT	Thomas Ebner	20	0	18	0	2	0
30	MF	(Austria) AUT	Matthias Braunöder	1	0	1	0	0	0
36	MF	(Austria) AUT	Dominik Fitz	15	4	13	3	2	1
70	MF	(Austria) AUT	Manprit Sarkaria	23	6	19	3	4	3
77	MF	(Austria) AUT	Aleksandar Jukic	24	1	20	1	4	0
11	FW	(Austria) AUT	Benedikt Pichler	24	8	20	6	4	2
14	FW	(Austria) AUT	Christoph Monschein	18	7	15	5	3	2
19	FW	(Hungary) HUN	Csaba Mester	0	0	0	0	0	0
24	FW	(Albania) ALB	Agim Zeka	4	0	3	0	1	0
92	FW	(Austria) AUT	Marco Djuricin	5	0	5	0	0	0
