= Ivkić =

Ivkić is a South Slavic surname. Notable people with the surname include:

- Dominik Ivkič (born 1997), Slovenian football player
- Leonardo Ivkic (born 2003), Austrian football player
- Monika Ivkic (born 1989), Austrian singer
