= Dominik Fitz =

Austrian footballer (born 1999)

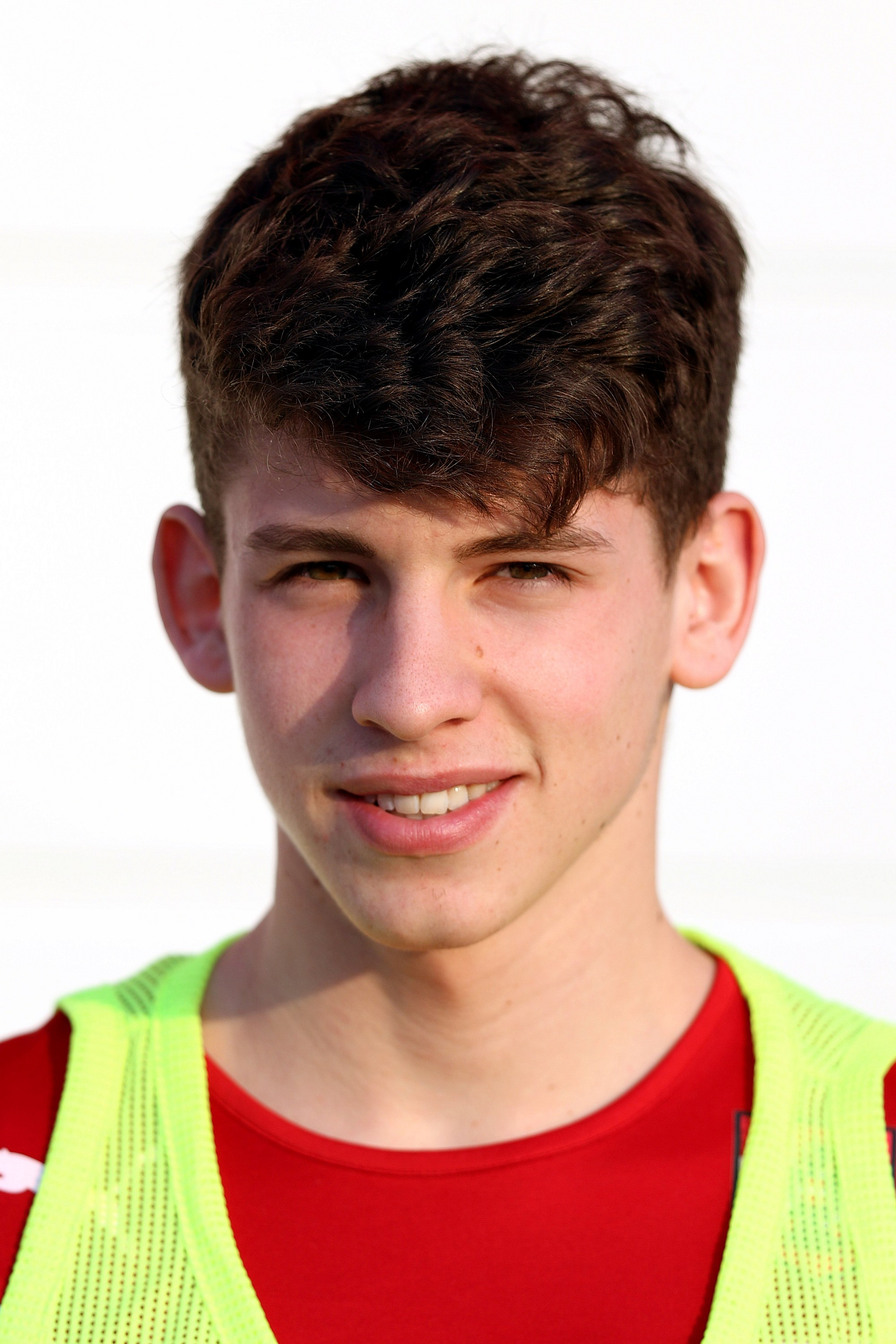

Personal information
- Date of birth: 16 June 1999 (age 27)
- Place of birth: Wien, Austria
- Height: 1.74 m (5 ft 9 in)
- Positions: Attacking midfielder; left midfielder; forward

Team information
- Current team: Wolfsberger AC (on loan from Minnesota United)
- Number: 36

Youth career
- –2006: SV Langenzersdorf
- 2006–2015: Austria Wien

Senior career*
| Years | Team | Apps | (Gls) |
| 2015–2021 | Austria Wien II | 81 | (27) |
| 2015–2025 | Austria Wien | 166 | (44) |
| 2025– | Minnesota United | 7 | (0) |
| 2026– | Minnesota United 2 | 2 | (1) |
| 2026– | → Wolfsberger AC (loan) | 1 | (0) |

International career^{‡}
| 2016 | Austria U17 | 6 | (0) |
| 2017–2018 | Austria U19 | 6 | (0) |
| 2019 | Austria U20 | 2 | (0) |
| 2019 | Austria U21 | 1 | (0) |
- * Club domestic league appearances and goals as of 7 September 2026 ‡ National team caps and goals as of 29 June 2019

Dominik Fitz (born 16 June 1999) is an Austrian professional footballer who plays as an attacking midfielder, left midfielder or forward for Austrian Bundesliga club Wolfsberger AC, on loan from Major League Soccer club Minnesota United.

== Club career ==
=== Austria Wien ===
Fitz started playing football at a local club SV Langenzersdorf, before joining the youth academy of his hometown team Austria Wien in 2006. He made his professional debut playing for Austria Wien's feeder squad, Young Violets, against SV Oberwart during March 2016 at the age of 17, coming on as a substitute for Marko Kvasina in the 71st minute. He scored his first goal in April 2016 against SC Neusiedl am See.

After appearing in over 40 matches for the Austria amateurs, he was named to the first team squad for the first time during March 2018 against Wolfsberger AC. He made his professional debut in the Bundesliga in the same month when he came on as a substitute for Christoph Monschein in the 73rd minute on matchday 28 of the 2017–18 season against SCR Altach. On 27 May 2018, Fitz scored his first Austrian Bundesliga goal in a 4–0 win against FC Red Bull Salzburg.

During the 2019–20 season, Fitz became a regular starter for Austria Wien. In his first full season with the first team, Fitz appeared in 29 matches and scored four goals. The following season he appeared in 29 matches and scored 7 goals. During the 2021–22 season Fitz saw less playing time due to injury. He appeared in 18 matches and scored three goals. On 29 July 2021, he scored his first international goal for Austria Wien in a 2–1 loss to Breiðablik in the UEFA Conference League. In March 2022, he extended his contract with Austria Wien until June 2026.

Over the next several seasons Fitz emerged as one of the top play-makers in Austria. On 30 October 2022, Fitz scored two goals in a 2–1 victory over Altach, including a 93rd-minute winner from the penalty spot. He ended the 2022–23 season appearing in 38 matches and scoring 10 goals. He followed that up with 12 goals in 37 matches during the 2023–24 season. Through 15 matches in the 2024–25 season Fitz led the Austrian Bundesliga with nine assists to add to his three goals.

=== Minnesota United ===
On 21 August 2025, Fitz signed a four-and-a-half year deal with Major League Soccer side Minnesota United.

=== Wolfsberger AC ===
On 27 August 2026, Fitz joined Wolfsberger AC on loan for the 2026–27 season, returning to Austria.

== International career ==
Fitz was selected to participate in the European Under-17 Championship in 2016 with the Austria under-17 team. Without being a starter, he took part in each of his teams matches, which reached the quarter-finals, beaten by the future winner of the competition, Portugal.

Fitz also represented the under-18s between 2016 and 2017. In total he made six appearances with this group.

On 11 October 2019, Fitz played his first match with the Austria under-21 Team, against Turkey. He came on in place of Christoph Baumgartner, in a 3–0 Austria victory.

== Career statistics ==
As of match played 21 August 2025

| Club | Season | League | | | National cup (Note: Includes Austrian Cup) | | Continental | | Total | |
| Club | Season | Division | Apps | Goals | Apps | Goals | Apps | Goals | Apps | Goals |
|---|---|---|---|---|---|---|---|---|---|---|
| Austria Wien II | 2015–16 | Austrian Regionalliga | 10 | 3 | — | | — | | 10 | 3 |
| Austria Wien II | 2016–17 | Austrian Regionalliga | 24 | 6 | — | | — | | 24 | 6 |
| Austria Wien II | 2017–18 | Austrian Regionalliga | 22 | 9 | — | | — | | 22 | 9 |
| Austria Wien II | 2018–19 | 2. Liga | 18 | 8 | — | | — | | 18 | 8 |
| Austria Wien II | 2020–21 | 2. Liga | 1 | 0 | — | | — | | 1 | 0 |
| Austria Wien II | 2021–22 | 2. Liga | 6 | 1 | — | | — | | 6 | 1 |
| Austria Wien II | Total | | 81 | 27 | – | | – | | 81 | 27 |
| Austria Wien | 2017–18 | Austrian Bundesliga | 7 | 1 | — | | — | | 7 | 1 |
| Austria Wien | 2018–19 | Austrian Bundesliga | 2 | 0 | 0 | 0 | — | | 2 | 0 |
| Austria Wien | 2019–20 | Austrian Bundesliga | 25 | 4 | 2 | 0 | 2 (Note: Appearances in UEFA Europa League) | 0 | 29 | 4 |
| Austria Wien | 2020–21 | Austrian Bundesliga | 27 | 6 | 2 | 1 | — | | 29 | 7 |
| Austria Wien | 2021–22 | Austrian Bundesliga | 14 | 2 | 2 | 0 | 2 (Note: Appearances in UEFA Europa Conference League) | 1 | 18 | 3 |
| Austria Wien | 2022–23 | Austrian Bundesliga | 28 | 8 | 2 | 2 | 8 (Note: Two appearances in UEFA Europa League, six appearances in UEFA Europa Conference League) | 0 | 38 | 10 |
| Austria Wien | 2023–24 | Austrian Bundesliga | 30 | 10 | 3 | 2 | 4 | 0 | 37 | 12 |
| Austria Wien | 2024–25 | Austrian Bundesliga | 30 | 12 | 4 | 1 | 2 | 0 | 36 | 13 |
| Austria Wien | 2025–26 | Austrian Bundesliga | 3 | 1 | 1 | 0 | 4 | 3 | 8 | 4 |
| Austria Wien | Total | | 166 | 44 | 16 | 6 | 22 | 4 | 204 | 54 |
| Minnesota United | 2025 | MLS | 0 | 0 | — | | — | | 0 | 0 |
| Career total | | | 247 | 71 | 16 | 6 | 22 | 4 | 285 | 81 |
