= Ziad El Sheiwi =

Austrian footballer (born 2004)

Personal information
- Date of birth: 11 March 2004 (age 22)
- Place of birth: Vienna, Austria
- Height: 1.77 m (5 ft 10 in)
- Position: Left-back

Youth career
- 2010–2011: Team Wiener Linien
- 2011–2021: Austria Wien

Senior career*
Years	Team	Apps	(Gls)
2021–2022	Austria Wien II	9	(0)
2021–2026	Austria Wien	7	(0)
Total		16	(0)

International career
2020	Austria U17	1	(0)
2021	Austria U18	6	(0)
- * Club domestic league appearances and goals

Ziad El Sheiwi (Arabic: زياد الشيوي; born 11 March 2004) is an Austrian former professional footballer who played as a left-back.

== Club career ==
A former youth academy player of Team Wiener Linien, El Sheiwi moved to Austria Wien in 2011. He signed his first professional contract with the club in July 2021. He made his professional debut for club's reserve side on 23 July 2021 in a 1–1 draw against Wacker Innsbruck. On 6 December 2021, he suffered a cruciate ligament tear that was scheduled to keep him out for 8 months. On 13 June 2022, he extended his contract with the club until 2026 despite suffering a cruciate ligament tear that summer. On 11 September 2022, he again tore his cruciate ligament after a comeback game against TSV Hartberg.

El Sheiwi retired from football on 16 May 2026, after 5 cruciate ligament tears, and 8 operations overall.

== International career ==
Born in Austria, El Sheiwi is of Egyptian descent. He has represented Austria at youth international level. On 8 October 2020, he made his debut for the Austria under-17 team in a 1–0 friendly win against Slovenia.

== Career statistics ==
Appearances and goals by club, season and competition
Club	Season	League			Cup		Continental		Total	
Club	Season	Division	Apps	Goals	Apps	Goals	Apps	Goals	Apps	Goals
Austria Wien II	2021–22	2. Liga	8	0	—		—		8	0
Austria Wien II	2022–23	2. Liga	1	0	—		—		1	0
Austria Wien II	Total		9	0	0	0	0	0	9	0
Austria Wien	2021–22	Austrian Bundesliga	6	0	0	0	0	0	6	0
Austria Wien	2022–23	Austrian Bundesliga	1	0	0	0	0	0	1	0
Austria Wien	2023–24	Austrian Bundesliga	0	0	0	0	0	0	0	0
Austria Wien	2024–25	Austrian Bundesliga	0	0	0	0	0	0	0	0
Austria Wien	2025–26	Austrian Bundesliga	0	0	0	0	0	0	0	0
Austria Wien	Total		7	0	0	0	0	0	7	0
Career total			16	0	0	0	0	0	16	0
