= Pirkl =

Pirkl is a surname. Notable people with the surname include:

- Greg Pirkl (born 1970), American baseball player
- Simon Pirkl (born 1997), Austrian footballer
