= Cristiano (footballer, born 2001) =

Brazilian footballer

Personal information
- Full name: Cristiano Robert do Amaral
- Date of birth: 31 August 2001 (age 25)
- Place of birth: Sorocaba, Brazil
- Height: 1.76 m (5 ft 9 in)
- Position: Forward

Youth career
- Elosport
- 2018–2021: São Bento
- 2020–2021: → Coritiba (loan)
- 2021: → Sport Recife (loan)

Senior career*
Years	Team	Apps	(Gls)
2020–2024	São Bento	15	(4)
2020–2021	→ Coritiba (loan)	2	(0)
2021–2022	→ Sport Recife (loan)	13	(1)
2023	→ Patrocinense (loan)	9	(1)
2023	→ ASA (loan)	14	(1)
2024	→ Austria Wien (loan)	6	(0)
2025–2026	São José-SP	25	(1)
2025	→ Guarani (loan)	5	(0)
2025	→ Porto Vitória (loan)	2	(0)
2026	→ Noroeste (loan)	4	(0)
- * Club domestic league appearances and goals as of 23:56, 15 August 2026 (UTC)

Cristiano Robert do Amaral (born 31 August 2001), simply known as Cristiano, is a Brazilian footballer who plays as a forward.

== Career ==
Born in Sorocaba, São Paulo, Cristiano played for hometown São Bento for the most of his youth career, before moving to Coritiba on loan in 2020. After playing for the under-20 and under-23 squads, he made his first team – and Série A – debut on 20 February 2021, coming on as a second-half substitute for Mattheus Oliveira in a 2–0 home loss to Ceará.

Back to São Bento in April 2021, Cristiano was loaned to Sport Recife in June, initially for the under-20s. He then played in nine top tier matches as the club suffered relegation, and had his loan extended on 2 February 2022.

On 11 January 2023, Cristiano was announced at Patrocinense, still owned by São Bento. He moved to ASA also in a temporary deal on 26 April, before returning to his parent club on 11 August, now as a first team member.

On 8 March 2024, Cristiano signed a new one-year deal with Bentão, but was loaned to Austrian Bundesliga side Austria Wien on 11 April. On 8 January of the following year, he was announced at São José-SP.

On 9 April 2025, Cristiano was loaned to Guarani, but had his loan cut short on 22 June, and moved to Porto Vitória. Back to São José for the 2026 season, he was loaned to Noroeste until the end of the Série D on 22 April of that year.

Upon returning to São José, Cristiano was included in the squad for the 2026 Copa Paulista, but was released by the club on 28 August, after playing in an amateur tournament.

== Career statistics ==
As of 31 August 2026

Club	Season	League			State League		Cup		Continental		Other		Total	
Club	Season	Division	Apps	Goals	Apps	Goals	Apps	Goals	Apps	Goals	Apps	Goals	Apps	Goals
Coritiba	2020	Série A	2	0	—		—		—		—		2	0
Sport Recife	2021	Série A	9	0	—		—		—		—		9	0
Sport Recife	2022	Série B	0	0	4	1	0	0	—		1 (Note: Appearance(s) in Copa do Nordeste)	0	5	1
Sport Recife	Total		9	0	4	1	0	0	—		1	0	14	1
Patrocinense	2023	Série D	—		9	1	—		—		—		9	1
ASA	2023	Série D	14	1	—		—		—		—		14	1
São Bento	2023	Paulista	—		—		—		—		4 (Note: Appearance(s) in Copa Paulista)	1	4	1
São Bento	2024	Paulista A2	—		15	4	—		—		—		15	4
São Bento	Total		—		15	4	—		—		4	1	19	5
Austria Wien	2024–25	Austrian Bundesliga	6	0	—		2	0	0	0	—		8	0
São José-SP	2025	Paulista A2	—		16	1	—		—		7	0	23	1
São José-SP	2026	Paulista A2	—		9	0	—		—		2	0	11	0
São José-SP	Total		—		25	1	—		—		9	0	34	1
Guarani (loan)	2025	Série C	5	0	—		—		—		—		5	0
Porto Vitória (loan)	2025	Série D	2	0	—		—		—		1 (Note: Appearance(s) in Copa Espírito Santo)	0	3	0
Noroeste (loan)	2026	Série D	4	0	—		—		—		—		4	0
Career total			42	1	53	6	2	0	0	0	15	1	112	8
