= Reinhold Ranftl =

Austrian footballer

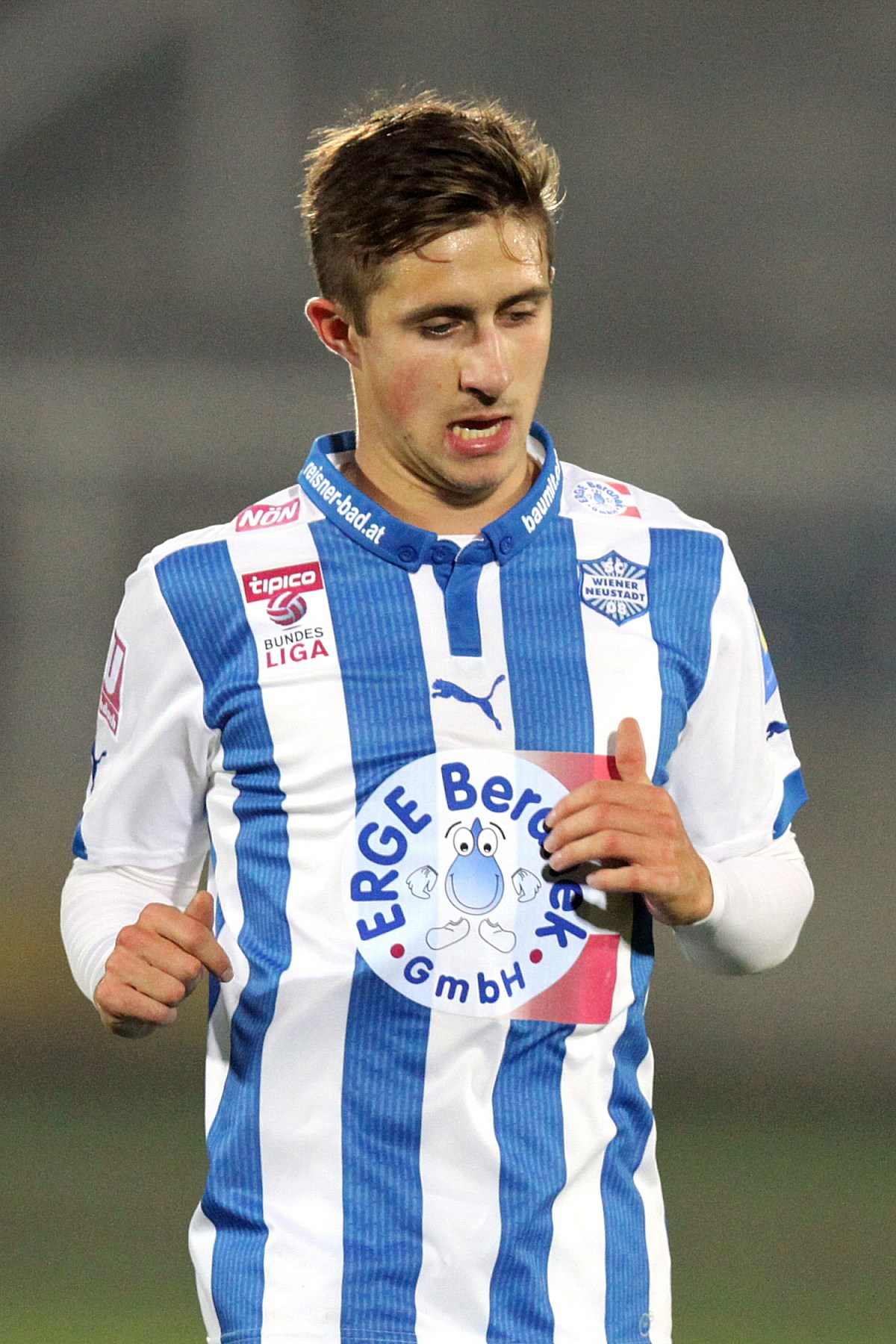
- Ranftl with Wiener Neustadt in 2014

Personal information
- Date of birth: 24 January 1992 (age 34)
- Place of birth: Kapfenstein, Austria
- Height: 1.80 m (5 ft 11 in)
- Position: Right midfielder

Team information
- Current team: Austria Wien
- Number: 26

Youth career
- 1999–2005: SVU Kapfenstein
- 2005–2008: UFC Fehring

Senior career*
Years	Team	Apps	(Gls)
2008–2010	UFC Fehring	46	(2)
2010–2014	Sturm Graz II	89	(13)
2013–2014	Sturm Graz	6	(0)
2014	Hartberg	17	(0)
2014–2015	Wiener Neustadt	30	(5)
2015–2021	LASK	188	(18)
2021–2023	Schalke 04	15	(0)
2022–2023	→ Austria Wien (loan)	31	(4)
2023–	Austria Wien	94	(6)

International career^{‡}
2008	Austria U17	1	(0)
2019–	Austria	6	(0)
- * Club domestic league appearances and goals as of 10 June 2026 ‡ National team caps and goals as of 9 June 2021

Reinhold Ranftl (born 24 January 1992) is an Austrian professional footballer who plays as a right midfielder for Austrian Bundesliga club Austria Wien. He also played for the Austria national team.

== Club career ==
In June 2021, Schalke 04, newly relegated to the 2. Bundesliga, announced the signing of Ranftl from LASK on a three-year contract. In June 2022, he agreed to join Austria Wien on loan for the 2022–23 season with an option to make the move permanent. In June 2023, he completed the permanent move.

== International career ==
Ranftl made his debut for Austria national team on 19 November 2019 in a Euro 2020 qualifier against Latvia. He substituted Stefan Ilsanker in the 77th minute.

== Career statistics ==
=== Club ===
As of match played 18 August 2024

Appearances and goals by club, season and competition
Club	Season	League			Cup		Europe		Other		Total	
Club	Season	Division	Apps	Goals	Apps	Goals	Apps	Goals	Apps	Goals	Apps	Goals
Sturm Graz II	2010–11	Austrian Regionalliga	29	7	2	1	—		—		31	8
Sturm Graz II	2011–12	Austrian Regionalliga	27	2	2	1	—		—		29	3
Sturm Graz II	2012–13	Austrian Regionalliga	23	4	0	0	—		—		23	4
Sturm Graz II	2013–14	Austrian Regionalliga	10	0	0	0	—		—		10	0
Sturm Graz II	Total		89	13	4	2	—		—		93	15
Sturm Graz	2012–13	Austrian Bundesliga	4	0	0	0	—		—		4	0
Sturm Graz	2013–14	Austrian Bundesliga	2	0	1	0	—		—		3	0
Sturm Graz	Total		6	0	1	0	—		—		7	0
Hartberg	2013–14	Austrian 2. Liga	17	0	—		—		—		17	0
Wiener Neustadt	2014–15	Austrian Bundesliga	30	5	3	1	—		—		33	6
LASK	2015–16	Austrian 2. Liga	30	1	4	0	—		—		34	1
LASK	2016–17	Austrian 2. Liga	33	5	4	0	—		—		37	5
LASK	2017–18	Austrian Bundesliga	35	1	3	0	—		—		38	1
LASK	2018–19	Austrian Bundesliga	30	2	5	0	4	0	—		39	2
LASK	2019–20	Austrian Bundesliga	28	5	5	0	14	2	—		47	7
LASK	2020–21	Austrian Bundesliga	32	4	6	0	8	0	—		46	4
LASK	Total		188	18	27	0	26	2	—		241	20
Schalke 04	2021–22	2. Bundesliga	15	0	1	0	—		—		16	0
Austria Wien (loan)	2022–23	Austrian Bundesliga	31	4	3	0	8	0	2 (Note: Appearances in Austrian Bundesliga Europa Conference League play-offs.)	0	44	4
Austria Wien	2023–24	Austrian Bundesliga	31	1	4	1	4	1	1	0	40	3
Austria Wien	2024–25	Austrian Bundesliga	3	0	1	0	2	0	—		6	0
Austria Wien	Total		65	5	8	1	14	1	3	0	90	7
Career total			410	41	44	4	40	3	3	0	497	48

=== International ===
As of match played 18 November 2020

Appearances and goals by national team and year
National team	Year	Apps	Goals
Austria
Austria	2019	1	0
Austria	2020	5	0
Total		6	0

== Honours ==
LASK

- Austrian 2. Liga: 2016–17

Schalke 04

- 2. Bundesliga: 2021–22
