= Abubakr Barry =

Gambian footballer (born 2000)

- Barry in 2026

Personal information
- Date of birth: 2 July 2000 (age 26)
- Place of birth: Banjul, The Gambia
- Height: 1.90 m (6 ft 3 in)
- Position: Midfielder

Team information
- Current team: Red Bull Salzburg
- Number: 32

Youth career
- Superstars Academy
- 2018–2019: Maccabi Haifa

Senior career*
Years	Team	Apps	(Gls)
2019–2020	Hapoel Nof HaGalil	7	(1)
2020–2021	Hapoel Kfar Shalem	24	(1)
2021–2022	Hapoel Nir Ramat HaSharon	30	(3)
2022–2023	Hapoel Kfar Saba	31	(0)
2023–2024	Bnei Yehuda	32	(9)
2024–2026	Austria Wien	58	(5)
2026–	Red Bull Salzburg	10	(0)

International career^{‡}
2024–	Gambia	11	(0)
- * Club domestic league appearances and goals as of 19:16, 25 October 2026 (UTC) ‡ National team caps and goals as of 22:06, 29 September 2026 (UTC)

Abubakr Barry (born 2 July 2000) is a Gambian professional footballer who plays as a midfielder for Austrian Bundesliga club Red Bull Salzburg and the Gambia national team.

== Career ==
A youth product of the Gambian club Superstars Academy, Barry moved to Israel in 2018 with Maccabi Haifa where he finished his development. From 2019 to 2024, he played for various Israeli clubs in the Liga Leumit, with successive spells at Hapoel Nof HaGalil, Hapoel Kfar Shalem, Hapoel Nir Ramat HaSharon, Hapoel Kfar Saba, and Bnei Yehuda. In his last season in Israel for 2023–24, he scored nine goals and had four assists in 32 league matches. On 29 July 2024, he transferred to the Austrian Football Bundesliga club Austria Wien on a two-year contract.

=== Red Bull Salzburg ===
On 29 June 2026, Barry completed a permanent transfer to Austrian Bundesliga club Red Bull Salzburg, signing a three-year contract running until 2029. The deal was valued at approximately €3 million, with an additional €250,000 in performance-related bonuses.

== International career ==
Barry was called up to the Gambia national team for a set of 2025 Africa Cup of Nations qualification matches in March 2025.

== Personal life ==
Barry is the brother of Hamza Barry who is also a professional footballer.

== Career statistics ==
=== Club ===
As of match played 25 October 2026

Appearances and goals by club, season and competition
Club	Season	League			Cup		Europe		Other		Total	
Club	Season	Division	Apps	Goals	Apps	Goals	Apps	Goals	Apps	Goals	Apps	Goals
Hapoel Nof HaGalil	2019–20	Liga Leumit	7	1	2	0	—		—		9	1
Hapoel Kfar Shalem	2020–21	Liga Leumit	24	1	3	0	—		—		27	1
Hapoel Nir Ramat HaSharon	2021–22	Liga Leumit	30	3	—		—		—		30	3
Hapoel Kfar Saba	2022–23	Liga Leumit	31	0	2	0	—		—		33	0
Bnei Yehuda	2023–24	Liga Leumit	32	9	1	0	—		—		33	9
Austria Wien	2024–25	Austrian Bundesliga	30	1	5	0	2 (Note: Appearances in UEFA Conference League)	1	—		37	2
Austria Wien	2025–26	Austrian Bundesliga	28	4	1	0	4	0	—		33	4
Austria Wien	Total		58	5	6	0	6	1	—		70	6
Red Bull Salzburg	2026–27	Austrian Bundesliga	10	0	1	0	7 (Note: Appearances in UEFA Europa League)	0	—		18	0
Career total			192	19	15	0	13	1	0	0	220	20

=== International ===
As of match played 29 September 2026

Appearances and goals by national team and year
National team	Year	Apps	Goals
Gambia	2024	2	0
Gambia	2025	6	0
Gambia	2026	3	0
Total		11	0
