= Muharem Husković =

Austrian footballer (born 2003)

Personal information
- Date of birth: 5 March 2003 (age 23)
- Place of birth: Vienna, Austria
- Height: 1.80 m (5 ft 11 in)
- Position: Forward

Team information
- Current team: Željezničar
- Number: 29

Youth career
- 2009–2016: Kremser SC
- 2016–2020: Austria Wien

Senior career*
Years	Team	Apps	(Gls)
2020–2026	Austria Wien	56	(7)
2020–2022	→ Young Violets (loan)	37	(9)
2025	→ TSV Hartberg (loan)	13	(3)
2025–2026	→ Blau-Weiß Linz (loan)	11	(0)
2026–	Željezničar	18	(3)

International career
2019	Austria U17	6	(1)
2021–2022	Austria U19	7	(2)
2021–2024	Austria U21	9	(0)
- * Club domestic league appearances and goals as of 21 November 2026

Muharem Husković (pronounced [muxâːrem xǔskoʋitɕ]; born 5 March 2003) is an Austrian professional footballer who plays as a forward for Bosnian Premier League club Željezničar.

Husković started his professional career at Austria Wien, who assigned him to Young Violets in 2020. He was then loaned out to TSV Hartberg and Blau-Weiß Linz, in 2025. He signed with Bosnian club Željezničar in 2026.

== Club career ==
=== Austria Wien ===
Husković started playing football at Kremser SC, before joining the youth academy of his hometown team Austria Wien in 2016. He made his professional debut playing for Austria Wien's feeder squad, Young Violets, against Liefering on 14 June 2020 at the age of 17. On 24 June, he scored his first professional goal against Vorwärts Steyr. In September, he signed his first professional contract with the club.

Husković scored his first career hat-trick in a triumph over Juniors OÖ on 17 July. In January 2022, he extended his contract with Austria Wien until June 2025.

In October 2022, Husković suffered a severe knee injury in a car crash, which was diagnosed as an anterior cruciate ligament tear and was ruled out for at least six months. He returned to the pitch on 9 July 2023, over nine months after the injury and managed to score a goal.

==== Loan spells ====
On 20 January 2025, Husković moved on loan to TSV Hartberg until the end of the season. In July 2025, he joined Blau-Weiß Linz on a loan deal.

=== Željezničar ===
On 3 February 2026, Husković left Austria Wien and signed a two-and-a-half-year contract with Bosnian Premier League side Željezničar. He debuted in a Bosnian Cup game against Sloga Doboj on 25 February, coming on as a substitute. He scored his first goal for Željezničar in a league game against BSK Banja Luka on 7 August 2026, which Željezničar won 2–1.

== International career ==
Husković represented Austria at various youth levels. He is also eligible to represent Bosnia and Herzegovina via his parents.

== Career statistics ==
=== Club ===
As of match played 21 November 2026

Appearances and goals by club, season and competition
Club	Season	League			Cup		Continental		Total	
Club	Season	Division	Apps	Goals	Apps	Goals	Apps	Goals	Apps	Goals
Young Violets (loan)	2019–20	2. Liga	9	5	–		–		9	5
Young Violets (loan)	2020–21	2. Liga	24	4	–		–		24	4
Young Violets (loan)	2021–22	2. Liga	4	0	–		–		4	0
Young Violets (loan)	Total		37	9	–		–		37	9
Austria Wien	2020–21	Austrian Bundesliga	1	0	0	0	–		1	0
Austria Wien	2021–22	Austrian Bundesliga	14	2	1	0	0	0	15	2
Austria Wien	2022–23	Austrian Bundesliga	8	1	1	0	4 (Note: One appearance in UEFA Europa League, three appearances in UEFA Conference League)	0	13	1
Austria Wien	2023–24	Austrian Bundesliga	27	3	3	1	4 (Note: Appearances in UEFA Conference League)	2	34	6
Austria Wien	2024–25	Austrian Bundesliga	6	1	2	2	2	0	10	3
Austria Wien	Total		56	7	7	3	10	2	73	12
TSV Hartberg (loan)	2024–25	Austrian Bundesliga	13	3	2	0	–		15	3
Blau-Weiß Linz (loan)	2025–26	Austrian Bundesliga	11	0	3	0	–		14	0
Željezničar	2025–26	Bosnian Premier League	5	0	2	0	–		7	0
Željezničar	2026–27	Bosnian Premier League	13	3	1	0	–		14	3
Željezničar	Total		18	3	3	0	–		21	3
Career total			135	22	15	3	10	2	160	27
