= Andreas Gruber (footballer) =

Austrian footballer

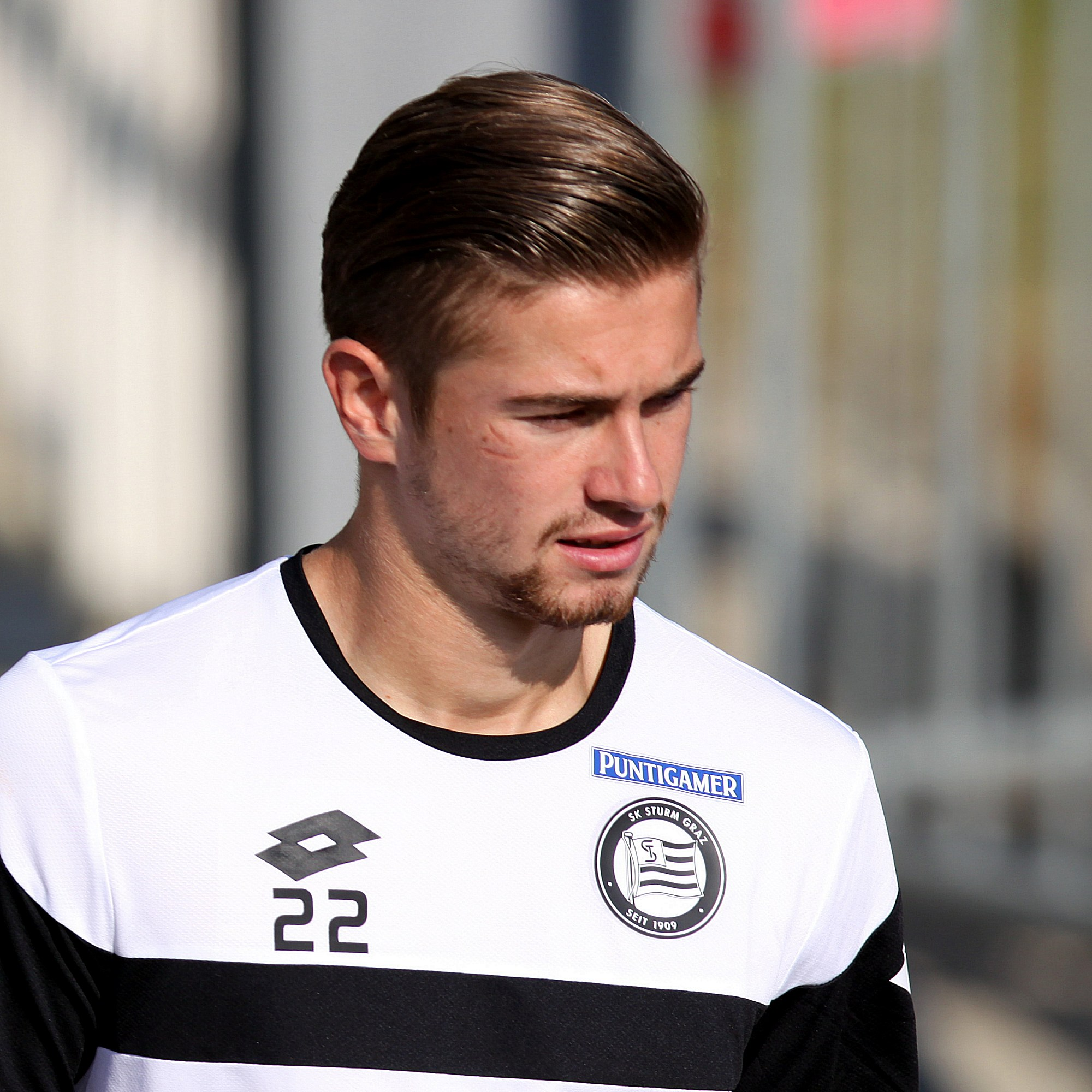
- Gruber with SK Sturm Graz in 2015

Personal information
- Full name: Andreas Gruber
- Date of birth: 29 June 1995 (age 31)
- Place of birth: Mürzzuschlag, Austria
- Height: 1.74 m (5 ft 9 in)
- Position: Winger

Team information
- Current team: Dunajská Streda
- Number: 9

Youth career
- –2012: Sturm Graz

Senior career*
| Years | Team | Apps | (Gls) |
| 2012–2017 | SK Sturm Graz II | 58 | (19) |
| 2014–2017 | Sturm Graz | 58 | (5) |
| 2017–2020 | Mattersburg | 78 | (22) |
| 2020–2022 | LASK | 31 | (5) |
| 2022–2025 | Austria Wien | 89 | (25) |
| 2025– | Dunajská Streda | 31 | (2) |

International career
| 2015–2016 | Austria U21 | 4 | (0) |
- * Club domestic league appearances and goals as of 21 September 2026

Andreas Gruber (born 29 June 1995) is an Austrian professional footballer who plays as a winger for Slovak First Football League side Dunajská Streda.

== Career ==
Gruber made his league debut in a 1–1 home draw against Austria Wien by coming on as a substitute for Daniel Beichler after 81 minutes.

== International career ==
Gruber has been capped at youth level for Austria.

== Career statistics ==
As of match played 9 December 2023

Appearances and goals by club, season and competition
| Club | Season | League | | | Austrian Cup | | Europe | | Total | |
| Club | Season | Division | Apps | Goals | Apps | Goals | Apps | Goals | Apps | Goals |
|---|---|---|---|---|---|---|---|---|---|---|
| Sturm Graz | 2014–15 | Austrian Bundesliga | 24 | 2 | 3 | 0 | — | | 27 | 2 |
| Sturm Graz | 2015–16 | Austrian Bundesliga | 29 | 3 | 3 | 1 | 1 | 0 | 33 | 4 |
| Sturm Graz | 2016–17 | Austrian Bundesliga | 5 | 0 | 0 | 0 | — | | 5 | 0 |
| Sturm Graz | Total | | 58 | 5 | 6 | 1 | 1 | 0 | 65 | 6 |
| Mattersburg | 2017–18 | Austrian Bundesliga | 27 | 4 | 3 | 1 | — | | 30 | 5 |
| Mattersburg | 2018–19 | Austrian Bundesliga | 31 | 6 | 2 | 0 | — | | 33 | 6 |
| Mattersburg | 2019–20 | Austrian Bundesliga | 20 | 12 | 2 | 0 | — | | 22 | 12 |
| Mattersburg | Total | | 78 | 22 | 7 | 1 | — | | 85 | 23 |
| LASK | 2020–21 | Austrian Bundesliga | 17 | 5 | 4 | 2 | 8 (Note: Appearances in UEFA Europa League) | 3 | 29 | 10 |
| LASK | 2021–22 | Austrian Bundesliga | 14 | 0 | 2 | 0 | 5 (Note: Appearances in UEFA Europa Conference League) | 2 | 21 | 2 |
| LASK | Total | | 31 | 5 | 6 | 2 | 13 | 5 | 50 | 12 |
| Austria Wien | 2022–23 | Austrian Bundesliga | 26 | 9 | 3 | 2 | 4 (Note: Two appearances in UEFA Europa League, two appearances in UEFA Europa Conference League) | 0 | 33 | 11 |
| Austria Wien | 2023–24 | Austrian Bundesliga | 17 | 8 | 3 | 1 | — | | 20 | 9 |
| Austria Wien | Total | | 43 | 17 | 6 | 3 | 4 | 0 | 53 | 20 |
| Career total | | | 210 | 49 | 25 | 7 | 18 | 5 | 253 | 61 |
