= Christoph Monschein =

Austrian footballer

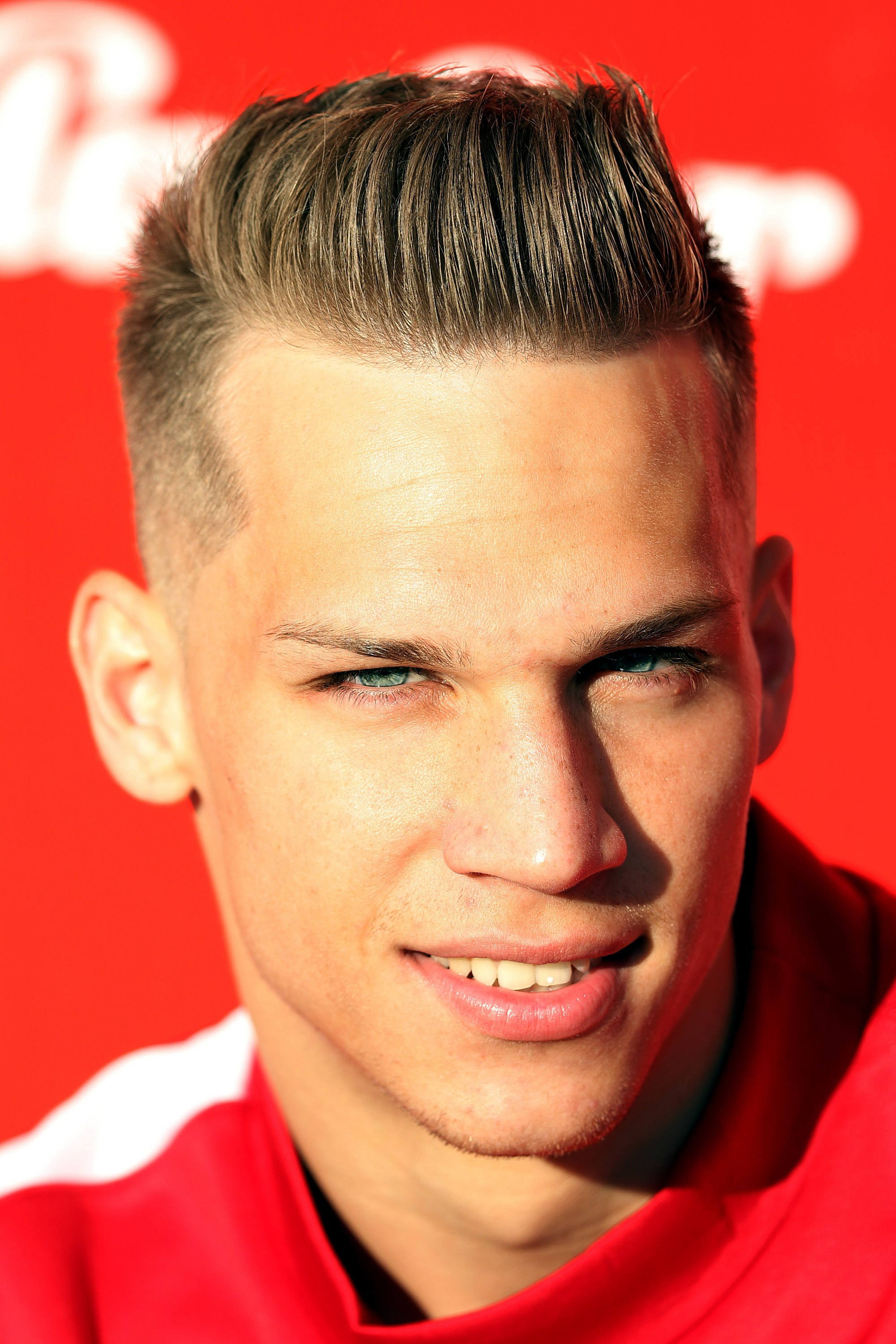
- Monschein in 2016

Personal information
- Date of birth: 22 October 1992 (age 34)
- Place of birth: Brunn am Gebirge, Austria
- Height: 1.78 m (5 ft 10 in)
- Position: Striker

Team information
- Current team: First Vienna
- Number: 7

Youth career
- 1998–2009: SC Brunn am Gebirge

Senior career*
Years	Team	Apps	(Gls)
2009–2014	SC Brunn am Gebirge	117	(42)
2014–2016	ASK Ebreichsdorf	45	(35)
2016–2017	Admira Wacker	39	(12)
2017–2021	Austria Wien	121	(37)
2021–2022	LASK	6	(1)
2022	→ Rheindorf Altach (loan)	14	(3)
2022–2023	SV Ried	25	(3)
2023–	First Vienna	47	(13)

International career
2020–	Austria	1	(0)
- * Club domestic league appearances and goals as of 17 May 2026

Christoph Monschein (born 22 October 1992) is an Austrian professional footballer who plays as a forward for First Vienna.

== Club career ==
=== Early years ===
Monschein began his footballing career with hometown club SC Brunn am Gebirge. In 2014, he moved to ASK Ebreichsdorf. In January 2016 he joined his first professional club Admira Wacker Mödling. He made his Austrian Football Bundesliga debut on 7 February 2016 in a 2–1 loss to Red Bull Salzburg, when he came off the bench in closing stages for Lukas Grozurek.

=== Austria Wien ===
On 1 July 2017, Monschein joined Austria Wien for a reported fee of €600,000. He signed a three-year contract. During his time in Vienna he made 116 Bundesliga appearances, scoring 36 goals.

=== LASK ===
In the summer of 2021, he joined LASK on a three-year contract.

On 27 January 2022, Monschein was loaned to Rheindorf Altach until the end of the season.

=== SV Ried ===
Monschein joined SV Ried on 13 June 2022, signing a two-year contract with an option for an additional year.

=== First Vienna ===
In summer 2023, Monschein signed with First Vienna FC, on a two-year contract.

== International career ==
In August 2020, Monschein was called up for the Austria national team for the first time by national team coach Franco Foda. He made his debut in September 2020 when he came on as a substitute in the 81st minute for Florian Grillitsch in a UEFA Nations League against Romania.

== Career statistics ==
As of match played 27 May 2023

Appearances and goals by club, season and competition
Club	Season	League			Cup		Continental		Other		Total	
Club	Season	Division	Apps	Goals	Apps	Goals	Apps	Goals	Apps	Goals	Apps	Goals
ASK Ebreichsdorf	2015–16	Austrian Regionalliga East	16	8	2	1	—		—		18	9
Admira Wacker	2015–16	Austrian Bundesliga	11	2	2	0	—		—		13	2
Admira Wacker	2016–17	Austrian Bundesliga	28	10	5	6	3 (Note: Appearances in the UEFA Europa League)	0	—		36	16
Admira Wacker	Total		39	12	7	6	3	0	—		49	18
Austria Wien	2017–18	Austrian Bundesliga	32	7	3	0	10	4	—		45	11
Austria Wien	2018–19	Austrian Bundesliga	28	7	3	2	—		—		31	9
Austria Wien	2019–20	Austrian Bundesliga	35	17	2	3	2	0	—		39	20
Austria Wien	2020–21	Austrian Bundesliga	24	5	3	2	—		2 (Note: Appearances in the Bundesliga Playoff for spot in the UEFA Europa Conference League)	1	29	8
Austria Wien	Total		119	36	11	7	12	4	2	1	144	48
LASK	2021–22	Austrian Bundesliga	6	1	3	0	4 (Note: Appearances in the UEFA Europa Conference League)	1	—		13	2
Rheindorf Altach (loan)	2021–22	Austrian Bundesliga	14	3	0	0	—		—		14	3
SV Ried	2022–23	Austrian Bundesliga	25	3	5	3	—		—		30	6
Career Total			219	63	28	17	19	5	2	1	268	86
