= Matteo Meisl =

Austrian association footballer

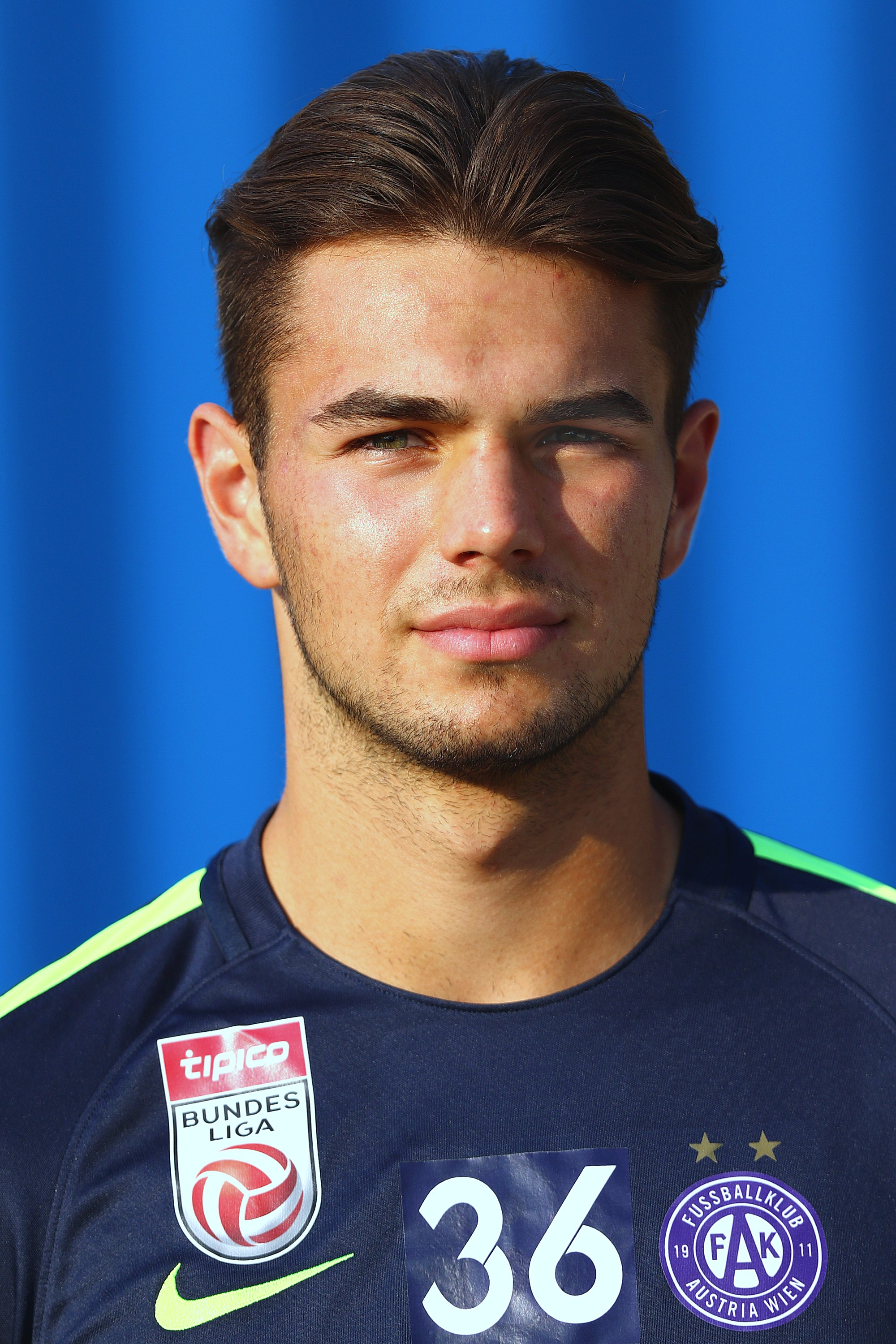
- Meisl in 2018

Personal information
- Full name: Matteo Raphael Meisl
- Date of birth: 27 December 2000 (age 25)
- Place of birth: Salzburg, Austria
- Height: 1.83 m (6 ft 0 in)
- Position: Centre-back

Team information
- Current team: Admira Wacker
- Number: 5

Youth career
- 2008–2013: SV Kuchl
- 2013–2017: Red Bull Salzburg
- 2017–2018: FC Liefering

Senior career*
Years	Team	Apps	(Gls)
2018–2023	Austria Wien II	79	(1)
2022–2025	Austria Wien	38	(1)
2025	→ SV Stripfing (loan)	14	(1)
2025–	Admira Wacker	27	(3)

International career^{‡}
2014–2015	Austria U15	4	(0)
2015–2016	Austria U16	7	(1)
2016–2017	Austria U17	6	(0)
2017–2018	Austria U18	6	(0)
2018	Austria U19	1	(0)
- * Club domestic league appearances and goals as of 17 May 2026 ‡ National team caps and goals as of 20:57, 26 May 2023 (UTC)

Matteo Raphael Meisl (born 27 December 2000) is an Austrian professional footballer who plays as a centre-back for Admira Wacker.

== Career ==
Meisl is a youth product of the academies of SV Kuchl, Red Bull Salzburg and FC Liefering. He moved to Austria Wien in 2018, where he was initially assigned to their reserves. He made his professional debut with them in a 3–0 Austrian Football Bundesliga win over SV Ried on 18 September 2022. On 9 January 2023, he extended his contract with Austria Wien until 2026.

On 23 June 2025, Meisl signed a contract with Admira Wacker.

== International career ==
Meisl is a youth international for Austria, having played up to the Austria U19s.

== Personal life ==
Meisl's older brother Luca is also a professional footballer.
