= Lucas Galvão =

Brazilian footballer

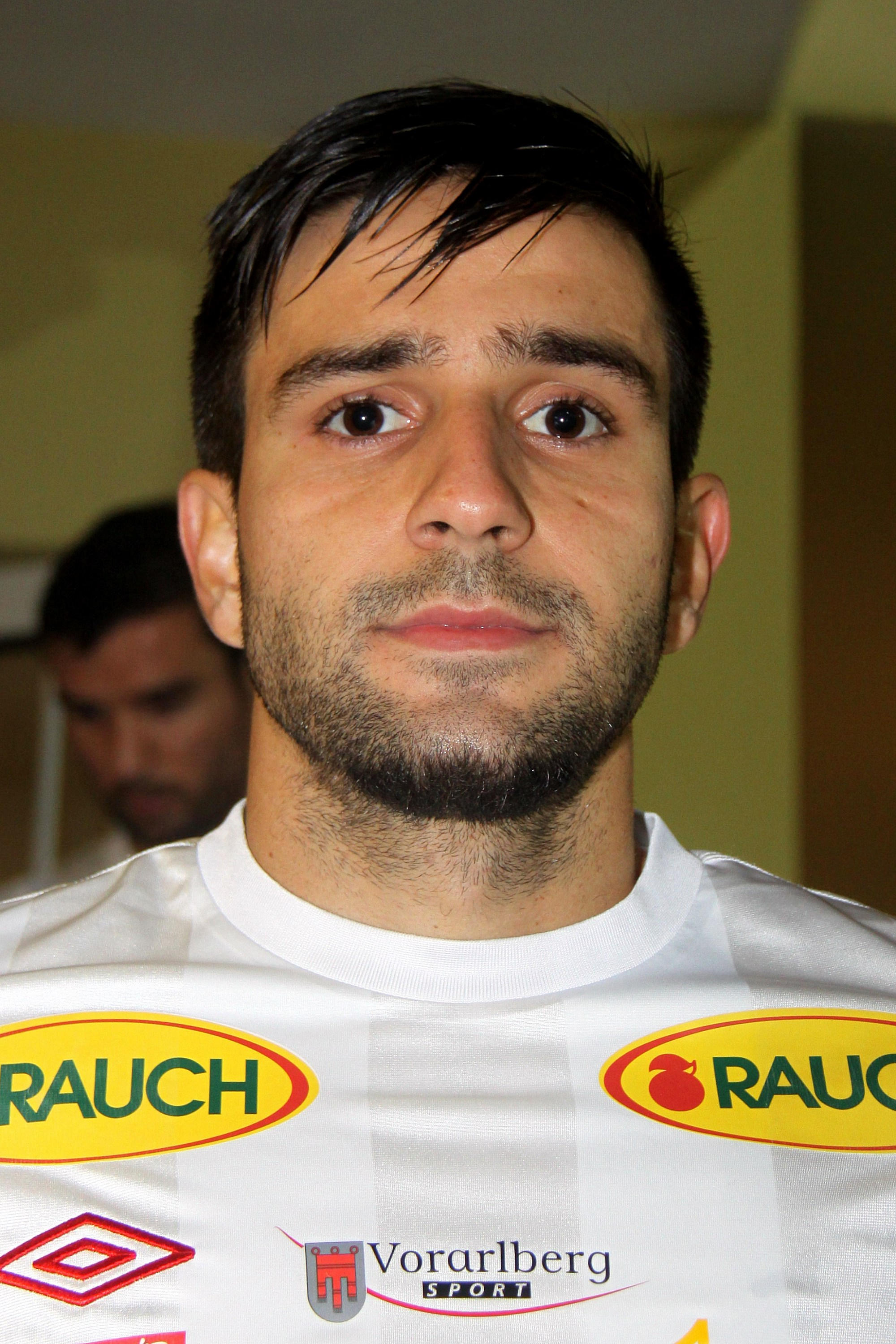
- Lucas Galvão in 2013

Personal information
- Full name: Lucas Galvão da Costa Souza
- Date of birth: 22 June 1991 (age 35)
- Place of birth: São José do Rio Preto, Brazil
- Height: 1.81 m (5 ft 11 in)
- Position: Centre-back

Team information
- Current team: Hatta
- Number: 3

Senior career*
| Years | Team | Apps | (Gls) |
| 2009–2013 | Ponte Preta | 8 | (0) |
| 2011 | → XV de Novembro (loan) | 1 | (0) |
| 2011 | → Red Bull Brasil (loan) | 0 | (0) |
| 2012 | → Caxias (loan) | 6 | (0) |
| 2013 | Caxias | 3 | (0) |
| 2013–2015 | Austria Lustenau | 48 | (6) |
| 2015–2017 | Altach | 45 | (1) |
| 2017–2018 | Rapid Wien | 26 | (1) |
| 2018–2019 | FC Ingolstadt | 9 | (0) |
| 2019–2020 | Al-Wasl | 17 | (1) |
| 2020–2022 | Atromitos | 35 | (0) |
| 2022–2025 | Austria Wien | 73 | (1) |
| 2025– | Hatta | 0 | (0) |
- * Club domestic league appearances and goals as of 11 June 2025

Lucas Galvão da Costa Souza (born 22 June 1991) is a Brazilian professional footballer who plays as a centre-back for UAE First Division League club Hatta.
