= Tin Plavotić =

Croatian footballer (born 1997)

Personal information
- Full name: Tin Plavotić
- Date of birth: 30 June 1997 (age 29)
- Place of birth: Vienna, Austria
- Height: 1.97 m (6 ft 6 in)
- Position: Centre-back

Team information
- Current team: Motor Lublin
- Number: 4

Youth career
- Admira Wacker

Senior career*
Years	Team	Apps	(Gls)
2014–2015	Admira Wacker II	3	(1)
2015–2017	FC Schalke 04 II	3	(0)
2017–2018	Bristol City	0	(0)
2017	→ Cheltenham Town (loan)	11	(1)
2018	→ Barnet (loan)	1	(0)
2018–2021	Floridsdorfer AC	67	(3)
2021–2023	Ried	58	(4)
2023–2026	Austria Wien	65	(4)
2026–	Motor Lublin	9	(1)

International career
2016	Croatia U19	2	(0)
- * Club domestic league appearances and goals as of 31 October 2026

Tin Plavotić (born 30 June 1997) is a professional footballer who plays as a centre-back for Ekstraklasa club Motor Lublin. Born in Austria, he has represented Croatia at youth level.

== Career ==
Plavotić began his career playing with the reserve sides Admira Wacker II and FC Schalke 04 II before joining English side Bristol City on 31 January 2017. He was immediately loaned out to League Two side Cheltenham Town, where he made his professional debut in a 1–1 draw against Newport County. Plavotić joined Barnet on loan on 31 January 2018. He made one appearance, at home to Notts County, but after the departure of Graham Westley, new manager Martin Allen announced that Plavotic's loan had been cancelled as there was not enough room for him due to the size of the squad.

On 26 September 2018, Plavotić signed for Floridsdorfer AC. On 28 May 2021, he moved to fellow league club SV Ried on a deal until June 2023.

On 22 June 2023, Plavotić signed for Austria Wien.

On 24 July 2026, Plavotić moved to Polish club Motor Lublin on a two-year deal.
