= Vesel Demaku =

Kosovan footballer (born 2000)

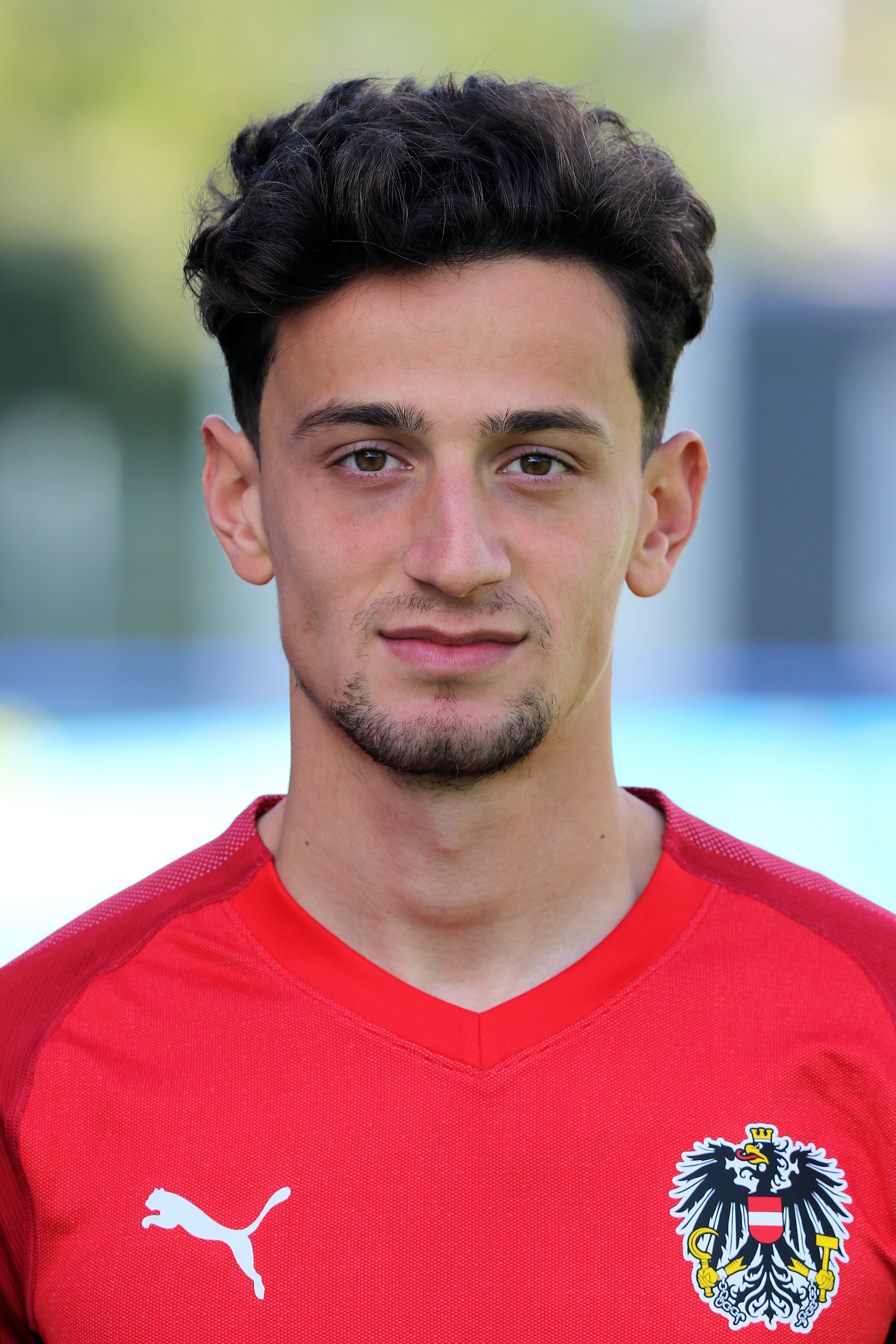
- Demaku with Austria U21 in 2019

Personal information
- Date of birth: 5 February 2000 (age 26)
- Place of birth: Altenmarkt an der Triesting, Austria
- Height: 1.79 m (5 ft 10 in)
- Position: Midfielder

Team information
- Current team: SCR Altach
- Number: 6

Youth career
- 2005–2006: SKV Altenmarkt
- 2006–2009: Rapid Wien
- 2009–2012: Admira Wacker
- 2012–2014: Rapid Wien
- 2014–2017: Red Bull Salzburg

Senior career*
Years	Team	Apps	(Gls)
2017–2022	Austria Wien	70	(1)
2018–2022	→ Austria Wien II	18	(1)
2022–2023	Sturm Graz II	11	(2)
2022–2024	Sturm Graz	3	(0)
2023	→ Austria Klagenfurt (loan)	13	(0)
2024	→ SCR Altach (loan)	15	(1)
2024–	SCR Altach	51	(1)

International career^{‡}
2014–2015	Austria U15	7	(0)
2015	Austria U16	4	(0)
2016–2017	Austria U17	12	(0)
2018	Austria U18	3	(2)
2018	Austria U19	2	(0)
2019	Austria U20	2	(0)
2019–2022	Austria U21	15	(0)
2025–	Kosovo	6	(0)
- * Club domestic league appearances and goals as of 10 June 2026 ‡ National team caps and goals as of 4 October 2026

Vesel Demaku (born 5 February 2000) is a professional footballer who plays as a midfielder for Austrian Bundesliga club SCR Altach. Born in Austria, he plays for the Kosovo national team.

== Club career ==
On 27 March 2017, Demaku joined Austria Wien from Red Bull Salzburg's youth academy, and signed his first professional contract. Demaku made his professional debut for Austria Wien in a 4–0 Austrian Bundesliga win over St. Pölten on 10 March 2018.

On 1 December 2022, Demaku moved on loan to Austria Klagenfurt for the second part of the 2022–23 season.

On 15 January 2024, Demaku joined SCR Altach on loan with an option to buy.

== International career ==
From 2014, until 2022, Demaku has been part of Austria at youth international level, respectively has been part of the U15, U16, U17, U18, U19, U20 and U21 teams and he with these teams played 45 matches and scored two goals.

On 28 October 2024, the Football Federation of Kosovo announced that Demaku had decided to play for the Kosovo national team, and the delay in his decision was due to the lack of permission from Austria to have dual citizenship. He was planned to be called up from Kosovo in November 2024 for the 2024–25 UEFA Nations League matches against Romania and Lithuania, but due to problems with his documentation, could not be part of the national team.

On 19 March 2025, Demaku's request to switch international allegiance to Kosovo was approved by FIFA. His debut with Kosovo came a day later in the 2024–25 UEFA Nations League play-offs against Iceland after coming on as a substitute in the 46th minute in place of Valon Berisha.

== Personal life ==
Demaku was born in Altenmarkt an der Triesting, Austria to ethnic Albanian parents from Drenas, Kosovo. He bears the name of his martyred grandfather killed during the Kosovo War.
