= Manfred Fischer =

Austrian footballer (born 1995)

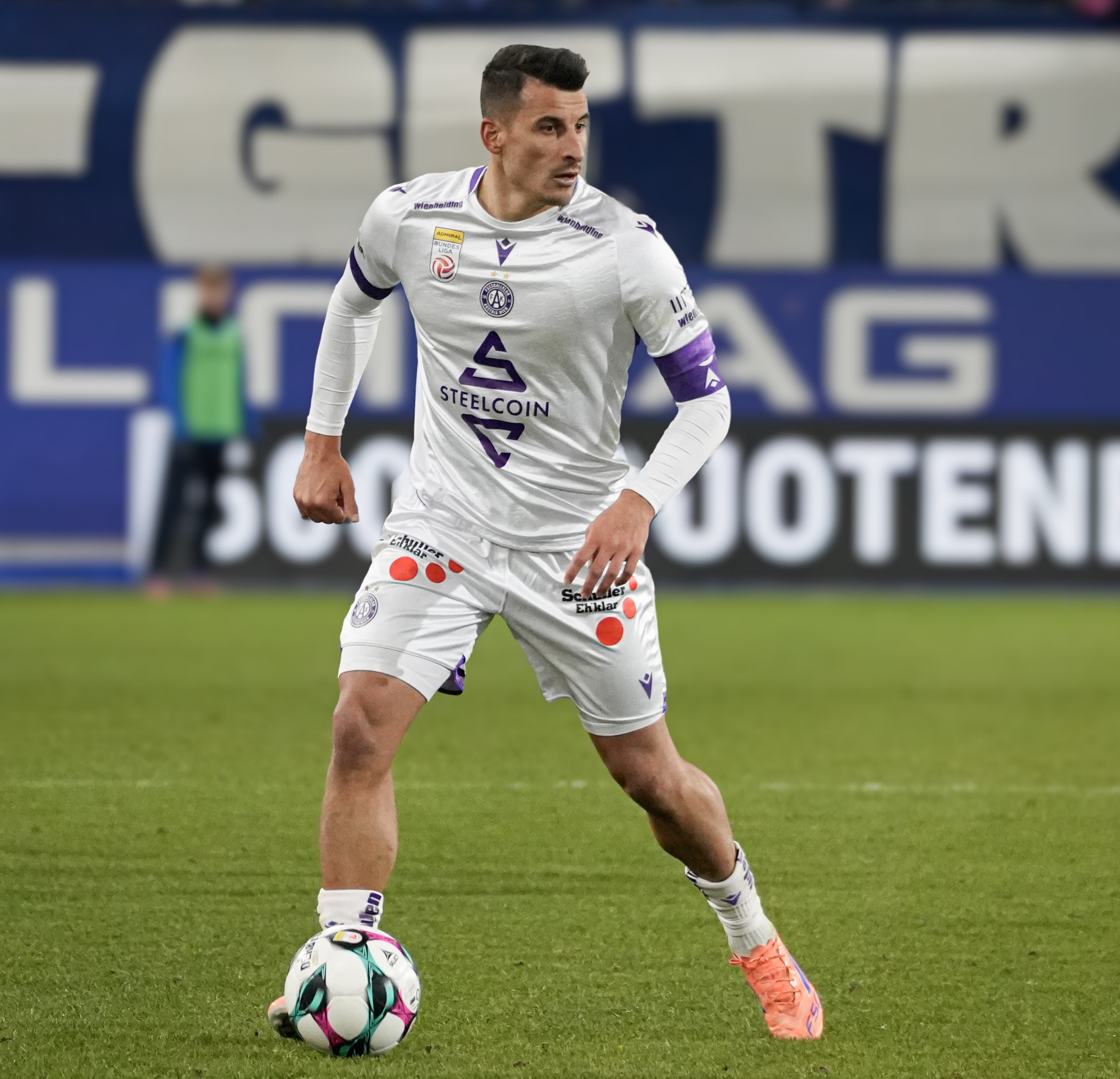
- Fischer in 2025

Personal information
- Date of birth: 6 August 1995 (age 31)
- Place of birth: Birkfeld, Austria
- Height: 1.79 m (5 ft 10 1/2 in)
- Position: Midfielder

Team information
- Current team: Austria Wien
- Number: 30

Youth career
- 2001–2006: Union Birkfeld
- 2006–2009: SC Weiz
- 2009–2013: Grazer AK

Senior career*
Years	Team	Apps	(Gls)
2013–2014	DSV Leoben	26	(3)
2014–2015	SC Kalsdorf	30	(3)
2015–2017	SC Wiener Neustadt	65	(3)
2017–2018	TSV Hartberg	33	(7)
2018–2021	Rheindorf Altach	86	(17)
2021–	Austria Wien	155	(13)
- * Club domestic league appearances and goals as of 10 June 2026

Manfred Fischer (born 6 August 1995) is an Austrian footballer who plays for Austria Wien.

== Career ==
Manfred Fischer started his career at his hometown club Union Birkfeld. In 2006 he moved to the youth teams of SC Weiz. Three years later, the academy of Grazer AK got aware of the talented young player from Eastern Styria. At Grazer AK he also played for the reserves team, but after financial difficulties the club went into administration and had to release all players. Manfred Fischer followed his coach Gregor Pötscher to DSV Leoben. He made his first appearance in Regionalliga Mitte, Austria's 3rd highest league, against FC Gleisdorf 09.

After two successful seasons, he moved to third division club SC Kalsdorf. A year later he was transferred to second division club SC Wiener Neustadt, where he played 65 games in two seasons.

In 2017/18 he got an offer from TSV Hartberg, who was also playing in Austrian Football Second League. TSV Hartberg got promoted in this season, which was the biggest success in the club's history.

After a very successful season, SCR Altach offered him a contract until June 2020. Fischer made his debut in Austria's highest league, Austrian Football Bundesliga, against SV Mattersburg where he was substituted for Stefan Nutz in the 68th minute. A week later he made his debut in the starting eleven against SK Rapid Vienna. He scored his first goal in Bundesliga in August 2018 against FC Red Bull Salzburg.
