= Simon Pirkl =

Austrian footballer (born 1997)

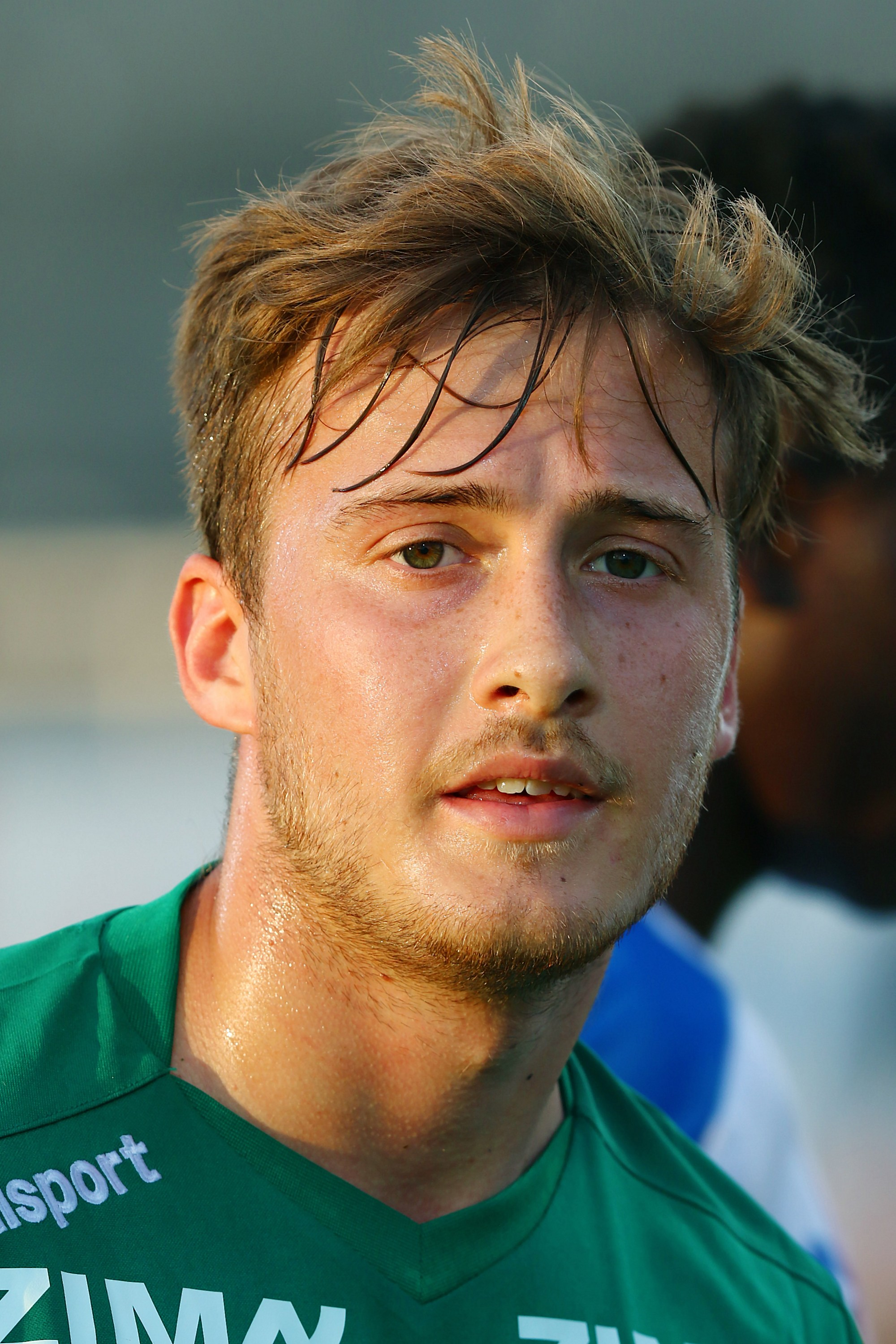
- Pirkl with Austria Lustenau in 2018

Personal information
- Full name: Simon Josef Alois Pirkl
- Date of birth: 3 April 1997 (age 29)
- Place of birth: Innsbruck, Austria
- Height: 1.76 m (5 ft 9 in)
- Position: Left back

Team information
- Current team: Blau-Weiß Linz
- Number: 60

Youth career
- 2005–2014: Wacker Innsbruck

Senior career*
Years	Team	Apps	(Gls)
2014–2018	Wacker Innsbruck II	45	(3)
2014–2019	Wacker Innsbruck	46	(3)
2018	→ Austria Lustenau (loan)	7	(0)
2019–2020	Austria Lustenau	6	(0)
2020–2021	SV Horn	31	(0)
2021–	Blau-Weiß Linz	139	(7)

International career
2012–2013	Austria U16	13	(0)
2013–2014	Austria U17	12	(0)
2014–2015	Austria U18	6	(1)
2016	Austria U19	3	(0)
2017	Austria U21	1	(0)
- * Club domestic league appearances and goals as of 10 June 2026

Simon Josef Alois Pirkl (born 3 April 1997) is an Austrian professional footballer who plays as a left back for Blau-Weiß Linz.
