= Daniel Au Yeong =

Austrian footballer (born 2003)

Personal information
- Full name: Daniel Yuan Hao Au Yeong
- Date of birth: 10 February 2003 (age 23)
- Place of birth: Eindhoven, Netherlands
- Height: 1.81 m (5 ft 11 in)
- Positions: Winger; forward

Team information
- Current team: Schwarz-Weiß Bregenz
- Number: 22

Youth career
- 2019–2022: Freiburg

Senior career*
| Years | Team | Apps | (Gls) |
| 2022–2023 | Austria Wien II | 18 | (1) |
| 2023–2024 | SV Stripfing | 1 | (0) |
| 2024–2026 | Austria Lustenau | 32 | (1) |
| 2026– | Schwarz-Weiß Bregenz | 3 | (0) |

International career^{‡}
| 2017 | Austria U15 | 1 | (1) |
| 2019 | Austria U17 | 1 | (0) |
| 2021 | Austria U19 | 3 | (0) |
- * Club domestic league appearances and goals as of 15 August 2026 ‡ National team caps and goals as of 02:41, 9 September 2022 (UTC)

Daniel Yuan Hao Au Yeong (born 10 February 2003) is a professional footballer who plays as a winger or forward for Schwarz-Weiß Bregenz. He was born in the Netherlands and has represented Austria at the youth level.

== Career ==
=== Club career ===
In 2019, Au Yeong joined the youth academy of German Bundesliga side Freiburg. In 2022, he signed for Austria Wien II in Austria. On 12 August 2022, he debuted for Austria Wien II during a 2–3 loss to Admira. Au Yeong scored a goal for Austria Wien II against Grazer AK on 7 Oct 2022 and had an assist against SKU Amstetten on 21 Oct 2022.

On 1 July 2024, Au Yeong signed for Austria Lustenau.

=== International career ===
Au Yeong is eligible to represent Singapore internationally through his father.

== Personal life ==
Au Yeong was born in the Netherlands to former Singapore international footballer Au-yeong Pak Kuan and an Austrian mother. His sister is an Austrian badminton player, Serena Au Yeong.
