= Marvin Potzmann =

Austrian footballer

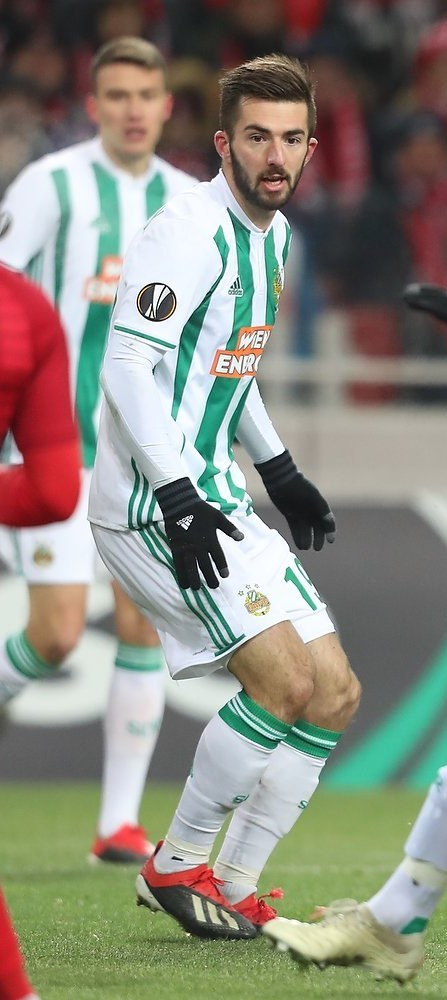
- Potzmann with SK Rapid Wien in 2018

Personal information
- Date of birth: 7 December 1993 (age 32)
- Place of birth: Vienna, Austria
- Height: 1.80 m (5 ft 11 in)
- Position: Midfielder

Team information
- Current team: TuS Bad Waltersdorf
- Number: 22

Youth career
- 1999–2001: Post SV
- 2001–2007: SV Ollersdorf
- 2007–2008: AKA Burgenland

Senior career*
Years	Team	Apps	(Gls)
2009–2013	Mattersburg	33	(5)
2013–2015	Grödig	42	(2)
2015–2018	Sturm Graz	64	(2)
2018–2019	Rapid Wien	21	(1)
2019–2023	LASK	73	(3)
2023–2025	Austria Wien	38	(0)
2025–	TuS Bad Waltersdorf	24	(1)

International career^{‡}
2008–2009	Austria U16	4	(0)
2009–2010	Austria U17	8	(0)
2010	Austria U18	2	(0)
- * Club domestic league appearances and goals as of 13 August 2026 ‡ National team caps and goals as of 17 November 2010

Marvin Potzmann (born 7 December 1993) is an Austrian footballer who plays for TuS Bad Waltersdorf in the Landesliga Steiermark.

== Career ==
On 9 May 2018, he played as Sturm Graz beat Red Bull Salzburg in extra time to win the 2017–18 Austrian Cup.

On 27 June 2023, Potzmann signed for Austria Wien on a two-year contract.

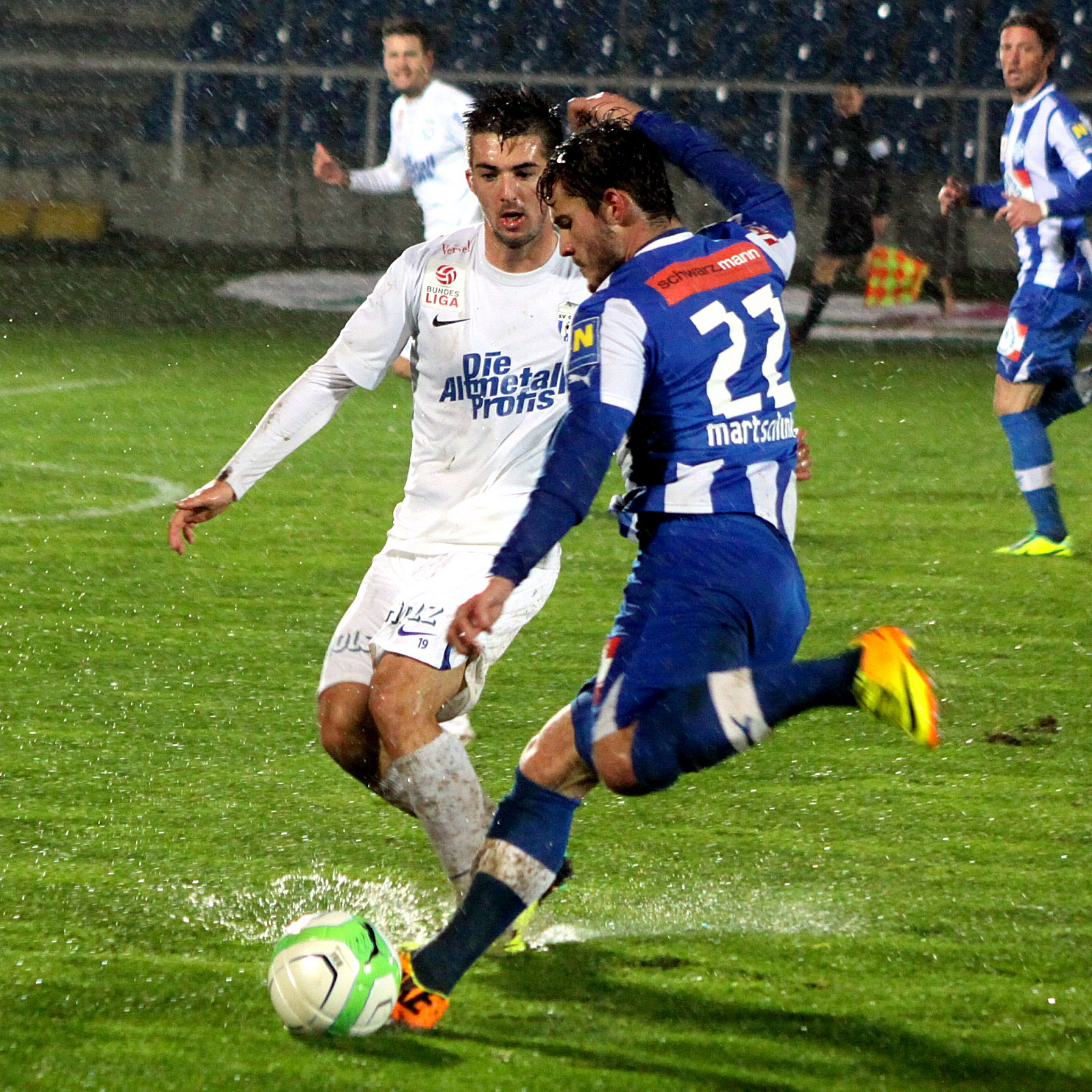
Potzmann (in white shirt) during the match against Wiener Neustadt, 23 November 2013

== Career statistics ==
=== Club ===
As of match played 23 August 2023

Appearances and goals by club, season and competition
Club	Season	League			National Cup (Note: Includes Austrian Cup)		Europe		Other		Total	
Club	Season	Division	Apps	Goals	Apps	Goals	Apps	Goals	Apps	Goals	Apps	Goals
Mattersburg II	2009–10	Austrian Regionalliga	12	0	—		—		—		12	0
Mattersburg II	2010–11	Austrian Regionalliga	27	2	2	0	—		—		29	2
Mattersburg II	2011–12	Austrian Regionalliga	14	1	—		—		—		14	1
Mattersburg II	2012–13	Austrian Regionalliga	3	0	—		—		—		3	0
Mattersburg II	Total		56	3	2	0	—		—		58	3
Mattersburg	2010–11	Austrian Bundesliga	1	0	0	0	—		—		1	0
Mattersburg	2011–12	Austrian Bundesliga	18	2	0	0	—		—		18	2
Mattersburg	2012–13	Austrian Bundesliga	14	3	2	0	—		—		16	3
Mattersburg	Total		33	5	2	0	—		—		35	5
Grödig	2013–14	Austrian Bundesliga	17	1	0	0	—		—		17	1
Grödig	2014–15	Austrian Bundesliga	25	1	2	0	—		—		27	1
Grödig	Total		42	2	2	0	—		—		44	2
Sturm Graz	2015–16	Austrian Bundesliga	22	0	2	1	1 (Note: Appearance(s) in UEFA Europa League)	0	—		25	1
Sturm Graz	2016–17	Austrian Bundesliga	12	0	3	0	—		—		15	0
Sturm Graz	2017–18	Austrian Bundesliga	30	2	5	0	3	0	—		38	2
Sturm Graz	Total		64	2	10	1	4	0	—		78	3
Sturm Graz II	2016–17	Austrian Regionalliga	1	0	—		—		—		1	0
Rapid Wien	2018–19	Austrian Bundesliga	21	1	3	0	11	0	—		35	1
LASK	2019–20	Austrian Bundesliga	16	1	3	0	7	0	—		26	1
LASK	2020–21	Austrian Bundesliga	15	1	4	1	3	0	—		22	2
LASK	2021–22	Austrian Bundesliga	26	1	3	0	11 (Note: Appearance(s) in UEFA Conference League)	1	1 (Note: Appearance(s) in play-off)	0	41	2
LASK	2022–23	Austrian Bundesliga	15	0	3	0	—		—		18	0
LASK	Total		72	3	13	1	21	1	1	0	107	5
Career total			337	0	17	0	5	0	359	0		

== Honours ==
2017/18 Austrian Cup
