= Johannes Handl =

Austrian footballer

Personal information
- Date of birth: 7 May 1998 (age 28)
- Place of birth: Graz, Austria
- Height: 1.96 m (6 ft 5 in)
- Position: Defender

Team information
- Current team: Austria Wien
- Number: 46

Senior career*
Years	Team	Apps	(Gls)
2014–2017	SK Sturm Graz II	15	(2)
2017–2019	Lafnitz	35	(0)
2019	FC Wacker Innsbruck II	10	(1)
2019	Wacker Innsbruck	1	(0)
2019–	Austria Wien	121	(5)
- * Club domestic league appearances and goals as of 10 June 2026

Johannes Handl (born 7 May 1998) is an Austrian footballer who plays for Austria Wien.
