= Mirko Kos =

Austrian association footballer

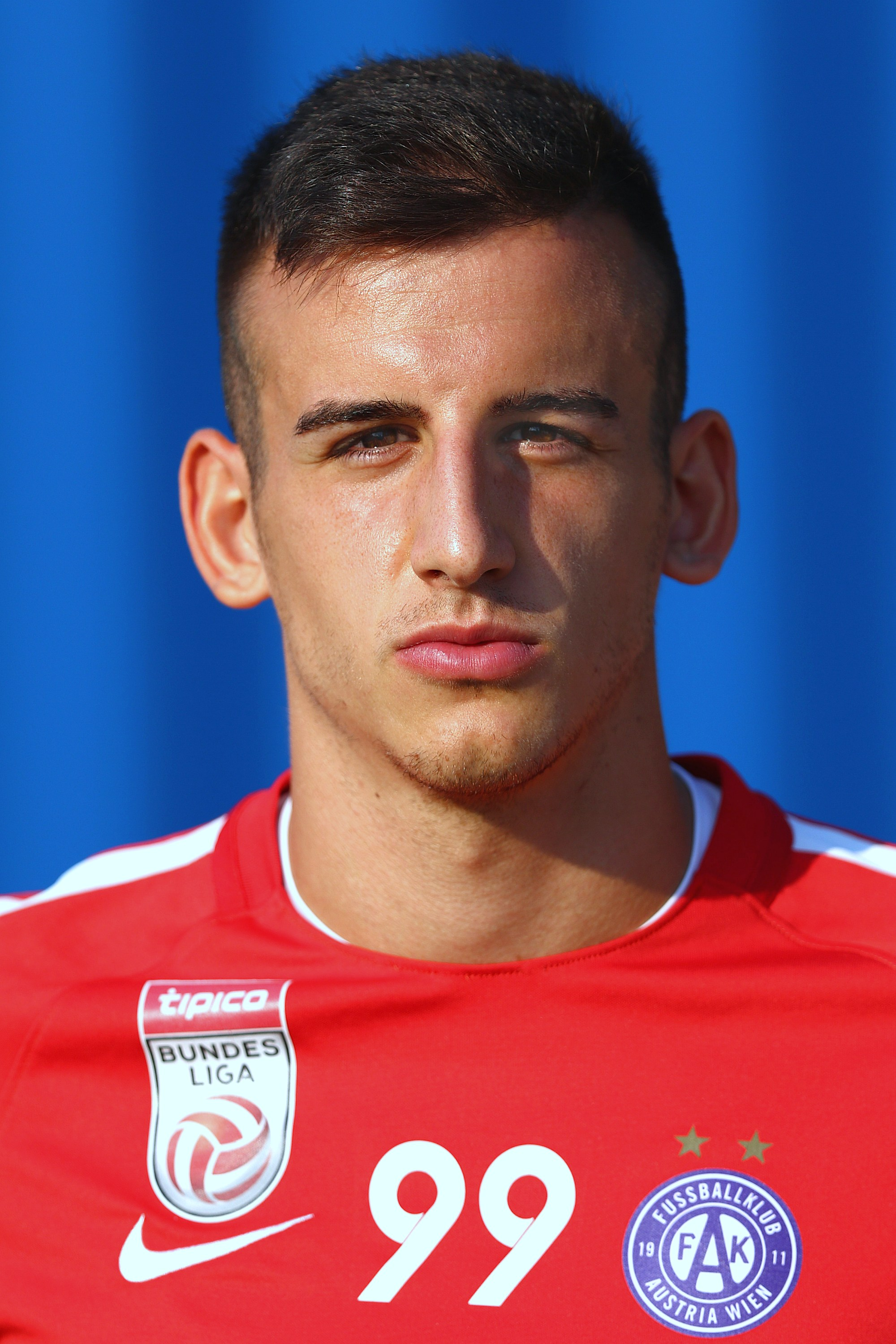
- Kos in 2018

Personal information
- Date of birth: 12 April 1997 (age 29)
- Place of birth: Mürzzuschlag, Austria
- Height: 1.83 m (6 ft 0 in)
- Position: Goalkeeper

Team information
- Current team: Austria Wien
- Number: 99

Youth career
- 2003–2009: Mürzzuschlag
- 2009–2012: Kapfenberger SV
- 2012–2016: Austria Wien

Senior career*
Years	Team	Apps	(Gls)
2016–	Austria Wien II	96	(0)
2017–	Austria Wien	5	(0)
- * Club domestic league appearances and goals as of 26 May 2024 ‡ National team caps and goals as of 16:43, 29 June 2022 (UTC)

Mirko Kos (born 12 April 1997) is an Austrian professional footballer who plays as a goalkeeper for Austria Wien.

== Career ==
Kos is a youth product of Mürzzuschlag and Kapfenberger SV, before joining the youth academy of Austria Wien in 2012. He was promoted to Austria Wien's reserves in 2016, and to their senior team in 2017 signing a professional contract with them. He generally acts as the reserve goalkeeper for Austria Wien, occasionally playing for their reserves as needed. He made his professional debut with them in a 1–0 Austrian Football Bundesliga win over Mattersburg on 7 April 2020.
