= Leonardo Ivkić =

Austrian association footballer

Personal information
- Date of birth: 30 January 2003 (age 23)
- Place of birth: Vienna, Austria
- Height: 1.76 m (5 ft 9 in)
- Position: Right-back

Team information
- Current team: Wiener Sport-Club
- Number: 3

Youth career
- 2012–2014: SK Cro-Vienna
- 2014–2017: Wiener Linien
- 2017–2021: Austria Wien

Senior career*
Years	Team	Apps	(Gls)
2021–2024	Young Violets	26	(2)
2021–2022	Austria Wien	12	(0)
2023–2024	→ SV Stripfing (loan)	5	(0)
2024–	Wiener Sport-Club	52	(1)

International career
2017	Croatia U14	2	(0)
2017–2018	Austria U15	4	(0)
2018–2019	Austria U16	9	(0)
2019	Austria U17	6	(0)
2021	Austria U18	1	(0)
2021–2022	Austria U19	8	(0)
2022	Austria U21	2	(0)
- * Club domestic league appearances and goals as of 28 June 2026

Leonardo Ivkić (born 30 January 2003) is an Austrian professional footballer who plays as a right-back.

== Career ==
Ivkić is a youth product of SK Cro-Vienna and Wiener Linien, before joining Austria Wien's youth academy in 2017. He was promoted to their reserves and eventually senior team in 2021. He signed his first professional contract with Austria Wien on 3 July 2021. He made his professional debut with Austria Wien in a 1–1 Austrian Football Bundesliga tie with WSG Tirol on 1 August 2021.

== International career ==
Born in Austria, Ivkić is of Croatian descent. He represented the Croatia U14s twice in 2017, before switching to represent Austria. Ivkić played for all the Austrian youth levels from U15 to U21, and represented the Austria U19s at the 2022 UEFA European Under-19 Championship.
