= 2021–22 FK Austria Wien season =

Austria Wien
2021–22 season
- Chairman: Frank Hensel
- Head coach: Peter Stöger; Manfred Schmid
- Stadium: Generali Arena
- Austrian Football Bundesliga: 3rd (Championship Group) 4th (League Phase)
- Austrian Cup: Second round
- UEFA Europa Conference League: Second qualifying round
- Top goalscorer: League: Marco Djuricin (9); All: Marco Djuricin (11)
Home colours	Away colours	Third colours
- All statistics correct as of 24 April 2022.

The 2021–22 season was the 111th season in the existence of FK Austria Wien and the club's 73rd consecutive season in the top flight of Austrian football. In addition to the domestic league, Austria Wien participated in this season's editions of the Austrian Cup and the UEFA Europa Conference League.

== Players ==
=== First-team squad ===
As of 30 January 2022

Note: Flags indicate national team as defined under FIFA eligibility rules; some limited exceptions apply. Players may hold more than one non-FIFA nationality.

No.	Pos.	Nation	Player
1	GK	AUT	Patrick Pentz
2	MF	AUT	Florian Wustinger
3	DF	MKD	Filip Antovski
5	MF	GER	Eric Martel (on loan from RB Leipzig)
6	MF	AUT	Niels Hahn
7	FW	AUS	Tristan Hammond
8	MF	AUT	Vesel Demaku
10	MF	AUT	Alexander Grünwald
11	MF	SLO	Martin Pečar (on loan from Eintracht Frankfurt)
13	GK	AUT	Lukas Wedl
14	MF	AUT	Dario Kreiker
15	DF	AUT	Leonardo Ivkic
16	MF	AUT	Can Keles
17	FW	GER	Anouar El Moukhantir
18	FW	ENG	Noah Ohio (on loan from RB Leipzig)
20	DF	GER	Lukas Mühl

No.	Pos.	Nation	Player
21	GK	AUT	Ammar Helac
23	MF	AUT	Matthias Braunöder
24	DF	DOM	Christian Schoissengeyr
25	FW	AUT	Muharem Huskovic
27	FW	AUT	Romeo Vucic
29	DF	AUT	Markus Suttner
30	MF	AUT	Manfred Fischer
36	FW	AUT	Dominik Fitz
39	MF	AUT	Georg Teigl
46	DF	AUT	Johannes Handl
66	DF	LUX	Marvin da Graça
70	DF	AUT	Esad Bejic
77	MF	AUT	Aleksandar Jukic
92	FW	AUT	Marco Djuricin
99	GK	AUT	Mirko Kos

=== Other players under contract ===
Note: Flags indicate national team as defined under FIFA eligibility rules; some limited exceptions apply. Players may hold more than one non-FIFA nationality.

No.	Pos.	Nation	Player
—	FW	NGR	Bright Edomwonyi

== Pre-season and friendlies ==
Win Draw Loss Fixtures

26 June 2021 Friendly	Austria Wien	2–1	Vorwärts Steyr	Vienna, Austria
17:00 CEST (UTC+2)				Stadium: Generali Arena

4 July 2021 Friendly	Austria Wien	4–0	Koper	Feldkirchen in Kärnten, Austria
17:30 CEST (UTC+2)				Stadium: WIGO HAUS Arena

7 July 2021 Friendly	Austria Wien	2–1	Tuzla City	Villach, Austria
18:00 CEST (UTC+2)				Stadium: Sportzentrum Landskron

8 January 2022 Friendly	Austria Wien	21–0	SC Mannswörth	Austria
11:00 CET (UTC+1)

15 January 2022 Friendly	Austria Wien	8–3	TWL Elektra	Austria
12:00 CET (UTC+1)

25 January 2022 Friendly	Austria Wien	0–0	Sochi	Austria
13:00 CET (UTC+1)

28 January 2022 Friendly	Austria Wien	3–1	Hradec Králové	Austria
13:00 CET (UTC+1)

5 February 2022 Friendly	Austria Wien	2–1	St. Pölten	Vienna, Austria
12:00 CET (UTC+1)				Stadium: Generali Arena

== Competitions ==
=== Overall record ===
Competition	First match	Last match	Starting round	Final position	Record							
Competition	First match	Last match	Starting round	Final position	Pld	W	D	L	GF	GA	GD	Win %
Austrian Football Bundesliga	25 July 2021	21 May 2022	Matchday 1	3rd	32	11	13	8	44	39	+5	34.38
Austrian Cup	17 July 2021	21 September 2021	First round	Second round	2	1	1	0	5	1	+4	50.00
UEFA Europa Conference League	22 July 2021	29 July 2021	Second qualifying round	Second qualifying round	2	0	1	1	2	3	−1	0.00
Total					36	12	15	9	51	43	+8	33.33

Source: Soccerway

=== Austrian Football Bundesliga ===
==== Regular stage ====
Austrian Bundesliga regular season table
Pos	Team	Pld	W	D	L	GF	GA	GD	Pts	Qualification
2	Sturm Graz	22	10	7	5	46	32	+14	37	Qualification for the Championship round
3	Wolfsberger AC	22	11	4	7	34	32	+2	37	Qualification for the Championship round
4	Austria Wien	22	8	9	5	31	23	+8	33	Qualification for the Championship round
5	Rapid Wien	22	8	7	7	35	31	+4	31	Qualification for the Championship round
6	Austria Klagenfurt	22	7	9	6	31	33	−2	30	Qualification for the Championship round

Source: Austrian Football Bundesliga
Rules for classification: 1) Points; 2) Head-to-head record; 3) Goal difference; 4) Goals scored; 5) Matches won; 6) Away matches won; 7) Away goals scored.

==== Results summary ====
Overall								Home						Away					
Pld	W	D	L	GF	GA	GD	Pts	W	D	L	GF	GA	GD	W	D	L	GF	GA	GD
4	0	2	2	3	5	−2	2	0	2	0	2	2	0	0	0	2	1	3	−2

Last updated: 15 August 2021.
Source: Austrian Football Bundesliga

==== Results by round ====
Round	1	2	3	4	5
Ground	A	H	A	H	
Result	L	D	L	D	
Position	9	9			

Updated to match(es) played on 15 August 2021. Source: Austrian Football Bundesliga
A = Away; H = Home; W = Win; D = Draw; L = Loss

==== Matches ====
The league fixtures were announced on 22 June 2021.

25 July 2021 1	Ried	2–1	Austria Wien	Ried im Innkreis
17:00 CEST (UTC+2)		Report		Stadium: Keine Sorgen Arena

1 August 2021 2	Austria Wien	1–1	WSG Tirol	Vienna
17:00 CEST (UTC+2)		Report		Stadium: Generali Arena

8 August 2021 3	Red Bull Salzburg	1–0	Austria Wien	Wals-Siezenheim
17:00 CEST (UTC+2)	Adeyemi 71'	Report		Stadium: Stadion Wals-Siezenheim

15 August 2021 4	Austria Wien	1–1	Austria Klagenfurt	Vienna
17:00 CEST (UTC+2)		Report		Stadium: Generali Arena

22 August 2021 5	Sturm Graz	2–2	Austria Wien	Graz
17:00 CEST (UTC+2)	Sarkaria 47'; Yeboah 51'; Stanković (yellow card) 55'; Kiteishvili (yellow card) 88'	Report	Pichler (yellow card) 14'; Djuricin 19' (pen.) 69'; Martel (yellow card) 20'; Handl (yellow card) 43'	Stadium: Merkur-Arena; Attendance: 12,474; Referee: Sebastian Gishamer

29 August 2021 6	Austria Wien	1–1	Rapid Wien	Vienna
17:00 CEST (UTC+2)	Mühl 33'	Report	Grüll 47'	Stadium: Rapid Wien; Attendance: 10,851; Referee: Harald Lechner

12 September 2021 7	LASK	0–2	Austria Wien	Linz
14:30 CEST (UTC+2)		Report		Stadium: Waldstadion Pasching

18 September 2021 8	Austria Wien	0–0	Rheindorf Altach	Vienna
17:00 CEST (UTC+2)		Report		Stadium: Generali Arena

26 September 2021 9	Hartberg	3–4	Austria Wien	Hartberg
14:30 CEST (UTC+2)		Report		Stadium: Profertil Arena Hartberg

2 October 2021 10	Wolfsberger AC	1–0	Austria Wien	Wolfsberg
17:00 CEST (UTC+2)		Report		Stadium: Lavanttal-Arena

16 October 2021 11	Austria Wien	2–2	Admira Wacker Mödling	Vienna
17:00 CEST (UTC+2)		Report		Stadium: Generali Arena

23 October 2021 12	Austria Wien	4–1	Ried	Vienna
17:00 CEST (UTC+2)		Report		Stadium: Generali Arena

31 October 2021 13	WSG Tirol	1–1	Austria Wien	Innsbruck
14:30 CET (UTC+1)		Report		Stadium: Tivoli Stadion Tirol

6 November 2021 14	Austria Wien	0–1	Red Bull Salzburg	Vienna
17:00 CET (UTC+1)	Huskovic (yellow card) 40'; Braunöder (yellow card) 45+3'; El Sheiwi (yellow card) 61'	Report	Ulmer (yellow card) 6'; Camara (yellow card) 13'; Capaldo (yellow card) 35'; Okafor (yellow card) 45+3'; Adeyemi 65'	Stadium: Generali Arena; Attendance: 9,713; Referee: Andreas Heiß

21 November 2021 15	Austria Klagenfurt	0–0	Austria Wien	Klagenfurt
14:30 CET (UTC+1)		Report		Stadium: Wörthersee Stadion

28 November 2021 16	Austria Wien	2–1	Sturm Graz	Wien
14:30 CET (UTC+1)	Demaku (yellow card) 19'; Jukic (yellow card) 41' (goal) 76'; Huskovic 48'; Schoissengeyr (yellow card) 87'	Report	Kuen (red card) 58'; Sarkaria 81'	Stadium: Generali Arena; Attendance: 0 Referee: Manuel Schüttengruber

5 December 2021 17	Rapid Wien	1–1	Austria Wien	Vienna
17:00 CET (UTC+1)		Report		Stadium: Allianz Stadion

12 December 2021 18	Austria Wien	2–3	LASK	Vienna
17:00 CET (UTC+1)		Report		Stadium: Generali Arena

12 February 2022 19	Rheindorf Altach	0–2	Austria Wien	Altach
17:00 CET (UTC+1)		Report		Stadium: Stadion Schnabelholz

19 February 2022 20	Austria Wien	2–0	Hartberg	Vienna
17:00 CET (UTC+1)		Report		Stadium: Generali Arena

27 February 2022 21	Austria Wien	1–0	Wolfsberger AC	Vienna
17:00 CET (UTC+1)		Report		Stadium: Generali Arena

6 March 2022 22	Admira Wacker Mödling	1–2	Austria Wien	Maria Enzersdorf
17:00 CET (UTC+1)		Report		Stadium: BSFZ-Arena

==== Championship round ====
Pos	Team	Pld	W	D	L	GF	GA	GD	Pts	Qualification	RBS	STU	AWI	WOL	RWI	KLA
1	Red Bull Salzburg (C)	32	25	5	2	77	19	+58	52	Qualification for the Champions League group stage	—	1–0	5–0	4–0	2–1	1–1
2	Sturm Graz	32	16	8	8	62	46	+16	37	Qualification for the Champions League third qualifying round	2–1	—	1–0	1–4	2–1	3–1
3	Austria Wien	32	11	13	8	44	39	+5	29	Qualification for the Europa League play-off round	1–2	4–2	—	2–1	1–1	1–1
4	Wolfsberger AC	32	14	5	13	48	53	−5	28	Qualification for the Europa Conference League third qualifying round	1–4	0–2	1–1	—	2–1	1–2
5	Rapid Wien (O)	32	10	11	11	48	45	+3	25	Qualification for the Europa Conference League play-offs	0–1	1–1	1–1	2–1	—	2–2

Legend: Blue = home team win; Yellow = draw; Red = away team win.
Rules for classification: 1) Points; 2) Points with (possible) half points subtracted due to rounding; 3) Head-to-head points; 4) Head-to-head goal difference; 5) Head-to-head goals scored; 6) Head-to-head away goals scored; 7) Goal difference; 8) Goals scored; 9) Matches won; 10) Away matches won; 11) Away goals scored.
(C) Champions; (O) Play-off winners

==== Matches ====
17 April 2022 27	Austria Wien	1–2	Red Bull Salzburg	Vienna
14:30 CEST (UTC+2)	Jukic 65' (pen.); Braunöder (yellow card) 90+5'	Report	Camara (yellow card) 43'; Adamu 52'; Sučić 78'	Stadium: Generali Arena; Referee: Christian-Petru Ciochirca

24 April 2022 28	Red Bull Salzburg	5–0	Austria Wien	Wals-Siezenheim
14:30 CEST (UTC+2)	Okafor 3'; Adeyemi 18'; Sučić 28'; Aaronson 54' (pen.); Camara (yellow card) 60', (goal) 85' (pen.)	Report	Da Graça (yellow card) 18' (yellow-red card) 53'; Fitz (yellow card) 83'	Stadium: Stadion Wals-Siezenheim; Referee: Walter Altmann

=== Austrian Cup ===
17 July 2021 First round	Spittal	0–4	Austria Wien	Spittal an der Drau
11:00 CEST (UTC+2)		Report	Djuricin 16'; Martel 43'; Fischer (yellow card) 80', (goal) 90+1'; Jukic 88'	Stadium: Goldeckstadion; Referee: Christopher Jäger

21 September 2021 Second round	Kapfenberger SV	1–1 (a.e.t.) (5–4 p)	Austria Wien	Kapfenberg
17:30	Pichorner 116'	Report	Ohio 95'	Stadium: Franz Fekete Stadium; Attendance: 2,000; Referee: Sebastian Gishamer
	Penalties
	Cetina (penalty scored); Graschi (penalty scored); Pichorner (penalty scored); Shabanhaxhaj (penalty scored); Grgić (penalty missed); N'Zi (penalty scored)		(penalty scored) Fitz; (penalty scored) Mühl; (penalty scored) Fischer; (penalty missed) Suttner; (penalty scored) Djuricin; (penalty missed) Ohio

=== UEFA Europa Conference League ===
==== Second qualifying round ====
The draw for the second qualifying round was held on 16 June 2021, 13:30 CEST.

22 July 2021 First leg	Austria Wien	1–1	(Iceland) Breiðablik	Vienna, Austria
18:00 CEST (UTC+2)	Djuricin 32'; Handl (yellow card) 40'; Martel (yellow card) 72'; Demaku (yellow card) 76'	Report	Sigurðason 47'	Stadium: Franz Horr Stadium; Attendance: 6,015; Referee: Kári Á Høvdanum (Faroe Islands)

29 July 2021 Second leg	Breiðablik (Iceland)	2–1 (3–2 agg.)	Austria Wien	Kópavogur, Iceland
21:00 CEST (UTC+2)	Steindórsson 6'; Sigurðason (yellow card) 14'; Vilhjálmsson 24'; Einarsson (yellow card) 42'	Report	Martel (yellow card) 13'; Schoissengeyr (yellow card) 35'; Djuricin (yellow card) 45+2'; Fitz (yellow card) 63', (goal) 68'	Stadium: Kópavogsvöllur; Referee: Paul Mclaughlin (Republic of Ireland)
