= 2018–19 1. FC Nürnberg season =

1. FC Nürnberg
2018–19 season
- Chairman: Andreas Bornemann
- Manager: Michael Köllner (until 12 February); Boris Schommers (interim, from 13 February)
- Stadium: Max-Morlock-Stadion
- Bundesliga: 18th (relegated)
- DFB-Pokal: Round of 16
- Top goalscorer: League: Hanno Behrens; Mikael Ishak (4 goals each); All: Mikael Ishak (6 goals)
- Highest home attendance: 50,000
- Lowest home attendance: 29,604
- Average home league attendance: 40,372
- Biggest win: Nürnberg 3–0 Düsseldorf; Nürnberg 3–0 Augsburg
- Biggest defeat: Dortmund 7–0 Nürnberg
Home colours	Away colours	Third colours
- All statistics correct as of 25 May 2019.

The 2018–19 1. FC Nürnberg season is the 119th season in the football club's history and 33rd overall season in the top flight of German football, the Bundesliga, having been promoted from the 2. Bundesliga in 2018. In addition to the domestic league, 1. FC Nürnberg also are participating in this season's edition of the domestic cup, the DFB-Pokal. This is the 69th season for Nürnberg in the Max-Morlock-Stadion, located in Nuremberg, Bavaria, Germany. The season covers a period from 1 July 2018 to 30 June 2019.

== Players ==
=== Squad information ===
As of 30 January 2019

Note: Flags indicate national team as defined under FIFA eligibility rules; some limited exceptions apply. Players may hold more than one non-FIFA nationality.

No.	Pos.	Nation	Player
1	GK	GER	Fabian Bredlow
2	DF	GER	Kevin Goden
4	DF	BRA	Ewerton
7	FW	CMR	Edgar Salli
8	DF	GER	Robert Bauer (on loan from Werder Bremen)
9	FW	SWE	Mikael Ishak
10	MF	GER	Sebastian Kerk
11	FW	SVK	Adam Zreľák
14	FW	JPN	Yuya Kubo (on loan from Gent)
16	MF	CRO	Ivo Iličević
17	MF	GER	Eduard Löwen
18	MF	GER	Hanno Behrens (captain)
19	FW	GER	Törles Knöll
20	DF	AUT	Lukas Jäger
21	FW	GER	Federico Palacios

No.	Pos.	Nation	Player
22	DF	GER	Enrico Valentini
23	DF	GER	Tim Leibold
24	MF	NED	Virgil Misidjan
26	GK	GER	Christian Mathenia
27	MF	BRA	Matheus Pereira (on loan from Sporting CP)
28	DF	GER	Lukas Mühl
29	MF	GER	Patrick Erras
30	GK	GER	Patric Klandt
31	MF	CZE	Ondřej Petrák
33	DF	AUT	Georg Margreitter (vice-captain)
34	DF	GER	Dennis Lippert
35	MF	GER	Alexander Fuchs
37	MF	USA	Timothy Tillman (on loan from Bayern Munich)
38	MF	GER	Simon Rhein

== Friendly matches ==
=== Legend ===
Win Draw Loss

8 July 2018 Friendly	FSV Erlangen-Bruck	2-5	1. FC Nürnberg	Erlangen
17:00				Stadium: Sportgelände FSV Erlangen-Bruck; Attendance: 2,800; Referee: Steffen Brütting

12 July 2018 Friendly	SV Seligenporten	0-3	1. FC Nürnberg	Seligenporten
19:00				Stadium: MAR-Arena; Attendance: 1,700

14 July 2018 Friendly	1. FC Nürnberg	1-2	Hallescher FC	Weismain
17:00				Stadium: Waldstadion; Attendance: 4,004

18 July 2018 Friendly	Regional Selection	0-4	1. FC Nürnberg	Crailsheim
19:00				Stadium: Schönebürgstadion; Attendance: 2,500

21 July 2018 Friendly	Würzburger Kickers	0-4	1. FC Nürnberg	Würzburg
17:00				Stadium: flyeralarm Arena; Attendance: 4,060

31 July 2018 Friendly	TSV 1860 Rosenheim	1-4	1. FC Nürnberg	Natz-Schabs, Italy
17:00				Stadium: Laugen-Arena; Attendance: 600; Referee: Mirco Guerrieri

4 August 2018 Friendly	Bologna F.C.	1-0	1. FC Nürnberg	Brixen, Italy
17:00				Attendance: 2.000; Referee: Daniel Amabile

11 August 2018 Friendly	1. FC Nürnberg	1-0	Real Valladolid	Nuremberg
15:30				Stadium: Max-Morlock-Stadion; Attendance: 7.422; Referee: Robert Schröder

== Competitions ==
Win Draw Loss

=== Overview ===
Competition	First match	Last match	Starting round	Final position	Record							
Competition	First match	Last match	Starting round	Final position	Pld	W	D	L	GF	GA	GD	Win %
Bundesliga	25 August 2018	18 May 2019	Matchday 1		34	3	10	21	26	68	−42	8.82
DFB-Pokal	18 August 2018	5 February 2019	First round	Round of 16	3	1	1	1	4	4	+0	33.33
Total					37	4	11	22	30	72	−42	10.81

Last updated: 25 May 2019
Source: Competitions

=== Bundesliga ===
==== League table ====
Pos	Team	Pld	W	D	L	GF	GA	GD	Pts	Qualification or relegation
14	Schalke 04	34	8	9	17	37	55	−18	33	
15	FC Augsburg	34	8	8	18	51	71	−20	32	
16	VfB Stuttgart (R)	34	7	7	20	32	70	−38	28	Qualification for the relegation play-offs
17	Hannover 96 (R)	34	5	6	23	31	71	−40	21	Relegation to 2. Bundesliga
18	1. FC Nürnberg (R)	34	3	10	21	26	68	−42	19	Relegation to 2. Bundesliga

Source: DFB
Rules for classification: 1) Points; 2) Goal difference; 3) Goals scored; 4) Head-to-head results; 5) Head-to-head away goals scored; 6) Away goals scored; 7) Play-off
(R) Relegated

==== Results summary ====
Overall								Home						Away					
Pld	W	D	L	GF	GA	GD	Pts	W	D	L	GF	GA	GD	W	D	L	GF	GA	GD
34	3	10	21	26	68	−42	19	3	7	7	16	22	−6	0	3	14	10	46	−36

Last updated: 25 May 2019.
Source: Bundesliga

==== Results by round ====
Round	1	2	3	4	5	6	7	8	9	10	11	12	13	14	15	16	17	18	19	20	21	22	23	24	25	26	27	28	29	30	31	32	33	34
Ground	A	H	A	H	A	H	A	H	H	A	H	A	H	A	H	A	H	H	A	H	A	H	A	H	A	A	H	A	H	A	H	A	H	A
Result	L	D	D	W	L	W	L	L	D	D	L	L	D	L	L	L	L	L	L	D	L	D	L	L	L	L	W	D	D	L	D	L	L	L
Position	13	13	14	8	14	10	12	14	14	15	15	15	15	15	17	18	18	18	18	17	18	18	18	18	18	18	17	17	17	17	17	17	18	18

Updated to match(es) played on 25 May 2019. Source: DFB
A = Away; H = Home; W = Win; D = Draw; L = Loss

==== Matches ====
25 August 2018 1	Hertha BSC	1–0	1. FC Nürnberg	Berlin
15:30 CEST (UTC+2)	Ibišević 27'	Report		Stadium: Olympiastadion Berlin; Attendance: 52,729; Referee: Tobias Welz

1 September 2018 2	1. FC Nürnberg	1–1	Mainz 05	Nuremberg
15:30 CEST (UTC+2)	Ishak 48'	Report	Mateta 25'	Stadium: Max-Morlock-Stadion; Attendance: 37,781; Referee: Guido Winkmann

16 September 2018 3	Werder Bremen	1–1	1. FC Nürnberg	Bremen
15:30 CEST (UTC+2)	M. Eggestein 26'	Report	Misidjan 90+2'	Stadium: Weser-Stadion; Attendance: 42,100; Referee: Daniel Schlager

22 September 2018 4	1. FC Nürnberg	2–0	Hannover 96	Nuremberg
15:30 CEST (UTC+2)	Anton 76' (o.g.); Knöll 77'	Report		Stadium: Max-Morlock-Stadion; Attendance: 36,736; Referee: Bastian Dankert

26 September 2018 5	Borussia Dortmund	7–0	1. FC Nürnberg	Dortmund
20:30 CEST (UTC+2)	Bruun Larsen 9'; Reus 32', 58'; Hakimi 49'; Akanji 74'; Sancho 85'; Weigl 88'	Report		Stadium: Signal Iduna Park; Attendance: 75,700; Referee: Patrick Ittrich

29 September 2018 6	1. FC Nürnberg	3–0	Fortuna Düsseldorf	Nuremberg
15:30 CEST (UTC+2)	Behrens 28' (pen.); Ishak 64'; Palacios Martínez 78'	Report		Stadium: Max-Morlock-Stadion; Attendance: 36,102; Referee: Harm Osmers

7 October 2018 7	RB Leipzig	6–0	1. FC Nürnberg	Leipzig
18:00 CEST (UTC+2)	Kampl 3'; Poulsen 7'; Sabitzer 21', 55'; Werner 32', 59'	Report		Stadium: Red Bull Arena; Attendance: 37,389; Referee: Tobias Stieler

20 October 2018 8	1. FC Nürnberg	1–3	1899 Hoffenheim	Nuremberg
15:30 CEST (UTC+2)	Behrens 18' (pen.)	Report	Nelson 50', 57'; Szalai 67'	Stadium: Max-Morlock-Stadion; Attendance: 36,472; Referee: Felix Zwayer

28 October 2018 9	1. FC Nürnberg	1–1	Eintracht Frankfurt	Nuremberg
13:30 CET (UTC+1)	Zreľák 78'	Report	Haller 90+2'	Stadium: Max-Morlock-Stadion; Attendance: 42,154; Referee: Robert Schröder

3 November 2018 10	FC Augsburg	2–2	1. FC Nürnberg	Augsburg
15:30 CET (UTC+1)	Finnbogason 11'; Schmid 59'	Report	Fuchs 54'; Mühl 88'	Stadium: WWK Arena; Attendance: 30,660; Referee: Patrick Ittrich

10 November 2018 11	1. FC Nürnberg	0–2	VfB Stuttgart	Nuremberg
15:30 CET (UTC+1)		Report	Baumgartl 68'; Thommy 82'	Stadium: Max-Morlock-Stadion; Attendance: 50,000; Referee: Christian Dingert

24 November 2018 12	Schalke 04	5–2	1. FC Nürnberg	Gelsenkirchen
18:30 CET (UTC+1)	Skrzybski 26', 84'; Harit 32'; Burgstaller 70'; Oczipka 90+3'	Report	Palacios Martínez 38'; Zreľák 78'	Stadium: Veltins-Arena; Attendance: 62,271; Referee: Guido Winkmann

3 December 2018 13	1. FC Nürnberg	1–1	Bayer Leverkusen	Nuremberg
20:30 CET (UTC+1)	Margreitter 57'	Report	Havertz 29'	Stadium: Max-Morlock-Stadion; Attendance: 32,238; Referee: Bibiana Steinhaus

8 December 2018 14	Bayern Munich	3–0	1. FC Nürnberg	Munich
15:30 CET (UTC+1)	Lewandowski 9', 27'; Ribéry 56'	Report		Stadium: Allianz Arena; Attendance: 75,000; Referee: Tobias Stieler

14 December 2018 15	1. FC Nürnberg	0–2	VfL Wolfsburg	Nuremberg
20:30 CET (UTC+1)		Report	Ginczek 58'; Brekalo 90+3'	Stadium: Max-Morlock-Stadion; Attendance: 29,604; Referee: Sven Jablonski

18 December 2018 16	Borussia Mönchengladbach	2–0	1. FC Nürnberg	Mönchengladbach
18:30 CET (UTC+1)	Hazard 47'; Pléa 86'	Report		Stadium: Borussia-Park; Attendance: 42,323; Referee: Robert Schröder

22 December 2018 17	1. FC Nürnberg	0–1	SC Freiburg	Nuremberg
15:30 CET (UTC+1)		Report	Gulde 19'	Stadium: Max-Morlock-Stadion; Attendance: 36,190; Referee: Robert Kampka

20 January 2019 18	1. FC Nürnberg	1–3	Hertha BSC	Nuremberg
15:30 CET (UTC+1)	Behrens 42'	Report	Ibišević 15'; Duda 50', 70'	Stadium: Max-Morlock-Stadion; Attendance: 36,112; Referee: Guido Winkmann

26 January 2019 19	Mainz 05	2–1	1. FC Nürnberg	Mainz
15:30 CET (UTC+1)	Brosinski 12' (pen.); Quaison 73'	Report	Margreitter 43'	Stadium: Opel Arena; Attendance: 22,005; Referee: Bastian Dankert

2 February 2019 20	1. FC Nürnberg	1–1	Werder Bremen	Nuremberg
15:30 CET (UTC+1)	Ishak 86'	Report	J. Eggestein 63'	Stadium: Max-Morlock-Stadion; Attendance: 35,753; Referee: Robert Kampka

9 February 2019 21	Hannover 96	2–0	1. FC Nürnberg	Hanover
15:30 CET (UTC+1)	Müller 45+5', 77'	Report		Stadium: HDI-Arena; Attendance: 33,700; Referee: Tobias Welz

18 February 2019 22	1. FC Nürnberg	0–0	Borussia Dortmund	Nuremberg
20:30 CET (UTC+1)		Report		Stadium: Max-Morlock-Stadion; Attendance: 50,000; Referee: Harm Osmers

23 February 2019 23	Fortuna Düsseldorf	2–1	1. FC Nürnberg	Düsseldorf
18:30 CET (UTC+1)	Ewerton 62' (o.g.); Ayhan 83'	Report	Löwen 41'	Stadium: Merkur Spiel-Arena; Attendance: 48,816; Referee: Sascha Stegemann

2 March 2019 24	1. FC Nürnberg	0–1	RB Leipzig	Nuremberg
15:30 CET (UTC+1)		Report	Klostermann 40'	Stadium: Max-Morlock-Stadion; Attendance: 34,532; Referee: Daniel Schlager

10 March 2019 25	1899 Hoffenheim	2–1	1. FC Nürnberg	Sinsheim
15:30 CET (UTC+1)	Kramarić 25' (pen.), 78'	Report	Behrens 61'	Stadium: PreZero Arena; Attendance: 29,015; Referee: Christian Dingert

17 March 2019 26	Eintracht Frankfurt	1–0	1. FC Nürnberg	Frankfurt
15:30 CET (UTC+1)	Hinteregger 31'	Report		Stadium: Commerzbank-Arena; Attendance: 51,500; Referee: Bibiana Steinhaus

30 March 2019 27	1. FC Nürnberg	3–0	FC Augsburg	Nuremberg
15:30 CET (UTC+1)	Ishak 52'; Pereira 88'; Löwen 90+1'	Report		Stadium: Max-Morlock-Stadion; Attendance: 42,658; Referee: Daniel Siebert

6 April 2019 28	VfB Stuttgart	1–1	1. FC Nürnberg	Stuttgart
15:30 CEST (UTC+2)	Kabak 75'	Report	Pereira 42'	Stadium: Mercedes-Benz Arena; Attendance: 58,757; Referee: Frank Willenborg

12 April 2019 29	1. FC Nürnberg	1–1	Schalke 04	Nuremberg
20:30 CEST (UTC+2)	Kubo 82'	Report	Nastasić 85'	Stadium: Max-Morlock-Stadion; Attendance: 50,000; Referee: Robert Kampka

20 April 2019 30	Bayer Leverkusen	2–0	1. FC Nürnberg	Leverkusen
15:30 CEST (UTC+2)	Alario 61'; Volland 86'	Report		Stadium: BayArena; Attendance: 26,405; Referee: Guido Winkmann

28 April 2019 31	1. FC Nürnberg	1–1	Bayern Munich	Nuremberg
18:00 CEST (UTC+2)	Pereira 48'	Report	Gnabry 75'	Stadium: Max-Morlock-Stadion; Attendance: 50,000; Referee: Tobias Stieler

4 May 2019 32	VfL Wolfsburg	2–0	1. FC Nürnberg	Wolfsburg
15:30 CEST (UTC+2)	Klaus 38'; Tisserand 78'	Report		Stadium: Volkswagen Arena; Attendance: 22,512; Referee: Daniel Siebert

11 May 2019 33	1. FC Nürnberg	0–4	Borussia Mönchengladbach	Nuremberg
15:30 CEST (UTC+2)		Report	Drmić 56'; Mühl 63' (o.g.); Hazard 65'; Zakaria 80'	Stadium: Max-Morlock-Stadion; Attendance: 50,000; Referee: Frank Willenborg

18 May 2019 34	SC Freiburg	5–1	1. FC Nürnberg	Freiburg
15:30 CEST (UTC+2)	Marco Terazzino 7'; Waldschmidt 34'; Petersen 54', 56'; Grifo 61'	Report	Löwen 69'	Stadium: Schwarzwald-Stadion; Attendance: 24,000; Referee: Markus Schmidt

=== DFB-Pokal ===
18 August 2018 First round	SV Linx	1–2	1. FC Nürnberg	Kehl
15:30 CEST (UTC+2)	Rubio 21' (pen.)	Report	Ishak 15', 88'	Stadium: Rheinstadion; Attendance: 5,600; Referee: Sven Waschitzki

31 October 2018 Second round	Hansa Rostock	2–2 (a.e.t.) (2–4 p)	1. FC Nürnberg	Rostock
18:30 CET (UTC+1)	Breier 35'; Hildebrandt 94'	Report	Zreľák 90'; Palacios Martínez 103'	Stadium: Ostseestadion; Attendance: 23,900; Referee: Martin Thomsen
	Penalties
	Pepić (penalty scored); Hildebrandt (penalty missed); Bülow (penalty missed); Williams (penalty scored)		(penalty scored) Behrens; (penalty scored) Margreitter; (penalty scored) Mühl; (penalty scored) Leibold

5 February 2019 Round of 16	Hamburger SV	1–0	1. FC Nürnberg	Hamburg
18:30 CET (UTC+1)	Özcan 54'	Report		Stadium: Volksparkstadion; Attendance: 47,628; Referee: Harm Osmers
