= 2018–19 DFB-Pokal =

Tournament details
- Country: Germany
- Venue(s): Olympiastadion, Berlin
- Dates: 17 August 2018 – 25 May 2019
- Teams: 64

Final positions
- Champions: Bayern Munich (19th title)
- Runner-up: RB Leipzig
- Europa League: VfL Wolfsburg (Note: Since the winners of the DFB-Pokal qualified for the Champions League based on their league position, the Europa League group stage spot awarded to the DFB-Pokal winner was passed to the sixth-placed team in the Bundesliga, VfL Wolfsburg.)

Tournament statistics
- Matches played: 63
- Goals scored: 247 (3.92 per match)
- Attendance: 1,348,580 (21,406 per match)
- Top goal scorer(s): Robert Lewandowski (7 goals)
- Goals scored in penalty shoot-outs not included.

The 2018–19 DFB-Pokal was the 76th season of the annual German football cup competition. Sixty-four teams participated in the competition, including all teams from the previous year's Bundesliga and the 2. Bundesliga. The competition began on 17 August 2018 with the first of six rounds and ended on 25 May 2019 with the final at the Olympiastadion in Berlin, a nominally neutral venue, which has hosted the final since 1985. The DFB-Pokal is considered the second-most important club title in German football after the Bundesliga championship. The DFB-Pokal is run by the German Football Association (DFB).

The defending champions were Bundesliga side Eintracht Frankfurt, after they defeated Bayern Munich 3–1 in the previous final. Frankfurt were knocked out of the competition in the first round by fourth-division side SSV Ulm, losing 1–2.

Bayern Munich won the final 3–0 against RB Leipzig for their 19th title. With the win, Bayern completed their 12th domestic double, and therefore played away to 2018–19 Bundesliga runners-up Borussia Dortmund in the 2019 DFL-Supercup in August 2019. Because Bayern qualified for the Champions League through the Bundesliga, the sixth-place team in the Bundesliga, VfL Wolfsburg, earned qualification for the group stage of the 2019–20 edition of the UEFA Europa League, and the league's third second round spot went to the team in seventh, Eintracht Frankfurt.

== Participating clubs ==
The following 64 teams qualified for the competition:

| Bundesliga the 18 clubs of the 2017–18 season | 2. Bundesliga; the 18 clubs of the 2017–18 season | 3. Liga; the top 4 clubs of the 2017–18 season |
| FC Augsburg; Hertha BSC; Werder Bremen; Borussia Dortmund; Eintracht Frankfurt; SC Freiburg; Hamburger SV; Hannover 96; 1899 Hoffenheim; 1. FC Köln; RB Leipzig; Bayer Leverkusen; Mainz 05; Borussia Mönchengladbach; Bayern Munich; Schalke 04; VfB Stuttgart; VfL Wolfsburg | Erzgebirge Aue; Union Berlin; Arminia Bielefeld; VfL Bochum; Eintracht Braunschweig; Darmstadt 98; Dynamo Dresden; MSV Duisburg; Fortuna Düsseldorf; Greuther Fürth; 1. FC Heidenheim; FC Ingolstadt; 1. FC Kaiserslautern; Holstein Kiel; 1. FC Nürnberg; Jahn Regensburg; SV Sandhausen; FC St. Pauli | Karlsruher SC; 1. FC Magdeburg; SC Paderborn; Wehen Wiesbaden |
Representatives of the regional associations 24 representatives of 21 regional associations of the DFB, qualified (in general) through the 2017–18 Verbandspokal (Note: The three regions with the most participating teams in their league competitions (Bavaria, Lower Saxony, and Westphalia) were allowed to enter two teams for the competition.)
| Baden: 1. CfR Pforzheim (Note: 1. CfR Pforzheim qualified regardless of the outcome of the final of the Baden Cup, as Karlsruher SC, the other finalists, already qualified for the DFB-Pokal through their 3. Liga position.); Bavaria (Note: In addition to the Bavarian Cup winners, the best-placed amateur team of the Regionalliga Bayern also qualified.): 1. FC Schweinfurt (CW); 1860 Munich (RB); Berlin: BFC Dynamo; Brandenburg: Energie Cottbus; Bremen: BSC Hastedt; Hamburg: TuS Dassendorf; Hesse: TSV Steinbach Haiger | Lower Rhine: Rot-Weiß Oberhausen; Lower Saxony (Note: Both finalists of the Lower Saxony Cup qualified.): SV Drochtersen/Assel; SSV Jeddeloh; Mecklenburg-Vorpommern: Hansa Rostock; Middle Rhine: Viktoria Köln; Rhineland: Rot-Weiss Koblenz; Saarland: SV Elversberg; Saxony: Chemie Leipzig | Saxony-Anhalt: Lok Stendal (Note: Lok Stendal qualified regardless of the outcome of the final of the Saxony-Anhalt Cup, as 1. FC Magdeburg, the other finalists, already qualified for the DFB-Pokal through their 3. Liga position.); Schleswig-Holstein: Weiche Flensburg; South Baden: SV Linx; Southwest: Wormatia Worms; Thuringia: Carl Zeiss Jena; Westphalia (Note: In addition to the Westphalian Cup winners, the winners of a play-off between the best-placed amateur Westphalian team of the Regionalliga West and the best-placed amateur team of the Oberliga Westfalen also qualified.): TuS Erndtebrück (CW) (Note: TuS Erndtebrück qualified regardless of the outcome of the final of the Westphalian Cup, as SC Paderborn, the other finalists, already qualified for the DFB-Pokal through their 3. Liga position.); SV Rödinghausen (PO); Württemberg: SSV Ulm |

== Format ==
=== Participation ===
The DFB-Pokal began with a round of 64 teams. The 36 teams of the Bundesliga and 2. Bundesliga, along with the top four finishers of the 3. Liga, automatically qualified for the tournament. Of the remaining slots, 21 were given to the cup winners of the regional football associations, the Verbandspokal. The three remaining slots were given to the three regional associations with the most men's teams, which at the time were Bavaria, Lower Saxony, and Westphalia. The runners-up of the Lower Saxony Cup were given the slot, along with the best-placed amateur team of the Regionalliga Bayern. For Westphalia, the winners of a play-off between the best-placed team of the Regionalliga West and Oberliga Westfalen also qualified. As every team was entitled to participate in local tournaments which qualified for the association cups, every team could in principle compete in the DFB-Pokal. Reserve teams and combined football sections were not permitted to enter, along with no two teams of the same association or corporation.

=== Draw ===
The draws for the different rounds were conducted as following:

For the first round, the participating teams were split into two pots of 32 teams each. The first pot contained all teams which qualified through their regional cup competitions, the best four teams of the 3. Liga, and the bottom four teams of the 2. Bundesliga. Every team from this pot was drawn to a team from the second pot, which contained all remaining professional teams (all the teams of the Bundesliga and the remaining fourteen 2. Bundesliga teams). The teams from the first pot were set as the home team in the process.

The two-pot scenario was also applied for the second round, with the remaining 3. Liga and/or amateur team(s) in the first pot and the remaining Bundesliga and 2. Bundesliga teams in the other pot. Once again, the 3. Liga and/or amateur team(s) served as hosts. This time the pots did not have to be of equal size though, depending on the results of the first round. Theoretically, it was even possible that there could be only one pot, if all of the teams from one of the pots from the first round had beat all the others in the second pot. Once one pot was empty, the remaining pairings were drawn from the other pot with the first-drawn team for a match serving as hosts.

For the remaining rounds, the draw was conducted from just one pot. Any remaining 3. Liga and/or amateur team(s) were the home team if drawn against a professional team. In every other case, the first-drawn team served as hosts.

=== Match rules ===
Teams met in one game per round. Matches took place for 90 minutes, with two halves of 45 minutes each. If still tied after regulation, 30 minutes of extra time were played, consisting of two periods of 15 minutes each. If the score was still level after this, the match was decided by a penalty shoot-out. A coin toss would decide who took the first penalty. A total of seven players were allowed to be listed on the substitute bench, with up to three substitutions being allowed during regulation. After approval by the IFAB in 2016, the use of a fourth substitute was allowed in extra time as part of a pilot project. From the quarter-finals onward, a video assistant referee was appointed for all DFB-Pokal matches. Though technically possible, VAR was not used for home matches of Bundesliga clubs prior to the quarter-finals in order to provide a uniform approach to all matches.

=== Suspensions ===
If a player received five yellow cards in the competition, he was then suspended from the next cup match. Similarly, receiving a second yellow card suspended a player from the next cup match. If a player received a direct red card, they were suspended a minimum of one match, but the German Football Association reserved the right to increase the suspension.

=== Champion qualification ===
The winners of the DFB-Pokal earned automatic qualification for the group stage of next year's edition of the UEFA Europa League. As winners Bayern Munich had already qualified for the UEFA Champions League by winning the Bundesliga, the spot went to the team in sixth place, VfL Wolfsburg, and the league's second qualifying round spot went to the team in seventh place, Eintracht Frankfurt. As Bayern won both the Bundesliga and the DFB-Pokal, completing a double, the runners-up of the Bundesliga, Borussia Dortmund, hosted the 2019 DFL-Supercup at the start of the next season.

== Schedule ==
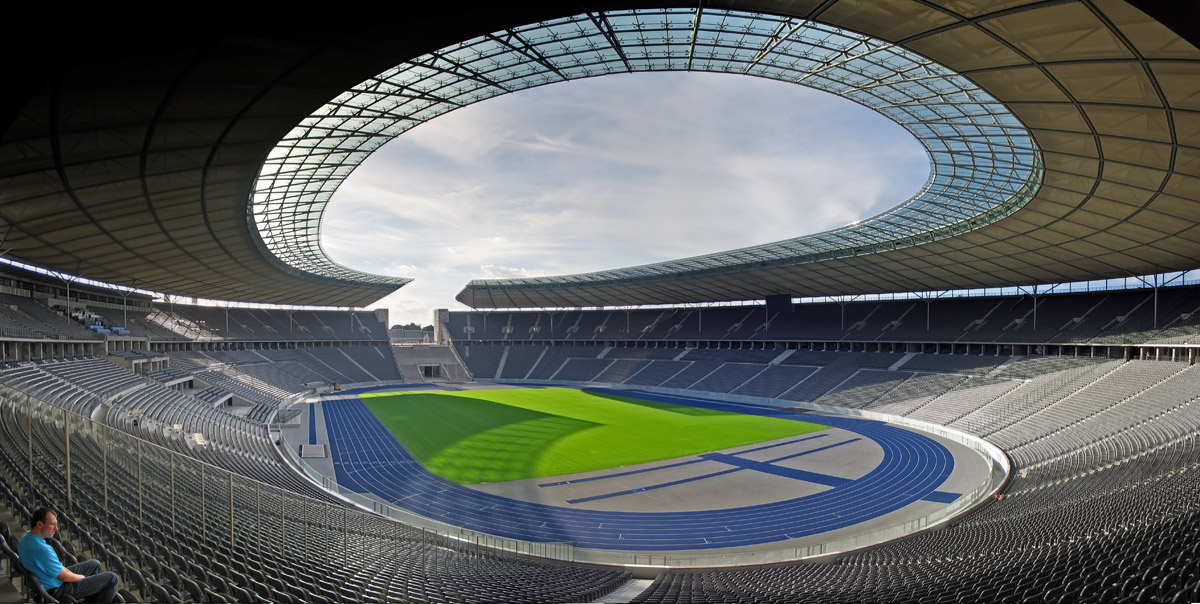
The Olympiastadion in Berlin hosted the final

All draws were held at the German Football Museum in Dortmund, on a Sunday evening at 18:00 after each round (unless noted otherwise). The draws were televised on ARD's Sportschau, broadcast on Das Erste. From the quarter-finals onwards, the draw for the DFB-Pokal der Frauen also generally took place at the same time.

The rounds of the 2018–19 competition were scheduled as follows:

| Round | Draw date | Matches |
|---|---|---|
| First round | 8 June 2018, 22:00 | 17–20 August 2018 |
| Second round | 26 August 2018 | 30–31 October 2018 |
| Round of 16 | 4 November 2018 | 5–6 February 2019 |
| Quarter-finals | 10 February 2019, 18:15 | 2–3 April 2019 |
| Semi-finals | 7 April 2019 | 23–24 April 2019 |
| Final | 7 April 2019 | 25 May 2019 at Olympiastadion, Berlin |

== Matches ==
A total of sixty-three matches took place, starting with the first round on 17 August 2018 and culminating with the final on 25 May 2019 at the Olympiastadion in Berlin.

Times up to 27 October 2018 and from 31 March 2019 are CEST (UTC+2). Times from 28 October 2018 to 30 March 2019 are CET (UTC+1).

=== First round ===
The draw for the first round was held on 8 June 2018 at 22:00, with Palina Rojinski drawing the matches. The thirty-two matches took place from 17 to 20 August 2018.

| 17 August 2018 | Wehen Wiesbaden | 3–2 (a.e.t.) | FC St. Pauli | Wiesbaden |
| 20:45 | Reddemann 35'; Schäffler 103' (pen.); Schmidt 105+1' | Report | Neudecker 51'; Avevor 109' | Stadium: Brita-Arena; Attendance: 10,007; Referee: Christian Dingert |

| 17 August 2018 | 1. FC Magdeburg | 0–1 | Darmstadt 98 | Magdeburg |
| 20:45 | | Report | Kempe 3' (pen.) | Stadium: MDCC-Arena; Attendance: 20,165; Referee: Robert Schröder |

| 17 August 2018 | 1. FC Schweinfurt | 0–2 | Schalke 04 | Schweinfurt |
| 20:45 | | Report | Bentaleb 24' (pen.); Jabiri 75' (o.g.) | Stadium: Willy-Sachs-Stadion; Attendance: 15,060; Referee: Arne Aarnink |

| 18 August 2018 | SV Linx | 1–2 | 1. FC Nürnberg | Kehl (Note: The SV Linx v 1. FC Nürnberg match took place at the Rheinstadion in Kehl instead of SV Linx's home stadium.) |
| 15:30 | Rubio 21' (pen.) | Report | Ishak 15', 88' | Stadium: Rheinstadion; Attendance: 5,600; Referee: Sven Waschitzki |

| 18 August 2018 | SV Rödinghausen | 3–2 (a.e.t.) | Dynamo Dresden | Lotte (Note: The SV Rödinghausen v Dynamo Dresden match took place at the Frimo Stadion in Lotte instead of SV Rödinghausen's home stadium.) |
| 15:30 | Meyer 20'; Engelmann 45+1'; Kunze 120+3' | Report | Duljević 11'; Aosman 25' | Stadium: Frimo Stadion; Attendance: 6,000; Referee: Florian Heft |

| 18 August 2018 | SV Elversberg | 0–1 | VfL Wolfsburg | Spiesen-Elversberg |
| 15:30 | | Report | Ginczek 76' | Stadium: Ursapharm-Arena an der Kaiserlinde; Attendance: 5,000; Referee: Lasse Koslowski |

| 18 August 2018 | TuS Dassendorf | 0–1 | MSV Duisburg | Hamburg (Note: The TuS Dassendorf v MSV Duisburg match took place at the Stadion Sander Tannen in Hamburg instead of TuS Dassendorf's home stadium.) |
| 15:30 | | Report | Tashchy 24' | Stadium: Stadion Sander Tannen; Attendance: 3,500; Referee: Alexander Sather |

| 18 August 2018 | Wormatia Worms | 1–6 | Werder Bremen | Worms |
| 15:30 | Mimbala 44' | Report | Osako 9'; Kainz 21'; Bargfrede 31'; Kruse 41' (pen.); M. Eggestein 45+1'; J. Eggestein 79' | Stadium: EWR-Arena; Attendance: 5,500; Referee: Benedikt Kempkes |

| 18 August 2018 | SV Drochtersen/Assel | 0–1 | Bayern Munich | Drochtersen |
| 15:30 | | Report | Lewandowski 82' | Stadium: Kehdinger Stadion; Attendance: 8,000; Referee: Thorben Siewer |

| 18 August 2018 | 1. FC Kaiserslautern | 1–6 | 1899 Hoffenheim | Kaiserslautern |
| 15:30 | Spalvis 33' | Report | Joelinton 6', 22', 53'; Schulz 13'; Kadeřábek 51'; Brenet 63' | Stadium: Fritz-Walter-Stadion; Attendance: 22,818; Referee: Patrick Ittrich |

| 18 August 2018 | 1. CfR Pforzheim | 0–1 | Bayer Leverkusen | Pforzheim |
| 15:30 | | Report | Alario 27' (pen.) | Stadium: Stadion Holzhof; Attendance: 4,725; Referee: Frank Willenborg |

| 18 August 2018 | SSV Ulm | 2–1 | Eintracht Frankfurt | Ulm |
| 15:30 | Kienle 48'; Lux 75' | Report | Paciência 90' | Stadium: Donaustadion; Attendance: 18,440; Referee: Timo Gerach |

| 18 August 2018 | TuS Erndtebrück | 3–5 | Hamburger SV | Siegen (Note: The TuS Erndtebrück v Hamburger SV match took place at the Leimbachstadion in Siegen instead of TuS Erndtebrück's home stadium.) |
| 18:30 | Yamazaki 43'; Hunold 48'; Hilchenbach 71' | Report | Holtby 7' (pen.); Arp 10'; Lasogga 64', 65'; Mangala 90' | Stadium: Leimbachstadion; Attendance: 13,588; Referee: Robert Kempter |

| 18 August 2018 | Rot-Weiß Oberhausen | 0–6 | SV Sandhausen | Oberhausen |
| 18:30 | | Report | Schleusener 7'; Müller 24', 90+2'; Förster 46' (pen.); Kister 61'; Karl 83' | Stadium: Niederrheinstadion; Attendance: 5,000; Referee: Florian Badstübner |

| 18 August 2018 | Erzgebirge Aue | 1–3 | Mainz 05 | Aue |
| 18:30 | Testroet 83' | Report | Maxim 31', 65'; Quaison 59' | Stadium: Erzgebirgsstadion; Attendance: 7,600; Referee: Felix Zwayer |

| 18 August 2018 | Hansa Rostock | 2–0 | VfB Stuttgart | Rostock |
| 20:45 | Soukou 8'; Pepić 84' | Report | | Stadium: Ostseestadion; Attendance: 23,000; Referee: Tobias Stieler |

| 19 August 2018 | Lok Stendal | 0–5 | Arminia Bielefeld | Stendal |
| 15:30 | | Report | Owusu 11', 61'; Schipplock 63', 69' (pen.); Schütz 66' | Stadium: Stadion am Hölzchen; Attendance: 3,000; Referee: Christian Dietz |

| 19 August 2018 | TSV Steinbach Haiger | 1–2 | FC Augsburg | Haiger |
| 15:30 | Herzig 55' | Report | Richter 14'; Hahn 65' | Stadium: Sibre-Sportzentrum Haarwasen Haiger; Attendance: 4,204; Referee: Martin Thomsen |

| 19 August 2018 | Rot-Weiss Koblenz | 0–5 | Fortuna Düsseldorf | Koblenz (Note: The Rot-Weiss Koblenz v Fortuna Düsseldorf match took place at the Stadion Oberwerth in Koblenz instead of Rot-Weiss Koblenz's home stadium.) |
| 15:30 | | Report | Lukebakio 9', 12'; Ducksch 32'; Stöger 44'; Raman 62' | Stadium: Stadion Oberwerth; Attendance: 7,500; Referee: Benjamin Cortus |

| 19 August 2018 | Weiche Flensburg | 1–0 | VfL Bochum | Flensburg |
| 15:30 | Schulz 34' | Report | | Stadium: Manfred-Werner-Stadion; Attendance: 3,500; Referee: René Rohde |

| 19 August 2018 | Chemie Leipzig | 2–1 | Jahn Regensburg | Leipzig |
| 15:30 | Wendt 69'; Druschky 90+1' | Report | Derstroff 20' | Stadium: Alfred-Kunze-Sportpark; Attendance: 4,999; Referee: Tobias Reichel |

| 19 August 2018 | BFC Dynamo | 1–9 | 1. FC Köln | Berlin (Note: The BFC Dynamo v 1. FC Köln match took place at the Olympiastadion in Berlin instead of BFC Dynamo's home stadium Friedrich-Ludwig-Jahn-Sportpark due to the 2018 European Athletics Championships.) |
| 15:30 | Twardzik 19' | Report | Terodde 21', 34', 41', 75'; Drexler 44', 66'; Risse 58'; Koziello 61'; Schaub 86' | Stadium: Olympiastadion; Attendance: 14,357; Referee: Johann Pfeifer |

| 19 August 2018 | SSV Jeddeloh | 2–5 | 1. FC Heidenheim | Oldenburg (Note: The SSV Jeddeloh v 1. FC Heidenheim match took place at the Marschweg-Stadion in Oldenburg instead of SSV Jeddeloh's home stadium.) |
| 15:30 | Lindemann 76' (pen.); Tönnies 79' | Report | Griesbeck 22'; Pusch 32', 39'; Glatzel 56'; Lankford 90+2' | Stadium: Marschweg-Stadion; Attendance: 4,508; Referee: Michael Bacher |

| 19 August 2018 | Viktoria Köln | 1–3 | RB Leipzig | Cologne |
| 15:30 | Golley 39' | Report | Poulsen 60'; Forsberg 69'; Augustin 90+3' | Stadium: Sportpark Höhenberg; Attendance: 6,000; Referee: Martin Petersen |

| 19 August 2018 | Karlsruher SC | 0–6 | Hannover 96 | Karlsruhe |
| 15:30 | | Report | Wimmer 17'; Bebou 31'; Füllkrug 41' (pen.); Asano 51'; Weydandt 85', 90' | Stadium: Wildparkstadion; Attendance: 10,000; Referee: Bastian Dankert |

| 19 August 2018 | 1860 Munich | 1–3 | Holstein Kiel | Munich |
| 18:30 | Karger 7' | Report | Mühling 74', 83'; Schindler 87' | Stadium: Städtisches Stadion an der Grünwalder Straße; Attendance: 14,200; Referee: Sascha Stegemann |

| 19 August 2018 | Carl Zeiss Jena | 2–4 | Union Berlin | Jena |
| 18:30 | Wolfram 21'; Trimmel 42' (o.g.) | Report | Andersson 14'; Kroos 29'; Hedlund 45+5' (pen.), 71' | Stadium: Ernst-Abbe-Sportfeld; Attendance: 10,600; Referee: Felix Brych |

| 19 August 2018 | BSC Hastedt | 1–11 | Borussia Mönchengladbach | Bremen (Note: The BSC Hastedt v Borussia Mönchengladbach match took place at the Weserstadion Platz 11 in Bremen instead of BSC Hastedt's home stadium.) |
| 18:30 | Kücük 88' | Report | Hazard 2' (pen.), 42', 84'; Pléa 8', 50', 78'; Raffael 15', 30', 66'; Neuhaus 39'; Hofmann 56' | Stadium: Weserstadion Platz 11; Attendance: 4,997; Referee: Christof Günsch |

| 20 August 2018 | SC Paderborn | 2–1 | FC Ingolstadt | Paderborn |
| 18:30 | Hünemeier 34', 44' | Report | Kittel 76' | Stadium: Benteler-Arena; Attendance: 9,427; Referee: Daniel Siebert |

| 20 August 2018 | Energie Cottbus | 2–2 (a.e.t.) (3–5 p) | SC Freiburg | Cottbus |
| 18:30 | Marcelo Freitas 47'; Viteritti 103' | Report | Frantz 90+1'; Petersen 99' | Stadium: Stadion der Freundschaft; Attendance: 15,245; Referee: Harm Osmers |
| | Penalties |
| | Stein (penalty scored); Marcelo Freitas (penalty scored); Schlüter (penalty scored); Kruse (penalty missed) | | (penalty scored) Petersen; (penalty scored) Lienhart; (penalty scored) Höfler; (penalty scored) Frantz; (penalty scored) Heintz |

| 20 August 2018 | Eintracht Braunschweig | 1–2 | Hertha BSC | Braunschweig |
| 18:30 | Fejzullahu 81' | Report | Plattenhardt 38'; Ibišević 83' | Stadium: Eintracht-Stadion; Attendance: 16,710; Referee: Guido Winkmann |

| 20 August 2018 | Greuther Fürth | 1–2 (a.e.t.) | Borussia Dortmund | Fürth |
| 20:45 | Ernst 77' | Report | Witsel 90+5'; Reus 120+1' | Stadium: Sportpark Ronhof Thomas Sommer; Attendance: 15,500; Referee: Manuel Gräfe |

=== Second round ===
The draw for the second round was held on 26 August 2018 at 18:00, with Gina Lückenkemper drawing the matches. The sixteen matches took place from 30 to 31 October 2018.

| 30 October 2018 | Hannover 96 | 0–2 | VfL Wolfsburg | Hanover |
| 18:30 | | Report | Mehmedi 20'; Weghorst 90+3' | Stadium: HDI-Arena; Attendance: 34,400; Referee: Benjamin Cortus |

| 30 October 2018 | SSV Ulm | 1–5 | Fortuna Düsseldorf | Ulm |
| 18:30 | Morina 1' | Report | Ducksch 15', 70'; Hennings 33'; Lukebakio 37', 43' | Stadium: Donaustadion; Attendance: 17,000; Referee: Florian Badstübner |

| 30 October 2018 | Chemie Leipzig | 0–3 | SC Paderborn | Leipzig |
| 18:30 | | Report | Guèye 18', 60'; Hünemeier 28' | Stadium: Alfred-Kunze-Sportpark; Attendance: 4,999; Referee: Christian Dietz |

| 30 October 2018 | Darmstadt 98 | 0–2 | Hertha BSC | Darmstadt |
| 18:45 (Note: The Darmstadt 98 v Hertha BSC match, originally scheduled for 18:30 CET, was delayed to 18:45 CET due to a traffic jam around the stadium.) | | Report | Ibišević 64'; Mittelstädt 88' | Stadium: Merck-Stadion am Böllenfalltor; Attendance: 15,000; Referee: Robert Kampka |

| 30 October 2018 | FC Augsburg | 3–2 (a.e.t.) | Mainz 05 | Augsburg |
| 20:45 | Bell 40' (o.g.); Gregoritsch 86'; Caiuby 105' | Report | Mwene 19'; Quaison 45' | Stadium: WWK Arena; Attendance: 15,561; Referee: Manuel Gräfe |

| 30 October 2018 | 1. FC Heidenheim | 3–0 | SV Sandhausen | Heidenheim |
| 20:45 | Schnatterer 8' (pen.); Dovedan 20', 86' | Report | | Stadium: Voith-Arena; Attendance: 4,300; Referee: Sven Waschitzki |

| 30 October 2018 | SV Rödinghausen | 1–2 | Bayern Munich | Osnabrück (Note: The SV Rödinghausen v Bayern Munich match took place at the Stadion an der Bremer Brücke in Osnabrück instead of SV Rödinghausen's home stadium.) |
| 20:45 | Meyer 49' | Report | Wagner 8'; Müller 13' (pen.) | Stadium: Stadion an der Bremer Brücke; Attendance: 16,000; Referee: Timo Gerach |

| 30 October 2018 | Wehen Wiesbaden | 0–3 | Hamburger SV | Wiesbaden |
| 20:45 | | Report | Lasogga 21', 51'; Douglas Santos 90+7' | Stadium: Brita-Arena; Attendance: 11,170; Referee: Matthias Jöllenbeck |

| 31 October 2018 | Borussia Dortmund | 3–2 (a.e.t.) | Union Berlin | Dortmund |
| 18:30 | Pulisic 40'; Philipp 73'; Reus 120+1' (pen.) | Report | Polter 63', 87' | Stadium: Signal Iduna Park; Attendance: 72,732; Referee: Guido Winkmann |

| 31 October 2018 | 1. FC Köln | 1–1 (a.e.t.) (5–6 p) | Schalke 04 | Cologne |
| 18:30 | Córdoba 43' | Report | Bentaleb 88' (pen.) | Stadium: RheinEnergieStadion; Attendance: 50,000; Referee: Harm Osmers |
| | Penalties |
| | Höger (penalty missed); Özcan (penalty scored); Terodde (penalty scored); Guirassy (penalty scored); Risse (penalty scored); Hector (penalty scored); Drexler (penalty missed) | | (penalty scored) Burgstaller; (penalty scored) Nastasić; (penalty scored) Caligiuri; (penalty scored) Harit; (penalty missed) Bentaleb; (penalty scored) Rudy; (penalty scored) Uth |

| 31 October 2018 | Weiche Flensburg | 1–5 | Werder Bremen | Lübeck (Note: The Weiche Flensburg v Werder Bremen match took place at the Stadion Lohmühle in Lübeck instead of Weiche Flensburg's home stadium.) |
| 18:30 | Ilídio 27' | Report | Pizarro 8'; Kainz 38'; Klaassen 44' (pen.); Harnik 76', 81' | Stadium: Stadion Lohmühle; Attendance: 8,637; Referee: Tobias Reichel |

| 31 October 2018 | Hansa Rostock | 2–2 (a.e.t.) (2–4 p) | 1. FC Nürnberg | Rostock |
| 18:30 | Breier 35'; Hildebrandt 94' | Report | Zreľák 90'; Palacios Martínez 103' | Stadium: Ostseestadion; Attendance: 23,900; Referee: Martin Thomsen |
| | Penalties |
| | Pepić (penalty scored); Hildebrandt (penalty missed); Bülow (penalty missed); Williams (penalty scored) | | (penalty scored) Behrens; (penalty scored) Margreitter; (penalty scored) Mühl; (penalty scored) Leibold |

| 31 October 2018 | Borussia Mönchengladbach | 0–5 | Bayer Leverkusen | Mönchengladbach |
| 20:45 | | Report | Brandt 5'; Jedvaj 45+1'; Bellarabi 67', 74'; Volland 80' | Stadium: Borussia-Park; Attendance: 48,755; Referee: Tobias Welz |

| 31 October 2018 | RB Leipzig | 2–0 | 1899 Hoffenheim | Leipzig |
| 20:45 | Werner 48', 56' | Report | | Stadium: Red Bull Arena; Attendance: 21,042; Referee: Marco Fritz |

| 31 October 2018 | Arminia Bielefeld | 0–3 | MSV Duisburg | Bielefeld |
| 20:45 | | Report | Verhoek 12'; Schnellhardt 39'; Cauly 45' | Stadium: SchücoArena; Attendance: 19,143; Referee: Arne Aarnink |

| 31 October 2018 | Holstein Kiel | 2–1 | SC Freiburg | Kiel |
| 20:45 | Serra 26'; Kinsombi 79' | Report | Petersen 1' | Stadium: Holstein-Stadion; Attendance: 9,361; Referee: Sören Storks |

=== Round of 16 ===
The draw for the round of 16 was held on 4 November 2018 at 18:00, with Serdal Celebi drawing the matches. The eight matches took place from 5 to 6 February 2019.

| 5 February 2019 | Hamburger SV | 1–0 | 1. FC Nürnberg | Hamburg |
| 18:30 | Özcan 54' | Report | | Stadium: Volksparkstadion; Attendance: 47,628; Referee: Harm Osmers |

| 5 February 2019 | 1. FC Heidenheim | 2–1 | Bayer Leverkusen | Heidenheim |
| 18:30 | Dovedan 47'; Multhaup 72' | Report | Brandt 44' | Stadium: Voith-Arena; Attendance: 11,400; Referee: Robert Hartmann |

| 5 February 2019 | MSV Duisburg | 1–3 | SC Paderborn | Duisburg |
| 20:45 | Cauly 47' | Report | Tekpetey 52'; Pröger 61'; Antwi-Adjei 76' | Stadium: Schauinsland-Reisen-Arena; Attendance: 12,509; Referee: Sven Jablonski |

| 5 February 2019 | Borussia Dortmund | 3–3 (a.e.t.) (2–4 p) | Werder Bremen | Dortmund |
| 20:45 | Reus 45+3'; Pulisic 105'; Hakimi 113' | Report | Rashica 5'; Pizarro 108'; Harnik 119' | Stadium: Signal Iduna Park; Attendance: 81,365; Referee: Felix Brych |
| | Penalties |
| | Alcácer (penalty missed); Philipp (penalty missed); Witsel (penalty scored); Weigl (penalty scored) | | (penalty scored) Pizarro; (penalty scored) M. Eggestein; (penalty scored) Klaassen; (penalty scored) Kruse |

| 6 February 2019 | Holstein Kiel | 0–1 | FC Augsburg | Kiel |
| 18:30 | | Report | Gregoritsch 85' | Stadium: Holstein-Stadion; Attendance: 11,198; Referee: Frank Willenborg |

| 6 February 2019 | RB Leipzig | 1–0 | VfL Wolfsburg | Leipzig |
| 18:30 | Cunha 9' | Report | | Stadium: Red Bull Arena; Attendance: 21,135; Referee: Christian Dingert |

| 6 February 2019 | Schalke 04 | 4–1 | Fortuna Düsseldorf | Gelsenkirchen |
| 20:45 | Kutucu 30'; Sané 48', 87'; Uth 53' | Report | Hennings 71' | Stadium: Veltins-Arena; Attendance: 56,638; Referee: Manuel Gräfe |

| 6 February 2019 | Hertha BSC | 2–3 (a.e.t.) | Bayern Munich | Berlin |
| 20:45 | Mittelstädt 3'; Selke 67' | Report | Gnabry 7', 49'; Coman 98' | Stadium: Olympiastadion; Attendance: 74,667; Referee: Markus Schmidt |

=== Quarter-finals ===
The draw for the quarter-finals was held on 10 February 2019 at 18:15, with Fabian Böhm drawing the matches. The four matches took place from 2 to 3 April 2019.

| 2 April 2019 | SC Paderborn | 0–2 | Hamburger SV | Paderborn |
| 18:30 | | Report | Lasogga 54', 68' | Stadium: Benteler-Arena; Attendance: 15,000; Referee: Tobias Welz |

| 2 April 2019 | FC Augsburg | 1–2 (a.e.t.) | RB Leipzig | Augsburg |
| 20:45 | Finnbogason 90+4' | Report | Werner 74'; Halstenberg 120+1' (pen.) | Stadium: WWK Arena; Attendance: 25,263; Referee: Tobias Stieler |

| 3 April 2019 | Bayern Munich | 5–4 | 1. FC Heidenheim | Munich |
| 18:30 | Goretzka 12'; Müller 53'; Lewandowski 55', 84' (pen.); Gnabry 65' | Report | Glatzel 26', 74', 77' (pen.); Schnatterer 39' | Stadium: Allianz Arena; Attendance: 75,000; Referee: Guido Winkmann |

| 3 April 2019 | Schalke 04 | 0–2 | Werder Bremen | Gelsenkirchen |
| 20:45 | | Report | Rashica 65'; Klaassen 72' | Stadium: Veltins-Arena; Attendance: 61,597; Referee: Deniz Aytekin |

=== Semi-finals ===
The draw for the semi-finals was held on 7 April 2019 at 18:00, with Lena Goeßling drawing the matches. The two matches took place on 23 and 24 April 2019.

23 April 2019
20:45

| Hamburger SV | 1–3 | RB Leipzig |
|---|---|---|
| Jatta 24' | Report | Poulsen 12'; Janjičić 53' (o.g.); Forsberg 72' |

Volksparkstadion, Hamburg
Attendance: 52,365
Referee: Felix Brych

24 April 2019
20:45

| Werder Bremen | 2–3 | Bayern Munich |
|---|---|---|
| Osako 74'; Rashica 75' | Report | Lewandowski 36', 80' (pen.); Müller 63' |

Weser-Stadion, Bremen
Attendance: 42,100
Referee: Daniel Siebert

=== Final ===
The final took place on 25 May 2019 at the Olympiastadion in Berlin.

25 May 2019
20:00 CEST

| RB Leipzig | 0–3 | Bayern Munich |
|---|---|---|
| | Report | Lewandowski 29', 85'; Coman 78' |

Olympiastadion, Berlin
Attendance: 74,322
Referee: Tobias Stieler (Hamburg)

== Bracket ==
The following is the bracket which the DFB-Pokal resembled. Numbers in parentheses next to the match score represent the results of a penalty shoot-out.

First round 17–20 August 2018
Lok Stendal | 0
Arminia Bielefeld | 5
TuS Dassendorf | 0
MSV Duisburg | 1
Chemie Leipzig | 2
Jahn Regensburg | 1
SC Paderborn | 2
FC Ingolstadt | 1
Wehen Wiesbaden (a.e.t.) | 3
FC St. Pauli | 2
TuS Erndtebrück | 3
Hamburger SV | 5
Hansa Rostock | 2
VfB Stuttgart | 0
SV Linx | 1
1. FC Nürnberg | 2
1860 Munich | 1
Holstein Kiel | 3
Energie Cottbus | 2 (3)
SC Freiburg (p) | 2 (5)
TSV Steinbach Haiger | 1
FC Augsburg | 2
Erzgebirge Aue | 1
Mainz 05 | 3
Viktoria Köln | 1
RB Leipzig | 3
1. FC Kaiserslautern | 1
1899 Hoffenheim | 6
Karlsruher SC | 0
Hannover 96 | 6
SV Elversberg | 0
VfL Wolfsburg | 1
BFC Dynamo | 1
1. FC Köln | 9
1. FC Schweinfurt | 0
Schalke 04 | 2
SSV Ulm | 2
Eintracht Frankfurt | 1
Rot-Weiss Koblenz | 0
Fortuna Düsseldorf | 5
Greuther Fürth | 1
Borussia Dortmund (a.e.t.) | 2
Carl Zeiss Jena | 2
Union Berlin | 4
Weiche Flensburg | 1
VfL Bochum | 0
Wormatia Worms | 1
Werder Bremen | 6
1. FC Magdeburg | 0
Darmstadt 98 | 1
Eintracht Braunschweig | 1
Hertha BSC | 2
SV Rödinghausen (a.e.t.) | 3
Dynamo Dresden | 2
SV Drochtersen/Assel | 0
Bayern Munich | 1
SSV Jeddeloh | 2
1. FC Heidenheim | 5
Rot-Weiß Oberhausen | 0
SV Sandhausen | 6
BSC Hastedt | 1
Borussia Mönchengladbach | 11
1. CfR Pforzheim | 0
Bayer Leverkusen | 1

Second round 30–31 October 2018
Arminia Bielefeld | 0
MSV Duisburg | 3
Chemie Leipzig | 0
SC Paderborn | 3
Wehen Wiesbaden | 0
Hamburger SV | 3
Hansa Rostock | 2 (2)
1. FC Nürnberg (p) | 2 (4)
Holstein Kiel | 2
SC Freiburg | 1
FC Augsburg (a.e.t.) | 3
Mainz 05 | 2
RB Leipzig | 2
1899 Hoffenheim | 0
Hannover 96 | 0
VfL Wolfsburg | 2
1. FC Köln | 1 (5)
Schalke 04 (p) | 1 (6)
SSV Ulm | 1
Fortuna Düsseldorf | 5
Borussia Dortmund (a.e.t.) | 3
Union Berlin | 2
Weiche Flensburg | 1
Werder Bremen | 5
Darmstadt 98 | 0
Hertha BSC | 2
SV Rödinghausen | 1
Bayern Munich | 2
1. FC Heidenheim | 3
SV Sandhausen | 0
Borussia Mönchengladbach | 0
Bayer Leverkusen | 5

Round of 16; 5–6 February 2019
MSV Duisburg | 1
SC Paderborn | 3
Hamburger SV | 1
1. FC Nürnberg | 0
Holstein Kiel | 0
FC Augsburg | 1
RB Leipzig | 1
VfL Wolfsburg | 0
Schalke 04 | 4
Fortuna Düsseldorf | 1
Borussia Dortmund | 3 (2)
Werder Bremen (p) | 3 (4)
Hertha BSC | 2
Bayern Munich (a.e.t.) | 3
1. FC Heidenheim | 2
Bayer Leverkusen | 1

Quarter-finals; 2–3 April 2019
SC Paderborn | 0
Hamburger SV | 2
FC Augsburg | 1
RB Leipzig (a.e.t.) | 2
Schalke 04 | 0
Werder Bremen | 2
Bayern Munich | 5
1. FC Heidenheim | 4

Semi-finals; 23–24 April 2019
Hamburger SV | 1
RB Leipzig | 3
Werder Bremen | 2
Bayern Munich | 3

Final; 25 May 2019
RB Leipzig | 0
Bayern Munich | 3

== Top goalscorers ==
The following were the top scorers of the DFB-Pokal, sorted first by number of goals, and then alphabetically if necessary. Goals scored in penalty shoot-outs are not included.

| Rank | Player | Team | Goals |
|---|---|---|---|
| 1 | (Poland) Robert Lewandowski | Bayern Munich | 7 |
| 2 | (Germany) Pierre-Michel Lasogga | Hamburger SV | 6 |
| 3 | (Germany) Robert Glatzel | 1. FC Heidenheim | 4 |
| 3 | (Belgium) Dodi Lukebakio | Fortuna Düsseldorf | 4 |
| 3 | (Germany) Simon Terodde | 1. FC Köln | 4 |
| 6 | (Austria) Nikola Dovedan | 1. FC Heidenheim | 3 |
| 6 | (Germany) Marvin Ducksch | Fortuna Düsseldorf | 3 |
| 6 | (Germany) Serge Gnabry | Bayern Munich | 3 |
| 6 | (Austria) Martin Harnik | Werder Bremen | 3 |
| 6 | (Belgium) Thorgan Hazard | Borussia Mönchengladbach | 3 |
| 6 | (Germany) Uwe Hünemeier | SC Paderborn | 3 |
| 6 | (Brazil) Joelinton | 1899 Hoffenheim | 3 |
| 6 | (Germany) Thomas Müller | Bayern Munich | 3 |
| 6 | (France) Alassane Pléa | Borussia Mönchengladbach | 3 |
| 6 | (Brazil) Raffael | Borussia Mönchengladbach | 3 |
| 6 | (Kosovo) Milot Rashica | Werder Bremen | 3 |
| 6 | (Germany) Marco Reus | Borussia Dortmund | 3 |
| 6 | (Germany) Timo Werner | RB Leipzig | 3 |

== Broadcasting rights ==
In Germany, all matches and a simulcast (Konferenz) channel were broadcast live on pay TV via Sky Sport. Selected matches from the first round to the quarter-finals, along with highlights from all matches, were broadcast on free TV by Das Erste's Sportschau live from ARD. Both semi-final matches and the final were broadcast by both Das Erste and Sky Sport.

The following matches were broadcast live on ARD:

| Round | Matches | Ref. |
|---|---|---|
| First round | Greuther Fürth v Borussia Dortmund | |
| Second round | SV Rödinghausen v Bayern Munich; RB Leipzig v 1899 Hoffenheim | |
| Round of 16 | Borussia Dortmund v Werder Bremen; Hertha BSC v Bayern Munich | |
| Quarter-finals | FC Augsburg v RB Leipzig; Schalke 04 v Werder Bremen | |
