= 2022–23 FK Austria Wien season =

FK Austria Wien
2022–23 season
- Chairman: Frank Hensel
- Head coach: Manfred Schmid
- Stadium: Franz Horr Stadium
- Austrian Football Bundesliga: 5th
- Austrian Cup: Third round
- UEFA Europa League: Play-off round
- UEFA Europa Conference League: Group stage
- Top goalscorer: League: Haris Tabaković (17); All: Haris Tabaković (19)
Home colours	Away colours	One-off colours

The 2022–23 season was the 112th in the history of FK Austria Wien and their 74th consecutive season in the top flight. The club participated in the Austrian Football Bundesliga, the Austrian Cup, the UEFA Europa League, and the UEFA Europa Conference League.

== Players ==
As of 30 June 2022

Note: Flags indicate national team as defined under FIFA eligibility rules; some limited exceptions apply. Players may hold more than one non-FIFA nationality.

No.	Pos.	Nation	Player
1	GK	GER	Christian Früchtl
3	DF	BRA	Lucas Galvão
4	DF	AUT	Ziad El Sheiwi
5	DF	ISR	Matan Baltaxa
7	MF	AUT	Can Keles
8	MF	AUS	James Holland
9	FW	AUT	Muharem Huskovic
10	FW	AUT	Marco Djuricin
11	FW	AUT	Manuel Polster
13	GK	AUT	Lukas Wedl
15	DF	AUT	Leonardo Ivkic
17	FW	AUT	Andreas Gruber
20	DF	GER	Lukas Mühl
21	GK	AUT	Ammar Helac
22	MF	AUT	Florian Wustinger

No.	Pos.	Nation	Player
23	MF	AUT	Matthias Braunöder
25	FW	SUI	Haris Tabakovic
26	MF	AUT	Reinhold Ranftl (on loan from Schalke 04)
27	FW	AUT	Romeo Vucic
29	FW	AUT	Marko Raguž
30	MF	AUT	Manfred Fischer
36	FW	AUT	Dominik Fitz
39	MF	AUT	Georg Teigl
46	DF	AUT	Johannes Handl
47	MF	AUT	Dario Kreiker
66	DF	LUX	Marvin da Graça
77	MF	AUT	Aleksandar Jukic
89	DF	FRA	Billy Koumetio (on loan from Liverpool)
99	GK	AUT	Mirko Kos

=== Other players under contract ===
Note: Flags indicate national team as defined under FIFA eligibility rules; some limited exceptions apply. Players may hold more than one non-FIFA nationality.

No.	Pos.	Nation	Player
—	FW	NGR	Bright Edomwonyi

== Pre-season and friendlies ==
Win Draw Loss Fixtures

2 July 2022 Friendly	First Vienna	0–3	Austria Wien	Vienna
17:00 CEST (UTC+2)				Stadium: First Vienna Football Campus

6 July 2022 Friendly	Monaco	2–2	Austria Wien	Lagos
18:00 CEST (UTC+2)	Maripán 14'; Martins 16'		Jukic 6'; Gruber 28'	Stadium: Estádio Municipal Fernando Cabrita

10 January 2023 Friendly	Austria Wien	3–4	Zbrojovka Brno	Vienna
15:00 CEST (UTC+2)		Report		Stadium: Generali Arena

13 January 2023 Friendly	Austria Wien	3–2	Traiskirchen	Vienna
17:30 CEST (UTC+2)		Report		Stadium: Generali Arena - Platz 2

17 January 2023 Friendly	Austria Wien	3–1	Vasas	Belek
13:00 CEST (UTC+2)		Report		Stadium: Calista Sports Center - Field B

20 January 2023 Friendly	Austria Wien	2–1	Shakhtar Donetsk	Belek
15:30 CEST (UTC+2)		Report		Stadium: Titanic Sports Center - Field 1

23 January 2023 Friendly	Austria Wien	0–0	Partizan	Belek
15:30 CEST (UTC+2)		Report		Stadium: Sueno Sports Center - Pitch 1

27 January 2023 Friendly	Austria Wien	2–1	First Vienna	Vienna
15:00 CEST (UTC+2)		Report		Stadium: Generali Arena - Platz 2

3 February 2023 Friendly	Austria Wien	1–1	Floridsdorfer AC	Vienna
15:00 CEST (UTC+2)	Fischer 2'	Report	Goal	Stadium: Generali Arena - Platz 2

== Competitions ==
=== Overall record ===
Competition	First match	Last match	Starting round	Final position	Record							
Competition	First match	Last match	Starting round	Final position	Pld	W	D	L	GF	GA	GD	Win %
Austrian Football Bundesliga	22 July 2022	3 June 2023	Matchday 1	5th	32	11	10	11	55	52	+3	34.38
Austrian Cup	16 July 2022	20 October 2022	First round	Third round	3	2	0	1	13	3	+10	66.67
UEFA Europa League	18 August 2022	25 August 2022	Play-off round	Play-off round	2	0	0	2	1	6	−5	0.00
UEFA Europa Conference League	8 September 2022	3 November 2022	Group stage	Group stage	6	0	2	4	2	15	−13	0.00
Total					43	13	12	18	71	76	−5	30.23

Last updated: 3 June 2023
Source: Soccerway

=== Austrian Football Bundesliga ===
==== League table ====
Pos	Team	Pld	W	D	L	GF	GA	GD	Pts	Qualification
3	LASK	22	10	8	4	38	28	+10	38	Qualification for the Championship round
4	Rapid Wien	22	10	3	9	34	26	+8	33	Qualification for the Championship round
5	Austria Wien	22	10	5	7	37	31	+6	32 (Note: Austria Wien were deducted 3 points due to license violation.)	Qualification for the Championship round
6	Austria Klagenfurt	22	9	3	10	35	40	−5	30	Qualification for the Championship round
7	WSG Tirol	22	8	4	10	32	37	−5	28	Qualification for the Relegation round

Source: Austrian Football Bundesliga
Rules for classification: 1) Points; 2) Head-to-head record; 3) Goal difference; 4) Goals scored; 5) Matches won; 6) Away matches won; 7) Away goals scored.

==== Results summary ====
Overall								Home						Away					
Pld	W	D	L	GF	GA	GD	Pts	W	D	L	GF	GA	GD	W	D	L	GF	GA	GD
32	11	10	11	55	52	+3	43	7	4	5	27	21	+6	4	6	6	28	31	−3

Last updated: 3 June 2022.
Source: Austrian Football Bundesliga

==== Results by round ====
Round	1	2	3	4	5	6	7	8	9	10	11	12	13	14	15	16	17	18	19	20	21	22
Ground	A	H	A	H	A	A	H	A	H	H	A	H	A	H	A	H	H	A	H	A	A	H
Result	L	D	L	W	W	D	D	W	W	L	W	L	D	W	D	L	W	L	W	W	L	W
Position	12	12	12	12	7	8	9	6	5	7	6	6	7	7	7	7	5	5	5	5	5	6

Updated to match(es) played on 19 March 2023. Source: Austrian Football Bundesliga
A = Away; H = Home; W = Win; D = Draw; L = Loss

==== Matches ====
The league fixtures were announced on 22 June 2022.

22 July 2022 1	Red Bull Salzburg	3–0	Austria Wien	Wals-Siezenheim
20:30 CEST (UTC+2)	Šeško 37'; Fernando 56'; Okafor 61'	Report		Stadium: Red Bull Arena; Attendance: 11,156; Referee: Rene Eisner

31 July 2022 2	Austria Wien	1–1	LASK	Vienna
17:00 CEST (UTC+2)	Gruber 88'	Report	Ljubičić 67'	Stadium: Franz Horr Stadium; Attendance: 10,031; Referee: Christian-Petru Ciochirca

7 August 2022 3	Rheindorf Altach	3–2	Austria Wien	Altach
20:00 CEST (UTC+2)	Nuhiu 64', 90+4'; Braunöder 74'	Report	Fischer 19'; Tabaković 53'	Stadium: Stadion Schnabelholz; Referee: Walter Altmann

13 August 2022 4	Austria Wien	2–1	WSG Tirol	Vienna
17:00 CEST (UTC+2)	Tabaković 20'; Lucas Galvão (red card) 33'; Fitz 49'	Report	Prica 58'; Müller (yellow card) 77'	Stadium: Franz Horr Stadium; Attendance: 8,456; Referee: (Austria) Alan Kijas

21 August 2022 5	Wolfsberger AC	1–2	Austria Wien	Wolfsberg
17:00 CEST (UTC+2)	Röcher 16'; Vergos (yellow card) 79'	Report	Ranftl (yellow card) 35'; Gruber 36'; Djuricin 65' (yellow card) 90+5'	Stadium: Lavanttal-Arena; Attendance: 3,350; Referee: (Austria) Chiristian-Petru Ciochirca

28 August 2022 6	Austria Klagenfurt	3–3	Austria Wien	Klagenfurt am Wörthersee
17:00 CEST (UTC+2)	Pink 3' (yellow card) 40'; Rieder 46' (yellow card) 79'; Blauensteiner (yellow card) 56'; Irving 87' (pen.)	Report	Braunöder 45+4'; Ranftl 53' (yellow card) 89'; Keles 76'; Teigl (yellow card) 90+2'	Stadium: 28 Black Arena; Attendance: 3,607; Referee: (Austria) Markus Hameter

3 September 2022 7	Austria Wien	2–2	Austria Lustenau	Vienna
17:00 CEST (UTC+2)	Ranftl 4'; Lucas Galvão (yellow card) 24'; Jukic 56'; Teigl (yellow card) 90+6'	Report	Surdanovic (yellow card) 25' (yellow-red card) 87'; Fridrikas 27'; Anderson 34'; Schierl (yellow card) 90+3'	Stadium: Franz Horr Stadium; Attendance: 9,383; Referee: (Austria) Andreas Heiß

==== Championship round ====
Pos	Team	Pld	W	D	L	GF	GA	GD	Pts	Qualification	RBS	STU	LIN	RWI	AWI	KLA
2	Sturm Graz	32	20	6	6	57	29	+28	42	Qualification for the Champions League third qualifying round	0–2	—	2–0	3–1	3–2	4–1
3	LASK	32	14	12	6	54	38	+16	35	Qualification for the Europa League play-off round	0–1	2–1	—	3–1	3–1	4–0
4	Rapid Wien	32	12	6	14	50	47	+3	25	Qualification for the Europa Conference League third qualifying round	1–1	3–2	1–1	—	3–3	3–1
5	Austria Wien (O)	32	11	10	11	55	52	+3	24	Qualification for the Europa Conference League play-offs	1–1	1–2	2–2	3–1	—	1–2
6	Austria Klagenfurt	32	11	5	16	45	63	−18	23		0–3	0–2	1–1	2–1	1–1	—

Source: Austrian Football Bundesliga
Legend: Blue = home team win; Yellow = draw; Red = away team win.
Rules for classification: 1) Points; 2) Points with (possible) half points subtracted due to rounding; 3) Head-to-head points; 4) Head-to-head goal difference; 5) Head-to-head goals scored; 6) Head-to-head away goals scored; 7) Goal difference; 8) Goals scored; 9) Matches won; 10) Away matches won; 11) Away goals scored.
(O) Play-off winners

=== Austrian Cup ===
16 July 2022 First round	FC Wels	0–7	Austria Wien	Wels
17:15 CEST (UTC+2)		Report	Fischer 11', 25', 56', 74', (yellow card) 61'; Jukic 12', 51', 55'	Stadium: HUBER Arena; Attendance: 1,900; Referee: Markus Hameter

31 August 2022 Second round	ASV Siegendorf 1930	0–5	Austria Wien	Vienna
20:30 CEST (UTC+2)		Report	Gruber 6', 28'; Tabakovic 30'; Fitz 39'; Jukic 78'	Stadium: Hohe Warte Stadium; Attendance: 2,107; Referee: Alexander Harkam

20 October 2022 Third round	Wiener Sport-Club	3–1	Austria Wien	Vienna
20:30	Vučenović 22' (Pajaczkowski); Haas (yellow card) 53'; Rajkovic 61' (Pajaczkowski); Andrejević (yellow card) 65'; Beljan 86' (Rajkovic)	Report	Fitz 26' (pen.); Polster (yellow card) 33'; Fischer (yellow card) 63'; Galvão (yellow card) 65'	Stadium: Sportklub Stadium; Attendance: 6,000; Referee: Harald Lechner

=== UEFA Europa League ===
==== Play-off round ====
The draw for the play-off round was held on 2 August 2022.

18 August 2022 First leg	Austria Wien	0–2	(Turkey) Fenerbahçe	Vienna, Austria
21:00 CEST (UTC+2)	Galvão (yellow card) 49' (yellow-red card) 83'; Früchtl (yellow card) 90'	Report	King 8'; Alioski (yellow card) 31'; Yüksek (yellow card) 73'; Dursun 89'	Stadium: Franz Horr Stadium; Attendance: 14,000; Referee: Daniel Siebert (Germany)

25 August 2022 Second leg	Fenerbahçe (Turkey)	4–1 (6–1 agg.)	Austria Wien	Istanbul, Turkey
20:00 TRT (UTC+3)	Yüksek 8'; Kahveci 44', 70'; Yandaş 79'	Report	Da Graça (yellow card) 30', (goal) 45+1'; Kreiker (yellow card) 82'	Stadium: Şükrü Saracoğlu Stadium; Attendance: 35,350; Referee: Jesús Gil Manzano (Spain)

=== UEFA Europa Conference League ===
==== Group stage ====
The draw for the group stage was held on 26 August 2022.

Pos	Team	Pld	W	D	L	GF	GA	GD	Pts	Qualification	VIL	LCH	HBS	AW
1	(Spain) Villarreal	6	4	1	1	14	9	+5	13	Advance to round of 16	—	4–3	2–2	5–0
2	(Poland) Lech Poznań	6	2	3	1	12	7	+5	9	Advance to knockout round play-offs	3–0	—	0–0	4–1
3	(Israel) Hapoel Be'er Sheva	6	1	4	1	8	5	+3	7		1–2	1–1	—	4–0
4	Austria Wien	6	0	2	4	2	15	−13	2		0–1	1–1	0–0	—

Source: UEFA
Rules for classification: Group stage tiebreakers

8 September 2022 1	Austria Wien	0–0	(Israel) Hapoel Be'er Sheva	Vienna
18:45		Report		Stadium: Franz Horr Stadium; Attendance: 9,400; Referee: Horațiu Feșnic (Romania)

15 September 2022 2	Lech Poznań (Poland)	4–1	Austria Wien	Poznań, Poland
21:00	Ishak 27'; Skóraś 64'; Velde 76', 90'	Report	Braunöder 29'	Stadium: Stadion Poznań; Attendance: 20,102; Referee: Peter Kjærsgaard (Denmark)

6 October 2022 3	Villarreal (Spain)	5–0	Austria Wien	Valencia, Spain
21:00	Baena 18'; Danjuma 43'; Morales 76', 80', 88'	Report		Stadium: Ciutat de València; Attendance: 9,539; Referee: Jochem Kamphuis (Netherlands)

13 October 2022 4	Austria Wien	0–1	(Spain) Villarreal	Vienna
18:45		Report	Jackson 87'	Stadium: Franz Horr Stadium; Attendance: 11,000; Referee: Georgi Kabakov (Bulgaria)

27 October 2022 5	Austria Wien	1–1	(Poland) Lech Poznań	Vienna
18:45	Keles 70'	Report	Ishak 48'	Stadium: Franz Horr Stadium; Attendance: 12,211; Referee: Darren England (England)

3 November 2022 6	Hapoel Be'er Sheva (Israel)	4–0	Austria Wien	Be'er Sheva, Israel
22:00	Jehezkel 29'; Safouri 33'; Shechter 63'; Handl 73' (o.g.)	Report		Stadium: Turner Stadium; Attendance: 12,500; Referee: Elchin Masiyev (Azerbaijan)
