= Fejzullahu =

Fejzullahu is an Albanian surname. Notable people with the name include:

- Arbnor Fejzullahu (born 1993), Albanian footballer
- Ermal Fejzullahu (born 1988), Albanian singer from Kosovo
- Erton Fejzullahu (born 1988), Swedish-Kosovar footballer of Albanian descent
- Mërgim Fejzullahu (born 1994), Albanian professional footballer
