= Can Keleş =

Austrian association footballer (born 2001)

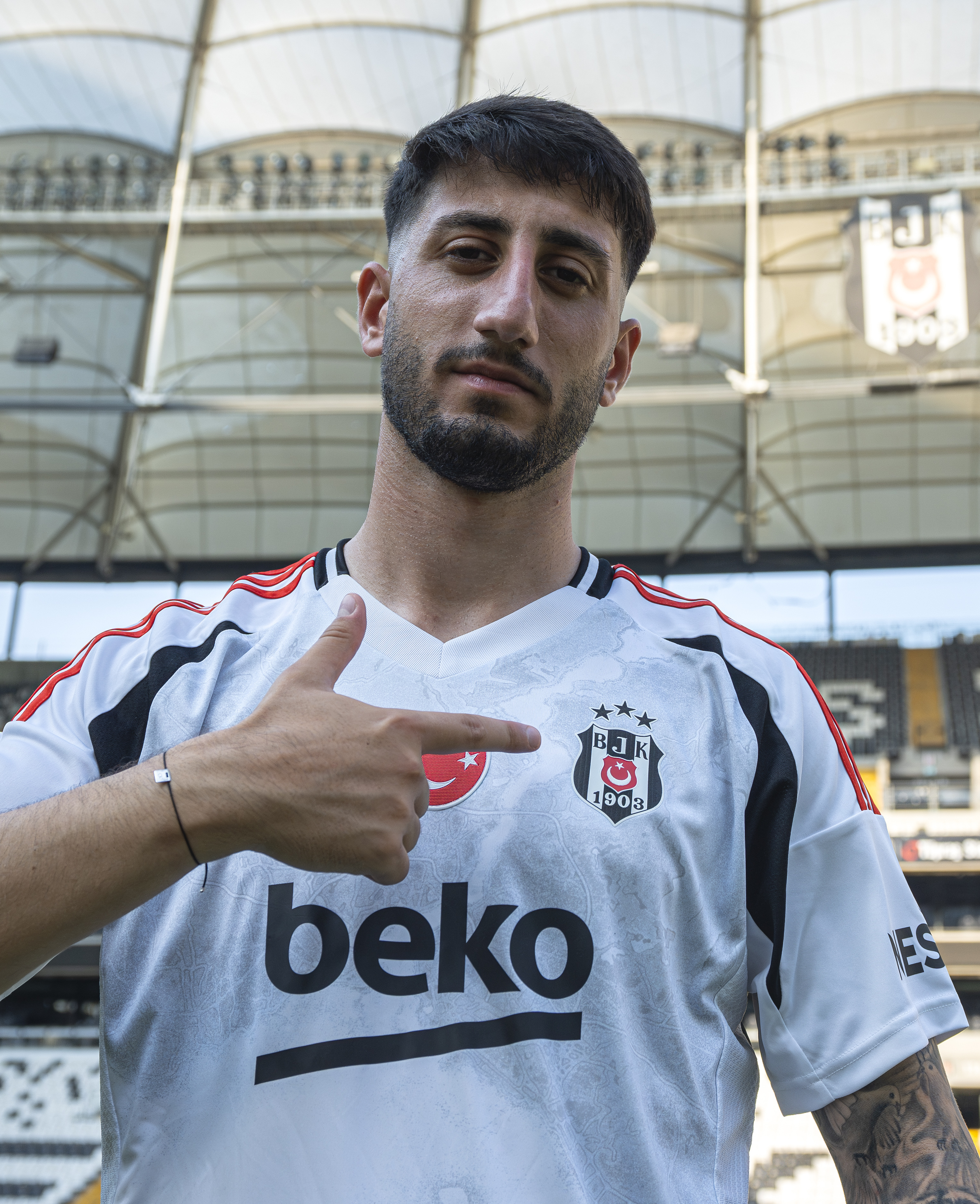
- Keleş with Beşiktaş in 2024

Personal information
- Date of birth: 2 September 2001 (age 25)
- Place of birth: Vienna, Austria
- Height: 1.80 m (5 ft 11 in)
- Position: Winger

Team information
- Current team: Beşiktaş
- Number: 77

Youth career
- 2007–2010: Haidbrunn-Wacker
- 2010–2012: Wiener Neustädter
- 2012–2013: Rapid Wien
- 2013–2020: Austria Wien

Senior career*
| Years | Team | Apps | (Gls) |
| 2020–2022 | Austria Wien II | 39 | (6) |
| 2021–2024 | Austria Wien | 38 | (6) |
| 2023 | → Fatih Karagümrük (loan) | 35 | (5) |
| 2024– | Beşiktaş | 3 | (0) |
| 2025 | → Kasımpaşa (loan) | 16 | (3) |
| 2025–2026 | → Kocaelispor (loan) | 24 | (0) |

International career^{‡}
| 2017 | Austria U16 | 2 | (0) |
| 2017–2018 | Austria U17 | 11 | (1) |
| 2019 | Austria U18 | 2 | (1) |
- * Club domestic league appearances and goals as of 30 June 2026 ‡ National team caps and goals as of 01:40, 8 May 2023 (UTC)

Can Keleş (born 2 September 2001) is an Austrian professional footballer who plays as a winger for Süper Lig club Beşiktaş.

== Club career ==
Keleş is a youth product of Haidbrunn-Wacker, Wiener Neustädter, and Rapid Wien before joining Austria Wien's youth academy in 2013. He signed his first professional contract with the club on 21 August 2020, initially assigned to their reserves. He made his senior debut with Austria Wien in a 4–0 Austrian Cup win over Spittal on 17 July 2021. On 21 March 2022, he extended his contract with Austria Wien keeping him at the club until 2026.

On 22 July 2024, Keleş signed a four-year deal with Süper Lig club Beşiktaş.

On 25 January 2025, Keleş was loaned to Kasımpaşa until the end of the season.

On 13 August 2025, Keleş was loaned to Kocaelispor until the end of the season.

== International career ==
Born in Austria, Keleş is of Turkish descent. He is a youth international for Austria, having represented the Austria U16s, U17s, and U18s. He was called up to the Austria 21s in March 2022.

== Career statistics ==
As of match played 25 May 2024

Appearances and goals by club, season and competition
| Club | Season | League | | | National cup (Note: Includes Austrian Cup, Turkish Cup) | | Europe | | Total | |
| Club | Season | Division | Apps | Goals | Apps | Goals | Apps | Goals | Apps | Goals |
|---|---|---|---|---|---|---|---|---|---|---|
| Austria Wien | 2021–22 | Austrian Bundesliga | 20 | 3 | 2 | 0 | 1 (Note: Appearance in UEFA Europa Conference League) | 0 | 23 | 3 |
| Austria Wien | 2022–23 | Austrian Bundesliga | 18 | 3 | 3 | 0 | 8 (Note: Two appearances in UEFA Europa League, six appearances and one goal in UEFA Europa Conference League) | 1 | 29 | 4 |
| Austria Wien | Total | | 38 | 6 | 5 | 0 | 9 | 1 | 52 | 7 |
| Fatih Karagümrük (loan) | 2023–24 | Süper Lig | 35 | 5 | 4 | 0 | — | | 39 | 5 |
| Beşiktaş | 2024–25 | Süper Lig | 0 | 0 | 0 | 0 | 0 | 0 | 0 | 0 |
| Career total | | | 73 | 11 | 9 | 0 | 9 | 1 | 91 | 12 |

== Honours ==
Beşiktaş

- Turkish Super Cup: 2024
