= Lukas Mühl =

German footballer

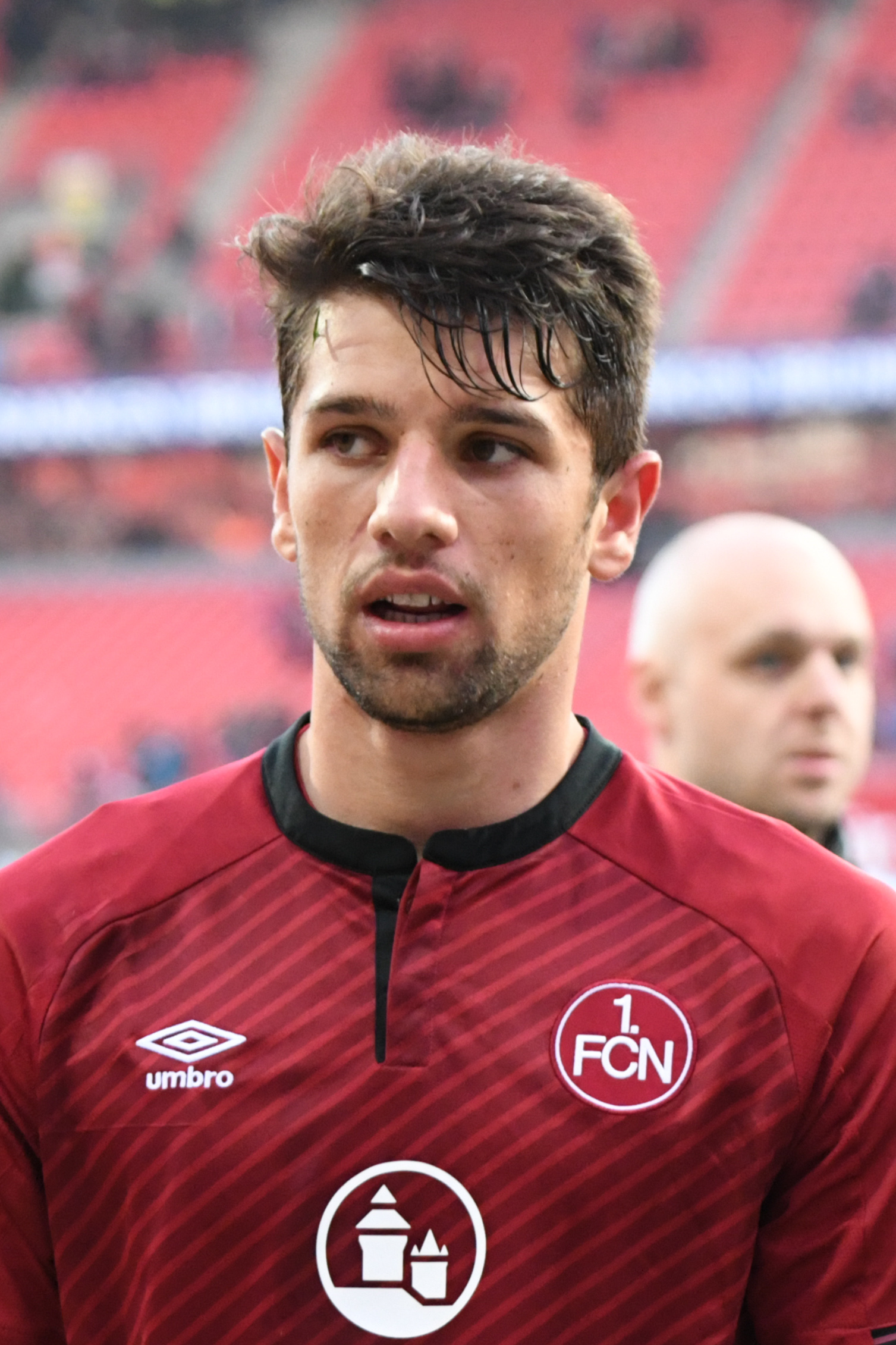
- Mühl in 2019

Personal information
- Date of birth: 27 January 1997 (age 29)
- Place of birth: Zwiesel, Germany
- Height: 1.89 m (6 ft 2 in)
- Position: Centre back

Team information
- Current team: Jahn Regensburg
- Number: 5

Youth career
- TSV Regen
- 2011–2016: 1. FC Nürnberg

Senior career*
Years	Team	Apps	(Gls)
2016–2017	1. FC Nürnberg II	12	(2)
2016–2021	1. FC Nürnberg	123	(3)
2021–2023	Austria Wien	55	(1)
2023–2024	Spezia	14	(1)
2024–2026	FC Winterthur	32	(0)
2026–	Jahn Regensburg	0	(0)

International career
2016–2018	Germany U20	7	(0)
- * Club domestic league appearances and goals as of 18:36, 24 September 2026 (UTC)

Lukas Mühl (born 27 January 1997) is a German professional footballer who plays as a centre back for 3. Liga club Jahn Regensburg.

== Club career ==
On 4 August 2023, Mühl signed a two-year deal with Spezia in the Italian Serie B. The contract was terminated by mutual consent on 30 August 2024.

On 2 September 2024, Mühl signed a two-year contract with Winterthur in Switzerland.

His contract with Winterthur ended in summer 2026. On 24 September 2026, he joined Jahn Regensburg.

== International career ==
Mühl was a youth international for Germany at the U20 level.

== Career statistics ==
=== Club ===
As of 24 September 2026

Club	Season	League			Cup		Continental		Other		Total	
Club	Season	Division	Apps	Goals	Apps	Goals	Apps	Goals	Apps	Goals	Apps	Goals
Nürnberg	2015–16	2. Bundesliga	1	0	—		—		—		1	0
Nürnberg	2016–17	2. Bundesliga	24	1	1	0	—		—		25	1
Nürnberg	2017–18	2. Bundesliga	18	0	1	0	—		—		19	0
Nürnberg	2018–19	Bundesliga	31	1	3	0	—		—		34	1
Nürnberg	2019–20	2. Bundesliga	21	0	2	0	—		—		23	0
Nürnberg	2020–21	2. Bundesliga	30	1	1	0	—		—		31	1
Nürnberg	Total		125	3	8	0	—		—		133	3
Austria Wien	2021–22	Austrian Bundesliga	29	1	1	0	1	0	—		31	1
Austria Wien	2022–23	Austrian Bundesliga	26	0	1	0	5	0	—		32	0
Austria Wien	Total		55	1	2	0	6	0	—		63	1
Spezia	2023–24	Serie B	14	1	1	0	—		—		15	1
Spezia	Total		14	1	1	0	—		—		15	1
Winterthur	2024–25	Swiss Super League	15	0	1	0	—		—		16	1
Winterthur	2025–26	Swiss Super League	17	0	0	0	—		—		17	0
Winterthur	Total		32	0	1	0	—		—		33	0
Regensburg	2026–27	3. Liga	0	0	0	0	—		—		0	0
Regensburg	Total		0	0	0	0	—		—		0	0
Career total			226	5	12	0	6	0	0	0	244	5
