= Matthias Braunöder =

Austrian association footballer

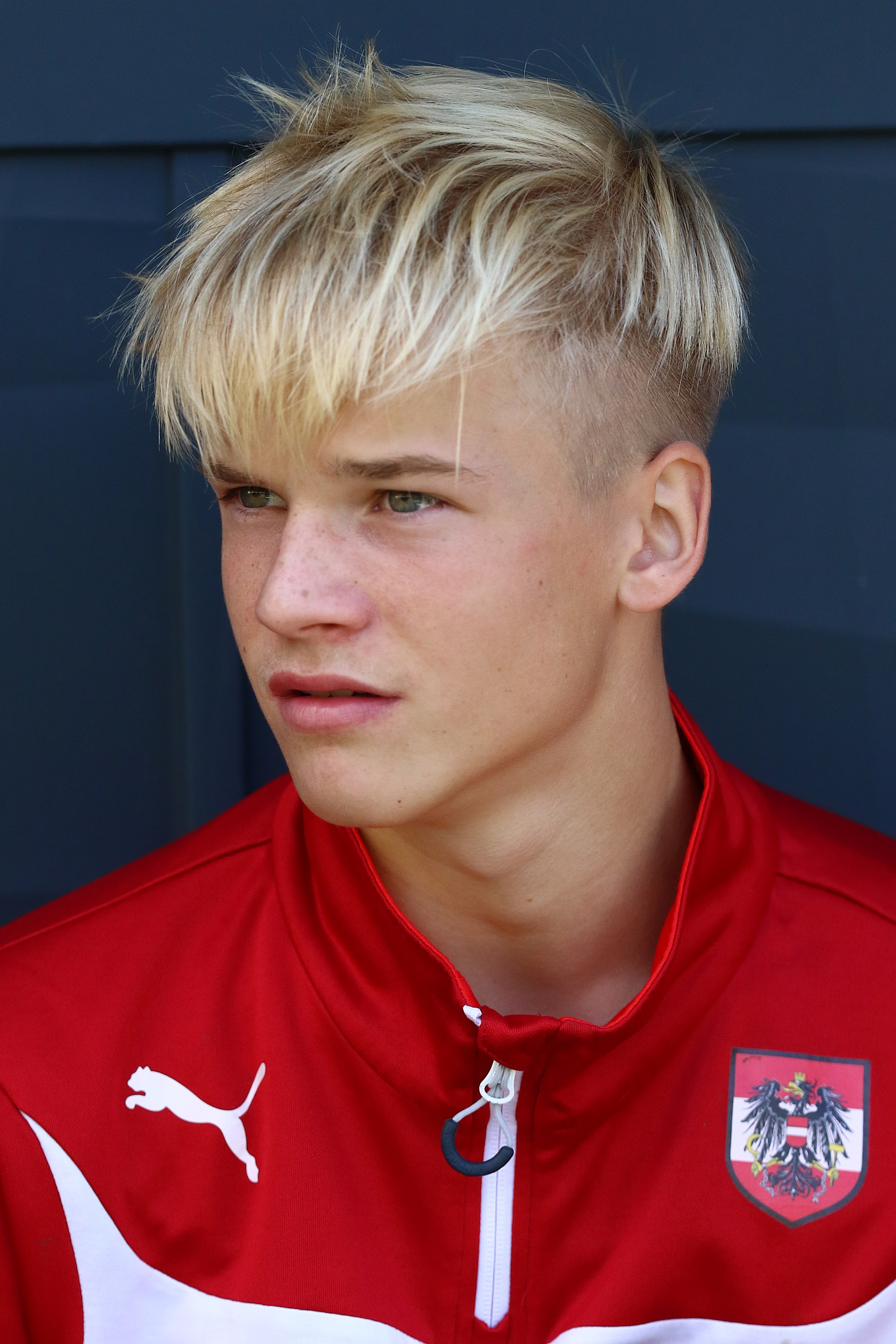
- Braunöder in 2018

Personal information
- Date of birth: 27 March 2002 (age 24)
- Place of birth: Eisenstadt, Austria
- Height: 1.72 m (5 ft 8 in)
- Position: Midfielder

Team information
- Current team: Carrarese
- Number: 23

Youth career
- 2009–2011: SV Sigleß
- 2011–2019: Austria Wien

Senior career*
Years	Team	Apps	(Gls)
2019–2021	Austria Wien II	41	(2)
2021–2024	Austria Wien	77	(3)
2024	→ Como (loan)	13	(1)
2024–2026	Como	8	(0)
2025–2026	→ Bari (loan)	31	(0)
2026–	Carrarese	2	(0)

International career^{‡}
2017	Austria U15	2	(0)
2017–2018	Austria U16	8	(1)
2018–2019	Austria U17	14	(2)
2019–2020	Austria U18	6	(2)
2021–2024	Austria U21	25	(2)
- * Club domestic league appearances and goals as of 19 September 2026 ‡ National team caps and goals as of 15 October 2024

Matthias Braunöder (born 27 March 2002) is an Austrian professional footballer who plays as a midfielder for Serie B club Carrarese.

== Club career ==
Braunöder is a youth product of SV Sigleß, before joining Austria Wien's youth academy in 2011. In 2019, he started training with Austria Wien's reserves. He signed a professional contract with the club on 3 June 2019. He made his professional debut with Austria Wien in a 4–0 Austrian Football Bundesliga win over Admira Wacker on 26 January 2021. He was named the inaugural winner for the "Newcomer of the Season" award for the 2021–22 Austrian Football Bundesliga season.

On 25 January 2024, Braunöder joined Como in Italy on loan with an option to buy.

On 6 August 2025, Braunöder moved on loan to Bari in Serie B.

== International career ==
Braunöder is a youth international for Austria, having represented them at various levels from U15 to U21. He captained the Austria U17s at the 2019 UEFA European Under-17 Championship.

== Career statistics ==
As of match played 30 December 2024

Appearances and goals by club, season and competition
Club	Season	League			Cup		Europe		Other		Total	
Club	Season	Division	Apps	Goals	Apps	Goals	Apps	Goals	Apps	Goals	Apps	Goals
Austria Wien II	2019–20	Austrian Football Second League	12	0	—		—		—		12	0
Austria Wien II	2020–21	Austrian Football Second League	28	2	—		—		—		28	2
Austria Wien II	2021–22	Austrian Football Second League	1	0	—		—		—		1	0
Austria Wien II	Total		41	2	—		—		—		41	2
Austria Wien	2020–21	Austrian Bundesliga	1	0	0	0	—		—		1	0
Austria Wien	2021–22	Austrian Bundesliga	27	1	2	0	—		—		29	1
Austria Wien	2022–23	Austrian Bundesliga	33	2	3	0	8 (Note: Six appearances and one goal in UEFA Europa Conference League, two appearances in UEFA Europa League)	1	—		44	3
Austria Wien	2023–24	Austrian Bundesliga	16	0	3	0	4 (Note: Appearances in UEFA Europa Conference League)	0	—		23	0
Austria Wien	Total		77	3	8	0	12	1	0	0	97	4
Como (loan)	2023–24	Serie B	13	1	—		—		—		13	1
Como	2024–25	Serie A	8	0	1	0	—		—		9	0
Career total			139	6	9	0	12	1	0	0	160	7

== Personal life ==
Braunöder's father, Markus, was also a professional footballer in Austria.
