= Christian Schoissengeyr =

Dominican footballer

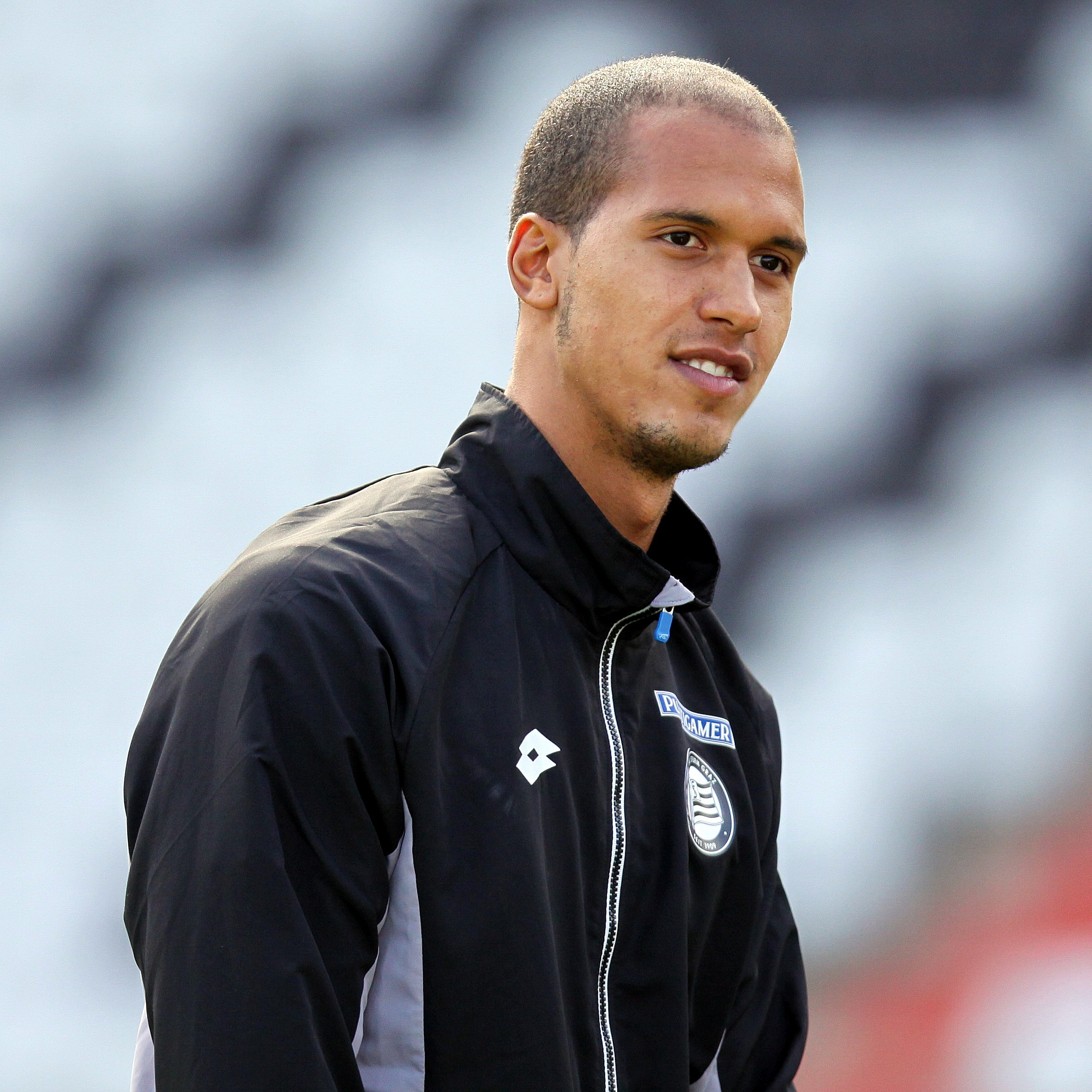

Personal information
- Full name: Christian Junior Schoissengeyr Acosta
- Date of birth: 18 October 1994 (age 32)
- Place of birth: La Vega, Dominican Republic
- Height: 1.95 m (6 ft 5 in)
- Position: Defender

Team information
- Current team: Floridsdorfer AC
- Number: 24

Youth career
- 2002–2010: ASKÖ Donau Linz
- 2010–2012: Rapid Wien

Senior career*
Years	Team	Apps	(Gls)
2011–2015	Rapid Wien II	56	(3)
2015–2018	Sturm Graz	24	(4)
2015–2018	Sturm Graz II	18	(1)
2018–2022	Austria Wien	37	(1)
2020–2021	Austria Wien II	20	(0)
2022–2023	Domžale	16	(0)
2024	Differdange 03	9	(2)
2025-	Floridsdorfer AC	1	(0)

International career^{‡}
2011	Austria U17	1	(0)
2015–2016	Austria U21	12	(1)
2022-	Dominican Republic	10	(0)
- * Club domestic league appearances and goals as of 11 March 2024 ‡ National team caps and goals as of 19 November 2024

Christian Junior Schoissengeyr Acosta (born 18 October 1994) is a Dominican professional footballer who plays for Floridsdorfer AC.

== Club career ==
On 9 May 2018, Schoissengeyr won the 2017–18 Austrian Cup with Sturm Graz, defeating Red Bull Salzburg 1–0 after extra time.

On 15 June 2022, he signed a one-year contract with Slovenian PrvaLiga side Domžale.

On 28 January 2025, Schoissengeyr signed with Floridsdorfer AC. After just one game, he suffered a serious knee injury.

== International career ==
Schoissengeyr was born in the Dominican Republic to an Austrian father and a Dominican mother and moved to Austria at the age of 3. He represented Austria at the under-17 and under-21 levels.

He received his first senior call up for the Dominican Republic in late October 2017 for two friendlies against Nicaragua the next month.

== Honours ==
Sturm Graz

- Austrian Cup: 2017–18
