= 2024–25 FC Winterthur season =

FC Winterthur
2024–25 season
- Manager: Ognjen Zaric
- Stadium: Schützenwiese
- Swiss Super League: 6th
- Swiss Cup: Pre-season

The 2024–25 season is the 129th season in the history of FC Winterthur, and the club's second consecutive season in the Swiss Super League. In addition to the domestic league, the team is scheduled to participate in the Swiss Cup.

== Transfers ==
=== In ===
Pos.	Player	Transferred from	Fee	Date	Source
MF	(Switzerland) Albin Krasniqi	(Switzerland) St. Gallen U21	Free	1 July 2024	
GK	(Switzerland) Antonio Spagnoli	(Switzerland) Basel II U21	Undisclosed	1 July 2024	
FW	(Switzerland) Elias Maluvunu	(Switzerland) BSC Young Boys U21	Undisclosed	1 July 2024	
DF	(Switzerland) Adrian Durrer	(Switzerland) FC Lugano	Undisclosed	1 July 2024	
FW	(Switzerland) Fabian Rohner	(Switzerland) FC Zürich	Undisclosed	1 July 2024	
FW	(Senegal) Christian Gomis	(Switzerland) Stade Nyonnais	Undisclosed	9 July 2024	

=== Out ===
Pos.	Player	Transferred to	Fee	Date	Source
MF	(Switzerland) Noe Holenstein	(Switzerland) Schaffhausen	Loan	15 July 2024	

== Friendlies ==
=== Pre-season ===
25 June 2024 Friendly	Winterthur (Switzerland)	4–1	(Switzerland) Baden
18:00

28 June 2024 Friendly	Winterthur (Switzerland)	3–2	(Switzerland) FC Rapperswil-Jona
18:00

2 July 2024 Friendly	Eintracht Braunschweig (Germany)	0–1	(Switzerland) Winterthur
18:00

5 July 2024 Friendly	Winterthur (Switzerland)	4–0	(Austria) FC Kufstein
18:00

10 July 2024 Friendly	Winterthur (Switzerland)	5–0	(Switzerland) Young Fellows Juventus
18:00

13 July 2024 Friendly	Winterthur (Switzerland)	1–0	Austria Lustenau
17:00	Burkart 77'

== Competitions ==
=== Overall record ===
Competition	First match	Last match	Starting round	Record							
Competition	First match	Last match	Starting round	Pld	W	D	L	GF	GA	GD	Win %
Swiss Super League	20 July 2024	22–24 May 2025	Matchday 1	3	1	1	1	3	4	−1	33.33
Swiss Cup	16 August 2024			0	0	0	0	0	0	+0	—
Total				3	1	1	1	3	4	−1	33.33

Last updated: 4 August 2024
Source: Soccerway

=== Swiss Super League ===
==== League table ====
Pos	Team	Pld	W	D	L	GF	GA	GD	Pts	Qualification or relegation (Note: Teams play each other three times (33 matches), before the league is split into two groups (the top six and the bottom six).)
8	St. Gallen	38	13	13	12	52	53	−1	52	
9	Sion	38	11	11	16	47	57	−10	44	
10	Winterthur	38	11	7	20	43	68	−25	40	
11	Grasshopper (O)	38	9	12	17	43	53	−10	39	Qualification for the Relegation play-off
12	Yverdon-Sport (R)	38	9	12	17	40	68	−28	39	Relegation to Swiss Challenge League

Source: Swiss Super League
Rules for classification: 1) Points; 2) Goal difference; 3) Goals scored; 4) Head-to-head goal difference; 5) Head-to-head goals scored 6) Away goals scored; 7) Draw.
(O) Play-off winners; (R) Relegated

==== Results summary ====
Overall								Home						Away					
Pld	W	D	L	GF	GA	GD	Pts	W	D	L	GF	GA	GD	W	D	L	GF	GA	GD
3	1	1	1	3	4	−1	4	1	1	0	1	0	+1	0	0	1	2	4	−2

Last updated: 4 August 2024.

==== Results by round ====
Round	1	2	3
Ground	H	A	H
Result	W	L	D
Position	6		

Updated to match(es) played on 4 August 2024. Source:
A = Away; H = Home; W = Win; D = Draw; L = Loss

==== Matches ====
The match schedule was released on 18 June 2024.

20 July 2024 1	Winterthur	1–0	St. Gallen	Winterthur
20:30	Rohner (yellow card) 25'; Di Giusto 70'		Görtler (yellow card) 76'; Quintillà (yellow card) 89'	Stadium: Schützenwiese; Referee: Sven Wolfensberger

28 July 2024 2	Zürich	4–2	Winterthur	Zürich
16:30 UTC+2	Krasniqi 13'; Okoflex (yellow card) 26'; Katić 32'; Marchesano 59' (pen.); Okita (yellow card) 86'; Perea 90+5'		Di Giusto 30', 51'; Arnold (yellow card) 57' (yellow-red card) 82'	Stadium: Letzigrund; Attendance: 15,242; Referee: Luca Cibelli

4 August 2024 3	Winterthur	0–0	Yverdon-Sport	Winterthur
16:30				Stadium: Schützenwiese; Attendance: 7,125; Referee: Luca Piccolo

=== Swiss Cup ===
16 August 2024	FC Wettswil Bonstetten	v	Winterthur	TBD
20:00
