= Niels Hahn =

Austrian footballer

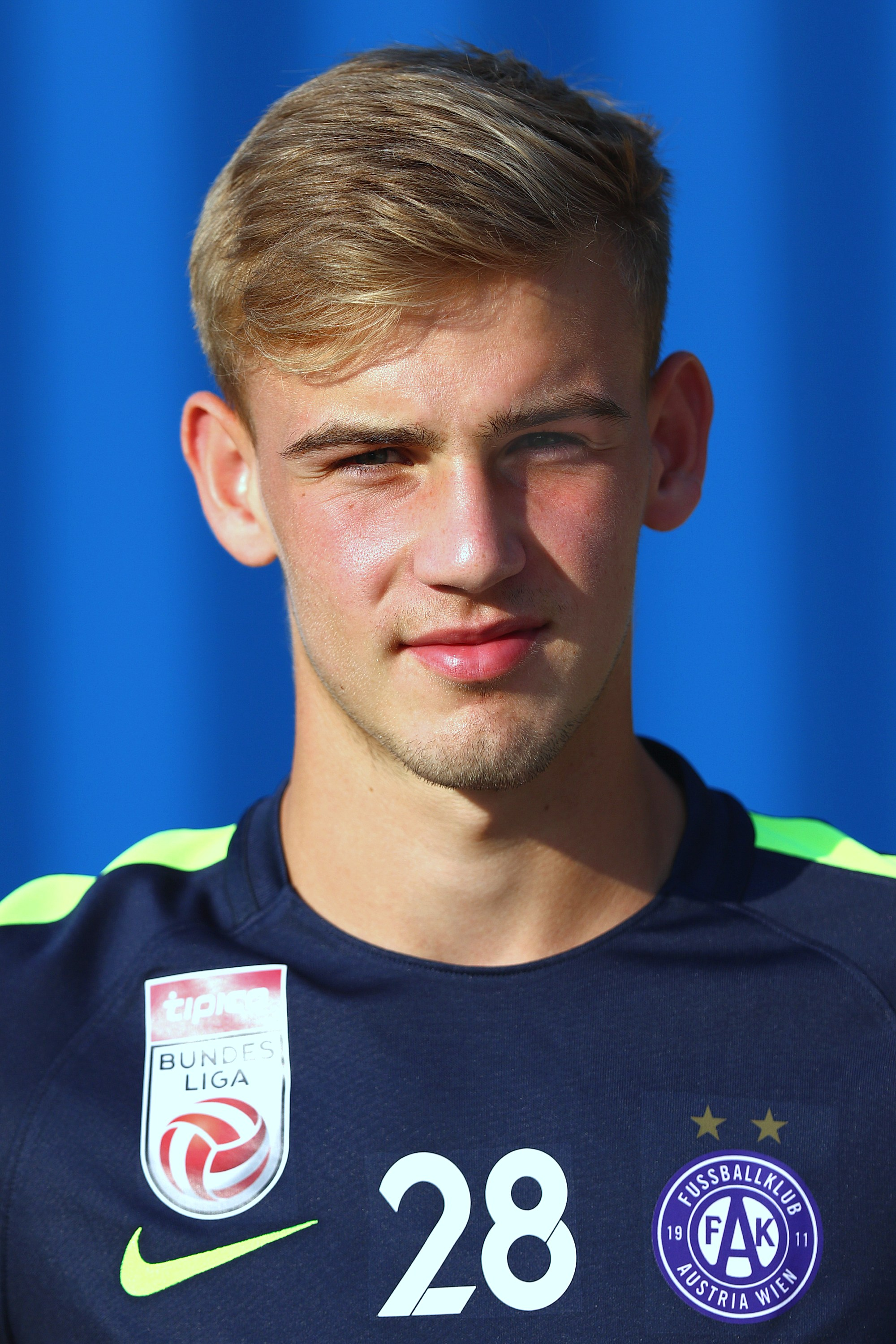
- Hahn with Austria Wien II in August 2018

Personal information
- Date of birth: 24 May 2001 (age 25)
- Place of birth: Austria
- Height: 1.76 m (5 ft 9 in)
- Position: Midfielder

Team information
- Current team: SKU Amstetten
- Number: 8

Youth career
- –2018: Austria Wien

Senior career*
Years	Team	Apps	(Gls)
2018–2023	Young Violets	126	(11)
2018–2021	Austria Wien	6	(0)
2023–	SKU Amstetten	44	(3)

International career^{‡}
2015–2016	Austria U15	10	(2)
2016–2017	Austria U16	9	(1)
2017–2018	Austria U17	12	(0)
2019	Austria U18	2	(1)
2019–2020	Austria U19	9	(0)
- * Club domestic league appearances and goals as of 12 June 2025 ‡ National team caps and goals as of 4 September 2020

Niels Hahn (born 24 May 2001) is an Austrian professional footballer who plays as midfielder for 2. Liga club SKU Amstetten.
