= Esad Bejic =

Austrian footballer

Personal information
- Date of birth: 3 March 2001 (age 25)
- Place of birth: Austria
- Height: 1.80 m (5 ft 11 in)
- Position: Centre-back

Team information
- Current team: Young Violets
- Number: 23

Youth career
- 2009–2014: FC Stadlau
- 2014–2017: Austria Wien

Senior career*
| Years | Team | Apps | (Gls) |
| 2017– | Young Violets | 26 | (0) |
| 2021 | Austria Wien | 1 | (0) |

International career^{‡}
| 2016 | Austria U15 | 8 | (1) |
| 2016–2017 | Austria U16 | 11 | (1) |
| 2017–2018 | Austria U17 | 6 | (1) |
- * Club domestic league appearances and goals as of 28 December 2024 ‡ National team caps and goals as of 27 March 2018

Esad Bejic (Serbian: Esad Bejić, Albanian: Esad Bejiqi; born 3 March 2001) is an Austrian footballer who plays as a centre-back for Austrian club Young Violets, the reserve squad of Austria Wien.

== Club career ==
On 17 July 2021, Bejic was named as an Austria Wien substitute for the first time in a 2021–22 Austrian Cup first round match against SV Spittal. His debut with Austria Wien came on 26 September in an Austrian Bundesliga match against TSV Hartberg after being named in the starting line-up.

== International career ==
Bejic was born in Austria to Albanian parents from Preševo. He from 2016, until 2018 has been part of Austria at youth international level, respectively has been part of the U15, U16 and U17 teams and he with these teams played 25 matches and scored 3 goals.
