= Dario Kreiker =

Austrian association footballer

Personal information
- Date of birth: 7 January 2003 (age 23)
- Place of birth: Austria
- Height: 1.85 m (6 ft 1 in)
- Position: Midfielder

Team information
- Current team: Dukla Prague
- Number: 47

Youth career
- 2007–2009: Bad Vöslau
- 2009–2011: Admira Wacker
- 2011–2016: Rapid Wien
- 2016–2018: Admira Wacker
- 2018–2019: AKA Burgenland

Senior career*
Years	Team	Apps	(Gls)
2019	Wiener Neustädt II	9	(0)
2019–2021	Ortmann	18	(1)
2021–2025	Austria Wien II	28	(3)
2022–2025	Austria Wien	6	(0)
2023–2025	→ SV Stripfing (loan)	41	(2)
2025	SV Stripfing	12	(2)
2026–	Dukla Prague	13	(2)
- * Club domestic league appearances and goals as of 15 May 2026

Dario Kreiker (born 7 January 2003) is an Austrian professional footballer who plays as a midfielder for Czech First League club Dukla Prague.

== Career ==
Kreiker is a youth product of Bad Vöslau, Admira Wacker, Rapid Wien, and AKA Burgenland. He began his senior career with the reserves of Wiener Neustädt in 2019, before a stint with the sixth division side Ortmann before leaving in 2021 after COVID-19 ended the season early. He moved to the reserves of Austria Wien in 2021. He was promoted to their senior team in January 2022. He made his senior debut with Austria Wien in a 2–0 Austrian Football Bundesliga win over Hartberg on 19 February 2022. He signed his first professional contract with the club on 22 March 2022.

On 4 December 2025, Kreiker signed a contract with Czech First League club Dukla Prague.

== Personal life ==
Kreiker's father Mario was also a professional footballer in Austria.
