= Jonas Hildebrandt =

German footballer

Personal information
- Date of birth: 8 December 1996 (age 29)
- Place of birth: Frankfurt (Oder), Germany
- Height: 1.84 m (6 ft 0 in)
- Position: Defensive midfielder

Team information
- Current team: Energie Cottbus (assistant coach)

Youth career
- Frankfurter FC Viktoria
- –2013: Energie Cottbus
- 2013–2015: RB Leipzig

Senior career*
Years	Team	Apps	(Gls)
2015	RB Leipzig II	0	(0)
2016	Optik Rathenow	14	(1)
2016–2018	1. FC Köln II	58	(9)
2018–2020	Hansa Rostock	31	(1)
2020–2021	Rot-Weiss Essen	16	(0)
2021–2024	Energie Cottbus	95	(15)

Managerial career
- 2024–: Energie Cottbus (assistant)
- * Club domestic league appearances and goals

Jonas Hildebrandt (born 8 December 1996) is a German professional football coach and a former player who played as a defensive midfielder. He is an assistant coach with Energie Cottbus.
