= Lukas Wedl =

Austrian footballer (born 1995)

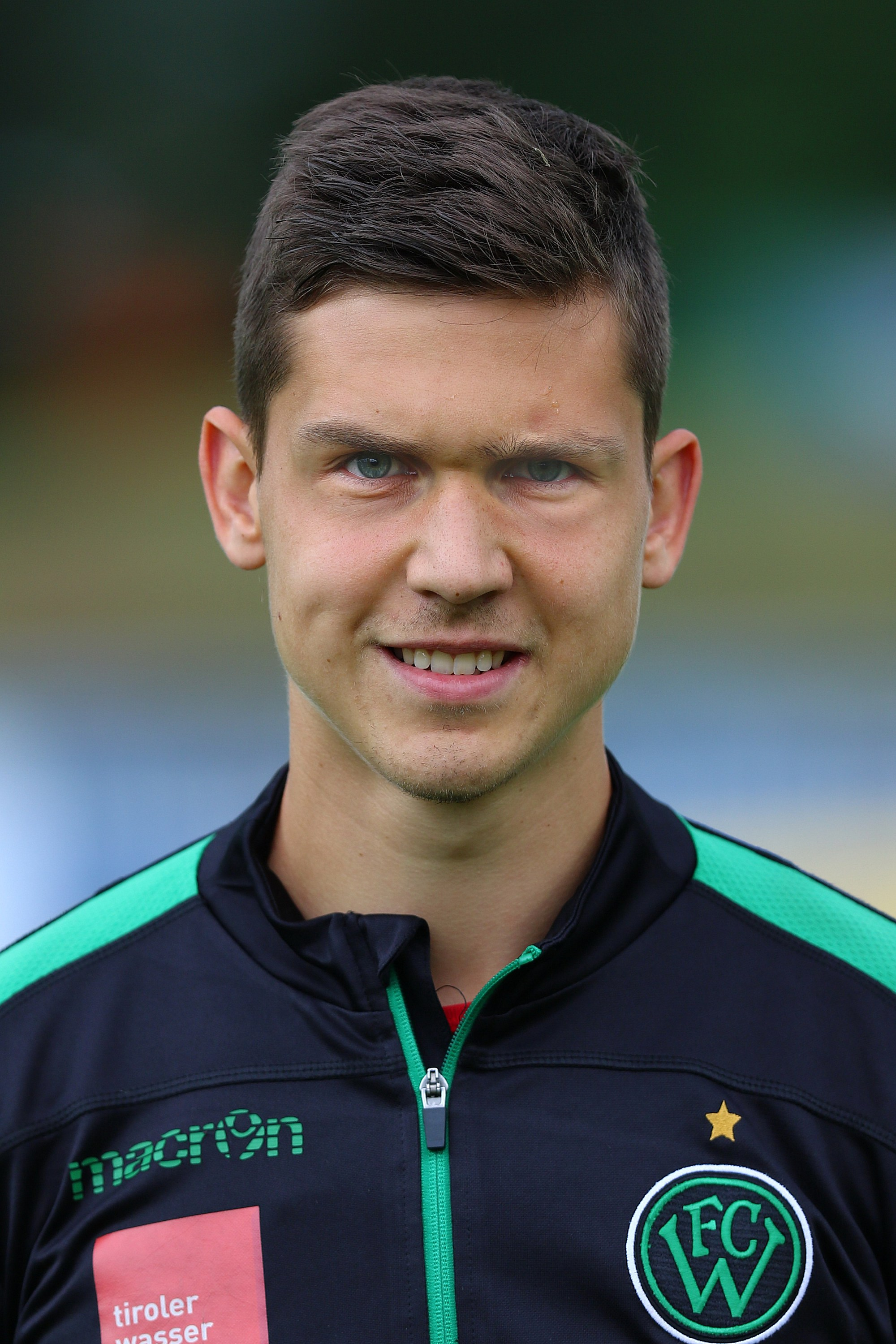

Personal information
- Date of birth: 19 October 1995 (age 31)
- Place of birth: Amstetten, Austria
- Height: 1.86 m (6 ft 1 in)
- Position: Goalkeeper

Team information
- Current team: Austria Wien
- Number: 13

Senior career*
Years	Team	Apps	(Gls)
2012–2013	SV Gaflenz	4	(0)
2013–2021	Wacker Innsbruck II	64	(0)
2014–2021	Wacker Innsbruck	40	(0)
2021–	Austria Wien	0	(0)
- * Club domestic league appearances and goals as of 29 August 2021

Lukas Wedl (born 19 October 1995) is an Austrian footballer currently playing for Austria Wien.

== Club career ==
On 31 August 2021, he moved to Austria Wien.
