= Del-Angelo Williams =

German footballer

Personal information
- Full name: Del-Angelo Williams
- Date of birth: 4 August 1993 (age 33)
- Place of birth: Marburg, Germany
- Height: 1.83 m (6 ft 0 in)
- Position: Forward

Team information
- Current team: VfB Marburg
- Number: 7

Youth career
- –2012: VfB Marburg

Senior career*
Years	Team	Apps	(Gls)
2012–2014	VfB Marburg	28	(9)
2014–2018	Eintracht Stadtallendorf	112	(50)
2014–2016	Eintracht Stadtallendorf II	4	(1)
2018–2019	Hansa Rostock	12	(1)
2018–2019	Hansa Rostock II	5	(4)
2019–2020	SV Elversberg	22	(5)
2020–2023	Eintracht Stadtallendorf	73	(36)
2023–	VfB Marburg	9	(4)
- * Club domestic league appearances and goals as of 18:22, 15 October 2023 (UTC)

Del-Angelo Williams (born 4 August 1993) is a German footballer who plays as a forward for VfB Marburg.
