= Mërgim Fejzullahu =

Albanian footballer

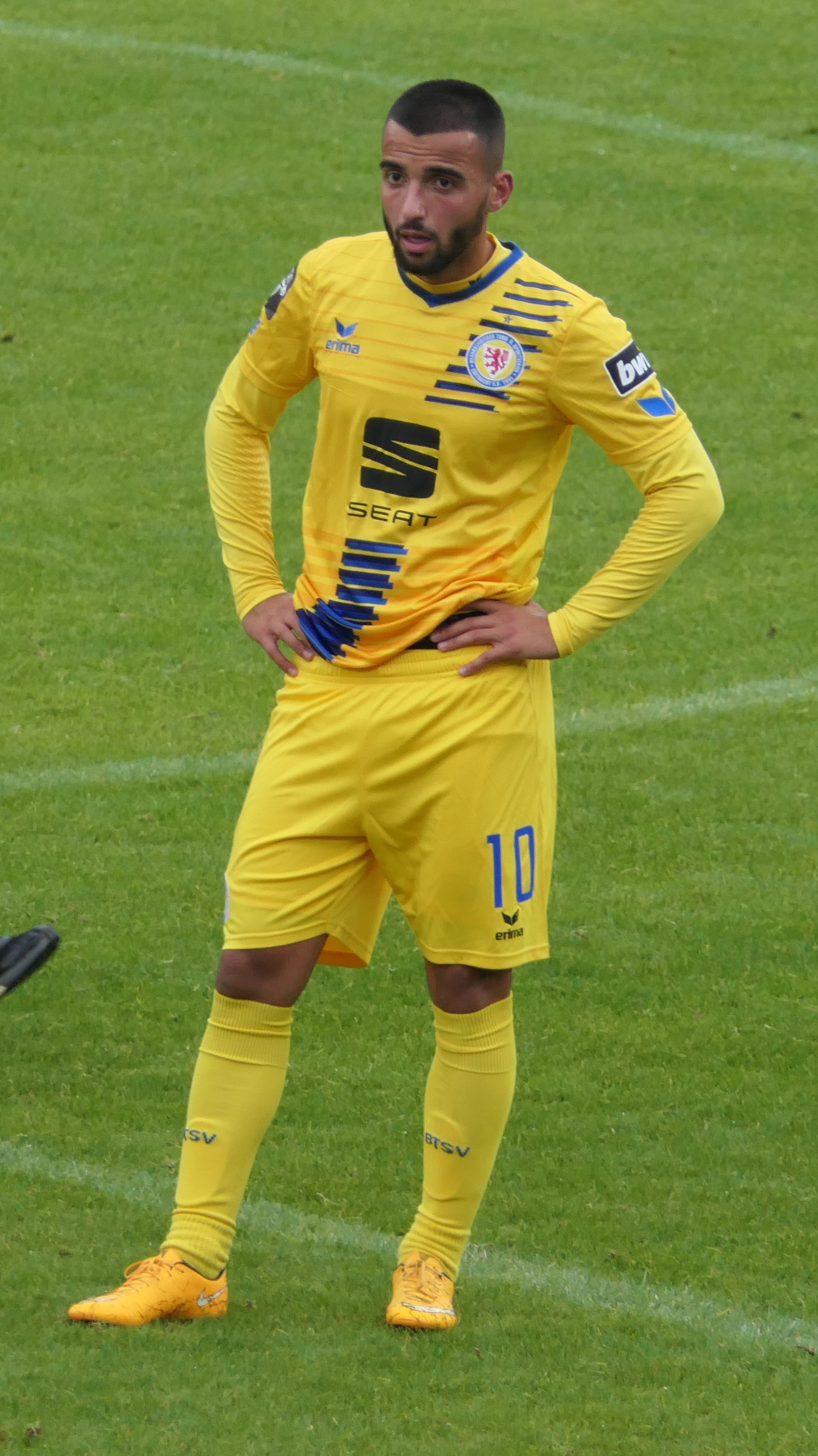
- Fejzullahu with Eintracht Braunschweig in 2018

Personal information
- Date of birth: 29 March 1994 (age 32)
- Place of birth: Fribourg, Switzerland
- Height: 1.73 m (5 ft 8 in)
- Position: Midfielder

Team information
- Current team: 1. FC Bocholt
- Number: 8

Youth career
- –2010: TSV Solingen-Aufderhöhe
- 2010–2013: Fortuna Düsseldorf

Senior career*
Years	Team	Apps	(Gls)
2013–2016	Fortuna Düsseldorf II	53	(4)
2016–2018	Alemannia Aachen	60	(24)
2018–2019	Eintracht Braunschweig	12	(2)
2019–2021	1. FC Saarbrücken	6	(1)
2021–2022	Alemannia Aachen	28	(2)
2022–	1. FC Bocholt	37	(2)
- * Club domestic league appearances and goals as of 1 July 2024

Mërgim Fejzullahu (born 29 March 1994) is an Albanian professional footballer who plays as a midfielder for German club 1. FC Bocholt.
