= 2019 UEFA European Under-17 Championship qualification =

Tournament details
- Dates: Qualifying round: 27 September – 2 November 2018; Elite round: 20 March – 1 April 2019
- Teams: 54 (from 1 confederation)

Tournament statistics
- Matches played: 126
- Goals scored: 441 (3.5 per match)
- Top scorer: (Russia) Kirill Shchetinin (8 goals)

The 2019 UEFA European Under-17 Championship qualifying competition was a men's under-17 football competition that determined the 15 teams joining the automatically qualified hosts Republic of Ireland in the 2019 UEFA European Under-17 Championship final tournament.

Apart from Republic of Ireland, all remaining 54 UEFA member national teams entered the qualifying competition. Players born on or after 1 January 2002 were eligible to participate. Starting from this season, up to five substitutions are permitted per team in each match. Moreover, each match has a regular duration of 90 minutes, instead of 80 minutes in previous seasons.

== Format ==
The qualifying competition consists of two rounds:

- Qualifying round: Apart from England and Germany, which receive byes to the elite round as the teams with the highest seeding coefficient, the remaining 52 teams are drawn into 13 groups of four teams. Each group is played in single round-robin format at one of the teams selected as hosts after the draw. The 13 group winners, the 13 runners-up, and the four third-placed teams with the best record against the first and second-placed teams in their group advance to the elite round.
- Elite round: The 32 teams are drawn into eight groups of four teams. Each group is played in single round-robin format at one of the teams selected as hosts after the draw. The eight group winners and the seven runners-up with the best record against the first and third-placed teams in their group qualify for the final tournament.

The schedule of each group is as follows, with two rest days between each matchday (Regulations Article 20.04):

Group schedule
Matchday	Matches
Matchday 1	1 v 4, 3 v 2
Matchday 2	1 v 3, 2 v 4
Matchday 3	2 v 1, 4 v 3

=== Tiebreakers ===
In the qualifying round and elite round, teams are ranked according to points (3 points for a win, 1 point for a draw, 0 points for a loss), and if tied on points, the following tiebreaking criteria are applied, in the order given, to determine the rankings (Regulations Articles 14.01 and 14.02):

1. Points in head-to-head matches among tied teams;
2. Goal difference in head-to-head matches among tied teams;
3. Goals scored in head-to-head matches among tied teams;
4. If more than two teams are tied, and after applying all head-to-head criteria above, a subset of teams are still tied, all head-to-head criteria above are reapplied exclusively to this subset of teams;
5. Goal difference in all group matches;
6. Goals scored in all group matches;
7. Penalty shoot-out if only two teams have the same number of points, and they met in the last round of the group and are tied after applying all criteria above (not used if more than two teams have the same number of points, or if their rankings are not relevant for qualification for the next stage);
8. Disciplinary points (red card = 3 points, yellow card = 1 point, expulsion for two yellow cards in one match = 3 points);
9. UEFA coefficient for the qualifying round draw;
10. Drawing of lots.

To determine the four best third-placed teams from the qualifying round and the seven best runners-up from the elite round, the results against the teams in fourth place are discarded. The following criteria are applied (Regulations Articles 15.01, 15.02 and 15.03):

1. Points;
2. Goal difference;
3. Goals scored;
4. Disciplinary points;
5. UEFA coefficient for the qualifying round draw;
6. Drawing of lots.

== Qualifying round ==
=== Draw ===
The draw for the qualifying round was held on 6 December 2017, 09:00 CET (UTC+1), at the UEFA headquarters in Nyon, Switzerland.

The teams were seeded according to their coefficient ranking, calculated based on the following (a four-year window was used instead of the previous three-year window):

- 2014 UEFA European Under-17 Championship final tournament and qualifying competition (qualifying round and elite round)
- 2015 UEFA European Under-17 Championship final tournament and qualifying competition (qualifying round and elite round)
- 2016 UEFA European Under-17 Championship final tournament and qualifying competition (qualifying round and elite round)
- 2017 UEFA European Under-17 Championship final tournament and qualifying competition (qualifying round and elite round)

Each group contained one team from Pot A, one team from Pot B, one team from Pot C, and one team from Pot D. For political reasons, Russia and Ukraine, Spain and Gibraltar, Serbia and Kosovo, and Bosnia and Herzegovina and Kosovo would not be drawn in the same group.

Final tournament hosts
Team	Coeff	Rank
**Republic of Ireland**	13.667	—

Bye to elite round
Team	Coeff	Rank
**England**	27.667	1
**Germany**	25.333	2

Teams entering qualifying round

Pot A
Team	Coeff	Rank
**Spain**	24.056	3
**Netherlands**	23.111	4
**Portugal**	21.389	5
**France**	20.611	6
Scotland	17.000	7
**Italy**	15.000	8
**Russia**	14.944	9
**Belgium**	14.833	10
**Austria**	14.167	11
Turkey	13.556	12
Serbia	13.333	13
Bosnia and Herzegovina	12.111	14
**Czech Republic**	11.778	15

Pot B
Team	Coeff	Rank
Poland	11.667	16
Croatia	11.056	17
**Sweden**	10.889	18
Ukraine	10.722	19
**Greece**	10.722	20
Switzerland	10.667	21
Israel	9.000	22
Slovenia	8.444	23
Slovakia	8.333	24
**Hungary**	8.278	25
Norway	7.500	26
Wales	7.333	27
Denmark	7.222	28

Pot C
Team	Coeff	Rank
**Iceland**	6.500	29
Georgia	6.333	30
Azerbaijan	6.333	31
Belarus	6.167	32
Romania	6.000	33
Cyprus	5.667	34
Finland	5.500	35
Bulgaria	5.333	36
Latvia	4.500	37
Faroe Islands	4.222	38
Northern Ireland	4.167	39
Montenegro	3.667	40
Armenia	3.000	41

Pot D
Team	Coeff	Rank
Albania	3.000	42
Macedonia	3.000	43
Estonia	3.000	44
Malta	3.000	45
Lithuania	2.333	46
Moldova	2.000	47
Luxembourg	1.667	48
Kazakhstan	1.000	49
Liechtenstein	1.000	50
San Marino	0.333	51
Gibraltar	0.333	52
Andorra	0.000	53
Kosovo	—	54

Notes

- Teams marked in **bold** have qualified for the final tournament.

=== Groups ===
The qualifying round must be played by 20 November 2018.

Times up to 27 October 2018 are CEST (UTC+2), thereafter times are CET (UTC+1), as listed by UEFA (local times, if different, are in parentheses).

==== Group 1 ====
Pos	Team	Pld	W	D	L	GF	GA	GD	Pts	Qualification
1	Netherlands	3	3	0	0	22	5	+17	**9**	Elite round
2	Sweden (H)	3	2	0	1	11	6	+5	**6**	Elite round
3	Montenegro	3	1	0	2	2	8	−6	**3**	
4	Liechtenstein	3	0	0	3	1	17	−16	**0**	

Source: UEFA
Rules for classification: Qualification tiebreakers
(H) Hosts
27 September 2018
18:00

Netherlands	10–1	Liechtenstein
Bannis 11', 51' (pen.); Proper 19'; Brobbey 20', 45'; Braaf 38'; Hoever 43', 53'; Pinas 56'; Taabouni 83'	Report	Allaart 86' (pen.)

Rimnersvallen, Uddevalla
Referee: Iwan Arwel Griffith (Wales)
27 September 2018
18:00

Montenegro	0–2	Sweden
	Report	Nanasi 2'; Collander 85'

Skarsjövallen, Ljungskile
Referee: Krzysztof Jakubik (Poland)

30 September 2018
15:00

Netherlands	6–0	Montenegro
Taabouni 14'; Braaf 17'; Bannis 24' (pen.), 72' (pen.); Hansen 31', 66'	Report

Skarsjövallen, Ljungskile
Referee: Denys Shurman (Ukraine)
30 September 2018
15:00

Sweden	5–0	Liechtenstein
Prica 67', 82'; Landsten 69', 79', 90+1'	Report

Rimnersvallen, Uddevalla
Referee: Iwan Arwel Griffith (Wales)

3 October 2018
18:00

Sweden	4–6	Netherlands
Prica 25'; Nanasi 66', 90+1' (pen.); Landsten 90+2'	Report	Bannis 30' (pen.), 56' (pen.), 61' (pen.); Hoever 59'; Allouch 69'; Pinas 90+4'

Skarsjövallen, Ljungskile
Referee: Krzysztof Jakubik (Poland)
3 October 2018
18:00

Liechtenstein	0–2	Montenegro
	Report	Dapčević 6'; Gasevic 55'

Rimnersvallen, Uddevalla
Referee: Denys Shurman (Ukraine)

==== Group 2 ====
Pos	Team	Pld	W	D	L	GF	GA	GD	Pts	Qualification
1	Ukraine	3	2	1	0	16	4	+12	**7**	Elite round
2	Iceland	3	1	2	0	11	3	+8	**5**	Elite round
3	Bosnia and Herzegovina (H)	3	1	1	1	11	4	+7	**4**	Elite round
4	Gibraltar	3	0	0	3	0	27	−27	**0**	

Source: UEFA
Rules for classification: Qualification tiebreakers
(H) Hosts
10 October 2018
15:00

Bosnia and Herzegovina	8–0	Gibraltar
Jović 9'; Yeo 13' (o.g.); Vintonji 45+2'; Jusupović 66', 83'; Beća 69'; Drljo 78'; Mujkanović 80'	Report

Bosnia and Herzegovina FA Training Centre, Zenica
Referee: Luis Teixeira (Portugal)
10 October 2018
15:00

Iceland	2–2	Ukraine
Jóhannesson 4'; Vivcharenko 7' (o.g.)	Report	Brazhko 65'; Kobak 81'

MGM Farm Arena, Kakanj
Referee: Aleksandrs Anufrijevs (Latvia)

13 October 2018
15:00

Bosnia and Herzegovina	1–1	Iceland
Duraković 44'	Report	Jóhannesson 68' (pen.)

Bosnia and Herzegovina FA Training Centre, Zenica
Referee: Robert Hennessy (Ireland)
13 October 2018
15:00

Ukraine	11–0	Gibraltar
Skorko 8'; Shuranov 20', 57'; Kobak 33'; Honcharuk 45'; Bliznichenko 58'; Sudakov 70', 83', 87'; Vanat 73' (pen.), 75'	Report

MGM Farm Arena, Kakanj
Referee: Luis Teixeira (Portugal)

16 October 2018
15:00

Ukraine	3–2	Bosnia and Herzegovina
Sudakov 13' (pen.); Shuranov 29', 68'	Report	Jusupović 45+1'; Duraković 74' (pen.)

MGM Farm Arena, Kakanj
Referee: Aleksandrs Anufrijevs (Latvia)
16 October 2018
15:00

Gibraltar	0–8	Iceland
	Report	Jóhannsson 16'; Ellertsson 29', 80'; Jóhannesson 43', 73'; Djuric 50', 67'; Baldursson 70'

Bosnia and Herzegovina FA Training Centre, Zenica
Referee: Robert Hennessy (Republic of Ireland)

==== Group 3 ====
Pos	Team	Pld	W	D	L	GF	GA	GD	Pts	Qualification
1	Austria	3	2	1	0	10	2	+8	**7**	Elite round
2	Slovenia (H)	3	2	1	0	4	2	+2	**7**	Elite round
3	Bulgaria	3	1	0	2	4	4	0	**3**	
4	Malta	3	0	0	3	2	12	−10	**0**	

Source: UEFA
Rules for classification: Qualification tiebreakers
(H) Hosts
24 October 2018
11:00

Austria	7–0	Malta
Braunöder 16'; Demir 18', 42'; Zimmermann 64', 69'; Köchl 88' (pen.); Pehlivan 90'	Report

NNC Brdo, Kranj
Referee: Donald Robertson (Scotland)
24 October 2018
15:00

Bulgaria	0–1	Slovenia
	Report	Panič 87'

NNC Brdo, Kranj
Referee: Jørgen Burchardt (Denmark)

27 October 2018
11:00

Austria	2–1	Bulgaria
Radulovic 13'; Koller 83'	Report	Panchev 49'

NNC Brdo, Kranj
Referee: Donald Robertson (Scotland)
27 October 2018
15:00

Slovenia	2–1	Malta
Šeško 18', 36'	Report	Veselji 27' (pen.)

NNC Brdo, Kranj
Referee: Dejan Jakimovski (Macedonia)

30 October 2018
11:00

Malta	1–3	Bulgaria
Mohnani 90'	Report	Petkov 41', 73', 90+3'

NNC Brdo, Kranj
Referee: Dejan Jakimovski (Macedonia)
30 October 2018
14:30

Slovenia	1–1	Austria
Pečar 19'	Report	Pehlivan 45'

NNC Brdo, Kranj
Referee: Jørgen Burchardt (Denmark)

==== Group 4 ====
Pos	Team	Pld	W	D	L	GF	GA	GD	Pts	Qualification
1	Spain	3	3	0	0	10	0	+10	**9**	Elite round
2	Israel	3	2	0	1	10	4	+6	**6**	Elite round
3	Macedonia (H)	3	1	0	2	5	5	0	**3**	
4	Faroe Islands	3	0	0	3	0	16	−16	**0**	

Source: UEFA
Rules for classification: Qualification tiebreakers
(H) Hosts
20 October 2018
11:00

Faroe Islands	0–6	Israel
	Report	Gabay 69', 72'; Podgoreanu 75', 83'; Leidner 87'; Azoulay 90+1'

Training Centre Petar Miloševski (small stadium), Skopje
Referee: Espen Eskås (Norway)
20 October 2018
15:15

Spain	1–0	Macedonia
Salazar 90+5'	Report

Training Centre Petar Miloševski, Skopje
Referee: Ioannis Papadopoulos (Greece)

23 October 2018
11:00

Spain	6–0	Faroe Islands
Escobar 5'; Uriarte 10', 52'; Salazar 28'; Rodríguez 47'; Gómez 64'	Report

Training Centre Petar Miloševski (small stadium), Skopje
Referee: Ian McNabb (Northern Ireland)
23 October 2018
15:15

Israel	4–1	Macedonia
Harush 52'; Gabay 55' (pen.); Torgeman 77', 79'	Report	Feta 33'

Training Centre Petar Miloševski, Skopje
Referee: Espen Eskås (Norway)

26 October 2018
14:30

Israel	0–3	Spain
	Report	Blesa 40'; Escobar 43'; Uriarte 90+3'

Philip II Arena, Skopje
Referee: Ioannis Papadopoulos (Greece)
26 October 2018
14:30

Macedonia	4–0	Faroe Islands
Omeragić 10', 36'; Nikolov 79'; Feta 90+2'	Report

Training Centre Petar Miloševski, Skopje
Referee: Ian McNabb (Northern Ireland)

==== Group 5 ====
Pos	Team	Pld	W	D	L	GF	GA	GD	Pts	Qualification
1	Kosovo	3	2	0	1	3	2	+1	**6**	Elite round
2	Scotland	3	1	2	0	4	3	+1	**5**	Elite round
3	Switzerland	3	1	1	1	4	2	+2	**4**	Elite round
4	Cyprus (H)	3	0	1	2	1	5	−4	**1**	

Source: UEFA
Rules for classification: Qualification tiebreakers
(H) Hosts
26 October 2018
14:00 (15:00 EEST)

Scotland	2–1	Kosovo
Fiorini 28'; Winter 77'	Report	Bilalli 71'

Stelios Kyriakides Stadium, Paphos
Referee: Alexandru Tean (Moldova)
26 October 2018
14:00 (15:00 EEST)

Cyprus	0–3	Switzerland
	Report	Cotter 48'; Brnic 55'; Rieder 59'

Peyia Municipal Stadium, Pegeia
Referee: João Pinheiro (Portugal)

29 October 2018
14:00 (15:00 EET)

Scotland	1–1	Cyprus
Fiorini 87'	Report	Georgallides 39'

Peyia Municipal Stadium, Pegeia
Referee: Ferenc Karakó (Hungary)
29 October 2018
14:00 (15:00 EET)

Switzerland	0–1	Kosovo
	Report	Zumberi 63'

Stelios Kyriakides Stadium, Paphos
Referee: Alexandru Tean (Moldova)

1 November 2018
14:00 (15:00 EET)

Switzerland	1–1	Scotland
Rieder 53'	Report	Winter 13'

Stelios Kyriakides Stadium, Paphos
Referee: João Pinheiro (Portugal)
1 November 2018
14:00 (15:00 EET)

Kosovo	1–0	Cyprus
Avdyli 63'	Report

Peyia Municipal Stadium, Pegeia
Referee: Ferenc Karakó (Hungary)

==== Group 6 ====
Pos	Team	Pld	W	D	L	GF	GA	GD	Pts	Qualification
1	Denmark (H)	3	3	0	0	9	3	+6	**9**	Elite round
2	Russia	3	2	0	1	13	2	+11	**6**	Elite round
3	Estonia	3	1	0	2	3	11	−8	**3**	
4	Georgia	3	0	0	3	2	11	−9	**0**	

Source: UEFA
Rules for classification: Qualification tiebreakers
(H) Hosts
24 October 2018
13:00

Georgia	1–3	Denmark
Morchiladze 3'	Report	Højberre-Thomsen 38', 58'; Lind 90+3'

Hobro Stadium, Hobro
Referee: Milovan Milačić (Montenegro)
24 October 2018
18:00

Russia	6–0	Estonia
Kotin 46'; Shchetinin 58', 76' (pen.), 87', 90+1'; Shapovalov 62'	Report

Skive Stadion, Skive
Referee: Christopher Jaeger (Austria)

27 October 2018
13:00

Russia	7–1	Georgia
Shamkin 1', 22'; Shchetinin 40', 56' (pen.), 75' (pen.); Kratkov 65', 76'	Report	Abuashvili 73'

Viborg Stadium, Viborg
Referee: Nejc Kajtazović (Slovenia)
27 October 2018
18:00

Denmark	5–2	Estonia
Crone 11' (pen.), 44', 86'; Haahr 17'; Simsir 60'	Report	Šapovalov 45+1'; Obbekjær 89' (o.g.)

Viborg Stadium, Viborg
Referee: Milovan Milačić (Montenegro)

30 October 2018
13:00

Denmark	1–0	Russia
Sørensen 74'	Report

Skive Stadion, Skive
Referee: Christopher Jaeger (Austria)
30 October 2018
13:00

Estonia	1–0	Georgia
Kruglov 27'	Report

Vildbjerg Stadion, Vildbjerg
Referee: Nejc Kajtazović (Slovenia)

==== Group 7 ====
Pos	Team	Pld	W	D	L	GF	GA	GD	Pts	Qualification
1	France	3	3	0	0	9	2	+7	**9**	Elite round
2	Poland (H)	3	2	0	1	10	7	+3	**6**	Elite round
3	Finland	3	1	0	2	4	4	0	**3**	
4	Luxembourg	3	0	0	3	3	13	−10	**0**	

Source: UEFA
Rules for classification: Qualification tiebreakers
(H) Hosts
25 October 2018
13:00

Finland	1–2	Poland
Rissanen 9'	Report	Zalewski 70'; Marchwiński 90+3'

MOSiR Stadium, Ząbki
Referee: Dumitri Muntean (Moldova)
25 October 2018
18:00

France	4–0	Luxembourg
Zidane 3'; Hassan 56'; Kouassi 69'; Aouchiche 90+2'	Report

MOSiR Stadium, Ząbki
Referee: Urs Schnyder (Switzerland)

28 October 2018
13:00

France	2–1	Finland
Kembo 28'; Miettinen 47' (o.g.)	Report	Anini Jr. 32'

Stadion RKS Ursus, Warsaw
Referee: Yaroslav Kozyk (Ukraine)
28 October 2018
13:00

Poland	7–3	Luxembourg
Turski 1', 3'; Niewiadomski 8'; Kozłowski 23'; Marchwiński 52'; Wędrychowski 85', 90'	Report	Curci 17', 75'; Hoffmann 26' (pen.)

MOSiR Stadium, Ząbki
Referee: Urs Schnyder (Switzerland)

31 October 2018
13:00

Poland	1–3	France
Pembele 46' (o.g.)	Report	Aouchiche 9'; Niewiadomski 83' (o.g.); Zidane 90'

MOSiR Stadium, Ząbki
Referee: Dumitri Muntean (Moldova)
31 October 2018
13:00

Luxembourg	0–2	Finland
	Report	Ala 31'; Marhiev 87'

Stadion RKS Ursus, Warsaw
Referee: Yaroslav Kozyk (Ukraine)

==== Group 8 ====
Pos	Team	Pld	W	D	L	GF	GA	GD	Pts	Qualification
1	Czech Republic	3	3	0	0	9	0	+9	**9**	Elite round
2	Norway	3	2	0	1	7	3	+4	**6**	Elite round
3	Albania (H)	3	1	0	2	2	9	−7	**3**	
4	Azerbaijan	3	0	0	3	1	7	−6	**0**	

Source: UEFA
Rules for classification: Qualification tiebreakers
(H) Hosts
23 October 2018
12:00

Azerbaijan	1–4	Norway
Gurbanli 89'	Report	Geelmuyden 18' (pen.); Skrogstad 19'; Oppegård 20'; Vallotto 71'

Abdurrahman Roza Haxhiu Stadium, Lushnjë
Referee: Admir Šehović (Bosnia and Herzegovina)
23 October 2018
14:00

Czech Republic	6–0	Albania
Wojatschke 13', 19', 49'; Svoboda 23'; Hložek 42'; Sejk 87'	Report

Elbasan Arena, Elbasan
Referee: Igor Pajac (Croatia)

26 October 2018
12:00

Czech Republic	2–0	Azerbaijan
Wojatschke 9'; Hložek 89'	Report

Abdurrahman Roza Haxhiu Stadium, Lushnjë
Referee: Boris Marhefka (Slovakia)
26 October 2018
14:00

Norway	3–1	Albania
Geelmuyden 45+2' (pen.); Oppegård 61', 90+4'	Report	Gjini 80'

Elbasan Arena, Elbasan
Referee: Admir Šehović (Bosnia and Herzegovina)

29 October 2018
14:00

Norway	0–1	Czech Republic
	Report	Svoboda 69'

Abdurrahman Roza Haxhiu Stadium, Lushnjë
Referee: Igor Pajac (Croatia)
29 October 2018
14:00

Albania	1–0	Azerbaijan
Mitaj 44' (pen.)	Report

Elbasan Arena, Elbasan
Referee: Boris Marhefka (Slovakia)

==== Group 9 ====
Pos	Team	Pld	W	D	L	GF	GA	GD	Pts	Qualification
1	Hungary (H)	3	2	1	0	4	0	+4	**7**	Elite round
2	Romania	3	1	2	0	6	2	+4	**5**	Elite round
3	Serbia	3	1	1	1	4	4	0	**4**	Elite round
4	Lithuania	3	0	0	3	1	9	−8	**0**	

Source: UEFA
Rules for classification: Qualification tiebreakers
(H) Hosts
30 September 2018
16:00

Serbia	2–1	Lithuania
Colic 53'; Baic 61'	Report	Abramavičius 82'

BMTE Stadion, Budapest
Referee: Daniyar Sakhi (Kazakhstan)
30 September 2018
16:00

Romania	0–0	Hungary
	Report

Globall Football Park, Telki
Referee: Kristoffer Karlsson (Sweden)

3 October 2018
16:00

Serbia	2–2	Romania
Miladinović 55', 56'	Report	Stoica 63'; Munteanu 81'

Városi Stadion, Csákvár
Referee: Rohit Saggi (Norway)
3 October 2018
16:00

Hungary	3–0	Lithuania
Komáromi 24'; Zuigeber 45+2' (pen.), 68'	Report

Globall Football Park, Telki
Referee: Daniyar Sakhi (Kazakhstan)

6 October 2018
12:30

Hungary	1–0	Serbia
Baráth 29'	Report

Globall Football Park, Telki
Referee: Kristoffer Karlsson (Sweden)
6 October 2018
12:30

Lithuania	0–4	Romania
	Report	Stoica 5'; Munteanu 67'; Pitu 76' (pen.); Dragusin 84'

Városi Stadion, Csákvár
Referee: Rohit Saggi (Norway)

==== Group 10 ====
Pos	Team	Pld	W	D	L	GF	GA	GD	Pts	Qualification
1	Slovakia	3	3	0	0	12	0	+12	**9**	Elite round
2	Northern Ireland	3	1	1	1	7	2	+5	**4**	Elite round
3	Turkey (H)	3	1	1	1	7	4	+3	**4**	Elite round
4	San Marino	3	0	0	3	0	20	−20	**0**	

Source: UEFA
Rules for classification: Qualification tiebreakers
(H) Hosts
25 October 2018
12:00 (13:00 TRT)

Northern Ireland	0–1	Slovakia
	Report	Čerepkai 8'

Arslan Zeki Demirci Sports Complex 2, Manavgat
Referee: Lawrence Visser (Belgium)
25 October 2018
14:00 (15:00 TRT)

Turkey	6–0	San Marino
Çoğalan 19'; Akpınar 27'; Bayrak 47'; Üreyen 65'; Akman 67'; Sevinç 90+4'	Report

Arslan Zeki Demirci Sports Complex 1, Manavgat
Referee: Aleksei Matyunin (Russia)

The Northern Ireland v Slovakia match, kick-off on 24 October, 13:00 TRT, was abandoned after 13 minutes due to adverse weather conditions, with the remainder of the game played on 25 October, 13:00 TRT. The Turkey v San Marino match, scheduled for kick-off on 24 October, 16:30 TRT, was also postponed due to adverse weather conditions, and rescheduled to 25 October, 15:00 TRT.

27 October 2018
12:00 (13:00 TRT)

Slovakia	8–0	San Marino
Šviderský 9'; Čerepkai 19'; Szetei 25'; Suslov 27'; Nebyla 52'; Matoš 66', 72'; Leitner 82'	Report

Arslan Zeki Demirci Sports Complex 2, Manavgat
Referee: Genc Nuza (Kosovo)
27 October 2018
15:30 (16:30 TRT)

Turkey	1–1	Northern Ireland
Akpınar 11'	Report	Wylie 33'

Arslan Zeki Demirci Sports Complex 1, Manavgat
Referee: Aleksei Matyunin (Russia)

30 October 2018
13:30 (15:30 TRT)

Slovakia	3–0	Turkey
Suslov 28', 51'; Čerepkai 35'	Report

Arslan Zeki Demirci Sports Complex 1, Manavgat
Referee: Lawrence Visser (Belgium)
30 October 2018
13:30 (15:30 TRT)

San Marino	0–6	Northern Ireland
	Report	Burns 6' (pen.), 8' (pen.); Wylie 12', 28', 51'; Taylor 39'

Arslan Zeki Demirci Sports Complex 2, Manavgat
Referee: Genc Nuza (Kosovo)

==== Group 11 ====
Pos	Team	Pld	W	D	L	GF	GA	GD	Pts	Qualification
1	Portugal (H)	3	3	0	0	18	1	+17	**9**	Elite round
2	Belarus	3	1	1	1	4	6	−2	**4**	Elite round
3	Kazakhstan	3	1	0	2	2	12	−10	**3**	
4	Wales	3	0	1	2	3	8	−5	**1**	

Source: UEFA
Rules for classification: Qualification tiebreakers
(H) Hosts
10 October 2018
15:00 (14:00 WEST)

Belarus	2–2	Wales
Shalashnikov 65' (pen.); Robson 87' (o.g.)	Report	Thomas 11'; Gibbings 79'

Centro de Treino, Luso
Referee: Fyodor Zammit (Malta)
10 October 2018
18:00 (17:00 WEST)

Portugal	10–0	Kazakhstan
Quizera 19'; Bernardo 21'; Cruz 26'; Rodrigues 39', 45+1'; Camará 49', 67'; Gerson 57'; Tomás 75'; Batalha 80'	Report

Estádio Municipal de Aveiro, Aveiro
Referee: Kári Jóannesarson Á Høvdanum (Faroe Islands)

13 October 2018
15:00 (14:00 WEST)

Wales	0–1	Kazakhstan
	Report	Dobay 86'

Complexo Desportivo da Tocha, Tocha
Referee: Fyodor Zammit (Malta)
13 October 2018
18:00 (17:00 WEST)

Portugal	3–0	Belarus
Kalinin 4' (o.g.); Quizera 32'; Tavares 82'	Report

Estádio Municipal de Aveiro, Aveiro
Referee: Jari Järvinen (Finland)

16 October 2018
17:45 (16:45 WEST)

Wales	1–5	Portugal
Sparkes 24'	Report	Quizera 9'; Bernardo 59'; Gerson 75', 77'; Brazão 88'

Estádio Municipal de Aveiro, Aveiro
Referee: Jari Järvinen (Finland)
16 October 2018
17:45 (16:45 WEST)

Kazakhstan	1–2	Belarus
Abdurakhmanov 39'	Report	Zabelin 63'; Natynchik 77'

Estádio Municipal Sérgio Conceição, Coimbra
Referee: Kári Jóannesarson Á Høvdanum (Faroe Islands)

==== Group 12 ====
Pos	Team	Pld	W	D	L	GF	GA	GD	Pts	Qualification
1	Belgium	3	3	0	0	9	0	+9	**9**	Elite round
2	Greece	3	1	1	1	2	4	−2	**4**	Elite round
3	Latvia	3	0	2	1	3	8	−5	**2**	
4	Moldova (H)	3	0	1	2	2	4	−2	**1**	

Source: UEFA
Rules for classification: Qualification tiebreakers
(H) Hosts
25 October 2018
14:00 (15:00 EEST)

Belgium	1–0	Moldova
Engolo 39'	Report

Stadionul CPSM, Vadul lui Vodă
Attendance: 160
Referee: Volen Chinkov (Bulgaria)
25 October 2018
14:00 (15:00 EEST)

Latvia	1–1	Greece
Lagūns 32'	Report	Tzolis 78'

CSR Orhei, Orhei
Attendance: 72
Referee: Tim Marshall (Northern Ireland)

28 October 2018
14:00 (15:00 EET)

Belgium	5–0	Latvia
Engolo 9'; Doku 35' (pen.), 39'; Idumbo-Mazumbo 84'; Al Dakhil 85'	Report

CSR Orhei, Orhei
Attendance: 115
Referee: Kristoffer Hagenes (Norway)
28 October 2018
14:00 (15:00 EET)

Greece	1–0	Moldova
Tzolis 25' (pen.)	Report

Stadionul CPSM, Vadul lui Vodă
Attendance: 170
Referee: Volen Chinkov (Bulgaria)

31 October 2018
12:00 (13:00 EET)

Greece	0–3	Belgium
	Report	El Hadj 45'; Idumbo-Mazumbo 50', 79'

CSR Orhei, Orhei
Attendance: 87
Referee: Kristoffer Hagenes (Norway)
31 October 2018
12:00 (13:00 EET)

Moldova	2–2	Latvia
Gherman 8'; Danu 45+2'	Report	Lagūns 59'; Meļņiks 75'

Stadionul CPSM, Vadul lui Vodă
Attendance: 103
Referee: Tim Marshall (Northern Ireland)

==== Group 13 ====
Pos	Team	Pld	W	D	L	GF	GA	GD	Pts	Qualification
1	Italy	3	3	0	0	13	0	+13	**9**	Elite round
2	Croatia (H)	3	2	0	1	6	3	+3	**6**	Elite round
3	Andorra	3	1	0	2	3	10	−7	**3**	
4	Armenia	3	0	0	3	0	9	−9	**0**	

Source: UEFA
Rules for classification: Qualification tiebreakers
(H) Hosts
27 October 2018
12:30

Italy	7–0	Andorra
Cudrig 19', 64'; Oristanio 23'; Tongya 28'; Spina 39'; Esposito 85'; Cester 90+2'	Report

Stadion Hrvatski vitezovi, Dugopolje
Referee: Juxhin Xhaja (Albania)
27 October 2018
15:00

Armenia	0–3	Croatia
	Report	Vasilj 12'; Biuk 36'; Groznica 90+3'

Gradski stadion, Sinj
Referee: Bryn Markham-Jones (Wales)

30 October 2018
11:00

Italy	3–0	Armenia
Tongya 19'; Esposito 26' (pen.); Cudrig 87'	Report

Gradski stadion, Sinj
Referee: Luis Godinho (Portugal)
30 October 2018
17:00

Croatia	3–0	Andorra
Vasilj 45+2', 90+1'; Sučić 77'	Report

Stadion Hrvatski vitezovi, Dugopolje
Referee: Bryn Markham-Jones (Wales)

2 November 2018
14:00

Croatia	0–3	Italy
	Report	Cudrig 34'; Esposito 37'; Lamanna 71'

Gradski stadion, Sinj
Referee: Luis Godinho (Portugal)
2 November 2018
14:00

Andorra	3–0	Armenia
Bellido 5' (pen.); Romero 16'; Rosas 21'	Report

Stadion Hrvatski vitezovi, Dugopolje
Referee: Juxhin Xhaja (Albania)

=== Ranking of third-placed teams ===
To determine the four best third-placed teams from the qualifying round which advance to the elite round, only the results of the third-placed teams against the first and second-placed teams in their group are taken into account.

Pos	Grp	Team	Pld	W	D	L	GF	GA	GD	Pts	Qualification
1	2	Bosnia and Herzegovina	2	0	1	1	3	4	−1	1	Elite round
2	9	Serbia	2	0	1	1	2	3	−1	1	Elite round
3	5	Switzerland	2	0	1	1	1	2	−1	1	Elite round
4	10	Turkey	2	0	1	1	1	4	−3	1	Elite round
5	12	Latvia	2	0	1	1	1	6	−5	1	
6	7	Finland	2	0	0	2	2	4	−2	0	
7	3	Bulgaria	2	0	0	2	1	3	−2	0	
8	4	Macedonia	2	0	0	2	1	5	−4	0	
9	8	Albania	2	0	0	2	1	9	−8	0	
10	1	Montenegro	2	0	0	2	0	8	−8	0	
11	6	Estonia	2	0	0	2	2	11	−9	0	
12	13	Andorra	2	0	0	2	0	10	−10	0	
13	11	Kazakhstan	2	0	0	2	1	12	−11	0	

Source: UEFA
Rules for classification: 1) points; 2) goal difference; 3) goals scored; 4) disciplinary points; 5) coefficient; 6) drawing of lots.

== Elite round ==
=== Draw ===
The draw for the elite round was held on 6 December 2018, 11:45 CET (UTC+1), at the UEFA headquarters in Nyon, Switzerland.

The teams were seeded according to their results in the qualifying round. England and Germany, which received byes to the elite round, were automatically seeded into Pot A. Each group contained one team from Pot A, one team from Pot B, one team from Pot C, and one team from Pot D. Winners and runners-up from the same qualifying round group could not be drawn in the same group, but the best third-placed teams could be drawn in the same group as winners or runners-up from the same qualifying round group. For political reasons, Kosovo would not be drawn in the same group as either Serbia or Bosnia and Herzegovina.

Pos	Grp	Team	Pld	W	D	L	GF	GA	GD	Pts	Seeding
1	—	England	0	0	0	0	0	0	0	0	Pot A
2	—	Germany	0	0	0	0	0	0	0	0	Pot A
3	1	Netherlands	3	3	0	0	22	5	+17	9	Pot A
4	11	Portugal	3	3	0	0	18	1	+17	9	Pot A
5	13	Italy	3	3	0	0	13	0	+13	9	Pot A
6	10	Slovakia	3	3	0	0	12	0	+12	9	Pot A
7	4	Spain	3	3	0	0	10	0	+10	9	Pot A
8	12	Belgium	3	3	0	0	9	0	+9	9 (Note: Disciplinary points: Belgium 0, Czech Republic 2.)	Pot A
9	8	Czech Republic	3	3	0	0	9	0	+9	9	Pot B
10	7	France	3	3	0	0	9	2	+7	9	Pot B
11	6	Denmark	3	3	0	0	9	3	+6	9	Pot B
12	2	Ukraine	3	2	1	0	16	4	+12	7	Pot B
13	3	Austria	3	2	1	0	10	2	+8	7	Pot B
14	9	Hungary	3	2	1	0	4	0	+4	7	Pot B
15	3	Slovenia	3	2	1	0	4	2	+2	7	Pot B
16	6	Russia	3	2	0	1	13	2	+11	6	Pot B
17	4	Israel	3	2	0	1	10	4	+6	6	Pot C
18	1	Sweden	3	2	0	1	11	6	+5	6	Pot C
19	8	Norway	3	2	0	1	7	3	+4	6	Pot C
20	7	Poland	3	2	0	1	10	7	+3	6	Pot C
21	13	Croatia	3	2	0	1	6	3	+3	6	Pot C
22	5	Kosovo	3	2	0	1	3	2	+1	6	Pot C
23	2	Iceland	3	1	2	0	11	3	+8	5	Pot C
24	9	Romania	3	1	2	0	6	2	+4	5	Pot C
25	5	Scotland	3	1	2	0	4	3	+1	5	Pot D
26	2	Bosnia and Herzegovina (Y)	3	1	1	1	11	4	+7	4	Pot D
27	10	Northern Ireland	3	1	1	1	7	2	+5	4	Pot D
28	10	Turkey (Y)	3	1	1	1	7	4	+3	4	Pot D
29	5	Switzerland (Y)	3	1	1	1	4	2	+2	4	Pot D
30	9	Serbia (Y)	3	1	1	1	4	4	0	4	Pot D
31	11	Belarus	3	1	1	1	4	6	−2	4	Pot D
32	12	Greece	3	1	1	1	2	4	−2	4	Pot D

Source: UEFA
Rules for classification: 1) points; 2) goal difference; 3) goals scored; 4) disciplinary points; 5) coefficient; 6) drawing of lots.
(Y) Third-placed teams from qualifying round (may be drawn with teams from same qualifying round group)

=== Groups ===
The elite round is scheduled to be played by the end of March 2019.

Times up to 30 March 2019 are CET (UTC+1), thereafter times are CEST (UTC+2), as listed by UEFA (local times, if different, are in parentheses).

==== Group 1 ====
Pos	Team	Pld	W	D	L	GF	GA	GD	Pts	Qualification
1	Italy	3	3	0	0	9	1	+8	9	Final tournament
2	Austria	3	1	1	1	6	5	+1	4	Final tournament
3	Romania	3	1	0	2	4	9	−5	3	
4	Turkey (H)	3	0	1	2	1	5	−4	1	

Source: UEFA
Rules for classification: Qualification tiebreakers
(H) Hosts
20 March 2019
10:00 (12:00 TRT)

Romania	1–5	Austria
Koller 90+2' (o.g.)	Report	Nelson 16'; Pehlivan 22', 39'; Böckle 73', 90+1'

Arslan Zeki Demirci Sports Complex 2, Manavgat
Referee: Dejan Jakimovski (Macedonia)
20 March 2019
13:00 (15:00 TRT)

Italy	2–0	Turkey
Esposito 54'; Moretti 79'	Report

Arslan Zeki Demirci Sports Complex 1, Manavgat
Referee: Antonio Emanuel Carvalho Nobre (Portugal)

23 March 2019
10:00 (12:00 TRT)

Italy	3–0	Romania
Cudrig 37'; Esposito 41'; Tongya 67'	Report

Arslan Zeki Demirci Sports Complex 2, Manavgat
Referee: Kaspar Sjöberg (Sweden)
23 March 2019
13:00 (15:00 TRT)

Austria	0–0	Turkey
	Report

Arslan Zeki Demirci Sports Complex 1, Manavgat
Referee: Dejan Jakimovski (Macedonia)

26 March 2019
12:00 (14:00 TRT)

Austria	1–4	Italy
Polster 75'	Report	Lamanna 40'; Bonfanti 55', 77'; Brentan 61'

Arslan Zeki Demirci Sports Complex 2, Manavgat
Referee: Antonio Emanuel Carvalho Nobre (Portugal)
26 March 2019
12:00 (14:00 TRT)

Turkey	1–3	Romania
Abay 52'	Report	Stoica 45+1'; Munteanu 78', 88' (pen.)

Arslan Zeki Demirci Sports Complex 1, Manavgat
Referee: Kaspar Sjöberg (Sweden)

==== Group 2 ====
Pos	Team	Pld	W	D	L	GF	GA	GD	Pts	Qualification
1	Netherlands (H)	3	3	0	0	12	2	+10	9	Final tournament
2	Czech Republic	3	2	0	1	5	5	0	6	Final tournament
3	Israel	3	0	1	2	0	3	−3	1	
4	Northern Ireland	3	0	1	2	0	7	−7	1	

Source: UEFA
Rules for classification: Qualification tiebreakers
(H) Hosts
20 March 2019
16:00

Israel	0–1	Czech Republic
	Report	Hložek 33'

Sportpark Zegersloot, Alphen aan den Rijn
Referee: Marcel Birsan (Romania)
20 March 2019
19:00

Netherlands	5–0	Northern Ireland
Brobbey 36', 69'; Maatsen 40'; Ünüvar 57'; Proper 90'	Report

Sportpark Juliana, 's-Gravenzande
Referee: Balázs Berke (Hungary)

23 March 2019
13:00

Czech Republic	2–0	Northern Ireland
Hroník 48'; Pech 71'	Report

Sportpark Juliana, 's-Gravenzande
Referee: Balázs Berke (Hungary)
23 March 2019
16:00

Netherlands	2–0	Israel
Taabouni 27'; Brobbey 30'	Report

Sportpark Zegersloot, Alphen aan den Rijn
Referee: Rauf Jabarov (Azerbaijan)

26 March 2019
19:00

Czech Republic	2–5	Netherlands
Ševčík 6'; Šilhart 78' (pen.)	Report	Brobbey 23', 62'; Sankoh 53'; Taabouni 57'; Hansen 72'

Sportpark Juliana, 's-Gravenzande
Referee: Marcel Birsan (Romania)
26 March 2019
19:00

Northern Ireland	0–0	Israel
	Report

Sportpark Zegersloot, Alphen aan den Rijn
Referee: Rauf Jabarov (Azerbaijan)

==== Group 3 ====
Pos	Team	Pld	W	D	L	GF	GA	GD	Pts	Qualification
1	England	3	2	1	0	8	4	+4	7	Final tournament
2	Croatia	3	1	2	0	4	3	+1	5	
3	Switzerland	3	0	2	1	4	7	−3	2	
4	Denmark (H)	3	0	1	2	5	7	−2	1	

Source: UEFA
Rules for classification: Qualification tiebreakers
(H) Hosts
21 March 2019
15:00

Croatia	3–2	Denmark
Jurčec 2'; Groznica 10'; Gvardiol 48'	Report	Džankić 16' (o.g.); Carstensen 68'

JYSK Park, Silkeborg
Referee: Nathan Verboomen (Belgium)
21 March 2019
19:00

England	5–2	Switzerland
Rogers 22', 80'; Greenwood 30', 32' (pen.); Fazlic 56' (o.g.)	Report	De Donno 52'; Stergiou 68'

JYSK Park, Silkeborg
Referee: Ondřej Pechanec (Czech Republic)

24 March 2019
13:00

England	0–0	Croatia
	Report

JYSK Park, Silkeborg
Referee: Ondřej Pechanec (Czech Republic)
24 March 2019
17:00

Denmark	1–1	Switzerland
De Donno 45+1' (o.g.)	Report	Reichmuth 62'

JYSK Park, Silkeborg
Referee: Laurent Kopriwa (Luxembourg)

27 March 2019
14:00

Denmark	2–3	England
Zaar 62'; Faghir 90+1'	Report	Madueke 79', 90+2'; Gelhardt 87'

JYSK Park, Silkeborg
Referee: Nathan Verboomen (Belgium)
27 March 2019
14:00

Switzerland	1–1	Croatia
Kasongo 65' (pen.)	Report	Branšteter 66'

Vorup Stadion, Randers
Referee: Laurent Kopriwa (Luxembourg)

==== Group 4 ====
Pos	Team	Pld	W	D	L	GF	GA	GD	Pts	Qualification
1	Iceland	3	2	1	0	9	5	+4	7	Final tournament
2	Germany (H)	3	1	2	0	5	4	+1	5	Final tournament
3	Belarus	3	0	2	1	3	6	−3	2	
4	Slovenia	3	0	1	2	2	4	−2	1	

Source: UEFA
Rules for classification: Qualification tiebreakers
(H) Hosts
20 March 2019
12:00

Germany	1–1	Belarus
Adeyemi 8'	Report	Lisakovich 57'

Stadion Im Haag, Idar-Oberstein
Referee: Zaven Hovhannisyan (Armenia)
20 March 2019
16:45

Iceland	2–1	Slovenia
Jóhannsson 8'; Gíslason 35'	Report	Panič 82'

Stadion Im Haag, Idar-Oberstein
Referee: Nikolas Neokleous (Cyprus)

23 March 2019
12:00

Germany	3–3	Iceland
Adeyemi 6'; Tillman 45'; Lang 58'	Report	Guðjohnsen 18', 50' (pen.), 61' (pen.)

Wormatia-Stadion, Worms
Referee: Donald Robertson (Scotland)
23 March 2019
17:30

Slovenia	1–1	Belarus
Panič 31'	Report	Shestyuk 78'

Wormatia-Stadion, Worms
Referee: Zaven Hovhannisyan (Armenia)

26 March 2019
12:00

Slovenia	0–1	Germany
	Report	Netz 77'

Sportpark Husterhöhe, Pirmasens
Referee: Donald Robertson (Scotland)
26 March 2019
12:00

Belarus	1–4	Iceland
Shestyuk 88'	Report	Jóhannesson 13', 49'; Guðjohnsen 73'; Baldursson 86' (pen.)

Stadion Im Haag, Idar-Oberstein
Referee: Nikolas Neokleous (Cyprus)

==== Group 5 ====
Note: Spain were originally to host the group between 20 and 26 March 2019, but were removed by UEFA as Spain do not recognize Kosovo's independence and would not allow the display of Kosovan symbols. As Ukraine and Greece, the other two teams in the group, also do not recognize Kosovo's independence, UEFA decided the group would be played in the neutral host country Switzerland between 25 and 31 March 2019.

Pos	Team	Pld	W	D	L	GF	GA	GD	Pts	Qualification
1	Spain	3	3	0	0	4	0	+4	9	Final tournament
2	Greece	3	2	0	1	3	2	+1	6	Final tournament
3	Ukraine	3	1	0	2	2	2	0	3	
4	Kosovo	3	0	0	3	0	5	−5	0	

Source: UEFA
Rules for classification: Qualification tiebreakers
25 March 2019
11:00

Kosovo	0–2	Ukraine
	Report	Batahov 19'; Viunnyk 27'

Colovray Sports Centre, Nyon
Referee: Gal Leibovitz (Israel)
25 March 2019
14:00

Spain	2–0	Greece
Valera 66'; Gómez 72'	Report

Colovray Sports Centre pitch 6, Nyon
Referee: Keith Kennedy (Northern Ireland)

28 March 2019
11:00

Ukraine	0–1	Greece
	Report	Tzolis 57'

Colovray Sports Centre pitch 6, Nyon
Referee: Keith Kennedy (Northern Ireland)
28 March 2019
14:00

Spain	1–0	Kosovo
Moreno 54'	Report

Colovray Sports Centre, Nyon
Referee: Sebastian Gishamer (Austria)

31 March 2019
14:00

Ukraine	0–1	Spain
	Report	Turrientes 90'

Colovray Sports Centre pitch 6, Nyon
Referee: Sebastien Gishamer (Austria)
31 March 2019
14:00

Greece	2–0	Kosovo
Tzolis 19' (pen.), 42'	Report

Colovray Sports Centre, Nyon
Referee: Gal Leibovitz (Israel)

==== Group 6 ====
Pos	Team	Pld	W	D	L	GF	GA	GD	Pts	Qualification
1	Portugal	3	3	0	0	6	2	+4	9	Final tournament
2	Russia	3	2	0	1	7	4	+3	6	Final tournament
3	Poland	3	0	1	2	4	6	−2	1	
4	Scotland (H)	3	0	1	2	1	6	−5	1	

Source: UEFA
Rules for classification: Qualification tiebreakers
(H) Hosts
20 March 2019
14:00 (13:00 GMT)

Poland	2–3	Russia
Biegański 4'; Marchwiński 39'	Report	Gubzhokov 17'; Oznobikhin 50'; Shapovalov 78'

Firhill Stadium, Glasgow
Referee: Helgi Mikael Jónasson (Iceland)
20 March 2019
19:00 (18:00 GMT)

Portugal	2–0	Scotland
Gerson 4'; Silva 25'	Report

St Mirren Park, Paisley
Referee: Oskari Hämäläinen (Finland)

23 March 2019
13:00 (12:00 GMT)

Portugal	2–1	Poland
Brazão 10'; Gerson 29'	Report	Zalewski 79'

Cappielow Park, Greenock
Referee: Ümit Öztürk (Turkey)
23 March 2019
17:00 (16:00 GMT)

Russia	3–0	Scotland
Konyukhov 24'; Savinov 32'; Shapovalov 71'	Report

St Mirren Park, Paisley
Referee: Oskari Hämäläinen (Finland)

26 March 2019
18:00 (17:00 GMT)

Russia	1–2	Portugal
Shchetinin 18'	Report	Quizera 9' (pen.); Silva 81'

Cappielow Park, Greenock
Referee: Ümit Öztürk (Turkey)
26 March 2019
18:00 (17:00 GMT)

Scotland	1–1	Poland
Dickson-Peters 82'	Report	Rakoczy 7'

Firhill Stadium, Glasgow
Referee: Helgi Mikael Jónasson (Iceland)

==== Group 7 ====
Pos	Team	Pld	W	D	L	GF	GA	GD	Pts	Qualification
1	Belgium	3	3	0	0	8	2	+6	9	Final tournament
2	Hungary (H)	3	2	0	1	4	4	0	6	Final tournament
3	Norway	3	1	0	2	2	5	−3	3	
4	Bosnia and Herzegovina	3	0	0	3	1	4	−3	0	

Source: UEFA
Rules for classification: Qualification tiebreakers
(H) Hosts
26 March 2019
16:00

Belgium	1–0	Bosnia and Herzegovina
Engolo 14'	Report

Pancho Aréna pitch 4, Felcsút
Referee: Morten Krogh (Denmark)
26 March 2019
20:00

Norway	0–1	Hungary
	Report	Zuigeber 90'

Globall Football Park, Telki
Referee: Rahim Hasanov (Azerbaijan)

29 March 2019
16:00

Belgium	3–0	Norway
Kalulika 37', 72'; Doku 67'	Report

Hévízi úti Stadion, Budapest
Referee: Aristotelis Diamantopoulos (Greece)
29 March 2019
16:00

Hungary	1–0	Bosnia and Herzegovina
Zuigeber 37'	Report

Globall Football Park, Telki
Referee: Morten Krogh (Denmark)

1 April 2019
16:30

Hungary	2–4	Belgium
Szalay 11'; Kalmár 85'	Report	Doku 29' (pen.), 56' (pen.); Landu 45'; Baeten 48'

Globall Football Park, Telki
Referee: Aristotelis Diamantopoulos (Greece)
1 April 2019
16:30

Bosnia and Herzegovina	1–2	Norway
Bobarič 90+3'	Report	Tveiten 49'; Melkersen 88'

Pancho Aréna pitch 4, Felcsút
Referee: Rahim Hasanov (Azerbaijan)

==== Group 8 ====
Pos	Team	Pld	W	D	L	GF	GA	GD	Pts	Qualification
1	France	3	3	0	0	6	0	+6	9	Final tournament
2	Sweden	3	1	1	1	2	3	−1	4	Final tournament
3	Serbia (H)	3	1	0	2	4	4	0	3	
4	Slovakia	3	0	1	2	1	6	−5	1	

Source: UEFA
Rules for classification: Qualification tiebreakers
(H) Hosts
26 March 2019
12:00

Sweden	0–2	France
	Report	Traoré 4'; Agoumé 79' (pen.)

Sports Center of FA of Serbia, Stara Pazova
Referee: Robert Hennessy (Republic of Ireland)
26 March 2019
17:00

Slovakia	1–3	Serbia
Mojžiš 32'	Report	Blagojević 2'; Babić 47'; Ergelas 78'

Sports Center of FA of Serbia, Stara Pazova
Referee: Bram Van Driessche (Belgium)

29 March 2019
12:00

Slovakia	0–0	Sweden
	Report

Sports Center of FA of Serbia, Stara Pazova
Referee: Emmanouil Skoulas (Greece)
29 March 2019
17:00

France	1–0	Serbia
Mbuku 7'	Report

Sports Center of FA of Serbia, Stara Pazova
Referee: Robert Hennessy (Republic of Ireland)

1 April 2019
14:00

France	3–0	Slovakia
Agoumé 24'; Leitner 44' (o.g.); Aouchiche 81' (pen.)	Report

Zemun Stadium, Belgrade
Referee: Bram Van Driessche (Belgium)
1 April 2019
14:00

Serbia	1–2	Sweden
Kremenović 89'	Report	Prica 40' (pen.), 90+5'

Sports Center of FA of Serbia, Stara Pazova
Referee: Emmanouil Skoulas (Greece)

=== Ranking of second-placed teams ===
To determine the seven best second-placed teams from the elite round which qualify for the final tournament, only the results of the second-placed teams against the first and third-placed teams in their group are taken into account.

Pos	Grp	Team	Pld	W	D	L	GF	GA	GD	Pts	Qualification
1	1	Austria	2	1	0	1	6	5	+1	3	Final tournament
2	6	Russia	2	1	0	1	4	4	0	3	Final tournament
3	7	Hungary	2	1	0	1	3	4	−1	3	Final tournament
4	8	Sweden	2	1	0	1	2	3	−1	3	Final tournament
5	5	Greece	2	1	0	1	1	2	−1	3	Final tournament
6	2	Czech Republic	2	1	0	1	3	5	−2	3	Final tournament
7	4	Germany	2	0	2	0	4	4	0	2	Final tournament
8	3	Croatia	2	0	2	0	1	1	0	2	

Source: UEFA
Rules for classification: 1) points; 2) goal difference; 3) goals scored; 4) disciplinary points; 5) coefficient; 6) drawing of lots.

== Qualified teams ==
The following 16 teams qualify for the final tournament.

Team	Qualified as	Qualified on	Previous appearances in Under-17 Euro^{1} only U-17 era (since 2002)
Republic of Ireland	Hosts	9 December 2016	4 (2008, 2015, 2017, 2018)
Italy	Elite round Group 1 winners	26 March 2019	8 (2003, 2005, 2009, 2013, 2015, 2016, 2017, 2018)
Netherlands	Elite round Group 2 winners	26 March 2019	12 (2002, 2005, 2007, 2008, 2009, **2011**, **2012**, 2014, 2015, 2016, 2017, **2018**)
England	Elite round Group 3 winners	27 March 2019	13 (2002, 2003, 2004, 2005, 2007, 2009, **2010**, 2011, **2014**, 2015, 2016, 2017, 2018)
Iceland	Elite round Group 4 winners	26 March 2019	2 (2007, 2012)
Spain	Elite round Group 5 winners	31 March 2019	12 (2002, 2003, 2004, 2006, **2007**, **2008**, 2009, 2010, 2015, 2016, **2017**, 2018)
Portugal	Elite round Group 6 winners	26 March 2019	7 (2002, **2003**, 2004, 2010, 2014, **2016**, 2018)
Belgium	Elite round Group 7 winners	29 March 2019	6 (2006, 2007, 2012, 2015, 2016, 2018)
France	Elite round Group 8 winners	29 March 2019	11 (2002, **2004**, 2007, 2008, 2009, 2010, 2011, 2012, **2015**, 2016, 2017)
Austria	Elite round best seven runners-up	26 March 2019	5 (2003, 2004, 2013, 2015, 2016)
Russia	Elite round best seven runners-up	26 March 2019	3 (**2006**, **2013**, 2015)
Hungary	Elite round best seven runners-up	29 March 2019	4 (2002, 2003, 2006, 2017)
Sweden	Elite round best seven runners-up	1 April 2019	3 (2013, 2016, 2018)
Greece	Elite round best seven runners-up	31 March 2019	2 (2010, 2015)
Czech Republic	Elite round best seven runners-up	26 March 2019	5 (2002, 2006, 2010, 2011, 2015)
Germany	Elite round best seven runners-up	27 March 2019	11 (2002, 2006, 2007, **2009**, 2011, 2012, 2014, 2015, 2016, 2017, 2018)

^{1} Bold indicates champions for that year. Italic indicates hosts for that year.

== Goalscorers ==
In the qualifying round, there were 309 goals scored in 78 matches, for an average of 3.96 goals per match. In the elite round, there were 132 goals scored in 48 matches, for an average of 2.75 goals per match. In total, there were 441 goals scored in 126 matches, for an average of 3.5 goals per match.

8 goals

- (Russia) Kirill Shchetinin

7 goals

- (Netherlands) Naoufal Bannis
- (Netherlands) Brian Brobbey

6 goals

- (Iceland) Ísak Bergmann Jóhannesson

5 goals

- (Belgium) Jérémy Doku
- (Greece) Christos Tzolis
- (Italy) Nicolò Cudrig
- (Italy) Sebastiano Esposito
- (Portugal) Gerson
- (Sweden) Tim Prica

4 goals

- (Austria) Deniz Pehlivan
- (Czech Republic) Vojtěch Wojatschke
- (Hungary) Ákos Zuigeber
- (Iceland) Andri Guðjohnsen
- (Netherlands) Mohamed Taabouni
- (Northern Ireland) Ben Wylie
- (Portugal) Famana Quizera
- (Romania) Louis Munteanu
- (Sweden) Karl Landsten
- (Ukraine) Eric Shuranov
- (Ukraine) Heorhii Sudakov

3 goals

- (Belgium) François Xavier Engolo
- (Belgium) Franck Idumbo-Mazumbo
- (Bosnia and Herzegovina) Ajdin Jusupović
- (Bulgaria) Martin Petkov
- (Croatia) Jakov Anton Vasilj
- (Czech Republic) Adam Hložek
- (Denmark) Noah Crone
- (France) Adil Aouchiche
- (Israel) Liroy Gabay
- (Italy) Franco Tongya
- (Netherlands) Sontje Hansen
- (Netherlands) Ki-Jana Hoever
- (Norway) Fredrik Oppegård
- (Poland) Filip Marchwiński
- (Romania) Ianis Stoica
- (Russia) Egor Shapovalov
- (Slovakia) Roman Čerepkai
- (Slovakia) Tomáš Suslov
- (Slovenia) Vanja Panič
- (Spain) Kepa Uriarte
- (Sweden) Sebastian Nanasi

2 goals

- (Austria) Benjamin Böckle
- (Austria) Yusuf Demir
- (Austria) Bernhard Zimmermann
- (Belarus) Aleksandr Shestyuk
- (Belgium) Chris Kalulika
- (Bosnia and Herzegovina) Faruk Duraković
- (Croatia) Gabriel Groznica
- (Czech Republic) Antonín Svoboda
- (Denmark) Hektor Højberre-Thomsen
- (England) Sam Greenwood
- (England) Noni Madueke
- (England) Morgan Rogers
- (France) Lucien Agoumé
- (France) Teo Zidane
- (Germany) Karim Adeyemi
- (Iceland) Andri Fannar Baldursson
- (Iceland) Danijel Dejan Djuric
- (Iceland) Mikael Egill Ellertsson
- (Iceland) Davíð Snær Jóhannsson
- (Israel) Suf Podgoreanu
- (Israel) Tal Torgeman
- (Italy) Nicholas Bonfanti
- (Italy) Francesco Lamanna
- (Latvia) Jēkabs Lagūns
- (Luxembourg) Alessio Curci
- (North Macedonia) Behar Feta
- (North Macedonia) Azer Omeragić
- (Netherlands) Jayden Braaf
- (Netherlands) Jaymillio Pinas
- (Netherlands) Dirk Proper
- (Northern Ireland) Darragh Burns
- (Norway) Herman Geelmuyden
- (Poland) Hubert Turski
- (Poland) Marcel Wędrychowski
- (Poland) Nicola Zalewski
- (Portugal) Paulo Bernardo
- (Portugal) Pedro Brazão
- (Portugal) Ronaldo Camará
- (Portugal) Daniel Rodrigues
- (Portugal) Fábio Silva
- (Russia) Dmitri Kratkov
- (Russia) Daniil Shamkin
- (Scotland) Lewis Fiorini
- (Scotland) Andrew Winter
- (Serbia) Danilo Miladinović
- (Slovakia) Adam Matoš
- (Slovenia) Benjamin Šeško
- (Spain) Jordi Escobar
- (Spain) Adrián Gómez
- (Spain) Israel Salazar
- (Switzerland) Fabian Rieder
- (Turkey) Muhammet Akpınar
- (Ukraine) Edvard Kobak
- (Ukraine) Vladyslav Vanat

1 goal

- (Albania) Elmando Gjini
- (Albania) Mario Mitaj
- (Andorra) Joan Bellido
- (Andorra) Pablo Romero
- (Andorra) Albert Rosas
- (Austria) Matthias Braunöder
- (Austria) Felix Köchl
- (Austria) Paul-Friedrich Koller
- (Austria) Simon Nelson
- (Austria) Manuel Polster
- (Austria) Stefan Radulovic
- (Azerbaijan) Musa Gurbanli
- (Belarus) Ruslan Lisakovich
- (Belarus) Maksim Natynchik
- (Belarus) Aleksei Shalashnikov
- (Belarus) Kirill Zabelin
- (Belgium) Ameen Al Dakhil
- (Belgium) Thibo Baeten
- (Belgium) Anouar Ait El Hadj
- (Belgium) Jeremy Landu
- (Bosnia and Herzegovina) Omar Beća
- (Bosnia and Herzegovina) Belmin Bobarič
- (Bosnia and Herzegovina) Andrija Drljo
- (Bosnia and Herzegovina) Nemanja Jović
- (Bosnia and Herzegovina) Samir Mujkanović
- (Bosnia and Herzegovina) Sergej Vintonji
- (Bulgaria) Krasimir Panchev
- (Croatia) Stipe Biuk
- (Croatia) Luka Branšteter
- (Croatia) Joško Gvardiol
- (Croatia) Jurica Jurčec
- (Croatia) Luka Sučić
- (Cyprus) Konstantinos Georgallides
- (Czech Republic) Lukáš Hroník
- (Czech Republic) David Pech
- (Czech Republic) Václav Sejk
- (Czech Republic) Michal Ševčík
- (Czech Republic) Filip Šilhart
- (Denmark) Frederik Carstensen
- (Denmark) Wahidullah Faghir
- (Denmark) Jacob Haahr
- (Denmark) Alexander Lind
- (Denmark) Aral Simsir
- (Denmark) Oliver Sørensen
- (Denmark) Mads Zaar
- (England) Joe Gelhardt
- (Estonia) Erik Kruglov
- (Estonia) Aleksandr Šapovalov
- (Finland) Sampo Ala
- (Finland) Samuel Anini Jr.
- (Finland) Adam Marhiev
- (Finland) Eetu Rissanen
- (France) Haissem Hassan
- (France) Yann Kembo
- (France) Nianzou Kouassi
- (France) Nathanaël Mbuku
- (France) Amadou Traoré
- (Georgia (country)) Giorgi Abuashvili
- (Georgia (country)) Tornike Morchiladze
- (Germany) Jannis Lang
- (Germany) Luca Netz
- (Germany) Malik Tillman
- (Hungary) Péter Baráth
- (Hungary) Benedek Kalmár
- (Hungary) György Komáromi
- (Hungary) Szabolcs Szalay
- (Iceland) Jón Gísli Eyland Gíslason
- (Israel) Ethane Azoulay
- (Israel) Shalev Harush
- (Israel) Doron Leidner
- (Italy) Michael Brentan
- (Italy) Stefano Cester
- (Italy) Lorenzo Moretti
- (Italy) Gaetano Oristanio
- (Italy) Raffaele Spina
- (Kazakhstan) Tenizbay Abdurakhmanov
- (Kazakhstan) Adilkhan Dobay
- (Kosovo) Milot Avdyli
- (Kosovo) Oltion Bilalli
- (Kosovo) Valon Zumberi
- (Latvia) Deniss Meļņiks
- (Liechtenstein) Yannick Allaart
- (Lithuania) Eimantas Abramavičius
- (Luxembourg) Yann Hoffmann
- (North Macedonia) Ivan Nikolov
- (Malta) Karl Mohnani
- (Malta) Matthia Veselji
- (Moldova) Daniel Danu
- (Moldova) Piotr Gherman
- (Montenegro) Vuk Dapčević
- (Montenegro) Ognjen Gasevic
- (Netherlands) Soulyman Allouch
- (Netherlands) Ian Maatsen
- (Netherlands) Mohamed Sankoh
- (Netherlands) Naci Ünüvar
- (Northern Ireland) Dale Taylor
- (Norway) Elias Hoff Melkersen
- (Norway) Robin Bjørkås Skrogstad
- (Norway) Mikkel Tveiten
- (Norway) Nils Vallotto
- (Poland) Jan Biegański
- (Poland) Kacper Kozłowski
- (Poland) Jakub Niewiadomski
- (Poland) Michał Rakoczy
- (Portugal) Gonçalo Batalha
- (Portugal) Filipe Cruz
- (Portugal) Bruno Tavares
- (Portugal) Tiago Tomás
- (Romania) Radu Dragusin
- (Romania) Alexi Pitu
- (Russia) Islam-Bek Gubzhokov
- (Russia) Vadim Konyukhov
- (Russia) Nikita Kotin
- (Russia) Oleg Oznobikhin
- (Russia) Andrei Savinov
- (Scotland) Thomas Dickson-Peters
- (Serbia) Ilija Babić
- (Serbia) Mihajlo Baic
- (Serbia) Uroš Blagojević
- (Serbia) Nikola Colic
- (Serbia) Mitar Ergelas
- (Serbia) Milan Kremenović
- (Slovakia) Patrik Leitner
- (Slovakia) Adrián Mojžiš
- (Slovakia) Sebastian Nebyla
- (Slovakia) Martin Šviderský
- (Slovakia) Filip Szetei
- (Slovenia) Martin Pečar
- (Spain) Alejandro Blesa
- (Spain) Pablo Moreno
- (Spain) Miguel Rodríguez
- (Spain) Beñat Turrientes
- (Spain) Germán Varela
- (Sweden) Dennis Collander
- (Switzerland) Josip Brnic
- (Switzerland) Yannick Cotter
- (Switzerland) Gabriele De Donno
- (Switzerland) Samuel Kasongo
- (Switzerland) Nils Reichmuth
- (Switzerland) Leonidas Stergiou
- (Turkey) Polat Abay
- (Turkey) Ali Akman
- (Turkey) Kemal Bayrak
- (Turkey) Ferhat Çoğalan
- (Turkey) Halil Ibrahim Sevinç
- (Turkey) Gülhan Üreyen
- (Ukraine) Arsenii Batahov
- (Ukraine) Viktor Bliznichenko
- (Ukraine) Volodymyr Brazhko
- (Ukraine) Danylo Honcharuk
- (Ukraine) Danil Skorko
- (Ukraine) Bogdan V'Yunnik
- (Wales) Bradley Gibbings
- (Wales) Michael Sparkes
- (Wales) Joshua Thomas

1 own goal

- (Austria) Paul-Friedrich Koller (against Italy)
- (Belarus) Vladislav Kalinin (against Portugal)
- (Croatia) Aljaž Džankić (against Denmark)
- (Denmark) Daniel Obbekjær (against Estonia)
- (Finland) Tony Miettinen (against France)
- (France) Timothée Pembele (against Poland)
- (Gibraltar) Samuel Yeo (against Bosnia and Herzegovina)
- (Poland) Jakub Niewiadomski (against France)
- (Slovakia) Patrik Leitner (against France)
- Gabriele De Donno (against Switzerland)
- (Switzerland) Elmedin Fazlic (against England)
- (Ukraine) Kostyantyn Vivcharenko (against Iceland)
- (Wales) David Robson (against Belarus)

Source: UEFA.com
