= Jurčec =

Jurčec is a Croatian surname. Notable people with the surname include:

- Jan Jurčec (born 2000), Croatian footballer
- Jurica Jurčec (born 2002) Croatian footballer
- Renato Jurčec (born 1966), Croatian footballer
