= Jóhann Guðmundsson =

Jóhann Guðmundsson or Johann Gudmundsson may refer to:

- Jóhann Birnir Guðmundsson (born 1977), retired Icelandic footballer who previously played for Watford
- Jóhann Berg Guðmundsson (born 1990), Icelandic footballer who plays for Burnley
