= Ağca =

Ağca [ˈɑːdʒɑ] is a surname. Notable people with the surname include:

- Elif Ağca (born 1984), Turkish volleyball player
- Mehmet Ali Ağca (born 1958), Turkish assassin who shot and wounded Pope John Paul II on May 13, 1981
- Rohat Agca (born 2001), Dutch footballer
