= Oltion Bilalli =

Kosovan footballer

Personal information
- Date of birth: 3 January 2002 (age 24)
- Place of birth: Gjilan, Kosovo under UN administration
- Height: 1.76 m (5 ft 9 in)
- Position: Winger

Team information
- Current team: Gjilani
- Number: 7

Youth career
- 2012–2017: Besëlidhja Prishtinë
- 2017–2019: Galatasaray Kosova Football School
- 2019–2020: Gjilani
- 2020: Balikesirspor

Senior career*
Years	Team	Apps	(Gls)
2020–2022	Balikesirspor	27	(0)
2022–	Gjilani	113	(12)

International career^{‡}
2017	Kosovo U16	4	(1)
2018–2019	Kosovo U17	5	(1)
2023	Kosovo U21	3	(0)
- * Club domestic league appearances and goals as of 19 October 2026 ‡ National team caps and goals as of 21 November 2023

Oltion Bilalli (born 3 January 2002) is a Kosovar professional Kosovan footballer who plays as a winger for the Kosovan club SC Gjilani.

== Club career ==
Bilalli was in Beselidhja (Galatasaray Kosova Football School) which had a relation with Galatasaray, one of the biggest teams. While at Beselidhja, Bilalli played in all the youth teams, including U13, U15 and U17. In these categories, he scored more than 200 goals in 7 years. Then he made a transfer to SC Gjilani U19 in which he played for 6 months, scoring 15 goals and assisting 6 in 14 matches.

On 15 January 2020, Bilalli joined Turkey's second league side Balikesirspor but he couldn't immediately sign a professional contract due to a club punishment by the Turkish Federation. The contract was eventually signed on 4 August 2020, allowing him to make his debut on 14 September against Giresunspor.

On 22 September, Bilalli joined Kosovo's Super league side SC Gjilani as a free agent. On 9 October he made his debut against FC Ferizaj.

== International career ==
Bilalli represented Kosovo U17 in the 2019 UEFA European Under-17 Championship qualifications, scoring a goal and helping Kosovo top their group in the initial qualifying round.
