= Sergen Yatağan =

Turkish footballer

Personal information
- Full name: Sergen Yatağan
- Date of birth: 17 May 1999 (age 27)
- Place of birth: Manavgat, Turkey
- Height: 1.80 m (5 ft 11 in)
- Position: Midfielder

Team information
- Current team: Yeni Mersin İY
- Number: 97

Youth career
- 2008–2012: Ilıca Belediyespor
- 2012–2013: Gençlerbirliği
- 2013–2019: Antalyaspor

Senior career*
Years	Team	Apps	(Gls)
2019–2021	Antalyaspor	1	(0)
2019–2021	→ Bodrumspor (loan)	38	(6)
2021–2023	Bodrumspor	11	(0)
2022	→ Karacabey Belediyespor (loan)	20	(1)
2022–2023	→ Serik Belediyespor (loan)	24	(0)
2023–2024	Kırşehir Futbol SK	14	(2)
2024–2025	Vanspor	10	(0)
2025	Adana 01 FK	14	(2)
2025–	Yeni Mersin İY	5	(0)
- * Club domestic league appearances and goals as of 5 October 2025

Sergen Yatağan (born 17 May 1999) is a Turkish footballer who plays as a midfielder for TFF 2. Lig club Yeni Mersin İY.

== Career ==
Yatağan is a youth product of the academies of Ilıca Belediyespor, Gençlerbirliği and Antalyaspor. He was promoted to the senior team in 2019, and signed a professional contract. He made his professional debut for Antalyaspor in a 3-3 Turkish Cup win over MKE Ankaragücü on 15 January 2019. He joined Bodrumspor on loan for the 2019–20 season, which was extended for another year after. He signed permanently with Bodrumspor in 2021, signing a 5-year contract with the club. In January 2022, he joined Karacabey Belediyespor on loan for the second half of the 2021–22 season. The following season, he was loaned to Serik Belediyespor in the TFF Second League.
