= Nurullah Aslan =

Turkish footballer

Personal information
- Date of birth: 5 July 1997 (age 29)
- Place of birth: Samsun, Turkey
- Height: 2.02 m (6 ft 8 in)
- Position: Goalkeeper

Team information
- Current team: Yeni Mersin İY
- Number: 1

Youth career
- 2007-2015: Termespor

Senior career*
Years	Team	Apps	(Gls)
2016–2019	Erbaaspor	47	(0)
2019–2023	Samsunspor	86	(0)
2022–2023	→ Ankaragücü (loan)	0	(0)
2023	→ Gençlerbirliği (loan)	12	(0)
2023–2024	Vanspor FK	35	(1)
2024–2025	Amedspor	16	(0)
2025	Adanaspor	18	(0)
2025–	Yeni Mersin İY	11	(0)
- * Club domestic league appearances and goals as of 9 November 2025

Nurullah Aslan (born 5 July 1997) is a Turkish professional footballer who plays as a goalkeeper for TFF 2. Lig club Yeni Mersin İY.

== Career ==
Nurullah Aslan began his career in 2007 as a defender for his local club Termespor, later making the switch to goalkeeper. After playing at amateur levels, he signed his first professional contract with Erbaaspor in 2016. Aslan appeared in a total of 51 matches for Erbaaspor, including matches in the Turkish Cup.

Samsunspor signed Aslan from Erbaaspor in December 2018 and signed a 4.5-year deal with him. Aslan became the first-choice keeper of the club, and helped the club win the TFF Second League title in the 2019-20 season and gain promotion to the TFF First League. Aslan remained as the club's first-choice goalkeeper in the TFF First League and played the full 90 minutes in all of the club's matches in his first season in the TFF First League before suffering a drop of form in his second season and losing his spot. He was loaned out to Süper Lig club Ankaragücü for the 2022–23 season, but his loan deal was terminated in December 2022. He was then loaned out to fellow TFF First League club Gençlerbirliği for the remainder of the season.
