= Muhammet Akpınar =

Turkish footballer (born 2002)

Personal information
- Date of birth: 6 February 2002 (age 24)
- Place of birth: Trabzon, Turkey
- Height: 1.85 m (6 ft 1 in)
- Position: Forward

Team information
- Current team: Kırklarelispor
- Number: 11

Youth career
- 2013–2015: Bayburtspor
- 2015–2019: Trabzonspor

Senior career*
Years	Team	Apps	(Gls)
2019–2022	Trabzonspor	0	(0)
2021–2022	→ Adıyaman (loan)	33	(5)
2022–2024	Serik Belediyespor	64	(10)
2024–2025	Yeni Mersin İY	23	(0)
2025–	Kırklarelispor	12	(2)

International career^{‡}
2018–2019	Turkey U17	14	(3)
2019–2020	Turkey U18	7	(1)
- * Club domestic league appearances and goals as of 7 December 2025 ‡ National team caps and goals as of 11 February 2020

Muhammet Akpınar (born 6 February 2002) is a Turkish professional footballer who plays as a forward for TFF 2. Lig club Kırklarelispor.

== Professional career ==
On 4 July 2019, Akpınar signed his first professional contract with Trabzonspor. Akpınar made his professional debut for Trabznnspor in a 3–1 UEFA Europa League loss to FC Krasnodar on 7 November 2019.

== Honours ==
Trabzonspor

- Turkish Cup: 2019–20
