= F.C. Ashdod =

Israeli football club

- Full name: Moadon Sport Ashdod
- Nicknames: הדולפינים (The Dolphins) הקבוצה מעיר הנמל (The Port City Team)
- Founded: 1999; 27 years ago
- Ground: Yud-Alef Stadium, Ashdod
- Capacity: 7,800
- Owner: M.S. Ashdod Supporters trust
- Chairman: Rafi Niddam
- League: Israeli Premier League
- 2025–26: Israeli Premier League, 13th of 14 (relegated)
- Website: www.fcashdod.co.il
| Home colours | Away colours | Third colours |

Moadon Sport Ashdod (Hebrew: מועדון ספורט אשדוד, lit. 'Sport Club Ashdod'), commonly referred to as F.C. Ashdod or M.S. Ashdod (מ.ס. אשדוד), is an Israeli professional football club, playing in the port city of Ashdod. The unusual name of the team (unlike most Israeli football teams, this one only indicates the club's home city without any specific Jewish sporting association, such as Hapoel, Maccabi, or Beitar) is the result of the union of two city rivals, Hapoel Ashdod and Maccabi Ironi Ashdod in 1999. The club currently plays in the Liga Leumit.

== History ==
A chart showing the progress of Ashdod S.C. through the Israeli football league system, from 1999–2000 to the present

During the club's first years, its kit colors were completely blue. However, when Israeli footballer Haim Revivo took a more prominent role in the club, the colors were changed to red and yellow. The decision was made that the kit should incorporate the previous two clubs' colors, Hapoel having been red and Maccabi yellow.

The club was not immediately successful after the merger, and fan support was lacking. During the 2004–05 season, they reached their greatest achievement, a third-place finish in the Israeli Premier League and a berth in the UEFA Cup. The club also reached the final of the Israeli Toto Cup, only to go out on penalty kicks. Their first time in a continental competition was not a memorable one, as they went out to the Slovenian PrvaLiga runners-up, NK Domžale.

Prior to the 2014–15 season, the club added Ironi to its name. However, following a dispute with fans of the previous club, Maccabi Ironi Ashdod, during the 2–3 defeat against Maccabi Netanya in the last match of the regular season, the club's chairman, Jacky Ben-Zaken, decided to rename the club to Hapoel Ashdod and to play in red shirts. Despite warnings from the Israel Football Association, which informed the club that such changes during season are illegal, Ashdod did show up for their next match, which opened the Bottom playoff, against Hapoel Ra'anana in red shirts, with the caption "F.C. Hapoel Ashdod", and was eventually disciplined. Furthermore, the club was punished by FIFA with six points deduction for failing to pay an arbitration award to Nigerian club, Kaduna United, for the transfer of Efe Ambrose in 2010. As a result, the club has been dropped to the bottom place in the Israeli Premier League. However, in an exceptional decision, FIFA reversed its decision after it was found out that the club did pay the arbitration award. At the end of the season, the club finished at the bottom of the league, after failing to register a win during their last 15 matches, and for the first time in their history, were relegated to the second tier, Liga Leumit, following a 0–1 defeat against Hapoel Tel Aviv.

In the 2015–16 season, the club won Liga Leumit and made an immediate return to the Israeli Premier League.

== Players ==
=== Current squad ===
Updated 28 September 2026

| No. | Pos. | Nation | Player |
|---|---|---|---|
| 1 | GK | ISR | Roy Shohat |
| 2 | DF | ISR | Ahmad Abu Much |
| 3 | DF | CIV | Ibrahim Diakité |
| 5 | DF | ISR | Maor Yashilirmak |
| 6 | MF | NGR | Victor Ochayi |
| 7 | FW | ISR | Nehoray Dabush |
| 8 | MF | ISR | Roei Gordana |
| 9 | MF | ISR | Shalev Harush |
| 10 | MF | ISR | Ilay Tamam |
| 15 | DF | ISR | Tom Ben Zaken (captain) |
| 17 | DF | ISR | Asaf Arania |
| 18 | MF | ISR | Maor Kuba |
| 19 | MF | ISR | Amitay Yamin |
| 20 | DF | ISR | Reem Tal |
| 21 | FW | ISR | Elia Gethon |
| 23 | MF | ISR | Dor Micha |

| No. | Pos. | Nation | Player |
|---|---|---|---|
| 27 | DF | ISR | Ran Vaturi |
| 28 | FW | GHA | Ebenezer Mamatah |
| 29 | FW | ISR | Idan Peretz |
| 46 | GK | ISR | Razi Abu Hamdan |
| 47 | FW | ISR | Mesirh Abu Bilal |
| 55 | DF | ISR | Raz Meir |
| 71 | DF | ISR | Amit Denzinger |
| 72 | FW | ISR | Osama Khalaila |
| 73 | DF | ISR | Max Grechkin |
| 77 | MF | GHA | Hayford Boahen |
| 80 | FW | ISR | Ben Levy |
| 87 | MF | ISR | Mohammed Amer |
| 99 | FW | ISR | Ori Malka |
| — | MF | ISR | Ori Edri |
| — | | ISR | Itay Hazut (on loan from Hapoel Be'er Sheva) |

=== Out on loan ===
| No. | Pos. | Nation | Player |

=== Other players under contract ===
| No. | Pos. | Nation | Player |
|---|---|---|---|
| — | GK | ISR | Tomer Amar |

=== Foreigners 2023–24 ===
Only up six non-Israeli nationals can be in an Israeli club squad (only five can play at the same time). Those with Jewish ancestry, married to an Israeli or have played in Israel for an extended period of time, can claim a passport or permanent residency which would allow them to play with Israeli status.

- (Cameroon) Martin Atemengue
- (Ghana) Ebenezer Mamatah
- (Scotland) Clark Robertson
- (Uganda) Timothy Awany

== Managers ==
- (Israel) Yossi Mizrahi (2004, 21 April 2008 – 20 May 2010)
- (England) John Gregory (1 July 2010 – 18 April 2011)
- (Israel) Yossi Mizrahi (18 April 2011 – 30 June 2013)
- (Israel) Nir Klinger (1 July 2013 – 7 June 2015)
- (Israel) Eyal Lahman (7 June 2015 – 18 December 2015)
- (Israel) Ronny Awat (18 December 2015 – 14 February 2017)
- (Israel) Ran Ben Shimon (14 February 2017 – 5 July 2017)
- (Israel) Yossi Mizrahi (16 July 2017 – 3 August 2017) (caretaker)
- (Israel) Reuven Atar (3 August 2017 – 3 October 2017)
- (Israel) Amir Turgeman (10 October 2017 – 24 April 2018)
- (Israel) Yossi Mizrahi (24 April 2018 – 11 May 2018)
- (North Macedonia) Blagoja Milevski (11 May 2018 – November 2018)
- (Israel) Yuval Naim (November 2018 – January 2019)
- (Israel) Moshe Ohayon (January 2019 – February 2019)
- (Israel) Avi Buchbut (February 2019 – June 2019)
- (Israel) Ronny Awat (June 2019 – January 2020)
- (Israel) Ran Ben Shimon (January 2020 – June 2023)
- (Israel) Eli Levi (July 2023 – January 2025)

== European cup history ==
As of match played 29 July 2021

| Season | Competition | Round | Country | Club | Home | Away | Aggregate |
|---|---|---|---|---|---|---|---|
| 2005–06 | UEFA Cup | Q2 | Slovenia | Domžale | 2–2 | 1–1 | 3–3 (a) |
| 2021–22 | UEFA Europa Conference League | Q2 | Azerbaijan | Qarabağ | 0–1 | 0–0 | 0–1 |

== Club personnel ==
| Position | Person |
|---|---|
| Head Coach | (Israel) Klemi Saban |
| Assistant Coach | (Israel) Yitzhak Kenzel |
| Assistant Coach | (Israel) Ilay Goldberg |
| Assistant Coach | (Israel) Gal Edstein |
| Goalkeeper Coach | (Israel) Shlomo Bauman |
| Physiotherapist | (Israel) Idan Schmitz |
| Fitness Coach | (Israel) Ze'ev Gazinsky |
| Fitness Coach | (Israel) Ilan Oppenhaum |
| Doctor | (Israel) Moshe Helm |
| Academy Director | (Israel) Yehuda Zakaria |

== Kit makers ==
| Years | Kit manufacturers |
|---|---|
| 2000–2007 | Diadora |
| 2007–2009 | Sektor Sport |
| 2009–2013 | Nike |
| 2013–2014 | Legea |
| 2014–2016 | Nike |
| 2016–2017 | Jartazi |
| 2017–2025 | Nike |
| 2025- | Umbro |
