= Patrik Leitner =

Slovak footballer

Personal information
- Full name: Patrik Leitner
- Date of birth: 7 February 2002 (age 24)
- Place of birth: Žilina, Slovakia
- Height: 1.84 m (6 ft 0 in)
- Position: Defender

Team information
- Current team: Púchov (on loan from Ružomberok)

Youth career
- –2014: OZ Mládežnícky futbal Závodie
- 2014–2017: Akadémia Juventus Žilina
- 2017–2020: Žilina

Senior career*
Years	Team	Apps	(Gls)
2020–2025	Žilina B	38	(2)
2021–2025	Žilina	43	(1)
2024–2025	→ Chrudim (loan)	9	(0)
2025–	Ružomberok	0	(0)
2026–	→ Púchov (loan)	13	(0)

International career^{‡}
2018–2019	Slovakia U17	6	(1)
- * Club domestic league appearances and goals as of 25 May 2026 ‡ National team caps and goals as of 1 April 2019

Patrik Leitner (born 7 February 2002) is a Slovak professional footballer who currently plays for Púchov, on loan from Niké Liga club MFK Ružomberok as a defender.

== Club career ==
=== MŠK Žilina ===
Leitner made his Fortuna Liga debut for Žilina during a home fixture against FC ViOn Zlaté Moravce on 22 May 2021. He came on in the second half to replace Miroslav Gono in a 5-1 win for Žilina.

He scored his first goal in a 2-1 cup win against Komárno on his first start for the club.

=== MFK Chrudim (loan) ===
On 16 August 2024, Leitner joined Czech 2. Liga club Chrudim on a one-year loan deal with option.

== International career ==
In December 2022, Leitner was nominated by Francesco Calzona, who joined the side in late summer, for senior Slovak national team prospective players' training camp at NTC Senec.
