= Stefan Radulovic =

Austrian footballer (born 2002)

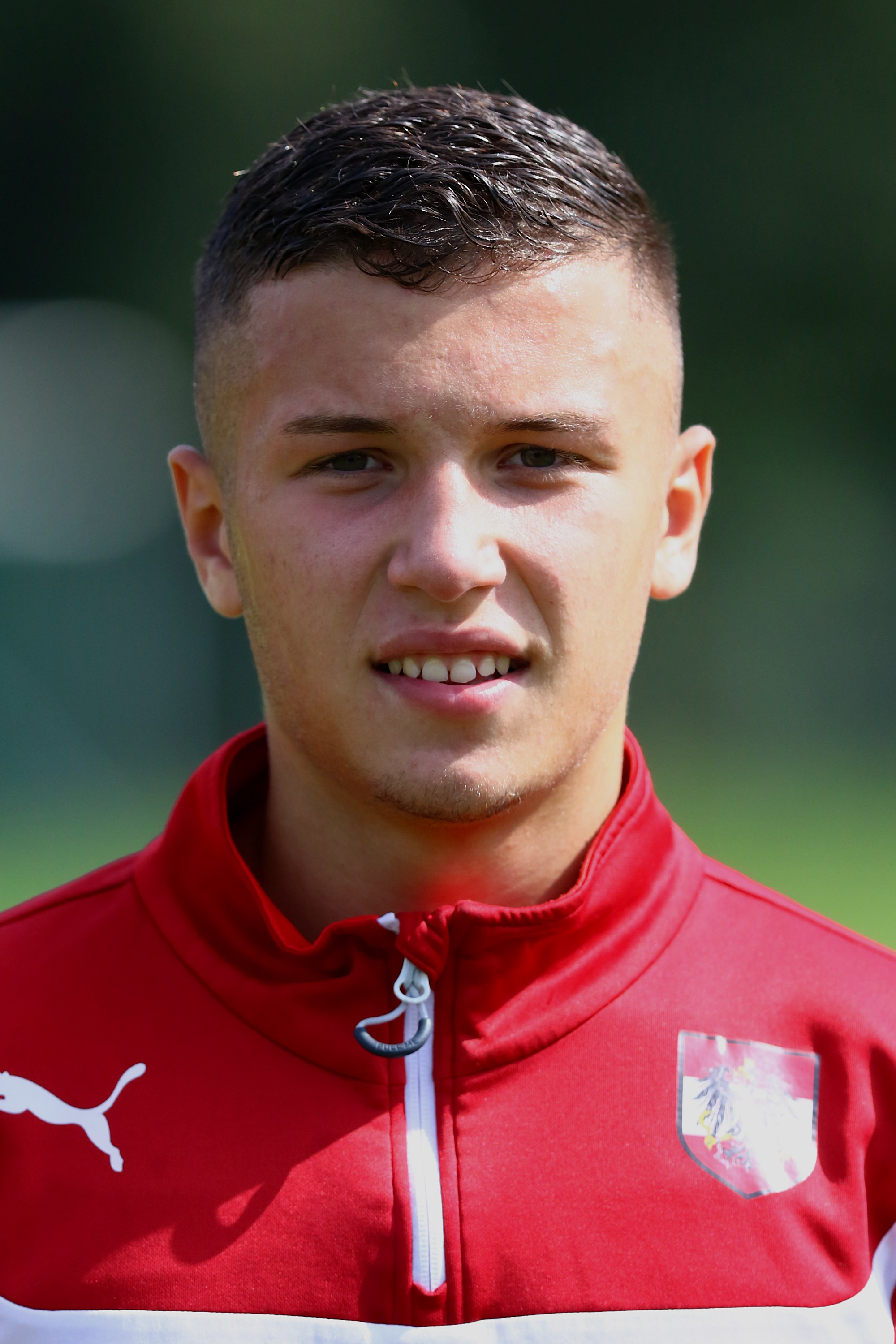
- Radulovic in 2018

Personal information
- Date of birth: 1 January 2002 (age 24)
- Place of birth: Vienna, Austria
- Height: 1.77 m (5 ft 10 in)
- Position: Midfielder

Team information
- Current team: SKU Amstetten
- Number: 66

Youth career
- 2009–2010: Wiener Viktoria
- 2010–2011: TWL Elektra
- 2011–2019: Austria Wien

Senior career*
Years	Team	Apps	(Gls)
2019–2021	Austria Wien II	45	(2)
2020–2021	Austria Wien	0	(0)
2021–2022	LASK	3	(0)
2021–2023	Juniors OÖ	34	(2)
2023	DSV Leoben	0	(0)
2024–	SKU Amstetten	10	(0)

International career^{‡}
2018–2019	Austria U17	13	(2)
2019–2020	Austria U18	5	(0)
- * Club domestic league appearances and goals as of 26 May 2024 ‡ National team caps and goals as of 16:15, 5 July 2022 (UTC)

Stefan Radulovic (born 1 January 2002) is an Austrian professional footballer who plays as a midfielder for SKU Amstetten.

== Career ==
Radulovic is a product of the youth academies of Wiener Viktoria, TWL Elektra and Austria Wien. On 2 June 2019, he was promoted to Austria Wien's reserves. He made his professional debut with Austria Wien in an Austrian Cup win over Wiener Sport-Club in October 2020. On 11 June 2021, he transferred to LASK, signing a contract until 2024. He was immediately loaned to Juniors OÖ in the 2. Liga for the 2021–22 season.

On 14 July 2023, Radulovic signed a contract with DSV Leoben.

== International career ==
Radulovic is a youth international for Austria, having represented the Austria U17s and U18s.
