= Viktor Bliznichenko =

Ukrainian footballer

Personal information
- Full name: Viktor Valeriyovych Bliznichenko
- Date of birth: 29 September 2002 (age 24)
- Place of birth: Novohrad-Volynskyi, Ukraine (now Zviahel)
- Height: 1.75 m (5 ft 9 in)
- Position: Defensive midfielder

Team information
- Current team: Obolon Kyiv
- Number: 7

Youth career
- 2014–2017: Dnipro
- 2017–2021: Dynamo Kyiv

Senior career*
Years	Team	Apps	(Gls)
2021–2024	Dynamo Kyiv	0	(0)
2022–2023	→ Inhulets Petrove (loan)	9	(0)
2023–2024	→ Kryvbas Kryvyi Rih (loan)	11	(1)
2024–	Obolon Kyiv	26	(2)

International career^{‡}
2017	Ukraine U15	2	(0)
2017	Ukraine U16	4	(0)
2018–2019	Ukraine U17	6	(1)
- * Club domestic league appearances and goals as of 1 June 2025 ‡ National team caps and goals as of 25 August 2022

Viktor Valeriyovych Bliznichenko (Ukrainian: Віктор Валерійович Блізніченко; born 29 September 2002) is a Ukrainian professional footballer who plays as a defensive midfielder for Obolon Kyiv.

== Career ==
=== Early years ===
Born in Novohrad-Volynskyi, Brazhko began his career at Dnipro from the homonymous city and then continued in the Dynamo Kyiv academy.

=== Dynamo Kyiv ===
He played in the Ukrainian Premier League Reserves and never made his debut for the senior Dynamo Kyiv squad.

==== Loan to Inhulets Petrove ====
In July 2022 Bliznichenko signed a two-year loan contract with Ukrainian Premier League side Inhulets Petrove and made his league debut for the club as a starting-squad player in a home match against Oleksandriya on 25 August 2022.

== Personal life ==
Viktor Bliznichenko is a younger brother of another Ukrainian footballer, Andriy Bliznichenko.
