= Francesco Lamanna =

Italian footballer (born 2002)

Personal information
- Date of birth: 11 January 2002 (age 24)
- Place of birth: Ivrea, Italy
- Height: 1.80 m (5 ft 11 in)
- Position: Right back

Youth career
- –2020: Juventus
- 2019–2020: → Cremonese (loan)

Senior career*
Years	Team	Apps	(Gls)
2020–2021	Novara	18	(0)
2021–2022	Gubbio	10	(0)

International career^{‡}
2018–2019	Italy U17	17	(3)
2019–2020	Italy U18	9	(0)
- * Club domestic league appearances and goals as of 23 April 2022 ‡ National team caps and goals as of 15 January 2020

Francesco Lamanna (born 11 January 2002) is an Italian professional footballer who plays as a right back.

== Club career ==
Born in Ivrea, Lamanna started his career in Juventus youth sector. For the 2019–20 season, he was loaned to Cremonese, for the Primavera team.

He left Juventus on 14 September 2020, and joined to Serie C club Novara. Lamanna made his professional debut on 27 September 2020 against Pro Vercelli.

On 3 September 2021, he signed with Gubbio. Lamanna's contract with Gubbio was terminated by mutual consent on 18 July 2022.

== International career ==
Lamanna was a youth international for Italy U17 and Italy U18 teams.

He played the 2019 FIFA U-17 World Cup in Brazil. Lamanna disputed four matches, included the quarter-final game against Brazil.
