= Mihajlo Baić =

Serbian association football player

Personal information
- Date of birth: 21 November 2002 (age 23)
- Place of birth: Subotica, FR Yugoslavia
- Height: 1.91 m (6 ft 3 in)
- Position: Forward

Team information
- Current team: Radnik Surdulica
- Number: 45

Youth career
- Partizan
- –2019: Čukarički
- 2019: Red Star Belgrade

Senior career*
Years	Team	Apps	(Gls)
2019–2021	Spartak Subotica	19	(0)
2021–2022	Čukarički	8	(2)
2022–2023	Osijek II	10	(2)
2022	→ Mura (loan)	2	(0)
2023	Lokomotiva Zagreb	0	(0)
2023–	Radnik Surdulica	7	(1)

International career
2018–2019	Serbia U17		
- * Club domestic league appearances and goals as of 27 December 2023

Mihajlo Baić (Serbian Cyrillic: Михајло Баић, born 21 November 2002) is a Serbian footballer who plays as a forward for Radnik Surdulica.

== Career statistics ==
=== Club ===
As of 20 June 2020

Appearances and goals by club, season and competition
Club	Season	League			National cup		Continental		Other		Total	
Club	Season	Division	Apps	Goals	Apps	Goals	Apps	Goals	Apps	Goals	Apps	Goals
Spartak Subotica	2019–20	Serbian SuperLiga	7	0	2	0	—		—		9	0
Career total			7	0	2	0	0	0	0	0	9	0
