= Elmando Gjini =

Albanian footballer

Personal information
- Date of birth: 28 August 2002 (age 24)
- Place of birth: Spånga, Sweden
- Height: 2.00 m (6 ft 7 in)
- Position: Centre-back

Team information
- Current team: Elbasani (on loan from Ballkani)
- Number: 92

Youth career
- 2017–2019: Brommapojkarna
- 2019–2020: Bologna
- 2020: Brommapojkarna
- 2020–2024: Genoa

Senior career*
Years	Team	Apps	(Gls)
2022–2024	Genoa	0	(0)
2022–2023	→ Amora (loan)	15	(1)
2024	Teuta	17	(2)
2024–	Ballkani	13	(0)
2025–26	→ Vllaznia Shkodër (loan)	23	(0)
2026-	→ Elbasani (loan)	7	(0)

International career^{‡}
2017–2018	Albania U16	5	(0)
2017–2018	Albania U17	7	(1)
2019	Albania U19	2	(0)
2022	Albania U20	1	(0)
2021–	Albania U21	5	(0)
- * Club domestic league appearances and goals as of 6 March 2026 ‡ National team caps and goals as of 5 September

Elmando Gjini (born 28 August 2002) is an Albanian professional footballer who plays as a centre-back for Albanian side AF Elbasani, on loan from Kosovo Superleague club Ballkani.
