= Jóhann Birnir Guðmundsson =

Icelandic footballer

Personal information
- Full name: Jóhann Birnir Guðmundsson
- Date of birth: 5 December 1977 (age 48)
- Place of birth: Reykjavík, Iceland
- Height: 1.81 m (5 ft 11 in)
- Position: Midfielder

Youth career
- Víðir

Senior career*
Years	Team	Apps	(Gls)
1994–1998	Keflavík	51	(13)
1998–2000	Watford	22	(2)
2000	→ Cambridge United (loan)	3	(0)
2001–2003	Lyn Oslo	63	(9)
2005–2005	Örgryte	37	(1)
2006–2008	GAIS	44	(3)
2008–2017	Keflavík	140	(31)

International career
1994	Iceland U17	2	(0)
1995–1996	Iceland U19	10	(1)
1997–1999	Iceland U21	11	(4)
1997–2004	Iceland	8	(0)
- * Club domestic league appearances and goals

Jóhann Birnir Guðmundsson (born 5 December 1977) is a retired Icelandic footballer, who last played as a midfielder for Icelandic club Keflavík.

Jóhann previously played for Watford in the Football League First Division. He scored two goals for Watford, both of which came in the same game against Port Vale.

His son Davíð Jóhannsson also became a footballer.
