= Ilija Babić =

Serbian association football player

Ilija Babić Илија Бабић
Personal information
- Date of birth: 3 August 2002 (age 24)
- Place of birth: Novi Sad, FR Yugoslavia
- Height: 1.85 m (6 ft 1 in)
- Position: Forward

Team information
- Current team: Radnički 1923
- Number: 11

Youth career
- Šajkaš Kovilj
- 2015–2017: Vojvodina
- 2017–2020: Red Star Belgrade

Senior career*
Years	Team	Apps	(Gls)
2020–2023	Red Star Belgrade	0	(0)
2020–2022	→ Grafičar Beograd (loan)	54	(8)
2022–2023	→ Mladost Novi Sad (loan)	28	(0)
2023	→ Voždovac (loan)	1	(0)
2023–2026	Spartak Subotica	85	(5)
2026–	Radnički 1923	0	(0)

International career^{‡}
2018–2019	Serbia U17	6	(1)
- * Club domestic league appearances and goals as of 13 June 2026 ‡ National team caps and goals as of 10 March 2021

Ilija Babić (Serbian Cyrillic: Илија Бабић, born 3 August 2002) is a Serbian footballer who plays as a forward for Radnički 1923.

== Honours ==
Individual

- Serbian SuperLiga Player of the Week: 2024–25 (Round 26)
