= Karl Landsten =

Swedish footballer (born 2002)

Personal information
- Full name: Karl Oskar Edor Landsten
- Date of birth: 12 July 2002 (age 24)
- Place of birth: Gothenburg, Sweden
- Height: 1.82 m (6 ft 0 in)
- Position: Forward

Team information
- Current team: Utsikten
- Number: 77

Youth career
- –2021: Häcken

Senior career*
Years	Team	Apps	(Gls)
2022	Nacional B		
2023–	Utsikten	14	(1)

International career^{‡}
2018–2019	Sweden U17	8	(4)
- * Club domestic league appearances and goals as of 4 March 2024 ‡ National team caps and goals as of 1 April 2019

Karl Oskar Edor Landsten (born 12 July 2002) is a Swedish footballer who plays as a winger or attacker for Utsikten. Besides Sweden, he has played in Uruguay.

== Early life ==
Landtsen was born in Gothenburg, Sweden, and joined the youth academy of Swedish side BK Häcken as a youth player.

== Club career ==
While playing for the youth academy of BK Häcken, he was regarded as a future prospect. However, in 2019, Landsten suffered an injury and returned to action twenty months later. After that, he joined the youth academy of Uruguayan side Nacional.

He joined the club after a trial. While playing for the club, he was nicknamed "Carlitos" and "El Sueco" (The Swede).

== International career ==
Landsten has represented Sweden internationally at youth level.
