= Gerson Sousa =

Portuguese footballer

Personal information
- Full name: Gerson Liliano Sanches Sousa
- Date of birth: 10 May 2002 (age 24)
- Place of birth: Lagos, Portugal
- Height: 1.78 m (5 ft 10 in)
- Position: Winger

Team information
- Current team: A.E. Kifisia
- Number: 10

Youth career
- 2010–2011: Odiáxere
- 2011: Portimão
- 2011–2014: Loulé
- 2014–2020: Benfica

Senior career*
Years	Team	Apps	(Gls)
2020–2025	Benfica B	88	(11)
2024–2025	Benfica	0	(0)
2025	→ Estrela da Amadora (loan)	6	(0)
2025–	A.E. Kifisia	37	(1)

International career^{‡}
2018–2019	Portugal U17	14	(8)
2019–2020	Portugal U18	7	(1)
2021–2022	Portugal U20	5	(1)
- * Club domestic league appearances and goals as of 1 November 2026 ‡ National team caps and goals as of 14 November 2023

Gerson Liliano Sanches Sousa (born 10 May 2002) is a Portuguese professional footballer who plays as a winger for Super League Greece club A.E. Kifisia.

== Career ==
On 29 May 2019, Sousa signed his first professional contract with Benfica B. Sousa made his professional debut with Benfica B in a 3-2 LigaPro win over Leixões S.C. on 1 November 2020.

On 19 October 2024, Sousa made his debut for Benfica's senior squad in a Taça de Portugal game against Pevidém.

== Honours ==
Benfica

- Under-20 Intercontinental Cup: 2022
