= Ronaldo Camará =

Bissau-Guinean footballer (born 2003)

Personal information
- Date of birth: 5 January 2003 (age 23)
- Place of birth: Bissau, Guinea Bissau
- Height: 1.72 m (5 ft 8 in)
- Position: Attacking midfielder

Team information
- Current team: FK Banga
- Number: 8

Youth career
- 2011–2012: Povoense
- 2012–2015: Sporting CP
- 2015–2022: Benfica
- 2022–2023: Monza
- 2025: Go Ahead Eagles

Senior career*
Years	Team	Apps	(Gls)
2020–2022	Benfica B	25	(2)
2023–2024	Feirense	7	(0)
2024	Beroe	10	(0)
2025–	Differdange	1	(0)
2026–	FK Banga	1	(0)

International career^{‡}
2016	Portugal U15	2	(1)
2016–2017	Portugal U16	8	(2)
2017–2019	Portugal U17	7	(2)
2023–	Guinea-Bissau	1	(0)
- * Club domestic league appearances and goals as of 9 March 2026 ‡ National team caps and goals as of 22:14, 11 September 2023 (UTC)

Ronaldo Camará (born 5 January 2003) is a Bissau-Guinean professional footballer who plays as an attacking midfielder for TOPLYGA club FK Banga. A former youth international for Portugal, he plays for the Guinea-Bissau national team.

== Professional career ==
On 10 January 2019, Camará signed his first professional contract with Benfica. He made his professional debut with Benfica B in a 2–0 LigaPro win over Cova da Piedade on 16 February 2020.

On 31 January 2022, Italian club Monza announced the signing of Camará for their under-19 squad.

On 31 January 2023, Camará returned to Portugal and signed with Feirense.

On 30 January 2024, Camará joined Bulgarian First Professional Football League club Beroe Stara Zagora.

== International career ==
Born in Guinea-Bissau, Camará is a youth international for Portugal. He was called up to the Guinea-Bissau national team for a set of 2023 Africa Cup of Nations qualification matches in September 2023.

== Honours ==
Benfica

- UEFA Youth League: 2021–22; runner-up: 2019–20
