= Rohat Ağca =

Dutch footballer (born 2001)

Personal information
- Full name: Rohat Ulaş Ağca
- Date of birth: 3 September 2001 (age 25)
- Place of birth: Almelo, Netherlands
- Height: 1.82 m (6 ft 0 in)
- Position: Midfielder

Team information
- Current team: Yeni Mersin İdmanyurdu
- Number: 8

Youth career
- 2012–2020: Twente

Senior career*
Years	Team	Apps	(Gls)
2020–2022	Heracles	4	(0)
2023–2024	SpVgg Vreden	15	(3)
2024–	Yeni Mersin İdmanyurdu	30	(1)
- * Club domestic league appearances and goals as of 11:07, 12 February 2025 (UTC)

Rohat Ulaş Ağca (born 3 September 2001) is a Dutch professional footballer who plays as a midfielder for Turkish TFF 2. Lig club Yeni Mersin İY.

== Career ==
A youth product of Twente's youth academy since the age of 11, Agca signed a professional contract with Heracles Almelo on 1 September 2020.
