= Eetu Rissanen =

Finnish footballer (born 2002)

Personal information
- Date of birth: 15 October 2002 (age 24)
- Height: 1.77 m (5 ft 10 in)
- Position: Forward

Senior career*
Years	Team	Apps	(Gls)
2017–2018	PK-37	21	(3)
2019–2021	KuPS	4	(0)
2019–2021	KuFu-98	45	(14)
2020	→ VPS (loan)	10	(3)
2021	→ KPV (loan)	15	(1)
2022-	PK-37	19	(30)

International career^{‡}
2018	Finland U16	3	(0)
2018–2019	Finland U17	14	(4)
2019	Finland U18	2	(0)
- * Club domestic league appearances and goals as of 8 April 2023 ‡ National team caps and goals as of 12:34, 8 December 2019 (UTC)

Eetu Rissanen (born 15 October 2002) is a Finnish footballer who plays as a forward.

== Career statistics ==
=== Club ===
As of 8 December 2019.

Club	Season	League			Cup		Continental		Other		Total	
Club	Season	Division	Apps	Goals	Apps	Goals	Apps	Goals	Apps	Goals	Apps	Goals
PK-37	2017	Kakkonen	2	0	0	0	0	0	0	0	2	0
PK-37	2018	Kakkonen	19	3	0	0	0	0	0	0	19	3
PK-37	Total		21	3	0	0	0	0	0	0	21	3
KuPS	2019	Veikkausliiga	4	0	1 (Note: Appearances in the Finnish Cup)	0	0	0	0	0	5	0
KuFu-98	2019	Kakkonen	17	6	0	0	0	0	0	0	17	6
Career total			42	9	1	0	0	0	0	0	43	9
