= Vladislav Kalinin =

Belarusian footballer

Personal information
- Date of birth: 14 January 2002 (age 24)
- Place of birth: Novalukoml, Vitebsk Oblast, Belarus
- Height: 1.84 m (6 ft 0 in)
- Position: Defender

Team information
- Current team: Dinamo Minsk
- Number: 26

Youth career
- 2018–2021: Dinamo Minsk

Senior career*
Years	Team	Apps	(Gls)
2021–	Dinamo Minsk	59	(0)

International career^{‡}
2018–2019	Belarus U17	5	(0)
2022–2023	Belarus U21	5	(0)
2025–	Belarus	1	(0)
- * Club domestic league appearances and goals as of 1 December 2025 ‡ National team caps and goals as of 8 September 2025

Vladislav Kalinin (Belarusian: Уладзіслаў Калінін; Russian: Владислав Калинин; born 14 January 2002) is a Belarusian professional footballer who plays as a defender for Dinamo Minsk and the Belarus national team.
