= Ferhat Çoğalan =

French-Turkish footballer (born 2002)

Personal information
- Date of birth: 29 June 2002 (age 24)
- Place of birth: Grande-Synthe, France
- Height: 1.69 m (5 ft 7 in)
- Position: Midfielder

Team information
- Current team: Boulogne B (on loan from Yeni Mersin İY)

Youth career
- 2006–2013: Olympique Grande-Synthe
- 2013–2018: Valencia
- 2018: Lille

Senior career*
Years	Team	Apps	(Gls)
2018–2021	Lille B	4	(0)
2022–2023	Pau B	14	(2)
2024–	Yeni Mersin İY	15	(0)
2026–	→ Boulogne B (loan)	0	(0)

International career
2016	Turkey U14	3	(0)
2016	Turkey U15	4	(3)
2017–2018	Turkey U16	10	(2)
2018–2019	Turkey U17	10	(1)
- * Club domestic league appearances and goals as of 3 February 2026

Ferhat Çoğalan (born 29 June 2002) is a professional footballer who plays as a midfielder for French club Boulogne B, on loan from Turkish 2. Lig club Yeni Mersin İY. Born in France, he is a former youth international for Turkey.

== Club career ==
Born in Grande-Synthe, France, Çoğalan's father, Sedat, was a footballer who played for Nancy in France, as well as Turanspor and Şanlıurfaspor in Turkey. Ferhat started playing football at the age of four, joining local side Olympique Grande-Synthe. At the age of eleven, he trialled with Spanish side Barcelona, but ultimately turned down their offer to sign him.

In August 2013, he moved to Spain to join the academy of Valencia, turning down numerous clubs across Europe in the process. He settled quickly in Valencia, picking up a man of the match award as his side won the LaLiga Promises Cup in late 2014. The following year he was linked with a move to Manchester United, with his father claiming that the English side had already held talks with the player.

He was offered a new contract with Valencia in 2018, but rejected the terms, instead opting to return to France to join Lille. His father later explained that they had decided to make the move after Valencia changed the infrastructure of their youth development projects, with Lille offering a clearer path to professional football. He signed a professional contract with Lille until June 2021.

However, three years after joining Lille, in which he only made four appearances for the club's B team, Çoğalan was released in July 2021. Following his departure from Lille, he trialled with Turkish side Beşiktaş in February 2022.

After a year with no club, Çoğalan joined Ligue 2 side Pau in 2022, going on to play for their B team in the Championnat National 3.

== International career ==
Ferhat Çoğalan has represented Turkey from under-14 to under-17 level.

== Career statistics ==
=== Club ===
As of 3 February 2026

Appearances and goals by club, season and competition
Club	Season	League			Cup (Note: Includes the Coupe de France and Turkish Cup)		Other		Total	
Club	Season	Division	Apps	Goals	Apps	Goals	Apps	Goals	Apps	Goals
Lille B	2018–19	Championnat National 2	3	0	–		0	0	3	0
Lille B	2019–20	Championnat National 2	1	0	–		0	0	1	0
Lille B	2020–21	Championnat National 3	0	0	–		0	0	0	0
Lille B	Total		4	0	0	0	0	0	4	0
Pau B	2022–23	Championnat National 3	14	2	–		0	0	14	2
Yeni Mersin İY	2024–25	TFF 2. Lig	14	0	1	0	0	0	15	0
Yeni Mersin İY	2025–26	TFF 2. Lig	1	0	1	0	0	0	2	0
Yeni Mersin İY	Total		15	0	2	0	0	0	17	0
Boulogne B (loan)	2025–26	Régional 1	0	0	–		0	0	0	0
Career total			33	2	2	0	0	0	35	2
