= Aleksandr Shestyuk =

Belarusian footballer

Personal information
- Date of birth: 5 June 2002 (age 24)
- Place of birth: Brest, Belarus
- Height: 1.86 m (6 ft 1 in)
- Position: Forward

Team information
- Current team: Radnički Niš
- Number: 9

Youth career
- 2017–2021: Dinamo Brest

Senior career*
Years	Team	Apps	(Gls)
2021	Dinamo Brest	29	(4)
2022	Nizhny Novgorod	0	(0)
2022	→ RFS (loan)	0	(0)
2022	→ RFS-2 (loan)	8	(8)
2022	Dinamo Brest	12	(4)
2023–2024	BATE Borisov	20	(1)
2024–2025	Isloch Minsk Raion	50	(28)
2026–	Radnički Niš	14	(8)

International career^{‡}
2019	Belarus U17	3	(2)
2021	Belarus U21	5	(2)
- * Club domestic league appearances and goals as of 13 June 2026 ‡ National team caps and goals as of 12 October 2021

Aleksandr Shestyuk (Belarusian: Аляксандр Шасцюк; Russian: Александр Шестюк; born 5 June 2002) is a Belarusian professional footballer who plays as a forward for Serbian club Radnički Niš.

== Club career ==
On 16 February 2022, Shestyuk was loaned to RFS in Latvia.

On 2 July 2022, Shestyuk returned to Dynamo Brest.
