= Yann Kembo =

French footballer

Personal information
- Full name: Yann Maël Kembo Diantela
- Date of birth: 20 March 2002 (age 24)
- Place of birth: Le Mans, France
- Height: 1.96 m (6 ft 5 in)
- Position: Centre-back

Team information
- Current team: Huesca (on loan from Sporting Gijón)

Youth career
- 2008–2014: AS Le Mans Villaret
- 2014–2017: Le Mans
- 2017–2019: Tours
- 2019–2021: Lens

Senior career*
| Years | Team | Apps | (Gls) |
| 2018–2019 | Tours II | 6 | (1) |
| 2019 | Tours | 1 | (0) |
| 2021–2023 | Lens II | 9 | (0) |
| 2023–2025 | Sporting B | 33 | (1) |
| 2024– | Sporting Gijón | 1 | (0) |
| 2026 | → Ibiza (loan) | 13 | (0) |
| 2026– | → Huesca (loan) | 0 | (0) |

International career
| 2018 | France U17 | 3 | (1) |
- * Club domestic league appearances and goals as of 10 June 2026

Yann Maël Kembo Diantela (born 20 March 2002) is a French professional footballer who plays as a centre-back for Spanish club SD Huesca, on loan from Sporting de Gijón.

== Club career ==
Born in Le Mans, Kembo played for local sides AS Le Mans Villaret and Le Mans FC before joining Tours FC in 2017. He made his first team debut with the latter on 18 May 2019, starting in a 2–2 home draw against SO Cholet which sealed the club's relegation to the Championnat National 2.

On 15 July 2019, Kembo signed a four-year contract with RC Lens and returned to youth football. He left the club in January 2023 after being rarely used for their reserves, and went on a trial at Sporting de Gijón shortly after; he then signed a contract with the club on 4 February, being assigned to the B-team.

Kembo made his first team debut with the Asturians on 30 October 2024, starting in a 1–0 away win over CD Numancia, for the season's Copa del Rey. He made his professional debut on 4 December, playing the full 90 minutes in a 1–0 away loss to Racing de Santander, also for the national cup.

On 28 June 2025, Kembor renewed his contract with Sporting until 2028, being promoted to the first team. The following 15 January, after just one league match, he was loaned to Primera Federación side UD Ibiza until June.

On 12 August 2026, Kembo moved to fellow third division side SD Huesca on a one-year loan deal.
