= Shalev Harush =

Israeli footballer (born 2002)

Shalev Harush שלו הרוש
Personal information
- Date of birth: 8 May 2002 (age 24)
- Place of birth: Ashdod, Israel
- Position: Midfielder

Team information
- Current team: F.C. Ashdod
- Number: 9

Youth career
- 2010–2021: F.C. Ashdod

Senior career*
Years	Team	Apps	(Gls)
2020–	F.C. Ashdod	103	(3)

International career^{‡}
2018	Israel U16	3	(0)
2019	Israel U17	18	(2)
2019	Israel U18	4	(2)
- * Club domestic league appearances and goals as of 24 June 2026 ‡ National team caps and goals as of 1 December 2023

Shalev Harush (Hebrew: שלו הרוש; born 8 May 2002) is an Israeli professional footballer who plays as a midfielder for Israeli Premier League club F.C. Ashdod.

== Early life ==
Harush was born and raised in Ashdod, Israel, to a Moroccan Jewish family.

== Career ==
On 25 December 2019, Harush made his senior debut with F.C. Ashdod in a 0–0 draw against Hapoel Tel Aviv. On 1 October 2022, he scored his debut career goal.
