= Vanja Panić =

Serbian football player

Personal information
- Date of birth: 27 January 2002 (age 24)
- Place of birth: Koper, Slovenia
- Height: 1.86 m (6 ft 1 in)
- Position: Forward

Team information
- Current team: SC Marchtrenk
- Number: 9

Youth career
- –2017: Koper
- 2017–2018: Domžale
- 2018–2020: Olimpija Ljubljana
- 2020: Red Star Belgrade

Senior career*
Years	Team	Apps	(Gls)
2020–2021	Red Star Belgrade	0	(0)
2020	→ Grafičar Beograd (loan)	3	(0)
2021	→ Mačva Šabac (loan)	10	(0)
2021–2022	Jadran Dekani	13	(1)
2022	Celje	0	(0)
2022	Bistrica	9	(0)
2023–	SC Marchtrenk	12	(2)

International career
2017	Slovenia U15	5	(0)
2018	Slovenia U16	5	(1)
2018–2019	Slovenia U17	12	(3)
2019	Slovenia U18	4	(0)
2020	Slovenia U19	1	(0)
- * Club domestic league appearances and goals as of 30 December 2023

Vanja Panić (born 27 January 2002) is a Slovenian footballer who plays as a forward for Austrian club SC Marchtrenk.
