= Manuel Polster =

Austrian footballer (born 2002)

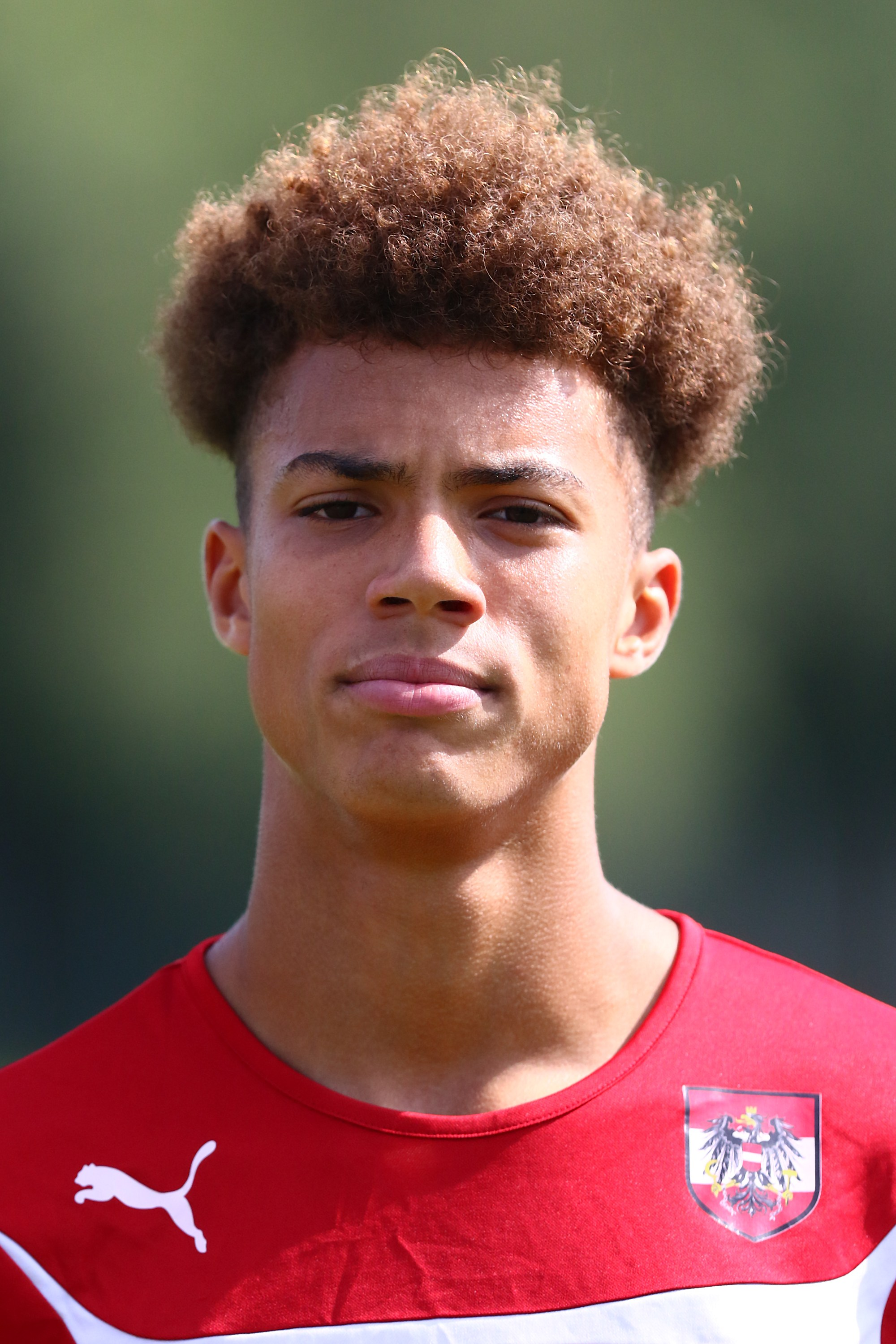
- Polster in 2018

Personal information
- Date of birth: 23 December 2002 (age 23)
- Place of birth: Vienna, Austria
- Height: 1.82 m (6 ft 0 in)
- Position: Winger

Team information
- Current team: ASK Voitsberg

Youth career
- 2008–2015: SV Langenzersdorf
- 2015–2019: AKA St. Pölten
- 2019–2021: VfL Wolfsburg

Senior career*
Years	Team	Apps	(Gls)
2021–2022	VfB Stuttgart II	34	(6)
2022–2024	Austria Wien II	5	(1)
2022–2024	Austria Wien	42	(1)
2024–2026	Lausanne-Sport	13	(0)
2025–2026	→ Stade Nyonnais (loan)	7	(0)
2026	TSV Havelse	7	(0)
2026–	ASK Voitsberg	0	(0)

International career^{‡}
2017	Austria U15	6	(0)
2017–2018	Austria U16	5	(3)
2018–2019	Austria U17	14	(1)
2019–2020	Austria U18	6	(0)
2022–2024	Austria U21	13	(1)
- * Club domestic league appearances and goals as of 1 July 2026 ‡ National team caps and goals as of 26 March 2024

Manuel Polster (born 23 December 2002) is an Austrian professional footballer who plays as a winger for ASK Voitsberg.

Although they share the same birthplace he is of no relation to Toni Polster.

== Club career ==
Polster is a youth product of the Austrian clubs SV Langenzersdorf and AKA St. Pölten, before moving to the youth academy of the German club VfL Wolfsburg in 2019. He moved to the Stuttgart reserves in the Regionalliga on 11 July 2022 and scored 6 goals in 34 matches.

On 27 June 2022, Polster transferred to Austria Wien, signing a three-year contract. He made his professional and Austrian Football Bundesliga with Austria Wien as a late substitute in a 3–0 win over Ried on 18 September 2021.

On 3 July 2024, Polster signed a three-season contract with Lausanne-Sport in Switzerland.

Polster's contract with Lausanne-Sport was terminated in January 2026. He subsequently joined German club TSV Havelse for the remainder of the season.

Polster returned to Austria ahead of the 2026–27 season, joining ASK Voitsberg.

== International career ==
Polster is a youth international for Austria, having played with them up to the Austria U18 level.
