= Yeni Mersin İdmanyurdu =

- Full name: Yeni Mersin İdmanyurdu Futbol A.Ş.
- Founded: 1964 (as İçelspor); 2019 (as İçel İdmanyurdu); 2022 (as Yeni Mersin İdmanyurdu)
- Ground: Mersin Stadium
- Capacity: 25,497
- President: Metin Saltık
- Manager: Ergün Penbe
- League: TFF 3. Lig
- 2025–26: TFF 2. Lig, Red, 16th of 18 (relegated)
- Website: https://yenimersinidmanyurdu.org.tr/
Home colours	Away colours	Third colours

Yeni Mersin İdmanyurdu is a Turkish sports club located in Mersin. The football team currently plays in the TFF Third League.

== Current squad ==
As of 8 December 2025

Note: Flags indicate national team as defined under FIFA eligibility rules; some limited exceptions apply. Players may hold more than one non-FIFA nationality.

No.	Pos.	Nation	Player
1	GK	TUR	Nurullah Aslan
2	DF	TUR	Fatih Efe Yüksel
3	FW	TUR	Alim Toprak Arıca
4	DF	TUR	Salih Yavaş
5	MF	TUR	Yasin Yaşar
6	MF	TUR	Yusuf Zahit Kahveci
7	FW	TUR	Furkan Güneş
8	MF	NED	Rohat Ağca
9	FW	TUR	Yusuf Uzabacı
10	FW	TUR	Mehmet Gündüz
11	FW	TUR	Mehmetcan Yapal
13	DF	TUR	Emir Miray Köksal
14	FW	TUR	Efe Ataman
15	DF	TUR	Koray Baykara
16	DF	TUR	Beritan Sakar
17	DF	TUR	Fırat Aras
19	MF	TUR	Abdullah Enes Ersin
20	MF	TUR	Ümitcan Ekşi
21	MF	TUR	Ferhat Çoğalan
23	FW	TUR	Yusuf Ensar Poyrazlı
24	MF	TUR	Aliilkebir Korkut
27	MF	TUR	Muhammed Berat Demir
28	DF	TUR	Yusuf Arslan
32	MF	TUR	Arda Gezer

No.	Pos.	Nation	Player
33	GK	TUR	Yavuz Buğra Boyar
42	DF	TUR	Kayra Mert Ak
45	GK	TUR	Murat Demir
51	MF	TUR	Serhat Akın Özdemir
53	MF	TUR	Ahmet Mumin Papaker
54	DF	TUR	Alper Kadir Duruk
55	FW	AUT	Christopher Kröhn
58	DF	TUR	Mehmet Demirözü
61	DF	TUR	Muhammet Ali Güney
65	GK	TUR	Çınar Tuna Benzer
73	FW	TUR	Utkan Çevik
76	MF	TUR	Enes Çenşi
77	DF	TUR	Aslan Gök
88	FW	TUR	Umut Aydın
97	MF	TUR	Sergen Yatağan
98	FW	TUR	Semih Emir Erdoğan
99	FW	TUR	Berk Can Yıldızlı (on loan from Kasımpaşa)
—	GK	TUR	Barış Kababıyık
—	DF	TUR	Hüseyin Eren Çivi
—	DF	TUR	Alihan Kubalas
—	MF	TUR	Deniz Dündar
—	MF	TUR	Emrullah Eren Kozan
—	FW	TUR	Efe Erce Akgün
—	FW	TUR	Atilla Aksoy
