= Ivan Nikolov (footballer) =

Macedonian footballer

Personal information
- Full name: Ivan Nikolov; Иван Николов
- Date of birth: 17 February 2002 (age 24)
- Place of birth: Štip, Macedonia
- Height: 1.80 m (5 ft 11 in)
- Position: Midfielder

Youth career
- 2014–2017: Bregalnica
- 2017–2019: Akademija Pandev

Senior career*
Years	Team	Apps	(Gls)
2019–2021	Akademija Pandev	26	(0)
2021–2022	Vardar	22	(2)
2022–2023	Bregalnica	28	(5)
2023–2026	Sønderjyske	36	(3)
2025	→ Vendsyssel (loan)	13	(0)
2026	Radnik Bijeljina	13	(0)

International career^{‡}
2018	North Macedonia U17	3	(1)
2018–2019	North Macedonia U18	6	(0)
2019–2020	North Macedonia U19	10	(0)
2022–2024	North Macedonia U21	23	(1)
2022–	North Macedonia	1	(0)
- * Club domestic league appearances and goals as of 12 June 2026 ‡ National team caps and goals as of 15 October 2024

Ivan Nikolov (Macedonian: Иван Николов; born 17 February 2002) is a Macedonian professional footballer who plays as a midfielder.

== Career ==
=== Club career ===
Nikolov made his senior football debut on 31 August 2019 at the age of 17, by playing the full match for Akademija Pandev against Rabotnichki in the fourth round of the 2019–20 Macedonian First Football League season. That season he went on to play 7 games, throughout which he also assisted one goal.

On 17 July 2023, Nikolov joined Danish 1st Division club SønderjyskE on a deal until June 2026. On 4 February 2025 Sønderjyske confirmed that Nikolov moved to Danish 1st Division club Vendsyssel FF on a loan deal for the rest of the season. He returned to Sønderjyske after the loan spell.

With zero minutes of playing time throughout the first half of the 2025–26 season at Sønderjyske, the club confirmed on 4 January 2026 that the parties had agreed to terminate the contract by mutual consent.

=== International ===
Ever since 2018 Nikolov has been regular at most of North Macedonia's national youth teams.

He made his debut for North Macedonia national football team on 22 October 2022 in a friendly match against Saudi Arabia.
