= Yannick Cotter =

Swiss footballer (born 2002)

Personal information
- Date of birth: 3 January 2002 (age 24)
- Place of birth: Sion, Switzerland
- Height: 1.76 m (5 ft 9 in)
- Position: Left winger

Team information
- Current team: Martigny-Sports
- Number: 11

Youth career
- –2019: Sion
- 2020–2021: Juventus

Senior career*
Years	Team	Apps	(Gls)
2019–2020	Sion	2	(0)
2020–2023	Juventus Next Gen	0	(0)
2020	→ Sion (loan)	0	(0)
2023–2024	Yverdon-Sport	0	(0)
2023–2024	Yverdon-Sport II	8	(1)
2024–2025	Paradiso	9	(0)
2025–2026	Schwarz-Weiß Bregenz	9	(0)
2026–	Martigny-Sports	2	(0)

International career
2016–2017	Switzerland U15	7	(5)
2017–2018	Switzerland U16	8	(1)
2018–2019	Switzerland U17	10	(1)
2019	Switzerland U19	2	(0)
- * Club domestic league appearances and goals as of 23:46, 13 March 2026 (UTC)

Yannick Cotter (born 3 January 2002) is a Swiss professional footballer who plays as a left winger for 1. Liga Classic side Martigny-Sports.

== Club career ==
=== Sion ===
Cotter is a product of Sion. In the 2018–19 season, Cotter scored 11 goals in 26 for the under-18s. Aged 17, Cotter played with the Sion U21 in the Swiss Promotion League. In the beginning of December 2019, 17-year old Cotter began training with the first team.

He made his official and professional debut on 8 December 2019, against Basel in the Swiss Super League; Cotter started on the bench, and replaced Seydou Doumbia in the 59th minute. He also came on from the bench in the following league game against Neuchâtel Xamax.

=== Juventus ===
In the beginning of January 2020, Cotter was officially sold to Italian side Juventus. Cotter reportedly signed a deal until June 2024, and was sold for a fee of around €4,9 million. He remained at Sion on loan for the rest of the season. However, due to the suspension of football in Switzerland during the COVID-19 pandemic, he made no official appearances for the club in his loan spell.

Having returned to Juventus in July 2020, Cotter was registered to the club's under-19 team for the 2020–21 season. He played 171 minutes, spread over 12 league games, and scored two goals in the Campionato Primavera 1. During a training session in June 2021, Cotter suffered an anterior cruciate ligament injury, which kept him out for about eight months. He returned to train with Juventus U23 – the reserve team of Juventus – in April 2022.

=== Yverdon-Sport ===
On 22 August 2023, Cotter signed a two-year contract with Yverdon-Sport.

Before his departure a year later, Cotter only managed to play 8 games for the club's reserve team and no games for the first team.

=== FC Paradiso ===
In August 2024, it was confirmed that Cotter switched to the Swiss Promotion League side FC Paradiso.

=== Schwarz-Weiß Bregenz ===
Ahead of the 2025-26 season, Cotter joined Austrian 2. Liga side Schwarz-Weiß Bregenz.
