= Uroš Blagojević =

Serbian association football player

Personal information
- Date of birth: 21 March 2002 (age 24)
- Height: 1.93 m (6 ft 4 in)
- Position: Left back

Youth career
- –2019: Zemun
- 2019–2020: Red Star Belgrade

Senior career*
Years	Team	Apps	(Gls)
2020–2021	Red Star Belgrade	0	(0)
2020–2021	→ Grafičar Beograd (loan)	10	(1)
2021–2021	→ Novi Pazar (loan)	5	(1)
2021–2022	Radnički 1923	13	(1)
2022-2023	Rad	9	(0)
2023	Jedinstvo Bijelo Polje	2	(0)

International career^{‡}
2018–2019	Serbia U17	5	(1)
2019	Serbia U19	2	(0)
- * Club domestic league appearances and goals as of 31 July 2023 ‡ National team caps and goals as of 21 February 2021

Uroš Blagojević (Serbian Cyrillic: Урош Благојевић, born 21 March 2002) is a Serbian footballer who plays as a left-back.

== Career statistics ==
=== Club ===
As of 21 February 2021.

Club	Season	League			Cup		Continental		Other		Total	
Club	Season	Division	Apps	Goals	Apps	Goals	Apps	Goals	Apps	Goals	Apps	Goals
Red Star Belgrade	2020–21	Serbian SuperLiga	0	0	0	0	0	0	0	0	0	0
Grafičar Beograd (loan)	2020–21	Serbian First League	10	1	0	0	–		0	0	10	1
Novi Pazar (loan)	2020–21	Serbian SuperLiga	0	0	0	0	–		0	0	0	0
Career total			10	1	0	0	0	0	0	0	10	1
