= Davíð Jóhannsson =

Icelandic footballer (born 2002)

Personal information
- Full name: Davíð Snær Jóhannsson
- Date of birth: 15 June 2002 (age 24)
- Place of birth: Oslo, Norway
- Height: 1.76 m (5 ft 9 in)
- Positions: Midfielder; attacking midfielder

Team information
- Current team: Aalesund
- Number: 11

Youth career
- Keflavík
- 2022: Lecce

Senior career*
| Years | Team | Apps | (Gls) |
| 2018–2021 | Keflavík | 57 | (7) |
| 2022 | Lecce | 0 | (0) |
| 2022–2023 | FH | 44 | (8) |
| 2024– | Aalesund | 64 | (8) |

International career^{‡}
| 2017–2019 | Iceland U17 | 11 | (1) |
| 2018–2019 | Iceland U18 | 21 | (2) |
| 2019 | Iceland U19 | 7 | (0) |
| 2022–2024 | Iceland U21 | 9 | (2) |
- * Club domestic league appearances and goals as of 23 July 2026 ‡ National team caps and goals as of 25 March 2026

Davíð Snær Jóhannsson (born 15 June 2002) is a footballer who plays as a midfielder for Aalesund. Born in Norway he represents Iceland at youth level.

== Club career ==
Starting his career in Keflavík, he made his Úrvalsdeild debut in June 2018 against KR, still aged 15.

In 2020 he was on trial with Vålerenga in Norway. After the 2021 season in Iceland, Davíð signed for Lecce in Italy. He scored on his debut for the primavera team. However, already in May 2022 he returned to Iceland, signing for FH.

After the 2023 season, he went back to Norway and signed a contract with Aalesund until 2028. Aalesund escaped relegation from the 2024 1. divisjon and won promotion to the 2026 Eliteserien via playoff. The team also reached the semi-final of the 2025–26 cup.

== International career ==
Jóhannsson was eligible to represent the Norway national team and the Iceland national team.

He also received 48 youth international caps from Iceland U17 through Iceland U21. He took part in the 2019 UEFA European Under-17 Championship.

== Personal life ==
Born in Oslo, Norway, Davíð is a son of former Watford player Jóhann Birnir Guðmundsson who played for Lyn in Oslo at the time.
