= Antonín Svoboda (footballer) =

Czech footballer

Personal information
- Date of birth: 14 March 2002 (age 24)
- Place of birth: Brno, Czech Republic
- Height: 1.88 m (6 ft 2 in)
- Position: Forward

Team information
- Current team: SV Gloggnitz
- Number: 14

Youth career
- –2018: FC Zbrojovka Brno
- 2018–2020: Red Bull Salzburg

Senior career*
| Years | Team | Apps | (Gls) |
| 2020–2021 | FC Liefering | 22 | (1) |
| 2021–2023 | MFK Karviná | 25 | (1) |
| 2022–2023 | → FC Vlašim (loan) | 23 | (5) |
| 2023 | SK Líšeň | 1 | (0) |
| 2024 | MFK Vyškov | 14 | (0) |
| 2024 | ASV Siegendorf | 15 | (7) |
| 2025 | SV Leobendorf | 8 | (2) |
| 2025– | SV Gloggnitz | 31 | (14) |

International career^{‡}
| 2017 | Czech Republic U15 | 7 | (1) |
| 2017–2018 | Czech Republic U16 | 12 | (3) |
| 2018–2019 | Czech Republic U17 | 9 | (6) |
| 2019–2020 | Czech Republic U19 | 9 | (1) |
| 2021–2022 | Czech Republic U20 | 1 | (0) |
- * Club domestic league appearances and goals as of 28 June 2026 ‡ National team caps and goals as of 2 September 2021

Antonín Svoboda (born 14 March 2002) is a Czech professional footballer who plays as a forward for Austrian Regionalliga East club SV Gloggnitz.

== Club career ==
=== Early career ===
He started his career with FC Zbrojovka Brno. On 22 August 2018 he joined the Red Bull Football Academy in Salzburg. He war also part of the UEFA Youth League team 2019–20. At the beginning of the 2020–21 season he was transferred to FC Liefering.

Svoboda made his debut for Austrian Second League side FC Liefering in September 2020 against FC Wacker Innsbruck. He came in 69th minute for Chukwubuike Adamu.

He made his debut for the senior team of Red Bull Salzburg on 25 February 2021 in a Europa League Round of 32 game against Villarreal, as an added time substitute.

=== Return to the Czech Republic ===
In the 2021–22 season Svoboda played in the Czech First League for MFK Karviná, for whom he made 25 league appearances. He then joined FC Vlašim on loan in the second league, for the 2022–23 season.

In August 2023, Svoboda joined SK Líšeň, also of the second league. His first appearance was as an injury time substitute in a league game versus Kroměříž. He made no further league appearances and played the first half of a second round match in the Czech Cup before agreeing to terminate his contract with Líšeň; Svoboda subsequently signed for second league side MFK Vyškov in January 2024.

== Honours ==
FC Liefering

Runner-up

- Austrian Football First League: 2021
