= Jurica Jurčec =

Croatian association footballer

Personal information
- Date of birth: 4 April 2002 (age 24)
- Place of birth: Zabok, Croatia
- Height: 1.76 m (5 ft 9 in)
- Position: Winger

Youth career
- Tondach
- 2010–2020: Dinamo Zagreb

Senior career*
Years	Team	Apps	(Gls)
2020–2021	Dinamo Zagreb II	0	(0)
2021–2022	Krško	29	(0)
2022–2023	Jarun Zagreb	13	(1)
2023	Rheindorf Altach II	2	(1)
2023	Rheindorf Altach	4	(0)
2023–2025	Crotone	5	(0)
2024–2025	→ Sesvete (loan)	19	(0)

International career^{‡}
2017	Croatia U15	2	(0)
2018	Croatia U16	2	(1)
2018–2019	Croatia U17	9	(1)
- * Club domestic league appearances and goals as of 1 June 2025 ‡ National team caps and goals as of 27 March 2019

Jurica Jurčec (born 4 April 2002) is a Croatian professional footballer who plays as a winger.

== Career ==
Jurčec is a youth product of Tondach and Dinamo Zagreb. He moved to the Slovenian side Krško in 2021. After a season there, he returned to Croatia with Jarun Zagreb in the First Football League. On 2 February 2023, he transferred to the Austrian club Rheindorf Altach. He made his professional debut with Rheindorf Altach in a 1–0 Austrian Football Bundesliga loss to LASK on 12 February 2023.

On 1 September 2023, Jurčec signed a three-year contract with Crotone in Italy. His contract with Crotone was terminated by mutual consent on 1 August 2025.

== International career ==
Jurčec is a youth international for Croatia, having played up to the Croatia U17s.
