= Albanians in Austria =

Total population
- 40,000-80,000 (2016)

Regions with significant populations
- Vienna · Salzburg · Innsbruck · Graz · Linz

Languages
- Albanian; German

Religion
- Islam; Christianity; Irreligion

Related ethnic groups
- Albanians in Germany and Switzerland

The Albanians in Austria (German: Albaner in Österreich; Albanian: Shqiptarët në Austri) refers to the Albanian migrants in Austria and their descendants. They mostly trace their origins to Kosovo, North Macedonia and to a lesser extent to Albania and other Albanian-speaking territories in the Balkan Peninsula.

== Background ==
The Republic of Austria officially recognized Albania as a sovereign and independent state on 18 February 1922. In April 1921, a passport office was established in Vienna by Gjergj Pekmezi, who later became Albania's first consul representative to Austria.

Following the end of World War II, diplomatic relations between the two countries were re-established on 20 December 1955. Diplomatic representatives were exchanged the following year, with Walter Wodak presenting his credentials on behalf of the Austrian government on 13 June 1956, followed by Koço Prifti, who presented his credentials as Albania's representative on 10 October 1956.

== History ==
The first Albanian in Austria is Luka Summa, an Albanian from Shkodër associated with the Bogdani publication, who arrived in Vienna in August of 1685.

Austria has been a destination for migrants since the end of World War II. The country hosted refugees from Hungary in 1956, Czechoslovakia in 1968–1969, and Poland in the early 1980s. Labor migration from the former Yugoslavia began in the early 1960s, facilitated by a bilateral agreement signed in 1966. Many of these workers had limited vocational training and lower educational levels.

The breakup of Yugoslavia in the 1990s led to a significant influx of refugees, including approximately 13,000 from Croatia and 90,000 from Bosnia and Herzegovina. During the Kosovo War of 1998–1999, around 13,000 citizens arrived in Austria as refugees. Two major waves of migration from Albania occurred in 1990 and during the civil unrest of 1997–98.

== Demography ==
According to Statistics Austria, 40,000-80,000 Albanians lived in Austria as of 2016. 2012 estimates ranged from 35,000 to 80,000 individuals, with specific breakdowns suggesting 30,000 to 60,000 from Kosovo, 2,800 to 4,000 from Albania, and approximately 2,000 from North Macedonia. The largest concentration of Albanians is in Vienna (37.7%), with notable communities also in Graz and Linz. A 2012 report by the MA 17 department of the City of Vienna estimated the population at 80,000, with 35,000 residing in Vienna alone.

In 2016, 54.3% of the Albanian population in Austria were male (60,327 individuals) and 45.7% were female (50,699). The community is relatively young, with 75.7% under the age of 41. The age distribution was as follows: 0–11 years (22.8%), 12–18 years (12.4%), 19–30 years (22.2%), 31–40 years (18.2%), 41–55 years (16.4%), and over 56 years (7.9%).

As of 2016, unemployment among Albanians in Austria stood at 7.3%. Approximately 40% were formally employed, 23.6% were not registered as employees, and 28.6% were under the age of 15. Less than 1% were engaged in military or civilian service.

The distribution of Albanians with citizenship from Albania and Kosovo in Austria as of 1 January 2019:

State Bundesland	(Albania) Albanian nationals 2018	(Kosovo) Kosovan nationals 2018
Burgenland	40	381
Kärnten	98	850
Niederösterreich	347	4,002
Oberösterreich	350	6,785
Salzburg	107	1,998
Steiermark	376	3,635
Tirol	89	606
Vorarlberg	38	512
Wien	1,307	6,780
Austria	2,752	25,549

The distribution of Albanians born in the countries of Albania and Kosovo living in Austria as of 1 January 2019:

State Bundesland	(Albania) Albanian nationals 2018	(Kosovo) Kosovan nationals 2018
Burgenland	81	616
Kärnten	197	1,272
Niederösterreich	641	5,901
Oberösterreich	506	8,150
Salzburg	190	2,026
Steiermark	650	4,193
Tirol	153	707
Vorarlberg	79	697
Wien	1,911	9,142
Austria	4,390	32,704

== Notable people ==
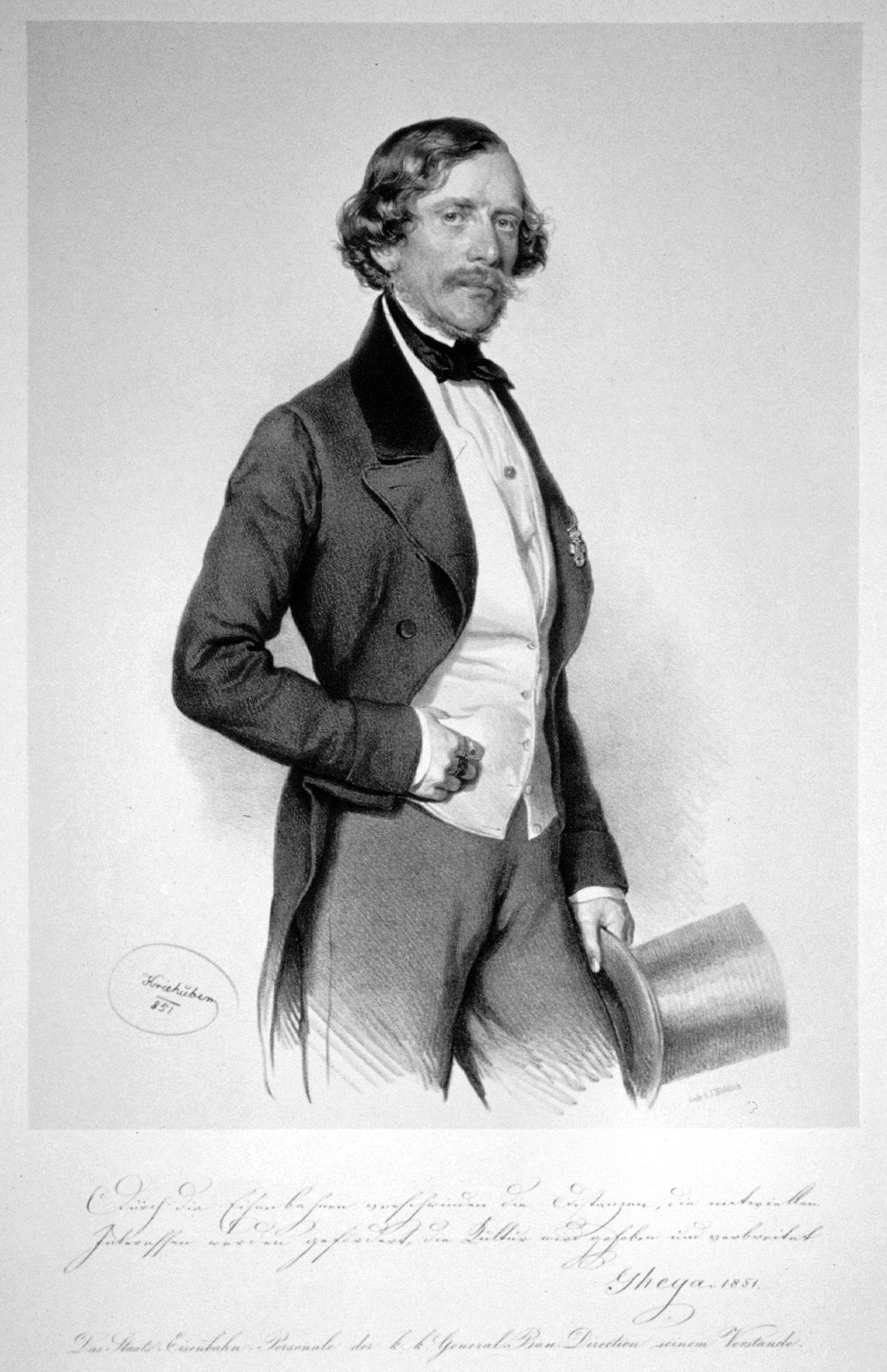
Karl Ritter von Ghega designed the first mountain railway in Europe built with a standard gauge track.

=== Science ===
- Alessandro Goracuchi – Albanian scientist, doctor and diplomat

=== Military ===
- Giorgio Basta – Italian general, diplomat, and writer of Arbëreshë origin, employed by the Holy Roman Emperor Rudolf II to command Habsburg forces in the Long War of 1591–1606

=== Science and engineering ===
- Karl Ritter von Ghega – Albanian-Austrian nobleman and the designer of the Semmering Railway from Gloggnitz to Mürzzuschlag

=== Cinema ===
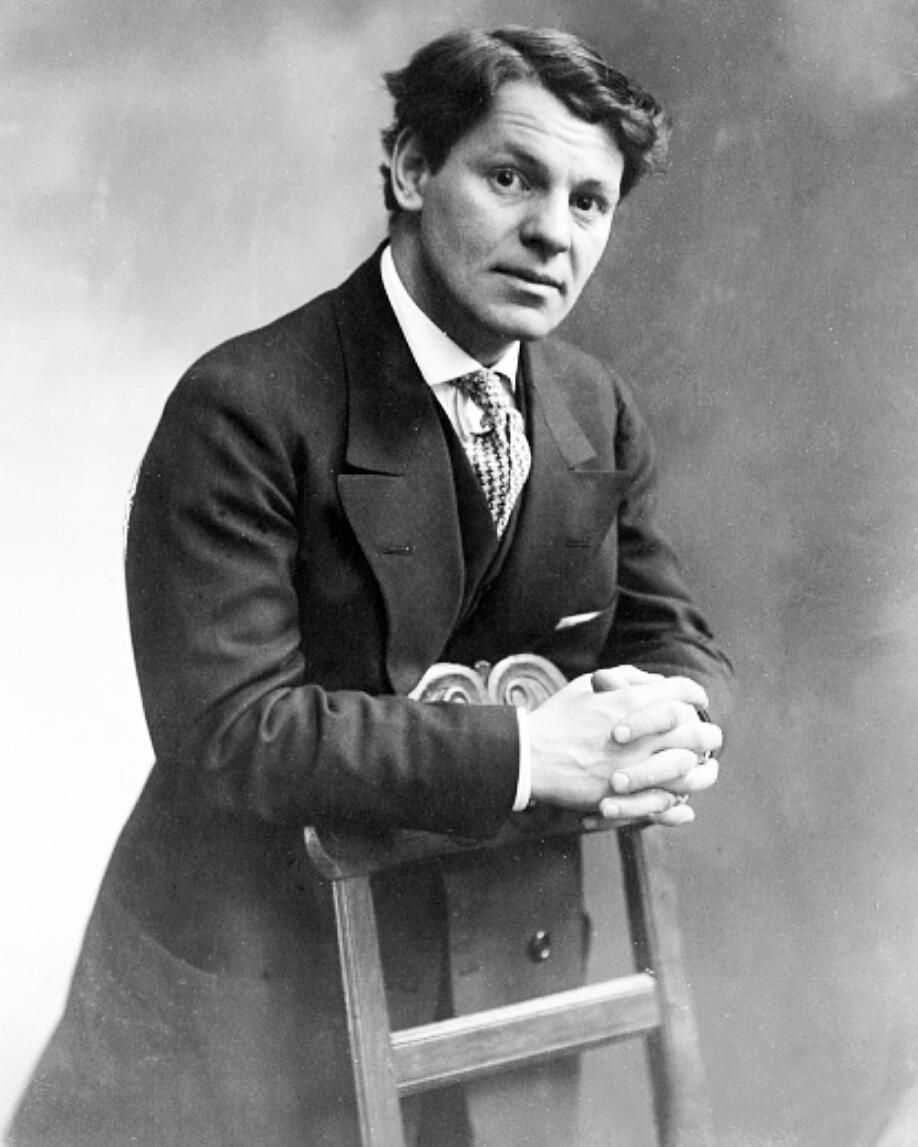
Aleksandër Moisiu was an early 20th century actor of European stage.

- Aleksandër Moisiu – Austrian stage actor

=== Sports ===
- Eldis Bajrami – Footballer
- Sinan Bytyqi – retired Kosovo Albanian professional footballer
- Ronald Gërçaliu – Albanian-born Austrian footballer
- Mehdi Hetemaj – Austrian-Kosovan footballer
- Besian Idrizaj – was an Austrian professional footballer who last played as a striker for Swansea City
- Dukagjin Karanezi – Austrian–Albanian professional footballer
- Floralba Krasniqi – Albanian football midfielder
- Atdhe Nuhiu – Austrian–Albanian professional footballer
- Lumbardh Salihu – professional footballer
- Benjamin Sulimani – Austrian footballer
- Emin Sulimani – Austrian football midfielder
- Albert Vallci – Austrian footballer
- Vesel Demaku – Austrian-Albanian footballer
- Albin Gashi – Austrian-Albanian footballer
- Ylli Sallahi – Austrian footballer
- Adrian Hajdari – footballer
- Esad Bejic – footballer
- Dijon Kameri – footballer
- Enis Murati – Albanian-Austrian basketball player

== See also ==
- Albania–Austria relations
- Immigration to Austria
- Albanian diaspora
- Albanians in Germany
- Albanians in Switzerland
