= Stellwagen =

Stellwagen is a German occupational surname, which means "cart-maker" or "cartwright", from the Middle High German stelle ("cart") and wagen ("wagon"). The name may refer to:

- Daniël Stellwagen (born 1987), Dutch chess player
- Friederich Stellwagen (1603–1660), German organ builder
- Luca Stellwagen (born 1998), German footballer
