= Albanians in Germany =

Ethnic group in Germany

Total population
- Germany 320.000

Languages
- Albanian; German

Religion
- Islam; Irreligion; Christianity

Related ethnic groups
- Albanians in Austria and Switzerland
- ^{a} The number includes nationals from Albania and Kosovo.

The Albanians in Germany (German: Albaner in Deutschland; Albanian: Shqiptarët në Gjermani) refers to the Albanian migrants in Germany and their descendants. They mostly trace their origins to Albania, Kosovo and to a lesser extent to North Macedonia and other Albanian-speaking territories in the Balkan Peninsula. Their exact number is difficult to determine as some ethnic Albanians hold German, Macedonian, Serbian or another Former Yugoslavian citizenship.

There are approximately 320.000 Albanians distributed in the territory of Germany composed of 242,855 Kosovar nationals and 73,905 Albanian nationals. This makes them one of the largest immigrant groups in the country and the third largest non-EU foreign national group after Turkish and Syrian nationals. They are predominantly concentrated in the states of Baden-Württemberg, Bayern, Hessen, Nordrhein-Westfalen and Niedersachsen. Berlin, Hamburg, München and Stuttgart represent the metropolitan areas with the most significant Albanian population in the country.

Germany maintains close ties with Albania and Kosovo which are characterised by a spirit of economic and political partnership. Relations with Albania have become more significant after the collapse of communism in 1991 as the country paved the way of a democratisation process. Germany was also one of the first countries to officially recognise and establish diplomatic relations with Kosovo after it declared its independence in 2008.

== History ==
The first mention of Albanians being present in Germany was during the wars of Austrian Succession fighting as stratioti mercenaries for Empress Maria Teresa.

In the modern era, Albanian migrants came to Germany as gastarbeiter in the middle of the 20th century. They came to the country as Yugoslavian migrant workers from the recruitment state of Yugoslavia. They were usually regarded as Yugoslavs and not as Albanians because they came from Kosovo and North Macedonia which at that time were part of Yugoslavia. Nevertheless, more and more Albanians arrived in the country since the beginning of the 1980s.

In 1990, more than 3,000 Albanian nationals fled the communist regime of Albania in the German Embassy Tirana and were later allowed to travel on via Italy to Germany as embassy refugees.

During the Kosovo war in 1999, many Kosovo Albanians sought asylum in the Federal Republic of Germany. By the end of 1999, the number of Kosovo Albanians in Germany was about 480,000, about 100,000 had returned voluntarily after the war in their homeland or been forcibly removed.

In the Kosovo war in 1999, relatively many Kosovo Albanians came to Germany fled from Serbian aggression. In Berlin, about 23,000 Albanians lived in 1999. In 2015, there was another wave of Albanian immigration when tens of thousands of people from the Western Balkans traveled to Germany and applied for asylum. In the first six months of this year, 31,400 people from Kosovo and 22,209 people from Albania sought asylum in Germany, although there was little chance of success. By the end of the year, the numbers increased to 54,762 people from Albania and 37,095 people from Kosovo. In addition to the high unemployment and lack of perspective also targeted disinformation by tour operators and people smugglers is seen as the cause of mass immigration. The Federal Office for Migration and Refugees tried to prevent further Albanians from leaving for Germany by advertising and media campaigns. Many left Germany months later voluntarily, while others were deported and were banned from entering the Schengen area.

== Demography ==
Based on results of the German microcensus of 2020, there were approximately 316,760 Albanians distributed in the territory of Germany composed of 242,855 people with Kosovan nationality and 73,905 people holding Albanian nationality. The exact estimation of Albanians in the country could be higher but note that official data gives no indication of ethnic backgrounds.

In Berlin in 1999, there were about 25,000 Albanians, the number dropped because of remigration and Germany's general population decline. It is quite hard to know the true number of Albanians in Germany, as they were defined as Yugoslavs or Macedonians when they came to Germany. Germany is the most popular destination for Kosovar Albanians seeking to emigrate to Western Europe.

=== Statistics ===
The distribution of Albanian nationals in the Federal republic of Germany as of 2021.

The distribution of Kosovan nationals in the Federal republic of Germany as of 2021.

The states with the most significant concentration of Albanians are Baden-Württemberg, Bayern and Nordrhein-Westfalen mostly in western Germany. The most lesser number are to be found in Brandenburg, Mecklenburg-Vorpommern, Sachsen-Anhalt and Saarland. Berlin, Hamburg, München and Stuttgart represent the metropolitan areas with the most significant concentration of Albanians in Germany.

== Notable people ==
Selected people:

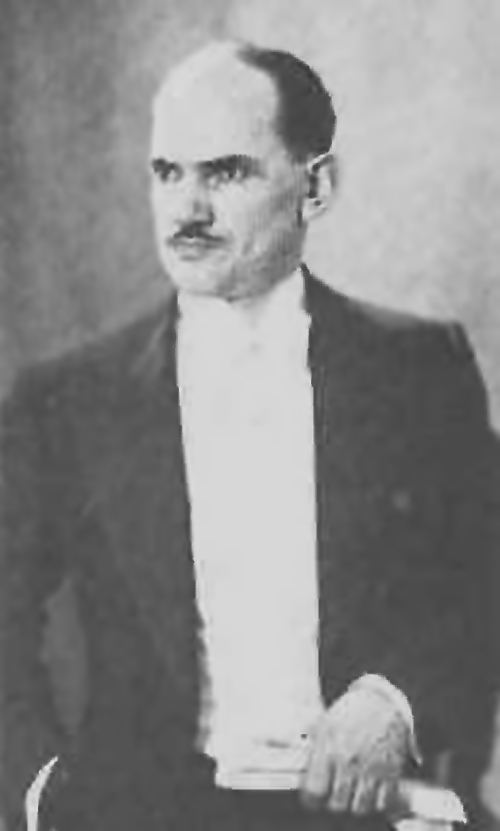
Elyesa Bazna

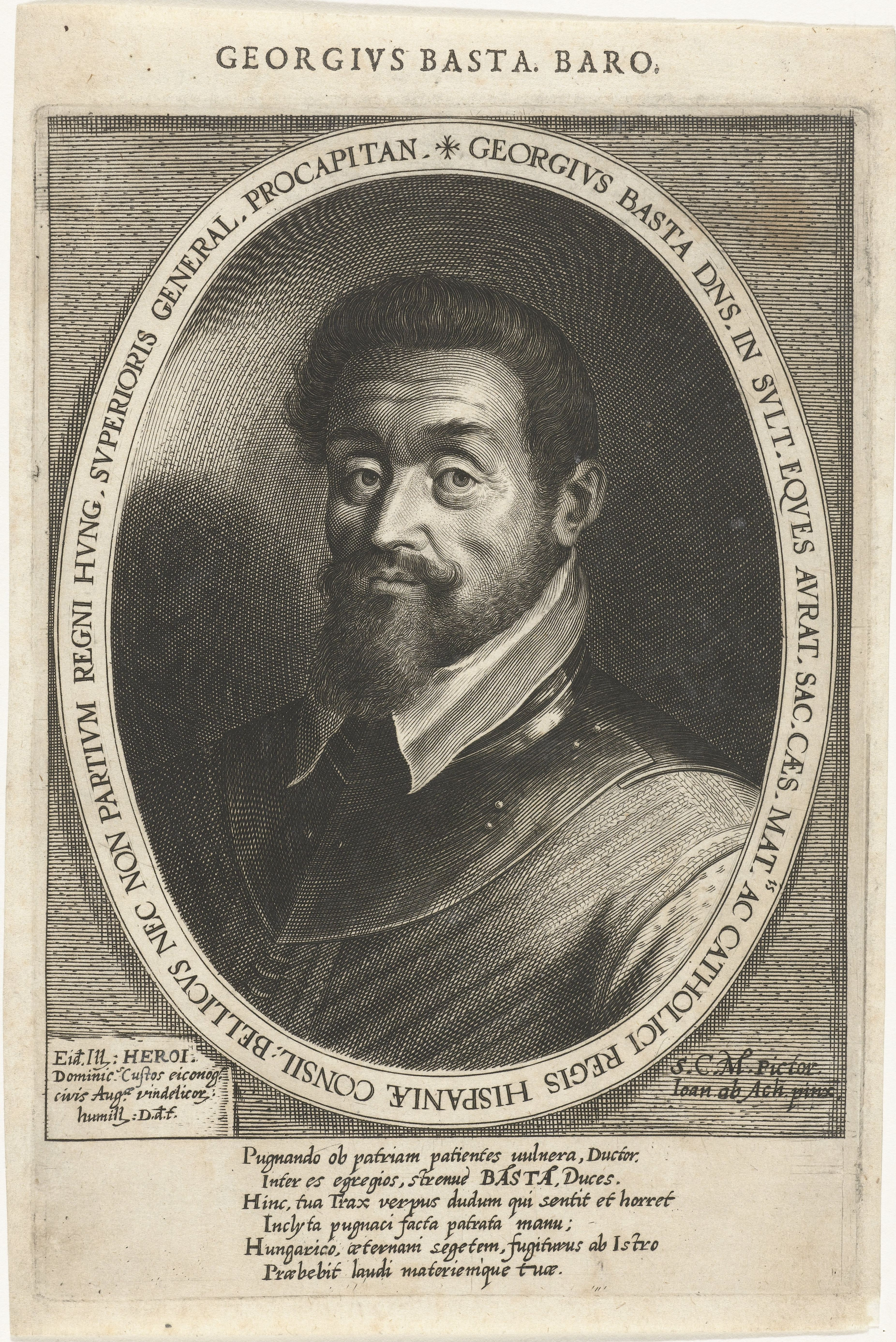
Gjergj Basta

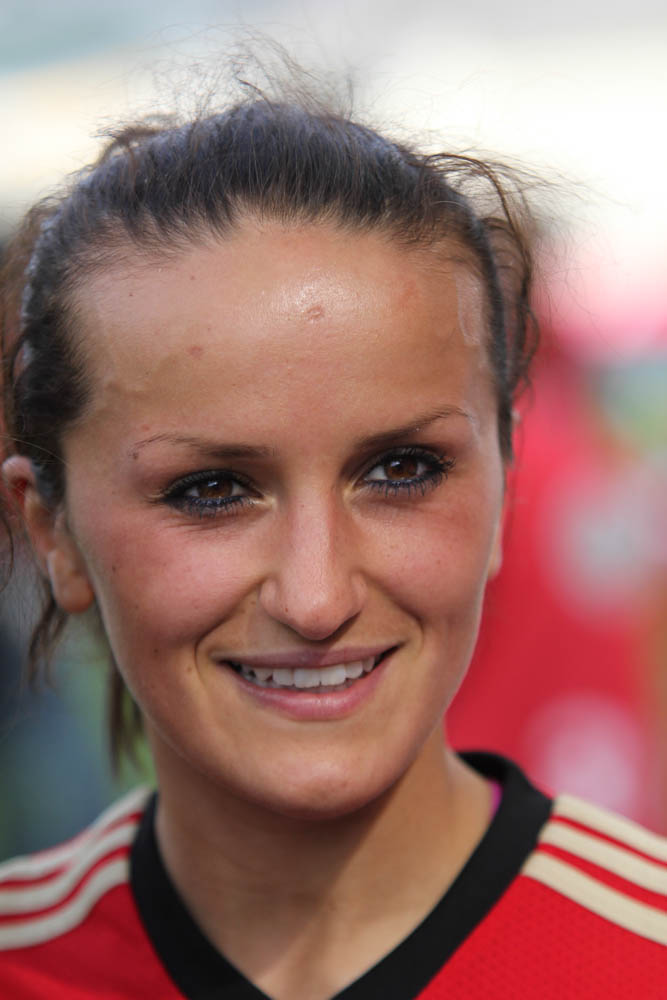
Fatmire Bajramaj

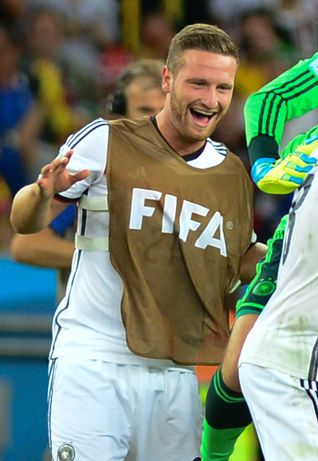
Shkodran Mustafi

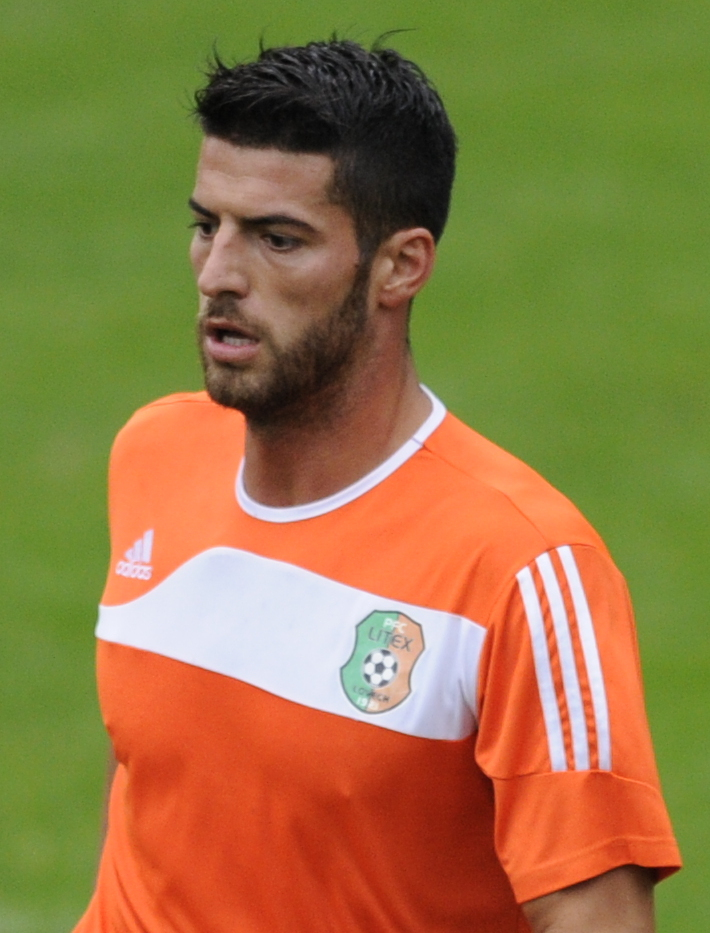
Jürgen Gjasula

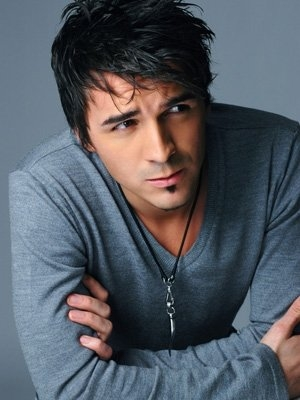
Blerim Destani

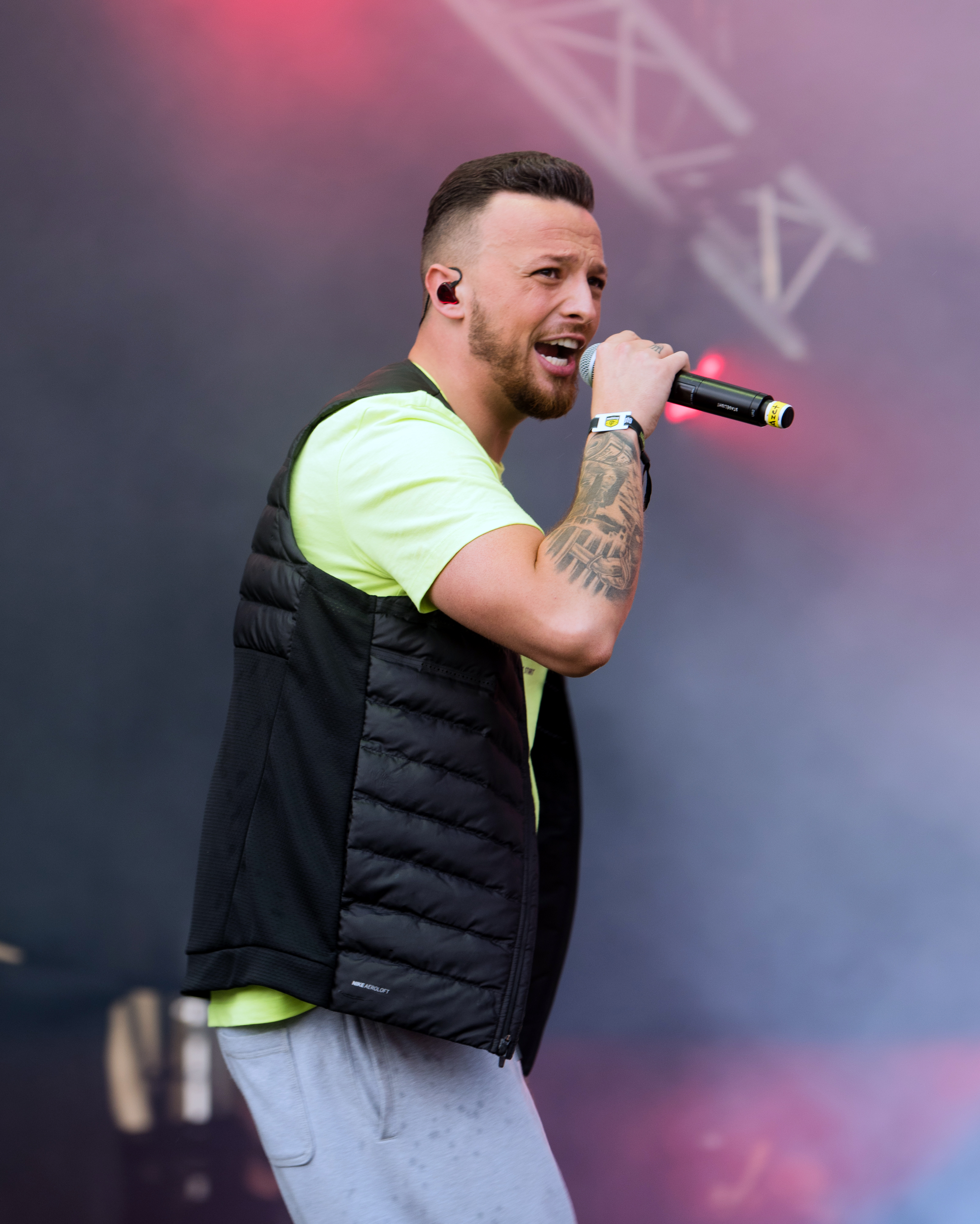
Azet

== See also ==
- Albania–Germany relations
- Immigration to Germany
- Albanian diaspora
- Albanians in Austria
- Albanians in Switzerland
