= Mehdi Hetemaj =

Austrian footballer (born 1997)

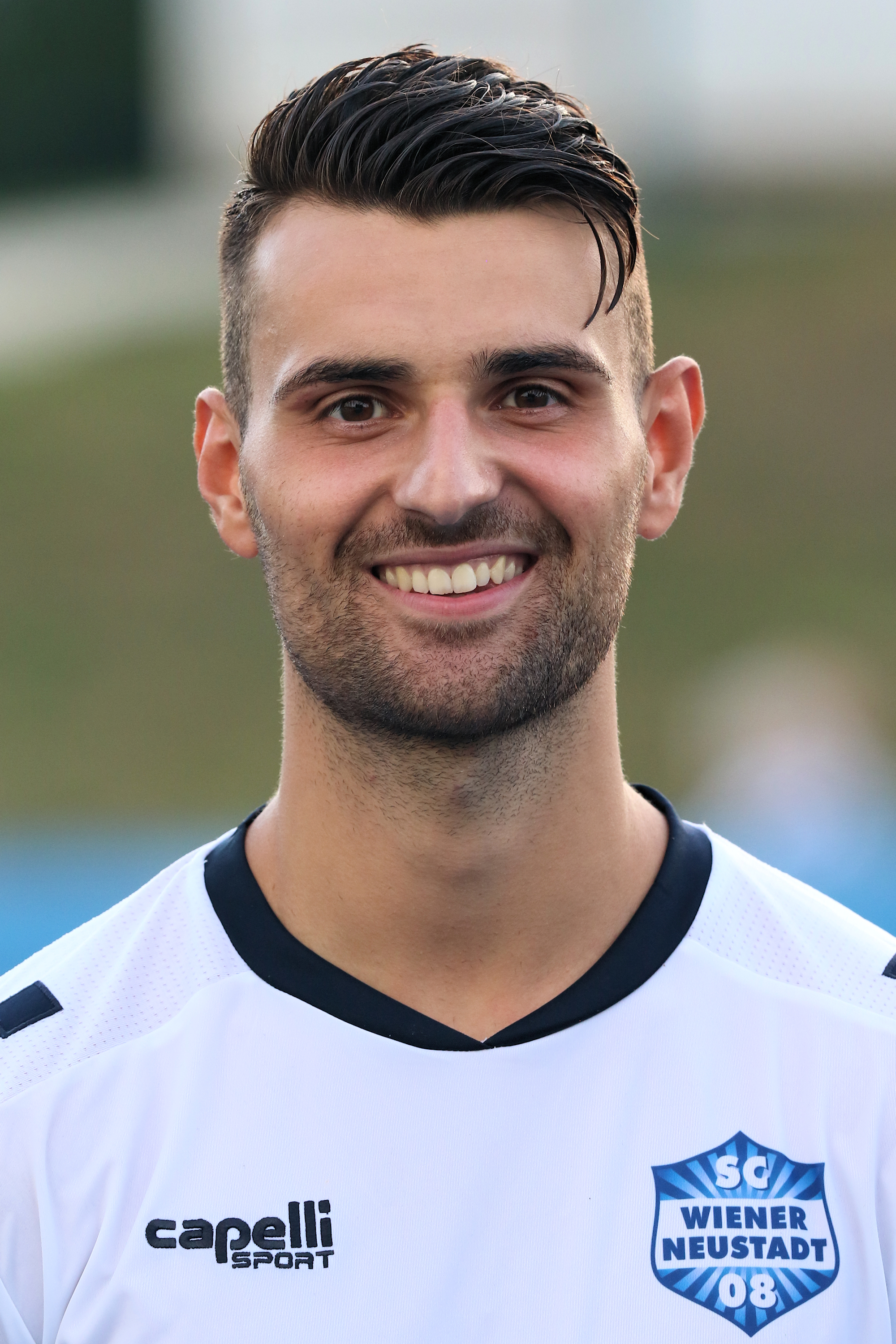
- Hetemaj with Wiener Neustadt in 2019

Personal information
- Date of birth: 7 May 1997 (age 29)
- Place of birth: St. Pölten, Austria
- Height: 1.89 m (6 ft 2 in)
- Position: Centre-back

Team information
- Current team: VfR Mannheim
- Number: 34

Youth career
- –2014: St. Pölten
- 2009: → ASV Radlberg (loan)

Senior career*
Years	Team	Apps	(Gls)
2014–2018	St. Pölten	0	(0)
2014–2018	St. Pölten II	60	(2)
2018–2019	SV Horn	18	(0)
2019–2020	Wiener Neustadt	17	(0)
2020–2021	Kukësi	8	(0)
2021	Mosta	9	(0)
2022	AC Oulu	17	(0)
2024	TPS	22	(2)
2025	SV Lafnitz	14	(0)
2025–2026	SGV Freiberg	27	(0)
2026–	VfR Mannheim	3	(0)
- * Club domestic league appearances and goals as of 26 June 2026

Mehdi Hetemaj (born 7 May 1997) is an Austrian professional football defender who plays for German Regionalliga Südwest club VfR Mannheim.

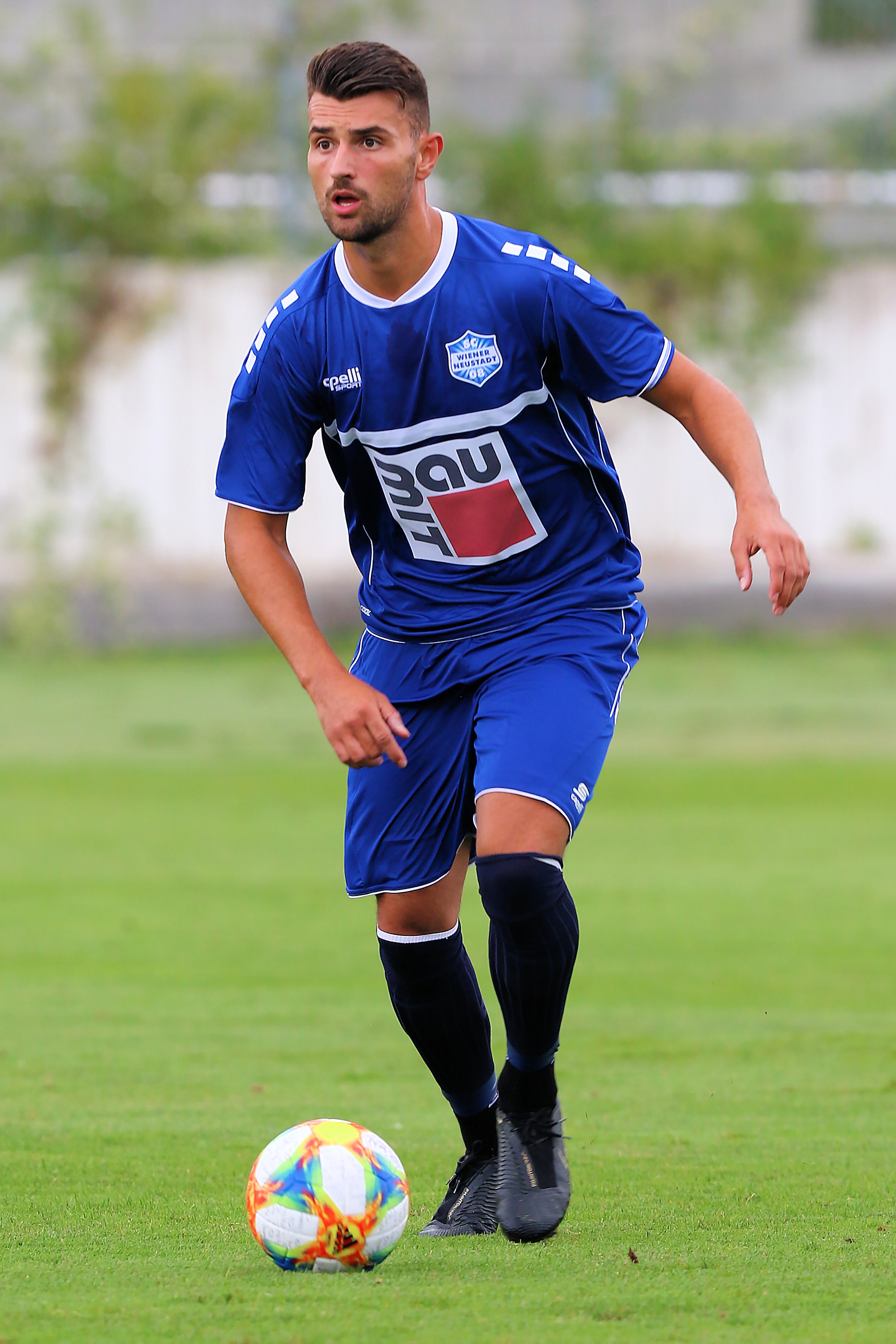
Hetemaj with Wiener Neustadt in 2019

== Personal life ==
Born in Austria, Hetemaj is of Kosovan Albanian descent.

== Career statistics ==
As of 29 June 2026

Appearances and goals by club, season and competition
Club	Season	League			Cup (Note: Includes Austrian Cup, Albanian Cup and Suomen Cup)		Other		Total	
Club	Season	Division	Apps	Goals	Apps	Goals	Apps	Goals	Apps	Goals
St. Pölten	2014–15	Austrian 2. Liga	0	0	0	0	–		0	0
St. Pölten II	2014–15	Austrian Regionalliga East	7	0	–		–		7	0
St. Pölten II	2015–16	Austrian Regionalliga East	8	0	–		–		8	0
St. Pölten II	2016–17	Austrian Regionalliga East	18	1	–		–		18	1
St. Pölten II	2017–18	Austrian Regionalliga East	27	1	–		–		27	1
St. Pölten II	Total		60	2	0	0	0	0	60	2
SV Horn	2018–19	Austrian 2. Liga	18	0	1	0	–		19	0
Wiener Neustadt	2019–20	Austrian Regionalliga East	17	0	–		–		17	0
Kukësi	2020–21	Kategoria Superiore	8	0	2	0	–		10	0
Mosta	2021–22	Maltese Premier League	9	0	–		–		9	0
AC Oulu	2022	Veikkausliiga	17	0	1	0	–		18	0
TPS	2024	Ykkösliiga	22	2	4	0	2 (Note: Includes Ykkösliigacup)	0	28	2
SV Lafnitz	2024–25	Austrian 2. Liga	14	0	0	0	–		14	0
SGV Freiberg	2025–26	Regionalliga Südwest	27	0	0	0	–		27	0
Career total			192	4	8	0	2	0	202	4
