= Albania–Germany relations =

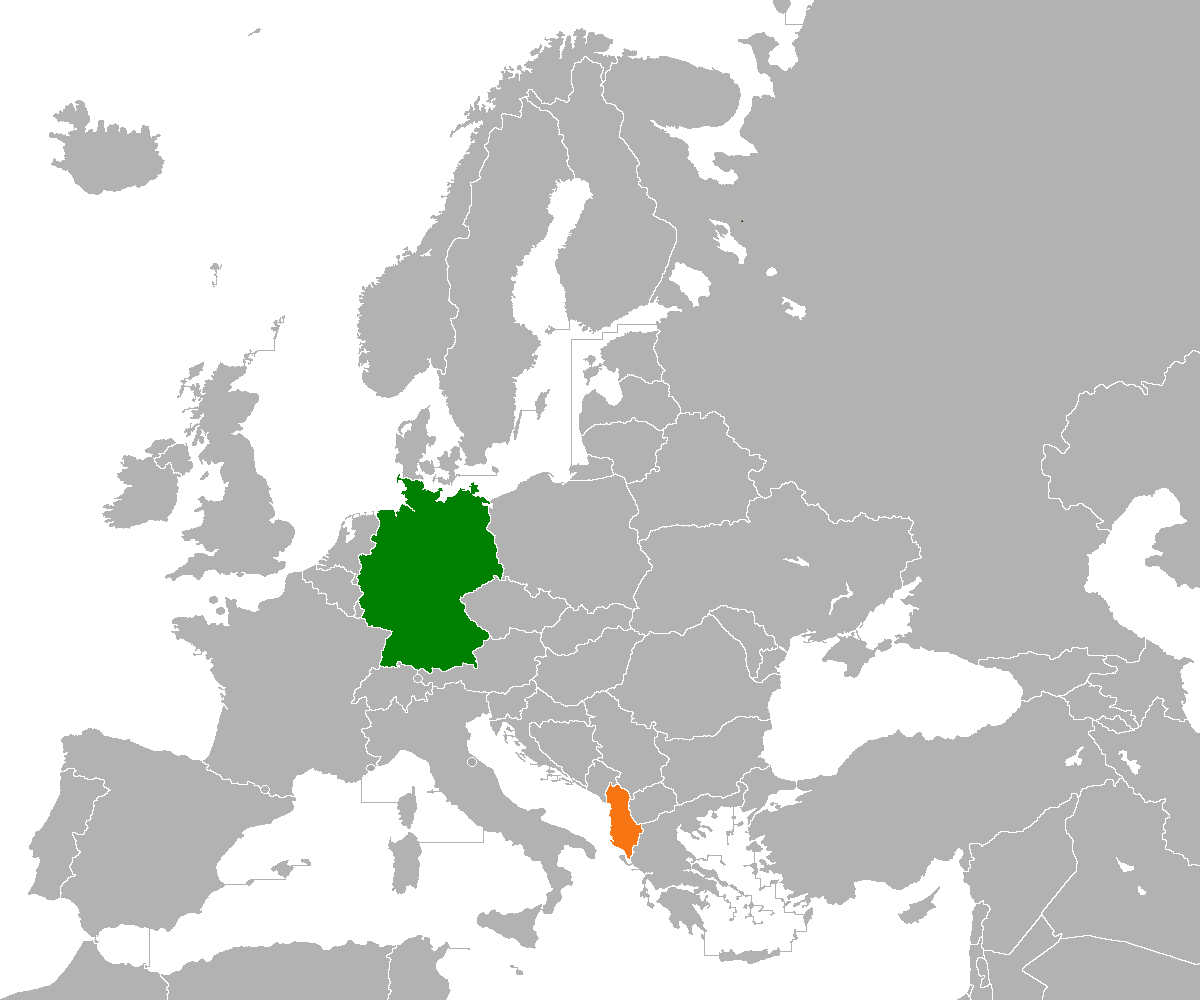

- Germany: Albania

Albania–Germany relations are the bilateral relations between Albania and Germany.

Albania has an embassy in Berlin, a general consulate in Munich and an honorary consulate in Essen and Stuttgart. Germany has an embassy in Tirana.

The countries are both members of NATO and Council of Europe. As a member and founder of the European Union (EU), Germany supports the Accession of Albania to the EU and is considered one of the strongest supporters of Albanian accession.

== History ==
In the middle of the 18th century, Albanian stratioti were employed by Empress Maria Theresa during the War of the Austrian Succession against Prussian and French troops.

After the Albanian declaration of Independence, Germany was one of the main European powers that recognized the new Albanian state at the London Conference of Ambassadors in December 1912. Shortly after, the new Albanian Principality was ruled by the German Prince Wilhelm zu Wied for six month in 1914. However, Albania and Germany didn't establish diplomatic relations until 18 May 1922.

=== Relations during WWII ===
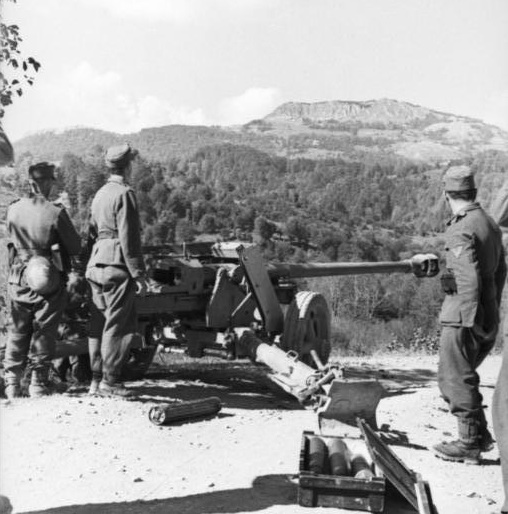
German troops in Albania, 1943.

On 9 September 1943, Nazi Germany launched an invasion of Albania following the collapse of Mussolini's fascist Italian government. The invasion was carried out by the 2nd Panzer Division, which deployed military convoys from Bulgaria, Greece, and Serbia into Albania. On 10 September, at 9AM, a special plenipotentiary for the Southeast region of the Ministry of Foreign Affairs, Hermann Neubacher, arrived in Tirana accompanied by special agent Von Schjager to oversee German interests in Albania.

On 6 July 1943, the Wehrmacht massacred 107 Albanian civilians in the village of Borovë, near Korçë. The victims were between four months and 80 years old. Among the dead were infants killed in their cradles.

=== West Germany and Albania during the Cold War ===
Normal relations between Albania and West Germany had for years been blocked by disagreement over wartime reparations, while the communist Albania had a more friendly stance on East Germany. On 2 December 1949 the Socialist government recognized East Germany and in 1952 diplomatic relations were established. The relations between the GDR and Albania deteriorated in the early 60s due to Albania siding with China during the Sino-Soviet split and Albania was to leave the Warsaw Pact in 1968 and the two countries had very poor relations afterwards.

After 1961 the relations were frozen and remained so, for more than 20 years, until in 1984, the Minister President of Bavaria Franz Josef Strauss visited the then-isolated communist Albania. The trip reflected Albania's wish for warmer ties with Western Europe. He was the first prominent West European politician to visit Albania since World War II.

Diplomatic relations between West Germany and Albania were officially established on 2 October 1987. An important event after the start of diplomatic relations was the six-hour visit of the German Minister of Foreign Affairs of the time, Hans Dietrich Genscher, to Tirana on 23 October 1987.

In June 1990, Albanians wanting to flee the communist regime stormed various western embassies in Tirana, including the West German Embassy. The flood of asylum-seekers was unleashed on 28 June, when regulations for foreign travel were released.

=== Relations after 1991 ===
Bilateral relations have become more lively since Albania launched its democratization process in 1991.

On 19 June 1991, Albania was formally admitted to the Conference on Security and Cooperation in Europe (CSCE), marking a significant step in its diplomatic integration with Europe. Germany played a crucial role in facilitating Albania's admission to the CSCE, strengthening diplomatic relations between the two nations. This event also highlighted Albania's determination to integrate into European political structures, with Germany as a key partner in this process.

In March 1997 the German military launched an evacuation mission named Operation Libelle after civil unrest broke out in Albania in response to the collapse of various fraudulent pyramid schemes. It was the first time since World War II that German infantry fired shots in combat.

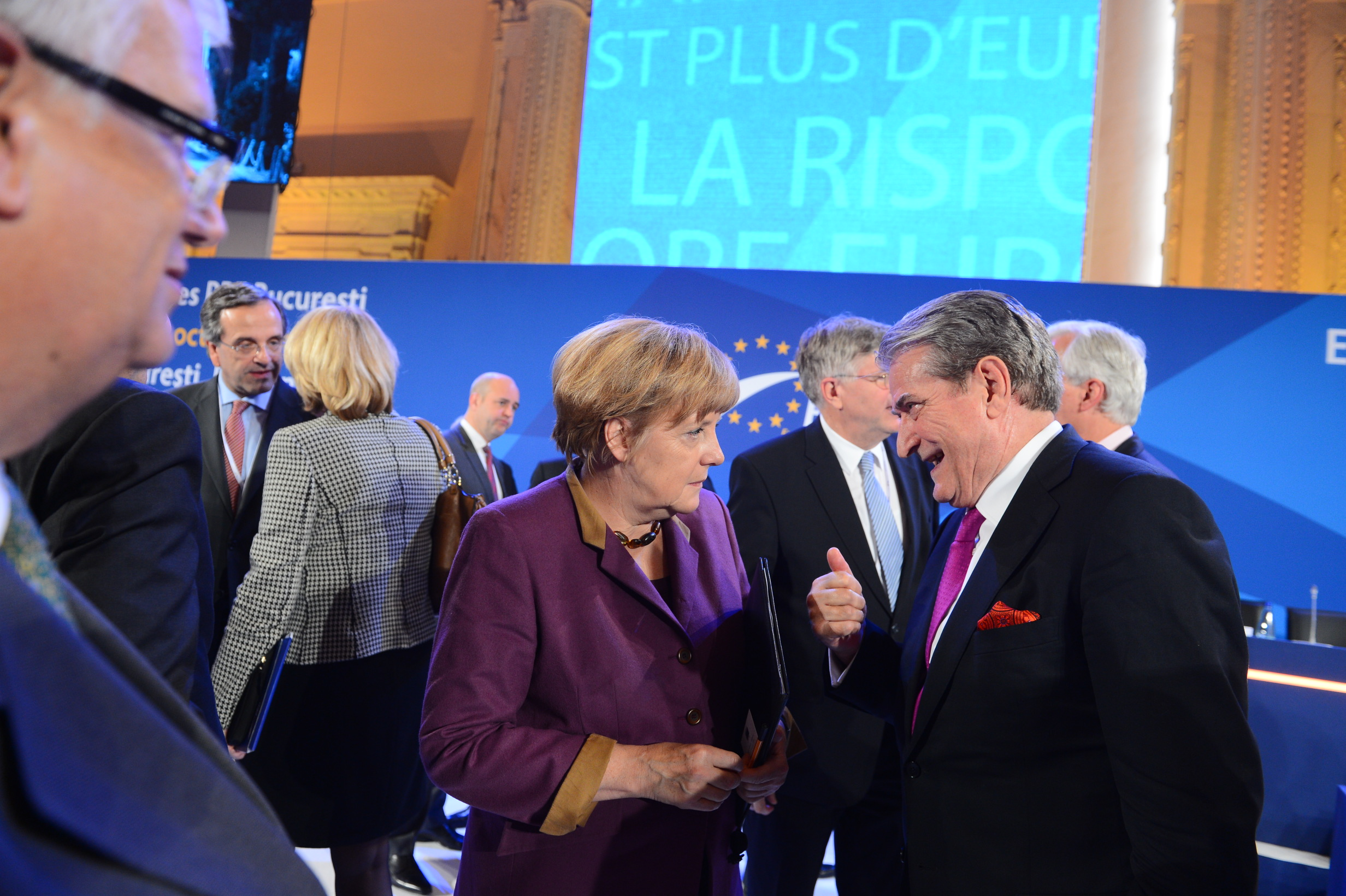
Former Chancellor Merkel with Albania's former Prime Minister Sali Berisha during an EPP Congress in 2012

In 2003, Albania started Stabilisation and Association Agreement talks with the European Union Since then, bilateral relations have had a special focus in supporting Albania's integration in the European Union.

In 2014, German Chancellor Angela Merkel initiated the Berlin Process to address geopolitical challenges, including concerns over conflict in the Western Balkans. For Albania, this process became crucial in promoting stability and supporting its path toward EU accession. While some questioned whether the Berlin Process was meant to replace or complement EU enlargement, Merkel's focus remained on maintaining peace in the region and advancing Albania's integration into the European Union.

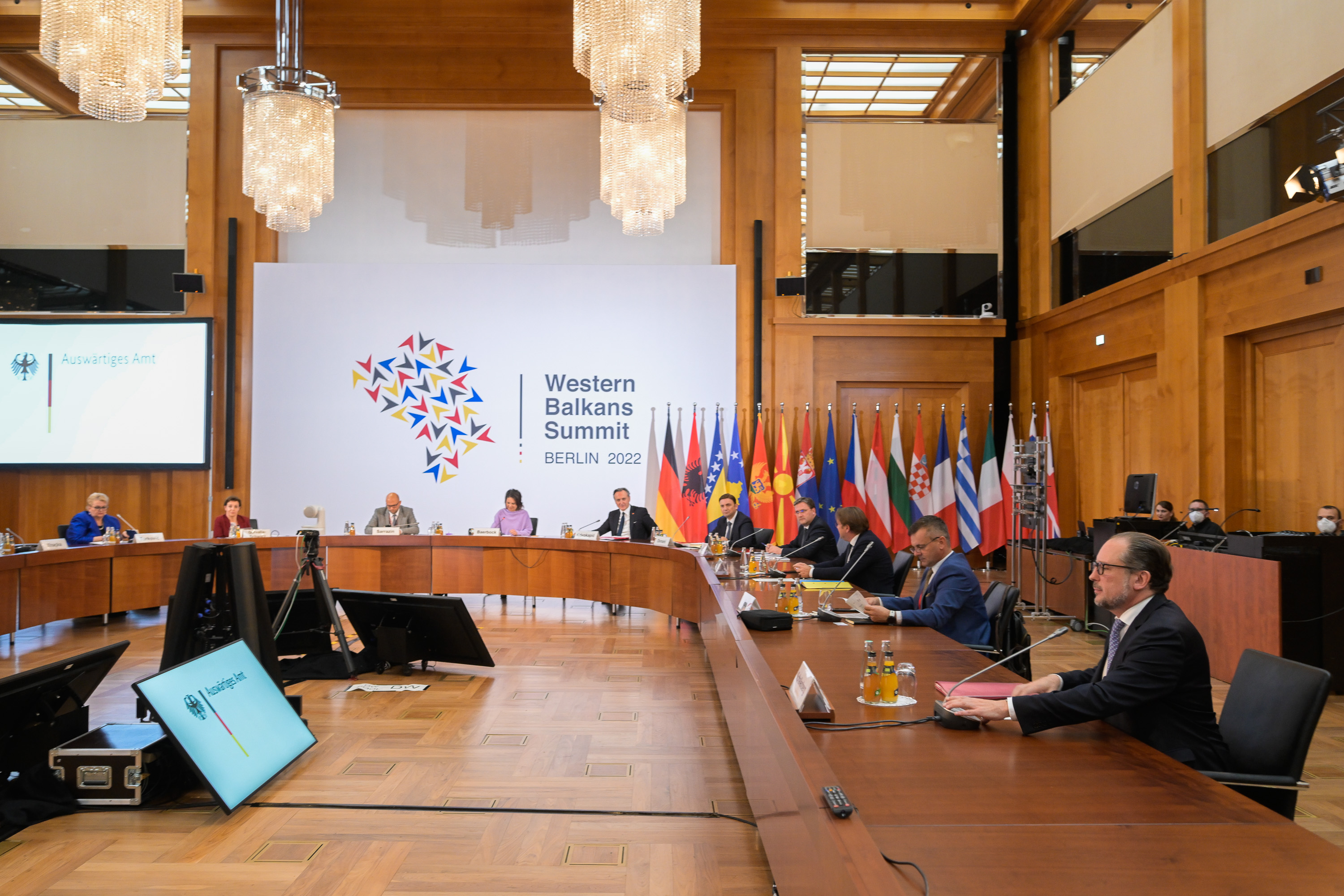
Western Balkans Conference held in Berlin on 21 October 2022 as part of the Berlin Process

Former German Chancellor Angela Merkel played a key role in shaping EU enlargement discussions for Albania and the Western Balkan countries. During her farewell visit to Tirana on 14 September 2021, she reaffirmed Germany's strong ties with Albania and the region. She expressed her lasting commitment, despite stepping down, and urged the next German government to continue addressing regional challenges.

Germany's President Frank-Walter Steinmeier described Albania as a "friendly country and an important partner" of the EU, during a high-level visit to Tirana in 2022. He emphasized the importance of strengthening ties between the two nations. Steinmeier also encouraged Albania to continue efforts in justice reform, tackling corruption, and pursuing EU membership.

On 1 October 2024, on the 10th anniversary of the start of the Berlin Process, German Foreign Minister Annalena Baerbock hosted in Berlin the 10th Western Balkans Summit, which she called as the Conference on Europe and a historic opportunity for a shared future in the European Union, reiterating once again Germany's support for the further enlargement of the European Union with Albania and the rest of the Western Balkan countries.

== Assistance and cooperation ==
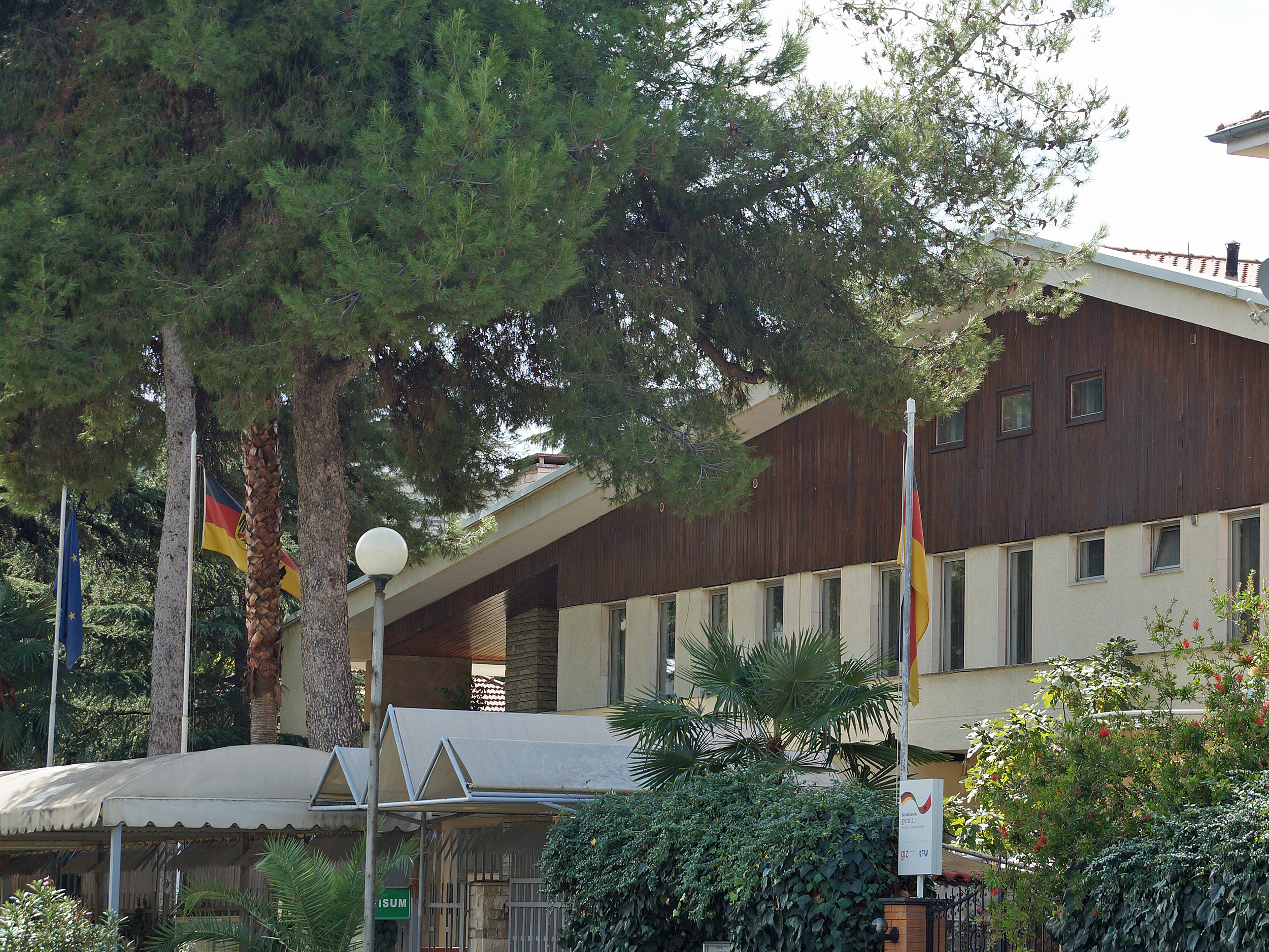
The German embassy building in Tirana

Germany is Albania's fourth largest trading partner. The volume of trade in 2021 amounted to 456.1 million euro. Of this total, imports from Germany accounted for 307.2 million euro and exports to Germany 148.85 million euro. The German Chamber of Commerce and Industry in Albania has 83 members, including Albanian, German and Austrian companies. German companies are mainly operating in the trade and logistics branches.

In 2008, to further develop economic relations, the German-Albanian Chamber of Commerce and Industry in Albania (DIHA) was founded.

Germany is the country's largest bilateral donor and has committed more than 1.2 billion euros since cooperation began, mainly in the form of reduced-interest loans. Government negotiations are held every two years.

Germany also supports and gives funds to 11 Albanian schools at which German is taught as a foreign language. Graduates in possession of the bilingual Albanian school-leaving certificate are directly entitled to study at a German university.

== See also ==
- Foreign relations of Albania
- Foreign relations of Germany
- Accession of Albania to the EU
- NATO-EU relations
- Albanians in Germany
