= VfR Mannheim =

- Full name: Verein für Rasenspiele e.V. Mannheim
- Nickname: Blau-Weiss-Rot
- Founded: 1896
- Ground: Rhein-Neckar-Stadion
- Capacity: 8,000
- Chairman: Boris Scheuermann
- Manager: Marcel Abele
- League: Regionalliga Südwest (IV)
- 2025–26: Oberliga Baden-Württemberg, 2nd of 18 (promoted)
| Home colours | Away colours |

VfR Mannheim is a German association football club based in Mannheim, Baden-Württemberg formed in 1911 out of the fusion of Mannheimer FG 1896, Mannheimer FG 1897 Union, and FC Viktoria 1897 Mannheim. The club captured the national title in 1949 with a victory over Borussia Dortmund. They currently play in Regionalliga Südwest, the fourth tier of German football.

== History ==
Predecessor sides FG Mannheim, Mannheimer FG Union and Viktoria Mannheim were each founding members of the German Football Association in 1900. These various Mannheim teams were members of the VSFV (Verband Süddeutscher Fussball Vereine or Federation of South German Football Clubs) and after their merger in 1911 played as VfR through the 1910s and 1920s in the Westkreis-Liga. The club emerged as the league champions of the Kreisliga Odenwald in 1922 and the Bezirksliga Rhein in 1925. They took part in the national playoffs after their Bezirksliga title and subsequent regional Süddeutschland win, but went out in an eighth final to TuRu Düsseldorf. The club finished in mid-table throughout the late 1920s and early 1930s in the Bezirksliga Rhein-Saar.

=== Success through the 1930s and 1940s ===
After the 1933 re-organization of German football under the Third Reich into sixteen top flight regional leagues, Mannheim began play in the Gauliga Baden. The club performed well in the years leading up to World War II and the throughout the conflict, taking division titles in 1935, 1938, 1939, 1943 and 1944. However they could not translate this success in league play into success in the national playoffs with their best result being an advance to the 1943 quarterfinals where they were put out 2–3 by eventual vice-champions FV Saarbrücken.

Mannheim repeated as division champions in 1944. Wartime conditions made playing football increasingly difficult in the country, so much so that the national playoffs were initially abandoned and VfR declared champions by the sport's governing authority. However, this decision was revoked after protests from other clubs and the playoff competition reinstated. Mannheim advanced only as far as the eighth final before being eliminated by 1. FC Nürnberg.

=== Postwar national championship ===
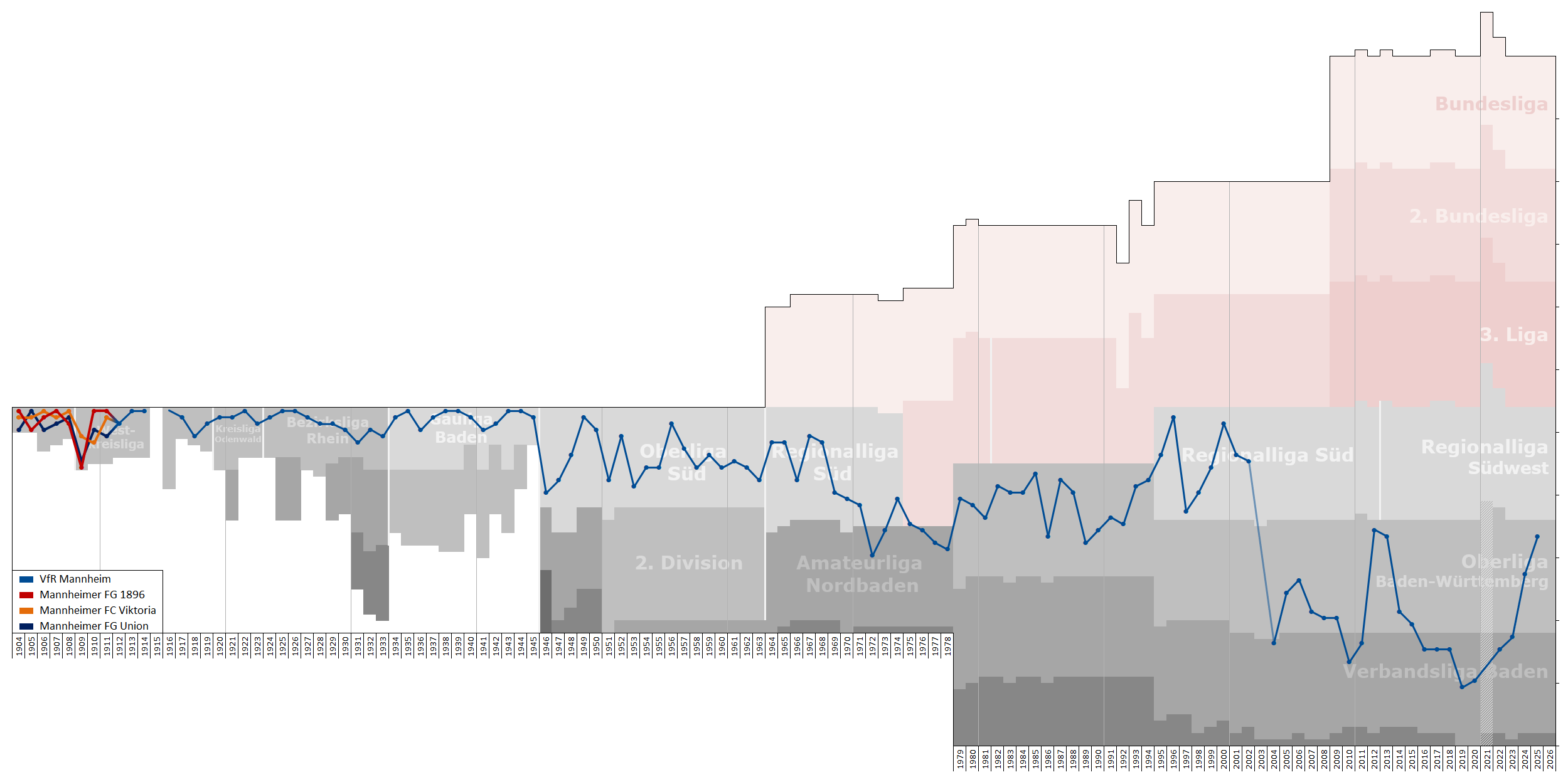
Historical chart of VfR Mannheim league performance

After the war VfR Mannheim played in the first division Oberliga Süd where they earned unremarkable results until a surprising breakthrough in 1949 that saw the team transform a distant second-place finish in their division into a national championship. After thrashing Hamburger SV 5–0 in the opening round, they upset Kickers Offenbach, who had finished eleven points ahead of them in their Oberliga division that season, by a score of 2–1. VfR then earned a come from behind 3–2 overtime victory over Borussia Dortmund in front of 90,000 fans in the final. Between 1903 and 1944 German national champions were awarded the Viktoria trophy. The 1944 final between Dresdner SC and Luftwaffen-SV Hamburg was the last Viktoria match ever played as the trophy disappeared at war's end. The missing prize was replaced by the Meisterschale in 1949 and was first awarded to Mannheim despite 1. FC Nürnberg being Germany's first postwar champions in 1948. Today the Meisterschale recognizes the country's Bundesliga champions and is inscribed with the names of each national championship team since 1903. The Viktoria has since been recovered and is held by the German Football Association.

The next year they again met Dortmund in the playoffs, this time in the opening round, and once again eliminated them. However, they would themselves be put out in the next round by Preußen Dellbrück and begin a slide into anonymity.

=== Descent from the top flight and progress in last years ===
Mannheim played in the second tier Regionalliga Süd formed in 1963 at the same time as Germany's new professional league, the Bundesliga. After ten years near or at the bottom of the league table they fell to tier III football, the Amateurliga Nordbaden. Despite ongoing financial problems they rebuffed offers of a merger from SV Waldhof Mannheim in 1998 and again in 2003. They were denied a license that year and driven to the Verbandsliga Nordbaden (V). However, the side performed well enough to win their division the next season and promotion to Oberliga Baden-Württemberg (IV), where they play today. With a sixteenth place in 2007–08, they narrowly avoided relegation, being on equal points with the seventeenth team.

After suffering relegation in 2009, the club took two seasons to recover before returning to the Oberliga in 2011. In its first season back the club finished second in the league behind SSV Ulm 1846. In the 2014–15 season the club came second-last in the league and was relegated to the Verbandsliga. Thanks to good performances, the team earned promotion to the Regionalliga Südwest at the end of the 2025–2026 season.

== Current squad ==
As of 8 September 2026

Note: Flags indicate national team as defined under FIFA eligibility rules; some limited exceptions apply. Players may hold more than one non-FIFA nationality.

| No. | Pos. | Nation | Player |
|---|---|---|---|
| 1 | GK | KOS | David Nreca-Bisinger |
| 4 | DF | CRO | Hans-Juraj Hartmann |
| 5 | DF | GER | Christian Kuhn |
| 6 | MF | BIH | Melvin Ramusović |
| 8 | MF | GER | Kevin Krüger |
| 9 | FW | GER | Lennart Thum |
| 10 | MF | GER | Lukas Rupp |
| 11 | MF | GER | Alexander Esswein |
| 14 | MF | ROU | Alexandru Paraschiv |
| 15 | MF | GER | Jannik Marx |
| 16 | DF | GER | Robin Becker |
| 17 | DF | GER | Luca Stellwagen |
| 18 | MF | GER | Pasqual Pander |
| 20 | MF | GER | Flamur Berisha |

| No. | Pos. | Nation | Player |
|---|---|---|---|
| 21 | DF | GER | Umut Sentürk |
| 22 | DF | GER | Leonardo Zikora |
| 23 | MF | GER | Mart Ristl |
| 24 | FW | MAR | Anas Alaoui |
| 27 | GK | GER | Malwin Zok |
| 29 | MF | GER | Marvin Kadner |
| 30 | FW | FRA | Nolhan Assafoua |
| 31 | DF | GER | Jonas Weik |
| 32 | DF | GER | Vincent Moreno Giesel |
| 34 | DF | AUT | Mehdi Hetemaj |
| 36 | DF | GER | Tim Seifert |
| 37 | DF | ITA | Tyrese Ziegler |
| - | GK | GER | Marcus Retter |

== Honours ==
The club's honours:

=== League ===
- German football championship
  - Champions: 1949
- Southern German championship
  - Champions: 1925

=== Regional ===
- Westkreis-Liga (I)
  - Champions: 1910, 1911, 1913, 1914
- Kreisliga Odenwald (I)
  - Champions: 1922
  - Runners-up: 1920, 1921
- Bezirksliga Rhein (I)
  - Champions: 1925, 1926
  - Runners-up: 1924, 1927
- Gauliga Baden (I)
  - Champions: 1935, 1938, 1939, 1943, 1944
  - Runners-up: 1934, 1937, 1940
- Amateurliga Nordbaden (III)
  - Champions: 1973, 1976
- Verbandsliga Nordbaden (V)
  - Champions: 2004
  - Runners-up: 2011
- Southern German Cup
  - Winners: 1959
- North Baden Cup (Tiers III-VII)
  - Winners: 1972, 1997, 2001
  - Runners-up: 2004, 2026

=== Other sports ===
- The club has won the German championship in baseball in 1965, 1966 and 1970.

== Recent managers ==
Recent managers of the club:

| Manager | Start | Finish |
|---|---|---|
| Rainer Ulrich | 1 January 2005 | 31 June 2006 |
| Walter Pradt | 1 July 2006 | 17 April 2007 |
| Rainer Ulrich | 18 April 2007 | 30 June 2007 |
| Dieter Heimen | 1 July 2007 | 25 October 2007 |
| Ralf Köhnlein | 26 October 2007 | 31 December 2007 |
| Rafael Sánchez | 1 January 2008 | 13 January 2009 |
| Gernot Jüllich | 13 January 2009 | 28 January 2011 |
| Kenan Kocak | 2 February 2011 | 30 June 2013 |

== Recent seasons ==
The recent season-by-season performance of the club:

| Season | Division | Tier | Position |
|---|---|---|---|
| 1999–2000 | Regionalliga Süd | III | 3rd |
| 2000–01 | Regionalliga Süd | III | 8th |
| 2001–02 | Regionalliga Süd | III | 9th ↓ |
| 2002–03 | Oberliga Baden-Württemberg | IV | 10th ↓ |
| 2003–04 | Verbandsliga Baden | V | 1st ↑ |
| 2004–05 | Oberliga Baden-Württemberg | IV | 12th |
| 2005–06 | Oberliga Baden-Württemberg | IV | 10th |
| 2006–07 | Oberliga Baden-Württemberg | IV | 15th |
| 2007–08 | Oberliga Baden-Württemberg | IV | 16th |
| 2008–09 | Oberliga Baden-Württemberg | V | 16th ↓ |
| 2009–10 | Verbandsliga Baden | VI | 4th |
| 2010–11 | Verbandsliga Baden | VI | 2nd ↑ |
| 2011–12 | Oberliga Baden-Württemberg | V | 2nd |
| 2012–13 | Oberliga Baden-Württemberg | V | 3rd |
| 2013–14 | Oberliga Baden-Württemberg | V | 15th |
| 2014–15 | Oberliga Baden-Württemberg | V | 17th ↓ |
| 2015–16 | Verbandsliga Baden | VI | 3rd |
| 2016–17 | Verbandsliga Baden | VI | 3rd |
| 2017–18 | Verbandsliga Baden | VI | 3rd |
| 2018–19 | Verbandsliga Baden | VI | 9th |
| 2019–20 | Verbandsliga Baden | VI | 8th |
| 2020–21 | Verbandsliga Baden | VI | 10th |
| 2021–22 | Verbandsliga Baden | VI | 3rd |
| 2022–23 | Verbandsliga Baden | VI | 1st ↑ |
| 2023–24 | Oberliga Baden-Württemberg | V | 9th |
| 2024–25 | Oberliga Baden-Württemberg | V | 3rd |
| 2025–26 | Oberliga Baden-Württemberg | V | 2nd ↑ |

- With the introduction of the Regionalligas in 1994 and the 3. Liga in 2008 as the new third tier, below the 2. Bundesliga, all leagues below dropped one tier.

| ↑ Promoted | ↓ Relegated |
