= David Nreca-Bisinger =

Kosovan footballer

Personal information
- Full name: David Tobias Nreca-Bisinger
- Birth name: David Nreca
- Date of birth: 18 January 2002 (age 24)
- Place of birth: Gjakova, FR Yugoslavia
- Height: 1.87 m (6 ft 2 in)
- Position: Goalkeeper

Team information
- Current team: VfR Mannheim
- Number: 1

Youth career
- 2007–2012: SG Eintracht Sirnau
- 2012–2014: FSV Waiblingen
- 2014–2016: FC Esslingen
- 2016–2018: VfB Stuttgart
- 2018–2019: Sonnenhof Großaspach

Senior career*
Years	Team	Apps	(Gls)
2019–2022	Sonnenhof Großaspach	29	(0)
2022–2023	Stuttgarter Kickers	5	(0)
2023–2024	TSV Steinbach Haiger II	7	(0)
2023–2024	TSV Steinbach Haiger	2	(0)
2024–	VfR Mannheim	50	(0)

International career^{‡}
2018–2019	Kosovo U17	6	(0)
2019	Kosovo U19	1	(0)
2020–2023	Kosovo U21	15	(0)
- * Club domestic league appearances and goals as of 24 September 2026 ‡ National team caps and goals as of 27 March 2023

David Tobias Nreca-Bisinger (born 18 January 2002) is a Kosovan professional footballer who plays as a goalkeeper for German club VfR Mannheim.

== Club career ==
=== Early career ===
Nreca-Bisinger at the age of 5, he started playing football as forward in SG Eintracht Sirnau, where after five years it was transferred to FSV Waiblingen. He was 12 years old in 2014, when the coach during a tournament switched the playing position of Nreca-Bisinger from forward to goalkeeper, which resulted with success after was declared being the best goalkeeper of that tournament. Nreca-Bisinger besides being was part of FSV Waiblingen, he was part even of FC Esslingen (2014–2016) and VfB Stuttgart (2016–2018).

=== Sonnenhof Großaspach ===
On 1 July 2018, Nreca-Bisinger joined with youth team of Sonnenhof Großaspach. On 16 April 2019, he signed his first professional contract with first team of Sonnenhof Großaspach after agreeing to a two-year deal. On 4 July 2020, Nreca-Bisinger made his debut as professional footballer in a 1–0 away defeat against Carl Zeiss Jena after being named in the starting line-up.

== International career ==
=== Under-17 ===
In July 2018, Nreca-Bisinger received a call-up from Kosovo U17 for a gathering with footballers from Kosovan diaspora. After three months, he was named as part of the Kosovo U17 squad for 2019 UEFA European Under-17 Championship qualifications. Two days later, Nreca-Bisinger made his debut with Kosovo U17 in the 2019 UEFA European Under-17 Championship qualifications match against Scotland U17 after being named in the starting line-up.

=== Under-21 ===
On 2 October 2020, Nreca-Bisinger received a call-up from Kosovo U21 for a 2021 UEFA European Under-21 Championship qualification matches against Austria U21 and Andorra U21. On 13 October 2020, he made his debut with Kosovo U21 in the match against Andorra U21 after being named in the starting line-up.

== Personal life ==
Nreca-Bisinger was born in Gjakova, Kosovo to a Kosovo Albanian divorced mother, he as a two-year-old and his mother moved to Esslingen am Neckar, Germany and after her marriage to a German, in addition to the surname Nreca he also took the surname of his stepfather, Bisinger, making the surname Nreca-Bisinger.

== Career statistics ==
=== Club ===
As of 1 November 2020

Club	Season	League			Cup		Other (Note: Including other competitions, such as Württemberg Cup)		Total	
Club	Season	Division	Apps	Goals	Apps	Goals	Apps	Goals	Apps	Goals
Sonnenhof Großaspach	2019–20	3. Liga	1	0	0	0	1	0	2	0
Sonnenhof Großaspach	2020–21	Regionalliga Südwest	4	0	0	0	0	0	4	0
Sonnenhof Großaspach	Total		5	0	0	0	1	0	6	0
Career total			5	0	0	0	1	0	6	0
