= Albanians in Switzerland =

Total population
- Switzerland 300,000 - 400,000

Regions with significant populations
- Aargau; Basel; Basel-Land; Basel-Stadt; Bern; Geneva; Lucerne; Schaffhausen; Solothurn; Ticino; Vaud; Zürich

Languages
- Albanian; French; German; Italian

Religion
- Islam; Christianity

Related ethnic groups
- Albanians in Austria and Germany

The Albanians in Switzerland (German: Albaner in der Schweiz, French: Albanais en Suisse, Italian: Albanesi in Svizzera, Albanian: Shqiptarët në Zvicër) are Albanian migrants in Switzerland and their descendants. They mostly trace their origins to Kosovo, North Macedonia and to a lesser extent to Albania and other Albanian-speaking territories in the Balkan Peninsula. Their exact number is difficult to determine as some ethnic Albanians hold citizenship of North Macedonia, Serbia or other former Yugoslav countries.

There were substantial numbers of Albanians in Switzerland from the former Yugoslavia during the 1990s and 2000s. While moderate numbers of Yugoslav citizens had residence in Switzerland during the 1980s, the bulk of immigration took place as a consequence of the Yugoslav Wars and the later Kosovo War, as well as by means of family reunion of those who had immigrated during this period.

About half a million immigrants from the former Yugoslavia lived in Switzerland as of 2009, corresponding to roughly 6.5% of total Swiss population. About half of this number are Albanians (mostly Kosovar Albanians and to a lesser extent Albanians from North Macedonia and Albanians from Serbia).

Taken as a single group, people from former Yugoslavia are the largest immigrant group in Switzerland, followed by the Italians at about 294,000. From the ethnic perspective, Albanians form the second largest immigrant group.

== History ==
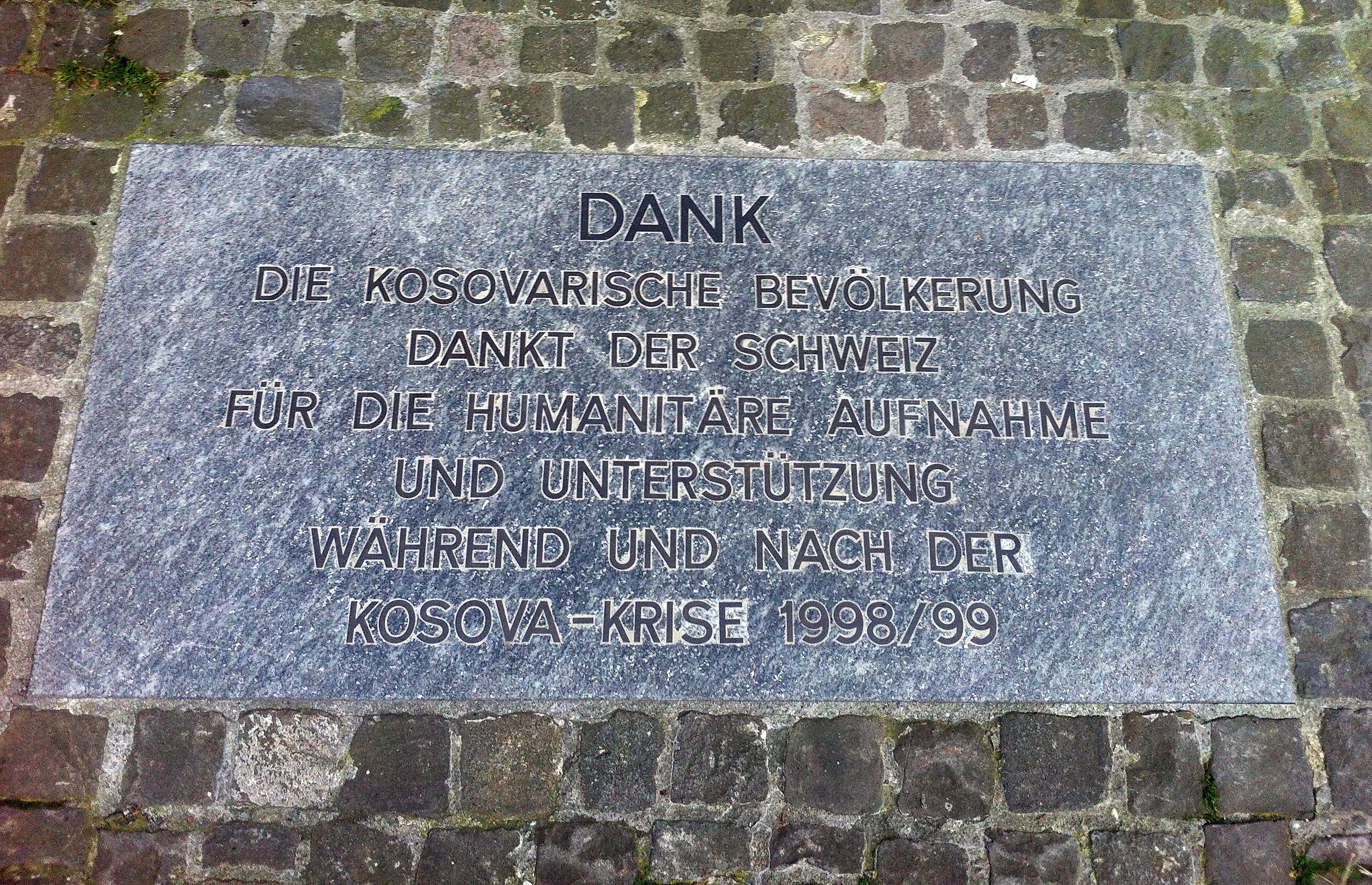
Commemorative plaque at the Fraumünster in Zurich, in which the Albanian community expresses its gratitude for Switzerland's pro Albanian policy during the Kosovo War.

Until the second half of the 20th century, there were very few contacts between Albania and Switzerland.

Due to the high unemployment of the Albanians in Kosovo, Serbia, Montenegro and North Macedonia, many Albanians came as guest workers in Switzerland in the 1970s. The Albanians quickly found work and integrated themselves into social structures in Switzerland. Many of the guest workers stayed in Switzerland and soon brought in the whole family.

Until the 1980s there were almost only male migrant workers in Switzerland who were hardly perceived as Albanians in society because of their Yugoslavian citizenship. Many stayed in Switzerland for so long, so that later on they were able to profit from family reunification.

In the 1990s, years Switzerland's service as an important center for the Albanian diaspora from Kosovo. Several would publish in Switzerland newspapers Albanian-speaking, while you serve as the basis for KLA financings and organization.

Thus, the number of Albanians in Switzerland jumped when the situation in the 1990s in Kosovo became increasingly difficult. Both the host country and the Albanians were ill-prepared for this situation and expressed difficulty in coping with the situation.

=== Reception ===
The image of the groups from Former Yugoslavia in Swiss society is very poor. In a survey performed in Zurich in 2011, "Former Yugoslavs" were found to be the least popular immigrant group, followed by Turks, Arabs and Germans. The Albanians have been singled out for their particularly poor image. As the largest group, they tend to be the most visible, besides the factor of opposition against Islam in Switzerland, and the problem of immigrant criminality. In a 2010 statistic, young males of the former Serbia and Montenegro (which to a large extent corresponds to the Kosovar Albanians in Switzerland) were found to have a crime rate of 31% of the young males in Swiss population, while those from Croatia, Bosnia and Herzegovina and Macedonia had crime rates of 23%–24% of the Swiss value. It has been pointed out that the crime rates cannot be the only reason for the group's poor image, as the crime rate of the Sri Lankans in Switzerland was still higher, at 47%, while that group has a much better reputation.

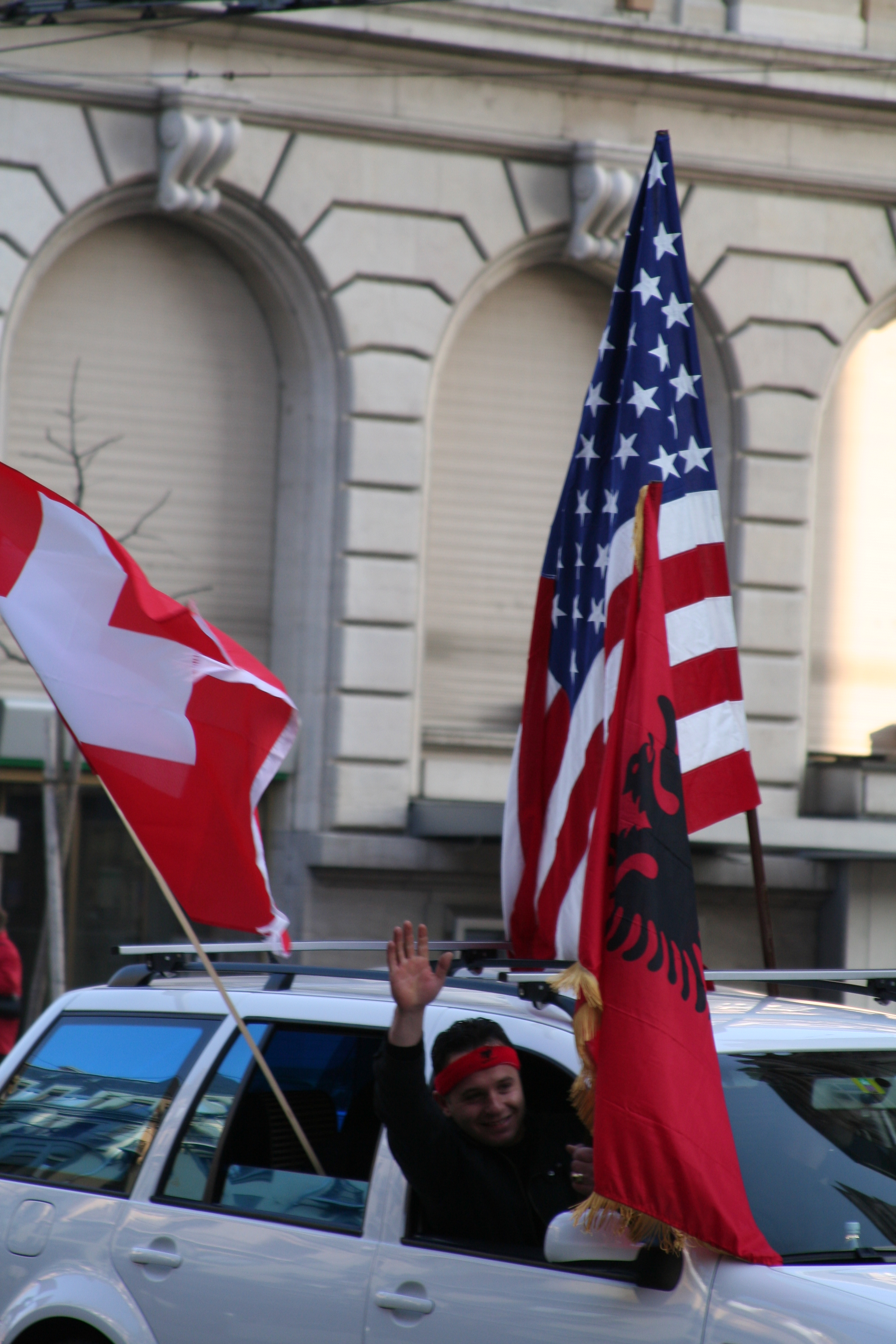
Albanians celebrate the Declaration of Independence of the Republic of Kosovo in Lausanne on 17 February 2008.

=== Acceptance and discrimination ===
Not infrequently, the Albanian diaspora in Switzerland is affected by xenophobia and racism. Many integration difficulties and criminal offenses of some criminal Albanians has caused many Swiss to be prejudiced against Albanians, which has led to fear, hatred and insecurity.

Political parties that publicly oppose excessive immigration and the conservatism of traditional Swiss culture - in particular the Swiss People's Party (SVP) - strengthen this negative attitude among many party supporters. These parties have already launched a number of popular initiatives, which were referred to by the Albanians as discriminatory. In 1998, the Zurich SVP created an election poster with the words "Kosovo Albanians" and "No" in large letters when it came to financing an integration project for Albanians. In 2009, the Swiss People's Initiative "Against the Construction of Minarets" was adopted by the Swiss people. Many Muslim Albanians were outraged by this result and expressed their rejection. In 2010, the so-called "expulsion initiative" followed, which was also adopted by the voters. According to the law, foreigners who have committed serious crimes should be expelled from the country. The initiative on foreigners crime should thus reduce the crime rate and make the naturalization of foreigners more difficult. The "Sheep's Poster" designed by the SVP attracted international attention and was again described by many immigrant organizations in Switzerland as discriminatory.

Economic integration continues to present difficulties for Albanians in Switzerland. In October 2018, Kosovo's unemployment rate was 7.0% and in North Macedonia population 5.3%, well above the figure for the rest of the permanent resident population. A study by the Federal Office for Migration justifies this with in part low vocational qualifications among the older generation and the reservations that Albanian youth are exposed to when entering the world of work. In the 1990s, many well-qualified Albanians, because of unrecognized diplomas, with jobs such. B. in construction or in the catering trade, in which the unemployment is generally higher. This also has implications for the social assistance rate, which is higher for ethnic Albanians, with significant differences depending on the country of origin. The most affected are people from Albania. In contrast, the number of students with Albanian descent is increasing today. In 2008, only 67 people were enrolled at Swiss universities, there are already 460 in 2017. Albanologists and migration researchers today assume that the integration and assimilation of Albanians is increasing, analogous to the development of Italians in Switzerland.

In its annual report, Amnesty International stated in 2010 that the "anti-minaret initiative" stigmatized Albanian Muslims in Switzerland and increased racism in Switzerland in general

== Demography ==
Table with the 10 most spoken languages in Switzerland as of 2000. The Albanian language is illustrated in dark orange with about 95,000 speakers.

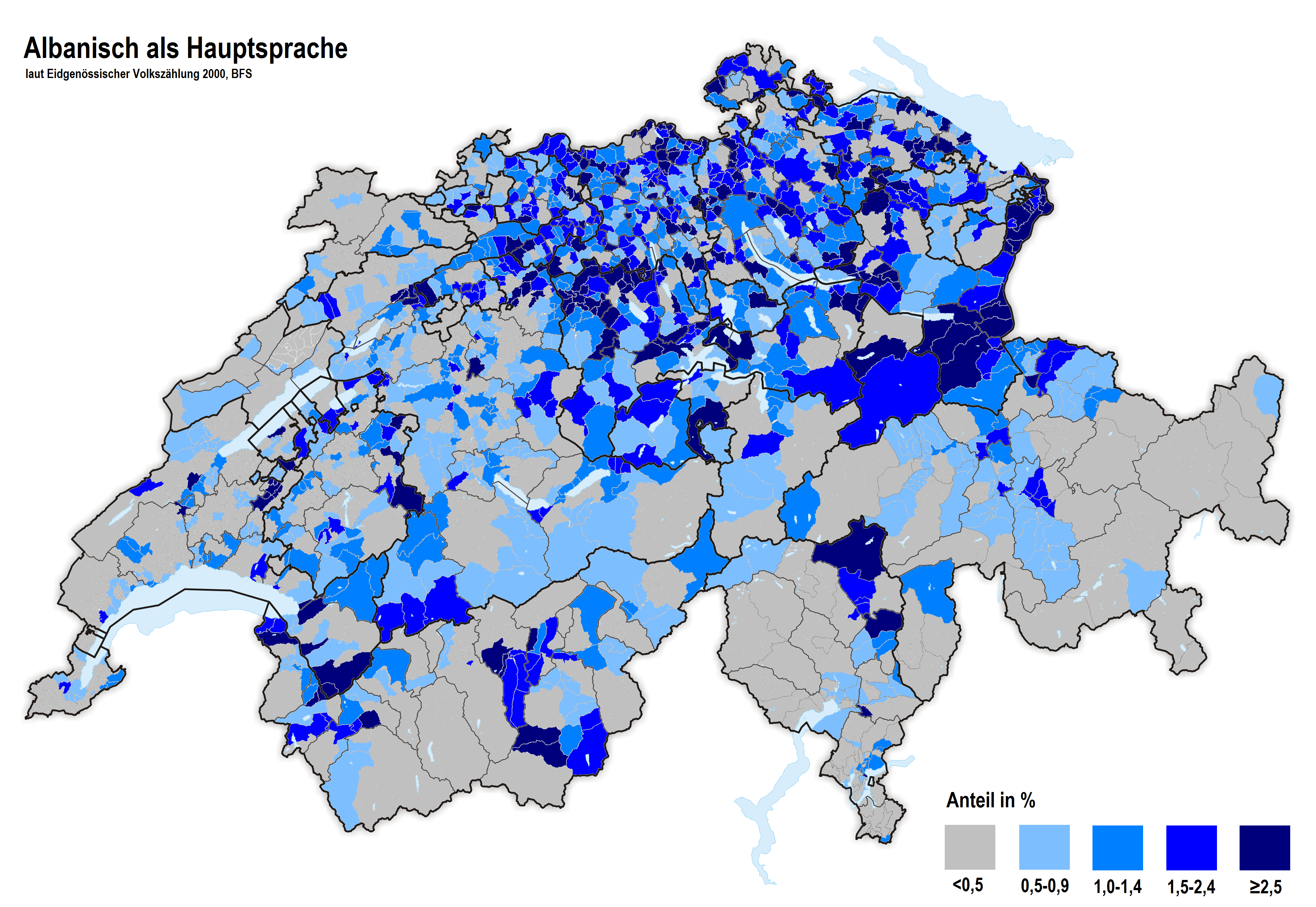
The Albanian language as the language of best command in Switzerland as of 2000.

In Switzerland, no statistics have been collected so far on how many people call themselves Albanians. Based on the 2000 census, the number of Albanian speakers was estimated at 170,000. In 2012, there were 1302 people from Albania, 79,261 with Kosovar citizenship and 61,668 with Macedonian nationality, with neither all Kosovars nor all Macedonians being Albanians. The total number of people living in Switzerland Albanian descent of inclusive naturalized and dual citizens is currently estimated at about 200,000. 3.1% of the permanent population in Switzerland in 2016 stated that they use Albanian as the main language, which corresponds to 258,415. Thus, the Albanians belong together with the 316,525 Italians, the 303,525 Germans and the 268,660 Portuguese to the largest groups of foreigners in Switzerland.

The Albanians concentrate in German-speaking Switzerland. Important centers of the Albanian diaspora in Switzerland are Zurich, Basel, Bern, Winterthur and St. Gallen.

The number of Albanians living in Switzerland has not been officially recorded, because official statistics differentiate foreigners according to their nationality. Albanians were recorded as Albanian, Macedonian, Swiss or Serb nationals. Individuals from the Balkans can be naturalized above average. These naturalized Swiss disappear completely in the statistics.

=== Statistics ===
The cantons with the most significant concentration of Albanians are Aargau, Basel-Stadt and Landschaft, Bern, Geneva, St. Gallen and Zürich mostly in German-speaking Switzerland and to a lesser extent in French-speaking Switzerland and Italian-speaking Switzerland. The most lesser number are to be found in Appenzell Ausserrhoden, Appenzell Innerrhoden, Nidwalden and Obwalden.

The distribution of Albanians in Switzerland (2018):

Canton	(Albania) Albanian nationals	(Kosovo) Kosovan nationals
Aargau	183	18,120
Appenzell Ausserrhoden	8	322
Appenzell Innerrhoden	0	11
Basel-Landschaft	53	3,743
Basel-Stadt	69	2,320
Bern	227	8,910
Fribourg	53	4,655
Genève	266	5,827
Glarus	3	844
Graubünden	6	585
Jura	11	565
Luzern	92	7,875
Neuchâtel	22	1,176
Nidwalden	4	340
Obwalden	0	284
Schaffhausen	20	1,425
Schwyz	13	2,941
Solothurn	73	5,831
St. Gallen	119	9,590
Thurgau	47	2,855
Ticino	102	1,729
Uri	4	131
Valais	34	2,211
Vaud	299	9,793
Zug	24	1,291
Zürich	381	18,452
Switzerland	2,113	111,826

== Culture ==
=== Organisations ===
Since the 1990s, numerous associations have sprung up in Switzerland, with the goal of representing the Albanian diaspora community. Initially, these were only religious and native groups in some major cities, later organizations and communities were established, which should represent all Albanians throughout Switzerland.

Among the strongest member associations is the Albanian Community in Switzerland (Albanian Bashkësia Shqiptare në Zvicër). For the Muslims occurs above all the Union of Albanian imams in Switzerland (albi Unioni i imamëve shqiptarë në Zvicër) and the Albanian-Islamic Federation of Switzerland (Alb.Bashkësia Islame Shqiptare Zvicër). Among the largest intellectual grouping is the union of Albanian intellectuals in Switzerland (Alb.Bashkimi i Intelektualëve Shqiptarë në Zvicër). Associations for the exchange between Albanians and Swiss are the Institut Suisse d'Etudes Albanaises (ISEAL) and the Society Switzerland-Albania.

In addition, there are now a variety of smaller clubs such as football clubs, dance groups, local representations of political parties, professional and student organizations, educational institutions and religious groups.

In May 2011, a union of all Albanians in Switzerland was founded in Bern. The Albanian umbrella organization could function as a lobby for Albanians from all Albanian areas in the Balkans.

== Notable people ==
Selected people:

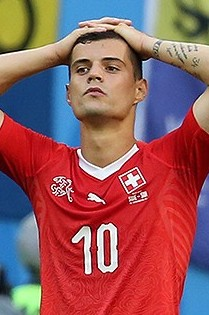
Granit Xhaka

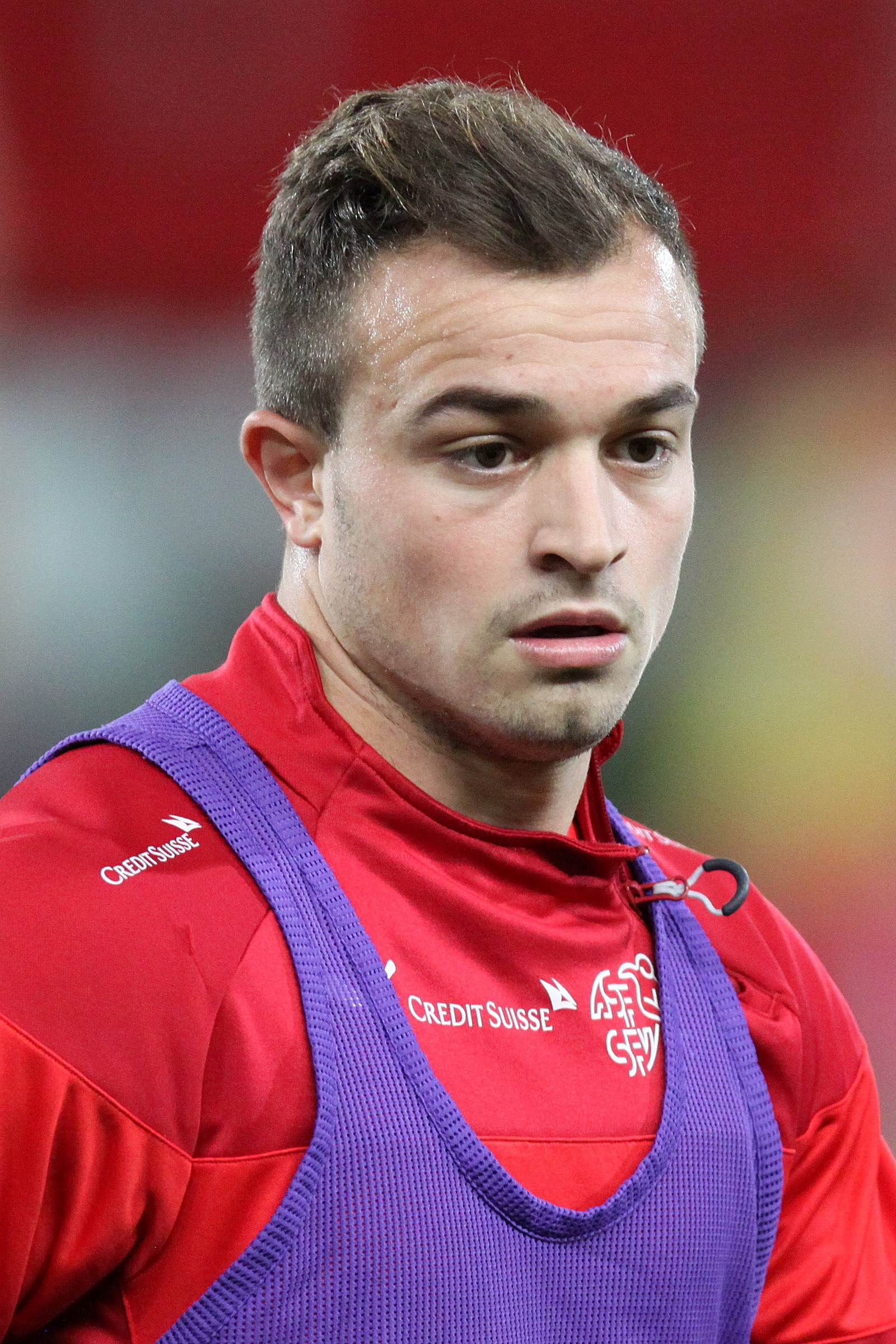
Xherdan Shaqiri

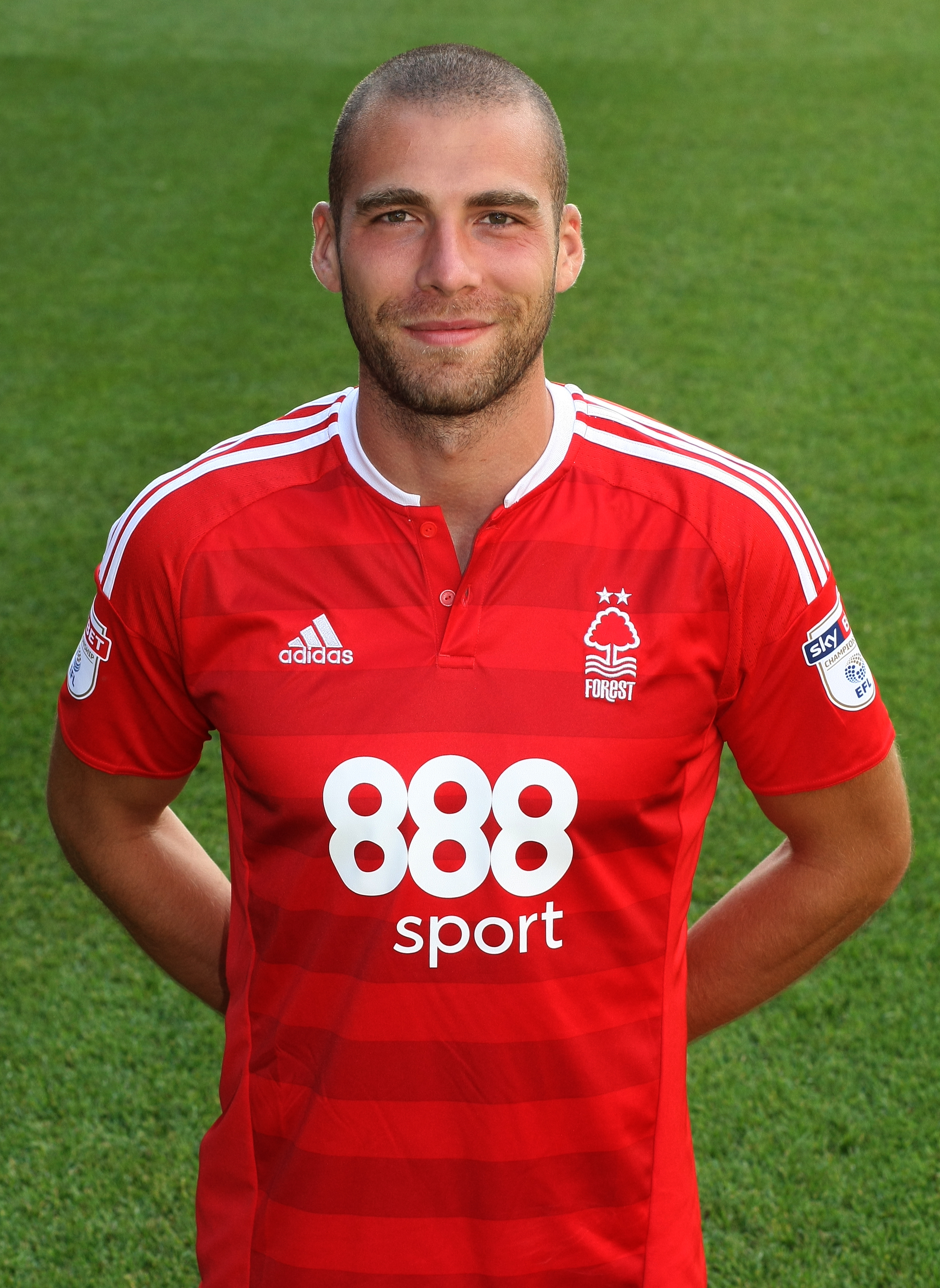
Pajtim Kasami

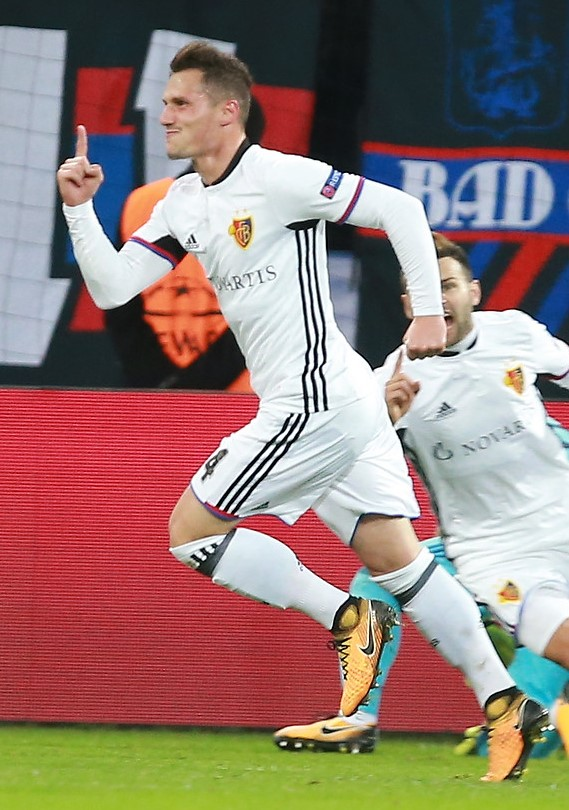
Taulant Xhaka

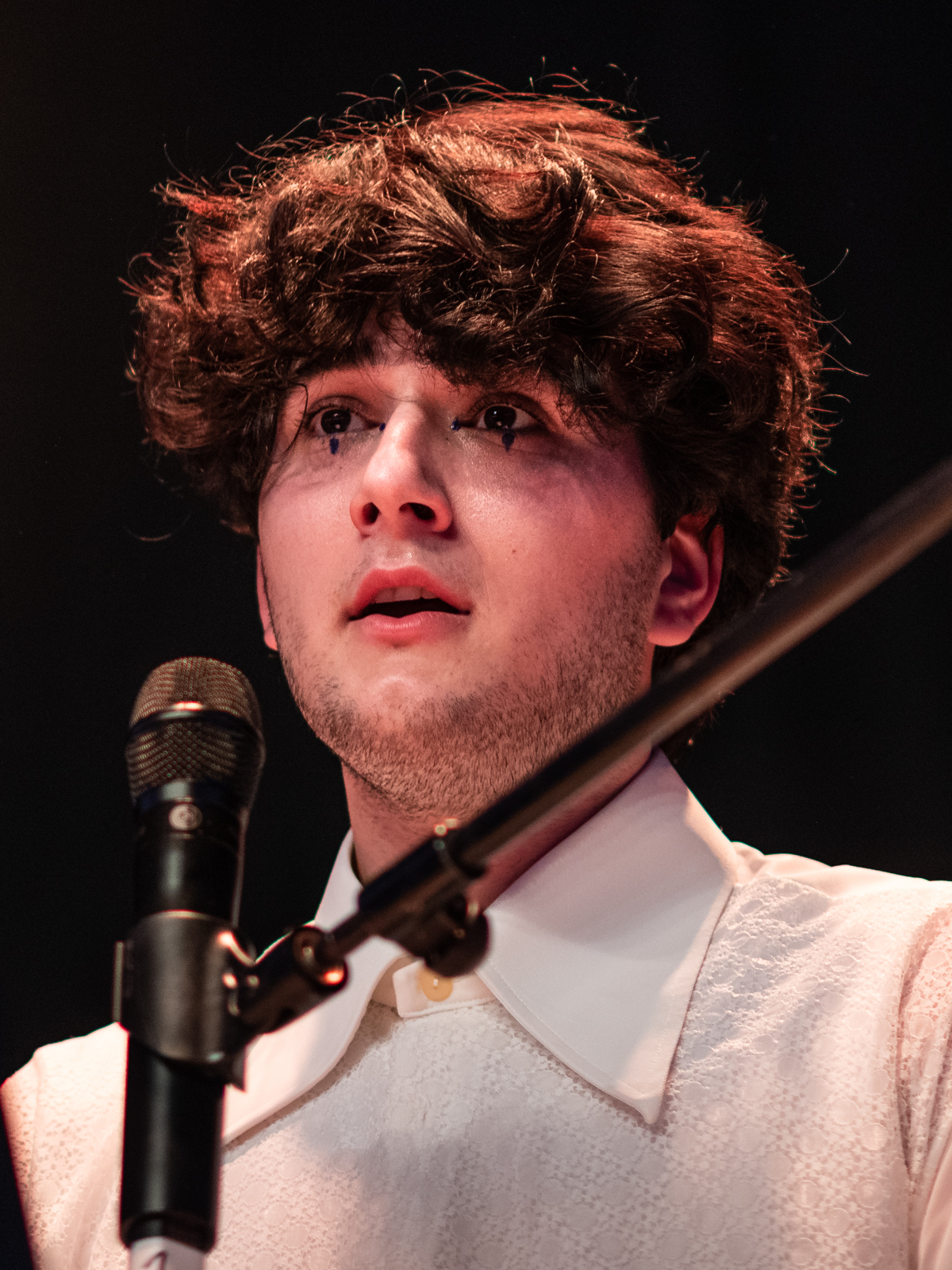
Gjon's Tears

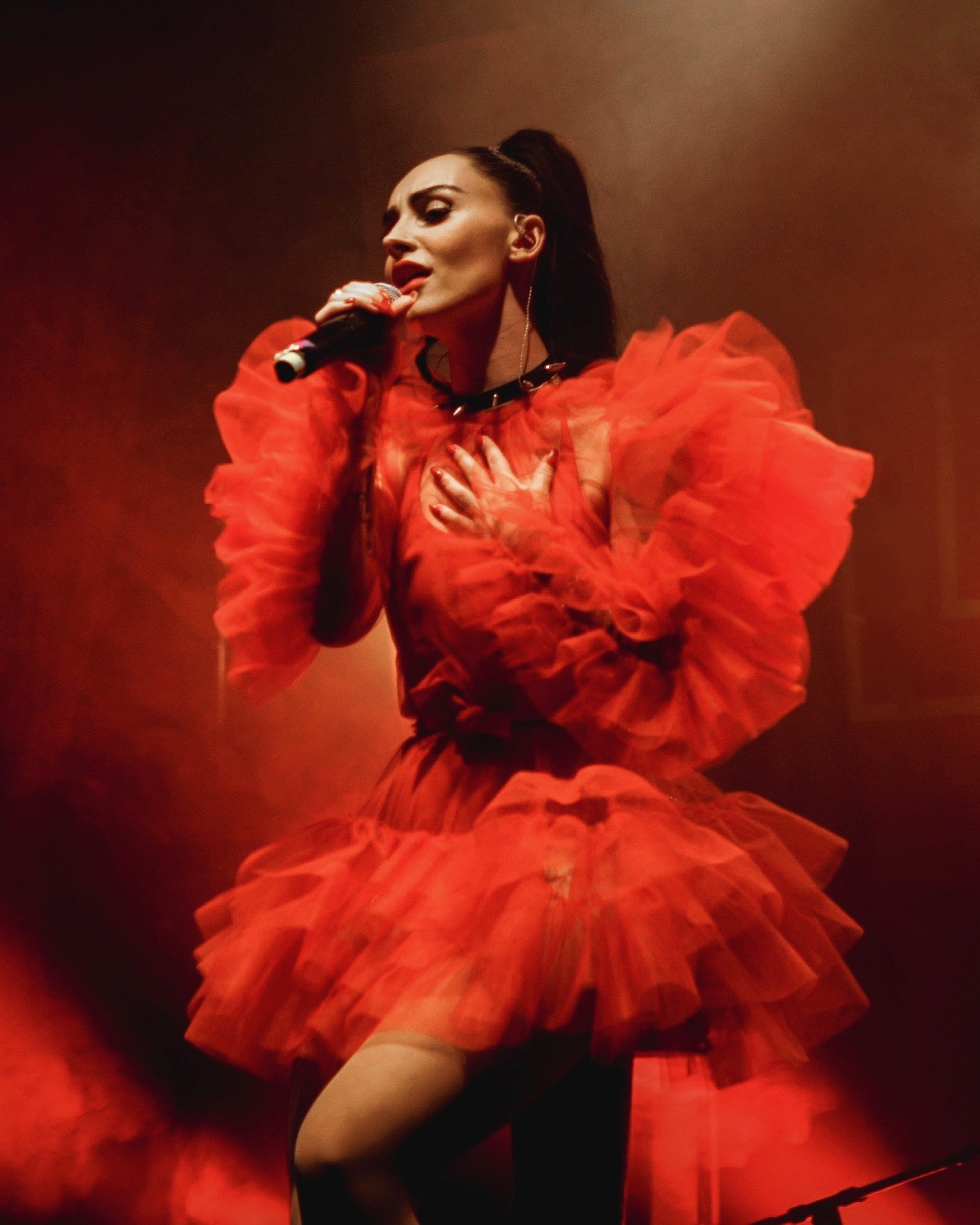
Ilira

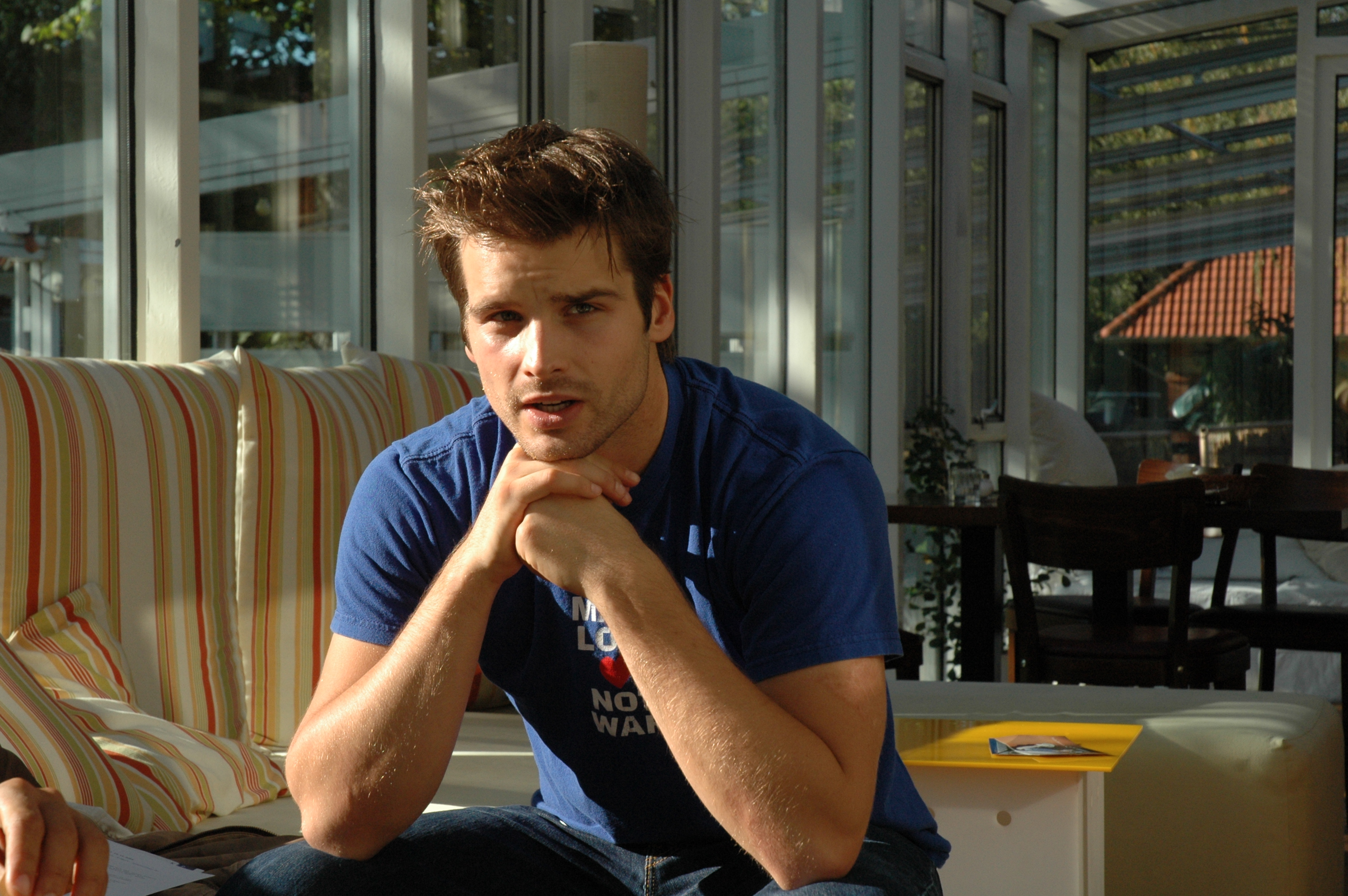
Patrick Nuo

== See also ==
- Immigration to Switzerland
- Albanian diaspora
- Albanians in Austria
- Albanians in France
- Albanians in Germany
- Albanians in Italy
