= Jonas Weik =

German footballer

Personal information
- Date of birth: 31 March 2000 (age 26)
- Place of birth: Schwetzingen, Germany
- Height: 1.76 m (5 ft 9 in)
- Position: Midfielder

Team information
- Current team: VfR Mannheim
- Number: 31

Youth career
- SpVgg Ketsch
- –2015: Waldhof Mannheim
- 2015–2017: 1899 Hoffenheim
- 2017–2018: Waldhof Mannheim

Senior career*
Years	Team	Apps	(Gls)
2018–2020	Waldhof Mannheim	5	(0)
2020–2022	Astoria Walldorf	55	(6)
2020	Astoria Walldorf II	3	(1)
2022–2023	VfB Stuttgart II	31	(1)
2023–2025	SV Sandhausen	44	(0)
2026	VSG Altglienicke	15	(0)
2026–	VfR Mannheim	6	(0)
- * Club domestic league appearances and goals as of 24 September 2026

Jonas Weik (born 21 March 2000) is a German professional footballer who plays as a midfielder for VfR Mannheim. He has previously played in the 3. Liga with Waldhof Mannheim.

== Career ==
On 31 August 2023, Weik signed with SV Sandhausen in 3. Liga.
