= Alessandro Goracuchi =

Giovanni Alessandro de Goracuchi Alexander Ritter von Goracuchi
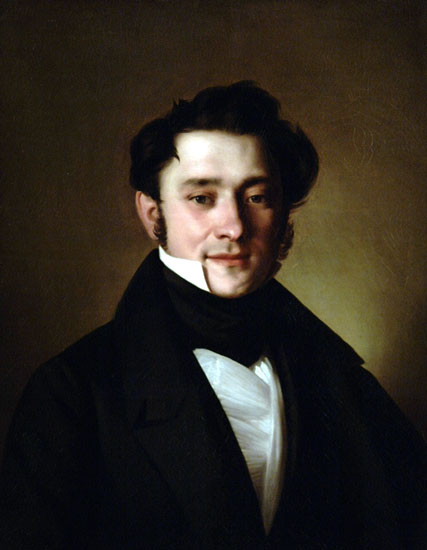
- Born: January 27, 1807; Trieste
- Died: February 3, 1887 (aged 80); Trieste
- Other name: Alexander Gurakuqi
- Occupations: Doctor and author
- Years active: 1820-1885
- Known for: Having published several books

Giovanni-Alessandro Goracuchi (German: Alexander Goracuchi, Albanian: Aleksander Gurakuqi; b. Trieste, January 27, 1807 – d. Trieste, February 3, 1887) was a scientist, doctor and diplomat in 19th-century Austrian Istria. He was born to a Catholic Albanian family. His published works are mostly written in Italian but also in French, German and other languages. He frequently sailed as a ship's surgeon in various journeys and expeditions. Goracuchi was also involved in the political affairs of Ottoman Shkodra (from where his family descended) as a representative of Austria-Hungary. He was knighted by Austria-Hungary and became known as Rittern von Goracuchi or in Italian Cavaliere de Goracuchi.

== Publications ==
- Strenna per l'anno 1849.
- Dell'acqua comune e di mare. Premessi alcuni cenni sulla forza medicatrice della natura. Stud.
