= Dukagjin Karanezi =

Austrian-Albanian footballer

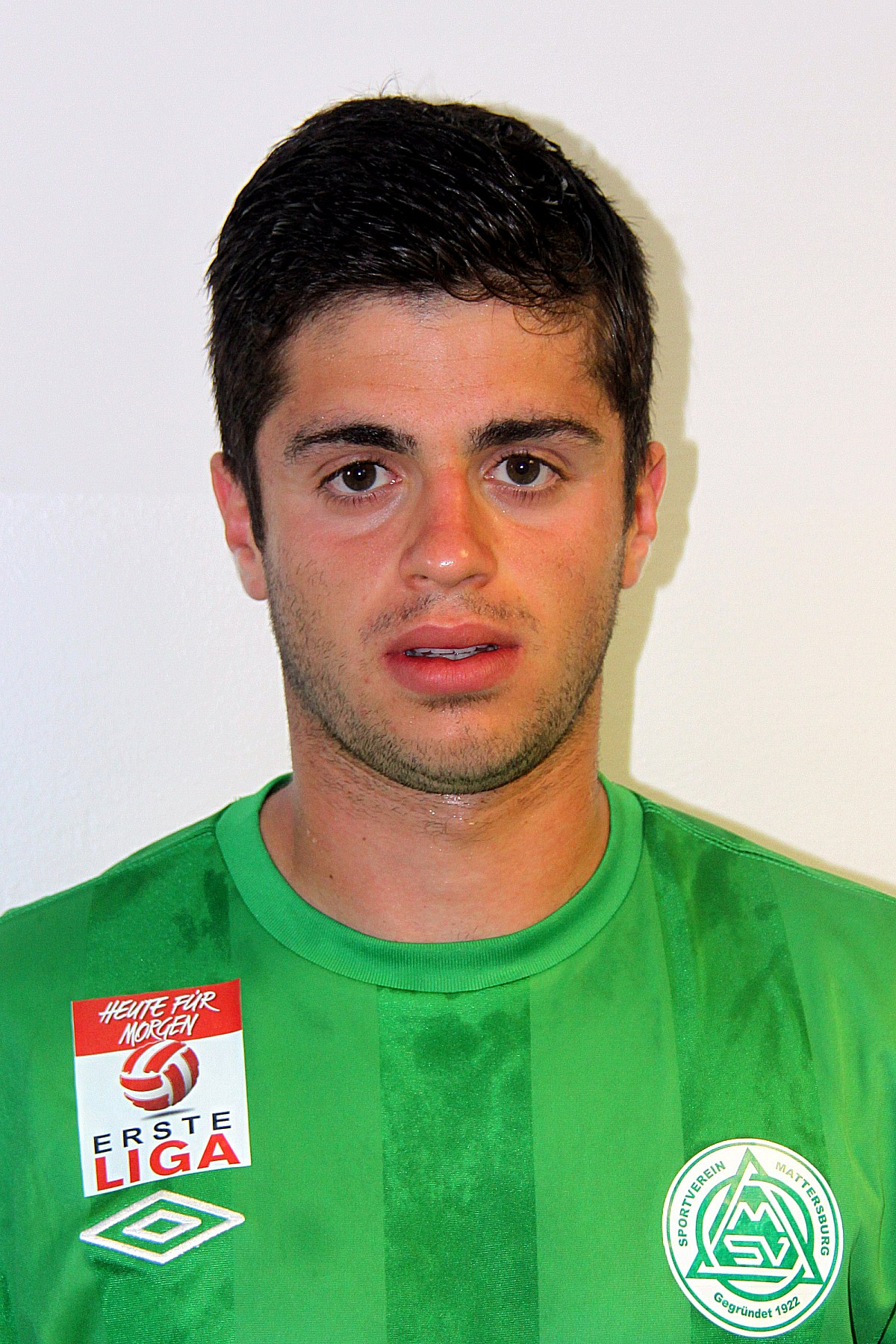
- Karanezi with SV Mattersburg in 2013

Personal information
- Full name: Dukagjin Karanezi
- Date of birth: 11 June 1993 (age 33)
- Place of birth: Linz, Austria
- Height: 1.76 m (5 ft 9 in)
- Position: Left-back

Team information
- Current team: SC Ritzing
- Number: 8

Youth career
- –2001: BNZ Burgenland
- 2001–2007: SV Mattersburg
- 2007–2009: AKA Burgenland

Senior career*
Years	Team	Apps	(Gls)
2009–2019	SV Mattersburg II	50	(1)
2013–2015	SV Mattersburg	16	(0)
2019–2021	SV Forchtenstein	17	(0)
2021	ASV Steinbrunn	0	(0)
2021–2022	MSV 2020	26	(3)
2022–	SC Ritzing	2	(0)

Managerial career
- 2016–2021: SV Mattersburg (youth)
- 2020–2022: MSV 2020 (youth)
- * Club domestic league appearances and goals as of 5 August 2022

Dukagjin Karanezi (born 11 June 1993) is an Austrian professional football player and manager, who plays as a left-back for Landesliga Burgenland club SC Ritzing.
