= Luca Stellwagen =

German footballer

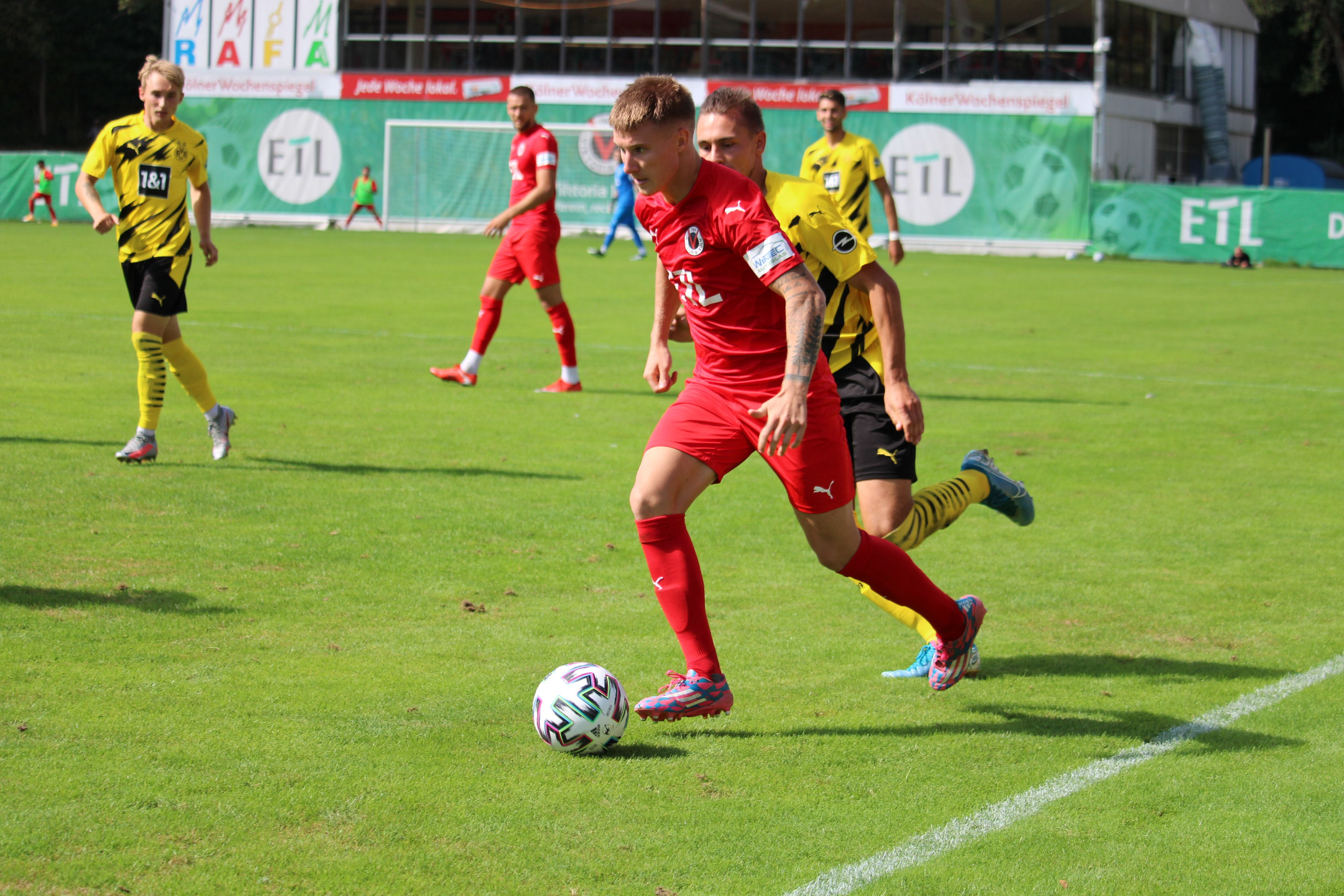
- Stellwagen for Viktoria Köln

Personal information
- Date of birth: 10 December 1998 (age 27)
- Place of birth: Ludwigshafen, Germany
- Height: 1.79 m (5 ft 10 in)
- Positions: Left midfielder; left-back

Team information
- Current team: VfR Mannheim
- Number: 17

Youth career
- –2012: Phönix Schifferstadt
- 2012–2015: Mainz 05
- 2015–2018: SV Sandhausen
- 2018–2019: Astoria Walldorf

Senior career*
Years	Team	Apps	(Gls)
2019–2020	Astoria Walldorf	22	(1)
2020–2021	Viktoria Köln	13	(0)
2021–2023	SC Verl	52	(1)
2024–2025	SGV Freiberg	37	(0)
2025	Kickers Offenbach	14	(0)
2026–	VfR Mannheim	12	(0)
- * Club domestic league appearances and goals as of 30 June 2026

Luca Stellwagen (born 10 December 1998) is a German professional footballer who plays as a left midfielder or left-back for VfR Mannheim.
