= 2024–25 SK Austria Klagenfurt season =

SK Austria Klagenfurt
2024–25 season
- Manager: Peter Pacult
- Stadium: Wörthersee Stadion
- Austrian Football Bundesliga: 10th
- Austrian Cup: Third round
- Top goalscorer: League: Ben Bobzien (9); All: Ben Bobzien (12)
- Highest home attendance: 6,645 17 August 2024 vs. Sturm Graz
- Lowest home attendance: 3,115 31 August 2024 vs. Blau-Weiß Linz
- Average home league attendance: 4,384
- Biggest win: 5–0 26 July 2024 vs. SV Gloggnitz; 27 August 2024 vs. ASV Siegendorf
- Biggest defeat: 7–0 23 November 2024 vs. Sturm Graz
- All statistics correct as of 25 February 2025.

The 2024–25 season is the 18th season in the history of SK Austria Klagenfurt, and the club's fourth consecutive season in Austrian Football Bundesliga. In addition to the domestic league, the team is scheduled to participate in the Austrian Cup.

== Transfers ==
=== In ===
Pos.	Player	Transferred from	Fee	Date	Source
MF	(Austria) Tobias Koch	(Austria) Blau-Weiß Linz	Free	1 July 2024 (Note: This transfer was announced on April 17, and would become official on July 1 once his Blau-Weiß Linz contract expired)	
GK	(Austria) Simon Spari	(Austria) FAC	Free	1 July 2024 (Note: This transfer was announced on April 30, and would become official on July 1 once his FAC contract expired)	
MF	(South Korea) Lee Min-young	(South Korea) Yonsei University	Free	1 July 2024 (Note: This transfer was announced on May 23, and would become official on July 1 once the transfer window opened)	
DF	(Germany) Jonas Kühn	(Germany) Viktoria Berlin	Undisclosed	1 July 2024 (Note: This transfer was announced on May 31, and would become official on July 1 once the transfer window opened)	
FW	(Germany) Ben Bobzien	(Germany) Mainz 05	Loan	1 July 2024 (Note: This transfer was announced on June 20, and would become official on July 1 once the transfer window opened)	
MF	(Austria) Philipp Wydra	(Austria) SK Rapid Wien	Loan	1 July 2024 (Note: This transfer was announced on June 21, and would become official on July 1 once the transfer window opened)	
DF	(Austria) Niklas Szerencsi	(Austria) SV Kapfenberg	Free	1 July 2024 (Note: This transfer was announced on June 23, and would become official on July 1 once his SV Kapfenberg contract expired)	
MF	(Togo) Dikeni Salifou	(Germany) Werder Bremen	Loan	26 August 2024	
DF	(Netherlands) Denzel Owusu	Unattached	Free	12 November 2024	
DF	(Austria) Martin Hinteregger	Unattached	Free	1 January 2025 (Note: This transfer was announced on November 26, and would become official on January 1 once the transfer window opened)	
MF	(England) Keanan Bennetts	Unattached	Free	5 January 2025	
MF	(United States) Steven Juncaj	(Slovenia) Mura	Free	6 January 2025	
MF	(Austria) Aaron Sky Schwarz	(Austria) SK Rapid Wien	Loan	10 January 2025	
GK	(Croatia) Ivan Kesina	Unattached	Free	26 January 2025	

=== Out ===
Pos.	Player	Transferred to	Fee	Date	Source
GK	(Germany) Phillip Menzel	(Germany) 1. FC Saarbrücken	Free	9 May 2024	
DF	(Germany) Till Schumacher	(Germany) 1. FC Saarbrücken	Free	4 June 2024	
MF	(Germany) Rico Benatelli	(Germany) Waldhof Mannheim	Free	19 June 2024	
FW	(Germany) Sinan Karweina	(Switzerland) FC Luzern	Free	22 June 2024	
DF	(Austria) Nicolas Wimmer	(Austria) Wolfsberger AC	Free	22 June 2024	
FW	(Croatia) Anton Maglica		End of contract	1 July 2024	
GK	(Austria) David Puntigam	(Austria) Kapfenberger SV	Free	26 July 2024	
FW	(Germany) Jonas Arweiler	(Germany) SC Verl	Free	30 July 2024	
MF	(Austria) Fabio Markelic	(Slovenia) NK Tolmin	Free	15 August 2024	
MF	(Germany) Moritz Berg	(Germany) Viktoria Berlin	Free	15 August 2024	
FW	(United States) Sebastian Soto		Contract terminated	22 October 2024	
DF	(Serbia) Nikola Đorić	(Lithuania) Hegelmann	End of contract	15 January 2025	
GK	(Croatia) Ivan Kesina	(Germany) Viktoria Berlin	Loan	27 January 2025	

== Friendlies ==
=== Pre-season ===
July 2024 Friendly	(Austria)	v	(Austria)

== Competitions ==
=== Overall record ===
Competition	First match	Last match	Starting round	Record							
Competition	First match	Last match	Starting round	Pld	W	D	L	GF	GA	GD	Win %
Austrian Football Bundesliga	3 August 2024		Matchday 1	16	4	3	9	14	35	−21	25.00
Austrian Cup	26 July 2024		First round	3	2	1	0	12	2	+10	66.67
Total				19	6	4	9	26	37	−11	31.58

Last updated: 25 January 2025
Source: Soccerway

=== Austrian Football Bundesliga ===
==== League table ====
Pos	Team	Pld	W	D	L	GF	GA	GD	Pts	Qualification
7	LASK	22	9	4	9	32	33	−1	31	Qualification for the Relegation round
8	TSV Hartberg	22	6	8	8	24	31	−7	26	Qualification for the Relegation round
9	Austria Klagenfurt	22	5	6	11	22	44	−22	21	Qualification for the Relegation round
10	WSG Tirol	22	4	7	11	20	31	−11	19	Qualification for the Relegation round
11	Grazer AK	22	3	7	12	27	45	−18	16	Qualification for the Relegation round

Source: Austrian Football Bundesliga
Rules for classification: 1) Points; 2) Head-to-head record; 3) Goal difference; 4) Goals scored; 5) Matches won; 6) Away matches won; 7) Away goals scored.

==== Results summary ====
Overall								Home						Away					
Pld	W	D	L	GF	GA	GD	Pts	W	D	L	GF	GA	GD	W	D	L	GF	GA	GD
16	4	3	9	14	35	−21	15	2	2	3	8	11	−3	2	1	6	6	24	−18

Last updated: 14 December 2024.
Source: ADMIRAL Bundesliga

==== Results by round ====
Round	1	2	3	4	5	7	8	9	10	11	12	13	14	15	16	6^{1}	17	18	19
Ground	A	H	H	A	H	H	A	A	H	A	H	A	A	H	A	A	H	A	H
Result	L	D	L	W	W	D	W	L	L	D	W	L	L	L	L	L	D	D	W
Position	12	11	12	8	6	8	8	6	8	9	9	7	9	9	10	10	10	10	9

Source: ADMIRAL Bundesliga
A = Away; H = Home; W = Win; D = Draw; L = Loss
Notes:
- ^{1} Matchday 6 (vs. Red Bull Salzburg) was postponed due to pitch conditions

==== Matches ====
3 August 2024 1	Wolfsberg	4–1	Austria Klagenfurt	Wolfsberg
19:30	Scherzer (yellow card) 4'; Ballo 11'; Piesinger 21'; Zukić 23'; Jašić (yellow card) 73'; Baumgartner 78'	Report	Robatsch (yellow card) 68'; Dehl 82'; Toshevski (yellow card) 86'	Stadium: Lavanttal-Arena; Attendance: 4,838; Referee: Christian-Petru Ciochirca

11 August 2024 2	Austria Klagenfurt	1–1	Rapid Wien	Klagenfurt
17:00	Bobzien 4'; Cvetko (yellow card) 31'; Wernitznig (yellow card) 45+2'; Mahrer (red card) 47'; Straudi (yellow card) 66'; Wydra (yellow card) 80'	Report	Oswald 18'; Grgić (yellow card) 28'; Böckle (yellow card) 73'; Burgstaller (yellow card) 90+3'; Auer (yellow card) 90+9'	Stadium: Wörthersee Stadion; Attendance: 6,054; Referee: Arnes Talic

17 August 2024 3	Austria Klagenfurt	0–2	Sturm Graz	Klagenfurt
17:00	Robatsch (yellow card) 1'; Wernitznig (yellow card) 11'	Report	Wüthrich (yellow card) 23'; Kiteishvili 71' (pen.); Stanković (yellow card) 81'; Biereth (yellow card) 86', (goal) 90+8'	Stadium: Wörthersee Stadion; Attendance: 6,645; Referee: Alan Kijas

24 August 2024 4	Tirol	0–1	Austria Klagenfurt	Wattens
17:00	Lawrence (yellow card) 9'	Report	Bobzien (yellow card) 30'; Szerencsi (yellow card) 40'; Gezos (yellow card) 50'; Toshevski 66'; Cvetko (yellow card) 80'	Stadium: Tivoli Stadion Tirol; Attendance: 1,930; Referee: Alain Sadikovski

31 August 2024 5	Austria Klagenfurt	3–1	Blau-Weiß Linz	Klagenfurt
17:00	Bobzien 13', (yellow card) 61'; Straudi (yellow card) 28'; Koch (yellow card) 35'; Binder 82'; Wydra 90'	Report	Strauss (red card) 18'; Goiginger (yellow card) 41'; Pirkl (yellow card) 44'; Ronivaldo 45+2', (yellow card) 59'; Seidl (yellow card) 81'	Stadium: Wörthersee Stadion; Attendance: 3,115; Referee: Julian Weinberger

21 September 2024 7	Austria Klagenfurt	2–2	Hartberg	Klagenfurt
17:00	Cvetko (yellow card) 36'; Gezos (yellow card) 64' (yellow-red card) 75'; Bobzien 69', 90+6' (pen.)	Report	Fillafer 5'; Marić (yellow card) 45+3'; Prokop (yellow card) 47'; Diarra (yellow card) 56'; Avdijaj (yellow card) 65'; Mijić (yellow card) 72', (goal) 78' (pen.); Hoffmann (yellow card) 90+3'; Sallinger (yellow card) 90+5'	Stadium: Wörthersee Stadion; Attendance: 3,433; Referee: Daniel Pfister

29 September 2024 8	Grazer AK	0–1	Austria Klagenfurt	Graz
17:00	Zaizen (yellow card) 86'; Cheukoua (yellow card) 88'; Dressel (yellow card) 90+5'	Report	Cvetko (yellow card) 29'; Robatsch 34'; Salifou (yellow card) 90+1'; Wernitznig (yellow card) 90+4'	Stadium: Merkur-Arena; Attendance: 6,967; Referee: Harald Lechner

6 October 2024 9	LASK	4–0	Austria Klagenfurt	Linz
14:30	Žulj 26'; Flecker (yellow card) 50'; Jovičić (yellow card) 54'; Entrup 56'; Robatsch 70' (o.g.); Mustapha 90'	Report		Stadium: Raiffeisen Arena; Attendance: 10,732; Referee: Christian-Petru Ciochirca

20 October 2024 10	Austria Klagenfurt	0–1	Austria Wien	Klagenfurt
14:30	Jaritz (yellow card) 17'; Straudi (yellow card) 69'; Szerencsi (yellow card) 87'	Report	Maybach (yellow card) 45'; Lucas Galvão (yellow card) 52'; Wiesinger (yellow card) 71'; Dragović (yellow card) 74'; Gruber 76'	Stadium: Wörthersee Stadion; Attendance: 3,974; Referee: Sebastian Gishamer

26 October 2024 11	SCR Altach	2–2	Austria Klagenfurt	Altach
17:00	Gugganig (yellow card) 5'; Fridrikas 19' (pen.); Koller (yellow card) 37', (goal) 72'; Ingolitsch (yellow card) 57'	Report	Robatsch (yellow card) 21'; Koch 24'; Bonnah (yellow card) 34'; Wernitznig 51'; Cvetko (yellow card) 70'; Bobzien (yellow card) 89'	Stadium: Stadion Schnabelholz; Attendance: 4,124; Referee: Jakob Semler

3 November 2024 12	Austria Klagenfurt	2–1	Wolfsberger AC	Klagenfurt
14:30	Bobzien 12' (pen.), 23' (pen.); Szerencsi (yellow card) 58'; Koch (yellow card) 90'	Report	Sabitzer (yellow card) 9'; Gattermayer (yellow card) 36'; Baumgartner (yellow card) 62'; Polster (yellow card) 64'; Altunashvili 70'; Nwaiwu (yellow card) 83'	Stadium: Wörthersee Stadion; Attendance: 5,233; Referee: Arnes Talic

10 November 2024 13	Rapid Wien	2–0	Austria Klagenfurt	Vienna
17:00	Burgstaller 12', (yellow card) 38'; Schaub 24'; Auer (yellow card) 55'; Böckle (yellow card) 90+1'	Report	Robatsch (yellow card) 29'; Straudi (yellow card) 45'; Cvetko (yellow card) 58'	Stadium: Allianz Stadion; Attendance: 17,584; Referee: Stefan Ebner

23 November 2024 14	Sturm Graz	7–0	Austria Klagenfurt	Graz
17:00	Bøving 9', 55'; Lavalée (yellow card) 23'; Jatta 32'; Gazibegović (yellow card) 36'; Biereth 38', 65'; Geyrhofer 40'; Aiwu (yellow card) 79'; Grgic 90+1'	Report	Toshevski (yellow card) 80'; Bonnah (yellow card) 82'	Stadium: Merkur-Arena; Attendance: 15,508; Referee: Josef Spurny

1 December 2024 15	Austria Klagenfurt	0–3	Tirol	Klagenfurt
14:30	Salifou (yellow card) 45+2'; Toshevski (yellow card) 86'; Mahrer (yellow card) 88'	Report	Jaunegg 6'; Hinterseer (yellow card) 30'; Taferner (yellow card) 34'; Müller 87' (pen.); Stejskal (yellow card) 90'; Anselm 90+4'	Stadium: Wörthersee Stadion; Attendance: 3,722; Referee: Safak Barmaksiz

8 December 2024 16	Blau-Weiß Linz	2–1	Austria Klagenfurt	Linz
14:30	Pasic (yellow card) 22'; Ronivaldo 39' (pen.), 67'; Briedl (yellow card) 63'	Report	Cvetko (yellow card) 14'; Bobzien 23' (pen.), (yellow card) 72'; Straudi (yellow card) 82'	Stadium: Donauparkstadion; Attendance: 4,817; Referee: Jakob Semler

14 December 2024 6	Red Bull Salzburg	3–0	Austria Klagenfurt	Wals-Siezenheim
17:00	Gloukh 41'; Nene 44'; Clark 74'	Report	Kitz (yellow card) 10'; Robatsch (yellow card) 65'	Stadium: Red Bull Arena; Attendance: 10,987; Referee: Alain Sadikovski

9 February 2025 17	Austria Klagenfurt	0–0	Red Bull Salzburg	Klagenfurt
14:30	Gkezos (yellow card) 50'; Koch (yellow card) 66'	Report	Capaldo (yellow card) 10'; Bidstrup (yellow card) 87'	Stadium: Wörthersee Stadion; Attendance: 5,659; Referee: Safak Barmaksiz

16 February 2025 18	Hartberg	1–1	Austria Klagenfurt	Hartberg
14:30	Diarra (yellow card) 14'; Husković 85'	Report	Hinteregger (yellow card) 41'; Gkezos 69'; Koch (yellow card) 85'; Cvetko (yellow card) 90+3'	Stadium: Profertil Arena Hartberg; Referee: Harald Lechner

22 February 2025 19	Austria Klagenfurt	4–2	Grazer AK	Klagenfurt
17:00	Wernitznig 12'; Cvetko (yellow card) 34'; Gkezos (yellow card) 58'; Salifou 60'; Bobzien 78', 90+4' (pen.)	Report	Fofana (yellow card) 27'; Schriebl (yellow card) 56' (yellow-red card) 90+2'; Maderner 62'; Kreuzriegler (yellow card) 64'; Jano 73'; Kleinheisler (yellow card) 77'	Stadium: Wörthersee Stadion; Referee: Sebastian Gishamer

2 March 2025 20	Austria Klagenfurt	1–2	LASK	Klagenfurt
14:30	Bonnah 3'; Koch (yellow card) 48'; Toshevski (yellow card) 90'	Report	Berisha 14'; Bello (yellow card) 36'; Adeniran (yellow card) 48'; Ziereis (yellow card) 57'; Entrup 61', (yellow card) 72'	Stadium: Wörthersee Stadion; Attendance: 3,380; Referee: Florian Jäger

9 March 2025 21	Austria Wien	2–0	Austria Klagenfurt	Vienna
17:00	Fitz 15', (yellow card) 25'; Malone 20'; Lucas Galvão (yellow card) 59'; Perez Vinlöf (yellow card) 61'; Fischer (yellow card) 90+4'	Report	Salifou (yellow card) 16'; Bennetts (yellow card) 40'	Stadium: Franz Horr Stadium; Referee: Christian-Petru Ciochirca

16 March 2025 22	Austria Klagenfurt	2–2	SCR Altach	Klagenfurt
17:00	Toshevski 5'; Cvetko (yellow card) 32'; Wydra 90+6'	Report	Kameri 11'; Robatsch 13' (o.g.); Estrada (yellow card) 72'; Dietz (yellow card) 90+7'; Jäger (yellow card) 90+8' (yellow-red card) 90+9'	Stadium: Wörthersee Stadion; Referee: Alexander Harkam

==== League table ====
Pos	Team	Pld	W	D	L	GF	GA	GD	Pts	Qualification
2	TSV Hartberg	32	11	11	10	40	40	0	31	Qualification for the Conference League play-offs
3	WSG Tirol	32	7	9	16	35	50	−15	20	
4	Grazer AK	32	5	13	14	34	54	−20	20	
5	Rheindorf Altach	32	5	11	16	29	46	−17	18	
6	Austria Klagenfurt (R)	32	6	9	17	33	70	−37	16	Relegation to Austrian Football Second League

Source: Austrian Football Bundesliga
Rules for classification: 1) Points; 2) Points with (possible) half points subtracted due to rounding; 3) Head-to-head points; 4) Head-to-head goal difference; 5) Head-to-head goals scored; 6) Goal difference; 7) Goals scored; 8) Matches won; 9) Away matches won; 10) Away goals scored.
(R) Relegated

==== Results by round ====
Round	1
Ground	
Result	
Position	

Source: Austrian Football Bundesliga
A = Away; H = Home; W = Win; D = Draw; L = Loss

==== Matches ====
29 March 2025 23	Hartberg	2–3	Austria Klagenfurt	Hartberg
17:00	Avdijaj 13'; Prokop (yellow card) 54'; Mijić 71'; Komposch (yellow card) 90+1'	Report	Toshevski 45+2', 64', 84'; Gkezos (yellow card) 52'; Salifou (yellow card) 57'; Wernitznig (yellow card) 78'	Stadium: Profertil Arena Hartberg; Attendance: 1,643; Referee: Isa Simsek

5 April 2025 24	Austria Klagenfurt	2–3	SCR Altach	Klagenfurt
17:00	Salifou 2', (yellow card) 73'; Cvetko 29'; Bobzien (yellow card) 60'; Jaritz (yellow card) 82'; Wydra (yellow card) 89'	Report	Mustapha 15'; Koller 40'; Fridrikas 49'; Ingolitsch (yellow card) 54'; Fadinger (yellow card) 90+3'	Stadium: Wörthersee Stadion; Attendance: 3,001; Referee: Walter Altmann

12 April 2025 25	Tirol	5–3	Austria Klagenfurt	Wattens
17:00	Müller 22'; Skrbo 26', 58'; Diarra 48'; Butler (yellow card) 61'; Naschberger 69'; Ranacher (yellow card) 90'	Report	Robatsch (yellow card) 38'; Mahrer (yellow card) 47'; Wernitznig 55', 90+3'; Binder 89'	Stadium: Tivoli Stadion Tirol; Attendance: 850; Referee: Christian-Petru Ciochirca

19 April 2025 26	Austria Klagenfurt	0–0	Grazer AK	Klagenfurt
17:00	Wernitznig (yellow card) 51'; Hinteregger (yellow card) 62'; Mahrer (yellow card) 83'	Report	Fofana (yellow card) 65'; Tikvić (yellow card) 76'	Stadium: Wörthersee Stadion; Attendance: 3,833; Referee: Harald Lechner

22 April 2025 27	Austria Klagenfurt	1–4	LASK	Klagenfurt
20:30	Toshevski 31'	Report	Horvath 12'; Entrup 15', 54'; Coulibaly (yellow card) 57'; Flecker 84'	Stadium: Wörthersee Stadion; Attendance: 2,913; Referee: Julian Weinberger

26 April 2025 28	LASK	6–0	Austria Klagenfurt	Linz
17:00	Horvath 27'; Flecker 42'; Entrup 60'; Coulibaly 66'; Žulj 73'; Andrade (yellow card) 76'; Adeniran 84'	Report	Bennetts (yellow card) 50'; Koch (yellow card) 59'; Cvetko (yellow card) 68'	Stadium: Raiffeisen Arena; Referee: Alexander Harkam

2 May 2025 29	Grazer AK	1–1	Austria Klagenfurt	Graz
19:30	Maderner 34'; Fofana (yellow card) 84'	Report	Koch (yellow card) 27'; Binder 37'; Kitz (red card) 49'; Hinteregger (yellow card) 84'	Stadium: Merkur-Arena; Attendance: 8,352; Referee: Arnes Talic

10 May 2025 30	Austria Klagenfurt	1–4	Tirol	Klagenfurt
17:00	Cvetko 15'; Salifou (yellow card) 37'; Koch (yellow card) 41'; Bobzien (yellow card) 78'; Jaritz (yellow card) 90+7'	Report	Müller 43' (pen.); Blume 48'; Gugganig 51'; Škrbo (yellow card) 61'; David (yellow card) 62'; Diarra 90+1'	Stadium: Wörthersee Stadion; Attendance: 6,721; Referee: Stefan Ebner

17 May 2025 31	SCR Altach	0–0	Austria Klagenfurt	Altach
17:00	Bähre (yellow card) 81'; Gebauer (yellow card) 88'; Diawara (yellow card) 90+1'; Gugganig (yellow card) 90+3'	Report	Hinteregger (yellow card) 36'; Kitz (yellow card) 75'; Gkezos (yellow card) 78'	Stadium: Stadion Schnabelholz; Attendance: 7,929; Referee: Julian Weinberger

23 May 2025 32	Austria Klagenfurt	0–1	Hartberg	Klagenfurt
19:30	Straudi (yellow card) 6'; Salifou (yellow card) 25'; Szerencsi (yellow card) 60'	Report	Havel 2'; Kovacevic (yellow card) 84'; Hofer (yellow card) 88'	Stadium: Wörthersee Stadion; Attendance: 5,121; Referee: Sebastian Gishamer

=== Austrian Cup ===
26 July 2024 First round	SV Gloggnitz	0–5	Austria Klagenfurt	Gloggnitz
19:00	Rosenbichler (yellow card) 65'; Haller (yellow card) 88'	Report	Toshevski 19'; Binder 23'; Cvetko 30'; Bobzien 39', 70'; Koch (yellow card) 47'; Szerencsi (yellow card) 51'	Stadium: Krammer-Arena; Attendance: 1,700; Referee: Safak Barmaksiz

27 August 2024 Second round	ASV Siegendorf	0–5	Austria Klagenfurt	Siegendorf
19:00	Aussenegg (yellow card) 16'; Tercek (yellow card) 53'; Schilhan (yellow card) 64'	Report	Binder 14'; Wernitznig 18'; Bobzien 27'; Szerencsi (yellow card) 70'; Toshevski 79', 90'	Stadium: Sportpark Siegendorf; Attendance: 724; Referee: Josef Spurny

30 October 2024 Third round	Wolfsberger AC	2–2 (a.e.t.) (9–8 p)	Austria Klagenfurt	Wolfsberg
20:30	Gütlbauer (yellow card) 14'; Baumgartner (yellow card) 14'; Agyemang (yellow card) 50'; Sabitzer (yellow card) 67', (goal) 70'; Ballo 95'; Omić (yellow card) 118'	Report	Toshevski 15', (yellow card) 21'; Dehl (yellow card) 63'; Robatsch (yellow card) 90+1', (goal) 112'	Stadium: Lavanttal-Arena; Attendance: 2,651; Referee: Safak Barmaksiz
	Penalties
	Jašić (penalty missed); Omić (penalty scored); Baumgartner (penalty scored); Altunashvili (penalty scored); Piesinger (penalty scored); Karamoko (penalty scored); Matic (penalty scored); Ballo (penalty scored); Ullmann (penalty scored); Wimmer (penalty scored)		Bobzien (penalty scored); Cvetko (penalty missed); Wernitznig (penalty scored); Binder (penalty scored); Jaritz (penalty scored); Szerencsi (penalty scored); Mahrer (penalty scored); Straudi (penalty scored); Dehl (penalty scored); Robatsch (penalty missed)

== Statistics ==
=== Appearances and goals ===
As of match played 22 February 2025

Players with no appearances are not included on the list
Italics indicate a loaned in player

No.	Pos	Nat	Player	Total		Bundesliga		Austrian Cup	
No.	Pos	Nat	Player	Apps	Goals	Apps	Goals	Apps	Goals
1	GK	(Austria) AUT	Marco Knaller	6	0	5+0	0	1+0	0
2	DF	(Netherlands) NED	Solomon Bonnah	22	1	8+11	1	3+0	0
6	MF	(Austria) AUT	Tobias Koch	22	1	19+0	1	3+0	0
7	MF	(Austria) AUT	Florian Jaritz	19	0	13+4	0	0+2	0
8	DF	(Greece) GRE	Kosmas Gkezos	13	1	9+2	1	1+1	0
9	FW	(Austria) AUT	Nicholas Binder	22	3	10+9	1	2+1	2
10	FW	(North Macedonia) MKD	David Toshevski	18	6	9+6	2	2+1	4
11	MF	(Germany) GER	Keanan Bennetts	5	0	2+3	0	0+0	0
13	DF	(Austria) AUT	Martin Hinteregger	6	0	6+0	0	0+0	0
14	MF	(Austria) AUT	Christopher Cvetko	23	1	19+1	0	2+1	1
17	MF	(Italy) ITA	Simon Straudi	17	0	12+3	0	0+2	0
18	MF	(Togo) TOG	Dikeni Salifou	20	1	15+3	1	1+1	0
19	DF	(Austria) AUT	Niklas Szerencsi	17	0	13+1	0	3+0	0
23	FW	(Austria) AUT	Dino Delic	1	0	0+1	0	0+0	0
24	MF	(Austria) AUT	Christopher Wernitznig	24	3	16+5	2	1+2	1
27	DF	(Germany) GER	Jonas Kühn	11	0	8+0	0	3+0	0
29	MF	(Germany) GER	Laurenz Dehl	13	1	1+9	1	1+2	0
30	GK	(Austria) AUT	Simon Spari	19	0	17+0	0	2+0	0
31	DF	(Austria) AUT	Thorsten Mahrer	21	0	19+0	0	2+0	0
34	DF	(Austria) AUT	Jannik Robatsch	24	2	17+4	1	3+0	1
35	DF	(Austria) AUT	Matteo Kitz	7	0	1+6	0	0+0	0
36	DF	(Austria) AUT	Adem Mustafic	1	0	0+1	0	0+0	0
66	FW	(Austria) AUT	Tristan Schoppitsch	1	0	0+1	0	0+0	0
77	MF	(Germany) GER	Ben Bobzien	25	12	22+0	9	2+1	3
95	MF	(Austria) AUT	Philipp Wydra	20	2	1+16	2	1+2	0
