= 2023–24 SK Austria Klagenfurt (2007) season =

SK Austria Klagenfurt (2007)
2023–24 season
- Stadium: 28 Black Arena
- Austrian Football Bundesliga: 6th
- Austrian Cup: Third round
- Top goalscorer: League: Sinan Karweina (10); All: Sinan Karweina (13)

The 2023–24 SK Austria Klagenfurt (2007) season is the club's 116th season in existence and its second consecutive season in the top flight of Austrian football. In addition to the domestic league, SK Austria Klagenfurt (2007) will participate in this season's edition of the Austrian Cup and the UEFA Europa League. The season covers the period from 1 July 2023 to 30 June 2024.

== Players ==
=== First-team squad ===
: As of 18 April 2024[1]

Note: Flags indicate national team as defined under FIFA eligibility rules; some limited exceptions apply. Players may hold more than one non-FIFA nationality.

No.	Pos.	Nation	Player
1	GK	AUT	Marco Knaller
2	DF	NED	Solomon Bonnah
3	DF	AUT	Matthias Dollinger
4	DF	SRB	Nikola Đorić
5	MF	AUT	Bego Kujrakovic
6	MF	MAR	Ali Loune (on loan from Nürnberg)
7	FW	AUT	Florian Jaritz
8	MF	GRE	Kosmas Gezos
9	FW	AUT	Nicolas Binder
10	FW	GER	Sinan Karweina
11	FW	USA	Sebastian Soto
13	GK	GER	Phillip Menzel
14	MF	AUT	Christopher Cvetko
17	DF	ITA	Simon Straudi

No.	Pos.	Nation	Player
19	MF	SCO	Andy Irving (on loan from West Ham United)
20	MF	GER	Rico Benatelli
23	MF	GER	Max Besuschkow (on loan from Hannover 96)
24	MF	AUT	Christopher Wernitznig
30	GK	AUT	David Puntigam
31	DF	AUT	Thorsten Mahrer
33	DF	GER	Till Schumacher
34	DF	AUT	Jannik Robatsch
37	DF	AUT	Nicolas Wimmer
39	FW	GER	Jonas Arweiler
44	GK	AUT	Marcel Köstenbauer
77	FW	AUT	Aaron-Sky Schwarz (on loan from Rapid Wien)
92	MF	AUT	Fabio Markelic
99	FW	CRO	Anton Maglica

==== Out on loan ====
Note: Flags indicate national team as defined under FIFA eligibility rules; some limited exceptions apply. Players may hold more than one non-FIFA nationality.

No.	Pos.	Nation	Player
—	MF	GER	Moritz Berg (at Viktoria 1889 Berlin until 30 June 2024)
—	MF	GER	Laurenz Dehl (at Viktoria 1889 Berlin until 30 June 2024)

No.	Pos.	Nation	Player
—	MF	GER	Iba May (at Viktoria 1889 Berlin until 30 June 2024)
—	FW	MKD	David Toshevski (at Šibenik until 30 June 2024)

== Transfers ==
=== In ===
Pos.	Player	Transferred from	Fee	Date	Source
DF	(Austria) [[ ]]	(Austria) [[ ]]		1 July 2023	

=== Out ===
Pos.	Player	Transferred to	Fee	Date	Source
DF	(Austria) [[ ]]	(Austria) [[ ]]		1 July 2023	

== Pre-season and friendlies ==
Win Draw Loss Fixtures

11 July 2023 Friendly	Austria Klagenfurt	4–0	(Austria) Leoben
17:00 CEST (UTC+2)

19 July 2023 Friendly	ASKÖ Köttmannsdorf (Austria)	0–10	Austria Klagenfurt
18:30 CEST (UTC+2)

== Competitions ==
=== Overview ===
Competition	First match	Last match	Starting round	Final position	Record							
Competition	First match	Last match	Starting round	Final position	Pld	W	D	L	GF	GA	GD	Win %
Austrian Football Bundesliga	29 July 2023	19 May 2024	Matchday 1		26	8	12	6	32	35	−3	30.77
Austrian Cup	22 July 2023	1 November 2023	First round	Third round	3	2	0	1	6	3	+3	66.67
Total					29	10	12	7	38	38	+0	34.48

Last updated: 18 April 2024
Source: Soccerway

=== Austrian Football Bundesliga ===
==== League table ====
Pos	Team	Pld	W	D	L	GF	GA	GD	Pts	Qualification
2	Sturm Graz	22	13	7	2	37	15	+22	46	Qualification for the Championship round
3	LASK	22	9	8	5	26	18	+8	35	Qualification for the Championship round
4	Austria Klagenfurt	22	8	10	4	29	27	+2	34 (Note: Head to head points: Klagenfurt 4, TSV Hartberg 1.)	Qualification for the Championship round
5	Hartberg	22	9	7	6	33	28	+5	34	Qualification for the Championship round
6	Rapid Wien	22	8	9	5	38	21	+17	33 (Note: Head to head points: Rapid 4, Austria Wien 1.)	Qualification for the Championship round

Source: Austrian Football Bundesliga
Rules for classification: 1) Points; 2) Head-to-head record; 3) Goal difference; 4) Goals scored; 5) Matches won; 6) Away matches won; 7) Away goals scored.

==== Results summary ====
Overall								Home						Away					
Pld	W	D	L	GF	GA	GD	Pts	W	D	L	GF	GA	GD	W	D	L	GF	GA	GD
22	8	10	4	29	27	+2	34	3	6	2	14	15	−1	5	4	2	15	12	+3

Last updated: 18 April 2024.

==== Results by round ====
Round	1	2	3	4	5	6	7	8	9	10	11	12	13	14	15	16	17	18	19	20	21	22
Ground	A	H	A	H	A	A	H	H	A	H	A	H	A	H	A	H	H	A	A	H	A	H
Result	W	D	D	D	W	D	L	W	D	D	W	W	L	L	W	D	D	D	W	W	L	D
Position	2	3	3	4	3	4	5	4	4	5	4	4	5	5	5	5	5	5	5	4	4	4

Updated to match(es) played on 18 April 2024. Source: Soccerway
A = Away; H = Home; W = Win; D = Draw; L = Loss

==== Matches ====
The league fixtures were unveiled on 27 June 2023.

29 July 2023 1	WSG Tirol	1–3	Austria Klagenfurt	Innsbruck
16:00 CEST (UTC+2)	Kronberger 80'	Report	Karweina 10'; Irving 53', 90+7'	Stadium: Tivoli Stadion Tirol; Attendance: 1,742; Referee: Harald Lechner

9 August 2023 2	Austria Klagenfurt	2–2	Wolfsberger AC	Klagenfurt
19:30 CEST (UTC+2)	Cvetko 37'; Wernitznig 81'	Report	Omić 66'; Boakye 75'	Stadium: 28 Black Arena; Attendance: 7,852; Referee: Gerhard Grobelnik

12 August 2023 3	Sturm Graz	0–0	Austria Klagenfurt	Graz
16:00 CEST (UTC+2)		Report		Stadium: Merkur–Arena; Attendance: 13,328; Referee: Markus Hameter

19 August 2023 4	Austria Klagenfurt	1–1	Rheindorf Altach	Klagenfurt
18:30 CEST (UTC+2)	Karweina 52'	Report	Santos 84'	Stadium: 28 Black Arena; Attendance: 4,504; Referee: Daniel Pfister

27 August 2023 5	TSV Hartberg	0–3	Austria Klagenfurt	Hartberg
16:00 CEST (UTC+2)		Report	Irving 44'; Karweina 62', 90+4'	Stadium: Profertil Arena Hartberg; Attendance: 1,837; Referee: Alan Kijas

3 September 2023 6	Austria Wien	2–2	Austria Klagenfurt	Vienna
16:00 CEST (UTC+2)	Guenouche 3'; Gruber 90+1'	Report	Karweina 9'; Gezos 70'	Stadium: Generali Arena; Attendance: 13,435; Referee: Christian-Petru Ciochirca

16 September 2023 7	Austria Klagenfurt	1–3	LASK	Klagenfurt
16:00 CEST (UTC+2)	Bonnah 56'	Report	Ljubičić 36'; Flecker 40'; Havel 44'	Stadium: 28 Black Arena; Attendance: 3,800; Referee: Sebastian Gishamer

23 September 2023 8	Austria Klagenfurt	1–0	Austria Lustenau	Klagenfurt
16:00 CEST (UTC+2)	Anderson 21' (o.g.)	Report		Stadium: 28 Black Arena; Attendance: 2,749; Referee: Arnes Talic

30 September 2023 9	Blau-Weiß Linz	0–0	Austria Klagenfurt	Linz
16:00 CEST (UTC+2)		Report		Stadium: Hofmann Personal Stadion; Attendance: 4,656; Referee: Alan Kijas

8 October 2023 10	Austria Klagenfurt	2–2	Red Bull Salzburg	Klagenfurt
16:00 CEST (UTC+2)	Wimmer 45+1'; Jaritz 74'	Report	Šimić 8'; Forson 29'	Stadium: 28 Black Arena; Attendance: 4,872; Referee: Christian-Petru Ciochirca

22 October 2023 11	Rapid Wien	2–3	Austria Klagenfurt	Vienna
16:00 CEST (UTC+2)	Burgstaller 12'; Querfeld 90+2'	Report	Karweina 61', 66'; Schwarz 74'	Stadium: Allianz Stadion; Attendance: 17,630; Referee: Sebastian Gishamer

28 October 2023 12	Austria Klagenfurt	1–0	WSG Tirol	Klagenfurt
16:00 CEST (UTC+2)	Jaritz 45+2'	Report		Stadium: 28 Black Arena; Attendance: 3,452; Referee: Markus Hameter

4 November 2023 13	Wolfsberger AC	4–0	Austria Klagenfurt	Wolfsberg
15:00 CET (UTC+1)	Bamba 20'; Boakye 43', 75'; Ballo 69'	Report		Stadium: Lavanttal-Arena; Attendance: 4,443; Referee: Josef Spurny

12 November 2023 14	Austria Klagenfurt	0–3	Sturm Graz	Klagenfurt
12:30 CET (UTC+1)		Report	Gorenc Stanković 3'; Horvat 19', 67'	Stadium: 28 Black Arena; Attendance: 6,448; Referee: Sebastian Gishamer

26 November 2023 15	Rheindorf Altach	0–1	Austria Klagenfurt	Altach
12:30 CET (UTC+1)		Report	Jaritz 25'	Stadium: CASHPOINT Arena; Attendance: 4,222; Referee: Julian Weinberger

4 December 2023 16	Austria Klagenfurt	1–1	TSV Hartberg	Klagenfurt
18:00 CET (UTC+1)	Binder 79'	Report	Benatelli 56' (o.g.)	Stadium: 28 Black Arena; Attendance: 1,623; Referee: Harald Lechner

9 December 2023 17	Austria Klagenfurt	2–2	Austria Wien	Klagenfurt
15:00 CET (UTC+1)	Benatelli 63'; Karweina 65'	Report	Asllani 75'; Ranftl 85'	Stadium: 28 Black Arena; Attendance: 3,056; Referee: Christian-Petru Ciochirca

11 February 2024 18	LASK	2–2	Austria Klagenfurt	Linz
15:00 CET (UTC+1)	Žulj 31', 90+2'	Report	Karweina 36'; Cvetko 82'	Stadium: Raiffeisen Arena; Attendance: 10,200; Referee: Markus Hameter

18 February 2024 19	Austria Lustenau	0–1	Austria Klagenfurt	Lustenau
12:30 CET (UTC+1)		Report	Karweina 43'	Stadium: Planet Pure Stadion; Attendance: 3,865; Referee: Julian Weinberger

25 February 2024 20	Austria Klagenfurt	2–0	Blau-Weiß Linz	Klagenfurt
12:30 CET (UTC+1)	Schwarz 40', 71'	Report		Stadium: 28 Black Arena; Attendance: 3,480; Referee: Florian Jäger

3 March 2024 21	Red Bull Salzburg	1–0	Austria Klagenfurt	Salzburg
15:00 CET (UTC+1)	Konaté 74'	Report		Stadium: Red Bull Arena; Attendance: 10,521; Referee: Alexander Harkam

10 March 2024 22	Austria Klagenfurt	1–1	Rapid Wien	Klagenfurt
15:00 CET (UTC+1)	Wernitznig 74'	Report	Lang 39'	Stadium: 28 Black Arena; Attendance: 8,529; Referee: Stefan Ebner

==== Championship round ====
Pos	Team	Pld	W	D	L	GF	GA	GD	Pts	Qualification	STU	RBS	LASK	RWI	HAR	AKL
2	Red Bull Salzburg	32	20	7	5	74	29	+45	42	Qualification for the Champions League third qualifying round (Note: Since the Europa League winners, Atalanta qualified for the Champions League via league position, Red Bull Salzburg were promoted from the Champions League second qualifying round to the third qualifying round as one of the two teams with the highest coefficient in the second qualifying round.)	2–2	—	7–1	1–1	5–1	4–2
3	LASK	32	14	10	8	43	33	+10	34	Qualification for the Europa League play-off round (Note: The 2023–24 Austrian Cup winners qualified for the Europa League play-off round. Since the cup winners (Sturm Graz) qualified based on league position, the Europa League spot was passed to the third-placed team.)	2–2	3–1	—	5–0	1–3	1–0
4	Rapid Wien	32	11	12	9	47	35	+12	28	Qualification for the Europa League second qualifying round	1–3	2–0	0–0	—	0–3	1–1
5	Hartberg	32	12	9	11	49	52	−3	28	Qualification for the Conference League play-offs	1–3	1–5	1–2	0–3	—	3–2
6	Austria Klagenfurt	32	9	12	11	40	50	−10	22		0–4	4–3	0–2	0–1	2–2	—

Source: Austrian Football Bundesliga
Legend: Blue = home team win; Yellow = draw; Red = away team win.
Rules for classification: 1) Points; 2) Points with (possible) half points subtracted due to rounding; 3) Head-to-head points; 4) Head-to-head goal difference; 5) Head-to-head goals scored; 6) Goal difference; 7) Goals scored; 8) Matches won; 9) Away matches won; 10) Away goals scored.

==== Results by round ====
Round	1	2	3	4	5	6	7	8	9	10
Ground	H	A	H	A	A	H	A	H	H	A
Result	L	L	D	D						
Position	5	5	5	5						

Updated to match(es) played on 18 April 2024. Source: Soccerway
A = Away; H = Home; W = Win; D = Draw; L = Loss

==== Matches ====
17 March 2024 23	Austria Klagenfurt	0–4	Sturm Graz	Klagenfurt
12:30 CET (UTC+1)		Report	Biereth 5', 18'; Horvat 23'; Bøving 39'	Stadium: 28 Black Arena; Attendance: 6,045; Referee: Alan Kijas

31 March 2024 24	LASK	1–0	Austria Klagenfurt	Linz
12:30 CET (UTC+1)	Luckeneder 58'	Report		Stadium: Raiffeisen Arena; Attendance: 9,400; Referee: Julian Weinberger

7 April 2024 25	Austria Klagenfurt	2–2	TSV Hartberg	Klagenfurt
12:30 CET (UTC+1)	Gezos 29'; Irving 90+7' (pen.)	Report	Entrup 25' (pen.); Prokop 45+1'	Stadium: 28 Black Arena; Attendance: 3,125; Referee: Florian Jäger

14 April 2024 26	Rapid Wien	1–1	Austria Klagenfurt	Vienna
15:00 CET (UTC+1)	Jansson 5'	Report	Besuschkow 55'	Stadium: Allianz Stadion; Attendance: 19,600; Referee: Christian-Petru Ciochirca

21 April 2024 27	Red Bull Salzburg	v	Austria Klagenfurt	Salzburg
15:00 CET (UTC+1)		Report		Stadium: Red Bull Arena

24 April 2024 28	Austria Klagenfurt	v	Red Bull Salzburg	Klagenfurt
16:30 CET (UTC+1)		Report		Stadium: 28 Black Arena

28 April 2024 29	TSV Hartberg	v	Austria Klagenfurt	Hartberg
12:30 CET (UTC+1)		Report		Stadium: Profertil Arena Hartberg

5 May 2024 30	Austria Klagenfurt	v	LASK	Klagenfurt
12:30 CET (UTC+1)		Report		Stadium: 28 Black Arena

12 May 2024 31	Austria Klagenfurt	v	Rapid Wien	Klagenfurt
15:00 CET (UTC+1)		Report		Stadium: 28 Black Arena

19 May 2024 32	Sturm Graz	v	Austria Klagenfurt	Graz
15:00 CET (UTC+1)		Report		Stadium: Merkur–Arena

=== Austrian Cup ===
The draw for the season's first round took place on 25 June.

22 July 2023 First round	SK Vorwärts Steyr	0–3	Austria Klagenfurt	Steyr
19:30 CEST (UTC+2)		Report	Arweiler 23'; Karweina 63'; Mahrer 71'	Stadium: Vorwärts Stadium; Attendance: 1,000; Referee: Daniel Pfister

27 September 2023 Second round	FC Marchfeld Donauauen	2–3	Austria Klagenfurt	Mannsdorf
17:30 CEST (UTC+2)	Meister 6', 80'	Report	Irving 4' (pen.); Nowotny 23' (o.g.); Karweina 76'	Stadium: Aulandstadion; Attendance: 300; Referee: Samuel Sampl

1 November 2023 Third round	Austria Wien	1–0	Austria Klagenfurt	Vienna
17:00 CET (UTC+1)	Asllani 24'	Report		Stadium: Viola Park; Attendance: 11,223; Referee: Christopher Jäger
