= List of Austrian football transfers summer 2024 =

This is a list of Austrian football transfers for the 2024 summer transfer window. Only transfers featuring Austrian Football Bundesliga are listed.

== Austrian Football Bundesliga ==
Note: Flags indicate national team as has been defined under FIFA eligibility rules. Players may hold more than one non-FIFA nationality.

=== Sturm Graz ===
In:

No.	Pos.	Nation	Player
14	MF	CRO	Lovro Zvonarek (on loan from (Germany) Bayern Munich)
17	DF	AUT	Emir Karić (from (Germany) Darmstadt 98)
21	MF	DEN	Tochi Chukwuani (from (Denmark) Lyngby)
23	DF	SVN	Arjan Malić (from SV Ried)
24	DF	BEL	Dimitri Lavalée (from (Belgium) Mechelen, previously on loan)
30	MF	HUN	Martin Kern (from (Hungary) Puskás Akadémia)

Out:

No.	Pos.	Nation	Player
14	MF	ESP	Javi Serrano (loan return to (Spain) Atlético Madrid)
16	GK	CZE	Vítězslav Jaroš (loan return to (England) Liverpool)
18	FW	DEN	Mika Biereth (loan return to (England) Arsenal)
21	MF	AUT	Samuel Stückler (free agent)
28	DF	AUT	David Schnegg (to (United States) D.C. United)
42	DF	AUT	David Affengruber (free agent)
—	MF	AUT	Vesel Demaku (to SCR Altach, previously on loan)
—	MF	AUT	Luca Kronberger (to SCR Altach, previously on loan at WSG Tirol)
—	FW	GHA	Mohammed Fuseini (to (Belgium) Union Saint-Gilloise, previously on loan at (Denmark) Randers)

=== Red Bull Salzburg ===
In:

No.	Pos.	Nation	Player
1	GK	GER	Janis Blaswich (on loan from (Germany) RB Leipzig)
16	MF	JPN	Takumu Kawamura (from (Japan) Sanfrecce Hiroshima)

Out:

No.	Pos.	Nation	Player
13	GK	GER	Timo Horn (free agent)
17	DF	AUT	Andreas Ulmer (free agent)
20	FW	MLI	Sékou Koïta (free agent)
25	DF	AUT	Flavius Daniliuc (loan return to (Italy) Salernitana)
36	MF	AUT	Justin Omoregie (on loan to Hartberg)
—	MF	GHA	Lawrence Agyekum (on loan to (Belgium) Cercle Brugge, previously on loan at Liefering)
—	FW	SUI	Federico Crescenti (on loan to (Liechtenstein) Vaduz, previously on loan at SW Bregenz)
—	GK	GER	Nico Mantl (to (Portugal) Arouca, previously on loan at (Denmark) Viborg)
—	DF	AUT	Lukas Ibertsberger (to Blau-Weiß Linz, previously on loan at Wolfsberger AC)
—	MF	MLI	Mamadou Sangare (to Rapid Wien, previously on loan at Hartberg)

=== LASK ===
In:

No.	Pos.	Nation	Player
6	MF	NED	Melayro Bogarde (from (Germany) Hoffenheim II)
17	DF	GER	Jérôme Boateng (from (Italy) Salernitana)
26	DF	CRO	Hrvoje Smolčić (on loan from (Germany) Eintracht Frankfurt)
—	FW	AUT	Maximilian Entrup (from Hartberg)

Out:

No.	Pos.	Nation	Player
6	DF	AUT	Philipp Wiesinger (free agent)
24	FW	AUT	Elias Havel (on loan to Hartberg)
25	DF	GER	Sanoussy Ba (loan return to (Germany) RB Leipzig)
33	DF	AUT	Felix Luckeneder (free agent)
36	GK	AUT	Lukas Jungwirth (on loan to Admira Wacker)
—	FW	AUT	Dominik Weixelbraun (to Amstetten, previously on loan)
—	FW	AUT	Tobias Anselm (to WSG Tirol, previously on loan at (Germany) Viktoria Köln)

=== Rapid Wien ===
In:

No.	Pos.	Nation	Player
3	DF	AUT	Benjamin Böckle (from (Germany) Fortuna Düsseldorf, previously on loan at (Germany) Preußen Münster)
4	DF	AUT	Jakob Schöller (from Admira Wacker)
6	DF	FRA	Serge-Philippe Raux-Yao (from (France) Rodez)
17	MF	MLI	Mamadou Sangare (from Red Bull Salzburg, previously on loan at Hartberg)
21	MF	AUT	Louis Schaub (from (Germany) Hannover 96)
22	FW	SWE	Isak Jansson (from (Spain) Cartagena, previously on loan)
77	DF	HUN	Bendegúz Bolla (from (England) Wolverhampton Wanderers, previously on loan at (Switzerland) Servette)

Out:

No.	Pos.	Nation	Player
6	DF	NED	Neraysho Kasanwirjo (loan return to (Netherlands) Feyenoord)
7	FW	AUT	Oliver Strunz (to SCR Altach)
13	MF	AUT	Thorsten Schick (to DSV Leoben)
15	DF	NED	Terence Kongolo (loan return to (England) Fulham)
17	FW	FRA	Fally Mayulu (to (England) Bristol City)
19	DF	AUT	Michael Sollbauer (to SV Ried)
21	GK	AUT	Bernhard Unger (to First Vienna)
26	DF	AUT	Martin Moormann (to Blau-Weiß Linz)
27	FW	AUT	Marco Grüll (to (Germany) Werder Bremen)
43	DF	AUT	Leopold Querfeld (to (Germany) Union Berlin)
—	DF	AUT	Pascal Fallmann (to (Germany) Erzgebirge Aue, previously on loan at (Germany) Freiburg II)

=== Hartberg ===
In:

No.	Pos.	Nation	Player
—	FW	AUT	Elias Havel (on loan from LASK)
—	FW	AUT	Aaron-Sky Schwarz (on loan from Rapid Wien II, previously on loan at Austria Klagenfurt)
—	FW	NED	Nelson Amadin (from (Germany) Schalke 04 II)
—	MF	AUT	Justin Omoregie (on loan from Red Bull Salzburg)
—	MF	SVN	Benjamin Markuš (from (Slovenia) Domžale)
—	MF	AUT	Jonas Karner (from Sturm Graz II)
—	MF	AUT	Sandro Schendl (from SV Ried)
—	MF	MLI	Youba Diarra (on loan from (Spain) Cádiz)
—	FW	AUT	Marco Hoffmann (from USV Halbturn)
—	MF	AUT	Muhammed Canazlar (from AKA Vorarlberg)

Out:

No.	Pos.	Nation	Player
3	DF	GER	Angelo Brückner (loan return to (Germany) Bayern Munich II)
5	DF	SCO	Ibane Bowat (loan return to (England) Fulham)
11	FW	AUT	Maximilian Entrup (to LASK)
12	DF	AUT	Michael Steinwender (to (Sweden) Värnamo)
16	DF	AUT	Manfred Gollner (to Obdach)
17	MF	AUT	Mario Kröpfl (to ATUS Velden)
18	DF	AUT	Sam Schutti (to SV Oberwart)
32	MF	MLI	Ousmane Diakité (to (England) West Bromwich Albion)
33	MF	AUT	Dominik Frieser (to Grazer AK)
39	GK	AUT	Tobias Knoflach (free agent)
40	GK	AUT	Fabian Ehmann (to ASK Voitsberg)
45	MF	MLI	Mamadou Sangare (loan return to Red Bull Salzburg)

=== Austria Klagenfurt ===
In:

No.	Pos.	Nation	Player
6	MF	AUT	Tobias Koch (from Blau-Weiß Linz)
19	DF	AUT	Niklas Szerencsi (from Kapfenberger SV)
27	DF	GER	Jonas Kühn (from (Germany) Viktoria Berlin)
30	GK	AUT	Simon Spari (from FAC)
77	FW	GER	Ben Bobzien (on loan from (Germany) Mainz 05, previously on loan at Austria Lustenau)
80	MF	KOR	Lee Min-young (from (South Korea) Yonsei University)
95	MF	AUT	Philipp Wydra (on loan from Rapid Wien II)

Out:

No.	Pos.	Nation	Player
4	DF	SRB	Nikola Đorić (free agent)
6	MF	MAR	Ali Loune (loan return to (Germany) 1. FC Nürnberg)
10	FW	GER	Sinan Karweina (to (Switzerland) Luzern)
13	GK	GER	Phillip Menzel (to (Germany) 1. FC Saarbrücken)
19	MF	SCO	Andy Irving (loan return to (England) West Ham United)
20	MF	GER	Rico Benatelli (to (Germany) Waldhof Mannheim)
23	MF	GER	Max Besuschkow (loan return to (Germany) Hannover 96)
30	GK	AUT	David Puntigam (free agent)
33	DF	GER	Till Schumacher (to (Germany) 1. FC Saarbrücken)
37	DF	AUT	Nicolas Wimmer (to Wolfsberger AC)
39	FW	GER	Jonas Arweiler (free agent)
77	FW	AUT	Aaron-Sky Schwarz (loan return to Rapid Wien)
92	MF	AUT	Fabio Markelic (free agent)
99	FW	CRO	Anton Maglica (free agent)
—	MF	AUT	Moritz Berg (free agent, previously on loan at (Germany) Viktoria Berlin)

=== Wolfsberger AC ===
In:

No.	Pos.	Nation	Player
—	DF	AUT	Nicolas Wimmer (from Austria Klagenfurt)
—	DF	SRB	Boris Matić (from (Serbia) Red Star Belgrade youth)

Out:

No.	Pos.	Nation	Player
1	GK	GER	Hendrik Bonmann (to (Bulgaria) Ludogorets Razgrad)
6	MF	NGA	Samson Tijani (loan return to Red Bull Salzburg)
9	FW	AUT	Bernhard Zimmermann (loan return to Rapid Wien)
16	MF	AUT	Mario Leitgeb (to DSV Leoben)
17	DF	AUT	Nikolas Veratschnig (to (Germany) Mainz 05)
26	DF	AUT	Lukas Ibertsberger (loan return to Red Bull Salzburg)
27	DF	AUT	Michael Novak (to Treibach)
—	DF	AUT	Raphael Schifferl (to (Germany) 1860 Munich, previously on loan at (Germany) SpVgg Unterhaching)

=== Austria Wien ===
In:

No.	Pos.	Nation	Player
5	MF	GAM	Abubakr Barry (from (Israel) Bnei Yehuda)
70	FW	BRA	Cristiano (on loan from (Brazil) São Bento)
77	FW	GER	Maurice Malone (on loan from (Switzerland) Basel)

Out:

No.	Pos.	Nation	Player
1	GK	GER	Christian Früchtl (to (Italy) Lecce)
8	MF	AUS	James Holland (free agent)
10	FW	KOS	Fisnik Asllani (loan return to (Germany) TSG 1899 Hoffenheim)
11	FW	AUT	Manuel Polster (to (Switzerland) Lausanne)
33	FW	AUT	Alexander Schmidt (to Blau-Weiß Linz)
41	DF	GER	Frans Krätzig (loan return to (Germany) Bayern Munich)
—	MF	AUT	Matthias Braunöder (to (Italy) Como, previously on loan)
—	DF	AUT	Leonardo Ivkić (to Wiener SC, previously on loan at Stripfing)
—	MF	AUT	Enes Safin (to Juniors OÖ, previously on loan at Stripfing)
—	FW	AUT	Can Keleş (to (Turkey) Fatih Karagümrük, previously on loan)

=== Blau-Weiß Linz ===
In:

No.	Pos.	Nation	Player
6	MF	BRA	Lucas Dantas (from (Brazil) Lemense)
8	MF	GER	Oliver Wähling (from (Germany) VfL Osnabrück)
13	FW	AUT	Alexander Schmidt (from Austria Wien)
16	DF	AUT	Martin Moormann (from Rapid Wien)
26	DF	AUT	Lukas Ibertsberger (from Red Bull Salzburg, previously on loan at Wolfsberger AC)
28	DF	BRA	Anderson (from Austria Lustenau)

Out:

No.	Pos.	Nation	Player
4	MF	AUT	Marco Krainz (free agent)
6	MF	AUT	Tobias Koch (to Austria Klagenfurt)
13	MF	AUT	Michael Brandner (to Union Mondsee)
22	DF	AUT	Fabian Windhager (to Austria Salzburg)
27	DF	AUT	Stefan Haudum (to Admira Wacker)
—	GK	AUT	Felix Gschossmann (to SW Bregenz, previously on loan at St. Pölten)

=== SCR Altach ===
In:

No.	Pos.	Nation	Player
4	DF	AUT	Filip Milojević (from (Germany) Bayer Leverkusen youth)
6	MF	AUT	Vesel Demaku (from Sturm Graz, previously on loan)
10	FW	BRA	Lincoln (free agent)
14	FW	AUT	Lukas Fridrikas (from Austria Lustenau)
16	MF	AUT	Luca Kronberger (from Sturm Graz, previously on loan at WSG Tirol)
17	FW	AUT	Oliver Strunz (from Rapid Wien)
18	DF	LIE	Felix Oberwaditzer (from AKA Vorarlberg)
19	MF	AUT	Diego Madritsch (from SV Ried)
21	GK	AUT	Ammar Helac (from Austria Lustenau)
—	FW	ALB	Anteo Fetahu (from Dornbirn)

Out:

No.	Pos.	Nation	Player
4	DF	AUT	Felix Strauß (free agent)
6	DF	AUT	Constantin Reiner (loan return to (Poland) Piast Gliwice)
10	FW	AUT	Dominik Reiter (free agent)
17	DF	AUT	Nosa Iyobosa Edokpolor (free agent)
18	DF	AUT	Jan Zwischenbrugger (free agent)
24	MF	AUT	Manuel Prietl (retired)
28	MF	CRO	Jan Jurčec (free agent)
31	GK	AUT	Alexander Eckmayr (to WSG Tirol)
32	GK	AUT	Tobias Schützenauer (free agent)
—	FW	ALB	Anteo Fetahu (on loan to SW Bregenz)
—	GK	AUT	Jakob Odehnal (to FAC, previously on loan at Dornbirn)

=== WSG Tirol ===
In:

No.	Pos.	Nation	Player
5	DF	GER	Jamie Lawrence (from (Germany) Bayern Munich II, previously on loan at (Germany) 1. FC Magdeburg)
7	FW	USA	Quincy Butler (from (Germany) Hoffenheim II)
11	FW	AUT	Tobias Anselm (from LASK, previously on loan at (Germany) Viktoria Köln)
13	GK	AUT	Alexander Eckmayr (from SCR Altach)
16	FW	AUT	Lukas Hinterseer (from (Germany) Hansa Rostock II)

Out:

No.	Pos.	Nation	Player
5	DF	AUT	Felix Bacher (free agent)
9	FW	SVN	Nik Prelec (loan return to (Italy) Cagliari)
11	FW	POL	Aleksander Buksa (loan return to (Italy) Genoa)
13	GK	AUT	Benjamin Ozegovic (free agent)
18	FW	AUT	Denis Tomic (to DSV Leoben)
25	GK	GER	Ferdinand Oswald (retired)
26	DF	CRO	Dominik Štumberger (free agent)
44	DF	GER	Kofi Schulz (free agent)
98	MF	SVN	Sandi Ogrinec (free agent)

=== Grazer AK ===
In:

No.	Pos.	Nation	Player
—	MF	AUT	Dominik Frieser (from Hartberg)
—	DF	AUS	Jacob Italiano (from (Germany) Borussia Mönchengladbach II)
—	DF	AUT	Moritz Eder (from Pinzgau Saalfelden)
—	MF	SVN	Tio Cipot (on loan from (Italy) Spezia)
—	GK	AUT	Juri Kirchmayr (from (Germany) VfL Wolfsburg youth)

Out:

No.	Pos.	Nation	Player
11	MF	GEO	Levan Eloshvili (to Kapfenberger SV)
16	MF	AUT	Thomas Mayer (free agent)
23	MF	AUT	Paolo Jager (free agent)
24	DF	AUT	Felix Köchl (free agent)
25	FW	GER	Lenn Jastremski (loan return to (Germany) Bayern Munich)
32	MF	AUT	Martin Murg (to SC Weiz)
33	GK	AUT	Maximilian Fahler (free agent)
70	FW	AUT	Jan Stefanon (to SW Bregenz)
—	DF	AUT	Sebastian Jost (on loan to SC Weiz, previously on loan at SV Tillmitsch)
—	FW	AUT	Max Rauter (on loan to SV Tillmitsch, previously on loan at SV Wildon)
—	DF	AUT	Maximilian Somnitz (to (Germany) FSV Zwickau, previously on loan)
—	FW	AUT	Florian Jessenitschnig (to Fürstenfeld, previously on loan)
—	FW	AUT	Paul Kiedl (to SC Weiz, previously on loan at USV St. Anna)

== See also ==
- 2024–25 Austrian Football Bundesliga
