= Ibertsberger =

Ibertsberger is a surname. Notable people with the surname include:

- Andreas Ibertsberger (born 1982), Austrian footballer
- Lukas Ibertsberger (born 2003), Austrian footballer
- Robert Ibertsberger (born 1977), Austrian footballer and manager
