= Polydoros Gezos =

Greek footballer

Personal information
- Date of birth: 3 September 1994 (age 32)
- Place of birth: Athens, Greece
- Height: 1.80 m (5 ft 11 in)
- Position: Defensive midfielder

Team information
- Current team: Doxa Vyronas

Youth career
- Panionios

Senior career*
Years	Team	Apps	(Gls)
2014–2016	Panionios	0	(0)
2015–2016	→ A.E. Kifisia (loan)		
2016–2017	A.E. Kifisia		
2017–2019	Ilisiakos		
2019–2020	Austria Klagenfurt	18	(1)
2020–2021	Ialysos	15	(0)
2022	Aiolikos		
2022–2023	Ialysos		
2023	Marko		
2023–2026	Saronikos Anavyssos		
2026–	Doxa Vyronas		
- * Club domestic league appearances and goals as of 19 June 2021

Polydoros Gezos (Greek: Πολύδωρος Γκέζος; born 3 September 1994) is a Greek professional footballer who plays as a defensive midfielder for Gamma Ethniki club Doxa Vyronas.

== Personal life ==
Gezos' older brother, Kosmas, is also a professional footballer.
