= Martin Hinteregger =

Austrian footballer (born 1992)

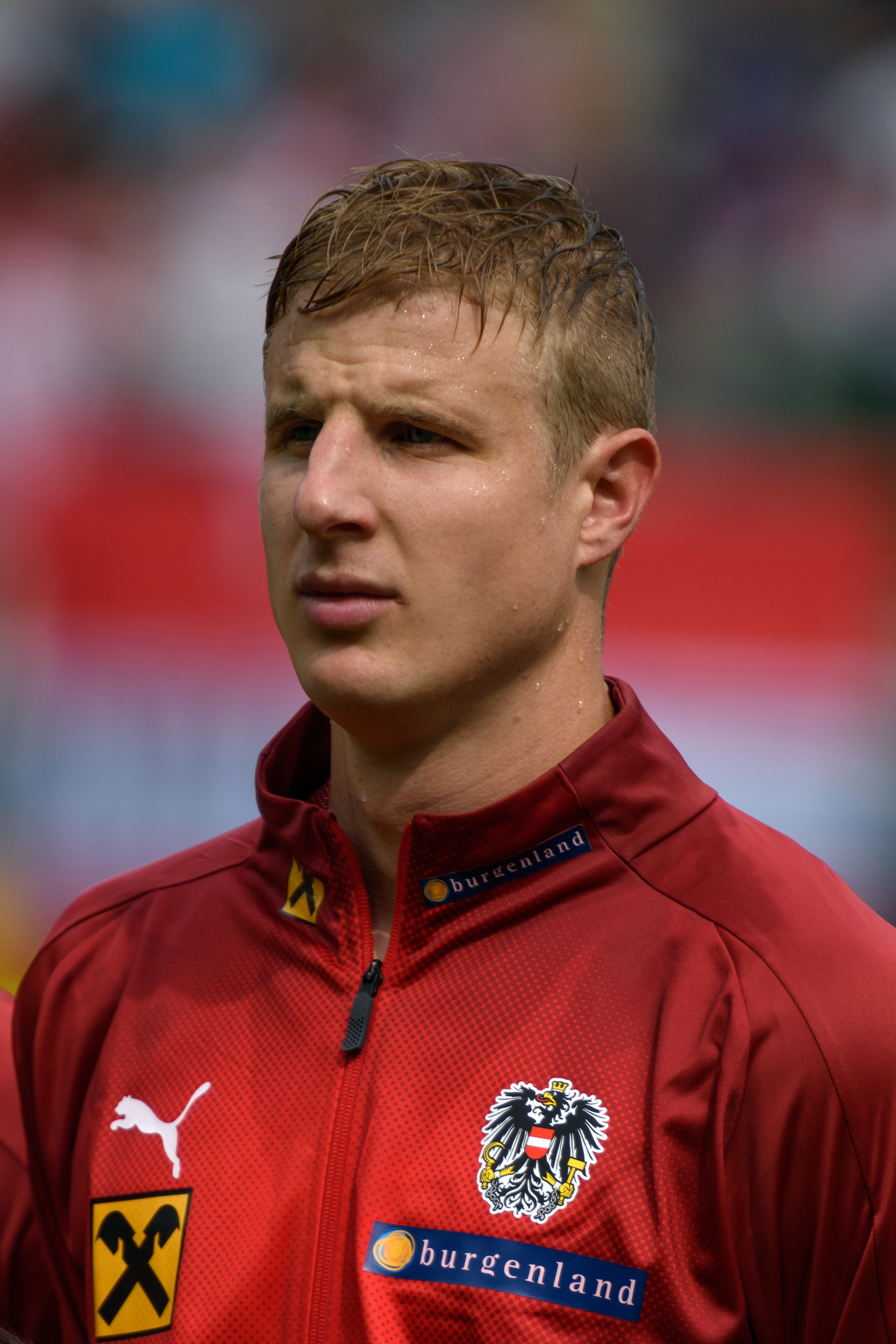
- Hinteregger with Austria in 2018

Personal information
- Full name: Martin Josef Hinteregger
- Date of birth: 7 September 1992 (age 34)
- Place of birth: Sankt Veit an der Glan, Austria
- Height: 1.84 m (6 ft 0 in)
- Positions: Centre-back; forward

Team information
- Current team: SGA Sirnitz
- Number: 13

Youth career
- 1999–2007: SGA Sirnitz
- 2006–2010: Red Bull Salzburg

Senior career*
Years	Team	Apps	(Gls)
2009–2011	Red Bull Salzburg Juniors	13	(6)
2010–2016	Red Bull Salzburg	143	(5)
2016	→ Borussia Mönchengladbach (loan)	10	(0)
2016–2019	FC Augsburg	79	(5)
2019	→ Eintracht Frankfurt (loan)	14	(1)
2019–2022	Eintracht Frankfurt	87	(11)
2022–2024	SGA Sirnitz	59	(40)
2025	Austria Klagenfurt	14	(0)
2025–	SGA Sirnitz	9	(5)

International career
2008–2009	Austria U17	3	(0)
2009–2010	Austria U18	4	(0)
2010	Austria U19	5	(0)
2010–2013	Austria U21	13	(0)
2013–2022	Austria	67	(4)

Managerial career
- 2023–: SGA Sirnitz (player-coach)
- * Club domestic league appearances and goals as of 21:21, 16 March 2026 (UTC)

Martin Josef Hinteregger (born 7 September 1992) is an Austrian semi-retired professional footballer and manager who plays as a centre-back or forward for Unterliga Mitte club SGA Sirnitz, which he also manages.

He began his career with SGA Sirnitz before establishing himself at Red Bull Salzburg, where he won five Austrian Bundesliga titles and four Austrian Cups. He later played in the German Bundesliga for FC Augsburg and Eintracht Frankfurt, winning the UEFA Europa League in 2022with the latter. After retiring from professional football in June 2022, he returned to amateur club SGA Sirnitz as a forward. In 2025, he officially came out of retirement, joining Austria Klagenfurt professionally.

Hinteregger made his senior debut for the Austria national team in 2013 after previously representing his country at youth level. He was selected for UEFA Euro 2016 and UEFA Euro 2020, and won 67 caps for his country.

== Club career ==
=== Early years ===
Hinteregger began playing football shortly before his seventh birthday in 1999 in the youth team of SGA Sirnitz in Albeck, Carinthia in the Feldkirchen District. There he progressed through various youth teams under the tutelage of his father Franz Hinteregger, who worked as a youth coach at the club. Hinteregger won several championships at under-10 to under-14 level with the Sirnitz youth teams and finished third at the Carinthian Futsal Indoor Football Championships in 2006 with the under-14 team.

=== Red Bull Salzburg ===
==== 2006–2009: Rise to the first team ====
In July 2006, Hinteregger was scouted by cooperation club Red Bull Salzburg. After 12 youth appearances and two goals in the 2006–07 season, another 19 games and one goal followed in the 2007–08 season, in which he was already accepted as a permanent member of the youth department of Salzburg and was no longer in the squad as a cooperation player.

After having played in a few U17 games, he made his first appearance for the club's U19 team in March 2009, competing in the U19 League. On 2 May 2009, he scored his first goal for the team in the 26th minute of a 3–2 away defeat against the U19 academy team from Vorarlberg. During this season, Hinteregger was utilised in a total of eleven U19 games in which he scored two goals. In the 2009–10 season, the native Carinthian was also an integral part of the left defensive side of the academy team, for which he appeared in 14 games until the end of March 2010 and scored four goals.

==== 2009–2016: Becoming a starter ====
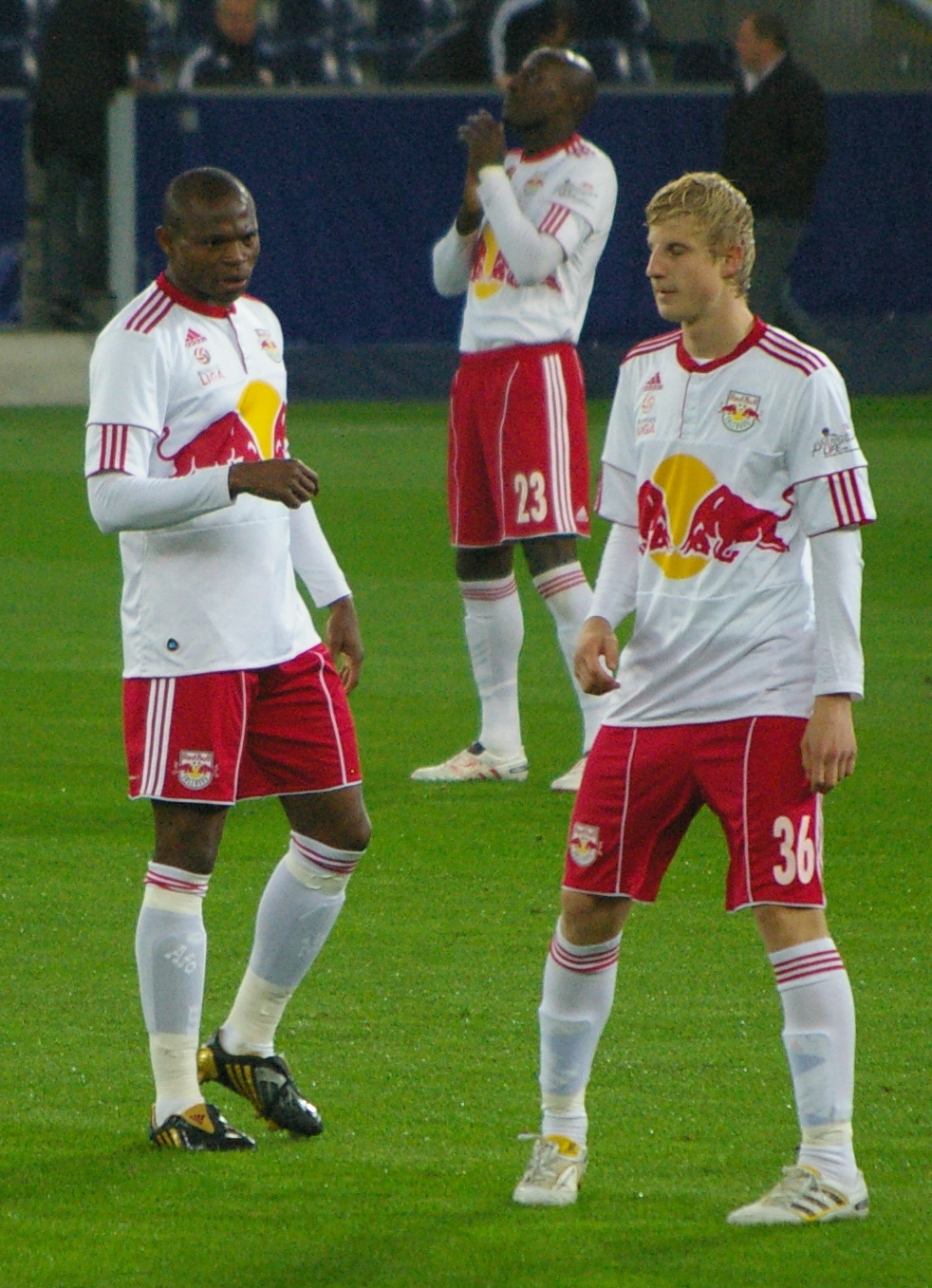
Rabiu Afolabi, Ibrahim Sekagya and Martin Hinteregger, (L to R) at the latter's debut in 2010

After being promoted to the Red Bull Salzburg reserve team competing in the Second League in early 2010, Hinteregger made his professional debut on 23 April 2010 in the 2–0 away win over FC Dornbirn playing the full match.

With his first professional appearance over a full 90 minutes and predominantly good performances in the following games, he increasingly established himself in the second team. The reason for his first appearance had been defensive all-rounder Harald Pichler being suspended due to a yellow card. For the 2010–11 season, Hinteregger was a starter in the second team and was also a part of the UEFA Europa League squad of the first team. Due to an injury to Andreas Ulmer, he was on the substitute's bench for a game against Manchester City. He scored his first goal for the reserves in the city derby against SV Austria Salzburg

Hinteregger made his first appearances with professionals team of Red Bull Salzburg in the 2010–11 season under head coach Huub Stevens. He made his debut in the Austrian Bundesliga on 16 October 2010 in a match against Kapfenberger SV. Five days later, he also made his Europa League debut in a match against Juventus.

In the 2011–12 season, he became an integral part of the first team by new coach Ricardo Moniz. He mostly appeared as a left-back during the season. In the Europa League play-offs, he scored the decisive goal in the 1–0 win over Omonia Nicosia, which meant that Salzburg advanced to the group stage after 2–1 away defeat, on the away goals rule. After being appointed team captain by Moniz at the beginning of the 2012 spring season, he was dropped from the squad three weeks later for disciplinary reasons after being involved in a party in Salzburg after a home defeat against SV Mattersburg. The season ended with the club winning the domestic double.

After Moniz had resigned in the summer of 2012, Hinteregger became a starting centre-back in the 2012–13 season under new coach Roger Schmidt, and was also sometimes utilised in the defensive midfield. Red Bull Salzburg were eliminated in the UEFA Champions League qualifiers against F91 Dudelange in the second round, missed out on the league title and were knocked out in the domestic cup against Austrian Regionalliga club FC Pasching.

In the 2013–14 season, Hinteregger became the key player in defence. In 2014, he won his second Austrian Bundesliga title with the team. After failing to advance in the Champions League qualification against Fenerbahçe, they advanced in the Europa League to the round of sixteen and eventually lost to FC Basel. In the 2–1 defeat in the second leg, Hinteregger was suspended because of a yellow card.

After head coach Schmidt left the club in the summer of 2014, Hinteregger remained a regular under his successor Adi Hütter. In the 2014–15 season, Salzburg was only the third club to win successive national championship and cup titles. Internationally, the round of sixteen of the Europa League against Spanish side Villarreal was the final destination; previously, they had been knocked out in the play-offs of the Champions League against Swedish club Malmö FF. In the 2015–16 season, Hinteregger and his team were again knocked out by Malmö in the third qualifying round of the UEFA Champions League. New coach Peter Zeidler, who had succeeded Hütter in the summer, suspended Hinteregger from the first-team squad after he criticised his teammates and the club ahead of a game against Austria Wien.

==== 2016: Loan to Mönchengladbach and return ====
In January 2016, Hinteregger was sent on a six-month loan to German Bundesliga club Borussia Mönchengladbach. He made 10 league appearances, and Borussia decided not to activate the buyout clause at the end of his loan deal.

Hinteregger initially returned to Salzburg for the 2016–17 season. From early-July to the end of August 2016, he made 11 appearances—five of them in the league and all six of Salzburg's games in the Champions League qualification, in which they lost in the play-offs to Dinamo Zagreb.

=== FC Augsburg ===
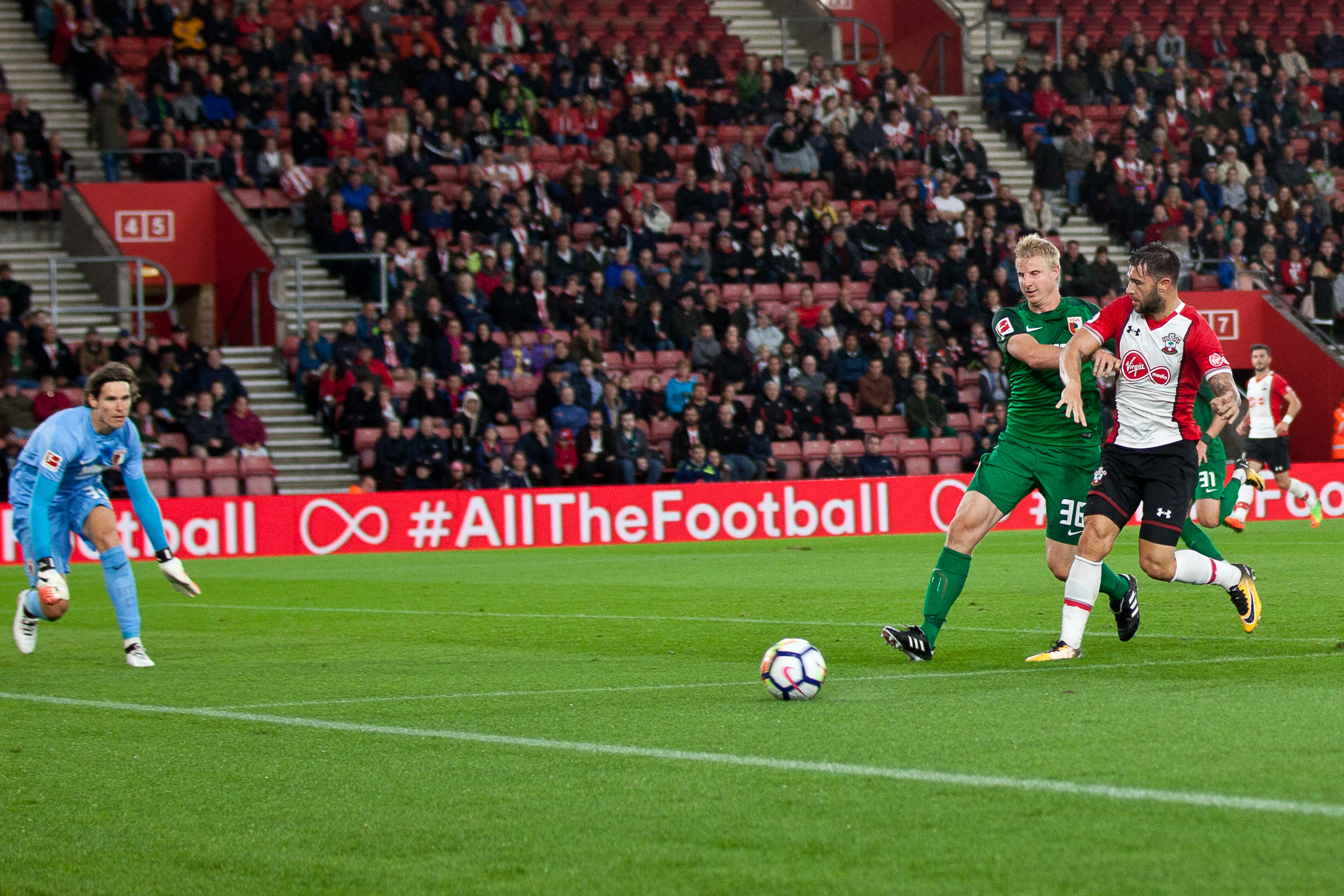
Hinteregger with FC Augsburg fighting off Charlie Austin in a match against Southampton in 2017

On 31 August 2016, Hinteregger joined FC Augsburg on a two-year contract. He made his debut for the club on 11 September 2016 in a 2–1 away victory against Werder Bremen. In December 2016, he scored his first Bundesliga goal in a 1–0 win over his former club Borussia Mönchengladbach.

For Augsburg, Hinteregger made a total of 83 competitive appearances in which he scored five goals. In the first two seasons, Augsburg finished in mid-table before the team slipped into a relegation battle in the 2018–19 season.

"I can't say anything positive about him and I won't say anything negative."' – Martin Hinteregger speaking about head coach Manuel Baum following a defeat to Borussia Mönchengladbach in January 2019.

Following a 2–0 defeat against Borussia Mönchengladbach on 26 January 2019, Hinteregger publicly criticised head coach Manuel Baum in an interview with Bayerischer Rundfunk. In response, the club gave him a "drastic fine", suspended him from team practice and announced shortly after that Hinteregger could look for a new club.

=== Eintracht Frankfurt ===
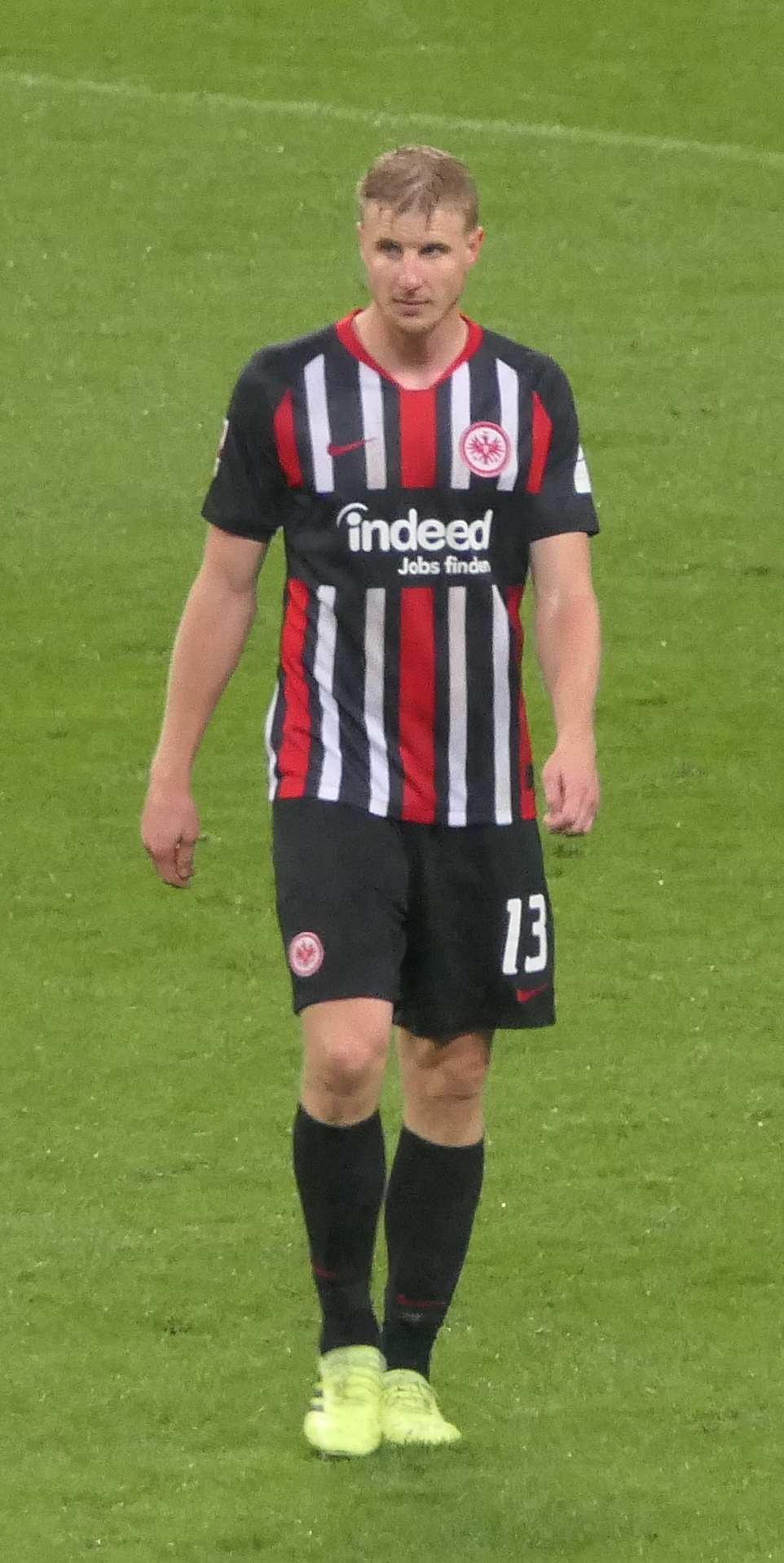
Hinteregger playing for Frankfurt in 2019

On deadline day, 31 January 2019, he was loaned to Eintracht Frankfurt from Augsburg. Under head coach and compatriot Adi Hütter, under whom he had already played in Salzburg, he immediately established himself as a regular starter and featured in the starting eleven in 14 league games by the end of the season, in which he scored one goal.

He was also in the starting lineup in seven Europa League games and, after beating Shakhtar Donetsk, Inter Milan and Benfica, Eintracht made it semi-finals, where they faced eventual winners Chelsea. In the second leg, Hinteregger put in a man of the match performance despite missing a penalty in the shootout, and was celebrated by his own fans after the end of the game. A picture showing him in the arms of a fan comforting him later became the cover of his 2021 book, Martin Hinteregger Innensicht.

Ahead of the 2019–20 season, Hinteregger briefly returned to FC Augsburg, where Martin Schmidt had taken over as head coach in April 2019. In August 2019, Hinteregger signed a permanent deal with Eintracht – a five-year contract. During the season he was a key player in Frankfurt's back three and made a total of 49 competitive appearances. In the Bundesliga, he scored eight goals off corner kicks, making him one of the most prolific goalscoring defenders in Europe. With his team he reached the round of 16 of the Europa League and the semi-finals of the DFB-Pokal.

In the 2020–21 season, Hinteregger maintained his regular place at centre-back and qualified for Europa League with his team in fifth place. Prior to the 2021–22 season, he was named vice-captain by new head coach Oliver Glasner behind new captain Sebastian Rode. He made 37 competitive appearances during the season, where he was almost exclusively in the starting eleven. After Hinteregger had some poor performances in the first half of the season, his form improved from March 2022. In the Europa League in particular, he attracted attention with strong performances and reached the final with his team after victories in the knockout stages against Sevilla, Barcelona and West Ham United. Eintracht would go on to win the final against Rangers on penalties on 18 May 2022; Hinteregger was subsequently included in the competition's team of the season by UEFA.

On 23 June 2022, Eintracht Frankfurt announced the immediate termination of Hinteregger's contract by mutual consent, after which he retired from professional football.

=== Return to SGA Sirnitz ===
After ending his professional career, Hinteregger announced that he intended to return to SGA Sirnitz, albeit as a forward. In July 2022, Eintracht Frankfurt granted him permission to complete the move, as his contract with the club, which had been due to run until 2024, had only been suspended. Later that month, he received playing clearance from the football association, allowing him to register for the fifth-tier side ahead of the new season.

On 18 May 2023, Hinteregger signed a new contract with Sirnitz and took over as player-manager at the start of the 2023–24 season. He stepped down from the role in September 2024 and was later that month temporarily suspended by the Carinthian Football Association after pushing an ASKÖ Mittlern supporter, who subsequently filed a criminal complaint.

He made 59 appearances for Sirnitz in the fifth tier and scored 40 goals.

=== Austria Klagenfurt ===
In January 2025, Hinteregger moved to Austrian Bundesliga club Austria Klagenfurt, where he signed a contract until 2026, making his professional comeback after two and a half years. He made 14 league appearances for Klagenfurt during the season as the club were relegated. A relegation clause in his contract allowed him to leave as a free agent at the end of the 2024–25 season.

=== Third spell with SGA Sirnitz ===
After Klagenfurt were relegated, Hinteregger ended his professional career again after six months and returned to fifth-tier club SGA Sirnitz, where he became player-manager again.

== International career ==
After being capped at various youth levels for Austria, Hinteregger made his debut for the Austria senior team in a 1–0 friendly win over the United States on 19 November 2013.

He represented the national team at 2016 UEFA Euro and 2020 UEFA Euro.

== Personal life ==
In June 2022, two weeks before his retirement, Hinteregger came under fire in the media after it was discovered that he had organized a football event, the "Hinti Cup" in his hometown of Sirnitz, in collaboration with Heinrich Sickl, a far-right politician and former neo-Nazi. Hinteregger later announced that he cut ties with Sickl, and emphasized that he "just want[s] a football tournament to take place and nothing more".

== Career statistics ==
=== Club ===
As of match played 25 October 2025

Appearances and goals by club, season and competition
Club	Season	League			Cup (Note: Includes Austrian Cup, DFB-Pokal)		Europe		Total	
Club	Season	Division	Apps	Goals	Apps	Goals	Apps	Goals	Apps	Goals
Red Bull Salzburg Juniors	2009–10	Austrian First League	1	0	0	0	–		1	0
Red Bull Salzburg Juniors	2010–11	Regionalliga	12	6	1	0	–		13	6
Red Bull Salzburg Juniors	Total		13	6	1	0	–		14	6
Red Bull Salzburg	2010–11	Austrian Bundesliga	22	0	0	0	4 (Note: Appearance(s) in UEFA Europa League)	0	26	0
Red Bull Salzburg	2011–12	Austrian Bundesliga	21	0	4	0	10	1	35	1
Red Bull Salzburg	2012–13	Austrian Bundesliga	24	2	3	0	2 (Note: Appearance(s) in UEFA Champions League)	1	29	3
Red Bull Salzburg	2013–14	Austrian Bundesliga	32	2	6	1	12 (Note: Two appearances in UEFA Champions League, ten appearances and one goal in UEFA Europa League)	1	50	3
Red Bull Salzburg	2014–15	Austrian Bundesliga	31	1	6	0	11 (Note: Three appearances and two goals in UEFA Champions League, eight appearances in UEFA Europa League)	2	48	3
Red Bull Salzburg	2015–16	Austrian Bundesliga	8	0	2	0	3 (Note: Two appearances and one goal in UEFA Champions League, one appearance in UEFA Europa League)	1	13	1
Red Bull Salzburg	2016–17	Austrian Bundesliga	5	0	0	0	6	0	11	0
Red Bull Salzburg	Total		143	5	21	1	48	6	212	12
Borussia M'gladbach (loan)	2015–16	Bundesliga	10	0	0	0	–		10	0
FC Augsburg	2016–17	Bundesliga	31	3	1	0	–		32	3
FC Augsburg	2017–18	Bundesliga	30	0	1	0	–		31	0
FC Augsburg	2018–19	Bundesliga	18	2	2	0	–		20	2
FC Augsburg	Total		79	5	4	0	–		83	5
Eintracht Frankfurt (loan)	2018–19	Bundesliga	14	1	0	0	7	1	21	2
Eintracht Frankfurt	2019–20	Bundesliga	31	8	5	0	13	1	49	9
Eintracht Frankfurt	2020–21	Bundesliga	29	2	2	0	–		31	2
Eintracht Frankfurt	2021–22	Bundesliga	27	1	1	0	9	0	37	1
Eintracht Frankfurt	Total		101	12	8	0	29	2	138	14
SGA Sirnitz	2022–23	Unterliga Ost	26	21	–		–		26	21
SGA Sirnitz	2023–24	Unterliga Ost	25	15	–		–		25	15
SGA Sirnitz	2024–25	Unterliga Ost	8	4	–		–		8	4
SGA Sirnitz	Total		59	40	–		–		59	40
Austria Klagenfurt	2024–25	Austrian Bundesliga	14	0	–		–		14	0
SGA Sirnitz	2025–26	Unterliga Mitte	9	5	3	3	–		12	8
Career total			428	73	37	4	77	8	542	85

=== International ===
Appearances and goals by national team and year
National team	Year	Apps	Goals
Austria	2013	1	0
Austria	2014	6	0
Austria	2015	3	0
Austria	2016	12	1
Austria	2017	5	1
Austria	2018	10	1
Austria	2019	8	1
Austria	2020	8	0
Austria	2021	12	0
Austria	2022	2	0
Total		67	4

Scores and results list Austria's goal tally first, score column indicates score after each Hinteregger goal.

List of international goals scored by Martin Hinteregger
No.	Date	Venue	Opponent	Score	Result	Competition
1.	5 September 2016	Boris Paichadze Dinamo Arena, Tbilisi, Georgia	Georgia	1–0	2–1	2018 FIFA World Cup qualification
2.	11 June 2017	Aviva Stadium, Dublin, Republic of Ireland	Republic of Ireland	1–0	1–1	2018 FIFA World Cup qualification
3.	2 June 2018	Wörthersee Stadion, Klagenfurt, Austria	Germany	1–1	2–1	Friendly
4.	10 October 2019	Ernst-Happel-Stadion, Vienna, Austria	Israel	2–1	3–1	UEFA Euro 2020 qualification

== Honours ==
Red Bull Salzburg

- Austrian Bundesliga: 2011–12, 2013–14, 2014–15, 2015–16
- Austrian Cup: 2011–12, 2013–14, 2014–15, 2015–16

Eintracht Frankfurt

- UEFA Europa League: 2021–22

Individual

- UEFA Europa League Team of the Season: 2021–22
