= David Toshevski =

Macedonian footballer

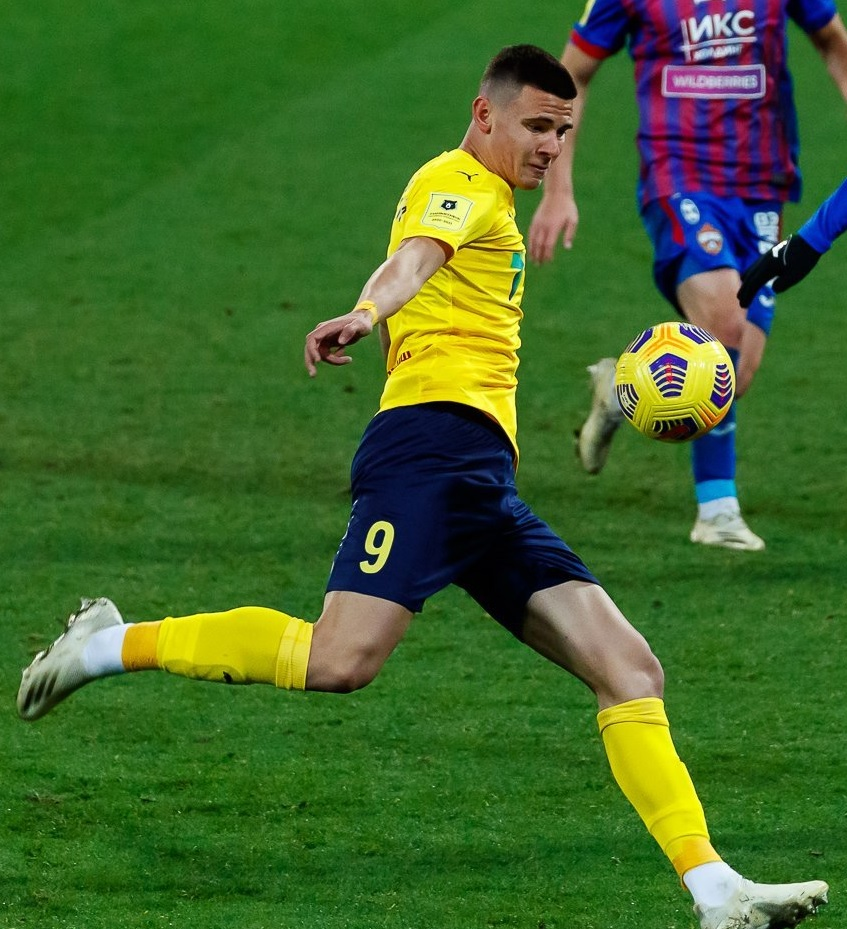
- Toshevski with Rostov in 2020

Personal information
- Date of birth: 16 July 2001 (age 25)
- Place of birth: Skopje, Macedonia
- Height: 1.87 m (6 ft 2 in)
- Position: Striker

Team information
- Current team: Dender
- Number: 9

Youth career
- Rabotnički Skopje

Senior career*
Years	Team	Apps	(Gls)
2019–2020	Rabotnički Skopje	21	(5)
2020–2023	Rostov	9	(0)
2021	→ Tambov (loan)	0	(0)
2021–2022	→ Górnik Zabrze (loan)	1	(0)
2021	→ Górnik Zabrze II (loan)	1	(1)
2022	→ Zemplín Michalovce (loan)	7	(0)
2024–2025	Austria Klagenfurt	23	(6)
2024	→ Šibenik (loan)	16	(3)
2025–	Dender	25	(4)

International career^{‡}
2017–2018	North Macedonia U17	5	(1)
2018	North Macedonia U18	4	(0)
2019	North Macedonia U19	2	(1)
2020–2021	North Macedonia U21	6	(0)
2025–	North Macedonia	1	(0)
- * Club domestic league appearances and goals as of 11 May 2026 ‡ National team caps and goals as of 23 April 2025

David Toshevski (Macedonian: Давид Тошевски; born 16 July 2001) is a Macedonian professional footballer who plays as a striker for Challenger Pro League club Dender and the North Macedonia national team.

== Club career ==
On 7 July 2020, he signed a five-year contract with Russian Premier League club FC Rostov. He made his debut in the Russian Premier League for Rostov on 15 August 2020 in a game against FC Zenit Saint Petersburg.

On 23 February 2021, he was loaned to Russian Premier League club FC Tambov until the end of the 2020–21 season.

On 31 August 2021, he moved to Polish club Górnik Zabrze on loan for the 2021–22 season, with an option to buy. On 18 February 2022, the loan was terminated early.

On the next day, Toshevski joined Zemplín Michalovce in Slovakia on loan until the end of 2022. He debuted for Zemplín on 19 February 2022 in an away fixture at pod Dubňom against Žilina. Toshevski came on in the second half to replace Dimitris Popovits with the final score already set at 2–0, following first professional goal by Mario Sauer.

On 7 September 2023, Toshevski's contract with Rostov was terminated by mutual consent.

On 31 January 2024, Toshevski signed for Austrian Bundesliga club Austria Klagenfurt. He immediately joined Croatian partner club Šibenik on loan for the remainder of the season.

== Career statistics ==
=== Club ===
As of match played 23 May 2026

Appearances and goals by club, season and competition
Club	Season	League			National cup (Note: Includes Russian Cup, Polish Cup, Austrian Cup, Belgian Cup)		Continental		Other		Total	
Club	Season	Division	Apps	Goals	Apps	Goals	Apps	Goals	Apps	Goals	Apps	Goals
Rabotnički Skopje	2019–20	Macedonian First Football League	21	5	—		—		—		21	5
Rostov	2020–21	Russian Premier League	6	0	0	0	1 (Note: Appearance(s) in UEFA Europa League)	0	—		7	0
Rostov	2022–23	Russian Premier League	2	0	—		—		—		2	0
Rostov	2023–24	Russian Premier League	1	0	1	0	—		—		2	0
Rostov	Total		9	0	1	0	1	0	—		11	0
Tambov (loan)	2020–21	Russian Premier League	0	0	—		—		—		0	0
Górnik Zabrze (loan)	2021–22	Ekstraklasa	1	0	2	2	—		—		3	2
Górnik Zabrze II (loan)	2021–22	III liga, group I	1	1	—		—		—		1	1
Zemplín Michalovce (loan)	2021–22	Slovak First Football League	7	0	—		—		—		7	0
Šibenik (loan)	2023–24	Croatian First Football League	16	3	—		—		—		16	3
Austria Klagenfurt	2024–25	Austrian Bundesliga	23	6	3	4	—		—		26	10
Dender	2025–26	Belgian Pro League	25	4	3	0	—		1 (Note: Appearance in Belgian Pro League promotion/relegation play-offs)	0	29	4
Career total			103	19	9	6	1	0	1	0	114	25

=== International ===
As of match played 22 March 2025

Appearances and goals by national team and year
National team	Year	Apps	Goals
North Macedonia
North Macedonia	2025	1	0
Total		1	0

== Honours ==
Šibenik

- First Football League (Croatia): 2023–24
