= Kosmas Gezos =

Greek footballer

Kosmas Gkezos
Personal information
- Date of birth: 15 August 1992 (age 34)
- Place of birth: Athens, Greece
- Height: 1.82 m (6 ft 0 in)
- Position: Centre-back

Youth career
- –2011: Panionios

Senior career*
Years	Team	Apps	(Gls)
2011–2015	Panionios	10	(0)
2012	→ Glyfada (loan)	1	(0)
2013	→ Acharnaikos (loan)	12	(1)
2013–2014	→ Glyfada (loan)	11	(2)
2016–2019	Akropolis	53	(4)
2019–2025	Austria Klagenfurt	151	(17)
2025–2026	Athens Kallithea	16	(0)
- * Club domestic league appearances and goals as of 21 April 2026

Kosmas Gkezos (Greek: Κοσμάς Γκέζος; born 15 August 1992) is a Greek professional footballer who plays as a centre-back.

== Personal life ==
Gezos' younger brother, Polydoros, is also a professional footballer.
