= Solomon Bonnah =

Dutch footballer (born 2003)

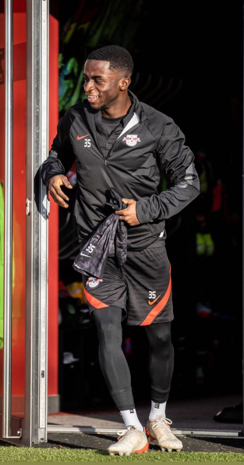

Personal information
- Full name: Solomon Owusu Bonnah
- Date of birth: 19 August 2003 (age 23)
- Place of birth: Amsterdam, Netherlands
- Height: 1.65 m (5 ft 5 in)
- Position: Right-back

Team information
- Current team: Vitesse
- Number: 2

Youth career
- 2008–2012: Zeeburgia
- 2012–2019: Ajax
- 2019–2021: RB Leipzig

Senior career*
Years	Team	Apps	(Gls)
2021–2022	RB Leipzig	1	(0)
2022–2025	Austria Klagenfurt	64	(4)
2025–	Vitesse	21	(0)

International career^{‡}
2017–2018	Netherlands U15	6	(0)
2018	Netherlands U16	4	(0)
2019–2020	Netherlands U17	8	(1)
2021	Netherlands U19	2	(0)
- * Club domestic league appearances and goals as of 28 April 2026 ‡ National team caps and goals as of 00:01, 25 November 2021 (UTC)

Solomon Owusu Bonnah (born 19 August 2003) is a Dutch professional footballer who plays as a right-back for Vitesse.

== Career ==
A youth product of Zeeburgia and Ajax, Bonnah joined the youth academy of RB Leipzig in 2019. He signed his first professional contract with the club on 14 October 2021. He made his UEFA Champions League debut with RB Leipzing in a 5–0 win over against Club Brugge on 24 November 2021, coming on as a sub in the 79th minute. Four days later, Bonnah made his Bundesliga debut, coming off the bench in the 84th minute for Lukas Klostermann in a 3–1 loss to Bayer Leverkusen.

On 31 August 2022, Bonnah signed a three-year contract with Austria Klagenfurt of the Austrian Football Bundesliga.

On 25 September 2025, Bonnah joined Vitesse, signing a two-year contract.

== International career ==
Born in the Netherlands, Bonnah is of Ghanaian descent. He is a youth international for the Netherlands.

== Honours ==
RB Leipzig

- DFB-Pokal: 2021–22
