= Quincy Butler (soccer) =

American soccer player

Personal information
- Date of birth: September 1, 2001 (age 25)
- Place of birth: Sacramento, California, United States
- Height: 1.73 m (5 ft 8 in)
- Position: Forward

Team information
- Current team: WSG Tirol
- Number: 7

Youth career
- 2015–2019: Sacramento Republic
- 2019–2020: TSG 1899 Hoffenheim

Senior career*
Years	Team	Apps	(Gls)
2017–2019	Sacramento Republic	2	(0)
2020–2024	Hoffenheim II	53	(7)
2024–	WSG Tirol	41	(4)
- * Club domestic league appearances and goals as of 10 June 2026

Quincy Butler (born September 1, 2001) is an American soccer player who plays as a forward for Austrian Bundesliga club WSG Tirol.

== Career ==
On August 18, 2017, Butler signed for United Soccer League club Sacramento Republic as an amateur player after impressing in their academy side. He made his debut for the club on July 10, 2018, as an injury-time substitute during a 3–1 win over Swope Park Rangers.

In the summer of 2019, Butler moved to Bundesliga side TSG 1899 Hoffenheim, initially with their under-19 squad.

On June 27, 2024, Butler signed with Austrian Bundesliga side WSG Tirol.
