= Nicolas Binder =

Austrian footballer (born 2002)

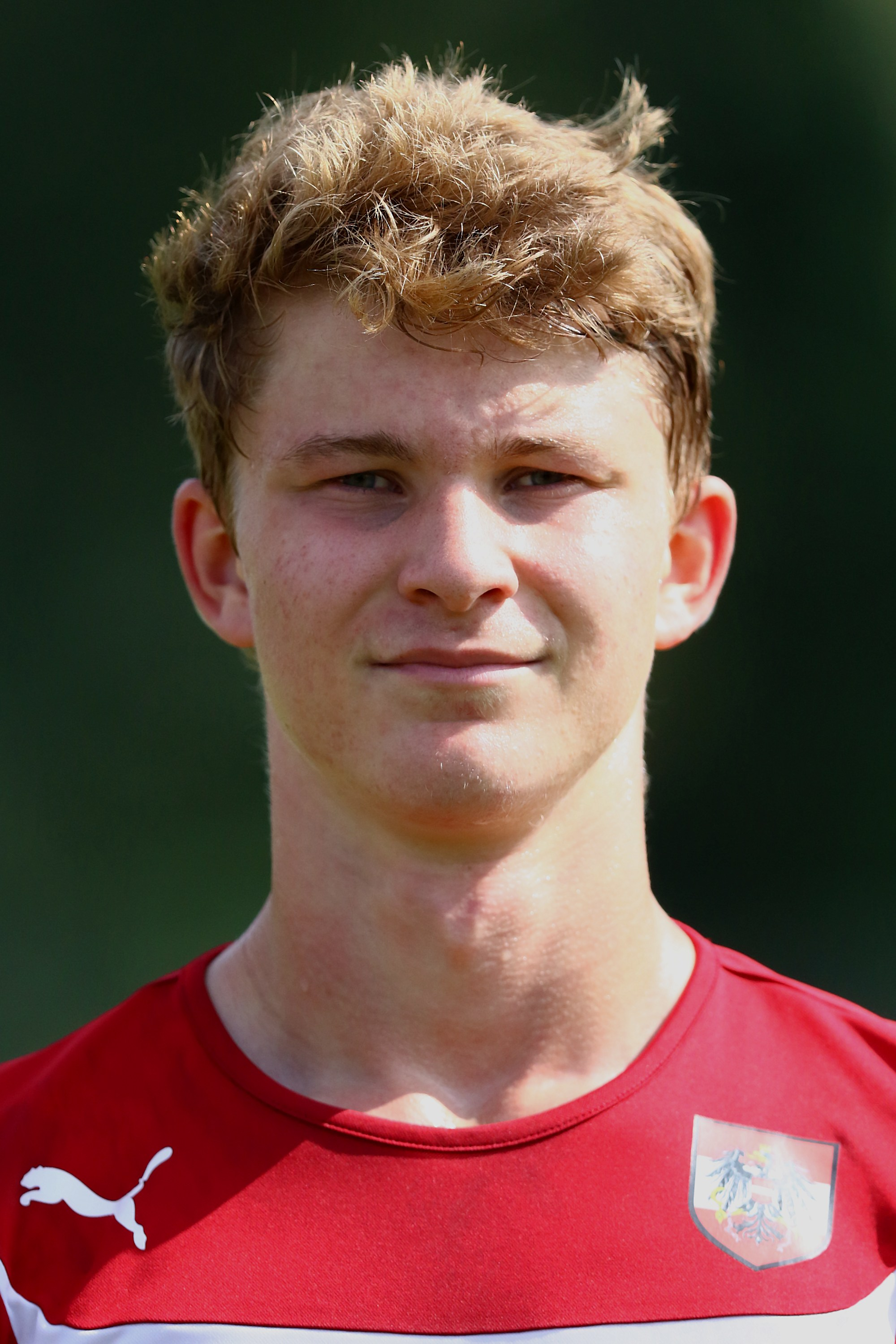
- Binder in 2018

Personal information
- Date of birth: 13 January 2002 (age 24)
- Place of birth: Vienna, Austria
- Height: 1.92 m (6 ft 4 in)
- Position: Striker

Team information
- Current team: Cambuur
- Number: 13

Youth career
- 2008–2009: Union Mauer
- 2009–2019: Rapid Wien

Senior career*
Years	Team	Apps	(Gls)
2019–2023	Rapid Wien II	57	(11)
2022–2023	Rapid Wien	5	(0)
2023–2025	Austria Klagenfurt	47	(4)
2023	Austria Klagenfurt II	1	(0)
2025–	Cambuur	13	(0)

International career^{‡}
2017–2018	Austria U16	5	(0)
2018	Austria U17	4	(0)
2019–2020	Austria U18	4	(0)
- * Club domestic league appearances and goals as of 28 April 2026 ‡ National team caps and goals as of 03:54, 26 June 2022 (UTC)

Nicolas Binder (born 13 January 2002) is an Austrian professional footballer who plays as a striker for Eredivisie club Cambuur.

== Career ==
=== Rapid Wien ===
Binder is a youth product of Union Mauer, and moved to the academy of Rapid Wien in 2009. On 24 June 2020 he signed a professional contract with Rapid Wien, tying him to the club until 2022. He began his professional career with their reserves in 2019, before debuting for their senior team in a 2–1 Austrian Bundesliga win over Wolfsberger AC on 22 August 2022.

=== Austria Klagenfurt ===
On 27 January 2023, he signed a contract with Austria Klagenfurt through to 30 June 2026.

=== Cambuur ===
On 6 June 2025, Binder joined Dutch side Cambuur on a two-year deal with an option for a third, ahead of the 2025–26 Eerste Divisie season. He made his competitive debut for the club on 8 August, the first matchday of the season, starting in Cambuur's 1–0 away loss to Dordrecht. He soon struggled with injury, missing several matches during the first half of the season due to muscle problems in his thigh.

== Personal life ==
His father, Michael, was also a professional footballer in Austria.
