= Simon Straudi =

Italian footballer

Personal information
- Date of birth: 27 January 1999 (age 27)
- Place of birth: Bruneck, Italy
- Height: 1.76 m (5 ft 9 in)
- Positions: Right-back; attacking midfielder

Team information
- Current team: Dynamo Dresden
- Number: 44

Youth career
- ASC St. Georgen/ASC San Giorgio
- –2016: Südtirol
- 2016–2018: Werder Bremen

Senior career*
Years	Team	Apps	(Gls)
2016	Südtirol	0	(0)
2016–2022	Werder Bremen II	49	(4)
2020–2021	→ Austria Klagenfurt (loan)	23	(0)
2022–2025	Austria Klagenfurt	53	(0)
2025–2026	Energie Cottbus	20	(0)
2026–	Dynamo Dresden	0	(0)
- * Club domestic league appearances and goals as of 28 May 2026

Simon Straudi (born 27 January 1999) is an Italian professional footballer who plays as a right-back or attacking midfielder for German 2. Bundesliga club Dynamo Dresden.

== Career ==
Born in Bruneck in the Italian autonomous province of South Tyrol, Straudi started his career with local side F.C. Südtirol of the Italian third division, making the bench on two occasions at the age of 17.

In 2016, he signed for SV Werder Bremen in the Bundesliga.

In 2020, Straudi moved on loan to Austrian second division club Austria Klagenfurt.

On 7 July 2022, Straudi returned to Austria Klagenfurt on a two-year contract.

On 15 September 2025, Straudi signed for German club Energie Cottbus, becoming their first ever Italian player.

On 22 June 2026, Straudi moved to 2. Bundesliga club Dynamo Dresden.

== Personal life ==
His brother, Fabian, also plays for Werder Bremen.
