= Jonas Kühn =

German footballer

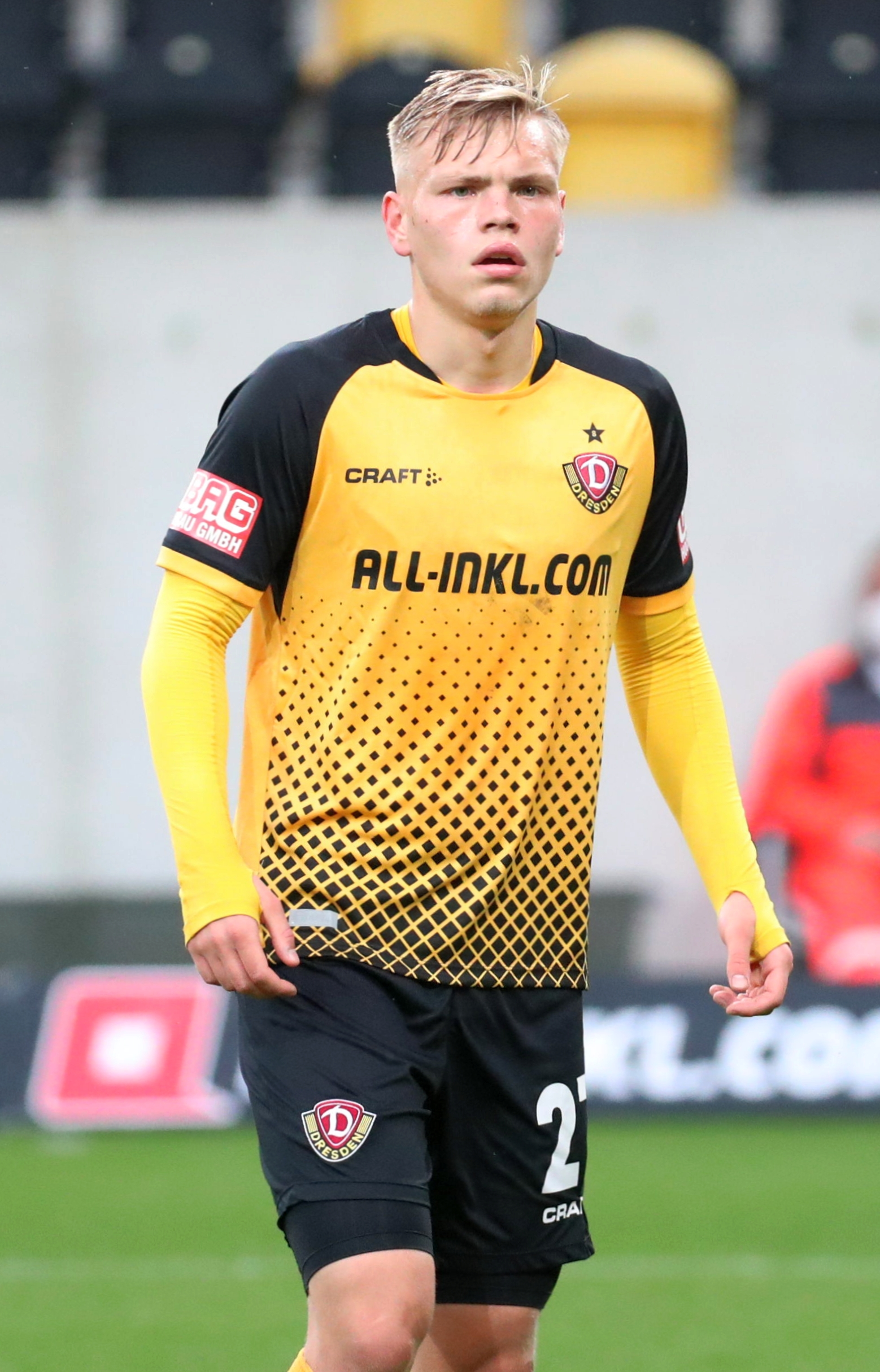
- Jonas Kühn (2021)

Personal information
- Date of birth: 20 March 2002 (age 24)
- Place of birth: Plauen, Germany
- Height: 1.80 m (5 ft 11 in)
- Positions: Left midfielder; left back

Team information
- Current team: FSV Luckenwalde
- Number: 24

Youth career
- –2018: VFC Plauen
- 2018–2021: Dynamo Dresden

Senior career*
Years	Team	Apps	(Gls)
2021–2022	Dynamo Dresden	2	(0)
2021–2022	→ Sonnenhof Großaspach (loan)	27	(0)
2022–2024	Viktoria Berlin	30	(1)
2024–2025	Austria Klagenfurt	9	(0)
2025–	FSV Luckenwalde	32	(0)
- * Club domestic league appearances and goals as of 23 September 2026

Jonas Kühn (born 20 March 2002) is a German footballer who plays as a left midfielder or left back for German club FSV Luckenwalde.

== Early life ==
Kühn was born in Plauen.

== Career ==
Having played youth football with VFC Plauen, Kühn joined Dynamo Dresden's youth team in 2018. In December 2020, he signed a professional contract with the club, active from summer 2021. He made his debut for the club as a substitute in a 3–0 3. Liga defeat at home to Hallescher FC on 24 April 2021. In August 2021, he joined Sonnenhof Großaspach on loan for the 2021–22 season.

Before the 2024–25 season, Kühn signed a two-year contract with Austria Klagenfurt.
