= Florian Jaritz =

Austrian association footballer (born 1997)

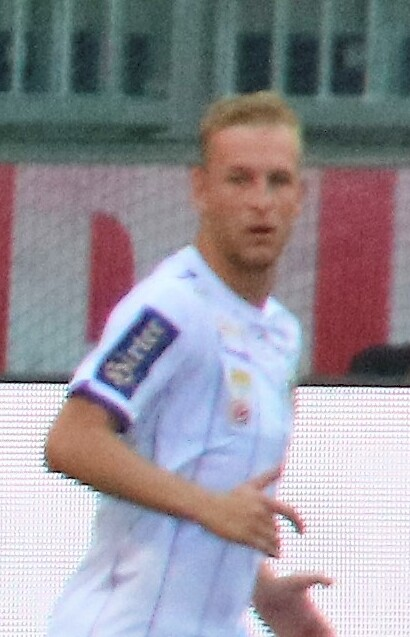
- Jaritz in 2021

Personal information
- Date of birth: 18 October 1997 (age 29)
- Place of birth: Klagenfurt, Austria
- Height: 1.63 m (5 ft 4 in)
- Position: Winger

Team information
- Current team: Austria Klagenfurt
- Number: 7

Youth career
- 2003–2005: SV Moosburg
- 2005–2007: FC Carinthia
- 2007: SV Moosburg
- 2007–2010: Austria Kärnten
- 2010–2014: Austria Klagenfurt
- 2014–2015: Wolfsberger AC
- 2015–2016: Austria Klagenfurt

Senior career*
Years	Team	Apps	(Gls)
2016–	Austria Klagenfurt	234	(27)
- * Club domestic league appearances and goals as of 17 May 2026

Florian Jaritz (born 18 October 1997) is an Austrian professional footballer who plays as a winger for Austria Klagenfurt.

== Career ==
Jaritz is a youth product of SV Moosburg, FC Carinthia, Austria Kärnten, Austria Klagenfurt, and Wolfsberger AC. He began his senior career with Austria Klagenfurt in 2016, and helped the club get promoted from the Austrian Regionalliga to the Austrian Football Bundesliga. He made his professional debut with Austria Klagenfurt in a 4–1 2. Liga loss to Kapfenberger SV on 1 April 2016. On 23 May 2022, he extended his contract to 2024 with the club.

== Personal life ==
Jaritz is a fan of the German club Borussia Dortmund.
