= Jonas Arweiler =

German footballer (born 1997)

Personal information
- Date of birth: 10 April 1997 (age 29)
- Place of birth: Püttlingen, Germany
- Height: 1.88 m (6 ft 2 in)
- Position: Forward

Team information
- Current team: 1. FC Köln II
- Number: 9

Youth career
- 1. FC Riegelsberg
- –2013: 1. FC Saarbrücken
- 2013–2016: Borussia Dortmund

Senior career*
Years	Team	Apps	(Gls)
2016–2018	Borussia Dortmund II	41	(5)
2018–2020	Jong Utrecht	55	(15)
2019–2021	Utrecht	3	(1)
2020–2021	→ ADO Den Haag (loan)	25	(3)
2021–2022	Almere City	32	(10)
2022–2024	Austria Klagenfurt	45	(4)
2024–2026	SC Verl	63	(17)
2026–	1. FC Köln II	6	(2)

International career^{‡}
2012	Germany U16	1	(0)
2016–2017	Germany U20	7	(1)
- * Club domestic league appearances and goals as of 23 September 2026 ‡ National team caps and goals as of 11 September 2018

Jonas Arweiler (born 10 April 1997) is a German professional footballer who plays as a forward for Regionalliga West side 1. FC Köln II, the reserve team of 1. FC Köln.

== Club career ==
=== Borussia Dortmund II ===
Arweiler began playing football with 1. FC Riegelsberg and 1. FC Saarbrücken. Prior to the 2013–14 season he joined the under-17 team of Borussia Dortmund, and he was promoted to the under-19s the following season. While playing for the Dortmund youth teams, he competed in the UEFA Youth League. In March 2016, Arweiler made his first appearances for the reserves in the Regionalliga. From the 2016–17 season, he was a permanent member of the reserve team. In the 2016–17 season, he made 30 appearances in which he scored five goals. In the 2017–18 season, he made ten times in the Regionalliga.

=== Utrecht ===
On 23 May 2018, Arweiler signed a two-year contract with Eredivisie club FC Utrecht, including an option for another two years. He was set to join the reserve team, Jong FC Utrecht. At Jong Utrecht, he made his professional debut in the Eerste Divisie on 17 August 2018 against the Go Ahead Eagles, starting in the 5–0 defeat. In the 2018–19 season, he made a total of 29 appearances in the second tier, in which he scored five goals.

Arweiler made his debut in the Eredivisie on 23 February 2020 when he came on as a substitute for Jean-Christophe Bahebeck in the 74th minute against FC Twente. Only twelve minutes after coming off the bench, he scored his first goal in the top division to secure a 2–1 win. Until the season was cancelled due to the COVID-19 pandemic in the Netherlands in the 2019–20 season, he made three appearances in the Eredivisie and 26 in the Eerste Divisie for Jong Utrecht, where he scored ten goals.

On 24 August 2020, Arweiler was sent on a one-season loan to Eredivisie rivals ADO Den Haag. For ADO he made 25 appearances in the Eredivisie, as the club suffered relegation to the second tier.

=== Almere City ===
Ahead of the 2021–22 season, Arweiler did not return to Utrecht, but moved permanently to second division club Almere City on a three-year deal. In Almere he made 32 league appearances and scored 10 goals.

=== Austria Klagenfurt ===
After four seasons in the Netherlands, Arweiler joined Austrian Bundesliga club Austria Klagenfurt on 9 July 2022, signing a two-year contract.

=== Verl ===
On 30 July 2024, Arweiler signed with SC Verl in 3. Liga.

== International career ==
Arweiler is a German youth international, having appeared for his country at under-16 and under-20 level.

== Career statistics ==
As of match played 12 November 2023

Appearances and goals by club, season and competition
Club	Season	League			National cup		Other		Total	
Club	Season	Division	Apps	Goals	Apps	Goals	Apps	Goals	Apps	Goals
Borussia Dortmund II	2015–16	Regionalliga West	1	0	—		—		1	0
Borussia Dortmund II	2016–17	Regionalliga West	30	5	—		—		30	5
Borussia Dortmund II	2017–18	Regionalliga West	10	0	—		—		10	0
Borussia Dortmund II	Total		41	5	—		—		41	5
Jong FC Utrecht	2018–19	Eerste Divisie	29	5	—		—		29	5
Jong FC Utrecht	2019–20	Eerste Divisie	26	10	—		—		26	10
Jong FC Utrecht	Total		55	15	—		—		55	15
Utrecht	2019–20	Eredivisie	3	1	0	0	0	0	3	1
ADO Den Haag (loan)	2020–21	Eredivisie	25	3	1	0	0	0	26	3
Almere City	2021–22	Eerste Divisie	32	10	1	0	0	0	33	10
Austria Klagenfurt	2022–23	Austrian Bundesliga	20	3	3	2	—		23	5
Austria Klagenfurt	2023–24	Austrian Bundesliga	14	0	3	1	—		17	1
Austria Klagenfurt	Total		34	3	6	3	—		40	6
Career total			190	37	8	3	0	0	198	40
