= Tobias Koch (footballer) =

Austrian footballer

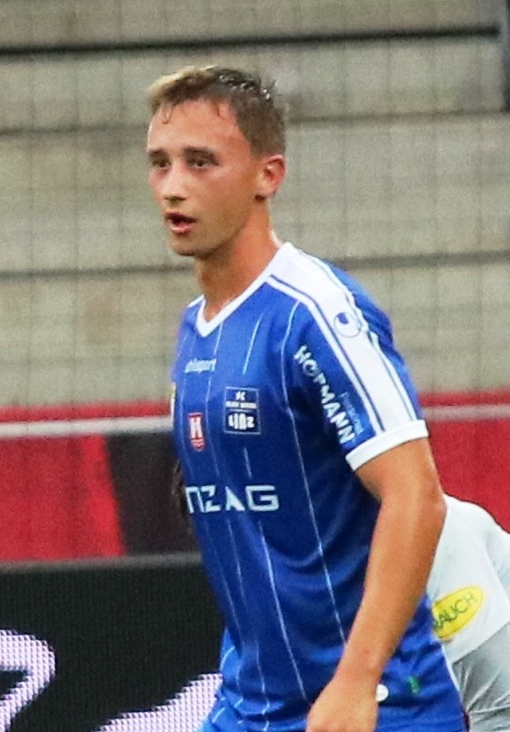
- Koch in 2020

Personal information
- Date of birth: 6 April 2001 (age 25)
- Place of birth: Eisenstadt, Austria
- Height: 1.80 m (5 ft 11 in)
- Position: Midfielder

Team information
- Current team: Grazer AK
- Number: 8

Youth career
- 2006–2008: SV Straß
- 2008–2014: TUS St. Veit am Vogau
- 2014–2017: Fußballcollege Leibnitz
- 2015–2017: → Sturm Graz
- 2017–2018: Sturm Graz

Senior career*
Years	Team	Apps	(Gls)
2018–2021	Sturm Graz II	41	(2)
2018–2021	Sturm Graz	3	(0)
2020	→ SV Lafnitz (loan)	9	(0)
2021	→ SV Lafnitz (loan)	15	(0)
2021–2024	Blau-Weiß Linz	76	(8)
2024–2025	Austria Klagenfurt	27	(1)
2025–	Grazer AK	27	(0)

International career
2016	Austria U15	6	(0)
2016–2017	Austria U16	10	(1)
2017–2018	Austria U17	11	(1)
2019	Austria U18	2	(0)
2020	Austria U19	3	(0)
- * Club domestic league appearances and goals as of 10 June 2026

Tobias Koch (born 6 April 2001) is an Austrian professional footballer who plays for Grazer AK.

== Club career ==
Koch began his career at SV Straß. In 2008 he moved to the youth team of TuS St. Veit / Vogau. In 2014 he came to the Leibnitz Football College, where he played until 2017. From 2015 he was also used in the academy of SK Sturm Graz. In October 2017 he finally switched permanently to Sturm and received a professional contract with the Grazers that ran until June 2019.

In May 2018 he made his debut for the amateurs of Graz in the Austrian Regionalliga when he was in the starting line-up against FC Juniors OÖ on matchday 28 of the 2017/18 season and was replaced by Christoph Urdl in the 57th minute. In the same month he was on the bench for the first time for Sturm's professional team against SCR Altach.

For the 2018/19 season, he was promoted to Sturm's first team. In September 2018 he scored his first goal for the amateurs in the third-highest division in a 2–2 draw against FC Wels. In October 2018, his contract, which expired at the end of the season, was extended prematurely with an unknown term. In April 2019, he made his professional debut in the Austrian Bundesliga when he came on as a substitute for Sandi Lovrič on matchday 25 against FC Red Bull Salzburg in the 74th minute. This was his only appearance in that season.

In January 2020 he was loaned out to SV Lafnitz on a cooperation basis where he both could play for Lafnitz and for Sturm's second team. He made nine appearances in the Austrian Football Second League during the loan.

On 30 June 2021, he signed a two-year contract with Blau-Weiß Linz.

Before the 2024–25 season, Koch signed a three-year contract with Austria Klagenfurt.

On 17 June 2025, Koch joined Grazer AK for an undisclosed fee, signing a two-year contract.
