= Jannik Robatsch =

Austrian footballer (born 2004)

Personal information
- Full name: Jannik Thomas Robatsch
- Date of birth: 28 December 2004 (age 21)
- Place of birth: Villach, Austria
- Height: 1.90 m (6 ft 3 in)
- Position: Centre-back

Team information
- Current team: Beveren (on loan from FC St. Pauli)
- Number: 48

Youth career
- 2009–2018: ATUS Velden
- 2018–2019: Wolfsberger AC
- 2019–2020: ATUS Velden
- 2020–2022: Austria Klagenfurt

Senior career*
Years	Team	Apps	(Gls)
2022–2023	Austria Klagenfurt II	20	(2)
2022–2025	Austria Klagenfurt	41	(1)
2025–	FC St. Pauli	0	(0)
2026–	→ Beveren (loan)	1	(0)

International career^{‡}
2025–	Austria U21	1	(0)
- * Club domestic league appearances and goals as of 23 August 2026 ‡ National team caps and goals as of 15:26, 7 July 2025 (UTC)

Jannik Thomas Robatsch (born 28 December 2004) is an Austrian professional footballer who plays as a centre-back for Belgian Pro League club Beveren, on loan from 2. Bundesliga club FC St. Pauli.

== Club career ==
Robatsch is a youth product of ATUS Velden and Wolfsberger AC, before moving to Austria Klagenfurt in 2020 to finish his development. In 2022, he was promoted to Austria Klagenfurt's reserves. He made his senior debut with Austria Klagenfurt in a 5–0 Austrian Cup win over Schwarz-Weiß Bregenz on 31 August 2022. On 17 May 2023, he signed his first professional contract with the club. On 3 April 2024, he extended his contract with Austria Klagenfurt until 2028. On 6 June 2025, he transferred to the German Bundesliga side FC St. Pauli. On 21 August 2026, Robatsch joined Belgian Pro League side Beveren on a season-long loan.

== International career ==
In March 2021, Robatsch received his first call-up to the Austria U21s for a set of friendlies.
