= Simon Spari =

Austria footballer (born 2002)

- Spari in 2026

Personal information
- Full name: Simon Emil Spari
- Date of birth: 16 June 2002 (age 24)
- Place of birth: Graz, Austria
- Height: 1.96 m (6 ft 5 in)
- Position: Goalkeeper

Team information
- Current team: FC St. Pauli
- Number: 30

Youth career
- 2008–2011: Gratkorn
- 2011–2012: Sturm Graz
- 2012–2015: Gratkorn
- 2015–2019: Sturm Graz
- 2019–2021: Karlsruher SC

Senior career*
Years	Team	Apps	(Gls)
2021–2024	Floridsdorfer AC	57	(0)
2024–2025	Austria Klagenfurt	27	(0)
2025–	FC St. Pauli	0	(0)

International career^{‡}
2022–2024	Austria U21	5	(0)
- * Club domestic league appearances and goals as of 15:26, 7 July 2025 (UTC) ‡ National team caps and goals as of 15:26, 7 July 2025 (UTC)

Simon Emil Spari (born 16 June 2002) is an Austrian professional footballer who plays as a goalkeeper for 2. Bundesliga club FC St. Pauli.

== Club career ==
Spari is a youth product of the Austrian clubs Gratkorn and Sturm Graz, and the German club Karlsruher SC. On 19 June 2021, he joined Floridsdorfer AC in the 2. Liga where he began his senior career. On 25 April 2023, FAC used their option to extend his contract another season. On 8 August 2024, he transferred to Austria Klagenfurt in the Austrian Football Bundesliga on a contract until 2026. After Klagenfurt was relegated, he transferred to the Bundesliga side FC St. Pauli on 19 June 2025.

== International career ==
Spari has played for the Austria U21s, having played in a set of 2025 UEFA European Under-21 Championship qualification matches in October 2024.

== Career statistics ==
=== Club ===
As of match played 23 May 2025

Appearances and goals by club, season and competition
Club	Season	League			National cup		Other		Total	
Club	Season	Division	Apps	Goals	Apps	Goals	Apps	Goals	Apps	Goals
Floridsdorfer AC	2021–22	2. Liga	2	0	2	0	—		4	0
Floridsdorfer AC	2022–23	2. Liga	28	0	3	0	—		31	0
Floridsdorfer AC	2023–24	2. Liga	27	0	2	0	—		29	0
Floridsdorfer AC	Total		57	0	7	0	—		64	0
Austria Klagenfurt	2024–25	Austrian Bundesliga	27	0	2	0	—		29	0
FC St. Pauli	2025–26	Bundesliga	0	0	0	0	—		0	0
Career total			84	0	9	0	0	0	93	0
