= Ben Bobzien =

German footballer (born 2003)

Personal information
- Full name: Ben Justus Bobzien
- Date of birth: 29 April 2003 (age 23)
- Place of birth: Giessen, Germany
- Height: 1.74 m (5 ft 9 in)
- Position: Striker

Team information
- Current team: Dynamo Dresden
- Number: 20

Youth career
- –2022: Mainz 05

Senior career*
Years	Team	Apps	(Gls)
2021–2026	Mainz 05	1	(0)
2021–2026	Mainz 05 II	30	(9)
2023	→ SV Elversberg (loan)	14	(0)
2023–2024	→ Austria Lustenau (loan)	27	(1)
2024–2025	→ Austria Klagenfurt (loan)	31	(9)
2026	→ Dynamo Dresden (loan)	15	(4)
2026–	Dynamo Dresden	0	(0)

International career^{‡}
2021–2022	Germany U19	8	(3)
2022–2024	Germany U20	13	(2)
- * Club domestic league appearances and goals as of 17 July 2026 ‡ National team caps and goals as of 25 March 2024

Ben Justus Bobzien (born 29 April 2003) is a German professional footballer who plays as a forward for 2. Bundesliga club Dynamo Dresden.

== Early life ==
Bobzien is a native of Giessen, Germany. He is of American descent, with a grandfather from Atlanta.

== Club career ==
Bobzien started his career with German Bundesliga side Mainz 05. He debuted for the club during a 3–0 win over VfB Lübeck. In 2023, he was sent on loan to German side SV Elversberg. In 2023, he was sent on loan to Austrian side Austria Lustenau.

For the 2024–25 season, he moved on loan to Austria Klagenfurt.

On 23 January 2026, Bobzien was loaned to Dynamo Dresden until the end of the season. He then permanently transferred to Dynamo Dresden on 17 July 2026.

== International career ==
Bobzien has represented Germany internationally at youth level.

== Style of play ==
Bonzien mainly operates as a forward.

== Career statistics ==
As of match played on 17 May 2026

Appearances and goals by club, season and competition
Club	Season	League			National cup		Europe		Other		Total	
Club	Season	Division	Apps	Goals	Apps	Goals	Apps	Goals	Apps	Goals	Apps	Goals
Mainz 05	2020–21	Bundesliga	0	0	0	0	—		—		0	0
Mainz 05	2022–23	Bundesliga	0	0	1	0	—		—		1	0
Mainz 05	2025–26	Bundesliga	1	0	1	0	3 (Note: Appearances in UEFA Conference League)	0	—		5	0
Mainz 05	2026–27	Bundesliga	0	0	0	0	—		—		0	0
Mainz 05	Total		1	0	2	0	3	0	—		6	0
Mainz 05 II	2020–21	Regionalliga Südwest	1	0	—		—		—		1	0
Mainz 05 II	2021–22	Regionalliga Südwest	13	5	—		—		—		13	5
Mainz 05 II	2022–23	Regionalliga Südwest	15	4	—		—		—		15	4
Mainz 05 II	2025–26	Regionalliga Südwest	1	0	—		—		—		1	0
Mainz 05 II	Total		30	9	—		—		—		30	9
SV Elversberg (loan)	2022–23	3. Liga	14	0	0	0	—		3 (Note: Appearances in Saarland Cup)	2	17	2
Austria Lustenau (loan)	2023–24	Austrian Bundesliga	27	1	1	0	—		—		28	1
Austria Klagenfurt (loan)	2024–25	Austrian Bundesliga	31	9	3	3	—		—		34	12
Dynamo Dresden (loan)	2025–26	2. Bundesliga	15	4	—		—		—		15	4
Career total			119	23	6	3	2	0	3	2	130	28
