= Christopher Wernitznig =

Austrian footballer (born 1990)

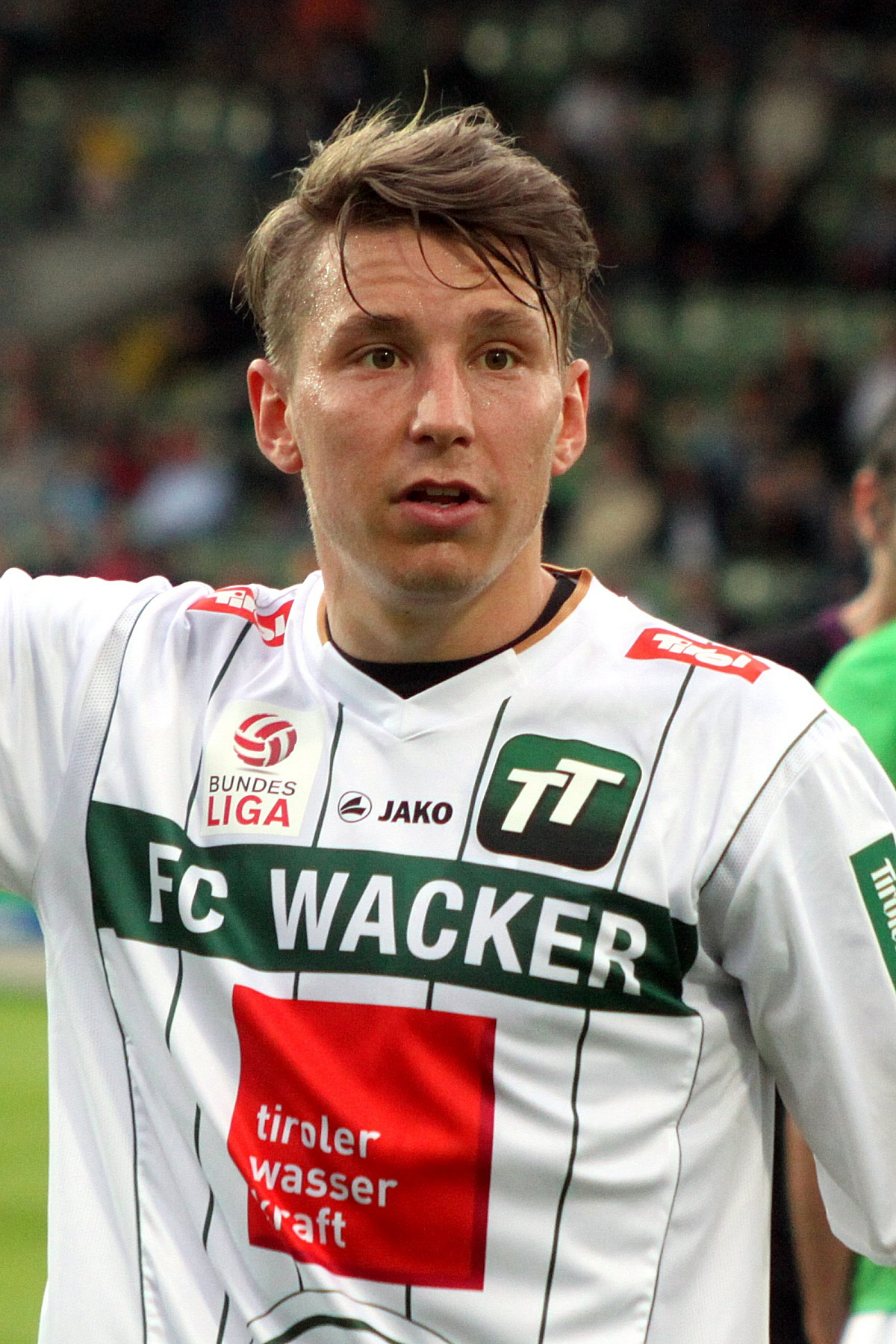

Personal information
- Date of birth: 24 February 1990 (age 36)
- Place of birth: Villach, Austria
- Height: 1.79 m (5 ft 10 in)
- Position: Midfielder

Team information
- Current team: Hertha Wels
- Number: 24

Senior career*
Years	Team	Apps	(Gls)
2007–2008	Villacher SV	33	(5)
2008–2009	SV Spittal	20	(1)
2009–2010	Villacher SV	46	(20)
2011–2014	Wacker Innsbruck	94	(16)
2014–2022	Wolfsberger AC	231	(20)
2022–2025	Austria Klagenfurt	87	(6)
2025–2026	SV Ried	10	(0)
2026–	Hertha Wels	3	(0)

International career^{‡}
2012	Austria U21	1	(0)
- * Club domestic league appearances and goals as of 14 August 2026 ‡ National team caps and goals as of 14 February 2015

Christopher Wernitznig (born 24 February 1990) is an Austrian professional footballer who plays as a midfielder for Hertha Wels in the 2. Liga.
