= Christopher Cvetko =

Austrian footballer

Personal information
- Date of birth: 2 April 1997 (age 29)
- Place of birth: Klagenfurt, Austria
- Height: 1.82 m (6 ft 0 in)
- Position: Midfielder

Team information
- Current team: Grazer AK
- Number: 24

Youth career
- 2003–2007: Kärnten
- 2007–2010: Austria Kärnten
- 2010–2013: AKA Kärnten
- 2013–2016: Bolton Wanderers

Senior career*
Years	Team	Apps	(Gls)
2016–2018	Blau-Weiß Linz	29	(0)
2018–2020	Juniors OÖ	51	(5)
2019–2020	→ LASK	0	(0)
2020–2025	Austria Klagenfurt	140	(9)
2025–2026	Blau-Weiß Linz	24	(1)
2026–	Grazer AK	0	(0)

International career
2014	Austria U-17	4	(0)
2014–2015	Austria U-18	7	(0)
2016	Austria U-19	3	(0)
- * Club domestic league appearances and goals as of 7 September 2026

Christopher Cvetko (born 2 April 1997) is an Austrian football player. He plays for Austrian Bundesliga club Grazer AK.

== Club career ==
He made his Austrian Football First League debut for FC Blau-Weiß Linz on 10 March 2017 in a game against SC Austria Lustenau.

On 17 August 2020, Cvetko signed for Austria Klagenfurt.

On 19 June 2025, Cvetko returned to Blau-Weiß Linz.

On 4 September 2026, Cvetko joined Grazer AK on a one-year deal following his release from Blau-Weiß Linz.
