= Lukas Ibertsberger =

Austrian footballer

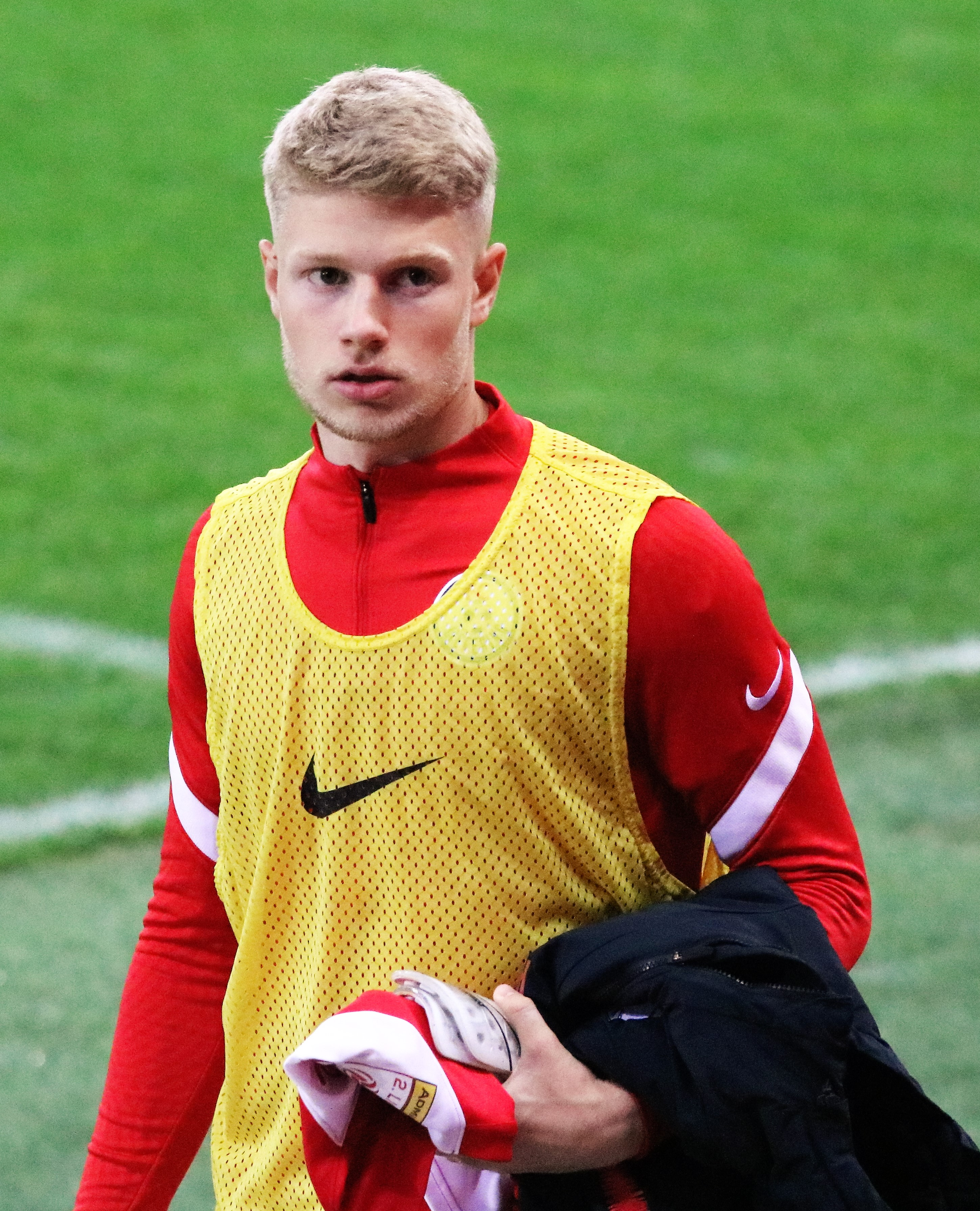

Personal information
- Date of birth: 6 August 2003 (age 23)
- Height: 1.81 m (5 ft 11 in)
- Position: Defender

Team information
- Current team: Austria Lustenau
- Number: 26

Youth career
- 2012–2014: SV Seekirchen 1945
- 2014–2015: FC Liefering
- 2015–2021: Red Bull Salzburg

Senior career*
Years	Team	Apps	(Gls)
2021–2023	FC Liefering	39	(1)
2023–2024	Red Bull Salzburg	0	(0)
2023	→ Wolfsberger AC II (loan)	2	(0)
2023–2024	→ Wolfsberger AC (loan)	13	(0)
2024–2025	FC Blau-Weiß Linz	4	(0)
2025–	Austria Lustenau	27	(0)

International career^{‡}
2018–2019	Austria U16	8	(0)
2019	Austria U17	2	(0)
2021	Austria U18	1	(0)
2022–2023	Austria U21	8	(0)
- * Club domestic league appearances and goals as of 15 August 2026 ‡ National team caps and goals as of 17 October 2023

Lukas Ibertsberger (born 6 August 2003) is an Austrian professional footballer who plays as a defender for Austrian Bundesliga club Austria Lustenau. He is the son of former Austrian international Robert Ibertsberger.

== Club career ==
On 30 June 2023, Ibertsberger joined Wolfsberger AC on a season-long loan.

== Career statistics ==
=== Club ===
As of 22 October 2021.

Appearances and goals by club, season and competition
Club	Season	League			Cup		Continental		Other		Total	
Club	Season	Division	Apps	Goals	Apps	Goals	Apps	Goals	Apps	Goals	Apps	Goals
FC Liefering	2021–22	2. Liga	2	0	0	0	–		0	0	2	0
Career total			2	0	0	0	0	0	0	0	2	0
