= Nicolas Wimmer =

Austrian association footballer

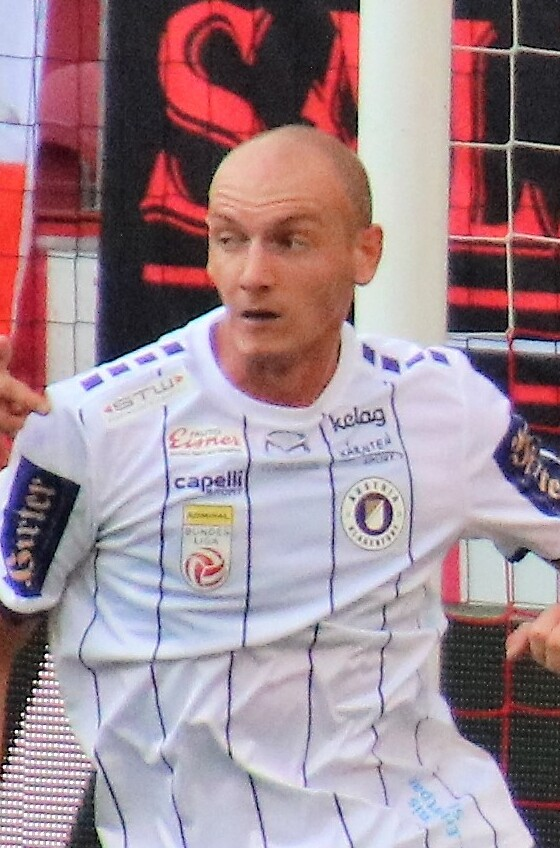
- Wimmer in 2021

Personal information
- Date of birth: 15 March 1995 (age 31)
- Place of birth: Austria
- Height: 1.90 m (6 ft 3 in)
- Position: Centre-back

Team information
- Current team: Wolfsberger AC
- Number: 37

Youth career
- 2000–2003: Union Pichling
- 2003–2009: LASK
- 2009–2012: Ried

Senior career*
Years	Team	Apps	(Gls)
2012–2015	ASKÖ Donau Linz II	10	(3)
2012–2016	ASKÖ Donau Linz	91	(5)
2016–2021	Vorwärts Steyr	89	(11)
2021	Blau-Weiß Linz	17	(4)
2021–2024	Austria Klagenfurt	82	(4)
2024–	Wolfsberger AC	58	(1)
- * Club domestic league appearances and goals as of 10 June 2026

Nicolas Wimmer (born 15 March 1995) is an Austrian professional footballer who plays as a centre-back for Wolfsberger AC.

== Career ==
Wimmer is a product of the youth academies of Union Pichling, LASK and Ried. He began his senior career with ASKÖ Donau Linz in 2012 in the Austrian fourth division. After 91 appearances there, he transferred to Vorwärts Steyr and helped them gain promotion to the 2. Liga. He made his professional debut with Vorwärts Steyr in a 1–1 2. Liga tie with SV Ried on 27 July 2018. On 8 February 2021, he transferred to Blau-Weiß Linz. He helped them win the 2. Liga, and was named as part of the league's team of the season. He transferred to Austria Klagenfurt on 30 June 2021, signing a 3-year contract.

On 22 June 2024, Wimmer signed with Wolfsberger AC.
