= Nikola Đorić =

Serbian footballer (born 2000)

Personal information
- Date of birth: 3 March 2000 (age 26)
- Place of birth: Belgrade, Serbia
- Height: 1.92 m (6 ft 4 in)
- Position: Centre-back

Team information
- Current team: Trayal Kruševac
- Number: 15

Youth career
- 2010–2019: Rad

Senior career*
Years	Team	Apps	(Gls)
2019–2022	Rad	42	(1)
2019	→ Železničar Pančevo (loan)	6	(1)
2020	→ Sinđelić Beograd (loan)	8	(0)
2022–2024	Austria Klagenfurt	24	(0)
2023	→ Šibenik (loan)	14	(0)
2025	Hegelmann	22	(1)
2026–	Trayal Kruševac	1	(0)
- * Club domestic league appearances and goals as of 14 May 2026

Nikola Đorić (Serbian Cyrillic: Никола Ђорић, born 3 March 2000) is a Serbian professional footballer who plays as a centre-back for Trayal Kruševac.

== Career ==
Đorić is a youth product of FK Rad since the age of 10 and began his senior career with them in 2019. He shortly after joined Železničar Pančevo on loan in the Serbian third division for the first half of the 2019-20 season, before returning to Rad. For the second half of the season, he joined Sinđelić Beograd in the Serbian First League. On 15 June 2022, he transferred to the Austrian Football Bundesliga with Austria Klagenfurt.

On 23 January 2023, Đorić was loaned to Šibenik in Croatia.

On 15 January 2025 he signed with Lithuanian club Hegelmann.

On 15 December 2025 officially announced, that Hegelmann Club left Arijus Bražinskas, Yanis Azouazi and Nikola Đorić.
