= 2024–25 Wolfsberger AC season =

Wolfsberger AC
2024–25 season
- Chairman: Dietmar Riegler
- Manager: Dietmar Kühbauer
- Stadium: Lavanttal-Arena
- Austrian Football Bundesliga: 4th
- Austrian Cup: Winners
- Top goalscorer: League: Thierno Ballo; Dejan Zukić (10 each); All: Thierno Ballo (13 goals)
- Average home league attendance: 4,219
Home colours	Away colours

The 2024–25 season was the 94th season in the history of Wolfsberger AC. In addition to the domestic league, the team participated in the Austrian Cup.

On 1 May 2025, Wolfsberg defeated TSV Hartberg in the final of the Austrian Cup to secure a first ever major trophy for the club.

== Current squad ==
As of 6 February 2025

Note: Flags indicate national team as defined under FIFA eligibility rules; some limited exceptions apply. Players may hold more than one non-FIFA nationality.

No.	Pos.	Nation	Player
1	GK	AUT	Lukas Gütlbauer
2	DF	SRB	Boris Matić
3	DF	AUT	Jonathan Scherzer
5	DF	CIV	Cheick Mamadou Diabaté
7	MF	AUT	Angelo Gattermayer
8	DF	AUT	Simon Piesinger
9	FW	CIV	Sankara Karamoko
10	FW	AUT	Thomas Sabitzer
11	MF	AUT	Thierno Ballo
12	GK	AUT	Nikolas Polster
14	MF	AUT	Pascal Müller
17	MF	GHA	David Atanga
19	MF	GEO	Sandro Altunashvili
20	MF	SRB	Dejan Zukić
21	GK	AUT	David Skubl

No.	Pos.	Nation	Player
22	DF	AUT	Dominik Baumgartner
27	MF	NGA	Chibuike Nwaiwu
30	MF	CIV	Claude Kouakou
31	DF	AUT	Maximilian Ullmann
32	FW	AUT	Markus Pink
34	MF	GHA	Emmanuel Agyemang
37	DF	AUT	Nicolas Wimmer
44	MF	AUT	Ervin Omić
47	FW	SVN	Erik Kojzek
77	MF	AUT	Maximilian Scharfetter
97	MF	BIH	Adis Jašić
—	MF	CIV	Anderson Niangbo
—	MF	AUT	Alessandro Schöpf
—	MF	CIV	Abou Sylla

=== Out on loan ===
Note: Flags indicate national team as defined under FIFA eligibility rules; some limited exceptions apply. Players may hold more than one non-FIFA nationality.

No.	Pos.	Nation	Player
—	MF	AUT	Tobias Gruber (on loan to SKU Amstetten) until 30 June 2025

== Competitions ==
=== Austrian Football Bundesliga ===
==== League table ====
Pos	Team	Pld	W	D	L	GF	GA	GD	Pts	Qualification
2	Austria Wien	22	14	4	4	36	19	+17	46	Qualification for the Championship round
3	Red Bull Salzburg	22	10	8	4	33	22	+11	38	Qualification for the Championship round
4	Wolfsberg	22	11	3	8	44	30	+14	36	Qualification for the Championship round
5	Rapid Wien	22	9	7	6	32	24	+8	34	Qualification for the Championship round
6	Blau-Weiß Linz	22	10	3	9	30	29	+1	33	Qualification for the Championship round

Source: Austrian Football Bundesliga
Rules for classification: 1) Points; 2) Head-to-head record; 3) Goal difference; 4) Goals scored; 5) Matches won; 6) Away matches won; 7) Away goals scored.

Pos	Team	Pld	W	D	L	GF	GA	GD	Pts	Qualification	STU	RBS	AWI	WAC	RWI	BWL
2	Red Bull Salzburg	32	16	9	7	53	36	+17	38	Qualification for the Champions League second qualifying round	1–2	—	2–0	1–1	4–2	2–1
3	Austria Wien	32	18	6	8	47	32	+15	37	Qualification for the Conference League second qualifying round	2–1	1–3	—	0–0	1–2	2–2
4	Wolfsberg	32	16	7	9	60	38	+22	37	Qualification for the Europa League third qualifying round (Note: The 2024–25 Austrian Cup winners (Wolfsberg) qualify for the Europa League third qualifying round.)	1–1	2–1	1–2	—	5–1	2–0
5	Rapid Wien (O)	32	12	8	12	43	42	+1	27	Qualification for the Conference League play-offs	3–1	0–2	2–0	0–1	—	0–0
6	Blau-Weiß Linz	32	11	5	16	37	45	−8	21		0–1	1–2	0–2	1–2	2–1	—

Source: Austrian Football Bundesliga
Rules for classification: 1) Points; 2) Points with (possible) half points subtracted due to rounding; 3) Head-to-head points; 4) Head-to-head goal difference; 5) Head-to-head goals scored; 6) Goal difference; 7) Goals scored; 8) Matches won; 9) Away matches won; 10) Away goals scored.
(O) Play-off winners
Notes:

Pos	Team	Pld	W	D	L	GF	GA	GD	Pts	Qualification	LSK	HAR	TIR	GAK	ALT	AKL
1	LASK	32	16	6	10	51	36	+15	38	Qualification for the Conference League play-offs	—	0–0	2–0	1–0	0–0	6–0
2	TSV Hartberg	32	11	11	10	40	40	0	31	Qualification for the Conference League play-offs	0–1	—	3–2	1–1	2–0	2–3
3	WSG Tirol	32	7	9	16	35	50	−15	20		1–3	1–3	—	1–1	1–0	5–3
4	Grazer AK	32	5	13	14	34	54	−20	20		1–0	0–3	0–0	—	1–0	1–1
5	Rheindorf Altach	32	5	11	16	29	46	−17	18		0–2	1–1	3–0	2–2	—	0–0
6	Austria Klagenfurt (R)	32	6	9	17	33	70	−37	16	Relegation to Austrian Football Second League	1–4	0–1	1–4	0–0	2–3	—

Source: Austrian Football Bundesliga
Rules for classification: 1) Points; 2) Points with (possible) half points subtracted due to rounding; 3) Head-to-head points; 4) Head-to-head goal difference; 5) Head-to-head goals scored; 6) Goal difference; 7) Goals scored; 8) Matches won; 9) Away matches won; 10) Away goals scored.
(R) Relegated

==== Results summary ====
Overall								Home						Away					
Pld	W	D	L	GF	GA	GD	Pts	W	D	L	GF	GA	GD	W	D	L	GF	GA	GD
0	0	0	0	0	0	0	0	0	0	0	0	0	0	0	0	0	0	0	0

Source: ADMIRAL Bundesliga

==== Results by round ====
Round	1
Ground	
Result	
Position	

Source: ADMIRAL Bundesliga
A = Away; H = Home; W = Win; D = Draw; L = Loss; P = Postponed

=== Austrian Cup ===
26 July 2024 First round	ASV Draßburg	0–7	Wolfsberg	Draßburg
19ː00 CEST (UTC+2)		Report	Etzelsdorfer 5' (o.g.); Sabitzer 24'; Ballo 32'; Gattermayer 43'; Kojzek 69', 87'; Agyemang 85'	Stadium: Sportplatz; Attendance: 510; Referee: Gabriel Gmeiner

28 August 2024 Second round	SV Wallern	0–2	Wolfsberg	Wallern
19:30 CEST (UTC+2)		Report	Zukić 47'; Ballo 72'	Stadium: Sportanlage Wallern; Attendance: 600; Referee: Patrick Koscielnicki

30 October 2024 Round of 16	Wolfsberg	2–2 (a.e.t.) (9–8 p)	SK Austria Klagenfurt	Wolfsberg
20:30 CET	Gütlbauer (yellow card) 14'; Baumgartner (yellow card) 14'; Agyemang (yellow card) 50'; Sabitzer (yellow card) 66' (goal) 70' (Agyemang); Ballo 95' (Karamoko); Omić (yellow card) 118'	Report	Toshevski 15' (pen); Dehl (yellow card) 63'; Robatsch (yellow card) 90+1' (goal) 111' (Mahrer)	Stadium: Lavanttal-Arena; Attendance: 2,651; Referee: Safak Barmaksiz
	Penalties
	Jašić (penalty missed); Omić (penalty scored); Baumgartner (penalty scored); Altunashvili (penalty scored); Piesinger (penalty scored); Karamoko (penalty scored); Matić (penalty scored); Ballo (penalty scored); Ullmann (penalty scored); Wimmer (penalty scored)		(penalty scored) Bobzien; (penalty missed) Cvetko; (penalty scored) Wernitznig; (penalty scored) Binder; (penalty scored) Jaritz; (penalty scored) Szerencsi; (penalty scored) Mahrer; (penalty scored) Straudi; (penalty scored) Dehl; (penalty missed) Robatsch

31 January 2025 Quarter-final	Wolfsberg	3–1	Schwarz-Weiß Bregenz	Wolfsberg
20:30 CET	Gattermayer 23'; Nwaiwu 29'; Zukić 50'	Report	Fetahu 37'	Stadium: Lavanttal-Arena; Attendance: 1,421; Referee: Christian-Petru Ciochirca

2 April 2025 Semi-final	LASK	1–1 (a.e.t.) (2–4 p)	Wolfsberg	Linz
18:15 CET	Entrup 5' (Flecker) (yellow card) 104' (yellow-red card) 105'	Report	Nwaiwu (yellow card) 5' (goal) 83' (Omić); Jašić (yellow card) 43'; Zukić (yellow card) 43'; Baumgartner (yellow card) 73'; Ballo (yellow card) 113'	Stadium: Raiffeisen Arena; Attendance: 12,900; Referee: Markus Hameter
	Penalties
	Jovičić (penalty scored); Ziereis (penalty missed); Daněk (penalty scored); Adeniran (penalty missed)		(penalty scored) Omić; (penalty scored) Schöpf; (penalty scored) Kojzek; (penalty scored) Ballo

1 May 2025 Final	Wolfsberg	1–0	TSV Hartberg	Klagenfurt am Wörthersee
17:00 CET	Gattermayer 77'	Report		Stadium: Wörthersee Stadion; Attendance: 20,500; Referee: Walter Altmann
