= 2024–25 Austrian Cup =

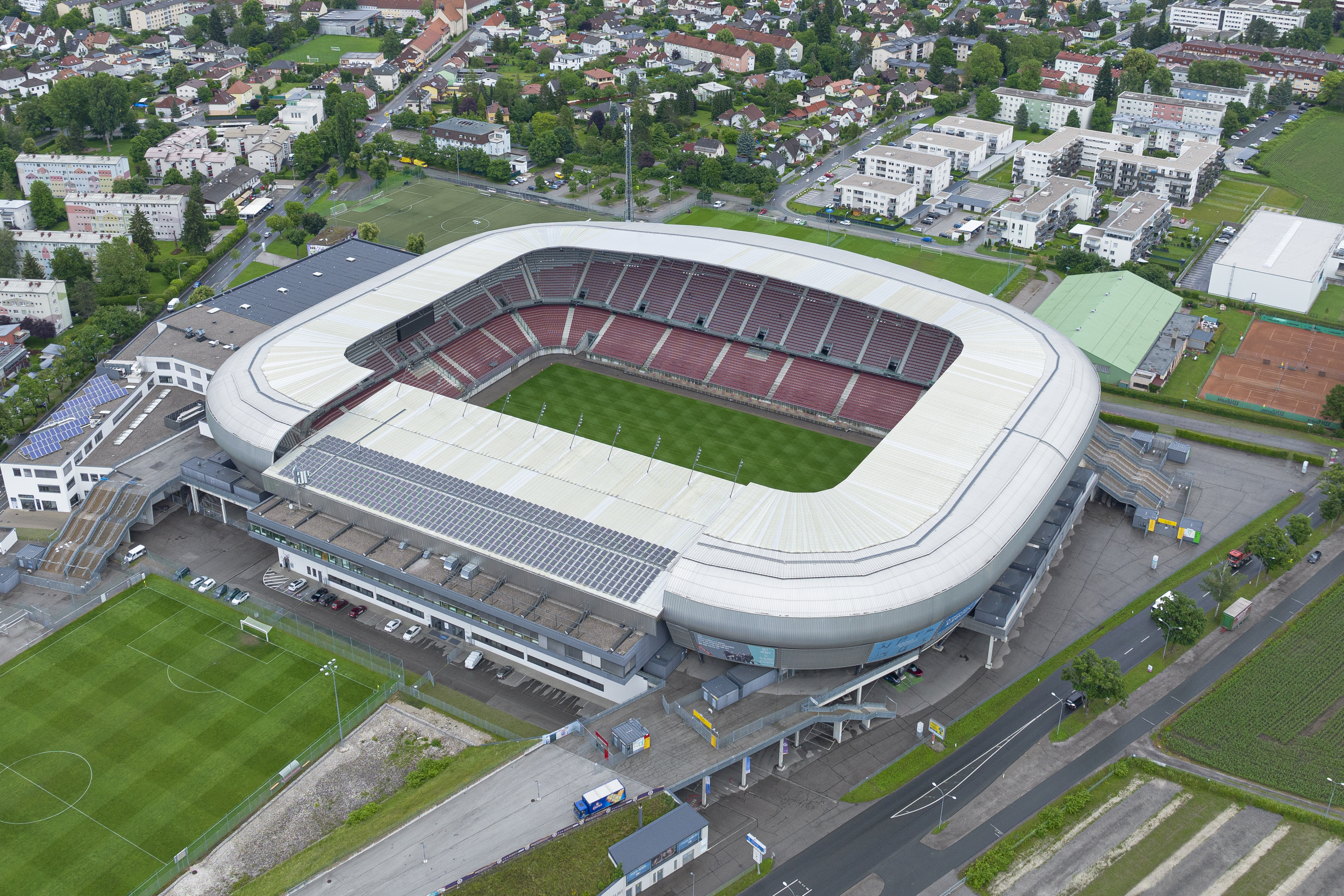
- Wörthersee Stadion hosted the final

Tournament details
- Country: Austria
- Teams: 64

Final positions
- Champions: Wolfsberg
- Runners-up: TSV Hartberg
- All statistics correct as of 1 May 2025.

The 2024–25 Austrian Cup was the 94th edition of the national cup in Austrian football. The winners qualified for the 2025–26 Europa League play-off round. Sturm Graz were the two-time defending champions, having defeated Rapid Wien in the 2023 and 2024 finals, but they were eliminated by Austria Wien in the quarter-finals. Match times up to 27 October 2024 and from 30 March 2025 are CEST (UTC+2). Times on interim ("winter") days are CET (UTC+1).

== Round dates ==
The schedule of the competition is as follows.

Round	Match date
Round 1	26–28 July 2024
Round 2	27–29 August 2024
Round 3	29–31 October 2024
Quarter-finals	31 January – 2 February 2025
Semi-finals	1–3 April 2025
Final	1 May 2025 at Wörthersee Stadion, Klagenfurt

== First round ==
Thirty-two first round matches was played between 26 July and 28 July 2024. The draw was held on Sunday, June 16 with the former ÖFB women's team manager and LASK coach Dominik Thalhammer acted as the "draw fairy".

Number of teams per tier still in competition
Bundesliga	2. Liga	Regionalliga	Landesliga	Total
12 / 12	14 / 14	27 / 27	11 / 11	64 / 64

26 July 2024	FC Mohren Dornbirn 1913 (III)	0–6	FC Red Bull Salzburg (I)	Dornbirn
18ː00 CEST (UTC+2)	Mbanga (yellow card) 85'; Brzaj (yellow card) 90+2'	Report	Konaté 29', 32'; Daghim 35'; Kjærgaard 38'; Lucas 63'; Diambou 83'	Stadium: Stadion Birkenwiese; Attendance: 1,500; Referee: Stjepan Bosnjak

26 July 2024	ASKÖ Köttmannsdorf (IV)	0–2	SV Horn (II)	Köttmannsdorf
18ː00 CEST (UTC+2)		Report	Barlov 41'; Abdijanovic 66'	Stadium: Sportplatz; Attendance: 450; Referee: Julian Schnur

26 July 2024	Union Gurten (III)	0–3	LASK (I)	Ried im Innkreis
18:00 CEST (UTC+2)	Horner (yellow card) 33'; Wirth (yellow card) 55'; Schott (yellow card) 72'	Report	Berisha 32'; Bello 43'; Bogarde (yellow card) 47'; Smolčić (yellow card) 55'; Usor 84'	Stadium: Klaus-Roitinger-Stadion; Attendance: 3,500; Referee: Stefan Ebner

26 July 2024	ATUS Fliesen Koller Velden (IV)	2–2 (a.e.t.) (3–4 p)	Grazer AK (I)	Villach
18:00 CEST (UTC+2)	Modritz 6'; Winter 55'; Putsche (yellow card) 56'; Zurga (yellow card) 59'; Kröpfl (yellow card) 84'; Kuster (yellow card) 98'	Report	Rosenberger 67'; Filipović (yellow card) 71'; Frieser 79'	Stadium: Stadion Villach/Lind; Attendance: 1,500; Referee: Florian Hunter
	Penalties
	Kröpfl (penalty scored); Modritz (penalty missed); Putsche (penalty missed); Sadnik (penalty scored); Zurga (penalty scored); Kopeinig (penalty missed)		(penalty missed) Cheukoua; (penalty scored) Cipot; (penalty scored) Vučić; (penalty scored) Rosenberger; (penalty missed) Gantschnig; (penalty scored) Frieser

26 July 2024	Wiener Viktoria (III)	2–1 (a.e.t.)	Leoben (III)	Vienna
18:00 CEST (UTC+2)	Rotter 71' (pen.), 118' (pen.) (yellow card) 116'	Report	Hirschhofer 57'; Eskinja (yellow card) 90+1'; Aydın (yellow card) 108'; Brkic (yellow card) 116'; Pichler (yellow card) 117'; Friesenbichler (yellow card) 120'	Stadium: Sportplatz Wiener Viktoria; Attendance: 300; Referee: Sebastian Gishamer

26 July 2024	SK Treibach (III)	1–6	Kapfenberger SV (II)	Althofen
18ː30 CEST (UTC+2)	Lamzari 80' (pen.)	Report	Hofleitner 2', 17' (pen.); Römling 25'; Eloshvili 41'; Turi 88'; Heleparth 90+2'	Stadium: Turnerwald Stadion; Attendance: 500; Referee: Christopher Jäger

26 July 2024	Bischofshofen Sportklub 1933 (III)	1–11	TSV Hartberg (I)	Bischofshofen
19ː00 CEST (UTC+2)	Kircher 63'	Report	Mijić 12', 30', 58', 65'; Omoregie 15'; Diarra 52'; Havel] 70'; Avdijaj 73'; Providence 79', 80'; Wilfinger 90+1' (pen.)	Stadium: Sportplatz; Attendance: 450; Referee: Achim Untergasser

26 July 2024	ASV Draßburg (IV)	0–7	Wolfsberger AC (I)	Draßburg
19ː00 CEST (UTC+2)		Report	Etzelsdorfer 5' (o.g.); Sabitzer 24'; Ballo 32'; Gattermayer 43'; Kojzek 69', 87'; Agyemang 85'	Stadium: Sportplatz; Attendance: 510; Referee: Gabriel Gmeiner

26 July 2024	FCM Traiskirchen (III)	1–4	SKU Amstetten (II)	Traiskirchen
19ː00 CEST (UTC+2)	Schimandl 63'	Report	Wanner 7'; Koppensteiner 81'; Mayer 88', 90+2'	Stadium: ARBÖ-Arena; Attendance: 250; Referee: Alexander Harkam

26 July 2024	SV Gloggnitz (III)	0–5	SK Austria Klagenfurt (I)	Gloggnitz
19ː00 CEST (UTC+2)		Report	Toshevski 20'; Binder 24'; Cvetko 30'; Bobzien 41', 71'	Stadium: Krammer-Arena; Attendance: 1,700; Referee: Safak Barmaksiz

26 July 2024	SV Wallern (III)	4–0	FC Kitzbühel (III)	Wallern
19ː00 CEST (UTC+2)	Affenzeller 40', 80'; Huspek 42'; Steinmayr 73'	Report		Stadium: Sportanlage; Attendance: 200; Referee: Marina Zechner

26 July 2024	SV Wals-Grünau (III)	1–2	SC Austria Lustenau (II)	Wals-Siezenheim
19ː00 CEST (UTC+2)	Pajic 90+4' (pen.)	Report	Baallal 40'; Cisse 89'	Stadium: Hans-Ludwig Stadion; Attendance: 750; Referee: Patrick Koscielnicki

26 July 2024	SC Weiz (III)	3–3 (a.e.t.) (7–8 p)	SV Lafnitz (II)	Weiz
19ː00 CEST (UTC+2)	Kiedl 47'; Fink 76'; Schmerleib 118'	Report	Knollmüller 42'; Mahmić 48'; Plavčić 105'	Stadium: Strobl Arena; Attendance: 0 Referee: Philip Gadler

26 July 2024	Deutschlandsberger SC (III)	5–0	SK Korneuburg (IV)	Deutschlandsberg
19ː30 CEST (UTC+2)	Hoić 33', 72'; Fuchshofer 44', 71', 76'	Report		Stadium: Sportplatz; Attendance: 700; Referee: Edis Skalic

26 July 2024	FC Marchfeld Donauauen (III)	1–3	First Vienna FC (II)	Mannsdorf
19ː30 CEST (UTC+2)	Mihailović 17'	Report	Ochs 47'; Boateng 54'; Luxbacher 67'	Stadium: Aulandstadion; Attendance: 600; Referee: Florian Leitner

26 July 2024	SV Oberwart (III)	0–2	SV Stripfing (II)	Oberwart
19ː30 CEST (UTC+2)		Report	Hausjell 19', 48'	Stadium: Informstadion; Attendance: 500; Referee: Julian Weinberger

27 July 2024	SV Austria Salzburg (III)	1–2	SVG Reichenau (III)	Salzburg
17ː00 CEST (UTC+2)	Zia 29'	Report	Kleinlercher 22'; Singer 86'	Stadium: Max Aicher Stadion; Attendance: 1,323; Referee: Matthias Gächter

27 July 2024	SR Donaufeld (III)	2–0	SCR Altach (I)	Vienna
17ː30 CEST (UTC+2)	Babić 14' van Zaanen 90+1' (pen.)	Report		Stadium: Sportplatz Donaufeld; Attendance: 800; Referee: Markus Hameter

27 July 2024	Union Dietach (IV)	0–2	FC Hertha Wels (III)	Dietach
17ː30 CEST (UTC+2)		Report	Birglehner 13'; Mišlov 67'	Stadium: DietachArena; Attendance: 700; Referee: Cagri Demir

27 July 2024	SC Schwaz (III)	0–2	Schwarz-Weiß Bregenz (II)	Schwaz
18ː00 CEST (UTC+2)		Report	Stefanon 55'; Monsberger 90+4'	Stadium: Silberstadt Arena; Attendance: 400; Referee: Samuel Sampl

27 July 2024	ASK Klagenfurt (VII)	0–14	Sportunion Mauer (III)	Klagenfurt
18ː00 CEST (UTC+2)		Report	Elbl 7', 49', 78'; Kurz 15', 37'; Necina 40', 76' (pen.); Sprinzer 45', 56'; Komornyik 51', 72'; Heiter 62'; Ruiss 84'; Hentschel 85'	Stadium: ASK Sportzentrum Fischl; Attendance: 170; Referee: Daniel Holzinger

27 July 2024	VfB Hohenems (III)	4–4 (a.e.t.) (2–4 p)	ASKÖ Oedt (III)	Hohenems
18ː00 CEST (UTC+2)	Yabantas 14', 90+2'; Ünal 44' (pen.); Kong 78'	Report	Vidackovic 29', 67'; Valdir 47'; Breškić 49'	Stadium: Herrenriedstadion; Attendance: 400; Referee: Philipp Mayer

27 July 2024	SV Wildon (III)	0–5	FC Blau-Weiß Linz (I)	Wildon
18ː00 CEST (UTC+2)		Report	Ronivaldo 26', 71'; Schmidt 79'; Goiginger 82'; Gölles 87'	Stadium: Stadion Wildon; Attendance: 1,000; Referee: Emil Ristoskov

27 July 2024	Kremser SC (III)	2–4 (a.e.t.)	SK Sturm Graz (I)	Krems an der Donau
18ː15 CEST (UTC+2)	Gökçek 13', 30' (pen.)	Report	Sarkaria 6'; Horvat 26'; Gorenc Stanković 113'; Biereth 120+2'	Stadium: Sepp-Doll-Stadion; Attendance: 6,200; Referee: Alain Sadikovski

27 July 2024	SV Donau (IV)	0–3	ASK Voitsberg (II)	Vienna
18ː30 CEST (UTC+2)		Report	Sezen 8' (o.g.); Kirnbauer 77'; Suppan 86'	Stadium: Sportplatz SV Donau; Attendance: 150; Referee: Davor Divkovic

27 July 2024	SV Leobendorf (III)	2–3	SKN St. Pölten (II)	Leobendorf
19ː00 CEST (UTC+2)	Bartholomay 41'; Hahn 75'	Report	Stendera 46'; Kabamba 50', 58'	Stadium: Sportplatz Leobendorf SV; Attendance: 1,000; Referee: Arnes Talic

27 July 2024	USV St. Anna (III)	1–5	FC Admira Wacker (II)	Sankt Anna am Aigen
19ː00 CEST (UTC+2)	Polak 51'	Report	Malicsek 12'; Fabiani 35' (o.g.); Brückler 58'; Mujanović 70'; Alar 87'	Stadium: Stahlbau Müller Arena; Attendance: 850; Referee: Harald Lechner

27 July 2024	ASV Siegendorf (III)	2–1	Floridsdorfer AC (II)	Siegendorf
19ː30 CEST (UTC+2)	Svoboda 41'; Grozurek 45'	Report	Kuliš 70'	Stadium: PAC Sportpark; Attendance: 300; Referee: Manuel Baumann

28 July 2024	SC Röfix Röthis (III)	0–11	SV Ried (II)	Röthis
10ː30 CEST (UTC+2)		Report	Bumberger 2'; Wohlmuth 7'; Grosse 19', 32' (pen.), 47'; Sané 36', 44', 57', 64'; Beganović 73' (pen.); Sollbauer 78'	Stadium: Sportplatz an der Ratz; Attendance: 600; Referee: Olivia Tschon

28 July 2024	FC Pinzgau Saalfelden (III)	0–6	FK Austria Wien (I)	Saalfelden
16ː00 CEST (UTC+2)		Report	Fitz 16'; Gruber 20'; Pazourek 36'; Plavotic 40'; Prelec 59'; Husković 77'	Stadium: 1508 Saalfelden Arena; Attendance: 1,000; Referee: Markus Greinecker

28 July 2024	SC Imst (III)	0–3	WSG Tirol (I)	Imst
16:30 CEST (UTC+2)	Rossetti (yellow card) 40'; Schneebauer (yellow card) 56'; Krismer (yellow card) 63'	Report	Blume 23'; Anselm 65', 72'; Gugganig (yellow card) 78'	Stadium: Velly Arena; Attendance: 2,284; Referee: Stefan Macanovic

28 July 2024	SC Neusiedl am See 1919 (III)	0–2	Rapid Wien (I)	Neusiedl am See
18:30 CEST (UTC+2)	Wodicka (yellow card) 73'	Report	Beljo 39'; Sangaré (yellow card) 55'; Kaygın 73'	Stadium: Sportzentrum Neusiedl; Attendance: 3,000; Referee: Jacob Semler

== Second round ==
Sixteen first round matches will be played between 27 and 29 August 2024. The draw was held by former Neusiedl player Friedrich Csarmann.

Number of teams per tier still in competition
Bundesliga	2. Liga	Regionalliga	Landesliga	Total
11 / 12	12 / 14	9 / 27	0 / 11	32 / 64

27 August 2024	Deutschlandsberger SC (III)	2–4	WSG Tirol (I)	Deutschlandsberg
19:00 CEST (UTC+2)	Syla 5', 56'	Report	Anselm 20'; Müller 56'; Okungbowa 68'; Diarra 90+3'	Stadium: Koralmstadion Deutschlandsberg; Attendance: 1,300; Referee: Manuel Baumann

27 August 2024	ASV Siegendorf (III)	0–5	SK Austria Klagenfurt (I)	Siegendorf
19:00 CEST (UTC+2)		Report	Binder 14'; Wernitznig 18'; Bobzien 27'; Toshevski 79', 90'	Stadium: PAC Sportpark; Attendance: 724; Referee: Josef Spurny

27 August 2024	FC Admira Wacker (II)	1–3	SC Austria Lustenau (II)	Maria Enzersdorf
19:00 CEST (UTC+2)	Holzmann 53'	Report	Cisse 11', 74'; Malicsek 65' (o.g.)	Stadium: Datenpol Arena; Attendance: 878; Referee: Samuel Sampl

27 August 2024	First Vienna FC (II)	0–3	SV Stripfing (II)	Vienna
19:00 CEST (UTC+2)		Report	Andrade 17'; Kante 44'; Pecirep 84'	Stadium: Naturarena Hohe Warte; Attendance: 1,007; Referee: Arnes Talic

27 August 2024	SKN St. Pölten (II)	0–2	Schwarz-Weiß Bregenz (II)	St. Pölten
19:00 CEST (UTC+2)		Report	Vucenovic 36'; Prirsch 56'	Stadium: NV Arena; Attendance: 1,100; Referee: Florian Leitner

27 August 2024	SV Horn (II)	3–1	SKU Amstetten (II)	Horn
19:00 CEST (UTC+2)	Barlov 42'; Fischerauer 63'; Abdijanovic 90+2'	Report	Herrmann 68'	Stadium: Sparkasse Horn Arena; Attendance: 620; Referee: Isa Simsek

27 August 2024	SV Lafnitz (II)	0–6	TSV Hartberg (I)	Lafnitz
19:00 CEST (UTC+2)		Report	Avdijaj 3', 74', 88'; Mijic 30', 44'; Hoffmann 87'	Stadium: Fußballarena Lafnitz; Attendance: 1,300; Referee: Daniel Pfister

28 August 2024	SVG Reichenau (III)	0–9	Grazer AK (I)	Innsbruck
17:30 CEST (UTC+2)		Report	Cheukoua 4', 22', 58'; Vučić 16'; Schiestl 51'; Schriebl 67'; Lichtenberger 69'; Frieser 75', 88'	Stadium: Kunstrasen Reichenau; Attendance: 643; Referee: Stefan Macanovic

28 August 2024	SV Ried (II)	1–3	Sturm Graz (I)	Ried im Innkreis
18:00 CEST (UTC+2)	Bumberger 45+1'	Report	Horvat 23'; Jatta 32', 44'	Stadium: Innviertel Arena; Attendance: 5,832; Referee: Sebastian Gishamer

28 August 2024	FC Hertha Wels (III)	0–1	Blau-Weiß Linz (I)	Wels
18:30 CEST (UTC+2)		Report	Noß 14'	Stadium: Mauth Stadion Wels; Attendance: 2,550; Referee: Stjepan Bosnjak

28 August 2024	ASKÖ Oedt (III)	2–3	Austria Wien (I)	Traun
19:00 CEST (UTC+2)	Vidakovic 2'; Alukwu 81'	Report	Prelec 9'; Husković 11'; Fischer 83' (pen.)	Stadium: Transdanubia Sportanlage Oedt; Attendance: 1,200; Referee: Philip Gadler

28 August 2024	Kapfenberger SV (II)	0–2	ASK Voitsberg (II)	Kapfenberg
19:00 CEST (UTC+2)		Report	Milla 40'; Seidl 76'	Stadium: Stadion Kapfenberg; Attendance: 800; Referee: Gabriel Gmeiner

28 August 2024	SV Wallern (III)	0–2	Wolfsberg (I)	Wallern
19:30 CEST (UTC+2)		Report	Zukić 47'; Ballo 72'	Stadium: Sportanlage Wallern; Attendance: 600; Referee: Patrick Koscielnicki

24 September 2024	Sportunion Mauer (III)	0–4	LASK (I)	Vienna
18:00 CEST (UTC+2)		Report	Žulj 19', 36', 52'; Taoui 68'	Stadium: Sportplatz Union Mauer; Attendance: 1,300; Referee: Sampl Samuel

25 September 2024	SR Donaufeld (III)	1–3	Rapid Wien (I)	Vienna
18:00 CEST (UTC+2)	Holzer 30'	Report	Beljo 48', 50'; Sangare 54'	Stadium: Sportplatz Donaufeld; Attendance: 4,500; Referee: Untergasser Hachim

25 September 2024	Wiener Viktoria (III)	0–4	Red Bull Salzburg (I)	Vienna
18:00 CEST (UTC+2)		Report	Ratkov 1'; E. Baidoo 3'; Sinner 60'; Konaté 68'	Stadium: Sportplatz Wiener Viktoria; Attendance: 2,500; Referee: Greinecker Markus

== Round of 16 ==
Eight Round of 16 matches were played between 29 and 31 October 2024.

Number of teams per tier still in competition
Bundesliga	2. Liga	Regionalliga	Landesliga	Total
11 / 12	5 / 14	0 / 27	0 / 11	16 / 64

29 October 2024	SC Austria Lustenau (II)	0–3	TSV Hartberg (I)	Bregenz
19:00 CET	Voisine (yellow card) 30'; William Rodrigues (yellow card) 54'	Report	Avdijaj 48' 86' (Demir); Prokop 55' (Mijić)	Stadium: ImmoAgentur Stadion; Attendance: 1,077; Referee: Arnes Talic

30 October 2024	SV Horn (II)	0–1	Austria Wien (I)	Horn
18:15 CET	Ismailcebioglu (yellow card) 53'; Hinterleitner (yellow card) 85'	Report	Ranftl (yellow card) 10' (goal) 36' (Ranftl); Barry (yellow card) 27'; Raguž (yellow card) 27'; Fischer (yellow card) 47'; Maybach (yellow card) 50'	Stadium: Sparkasse Horn Arena; Attendance: 3,425; Referee: Markus Hameter

30 October 2024	ASK Voitsberg (II)	1–2	LASK (I)	Voitsberg
18:15 CET	Krienzer 34' (Halwachs); Sidar (yellow card) 76'; Pungaršek (yellow card) 90+2'	Report	Bogarde (yellow card) 30'; Žulj 42' (Berisha); Ziereis 47'; Horvath (yellow card) 80'; Stojković (yellow card) 90'	Stadium: Münzer Bioindustrie Sportpark Voitsberg; Attendance: 2,350; Referee: Josef Spurny

30 October 2024	SV Stripfing (II)	2–1	Rapid Wien (I)	Vienna
18:15 CET	Schmelzer (yellow card) 13'; Furtlehner (yellow card) 42'; Pecirep 79'; Radonjić 85'; Abazovic (yellow card) 87'; Gabryel (yellow card) 90'	Report	Hofmann 39' (Böckle) (yellow card) 83'; Vincze (yellow card) 65'	Stadium: Hohe Warte Nature Arena; Attendance: 2,545; Referee: Alexander Harkam

30 October 2024	Schwarz-Weiß Bregenz (II)	2–1	Grazer AK (I)	Bregenz
19:00 CET	Renan 7' (yellow card) 90+1'; Krnjic (yellow card) 31'; Tiefenbach (yellow card) 32'; Vucenovic 79' (Renan) (yellow card) 80'; Tartarotti (yellow card) 90+3'; Gschossmann (yellow card) 90+5'	Report	Frieser (yellow card) 54'; Maderner 75' (Lichtenberger); Gantschnig (yellow card) 76'; Cipot (yellow card) 85'	Stadium: ImmoAgentur Stadion; Attendance: 1,200; Referee: Stjepan Bosnjak

30 October 2024	Wolfsberg (I)	2–2 (a.e.t.) (9–8 p)	SK Austria Klagenfurt (I)	Wolfsberg
20:30 CET	Gütlbauer (yellow card) 14'; Baumgartner (yellow card) 14'; Agyemang (yellow card) 50'; Sabitzer (yellow card) 66' (goal) 70' (Agyemang); Ballo 95' (Karamoko); Omić (yellow card) 118'	Report	Toshevski 15' (pen); Dehl (yellow card) 63'; Robatsch (yellow card) 90+1' (goal) 111' (Mahrer)	Stadium: Lavanttal-Arena; Attendance: 2,651; Referee: Safak Barmaksiz
	Penalties
	Jašić (penalty missed); Omić (penalty scored); Baumgartner (penalty scored); Altunashvili (penalty scored); Piesinger (penalty scored); Karamoko (penalty scored); Matić (penalty scored); Ballo (penalty scored); Ullmann (penalty scored); Wimmer (penalty scored)		(penalty scored) Bobzien; (penalty missed) Cvetko; (penalty scored) Wernitznig; (penalty scored) Binder; (penalty scored) Jaritz; (penalty scored) Szerencsi; (penalty scored) Mahrer; (penalty scored) Straudi; (penalty scored) Dehl; (penalty missed) Robatsch

30 October 2024	Red Bull Salzburg (I)	3–0	WSG Tirol (I)	Wals-Siezenheim
20:30 CET	Bajčetić (yellow card) 10'; Konaté 35' (pen); Gadou (yellow card) 43'; Terzić 53'; Daghim 83' (Konaté)	Report	Taferner (yellow card) 1'; Blume (yellow card) 31'; Vötter (yellow card) 81'; Lawrence (yellow card) 90+2'	Stadium: Red Bull Arena; Attendance: 2,437; Referee: Harald Lechner

30 October 2024	Sturm Graz (I)	2–1	Blau-Weiß Linz (I)	Graz
20:30 CET	Zvonarek 24' (Yardımcı); Aiwu (yellow card) 32'; Yardımcı 33' (Karić)	Report	Anderson (yellow card) 41'; Mitrović 58' (Dobras); Dobras (yellow card) 84'	Stadium: Merkur Arena; Attendance: 10,680; Referee: Christopher Jäger

== Quarter-finals ==
Four Quarter-final matches will be played on 31 January 2025.

Number of teams per tier still in competition
Bundesliga	2. Liga	Regionalliga	Landesliga	Total
6 / 12	2 / 14	0 / 27	0 / 11	8 / 64

31 January 2025	SV Stripfing (II)	0–2 (a.e.t.)	TSV Hartberg (I)	Vienna
18:00 CET		Report	Mijić 102'; Havel 104'	Stadium: Generali Arena; Attendance: 547; Referee: Josef Spurny

31 January 2025	Wolfsberg (I)	3–1	Schwarz-Weiß Bregenz (II)	Wolfsberg
20:30 CET	Gattermayer 23'; Nwaiwu 29'; Zukić 50'	Report	Fetahu 37'	Stadium: Lavanttal-Arena; Attendance: 1,421; Referee: Christian-Petru Ciochirca

1 February 2025	Sturm Graz (I)	0–2	Austria Wien (I)	Graz
18:15 CET		Report	Ranftl 9'; Raguž 89'	Stadium: Merkur Arena; Attendance: 15,400; Referee: Christopher Jäger

2 February 2025	LASK (I)	2–1 (a.e.t.)	Red Bull Salzburg (I)	Linz
18:15 CET	Jovičić 71'; Adeniran 109'	Report	Gloukh 33'	Stadium: Raiffeisen Arena; Attendance: 12,310; Referee: Harald Lechner

== Semi-finals ==
The draw for semi-final matches was take on 7 February. The matches will played from 1 to 3 April 2025.

Number of teams per tier still in competition
Bundesliga	2. Liga	Regionalliga	Landesliga	Total
4 / 12	0 / 14	0 / 27	0 / 11	4 / 64

2 April 2025	LASK (I)	1–1 (a.e.t.) (2–4 p)	Wolfsberg (I)	Linz
18:15 CET	Entrup 5' (Flecker) (yellow card) 104' (yellow-red card) 105'	Report	Nwaiwu (yellow card) 5' (goal) 83' (Omić); Jašić (yellow card) 43'; Zukić (yellow card) 43'; Baumgartner (yellow card) 73'; Ballo (yellow card) 113'	Stadium: Raiffeisen Arena; Attendance: 12,900; Referee: Markus Hameter
	Penalties
	Jovičić (penalty scored); Ziereis (penalty missed); Daněk (penalty scored); Adeniran (penalty missed)		(penalty scored) Omić; (penalty scored) Schöpf; (penalty scored) Kojzek; (penalty scored) Ballo

2 April 2025	Austria Wien (I)	0–1	TSV Hartberg (I)	Vienna
20:30 CET	Malone (yellow card) 75'; Barry (yellow card) 79'; Ranftl (yellow card) 88'; Fitz (yellow card) 90+5'; Dragović (red card) 90+6'	Report	Kainz (yellow card) 16'; Demir (yellow card) 47'; Avdijaj 54' (Mijić); Diarra (yellow card) 90'	Stadium: Generali Arena; Attendance: 14,237; Referee: Sebastian Gishamer

== Final ==
The final was played on 1 May 2025. This was the first appearance in an Austrian Cup final for both teams, ensuring a first-time winner of the cup this year.

Number of teams per tier still in competition
Bundesliga	2. Liga	Regionalliga	Landesliga	Total
2 / 12	0 / 14	0 / 27	0 / 11	2 / 64

1 May 2025
17:00 CET

Wolfsberg (I)	1–0	TSV Hartberg (I)
Gattermayer 77'	Report

Wörthersee Stadion, Klagenfurt am Wörthersee
Attendance: 20,500
Referee: Walter Altmann

== See also ==
- 2024–25 Austrian Football Bundesliga
- 2024–25 Austrian Football Second League
