= 2023–24 Wolfsberger AC season =

Wolfsberger AC
2023–24 season
- Manager: Manfred Schmid
- Stadium: Lavanttal-Arena
- Austrian Football Bundesliga: 1th (Relegation round); 8th (Regular season)
- Austrian Cup: Third round
- Top goalscorer: League: Thierno Ballo (12); All: Thierno Ballo (13)

The 2023–24 Wolfsberger AC season is the club's 93rd season in existence and its 12th consecutive season in the top flight of Austrian football. In addition to the domestic league, Wolfsberger AC will participate in this season's edition of the Austrian Cup. The season covers the period from 1 July 2023 to 30 June 2024.

== Players ==
=== First-team squad ===
As of 7 July 2023

Note: Flags indicate national team as defined under FIFA eligibility rules; some limited exceptions apply. Players may hold more than one non-FIFA nationality.

No.	Pos.	Nation	Player
1	GK	GER	Hendrik Bonmann
3	DF	AUT	Jonathan Scherzer
4	DF	CAN	Scott Kennedy
5	DF	GER	Kevin Bukusu
6	MF	NGR	Samson Tijani (on loan from Red Bull Salzburg)
7	MF	AUT	Konstantin Kerschbaumer
8	DF	AUT	Simon Piesinger
9	FW	AUT	Bernhard Zimmermann (on loan from Rapid Wien)
10	FW	AUT	Thomas Sabitzer
11	MF	AUT	Thierno Ballo
12	FW	CIV	Mohammed Bamba
13	DF	AUT	Tobias Gruber
14	MF	AUT	Pascal Müller

No.	Pos.	Nation	Player
16	MF	AUT	Mario Leitgeb
17	DF	AUT	Nikolas Veratschnig
18	FW	AUT	Thorsten Röcher
19	MF	GEO	Sandro Altunashvili
20	MF	GHA	Augustine Boakye
21	GK	AUT	David Skubl
22	DF	AUT	Dominik Baumgartner
23	FW	AUT	Florian Rieder
26	DF	AUT	Lukas Ibertsberger (on loan from Red Bull Salzburg)
27	DF	AUT	Michael Novak
32	GK	AUT	Lukas Gütlbauer
44	MF	AUT	Ervin Omić
97	MF	BIH	Adis Jašić

=== Out on loan ===
Note: Flags indicate national team as defined under FIFA eligibility rules; some limited exceptions apply. Players may hold more than one non-FIFA nationality.

No.	Pos.	Nation	Player
—	DF	AUT	Raphael Schifferl (at Unterhaching)

== Transfers ==
=== In ===
Pos.	Player	Transferred from	Fee	Date	Source

=== Out ===
Pos.	Player	Transferred to	Fee	Date	Source

== Pre-season and friendlies ==
Win Draw Loss Fixtures

11 July 2023 Friendly	Wolfsberger AC	1–0	Debrecen
15:30 CEST (UTC+2)

14 July 2023 Friendly	Wolfsberger AC	1–2	Al Hilal
18:00 CEST (UTC+2)

== Competitions ==
=== Overview ===
Competition	First match	Last match	Starting round	Final position	Record							
Competition	First match	Last match	Starting round	Final position	Pld	W	D	L	GF	GA	GD	Win %
Austrian Football Bundesliga	July 2023	May 2024	Matchday 1	7th	33	12	10	11	42	41	+1	36.36
Austrian Cup	22 July 2023	31 October 2023	First round	Third round	3	2	1	0	7	2	+5	66.67
Total					36	14	11	11	49	43	+6	38.89

Last updated: 21 May 2024
Source: Soccerway

=== Austrian Football Bundesliga ===
==== League table ====
Pos	Team	Pld	W	D	L	GF	GA	GD	Pts	Qualification
6	Rapid Wien	22	8	9	5	38	21	+17	33 (Note: Head to head points: Rapid 4, Austria Wien 1.)	Qualification for the Championship round
7	Austria Wien	22	9	6	7	25	22	+3	33	Qualification for the Relegation round
8	Wolfsberger AC	22	8	6	8	29	32	−3	30	Qualification for the Relegation round
9	SCR Altach	22	4	7	11	17	30	−13	19	Qualification for the Relegation round
10	Blau-Weiß Linz	22	4	7	11	22	38	−16	19	Qualification for the Relegation round

Source: Austrian Football Bundesliga
Rules for classification: 1) Points; 2) Head-to-head record; 3) Goal difference; 4) Goals scored; 5) Matches won; 6) Away matches won; 7) Away goals scored.
Notes:

Pos	Team	Pld	W	D	L	GF	GA	GD	Pts	Qualification	STU	RBS	LASK	RWI	HAR	AKL
1	Sturm Graz (C)	32	19	10	3	56	23	+33	44	Qualification for the Champions League league stage	—	0–1	1–0	1–0	1–1	2–0
2	Red Bull Salzburg	32	20	7	5	74	29	+45	42	Qualification for the Champions League third qualifying round (Note: Since the Europa League winners, Atalanta qualified for the Champions League via league position, Red Bull Salzburg were promoted from the Champions League second qualifying round to the third qualifying round as one of the two teams with the highest coefficient in the second qualifying round.)	2–2	—	7–1	1–1	5–1	4–2
3	LASK	32	14	10	8	43	33	+10	34	Qualification for the Europa League play-off round (Note: The 2023–24 Austrian Cup winners qualified for the Europa League play-off round. Since the cup winners (Sturm Graz) qualified based on league position, the Europa League spot was passed to the third-placed team.)	2–2	3–1	—	5–0	1–3	1–0
4	Rapid Wien	32	11	12	9	47	35	+12	28	Qualification for the Europa League second qualifying round	1–3	2–0	0–0	—	0–3	1–1
5	Hartberg	32	12	9	11	49	52	−3	28	Qualification for the Conference League play-offs	1–3	1–5	1–2	0–3	—	3–2
6	Austria Klagenfurt	32	9	12	11	40	50	−10	22		0–4	4–3	0–2	0–1	2–2	—

Source: Austrian Football Bundesliga
Legend: Blue = home team win; Yellow = draw; Red = away team win.
Rules for classification: 1) Points; 2) Points with (possible) half points subtracted due to rounding; 3) Head-to-head points; 4) Head-to-head goal difference; 5) Head-to-head goals scored; 6) Goal difference; 7) Goals scored; 8) Matches won; 9) Away matches won; 10) Away goals scored.
(C) Champions
Notes:

Pos	Team	Pld	W	D	L	GF	GA	GD	Pts	Qualification	WOL	AWI	BWL	ALT	WAT	LUS
1	Wolfsberger AC	32	12	10	10	41	39	+2	31	Qualification for the Conference League play-offs	—	0–1	0–2	0–0	3–1	1–1
2	Austria Wien (O)	32	12	10	10	35	34	+1	29	Qualification for the Conference League play-offs	0–4	—	0–0	2–2	3–0	1–1
3	Blau-Weiß Linz	32	7	11	14	33	48	−15	22		0–0	1–2	—	2–1	3–2	0–0
4	Rheindorf Altach	32	6	13	13	27	40	−13	21		0–1	1–1	2–2	—	0–0	2–2
5	WSG Tirol	32	7	5	20	29	55	−26	19		1–1	1–0	2–1	0–1	—	0–0
6	Austria Lustenau (R)	32	4	9	19	22	58	−36	16	Relegation to Austrian Football Second League	1–2	2–0	1–0	0–1	1–2	—

Legend: Blue = home team win; Yellow = draw; Red = away team win.
Rules for classification: 1) Points; 2) Points with (possible) half points subtracted due to rounding; 3) Head-to-head points; 4) Head-to-head goal difference; 5) Head-to-head goals scored; 6) Head-to-head away goals scored; 7) Goal difference; 8) Goals scored; 9) Matches won; 10) Away matches won; 11) Away goals scored.
(O) Play-off winners; (R) Relegated

==== Results summary ====
Overall								Home						Away					
Pld	W	D	L	GF	GA	GD	Pts	W	D	L	GF	GA	GD	W	D	L	GF	GA	GD
0	0	0	0	0	0	0	0	0	0	0	0	0	0	0	0	0	0	0	0

Last updated: November 2023.

==== Results by round ====
Round	1
Ground	
Result	
Position	

Updated to match(es) played on November 2023. Source:
A = Away; H = Home; W = Win; D = Draw; L = Loss

==== Matches ====
The league fixtures were unveiled on 27 June 2023.

August 2023 1	v

=== Austrian Cup ===
The draw for the season's first round took place on 25 June.

21 July 2023 First round	FC Kufstein	v	Wolfsberger AC
