= Wallern =

Wallern may refer to the following places:

- Wallern im Burgenland, in Burgenland, Austria
- Wallern an der Trattnach, in Upper Austria, Austria
- the German name for Volary, Czech Republic
- SV Wallern, Austrian football club
