= 2022–23 Wolfsberger AC season =

Wolfsberger AC
2022–23 season
- Chairman: Dietmar Riegler
- Manager: Robin Dutt
- Stadium: Lavanttal-Arena
- Austrian Football Bundesliga: 1st (relegation round); 9th (regular season)
- Austrian Cup: Quarter-finals
- UEFA Europa Conference League: Play-off round
Home colours

The 2022–23 season is the 93rd in the history of Wolfsberger AC and their 11th consecutive season in the top flight. The club will participate in Austrian Football Bundesliga, the Austrian Cup, and the UEFA Europa Conference League.

== Players ==
As of 24 January 2023

Note: Flags indicate national team as defined under FIFA eligibility rules; some limited exceptions apply. Players may hold more than one non-FIFA nationality.

No.	Pos.	Nation	Player
1	GK	GER	Hendrik Bonmann
3	DF	AUT	Jonathan Scherzer
4	DF	AUT	David Gugganig
5	DF	GER	Tim Oermann (on loan from VfL Bochum)
6	MF	AUT	Nikolas Veratschnig
7	MF	AUT	Konstantin Kerschbaumer
8	DF	AUT	Simon Piesinger
11	FW	ISR	Tai Baribo
12	DF	ITA	Matteo Anzolin
14	MF	AUT	Pascal Müller
16	MF	AUT	Mario Leitgeb
17	MF	AUT	Ervin Omić
18	FW	AUT	Thorsten Röcher

No.	Pos.	Nation	Player
19	DF	ANG	Kevin Bukusu
20	FW	GHA	Augustine Boakye
21	GK	AUT	David Skubl
22	DF	AUT	Dominik Baumgartner
24	DF	AUT	Raphael Schifferl
25	DF	AUT	Fabian Tauchhammer
27	DF	AUT	Michael Novak
30	MF	AUT	Matthäus Taferner
32	GK	AUT	Lukas Gütlbauer
70	MF	AUT	Thierno Ballo
77	FW	GER	Maurice Malone (on loan from Augsburg)
97	MF	BIH	Adis Jašić

=== Out on loan ===
Note: Flags indicate national team as defined under FIFA eligibility rules; some limited exceptions apply. Players may hold more than one non-FIFA nationality.

No.	Pos.	Nation	Player
—	MF	AUT	Lukas Schöfl (at Floridsdorfer AC)
—	FW	GRE	Nikos Vergos (at Lamia)

No.	Pos.	Nation	Player
—	FW	CRO	Dario Vizinger (at Jahn Regensburg)

== Pre-season and friendlies ==
Win Draw Loss Fixtures

2 July 2022 Friendly	Wolfsberger AC	0–1	Holstein Kiel	Maria Alm
16:00 CEST (UTC+2)		Report		Stadium: Sportplatz Maria Alm

6 July 2022 Friendly	Grazer AK	2–1	Wolfsberger AC	Lebring
18:30 CEST (UTC+2)		Report		Stadium: sanSirro Stadion Lebring

9 July 2022 Friendly	Wolfsberger AC	1–0	Sparta Prague	Wolfsberg
15:30 CEST (UTC+2)		Report		Stadium: Lavanttal-Arena

14 July 2022 Friendly	Wolfsberger AC	2–1	Debrecen	Unterpremstätten
15:30 CEST (UTC+2)		Report		Stadium: Sportpark Premstätten

27 July 2022 Friendly	Wolfsberger AC	0–5	Milan	Klagenfurt am Wörthersee
19:00 CEST (UTC+2)	Veratschnig (yellow card) 8'		Leão 39'; Rebić 41'; Messias 57'; Adli 60'; Gabbia 65'	Stadium: Wörthersee Stadion; Referee: Josef Spurny (Austria)

== Competitions ==
=== Overall record ===
Competition	First match	Last match	Starting round	Final position	Record							
Competition	First match	Last match	Starting round	Final position	Pld	W	D	L	GF	GA	GD	Win %
Austrian Football Bundesliga	23 July 2022		Matchday 1		16	5	2	9	29	34	−5	31.25
Austrian Cup	16 July 2022		First round		3	3	0	0	12	3	+9	100.00
UEFA Europa Conference League	3 August 2022	25 August 2022	Third qualifying round	Play-off round	4	2	1	1	5	4	+1	50.00
Total					23	10	3	10	46	41	+5	43.48

Last updated: 13 November 2022
Source: Soccerway

=== Austrian Football Bundesliga ===
==== League table ====
Pos	Team	Pld	W	D	L	GF	GA	GD	Pts	Qualification
7	WSG Tirol	22	8	4	10	32	37	−5	28	Qualification for the Relegation round
8	Austria Lustenau	22	7	6	9	29	37	−8	27	Qualification for the Relegation round
9	Wolfsberger AC	22	6	3	13	35	41	−6	21	Qualification for the Relegation round
10	Hartberg	22	5	3	14	22	42	−20	18	Qualification for the Relegation round
11	SV Ried	22	4	6	12	16	32	−16	18	Qualification for the Relegation round

Source: Austrian Football Bundesliga
Rules for classification: 1) Points; 2) Head-to-head record; 3) Goal difference; 4) Goals scored; 5) Matches won; 6) Away matches won; 7) Away goals scored.

Pos	Team	Pld	W	D	L	GF	GA	GD	Pts	Qualification	RBS	STU	LIN	RWI	AWI	KLA
1	Red Bull Salzburg (C)	32	23	8	1	67	22	+45	49	Qualification for the Champions League group stage	—	2–1	0–0	2–1	3–3	3–2
2	Sturm Graz	32	20	6	6	57	29	+28	42	Qualification for the Champions League third qualifying round	0–2	—	2–0	3–1	3–2	4–1
3	LASK	32	14	12	6	54	38	+16	35	Qualification for the Europa League play-off round	0–1	2–1	—	3–1	3–1	4–0
4	Rapid Wien	32	12	6	14	50	47	+3	25	Qualification for the Europa Conference League third qualifying round	1–1	3–2	1–1	—	3–3	3–1
5	Austria Wien (O)	32	11	10	11	55	52	+3	24	Qualification for the Europa Conference League play-offs	1–1	1–2	2–2	3–1	—	1–2
6	Austria Klagenfurt	32	11	5	16	45	63	−18	23		0–3	0–2	1–1	2–1	1–1	—

Source: Austrian Football Bundesliga
Legend: Blue = home team win; Yellow = draw; Red = away team win.
Rules for classification: 1) Points; 2) Points with (possible) half points subtracted due to rounding; 3) Head-to-head points; 4) Head-to-head goal difference; 5) Head-to-head goals scored; 6) Head-to-head away goals scored; 7) Goal difference; 8) Goals scored; 9) Matches won; 10) Away matches won; 11) Away goals scored.
(C) Champions; (O) Play-off winners

Pos	Team	Pld	W	D	L	GF	GA	GD	Pts	Qualification	WOL	LUS	WAT	HAR	ALT	RIE
1	Wolfsberger AC	32	12	6	14	51	51	0	31	Qualification for the Europa Conference League play-offs	—	2–2	2–0	2–2	0–0	1–0
2	Austria Lustenau	32	11	10	11	50	54	−4	29	Qualification for the Europa Conference League play-offs	1–3	—	2–4	5–1	1–0	2–2
3	WSG Tirol	32	10	8	14	44	53	−9	24		4–0	0–2	—	1–1	1–1	1–1
4	Hartberg	32	9	6	17	39	56	−17	24		0–2	0–1	5–0	—	2–2	2–0
5	Rheindorf Altach	32	6	10	16	29	53	−24	19		0–2	1–1	1–0	0–1	—	1–1
6	Ried (R)	32	4	11	17	27	50	−23	14	Relegation to Austrian Football Second League	1–2	4–4	1–1	1–3	0–1	—

Legend: Blue = home team win; Yellow = draw; Red = away team win.
Rules for classification: 1) Points; 2) Points with (possible) half points subtracted due to rounding; 3) Head-to-head points; 4) Head-to-head goal difference; 5) Head-to-head goals scored; 6) Head-to-head away goals scored; 7) Goal difference; 8) Goals scored; 9) Matches won; 10) Away matches won; 11) Away goals scored.
(R) Relegated

==== Results summary ====
Overall								Home						Away					
Pld	W	D	L	GF	GA	GD	Pts	W	D	L	GF	GA	GD	W	D	L	GF	GA	GD
4	0	2	2	5	10	−5	2	0	1	1	2	6	−4	0	1	1	3	4	−1

Last updated: 14 August 2022.
Source: Austrian Football Bundesliga

==== Results by round ====
Round	1	2	3	4	5
Ground	H	A	H	A	H
Result	D	D	L	L	
Position	7	9	10	11	

Updated to match(es) played on 14 August 2022. Source: Austrian Football Bundesliga
A = Away; H = Home; W = Win; D = Draw; L = Loss

==== Matches ====
The league fixtures were announced on 22 June 2022.

23 July 2022 1	Wolfsberger AC	1–1	Sturm Graz	Wolfsberg
19:30 CEST (UTC+2)	Kerschbaumer 26'	Report	Sarkaria 43'	Stadium: Lavanttal-Arena; Referee: Christopher Jäger

30 July 2022 2	Rheindorf Altach	2–2	Wolfsberger AC	Altach
17:00 CEST (UTC+2)	Nuhiu 12'; Jäger 63'	Report	Jasic 53'; Baribo 88'	Stadium: Stadion Schnabelholz; Referee: Markus Hameter

6 August 2022 3	Wolfsberger AC	1–5	LASK	Wolfsberg
17:00 CEST (UTC+2)	Novak 61'	Report	Ljubičić 1', 21', 37', 58'; Goiginger 8'	Stadium: Lavanttal-Arena; Referee: Rene Eisner

14 August 2022 4	Red Bull Salzburg	2–1	Wolfsberger AC	Wals-Siezenheim
17:00 CEST (UTC+2)	Pavlović 20'; Šeško 41'	Report	Vizinger 90+3'	Stadium: Red Bull Arena; Referee: Alexander Harkam

21 August 2022 5	Wolfsberger AC	v	Austria Wien	Wolfsberg
17:00 CEST (UTC+2)				Stadium: Lavanttal-Arena

=== Austrian Cup ===
17 July 2022 First round	SV Raika Kuchl	1–4	Wolfsberger AC	Kuchl
17:00 CEST (UTC+2)	Lürzer 33'; Strobl (yellow card) 38'; Klimitsch (yellow card) 55'	Report	Kerschbaumer 11'; Baribo 15', 48'; Veratschnig 66'	Stadium: Sportplatz Kuchl; Attendance: 700; Referee: Walter Altmann

=== UEFA Europa Conference League ===
==== Third qualifying round ====
The draw for the third qualifying round was held on 18 July 2022.

3 August 2022 First leg	Wolfsberger AC (Austria)	0–0	(Malta) Gżira United	Klagenfurt
19:30 CEST (UTC+2)		Report		Stadium: Wörthersee Stadion; Attendance: 2,114; Referee: Urs Schnyder (Switzerland)
Note: Wolfsberger AC are playing their home matches at the Wörthersee Stadion, in Klagenfurt, instead of their regular venue, the Lavanttal-Arena, in Wolfsberg, which did not meet UEFA requirements.

9 August 2022 Second leg	Gżira United (Malta)	0–4 (0–4 agg.)	(Austria) Wolfsberger AC	Ta' Qali, Malta
18:00 CEST (UTC+2)		Report	Baribo 12'; Baumgartner 33'; Röcher 59' (pen.); Boakye 84'	Stadium: Centenary Stadium; Attendance: 786; Referee: Nick Walsh (Scotland)

==== Play-off round ====
The draw for the play-off round was held on 2 August 2022.

18 August 2022 First leg	Molde (Norway)	0–1	(Austria) Wolfsberger AC	Molde, Norway
19:00 CEST (UTC+2)		Report	Baribo 22'	Stadium: Aker Stadion; Attendance: 4,761; Referee: Anastasios Papapetrou (Greece)

25 August 2022 Second leg	Wolfsberger AC (Austria)	0–4 (1–4 agg.)	(Norway) Molde	Klagenfurt
19:00 CEST (UTC+2)		Report	Breivik 6'; Mannsverk 34'; Brynhildsen 72', 90+3'	Stadium: Wörthersee Stadion; Attendance: 3,105; Referee: Rob Harvey (Republic of Ireland)
Note: Wolfsberger AC are playing their home matches at the Wörthersee Stadion, in Klagenfurt, instead of their regular venue, the Lavanttal-Arena, in Wolfsberg, which did not meet UEFA requirements.
