= Nikolas Polster =

Austrian footballer (born 2002)

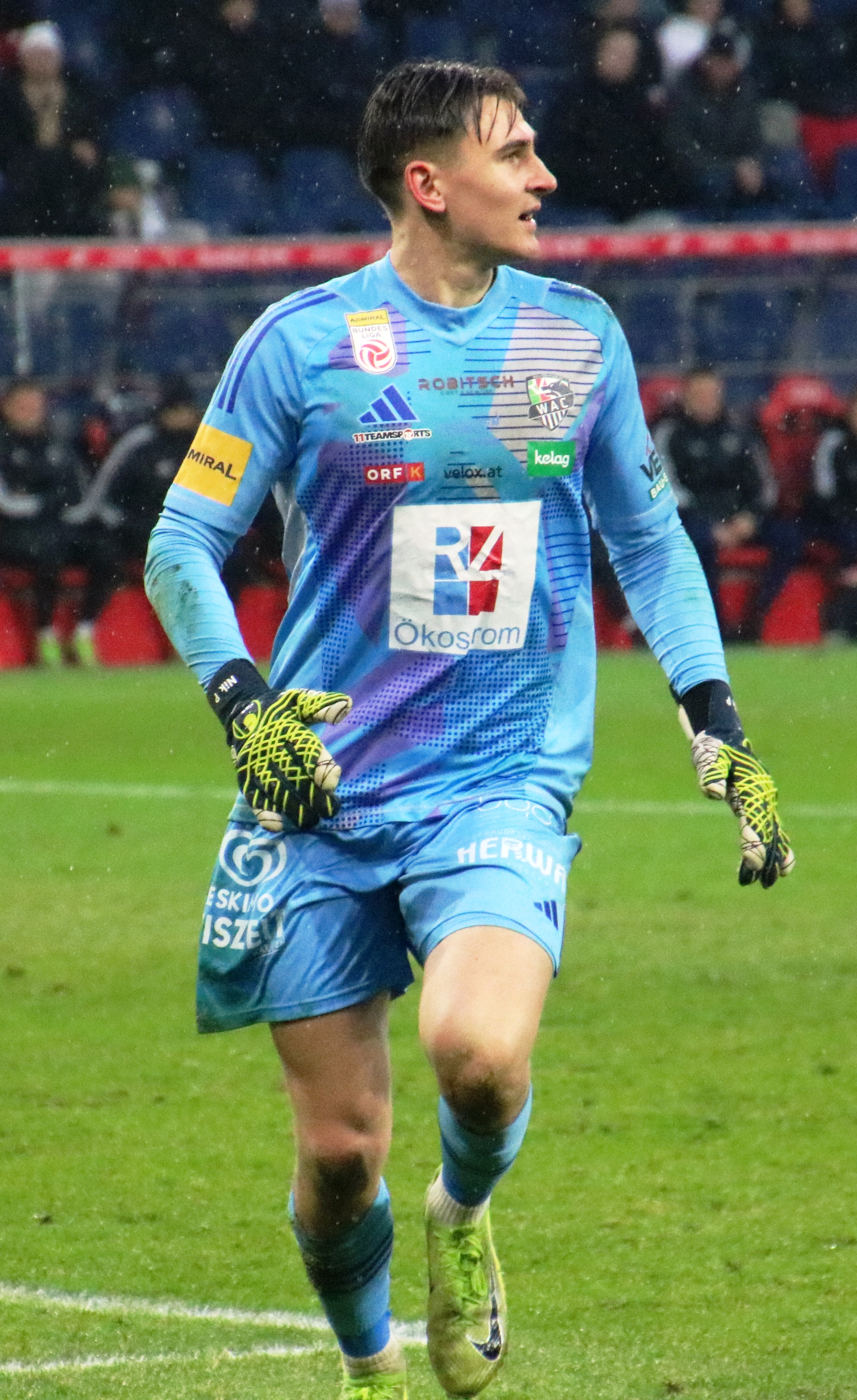
- Polster in 2025

Personal information
- Date of birth: 7 July 2002 (age 24)
- Place of birth: Vienna, Austria
- Height: 1.89 m (6 ft 2 in)
- Position: Goalkeeper

Team information
- Current team: NEC
- Number: 12

Youth career
- 2009–2018: Rapid Wien

Senior career*
Years	Team	Apps	(Gls)
2018–2020	Rapid Wien II	1	(0)
2020–2024	LASK	0	(0)
2020–2023	→ Juniors OÖ (loan)	34	(0)
2023	→ Vorwärts Steyr (loan)	14	(0)
2023–2024	→ Horn (loan)	26	(0)
2024–2026	Wolfsberger AC	61	(0)
2026–	NEC	3	(0)

International career^{‡}
2017	Austria U15	4	(0)
2017–2018	Austria U16	4	(0)
2018–2019	Austria U17	7	(0)
2019–2020	Austria U18	4	(0)
2022–2024	Austria U21	17	(0)
- * Club domestic league appearances and goals as of 20 September 2026 ‡ National team caps and goals as of 15:26, 7 July 2025 (UTC)

Nikolas Polster (born 7 July 2002) is an Austrian professional footballer who plays as a goalkeeper for Eredivisie club NEC.

== Career ==
Polster is a youth product of Rapid Wien since 2009, and signed his first contract with the club on 20 January 2018. He debuted with their reserves in the Austrian Regionalliga in 2018. On 2 June 2020, he transferred to LASK on a contract until 2023. He shortly after joined Juniors OÖ on loan in the Austrian 2. Liga for the 2020–21 season, and again for the 2021–22 season. On 17 January 2023, he went on loan with Vorwärts Steyr for the second half of the 2022–23 season. On 16 May 2023, he extended his contract with LASK until 2026. On 18 July 2023, he joined Horn on loan for the 2023–24 season.

On 10 July 2023, Polster transferred to Wolfsberger AC in the Austrian Football Bundesliga on a contract until 2027. He was the starting goalkeeper as they won their first ever trophy, the 2024–25 Austrian Cup.

On 12 August 2026, Polster signed a four-season contract with NEC in the Dutch top-tier Eredivisie, in the middle of their Champions League qualifying campaign. Two backup NEC goalkeepers, Jasper Cillessen and Rijk Janse, left in the summer, as Gonzalo Crettaz remained the club's first choice between the posts.

== International career ==
Polster is a youth international for Austria, having played from the Austria U15s to the Austria U21s. He made the Austria U17s for the 2019 UEFA European Under-17 Championship. He was called up to the senior Austria national team for a set of 2024–25 UEFA Nations League promotion/relegation play-offs matches in June 2025.

== Personal life ==
Outside of football, Nikolas Polster was a talented skier who won a few regional championships. His goalkeeper role-model is Jan Oblak.

== Career statistics ==
As of match played 20 September 2026

Appearances and goals by club, season and competition
Club	Season	League			National cup		Europe		Other		Total	
Club	Season	Division	Apps	Goals	Apps	Goals	App	Goals	Apps	Goals	Apps	Goals
Rapid Wien II	2018–19	Austrian Regionalliga East	1	0	—		—		—		1	0
LASK	2020–21	Austrian Bundesliga	0	0	0	0	0	0	—		0	0
Juniors OÖ (loan)	2020–21	2. Liga	13	0	—		—		—		13	0
Juniors OÖ (loan)	2021–22	2. Liga	12	0	—		—		—		12	0
Juniors OÖ (loan)	2022–23	Austrian Regionalliga Central	9	0	—		—		—		9	0
Juniors OÖ (loan)	Total		34	0	—		—		—		34	0
Vorwärts Steyr (loan)	2022–23	2. Liga	14	0	—		—		—		14	0
Horn (loan)	2023–24	2. Liga	26	0	—		—		—		26	0
Wolfsberger AC	2024–25	Austrian Bundesliga	30	0	4	0	—		—		34	0
Wolfsberger AC	2025–26	Austrian Bundesliga	29	0	1	0	3 (Note: Two appearances in UEFA Europa League, one appearance in UEFA Conference League)	0	1 (Note: Appearance in European play-offs)	0	34	0
Wolfsberger AC	2026–27	Austrian Bundesliga	2	0	—		—		—		2	0
Wolfsberger AC	Total		61	0	5	0	3	0	1	0	70	0
NEC	2026–27	Eredivisie	3	0	0	0	2 (Note: One appearance in UEFA Champions League, one appearance in UEFA Europa League)	0	—		5	0
Career total			139	0	5	0	5	0	1	0	150	0

== Honours ==
Wolfsberger AC

- Austrian Cup: 2024–25
