= Thierno Ballo =

Austrian footballer (born 2002)

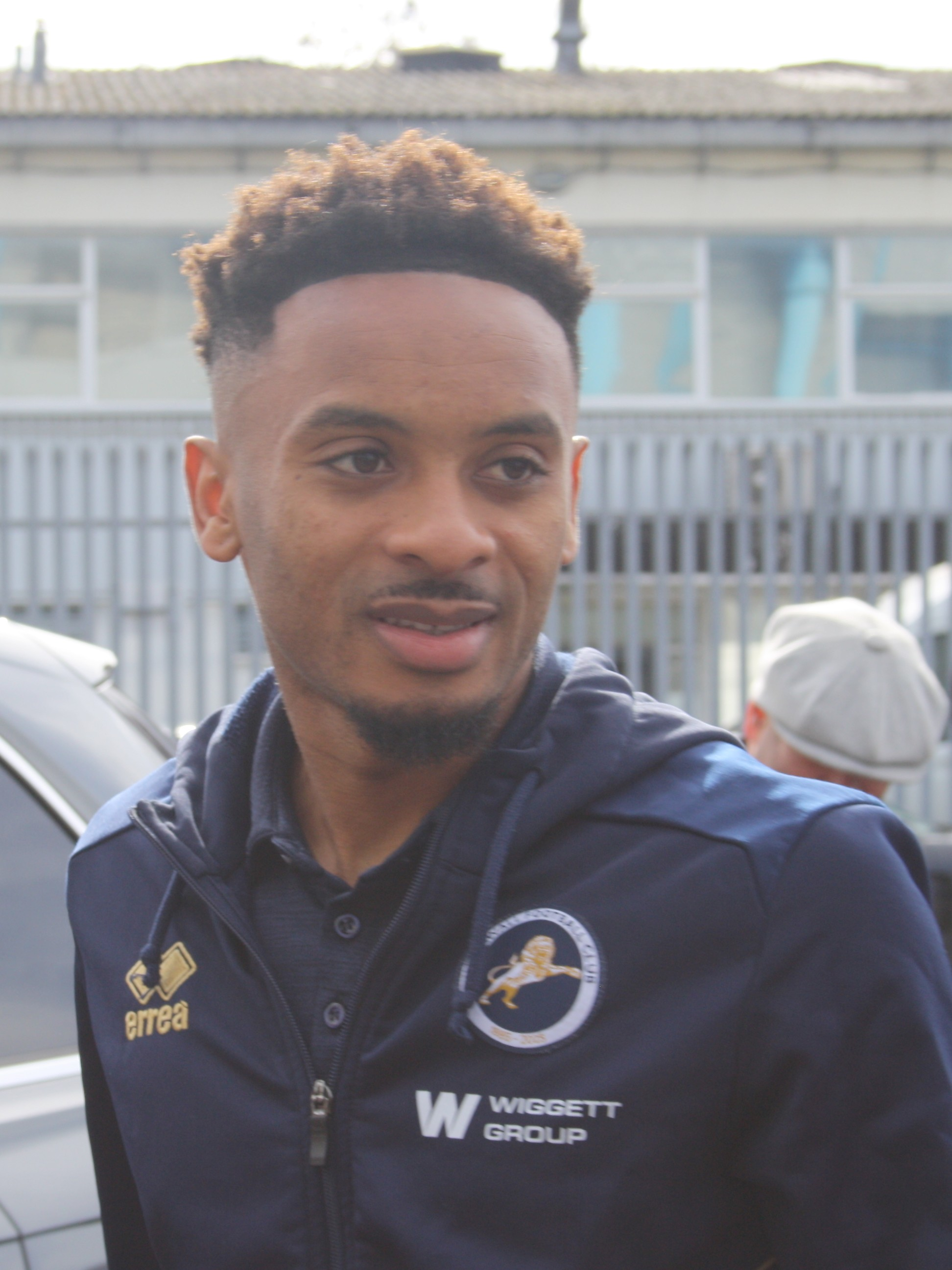
- Ballo in 2026.

Personal information
- Full name: Thierno Mamadou Lamarana Ballo
- Date of birth: 2 January 2002 (age 24)
- Place of birth: Abidjan, Ivory Coast
- Height: 1.72 m (5 ft 8 in)
- Positions: Attacking midfielder; winger

Team information
- Current team: Saint-Étienne
- Number: 8

Youth career
- –2012: SV Chemie Linz
- 2012: LASK
- 2013–2016: Bayer 04 Leverkusen
- 2016–2018: Viktoria Köln
- 2018–2021: Chelsea

Senior career*
| Years | Team | Apps | (Gls) |
| 2021–2022 | Chelsea | 0 | (0) |
| 2021–2022 | → Rapid Wien (loan) | 8 | (0) |
| 2022–2026 | Wolfsberger AC | 88 | (28) |
| 2025–2026 | → Millwall (loan) | 31 | (1) |
| 2026– | Saint-Étienne | 12 | (5) |

International career
| 2016 | Austria U15 | 2 | (1) |
| 2016–2017 | Austria U16 | 5 | (2) |
| 2016–2019 | Austria U17 | 25 | (6) |
| 2018 | Austria U18 | 1 | (0) |
| 2018–2019 | Austria U19 | 12 | (6) |
| 2021–2024 | Austria U21 | 20 | (7) |
| 2025 | Austria | 1 | (0) |
- * Club domestic league appearances and goals as of 13:34, 9 November 2026 (UTC)

Thierno Mamadou Lamarana Ballo (born 2 January 2002) is a professional footballer who plays as an attacking midfielder or winger for Ligue 2 club Saint-Étienne. Born in the Ivory Coast, he has represented the Austria national team.

== Career ==
=== Chelsea ===
Born in Ivory Coast, Ballo moved to Guinea at the age of three before leaving for Austria four years later. Ballo joined Chelsea in January 2018, following stints with SV Chemie Linz, LASK, Bayer 04 Leverkusen and eventually, Viktoria Köln. During his debut under-18 campaign with the Blues, Ballo finished as top goalscorer for that respective age group and subsequently made his quick progression into the under-23 side over the next two years. He signed his first professional contract with Chelsea in January 2019.

On 31 August 2021, Ballo returned to Austria to join Rapid Wien on loan for the 2021–22 campaign. Just under a month later, he made his debut for the club featuring as second-half substitute during their Austrian Cup 2–1 victory over Admira Wacker. After only featuring thirteen times in all competitions come January 2022, Ballo's loan was terminated and the forward subsequently returned to Chelsea.

=== Wolfsberg ===
On 12 July 2022, Wolfsberger AC announced the signing of Ballo on a free transfer, after his release from Chelsea. Ballo signed a two-year contract with an option for a further year. On 23 July, he played his first game for the club in a 1–1 draw against SK Sturm Graz. On 28 August 2023, Ballo scored his first goal in his professional career in a league game against WSG Tirol, helping his team to a 3–1 victory, which is Wolfsberger's first league win of the season.

==== Loan to Millwall ====
On 1 September 2025, Ballo joined EFL Championship club Millwall on loan until the end of the season.

=== Saint-Étienne ===
On 11 July 2026, Ballo moved to Saint-Étienne in French Ligue 2 with a four-season contract.

== Career statistics ==
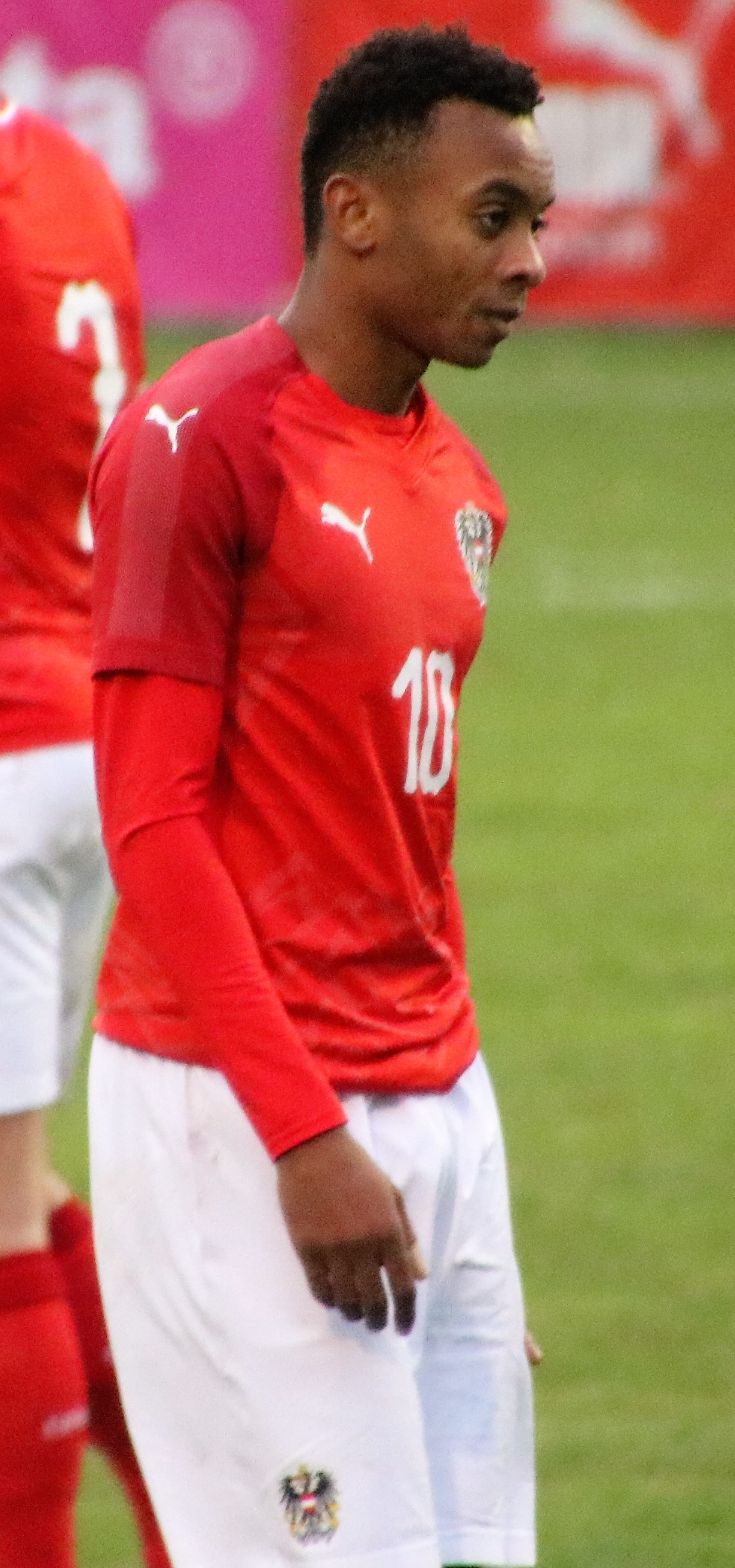
Ballo playing for Austria U19 in 2019.

=== Club ===
As of matches played 7 November 2026

Appearances and goals by club, season and competition
| Club | Season | League | | | National cup (Note: Includes Austrian Cup, FA Cup) | | League cup (Note: Includes EFL Cup) | | Continental | | Other | | Total | |
| Club | Season | Division | Apps | Goals | Apps | Goals | Apps | Goals | Apps | Goals | Apps | Goals | Apps | Goals |
|---|---|---|---|---|---|---|---|---|---|---|---|---|---|---|
| Chelsea U23 | 2019–20 | — | | | — | | — | | — | | 3 (Note: Appearances in the EFL Trophy) | 0 | 3 | 0 |
| Chelsea U23 | 2020–21 | — | | | — | | — | | — | | 2 | 0 | 2 | 0 |
| Chelsea U23 | Total | | — | | — | | — | | — | | 5 | 0 | 5 | 0 |
| Chelsea | 2021–22 | Premier League | 0 | 0 | 0 | 0 | 0 | 0 | 0 | 0 | 0 | 0 | 0 | 0 |
| Rapid Wien (loan) | 2021–22 | Austrian Bundesliga | 8 | 0 | 2 | 0 | — | | 3 (Note: Appearances in the UEFA Europa League) | 0 | — | | 13 | 0 |
| Wolfsberger AC | 2022–23 | Austrian Bundesliga | 27 | 6 | 4 | 1 | — | | 3 (Note: Appearances in the UEFA Europa Conference League) | 0 | 1 (Note: Appearance in the 2022–23 Austrian Football Bundesliga#Europa Conference League play-offs) | 0 | 35 | 7 |
| Wolfsberger AC | 2023–24 | Austrian Bundesliga | 27 | 12 | 2 | 1 | — | | — | | — | | 29 | 13 |
| Wolfsberger AC | 2024–25 | Austrian Bundesliga | 31 | 10 | 6 | 3 | — | | — | | — | | 37 | 13 |
| Wolfsberger AC | 2025–26 | Austrian Bundesliga | 3 | 0 | — | | — | | 4 (Note: Includes two appearances in UEFA Europa League and two appearances in UEFA Conference League) | 0 | — | | 7 | 0 |
| Wolfsberger AC | Total | | 88 | 28 | 12 | 5 | 0 | 0 | 7 | 0 | 1 | 0 | 108 | 33 |
| Millwall (loan) | 2025–26 | EFL Championship | 31 | 1 | 1 | 0 | 1 | 0 | — | | 2 (Note: Appearances in EFL Championship play-offs) | 0 | 35 | 1 |
| Saint-Étienne | 2026–27 | Ligue 2 | 12 | 5 | 0 | 0 | — | | — | | — | | 12 | 5 |
| Career total | | | 139 | 34 | 15 | 5 | 1 | 0 | 10 | 0 | 8 | 0 | 173 | 39 |

=== International ===
As of 10 June 2025

Appearances and goals by national team and year
| National team | Year | Apps | Goals |
|---|---|---|---|
| Austria | 2025 | 1 | 0 |
| Total | | 1 | 0 |

== Honours ==
Wolfsberger AC

- Austrian Cup: 2024–25
