= Nikolas Veratschnig =

Austrian footballer (born 2003)

- Veratschnig in 2026

Personal information
- Full name: Nikolas Konrad Veratschnig
- Date of birth: 24 January 2003 (age 23)
- Place of birth: Villach, Austria
- Height: 1.80 m (5 ft 11 in)
- Position: Midfielder

Team information
- Current team: Red Bull Salzburg
- Number: 18

Youth career
- 2009–2017: SV Feldkirchen
- 2017–2020: Wolfsberger AC

Senior career*
Years	Team	Apps	(Gls)
2020–2022	Wolfsberger II	18	(7)
2022–2024	Wolfsberger AC	64	(1)
2024–2026	Mainz 05	36	(0)
2026–	Red Bull Salzburg	7	(2)

International career^{‡}
2021	Austria U18	1	(0)
2021–2022	Austria U19	12	(1)
2022–2024	Austria U21	14	(4)
2026–	Austria	1	(0)
- * Club domestic league appearances and goals as of 27 September 2026 ‡ National team caps and goals as of 27 September 2026

Nikolas Konrad Veratschnig (born 24 January 2003) is an Austrian professional footballer who plays as a midfielder for Austrian Bundesliga club Red Bull Salzburg and the Austria national team.

== Club career ==
Veratschnig is a youth product of SV Feldkirchen, and moved to Wolfsberger AC's academy in 2017. He started training with Wolsfberger's reserves in 2020. On 2 December 2021, he signed his first professional contract with the club until June 2024. He made his professional debut with them in a 1–0 Austrian Bundesliga loss to Austria Wien on 22 February 2022.

On 25 June 2024, Veratschnig signed a four-year contract with Bundesliga club Mainz 05 in Germany.

On 9 June 2026, Veratschnig returned to Austria and signed a four-season deal with Red Bull Salzburg.

== International career ==
Veratschnig is a youth international for Austria, having represented the Austria U18s, U19s and U21s.

In September 2026, he was one of the players who were called up to the Austria national team by head coach Ralf Rangnick, for the 2026–27 UEFA Nations League B matches against Israel, Kosovo (twice) and Republic of Ireland on 24, 27 September, 1 and 4 October 2026.

== Career statistics ==
As of match played 20 September 2026

Appearances and goals by club, season and competition
Club	Season	League			National cup (Note: Includes Austrian Cup, DFB-Pokal)		Europe		Other		Total	
Club	Season	Division	Apps	Goals	Apps	Goals	Apps	Goals	Apps	Goals	Apps	Goals
Wolfsberger AC II	2020–21	Austrian Regionalliga	2	0	—		—		—		2	0
Wolfsberger AC II	2021–22	Austrian Regionalliga	12	2	—		—		—		12	2
Wolfsberger AC II	2022–23	Austrian Regionalliga	4	5	—		—		—		4	5
Wolfsberger AC II	Total		18	7	—		—		—		18	7
Wolfsberger AC	2021–22	Austrian Bundesliga	11	0	1	0	—		—		12	0
Wolfsberger AC	2022–23	Austrian Bundesliga	29	1	4	2	3 (Note: Appearances in UEFA Conference League)	0	1 (Note: Appearance in Austrian Bundesliga European play-offs)	0	37	3
Wolfsberger AC	2023–24	Austrian Bundesliga	24	0	2	0	—		1	0	27	0
Wolfsberger AC	Total		64	1	7	2	3	0	2	0	76	3
Mainz 05	2024–25	Bundesliga	15	0	1	0	—		—		16	0
Mainz 05	2025–26	Bundesliga	21	0	1	0	6	0	—		28	0
Mainz 05	Total		36	0	2	0	6	0	—		44	0
Red Bull Salzburg	2026–27	Austrian Bundesliga	7	1	2	1	5 (Note: Appearances in UEFA Europa League)	0	—		14	2
Career total			125	9	11	3	14	0	2	0	151	12

=== International ===
As of match played 27 September 2026

Appearances and goals by national team and year
National team	Year	Apps	Goals
Austria	2026	1	0
Total		1	0
