= Ervin Omić =

Austrian footballer (born 2003)

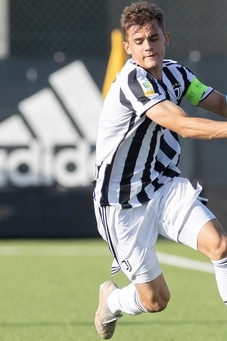
- Omić with Juventus U19 in 2021

Personal information
- Date of birth: 20 January 2003 (age 23)
- Place of birth: Ried im Innkreis, Austria
- Height: 1.85 m (6 ft 1 in)
- Positions: Defensive midfielder; centre-back

Team information
- Current team: CFR Cluj (on loan from Wisła Kraków)
- Number: 18

Youth career
- 2011–2017: SV Ried
- 2017–2019: Red Bull Salzburg
- 2019–2022: Juventus

Senior career*
| Years | Team | Apps | (Gls) |
| 2022 | Juventus U23 | 1 | (0) |
| 2022–2025 | Wolfsberger AC | 75 | (4) |
| 2022 | Wolfsberger AC II | 1 | (0) |
| 2025– | Wisła Kraków | 18 | (0) |
| 2026– | → CFR Cluj (loan) | 6 | (0) |

International career
| 2017–2018 | Austria U15 | 7 | (3) |
| 2018–2019 | Austria U16 | 8 | (3) |
| 2019 | Austria U17 | 5 | (2) |
| 2021 | Austria U18 | 1 | (0) |
| 2021–2022 | Austria U19 | 11 | (0) |
| 2022–2024 | Austria U21 | 13 | (0) |
- * Club domestic league appearances and goals as of 31 October 2026

Ervin Omić (born 20 January 2003) is an Austrian professional footballer who plays as a defensive midfielder or a centre-back for Liga I club CFR Cluj, on loan from Ekstraklasa club Wisła Kraków.

== Club career ==
=== Early career and Juventus ===
Omić started his career with SV Ried in 2011, staying at the club until January 2017, when he joined Red Bull Salzburg's academy, aged 13.

In 2019, Omić moved to Juventus, where he initially played for their Under-16 side. The following season, he was promoted to the Under-17s: upon his return from an injury, he was also given the captain's armband. He ended the 2019–20 season scoring six goals in nine appearances. For the 2020–2021 season, Omić was promoted to the Under-19 side, where he played 25 games without scoring goals. In the 2021–22 season, he made 33 appearances for the Italian side, and helped them reach the UEFA Youth League semifinals, their best-ever placement in the competition.

On 16 March 2022, Omić made his professional debut with Juventus U23 — the reserve team of the Italian club — , coming on as a substitute in the 87th minute of a 2–1 defeat against Lecco.

=== Wolfsberger AC ===
On 18 June 2022, Omić joined the Austrian club Wolfsberger AC on a permanent deal, signing a three-year contract. He played his first match for the club on 9 August 2022, featuring in the UEFA Europa Conference League play-off match against Gżira United, which ended in a 4–0 away win. He subsequently made his Bundesliga debut on 28 August, as he played the entire league match against WSG Tirol, which ended in a 1–3 win for his side.

=== Wisła Kraków ===
On 19 August 2025, Omić signed a two-year deal, with an option for a third year, with Polish I liga club Wisła Kraków.

==== Loan to CFR Cluj ====
On 7 September 2026, he extended his deal with Wisła until June 2028 and joined Romanian side CFR Cluj on loan for the rest of the season.

== International career ==
Omić is eligible to represent both Austria and Bosnia and Herzegovina at international level.

He has pledged his allegiance to the former country at youth international level, having played for all the youth national setups until the under-21 national team.

In June 2022, he was included in the Austrian Under-19 squad that took part in the UEFA European Under-19 Championship in Slovakia. Here, the team finished third in their group, before eventually losing to the hosts in the FIFA U-20 World Cup play-off.

== Style of play ==
Omić is a right-footed midfielder who can operate in several midfielder roles and even centre-back position. He is also a penalty and free-kick taker.

He cited Miralem Pjanić as his main role model.

== Career statistics ==
As of match played 31 October 2026

Appearances and goals by club, season and competition
| Club | Season | League | | | National cup (Note: Includes Austrian Cup, Polish Cup, Cupa României) | | Europe | | Other | | Total | |
| Club | Season | Division | Apps | Goals | Apps | Goals | Apps | Goals | Apps | Goals | Apps | Goals |
|---|---|---|---|---|---|---|---|---|---|---|---|---|
| Juventus U23 | 2021–22 | Serie C | 1 | 0 | 0 | 0 | — | | 0 | 0 | 1 | 0 |
| Wolfsberger AC | 2022–23 | Austrian Bundesliga | 26 | 0 | 3 | 0 | 2 (Note: Appearances in UEFA Europa Conference League) | 0 | 1 (Note: Appearances in Austrian Bundesliga European play-offs) | 0 | 32 | 0 |
| Wolfsberger AC | 2023–24 | Austrian Bundesliga | 25 | 2 | 2 | 0 | — | | 1 | 0 | 28 | 2 |
| Wolfsberger AC | 2024–25 | Austrian Bundesliga | 24 | 2 | 6 | 0 | — | | — | | 30 | 0 |
| Wolfsberger AC | Total | | 75 | 4 | 11 | 0 | 2 | 0 | 2 | 0 | 90 | 4 |
| Wolfsberger AC II | 2022–23 | Austrian Regionalliga | 1 | 0 | — | | — | | — | | 1 | 0 |
| Wisła Kraków | 2025–26 | I liga | 17 | 0 | 3 | 0 | — | | — | | 20 | 0 |
| Wisła Kraków | 2026–27 | Ekstraklasa | 1 | 0 | 0 | 0 | — | | — | | 1 | 0 |
| Wisła Kraków | Total | | 18 | 0 | 3 | 0 | — | | — | | 21 | 0 |
| CFR Cluj (loan) | 2026–27 | Liga I | 6 | 0 | 1 | 0 | — | | — | | 7 | 0 |
| Career total | | | 101 | 4 | 15 | 0 | 2 | 0 | 2 | 0 | 120 | 4 |

== Honours ==
Wolfsberger AC

- Austrian Cup: 2024–25

Wisła Kraków

- I liga: 2025–26
