= Darijo Pecirep =

Bosnian association footballer (born 1991)

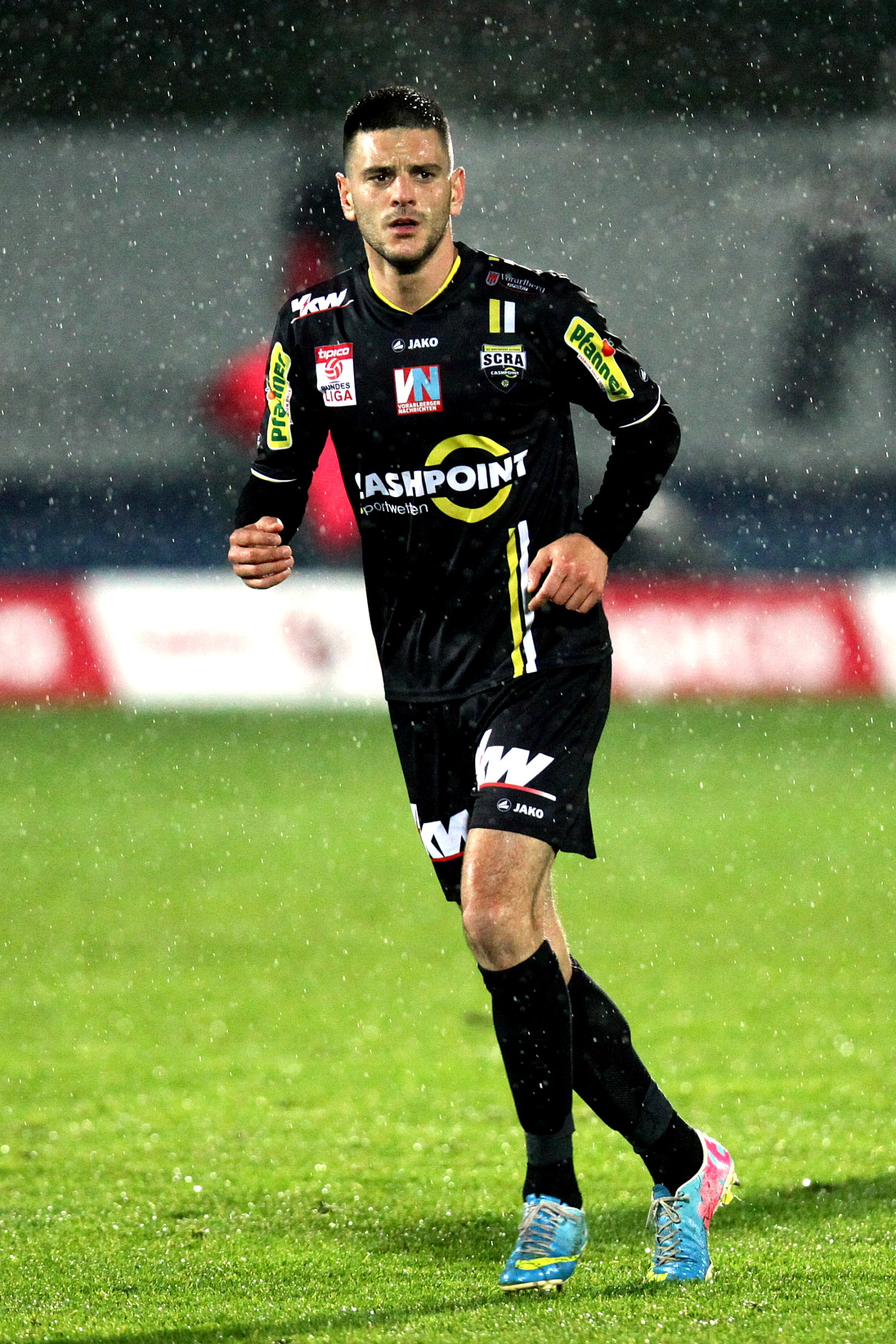
- Pecirep in 2014

Personal information
- Date of birth: 14 September 1991 (age 35)
- Place of birth: Kiseljak, Bosnia and Herzegovina
- Height: 1.88 m (6 ft 2 in)
- Position: Striker

Team information
- Current team: Wiener Sport-Club
- Number: 21

Senior career*
| Years | Team | Apps | (Gls) |
| 2008–2010 | Kiseljak | | |
| 2010 | LASK II | 9 | (2) |
| 2010–2012 | 1. Simmeringer SC | 51 | (20) |
| 2012–2013 | DAC 1904 | 8 | (1) |
| 2013–2014 | Wallern | 41 | (17) |
| 2014–2015 | Rheindorf Altach | 8 | (0) |
| 2015 | → Floridsdorfer AC (loan) | 11 | (1) |
| 2015–2016 | Wallern | 14 | (6) |
| 2016–2017 | Blau-Weiß Linz | 36 | (11) |
| 2017–2018 | Wiener Sport-Club | 23 | (17) |
| 2018–2019 | Ried | 25 | (11) |
| 2019–2022 | Austria Klagenfurt | 58 | (10) |
| 2022 | Šibenik | 0 | (0) |
| 2022–2025 | SV Stripfing | 86 | (43) |
| 2026– | Wiener Sport-Club | 12 | (5) |
- * Club domestic league appearances and goals as of 28 June 2026

Darijo Pecirep (born 14 August 1991) is a Bosnian professional footballer who plays as a striker for Wiener Sport-Club.

== Career ==
Pecirep began playing football with his hometown club Kiseljak in 2008, before moving to Austria in 2010 with the reserves of LASK. He moved to 1. Simmeringer SC in 2012, before moving to Slovakia with the club DAC 1904. He returned to Austria the following season with Wallern, and then played in the Austrian Football Bundesliga with Rheindorf Altach in 2014. He returned to Wallern in 2015, and then moved to cross-town rivals Blau-Weiß Linz in 2016. He had a short stint with semi-pro club Wiener Sport-Club, before moving to Ried in 2018. He transferred to Austria Klagenfurt in 2019, and helped them get promoted to the Austrian Football Bundesliga for the 2021–22 season. He transferred to the Croatian club HNK Šibenik in June 2022.

== Personal life ==
Pecirep was born in Kiseljak, Bosnia and Herzegovina and is of Croatian descent. He is married to wife Kristiana, and had his first child in October 2021.
