= Dominik Baumgartner =

Austrian footballer (born 1996)

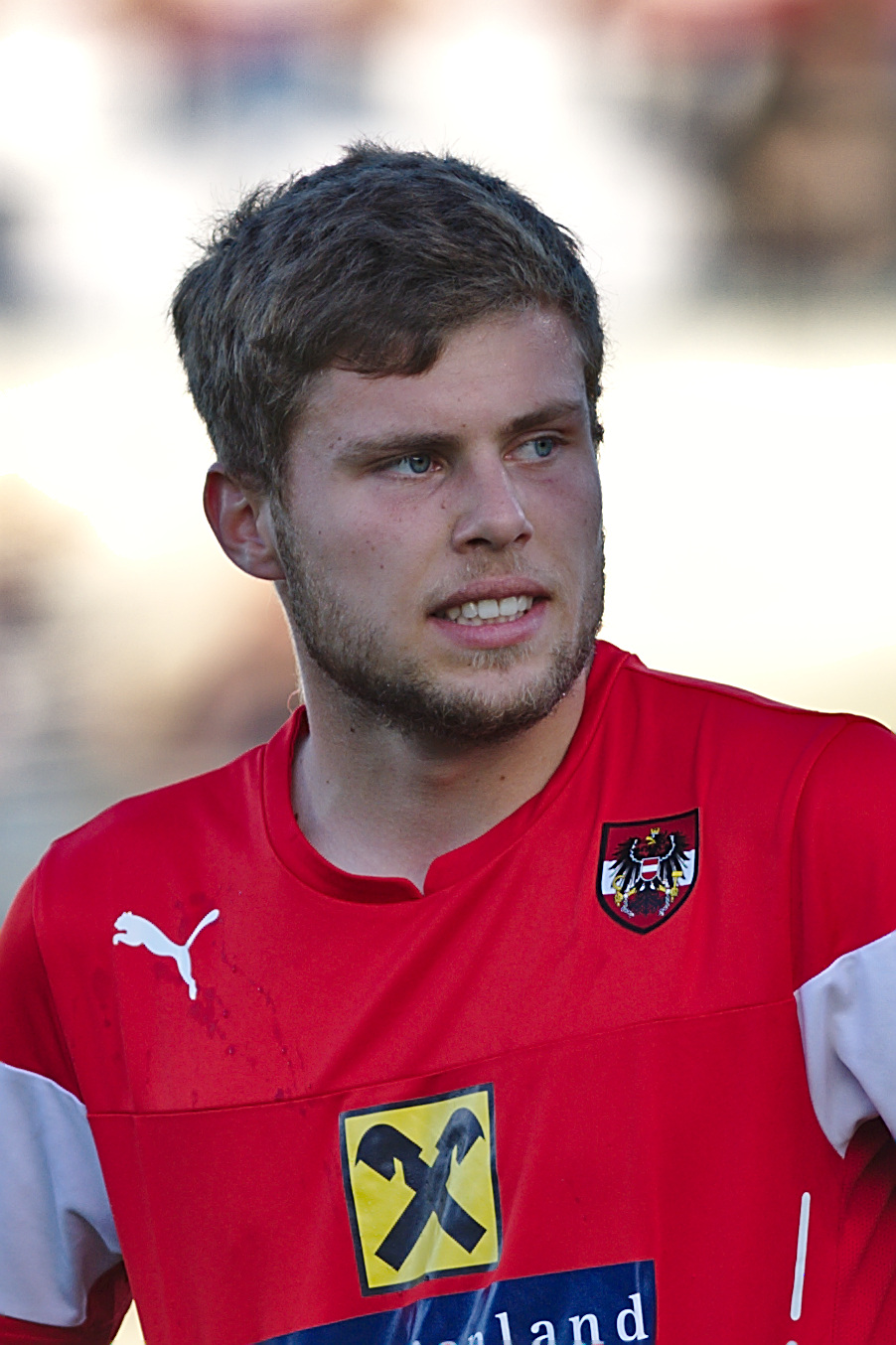
- Baumgartner in 2017

Personal information
- Full name: Dominik Baumgartner
- Date of birth: 20 July 1996 (age 30)
- Place of birth: Horn, Austria
- Height: 1.88 m (6 ft 2 in)
- Position: Centre-back

Team information
- Current team: Cracovia
- Number: 22

Youth career
- –2009: SV Horn
- 2009–2013: AKA St. Pölten
- 2013–2015: SV Horn

Senior career*
Years	Team	Apps	(Gls)
2013–2015	SV Horn	22	(1)
2015–2016	SV Grödig	7	(0)
2016–2019	Wacker Innsbruck	75	(5)
2016	→ Wacker Innsbruck II	2	(1)
2019–2020	VfL Bochum	11	(1)
2019–2020	→ Wolfsberger AC (loan)	12	(0)
2020–2026	Wolfsberger AC	157	(9)
2026–	Cracovia	0	(0)

International career
2011	Austria U16	1	(0)
2012–2013	Austria U17	23	(1)
2013–2015	Austria U19	6	(1)
2016–2019	Austria U21	17	(0)
- * Club domestic league appearances and goals as of 10 June 2026

Dominik Baumgartner (born 20 July 1996) is an Austrian professional footballer who plays as a centre-back for Ekstraklasa club Cracovia.

== Personal life ==
Baumgartner's younger brother, Christoph, is also a professional footballer, currently playing for Bundesliga club RB Leipzig and the Austria national team.

== Career statistics ==
As of match played 19 May 2026

Appearances and goals by club, season and competition
Club	Season	League			National cup (Note: Includes Austrian Cup, DFB-Pokal)		Europe		Other		Total	
Club	Season	Division	Apps	Goals	Apps	Goals	Apps	Goals	Apps	Goals	Apps	Goals
SV Horn	2013–14	Austrian First League	16	1	3	0	—		—		19	1
SV Horn	2014–15	Austrian First League	6	0	0	0	—		—		6	0
SV Horn	Total		22	1	3	0	—		—		25	1
SV Grödig	2015–16	Austrian Bundesliga	7	0	0	0	—		—		7	0
Wacker Innsbruck	2016–17	Austrian First League	29	1	0	0	—		—		29	1
Wacker Innsbruck	2017–18	Austrian First League	34	2	3	0	—		—		37	2
Wacker Innsbruck	2018–19	Bundesliga	12	2	2	0	—		—		14	2
Wacker Innsbruck	Total		75	3	5	0	—		—		80	5
Wacker Innsbruck II	2016–17	Austrian Regionalliga West	2	1	—		—		—		2	1
VfL Bochum	2018–19	2. Bundesliga	11	1	0	0	—		—		11	1
VfL Bochum	2019–20	2. Bundesliga	0	0	1	0	—		—		1	0
VfL Bochum	Total		11	1	1	0	—		—		12	1
Wolfsberger AC (loan)	2019–20	Austrian Bundesliga	12	0	1	1	0	0	—		13	1
Wolfsberger AC	2020–21	Austrian Bundesliga	28	4	4	2	8 (Note: Appearances in UEFA Europa League)	0	2 (Note: Appearance(s) in Austrian Bundesliga Conference League play-offs)	0	42	6
Wolfsberger AC	2021–22	Austrian Bundesliga	27	1	5	2	—		—		32	3
Wolfsberger AC	2022–23	Austrian Bundesliga	19	0	2	0	3 (Note: Appearances in UEFA Conference League)	1	1	0	25	1
Wolfsberger AC	2023–24	Austrian Bundesliga	30	0	3	1	—		1	0	34	1
Wolfsberger AC	2024–25	Austrian Bundesliga	28	2	5	0	—		—		33	2
Wolfsberger AC	2025–26	Austrian Bundesliga	25	2	3	0	4	0	1	0	33	2
Wolfsberger AC	Total		169	9	23	6	15	1	5	0	212	16
Cracovia	2026–27	Ekstraklasa	0	0	0	0	—		—		0	0
Career total			286	17	32	6	15	1	5	0	338	24

== Honours ==
Wolfsberger AC

- Austrian Cup: 2024–25
