= Boris Matić (footballer) =

Serbian footballer (born 2004)

Personal information
- Date of birth: 19 August 2004 (age 22)
- Place of birth: Belgrade, Serbia and Montenegro
- Height: 1.80 m (5 ft 11 in)
- Position: Right-back

Team information
- Current team: Wolfsberger AC
- Number: 2

Youth career
- 2014–2023: Red Star Belgrade

Senior career*
Years	Team	Apps	(Gls)
2023–2024	Red Star Belgrade	0	(0)
2023–2024	→ RFK Grafičar Beograd (loan)	32	(0)
2024	Wolfsberger AC II	1	(0)
2024–	Wolfsberger AC	46	(1)

International career^{‡}
2025–	Serbia U21	4	(0)
- * Club domestic league appearances and goals as of 10 June 2026 ‡ National team caps and goals as of 15:26, 7 July 2025 (UTC)

Boris Matić (Serbian Cyrillic: Борис Матић; born 19 August 2004) is a Serbian professional football player who plays as a right-back for Austrian Football Bundesliga club Wolfsberger AC.

== Career ==
Matić is a youth product of Red Star Belgrade since the age of 10, having worked his way up all their youth categories. In 2023 he signed a 4-year contract with Red Star, and joined RFK Grafičar Beograd on loan for the 2023–24 season in the Serbian First League. On 27 March 2024, he played with the senior Red Star Belgrade side in a friendly against Zenit St. Petersburg. On 22 June 2024, he transferred to the Austrian Football Bundesliga side Wolfsberger AC on a contract until 2027.

== International career ==
Born in Serbia, Matić holds dual Serbian-Croatian citizenship. He was called up to the Serbia U21s for a set of friendlies in June 2025.

== Honours ==
Wolfsberger AC

- Austrian Cup: 2024–25
