= Herdi Bukusu =

German footballer (born 2000)

Personal information
- Full name: Herdi Bernard Boloko Bukusu
- Date of birth: 3 April 2000 (age 26)
- Place of birth: Aachen, Germany
- Height: 1.81 m (5 ft 11 in)
- Position: Forward

Team information
- Current team: FSV Frankfurt
- Number: 20

Youth career
- –2011: Alemannia Aachen
- 2011–2019: Bayer Leverkusen

Senior career*
Years	Team	Apps	(Gls)
2019–2021	Hamburger SV II	9	(0)
2021–2022	Virton	7	(0)
2022–2024	Bremer SV	40	(11)
2024–2025	VfB Lübeck	30	(5)
2025–	FSV Frankfurt	17	(2)
- * Club domestic league appearances and goals as of 26 June 2026

Herdi Bernard Boloko Bukusu (born 3 April 2000) is a German professional footballer who plays as a forward for FSV Frankfurt.

== International career ==
Born in Germany, Bukusu is of Angolan descent. He has represented Germany at youth international level.

== Personal life ==
He is the brother of fellow professional footballer Kevin Bukusu.

== Career statistics ==
As of 16 August 2021

Appearances and goals by club, season and competition
Club	Season	League			Cup		Other		Total	
Club	Season	Division	Apps	Goals	Apps	Goals	Apps	Goals	Apps	Goals
Hamburger SV II	2019–20	Regionalliga	5	0	–		0	0	5	0
Hamburger SV II	2020–21	Regionalliga	4	0	–		0	0	4	0
Hamburger SV II	Total		9	0	0	0	0	0	9	0
Virton	2021–22	Proximus League	1	0	0	0	0	0	1	0
Career total			10	0	0	0	0	0	10	0
