= Chibuike Nwaiwu =

Nigerian footballer (born 2003)

Personal information
- Full name: Chibuike Godfrey Nwaiwu
- Date of birth: 23 July 2003 (age 23)
- Place of birth: Port Harcourt, Nigeria
- Height: 1.93 m (6 ft 4 in)
- Position: Centre-back

Team information
- Current team: Trabzonspor
- Number: 27

Youth career
- Borussia Digitals Sporting Academy

Senior career*
Years	Team	Apps	(Gls)
2021–2022	Heartland	17	(0)
2022–2024	Enyimba	43	(1)
2024–2026	Wolfsberger AC	25	(2)
2026–	Trabzonspor	24	(4)

International career^{‡}
2026–	Nigeria	3	(0)
- * Club domestic league appearances and goals as of 17:02, 12 May 2026 (UTC) ‡ National team caps and goals as of 15:26, 30 May 2026 (UTC)

Chibuike Godfrey Nwaiwu (born 23 July 2003) is a Nigerian professional football player who plays as a centre-back for Süper Lig club Trabzonspor and the Nigeria national team.

== Career ==
Nwaiwu began his senior career in Nigeria with Heartland F.C. in 2021. On 22 October 2022, he transferred to Enyimba and helped them win the 2022–23 Nigeria Professional Football League. On 4 September 2024, he transferred to the Austrian Football Bundesliga club Wolfsberger AC on a contract until 2027. He started in the final as Wolfsberg won the 2024–25 Austrian Cup, their first ever domestic trophy.

== International career ==
On 3 March 2023, Nwaiwu was called up to the Nigeria U23s for a set of Football at the 2024 Summer Olympics – Men's qualification matches.

== Career statistics ==
=== International ===
As of match played 30 May 2026

Appearances and goals by national team and year
National team	Year	Apps	Goals
Nigeria	2026	3	0
Total		3	0

== Honours ==
Enyimba

- Nigeria Premier Football League: 2022–23

Wolfsberger AC

- Austrian Cup: 2024–25

Trabzonspor

- Turkish Cup: 2025–26
