= Abdellah Baallal =

Moroccan footballer (born 2004)

Personal information
- Date of birth: 7 November 2004 (age 22)
- Place of birth: Casablanca, Morocco
- Position: Midfielder

Team information
- Current team: Clermont
- Number: 2

Youth career
- –2023: Mohammed VI Academy

Senior career*
Years	Team	Apps	(Gls)
2023–	Clermont B	31	(2)
2023–	Clermont	28	(1)
2024–2025	→ Austria Lustenau (loan)	13	(1)

International career^{‡}
2022	Morocco U20	4	(0)
- * Club domestic league appearances and goals as of 12 May 2026 ‡ National team caps and goals as of 24 September 2022

Abdellah Baallal (born 7 November 2004) is a Moroccan professional footballer who plays as a midfielder for Ligue 2 club Clermont.

== Club career ==
A product of the Mohammed VI Academy, Baallal joined French club Clermont on 3 February 2023, signing a three-year contract. He made his Ligue 1 debut on 29 November 2023 in a 1–1 draw against Montpellier.

For the 2024–25 season, Ballal joined Austria Lustenau in Austria on loan.

== International career ==
Baallal is a youth international for Morocco, having represented the country at under-20 level in 2022.
