= Dominik Kirnbauer =

Austrian footballer (born 2002)

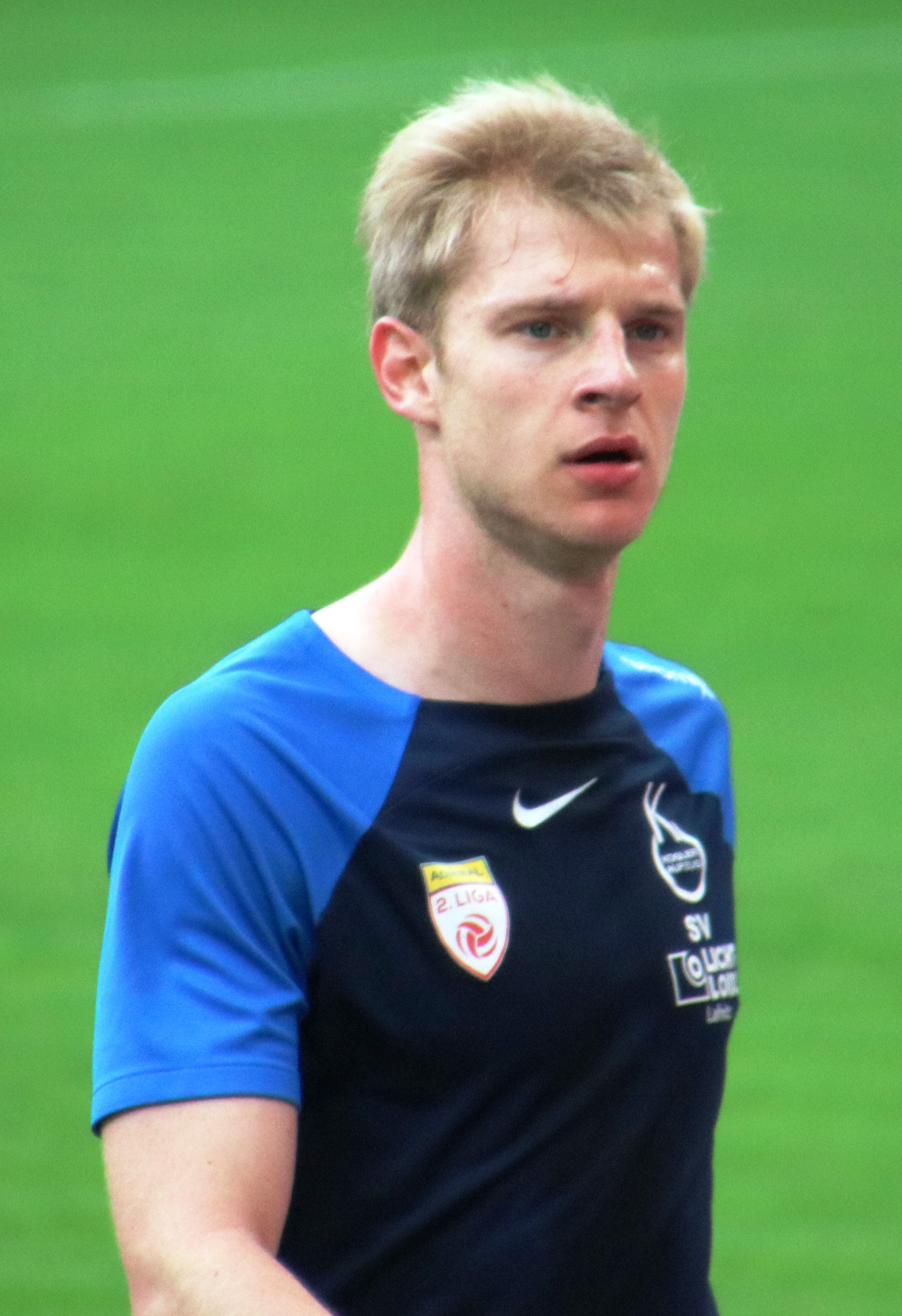
- Kirnbauer in 2024

Personal information
- Date of birth: 28 August 2002 (age 24)
- Place of birth: Oberwart, Austria
- Height: 1.74 m (5 ft 9 in)
- Position: Defender

Team information
- Current team: FAC
- Number: 24

Youth career
- 2008–2015: SC Bad Tatzmannsdorf
- 2015–2020: TSV Hartberg

Senior career*
Years	Team	Apps	(Gls)
2020	TSV Hartberg	2	(0)
2020–2023	SV Lafnitz	39	(2)
2023–2025	ASK Voitsberg	58	(4)
2025–2026	SV Ried	6	(0)
2026–	FAC	2	(0)
- * Club domestic league appearances and goals as of 7 September 2026

Dominik Kirnbauer (born 28 August 2002) is an Austrian professional footballer who plays as a defender for 2. Liga club Floridsdorfer AC.

== Career ==
Kirnbauer began his youth career with SC Bad Tatzmannsdorf, moving to TSV Hartberg's youth academy for the 2015–16 season. He debuted for Hartberg's reserve team in April 2018 in the fifth-tier Oberliga, making three appearances that season. In 2018–19, he played 15 matches for Hartberg's reserves, scoring once.

In the shortened 2019–20 amateur season, he appeared in 13 matches. On 28 June 2020, he made his professional Austrian Bundesliga debut, replacing Bakary Nimaga in the 61st minute against Red Bull Salzburg.

Ahead of the 2020–21 season, Kirnbauer joined 2. Liga club SV Lafnitz, where he made six league appearances in his first season. He also attended the Burgenländisches Schulsportmodell (BSSM), a high school for elite athletes in Oberschützen.

For the 2023–24 season, he signed with Austrian Regionalliga club ASK Voitsberg. He achieved promotion to the 2. Liga in his first season at the club.

On 20 August 2026, Kirnbauer signed for Floridsdorfer AC on a one-year contract.

== Career statistics ==
As of 29 June 2020.

Appearances and goals by club, season and competition
Club	Season	League			Cup		Continental		Other		Total	
Club	Season	Division	Apps	Goals	Apps	Goals	Apps	Goals	Apps	Goals	Apps	Goals
TSV Hartberg	2019–20	Bundesliga	1	0	0	0	–		0	0	1	0
Career total			1	0	0	0	0	0	0	0	1	0
