= David Bumberger =

Austrian association footballer

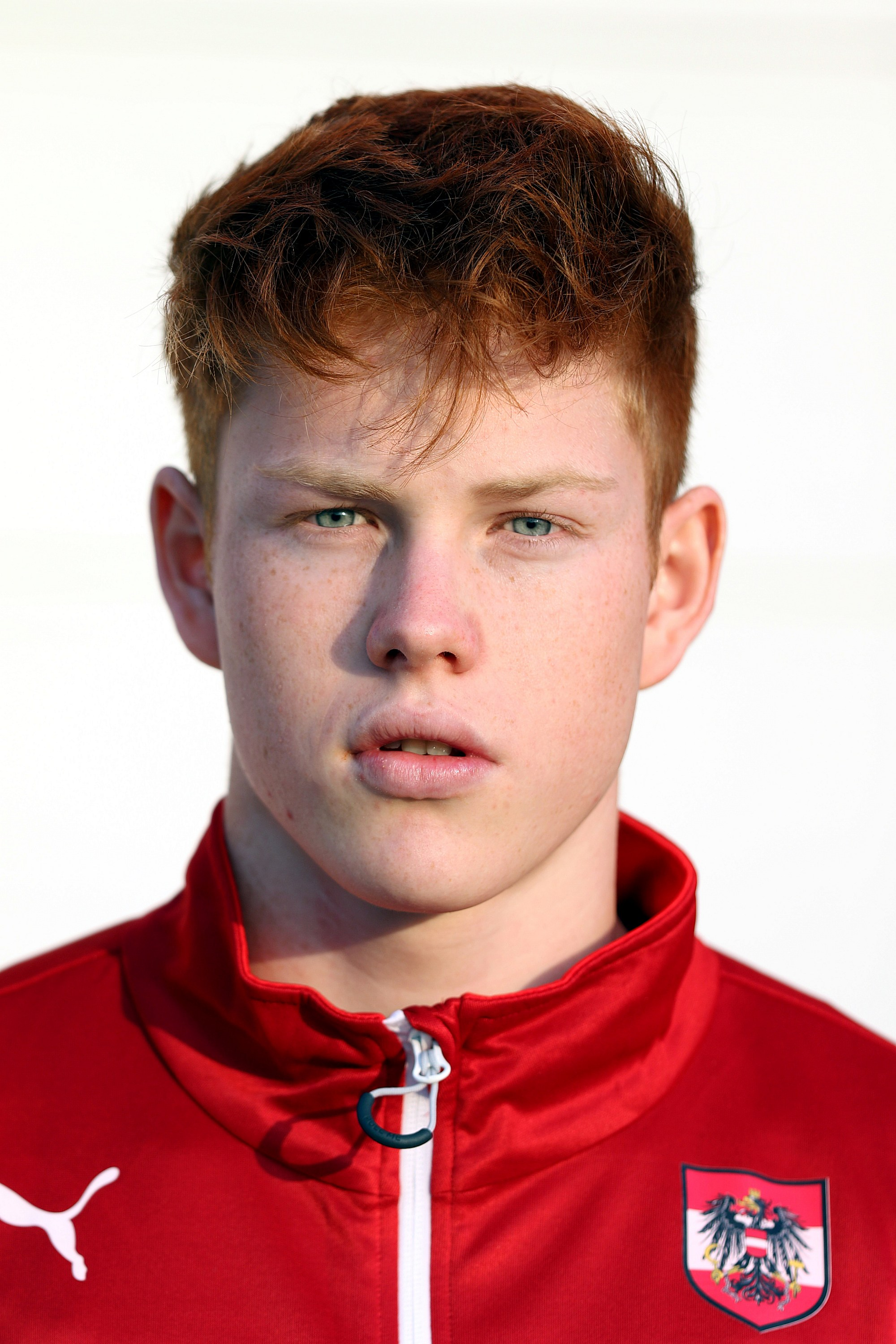
- Bumberger in 2017

Personal information
- Date of birth: 5 February 1999 (age 27)
- Place of birth: Rohrbach, Austria
- Height: 1.85 m (6 ft 1 in)
- Position: Centre-back

Team information
- Current team: Blau-Weiß Linz
- Number: 23

Youth career
- 2005–2009: DSG Union Putzleinsdorf
- 2009–2012: LASK
- 2012–2014: Red Bull Salzburg
- 2014–2018: AKA Linz

Senior career*
Years	Team	Apps	(Gls)
2018–2020	Juniors OÖ	65	(1)
2020–2023	Rheindorf Altach	23	(1)
2022–2023	→ Vorwärts Steyr (loan)	9	(2)
2023	Vorwärts Steyr	14	(1)
2023–2025	Ried	50	(5)
2025–	Blau-Weiß Linz	16	(1)

International career^{‡}
2016–2017	Austria U18	5	(0)
2017	Austria U19	1	(0)
- * Club domestic league appearances and goals as of 10 June 2026 ‡ National team caps and goals as of 04:40, 11 July 2022 (UTC)

David Bumberger (born 5 February 1999) is an Austrian professional footballer who plays as a centre-back for Blau-Weiß Linz.

== Career ==
Bumberger is a product of the youth academies of DSG Union Putzleinsdorf, LASK, Red Bull Salzburg and AKA Linz. He began his senior career with Juniors OÖ. He made his professional debut with Juniors OÖ in a 2–2 2. Liga tie with Floridsdorfer AC on 12 August 2018. He extended his contract with their then senior team, LASK, on 5 May 2020. On 5 October 2020, he transferred to Rheindorf Altach in the Austrian Football Bundesliga.

On 5 January 2023, Bumberger signed a 1.5-year contract with Vorwärts Steyr after playing for the club on loan earlier in the season.

== International career ==
Bumberger is a youth international for Austria, having played for the Austria U18s and U19s.
