= Kevin Bukusu =

German footballer (born 2001)

Personal information
- Full name: Kevin Vangu Phambu Bukusu
- Date of birth: 27 February 2001 (age 25)
- Place of birth: Aachen, Germany
- Height: 1.88 m (6 ft 2 in)
- Position: Defender

Team information
- Current team: RWDM Brussels
- Number: 17

Youth career
- 2008–2010: Alemannia Aachen
- 2010–2014: Westwacht Aachen
- 2014–2020: Bayer Leverkusen

Senior career*
| Years | Team | Apps | (Gls) |
| 2020–2022 | NEC | 17 | (0) |
| 2021–2022 | → Helmond Sport (loan) | 13 | (0) |
| 2022–2024 | Wolfsberger AC II | 9 | (0) |
| 2022–2024 | Wolfsberger AC | 8 | (0) |
| 2024 | Žalgiris | 0 | (0) |
| 2024 | VfB Lübeck II | 1 | (0) |
| 2024–2025 | VfB Lübeck | 21 | (1) |
| 2025–2026 | Seraing | 18 | (0) |
| 2026– | RWDM Brussels | 5 | (1) |

International career
| 2016–2017 | Germany U16 | 3 | (1) |
| 2017–2018 | Germany U17 | 9 | (0) |
- * Club domestic league appearances and goals as of 30 September 2026

Kevin Vangu Phambu Bukusu (born 27 February 2001) is a German professional footballer who plays as a defender for Belgian Division 1 club RWDM Brussels.

== Club career ==
Bukusu have played youth football for several clubs, including Bayer Leverkusen. On 17 July 2020, Eerste Divisie club NEC Nijmegen announced the signing of Bukusu on a two-year deal. He made his professional debut on 3 October 2020 in a 6–0 league win against FC Eindhoven. On 30 August 2021, he joined Helmond Sport on a season-long loan.

On 1 September 2022, Bukusu joined Austrian club Wolfsberger AC on a free transfer. On 2 February 2024, Bukusu moved to Žalgiris in Lithuania. In August 2025, he joined Belgian club Seraing on a one-year contract.

== International career ==
Born in Germany, Bukusu is of Angolan descent. He is a former German youth international. He was part of Germany U17 team for the 2018 UEFA European Under-17 Championship.

In August 2021, Bukusu was called up to Angola national team for 2022 FIFA World Cup qualification matches against Egypt and Libya.

== Personal life ==
Bukusu's elder brother Herdi is also a professional footballer.
