= Lukas Gütlbauer =

Austrian footballer (born 2001)

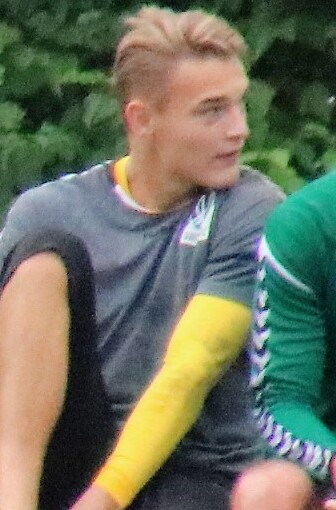
- Gütlbauer in 2019

Personal information
- Date of birth: 6 December 2000 (age 25)
- Place of birth: Kirchdorf an der Krems, Austria
- Height: 1.92 m (6 ft 4 in)
- Position: Goalkeeper

Team information
- Current team: Wolfsberger AC
- Number: 1

Youth career
- 2008–2014: TuS Kremsmünster
- 2014–2018: Ried

Senior career*
Years	Team	Apps	(Gls)
2018–2020	Ried II	22	(0)
2019–2022	Ried	1	(0)
2021–2022	→Floridsdorfer AC (loan)	28	(0)
2022–	Wolfsberger AC	14	(0)
- * Club domestic league appearances and goals as of 10 June 2026

Lukas Gütlbauer (born 6 December 2000) is an Austrian professional football player who plays as a goalkeeper for Austrian Football Bundesliga club Wolfsberger AC.

== Career ==
Gütlbauer is a youth product of TuS Kremsmünster and Ried. In 2018, he was promoted to Ried's reserves in the Austrian Regionalliga. In 2019, he was promoted to their senior team as third goalkeeper as the club won the 2019–20 Austrian Football Second League. On 8 August 2020, he signed his first professional contract with Ried until 2022. He made his senior and professional debut with Ried in an Austrian Football Bundesliga loss to SC Rheindorf Altach on 15 May 2021. On 2 June 2021, he joined Floridsdorfer AC on a season-long loan in the 2. Liga. With FAC, he was named the 2021–22 Austrian Football Second League Goalkeeper of the Season. On 22 June 2022, he transferred to Wolfsberger AC in the Austrian Bundesliga on a contract until 2024. On 27 September 2023, he extended his contract with WAC until 2027.

== International career ==
In March 2021, Gütlbauer was called up to the Austria U21s for a set of 2023 UEFA European Under-21 Championship qualification matches.

== Honours ==
Ried

- 2. Liga: 2019–20

Wolfsberger AC

- Austrian Cup: 2024–25

Individual

- 2021–22 Austrian Football Second League Goalkeeper of the Season
