= Adis Jašić =

Austrian footballer (born 2003)

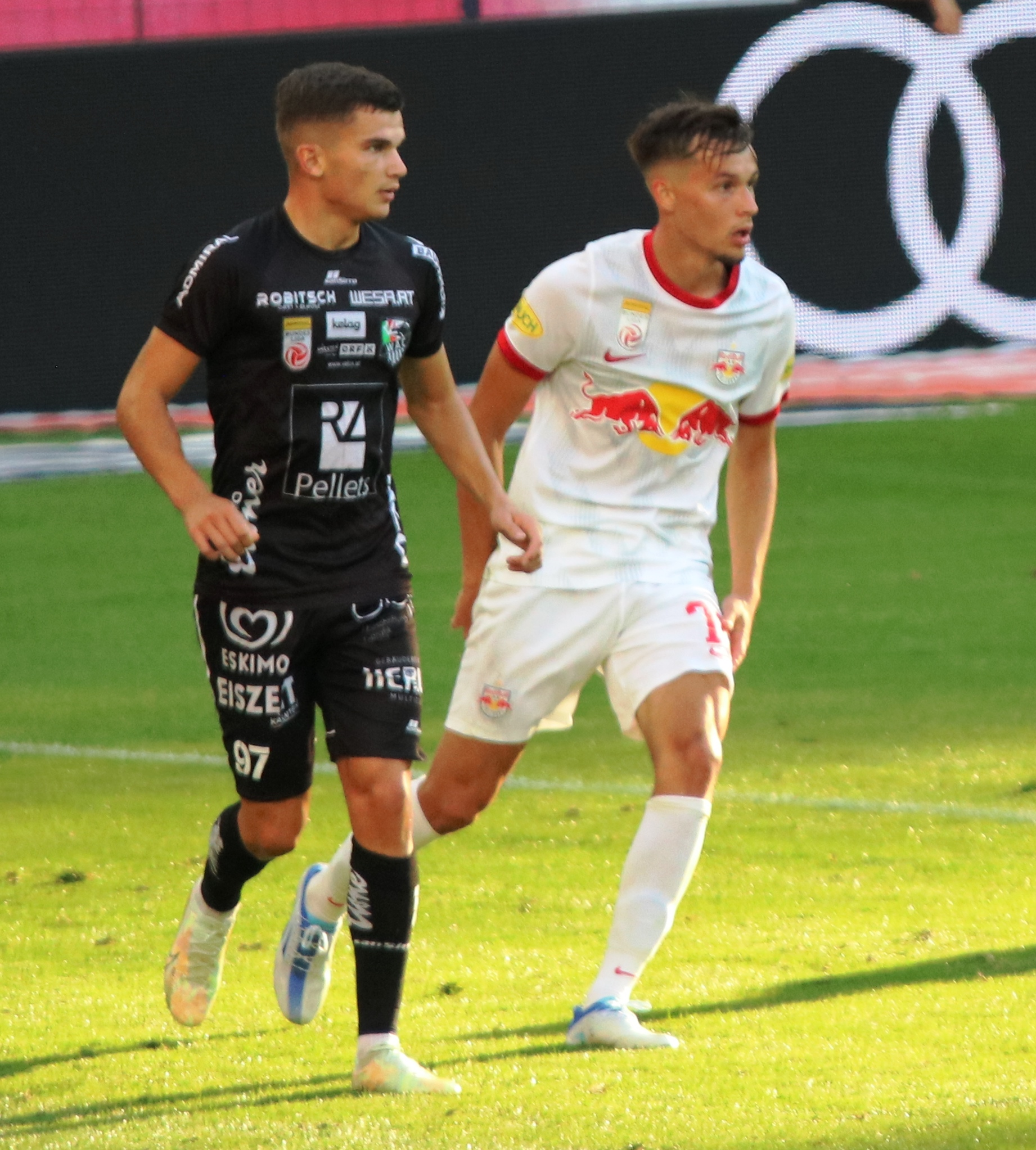
- Adis Jašić (left), 2022

Personal information
- Date of birth: 12 February 2003 (age 23)
- Place of birth: Sankt Veit an der Glan, Austria
- Height: 1.78 m (5 ft 10 in)
- Position: Midfielder

Team information
- Current team: Al Ain
- Number: 97

Youth career
- 2009–2015: FC St. Veit
- 2015–2016: VST Völkermarkt
- 2016–2020: Wolfsberger AC

Senior career*
Years	Team	Apps	(Gls)
2020–2021	Wolfsberger AC II	14	(3)
2021–2025	Wolfsberger AC	105	(8)
2025–	Al Ain	13	(0)

International career^{‡}
2019	Austria U17	4	(0)
2021–2022	Austria U19	12	(4)
2022	Austria U21	2	(0)
- * Club domestic league appearances and goals as of 16 March 2026 ‡ National team caps and goals as of 27 September 2022

Adis Jašić (pronounced [ǎdis jâːʃitɕ]; born 12 February 2003) is an Austrian professional footballer who plays as a midfielder for UAE Pro League side Al Ain.

Jašić started his professional career at Wolfsberger AC, playing first in its reserve team.

== Club career ==
=== Early career ===
Jašić started playing football at his hometown club FC St. Veit, before joining VST Völkermarkt's youth setup in 2015. In 2016, he moved to Wolfsberger AC's youth academy. He made his professional debut against Sturm Graz on 21 April 2021 at the age of 18. On 7 November 2021, he scored his first professional goal in a triumph over Rapid Wien.

In June 2025, Jašić signed a three-year contract with UAE Pro League side Al Ain.

== International career ==
Despite representing Austria at all youth levels, Jašić decided to play for Bosnia and Herzegovina at the senior level.

== Career statistics ==
=== Club ===
As of match played 11 May 2024

Appearances and goals by club, season and competition
Club	Season	League			Austrian Cup		Continental		Other		Total	
Club	Season	Division	Apps	Goals	Apps	Goals	Apps	Goals	Apps	Goals	Apps	Goals
Wolfsberger AC II	2020–21	Regionalliga Mitte	11	1	–		–		–		11	1
Wolfsberger AC II	2021–22	Regionalliga Mitte	3	2	–		–		–		3	2
Wolfsberger AC II	Total		14	3	–		–		–		14	3
Wolfsberger AC	2020–21	Austrian Bundesliga	6	0	–		–		1 (Note: Appearance in Austrian Bundesliga play-offs for UEFA Europa Conference League)	0	7	0
Wolfsberger AC	2021–22	Austrian Bundesliga	21	2	3	1	–		–		24	3
Wolfsberger AC	2022–23	Austrian Bundesliga	24	2	3	0	4 (Note: Appearances in UEFA Europa Conference League)	0	1	0	32	2
Wolfsberger AC	2023–24	Austrian Bundesliga	29	2	3	0	–		–		32	2
Wolfsberger AC	Total		80	6	9	1	4	0	2	0	95	7
Career total			94	9	9	1	4	0	2	0	109	10
