= Wallern an der Trattnach =

- Municipality
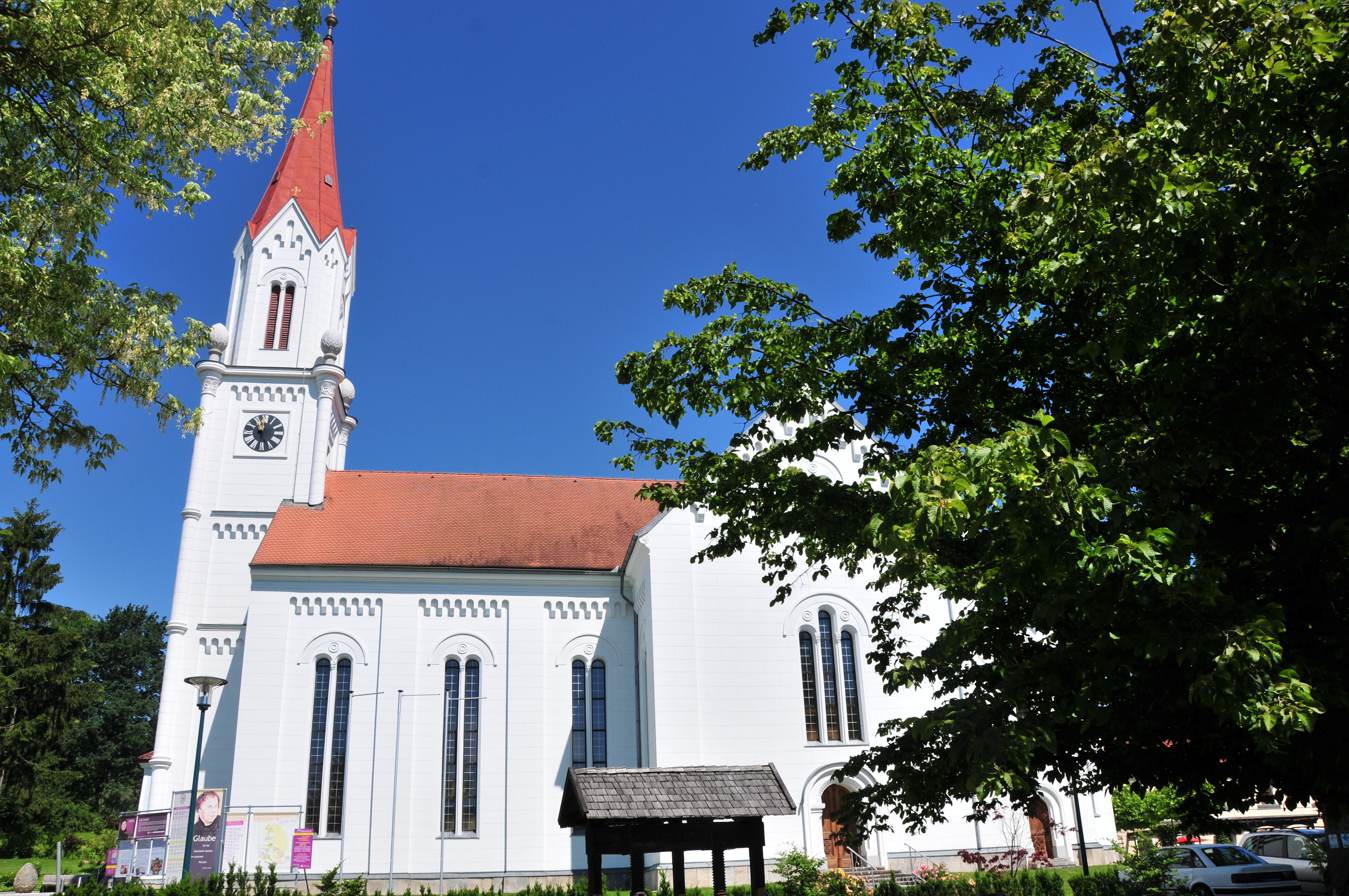

- Coat of arms

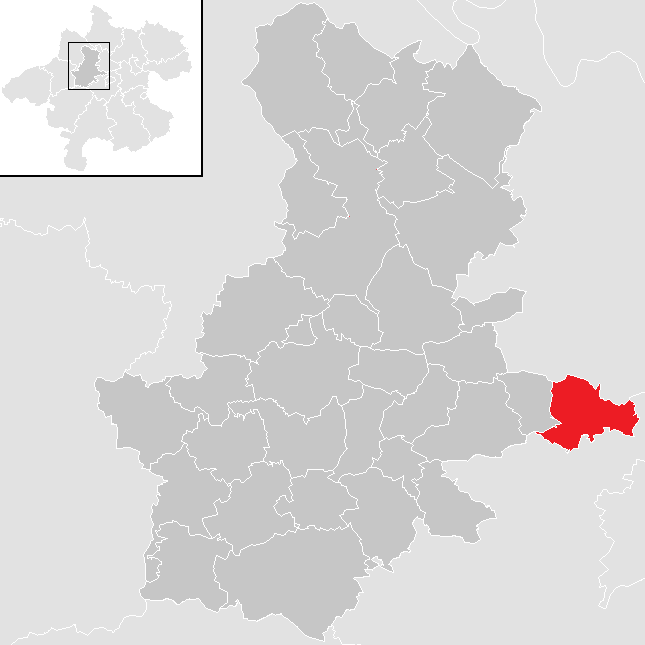
- Location in the district

- Location within Austria
- Coordinates: 48°13′54″N 13°56′55″E
- Country: Austria
- State: Upper Austria
- District: Grieskirchen

Government
  - Mayor: Dominik Richtsteiger (ÖVP)

Area
  - Total: 14.63 km^{2} (5.65 sq mi)
- Elevation: 298 m (978 ft)

Population (2018-01-01)
  - Total: 3,039
  - Density: 207.7/km^{2} (538.0/sq mi)
- Time zone: UTC+1 (CET)
  - Summer (DST): UTC+2 (CEST)
- Postal code: 4702
- Area code: 07249
- Vehicle registration: GR
- Website: www.wallern.ooe.gv.at

Wallern an der Trattnach is a municipality in the district of Grieskirchen in the Austrian state of Upper Austria.

== Geography ==
About 10 percent of the municipality is forest, and 76 percent is farmland.
