= Thomas Sabitzer =

Austrian footballer

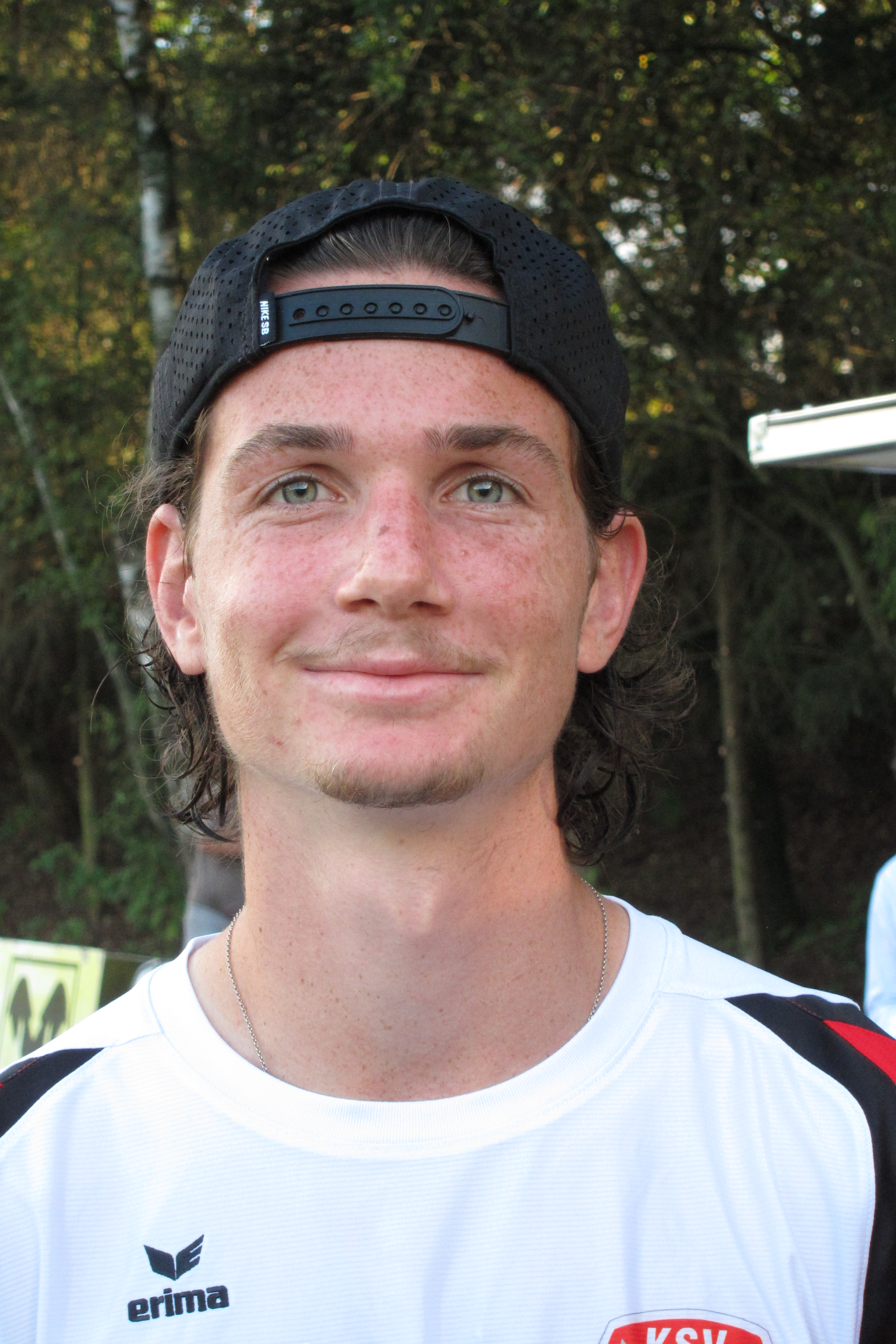
- Sabitzer with Kapfenberger SV II in 2016

Personal information
- Date of birth: 12 October 2000 (age 26)
- Place of birth: Austria
- Height: 1.82 m (6 ft 0 in)
- Position: Winger

Team information
- Current team: WSG Tirol
- Number: 10

Youth career
- 2007–2010: USC St. Georgen/Judenburg
- 2010–2012: FC Judenburg
- 2012–2016: Sturm Graz

Senior career*
Years	Team	Apps	(Gls)
2016–2017	Kapfenberger SV II	35	(7)
2016–2019	Kapfenberger SV	39	(12)
2019–2023	LASK	14	(0)
2021–2022	→ WSG Tirol (loan)	27	(8)
2022–2023	→ WSG Tirol (loan)	22	(4)
2023–2025	Wolfsberger AC	37	(2)
2025–	WSG Tirol	26	(0)

International career^{‡}
2019–2021	Austria U21	4	(0)
- * Club domestic league appearances and goals as of 10 June 2026 ‡ National team caps and goals as of 12 November 2021

Thomas Sabitzer (born 12 October 2000) is an Austrian professional footballer who plays as a winger for Austrian Bundesliga club WSG Tirol.

== Club career ==
He made his Austrian Football First League debut for Kapfenberger SV on 25 August 2017 in a game against Hartberg.

On 1 June 2021, he joined WSG Tirol on a season-long loan.

On 8 June 2023, Sabitzer signed a three-year contract with Wolfsberger AC.

Sabitzer rejoined WSG Tirol for the 2025-26 Austrian 1st tier season.

== Personal life ==
Sabitzer is the cousin of the footballer Marcel Sabitzer.

== Career statistics ==
=== Club ===
As of 8 October 2020

Appearances and goals by club, season and competition
Club	Season	League			Cup		Continental		Other		Total	
Club	Season	Division	Apps	Goals	Apps	Goals	Apps	Goals	Apps	Goals	Apps	Goals
Kapfenberger SV	2017–18	2. Liga	12	0	0	0	—		—		12	0
Kapfenberger SV	2018–19	2. Liga	27	12	3	1	—		—		30	13
Kapfenberger SV	Total		39	12	3	1	—		—		42	13
LASK	2019–20	Austrian Bundesliga	10	0	1	0	3	0	—		14	0
LASK	2020–21	Austrian Bundesliga	1	0	0	0	1	1	—		2	1
LASK	Total		11	0	1	0	4	1	0	0	16	1
Career total			50	12	4	1	4	1	0	0	58	14
