= SV Wallern =

Austrian football club

SV Wallern is a football team based in Austria.

It currently plays in the 4th tier OÖ Liga.
