= 2026–27 SV Ried season =

SV Ried
2026–27 season
- Manager: Mario Despotović
- Stadium: BWT X Upper Austrian Arena
- Austrian Bundesliga: 7th
- Austrian Cup: Third round
- Top goalscorer: League: Pape Sissoko; Stefan Schwab; Evan Eghosa Aisowieren (2 each); All: Evan Eghosa Aisowieren (5)
- Highest home attendance: 6,528 (vs. Rapid Wien, 9 August 2026)
- Lowest home attendance: 3,864 (vs. Wolfsberger AC, 20 September 2026)
- Average home league attendance: 5,162
- Biggest win: 5–1 (vs. FC Dornbirn, 24 July 2026) (vs. SPG Wallern/St. Marienkirchen, 4 September 2026)
- Biggest defeat: 4–1 (vs. LASK, 14 August 2026)
- All statistics correct as of 20 September 2026.

The 2026–27 season is the 115th season in the history of SV Ried, and the club's second consecutive season in the Austrian Football Bundesliga. In addition to the domestic league, the team is scheduled to participate in the Austrian Cup.

== Transfers ==
=== In ===
Pos.	Player	Transferred from	Fee	Date	Source
MF	(Iraq) Jussef Nasrawe	(Germany) FC Bayern Munich II	€100,000	26 May 2026	
DF	(Austria) Lukas Malicsek	(Austria) Admira Wacker	Undisclosed	16 June 2026	
MF	(Austria) Stefan Schwab	(Germany) Holstein Kiel	Free	25 June 2026	
FW	(South Africa) Jaedin Rhodes	(South Africa) Cape Town City	Undisclosed	26 June 2026	
DF	(Faroe Islands) Samuel Chukwudi	(Finland) SJK Seinäjoki	Undisclosed	30 June 2026	
DF	(Austria) Oliver Sorg	(Germany) Augsburg	Undisclosed	6 July 2026	
FW	(Mali) Pape Sissoko	(France) Stade Reims	Loan	13 July 2026	
FW	(Denmark) Tobias Lund Jensen	(Belgium) Club NXT	Loan	16 July 2026	
DF	(Austria) Dejan Radonjić	Austria Wien	€200,000	1 August 2026	
FW	(Croatia) Tino Kusanović	(Germany) 1. FC Nürnberg	Loan	5 August 2026	
DF	(Croatia) Luka Capan	(Serbia) FK TSC	Free	2 September 2026	

=== Out ===
Pos.	Player	Transferred to	Fee	Date	Source
DF	(Japan) Nikki Havenaar	(Belgium) Union Saint-Gilloise	€400,000	26 May 2026	
MF	(Austria) Nicolas Bajlicz	(Austria) Rapid Wien	€100,000	1 June 2026	
MF	(Austria) Christopher Wernitznig	(Austria) Hertha Wels	Free	4 June 2026	
FW	(South Africa) Antonio Van Wyk	(South Africa) Mamelodi Sundowns	€1,000,000	16 June 2026	
GK	(Austria) Marcel Köstenbauer	(Austria) Blau-Weiß Linz	Free	22 June 2026	
DF	(Austria) Jonathan Scherzer		Released	1 July 2026	
DF	(Austria) Philip Weissenbacher	(Austria) Kapfenberger SV	Loan	7 July 2026	
MF	(Cameroon) Loiange Ondoa	(Kosovo) Ferizaj	Free	4 August 2026	
MF	(Austria) Nevio Zotz	(Austria) Hertha Wels	Loan	13 August 2026	
FW	(Germany) Saliou Sané	(Switzerland) YF Juventus	Free	17 August 2026	
MF	(Austria) Jonas Mayer	(Austria) Blau-Weiß Linz	Loan	19 August 2026	
DF	(Austria) Dominik Kirnbauer	(Austria) FAC	Undisclosed	20 August 2026	
DF	(Austria) Michael Sollbauer	(Austria) Grazer AK	Free	2 September 2026	

== Pre-season and friendlies ==
26 June 2026 Friendly	SV Ried (Austria)	2–2	Austria Salzburg
16:00	Abubakar 64'; Lechner 90'	Report	10'; 31'

3 July 2026 Friendly	Jahn Regensburg (Germany)	4–2	(Austria) SV Ried
15:00	Bauer 47'; Dietz 60'; Hermes 90+16', 90+24'	Report	Weissenbacher 22'; Schwab 41'

10 July 2026 Friendly	SV Ried (Austria)	1–1	(Turkey) İstanbul Başakşehir
15:00	Schwab 63' (pen.)	Report	Selke 47' (pen.)

10 July 2026 Friendly	SV Ried (Austria)	2–1	(Turkey) İstanbul Başakşehir
17:00	Abubakar 43'; Zotz 90'	Report	Yıldırım 67'

17 July 2026 Friendly	SV Ried (Austria)	3–0	(Germany) RW Essen
17:00	Rhodes 29'; Bajic 59'; Sissoko 86'	Report

18 July 2026 Friendly	Mladá Boleslav (Czech Republic)	4–0	(Austria) SV Ried
14:00	Klíma 59'; Langhamer 64', 72'; Kolářík 85'	Report

== Competitions ==
=== Overall record ===
Competition	First match	Last match	Starting round	Record							
Competition	First match	Last match	Starting round	Pld	W	D	L	GF	GA	GD	Win %
Austrian Football Bundesliga	2 August 2026		Matchday 1	7	2	2	3	11	12	−1	28.57
Austrian Cup	24 July 2026		First round	2	2	0	0	10	2	+8	100.00
Total				9	4	2	3	21	14	+7	44.44

Last updated: 20 September 2026
Source: Soccerway

=== Austrian Football Bundesliga ===
==== League table ====
Pos	Team	Pld	W	D	L	GF	GA	GD	Pts	Qualification
4	TSV Hartberg	12	6	2	4	23	19	+4	20	Qualification for the Championship round
5	Sturm Graz	12	5	4	3	22	17	+5	19	Qualification for the Championship round
6	SV Ried	12	4	4	4	21	22	−1	16	Qualification for the Championship round
7	WSG Tirol	12	3	4	5	15	18	−3	13	Qualification for the Relegation round
8	Austria Lustenau	12	3	2	7	15	30	−15	11	Qualification for the Relegation round

Updated to match(es) played on 8 November 2026. Source: Austrian Football Bundesliga
Rules for classification: 1) Points; 2) Head-to-head record; 3) Goal difference; 4) Goals scored; 5) Matches won; 6) Away matches won; 7) Away goals scored.

==== Results summary ====
Overall								Home						Away					
Pld	W	D	L	GF	GA	GD	Pts	W	D	L	GF	GA	GD	W	D	L	GF	GA	GD
7	2	2	3	11	12	−1	8	2	1	1	7	4	+3	0	1	2	4	8	−4

Last updated: 20 September 2026.
Source: ADMIRAL Bundesliga

==== Results by round ====
Round	1	2	3	4	5	6	7
Ground	A	H	A	H	A	H	H
Result	D	L	L	W	L	D	W
Position	5	8	10	8	8	10	7

Updated to match(es) played on 20 September 2026. Source: ADMIRAL Bundesliga
A = Away; H = Home; W = Win; D = Draw; L = Loss

==== Matches ====
2 August 2026 1	Austria Lustenau	1–1	SV Ried	Lustenau
17:00	Weixelbraun 26'; Danilo (yellow card) 45+2'; Diarra (yellow card) 79'	Report	Nasrawe 33'; Rossdorfer (yellow card) 77'; Jensen (yellow card) 83'	Stadium: Reichshofstadion; Attendance: 4,137; Referee: Harald Lechner

9 August 2026 2	SV Ried	1–2	Rapid Wien	Ried im Innkreis
17:00	Schwab 75'; Rasner (yellow card) 86'	Report	Horn 8'; Haïdara 77'; Bolla (yellow card) 86'	Stadium: BWT X Upper Austrian Arena; Attendance: 6,528; Referee: Walter Altmann

14 August 2026 3	LASK	4–1	SV Ried	Linz
19:30	Adeniran 10', 27'; Usor 18'; Lang 57'; Ljubičić (red card) 74'	Report	Sissoko 8'; Malicsek (yellow card) 70'; Chukwudi (yellow card) 73'; Boguo (yellow card) 90+2'	Stadium: Raiffeisen Arena; Attendance: 14,507; Referee: Alain Sadikovski

21 August 2026 4	SV Ried	1–0	Grazer AK	Ried im Innkreis
19:30	Chukwudi (yellow card) 5'; Sissoko (yellow card) 45+1', (goal) 45+1' (pen.); Kusanović (yellow card) 90+3'	Report	Oberleitner (yellow card) 33'; Anderson (yellow card) 39'; Michorl (yellow card) 45+1'; Owusu (yellow card) 58'	Stadium: BWT X Upper Austrian Arena; Attendance: 4,215; Referee: Daniel Pfister

30 August 2026 5	TSV Hartberg	3–2	SV Ried	Hartberg
17:00	Hoffmann 6' (pen.), 38'; Diarra (yellow card) 12'; Karner 71'	Report	Malicsek (yellow card) 5'; Chukwudi 11'; Sissoko (yellow card) 34'; Eghosa Aisowieren 64'	Stadium: Profertil Arena Hartberg; Attendance: 2,390; Referee: Arnes Talic

11 September 2026 6	SV Ried	1–1	Red Bull Salzburg	Ried im Innkreis
19:30	Schwab (yellow card) 66'; Pomer 86'; Boguo (yellow card) 90+3'	Report	Kitano (yellow card) 64'; Barry (yellow card) 66'; Konaté 84'; Veratschnig (yellow card) 90+3'	Stadium: BWT X Upper Austrian Arena; Attendance: 6,041; Referee: Julian Schnur

20 September 2026 7	SV Ried	4–1	Wolfsberger AC	Ried im Innkreis
14:30	Bajic 3'; Aisowieren 9'; Schwab 40' (pen.), (yellow card) 42'; Steurer (yellow card) 75'; Thelin 81', (yellow card) 85'	Report	Gütlbauer (yellow card) 38'; Fitz (yellow card) 45'; Kitz (yellow card) 56', (goal) 87'; Piesinger (yellow card) 58'	Stadium: BWT X Upper Austrian Arena; Attendance: 3,864; Referee: Alexander Harkam

=== Austrian Cup ===
24 July 2026 First round	FC Dornbirn 1913	1–5	SV Ried	Dornbirn
18:30	Herbaly 55'	Report	Eghosa Aisowieren 36', 45'; Chukwudi 58'; Malicsek 72'; Jensen 90+3'	Stadium: Sparkasse Arena; Attendance: 800; Referee: Paul Nisandzic

4 September 2026 Second round	SPG Wallern/St. Marienkirchen	1–5	SV Ried	Wallern an der Trattnach
19:00	Straif (yellow card) 12'; Misic 78'	Report	Eghosa Aisowieren 16'; Straif 34' (o.g.); Rasner 35'; Pomer 38'; Schwab 57'; Kusanović (yellow card) 86'	Stadium: Sportanlage Wallern; Attendance: 1,403; Referee: Samuel Sampl

27 October 2026 Third round	LASK	v	SV Ried	Linz
TBC		Report		Stadium: Raiffeisen Arena

== Statistics ==
=== Appearances and goals ===
As of match played 20 September 2026

Players with no appearances are not included on the list
Italics indicate a loaned in player

No.	Pos	Nat	Player	Total		Bundesliga		Austrian Cup	
No.	Pos	Nat	Player	Apps	Goals	Apps	Goals	Apps	Goals
1	GK	(Austria) AUT	Andreas Leitner	9	0	7+0	0	2+0	0
4	DF	(Austria) AUT	Lukas Malicsek	8	1	5+2	0	1+0	1
5	DF	(Austria) AUT	Dejan Radonjić	4	0	3+1	0	0+0	0
6	MF	(South Africa) RSA	Yusuf Maart	9	0	7+0	0	2+0	0
7	DF	(Austria) AUT	Oliver Sorg	6	0	5+0	0	1+0	0
8	MF	(Austria) AUT	Martin Rasner	9	1	2+5	0	1+1	1
9	FW	(Mali) MLI	Pape Sissoko	8	2	4+3	2	0+1	0
10	MF	(Iraq) IRQ	Jussef Nasrawe	6	1	5+0	1	1+0	0
11	MF	(South Africa) RSA	Jaedin Rhodes	5	0	3+1	0	1+0	0
12	MF	(Austria) AUT	Ante Bajic	9	1	7+0	1	2+0	0
15	DF	(Austria) AUT	Joris Boguo	7	0	0+5	0	0+2	0
17	MF	(Austria) AUT	Philipp Pomer	4	2	2+1	1	1+0	1
18	MF	(Austria) AUT	Fabian Rossdorfer	3	0	0+2	0	0+1	0
19	MF	(Denmark) DEN	Tobias Lund Jensen	7	1	0+5	0	0+2	1
21	FW	(Croatia) CRO	Tino Kusanović	4	0	0+3	0	1+0	0
22	MF	(Austria) AUT	Stefan Schwab	9	3	7+0	2	2+0	1
28	DF	(Faroe Islands) FRO	Samuel Chukwudi	9	2	7+0	1	2+0	1
30	DF	(Germany) GER	Oliver Steurer	9	0	7+0	0	2+0	0
33	DF	(Austria) AUT	Alessandro Goiginger	1	0	0+0	0	1+0	0
38	FW	(Germany) GER	Nermin Mesic	1	0	0+0	0	0+1	0
42	MF	(Austria) AUT	Fabian Lechner	1	0	0+0	0	0+1	0
47	FW	(Austria) AUT	Evan Eghosa Aisowieren	9	5	6+1	2	2+0	3
92	FW	(Sweden) SWE	Isaac Kiese Thelin	1	1	0+1	1	0+0	0
Player(s) who featured but departed the club on loan during the season:
26	MF	(Austria) AUT	Jonas Mayer	3	0	0+2	0	0+1	0
