= 2026–27 Austrian Cup =

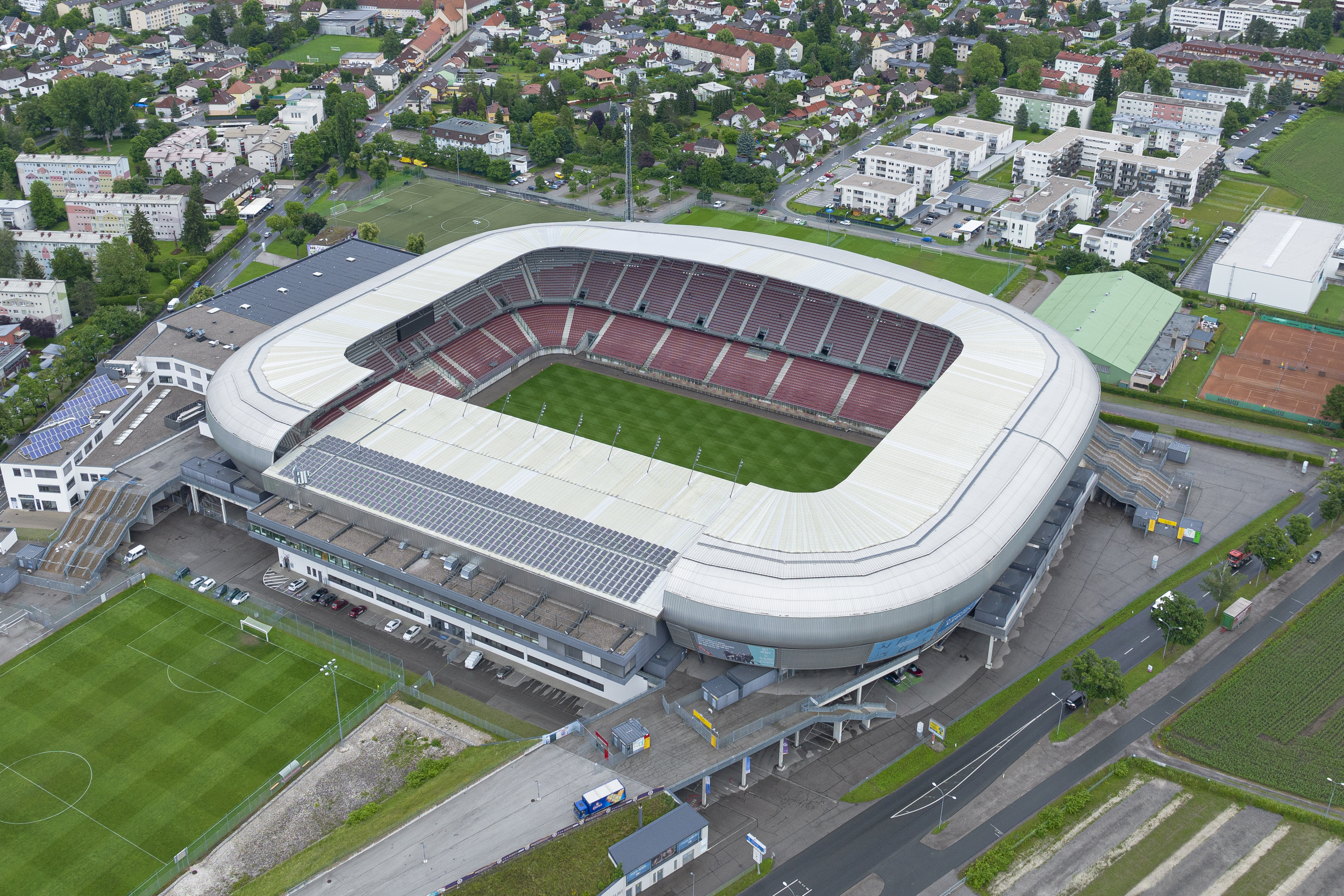
- Wörthersee Stadion will host the final

Tournament details
- Country: Austria
- Teams: 64
- All statistics correct as of 8 July 2026.

The 2026–27 Austrian Cup will be the 96th edition of the national cup in Austrian football. The winners wull qualify for the 2027–28 Europa League Third Qualifying round. LASK are the defending champions, having defeated SCR Altach in the 2026 final, the second cup win for the team based in Linz, who also completed its second cup-championship double since 1965.
Match times up to 25 October 2026 and from 29 March 2027 are CEST (UTC+2). Times on interim ("winter") days are CET (UTC+1).

== Round dates ==
The schedule of the competition is as follows.

Round	Match date
Round 1	24–26 July 2026
Round 2	4–6 September 2026
Round 3	27–29 October 2026
Quarter-finals	9–11 February 2027
Semi-finals	3-5 March 2027
Final	1 May 2027 at Wörthersee Stadion, Klagenfurt

== First round ==
Thirty-two first round matches will be played between 24 July and 26 July 2026. The draw was held on 22 June with the former Austrian footballer Herbert Prohaska acting as the "draw fairy", assisted by Andreas Ivanschitz, also a former Austrian footballer.

Number of teams per tier still in competition
Bundesliga	2. Liga	Regionalliga	Landesliga	No championship (Note: SK Bischofshofen qualified for the cup through its sixth place in Regionalliga West. However, the club was first excluded from the 3rd tier competition, then from all lower competitions in the Salzburg state. Despite its exclusion from regular championships, the club was still allowed to keep its place in the national cup.)	Total
12 / 12	12 / 12	34 / 34	3 / 3	1 / 1	64 / 64

24 July 2026	SC Wieselburg (IV)	0–6	WSG Tirol (I)	Wieselburg
18:30 CEST (UTC+2)		Report	23' Ola-Adebomi; 44', 52', 71' Baden; 61' Bambara; 79' Hinterseer	Stadium: TTI-Arena; Attendance: 1050; Referee: Jan Uwe Thiel

24 July 2026	FC Dornbirn (III)	1–5	SV Ried (I)	Dornbirn
18:30 CEST (UTC+2)	Herbaly 55'	Report	36', 45' Aisowieren; 58' Chukwudi; 72' Malicsek; 90+3' Lund Jensen	Stadium: Birkenwiese; Attendance: 800; Referee: Paul Nisandzic

24 July 2026	ATUS Velden (III)	1–2	SK Austria Klagenfurt (III)	Velden
19:00 CEST (UTC+2)	Zurga 22'	Report	(yellow card) 19' Weiss; 72', (yellow card) 85' Schoppitsch; 75' Ranacher	Stadium: Waldarena; Attendance: 850; Referee: Manfred Krassnitzer

24 July 2026	SV Lafnitz (III)	3–1	USV Scheiblingkirchen - Warth (III)	Lafnitz
19:00 CEST (UTC+2)	Akrap 14', (yellow card) 54'; Maurer 27'; Forobosko (yellow card) 55'; Karakoutis (red card) 90+4'; Carrera (yellow card) 90+6'; Lema 90+7'	Report	(yellow card) 54' Ressler; 79' Kürner	Stadium: Sportplatz Lafnitz; Attendance: 250; Referee: Tobias Unger

24 July 2026	DSC Deutschlandsberg (III)	1–1 (a.e.t.) (3–1 p)	SKU Amstetten (II)	Deutschlandsberg
19:00 CEST (UTC+2)	Fuchshofer 17'; Suppan (yellow card) 89'; Lipp (yellow card) 100'; Hack (yellow card) 112'	Report	(yellow card) 24' (yellow-red card) 65' Offenthaler; 60' Haider; (yellow card) 62' Peham; (yellow card) 120' Vötter	Stadium: Koralmstadion; Attendance: 600; Referee: Christof Leitner
	Penalties
	Fuchshofer (penalty scored); Jelec (penalty scored); Rumpf (penalty missed); Suppan (penalty scored)		(penalty scored) Steiger; (penalty missed) Wimmer; (penalty missed) Vötter; (penalty missed) Deinhofer

24 July 2026	SV Leobendorf (III)	0–1	SCR Altach (I)	Leobendorf
19:00 CEST (UTC+2)	Beljan (yellow card) 41'; Pellegrini (yellow card) 79'	Report	67' Litawumba	Stadium: Sparkassen Stadion Leobendorf; Attendance: 400; Referee: Achim Untergasser

24 July 2026	FC Lauterach (III)	1–5	Wolfsberger AC (I)	Lauterach
19:00 CEST (UTC+2)	Grabic 56'; Yachir (yellow card) 78'	Report	27', 81' Vrioni; 32', 38' Schabauer; (yellow card) 47' Diabaté; 75' Karamoko	Stadium: Bruno Pezzey Stadion; Attendance: 800; Referee: David Astl

24 July 2026	FCM Traiskirchen (III)	4–0	SVG Bleiburg (III)	Traiskirchen
19:30 CEST (UTC+2)	Klar (yellow card) 15'; Schmidt 33', 56'; Felber (yellow card) 37'; Schobesberger 52'; Dellantonio 90+3'	Report	(yellow card) 69' Lippitz; (yellow card) 87' Storman; (yellow card) 89' Kolar	Stadium: ARBÖ-Arena; Attendance: 200; Referee: Stanislav Dyulgerov

24 July 2026	SV Tillmitsch (III)	1–2 (a.e.t.)	SKN St. Pölten (II)	Tillmitsch
19:30 CEST (UTC+2)	Martin (yellow card) 20'; Oswald (yellow card) 23', (goal) 81'; Posch (yellow card) 58'	Report	70' Mané; (yellow card) 95' Skogen; 113' Gabbichler; (red card) 115' Krasniqi	Stadium: Nunner Arena; Attendance: 800; Referee: Christoph Messner

24 July 2026	DSV Leoben (IV)	0–6	ASK Voitsberg (II)	Leoben
19:30 CEST (UTC+2)		Report	3' Polster; 12', 19', 23' Schubert; 29', 62' Goriupp	Stadium: Kartnigs Werbeprofi Arena; Attendance: 400; Referee: Edis Skalic

24 July 2026	SV Horn (III)	1–1 (a.e.t.) (2–4 p)	Floridsdorfer AC (II)	Horn
19:30 CEST (UTC+2)	Dhouib (yellow card) 37'; Budimir 77', (yellow card) 90+3'; Bauer (yellow card) 116'	Report	(yellow card) 40' Vucenovic; 47' Hafenscher	Stadium: Sparkasse Horn Arena; Attendance: 400; Referee: Alexander Harkam
	Penalties
	Dhouib (penalty scored); Trcek (penalty missed); Schuster (penalty missed); Bauer (penalty scored)		(penalty scored) Bitsche; (penalty missed) Schneider; (penalty scored) Piskule; (penalty scored) Abdijanovic; (penalty scored) Becirovic

24 July 2026	Union Gurten (III)	1–3 (a.e.t.)	FC Blau-Weiß Linz (II)	Gurten
19:30 CEST (UTC+2)	Seiwald 15'; Horner (yellow card) 47'	Report	90' Ronivaldo; 101' Collmann; 104' (o.g.) Schnaitter; (yellow card) 116' Conté	Stadium: Park21-Arena; Attendance: 1300; Referee: Maximilian Fischer

24 July 2026	SV Seekirchen (III)	0–3	SK Sturm Graz (I)	Seekirchen
20:30 CEST (UTC+2)	Heuberger (yellow card) 22'; Pär (yellow card) 28'; Leitenstorfer (yellow card) 58'; Freund (yellow card) 73'; Braun (yellow card) 81'	Report	39' Seidl; 49' Fosso; 85' Włodarczyk	Stadium: Sportzentrum Aug; Attendance: 1600; Referee: Markus Greinecker

25 July 2026	SV Wals-Grünau (III)	1–5	SV Austria Salzburg (II)	Wals-Siezenheim
15:30 CEST (UTC+2)	Wildmann 53'; Sabic (yellow card) 59'; Trkulja (yellow card) 81'	Report	40', 62', 90+1' Gebauer; 43' Eder; 83' Lukasser-Weitlaner	Stadium: Hans-Ludwig-Stadion; Attendance: 1500; Referee: Julian Edlinger

25 July 2026	FC Lustenau 07 (III)	1–4	FC Kitzbühel (III)	Lustenau
17:00 CEST (UTC+2)	Karakas (yellow card) 42' (yellow-red card) 42'; Häfele (yellow card) 90'	Report	19' Lauf; 38' (pen.) Redek; 43', 61', (yellow card) 59' Stradins; (yellow card) 82' Baur	Stadium: Stadion an der Holzstraße; Attendance: 750; Referee: Jonas Mayrhofer

25 July 2026	SR Donaufeld (III)	0–4	Grazer AK (I)	Vienna
17:00 CEST (UTC+2)	Petkovic (yellow card) 66'; Ivkic (yellow card) 77'	Report	43' Trummer; (yellow card) 45+2' Oberleitner; 49' Hofleitner; (yellow card) 77' Gragger; 82' Klassen; 90' Michorl	Stadium: Sportplatz Donaufeld; Attendance: 1500; Referee: Stefan Macanovic

25 July 2026	Union Dietach (III)	3–3 (a.e.t.) (5–6 p)	SK Bischofshofen (∅)	Dietach
17:30 CEST (UTC+2)	Laskaj (yellow card) 3'; Reiter 83'; Berisha 86' (pen.); Ketan (yellow card) 96'; Grafinger 103'; P. Schwaiger (yellow card) 120'	Report	(yellow card) 4' Anie; 59', (yellow card) 85' Jouini; 89' Meïté	Stadium: DietachArena; Attendance: 300; Referee: Sascha Koprivnik
	Penalties
	Reiter (penalty missed); V. Schwaiger (penalty scored); Gmainer (penalty scored); Oberbauer (penalty scored); Berisha (penalty missed); Bytyqi (penalty missed); P. Schwaiger (penalty scored); Grafinger (penalty missed); Kühhas (penalty scored); Valentic (penalty missed)		(penalty scored) Laguns; (penalty missed) Jouini; (penalty scored) Diallo; (penalty missed) Ayitu; (penalty scored) Singer; (penalty missed) Meïté; (penalty scored) Asante; (penalty missed) Anie; (penalty scored) Celikovic; (penalty scored) Zitouni

25 July 2026	Wiener Viktoria (III)	1–3	SC/ESV Parndorf (III)	Vienna
18:00 CEST (UTC+2)	Koreimann 18', (yellow card) 78'; Dostal (yellow card) 71'; Dyankof (red card) 87'; Knasmüllner (yellow card) 87'	Report	16' Fofana; (yellow card) 64' Schmelzer; (yellow card) 64' Pointner; 72' Rigo; 82' Ziniel; (yellow card) 83' Schmidt	Stadium: Viktoria-Platz; Attendance: 330; Referee: Tobias Eder

25 July 2026	FC Wacker Innsbruck (II)	3–0	SVG Reichenau (III)	Innsbruck
18:00 CEST (UTC+2)	Lechl 20' (pen.); Rodríguez 44'; Evans 90+3'	Report	(yellow card) 44' Abali; (yellow card) 55' Zangerl; (yellow card) 87' Jovljevic	Stadium: Tivoli Stadion Tirol; Attendance: 2984; Referee: Manuel Baumann

25 July 2026	SPG Bad Leonfelden / Schenkenfelden (III)	0–5	Schwarz-Weiß Bregenz (II)	Bad Leonfelden
18:00 CEST (UTC+2)	Nitriansky (yellow card) 47'; Oberaigner (yellow card) 56'	Report	2' Omotehara; 22' Sealey; 31', 56' (pen.) Fetahu; 81' Zaizen	Stadium: Vortuna Arena; Attendance: 550; Referee: Alexander Autherith

25 July 2026	VfB Hohenems (III)	1–2	FC Hertha Wels (II)	Hohenems
18:00 CEST (UTC+2)	Tripp (yellow card) 36'; Gruber (yellow card) 41'; Ünal 45+2'; Wolfgang (yellow card) 75'; Heimböck (yellow card) 90+5'	Report	12' Kregar; 38' Freund; (yellow card) 57' Gobara; (yellow card) 90+3' Jabbeh; (yellow card) 90+5' Haudum	Stadium: Herrenriedstadion; Attendance: 327; Referee: Manuel Jauk

25 July 2026	SV Oberwart (III)	1–7	FC Red Bull Salzburg (I)	Oberwart
18:00 CEST (UTC+2)	Hutter 35'; Woth (yellow card) 57'; Pauliny (yellow card) 85'	Report	7' Baidoo; 11' Vertessen; 33' (pen.), (yellow card) 41' Diakité; 54' Redžić; 76', 89' Veratschnig; 85' Kitano	Stadium: Informstadion; Attendance: 2500; Referee: Cagri Demir

25 July 2026	SC Kalsdorf (III)	0–7	LASK (I)	Kalsdorf bei Graz
18:00 CEST (UTC+2)	Mate (yellow card) 50'	Report	39', (yellow card) 67' Andrade; 53', 61', 79' (pen.), 90+2' Lang; 69' Adeniran; 90' Daněk	Stadium: Sportzentrum Kalsdorf; Attendance: 1200; Referee: Philip Gadler

25 July 2026	SPG Kremser SC / Getzersdorf KM (III)	0–1	SC Austria Lustenau (I)	Krems an der Donau
18:30 CEST (UTC+2)	Temper (yellow card) 51'; Neumayer (yellow card) 90+3'	Report	(yellow card) 48' Maak; 63' Benjamin; (yellow card) 78' Verinac	Stadium: Sepp-Doll-Stadion; Attendance: 1500; Referee: Julian Schnur

25 July 2026	SK Vorwärts Steyr (III)	1–0	SV Kuchl (III)	Steyr
19:00 CEST (UTC+2)	Pasic (yellow card) 75'; Kolm 90+3'	Report	(yellow card) 86' Salchegger; (yellow card) 90+5' Bachleitner	Stadium: Vorwärts Stadion; Attendance: 1287; Referee: Martin Wangg

25 July 2026	SK Treibach (III)	1–4	Kapfenberger SV (II)	Althofen
19:00 CEST (UTC+2)	Tialler (yellow card) 35'; Ristic (yellow card) 65'; Kmetic 66', (yellow card) 86'; Höfferer (yellow card) 88'	Report	21' Stauder; 41' Rostaș; 60' Žlibanović; (yellow card) 64' Weissenbacher; (yellow card) 65' Čolić; (yellow card) 75' Pranjković; 76' Šokčević	Stadium: Turnerwald-Stadion; Attendance: 500; Referee: Philip Gillesberger

25 July 2026	Mattersburger SV 2020 (III)	1–2	First Vienna FC (II)	Mattersburg
19:00 CEST (UTC+2)	Haring (yellow card) 24'; Halper 80'; Leitgeb (yellow card) 85'	Report	40', 45+1' Fillafer; (yellow card) 56' Nagele; (yellow card) 90' Monschein	Stadium: Pappelstadion; Attendance: 1280; Referee: Tobias Wimhofer

26 July 2026	SC Schwaz (III)	2–3	SPG Wallern / St. Marienkirchen (III)	Schwaz
17:00 CEST (UTC+2)	Hupfauf 15'; Alak (yellow card) 43'; Ali Sahin 90+3'; Plattner (yellow card) 90+4'	Report	(yellow card) 17' Haas; (yellow card) 21' Affenzeller; 39', 47' Wild; (yellow card) 41' Huber; 44' (pen.) Kvesa	Stadium: Silberstadt Arena; Attendance: 303; Referee: Armin Talic

26 July 2026	SC Imst (III)	1–3	TSV Hartberg (I)	Imst
17:00 CEST (UTC+2)	Steinlechner (yellow card) 21'; Marberger (yellow card) 25'; Lamp (yellow card) 38'; Demir 43'	Report	12' Markuš; 23' Hoffmann; (yellow card) 83' Diarra; 90+1', (yellow card) 90+3' Drew	Stadium: Velly Arena; Attendance: 500; Referee: Samuel Sampl

26 July 2026	SV Leithaprodersdorf (IV)	2–1	Admira Wacker (II)	Leithaprodersdorf
18:00 CEST (UTC+2)	Markhardt 20', (yellow card) 66'; Beran 33'; Mihalits (yellow card) 49'; Koch (yellow card) 69'; Haring (yellow card) 78'; Kustor (yellow card) 85'	Report	(yellow card) 52' Weberbauer; 58' Steiner; (yellow card) 66' Gemicibaşi; (yellow card) 90+6' Olsa	Stadium: LeithArena; Attendance: 1200; Referee: Harun Suta

26 July 2026	Wiener Sport-Club (III)	0–5	FK Austria Wien (I)	Vienna
18:00 CEST (UTC+2)	Radulovic (yellow card) 45'	Report	2', 56', 58' Eggestein; (yellow card) 43' Ranftl; 50' Šaljić; 75' Deshishku	Stadium: Wiener Sport-Club Platz; Attendance: 5617; Referee: Emil Ristoskov

26 July 2026	SV Wienerberg (III)	0–3	SK Rapid Wien (I)	Vienna
20:30 CEST (UTC+2)		Report	45', 54' Adamsen; 65' Haïdara	Stadium: Wienerberg Arena; Attendance: 1500; Referee: Davor Divkovic

== Second round ==
Sixteen second round matches were played between 1 September and 3 September 2026.

Number of teams per tier still in competition
Bundesliga	2. Liga	Regionalliga	Landesliga	No championship	Total
12 / 12	10 / 12	8 / 36	1 / 3	1 / 1	32 / 64

4 September 2026	Kapfenberger SV (II)	0–1	FC Hertha Wels (II)	Kapfenberg
18:30 CEST (UTC+2)		Report	53', (yellow card) 90' Sahin; (yellow card) 68' Feyrer; (yellow card) 70' Keckeisen; (yellow card) 82' Wernitznig; (yellow card) 89' Freund	Stadium: Franz Fekete Stadium; Attendance: 421; Referee: Emil Ristoskov

4 September 2026	SCR Altach (I)	7–0	SK Bischofshofen (∅)	Altach
18:30 CEST (UTC+2)	Massombo 9'; Jäger 26'; Diawara 27', 45'; Böckle 40'; Hrstić 56'; Elongo-Yombo 78'	Report	(yellow card) 37' Celiković	Stadium: Stadion Schnabelholz; Attendance: 2,819; Referee: Stefan Macanovic

4 September 2026	SPG Wallern / St. Marienkirchen (III)	1–5	SV Ried (I)	Wallern an der Trattnach
19:00 CEST (UTC+2)	Music 78'	Report	16' Aisowieren; 34' (o.g.) Straif; 35' Rasner; 38' Pomer; 57' Schwab; (yellow card) 86' Kusanović	Stadium: Sportanlage Wallern; Attendance: 1,403; Referee: Samuel Esempio

4 September 2026	Floridsdorfer AC (II)	0–0 (a.e.t.) (4–5 p)	Schwarz-Weiß Bregenz (II)	Vienna
19:00 CEST (UTC+2)	Glavan (yellow card) 99'; Bitsche (yellow card) 104'; Lerchbacher (yellow card) 114'	Report	(yellow card) 20' Shima; (yellow card) 63' Araki; (yellow card) 70' Rodrigues; (yellow card) 72' Fetahu; (yellow card) 73' Cecchini; (yellow card) 77' Torelli; (yellow card) 97' Sealey	Stadium: FAC-Platz; Attendance: 663; Referee: Markus Greinecker
	Penalties
	Piskule (penalty scored); Brandl (penalty scored); Glavan (penalty missed); Kirnbauer (penalty scored); Bitsche (penalty scored); Hafenscher (penalty missed)		(penalty scored) Gabryel; (penalty scored) Maksimovic; (penalty scored) Glavan; (penalty scored) Dantas; (penalty missed) Rodrigues; (penalty scored) Omotehara; (yellow card) PSO Dantas

5 September 2026	SV Lafnitz (III)	2–6	SC Austria Lustenau (I)	Lafnitz
14:30 CEST (UTC+2)	Akrap 7', (yellow card) 35'; Lema 32'	Report	2' Weixelbraun; 39' Jastremski; 71' Verinac; 74' Benjamin; 85' (o.g.) Bradaric; 88' Ismailcebioglu	Stadium: Sportplatz Lafnitz; Attendance: 250; Referee: Josef Spurny

5 September 2026	DSC Deutschlandsberg (III)	1–6	LASK (I)	Deutschlandsberg
15:30 CEST (UTC+2)	Degen 48'	Report	10' Lang; 15', 55' Kane; 22' Daněk; 36' Flecker; 67' Horvath; (yellow card) 72' Verhaeghe	Stadium: Koralmstadion; Attendance: 2,500; Referee: Davor Divkovic

5 September 2026	ASK Voitsberg (II)	1–4	SK Sturm Graz (I)	Voitsberg
15:30 CEST (UTC+2)	Scheucher (yellow card) 28'; Neubauer 83'; Schriebl (yellow card) 84'; Zivanovic (yellow card) 86'	Report	15' Weiper; (yellow card) 43' Malić; (yellow card) 47' Gorenc Stanković; 66' Seidl; 70' Mamageishvili; 87' Kiteishvili	Stadium: Münzer Bioindustrie Sportpark; Attendance: 3,650; Referee: Isa Simsek

5 September 2026	FC Blau-Weiß Linz (II)	2–3	FC Wacker Innsbruck (II)	Linz
15:30 CEST (UTC+2)	Kreiker 6'; Vučić 20'	Report	(yellow card) 56' Kopp; 73' Guermouche; 77' Gstrein; 86' Tekir; (yellow card) 88' Owusu	Stadium: Hofmann Personal Stadion; Attendance: 4,666; Referee: Sebastian Gishamer

5 September 2026	SV Austria Salzburg (II)	0–4	First Vienna FC (II)	Salzburg
16:30 CEST (UTC+2)	Spitali (yellow card) 18'; Radojević (yellow card) 16'; Markhardt (yellow card) 56'	Report	30' Marte; (yellow card) 41' Jung In-gyom; (yellow card) 49' Breit; 55' Ungar; 69' Anselm; (yellow card) 87' Prohart; 90+1' Zimmermann	Stadium: Max-Aicher-Stadion; Attendance: 1,566; Referee: Julian Schnur

5 September 2026	SV Leithaprodersdorf (IV)	0–4	WSG Tirol (I)	Leithaprodersdorf
17:00 CEST (UTC+2)	Koch (yellow card) 14'; Radojević (yellow card) 16'; Markhardt (yellow card) 56'	Report	12', 32' Wels; (yellow card) 29' Taferner; (yellow card) 39' Kubatta; (yellow card) 42', (red card) 72' Gschösser; 52' Olakigbe; 87' Baden Frederiksen	Stadium: LeithArena; Attendance: 1,612; Referee: Philip Gadler

5 September 2026	FCM Traiskirchen (III)	0–6	FK Austria Wien (I)	Traiskirchen
17:30 CEST (UTC+2)	Felber (yellow card) 10'; Klar (yellow card) 53'; Pfaffl (yellow card) 64'	Report	22' Deshishku; 29', 30', 90+3' Eggestein; (yellow card) 39' Kubatta; 39' Nnodim; (yellow card) 43' Maybach; (yellow card) 58' Ranftl; 90+1' Hettwer	Stadium: ARBÖ-Arena; Attendance: 3,500; Referee: Achim Untergasser

5 September 2026	SK Austria Klagenfurt (III)	2–5	SK Rapid Wien (I)	Klagenfurt
20:30 CEST (UTC+2)	Kasnik (yellow card) 18'; Schoppitsch 34', 46'; Kuttin (yellow card) 57'	Report	28' Seidl; 40', 57', 69' Wurmbrand; 62' Bajlicz	Stadium: Wörthersee Stadion; Attendance: 3,350; Referee: Florian Jäger

6 September 2026	FC Kitzbühel (III)	0–2	Grazer AK (I)	Kitzbühel
16:00 CEST (UTC+2)	Markelic (yellow card) 50'; Madersbacher (yellow card) 73'	Report	3' Hofleitner; 77' Oberleitner	Stadium: Sportstadion Kitzbühel Langau; Attendance: 800; Referee: Stjepan Bosnjak

6 September 2026	SKN St. Pölten (II)	0–3	FC Red Bull Salzburg (I)	St. Pölten
17:00 CEST (UTC+2)	Mané (yellow card) 53'	Report	22' Tabaković; 31' Camara; 50' Mazurek	Stadium: NV Arena; Attendance: 3,894; Referee: Alain Sadikovski

6 September 2026	SK Vorwärts Steyr (III)	0–4	TSV Hartberg (I)	Steyr
17:00 CEST (UTC+2)	Martic (yellow card) 73'	Report	15' Kainz; 17' Gattermayer; 30' Hoffmann; 41' Dalpiaz; (yellow card) 82' Feldhofer	Stadium: Vorwärts Stadion; Attendance: 2,000; Referee: Daniel Pfister

6 September 2026	SC/ESV Parndorf (III)	2–2 (a.e.t.) (4–5 p)	Wolfsberger AC (I)	Parndorf
17:00 CEST (UTC+2)	Szabo (yellow card) 50', (goal) 90+1'; Bucur (yellow card) 90+3'; Fofana (yellow card) 94'; Lamster (yellow card) 101'; Ziniel 107', (yellow card) 120'; Schmelzer (yellow card) 110'	Report	(yellow card) 33' Schriebl; (yellow card) 68' (yellow-red card) 92' Mamageishvili; 79' Pink; 96' Hassler	Stadium: Heidebodenstadion Parndorf; Attendance: 1,000; Referee: Manuel Baumann
	Penalties
	Bucur (penalty missed); Szabo (penalty scored); Rigo (penalty scored); Dornhackl (penalty scored); Schmelzer (penalty scored); Schmidt (penalty missed)		(penalty missed) Wohlmuth; (penalty scored) Sulzner; (penalty scored) Hassler; (penalty scored) Schwarz; (penalty scored) Verhounig; (penalty scored) Schabauer

== Third round ==
Eight third round matches will be played between 27 October and 29 October 2026.

Number of teams per tier still in competition
Bundesliga	2. Liga	Regionalliga	Landesliga	No championship	Total
12 / 12	4 / 12	0 / 36	0 / 3	0 / 1	16 / 64

27 October 2026	First Vienna FC (II)	0–3	SK Rapid Wien (I)	Vienna
18:00 CEST (UTC+1)	Luxbacher (yellow card) 38'	Report	18' Demir; (yellow card) 59' Tilio; 69', 86' Mbuyi	Stadium: Hohe Warte Stadium; Attendance: 6,168; Referee: Christian-Petru Ciochircă

27 October 2026	FK Austria Wien (I)	1–1 (a.e.t.) (3–5 p)	TSV Hartberg (I)	Vienna
18:00 CEST (UTC+1)	Eggestein 26'; Fischer (yellow card) 30'; Buhari (yellow card) 35'; Boateng (yellow card) 111'	Report	44' Lukić; (yellow card) 67' Coulibaly; (yellow card) 90+3' Diarra; (yellow card) 92' Spendlhofer; (yellow card) 95' Dalpiaz	Stadium: Generali Arena; Attendance: 11,355; Referee: Harald Lechner
	Penalties
	Wustinger (penalty scored); Müller (penalty missed); Nnodim (penalty scored); Lee (penalty scored)		(penalty scored) Markuš; (penalty scored) Karner; (penalty scored) Urrutia; (penalty scored) Diarra; (penalty scored) Spendlhofer

27 October 2026	FC Hertha Wels (II)	1–0	Wolfsberger AC (I)	Wels
18:30 CEST (UTC+1)	Sahin 4'; Drammeh (yellow card) 60'	Report	(yellow card) 70' Sulzner; (yellow card) 88' Wohlmuth; (yellow card) 90+3' Fitz; (yellow card) 90+4' Vrioni	Stadium: eww Stadion; Attendance: 469; Referee: Daniel Pfister

27 October 2026	Grazer AK (I)	0–4	SCR Altach (I)	Graz
19:00 CEST (UTC+1)		Report	18', 51' Massombo; 58' Elongo-Yombo; 69' Hrstić	Stadium: Liebenauer Stadium; Attendance: 3,533; Referee: Florian Jäger

28 October 2026	FC Wacker Innsbruck (II)	2–2 (a.e.t.) (3–4 p)	WSG Tirol (I)	Innsbruck
18:00 CEST (UTC+1)	Gstrein 16'; Biancheri 116'	Report	5' Bulic; (yellow card) 90+1' Boras; (yellow card) 105+1' Taferner; 110' Sabitzer	Stadium: Tivoli Stadion Tirol; Attendance: 16071; Referee: Sebastian Gishamer
	Penalties
	Wibowo (penalty missed); Kunze (penalty scored); Biancheri (penalty scored); Gallé (penalty missed); Yilmaz (penalty scored); Owusu (penalty missed); Weinzierl (penalty scored)		(penalty scored) Sabitzer; (penalty missed) Wels; (penalty missed) Goiginger; (penalty scored) Boras; (penalty scored) Satin; (penalty missed) Kubatta; (penalty scored) Oswald

28 October 2026	Schwarz-Weiß Bregenz (II)	2–3	FC Red Bull Salzburg (I)	Bregenz
18:00 CEST (UTC+1)	Omotehara 33'; Zaizen (yellow card) 44'; Cecchini 59'; Gabryel (yellow card) 62'	Report	2' Konaté; 43' Vertessen; (yellow card) 47' Diakité; 56' Lainer; (yellow card) 90+5' Tabaković	Stadium: ImmoAgentur Stadion; Attendance: 1600; Referee: Achim Untergasser

28 October 2026	LASK (I)	5–4 (a.e.t.)	SV Ried (I)	Linz
20:30 CEST (UTC+1)	Alemão 51'; Ljubičić 84'; Adeniran (yellow card) 89', (goal) 120'; Mbuyamba 90+2'; Usor 111', (yellow card) 112'; Danek (yellow card) 117'; Flecker (yellow card) 117'	Report	37', 76' Maart; 47' Kiese Thelin; (yellow card) 117' Malicsek; (yellow card) 117', (goal) 120+1' Pomer	Stadium: Raiffeisen Arena; Attendance: 13901; Referee: Jakob Semler

29 October 2026	SC Austria Lustenau (I)	3–2	SK Sturm Graz (I)	Lustenau
18:00 CEST (UTC+1)	Jastremski 16', 65', (yellow card) 54'; Weixelbraun 26'; Grabher (yellow card) 33'; Diarra (yellow card) 76'; Maak (yellow card) 86'	Report	35', (yellow card) 56' Petrović; (yellow card) 51' Matoshi; (yellow card) 58' Balbo; (yellow card) 67' Quarshie; 80' Seidl; (yellow card) 90+3' Diakité	Stadium: Sun Minimeal Arena; Referee: Arnes Talic

== Quarter-finals ==
Four Quarter-final matches will be played between 29 January and 31 January 2026.

Number of teams per tier still in competition
Bundesliga	2. Liga	Regionalliga	Landesliga	No championship	Total
7 / 12	1 / 12	0 / 36	0 / 3	0 / 1	8 / 64

== See also ==
- 2026–27 Austrian Football Bundesliga
- 2026–27 Austrian Football Second League
