= 2026–27 SC Austria Lustenau season =

SC Austria Lustenau
2026–27 season
- Manager: Markus Mader
- Stadium: Reichshofstadion
- Austrian Football Bundesliga: 10th
- Austrian Cup: Fourth round
- Top goalscorer: League: Dominik Weixelbraun (6); All: Dominik Weixelbraun (8)
- Highest home attendance: 5,198 (vs. SCR Altach, 19 September 2026)
- Lowest home attendance: 3,115 (vs. Sturm Graz, 29 October 2026)
- Average home league attendance: 4,313
- Biggest win: 6–2 (vs. SV Lafnitz, 5 September 2026)
- Biggest defeat: 4–0 (vs. WSG Tirol, 28 August 2026) (vs. LASK, 17 October 2026); 5–1 (vs. Rapid Wien, 24 October 2026) (vs. Red Bull Salzburg, 1 November 2026)
- All statistics correct as of 17 October 2026.

The 2026–27 season is the 113th season in the history of SC Austria Lustenau, and the club's first season in the Austrian Football Bundesliga since 2023–24. In addition to the domestic league, the team is scheduled to participate in the Austrian Cup.

== Transfers ==
=== In ===
Pos.	Player	Transferred from	Fee	Date	Source
FW	(Austria) Albin Gashi	(Austria) Hertha Wels	Free	20 May 2026	
MF	(Ghana) Lord Afrifa	(Austria) Sturm Graz II	Free	5 June 2026	
DF	(Austria) Niklas Pertlwieser	(Austria) SKU Amstetten	Undisclosed	10 June 2026	
MF	(Switzerland) Dion Kacuri	(Switzerland) FC Basel	Loan	11 June 2026	
DF	(Brazil) Danilo Soares	(Germany) 1. FC Nürnberg	Free	12 June 2026	
DF	(Nigeria) Emmanuel Chukwu	(Germany) TSG Hoffenheim	Loan	15 June 2026	
DF	(Austria) Novak Rajic	(Austria) AKA Vorarlberg	Undisclosed	15 June 2026	
FW	(Austria) Dominik Weixelbraun	(Austria) SK Rapid Wien	Loan	18 June 2026	
FW	(Nigeria) Precious Benjamin	(Germany) TSG Hoffenheim	Loan	30 June 2026	
FW	(Germany) Antonio Verinac	(Switzerland) FC St. Gallen	Loan	22 July 2026	
DF	(Brazil) Anílson	(Portugal) Paços de Ferreira	Undisclosed	19 August 2026	
FW	(The Gambia) Alieu Conateh	(Switzerland) Grasshopper Club Zurich	Loan	3 September 2026	

=== Out ===
Pos.	Player	Transferred to	Fee	Date	Source
FW	(Austria) Mario Vucenovic	(Austria) FAC	Free	9 June 2026	
DF	(Brazil) Willian Rodrigues	(Austria) SW Bregenz	Free	1 July 2026	
DF	(Liechtenstein) Felix Oberwaditzer	(Austria) FC Lauterach	Free	1 July 2026	
FW	(Zambia) Jack Lahne		Released	1 July 2026	
MF	(Germany) Nico Gorzel		Released	1 July 2026	
GK	(Germany) Hugo Bauer		Released	1 July 2026	
MF	(Senegal) Mame Wade	(Belgium) La Louvière	€500k	2 July 2026	
FW	(Austria) Daniel Au Yeong	(Austria) SW Bregenz	Free	9 July 2026	
DF	(France) Axel Rouquette	(France) US Créteil	Free	10 July 2026	
FW	(Portugal) Asumah Abubakar	(Azerbaijan) Kapaz	Free	25 July 2026	
MF	(Turkey) Enes Koç	(Turkey) Bodrumspor	Free	9 August 2026	
FW	(Ivory Coast) Ibrahim Ouattara		Released	11 August 2026	

== Friendlies ==
26 June 2026 Friendly	Austria Lustenau	2–0	FC Wil
09:30	Ismailcebioglu 41'; Diarra 90'	Report

1 July 2026 Friendly	Austria Lustenau	0–0	Young Boys
13:00	Ibertsberger (yellow card) 84'	Report

4 July 2026 Friendly	FC Vaduz	1–0	Austria Lustenau
12:45	Dalipi 27'	Report

4 July 2026 Friendly	FC St. Gallen	0–1	Austria Lustenau
13:45		Report

10 July 2026 Friendly	Austria Lustenau	1–0	FC Aarau
16:00	(yellow card) 52'; 54'	Report

15 July 2026 Friendly	SW Bregenz	1–1	Austria Lustenau
09:30	Maksimović 89'	Report	Jastremski 37'

16 July 2026 Friendly	1. FC Nürnberg II	1–0	Austria Lustenau
15:00	Fuchs 56'	Report

== Competitions ==
=== Overall record ===
Competition	First match	Last match	Starting round	Record							
Competition	First match	Last match	Starting round	Pld	W	D	L	GF	GA	GD	Win %
Austrian Football Bundesliga	2 August 2026		Matchday 1	11	2	2	7	13	29	−16	18.18
Austrian Cup	25 July 2026		First round	3	3	0	0	10	4	+6	100.00
Total				14	5	2	7	23	33	−10	35.71

Last updated: 1 November 2026
Source: Soccerway

=== Austrian Football Bundesliga ===
==== League table ====
Pos	Team	Pld	W	D	L	GF	GA	GD	Pts	Qualification
6	SV Ried	12	4	4	4	21	22	−1	16	Qualification for the Championship round
7	WSG Tirol	12	3	4	5	15	18	−3	13	Qualification for the Relegation round
8	Austria Lustenau	12	3	2	7	15	30	−15	11	Qualification for the Relegation round
9	Grazer AK	12	2	4	6	9	29	−20	10	Qualification for the Relegation round
10	SCR Altach	12	3	1	8	11	20	−9	10	Qualification for the Relegation round

Updated to match(es) played on 8 November 2026. Source: Austrian Football Bundesliga
Rules for classification: 1) Points; 2) Head-to-head record; 3) Goal difference; 4) Goals scored; 5) Matches won; 6) Away matches won; 7) Away goals scored.

==== Results summary ====
Overall								Home						Away					
Pld	W	D	L	GF	GA	GD	Pts	W	D	L	GF	GA	GD	W	D	L	GF	GA	GD
11	2	2	7	13	29	−16	8	2	1	2	5	10	−5	0	1	5	8	19	−11

Last updated: 1 November 2026.
Source: ADMIRAL Bundesliga

==== Results by round ====
Round	1	2	3	4	5	6	7	8	9	10	11
Ground	H	A	H	A	H	A	H	A	H	A	A
Result	D	L	W	D	L	L	W	L	L	L	L
Position	8	9	5	7	7	9	9	9	9	10	10

Updated to match(es) played on 1 November 2026. Source: ADMIRAL Bundesliga
A = Away; H = Home; W = Win; D = Draw; L = Loss

==== Matches ====
2 August 2026 1	Austria Lustenau	1–1	SV Ried	Lustenau
17:00	Weixelbraun 26'; Soares (yellow card) 45+2'; Diarra (yellow card) 79'	Report	Nasrawe 33'; Rossdorfer (yellow card) 77'; Jensen (yellow card) 83'	Stadium: Reichshofstadion; Attendance: 4,178; Referee: Harald Lechner

8 August 2026 2	Grazer AK	2–1	Austria Lustenau	Graz
17:00	Pines 18'; Michorl (yellow card) 21'; Hofleitner 66'	Report	Kacuri 51'; Verinac (yellow card) 88'; Chukwu (yellow card) 90+2'	Stadium: Liebenauer Stadium; Attendance: 6,767; Referee: Safak Barmaksiz

15 August 2026 3	Austria Lustenau	2–1	Wolfsberger AC	Lustenau
17:00	Verinac 23', 32'; Jastremski (yellow card) 83'; Gmeiner (yellow card) 90+3'	Report	Schabauer (yellow card) 40'; Vrioni 45+4'	Stadium: Reichshofstadion; Attendance: 3,907; Referee: Jakob Semler

22 August 2026 4	SK Sturm Graz	1–1	Austria Lustenau	Graz
19:30	Jatta 65' (pen.); Weiper (yellow card) 66'; Mamageishvili (yellow card) 90+2'; Gorenc Stanković (yellow card) 90+2'	Report	Weixelbraun 10'; Afrifa (yellow card) 53'; Gmeiner (yellow card) 73'; Ismailcebioglu (yellow card) 90+5'; Schierl (red card) 90+8'	Stadium: Liebenauer Stadium; Attendance: 14,512; Referee: Julian Weinberger

28 August 2026 5	Austria Lustenau	0–4	WSG Tirol	Lustenau
19:30	Verinac (yellow card) 46'; Böhm (yellow card) 66'	Report	Olakigbe 42'; Baden 52', 68' (pen.); Striednig 60'; Oswald (yellow card) 69'	Stadium: Reichshofstadion; Attendance: 4,219; Referee: Manuel Baumann

13 September 2026 6	Austria Wien	2–1	Austria Lustenau	Wien
14:30	Hettwer 82'; Boateng 90+2'	Report	Weixelbraun 46'; Pertlwieser (yellow card) 86'	Stadium: Generali-Arena; Attendance: 11,990; Referee: Christian-Petru Ciochirca

19 September 2026 7	Austria Lustenau	2–0	SCR Altach	Lustenau
17:00	Anílson (yellow card) 7'; Afrifa (yellow card) 31'; Verinac 36'; Weixelbraun 45+1'; Delaye (yellow card) 70'; Diarra (yellow card) 84'	Report	Stojanović (yellow card) 84'	Stadium: Reichshofstadion; Attendance: 5,198; Referee: Stefan Ebner

11 October 2026 8	TSV Hartberg	4–3	Austria Lustenau	Hartberg
14:30	Hoffmann 8', 55', 86'; Feldhofer 60'	Report	Gashi 11'; Weixelbraun 43', 90+3'; Grabher (yellow card) 72'	Stadium: Profertil Arena Hartberg; Attendance: 3,047; Referee: Markus Greinecker

17 October 2026 9	Austria Lustenau	0–4	LASK	Lustenau
17:00 CEST	Soares (yellow card) 16'	Report	Kalajdžić 56'; Flecker (yellow card) 57'; Adeniran 64'; Lang 88', 90+4'	Stadium: Reichshofstadion; Attendance: 4,061; Referee: Emil Ristoskov

24 October 2026 10	Rapid Wien	5–1	Austria Lustenau	Wien
19:30	Kara 7'; Cvetković 9'; Demir 41' (pen.), 67'; Tilio 85'	Report	Voisine (yellow card) 34'; Soares (yellow card) 40'; Gashi (yellow card) 45'; Ismailcebioglu 60'	Stadium: Allianz Stadion; Attendance: 21,379; Referee: Walter Altmann

1 November 2026 11	Red Bull Salzburg	5–1	Austria Lustenau	Wals-Siezenheim
14:30	Barry (yellow card) 5', (goal) 82'; Vertessen (yellow card) 10', (goal) 12'; Krätzig 27'; Drexler 35'; Voisine 68' (o.g.)	Report	Kacuri (yellow card) 51'; Gashi 90+1'	Stadium: Red Bull Arena; Attendance: 5,113; Referee: Julian Weinberger

=== Austrian Cup ===
25 July 2026 First round	SPG Krems/Getzersdorf	0–1	Austria Lustenau	Krems an der Donau
18:30	Temper (yellow card) 51'; Neumayer (yellow card) 90+3'	Report	Maak (yellow card) 48'; Benjamin 63'; Verinac (yellow card) 78'	Stadium: Sepp-Doll-Stadion; Attendance: 1,500; Referee: Julian Schnur

5 September 2026 Second round	SV Lafnitz	2–6	Austria Lustenau	Lafnitz
14:30	Akrap 7', (yellow card) 35'; Lema 32'	Report	Weixelbraun 2'; Jastremski 39'; Verinac 71'; Benjamin 74'; Bradarić 85' (o.g.); Ismailcebioglu 88'	Stadium: Sportplatz Lafnitz; Attendance: 250; Referee: Josef Spurny

29 October 2026 Third round	Austria Lustenau	3–2	Sturm Graz	Lustenau
18:00	Jastremski 16', 65', (yellow card) 54'; Weixelbraun 26'; Grabher (yellow card) 34'; Diarra (yellow card) 76'; Maak (yellow card) 86'	Report	Balbo 35', (yellow card) 58'; Matoshi (yellow card) 51'; Petrović (yellow card) 56'; Quarshie (yellow card) 68'; Seidl 80'; Diakité (yellow card) 90+2'	Stadium: Reichshofstadion; Attendance: 3,115; Referee: Arnes Talic

9 February 2027 Fourth round	TSV Hartberg	v	Austria Lustenau	Hartberg
TBC		Report		Stadium: Profertil Arena Hartberg

== Statistics ==
=== Appearances and goals ===
As of match played 1 November 2026

Players with no appearances are not included on the list
Italics indicate a loaned in player

No.	Pos	Nat	Player	Total		Bundesliga		Austrian Cup	
No.	Pos	Nat	Player	Apps	Goals	Apps	Goals	Apps	Goals
3	DF	(Brazil) BRA	Danilo Soares	13	0	11+0	0	2+0	0
7	DF	(Austria) AUT	Fabian Gmeiner	12	0	8+1	0	2+1	0
8	MF	(Switzerland) SUI	Dion Kacuri	12	1	9+1	1	1+1	0
9	FW	(Germany) GER	Lenn Jastremski	12	3	1+9	0	2+0	3
10	FW	(The Gambia) GAM	Alieu Conateh	5	0	1+3	0	0+1	0
11	FW	(Austria) AUT	Dominik Weixelbraun	14	8	11+0	6	3+0	2
14	FW	(Nigeria) NGR	Precious Benjamin	11	2	2+6	0	2+1	2
15	DF	(Nigeria) NGR	Emmanuel Chukwu	7	0	4+3	0	0+0	0
17	FW	(Austria) AUT	Albin Gashi	12	2	7+3	2	1+1	0
18	DF	(France) FRA	Robin Voisine	7	0	4+2	0	1+0	0
19	MF	(France) FRA	Sacha Delaye	9	0	3+4	0	2+0	0
20	MF	(Ghana) GHA	Lord Afrifa	13	0	10+0	0	1+2	0
21	DF	(Brazil) BRA	Anílson	7	0	3+3	0	1+0	0
23	MF	(Austria) AUT	Pius Grabher	10	0	2+6	0	2+0	0
24	FW	(Mali) MLI	Seydou Diarra	14	0	10+1	0	3+0	0
26	DF	(Austria) AUT	Lukas Ibertsberger	6	0	0+3	0	1+2	0
27	GK	(Austria) AUT	Domenik Schierl	11	0	10+0	0	1+0	0
29	DF	(Austria) AUT	Niklas Pertlwieser	13	0	11+0	0	2+0	0
30	GK	(Germany) GER	Philipp Böhm	3	0	1+0	0	2+0	0
31	DF	(Austria) AUT	Matthias Maak	11	0	4+4	0	3+0	0
39	FW	(Germany) GER	Antonio Verinac	13	4	8+3	3	0+2	1
54	FW	(Austria) AUT	Melih Akbulut	1	0	0+0	0	0+1	0
61	FW	(Austria) AUT	Haris Ismailcebioglu	5	2	1+2	1	1+1	1
Player(s) who featured but departed the club permanently during the season:
10	FW	(Ivory Coast) CIV	Ibrahim Ouattara	1	0	0+0	0	0+1	0
