= 2026–27 Austrian Football Second League =

53rd season of the Austrian second-level football league

Austrian Football Second League
- Season: 2026–27
- Dates: 31 July 2026 - 23 May 2027
- Top goalscorer: 4 players (4)
- Biggest home win: Wacker Innsbruck 5–0 SW Bregenz (31 July 2026)
- Biggest away win: Kapfenberg 0–4 Liefering (31 July 2026)
- Longest winning run: Blau-Weiß Linz; First Vienna (4)
- Longest unbeaten run: First Vienna (5)
- Longest winless run: Hertha Wels (5)
- Longest losing run: Kapfenberger SV; SKN St. Pölten; Rapid Wien II (4)
- All statistics correct as of 20 September 2026.

The 2026–27 Austrian Football Second League, also known as the Admiral 2nd League for sponsorship purposes, is the 53rd season of the Austrian second-level football league and the ninth as the Second League. The league consists of 16 teams.

== Teams ==
Sixteen teams are participating in the 2026–27 season. FC Blau-Weiß Linz was relegated from the Bundesliga in 2025–26 season, replacing last year's 2nd League champion SC Austria Lustenau. Moving up from the lower divisions are ASK Voitsberg, promoted from the Austrian Regionalliga Central and Wacker Innsbruck, promoted from the Austrian Regionalliga West. No team was promoted from the Austrian Regionalliga East.

ASK Voitsberg, Blau-Weiß Linz and Wacker Innsbruck return to the second tier after one, four and five years absence, respectively.

Austria Klagenfurt were relegated to the third tier following an insolvency application and multiple financial violations.

Location of teams in the 2026–27 Austrian Football Second League

Club Name	City	Stadium	Capacity
Admira Wacker	Maria Enzersdorf	Datenpol Arena	10,600
SKU Ertl Glas Amstetten	Amstetten	Ertl Glas Stadion	2,000
SV Austria Salzburg	Salzburg	Max Aicher Stadion	1,566
Austria Wien II	Vienna	Generali Arena	17,500
FC Blau-Weiß Linz	Linz	Hofmann Personal Stadion	5,000
Schwarz-Weiß Bregenz	Bregenz	ImmoAgentur Stadion	12,000
First Vienna FC 1894	Vienna	Hohe Warte Stadium	5,500
FAC WIEN	Vienna	FAC-Platz	3,000
KSV 1919	Kapfenberg	Franz Fekete Stadium	10,000
FC Liefering	Salzburg	Untersberg-Arena	4,128
SK Rapid II	Vienna	Allianz Stadion	28,345
Sturm Graz II	Graz	Merkur Arena	16,364
SKN St. Pölten	Sankt Pölten	NV Arena	8,000
ASK Voitsberg	Voitsberg	Münzer Bioindustrie Sportpark	2,500
FC Wacker Innsbruck	Innsbruck	Tivoli Stadion Tirol	17,000
FC HOGO Hertha Wels	Wels	Huber Arena	3,000

== League table ==
Pos	Team	Pld	W	D	L	GF	GA	GD	Pts	Promotion or relegation
1	FC Blau-Weiß Linz	13	11	1	1	41	7	+34	34	Promotion to 2027–28 Austrian Football Bundesliga
2	First Vienna FC 1894	13	9	2	2	24	17	+7	29	
3	Austria Wien II	13	7	2	4	21	18	+3	23	
4	Admira Wacker	13	7	1	5	17	14	+3	22	
5	FC Wacker Innsbruck	13	6	2	5	19	15	+4	20	
6	FC Liefering	13	6	2	5	26	27	−1	20	
7	Austria Salzburg	13	6	1	6	22	20	+2	19	
8	ASK Voitsberg	13	5	3	5	25	21	+4	18	
9	Ertl Glas Amstetten	13	4	6	3	21	21	0	18	
10	FAC Wien	13	5	2	6	19	22	−3	17	
11	Schwarz-Weiß Bregenz	13	4	4	5	16	18	−2	16	
12	SKN St. Pölten	13	4	3	6	12	15	−3	15	
13	SK Sturm Graz II	13	4	3	6	22	26	−4	15	
14	Kapfenberger SV	13	3	2	8	15	25	−10	11	Relegation to 2027–28 Austrian Football Regionalliga
15	SK Rapid II	13	2	2	9	13	31	−18	8	Relegation to 2027–28 Austrian Football Regionalliga
16	FC HOGO Hertha Wels	13	2	2	9	15	31	−16	8	Relegation to 2027–28 Austrian Football Regionalliga

Updated to match(es) played on 21 November 2026. Source: 2.Liga Table
Rules for classification: 1) Points; 2) Direct Duel; 3) Goal difference; 4) Goals scored; 5) Matches won; 6) Away matches won; 7) Away goals scored

== Results ==
Home \ Away	ADM	AMS	AUS	AUW	BWL	BRE	FVI	FAC	KAP	LIE	RAP	STU	STP	ASV	WAI	WEL
Admira Wacker	—						0–1		1–0		0–1		2–2	3–2	1–0	
Ertl Glas Amstetten	2–1	—		4–2	1–1						3–2				2–3	1–1
Austria Salzburg	1–2	3–0	—		0–1		4–1	2–1	3–2			3–3				
Austria Wien II			3–1	—	0–3	2–0	1–1				4–1	1–0				2–2
FC Blau-Weiß Linz	3–0				—			3–0		4–1				5–1	3–0	4–1
Schwarz-Weiß Bregenz	1–0	0–0				—		4–0	3–2		1–1	3–1				
First Vienna FC 1894		1–0			0–6	2–1	—	2–0		2–2		4–0	3–1			
FAC WIEN	0–2	2–2		3–1				—	2–2	4–0			1–0		2–0	
Kapfenberger SV		3–4		0–1	2–1				—	0–4			1–1		0–1	1–0
FC Liefering			4–1	2–1		2–2				—		3–1			0–3	2–3
SK Rapid II					1–6		0–2	0–2		1–2	—			1–3	1–2	
SK Sturm Graz II	0–2	1–1						4–2	0–2		5–2	—		2–0	2–2	
SKN St. Pölten			1–0	0–1	0–1	2–1					0–0		—	0–2		2–1
ASK Voitsberg		1–1	2–1			0–0	1–2		4–0	2–3				—		
FC Wacker Innsbruck			0–1	1–2		5–0							1–0	1–1	—	
FC HOGO Hertha Wels	1–3		0–2			1–0	1–3				1–2	1–3		2–6		—

Updated to match(es) played on 21 November 2026. Source: soccerway.com
Legend: Blue = home team win; Yellow = draw; Red = away team win.

== Positions by round ==
Team ╲ Round	1	2	3	4	5	6	7
FC Blau-Weiß Linz	4	1	1	1	1	1	1
First Vienna FC	3	6	9	5	3	2	2
Floridsdorfer AC	7	12	10	6	4	5	3
SKU Ertl Glas Amstetten	8	4	7	8	11	8	4
Austria Wien II	13	10	2	9	7	10	5
FC Wacker Innsbruck	1	5	3	3	6	3	6
Austria Salzburg	5	2	5	2	5	7	7
FC Liefering	2	11	8	4	2	6	8
Schwarz-Weiß Bregenz	16	13	11	7	8	4	9
SKN St. Pölten	11	15	15	15	15	13	10
Admira Wacker	10	14	12	13	9	9	11
ASK Voitsberg	9	3	6	11	13	12	12
SK Sturm Graz II	15	8	14	14	10	11	13
SK Rapid II	6	9	4	10	12	14	14
FC HOGO Hertha Wels	12	7	13	12	14	15	15
Kapfenberger SV	14	16	16	16	16	16	16

Promotion to Austrian Bundesliga
Relegation to Austrian Regionalliga

Updated to match(es) played on 20 September 2026. Source: 2liga.at

== Results by round ==
Team ╲ Round	1	2	3	4	5	6	7
Admira Wacker	L	L	W	L	W	W	L
SKU Ertl Glas Amstetten	D	W	D	D	L	W	W
SV Austria Salzburg	W	W	L	W	L	D	L
Austria Wien II	L	W	W	L	W	L	W
FC Blau-Weiß Linz	W	W	W	W	L	W	W
Schwarz-Weiß Bregenz	L	W	D	W	L	W	L
First Vienna FC	W	L	D	W	W	W	W
FAC	W	L	D	W	W	L	W
Kapfenberger SV	L	L	L	L	W	L	L
FC Liefering	W	L	D	W	W	L	L
SK Rapid II	W	L	W	L	L	L	L
SK Sturm Graz II	L	W	L	L	W	D	D
SKN St. Pölten	L	L	L	L	W	W	W
ASK Voitsberg	D	W	D	L	L	D	W
FC Wacker Innsbruck	W	L	W	W	L	D	D
FC HOGO Hertha Wels	L	W	L	D	L	L	L

Updated to match(es) played on 20 September 2026. Source: 2liga.at
W = Win; D = Draw; L = Lose

== Season statistics ==
As of 13 September 2026

=== Top scorers ===
Rank	Player	Club	Goals
1	(Austria) Romeo Vučić	Blau-Weiß Linz	4
1	(Germany) Sebastian Malinowski	Hertha Wels	4
1	(Austria) Bernhard Zimmermann	First Vienna	4
1	(Austria) Christian Gebauer	Austria Salzburg	4
5	(Austria) Fabian Schubert	Voitsberg	3
5	(Austria) Nico Grimbs	Blau-Weiß Linz	3
5	(Slovenia) Lan Piskule	FAC	3
5	(Austria) Niklas Lang	Sturm Graz II	3
5	(Austria) Felix Köchl	Amstetten	3
5	(Turkey) Turgay Gemicibaşi	Admira Wacker	3
5	(Austria) Marco Hausjell	Young Violets	3
5	(Albania) Anteo Fetahu	SW Bregenz	3

== See also ==
- 2026–27 Austrian Football Bundesliga
- 2026–27 Austrian Cup
