= Manuel Maranda =

Austrian footballer

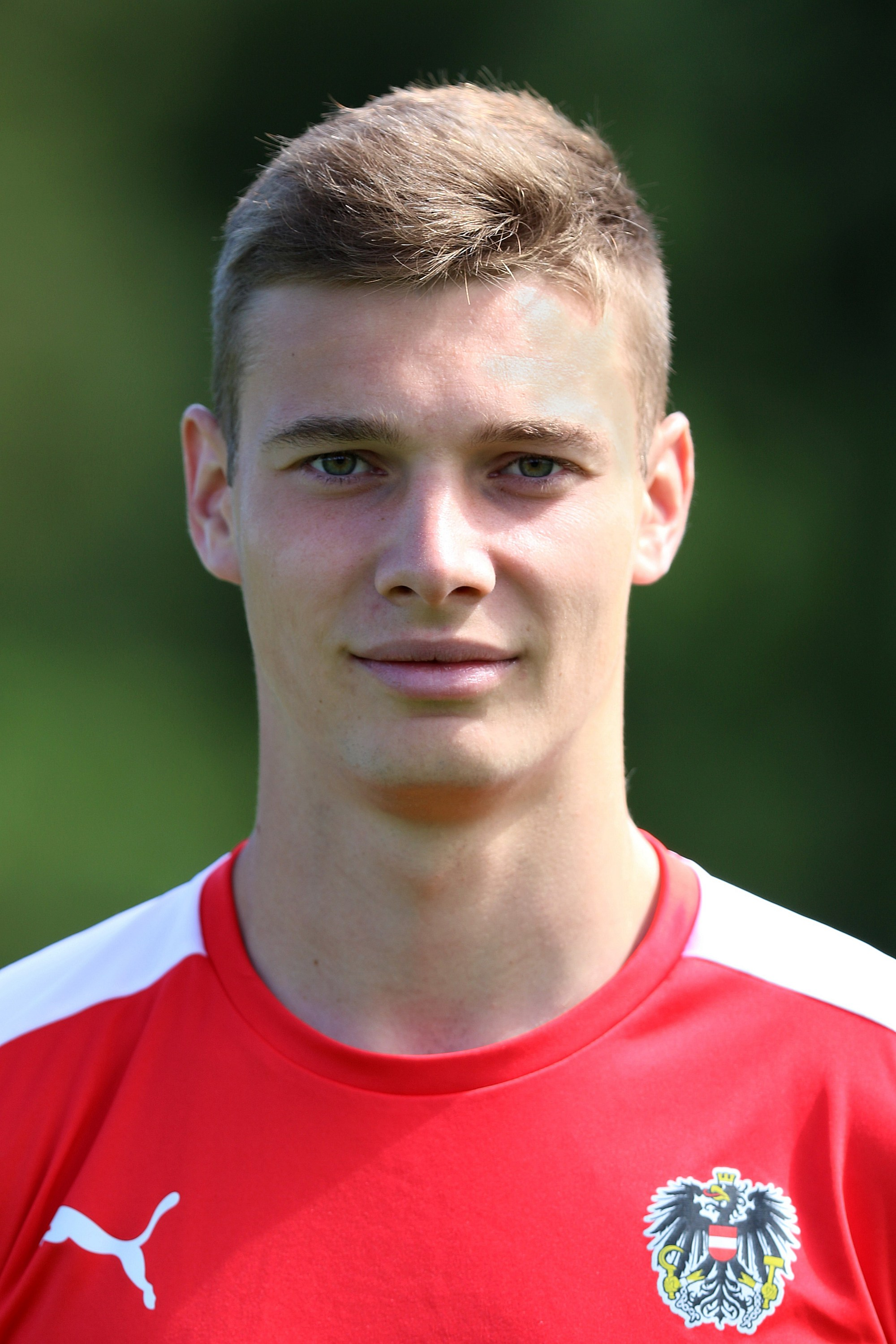
- Maranda in 2017

Personal information
- Date of birth: 9 July 1997 (age 29)
- Height: 1.88 m (6 ft 2 in)
- Position: Centre-back

Team information
- Current team: Blau-Weiß Linz
- Number: 15

Youth career
- 2003–2006: ASC Götzendorf
- 2009–2015: Admira Wacker

Senior career*
Years	Team	Apps	(Gls)
2015–2018	Admira Wacker II	43	(2)
2016–2018	Admira Wacker	21	(0)
2018–2019	Wacker Innsbruck II	10	(0)
2018–2019	Wacker Innsbruck	16	(0)
2019–2020	Carl Zeiss Jena	16	(0)
2020–2021	SKN St. Pölten	16	(0)
2021–	Blau-Weiß Linz	149	(8)

International career
2015	Austria U18	3	(1)
2015–2016	Austria U19	7	(0)
2017–2018	Austria U21	5	(0)
- * Club domestic league appearances and goals as of 10 June 2026

Manuel Maranda (born 9 July 1997) is an Austrian professional footballer who plays as a centre-back for Blau-Weiß Linz. His cousins Lukas and Philipp Malicsek are also footballers.
