= Paul Gobara =

Austrian footballer

Personal information
- Date of birth: 26 March 2000 (age 26)
- Place of birth: Vienna, Austria
- Height: 1.86 m (6 ft 1 in)
- Position: Defender

Team information
- Current team: Hertha Wels
- Number: 28

Youth career
- 2008–2018: Rapid Wien

Senior career*
Years	Team	Apps	(Gls)
2018–2023	Rapid Wien II	45	(1)
2020–2022	Rapid Wien	1	(0)
2021–2022	→ SV Horn (loan)	27	(2)
2023–2025	SV Horn	54	(0)
2025–	Hertha Wels	25	(3)

International career^{‡}
2015–2016	Austria U16	7	(0)
2016–2017	Austria U17	3	(0)
2017–2018	Austria U18	5	(0)
2018	Austria U19	1	(0)
- * Club domestic league appearances and goals as of 17 May 2026 ‡ National team caps and goals as of 3 December 2020

Paul Gobara (born 26 March 2000) is an Austrian professional footballer who plays as a defender for 2. Liga club Hertha Wels.

== Club career ==
Gobara made his professional debut with Rapid Wien in a 1–0 Austrian Bundesliga loss to TSV Hartberg on 21 June 2020.

On 7 July 2021, he joined SV Horn on loan for the 2021–22 season.
