= Kilian Schröcker =

Austrian association football player

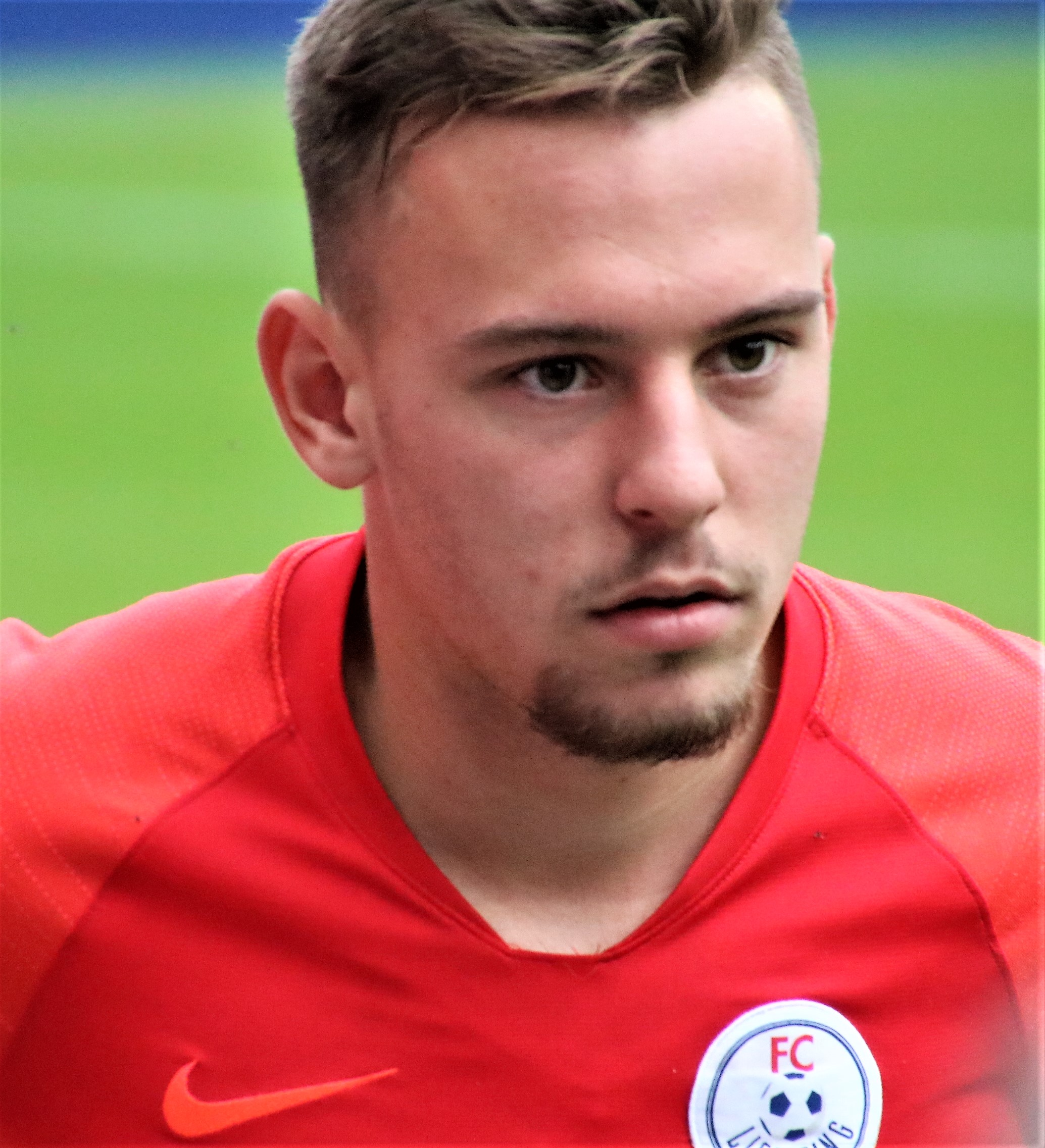

Personal information
- Date of birth: 3 September 2001 (age 25)
- Place of birth: Austria
- Position: Goalkeeper

Team information
- Current team: Saalfelden

Youth career
- –2012: TUS Admont
- 2012–2014: WSV Liezen
- 2014–2015: Sturm Graz
- 2015–2019: Red Bull Salzburg

Senior career*
Years	Team	Apps	(Gls)
2019–2021	Liefering	1	(0)
2020–2021	→ SV Grödig (loan)	4	(0)
2021–2024	Saalfelden	90	(0)
2024–2025	Lafnitz	5	(0)
2025–	Hertha Wels	18	(0)

International career
2018	Austria U17	1	(0)
- * Club domestic league appearances and goals as of 17 May 2026

Kilian Schröcker (born 3 September 2001) is an Austrian footballer who plays as a goalkeeper for Hertha Wels .

== Club career ==
Schröcker started playing football with TUS Admont, before moving to SK Sturm Graz in 2014. In 2015, he moved to the youth team of Red Bull Salzburg and then to Liefering since 2019. 2020 he went on loan to SV Grödig in the third league. 2021 he went on to FC Pinzgau Saalfelden, also a 3rd league side.

=== Liefering ===
On 7 March 2020, he made his professional debut for Liefering in a home match against Lafnitz, ending in a 4–1.
