= Yahya Genc =

Austrian footballer and manager (born 1974)

Personal information
- Date of birth: 3 August 1974 (age 52)
- Place of birth: Austria
- Position: Defender

Team information
- Current team: Hertha Wels (head coach)

Senior career*
Years	Team	Apps	(Gls)
–1994	FC Linz		
1994–1998	SV Gmunden		
1998–2000	FC Blau-Weiß Linz		
2000–2003	ASKÖ Pregarten		
2003–2004	Union Pregarten		
2004	SC Marchtrenk		
2004–2005	SV Sierning		
2005–2006	SV Gmunden		
2006–2008	ASKÖ Pregarten		

Managerial career
- 2006–2008: ASKÖ Pregarten (Player manager)
- 2008–2010: SV Gmunden
- 2010–2011: FC Wels
- 2013–2014: FC Blau-Weiß Linz
- 2015: SC Marchtrenk
- 2016: SV Sierning
- 2025–: Hertha Wels
- * Club domestic league appearances and goals

Yahya Genc (born 3 August 1974) is an Austrian football manager and former player. Who is currently the head coach of 2.Liga club Hertha Wels.
