= Antonio Verinac =

Croatian footballer (born 2004)

Personal information
- Date of birth: 27 December 2004 (age 21)
- Place of birth: Hamburg, Germany
- Height: 1.93 m (6 ft 4 in)
- Position: Forward

Team information
- Current team: Austria Lustenau (on loan from FC St. Gallen)
- Number: 39

Youth career
- FC St. Pauli
- Werder Bremen

Senior career*
Years	Team	Apps	(Gls)
2022	1. FC Lokomotive Leipzig	2	(0)
2022–2023	SSV Jeddeloh	8	(1)
2023–2024	1. FC Köln II	9	(0)
2024–2025	ETSV Hamburg	29	(27)
2025–2026	VfB Lübeck	20	(12)
2026–	FC St. Gallen	3	(0)
2026–	FC St. Gallen U-21	7	(4)
2026–	→ Austria Lustenau (loan)	6	(2)
- * Club domestic league appearances and goals as of 00:16, 17 September 2026 (BST)

Antonio Verinac (born 27 December 2004) is a professional footballer who plays as a forward for Austrian Bundesliga club Austria Lustenau, on loan from FC St. Gallen. Born in Germany, he has represented Croatia at youth international level.

== Career ==
Verinac played youth football for FC St. Pauli and Werder Bremen. On 17 June 2022, Verinac signed for 1. FC Lokomotive Leipzig on a one-year deal. On 15 September 2022, Verinac's contract was terminated after he was forced to finish his high school diploma in his hometown of Hamburg. He joined SSV Jeddeloh for the remainder of the season.

Verinac joined 1. FC Köln II in the summer of 2023. He then moved to ETSV Hamburg in the summer of 2024, scoring an impressive 27 goals in 29 league games. This earned him a move to VfB Lübeck on 5 June 2025.

In January 2026, Verinac joined FC St. Gallen on a four-year deal.

He joined Austria Lustenau on loan for the 2026–27 season.

== International career ==
Verinac was called up to Croatia U21 for the 2027 UEFA European Under-21 Championship qualification games versus Hungary, Ukraine, and Lithuania.

== Career statistics ==
As of match played 13 September 2026

Appearances and goals by club, season and competition
Club	Season	League			National cup (Note: Includes DFB-Pokal, Swiss Cup, and Austrian Cup)		Other		Total	
Club	Season	Division	Apps	Goals	Apps	Goals	Apps	Goals	Apps	Goals
1. FC Lokomotive Leipzig	2022–23	Regionalliga Nordost	2	0	0	0	0	0	2	0
SSV Jeddeloh	2022–23	Regionalliga Nord	8	1	0	0	0	0	8	1
1. FC Köln II	2023–24	Regionalliga West	9	0	0	0	0	0	9	0
ETSV Hamburg	2024–25	Oberliga Hamburg	29	27	0	0	0	0	29	27
VfB Lübeck	2025–26	Regionalliga Nord	20	12	1	0	0	0	21	12
FC St. Gallen	2025–26	Swiss Super League	3	0	0	0	0	0	3	0
FC St. Gallen	2026–27	Swiss Super League	0	0	0	0	0	0	0	0
FC St. Gallen	Total		3	0	0	0	0	0	0	0
FC St. Gallen U-21	2025–26	1. Liga Classic Group 3	7	4	0	0	0	0	7	4
Austria Lustenau (loan)	2026–27	Austrian Bundesliga	6	2	2	1	0	0	8	3
Career total			84	46	3	1	0	0	87	47
