= Philipp Malicsek =

Austrian footballer

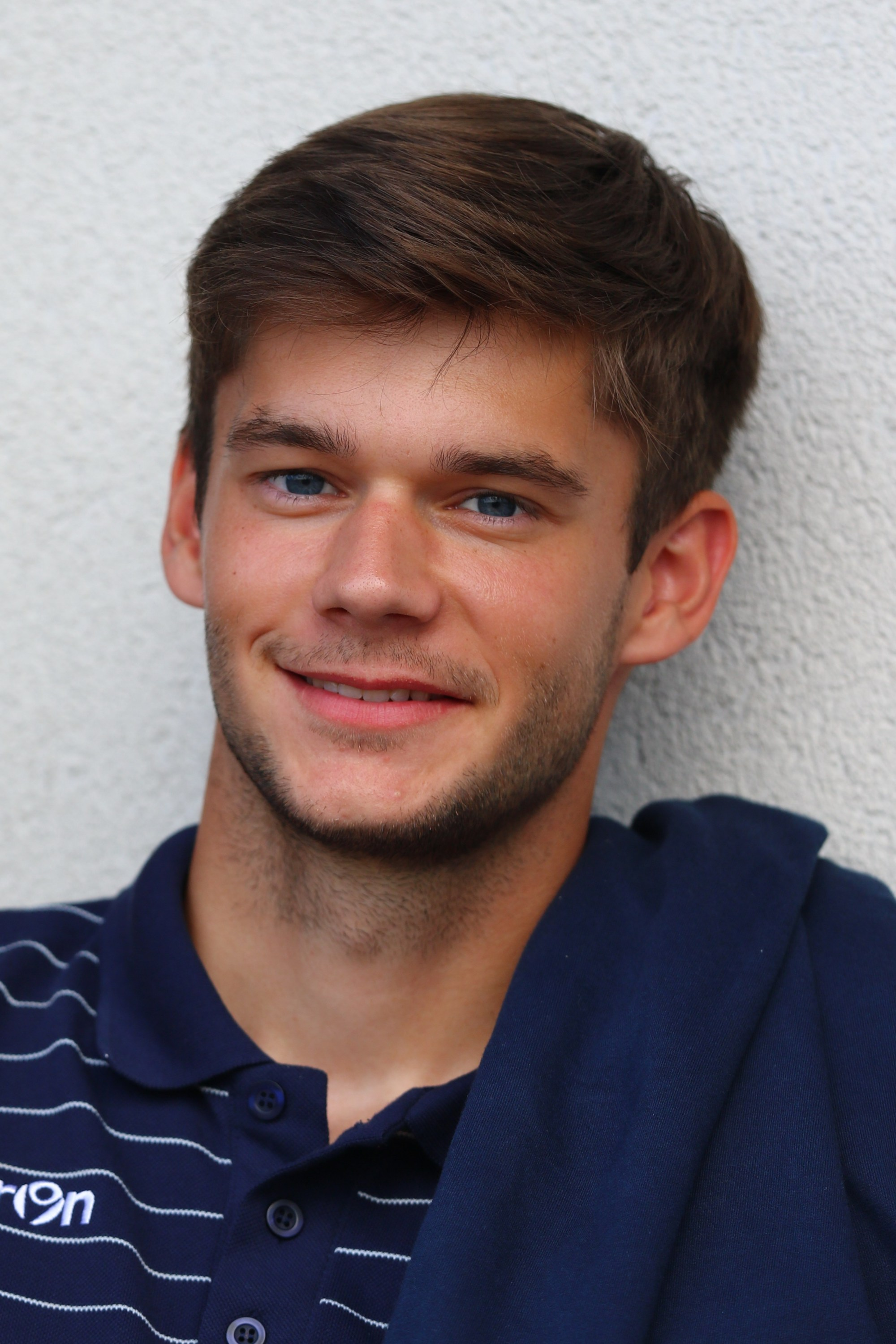

Personal information
- Date of birth: 3 June 1997 (age 29)
- Place of birth: Vienna, Austria
- Height: 1.80 m (5 ft 11 in)
- Position: Midfielder

Team information
- Current team: SC Wiener Viktoria
- Number: 18

Youth career
- 2003–2009: ASC Götzendorf
- 2009–2013: Admira Wacker

Senior career*
Years	Team	Apps	(Gls)
2014–2015	Admira Wacker II	23	(0)
2015–2016	Admira Wacker	27	(2)
2016–2018	Rapid Wien II	12	(1)
2016–2019	Rapid Wien	12	(2)
2018	→ St. Pölten (loan)	9	(0)
2019	Floridsdorfer AC	12	(1)
2020–2022	Blau-Weiß Linz	47	(0)
2022–2023	Vorwärts Steyr	0	(0)
2023–2025	Admira Wacker Panthers	18	(4)
2025–	SC Wiener Viktoria	27	(0)

International career^{‡}
2012–2013	Austria U-16	8	(2)
2014	Austria U-17	8	(0)
2014–2015	Austria U-18	6	(0)
2015–2016	Austria U-19	8	(1)
2017	Austria U-21	1	(0)
- * Club domestic league appearances and goals as of 28 June 2026 ‡ National team caps and goals as of 24 March 2017

Philipp Malicsek (born 3 June 1997) is an Austrian footballer who plays for SC Wiener Viktoria. His brother Lukas and his cousin Manuel Maranda are footballer.

== International career ==
He represented Austria at the 2016 UEFA European Under-19 Championship, where they were eliminated at group stage.
