= Tolgahan Sahin =

Austrian footballer

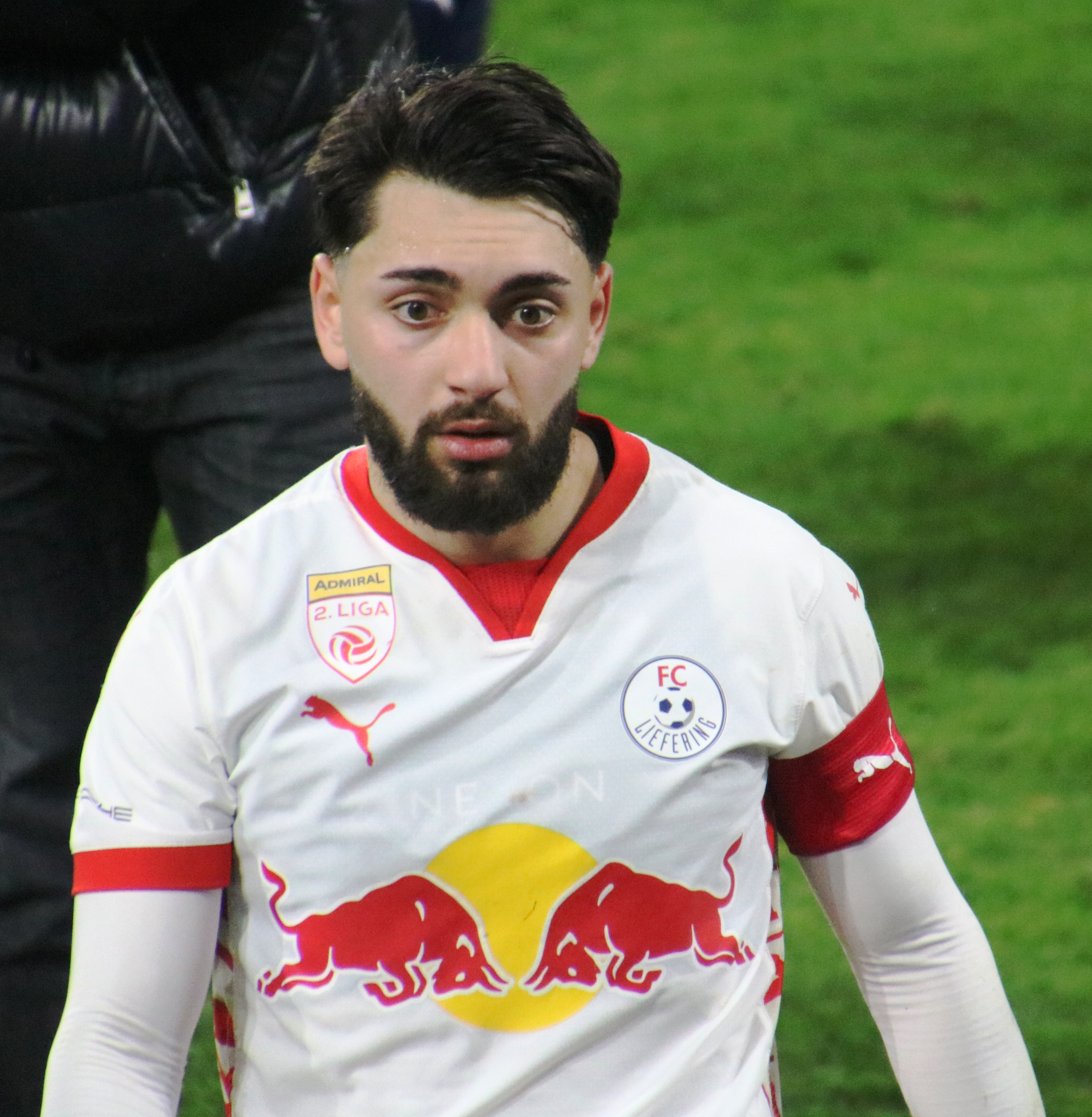
- Sahin in 2025

Personal information
- Date of birth: 10 October 2004 (age 22)
- Place of birth: Kirchdorf an der Krems, Austria
- Height: 1.70 m (5 ft 7 in)
- Position: Midfielder

Team information
- Current team: FC Hertha Wels
- Number: 61

Youth career
- 2011–2017: SV Grün-Weiß Micheldorf
- 2017–2018: LASK
- 2018: FC Liefering
- 2018–2021: Red Bull Salzburg

Senior career*
Years	Team	Apps	(Gls)
2021–2025	FC Liefering	63	(2)
2025	SV Stripfing	8	(1)
2026–	FC Hertha Wels	11	(0)

International career
2018–2019	Austria U15	9	(0)
2019	Austria U16	4	(0)
2020	Austria U17	1	(0)
2021–2022	Austria U18	9	(1)
2022	Austria U19	2	(0)
- * Club domestic league appearances and goals as of 17 May 2026

Tolgahan Sahin (born 10 October 2004) is an Austrian professional footballer who plays as a midfielder for FC Hertha Wels.

== Personal life ==
Born in Austria, Sahin is of Turkish descent.

== Career statistics ==
As of match played 25 May 2025

Appearances and goals by club, season and competition
Club	Season	League			National cup		Continental		Other		Total	
Club	Season	Division	Apps	Goals	Apps	Goals	Apps	Goals	Apps	Goals	Apps	Goals
FC Liefering	2021–22	2. Liga	15	0	—		—		0	0	15	0
FC Liefering	2022–23	2. Liga	25	0	—		—		0	0	25	0
FC Liefering	2023–24	2. Liga	2	0	—		—		0	0	2	0
FC Liefering	2024–25	2. Liga	21	2	—		—		0	0	21	2
Career total			63	2	0	0	0	0	0	0	63	2
