= Jaedin Rhodes =

South African soccer player

Personal information
- Date of birth: 11 April 2003 (age 23)
- Place of birth: Atlantis, South Africa
- Height: 1.76 m (5 ft 9 in)
- Position: Midfielder

Team information
- Current team: SV Ried
- Number: 11

Youth career
- Atlantis Leeds
- Hellenic
- Cape Town City

Senior career*
Years	Team	Apps	(Gls)
2022–2026	Cape Town City	75	(7)
2026–	SV Ried	2	(0)

International career^{‡}
2024–	South Africa	3	(0)
- * Club domestic league appearances and goals as of 14 August 2026 ‡ National team caps and goals as of 26 October 2024

Jaedin Rhodes (born 11 April 2003) is a South African soccer player who plays as a midfielder for Austrian Bundesliga club SV Ried.

== Career ==
He was born in Atlantis, South Africa and grew up in a "ghetto", which according to himself was tough to get out of. He was reportedly seen playing soccer in the street and brought to the club Atlantis Leeds FC. He then played for Hellenic F.C. and attended Robinvale High School, before joining Cape Town City. He played in the Engen Cup and eventually the Diski Challenge Shield. Rhodes made his senior debut for Cape Town City in February 2022, as a starter even, against Kaizer Chiefs, thus getting his first-tier debut in the 2021-22 South African Premier Division.

Within his club, he was named as Young Player of the Year in 2022–23. The club managed to prolong his contract in 2023.

He became a regular playing most of the games in 2023–24, being the club's best player according to Michael Morton. He was called up for South Africa for the 2024 COSAFA Cup, where he made his international debut against Mozambique and played all three group matches – until South Africa was knocked out of the tournament.
