= Anteo Fetahu =

Albanian footballer (born 2002)

Personal information
- Date of birth: 10 July 2002 (age 24)
- Height: 1.82 m (6 ft 0 in)
- Position: Forward

Team information
- Current team: Schwarz-Weiß Bregenz
- Number: 10

Youth career
- FC Ingolstadt 04
- 2017–2018: Quelle Fürth
- 2018–2019: Neumarkt
- 2020: Greuther Fürth
- 2020–2021: Landshut

Senior career*
Years	Team	Apps	(Gls)
2021–2023	BW Linz	22	(3)
2023–2024	Dornbirn	27	(8)
2024–2026	Rheindorf Altach	11	(2)
2024–2025	→ Schwarz-Weiß Bregenz (loan)	8	(1)
2026–	Schwarz-Weiß Bregenz	3	(0)

International career
2022	Albania U21	1	(0)
- * Club domestic league appearances and goals as of 15 August 2026

Anteo Fetahu (born 10 July 2002) is an Albanian professional footballer who plays as a forward for Austrian 2. Liga club Schwarz-Weiß Bregenz.

== Club career ==
Fetahu joined Blau-Weiß Linz in June 2021.

In Summer 2024, Fetahu joined Rheindorf Altach and was immediately loaned out to Schwarz-Weiß Bregenz.

== International career ==
Fetahu has represented Albania at youth international level.

== Career statistics ==
=== Club ===
As of 15 September 2023

Appearances and goals by club, season and competition
Club	Season	League			Cup		Other		Total	
Club	Season	Division	Apps	Goals	Apps	Goals	Apps	Goals	Apps	Goals
BW Linz	2021–22	2. Liga	16	3	2 (Note: Appearances in the Austrian Cup)	0	0	0	18	3
BW Linz	2022–23	2. Liga	6	0	1	2	0	0	7	2
BW Linz	Total		22	3	3	2	0	0	25	5
Dornbirn	2023–24	2. Liga	6	1	1	0	0	0	7	1
Career total			28	4	4	2	0	0	32	6
