= Jussef Nasrawe =

Iraqi footballer (born 2007)

Personal information
- Date of birth: 22 March 2007 (age 19)
- Place of birth: Munich, Germany
- Height: 1.73 m (5 ft 8 in)
- Positions: Midfielder; left-back; wing-back

Team information
- Current team: SV Ried
- Number: 10

Youth career
- 2013–2015: TSV Milbertshofen
- 2015–2025: Bayern Munich

Senior career*
Years	Team	Apps	(Gls)
2024–2026	Bayern Munich II	21	(1)
2026	→ SV Ried (loan)	13	(0)
2026–	SV Ried	8	(1)

International career^{‡}
2023	Germany U16	1	(0)
2023–2024	Germany U17	6	(0)
2026–	Iraq	4	(0)
- * Club domestic league appearances and goals as of 7 November 2026 ‡ National team caps and goals as of 17 November 2026

Jussef Nasrawe (Arabic: يوسف نصراوي; born 22 March 2007) is a professional footballer who plays as a midfielder, left-back and wing-back for Austrian Bundesliga club SV Ried. Born in Germany, he plays for the Iraq national team.

== Club career ==
=== Bayern Munich ===
As a youth player, Nasrawe started his career with TSV Milbertshofen, and later joined the youth academy of Bundesliga side Bayern Munich in 2015.

He received his first call-up and debuted professionally with Bayern Munich II on 26 July 2024, coming off the bench during a 2–2 home draw Regionalliga Bayern match against SpVgg Ansbach.

Nasrawe scored his first professional goal with Bayern Munich II during a 2–1 away win Regionalliga Bayern match against FC Augsburg II, on 25 July 2025.

He was listed as part of the Bayern Munich's senior team squad for the 2025–26 UEFA Champions League.

==== Loan to SV Ried ====
On 23 January 2026, Nasrawe joined Austrian Bundesliga club SV Ried, on loan with an option to make the move permanent at the end of the season.

=== SV Ried ===
On 24 May 2026, SV Ried announced the permanent signing of Nasrawe, ahead of the 2026–27 season. On 2 August 2026, Nasrawe scored his first goal for SV Ried in the opening match of the 2026–27 Austrian Bundesliga season against Austria Lustenau.

== International career ==
Born in Munich, Germany, he holds dual German and Iraqi citizenship, making him eligible to represent either nation. Nasrawe represented Germany at the under-16 and under-17 levels.

In early 2026, he was nominated by the Iraq Football Association as eligible to be selected by the Iraq national team ahead of the 2026 FIFA World Cup, having already been scouted by the national team's head coach Graham Arnold and assistant coach René Meulensteen for some time, closely following his development. On 19 May 2026, Nasrawe was one of the 34 players who were called up by Iraq for the preliminary 2026 FIFA World Cup squad.

On 29 May 2026, Nasrawe came off the bench for Ahmed Qasem in the 65th minute of Iraq's pre-World Cup friendly against Andorra, making his senior international debut as Iraq continued their preparations for the upcoming FIFA World Cup.

== Career statistics ==
As of match played 25 May 2026

Appearances and goals by club, season and competition
Club	Season	League			Cup		Continental		Other		Total	
Club	Season	Division	Apps	Goals	Apps	Goals	Apps	Goals	Apps	Goals	Apps	Goals
Bayern Munich II	2024–25	Regionalliga Bayern	2	0	—		—		—		2	0
Bayern Munich II	2025–26	Regionalliga Bayern	19	1	—		—		—		19	1
Bayern Munich II	Total		21	1	—		—		—		21	1
SV Ried (loan)	2025–26	Austrian Bundesliga	13	0	0	0	—		3 (Note: Appearances in Conference League play-offs)	0	16	0
SV Ried (loan)	Total		13	0	0	0	—		3	0	16	0
Career Total			34	1	0	0	0	0	3	0	37	1

=== International ===
As of match played 26 September 2026

Appearances and goals by national team and year
National team	Year	Apps	Goals
Iraq	2026	2	0
Total		2	0
