= Lukas Malicsek =

Austrian footballer

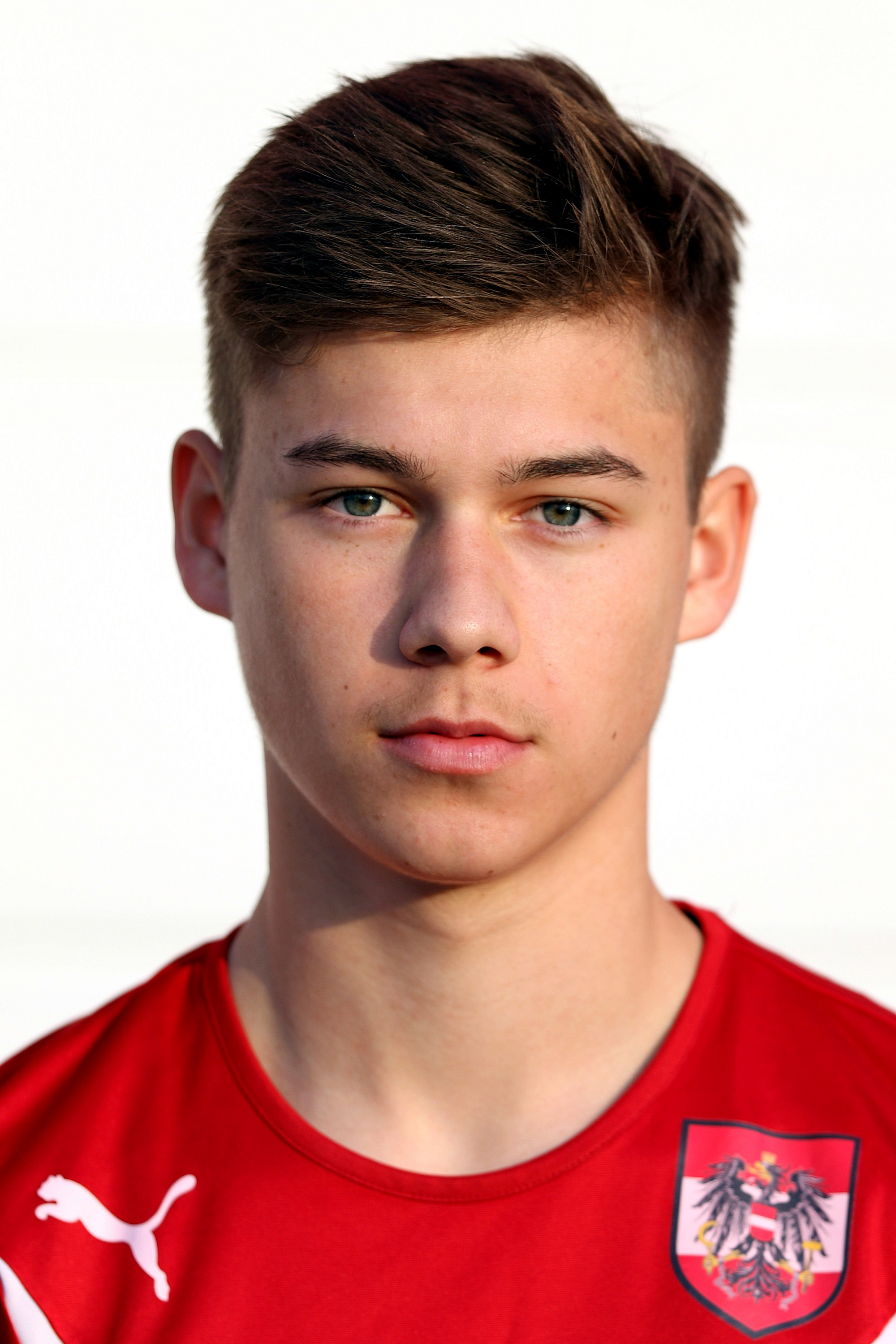
- Malicsek in 2017

Personal information
- Date of birth: 6 June 1999 (age 27)
- Place of birth: Vienna, Austria
- Height: 1.82 m (6 ft 0 in)
- Position: Defensive midfielder

Team information
- Current team: SV Ried
- Number: 4

Youth career
- 2005–2009: ASC Götzendorf
- 2009–2016: Admira Wacker

Senior career*
Years	Team	Apps	(Gls)
2016–2020	Admira Wacker II	56	(0)
2017–2026	Admira Wacker	158	(9)
2019–2020	→ SV Horn (loan)	24	(1)
2026–	SV Ried	3	(0)

International career^{‡}
2015–2016	Austria U17	11	(0)
2016–2017	Austria U18	6	(0)
2017–2018	Austria U19	8	(0)
2019	Austria U20	2	(0)
2019–2020	Austria U21	8	(0)
- * Club domestic league appearances and goals as of 14 August 2026 ‡ National team caps and goals as of 11:12, 23 June 2022 (UTC)

Lukas Malicsek (born 6 June 1999) is an Austrian professional footballer who plays as a midfielder for Austrian Bundesliga club SV Ried. His brother Philipp and his cousin Manuel Maranda are also footballers.
