= Schwarz-Weiß Bregenz =

Association football club in Austria

- Full name: Sportclub Schwarz-Weiß Bregenz
- Founded: 1919; 107 years ago 27 June 2005; 21 years ago (refounded)
- Ground: ImmoAgentur Stadion
- Capacity: 5,000
- Chairman: Thomas Fricke
- Manager: Andreas Heraf
- League: 2. Liga
- 2025–26: 2. Liga, 15th of 16
Home colours	Away colours

Schwarz-Weiß Bregenz or SW Bregenz (formerly Sportclub Bregenz or SC Bregenz) is a professional association football club based in the town of Bregenz, Vorarlberg, Austria. The club competes in Austrian 2. Liga, the second tier of the Austrian football. Founded in 1919, it is affiliated to the Vorarlberg Football Association. The team plays its home matches at ImmoAgentur Stadion, where it has been based since 1951. The club's history includes numerous promotions and relegations and some spells of sustained success, including participation in the UEFA Intertoto Cup in 2002 and 2004. The club went bankrupt in 2005 and was subsequently refounded.

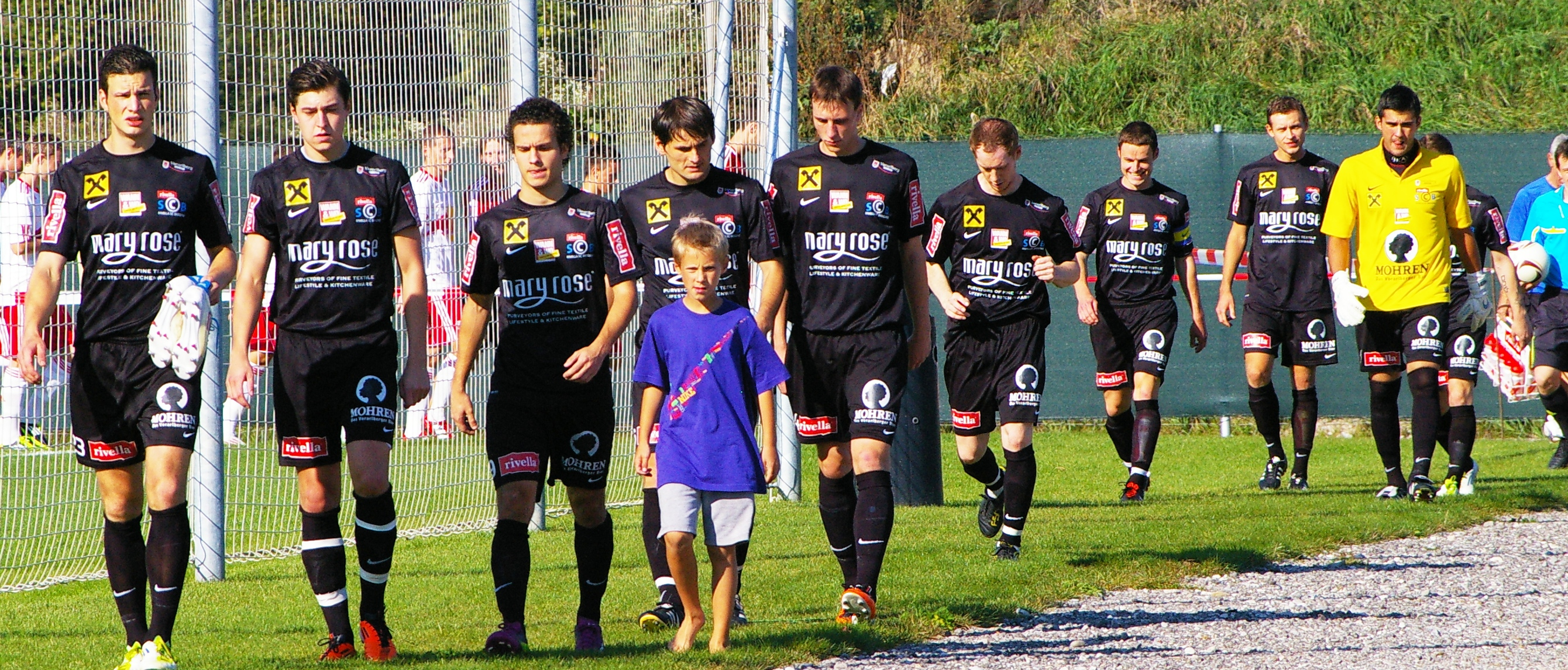
Part of the squad before the away match versus Red Bull Juniors Salzburg

== History ==
=== Early years (1919–1945) ===
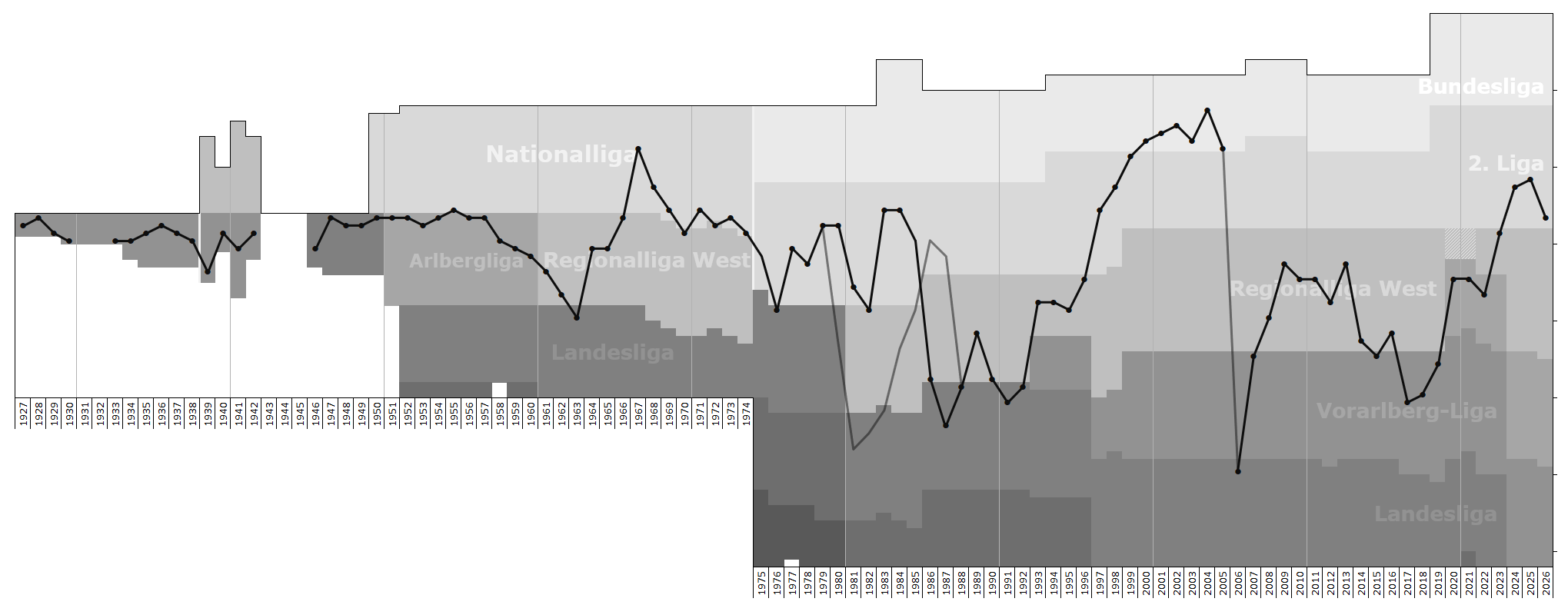
Historical chart of SW Bregenz league performance

FC Bregenz was founded on 28 June 1919 with the club colours being black and white, making it the fourth oldest football club in the Vorarlberg region. In its early history, the club played mainly friendly matches against German and Swiss clubs from around Lake Constance. In 1927, the Bregenz based club made its first appearance in the Vorarlberger A-Klasse, the highest level in Vorarlberg at the time, where they finished second. Already in 1928, FC Bregenz became Vorarlberg champions ahead of FA Turnerbund Lustenau (today SC Austria Lustenau) and FC Lustenau. In 1930, FC Bregenz only reached fourth place and, as a result, were relegated from the A-Klasse. In 1933, the Bregenz team was back in the top flight and managed to stay in the Vorarlberger A-Klasse until its upheaval in 1938. After the Anschluss in 1938, the Vorarlberger A-Klasse was replaced by the Bodensee-Vorarlberg Bezirksklasse. The best clubs in Vorarlberg (including FC Bregenz) now played in the same league with clubs such as VfB Friedrichshafen, VfL Lindau, SV Weingarten, FC Lindenberg, and other clubs from Meckenbeuren, Langenargen, Ravensburg, and other areas in Germany. The 1941–42 season was cancelled due to World War II.

=== After World War II (1945–1999) ===
After the end of the war, FC Bregenz returned to its footballing activities. However, the club had to choose a new name as ordered by the French occupying forces. In 1945, the club was therefore renamed Schwarz-Weiß Bregenz. The club logo, which was designed by Bregenz honorary member Hans Kolb, also dates from this year. As early as 1946, Schwarz-Weiß Bregenz played in the highest league in Vorarlberg, which was now called 1. Klasse Vorarlberg. A Vorarlberg league championship was held until 1950. In 1950, the Arlbergliga was founded by the football associations of Vorarlberg and Tyrol. After winning several championships, Schwarz-Weiß Bregenz became the first club from Vorarlberg to be promoted to the top division of Austria, the Staatsliga, in 1954. However, the club only managed one season at the highest level, and they were relegated again the following year. In 1960, the Regionalliga West was founded, in which Bregenz played for many years.

In 1966, Schwarz-Weiß ventured into the top Austrian division for a second time and even finished sixth (1966–67 season). Two years later they were relegated again – only to return in the 1970–71 season under the sponsor name SC Olymp Bregenz. After one year, they relegated again.

The 1970s were marked by several mergers and name changes. In the 1973–74 campaign, after a merger with FC Rätia Bludenz, which had been promoted to the first division, the club was called FC Vorarlberg for a short time. In the 1974–75 season the official name was SC Vorwerk Vorarlberg (Bregenz) after the new sponsor was introduced. The most momentous merger occurred in 1979: Schwarz-Weiß Bregenz merged with FC Dornbirn 1913 and was named IG Bregenz/Dornbirn until 1987. Under the name Schwarz-Weiß Bregenz, the team was promoted to the second division in 1996. After Casinos Austria became the main sponsor, the Bregenz club started playing as Casino SW Bregenz.

=== Bundesliga, Europe, and bankruptcy (1999–2005) ===
Between 1999 and the 2004–05 season, the club played in the Austrian Bundesliga. In 2002 and 2004, Bregenz also played European football in the UEFA Intertoto Cup. Opponents included Torino, against whom the club was eliminated after a 1–0 away defeat at the Stadio Delle Alpi and a 1–1 draw at home.

After a successful run, the club ran into increasingly severe financial problems. A poor 2004–05 season was followed by relegation to the second-tier Erste Liga. However, the club was denied a licence for the following season due to financial problems. After also losing the battle before the permanent neutral arbitration court of the Austrian Bundesliga, Bregenz filed for bankruptcy and was consequently dissolved.

=== Resurgence (2005–present) ===
The senior team was admitted to the 5th level of the Austrian football pyramid and adapted the traditional black and white club colours of the former SW Bregenz in the 2009–10 season. On 8 July 2013 the club was renamed Schwarz-Weiß Bregenz again and they also took over the logo of the former club.

The club was relegated from Austrian Regionalliga West in 2016.

In 2022–23, Schwarz-Weiß Bregenz secure promotion to Austrian 2. Liga from 2023 to 2024 and champions of Regionalliga West in 2022–23.

== Stadium ==
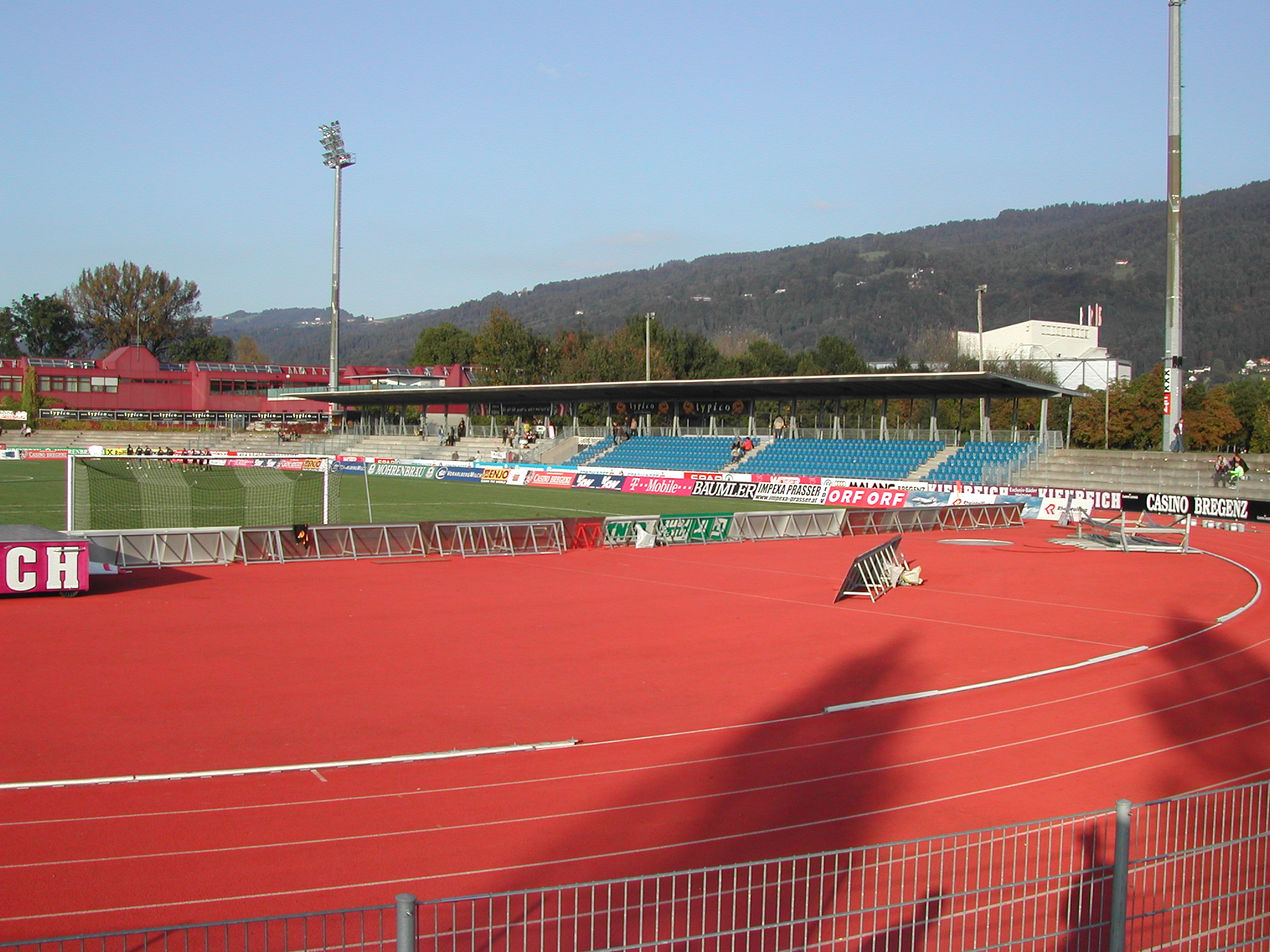
Casino Stadium in 2002

The ImmoAgentur Stadium in Bregenz, which was constructed in 1994 as the Casino Stadium to replace the demolished Bodensee Stadium, has a capacity of 12,000 spectators (of which approx. 4,000 are seated). The record attendance was 10,800 for the Vorarlberg derby against SC Austria Lustenau in the Austrian Bundesliga in the autumn of 1999. Since the bankruptcy of SW Bregenz in 2005, the successor club SC Bregenz and, since the 2013–14, Schwarz-Weiß Bregenz, have played their home games there. The stadium is located close to the city centre (next to the railway station and the Festspielhaus Bregenz) and in the immediate vicinity of Lake Constance.

== European record ==
Season	Competition	Round	Club	Home	Away	Aggregate
2002	UEFA Intertoto Cup	1R	(Cyprus) Enosis Neon Paralimni	3–1	2–0	5–1
2002	UEFA Intertoto Cup	2R	(Italy) Torino	1–1	0–1	1–2
2004	UEFA Intertoto Cup	1R	(Azerbaijan) Khazar Universiteti	0–3	1–2	1–5

Notes

- SW Bregenz goals listed first
- R1: First round
- R2: Second round

== Current squad ==
As of 23 September 2026

Note: Flags indicate national team as defined under FIFA eligibility rules; some limited exceptions apply. Players may hold more than one non-FIFA nationality.

No.	Pos.	Nation	Player
1	GK	BRA	João Paulo
3	DF	BRA	Willian Rodrigues
4	DF	CAN	Dredon Kelly
5	MF	AUT	Dragan Marceta
6	DF	JPN	Yusei Shima
7	FW	BRA	Nicolas Rossi
8	MF	AUT	Lars Nussbaumer
10	FW	ALB	Anteo Fetahu
12	FW	AUT	Micha Fröde
13	DF	BRA	Henrique Torelli
14	MF	JPN	Genta Omotehara
16	DF	BRA	Rodrigo Souza
18	MF	JPN	Daigo Araki
20	MF	BRA	Gabryel

No.	Pos.	Nation	Player
21	FW	AUT	Damian Maksimovic
22	FW	AUT	Daniel Au Yeong
23	FW	ENG	La'Sean Sealey
24	FW	JPN	Atsushi Zaizen
25	MF	SLE	George Davies
27	GK	AUT	Dominik Samardzija
29	FW	JPN	Keita Saito
30	DF	SLE	Saidu Bangura
31	GK	JPN	Peter Aizawa
32	DF	SUI	Mika Mettler
35	MF	BRA	Thalissinho
43	DF	BRA	João Cesco
47	MF	BRA	Lucas Dantas
80	MF	BRA	Mateus Cecchini
