= Samuel Chukwudi =

Faroese footballer (born 2003)

Personal information
- Full name: Samuel Johansen Chukwudi
- Date of birth: 25 June 2003 (age 23)
- Place of birth: Faroe Islands
- Height: 1.95 m (6 ft 5 in)
- Position: Defender

Team information
- Current team: SV Ried
- Number: 28

Youth career
- –2020: HB
- 2022: Union SG

Senior career*
Years	Team	Apps	(Gls)
2019–2021	HB II	15	(0)
2019–2024	HB	61	(2)
2022	→ Union SG U23 (loan)	9	(0)
2025–2026	SJK	36	(4)
2026–	SV Ried	5	(0)

International career^{‡}
2016–2017	Faroe Islands U15	4	(0)
2019	Faroe Islands U17	9	(0)
2020–2021	Faroe Islands U21	7	(0)
2022–	Faroe Islands	11	(0)
- * Club domestic league appearances and goals as of 8 September 2026 ‡ National team caps and goals as of 8 October 2026

Samuel Johansen Chukwudi (born 25 June 2003) is a Faroese footballer who plays as a defender for Austrian Bundesliga club SV Ried and the Faroe Islands national team.

== Club career ==
Since 2019, Chukwudi played for Faroe Islands Premier League club HB Torshavn, and additionally with the club's reserve team.

In 2022, Chukwudi signed for the youth academy of Belgian side Union SG.

In January 2025, Chukwudi left HB Torshavn after signing with Finnish Veikkausliiga club SJK Seinäjoki on a two-year deal with a one-year option, for an undisclosed fee, becoming the first Faroese player to play in the Finnish top tier. He made his SJK debut on 15 February, in a 3–1 loss against KuPS in Finnish League Cup. On 16 May, Chukwudi scored his first goals in the league, by a brace in a 2–2 away draw against IF Gnistan. On June 30 2026, in what may be described as another notable move, Chukwudi moved to SV Ried in the Austrian Bundesliga. This made him the first Faroese footballer to play in the Austrian top tier.

== International career ==
Chukwudi is a former Faroe Islands youth international. He made his senior national team debut for the Faroe Islands national team in 2022.

== Personal life ==
Chukwudi is of Nigerian descent and was also eligible to represent Nigeria internationally.

== Career statistics ==
=== Club ===
As of 19 November 2025

Appearances and goals by club, season and competition
Club	Season	League			National cup (Note: Includes Faroe Islands Cup and Suomen Cup)		League cup (Note: Includes Finnish League Cup)		Europe		Other		Total	
Club	Season	Division	Apps	Goals	Apps	Goals	Apps	Goals	Apps	Goals	Apps	Goals	Apps	Goals
HB Torshavn II	2019	1. deild	3	0	–		–		–		–		3	0
HB Torshavn II	2020	1. deild	7	0	–		–		–		–		7	0
HB Torshavn II	2021	1. deild	5	0	–		–		–		–		5	0
HB Torshavn II	Total		15	0	0	0	0	0	0	0	0	0	15	0
HB Torshavn	2019	Faroe Islands Premier League	3	0	0	0	–		–		–		3	0
HB Torshavn	2020	Faroe Islands Premier League	18	0	1	0	–		0	0	0	0	19	0
HB Torshavn	2021	Faroe Islands Premier League	8	0	1	0	–		0	0	0	0	9	0
HB Torshavn	2022	Faroe Islands Premier League	2	0	0	0	–		1 (Note: Appearance(s) in UEFA Conference League)	0	–		3	0
HB Torshavn	2023	Faroe Islands Premier League	7	1	3	0	–		1	0	–		11	1
HB Torshavn	2024	Faroe Islands Premier League	23	1	5	0	–		2	0	1 (Note: Includes Faroe Islands Super Cup)	0	31	1
HB Torshavn	Total		61	2	10	0	0	0	4	0	1	0	76	2
Union SG U23 (loan)	2022–23	Belgian Division 2	9	0	–		–		–		–		9	0
SJK Seinäjoki	2025	Veikkausliiga	23	3	2	0	3	0	0	0	–		28	3
Career total			108	5	12	0	3	0	4	0	1	0	128	5

=== International ===
As of match played 6 October 2026

Faroe Islands
Year	Apps	Goals
2022	2	0
2023	0	0
2024	3	0
2025	1	0
2026	5	0
Total	11	0

== Honours ==
HB Torshavn

- Faroe Islands Premier League: 2020
- Faroe Islands Cup (3): 2020, 2023, 2024
- Faroe Islands Super Cup (2): 2021, 2024
