= Dominik Weixelbraun =

Austrian footballer (born 2003)

Personal information
- Date of birth: 17 December 2003 (age 22)
- Place of birth: Gmünd, Austria
- Height: 1.80 m (5 ft 11 in)
- Position: Forward

Team information
- Current team: Austria Lustenau (on loan from Rapid Wien)
- Number: 11

Youth career
- 2009–2016: SV Kirchberg/Walde
- 2016–2021: AKA St. Pölten

Senior career*
Years	Team	Apps	(Gls)
2021–2022	FC Juniors OÖ	28	(8)
2022–2024	LASK	0	(0)
2022–2024	→ SKU Amstetten (loan)	53	(3)
2024–2025	SKU Amstetten	27	(9)
2024	SKU Amstetten II	4	(3)
2025–	SK Rapid Wien	9	(0)
2025–	SK Rapid Wien II	6	(0)
2026–	→ SC Austria Lustenau (loan)	6	(3)

International career^{‡}
2021–2022	Austria U19	9	(1)
- * Club domestic league appearances and goals as of 22:37, 16 September 2026 (BST) ‡ National team caps and goals as of 22:37, 16 September 2026 (UTC)

Dominik Weixelbraun (born 17 December 2003) is an Austrian professional footballer who plays as a forward for Austrian Bundesliga club Austria Lustenau, on loan from Rapid Wien.

== Career ==
Weixelbraun began his career at SV Kirchberg/Walde, before joining AKA St. Pölten, a local regional academy side. He joined FC Juniors OÖ ahead of the 2021–22 season, signing a three-year contract. He made his senior debut on 23 July 2021, starting in a 4–2 defeat versus SV Lafnitz.

In 2022, Weixelbraun signed a professional contract with LASK, but remained with Juniors OÖ for the remainder of the season.

After Juniors OÖ withdrew from the 2. Liga at the end of the 2021–22 season, LASK entered a partnership with SKU Amstetten. This resulted in Weixelbraun joining Amstetten at the beginning of the 2022–23 season. Originally joining on a one-year loan, this was extended for another season. Weixelbraun signed permanently for Amstetten for the 2024–25 season.

Following a successful campaign, Weixelbraun joined SK Rapid Wien II on a two-year deal. He made his debut for Rapid Wien's first team on 24 July 2025, coming on for Andrija Radulović in a 2–0 win versus FK Dečić.

Weixelbraun joined SC Austria Lustenau on loan for the 2026–27 season.

== International career ==
Weixelbraun was called up to the Austria U19 team in 2021, and made his debut versus Turkey in a 3–0 friendly defeat. He scored his first international goal in a 3–2 victory versus Wales.

== Career statistics ==
As of match played 13 September 2026

Appearances and goals by club, season and competition
Club	Season	League			Austrian Cup		Other		Total	
Club	Season	Division	Apps	Goals	Apps	Goals	Apps	Goals	Apps	Goals
FC Juniors OÖ	2021–22	2. Liga	28	8	0	0	0	0	28	8
LASK	2022–23	Bundesliga	0	0	0	0	0	0	0	0
LASK	2023–24	Bundesliga	0	0	0	0	0	0	0	0
LASK	Total		0	0	0	0	0	0	0	0
SKU Amstetten (loan)	2022–23	2. Liga	29	2	1	0	0	0	30	2
SKU Amstetten (loan)	2023–24	2. Liga	24	1	3	1	0	0	27	2
SKU Amstetten (loan)	Total		53	3	4	1	0	0	57	4
SKU Amstetten	2024–25	2. Liga	27	9	1	0	0	0	28	9
SKU Amstetten II	2024–25	Lower Austria 2. Landesliga West	4	3	0	0	0	0	4	3
SK Rapid Wien	2025–26	Bundesliga	9	0	2	0	6 (Note: Appearance(s) in UEFA Conference League)	1	17	1
SK Rapid Wien	2026–27	Bundesliga	0	0	0	0	0	0	0	0
SK Rapid Wien	Total		9	0	2	0	6	1	17	1
SK Rapid Wien II	2025–26	2. Liga	6	0	0	0	0	0	6	0
SC Austria Lustenau (loan)	2026–27	Bundesliga	6	3	1	1	0	0	7	4
Career total			133	26	8	2	6	1	147	29
