= Willian Rodrigues =

Brazilian footballer

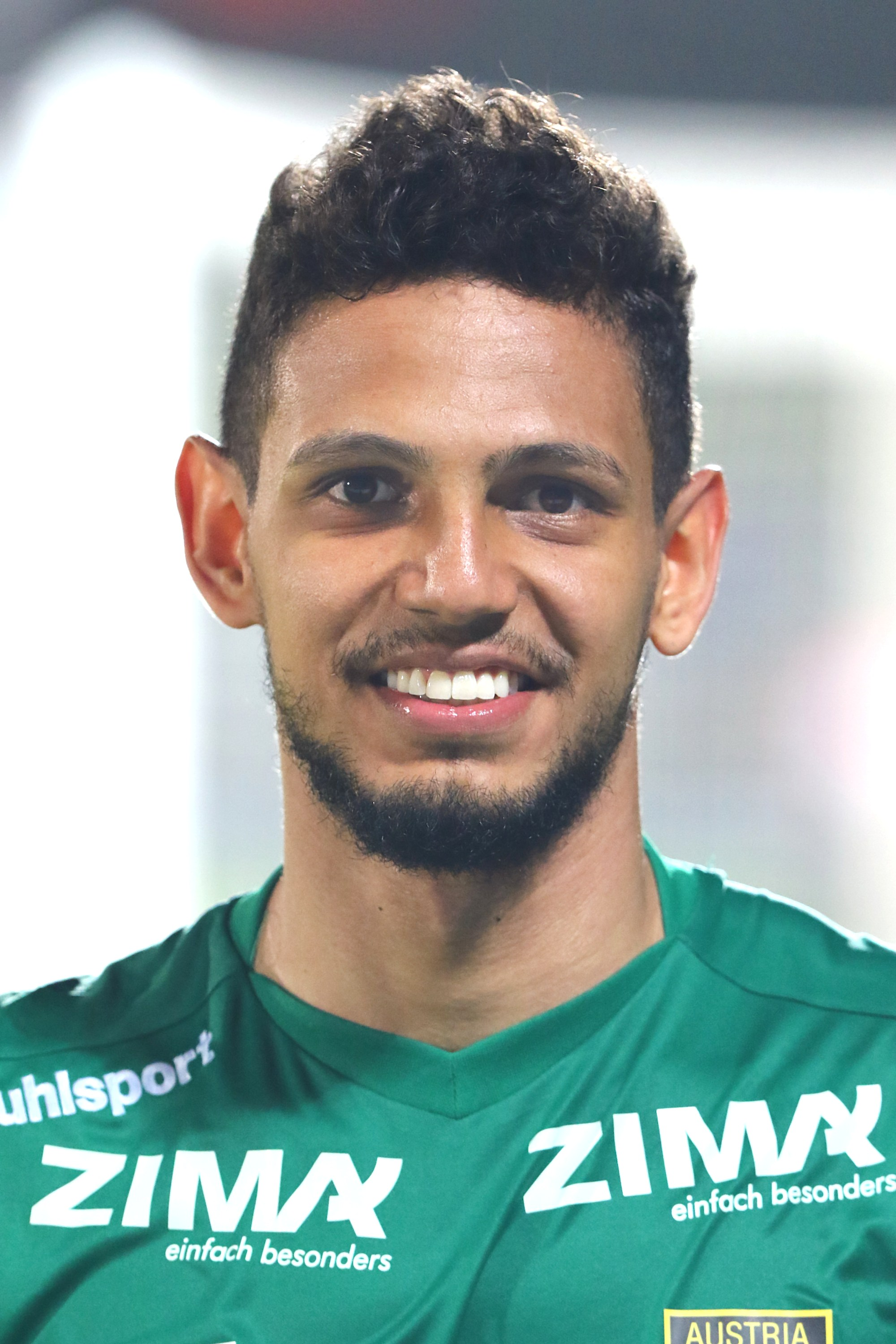

Personal information
- Full name: Willian Rodrigues de Freitas
- Date of birth: 9 September 1993 (age 33)
- Place of birth: Curitiba, Brazil
- Height: 1.81 m (5 ft 11 in)
- Position: Defensive midfielder

Team information
- Current team: FC Dornbirn
- Number: 18

Senior career*
Years	Team	Apps	(Gls)
2013–2016	Coritiba	1	(0)
2013–2014	→ AFC United (loan)	22	(0)
2015	→ Grêmio Barueri (loan)	16	(1)
2016	→ Metropolitano (loan)	8	(1)
2017	Metropolitano	13	(0)
2017–2019	Austria Lustenau	40	(2)
2019–2020	SV Lafnitz	12	(1)
2020–2021	SGV Freiberg	10	(1)
2021	Cascavel CR	2	(0)
2021–2022	Burgan		
2022–	FC Dornbirn	50	(0)
- * Club domestic league appearances and goals as of 26 May 2024

Willian Rodrigues de Freitas, known as Willian Rodrigues (born 9 September 1993) is a Brazilian professional footballer who plays as a defensive midfielder for Austrian Second League club FC Dornbirn.

== Club career ==
He made his Austrian Football First League debut for SC Austria Lustenau on 21 July 2017 in a game against Floridsdorfer AC.

On 14 July 2022, Willian joined Austrian Second League club FC Dornbirn from Kuwaiti club Burgan.
