= FC Hertha Wels =

Austrian football club, based in Wels

FC Wels
- Full name: Fussball Club Wels
- Founded: 2003; 23 years ago
- Ground: HUBER Arena Wels
- Capacity: 3,000
- Chairman: Silvia Huber
- Manager: Yahya Genc
- League: 2. Liga
- 2025-26: 2. Liga, 10th of 16
Home colours	Away colours

FC Hertha Wels is an Austrian association football club from Wels that currently plays in the second-tier 2. Liga. The club was founded in 2024 by the merger of WSC Hertha Wels and FC Wels, both of them also being fusion clubs of two predecessor clubs each.

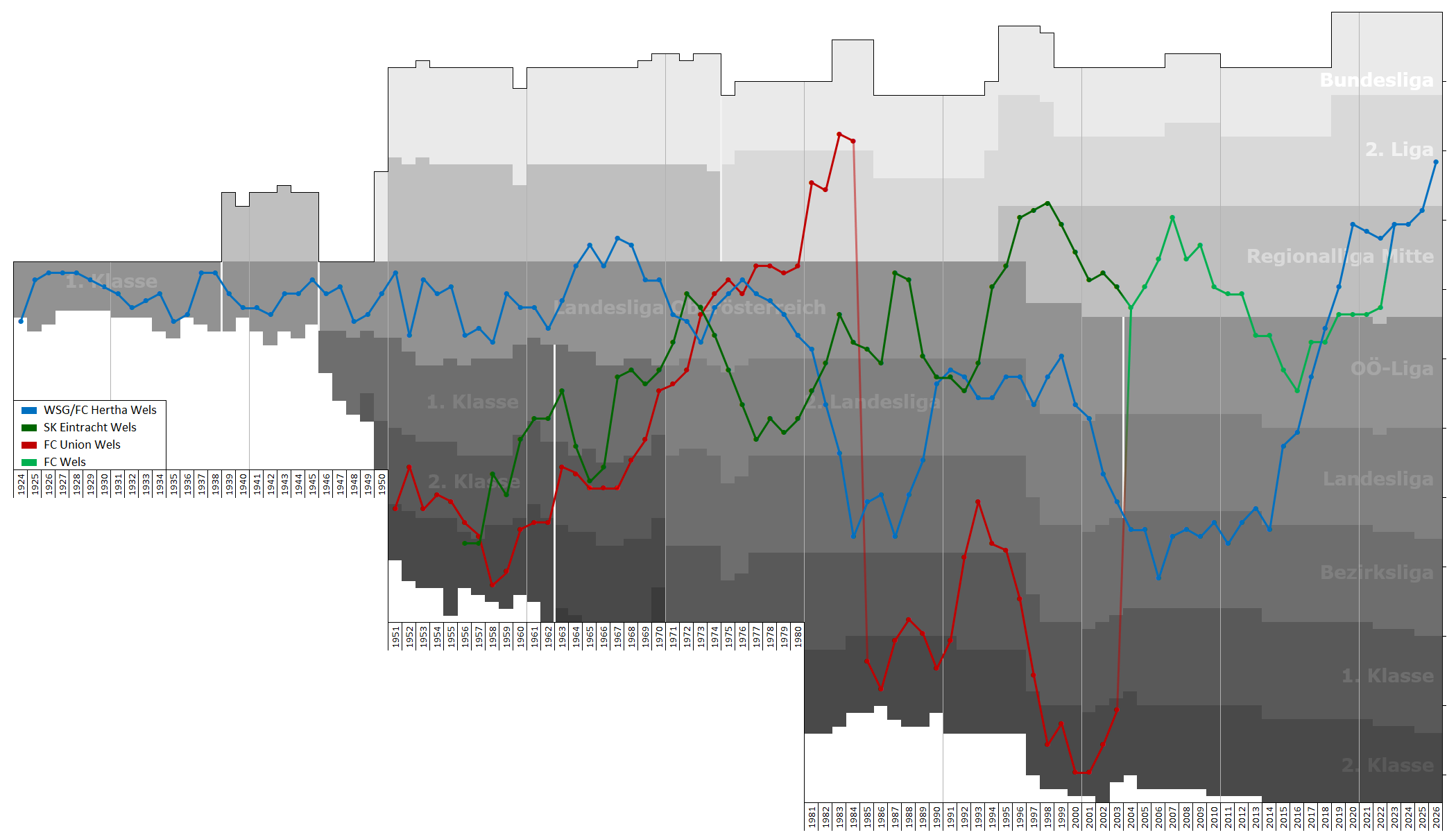
Historical chart of the club and its predecessors' league performance

== History ==
Welser SC (WSC) Welser SC (WSC) was founded in 1912.

== Current squad ==
As of 23 September 2026

Note: Flags indicate national team as defined under FIFA eligibility rules; some limited exceptions apply. Players may hold more than one non-FIFA nationality.

No.	Pos.	Nation	Player
3	DF	CRO	Filip Glibušić
4	DF	AUT	Sebastian Feyrer
5	DF	GER	Nicolas Keckeisen
6	MF	AUT	Pascal Müller
7	FW	SVK	Marek Švec
8	MF	GAM	Kebba Camara
9	FW	ESP	Isa Drammeh
10	MF	AUT	Tolgahan Sahin
11	MF	AUT	Yasin Mankan
12	FW	AUT	Michael Brugger
13	DF	AUT	Manuel Thurnwald
14	DF	AUT	Luca Tischler
18	FW	TUR	Samet Çeri
19	FW	AUT	Jakob Wanker (on loan from Juniors OÖ)

No.	Pos.	Nation	Player
20	MF	GER	Sebastian Malinowski
21	DF	AUT	Felix Schneitler
22	MF	SLO	Oliver Kregar
23	DF	AUT	Stefan Haudum
24	MF	AUT	Christopher Wernitznig
27	MF	AUT	Tobesch Rahimi
28	DF	AUT	Paul Gobara
29	MF	AUT	Nevio Zotz (on loan from Ried)
31	GK	GER	Christian Lapsin
33	GK	AUT	Moritz Schrenk
40	MF	AUT	Nikolas Freund
44	GK	AUT	Kilian Schröcker
77	MF	AUT	Din Barlov

== Staff and board members ==
- Trainer: (Austria) Hans-Peter Buchleitner
- Co-Trainer: (Austria) Gerald Baumgartner
- Physio: (Austria) Ernst Leutgöb
- President: (Austria) Silvia Huber
- Vice President: (Austria) Peter Koits
- Vice Chairman: (Austria) Johann Mutschlechner
