= List of Austrian football transfers summer 2023 =

This is a list of Austrian football transfers for the 2023 summer transfer window. Only transfers featuring Austrian Football Bundesliga are listed.

== Austrian Football Bundesliga ==
Note: Flags indicate national team as has been defined under FIFA eligibility rules. Players may hold more than one non-FIFA nationality.

=== Red Bull Salzburg ===
In:

No.	Pos.	Nation	Player
3	DF	SRB	Aleksa Terzić (from (Italy) Fiorentina)
18	MF	DEN	Mads Bidstrup (from (England) Brentford, previously on loan at (Denmark) Nordsjælland)
21	FW	SRB	Petar Ratkov (from (Serbia) TSC)
24	GK	AUT	Alexander Schlager (from LASK)
39	DF	GER	Leandro Morgalla (from (Germany) 1860 Munich)
—	DF	SWE	John Mellberg (from (Sweden) Brommapojkarna)
—	DF	BRA	Douglas Mendes (from (Brazil) Red Bull Bragantino, previously on loan at Liefering)
—	MF	GER	Elione Fernandes Neto (from (Germany) Fortuna Düsseldorf)
—	FW	ITA	Nicolò Turco (from (Italy) Juventus Youth Sector)

Out:

No.	Pos.	Nation	Player
2	DF	BEL	Ignace Van Der Brempt (on loan to (Germany) Hamburger SV)
5	DF	CMR	Jérôme Onguéné (loan return to (Germany) Eintracht Frankfurt)
9	FW	AUT	Junior Adamu (to (Germany) SC Freiburg)
13	MF	AUT	Nicolas Seiwald (to (Germany) RB Leipzig)
18	GK	SUI	Philipp Köhn (to (France) Monaco)
24	DF	AUT	Lukas Ibertsberger (on loan to Wolfsberger AC)
30	FW	SLO	Benjamin Šeško (to (Germany) RB Leipzig)
33	GK	GER	Alexander Walke (retired)
35	MF	GHA	Lawrence Agyekum (on loan to Liefering)
40	GK	CZE	Adam Stejskal (to WSG Tirol)
44	MF	NGR	Samson Tijani (on loan to Wolfsberger AC)
77	FW	SUI	Noah Okafor (to (Italy) Milan)
95	DF	BRA	Bernardo (to (Germany) VfL Bochum)
—	DF	SWE	John Mellberg (on loan to Liefering)
—	DF	BRA	Douglas Mendes (on loan to Liefering)
—	MF	GER	Elione Fernandes Neto (on loan to Liefering)
—	MF	AUT	Raphael Hofer (on loan to Blau-Weiß Linz)
—	FW	ITA	Nicolò Turco (on loan to Liefering)
—	DF	GER	Kilian Ludewig (on loan to (Germany) 1860 Munich, previously on loan at (Denmark) AaB)
—	MF	MLI	Mamadou Sangare (reloan to Hartberg)
—	FW	GHA	Daniel Owusu (on loan to SKU Amstetten, previously on loan at First Vienna)
—	MF	FRA	Antoine Bernède (to (Switzerland) Lausanne, previously on loan)
—	FW	CIV	Oumar Diakité (to (France) Stade Reims, previously on loan at Liefering)

=== Sturm Graz ===
In:

No.	Pos.	Nation	Player
1	GK	NED	Kjell Scherpen (on loan from (England) Brighton, previously on loan at (Netherlands) Vitesse)
2	DF	SCO	Max Johnston (from (Scotland) Motherwell)
6	DF	AUT	Aleksandar Borković (from (Germany) Hoffenheim II, previously on loan)
9	FW	POL	Szymon Włodarczyk (from (Poland) Górnik Zabrze)
14	MF	ESP	Javi Serrano (on loan from (Spain) Atlético Madrid, previously on loan at (Spain) Ibiza)
20	FW	NOR	Seedy Jatta (from (Norway) Vålerenga)
27	DF	AUT	Gabriel Haider (from (Germany) Hoffenheim II)
40	GK	AUT	Matteo Bignetti (from (Germany) Eintracht Frankfurt II)

Out:

No.	Pos.	Nation	Player
1	GK	ENG	Arthur Okonkwo (loan return to (England) Arsenal)
9	FW	SUI	Albian Ajeti (loan return to (Scotland) Celtic)
14	DF	AUT	Paul Komposch (to Hartberg)
16	MF	AUT	Sandro Schendl (to SV Ried)
20	FW	NED	Emanuel Emegha (to (France) Strasbourg)
24	DF	AUT	Sandro Ingolitsch (to SCR Altach)
27	GK	AUT	Jörg Siebenhandl (to LASK)
30	MF	AUT	Ivan Ljubic (to LASK)
32	GK	AUT	Tobias Schützenauer (to SCR Altach)
37	MF	AUT	Moritz Wels (to Austria Wien)
—	FW	AUT	Luca Kronberger (on loan to WSG Tirol, previously on loan at SV Ried)
—	FW	AUT	Christoph Lang (on loan to Hartberg, previously on loan at SV Ried)
—	FW	AUT	Dardan Shabanhaxhaj (to (Slovenia) Mura, previously on loan)

=== LASK ===
In:

No.	Pos.	Nation	Player
2	DF	USA	George Bello (from (Germany) Arminia Bielefeld)
4	DF	UKR	Maksym Talovyerov (reloan from (Czech Republic) Slavia Prague)
11	FW	SEN	Moussa Koné (from (France) Nîmes)
16	DF	PAN	Andrés Andrade (from (Germany) Arminia Bielefeld)
19	FW	FRA	Lenny Pintor (from (France) Saint-Étienne)
21	MF	AUT	Ivan Ljubic (from Sturm Graz)
24	FW	AUT	Elias Havel (from Liefering)
25	DF	GER	Sanoussy Ba (on loan from (Germany) RB Leipzig)
28	GK	AUT	Jörg Siebenhandl (from Sturm Graz)
55	MF	GAM	Ebrima Darboe (on loan from (Italy) Roma)

Out:

No.	Pos.	Nation	Player
1	GK	AUT	Alexander Schlager (to Red Bull Salzburg)
19	DF	AUT	Marvin Potzmann (to Austria Wien)
34	DF	GER	Jan Boller (free agent)
36	GK	AUT	Thomas Gebauer (retired)
38	FW	JPN	Keito Nakamura (to (France) Stade Reims)
41	DF	AUT	Luca Wimhofer (on loan to SV Horn)
43	MF	AUT	Nemanja Čelić (loan return to (Germany) Darmstadt 98)
—	GK	AUT	Nikolas Polster (on loan to SV Horn, previously on loan at Vorwärts Steyr)
—	MF	AUT	Marco Sulzner (on loan to SKU Amstetten, previously on loan at First Vienna)
—	DF	CIV	Oumar Sako (to (Bulgaria) Arda Kardzhali, previously on loan)
—	FW	AUT	Thomas Sabitzer (to Wolfsberger AC, previously on loan at WSG Tirol)
—	FW	AUT	Marcel Monsberger (to SKU Amstetten, previously on loan at Floridsdorfer AC)
—	FW	GRE	Efthymis Koulouris (to (Poland) Pogoń Szczecin, previously on loan at (Turkey) Alanyaspor)

=== Rapid Wien ===
In:

No.	Pos.	Nation	Player
8	MF	AUT	Lukas Grgić (from (Croatia) Hajduk Split)
17	FW	FRA	Fally Mayulu (from Blau-Weiß Linz)
18	MF	AUT	Matthias Seidl (from Blau-Weiß Linz)
24	MF	GER	Dennis Kaygin (from (Germany) Mainz 05 youth)
55	DF	SRB	Nenad Cvetković (from (Israel) Ashdod)

Out:

No.	Pos.	Nation	Player
2	DF	NED	Denso Kasius (loan return to (Italy) Bologna)
6	DF	AUT	Kevin Wimmer (to (Slovakia) Slovan Bratislava)
8	MF	AUT	Christoph Knasmüllner (free agent)
16	MF	SLO	Dejan Petrovič (to (Croatia) Rijeka)
33	DF	AUT	Marko Dijakovic (to (Poland) GKS Tychy)
37	DF	AUT	Pascal Fallmann (on loan to (Germany) Freiburg II)
38	FW	NED	Ferdy Druijf (on loan to (Netherlands) PEC Zwolle)
41	FW	AUT	Bernhard Zimmermann (on loan to Wolfsberger AC)
42	MF	AUT	Lion Schuster (to (Germany) SV Sandhausen)
77	FW	SRB	Dragoljub Savić (to (Latvia) RFS)
—	FW	AUT	René Kriwak (to (Netherlands) Dordrecht, previously on loan at Hartberg)

=== Austria Wien ===
In:

No.	Pos.	Nation	Player
19	DF	AUT	Marvin Potzmann (from LASK)
21	DF	FRA	Hakim Guenouche (from Austria Lustenau)
24	DF	CRO	Tin Plavotić (from SV Ried)
26	MF	AUT	Reinhold Ranftl (from (Germany) Schalke 04, previously on loan)
33	FW	AUT	Alexander Schmidt (from (Portugal) Vizela)
37	MF	AUT	Moritz Wels (from Sturm Graz)
60	FW	TOG	Silva Kani (from (Israel) Bnei Yehuda)
—	DF	AUT	Tobias Polz (from ASV Draßburg)

Out:

No.	Pos.	Nation	Player
7	FW	AUT	Can Keles (on loan to (Turkey) Fatih Karagümrük)
10	FW	AUT	Nikola Dovedan (to (Germany) 1. FC Heidenheim)
16	DF	ISR	Doron Leidner (loan return to (Greece) Olympiacos)
20	DF	GER	Lukas Mühl (to (Italy) Spezia)
25	FW	BIH	Haris Tabaković (to (Germany) Hertha BSC)
39	DF	AUT	Georg Teigl (to Admira Wacker)
43	MF	AUT	Armand Smrcka (to Floridsdorfer AC)
44	FW	SEN	Ibrahima Dramé (to (Turkey) Bandırmaspor)
—	DF	AUT	Tobias Polz (on loan to SV Stripfing)

=== Austria Klagenfurt ===
In:

No.	Pos.	Nation	Player
16	MF	GER	Iba May (from (Germany) Viktoria Berlin)
77	FW	AUT	Aaron Sky Schwarz (on loan from Rapid Wien II)

Out:

No.	Pos.	Nation	Player
5	DF	AUT	Michael Blauensteiner (free agent)
6	DF	URU	Maximiliano Moreira (to (Greece) Panserraikos)
12	MF	NGR	Daniel Francis (loan return to (Germany) Bayern Munich II)
18	MF	GER	Moritz Berg (on loan to (Germany) Viktoria Berlin)
21	MF	AUT	Vesel Demaku (loan return to Sturm Graz)
23	MF	AUT	Florian Rieder (to Wolfsberger AC)
26	FW	CAN	Matthew Durrans (free agent)
28	MF	AUT	Emilian Metu (loan return to (Germany) Bayern Munich II)
35	MF	GER	Alexander Fuchs (to (Germany) SV Sandhausen)
70	MF	AUT	Fabian Miesenböck (free agent)
—	FW	AUT	Patrick Hasenhüttl (to (Germany) Hallescher FC, previously on loan at (Germany) VfB Oldenburg)

=== Wolfsberger AC ===
In:

No.	Pos.	Nation	Player
4	DF	CAN	Scott Kennedy (from (Germany) Jahn Regensburg)
6	MF	NGR	Samson Tijani (on loan from Red Bull Salzburg)
9	FW	AUT	Bernhard Zimmermann (on loan from Rapid Wien)
10	FW	AUT	Thomas Sabitzer (from LASK, previously on loan at WSG Tirol)
12	FW	CIV	Mohamed Bamba (from (Israel) Hapoel Rishon LeZion)
19	MF	GEO	Sandro Altunashvili (from (Georgia (country)) Dinamo Batumi)
23	MF	AUT	Florian Rieder (from Austria Klagenfurt)
26	DF	AUT	Lukas Ibertsberger (on loan from Red Bull Salzburg)

Out:

No.	Pos.	Nation	Player
4	DF	AUT	David Gugganig (to WSG Tirol)
5	DF	GER	Tim Oermann (loan return to (Germany) VfL Bochum)
11	FW	ISR	Tai Baribo (to (United States) Philadelphia Union)
12	DF	ITA	Matteo Anzolin (to (Italy) Triestina)
24	DF	AUT	Raphael Schifferl (on loan to (Germany) SpVgg Unterhaching)
25	DF	AUT	Fabian Tauchhammer (free agent)
30	MF	AUT	Matthäus Taferner (to WSG Tirol)
77	FW	GER	Maurice Malone (loan return to (Germany) FC Augsburg)
—	FW	GRE	Nikos Vergos (to (Greece) Atromitos, previously on loan at (Greece) Lamia)
—	FW	CRO	Dario Vizinger (to (Poland) Warta Poznań, previously on loan at (Germany) Jahn Regensburg)

=== Austria Lustenau ===
In:

No.	Pos.	Nation	Player
2	DF	MTQ	Boris Moltenis (from (Poland) Wisła Kraków)
5	DF	AUT	Leo Mätzler (from SCR Altach, previously on loan at Dornbirn)
11	DF	SEN	Baïla Diallo (on loan from (France) Clermont)
15	FW	AUT	Namory Cissé (from (Netherlands) Fortuna Sittard youth)
19	FW	GER	Ben Bobzien (on loan from (Germany) Mainz 05, previously on loan at (Germany) SV Elversberg)
30	MF	BRA	Rafael Devisate (from (Brazil) Atlético Mineiro youth)

Out:

No.	Pos.	Nation	Player
5	DF	FRA	Jean Hugonet (to (Germany) 1. FC Magdeburg)
11	FW	CMR	Michael Cheukoua (to GAK)
12	DF	FRA	Hakim Guenouche (to Austria Wien)
19	MF	AUT	Angelo Bacic (to Hohenems)
35	DF	BRA	Adriel (to SW Bregenz)
44	DF	AUT	Hannes Küng (to Wiener SC)
—	FW	AUT	Jan Stefanon (to GAK, previously on loan at Dornbirn)

=== WSG Tirol ===
In:

No.	Pos.	Nation	Player
3	DF	AUT	David Gugganig (from Wolfsberger AC)
7	FW	AUT	Luca Kronberger (on loan from Sturm Graz, previously on loan at SV Ried)
8	FW	MLI	Mahamadou Diarra (from (Mali) Stade Malien)
9	FW	SLO	Nik Prelec (on loan from (Italy) Cagliari)
11	FW	POL	Aleksander Buksa (on loan from (Italy) Genoa, previously on loan at (Belgium) SL16)
30	MF	AUT	Matthäus Taferner (from Wolfsberger AC)
40	GK	CZE	Adam Stejskal (from Red Bull Salzburg)

Out:

No.	Pos.	Nation	Player
7	FW	AUT	Thomas Sabitzer (loan return to LASK)
8	MF	AUT	Kilian Bauernfeind (to SV Horn)
11	FW	ARG	Lautaro Rinaldi (free agent)
21	MF	SLO	Žan Rogelj (to (Belgium) Charleroi)
22	MF	AUT	Florian Tipotsch (to SC Schwaz)
30	DF	AUT	Raffael Behounek (to (Netherlands) Willem II)
33	FW	SWE	Tim Prica (loan return to (Denmark) AaB)
35	GK	ITA	Simon Beccari (free agent)

=== Hartberg ===
In:

No.	Pos.	Nation	Player
3	DF	GER	Angelo Brückner (on loan from (Germany) Bayern Munich II)
5	DF	SCO	Ibane Bowat (on loan from (England) Fulham, previously on loan at (Netherlands) Den Bosch)
8	MF	AUT	Christoph Urdl (from Deutschlandsberger SC)
10	FW	KOS	Donis Avdijaj (from (Switzerland) Zürich, previously on loan)
11	FW	AUT	Maximilian Entrup (from Marchfeld)
14	DF	AUT	Paul Komposch (from Sturm Graz)
18	DF	AUT	Sam Schutti (from St. Pölten)
26	FW	AUT	Christoph Lang (on loan from Sturm Graz, previously on loan at SV Ried)
27	MF	AUT	Dominik Prokop (from (Croatia) Gorica, previously on loan)
37	MF	AUT	Maximilian Fillafer (from Spittal/Drau)
39	GK	AUT	Tobias Knoflach (free agent)
45	MF	MLI	Mamadou Sangare (reloan from Red Bull Salzburg)
70	FW	FRA	Ruben Providence (from (Italy) Roma, previously on loan)
77	MF	AUT	Lind Hajdari (from AKA Burgenland)
95	DF	AUT	Damjan Kovacevic (from AKA Vorarlberg)

Out:

No.	Pos.	Nation	Player
6	MF	AUT	Philipp Erhardt (to ASV Draßburg)
8	MF	AUT	Lukas Fadinger (to SCR Altach)
11	MF	CRO	Matija Horvat (to DSV Leoben)
14	DF	AUT	Christian Klem (free agent)
16	DF	AUT	Mario Sonnleitner (free agent)
18	MF	AUT	Philipp Sturm (to Siezenheim)
24	FW	AUT	Dario Tadić (to St. Pölten)
26	FW	AUT	Jakob Kolb (to Vorwärts Steyr)
29	DF	AUT	Patrick Farkas (to SV Oberwart)
39	FW	AUT	René Kriwak (loan return to Rapid Wien)
77	DF	AUT	Marcel Schantl (to Blau-Weiß Linz)
—	FW	AUT	Jakob Knollmüller (to SV Lafnitz, previously on loan)
—	FW	ROU	Patrick Ioan Gânțe (to SV Lafnitz, previously on loan)

=== SCR Altach ===
In:

No.	Pos.	Nation	Player
1	GK	AUT	Dejan Stojanović (from (Germany) Jahn Regensburg)
6	DF	AUT	Constantin Reiner (on loan from (Poland) Piast Gliwice)
12	DF	AUT	Leonardo Lukačević (from Admira Wacker)
13	MF	CMR	Djawal Kaiba (from (Cameroon) Coton Sport)
15	DF	AUT	Paul Koller (from Grazer AK)
20	FW	BRA	Gustavo (from Dornbirn)
25	DF	AUT	Sandro Ingolitsch (from Sturm Graz)
27	MF	AUT	Christian Gebauer (from (Germany) Arminia Bielefeld)
30	MF	AUT	Lukas Fadinger (from Hartberg)
31	GK	AUT	Alexander Eckmayr (from SPG Wels)
32	GK	AUT	Tobias Schützenauer (from Sturm Graz)
33	GK	AUT	Paul Piffer (from AKA Vorarlberg)

Out:

No.	Pos.	Nation	Player
1	GK	DEN	Andreas Jungdal (loan return to (Italy) Milan)
3	DF	AUT	Simon Nelson (free agent)
6	DF	FRA	Pape-Alioune Ndiaye (to (Turkey) Şanlıurfaspor)
12	FW	SRB	Marko Lazetić (loan return to (Italy) Milan)
13	GK	AUT	Tino Casali (to (Germany) Eintracht Braunschweig)
14	DF	AUT	Samuel Mischitz (on loan to Dornbirn)
15	FW	AUT	Husein Balić (loan return to LASK)
16	DF	AUT	Emanuel Schreiner (to Weißkirchen)
20	MF	AUT	Johannes Tartarotti (free agent)
24	MF	CRO	Jurica Jurčec (to (Italy) Crotone)
27	MF	AUT	Stefan Haudum (to Blau-Weiß Linz)
30	DF	GER	David Herold (loan return to (Germany) Bayern Munich II)
32	GK	AUT	Jakob Odehnal (on loan to Dornbirn)
34	DF	AUT	Manuel Thurnwald (free agent)
—	DF	AUT	Leo Mätzler (to Austria Lustenau, previously on loan at Dornbirn)
—	MF	AUT	Noah Bitsche (to Dornbirn, previously on loan at Vorwärts Steyr)
—	MF	AUT	Lukas Parger (to SW Bregenz, previously on loan at Dornbirn)

=== Blau-Weiß Linz ===
In:

No.	Pos.	Nation	Player
3	DF	AUT	Erwin Softić (from Juniors OÖ)
7	MF	IRL	Conor Noß (from (Germany) Borussia Mönchengladbach)
11	MF	AUT	Raphael Hofer (on loan from Red Bull Salzburg)
12	GK	AUT	Andreas Lukse (from First Vienna)
17	DF	AUT	Alem Pašić (from Vorwärts Steyr)
18	FW	AUT	Stefan Feiertag (from SKU Amstetten)
27	MF	AUT	Stefan Haudum (from SCR Altach)
28	DF	AUT	Marcel Schantl (from Hartberg)
29	FW	GER	Mehmet Ibrahimi (from (Germany) RB Leipzig, previously on loan at (Germany) Eintracht Braunschweig)
30	MF	AUT	Kristijan Dobras (from (Liechtenstein) Vaduz)

Out:

No.	Pos.	Nation	Player
11	FW	FRA	Fally Mayulu (to Rapid Wien)
18	MF	AUT	Matthias Seidl (to Rapid Wien)

== See also ==
- 2023–24 Austrian Football Bundesliga
