= 2021–22 SK Austria Klagenfurt (2007) season =

SK Austria Klagenfurt
2021–22 season
- Chairman: Peter Svetits
- Manager: Robert Micheu
- Stadium: Wörthersee Stadion
- Austrian Football Bundesliga: 4th
- Austrian Cup: Third round
Home colours	Away colours

The 2021–22 season is the 91st season in the existence of SK Austria Klagenfurt and the club's tenth consecutive season in the top flight of Austrian football. In addition to the domestic league, SK Austria Klagenfurt are participating in this season's edition of the Austrian Cup.

== Players ==
=== First-team squad ===
As of 5 February 2022

Note: Flags indicate national team as defined under FIFA eligibility rules; some limited exceptions apply. Players may hold more than one non-FIFA nationality.

No.	Pos.	Nation	Player
1	GK	GER	Lennart Moser (on loan from Union Berlin)
3	MF	USA	Thomas Roberts (on loan from FC Dallas)
4	MF	AUT	Patrick Greil
5	DF	AUT	Michael Blauensteiner
6	DF	URU	Maximiliano Moreira
7	MF	AUT	Florian Jaritz
8	DF	GRE	Kosmas Gezos
9	FW	BIH	Darijo Pecirep
10	MF	GER	Julian von Haacke
11	MF	SLO	Rajko Rep
12	FW	SWE	Alex Timossi Andersson (on loan from Bayern Munich II)
13	GK	GER	Phillip Menzel
14	MF	AUT	Christopher Cvetko
18	MF	GER	Alexander Fuchs
19	FW	GER	Luca Grillemeier
20	MF	GER	Tim Maciejewski (on loan from Union Berlin)
21	GK	AUT	Marcel Köstenbauer

No.	Pos.	Nation	Player
22	FW	AUT	Patrick Hasenhüttl
23	MF	AUT	Florian Rieder
27	MF	AUT	Florian Freissegger
28	DF	GER	Herbert Paul
29	GK	CHN	Liu Shaoziyang (on loan from Bayern Munich II)
30	GK	AUT	David Puntigam
31	DF	AUT	Thorsten Mahrer
32	FW	AUT	Markus Pink
33	DF	GER	Till Schumacher
37	DF	AUT	Nicolas Wimmer
47	DF	AUT	Hubert Griesebner
63	DF	CRO	Ivan Šaravanja
70	MF	AUT	Fabian Miesenböck
71	FW	BIH	Benjamin Hadžić
77	FW	CAN	Gloire Amanda
80	FW	AUT	Lukas Fridrikas
81	MF	TUR	Turgay Gemicibaşi

==== Out on loan ====
Note: Flags indicate national team as defined under FIFA eligibility rules; some limited exceptions apply. Players may hold more than one non-FIFA nationality.

No.	Pos.	Nation	Player
—	MF	AUT	Fabio Markelić (at Wacker Innsbruck)

== Pre-season and friendlies ==
Win Draw Loss Fixtures

== Competitions ==
=== Overall record ===
Competition	First match	Last match	Starting round	Final position	Record							
Competition	First match	Last match	Starting round	Final position	Pld	W	D	L	GF	GA	GD	Win %
Austrian Football Bundesliga	25 July 2021	May 2022	Matchday 1		18	6	7	5	26	27	−1	33.33
Austrian Cup	17 July 2021	26 October 2021	First round	Third round	3	2	0	1	8	6	+2	66.67
Total					21	8	7	6	34	33	+1	38.10

Last updated: 12 December 2021
Source: Soccerway

=== Austrian Football Bundesliga ===
==== League table ====
Austrian Bundesliga regular season table
Pos	Team	Pld	W	D	L	GF	GA	GD	Pts	Qualification
4	Austria Wien	22	8	9	5	31	23	+8	33	Qualification for the Championship round
5	Rapid Wien	22	8	7	7	35	31	+4	31	Qualification for the Championship round
6	Austria Klagenfurt	22	7	9	6	31	33	−2	30	Qualification for the Championship round
7	Ried	22	7	8	7	31	41	−10	29	Qualification for the Relegation round
8	LASK	22	6	7	9	28	29	−1	25	Qualification for the Relegation round

Source: Austrian Football Bundesliga
Rules for classification: 1) Points; 2) Head-to-head record; 3) Goal difference; 4) Goals scored; 5) Matches won; 6) Away matches won; 7) Away goals scored.

Pos	Team	Pld	W	D	L	GF	GA	GD	Pts	Qualification	RBS	STU	AWI	WOL	RWI	KLA
2	Sturm Graz	32	16	8	8	62	46	+16	37	Qualification for the Champions League third qualifying round	2–1	—	1–0	1–4	2–1	3–1
3	Austria Wien	32	11	13	8	44	39	+5	29	Qualification for the Europa League play-off round	1–2	4–2	—	2–1	1–1	1–1
4	Wolfsberger AC	32	14	5	13	48	53	−5	28	Qualification for the Europa Conference League third qualifying round	1–4	0–2	1–1	—	2–1	1–2
5	Rapid Wien (O)	32	10	11	11	48	45	+3	25	Qualification for the Europa Conference League play-offs	0–1	1–1	1–1	2–1	—	2–2
6	Austria Klagenfurt	32	8	12	12	43	57	−14	21		0–6	1–2	1–2	2–3	1–3	—

Legend: Blue = home team win; Yellow = draw; Red = away team win.
Rules for classification: 1) Points; 2) Points with (possible) half points subtracted due to rounding; 3) Head-to-head points; 4) Head-to-head goal difference; 5) Head-to-head goals scored; 6) Head-to-head away goals scored; 7) Goal difference; 8) Goals scored; 9) Matches won; 10) Away matches won; 11) Away goals scored.
(O) Play-off winners

Austrian Bundesliga relegation round table
Pos	Team	Pld	W	D	L	GF	GA	GD	Pts	Qualification	WAT	LIN	ALT	RIE	HAR	ADM
1	WSG Tirol	32	10	10	12	46	58	−12	28	Qualification for the Europa Conference League play-offs	—	4–0	0–3	2–0	4–2	0–0
2	LASK	32	9	12	11	44	42	+2	26	Qualification for the Europa Conference League play-offs	6–0	—	2–1	0–2	3–3	3–1
3	Rheindorf Altach	32	7	8	17	24	49	−25	22		2–1	0–0	—	1–1	0–0	2–2
4	Ried	32	8	13	11	40	54	−14	22		2–3	1–1	1–2	—	0–0	1–1
5	Hartberg	32	7	12	13	43	47	−4	22		0–1	0–0	4–0	1–1	—	1–2
6	Admira Wacker Mödling (R)	32	6	13	13	36	46	−10	21	Relegation to Austrian Football Second League	1–1	1–1	0–3	2–0	1–3	—

Source: Austrian Bundesliga
Legend: Blue = home team win; Yellow = draw; Red = away team win.
Rules for classification: 1) Points; 2) Points with (possible) half points subtracted due to rounding; 3) Head-to-head points; 4) Head-to-head goal difference; 5) Head-to-head goals scored; 6) Head-to-head away goals scored; 7) Goal difference; 8) Goals scored; 9) Matches won; 10) Away matches won; 11) Away goals scored.
(R) Relegated

==== Results summary ====
Overall								Home						Away					
Pld	W	D	L	GF	GA	GD	Pts	W	D	L	GF	GA	GD	W	D	L	GF	GA	GD
4	0	2	2	4	10	−6	2	0	1	1	3	6	−3	0	1	1	1	4	−3

Last updated: 14 August 2021.
Source: Austrian Football Bundesliga

==== Results by round ====
Round	1	2	3	4
Ground	A	H	A	H
Result				
Position				

Updated to match(es) played on 14 August 2021. Source: Austrian Football Bundesliga
A = Away; H = Home; W = Win; D = Draw; L = Loss

==== Matches ====
The league fixtures were announced on 22 June 2021.

25 July 2021 1	Austria Klagenfurt	1–1	Wolfsberger AC	Klagenfurt
17:00 CEST (UTC+2)				Stadium: Wörthersee Stadion

21 August 2021 5	Red Bull Salzburg	3–1	Austria Klagenfurt	Wals-Siezenheim
17:00 CEST (UTC+2)	Adeyemi 3'; Capaldo (yellow card) 47'; Berisha 70'; Kristensen 84'	Report	Andersson 14'; Gemicibasi (yellow card) 18'; Mahrer (yellow card) 52'; Pink (yellow card) 69'; Wimmer (yellow card) 73'	Stadium: Stadion Wals-Siezenheim; Attendance: 11,826; Referee: Julian Weinberger

16 October 2021 11	Austria Klagenfurt	1–1	Rapid Wien	Klagenfurt
17:00 CEST (UTC+2)	Mahrer (red card) 21'; Amanda 87'	Report	Fountas 37'	Stadium: Wörthersee Stadion; Attendance: 7,493; Referee: Rene Eisner

27 November 2021 16	Austria Klagenfurt	2–1	Red Bull Salzburg	Klagenfurt
17:00 CET (UTC+1)	Gemicibaşi 30', (yellow card) 36'; Schumacher (yellow card) 58'; Pink 80'; Paul (yellow card) 90+5'	Report	Camara (yellow card) 89'; Kristensen 90+1'	Stadium: Wörthersee Stadion; Attendance: 0 Referee: Gerhard Grobelnik

5 March 2022 22	Rapid Wien	v	Austria Klagenfurt	Vienna
17:00 CET (UTC+1)				Stadium: Allianz Stadium

=== Austrian Cup ===
17 July 2021 First round	Wiener Neustadt	1–5	Austria Klagenfurt	Wiener Neustadt
19:00 CEST (UTC+2)	Marc Dominkus 3'; Toni Harrer (yellow card) 51'	Report	Greil 13' 27'; Pink 67'; Cvetko 80'; Darijo Pecirep 90+1' (pen.)	Stadium: Stadion Wiener Neustadt; Attendance: 755; Referee: Markus Hameter

22 September 2021 Second round	TSV St. Johann	1–2	Austria Klagenfurt	Klagenfurt
18:00 CEST (UTC+2)	Ellmer 53' (pen.)	Report	Hütter 77'; Pink 90+2'	Stadium: Wörthersee Stadion; Attendance: 500; Referee: Rene Eisner

26 October 2021 Third round	Austria Klagenfurt	1–4 (a.e.t.)	SC Weiz	Klagenfurt
14:30 CEST (UTC+2)	Hasenhütl 50'	Report	Greil 5', 105+1'; Pecirep 97', 112'	Stadium: Wörthersee Stadion; Attendance: 900; Referee: Gabriel Gmeiner
