= 2022–23 SK Austria Klagenfurt (2007) season =

SK Austria Klagenfurt
2022–23 season
- President: Herbert Matschek
- Manager: Peter Pacult
- Stadium: Wörthersee Stadion
- Austrian Football Bundesliga: 6th
- Austrian Cup: Quarter-finals
- Top goalscorer: League: Markus Pink (12); All: Markus Pink (13)

The 2022–23 season was the 103rd in the history of SK Austria Klagenfurt and their second consecutive season in the top flight. The club participated in the Austrian Football Bundesliga and the Austrian Cup.

== Players ==
=== First team squad ===
As of 27 January 2023

Note: Flags indicate national team as defined under FIFA eligibility rules; some limited exceptions apply. Players may hold more than one non-FIFA nationality.

No.	Pos.	Nation	Player
1	GK	AUT	Marco Knaller
2	DF	NED	Solomon Bonnah
5	DF	AUT	Michael Blauensteiner
6	DF	URU	Maximiliano Moreira
7	MF	AUT	Florian Jaritz
8	DF	GRE	Kosmas Gezos
9	MF	GER	Sinan Karweina
11	FW	USA	Sebastian Soto
12	MF	NGR	Daniel Francis (on loan from Bayern Munich II)
13	GK	GER	Phillip Menzel
14	MF	AUT	Christopher Cvetko
17	DF	ITA	Simon Straudi
18	MF	GER	Moritz Berg
19	MF	SCO	Andy Irving
20	MF	GER	Rico Benatelli

No.	Pos.	Nation	Player
21	MF	AUT	Vesel Demaku (on loan from Sturm Graz)
23	MF	AUT	Florian Rieder
24	MF	AUT	Christopher Wernitznig
26	FW	CAN	Matthew Durrans
28	MF	AUT	Emilian Metu (on loan from Bayern Munich II)
29	GK	CHN	Liu Shaoziyang (on loan from Bayern Munich U19)
30	GK	AUT	David Puntigam
31	DF	AUT	Thorsten Mahrer
32	FW	AUT	Markus Pink
33	DF	GER	Till Schumacher
37	DF	AUT	Nicolas Wimmer
39	FW	GER	Jonas Arweiler
70	MF	AUT	Fabian Miesenböck
77	FW	CAN	Gloire Amanda
—	FW	AUT	Nicolas Binder

==== Out on loan ====
Note: Flags indicate national team as defined under FIFA eligibility rules; some limited exceptions apply. Players may hold more than one non-FIFA nationality.

No.	Pos.	Nation	Player
—	GK	AUT	Marcel Köstenbauer (at Viktoria Berlin until 30 June 2023)
—	DF	SRB	Nikola Đorić (at Šibenik until 30 June 2023)
—	MF	TUR	Turgay Gemicibaşi (at Kasımpaşa until 30 June 2023)

No.	Pos.	Nation	Player
—	MF	AUT	Fabio Markelic (at Viktoria Berlin until 30 June 2023)
—	FW	AUT	Patrick Hasenhüttl (at VfB Oldenburg until 30 June 2023)

== Pre-season and friendlies ==
Win Draw Loss

25 June 2022 Friendly	Austria Klagenfurt	1–4	(Croatia) Osijek	Feldkirchen in Kärnten
15:00 CEST (UTC+2)	Cvetko 31'		Brlek 8', 81'; Janjić (yellow card) 40'; Petković 62'; Topčagić 65'	Stadium: Modehaus NIMO-ARENA

2 July 2022 Friendly	Austria Klagenfurt	0–0	(Germany) Hansa Rostock	Seeboden
16:00 CEST (UTC+2)				Stadium: Sportarena Seeboden

18 July 2022 Friendly	Austria Klagenfurt	0–0	(England) Southampton	Klagenfurt
19:00 CEST (UTC+2)				Stadium: Wörthersee Stadion; Attendance: 3,150

23 September 2022 Friendly	Austria Klagenfurt	6–2	(Austria) Grazer AK	Sankt Michael im Lavanttal
17:30 CEST (UTC+2)		Report		Stadium: Stadion Sankt Michael im Lavanttal

19 November 2022 Friendly	Austria Klagenfurt	2–1	(Austria) Grazer AK	Klagenfurt
14:00 CET (UTC+1)		Report		Stadium: 28 Black Arena

20 November 2022 Friendly	Austria Klagenfurt	2–1	(Germany) 1860 Munich	Klagenfurt
16:00 CET (UTC+1)		Report		Stadium: 28 Black Arena

14 January 2023 Friendly	Austria Klagenfurt	12–1	(Austria) Völkermarkt	Klagenfurt
14:00 CET (UTC+1)		Report		Stadium: 28 Black Arena

18 January 2023 Friendly	Austria Klagenfurt	4–2	(Austria) Wolfsberger AC II	Klagenfurt
17:00 CET (UTC+1)		Report		Stadium: 28 Black Arena

18 January 2023 Friendly	Beltinci (Slovenia)	1–7	Austria Klagenfurt	Beltinci
17:00 CET (UTC+1)		Report		Stadium: Beltinci Sports Park

25 January 2023 Friendly	Aluminij (Slovenia)	0–4	Austria Klagenfurt	Beltinci
14:00 CET (UTC+1)				Stadium: Beltinci Sports Park

28 January 2023 Friendly	Austria Klagenfurt	3–1	(Austria) Treibach	Klagenfurt
14:00 CET (UTC+1)		Report		Stadium: 28 Black Arena

== Competitions ==
=== Overall record ===
Competition	First match	Last match	Starting round	Final position	Record							
Competition	First match	Last match	Starting round	Final position	Pld	W	D	L	GF	GA	GD	Win %
Austrian Football Bundesliga	23 July 2022	3 June 2023	Matchday 1	6th	32	11	5	16	45	63	−18	34.38
Austrian Cup	15 July 2022	5 February 2023	First round	Quarter-finals	4	3	0	1	15	3	+12	75.00
Total					36	14	5	17	60	66	−6	38.89

Source: Soccerway

=== Austrian Football Bundesliga ===
==== League table ====
Pos	Team	Pld	W	D	L	GF	GA	GD	Pts	Qualification
4	Rapid Wien	22	10	3	9	34	26	+8	33	Qualification for the Championship round
5	Austria Wien	22	10	5	7	37	31	+6	32 (Note: Austria Wien were deducted 3 points due to license violation.)	Qualification for the Championship round
6	Austria Klagenfurt	22	9	3	10	35	40	−5	30	Qualification for the Championship round
7	WSG Tirol	22	8	4	10	32	37	−5	28	Qualification for the Relegation round
8	Austria Lustenau	22	7	6	9	29	37	−8	27	Qualification for the Relegation round

Source: Austrian Football Bundesliga
Rules for classification: 1) Points; 2) Head-to-head record; 3) Goal difference; 4) Goals scored; 5) Matches won; 6) Away matches won; 7) Away goals scored.

==== Results summary ====
Overall								Home						Away					
Pld	W	D	L	GF	GA	GD	Pts	W	D	L	GF	GA	GD	W	D	L	GF	GA	GD
22	9	3	10	35	40	−5	30	4	1	6	13	17	−4	5	2	4	22	23	−1

Source: Austrian Football Bundesliga

==== Results by round ====
Round	1	2	3	4	5	6	7	8	9	10	11	12	13	14	15	16	17
Ground	A	H	A	H	A	H	A	H	A	A	H	H	A	H	A	H	A
Result	L	L	D	W	L	D	W	L	W	W	W	L	W	L	D	L	
Position	11	11	11	8	9	10	6	9	9	6	5	5	4	5	6	6	

Source: Austrian Football Bundesliga
A = Away; H = Home; W = Win; D = Draw; L = Loss

==== Matches ====
The league fixtures were announced on 22 June 2022.

23 July 2022 1	LASK	3–1	Austria Klagenfurt	Linz
17:00 CEST (UTC+2)	Nakamura 14'; Goiginger 29'; Ljubičić 49'	Report	Pink 89'	Stadium: Raiffeisen Arena; Attendance: 4,064; Referee: Harald Lechner

31 July 2022 2	Austria Klagenfurt	0–1	Rapid Wien	Klagenfurt
17:00 CEST (UTC+2)		Report	Burgstaller 67' (pen.)	Stadium: Wörthersee Stadion; Attendance: 5,833; Referee: Manuel Schüttengruber

7 August 2022 3	WSG Tirol	2–2	Austria Klagenfurt	Innsbruck
17:00 CEST (UTC+2)	Prica 8', 12'	Report	Arweiler 90+2'; Wimmer 90+7' (pen.)	Stadium: Tivoli Stadion Tirol; Attendance: 2,116; Referee: Christopher Jäger

13 August 2022 4	Austria Klagenfurt	1–0	Ried	Klagenfurt
17:00 CEST (UTC+2)	Gezos (yellow card) 46'; Arweiler 73'; Cvetko (yellow card) 77'	Report	Lackner (yellow card) 47' (yellow-red card) 55'; David Ungar (yellow card) 75'; Nutz (yellow card) 90+3'	Stadium: Wörthersee Stadion; Attendance: 4,492; Referee: (Austria) Julian Weinberger

20 August 2022 5	Red Bull Salzburg	2–0	Austria Klagenfurt	Wals-Siezenheim
17:00 CEST (UTC+2)	Sučić (yellow card) 22'; Fernando 51'; Okafor 67'; Capaldo (yellow card) 82'	Report	Đorić (yellow card) 84'	Stadium: Red Bull Arena; Attendance: 10,159; Referee: (Austria) Josef Spurny

28 August 2022 6	Austria Klagenfurt	3–3	Austria Wien	Klagenfurt
17:00 CEST (UTC+2)	Pink 3' (yellow card) 40'; Rieder 46' (yellow card) 79'; Blauensteiner (yellow card) 56'; Irving 87' (pen.)	Report	Braunöder 45+4'; Ranftl 53' (yellow card) 89'; Keles 76'; Teigl (yellow card) 90+2'	Stadium: Wörthersee Stadion; Attendance: 3,607; Referee: (Austria) Markus Hameter

4 September 2022 7	Wolfsberger AC	3–4	Austria Klagenfurt	Wolfsberg
14:30 CEST (UTC+2)	Baribo 8'; Schifferl 28'; Anzolin (yellow card) 44'; Baumgartner (yellow card) 57'; Vergos 85' (pen.)	Report	Wimmer 16'; Pink 36' 60'; Cvetko 68'; Mahrer (yellow card) 84'	Stadium: Lavanttal-Arena; Attendance: 4,002; Referee: (Austria) Walter Altmann

11 September 2022 8	Austria Klagenfurt	0–2	Sturm Graz	Klagenfurt
17:00 CEST (UTC+2)	Wimmer (yellow card) 45'	Report	Gorenc Stanković (yellow card) 12'; Hierländer (yellow card) 27'; Prass (yellow card) 47'; Ljubic 66'; Emegha 90+4' (yellow card) 90+5'	Stadium: Wörthersee Stadion; Attendance: 4,653; Referee: (Austria) Manuel Schüttengruber

17 September 2022 9	Rheindorf Altach	1–4	Austria Klagenfurt	Altach
17:00 CEST (UTC+2)	Tibidi 39'; Thurnwald (yellow card) 58'; Ndiaye (yellow card) 73'	Report	Pink 45' 51' 78'; Wimmer (yellow card) 75'; Bonnah 90+3'	Stadium: CASHPOINT Arena; Attendance: 3,458; Referee: (Austria) Julian Weinberger

2 October 2022 10	Hartberg	2–3	Austria Klagenfurt	Hartberg
14:30 CEST (UTC+2)	Tadić 16' (pen.); Kriwak (yellow card) 35' (goal) 56'; Farkas (yellow card) 90+3'	Report	Rieder 3' (yellow card) 18'; Pink (yellow card) 15'; Wimmer 45+5'; Irving 90+3' (pen.)	Stadium: Profertil Arena Hartberg; Attendance: 1,721; Referee: (Austria) Andreas Heiß

8 October 2022 11	Austria Klagenfurt	2–1	Austria Lustenau	Klagenfurt
17:00 CEST (UTC+2)	Gezos 15' 64' (yellow card) 80'; Schumacher (yellow card) 49'	Report	Türkmen (yellow card) 44'; Bellache (yellow card) 77'; Schmid 87'	Stadium: Wörthersee Stadion; Attendance: 3,592; Referee: (Austria) Stefan Ebner

15 October 2022 12	Austria Klagenfurt	1–3	LASK	Klagenfurt
17:00 CEST (UTC+2)	Arweiler 63'; Irving (yellow card) 64'; Benatelli (yellow card) 80'; Wimmer (yellow card) 81'	Report	Ljubičić 15' (yellow card) 45+3' (goal) 72'; Kecskés (yellow card) 76'; Nakamura 78'	Stadium: Wörthersee Stadion; Attendance: 3,388; Referee: (Austria) Julian Weinberger

22 October 2022 13	Rapid Wien	0–1	Austria Klagenfurt	Vienna
17:00 CEST (UTC+2)	Bajic (yellow card) 23'; Kerschbaum (yellow card) 62'	Report	Pink 6'; Wernitznig (yellow card) 58'	Stadium: Allianz Stadion; Attendance: 16,057; Referee: (Austria) Dieter Muckenhammer

29 October 2022 14	Austria Klagenfurt	2–3	WSG Tirol	Klagenfurt
17:00 CEST (UTC+2)	Rieder (yellow card) 37'; Irving (yellow card) 43'; Pink 44' 76'; Moreira (yellow card) 83'	Report	Sabitzer 2' (yellow card) 45+2'; Blume (yellow card) 12'; Ogrinec (yellow card) 28'; Ranacher 42'; Prelec (yellow card) 84'; Müller 90'	Stadium: Wörthersee Stadion; Attendance: 3,558; Referee: (Austria) Manuel Schüttengruber

5 November 2022 15	Ried	2–2	Austria Klagenfurt	Ried im Innkreis
17:00 CEST (UTC+2)	Chabbi 30' 78' (pen.)	Report	Wernitznig (yellow card) 39'; Pink 52' 73'; Wimmer (yellow card) 76'; Mahrer (yellow card) 82'	Stadium: Josko Arena; Attendance: 4,146; Referee: (Austria) Markus Hameter

13 November 2022 16	Austria Klagenfurt	0–1	Red Bull Salzburg	Klagenfurt
14:30 CEST (UTC+2)	Gezos (yellow card) 36'; Irving (yellow card) 50'; Đorić (yellow card) 90+4'	Report	Bernardo (yellow card) 24'; Šeško 55'; Köhn (yellow card) 80'; Dedić (yellow card) 90+4'	Stadium: Wörthersee Stadion; Attendance: 5,847; Referee: (Austria) Chiristian-Petru Ciochirca

12 February 2023 17	Austria Wien	–	Austria Klagenfurt	Vienna
17:00 CET (UTC+1)				Stadium: Franz Horr Stadium

18 February 2023 18	Austria Klagenfurt	–	Wolfsberger AC	Klagenfurt
17:00 CET (UTC+1)				Stadium: Wörthersee Stadion

25 February 2023 19	Sturm Graz	–	Austria Klagenfurt	Graz
17:00 CET (UTC+1)				Stadium: Merkur-Arena

==== Championship round ====
Pos	Team	Pld	W	D	L	GF	GA	GD	Pts	Qualification	RBS	STU	LIN	RWI	AWI	KLA
2	Sturm Graz	32	20	6	6	57	29	+28	42	Qualification for the Champions League third qualifying round	0–2	—	2–0	3–1	3–2	4–1
3	LASK	32	14	12	6	54	38	+16	35	Qualification for the Europa League play-off round	0–1	2–1	—	3–1	3–1	4–0
4	Rapid Wien	32	12	6	14	50	47	+3	25	Qualification for the Europa Conference League third qualifying round	1–1	3–2	1–1	—	3–3	3–1
5	Austria Wien (O)	32	11	10	11	55	52	+3	24	Qualification for the Europa Conference League play-offs	1–1	1–2	2–2	3–1	—	1–2
6	Austria Klagenfurt	32	11	5	16	45	63	−18	23		0–3	0–2	1–1	2–1	1–1	—

Source: Austrian Football Bundesliga
Legend: Blue = home team win; Yellow = draw; Red = away team win.
Rules for classification: 1) Points; 2) Points with (possible) half points subtracted due to rounding; 3) Head-to-head points; 4) Head-to-head goal difference; 5) Head-to-head goals scored; 6) Head-to-head away goals scored; 7) Goal difference; 8) Goals scored; 9) Matches won; 10) Away matches won; 11) Away goals scored.
(O) Play-off winners

=== Austrian Cup ===
15 July 2022 First round	SC Admira Dornbirn 1946	1–8	Austria Klagenfurt	Dornbirn
18:00	Suleiman (yellow card) 10'; Karahasanovic (yellow card) 13'; Huber 20'		Wernitznig 2'; Cvetko 18', 22'; Mahrer 25'; Pink 53'; Karweina 81'; Arweiler 84'; Rieder 86'	Stadium: Sportsplatz Admira Dornbirn; Attendance: 450; Referee: Christopher Jäger

31 August 2022 Second round	Schwarz-Weiß Bregenz	0–5	Austria Klagenfurt	Bregenz
19:00	Doriano Giorgio (yellow card) 55'; Dario Barada (yellow card) 62'	Report	Cvetko 2'; Rieder 30'; Irving 32'; Mahrer (yellow card) 54'; Karweina 58'; Arweiler 90' (pen.)	Stadium: ImmoAgentur Stadion; Attendance: 500; Referee: (Austria) Ames Talic

18 October 2022 Third round	Dornbirn	1–2	Austria Klagenfurt	Dornbirn
19:00	Renan 39'; Leo Mätzler (yellow card) 74'	Report	Winmer 18'; Moreira (yellow card) 62'; Cvetko 82'	Stadium: Stadion Birkenwiese; Attendance: 1,000; Referee: (Austria) Walter Altmann

5 February 2023 Quarter-Finals	LASK	–	Austria Klagenfurt	Pasching
18:00				Stadium: Raiffeisen Arena
