= 2022–23 SC Rheindorf Altach season =

SC Rheindorf Altach
2022–23 season
- Chairman: Werner Gunz
- Manager: Miroslav Klose
- Stadium: Stadion Schnabelholz
- Austrian Bundesliga: 11th
- Austrian Cup: Second round

The 2022–23 season was the 93rd in the history of SC Rheindorf Altach and their third consecutive season in the top flight. The club participated in the Austrian Football Bundesliga and the Austrian Cup. The club finished 12th in the Bundesliga, bottom of the league, in the regular season, but after the relegation round, climbed to 11th and thus avoided relegation. They were eliminated in the second round of the Austrian Cup by Admira Wacker.

== Players ==
=== First team squad ===
As of 27 January 2023

Note: Flags indicate national team as defined under FIFA eligibility rules; some limited exceptions apply. Players may hold more than one non-FIFA nationality.

No.	Pos.	Nation	Player
1	GK	DEN	Andreas Jungdal (on loan from AC Milan)
4	DF	AUT	Felix Strauß
5	DF	AUT	Lukas Gugganig
6	DF	FRA	Pape-Alioune Ndiaye
7	FW	AUT	Noah Bischof
9	FW	KOS	Atdhe Nuhiu
10	MF	AUT	Dominik Reiter
11	FW	HUN	Csaba Bukta
13	GK	AUT	Tino Casali
14	MF	AUT	Samuel Mischitz
15	FW	GHA	Forson Amankwah (on loan from Red Bull Salzburg)
16	MF	AUT	Emanuel Schreiner
17	DF	NGA	Nosa Iyobosa Edokpolor
18	DF	AUT	Jan Zwischenbrugger (captain)

No.	Pos.	Nation	Player
19	DF	AUT	Sebastian Aigner
20	MF	AUT	Johannes Tartarotti
22	FW	AUT	Amir Abdijanovic
23	MF	AUT	Lukas Jäger
26	MF	AUT	Emre Yabantas
27	MF	AUT	Stefan Haudum
28	MF	CRO	Jan Jurčec
29	FW	FRA	Alexis Tibidi (on loan from VfB Stuttgart)
32	GK	AUT	Jakob Odehnal
33	MF	GER	Mike-Steven Bähre
34	DF	AUT	Manuel Thurnwald
37	FW	AUT	Ronny Rikal
42	MF	MLI	Bakary Nimaga

=== Out on loan ===
Note: Flags indicate national team as defined under FIFA eligibility rules; some limited exceptions apply. Players may hold more than one non-FIFA nationality.

No.	Pos.	Nation	Player
—	DF	AUT	Leo Mätzler (at Dornbirn until 30 June 2023)
—	MF	AUT	Noah Bitsche (at Vorwärts Steyr until 30 June 2023)

No.	Pos.	Nation	Player
—	MF	AUT	Lukas Parger (at Dornbirn until 30 June 2023)

== Pre-season and friendlies ==
Win Draw Loss Fixtures

25 June 2022 Friendly	Rheindorf Altach	0–1	(Switzerland) Luzern	Schruns, Switzerland
16:00 CEST (UTC+2)			Gentner 34'	Stadium: Sportplatz Golm

8 July 2022 Friendly	Rheindorf Altach	1–1	(Switzerland) Winterthur	Altach, Austria
18:00 CEST (UTC+2)				Stadium: Stadion Schnabelholz

22 September 2022 Friendly	Rheindorf Altach	2–0	(Austria) Dornbirn	Altach, Austria
11:00 CEST (UTC+2)				Stadium: Cashpoint Arena Trainingsplatz

18 November 2022 Friendly	Rheindorf Altach	5–0	(Austria) Dornbirn	Altach, Austria
11:00 CET (UTC+1)				Stadium: Stadion Schnabelholz

25 November 2022 Friendly	SV Sandhausen (Germany)	0–0	Rheindorf Altach	Eislingen, Germany
13:30 CET (UTC+1)				Stadium: Eichenbachstadion

2 December 2022 Friendly	Grasshoppers (Switzerland)	4–1	Rheindorf Altach	Niederhasli, Switzerland
14:30 CET (UTC+1)	Morandi 1'; Demhasaj 17'; De Carvalho 20'; Shabani 50'		Bukta 72'

15 January 2023 Friendly	St. Gallen (Switzerland)	0–1	Rheindorf Altach	St. Gallen, Switzerland
14:00 CET (UTC+1)				Stadium: Kybunpark

21 January 2023 Friendly	Rheindorf Altach	1–0	(Germany) VfB Stuttgart II
14:00 CET (UTC+1)

27 January 2023 Friendly	SpVgg Unterhaching (Germany)	2–3	Rheindorf Altach
14:00 CET (UTC+1)

29 January 2023 Friendly	Rheindorf Altach	–	(France) AS Monaco FC II
11:00 CEST (UTC+2)

== Competitions ==
=== Austrian Football Bundesliga ===
==== Regular season ====
League table

Pos	Team	Pld	W	D	L	GF	GA	GD	Pts	Qualification
8	Austria Lustenau	22	7	6	9	29	37	−8	27	Qualification for the Relegation round
9	Wolfsberger AC	22	6	3	13	35	41	−6	21	Qualification for the Relegation round
10	Hartberg	22	5	3	14	22	42	−20	18	Qualification for the Relegation round
11	SV Ried	22	4	6	12	16	32	−16	18	Qualification for the Relegation round
12	Rheindorf Altach	22	4	5	13	22	44	−22	17	Qualification for the Relegation round

Source: Austrian Football Bundesliga
Rules for classification: 1) Points; 2) Head-to-head record; 3) Goal difference; 4) Goals scored; 5) Matches won; 6) Away matches won; 7) Away goals scored.

Matches

The league fixtures were announced on 22 June 2022.

Win	Draw	Loss

Austrian Bundesliga match details
Match	Date	Time	Opponent	Venue	Result F–A	Scorers	Attendance	Ref.
1	24 July 2022	17:00	TSV Hartberg	Away	1–2	Nuhiu 84'	1,943	
2	30 July 2022	17:00	Wolfsberger AC	Home	2–2	Nuhiu 12', Jäger 63'	3,832	
3	7 August 2022	17:00	Austria Wien	Home	3–2	Nuhiu 63', 90+4', Braunöder 74' o.g.	4,816	
4	13 August 2022	19:30	Sturm Graz	Away	0–4		9,584	
5	20 August 2022	17:00	Austria Lustenau	Home	1–2	Tibidi 25'	8,500	
6	27 August 2022	19:30	LASK	Away	1–4	Jurčec 61'	5,130	
7	4 September 2022	14:30	Rapid Wien	Home	0–1		5,417	
8	10 September 2022	17:00	WSG Tirol	Away	0–0		1,704	
9	17 September 2022	17:00	Austria Klagenfurt	Home	1–4	Tibidi 39'	3,458	
10	2 October 2022	14:30	SV Ried	Away	3–2	Nuhiu 4', Tibidi 53', Tartarotti 70'	3,803	
11	8 October 2022	17:00	Red Bull Salzburg	Home	2–3	Tibidi 57', Nuhiu 78'	4,689	
12	16 October 2022	14:30	TSV Hartberg	Home	1–0	Nuhiu 90+2'	4,677	
13	23 October 2022	14:30	Wolfsberger AC	Away	3–2	Bischof 11', 29', Tibidi 71'	3,105	
14	30 October 2022	14:30	Austria Wien	Away	1–2	Amankwah 42'	12,474	
15	6 November 2022	14:30	Sturm Graz	Home	1–1	Nuhiu 15'	7,143	
16	12 November 2022	17:00	Austria Lustenau	Away	0–3		4,592	
17	12 February 2023	14:30	LASK	Home	0–1		4,258	
18	19 February 2023	17:00	Rapid Wien	Away	0–3		15,507	
19	26 February 2023	14:30	WSG Tirol	Home	0–0		3,824	
20	5 March 2023	14:30	Austria Klagenfurt	Away	0–3		2,901	
21	12 March 2023	17:00	SV Ried	Home	1–2	Bähre 8'	4,271	
22	19 March 2023	17:00	Red Bull Salzburg	Away	1–1	Nuhiu 56'	9,708	

==== Relegation round ====
League table

Pos	Team	Pld	W	D	L	GF	GA	GD	Pts	Qualification	WOL	LUS	WAT	HAR	ALT	RIE
1	Wolfsberger AC	32	12	6	14	51	51	0	31	Qualification for the Europa Conference League play-offs	—	2–2	2–0	2–2	0–0	1–0
2	Austria Lustenau	32	11	10	11	50	54	−4	29	Qualification for the Europa Conference League play-offs	1–3	—	2–4	5–1	1–0	2–2
3	WSG Tirol	32	10	8	14	44	53	−9	24		4–0	0–2	—	1–1	1–1	1–1
4	Hartberg	32	9	6	17	39	56	−17	24		0–2	0–1	5–0	—	2–2	2–0
5	Rheindorf Altach	32	6	10	16	29	53	−24	19		0–2	1–1	1–0	0–1	—	1–1
6	Ried (R)	32	4	11	17	27	50	−23	14	Relegation to Austrian Football Second League	1–2	4–4	1–1	1–3	0–1	—

Rules for classification: 1) Points; 2) Points with (possible) half points subtracted due to rounding; 3) Head-to-head points; 4) Head-to-head goal difference; 5) Head-to-head goals scored; 6) Head-to-head away goals scored; 7) Goal difference; 8) Goals scored; 9) Matches won; 10) Away matches won; 11) Away goals scored.
(R) Relegated

Matches

Austrian Bundesliga match details
Match	Date	Time	Opponent	Venue	Result F–A	Scorers	Attendance	Ref.
23	1 April 2023	17:00	WSG Tirol	Home	1–0	Bischof 59'	3,412	
24	8 April 2023	17:00	Austria Lustenau	Away	0–1		4,590	
25	15 April 2023	17:00	TSV Hartberg	Away	2–2	Gugganig 10', Jurčec 33'	2,607	
26	22 April 2023	17:00	SV Ried	Home	1–1	Nuhiu 73'	4,429	
27	28 April 2023	19:30	Wolfsberger AC	Home	0–2		3,991	
28	5 May 2023	19:30	Wolfsberger AC	Away	0–0		2,388	
29	13 May 2023	17:00	TSV Hartberg	Home	0–1		4,134	
30	19 May 2023	19:30	SV Ried	Away	1–0	Ungar 83' o.g.	7,300	
31	27 May 2023	17:00	Austria Lustenau	Home	1–1	Abdijanovic 34'	8,500	
32	2 June 2023	19:30	WSG Tirol	Away	1–1	Schreiner 79'	2,350	

=== Austrian Cup ===
Austrian Cup match details
Round	Date	Time	Opponent	Venue	Result F–A	Scorers	Attendance	Ref.
First round	16 July 2022	18:00	Elektra Wien	Away	3–1	Nuhiu 5', 19', Amankwah 74'	402	
Second round	30 August 2022	18:00	Admira Wacker	Away	0–3		1,150	
