= Hasenhüttl =

Hasenhüttl is an Austrian surname. Notable people with the surname include:

- Patrick Hasenhüttl (born 1997), Austrian footballer
- Ralph Hasenhüttl (born 1967), Austrian football manager and former player
