= Felix Strauß =

Austrian footballer (born 2001)

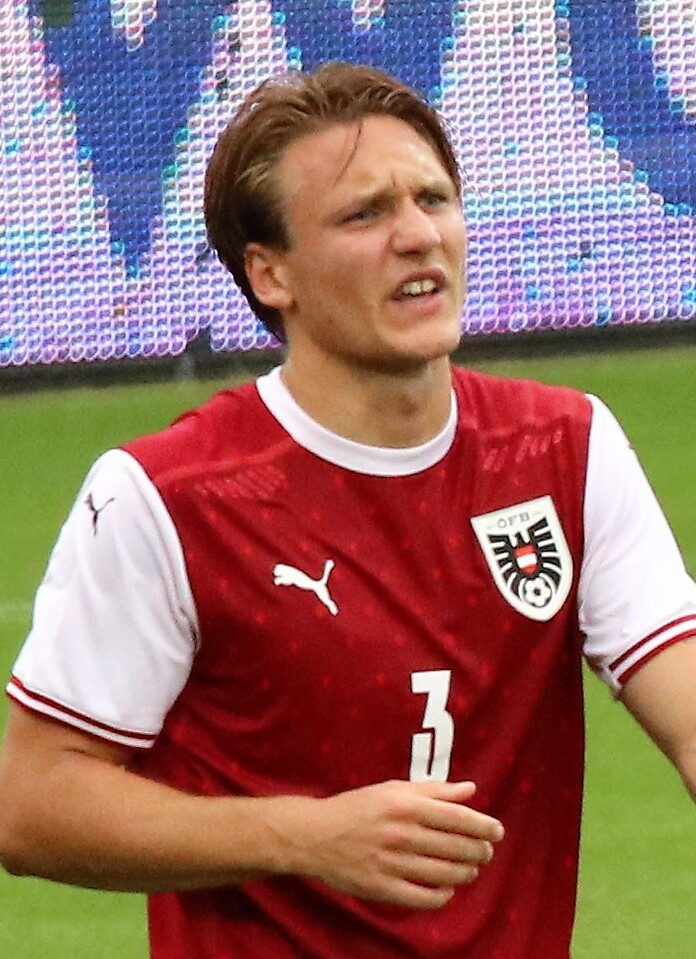
- Strauß in 2022

Personal information
- Date of birth: 26 March 2001 (age 25)
- Place of birth: Salzburg, Austria
- Height: 1.86 m (6 ft 1 in)
- Position: Centre-back

Team information
- Current team: Jahn Regensburg
- Number: 4

Youth career
- 2008–2014: SC Golling
- 2014: SV Grödig
- 2014–2019: Red Bull Salzburg
- 2019–2020: Viktoria Köln

Senior career*
| Years | Team | Apps | (Gls) |
| 2020–2021 | Blau-Weiß Linz | 29 | (2) |
| 2021–2024 | Rheindorf Altach | 56 | (2) |
| 2024 | Lahti | 11 | (1) |
| 2025 | Spartak Varna | 11 | (2) |
| 2025– | Jahn Regensburg | 39 | (1) |

International career^{‡}
| 2022 | Austria U21 | 2 | (0) |
- * Club domestic league appearances and goals as of 14:24, 26 September 2026 (UTC) ‡ National team caps and goals as of 16:53, 30 December 2022 (UTC)

Felix Strauß (born 26 March 2001) is an Austrian professional footballer who plays as a centre-back for German 3. Liga club Jahn Regensburg. He has represented Austria at under-21 level.

== Club career ==
=== Early years ===
Strauß began his career at SC Golling. In February 2014, he moved to the youth teams of SV Grödig. Ahead of the 2014–15 season, he joined the renowned academy of Red Bull Salzburg, where he progressed through all age groups in the academy. Before the 2019–20 season, he moved to Germany to join the U19 team of Viktoria Köln. For the Cologne-based club he made 19 appearances in the Under 19 Bundesliga as team captain.

=== Blau-Weiß Linz ===
Prior to the 2020–21 season, Strauß returned to Austria to join second division club Blau-Weiß Linz on a contract until June 2022. He made his 2. Liga debut on 11 September 2020, when he came off the bench for Bernhard Janeczek in the 82nd minute on the first matchday of that season against Austria Klagenfurt. By the end of the season, he had made 28 appearances in the second division, scoring two goals.

=== Rheindorf Altach ===
==== 2021–22 season ====
On 21 June 2021, Strauß signed a three-year contract with Austrian Football Bundesliga club Rheindorf Altach. He made his debut on 24 July, the opening day of the domestic league, in a 1–0 home loss to LASK. He would quickly establish himself in the starting lineup of the Vorarlberg-based side, first as a defensive midfielder under head coach Damir Canadi, and, as the season progressed, as a centre-back alongside Jan Zwischenbrugger.

His performances earned him a call-up to the Austria under-21 team in March 2022, as Altach were involved in a relegation battle. Strauß scored his first goal for the club on 2 April 2022, securing a 2–2 draw and a completed comeback against Admira Wacker Mödling deep into injury time. On 20 May, Strauß scored his second goal for the club which would prove to be crucial as his team managed a 2–1 win over WSG Tirol. Thereby, Altach avoided relegation by finishing one point ahead of Admira Wacker Mödling. In May, Strauß was named as the winner of Rheindorf Altach's Player of the Season award, given to the club's best player from the previous season.

==== 2022–23 season ====
Strauß missed the first two league games of the 2022–23 season with an infection, and made his first season appearance for Altach on 7 August 2022 in a league game against Austria Wien. He replaced Lukas Gugganig in the 60th minute, before being forced off due to an injury; it was later confirmed how he would be sidelined for several months as he had "torn his ankle ligament". He was set to return to action on 2 October for the league match against SV Ried, and found himself in the starting lineup from then on under new head coach Miroslav Klose.

Strauß was mainly a starter during the latter part of the season, as Altach managed to stay in the league after being embroiled in relegation battle. He finished the season with 22 total appearances, in which he scored once.

==== 2023–24 season ====
After having been ruled out due to injury at the start of the new season, Strauß established himself as a starter early under new head coach Joachim Standfest. He later lost his starting spot and did not regain it. He concluded the season with 10 league appearances—nine of which were in the autumn—and departed when his contract expired in June 2024.

=== Lahti ===
On 26 July 2024, Strauss signed with Lahti in Finnish Veikkausliiga. Strauss scored his first league goal on 19 September, in a 2–1 home win against IFK Mariehamn. He left the club at the end of the season after the relegation.

=== Jahn Regensburg ===
On 2 July 2025, Strauss signed a two-year contract with Jahn Regensburg in German 3. Liga.

== International career ==
Strauß received his first call-up to the under-21 squad for European Championship qualifiers against Croatia and Norway in March 2022. He made his debut for Austria U21 when he came on to replace Alexander Prass at half-time of the match against Norway on 29 March.

== Career statistics ==
As of 26 September 2026

Appearances and goals by club, season and competition
| Club | Season | League | | | Austrian Cup | | Other | | Total | |
| Club | Season | Division | Apps | Goals | Apps | Goals | Apps | Goals | Apps | Goals |
|---|---|---|---|---|---|---|---|---|---|---|
| Blau-Weiß Linz | 2020–21 | Austrian 2. Liga | 29 | 2 | 3 | 0 | — | | 32 | 2 |
| Rheindorf Altach | 2021–22 | Austrian Bundesliga | 25 | 2 | 0 | 0 | — | | 25 | 2 |
| Rheindorf Altach | 2022–23 | Austrian Bundesliga | 21 | 0 | 1 | 0 | — | | 22 | 0 |
| Rheindorf Altach | 2023–24 | Austrian Bundesliga | 10 | 0 | 3 | 0 | — | | 13 | 0 |
| Rheindorf Altach | Total | | 56 | 2 | 4 | 0 | 0 | 0 | 60 | 2 |
| Lahti | 2024 | Veikkausliiga | 11 | 1 | — | | — | | 11 | 1 |
| Spartak Varna | 2024–25 | Bulgarian First League | 11 | 2 | 0 | 0 | – | | 11 | 2 |
| Jahn Regensburg | 2025–26 | 3. Liga | 32 | 1 | 1 | 0 | – | | 33 | 1 |
| Jahn Regensburg | 2026–27 | 3. Liga | 7 | 0 | – | | – | | 7 | 0 |
| Jahn Regensburg | Total | | 39 | 1 | 1 | 0 | 0 | 0 | 40 | 1 |
| Career total | | | 146 | 8 | 8 | 0 | 0 | 0 | 154 | 9 |

== Honours ==
Blau-Weiß Linz

- 2. Liga: 2020–21
