= Sebastian Soto (soccer, born 2000) =

American soccer player (born 2000)

Personal information
- Full name: Sebastian Guerra Soto
- Date of birth: July 28, 2000 (age 26)
- Place of birth: Carlsbad, California, United States
- Height: 6 ft 0 in (1.83 m)
- Position: Forward

Youth career
- Carlsbad Lightning
- –2015: San Diego Surf
- 2016–2018: Real Salt Lake
- 2018–2019: Hannover 96

Senior career*
Years	Team	Apps	(Gls)
2019–2020	Hannover 96 II	3	(0)
2019–2020	Hannover 96	5	(0)
2020–2022	Norwich City	0	(0)
2020–2021	→ Telstar (loan)	12	(7)
2021–2022	→ Porto B (loan)	8	(1)
2022	→ Livingston (loan)	12	(0)
2022–2024	Austria Klagenfurt II	4	(3)
2022–2024	Austria Klagenfurt	18	(1)
Total		62	(12)

International career
2018	United States U19	4	(5)
2018–2019	United States U20	11	(6)
2019–2021	United States U23	6	(2)
2020	United States	2	(2)
- * Club domestic league appearances and goals

Sebastian Guerra Soto (born July 28, 2000) is an American former professional soccer player who played as a forward.

== Youth career ==
Soto began his youth career with San Diego Surf, before moving to the Real Salt Lake youth team in 2016. He signed with the University of California, Berkeley to play college soccer but ultimately decided to go pro.

== Club career ==
=== Hannover 96 ===
In August 2018, Soto joined the youth academy of German club Hannover 96 from Real Salt Lake. Playing in the 2018-19 Under 19 Bundesliga, Soto scored 17 goals in 27 matches for Hannover. He made his professional debut for the first team in the Bundesliga on April 6, 2019, coming on as a substitute in the 80th minute for Marvin Bakalorz in the 1–3 away loss against VfL Wolfsburg.

=== Norwich City ===
Soto joined Norwich City on July 28, 2020, and signed a three-year deal.

==== 2020–21 season: Loan to Telstar ====
In August 2020, Soto joined Dutch side Telstar on loan for the 2020–21 season. Soto made his first start for the club on September 28, 2020, scoring two goals against FC Den Bosch. In January 2021, Soto was recalled by Norwich after having scored 7 goals in just 12 league matches.

==== 2021–22 season: Loans to Porto B and Livingston ====
On July 3, 2021, Soto joined FC Porto B on a season-long loan. This loan was terminated mid-season, and on January 26, 2022, Soto joined Scottish Premiership side Livingston on loan for the remainder of the campaign.

==== 2022–23 season: Return to Norwich City ====
At the beginning of the 2022–23 season, Soto returned to Norwich City after a brief trial at Barnsley was cut short, with manager Michael Duff citing Soto's failure to report a foot injury in a warm-up game against Crewe.

=== Austria Klagenfurt and retirement ===
On August 25, 2022, Soto signed a three-year deal with Austrian Bundesliga side Austria Klagenfurt. His contract with Austria was mutually terminated on October 22, 2024.

On January 5, 2026, Soto publicly announced his retirement from professional football at the age of 25.

== International career ==
=== Youth ===
Soto made his debut for the United States under-19 team in May 2018, scoring five goals in four matches at the 2018 Slovakia Cup, where he won the Golden Boot award as top scorer.

In September 2018, he made his under-20 debut in a friendly match against Jamaica, scoring a brace in the 3–1 win. In November 2018, Soto was added as a replacement player to the United States' squad for the 2018 CONCACAF U-20 Championship. He made two appearances in the tournament, with the US going on to win the title.

On May 27, 2019, Soto scored two goals against Nigeria during the 2019 FIFA U-20 World Cup. He scored another brace on June 4 in the round of 16 match against France.

Soto was named to the team for the 2020 CONCACAF Men's Olympic Qualifying Championship after a postponement in March 2021. The team would fail to qualify for the Olympics.

=== Senior ===
In September 2020, Soto was called up by Chile for their 2022 FIFA World Cup qualification matches against Uruguay and Colombia, but he rejected the call-up. Soto was subsequently called up to the senior United States squad in November 2020 by manager Gregg Berhalter for friendly matches against Wales and Panama. Soto made his senior debut for the United States, coming on as a 77th-minute substitute and scoring two goals in a 6–2 friendly win against Panama on November 16, 2020.

== Personal life ==
Soto who is the son of a Chilean father and Mexican mother was born in Carlsbad, California.

== Career statistics ==
=== Club ===
As of match played May 19, 2024

Appearances and goals by club, season and competition
Club	Season	League			National cup		Total	
Club	Season	Division	Apps	Goals	Apps	Goals	Apps	Goals
Hannover 96	2018–19	Bundesliga	3	0	—		3	0
Hannover 96	2019–20	2. Bundesliga	2	0	—		2	0
Hannover 96	Total		5	0	—		5	0
Hannover 96 II	2018–19	Regionalliga Nord	3	0	—		3	0
Norwich City	2020–21	Championship	0	0	—		0	0
Telstar (loan)	2020–21	Eerste Divisie	12	7	—		12	7
Porto B (loan)	2021–22	Liga Portugal 2	8	1	—		8	1
Livingston (loan)	2021–22	Scottish Premiership	12	0	—		12	0
Austria Klagenfurt II	2022–23	Kärntner Liga	3	3	—		3	3
Austria Klagenfurt II	2024–25	Kärntner Liga	1	0	—		1	0
Austria Klagenfurt II	Total		4	3	—		4	3
Austria Klagenfurt	2022–23	Austrian Bundesliga	11	1	1	0	12	1
Austria Klagenfurt	2023–24	Austrian Bundesliga	7	0	—		7	0
Austria Klagenfurt	Total		18	1	1	0	19	1
Career total			62	12	1	0	63	12

=== International ===
As of December 10, 2020

Appearances and goals by national team and year
National team	Year	Apps	Goals
United States	2020	2	2
Total		2	2

Scores and results list United States' goal tally first, score column indicates score after each Soto goal.

List of international goals scored by Sebastian Soto
No.	Date	Venue	Cap	Opponent	Score	Result	Competition
1	November 16, 2020	Stadion Wiener Neustadt, Wiener Neustadt, Austria	1	Panama	4–2	6–2	Friendly
2	November 16, 2020	Stadion Wiener Neustadt, Wiener Neustadt, Austria	1	Panama	6–2	6–2	Friendly

== Honors ==
United States U20

- CONCACAF U-20 Championship: 2018
