= Raphael Hofer =

Austrian footballer

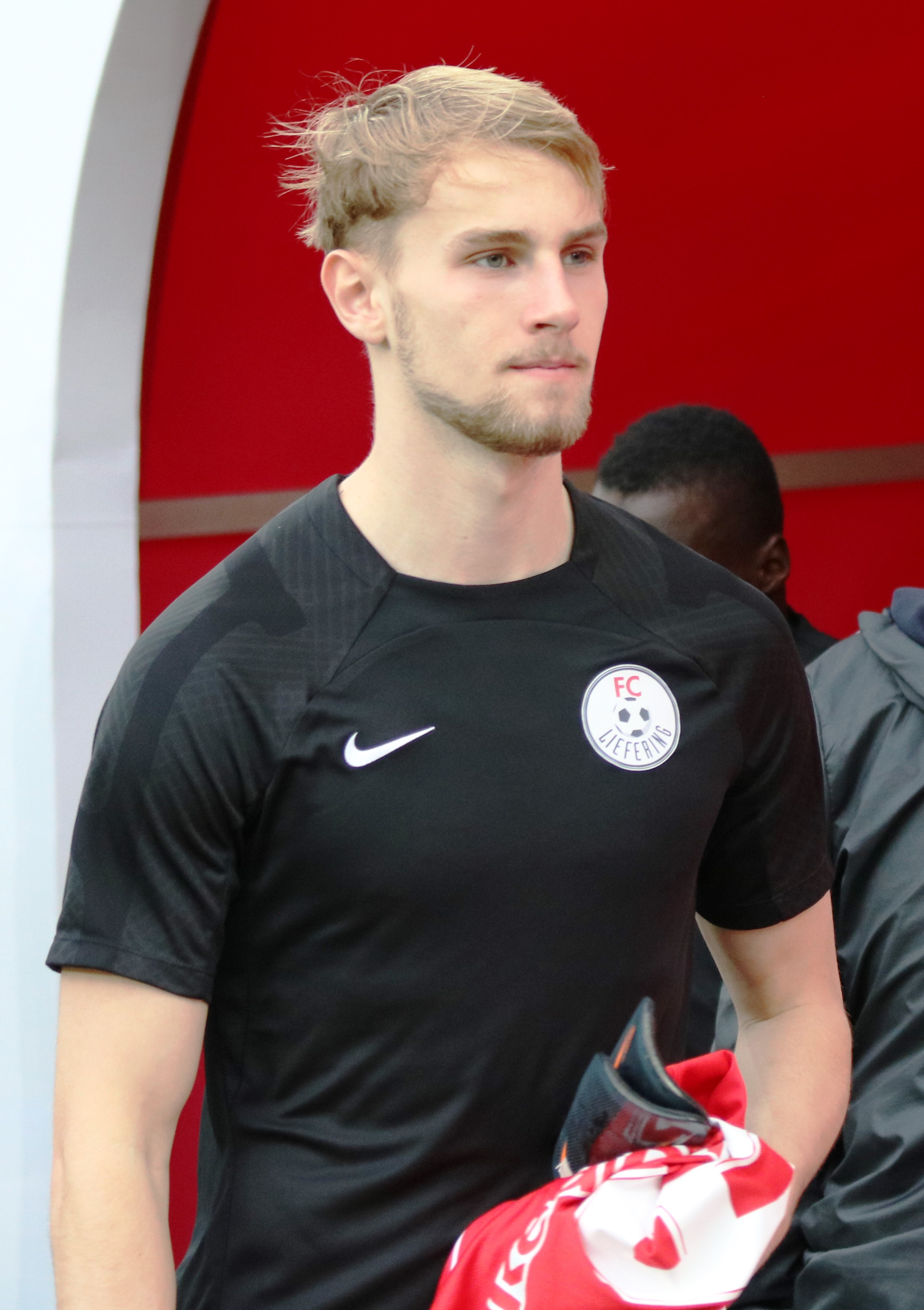
- Hofer with FC Liefering in 2023

Personal information
- Date of birth: 14 February 2003 (age 23)
- Height: 1.84 m (6 ft 0 in)
- Positions: Left-back; centre-back; defensive midfielder

Team information
- Current team: Austria Salzburg
- Number: 19

Youth career
- 2010–2013: SV Mauerkirchen
- 2013–2016: SV Ried
- 2016–2021: Red Bull Salzburg

Senior career*
| Years | Team | Apps | (Gls) |
| 2021–2024 | FC Liefering | 56 | (5) |
| 2023–2024 | → Blau-Weiß Linz (loan) | 6 | (0) |
| 2025 | Red Bull Salzburg | 0 | (0) |
| 2025 | → TSV Hartberg (loan) | 6 | (0) |
| 2025–2026 | Mura | 16 | (0) |
| 2026– | Austria Salzburg | 3 | (0) |

International career^{‡}
| 2023–2024 | Austria U21 | 6 | (0) |
- * Club domestic league appearances and goals as of 15 August 2026 ‡ National team caps and goals as of 26 March 2024

Raphael Hofer (born 14 February 2003) is an Austrian professional footballer who plays as a left-back, centre-back and defensive midfielder for 2. Liga club Austria Salzburg.

== Club career ==
On 5 July 2023, he was loaned to Blau-Weiß Linz. On 15 January 2025, Raphael Hofer was loaned to TSV Hartberg from Red Bull Salzburg. Prior to the loans, he played as co-operation player at FC Liefering.

On 1 July 2025, he moved to Slovenian PrvaLiga club Mura.

== International career ==
Hofer is a former Austrian youth international, having represented the under-21s from 2023 to 2024.

== Career statistics ==
=== Club ===
As of 6 December 2025

Appearances and goals by club, season and competition
| Club | Season | League | | | Cup | | Continental | | Other | | Total | |
| Club | Season | Division | Apps | Goals | Apps | Goals | Apps | Goals | Apps | Goals | Apps | Goals |
|---|---|---|---|---|---|---|---|---|---|---|---|---|
| FC Liefering | 2021–22 | 2. Liga | 11 | 0 | — | | — | | — | | 11 | 0 |
| FC Liefering | 2022–23 | 2. Liga | 27 | 3 | — | | — | | — | | 27 | 3 |
| FC Liefering | 2023–24 | 2. Liga | 10 | 2 | — | | — | | — | | 10 | 2 |
| FC Liefering | 2024–25 | 2. Liga | 8 | 0 | — | | — | | — | | 8 | 0 |
| FC Liefering | Total | | 56 | 5 | — | | — | | — | | 56 | 5 |
| Blau-Weiß Linz (loan) | 2023–24 | Austrian Bundesliga | 6 | 0 | 2 (Note: Appearances in Austrian Cup) | 0 | — | | — | | 8 | 0 |
| Blau-Weiß Linz (loan) | Total | | 6 | 0 | 2 | 0 | — | | — | | 8 | 0 |
| TSV Hartberg (loan) | 2024–25 | Austrian Bundesliga | 6 | 0 | 0 | 0 | — | | — | | 6 | 0 |
| TSV Hartberg (loan) | Total | | 6 | 0 | 0 | 0 | — | | — | | 6 | 0 |
| Mura | 2025–26 | Slovenian PrvaLiga | 16 | 0 | 2 (Note: Appearances in Slovenian Cup) | 0 | — | | — | | 18 | 0 |
| Mura | Total | | 16 | 0 | 2 | 0 | 0 | 0 | 0 | 0 | 18 | 0 |
| Career total | | | 84 | 5 | 4 | 0 | 0 | 0 | 0 | 0 | 88 | 5 |
