= Marcel Schantl =

Austrian footballer

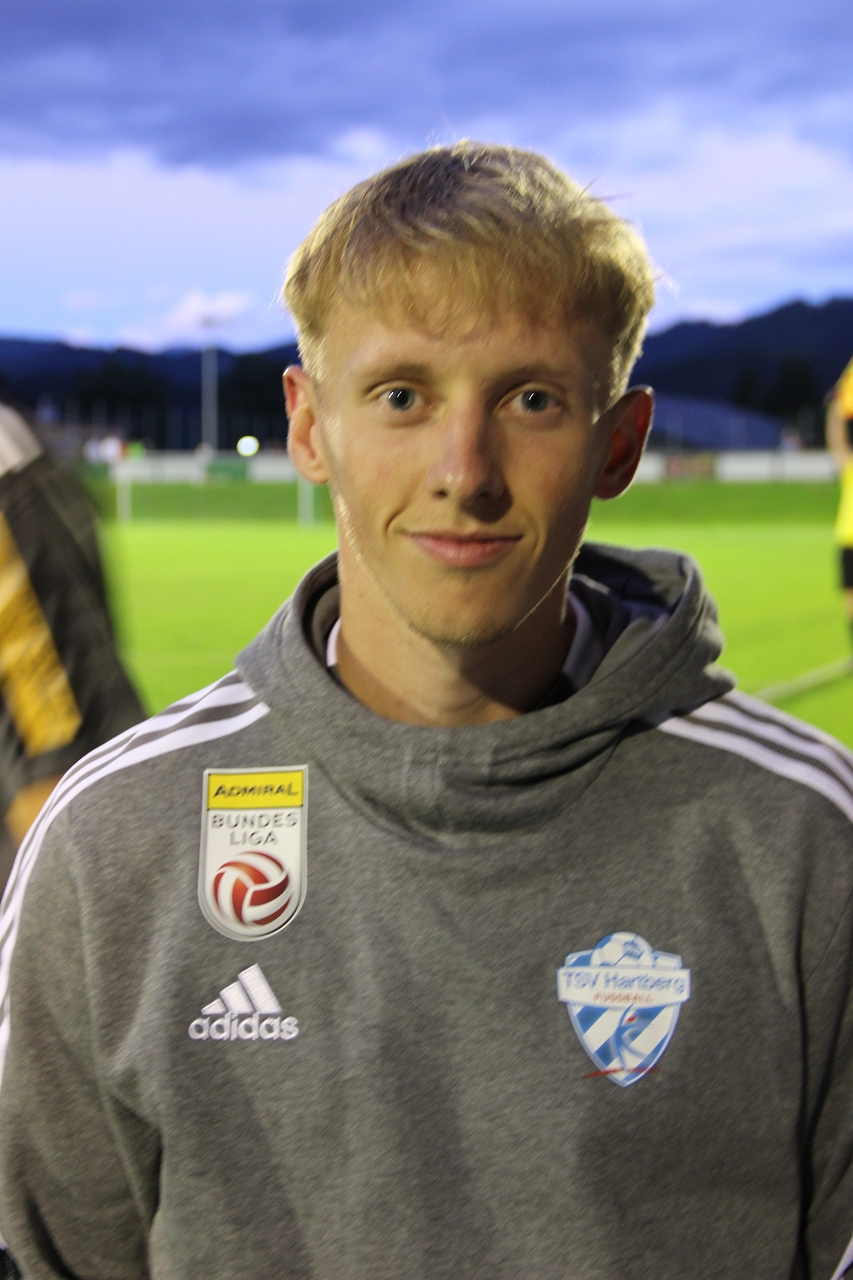
- Schantl in 2021

Personal information
- Date of birth: 17 August 2000 (age 26)
- Height: 1.82 m (6 ft 0 in)
- Position: Midfielder

Youth career
- –2009: SV St. Johann/Haide
- 2009–2017: TSV Hartberg

Senior career*
Years	Team	Apps	(Gls)
2017–2023	TSV Hartberg	9	(0)
2020–2021	→ Blau-Weiß Linz (loan)	27	(0)
2023–2025	Blau-Weiß Linz	18	(0)
- * Club domestic league appearances and goals as of 1 January 2026

Marcel Schantl (born 17 August 2000) is an Austrian footballer who plays as a midfielder.

== Club career ==
On 28 August 2020, he joined Blau-Weiß Linz on loan with a purchase option.

On 26 June 2023, Schantl returned to Blau-Weiß Linz on a three-year contract.

== Career statistics ==
=== Club ===
As of 20 February 2021.

Appearances and goals by club, season and competition
Club	Season	League			Cup		Continental		Other		Total	
Club	Season	Division	Apps	Goals	Apps	Goals	Apps	Goals	Apps	Goals	Apps	Goals
TSV Hartberg	2016–17	Regionalliga	1	0	0	0	–		0	0	1	0
TSV Hartberg	2017–18	2. Liga	0	0	0	0	–		0	0	0	0
TSV Hartberg	2018–19	Bundesliga	0	0	0	0	–		0	0	0	0
TSV Hartberg	2019–20	Bundesliga	2	0	0	0	–		0	0	2	0
TSV Hartberg	2020–21	Bundesliga	0	0	0	0	–		0	0	0	0
TSV Hartberg	Total		3	0	0	0	0	0	0	0	3	0
FC Blau-Weiß Linz (loan)	2020–21	2. Liga	12	0	3 (Note: Appearances in the Austrian Cup)	0	–		0	0	15	0
Career total			15	0	3	0	0	0	0	0	18	0
