= Jan Jurčec =

Croatian association footballer

Personal information
- Date of birth: 27 November 2000 (age 25)
- Place of birth: Zagreb, Croatia
- Height: 1.75 m (5 ft 9 in)
- Positions: Right-back; winger

Team information
- Current team: Śląsk Wrocław
- Number: 27

Youth career
- Lokomotiva Zagreb
- 2014–2019: Kustošija

Senior career*
Years	Team	Apps	(Gls)
2019–2022	Kustošija	69	(12)
2022–2024	Rheindorf Altach	58	(2)
2025–2026	Kryvbas Kryvyi Rih	40	(2)
2026–	Śląsk Wrocław	0	(0)

International career
2022–2023	Croatia U21	3	(0)
- * Club domestic league appearances and goals as of 18:36, 5 September 2026 (UTC)

Jan Jurčec (born 27 November 2000) is a Croatian professional footballer who plays as a right-back or winger for Ekstraklasa club Śląsk Wrocław.

== Career ==
A youth product of Lokomotiva Zagreb, Jurčec moved to the youth academy of Kustošija in 2014, and began his senior career with them in the First Football League in 2019. On 19 July 2022, he transferred to the Austrian club Rheindorf Altach until 2024. He made his professional debut with Rheindorf Altach in a 2–1 Austrian Football Bundesliga loss to Hartberg on 24 July 2022.

== International career ==
Born in Croatia, Jurčec is of Polish descent through his mother and holds a Polish passport. He was a youth international for Croatia, having played for the Croatia U21s.
