= Jan Zwischenbrugger =

Austrian footballer (born 1990)

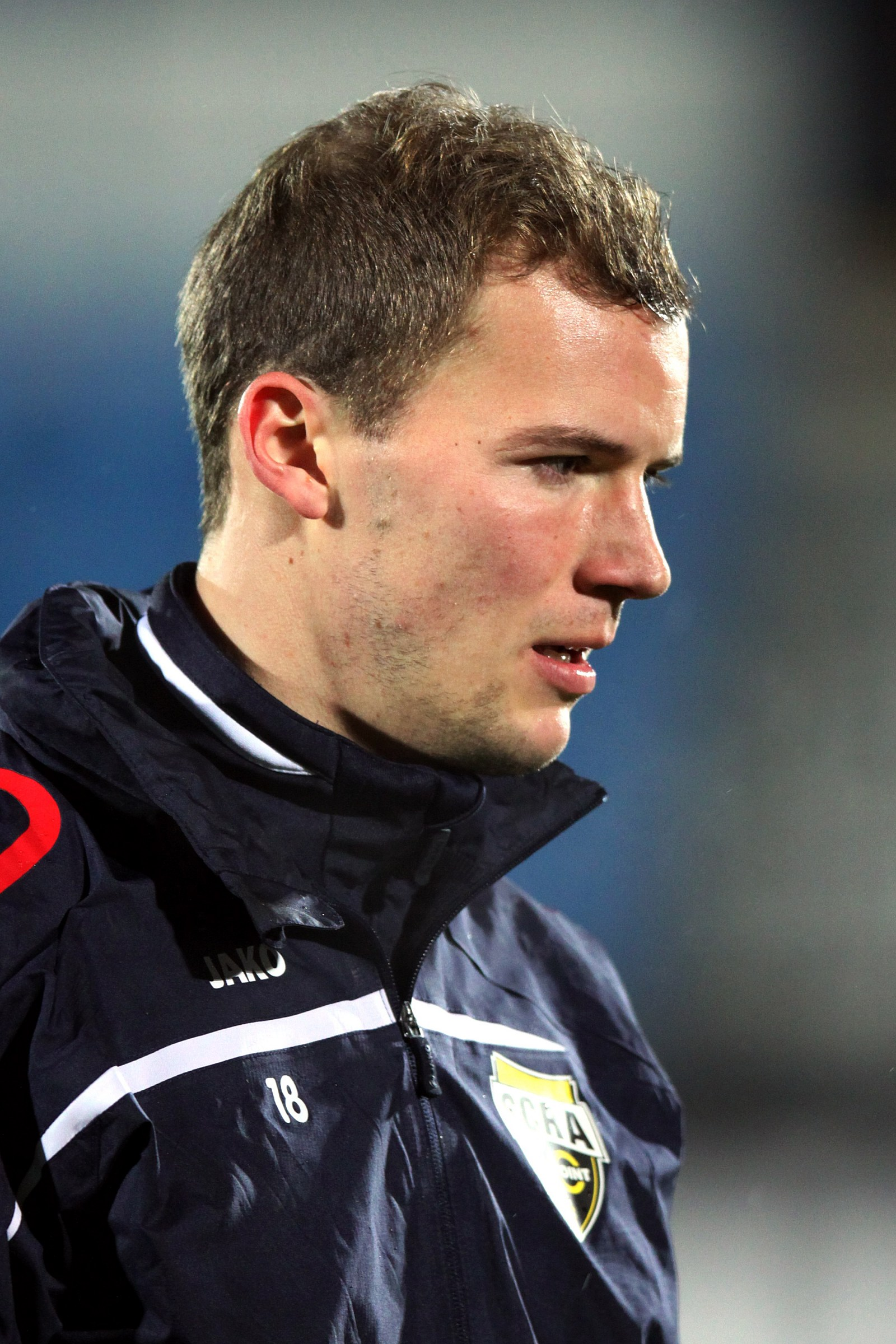
- Zwischenbrugger in 2014

Personal information
- Date of birth: 16 June 1990 (age 36)
- Place of birth: Au, Austria
- Height: 1.87 m (6 ft 2 in)
- Positions: Centre-back; defensive midfielder

Youth career
- 1996–2004: FC Bizau
- 2004–2009: AKA Vorarlberg

Senior career*
Years	Team	Apps	(Gls)
2009–2010	Rheindorf Altach II	17	(0)
2009–2010	Rheindorf Altach	0	(0)
2010–2013	Austria Lustenau	83	(12)
2013–2014	TSV Hartberg	13	(2)
2014	SV Ried	8	(0)
2014–2024	Rheindorf Altach	233	(8)
2024–2025	FV Ravensburg	17	(0)
Total		371	(22)
- * Club domestic league appearances and goals

Jan Zwischenbrugger (born 16 June 1990) is an Austrian former professional footballer who played as a centre-back.

== Career ==
=== Early years ===
Zwischenbrugger began his youth career with FC Bizau before moving to regional academy AKA Vorarlberg. In 2009, he joined 2. Liga club Rheindorf Altach, where he would only appear for the reserve team.

=== Austria Lustenau ===
In 2010, Zwischenbrugger joined Austria Lustenau. He made his professional debut against Admira Wacker Mödling on 2 August 2010 in a 2–0 loss.

=== TSV Hartberg and SV Ried ===
After becoming a regular starter in Lustenau, he moved to league rivals TSV Hartberg in August 2013. He would only play there for six months, before joining Austrian Bundesliga club SV Ried on 19 December 2013. He made his Bundesliga debut in the starting lineup on 8 February 2014 in a 2–1 victory against Wiener Neustadt.

=== Return to Rheindorf Altach ===
On 8 July 2014, Zwischenbrugger returned to newly promoted Bundesliga club Rheindorf Altach, his first professional club. He made his competitive debut for the club on 11 July in an Austrian Cup win over WSG Tirol. Eight days later he made his league debut on the opening day of the domestic season in a 1–0 win against Sturm Graz. Zwischenbrugger managed to immediately establish himself in the starting lineup, making 38 total appearances as Altach surprisingly finished third in the league table. With 59 points, they outperformed Grazer AK as the highest finishing promoted team in Bundesliga history. The club also qualified for the third qualifying round of the 2015–16 UEFA Europa League.

Zwischenbrugger made his European debut on 30 July 2015 in a 2–1 home win over Portuguese club Vitória de Guimarães, playing the full 90 minutes at centre-back alongside César Ortiz. Eventually, Altach would advance with a 6–2 aggregate score and qualify for the play-off round. There, after a 1–0 loss at home in the first leg and a goalless draw in the second leg, Altach failed to advance against Belenenses. Zwischenbrugger appeared in all matches of Altach's first European campaign.

On 11 April 2017, Zwischenbrugger signed a contract extension with Rheindorf Altach until 2019. He returned to European action in the 2017–18 UEFA Europa League, as Altach made the play-off round, where they narrowly failed to beat Israeli club Maccabi Tel Aviv with an overall score of 3–2. Zwischenbrugger appeared in both legs.

In May 2019, he extended his contract until 2022.

On 12 November 2021, Zwischenbrugger extended his contract with the club until 2024. On 9 April 2022, he made his 200th league appearance for Rheindorf Altach in a 3–0 victory over WSG Tirol in the Bundesliga, setting the record for most league appearances for the club. Thereby he eclipsed teammate Emanuel Schreiner, who had 197 appearances at that point.

After over 250 competitive matches for Altach, he left the club following the 2023–24 season, ending a ten-year tenure. At the time of his departure, he held the record for the most Bundesliga appearances in Altach's history.

=== FV Ravensburg ===
On 16 July 2024, Zwischenbrugger signed with German fifth-tier Oberliga Baden-Württemberg club FV Ravensburg.
