= Thorsten Mahrer =

Austrian footballer

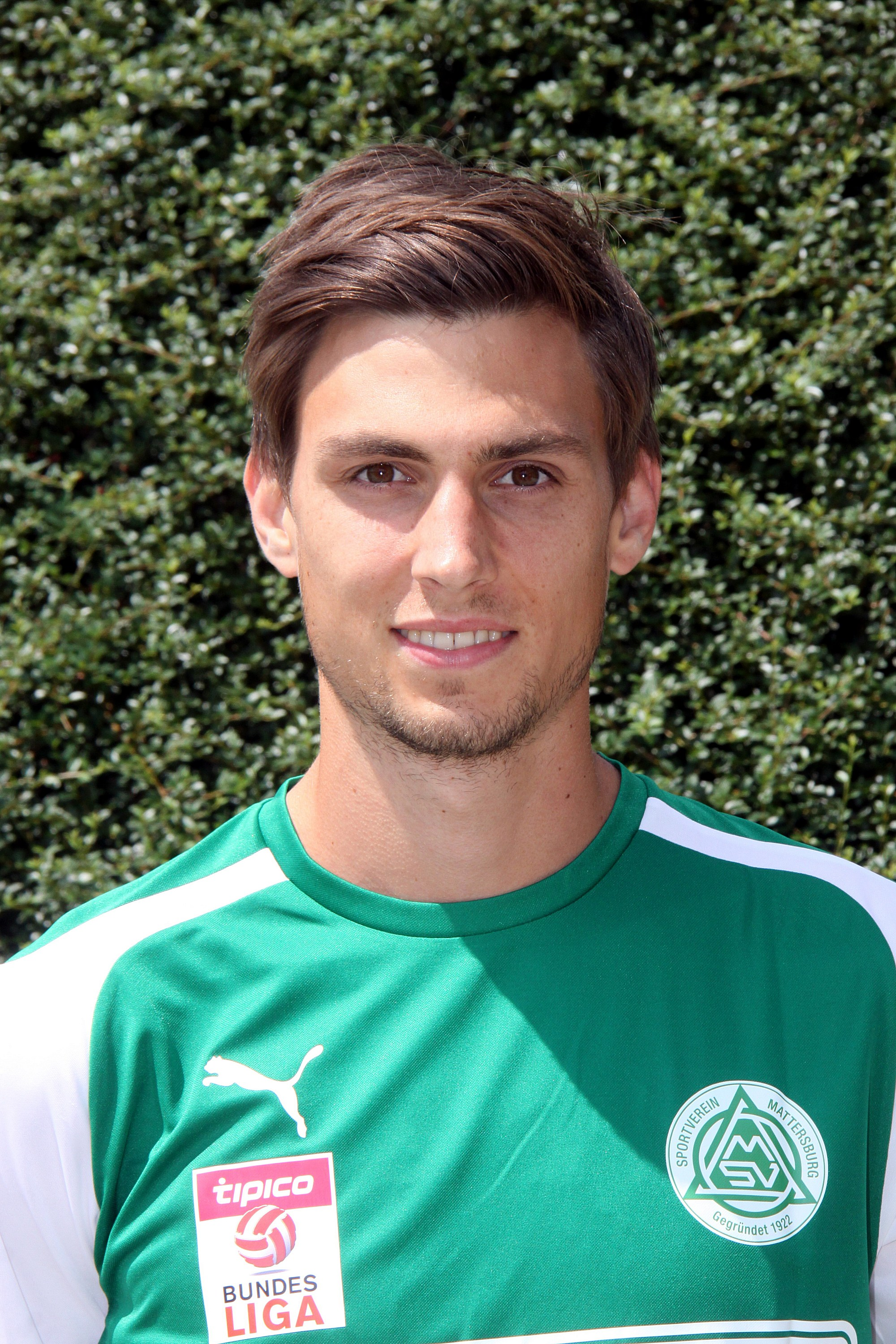

Personal information
- Full name: Thorsten Mahrer
- Date of birth: 22 January 1990 (age 36)
- Place of birth: Austria
- Height: 1.91 m (6 ft 3 in)
- Position: Defender

Team information
- Current team: ATUS Velden
- Number: 14

Youth career
- 1999–2008: SK Rapid Wien

Senior career*
Years	Team	Apps	(Gls)
2008–2014	SV Mattersburg II	163	(9)
2014–2020	SV Mattersburg	166	(13)
2020–2025	Austria Klagenfurt	144	(5)
2025–	ATUS Velden	29	(1)
- * Club domestic league appearances and goals as of 27 June 2026

Thorsten Mahrer (born 22 January 1990) is an Austrian footballer who plays for Austrian Regionalliga club ATUS Velden.

== Club career ==
On 9 July 2025, Mahrer signed for ATUS Velden.
