= Johannes Tartarotti =

Austrian footballer (born 1999)

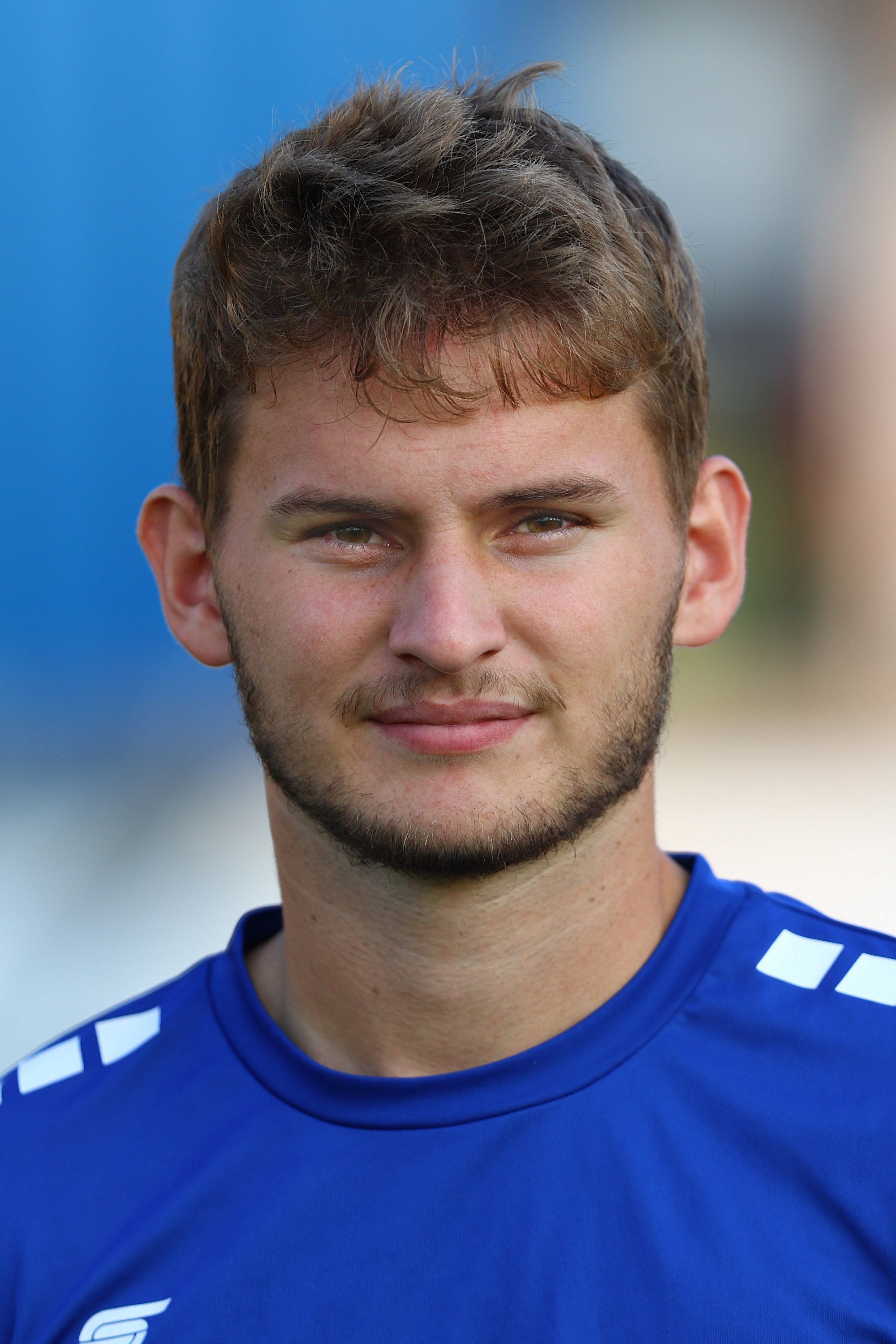
- Tartarotti with Wiener Neustadt in 2018

Personal information
- Date of birth: 2 August 1999 (age 27)
- Place of birth: Bezau, Austria
- Height: 1.70 m (5 ft 7 in)
- Position: Midfielder

Team information
- Current team: Preah Khan Reach Svay Rieng FC
- Number: 37

Youth career
- 2008–2010: VfB Bezau
- 2010–2011: FC Langenegg
- 2011–2013: VfB Bezau
- 2013–2017: AKA Vorarlberg

Senior career*
Years	Team	Apps	(Gls)
2017–2023	Rheindorf Altach II	49	(17)
2018–2023	Rheindorf Altach	78	(4)
2018–2019	→ Wiener Neustadt (loan)	19	(1)
2023–2024	SKN St. Pölten	14	(2)
2024–2026	Schwarz-Weiß Bregenz	56	(13)
2026–	Preah Khan Reach Svay Rieng FC		

International career^{‡}
2020	Austria U21	1	(0)
- * Club domestic league appearances and goals ‡ National team caps and goals as of 6 June 2022

Johannes Tartarotti (born 2 August 1999) is an Austrian professional footballer who plays as a midfielder for the Cambodian Premier League club, Preah Khan Reach Svay Rieng FC. He has represented Austria at under-21 level.

== Club career ==
=== Early years ===
Tartarotti began his career with hometown club VfB Bezau. Between 2010 and 2011 he played briefly for nearby FC Langenegg. In 2013 he joined the regional academy of AKA Vorarlberg, where he progressed through all youth teams.

=== Rheindorf Altach ===
Ahead of the 2016–17 season, he moved to the reserve team of Rheindorf Altach. He made his debut in the Austrian Regionalliga in July 2016, when he was in the starting eleven on the second matchday of that season against Austria Salzburg.

In May 2017, Tartarotti was called up for the first team for the first time for the match against Red Bull Salzburg. He made his professional debut in July 2017, when he came on as a substitute for Patrick Salomon in the first round of the Austrian Cup against FC Dornbirn. In April 2018, he finally made his debut in the Austrian Football Bundesliga when he came off the bench for Stefan Nutz in the 86th minute of the 30th matchday of the 2017–18 season against Wolfsberger AC.

In July 2018, Tartarotti was sent on loan as part of a cooperation agreement to 2. Liga club SC Wiener Neustadt.

Tartarotti departed Rheindorf Altach as his contract expired at the end of the 2022–23 Austrian Football Bundesliga season.

=== SKN St. Pölten ===
On 27 October 2023, Tartarotti signed with SKN St. Pölten.

=== Schwarz-Weiß Bregenz ===
In the summer of 2024, Tartarotti moved to Schwarz-Weiß Bregenz on a two-year contract.

=== Preah Khan Reach Svay Rieng ===
In July 2026 prior to the 2026 - 2027 Season, Johannes Tartarotti decided to take the risk and moved to Southeast Asia for the first time, and signed with Cambodian Premier League club, Preah Khan Reach Svay Rieng as an athlete reserved for the AFC Champions League 2, and the AFF Club Championship Shopee Cup. Currently, he is also registered as a Cambodian Premier League athlete according to the CPL website

== International career ==
On 17 November 2020, Tartarotti made his debut at under-21 level against Andorra, coming on as a late substitute for Hannes Wolf in a 4–0 win.
