= Till Schumacher =

German footballer (born 1997)

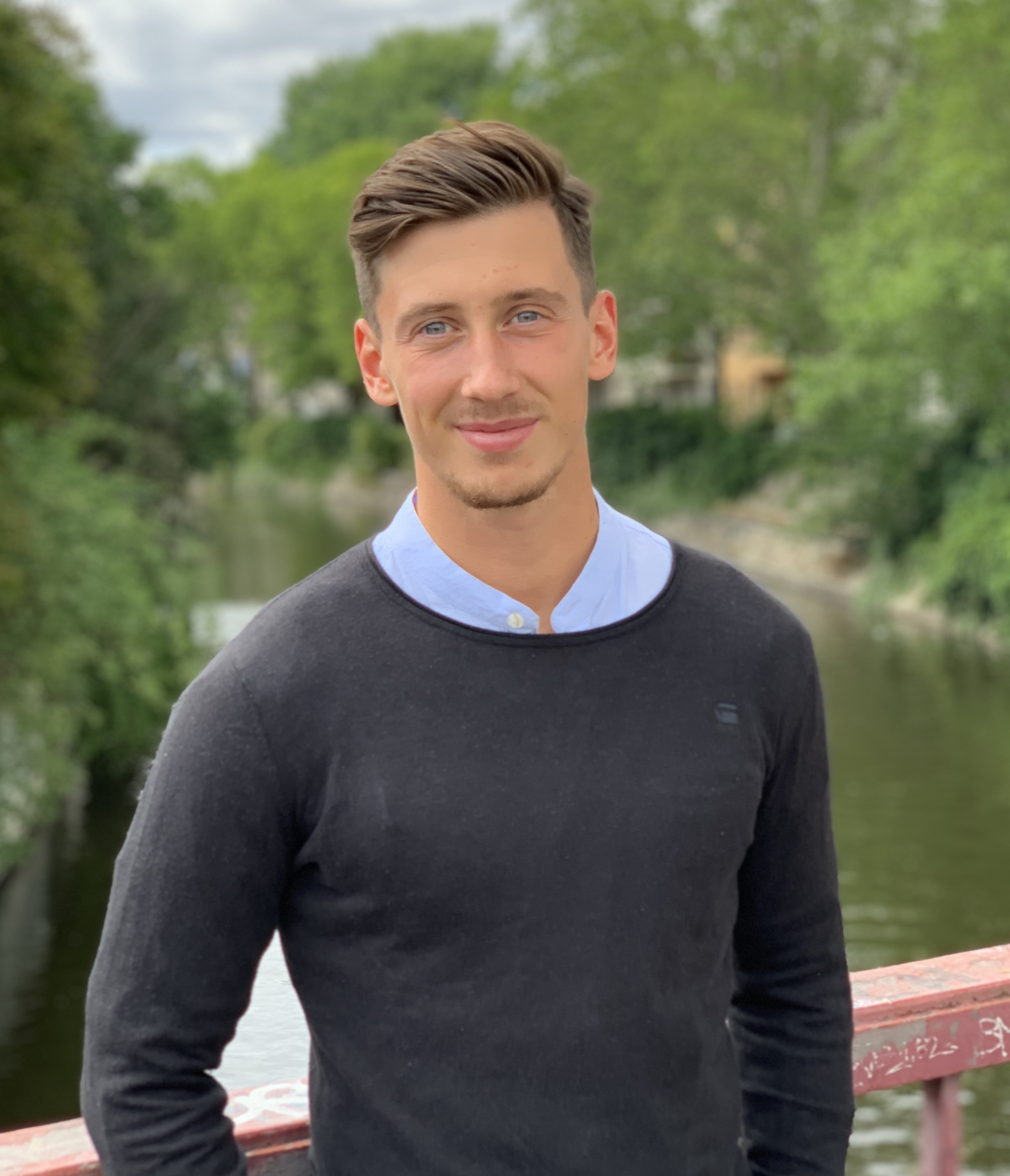
- Schumacher in 2020

Personal information
- Full name: Till Sebastian Schumacher
- Date of birth: 10 December 1997 (age 28)
- Place of birth: Essen, Germany
- Height: 1.75 m (5 ft 9 in)
- Position: Defender

Team information
- Current team: FC Augsburg II
- Number: 33

Youth career
- –2013: Rot-Weiss Essen
- 2013–2016: Borussia Dortmund

Senior career*
Years	Team	Apps	(Gls)
2016–2018	Borussia Dortmund II	16	(0)
2018	Vysočina Jihlava	19	(0)
2018–2021	Bohemians 1905	43	(2)
2021–2024	Austria Klagenfurt	77	(0)
2024–2026	1. FC Saarbrücken	26	(0)
2026–	FC Augsburg II	10	(0)

International career^{‡}
2014–2015	Germany U18	3	(0)
2015–2016	Germany U19	4	(0)
2016	Germany U20	1	(0)
- * Club domestic league appearances and goals as of 24 September 2026 ‡ National team caps and goals as of 22:25, 7 December 2019 (UTC)

Till Sebastian Schumacher (born 10 December 1997) is a German professional footballer who plays as a defender for Regionalliga Bayern club FC Augsburg II.

== Career statistics ==
=== Club ===
As of 7 December 2019.

Appearances and goals by club, season and competition
Club	Season	League			Cup		Continental		Other		Total	
Club	Season	Division	Apps	Goals	Apps	Goals	Apps	Goals	Apps	Goals	Apps	Goals
Borussia Dortmund II	2016–17	Regionalliga	16	0	0	0	–		0	0	16	0
Borussia Dortmund II	2017–18	Regionalliga	0	0	0	0	–		0	0	0	0
Borussia Dortmund II	Total		16	0	0	0	0	0	0	0	16	0
Vysočina Jihlava	2017–18	Czech First League	14	0	0	0	–		0	0	14	0
Vysočina Jihlava	2018–19	Czech National Football League	5	0	0	0	–		0	0	5	0
Vysočina Jihlava	Total		19	0	0	0	0	0	0	0	19	0
Bohemians 1905	2018–19	Czech First League	10	0	2 (Note: Appearances in the Czech Cup)	0	–		0	0	12	0
Bohemians 1905	2019–20	Czech First League	3	0	0	0	–		0	0	3	0
Bohemians 1905	Total		13	0	2	0	0	0	0	0	15	0
Career total			83	5	3	0	0	0	0	0	88	5
