= Turgay Gemicibaşi =

Turkish-German footballer (born 1996)

Personal information
- Full name: Philipp Turgay Gemicibaşi
- Date of birth: 23 April 1996 (age 30)
- Place of birth: Riesa, Germany
- Height: 1.80 m (5 ft 11 in)
- Position: Midfielder

Team information
- Current team: Admira Wacker
- Number: 8

Youth career
- 2002–2008: SC Riesa
- 2008–2012: Dynamo Dresden
- 2012–2013: 1. FC Köln
- 2013–2014: RB Leipzig
- 2014: 1. FC Kaiserslautern
- 2014–2015: Viktoria Köln

Senior career*
Years	Team	Apps	(Gls)
2014–2015	Viktoria Köln	0	(0)
2015–2016	Sportfreunde Siegen	14	(0)
2016–2017	FC Gütersloh 2000	19	(0)
2017–2019	FC Mauerwerk	54	(1)
2019–2021	FC Blau-Weiß Linz	53	(8)
2021–2024	Austria Klagenfurt	42	(9)
2022–2023	→ Kasımpaşa (loan)	6	(0)
2024	Göztepe	7	(0)
2024	Adanaspor	14	(1)
2025	SKN St. Pölten	12	(0)
2025–	Admira Wacker	27	(4)

International career
2012	Turkey U17	3	(1)
2013	Turkey U18	1	(0)
- * Club domestic league appearances and goals as of 17 May 2026

Philipp Turgay Gemicibaşi (born 23 April 1996) is a professional footballer who plays as a midfielder for Admira Wacker. Born in Germany, he is a former youth international for Turkey.

== Club career ==
In 2012, Gemicibaşi joined the youth academy of German Bundesliga side Köln but left due to indiscipline after being on the verge of signing a professional contract. After that, he joined the youth academy of RB Leipzig. However, he soon left because of not being able to adapt to living in the eastern part of Germany.

In 2014, Gemicibaşi signed for Viktoria Köln in the German fourth division from the Kaiserslautern youth academy, where he was injured.

In 2016, he signed for fifth division team Sportfreunde Siegen.

In 2017, Gemicibaşi signed for Mauerwerk in the Austrian third division.

In 2019, he signed for Austrian second division club Blau-Weiß Linz.

On 6 February 2024, Gemicibaşi signed a 1.5-year contract with Göztepe.

On 23 June 2025, Gemicibaşi signed a contract with Admira Wacker.

== International career ==
Gemicibaşi was born in Germany and is of Turkish descent. He is a youth international for Turkey, having played for the Turkey U17s and U18s.
