= Alexander Fuchs =

German footballer (born 1997)

Personal information
- Date of birth: 5 January 1997 (age 29)
- Place of birth: Munich, Germany
- Height: 1.84 m (6 ft 0 in)
- Position: Midfielder

Team information
- Current team: SV Sandhausen
- Number: 8

Youth career
- 2001–2006: SV Lohhof
- 2006–2016: 1860 Munich

Senior career*
Years	Team	Apps	(Gls)
2016–2017	1860 Munich II	20	(2)
2017–2020	1. FC Nürnberg	11	(1)
2017–2020	1. FC Nürnberg II	10	(4)
2020–2021	SpVgg Unterhaching	46	(1)
2021–2023	Austria Klagenfurt	7	(0)
2023–	SV Sandhausen	34	(0)
- * Club domestic league appearances and goals as of 24 May 2025

Alexander Fuchs (born 5 January 1997) is a German professional footballer who plays as a midfielder for 3. Liga side SV Sandhausen.
