= Emanuel Schreiner =

Austrian footballer (born 1989)

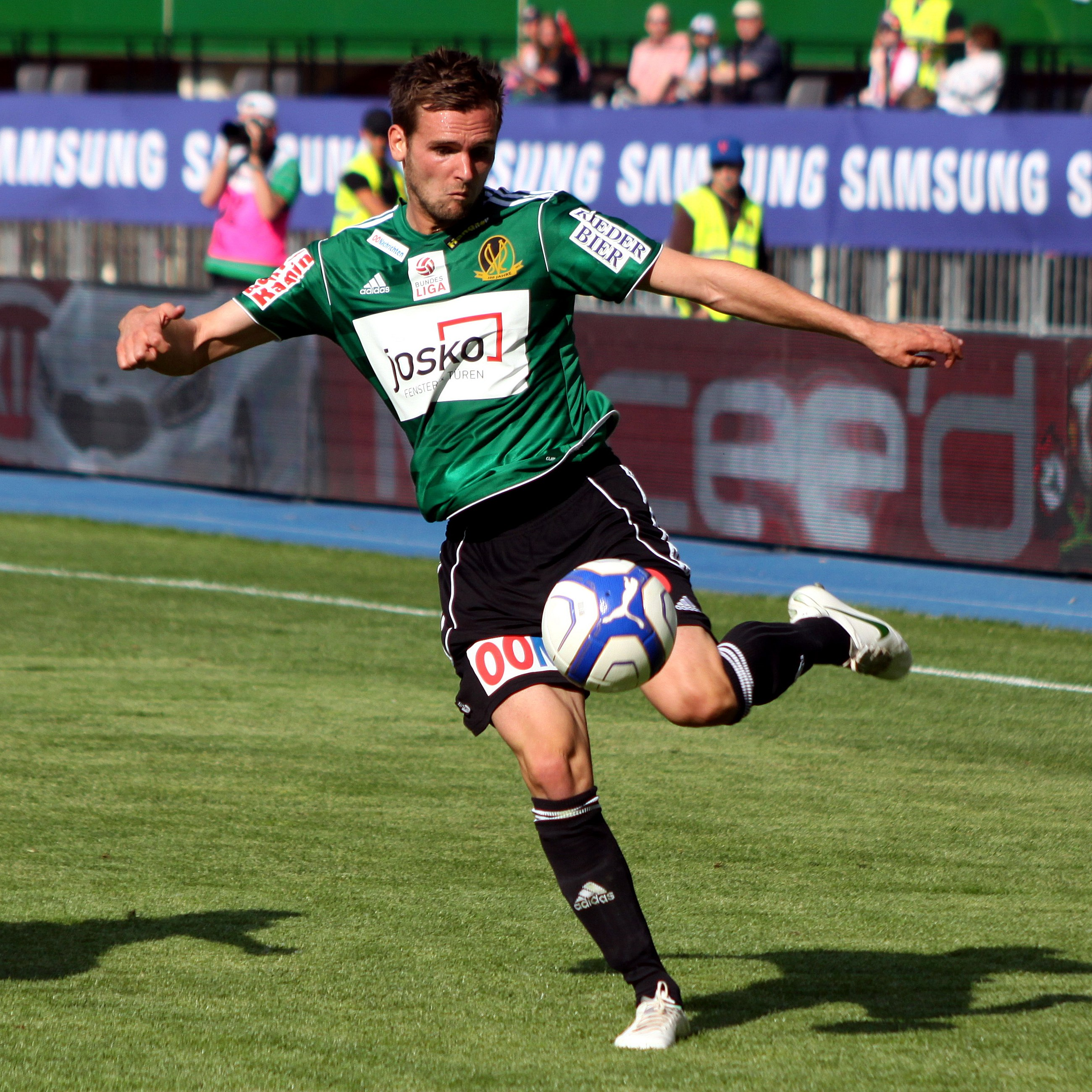

Personal information
- Date of birth: 2 February 1989 (age 37)
- Place of birth: Steyr, Austria
- Height: 1.80 m (5 ft 11 in)
- Position: Defender

Team information
- Current team: Union Weißkirchen

Senior career*
Years	Team	Apps	(Gls)
2008–2011	LASK	13	(0)
2009–2010	→ Austria Lustenau (loan)	20	(0)
2011–2013	SV Ried	46	(0)
2013–2023	Rheindorf Altach	242	(17)
2023–	Union Weißkirchen	29	(4)
- * Club domestic league appearances and goals as of 08:09, 28 July 2024 (UTC)

Emanuel Schreiner (born 2 February 1989) is an Austrian professional footballer who plays for Union Weißkirchen in the fourth-tier OÖ Liga.

== Career ==
=== LASK Linz ===
Schreiner was a product of the LASK Linz youth academy. He made his first team league debut on 12 July 2008 in a 3–1 away win against SCR Altach. He was subbed off in the 58th minute and replaced by Thomas Piermayr.

=== Austria Lustenau ===
In January 2009, Schreiner was loaned out to 1. Liga club SC Austria Lustenau. He made his league debut for the club on 14 July 2009 in a 1–0 home victory over FK Austria Wien II.

=== SV Ried ===
Following the conclusion of his loan to Austria Lustenau, Schreiner spent a year with LASK Linz, before being sold to SV Ried. His league debut for the club came on 16 July 2011 in a 1–1 home draw with SK Sturm Graz. He was subbed on for Daniel Royer in the 91st minute.

=== SCR Altach ===
In July 2013, Schreiner moved to then 1. Liga club SCR Altach. He made his league debut for the club on 19 July 2013 in a 3–2 home victory over SV Horn. He scored his first league goal for the club on 22 November 2013 in a 4–1 home victory over SC-ESV Parndorf 1919. His goal, the second of the match, came in the 7th minute.
