= Michael Blauensteiner =

Austrian footballer

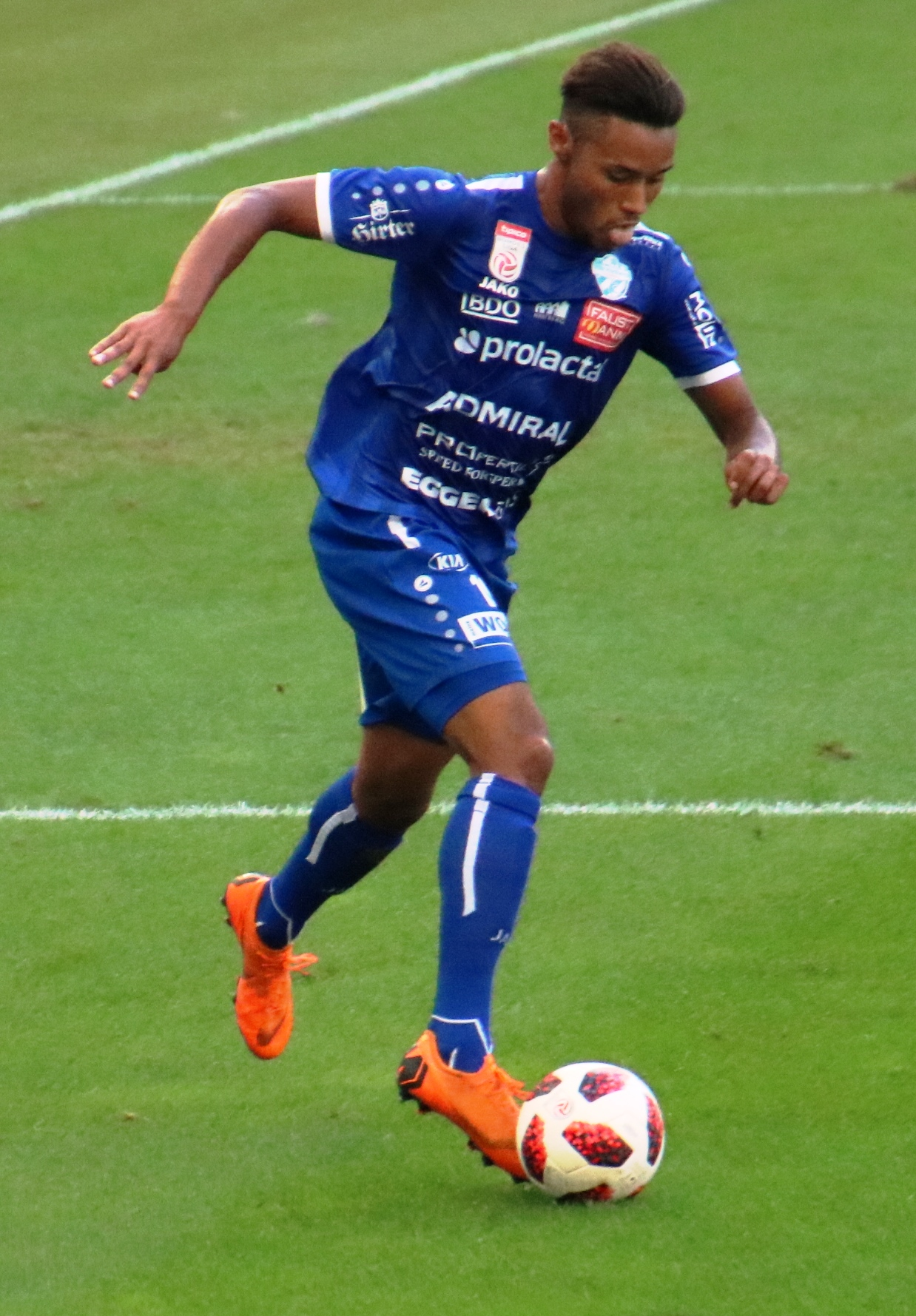

Personal information
- Date of birth: 11 February 1995 (age 31)
- Place of birth: Vienna, Austria
- Height: 1.82 m (6 ft 0 in)
- Position: Right back

Youth career
- 2003–2007: Austria Wien
- 2007–2009: FC Stadlau
- 2009–2012: Austria Wien

Senior career*
Years	Team	Apps	(Gls)
2012–2020	Young Violets	147	(12)
2017–2020	Austria Wien	11	(0)
2018–2019	→ TSV Hartberg (loan)	20	(1)
2019	→ Sūduva (loan)	8	(0)
2020–2021	SKN St. Pölten	28	(0)
2021–2023	Austria Klagenfurt	33	(1)

International career
2012–2013	Austria U-18	4	(0)
2013–2014	Austria U-19	2	(0)
2015	Austria U-20	1	(0)
- * Club domestic league appearances and goals as of 5 June 2023

Michael Blauensteiner (born 11 February 1995) is an Austrian professional footballer who plays as a defender.

== Career ==
=== Club career ===
Blauensteiner belongs to Austria Wien. He was loaned to TSV Hartberg, later to Sepsi OSK Sfântu Gheorghe. In July 2019, he was loaned out to Lithuanian Sūduva Marijampolė for the rest of 2019. After returning, he was registered for Austrias' reserve team, Young Violets.

On 15 July 2020, he agreed on a one-year contract with SKN St. Pölten.

== Personal life ==
Blauensteiner was born in Austria to an Austrian father and Cuban mother.
