= Maximiliano Moreira =

Uruguayan footballer (born 1994)

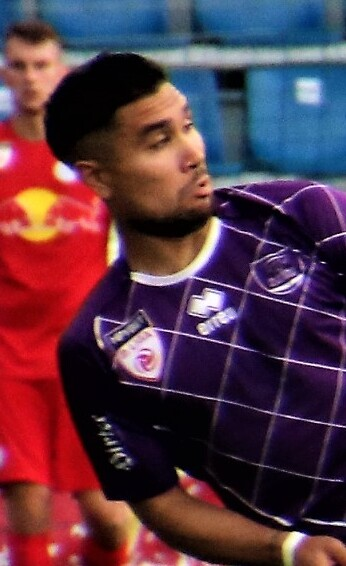
- Moreira in 2019

Personal information
- Full name: Maximiliano Moreira Romero
- Date of birth: 11 June 1994 (age 32)
- Place of birth: Maldonado, Uruguay
- Height: 1.73 m (5 ft 8 in)
- Position: Left wing-back

Team information
- Current team: Panserraikos
- Number: 69

Youth career
- Nacional

Senior career*
Years	Team	Apps	(Gls)
2013–2017	Nacional	4	(0)
2013	→ Rentistas (loan)	1	(0)
2014	→ Juventud (loan)	8	(0)
2015	→ Atenas (loan)	0	(0)
2017–2018	Huracán	25	(3)
2018	Rentistas	6	(0)
2018–2023	Austria Klagenfurt	109	(1)
2023–2024	Panserraikos	31	(0)
2024–2025	Levadiakos	28	(0)
2025	River Plate Montevideo	10	(0)
2026	Kalamata	6	(0)
2026–	Panserraikos	3	(0)

International career^{‡}
2008–2009	Uruguay U15	22	(1)
2010–2011	Uruguay U17	40	(2)
2013	Uruguay U20	11	(0)
- * Club domestic league appearances and goals as of 20 September 2026 ‡ National team caps and goals as of 03:54, 26 June 2022 (UTC)

Maximiliano Moreira Romero (born 11 June 1994) is an Uruguayan professional footballer who plays as a left-back and midfielder for Super League Greece 2 club Panserraikos.

== Club career ==
Moreira began his career with Nacional in 2013 in the Uruguayan Primera División, and shortly after joined Rentistas on loan. He joined Juventud on loan in 2014, and Atenas in 2015. He transferred to Uruguayan Segunda División side Huracán in 2017, followed by a return to Rentistas in 2018. He moved to Austria with Austria Klagenfurt in the summer of 2018. He helped Austria Klagenfurt get promoted into the Austrian Football Bundesliga for the 2021-22 season, and on 10 August 2021 extended his contract with the club until 2023.

== International career ==
Moreira is a youth international for Uruguay, having represented the Uruguay U17s at the 2011 FIFA U-17 World Cup.
