= Florian Rieder =

Austrian footballer

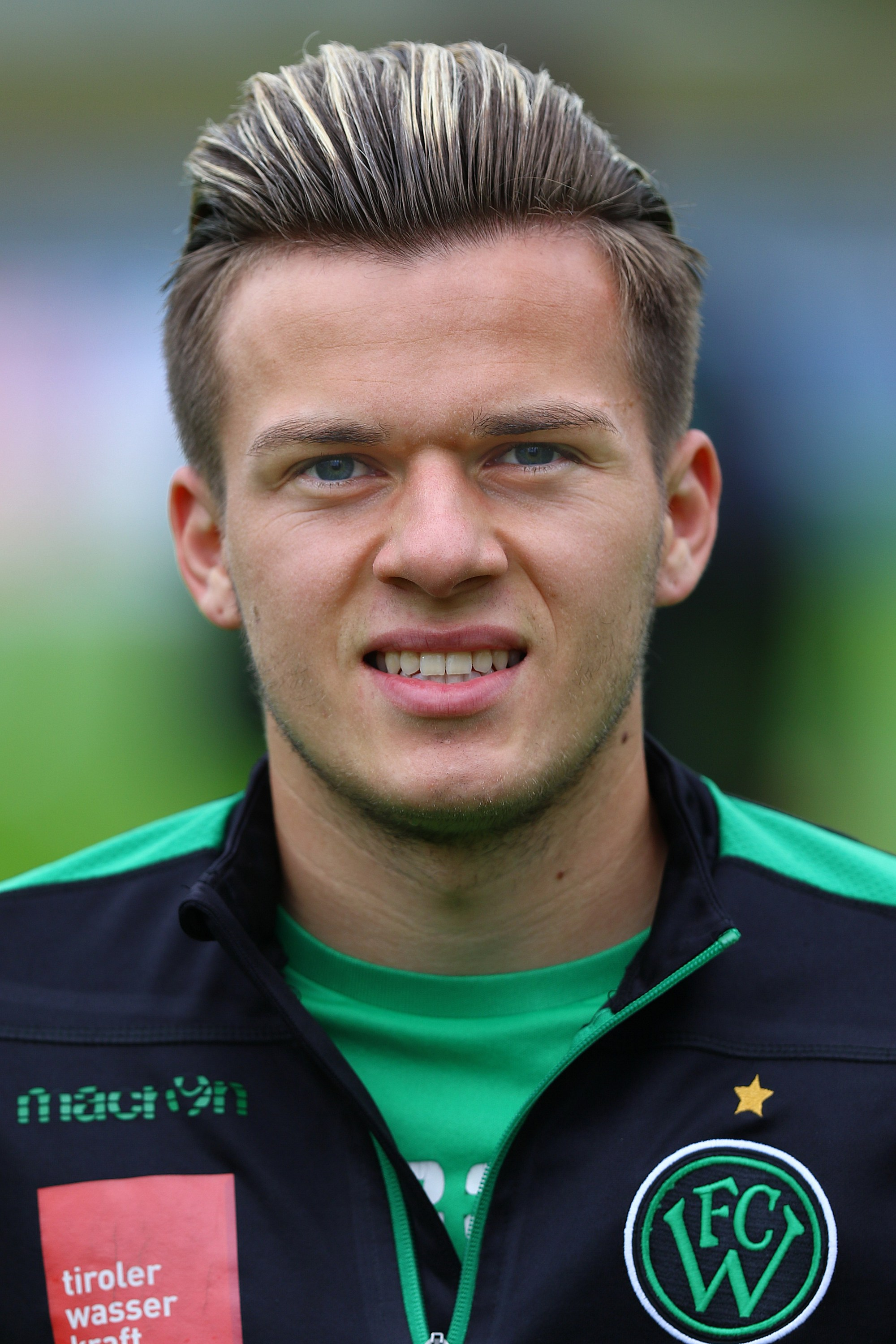

Personal information
- Date of birth: 16 May 1996 (age 30)
- Place of birth: Innsbruck, Austria
- Height: 1.76 m (5 ft 9 in)
- Position: Midfielder

Team information
- Current team: Austria Salzburg
- Number: 7

Youth career
- 2001–2005: Innsbrucker AC
- 2005–2008: FC Natters
- 2008–2009: WSG Wattens
- 2009–2010: SVG Reichenau
- 2010–2012: Innsbrucker SK
- 2012–2013: Wacker Innsbruck

Senior career*
Years	Team	Apps	(Gls)
2013–2018	Wacker Innsbruck II	98	(22)
2016–2017	→ Kufstein (loan)	16	(5)
2017–2019	Wacker Innsbruck	33	(2)
2019–2021	WSG Tirol	64	(3)
2021–2023	Austria Klagenfurt	44	(6)
2023–2024	Wolfsberger AC	22	(1)
2024–2025	WSG Tirol	10	(0)
2026–	Austria Salzburg	12	(2)
- * Club domestic league appearances and goals as of 17 May 2026

Florian Rieder (born 16 May 1996) is an Austrian professional footballer who plays as a midfielder for Austria Salzburg.

== Club career ==
On 17 May 2023, Rieder signed with Wolfsberger AC.

On 29 August 2024, he returned to WSG Tirol.
