= Patrick Hasenhüttl =

Austrian footballer

Personal information
- Date of birth: 20 May 1997 (age 29)
- Place of birth: Mechelen, Belgium
- Height: 1.90 m (6 ft 3 in)
- Position: Centre-forward

Youth career
- –2013: SpVgg Unterhaching
- 2013–2015: VfB Stuttgart
- 2015–2016: FC Ingolstadt

Senior career*
Years	Team	Apps	(Gls)
2016–2019	FC Ingolstadt II	82	(23)
2019–2020	Türkgücü München	23	(13)
2020–2022	SpVgg Unterhaching	22	(5)
2022–2023	Austria Klagenfurt	0	(0)
2022	Austria Klagenfurt II	4	(1)
2022–2023	→ VfB Oldenburg (loan)	26	(3)
2023–2024	Hallescher FC	14	(0)
Total		171	(45)

International career^{‡}
2013–2014	Austria U17	7	(1)
2014	Austria U18	2	(1)
2016	Austria U19	6	(1)
- * Club domestic league appearances and goals as of 18 March 2024 ‡ National team caps and goals as of 18:02, 25 September 2020 (UTC)

Patrick Hasenhüttl (born 20 May 1997) is an Austrian former professional footballer who played as a centre-forward.

He played senior football for Ingolstadt 04 II, Türkgücü München, SpVgg Unterhaching, Austria Klagenfurt, VfB Oldenburg and Hallescher FC. Hasenhüttl played for Austria at under-17, under-18 level and under-19 levels.

== Club career ==
Hasenhüttl played youth football for SpVgg Unterhaching before joining the youth team of VfB Stuttgart in 2013. He left VfB Stuttgart's youth team in 2015 and joined Ingolstadt 04. He made his senior debut for Ingolstadt 04's reserve side on 30 July 2016 as a substitute in a 3–1 defeat away to VfR Garching. On 2 September 2016, he scored the first goal of his senior career with his first touch after coming on as a substitute in a 2–2 draw away to 1. FC Schweinfurt 05. He made a total of 82 league appearances, in which he scored 23 goals, over three seasons with Ingolstadt 04 II.

In June 2019, he signed for Regionalliga Bayern side Türkgücü München on a free transfer. He scored 14 goals in 23 league appearances for Türkgücü München across the 2019–20 season, as they were promoted to the 3. Liga during the COVID-19 pandemic.

He returned to former youth club SpVgg Unterhaching in the summer of 2020 on a two-year contract. Hasenhüttl made his debut for the club in the 3. Liga on 25 September 2020, starting in a 1–0 home victory against VfB Lübeck.

In January 2022, Hasenhüttl signed a 2.5-year contract with Austria Klagenfurt.

He was loaned to 3. Liga club VfB Oldenburg in September 2022.

On 17 August 2023, Hasenhüttl returned to 3. Liga and signed with Hallescher FC.

On 18 March 2024, Hallescher announced that they had terminated the contract of Hasenhüttl who was retiring from football with immediate effect for health reasons.

== International career ==
Hasenhüttl has represented Austria internationally at under-17 level, under-18 level and under-19 levels. He appeared for Austria at the 2016 UEFA European Under-19 Championship.

== Personal life ==
He is the son of former professional footballer and former Southampton and RB Leipzig manager Ralph Hasenhüttl. He was born in Mechelen, Belgium as his father was playing for KV Mechelen at the time, but has represented Austria in youth international football. He also holds German citizenship.
