= 2026–27 FC Red Bull Salzburg season =

Red Bull Salzburg
2026–27 season
- Chairman: Harald Lürzer
- Head coach: Danny Röhl
- Stadium: Red Bull Arena
- Bundesliga: 2nd
- Austrian Cup: Third round
- UEFA Europa League: League stage
- Top goalscorer: League: Karim Konaté (3); All: Haris Tabaković (8)
Home colours	Away colours

The 2026–27 season is the 94th season in the history of Red Bull Salzburg, and the club's 38th consecutive season in the top flight of Austrian football. In addition to the domestic league, the club participates in the Austrian Cup and the UEFA Europa League.

== Coaching staff ==
As of 22 August 2026

Position	Staff
Head coach	(Germany) Danny Röhl
Assistant coach	(Luxembourg) Raphael Duarte (Germany) Sascha Lense (Germany) Sebastian Heidinger
Goalkeeper coach	(Germany) Alexander Walke
Athletic coach	(Germany) Markus Böker
Rehab coach	(United States) Scott Eisele
Match analyst	(Austria) Rainer Sonnberger (Germany) Tristan Steiner

== Players ==
=== First-team squad ===
As of 2 September 2026

Note: Flags indicate national team as defined under FIFA eligibility rules; some limited exceptions apply. Players may hold more than one non-FIFA nationality.

No.	Pos.	Nation	Player
1	GK	GER	Christian Früchtl
4	DF	SWE	John Mellberg
5	MF	MLI	Soumaïla Diabaté
7	MF	GER	Umut Tohumcu (on loan from TSG Hoffenheim)
8	MF	JPN	Sōta Kitano
9	FW	BIH	Haris Tabaković
11	FW	BEL	Yorbe Vertessen
13	DF	GER	Frans Krätzig
15	MF	POL	Bartosz Mazurek
18	DF	AUT	Nikolas Veratschnig
19	FW	CIV	Karim Konaté
20	FW	GHA	Edmund Baidoo
21	DF	GER	Tim Drexler
22	DF	AUT	Stefan Lainer
23	FW	HUN	Damir Redzic

No.	Pos.	Nation	Player
27	MF	AUT	Johannes Moser
28	MF	SRB	Filip Matijašević
30	FW	MLI	Gaoussou Diakité
31	DF	SUI	Dominik Schmid
32	MF	GAM	Abubakr Barry
33	FW	BFA	Aboubacar Camara
35	FW	DEN	Jesper Lindstrøm (on loan from Napoli)
36	MF	AUT	Justin Omoregie
39	DF	GER	Leandro Morgalla
41	GK	AUT	Nikola Šarčević
43	FW	SUI	Enrique Aguilar
44	DF	TOG	Kévin Boma
47	DF	AUT	Valentin Zabransky
52	GK	AUT	Christian Zawieschitzky
91	DF	JPN	Anrie Chase

=== Out on loan ===
As of 1 September 2026

Note: Flags indicate national team as defined under FIFA eligibility rules; some limited exceptions apply. Players may hold more than one non-FIFA nationality.

No.	Pos.	Nation	Player
—	DF	GER	Hendry Blank (at Greuther Fürth until 30 June 2027)
—	DF	BFA	Lassina Traoré (at FC Liefering until 30 June 2027)
—	DF	AUT	Tim Trummer (at Grazer AK until 30 June 2027)
—	MF	DEN	Clement Bischoff (at NEC until 30 June 2027)

No.	Pos.	Nation	Player
—	MF	CRO	Oliver Lukić (at TSV Hartberg until 30 June 2027)
—	MF	COL	Mayker Palacios (at FC Liefering until 30 June 2027)
—	FW	VEN	Yerwin Sulbarán (at FC Liefering until 30 June 2027)

== Transfers ==
=== In ===
Date	Pos.	Player	From	Fee	Ref.
9 June 2026	DF	(Austria) Nikolas Veratschnig	(Germany) Mainz 05	€3,500,000	
12 June 2026	DF	(Switzerland) Dominik Schmid	(Switzerland) FC Basel	€3,000,000	
23 June 2026	DF	(Togo) Kévin Boma	(Portugal) Estoril	€7,000,000	
29 June 2026	MF	(The Gambia) Abubakr Barry	Austria Wien	€3,000,000	
30 June 2026	DF	(Germany) Hendry Blank	(Germany) Hannover 96	Loan return	
30 June 2026	DF	(Brazil) Douglas Mendes	(Austria) FC Liefering	Loan return	
30 June 2026	DF	(Germany) Leandro Morgalla	(Germany) VfL Bochum	Loan return	
30 June 2026	MF	(England) Bobby Clark	(England) Derby County	Loan return	
30 June 2026	MF	(France) Lucas Gourna-Douath	(France) Le Havre	Loan return	
30 June 2026	MF	(Austria) Zeteny Jano	(Austria) Grazer AK	Loan return	
30 June 2026	FW	(Denmark) Adam Daghim	(Germany) VfL Wolfsburg	Loan return	
30 June 2026	FW	(Mali) Gaoussou Diakité	(Switzerland) Lausanne-Sport	Loan return	
30 June 2026	FW	(Burkina Faso) Aboubacar Camara	(Austria) FC Liefering	Loan return	
1 July 2026	MF	(Poland) Bartosz Mazurek	(Poland) Jagiellonia	€6,000,000	
1 July 2026 (Note: Transfer was originally agreed on 26 April, but was not finalised until 1 July)	MF	(Serbia) Filip Matijašević	(Serbia) Čukarički	€4,000,000	
1 July 2026 (Note: Transfer was originally agreed on 23 April, but was not finalised until 1 July)	FW	(Venezuela) Yerwin Sulbarán	(Venezuela) Monagas	€2,000,000	
11 July 2026	FW	(Bosnia and Herzegovina) Haris Tabaković	(Germany) TSG Hoffenheim	€5,000,000	
5 August 2026	GK	(Germany) Christian Früchtl	(Italy) Lecce	€1,000,000	
14 August 2026	MF	(Germany) Umut Tohumcu	(Germany) TSG Hoffenheim	Loan	
1 September 2026	FW	(Denmark) Jesper Lindstrøm	(Italy) Napoli	Loan	
3 January 2027 (Note: Transfer was originally agreed on 25 January 2026, but was not finalised until 3 January 2027)	DF	(Zambia) Jonathan Kalimina	(Zambia) Kafue Celtic	Undisclosed	
11 January 2027 (Note: Transfer was originally agreed on 24 July 2026, but was not finalised until 11 January 2027)	MF	(Slovenia) Tim Ruznić	(Slovenia) FC Koper	€1,200,000	

=== Out ===
Date	Pos.	Player	To	Fee	Ref.
12 May 2026	DF	(France) Joane Gadou	(Germany) Borussia Dortmund	€19,500,000	
15 May 2026	DF	(Austria) Jannik Schuster	(England) Brentford	€18,000,000	
18 June 2026	DF	(Austria) Tim Trummer	(Austria) Grazer AK	Loan	
22 June 2026	MF	(England) Bobby Clark	(England) Derby County	€8,000,000	
25 June 2026	GK	(Austria) Salko Hamzić	(Austria) WSG Tirol	Undisclosed	
1 July 2026	MF	(Denmark) Mads Bidstrup	(France) Lyon	€10,500,000	
1 July 2026	FW	(Mali) Moussa Yeo	(Wales) Swansea City	€6,000,000	
1 July 2026	FW	(Austria) Karim Onisiwo		Released	
1 July 2026	FW	(Venezuela) Yerwin Sulbarán	(Austria) FC Liefering	Loan	
1 July 2026 (Note: Transfer was originally agreed on 27 March, but was not finalised until 1 July)	FW	(Bosnia and Herzegovina) Kerim Alajbegović	(Germany) Bayer Leverkusen	€8,000,000	
5 July 2026	DF	(Brazil) Douglas Mendes	(Brazil) Vila Nova	Free	
10 July 2026	GK	(Austria) Alexander Schlager	(Germany) Werder Bremen	Free	
22 July 2026	FW	(Denmark) Clement Bischoff	(Netherlands) NEC Nijmegen	Loan	
25 July 2026	MF	(Japan) Takumu Kawamura	(Japan) Sanfrecce Hiroshima	Undisclosed	
25 July 2026	MF	(Croatia) Oliver Lukić	(Austria) TSV Hartberg	Loan	
27 July 2026	MF	(Austria) Valentin Sulzbacher	(Netherlands) Excelsior	Undisclosed	
3 August 2026	FW	(Denmark) Adam Daghim	(Germany) TSG Hoffenheim	€13,000,000	
11 August 2026	MF	(Austria) Zeteny Jano	(Germany) SSV Jahn Regensburg	Undisclosed	
13 August 2026	MF	(Mali) Mamady Diambou	(France) Brest	Undisclosed	
14 August 2026	DF	(Serbia) Aleksa Terzić	(Italy) Frosinone	€2,500,000	
15 August 2026	MF	(France) Lucas Gourna-Douath	(England) Hull City	€4,000,000	
1 September 2026	DF	(Germany) Hendry Blank	(Germany) Greuther Fürth	Loan	
1 September 2026	MF	(Denmark) Maurits Kjærgaard	(France) Lille	€8,000,000	
11 January 2027	MF	(Slovenia) Tim Ruznić	(Austria) FC Liefering	Loan	

== Friendlies ==
26 June 2026 Friendly	SV Seekirchen	0–5	Red Bull Salzburg
19:00 CEST (UTC+2)		Report	Konaté 10', 34'; Redzic 37'; Camara 47'; Vertessen 69'

4 July 2026 Friendly	Red Bull Salzburg	2–1	Górnik Zabrze	Salzburg
10:00 CEST (UTC+2)	Veratschnig 24'; Konaté 56'	Report	Massimo 54'	Stadium: SAK Arena Nonntal

9 July 2026 Friendly	Red Bull Salzburg	4–0	FC Kharkiv	Saalfelden
16:30 CEST (UTC+2)	Baidoo 29'; Veratschnig 40'; Diakité 51'; Schmid 86'	Report

15 July 2026 Friendly	Red Bull Salzburg	0–3	Gamba Osaka	Anif
14:00 CEST (UTC+2)		Report	Jebali 18', 23'; Hümmet 45+9'

15 July 2026 Friendly	Red Bull Salzburg	1–2	İstanbul Başakşehir	Salzburg
17:30 CEST (UTC+2)	Daghim 54'	Report	Yıldırım 40'; Turhan 88'

18 July 2026 Friendly	Red Bull Salzburg	Cancelled	Mamelodi Sundowns
17:00 CEST (UTC+2)		Report
Note: Cancelled due to the passing of Jayden Adams.

== Competitions ==
=== Overall record ===
Competition	First match	Last match	Starting round	Record							
Competition	First match	Last match	Starting round	Pld	W	D	L	GF	GA	GD	Win %
Bundesliga	1 August 2026		Matchday 1	7	5	2	0	18	4	+14	71.43
Austrian Cup	25 July 2026		First round	2	2	0	0	10	1	+9	100.00
UEFA Europa League	6 August 2026		Third qualifying round	5	4	1	0	9	3	+6	80.00
Total				14	11	3	0	37	8	+29	78.57

Source: Soccerway

=== Bundesliga ===
==== League table ====
Pos	Team	Pld	W	D	L	GF	GA	GD	Pts	Qualification
1	SK Rapid	12	11	0	1	39	9	+30	33	Qualification for the Championship round
2	Red Bull Salzburg	12	9	3	0	33	9	+24	30	Qualification for the Championship round
3	LASK	12	8	1	3	30	15	+15	25	Qualification for the Championship round
4	TSV Hartberg	12	6	2	4	23	19	+4	20	Qualification for the Championship round
5	Sturm Graz	12	5	4	3	22	17	+5	19	Qualification for the Championship round

Updated to match(es) played on 8 November 2026. Source: Austrian Football Bundesliga
Rules for classification: 1) Points; 2) Head-to-head record; 3) Goal difference; 4) Goals scored; 5) Matches won; 6) Away matches won; 7) Away goals scored.

==== Results summary ====
Overall								Home						Away					
Pld	W	D	L	GF	GA	GD	Pts	W	D	L	GF	GA	GD	W	D	L	GF	GA	GD
9	6	3	0	21	4	+17	21	5	0	0	16	2	+14	1	3	0	5	2	+3

Last updated: 18 October 2026.
Source: Austrian Football Bundesliga

==== Results by round ====
Round	1	2	3	4	5	6	7	8	9
Ground	H	A	A	H	H	A	H	A	H
Result	W	D	W	W	W	D	W	D	H
Position	4	4	3	2	2	3	2	2	2

Updated to match(es) played on 18 October 2026. Source: Austrian Football Bundesliga
A = Away; H = Home; W = Win; D = Draw; L = Loss

==== Matches ====
Win Draw Loss Fixtures

1 August 2026 1	Red Bull Salzburg	1–0	TSV Hartberg	Salzburg
19:30 CEST (UTC+2)	Konaté 89'	Report		Stadium: Red Bull Arena; Attendance: 7,735; Referee: Alain Sadikovski

9 August 2026 2	Wolfsberger AC	1–1	Red Bull Salzburg	Wolfsberg
17:00 CEST (UTC+2)	Diabaté (yellow card) 52'; Vrioni 67'; Sulzner (yellow card) 69'; Schriebl (yellow card) 78'; Mamageishvili (yellow card) 90+6'; Renner (yellow card) 90+7'	Report	Camara (yellow card) 7'; Vertessen 79'	Stadium: Lavanttal-Arena; Attendance: 5,351; Referee: Isa Simsek

16 August 2026 3	WSG Tirol	0–3	Red Bull Salzburg	Innsbruck
17:00 CEST (UTC+2)	Gschösser (yellow card) 22'; Hinterseer (penalty missed) 45+4'; Olakigbe (yellow card) 50'; Čelić (yellow card) 90+2'	Report	Konaté 15'; Krätzig 17'; Kitano 70'	Stadium: Tivoli Stadion Tirol; Attendance: 3,720; Referee: Christian-Petru Ciochirca

30 August 2026 4	Red Bull Salzburg	4–1	Austria Wien	Salzburg
19:00 CEST (UTC+2)	K. Lee 13' (o.g.); Tabaković 19'; Mazurek 31'; Schmid (yellow card) 39'; Vertessen 55'	Report	Fischer 47'; Schablas (yellow card) 90+3'	Stadium: Red Bull Arena; Attendance: 10,531; Referee: Walter Altmann

2 September 2026 5	Red Bull Salzburg	5–1	Rapid Wien	Salzburg
19:00 CEST (UTC+2)	Tabaković 4', 21'; Veratschnig 15'; Baidoo 46'; Konaté 90'		Seidl 51'; Cvetković (yellow card) 69'	Stadium: Red Bull Arena; Referee: Jakob Semler

11 September 2026 6	SV Ried	1–1	Red Bull Salzburg	Ried im Innkreis
19:30 CEST (UTC+2)	Schwab (yellow card) 66'; Pomer 86'; Boguo (yellow card) 90+3'; Konaté 90'		Kitano (yellow card) 64'; Barry (yellow card) 66'; Konaté 84'; Veratschnig (yellow card) 90+3'	Stadium: Keine Sorgen Arena; Attendance: 6,041; Referee: Julian Schnur

20 September 2026 7	Red Bull Salzburg	3–0	Sturm Graz	Salzburg
17:00 CEST (UTC+2)	Veratschnig 72'; Boma 77'; Camara 83'		Heil (yellow card) 72' (red card) 76'; Koller (yellow card) 79'	Stadium: Red Bull Arena; Attendance: 12,631; Referee: Isa Simsek

10 October 2026 8	Grazer AK	0–0	Red Bull Salzburg	Graz
17:00 CEST (UTC+2)	Italiano (yellow card) 89'		Barry (yellow card) 55'; Drexler (yellow card) 64'	Stadium: Liebenauer Stadium; Attendance: 7,368; Referee: Stefan Ebner

18 October 2026 9	Red Bull Salzburg	3–0	SCR Altach	Salzburg
14:30 CEST (UTC+2)	Tabaković 6'; Lindstrøm 73'; Redzic 90'		Milojević (yellow card) 84'	Stadium: Red Bull Arena; Attendance: 7,254; Referee: Alain Sadikovski

=== Austrian Cup ===
Win Draw Loss Fixtures

25 July 2026 First round	SV Klöcher Bau Oberwart	1–7	Red Bull Salzburg	Oberwart
18:00 CEST (UTC+2)	Hutter 35'; Woth (yellow card) 57'; Pauliny (yellow card) 85'	Report	Baidoo 7'; Vertessen 11'; Diakité 33' (pen.), (yellow card) 41'; Redzic 54', 89'; Veratschnig 76'; Kitano 85'	Stadium: Oberwart-Informstadion; Attendance: 2,500; Referee: Cagri Demir

6 September 2026 Second round	SKN St. Pölten	0–3	Red Bull Salzburg	Sankt Pölten
17:00 CEST (UTC+2)	Mané (yellow card) 53'	Report	Tabaković 22'; Camara 31'; Mazurek 50'	Stadium: NV Arena; Attendance: 3,894; Referee: Alain Sadikovski

27 October 2026 Third round	Schwarz-Weiß Bregenz	2-3	Red Bull Salzburg	Bregenz
18:00 CEST (UTC +02:00)	Omotehera 33, Cecchini 59	Report	Konate 2', Vertessen 43', Lainer 57'	Stadium: ImmoAgentur Stadion; Attendance: 1,600; Referee: Achim Untergasser

9 February 2027 Quarter-final	LASK	v	Red Bull Salzburg	Linz, Austria
				Stadium: Raiffeisen Arena

=== UEFA Europa League ===
==== Third qualifying round ====
The draw for the third qualifying round was held on 20 July 2026.

6 August 2026 First leg	Red Bull Salzburg (Austria)	1–0	(Cyprus) Pafos	Salzburg, Austria
19:00 CEST (UTC+2)	Barry (yellow card) 75'; Tabaković 88'	Report	David Luiz (yellow card) 36'; Sema (yellow card) 46' (yellow-red card) 90+3'; Šunjić (yellow card) 82'	Stadium: Red Bull Arena; Attendance: 7,704; Referee: Damian Sylwestrzak (Poland)

13 August 2026 Second leg	Pafos (Cyprus)	3–3 (3–4 agg.)	(Austria) Red Bull Salzburg	Limassol, Cyprus
21:00 EEST (UTC+3)	Lelê 15'; Biel Teixeira 37'; Bruno (yellow card) 48'; Mammadov 84'	Report	Veratschnig (yellow card) 36'; Tabaković 54', 58' (pen.), 70'	Stadium: Limassol Stadium; Attendance: 6,183; Referee: João Pinheiro (Portugal)

==== Play-off round ====
The draw for the play-off round was held on 3 August 2026.

20 August 2026 First leg	Mjällby (Sweden)	0–1	(Austria) Red Bull Salzburg	Solvesborg, Sweden
20:00 CEST (UTC+2)	Samuelsen (yellow card) 58'	Report	Pettersson 90+2' (o.g.)	Stadium: Strandvallen; Attendance: 3,079; Referee: Mykola Balakin (Ukraine)

27 August 2026 Second leg	Red Bull Salzburg (Austria)	3–0 (4–0 agg.)	(Sweden) Mjällby	Salzburg, Austria
20:00 CEST (UTC+2)	Konaté 61', 67'; Tabaković 80'	Report	Gustafson (yellow card) 19'; Granath (yellow card) 22'; Bergström (yellow card) 45'	Stadium: Red Bull Arena; Attendance: 7,654; Referee: Irfan Peljto (Bosnia and Herzegovina)

==== League phase ====
Red Bull Salzburg were in Pot 2 for the league phase draw, which was held on 28 August 2026. Red Bull Salzburg were randomly drawn to play Milan and Bayer Leverkusen from Pot 1, Sparta Prague and Anderlecht from Pot 2, Crystal Palace and Celje from Pot 3, and finally Ararat-Armenia and Levski Sofia from Pot 4.

===== League phase table =====
Pos	Team	Pld	W	D	L	GF	GA	GD	Pts	Qualification
24	(Austria) Sturm Graz	4	1	1	2	3	6	−3	4	Advance to knockout phase play-offs (unseeded)
25	(Slovenia) Celje	4	1	1	2	5	9	−4	4	
26	(Austria) Red Bull Salzburg	4	1	1	2	3	8	−5	4	
27	(Spain) Celta Vigo	4	1	0	3	4	6	−2	3	
28	(Italy) Milan	4	1	0	3	4	7	−3	3	

Updated to match(es) played on 5 November 2026. Source: UEFA
Rules for classification: League phase tiebreakers

===== Results summary =====
Overall								Home						Away					
Pld	W	D	L	GF	GA	GD	Pts	W	D	L	GF	GA	GD	W	D	L	GF	GA	GD
4	1	1	2	3	8	−5	4	0	0	1	0	4	−4	1	1	1	3	4	−1

Last updated: 5 November 2026.
Source: UEFA

===== Results by round =====
Round	1	2	3	4	5	6	7	8
Ground	A	H	A	A	H	H	A	H
Result	W	L	D	L				
Position	14		21					
Points	3	3	4	4				

Updated to match(es) played on 5 November 2026. Source: UEFA
A = Away; H = Home; W = Win; D = Draw; L = Loss; P = Postponed

===== Matches =====
Win Draw Loss Fixtures

17 September 2026 1	Levski Sofia (Bulgaria)	0–1	(Austria) Red Bull Salzburg	Sofia, Bulgaria
19:45 UTC+3	Centelles (yellow card) 55'		Tabaković 39', (yellow card) 56'; Kitano (yellow card) 41'; Mazurek (yellow card) 60'; Vertessen (yellow card) 65'; Barry (yellow card) 90+3'	Stadium: Stadion Georgi Asparuhov; Attendance: 22,378; Referee: Mohammad Al-Emara (Finland)

15 October 2026 2	Red Bull Salzburg (Austria)	0–4	(Italy) Milan	Wals-Siezenheim, Austria
18:45 UTC+2	Zabransky (yellow card) 40'	Report	Cisse 15', 32', 49'; Hutchinson (yellow card) 21'; Ramos 72'; Terracciano (red card) 84'	Stadium: Stadion Salzburg; Attendance: 22,503; Referee: Horațiu Feşnic (Romania)

22 October 2026 3	Celje (Slovenia)	2–2	(Austria) Red Bull Salzburg	Celje, Slovenia
21:00 UTC+2	Tutyškinas (yellow card) 32'; Širvys (yellow card) 43'; Kramer 50'; Kučys 90'	Report	Kitano 9'; Redzic (yellow card) 35'; Lindstrøm 46'; Mazurek (yellow card) 90+2'	Stadium: Stadion Z'dežele; Referee: John Brooks (England)

5 November 2026 4	Anderlecht (Belgium)	2–0	(Austria) Red Bull Salzburg	Brussels, Belgium
18:45 UTC+1	Augustinsson 20'; Stroeykens (yellow card) 28'; Maamar (yellow card) 78'; Pétrot (yellow card) 83'; Winkler 90', (yellow card) 90+6'	Report	Baidoo (yellow card) 35'; Tabaković (yellow card) 45'; Zabransky (yellow card) 66'	Stadium: Constant Vanden Stock Stadium; Referee: Elchin Masiyev (Azerbaijan)

26 November 2026 5	Red Bull Salzburg (Austria)	v	Ararat-Armenia	Wals-Siezenheim, Austria
18:45 UTC+1				Stadium: Stadion Salzburg

10 December 2026 6	Red Bull Salzburg (Austria)	v	(Czech Republic) Sparta Prague	Wals-Siezenheim, Austria
21:00 UTC+1				Stadium: Stadion Salzburg

21 January 2027 7	Bayer Leverkusen (Germany)	v	(Austria) Red Bull Salzburg	Leverkusen, Germany
21:00 UTC+1				Stadium: BayArena

28 January 2027 8	Red Bull Salzburg (Austria)	v	(England) Crystal Palace	Wals-Siezenheim, Austria
21:00 UTC+1				Stadium: Stadion Salzburg

== Statistics ==
=== Goalscorers ===
Rank	No.	Pos.	Player	Austrian Bundesliga	Austrian Cup	Europa League	Total
1	9	FW	(Bosnia and Herzegovina) Haris Tabaković	1	1	6	8
2	19	FW	(Ivory Coast) Karim Konaté	3	0	2	5
3	11	FW	(Belgium) Yorbe Vertessen	2	1	0	3
4	8	MF	(Japan) Sota Kitano	1	1	0	2
5	15	MF	(Poland) Bartosz Mazurek	1	1	0	2
6	18	MF	(Austria) Nikolas Veratschnig	1	1	0	2
7	33	FW	(Burkina Faso) Aboubacar Camara	1	1	0	2
8	23	FW	(Hungary) Damir Redzic	0	2	0	2
9	13	DF	(Germany) Frans Krätzig	1	0	0	1
10	44	DF	(Togo) Kévin Boma	1	0	0	1
11	20	FW	(Ghana) Edmund Baidoo	0	1	0	1
12	30	FW	(Mali) Gaoussou Diakité	0	1	0	1

==== Hat-tricks ====
- Score – The score at the time of each goal. Salzburg's score listed first.

Date	No.	Pos.	Player	Score	Final score	Opponent	Competition
13 August 2026	9	FW	(Bosnia and Herzegovina) Haris Tabaković	1–2	3–3	Pafos	Europa League
13 August 2026	9	FW	(Bosnia and Herzegovina) Haris Tabaković	2–2	3–3	Pafos	Europa League
13 August 2026	9	FW	(Bosnia and Herzegovina) Haris Tabaković	3–2	3–3	Pafos	Europa League
