= Edmund Baidoo =

Ghanaian footballer

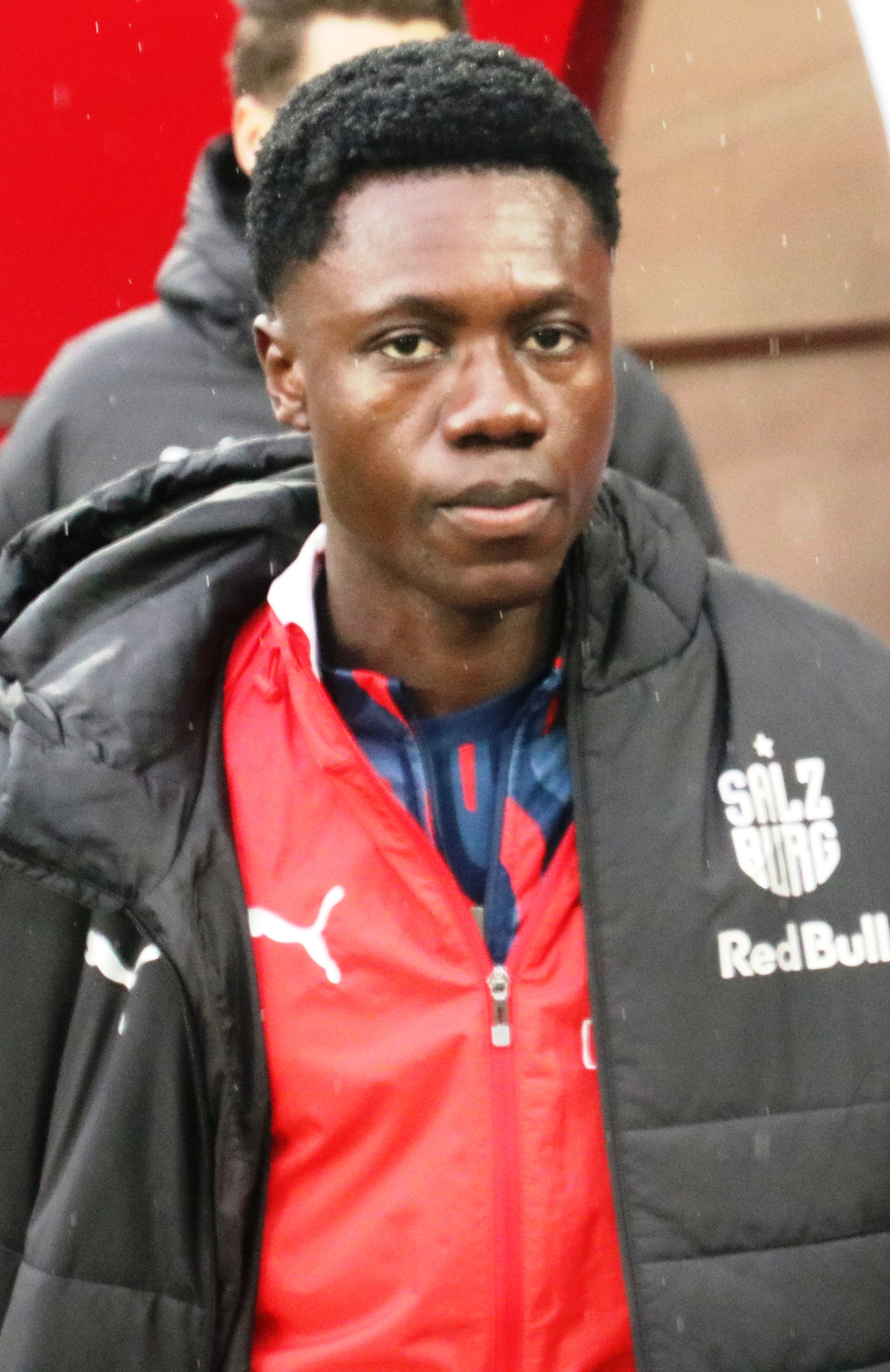
- Baidoo with Red Bull Salzburg in 2025

Personal information
- Date of birth: 30 January 2006 (age 20)
- Place of birth: Ghana
- Height: 1.74 m (5 ft 9 in)
- Position: Winger

Team information
- Current team: Red Bull Salzburg
- Number: 20

Youth career
- –2024: Asanska

Senior career*
Years	Team	Apps	(Gls)
2024	Sogndal	19	(7)
2024–	Red Bull Salzburg	53	(10)
- * Club domestic league appearances and goals as of 19:14, 25 October 2026 (UTC)

Edmund Baidoo (born 30 January 2006) is a Ghanaian professional footballer who plays as a winger for Austrian Bundesliga club Red Bull Salzburg.

== Club career ==
=== Sogndal ===
Sogndal began scouting Ghanaian players in the early 2010s, when director of sports Håvard Flo brought Gilbert Koomson and Mahatma Otoo to Fosshaugane. Flo maintained his network over the next decade, and managed to sign Edmund Baidoo in the winter of 2024, owing to Flo's "relations" in Ghana as well as "a solid dose of luck". Edmund Baidoo joined Sogndal's training camp in the winter of 2024, and as well as impressing skill-wise, he seemed to be able to integrate into Norwegian football. He was signed from Asanska as a winger to operated wide in the field, as opposed to Sogndal's now-sold winger Sondre Ørjasæter who usually sought space centrally. Baidoo was also compared to Akor Adams, who joined Sogndal from West Africa at a similar age. Baidoo had never travelled outside of Ghana.

He made his league debut for Sogndal against newly relegated Vålerenga, and immediately made his mark with an assist. When Baidoo scored again in the third match of the season, Sogn Avis spotted player agent Jim Solbakken as well as representatives of Bodø/Glimt, Brann and Molde in the stands. In May 2024, Expressen reported an alleged interest in Baidoo from Malmö FF. Belgian media reported on interest from that country. Baidoo proceeded to score the winning goal against Lyn in Sogndal's first away victory of the year, in June. In the next match, scoring one goal and having the assist to the other led to the commentator calling Baidoo a "jewel".

=== Red Bull Salzburg ===
On 29 August 2024, Baidoo joined Austrian Bundesliga side Red Bull Salzburg on a permanent deal, signing a five-year contract.

== Career statistics ==
As of match played 28 October 2026

Appearances and goals by club, season and competition
Club	Season	League			National cup (Note: Includes Norwegian Football Cup, Austrian Cup)		Europe		Other		Total	
Club	Season	Division	Apps	Goals	Apps	Goals	Apps	Goals	Apps	Goals	Apps	Goals
Sogndal	2024	Norwegian First Division	19	7	1	0	—		—		20	7
Red Bull Salzburg	2024–25	Austrian Bundesliga	18	4	3	1	0	0	3 (Note: Appearances in FIFA Club World Cup)	0	24	4
Red Bull Salzburg	2025–26	Austrian Bundesliga	27	5	5	0	12 (Note: Four appearances and one goal in UEFA Champions League, eight appearances and one goal in UEFA Europa League)	2	—		44	7
Red Bull Salzburg	2026–27	Austrian Bundesliga	8	1	3	1	6 (Note: Appearances in UEFA Europa League)	0	—		17	2
Red Bull Salzburg	Total		53	10	11	2	18	2	3	0	85	13
Career total			72	16	12	2	18	2	3	0	105	20
