= Christian Zawieschitzky =

Austrian footballer (born 2007)

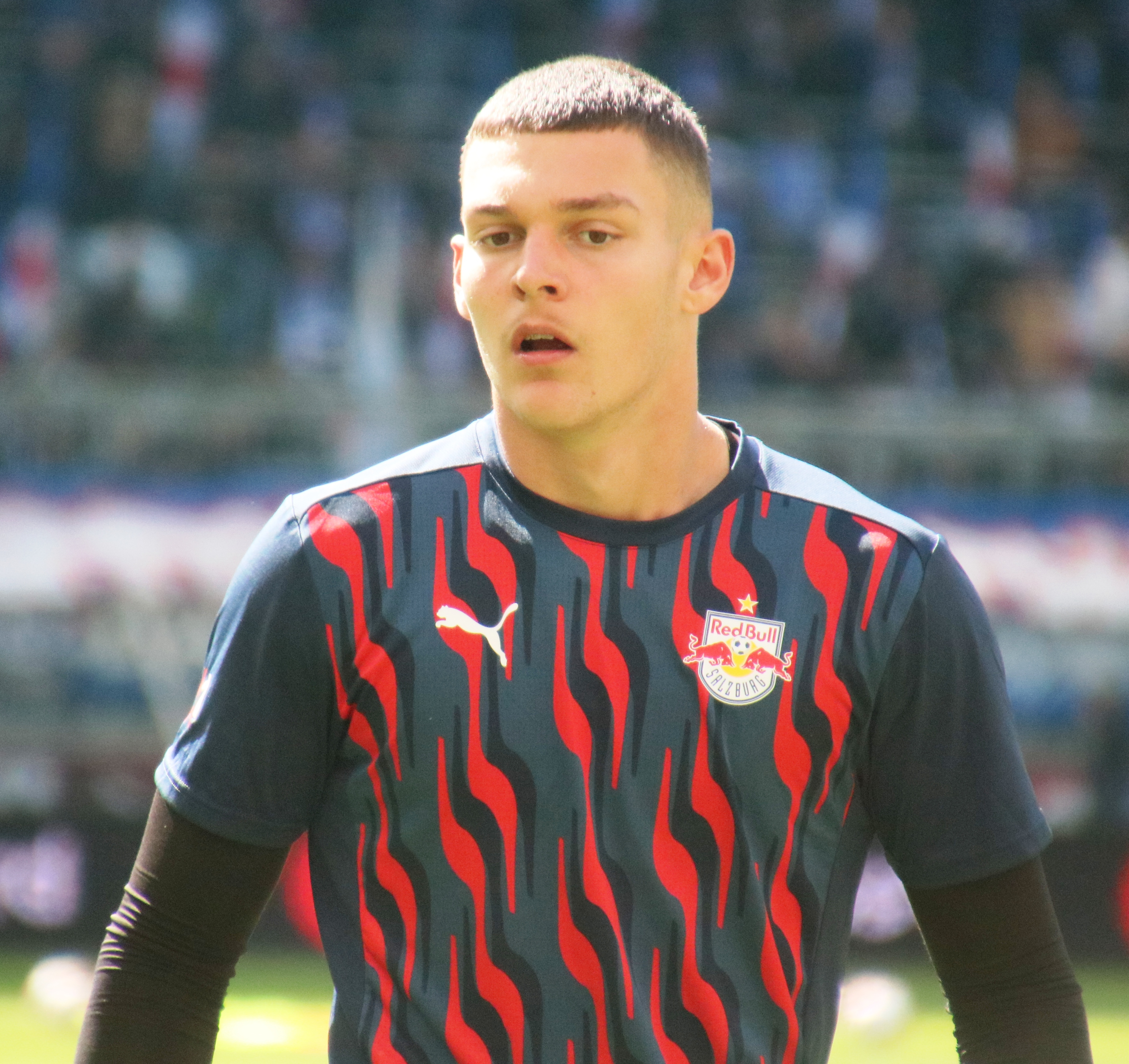
- Zawieschitzky in 2025

Personal information
- Date of birth: 2 May 2007 (age 19)
- Place of birth: Kufstein, Austria
- Height: 1.84 m (6 ft 0 in)
- Position: Goalkeeper

Team information
- Current team: Red Bull Salzburg
- Number: 52

Youth career
- 2013–2016: SC Kundl
- 2016–2020: FC Wacker Innsbruck
- 2020–2024: Red Bull Salzburg

Senior career*
Years	Team	Apps	(Gls)
2024–2026	FC Liefering	27	(0)
2025–	Red Bull Salzburg	10	(0)

International career^{‡}
2022	Austria U15	3	(0)
2022	Austria U16	1	(0)
2024–2025	Austria U18	3	(0)
2025–2026	Austria U19	6	(0)
2025–	Austria U21	1	(0)
2026–	Austria	1	(0)
- * Club domestic league appearances and goals as of 25 October 2026 ‡ National team caps and goals as of 27 September 2026

Christian Zawieschitzky (born 2 May 2007) is an Austrian professional footballer who plays as a goalkeeper for Austrian Bundesliga club Red Bull Salzburg and the Austria national team.

== Club career ==
Born in Kufstein, Zawieschitzky is a youth product of Red Bull Salzburg, which he joined in 2020 from FC Wacker Innsbruck.

In September 2024, he signed his first professional contract with Red Bull Salzburg, having started his professional career with FC Liefering in the 2. Liga.

Zawieschitzky signed a contract extension in February, having become a regular with FC Liefering, but also with Salzburg's youth team in the UEFA Youth League, where he helped his team reach the semi-final of the competition.

Zawieschitzky made his debut with Red Bull Salzburg during a Club World Cup game against Mexican Liga MX club Pachuca on 19 June 2025.

== International career ==
Zawieschitzky is a youth international for Austria, from the under-15 to the under-21.

In September 2026, he was one of the players who were called up to the Austria national team by head coach Ralf Rangnick, for the 2026–27 UEFA Nations League B matches against Israel, Kosovo (twice) and Republic of Ireland on 24, 27 September, 1 and 4 October 2026.

== Career statistics ==
=== Club ===
As of match played 25 October 2026

Appearances and goals by club, season and competition
Club	Season	League			Austrian Cup		Europe		Other		Total	
Club	Season	Division	Apps	Goals	Apps	Goals	Apps	Goals	Apps	Goals	Apps	Goals
Liefering	2024–25	2. Liga	14	0	—		—		—		14	0
Liefering	2025–26	2. Liga	13	0	—		—		—		13	0
Liefering	Total		27	0	—		—		—		27	0
Red Bull Salzburg	2024–25	Austrian Bundesliga	—		—		—		3 (Note: Appearances in FIFA Club World Cup)	0	3	0
Red Bull Salzburg	2025–26	Austrian Bundesliga	1	0	0	0	1 (Note: Appearance(s) in UEFA Europa League)	0	—		2	0
Red Bull Salzburg	2026–27	Austrian Bundesliga	9	0	1	0	7	0	—		17	0
Red Bull Salzburg	Total		10	0	1	0	8	0	3	0	22	0
Career total			37	0	1	0	8	0	3	0	49	0

=== International ===
As of match played 27 September 2026

Appearances and goals by national team and year
National team	Year	Apps	Goals
Austria	2026	1	0
Total		1	0
