= John Mellberg =

Swedish football player

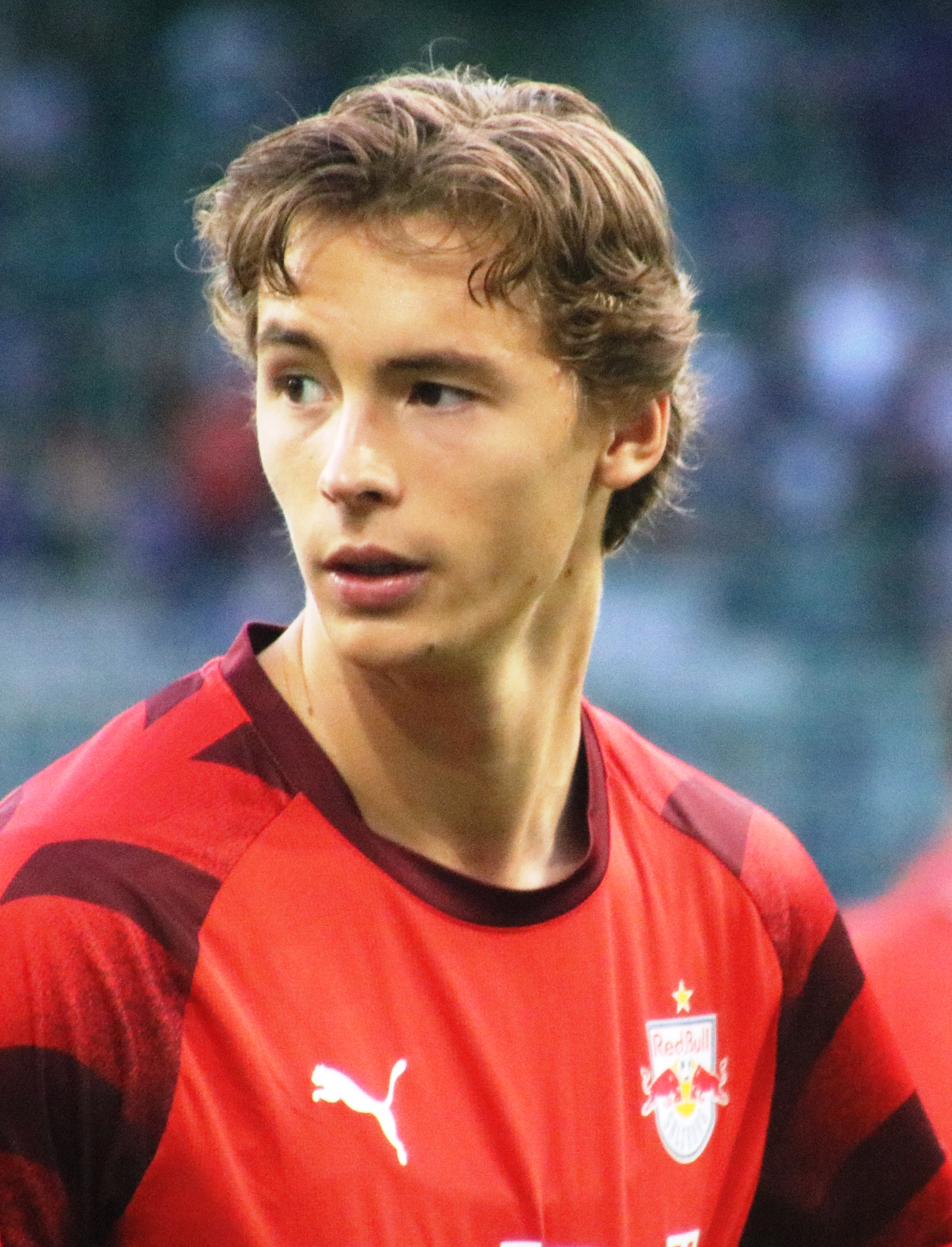
- Mellberg in 2026

Personal information
- Full name: John Olof Mellberg
- Date of birth: 30 July 2006 (age 20)
- Place of birth: Birmingham, England
- Height: 6 ft 3 in (1.91 m)
- Positions: Centre-back; left-back

Team information
- Current team: Red Bull Salzburg
- Number: 4

Youth career
- 2015–2023: IF Brommapojkarna

Senior career*
Years	Team	Apps	(Gls)
2023	IF Brommapojkarna	0	(0)
2023–	Red Bull Salzburg	6	(0)
2023–2025	→ FC Liefering (loan)	27	(0)

International career^{‡}
2022–2023	Sweden U17	8	(0)
2023–2024	Sweden U19	11	(1)
2025–	Sweden U21	2	(0)
- * Club domestic league appearances and goals as of 21:03, 30 August 2026 (UTC) ‡ National team caps and goals as of 17:58, 4 June 2026 (UTC)

John Olof Mellberg (born 30 July 2006) is a Swedish professional footballer who plays as defender for Austrian Bundesliga club Red Bull Salzburg. Born in England, he represents Sweden at youth level.

== Club career ==
Mellberg started playing football with the youth academy of IF Brommapojkarna at the age of 9, and was promoted to their senior team for the 2023 season. On 19 June 2023, he transferred to the Austrian Bundesliga club Red Bull Salzburg on a contract until 2026, and was initially assigned to their partner club FC Liefering. He made his senior and professional debut with Liefering in a 1–0 loss to Dornbirn on 28 July 2023.

== International career ==
Mellberg is a youth international for Sweden, having played for the Sweden U17s.

In June 2025 he was selected for the senior Sweden squad for friendly matches against Hungary and Algeria on 6 and 10 June 2025, respectively.

== Personal life ==
His father Olof Mellberg was also a professional footballer.

== Career statistics ==
As of match played 28 October 2026

Appearances and goals by club, season and competition
Club	Season	League			National cup (Note: Includes Austrian Cup)		Europe		Other		Total	
Club	Season	Division	Apps	Goals	Apps	Goals	Apps	Goals	Apps	Goals	Apps	Goals
IF Brommapojkarna	2023	Allsvenskan	0	0	0	0	—		—		0	0
Red Bull Salzburg	2023–24	Austrian Bundesliga	0	0	0	0	0	0	0	0	0	0
Red Bull Salzburg	2024–25	Austrian Bundesliga	5	0	0	0	1 (Note: Appearance in UEFA Champions League)	0	2 (Note: Appearances in FIFA Club World Cup)	0	8	0
Red Bull Salzburg	2025–26	Austrian Bundesliga	0	0	0	0	0	0	—		0	0
Red Bull Salzburg	2026–27	Austrian Bundesliga	1	0	2	0	1 (Note: Appearance in UEFA Europa League)	0	—		4	0
Red Bull Salzburg	Total		6	0	2	0	2	0	2	0	12	0
FC Liefering (loan)	2023–24	2. Liga	10	0	—		—		—		10	0
FC Liefering (loan)	2024–25	2. Liga	15	0	—		—		—		15	0
FC Liefering (loan)	2025–26	2. Liga	2	0	—		—		—		2	0
FC Liefering (loan)	Total		27	0	—		—		—		27	0
Career total			33	0	2	0	2	0	2	0	39	0
