= Hannes Winklbauer =

Austrian footballer and coach

Personal information
- Full name: Johann Winklbauer
- Date of birth: 25 December 1949 (age 76)
- Position: Defender

Senior career*
Years	Team	Apps	(Gls)
–1969	Kapfenberger SV		
1969–1971	Schwarz-Weiß Bregenz		
1971–1984	Austria Salzburg	303	(4)

International career
1974–1975	Austria	7	(0)

Managerial career
- 1984–1985: Austria Salzburg
- 1986–1987: Austria Salzburg
- * Club domestic league appearances and goals

Hannes Winklbauer (born 25 December 1949) is an Austrian retired footballer and coach.
