= Sōta Kitano =

Japanese footballer (born 2004)

Sōta Kitano 北野 颯太
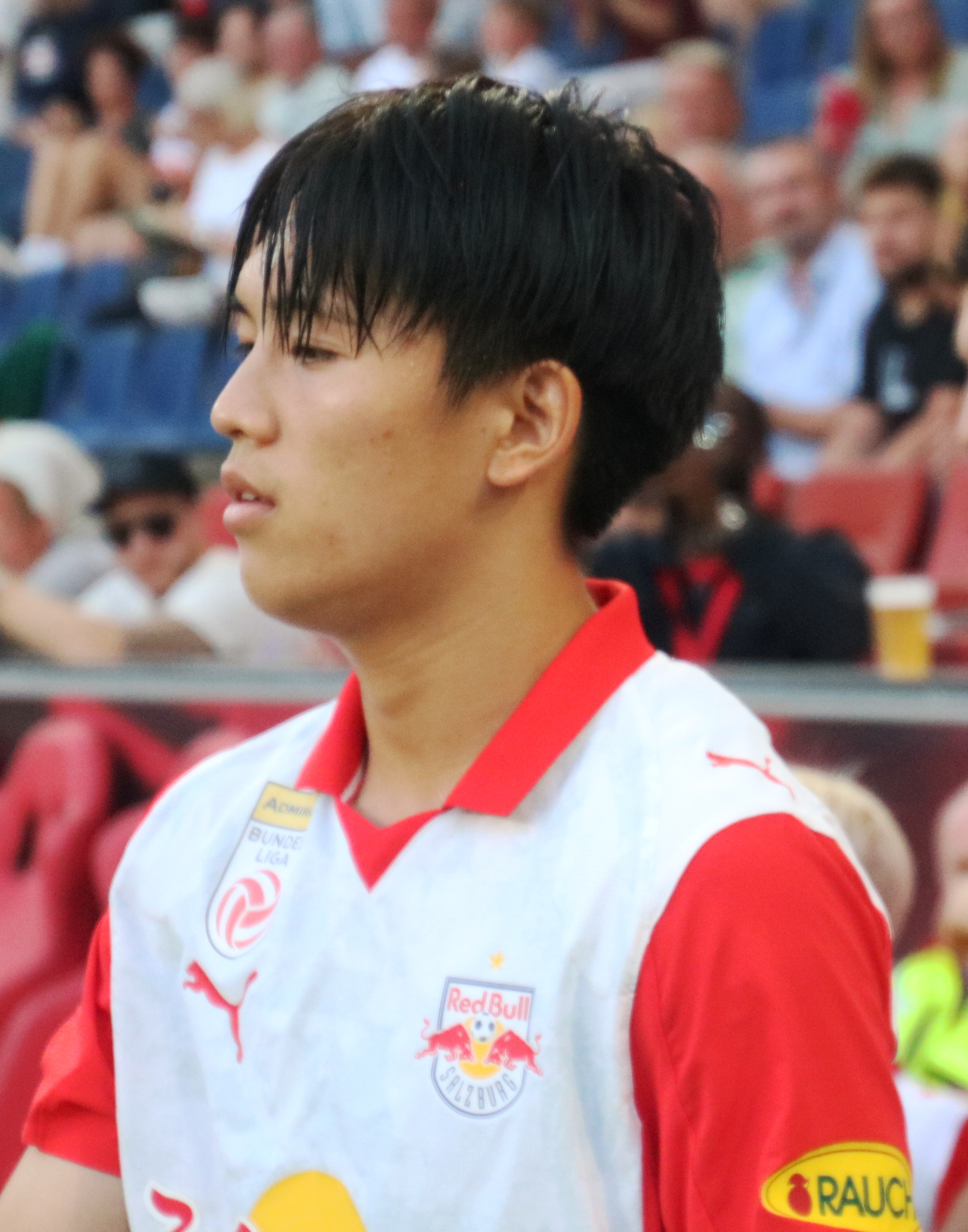
- Kitano with Red Bull Salzburg in 2025

Personal information
- Full name: Sōta Kitano
- Date of birth: 13 August 2004 (age 22)
- Place of birth: Wakayama, Japan
- Height: 1.72 m (5 ft 8 in)
- Position: Attacking midfielder

Team information
- Current team: Red Bull Salzburg
- Number: 8

Youth career
- 2010–2013: Alma Futsal Club
- 2014–2016: Arterivo Yuasa
- 2017–2022: Cerezo Osaka

Senior career*
Years	Team	Apps	(Gls)
2020	Cerezo Osaka U-23	8	(0)
2022–2025	Cerezo Osaka	68	(8)
2025–	Red Bull Salzburg	33	(7)

International career^{‡}
2019	Japan U15	2	(0)
2019	Japan U16	6	(2)
2022–2023	Japan U20	19	(6)
2025–	Japan	1	(0)
- * Club domestic league appearances and goals as of 19:13, 18 October 2026 (UTC) ‡ National team caps and goals as of 14 November 2025 (UTC)

Sōta Kitano (北野 颯太, Kitano Sōta; born 13 August 2004) is a Japanese professional footballer who plays as an attacking midfielder for Austrian Bundesliga club Red Bull Salzburg and the Japan national team.

== Club career ==
On 25 October 2020, Kitano made his league debut against Gamba Osaka U-23. In doing so, he became the youngest player to debut in an official match at 16 years, 2 months and 12 days, a record formerly held by forward Yoichiro Kakitani.

On 18 February 2022, Kitano was registered as a type 2 player for J League matches. On 25 February 2022, he signed a professional contract with the club. Kitano scored his first professional goal against Kashima Antlers on 2 March 2022, scoring in the 12th minute. At 17 years, 6 months and 17 days old, he became the club's youngest player to score in an official match, breaking Takumi Minamino's record of 18 years, 2 months and 7 days old when he scored his first professional goal. He won the 2022 New Hero Award. On 6 June 2023, Kitano scored his first J1 goal against Vissel Kobe on 10 June 2023, scoring in the 90th+3rd minute. In July 2024, he trialled for two weeks with Dutch Eredivisie club Almere City, which was a turning point for him.

On 9 June 2025, Kitano signed a five-year contract with Austrian Bundesliga club Red Bull Salzburg.

== International career ==
Kitano was called up to the Japan U20s on 7 February 2023 for the 2023 AFC U-20 Asian Cup.

Kitano was called up to the Japan U20s on 9 May 2023 for the 2023 FIFA U-20 World Cup.

== Career statistics ==
=== Club ===
As of match played 18 October 2026

Appearances and goals by club, season and competition
Club	Season	League			National cup (Note: Includes Emperor's Cup, Austrian Cup)		League cup (Note: Includes J.League Cup)		Continental		Other		Total	
Club	Season	Division	Apps	Goals	Apps	Goals	Apps	Goals	Apps	Goals	Apps	Goals	Apps	Goals
Cerezo Osaka U-23	2020	J3 League	8	0	—		—		—		—		8	0
Cerezo Osaka	2022	J1 League	19	0	0	0	10	3	—		—		29	3
Cerezo Osaka	2023	J1 League	12	2	3	2	4	0	—		—		19	4
Cerezo Osaka	2024	J1 League	18	2	1	0	3	0	—		—		22	2
Cerezo Osaka	2025	J1 League	19	4	0	0	2	0	—		—		21	4
Cerezo Osaka	Total		68	8	4	2	19	3	—		—		91	13
Red Bull Salzburg	2024–25	Austrian Bundesliga	—		—		—		—		1 (Note: Appearances in FIFA Club World Cup)	0	1	0
Red Bull Salzburg	2025–26	Austrian Bundesliga	25	6	4	0	—		9 (Note: Three appearances in UEFA Champions League, six appearances in UEFA Europa League)	0	—		38	6
Red Bull Salzburg	2026–27	Austrian Bundesliga	8	1	2	1	—		6 (Note: Appearances in UEFA Europa League)	0	—		16	2
Red Bull Salzburg	Total		33	7	6	1	—		15	0	1	0	55	8
Career total			109	14	10	3	19	3	15	0	1	0	154	21

=== International ===
As of match played 14 November 2025

Appearances and goals by national team and year
National team	Year	Apps	Goals
Japan	2025	1	0
Total		1	0

== Honours ==
Individual

- J1 League Young Player of the Month: February/March 2025,
