= Enrique Aguilar (footballer) =

Swiss footballer

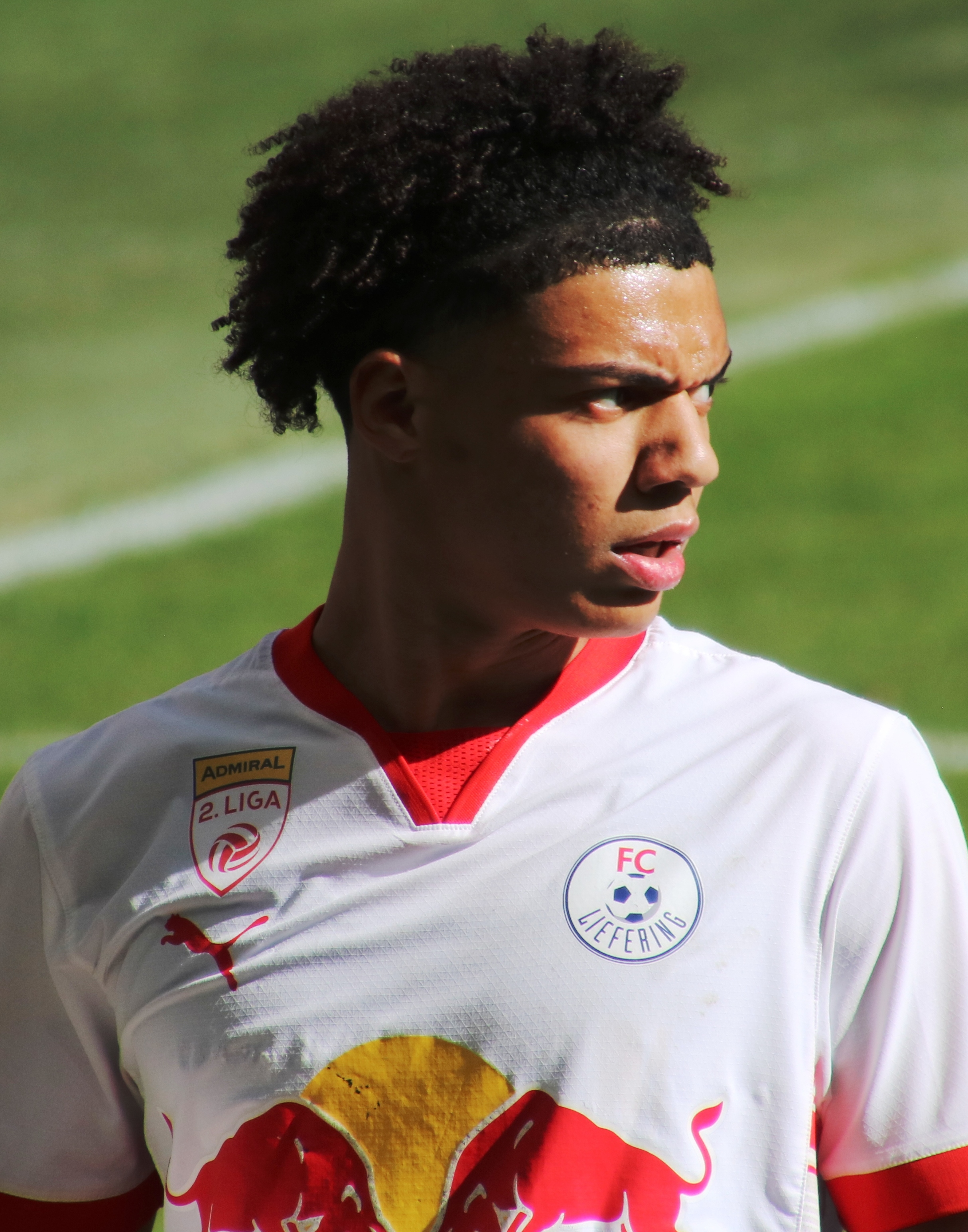
- Aguilar in 2025

Personal information
- Full name: Enrique Marlon Aguilar
- Date of birth: 27 January 2007 (age 19)
- Place of birth: Basel, Switzerland
- Height: 1.85 m (6 ft 1 in)
- Position: Forward

Team information
- Current team: Red Bull Salzburg
- Number: 43

Youth career
- 2016: Black Stars Basel
- 2016–2023: Basel
- 2023–2024: Red Bull Salzburg

Senior career*
Years	Team	Apps	(Gls)
2024–2026	FC Liefering	34	(7)
2025–	Red Bull Salzburg	9	(0)

International career^{‡}
2022–2023	Switzerland U16	6	(1)
2023	Switzerland U17	5	(1)
2024–2025	Switzerland U18	7	(1)
2025–	Switzerland U19	5	(1)
- * Club domestic league appearances and goals as of 22:30, 2 September 2026 (UTC) ‡ National team caps and goals as of 18:14, 10 December 2025 (UTC)

Enrique Marlon Aguilar (born 27 January 2007) is a Swiss professional footballer who plays as a forward for Austrian Bundesliga club Red Bull Salzburg.

== Club career ==
Aguilar is a product of the youth academies of the Swiss clubs Black Stars Basel and Basel, before moving to the academy of the Austrian club Red Bull Salzburg on 27 February 2023. On 9 August 2024 he was promoted to Red Bull Salzburg's farm team FC Liefering in the 2024–25 season in the 2. Liga. On 18 February 2025, he extended his contract with Red Bull Salzburg until 2027. In June 2025, he was named to Red Bull Salzburg's squad for the 2025 FIFA Club World Cup. On 26 July 2025, he debuted with the senior Red Bull Salzburg team in a 4–0 Austrian Cup win over Union Dietach.

== International career ==
Born in Switzerland, Aguilar has dual Swiss and Spanish citizenship. He is a youth international for Switzerland, having played for the Switzerland U19 for 2026 UEFA European Under-19 Championship qualification matches in November 2025.

== Personal life ==
Aguilar was born in Switzerland to a DR Congolese father and Spanish mother and holds Swiss and Spanish citizenship. He is of Panamanian descent through a grandfather.

== Career atatistics ==
As of match played 6 September 2026

Appearances and goals by club, season and competition
Club	Season	League			Austrian Cup		Europe		Other		Total	
Club	Season	Division	Apps	Goals	Apps	Goals	Apps	Goals	Apps	Goals	Apps	Goals
FC Liefering	2024–25	2. Liga	20	4	—		—		—		20	4
FC Liefering	2025–26	2. Liga	14	3	—		—		—		14	3
FC Liefering	Total		34	7	—		—		—		34	7
Red Bull Salzburg	2025–26	Austrian Bundesliga	7	0	2	0	2 (Note: Appearances in UEFA Europa League)	0	—		11	0
Red Bull Salzburg	2026–27	Austrian Bundesliga	2	0	1	0	1	0	—		4	0
Red Bull Salzburg	Total		9	0	3	0	3	0	—		15	0
Career total			43	7	3	0	3	0	0	0	49	7
