= Gaoussou Diakité =

Malian footballer (born 2004)

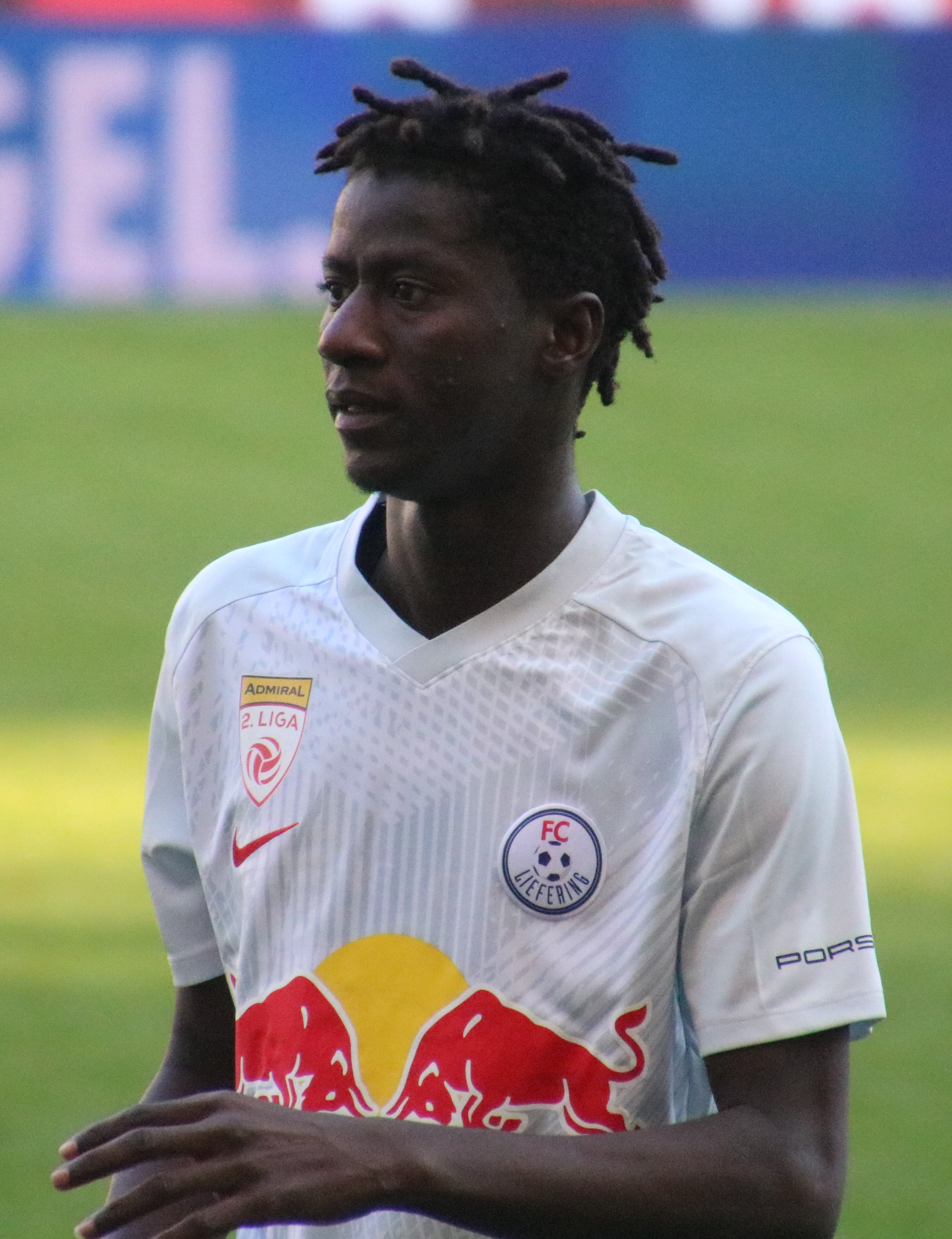
- Diakité with FC Liefering in 2024

Personal information
- Date of birth: 26 September 2005 (age 21)
- Place of birth: Mali
- Height: 1.82 m (6 ft 0 in)
- Position: Forward

Team information
- Current team: Red Bull Salzburg
- Number: 30

Youth career
- –2023: FC Guidars

Senior career*
Years	Team	Apps	(Gls)
2024–	Red Bull Salzburg	3	(0)
2024–2025	→ FC Liefering (loan)	34	(13)
2025–2026	→ Lausanne-Sport (loan)	31	(7)

International career^{‡}
2025–	Mali U23	4	(2)
2025–	Mali	5	(0)
- * Club domestic league appearances and goals as of 18 October 2026 ‡ National team caps and goals as of 12:03, 6 June 2026 (UTC)

Gaoussou Diakité (born 26 September 2005) is a Malian professional footballer who plays as a forward for Austrian Bundesliga club Red Bull Salzburg.

== Club career ==
Diakité was born on 26 September 2005 in Mali. As a youth player, he joined the youth academy of Malian side FC Guidars. He was teammates with Malian footballer Soumaïla Diabaté, who he later reunited with after signing for Austrian side Red Bull Salzburg.

On 25 January 2024, he signed for Austrian side Red Bull Salzburg. After that, he was sent on loan to Austrian side FC Liefering. On 2 March 2024, Diakité debuted for the club during a 3–1 win over SKN St. Pölten. On 31 March 2024, he scored his first goal for the club during a 4–1 win over Floridsdorfer AC.

Diakité joined Lausanne-Sport on loan on 4 July 2025.

== International career ==
On 11 December 2025, Diakité was called up to the Mali squad for the 2025 Africa Cup of Nations.

== Career statistics ==
=== Club ===
As of match played 28 October 2026

Appearances and goals by club, season and competition
Club	Season	League			National cup (Note: Includes Swiss Cup)		Europe		Other		Total	
Club	Season	Division	Apps	Goals	Apps	Goals	Apps	Goals	Apps	Goals	Apps	Goals
Red Bull Salzburg	2023–24	Austrian Bundesliga	0	0	0	0	0	0	—		0	0
Red Bull Salzburg	2026–27	Austrian Bundesliga	3	0	2	1	3 (Note: Appearances in UEFA EUropa League)	0	—		8	1
Red Bull Salzburg	Total		3	0	2	1	3	0	—		8	1
Liefering (loan)	2023–24	2. Liga	11	4	0	0	—		—		11	4
Liefering (loan)	2024–25	2. Liga	23	9	0	0	—		—		23	9
Liefering (loan)	Total		34	13	0	0	—		—		34	13
Lausanne-Sport (loan)	2025–26	Swiss Super League	31	7	2	1	13 (Note: Appearances in UEFA Conference League)	4	—		46	12
Career total			68	20	4	2	16	4	0	0	88	26

=== International ===
As of match played 4 June 2026

Appearances and goals by national team and year
National team	Year	Apps	Goals
Mali	2025	1	0
Mali	2026	4	0
Total		5	0
