= Frans Krätzig =

German footballer (born 2003)

- Krätzig with Red Bull Salzburg in 2025

Personal information
- Full name: Frans Lares Krätzig
- Date of birth: 14 January 2003 (age 23)
- Place of birth: Nuremberg, Germany
- Height: 1.77 m (5 ft 10 in)
- Positions: Left-back; midfielder

Team information
- Current team: Red Bull Salzburg
- Number: 13

Youth career
- –2012: Post SV Nürnberg
- 2012–2017: 1. FC Nürnberg
- 2017–2022: Bayern Munich

Senior career*
| Years | Team | Apps | (Gls) |
| 2022–2024 | Bayern Munich II | 35 | (3) |
| 2023–2025 | Bayern Munich | 4 | (0) |
| 2024 | → Austria Wien (loan) | 14 | (1) |
| 2024 | → VfB Stuttgart (loan) | 1 | (0) |
| 2024 | → VfB Stuttgart II (loan) | 2 | (0) |
| 2025 | → 1. FC Heidenheim (loan) | 16 | (1) |
| 2025– | Red Bull Salzburg | 29 | (1) |

International career^{‡}
| 2023–2024 | Germany U20 | 8 | (1) |
| 2024 | Germany U21 | 3 | (0) |
- * Club domestic league appearances and goals as of 19:00, 10 October 2026 (UTC) ‡ National team caps and goals as of 18:24, 19 November 2024 (UTC)

Frans Lares Krätzig (born 14 January 2003) is a German professional footballer who plays as a left-back or midfielder for Austrian Bundesliga club Red Bull Salzburg.

== Club career ==
=== Early career ===
Krätzig was born in Nuremberg, in the Franconia region of Germany. He started playing at Post SV Nürnberg before joining 1. FC Nürnberg in 2012, followed by the youth set-up of Bayern Munich in 2017. Due to the distance from his home, he attended boarding school and was one of the first talents on the FC Bayern Campus that opened in summer of 2017.

Whilst playing for the under-19 team, Krätzig signed a professional contract with Bayern Munich in February 2021. In September 2021, he sustained a persistent pubic bone injury which sidelined him until April 2022. Formerly an attacking midfielder, Krätzig was converted to a left-sided full-back at Bayern Munich II, under Holger Seitz.

=== Bayern Munich ===
In March 2023, Krätzig signed a two-year contract extension with Bayern Munich. He was selected to join with the first-team squad on a pre-season tour of Singapore in the summer of 2023, and played against Manchester City in July 2023. Krätzig scored a spectacular long range goal in the last minute to allow Bayern Munich to earn a 4–3 win over Liverpool on 2 August 2023 in the Audi Football Summit and win the Singapore Trophy. He was then called up on the bench for the 2023 DFL-Supercup match against RB Leipzig that ended 3–0 as a defeat, on 12 August 2023.

On 23 September 2023, Krätzig made his Bundesliga debut, coming off the bench in the 65th minute replacing Alphonso Davies, in a 7–0 home victory against VfL Bochum. Three days later, he made his second official appearance for Bayern Munich, coming off the bench at the 11th minute and contributed to a 4–0 away victory, scoring the second goal and his first professional official goal for the senior team at a match in the first round of the DFB Pokal against 3. Liga club SC Preußen Münster. On 6 October 2023, he extended his professional contract with the club until 2027. On 29 November, he made his Champions League debut, coming off the bench in the 86th minute, in a goalless draw against Copenhagen.

==== Loan to Austria Wien ====
On 6 February 2024, Krätzig joined Austrian Bundesliga side Austria Wien on a six-month loan, until the end of the season. Later that month, on 17 February, he scored his first goal in a 2–1 victory over Rheindorf Altach.

==== Loan to VfB Stuttgart ====
On 28 June 2024, Krätzig signed a one-year loan contract with fellow Bundesliga club VfB Stuttgart, with the option to make the move permanent at the end of the season. On 2 January 2025, it was announced that Krätzig's loan to VfB Stuttgart would be terminated and he would return to his parent club Bayern Munich.

==== Loan to 1. FC Heidenhein ====
On 3 January 2025, one day after his loan spell with VfB Stuttgart was cut short after just six months, he immediately moved to fellow Bundesliga club 1. FC Heidenheim on a six-month loan, until the end of the 2024–25 season, with Krätzig also joining former teammate Paul Wanner. He made a goalscoring debut, scoring in their 2–0 victory over Union Berlin on 11 January 2025.

=== Red Bull Salzburg ===
On 28 May 2025, Krätzig moved back to Austria and joined Red Bull Salzburg permanently, for an estimated €3.5 million transfer fee, choosing the number 13 shirt and signing a contract until June 2028.

== International career ==
In September 2023, Krätzig played his first international matches for Germany U20 during the 2023–24 Under 20 Elite League against Italy and Poland, in which both matches ended in a 1–1 draw.

== Career statistics ==
As of match played 25 October 2026

Appearances and goals by club, season and competition
| Club | Season | League | | | National cup (Note: Includes DFB-Pokal, Austrian Cup) | | Europe | | Other | | Total | |
| Club | Season | Division | Apps | Goals | Apps | Goals | Apps | Goals | Apps | Goals | Apps | Goals |
|---|---|---|---|---|---|---|---|---|---|---|---|---|
| Bayern Munich II | 2022–23 | Regionalliga Bayern | 32 | 2 | — | | — | | — | | 32 | 2 |
| Bayern Munich II | 2023–24 | Regionalliga Bayern | 3 | 1 | — | | — | | — | | 3 | 1 |
| Bayern Munich II | Total | | 35 | 3 | — | | — | | — | | 35 | 3 |
| Bayern Munich | 2023–24 | Bundesliga | 4 | 0 | 2 | 1 | 1 (Note: Appearance(s) in UEFA Champions League) | 0 | 0 | 0 | 7 | 1 |
| Austria Wien (loan) | 2023–24 | Austrian Bundesliga | 14 | 1 | 0 | 0 | 0 | 0 | 3 (Note: Apeearances in Austrian Bundesliga European play-offs) | 0 | 17 | 1 |
| VfB Stuttgart (loan) | 2024–25 | Bundesliga | 1 | 0 | 2 | 0 | 0 | 0 | 1 (Note: Appearance in DFL-Supercup) | 0 | 4 | 0 |
| VfB Stuttgart II (loan) | 2024–25 | 3. Liga | 2 | 0 | — | | — | | — | | 2 | 0 |
| 1. FC Heidenheim (loan) | 2024–25 | Bundesliga | 16 | 1 | — | | 0 | 0 | 2 (Note: Appearances in Bundesliga relegation play-offs) | 0 | 18 | 1 |
| Red Bull Salzburg | 2024–25 | Austrian Bundesliga | — | | — | | — | | 3 (Note: Appearances in FIFA Club World Cup) | 0 | 3 | 0 |
| Red Bull Salzburg | 2025–26 | Austrian Bundesliga | 24 | 0 | 3 | 0 | 7 (Note: Three appearances in UEFA Champions League, four appearances and one goal in UEFA Europa League) | 1 | — | | 34 | 1 |
| Red Bull Salzburg | 2026–27 | Austrian Bundesliga | 5 | 1 | 3 | 0 | 3 (Note: Appearances in UEFA Europa League) | 0 | — | | 11 | 1 |
| Red Bull Salzburg | Total | | 29 | 1 | 6 | 0 | 10 | 1 | 3 | 0 | 48 | 2 |
| Career total | | | 101 | 6 | 10 | 1 | 11 | 1 | 9 | 0 | 131 | 8 |
