= Bartosz Mazurek =

Polish footballer (born 2007)

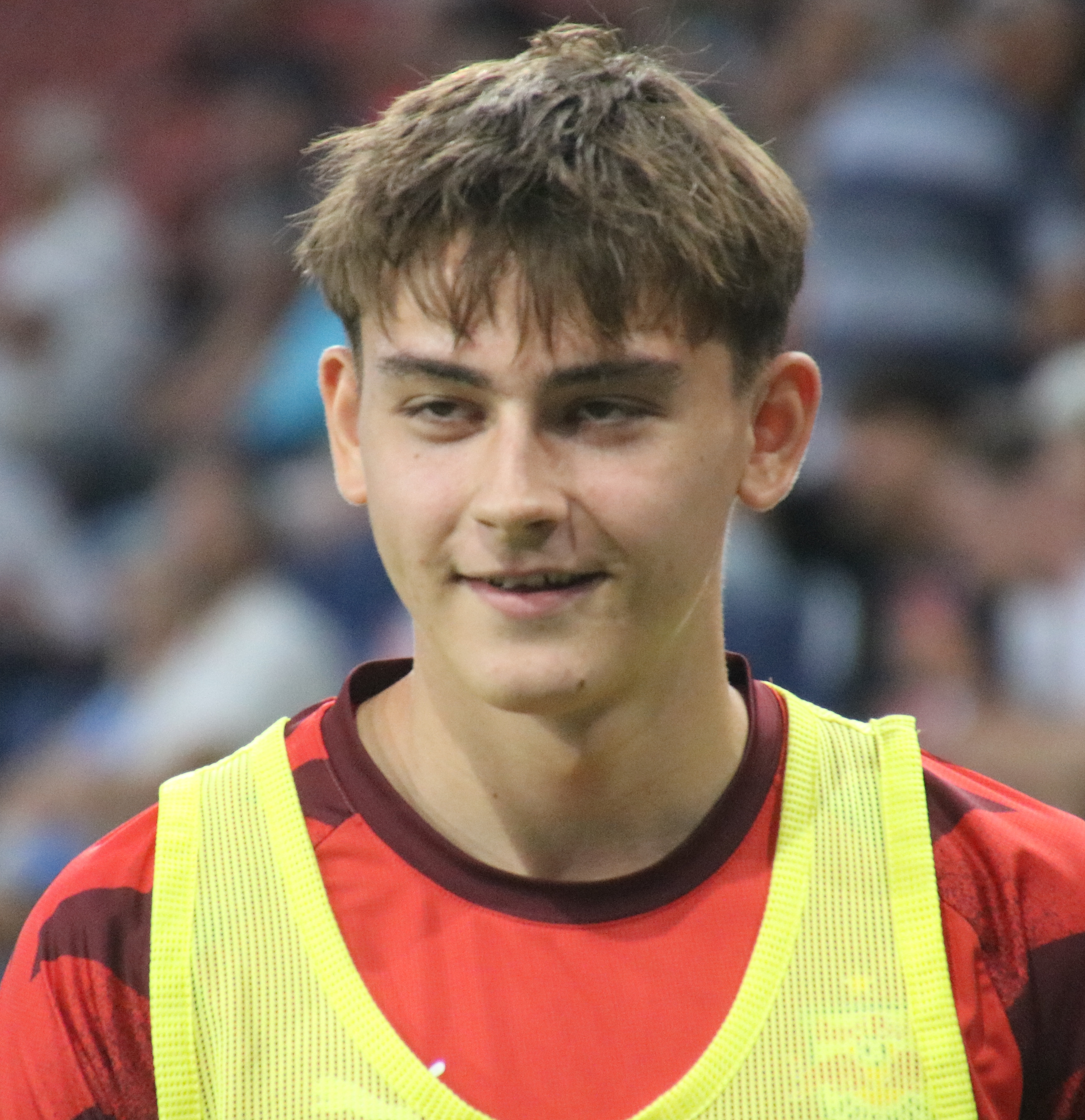
- Mazurek in 2026 with FC Red Bull Salzburg

Personal information
- Date of birth: 3 January 2007 (age 19)
- Place of birth: Grajewo, Poland
- Height: 1.80 m (5 ft 11 in)
- Position: Midfielder

Team information
- Current team: Red Bull Salzburg
- Number: 15

Youth career
- –2019: Warmia Grajewo
- 2019–2024: Jagiellonia Białystok

Senior career*
Years	Team	Apps	(Gls)
2024–2025	Jagiellonia Białystok II	15	(6)
2025–2026	Jagiellonia Białystok	25	(1)
2026–	Red Bull Salzburg	12	(1)

International career^{‡}
2023	Poland U16	3	(1)
2023–2024	Poland U17	8	(0)
2024–2025	Poland U18	5	(1)
2025–2026	Poland U19	11	(2)
2026–	Poland U21	2	(2)
2026–	Poland	1	(0)
- * Club domestic league appearances and goals as of 11:09, 10 November 2026 (UTC) ‡ National team caps and goals as of 00:05, 14 November 2026(UTC)

Bartosz Mazurek (born 3 January 2007) is a Polish professional footballer who plays as a midfielder for Austrian Bundesliga club Red Bull Salzburg and the Poland national team.

== Club career ==
=== Jagiellonia Białystok ===
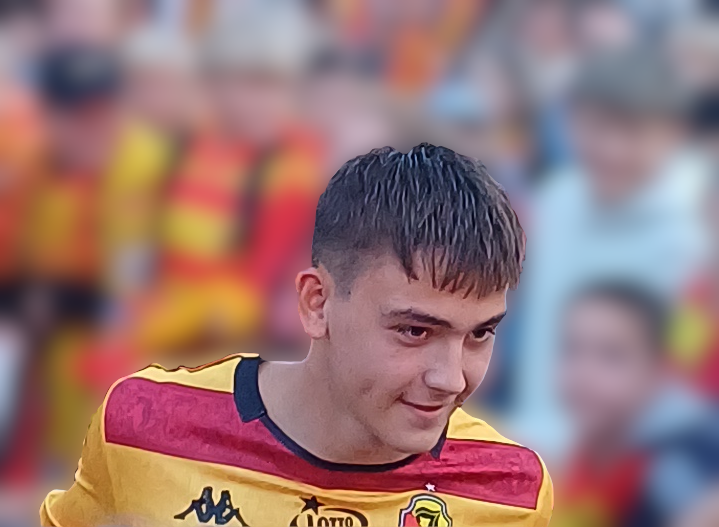
Mazurek with Jagiellonia Białystok in 2025 during presentation

Born in Grajewo, Mazurek began playing as a youth for Warmia Grajewo. Aged 12 and playing with boys older than him, he was signed by Jagiellonia Białystok after impressing in a match against them.

In January 2026, Jagiellonia sold 17-year-old Oskar Pietuszewski to Porto for €10 million, opening a space for Mazurek. On 31 January, Mazurek scored his first goal in a 3–1 win away to Widzew Łódź. On 26 February, he scored a hat-trick in a 4–2 extra-time win away to Fiorentina in the UEFA Conference League knockout phase playoffs; the Italian club won 5–4 on aggregate. Italian national sports newspaper La Gazzetta dello Sport rated his performance 8 out of 10 and compared him to Cristiano Ronaldo. He was the 10th player and first Pole to score three goals in a Conference League match, and at 19 years and 1 month he surpassed 22-year-old Marek Filipczak as the youngest Pole to score three goals in a European match.

=== Red Bull Salzburg ===
On 1 July 2026, Austrian club Red Bull Salzburg announced the signing of Mazurek on a five-year contract, for an undisclosed fee. The fee was reported in Poland as being around €7 million, with millions more dependent on performances, and Jagiellonia Białystok retaining a significant share in his next transfer. He made his debut on 25 July in the first round of the Austrian Cup, a 7–1 win away to third-tier SV Oberwart, as a 62nd-minute substitute. On 30 August, on his fourth Austrian Football Bundesliga appearance and ninth overall, he scored his first goal, in a 4–1 home win over Austria Wien.

== International career ==
Mazurek is a youth international for Poland. He was first called up to the Poland under-21 team for a set of 2027 UEFA Euro qualifying matches against Sweden and Italy in September and October 2026. On his debut against the former on 30 September, Mazurek scored twice in a 3–0 win.

In November 2026, he was named by head coach Jan Urban in the Poland senior squad to face Romania and Sweden in the UEFA Nations League. He made his debut as a substitute in a 2–1 loss against the former on 14 November.

== Career statistics ==
As of match played 8 November 2026

Appearances and goals by club, season and competition
Club	Season	League			National cup (Note: Includes Polish Cup, Austrian Cup)		Europe		Other		Total	
Club	Season	Division	Apps	Goals	Apps	Goals	Apps	Goals	Apps	Goals	Apps	Goals
Jagiellonia Białystok II	2024–25	III liga	12	5	—		—		—		12	5
Jagiellonia Białystok II	2025–26	III liga	3	1	—		—		—		3	1
Jagiellonia Białystok II	Total		15	6	—		—		—		15	6
Jagiellonia Białystok	2024–25	Ekstraklasa	2	0	0	0	0	0	0	0	2	0
Jagiellonia Białystok	2025–26	Ekstraklasa	23	1	1	0	9 (Note: Appearances in UEFA Conference League)	3	—		33	4
Jagiellonia Białystok	Total		25	1	1	0	9	3	0	0	35	4
Red Bull Salzburg	2026–27	Austrian Bundesliga	12	1	3	1	8 (Note: Appearances in UEFA Europa League)	0	—		23	2
Career total			52	8	4	1	17	3	0	0	73	12

=== International ===
As of match played 14 November 2026

Appearances and goals by national team and year
National team	Year	Apps	Goals
Poland	2026	1	0
Total		1	0
