= Raphael Duarte =

Luxembourgish football manager (born 1996)

Personal information
- Date of birth: 3 June 1996 (age 30)
- Place of birth: Luxembourg

Team information
- Current team: Red Bull Salzburg (assistant)

Managerial career
- Years: Team
- 2018–2021: Jeunesse Canach

Raphael Duarte (born 3 June 1996) is a Luxembourgish professional football manager who is the assistant manager of Austrian Bundesliga club Red Bull Salzburg.

== Early life ==
Duarte was born on 3 June 1996 in Luxembourg and attended the University of Luxembourg in Luxembourg. Of Portuguese descent through his parents, he can speak English, Luxembourgish, German, French, and Portuguese.

== Career ==
Duarte started his managerial career as a youth manager of Luxembourgish side Jeunesse Canach, before being promoted to first team assistant manager in 2016. In 2018, he was appointed as an analyst for Luxembourgish side Hostert. The same year, he returned as manager to Luxembourgish side Jeunesse Canach. During his first season with the club, he helped the club avoid relegation from the second tier to the third tier. Subsequently, he was appointed as an assistant manager of French side Nancy in 2021. Six months later, he was appointed as an assistant manager of German side SV Elversberg.
