= FC Red Bull Salzburg =

Association football club in Austria

Red Bull Salzburg
- Full name: Fußballclub Red Bull Salzburg
- Nickname: Die Roten Bullen (The Red Bulls)
- Founded: 13 September 1933; 93 years ago (as SV Austria Salzburg)
- Stadium: Red Bull Arena
- Capacity: 30,188
- Board member: Harald Lürzer (Chairman); Franz Rauch; Herbert Resch
- Head coach: Danny Röhl
- League: Austrian Bundesliga
- 2025–26: Austrian Bundesliga, 3rd of 12
- Website: redbullsalzburg.at
Home colours	Away colours

Fußballclub Red Bull Salzburg, commonly known as simply Red Bull Salzburg, is an Austrian professional football club based in Wals-Siezenheim, that competes in the Austrian Bundesliga, the top flight of Austrian Football. Their home ground is the Red Bull Arena. Due to sponsorship restrictions, the club is known as FC Salzburg and wears a modified crest when playing in FIFA and UEFA competitions.

The club was originally known as SV Austria Salzburg and played under various sponsored names, including SV Casino Salzburg and SV Wüstenrot Salzburg. In 2005, it was acquired by Red Bull GmbH, which rebranded the club and changed its traditional violet and white colours to red and white. This transformation led some supporters to establish a new club, SV Austria Salzburg, in response.

Founded in 1933, the club won its first Bundesliga title in 1994, which was the first of three in the span of four seasons which also saw them reach the 1994 UEFA Cup final. The club has won seventeen league titles and nine Austrian Cups, all nine of which came as doubles, as well as three Austrian Supercups. Salzburg has dominated Austrian football over the recent past, winning 14 league titles in 17 seasons including 10 in a row from 2014 to 2023.

== History ==
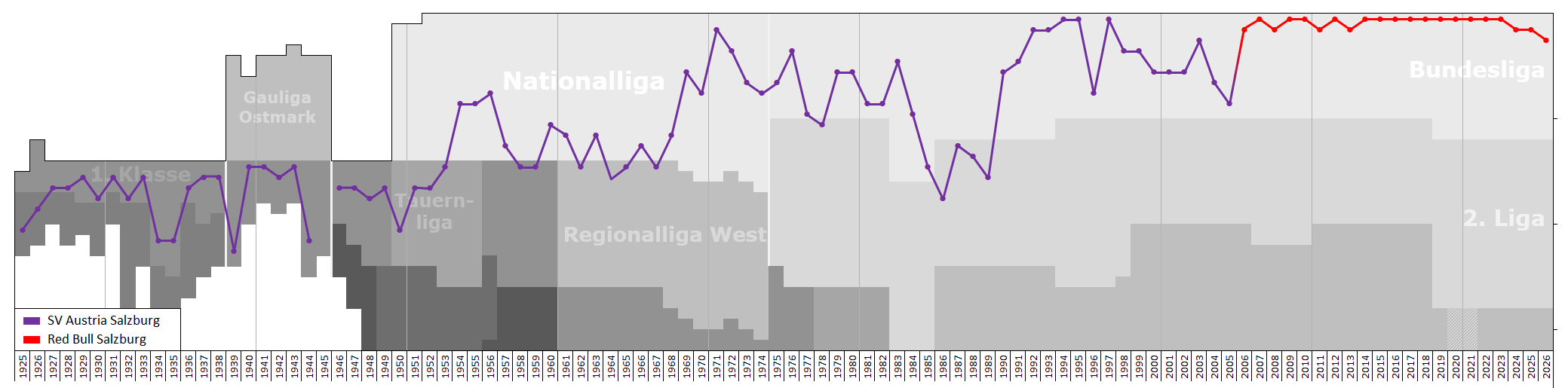
Historical chart of league performance of Red Bull Salzburg and their predecessor

=== 1933–1953, founding, promotion to A-league ===
FC RB Salzburg was founded on 13 September 1933 as SV Austria Salzburg, after the merger of the city's two clubs, Hertha and Rapid. In 1950, the club was dissolved but re-founded later the same year. It reached the Austrian top flight in 1953, and finished 9th of 14 clubs in its first season there, avoiding relegation by five points.

=== 1953–1970 ===
Vienna-born Erich Probst was Salzburg's first-ever international, earning the last of his 19 Austrian caps on 27 March 1960. Adolf Macek, who made the first of his four international appearances on 9 October 1965, was the club's first local player to earn a cap for Austria.

=== 1970–1990 ===
Salzburg were top-flight runners-up for the first time in the 1970–71 season, gaining 43 points to Wacker Innsbruck's 44. The club's first-ever European campaign was in the 1971–72 UEFA Cup, and it was eliminated 5–4 on aggregate by Romanian club UTA Arad despite a 3–1 home victory in the second leg. In 1974, Salzburg reached the Austrian Cup final for the first time, losing 2–1 away to Austria Wien in the first leg before a 1–1 home draw in the second.

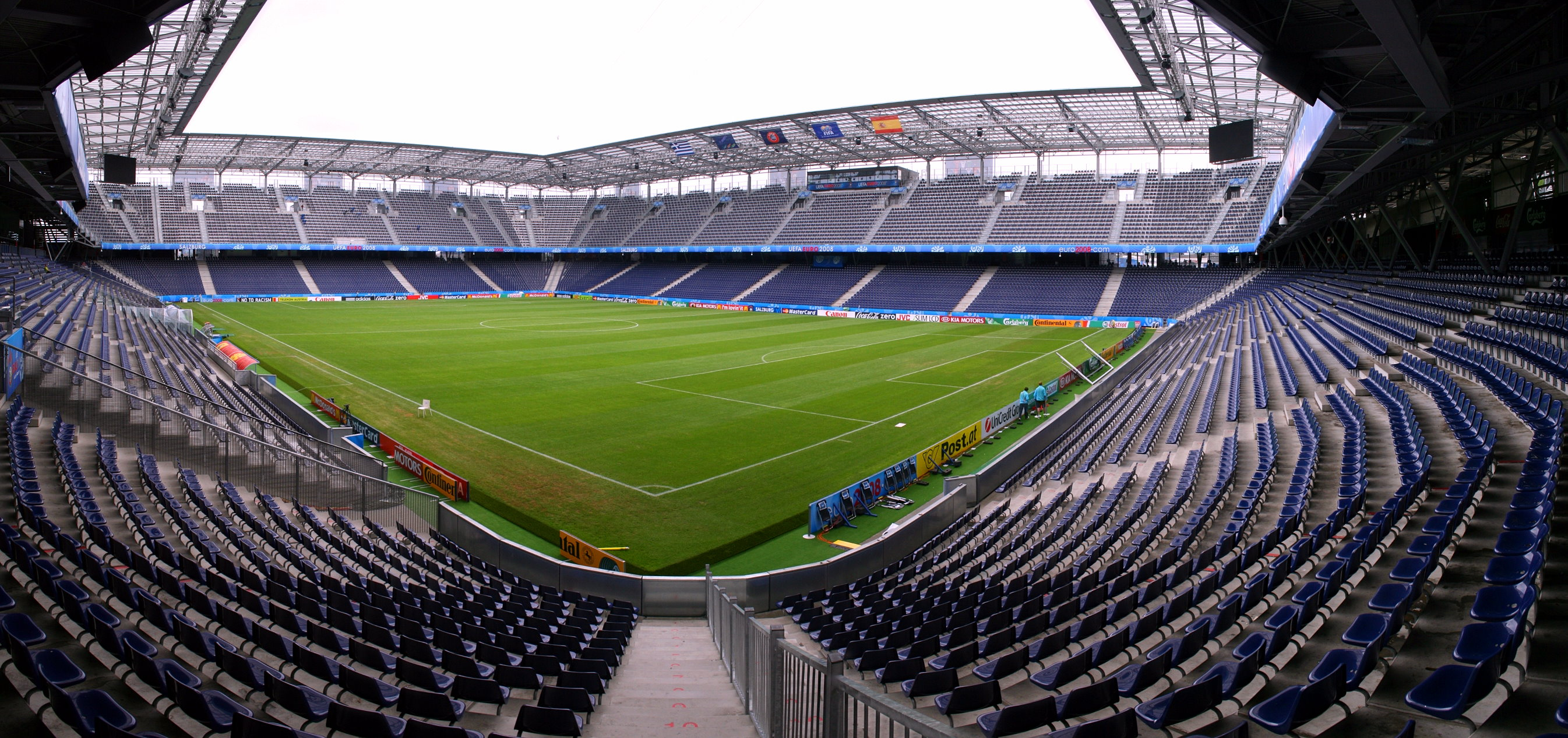
Salzburg moved to their current stadium, now known as the Red Bull Arena, in 2003.

In 1978, the club's name was changed to SV Casino Salzburg and in 1997, to SV Wüstenrot Salzburg, due to a sponsorship deal with an Austrian financial services corporation. The team often remained referred to as SV Austria Salzburg.

=== 1990–2010 ===
Salzburg reached their first and so far only European final, the 1994 UEFA Cup final, where they lost both legs 1–0 to Inter Milan. That same season, Salzburg won their first Bundesliga title, beating Austria Wien by 51 points to 49. The title was retained the following season as Salzburg beat Sturm Graz on goal difference. The 1995–96 season saw a drop to eighth place, one above a relegation play-off, but the club's third title in four seasons was won in 1997 as they beat holders Rapid Wien by three points.

Salzburg's inaugural UEFA Champions League campaign in 1994–95 saw them reach the group stage by beating Israel's Maccabi Haifa 5–2 on aggregate. They were drawn into Group D with holders and eventual finalists Milan and eventual winners Ajax, as well as AEK Athens. Despite drawing both matches with Ajax, Salzburg picked up a solitary 3–1 win away in Athens and were eliminated in third place.

The club moved to its current stadium, the Red Bull Arena in 2003.

==== The Red Bull takeover ====
The Red Bull company headed by Dietrich Mateschitz purchased the Salzburg Sport AG on 6 April 2005. The club's bylaws were amended so that the Red Bull Salzburg GmbH has the sole right to appoint and recall board members of the club. After the takeover, Mateschitz changed the club's name, management, and staff, declaring "this is a new club with no history". The club's website initially claimed that it was founded in 2005, but was ordered to remove this claim by the Austrian Football Association. The new authority removed all trace of violet from the club logo and the team now play in the colours of red and white, to the consternation of much of the club's traditional support. A small pair of wings form the motif of the new club crest, displayed on the team jersey, in accordance with Red Bull's commercial slogan at the time: "gives you wings". This complete re-branding of the team proved very similar to Red Bull's treatment of its two Formula One racing teams, Red Bull Racing and Scuderia Toro Rosso, now rebranded as RB Formula One Team. Red Bull, however, would not completely follow this precedent when it acquired the MetroStars club in Major League Soccer (MLS) in the United States; while it rebranded the team as the New York Red Bulls, it chose to recognise the MetroStars' history.

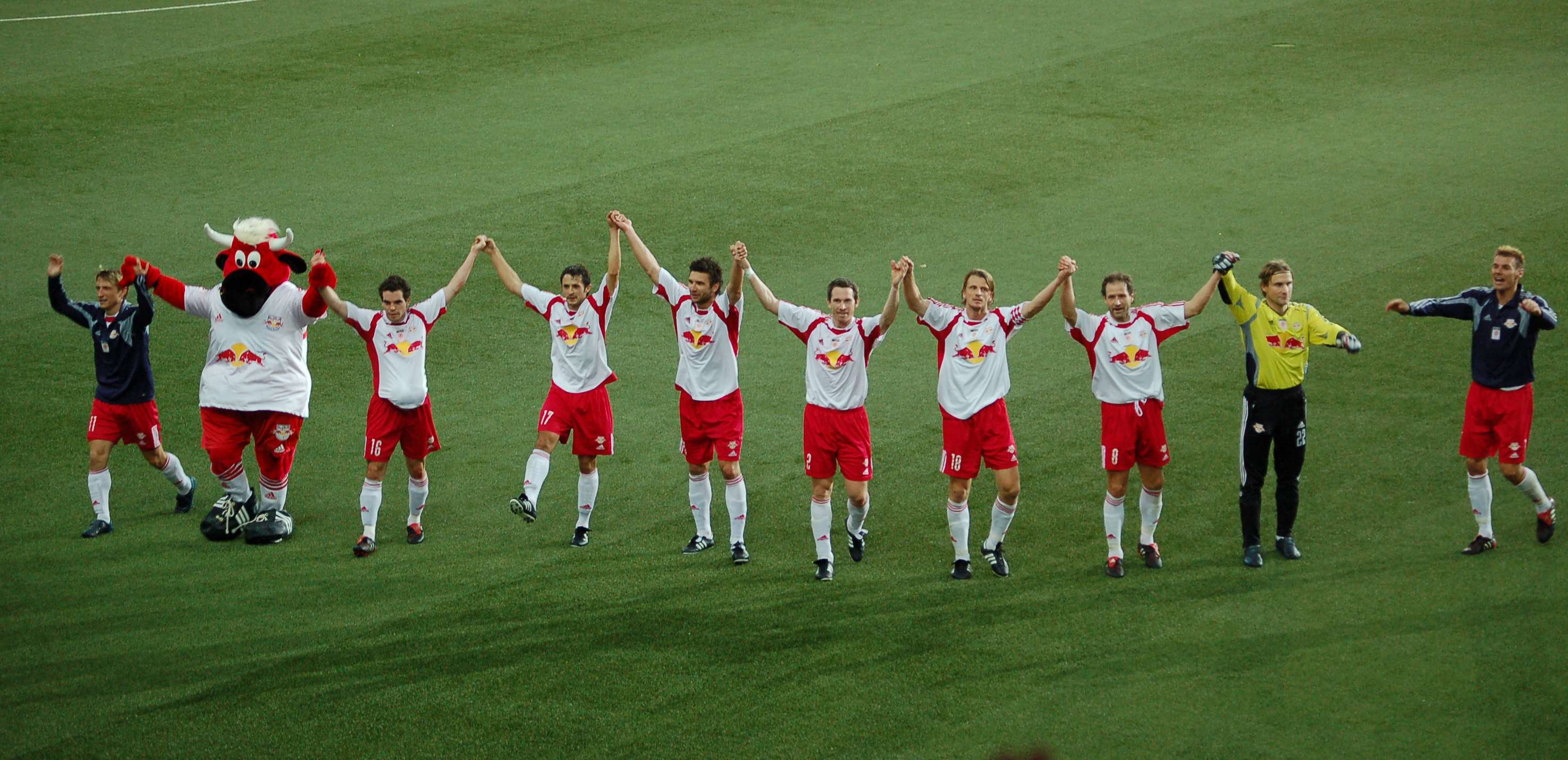
Red Bull Salzburg, October 2005

Traditional supporters sought to resist the radical changes by forming their own movement in an effort to preserve aspects of the club’s heritage. Several fan clubs across Europe expressed support, viewing the dispute as part of a broader struggle against the increasing commercialisation of football.

However, after five months of protests and negotiations between club owners and traditional fans, no compromise was reached. On 15 September 2005, the “violet” supporters announced that talks had irreversibly broken down and that efforts to reach an agreement would be discontinued.

This gave rise to two separate fan groups: the "Red-Whites", who support "Red Bull Salzburg" and the "Violet-Whites", who want to preserve the 72-year-old tradition and refuse to support the rebranded club. The Violet-Whites ultimately formed a new club, Austria Salzburg after viewing Red Bull's offer to maintain the original colours only for the goalkeeper's socks at away games as an insult.

The club's history going back to 1933 was later restored on the club website.

==== Red Bull era ====
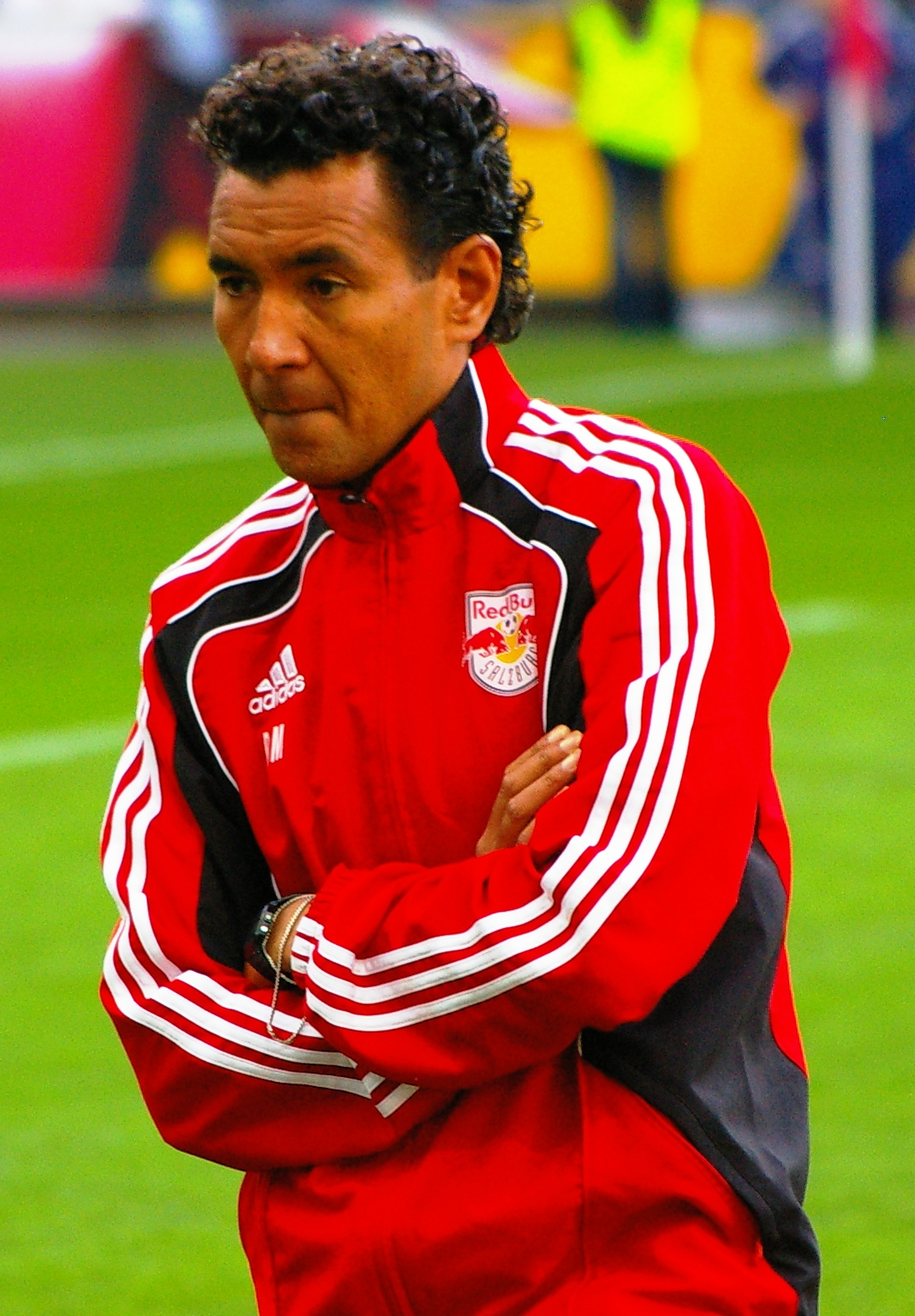
Dutchman Ricardo Moniz coached Red Bull to a Bundesliga and cup double in the 2011–12 season.

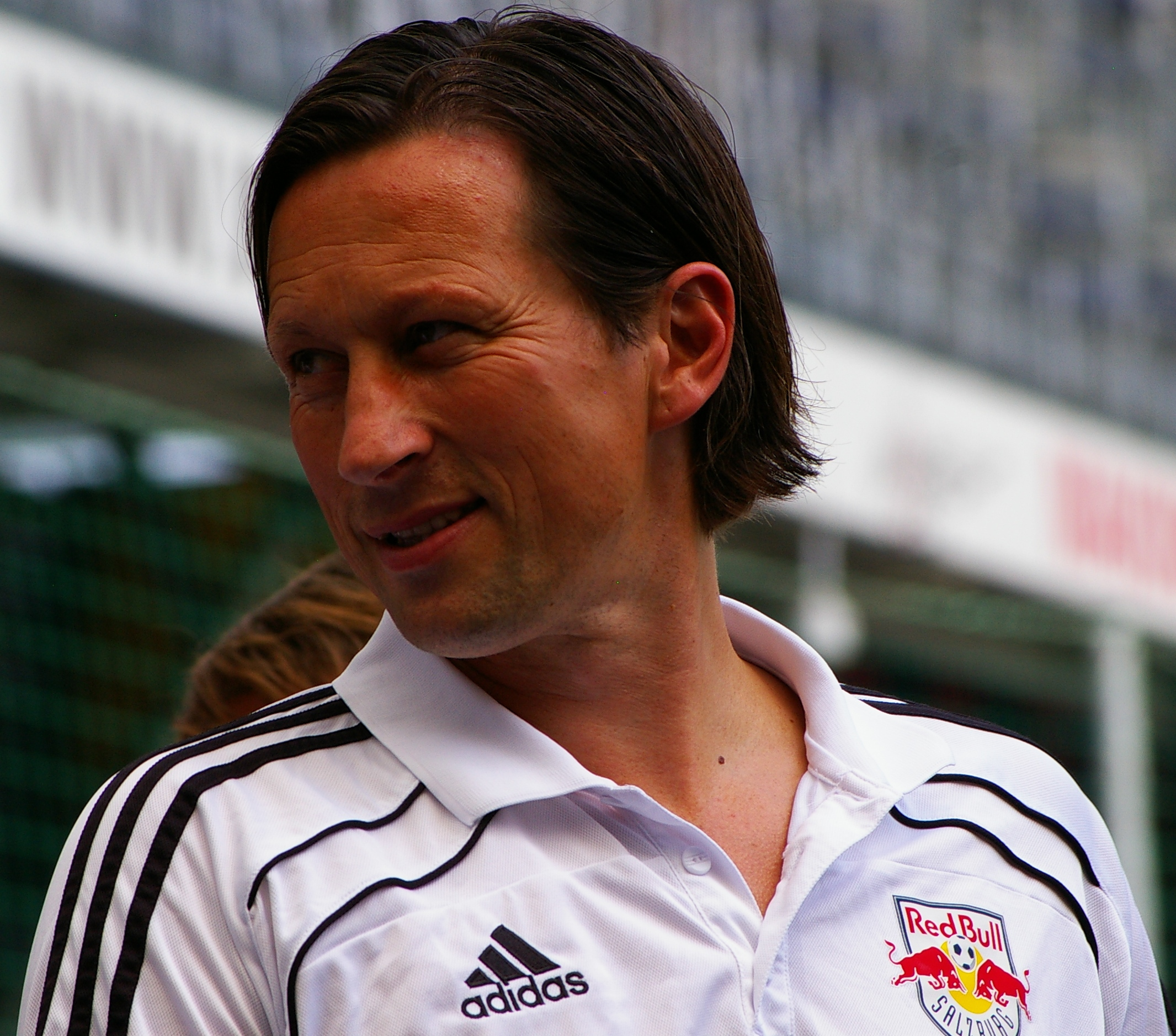
German Roger Schmidt was the team's coach from 2012 until 2014.

In May 2006, Red Bull announced on their website that they had hired veteran Italian coach Giovanni Trapattoni, together with his former player, German FIFA World Cup winner Lothar Matthäus, as co-trainers. The pair initially denied having reached a deal, but officially signed on 23 May 2006. On 28 April 2007, Red Bull ultimately won the 2006–07 Bundesliga by a comfortable margin with five games still left in the season after drawing 2–2 with previous season's champions Austria Wien.

Red Bull were beaten by Shakhtar Donetsk in the third qualifying round of the 2007–08 UEFA Champions League, and were then knocked out of the 2007–08 UEFA Cup in the first round by AEK Athens. On 13 February 2008, Giovanni Trapattoni confirmed that he would be taking over as the new Republic of Ireland national team manager in May. In his final season, the club finished as runners-up, six points behind champions Rapid Wien. Trapattoni was succeeded by Co Adriaanse, under whom they finished as champions, but he left after one year. His successor was Huub Stevens. On 14 May 2010, Stevens' Red Bull retained the Bundesliga.

=== 2010–2020 ===
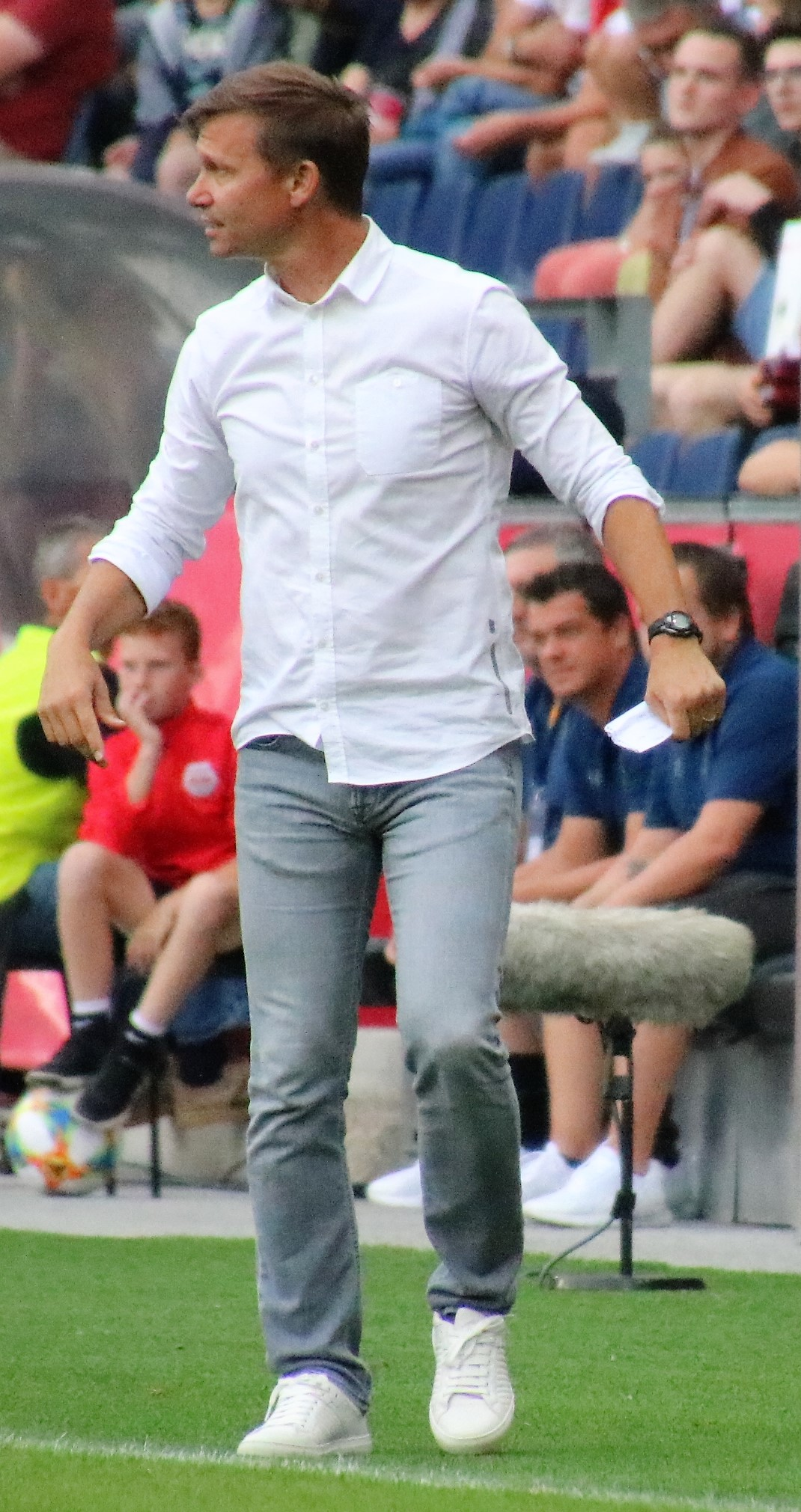
Jesse Marsch – the team's former manager

Stevens was replaced by Dutchman Ricardo Moniz at the end of the 2010–11 season, in which Red Bull were denied a third consecutive title by Sturm Graz, who won the league by a three-point margin. Red Bull finished second in the league, and qualified for the following season's UEFA Europa League. Moniz was ordered to integrate young players from the Junior squad: at the beginning of the 2011–12 season Daniel Offenbacher, Martin Hinteregger, Georg Teigl and Marco Meilinger were promoted to the first team. In the 2011–12 season, Red Bull won the Bundesliga league title and Cup double.

After the 2011–12 season, Moniz departed his post despite having a year remaining on his contract. The new coach for the 2012–13 season was Roger Schmidt, who came from SC Paderborn of the German 2. Bundesliga. In July 2012, Red Bull were knocked out of the Champions League in the second qualifying round against F91 Dudelange of Luxembourg, losing the first leg 1–0 away, followed by a 4–3 home win which saw the club eliminated on away goals.

After that, the team was changed fundamentally. At the end of the transfer period, new players were purchased: Valon Berisha, Kevin Kampl, Håvard Nielsen, Sadio Mané, Isaac Vorsah, and Rodnei. In the 2012–13 season, the team finished second in the league, behind champions Austria Wien. They recaptured the league title the following season with an 11-point margin over the runners-up. Also, in the 2014–15 season, they won both the Bundesliga and the cup as they did again in the 2015–16 season. In December 2014, the coach Peter Zeidler was dismissed and replaced for the last two matches in the first half of the season by Thomas Letsch. Then Óscar García took over.

Also in the next 2016–17 season, Salzburg won both the Bundesliga and the cup. In 2018, Salzburg lost the cup final against Sturm Graz. At the beginning of the 2017–18 season, Marco Rose became coach after Óscar García left the club. In the UEFA Europa League, Salzburg reached the semi-finals in which they lost to Marseille 2–3 on aggregate after extra time, having won during the campaign against Borussia Dortmund and Lazio.

After eleven failed attempts to reach the group stage, Red Bull only managed to qualify directly to the 2019–20 Champions League, since the 2018–19 UEFA Champions League winner, Liverpool, qualified to the competition via their domestic league.

Between 2013 and 2019, Salzburg generated approximately €300 million from transfers of players like Mu'nas Dabbur, Xaver Schlager, Stefan Lainer, Hannes Wolf, Diadie Samassékou, Takumi Minamino, Sadio Mané and Erling Haaland, During this period, the club became known for identifying and developing young talent.

=== 2020–present ===
In 2021, Salzburg had a transfer balance of €218 million for the last five seasons, behind UEFA Champions League participants Ajax (€242 million) and Benfica (more than €335 million). Salzburg had a positive balance in every year. In the 2020–21 and 2021–22 seasons, they reached both the Championship and the Cup finals. In the 2021–22 UEFA Champions League, they reached the knock-out stage for the first time. In the round of 16, they played versus Bayern Munich.

On 17 April 2024, Salzburg qualified for the 2025 FIFA Club World Cup in the United States following Arsenal's elimination from the 2023–24 UEFA Champions League.

On 16 December 2024, Salzburg announced that they are parting ways with Head Coach, Pepijn Lijnders due to poor performances in the 2024–25 UEFA Champions League and Austrian Bundesliga, where the club was chasing a ten-point deficit against the current league leaders.

== Relationship with RB Leipzig ==
In 2009, Red Bull bought an amateur club in Leipzig, Germany and renamed them RasenBallsport Leipzig (so named to circumvent local rules on corporate naming) with the aim of establishing a leading branded team in that country in a similar mould to its existing franchises in Salzburg and other locations. Over the next decade, Leipzig became the owners' main football project, and the close relationship between the teams was exemplified by the number of players moving between them (Georg Teigl, Marcel Sabitzer, Yordy Reyna and Stefan Ilsanker all transferred from Salzburg to Leipzig) with some of the Austrian fans becoming increasingly annoyed at their best players being signed by the 'step-sibling' club in their mission to climb through the levels of German football. There are also links between their youth systems and scouting networks.

Having finished as runners-up in their debut season in the German top flight, RB Leipzig gained entry to continental football for the first time, specifically the 2017–18 UEFA Champions League for which Red Bull Salzburg had also qualified as Austrian champions; this raised the issue of a possible conflict of interest between the clubs due to the level of influence exerted by Red Bull over both teams and the close sporting relationship between them in various aspects. After examining the operational structures during June 2017, UEFA declared themselves satisfied under their regulations that the two clubs (particularly Salzburg) were suitably independent from the Red Bull corporation, and sufficiently distinct from one another, for both to be admitted to their competitions. In the first season following that ruling, both reached the quarter-finals of the 2017–18 UEFA Europa League but did not play each other, with RB Leipzig eliminated by Marseille, who then also knocked out Salzburg in the semi-finals. However, in the next edition of the same competition, RB Leipzig and Red Bull Salzburg were drawn together in Group B to meet competitively for the first time. Salzburg were the victors in both fixtures between the clubs (3–2 in Germany, 1–0 in Austria) and also won all their other matches to top the group, while Leipzig failed to progress after dropping further points against Celtic and Rosenborg. In December 2020, Dominik Szoboszlai poised to become the second RB Salzburg player to move to RB Leipzig in space of six months, after Hwang Hee-chan completed the switch in summer. In 2023, they completed deals of both Nicolas Seiwald (€20 million) and Benjamin Šeško (€24 million) from Salzburg for a total of €54 million.

== Honours ==
Type	Competition	Titles	Seasons
Domestic	Austrian Bundesliga	17	1993–94*, 1994–95*, 1996–97*, 2006–07, 2008–09, 2009–10, 2011–12, 2013–14, 2014–15, 2015–16, 2016–17, 2017–18, 2018–19, 2019–20, 2020–21, 2021–22, 2022–23
Domestic	2. Liga (Austria)	2	1977–78*, 1986–87*
Domestic	Austrian Cup	9	2011–12, 2013–14, 2014–15, 2015–16, 2016–17, 2018–19, 2019–20, 2020–21, 2021–22
Domestic	Austrian Supercup	3	1994*, 1995*, 1997*
Continental (Youth Team)	UEFA Youth League	1	2016–17
Continental (Youth Team)	Blue Stars/FIFA Youth Cup	1	2024

=== Europeans Distinctions ===
- UEFA Cup/UEFA Europa League
  - Runners-up (1): 1993–94
  - Semifinals (1): 2017–18

==== Youth Team ====
- UEFA Youth League
  - Runners-up (1): 2021–22
  - Semifinals (2): 2019–20, 2024–25

== Name and crest ==
=== Club name history ===
- 1933 to 1946: SV Austria Salzburg (merger of FC Rapid Salzburg and FC Hertha Salzburg)
- 1946 to 1950: TSV Austria Salzburg (merger with ATSV Salzburg)
- 1950 to 1973: SV Austria Salzburg (merger dissolved)
- 1973 to 1976: SV Gerngroß A. Salzburg (Gerngroß Department Store sponsorship)
- 1976 to 1978: SV Sparkasse Austria Salzburg (Erste Group savings bank sponsorship)
- 1978 to 1997: SV Casino Salzburg (Casinos Austria sponsorship)
- 1997 to 2005: SV Wüstenrot Salzburg (Wüstenrot-Gruppe sponsorship)
- 2005 to present: FC Red Bull Salzburg (FC Salzburg in European competition)

Red Bull Salzburg's name and crest have changed several times throughout the club's history as a result of mergers, sponsorships, and acquisitions. Though "Austria" has not been part of the club's name since 1978, until 2005 the club had been colloquially referred to as Austria Salzburg by fans and media.

Due to UEFA sponsorship regulations, "Red Bull" may not be present in the club's name or crest in international European competitions. The club plays as FC Salzburg and uses a modified crest, with Red Bull present only on their kits as a sponsor.

=== Club crest history ===
Primary crest
SV Casino Salzburg crest (1978–1997)

Club crest since 2007 (star added in 2019 to designate ten Bundesliga titles)

Club crest used in FIFA and UEFA competitions since 2022

== International competition history ==
=== Overall record ===
Accurate as of 15 October 2026

Competition	Played	Won	Drew	Lost	GF	GA	GD	Win%
UEFA Champions League	108	40	26	42	149	161	−12	37.04
Cup Winners' Cup	2	0	0	2	0	8	−8	0.00
UEFA Cup / UEFA Europa League	136	69	18	49	216	168	+48	50.74
UEFA Intertoto Cup	12	4	3	5	22	19	+3	33.33
FIFA Club World Cup	3	1	1	1	2	4	−2	33.33
Total	261	114	48	99	389	360	+29	43.68

Legend: GF = Goals for; GA = Goals against; GD = Goal difference

- Q = Qualification
- PO = Play-off
- KPO = Knockout Play-Off
- QF = Quarter-final
- SF = Semi-final

=== Matches ===
Season	Competition	Round	Country	Opponent	Home	Away	Aggregate
1971–72	UEFA Cup	1	(Romania)	UT Arad	3–1	1–4	4–5
1976–77	UEFA Cup	1	(Turkey)	Adanaspor	5–0	0–2	5–2
1976–77	UEFA Cup	2	(Socialist Federal Republic of Yugoslavia)	Red Star Belgrade	2–1	0–1	2–2
1980–81	European Cup Winners' Cup	1	(West Germany)	Fortuna Düsseldorf	0–3	0–5	0–8
1992–93	UEFA Cup	1	(Netherlands)	Ajax	0–3	1–3	1–6
1993–94	UEFA Cup	1	(Slovakia)	DAC Dunajska Streda	2–0	2–0	4–0
1993–94	UEFA Cup	2	(Belgium)	Antwerp	1–0	1–0	2–0
1993–94	UEFA Cup	3	(Portugal)	Sporting CP	3–0 (a.e.t.)	0–2	3–2
1993–94	UEFA Cup	QF	(Germany)	Eintracht Frankfurt	1–0	0–1	1–1 (5–4 p.)
1993–94	UEFA Cup	SF	(Germany)	Karlsruher SC	0–0	1–1	1–1
1993–94	UEFA Cup	Final	(Italy)	Internazionale	0–1	0–1	0–2
1994–95	UEFA Champions League as Casino Salzburg	Q1	(Israel)	Maccabi Haifa	3–1	2–1	5–2
1994–95	UEFA Champions League as Casino Salzburg	Group D	(Greece)	AEK Athens	0–0	3–1	3rd place
1994–95	UEFA Champions League as Casino Salzburg	Group D	(Italy)	Milan	0–1	0–3	3rd place
1994–95	UEFA Champions League as Casino Salzburg	Group D	(Netherlands)	Ajax	0–0	1–1	3rd place
1995–96	UEFA Champions League	Q1	(Romania)	Steaua București	0–0	0–1	0–1
1997–98	UEFA Champions League	Q2	(Czech Republic)	Sparta Prague	0–0	0–3	0–3
1997–98	UEFA Cup	1	(Belgium)	Anderlecht	4–3	2–4	6–7
1998	UEFA Intertoto Cup	2	(Switzerland)	St. Gallen	3–1	0–1	3–2
1998	UEFA Intertoto Cup	3	(Netherlands)	Twente	3–1	2–2	5–3
1998	UEFA Intertoto Cup	4	(Netherlands)	Fortuna Sittard	3–1	1–2	4–3
1998	UEFA Intertoto Cup	5	(Spain)	Valencia	0–2	1–2	1–4
2000	UEFA Intertoto Cup	2	(Moldova)	Nistru Otaci	1–1	6–2	7–3
2000	UEFA Intertoto Cup	3	(Belgium)	Standard Liège	1–1	1–3	2–4
2003–04	UEFA Cup	1	(Italy)	Udinese	0–1	2–1	2–2
2003–04	UEFA Cup	2	(Italy)	Parma	0–4	0–5	0–9
2006–07	UEFA Champions League	Q2	(Switzerland)	Zürich	2–0	1–2	3–2
2006–07	UEFA Champions League	Q3	(Spain)	Valencia	1–0	0–3	1–3
2006–07	UEFA Cup	1	(England)	Blackburn Rovers	2–2	0–2	2–4
2007–08	UEFA Champions League	Q2	(Latvia)	Ventspils	4–0	3–0	7–0
2007–08	UEFA Champions League	Q3	(Ukraine)	Shakhtar Donetsk	1–0	1–3	2–3
2007–08	UEFA Cup	1	(Greece)	AEK Athens	1–0	0–3	1–3
2008–09	UEFA Cup	Q1	(Armenia)	Banants	7–0	3–0	10–0
2008–09	UEFA Cup	Q2	(Lithuania)	Sūduva Marijampolė	0–1	4–1	4–2
2008–09	UEFA Cup	1	(Spain)	Sevilla	0–2	0–2	0–4
2009–10	UEFA Champions League	Q2	(Republic of Ireland)	Bohemians	1–1	1–0	2–1
2009–10	UEFA Champions League	Q3	(Croatia)	Dinamo Zagreb	1–1	2–1	3–2
2009–10	UEFA Champions League	PO	(Israel)	Maccabi Haifa	1–2	0–3	1–5
2009–10	UEFA Europa League	Group G	(Italy)	Lazio	2–1	2–1	1st place
2009–10	UEFA Europa League	Group G	(Spain)	Villarreal	2–0	1–0	1st place
2009–10	UEFA Europa League	Group G	(Bulgaria)	Levski Sofia	1–0	1–0	1st place
2009–10	UEFA Europa League	Round of 32	(Belgium)	Standard Liège	0–0	2–3	2–3
2010–11	UEFA Champions League	Q2	(Faroe Islands)	HB Tórshavn	5–0	0–1	5–1
2010–11	UEFA Champions League	Q3	(Cyprus)	Omonia	4–1	1–1	5–2
2010–11	UEFA Champions League	PO	(Israel)	Hapoel Tel Aviv	2–3	1–1	3–4
2010–11	UEFA Europa League	Group A	(England)	Manchester City	0–2	0–3	4th place
2010–11	UEFA Europa League	Group A	(Poland)	Lech Poznań	0–1	0–2	4th place
2010–11	UEFA Europa League	Group A	(Italy)	Juventus	1–1	0–0	4th place
2011–12	UEFA Europa League	Q2	(Latvia)	Liepājas Metalurgs	4–1	0–0	4–1
2011–12	UEFA Europa League	Q3	(Slovakia)	Senica	1–0	3–0	4–0
2011–12	UEFA Europa League	PO	(Cyprus)	Omonia	1–0	1–2	2–2
2011–12	UEFA Europa League	Group F	(Slovakia)	Slovan Bratislava	3–0	3–2	2nd place
2011–12	UEFA Europa League	Group F	(Spain)	Athletic Bilbao	0–1	2–2	2nd place
2011–12	UEFA Europa League	Group F	(France)	Paris Saint-Germain	2–0	1–3	2nd place
2011–12	UEFA Europa League	Round of 32	(Ukraine)	Metalist Kharkiv	0–4	1–4	1–8
2012–13	UEFA Champions League	Q2	(Luxembourg)	F91 Dudelange	4–3	0–1	4–4
2013–14	UEFA Champions League	Q3	(Turkey)	Fenerbahçe	1–1	1–3	2–4
2013–14	UEFA Europa League	PO	(Lithuania)	Žalgiris Vilnius	5–0	2–0	7–0
2013–14	UEFA Europa League	Group C	(Sweden)	Elfsborg	4–0	1–0	1st place
2013–14	UEFA Europa League	Group C	(Denmark)	Esbjerg	3–0	2–1	1st place
2013–14	UEFA Europa League	Group C	(Belgium)	Standard Liège	2–1	3–1	1st place
2013–14	UEFA Europa League	Round of 32	(Netherlands)	Ajax	3–1	3–0	6–1
2013–14	UEFA Europa League	Round of 16	(Switzerland)	Basel	1–2	0–0	1–2
2014–15	UEFA Champions League	3Q	(Azerbaijan)	Qarabağ	2–0	1–2	3–2
2014–15	UEFA Champions League	PO	(Sweden)	Malmö FF	2–1	0–3	2–4
2014–15	UEFA Europa League	Group D	(Scotland)	Celtic	2–2	3–1	1st place
2014–15	UEFA Europa League	Group D	(Romania)	Astra Giurgiu	5–1	2–1	1st place
2014–15	UEFA Europa League	Group D	(Croatia)	Dinamo Zagreb	4–2	5–1	1st place
2014–15	UEFA Europa League	Round of 32	(Spain)	Villarreal	1–3	1–2	2–5
2015–16	UEFA Champions League	3Q	(Sweden)	Malmö FF	2–0	0–3	2–3
2015–16	UEFA Europa League	PO	(Belarus)	Dinamo Minsk	2–0	0–2	2–2 (2–3 p.)
2016–17	UEFA Champions League	2Q	(Latvia)	FK Liepāja	1–0	2–0	3–0
2016–17	UEFA Champions League	3Q	(Albania)	Partizani	2–0	1–0	3–0
2016–17	UEFA Champions League	PO	(Croatia)	Dinamo Zagreb	1–2 (a.e.t.)	1–1	2–3
2016–17	UEFA Europa League	Group I	(Germany)	Schalke 04	2–0	1–3	3rd place
2016–17	UEFA Europa League	Group I	(Russia)	Krasnodar	0–1	1–1	3rd place
2016–17	UEFA Europa League	Group I	(France)	Nice	0–1	2–0	3rd place
2017–18	UEFA Champions League	2Q	(Malta)	Hibernians	3–0	3–0	6–0
2017–18	UEFA Champions League	3Q	(Croatia)	Rijeka	1–1	0–0	1–1 (a)
2017–18	UEFA Europa League	PO	(Romania)	Viitorul Constanța	4–0	3–1	7–1
2017–18	UEFA Europa League	Group I	(France)	Marseille	1–0	0–0	1st place
2017–18	UEFA Europa League	Group I	(Portugal)	Vitória de Guimarães	3–0	1–1	1st place
2017–18	UEFA Europa League	Group I	(Turkey)	Konyaspor	0–0	2–0	1st place
2017–18	UEFA Europa League	Round of 32	(Spain)	Real Sociedad	2–1	2–2	4–3
2017–18	UEFA Europa League	Round of 16	(Germany)	Borussia Dortmund	0–0	2–1	2–1
2017–18	UEFA Europa League	QF	(Italy)	Lazio	4–1	2–4	6–5
2017–18	UEFA Europa League	SF	(France)	Marseille	2–1 (a.e.t.)	0–2	2–3
2018–19	UEFA Champions League	3Q	(North Macedonia)	Shkëndija	3–0	1–0	4–0
2018–19	UEFA Champions League	PO	(Serbia)	Red Star Belgrade	2–2	0–0	2–2 (a)
2018–19	UEFA Europa League	Group B	(Norway)	Rosenborg	3–0	5–2	1st place
2018–19	UEFA Europa League	Group B	(Scotland)	Celtic	3–1	2–1	1st place
2018–19	UEFA Europa League	Group B	(Germany)	RB Leipzig	1–0	3–2	1st place
2018–19	UEFA Europa League	Round of 32	(Belgium)	Club Brugge	4–0	1–2	5–2
2018–19	UEFA Europa League	Round of 16	(Italy)	Napoli	3–1	0–3	3–4
2019–20	UEFA Champions League	Group E	(Belgium)	Genk	6–2	4–1	3rd place
2019–20	UEFA Champions League	Group E	(Italy)	Napoli	2–3	1–1	3rd place
2019–20	UEFA Champions League	Group E	(England)	Liverpool	0–2	3–4	3rd place
2019–20	UEFA Europa League	Round of 32	(Germany)	Eintracht Frankfurt	2–2	1–4	3–6
2020–21	UEFA Champions League	PO	(Israel)	Maccabi Tel Aviv	3–1	2–1	5–2
2020–21	UEFA Champions League	Group A	(Germany)	Bayern Munich	2–6	1–3	3rd place
2020–21	UEFA Champions League	Group A	(Spain)	Atlético Madrid	0–2	2–3	3rd place
2020–21	UEFA Champions League	Group A	(Russia)	Lokomotiv Moscow	2–2	3–1	3rd place
2020–21	UEFA Europa League	Round of 32	(Spain)	Villarreal	0–2	1–2	1–4
2021–22	UEFA Champions League	PO	(Denmark)	Brøndby	2–1	2–1	4–2
2021–22	UEFA Champions League	Group G	(Spain)	Sevilla	1–0	1–1	2nd place
2021–22	UEFA Champions League	Group G	(France)	Lille	2–1	0–1	2nd place
2021–22	UEFA Champions League	Group G	(Germany)	VfL Wolfsburg	3–1	1–2	2nd place
2021–22	UEFA Champions League	Round of 16	(Germany)	Bayern Munich	1–1	1–7	2–8
2022–23	UEFA Champions League	Group E	(Italy)	Milan	1–1	0–4	3rd place
2022–23	UEFA Champions League	Group E	(England)	Chelsea	1–2	1–1	3rd place
2022–23	UEFA Champions League	Group E	(Croatia)	Dinamo Zagreb	1–0	1–1	3rd place
2022–23	UEFA Europa League	KPO	(Italy)	Roma	1–0	0–2	1–2
2023–24	UEFA Champions League	Group D	(Portugal)	Benfica	1–3	2–0	4th place
2023–24	UEFA Champions League	Group D	(Spain)	Real Sociedad	0–2	0–0	4th place
2023–24	UEFA Champions League	Group D	(Italy)	Internazionale	0–1	1–2	4th place
2024–25	UEFA Champions League	3Q	(Netherlands)	Twente	2–1	3–3	5–4
2024–25	UEFA Champions League	PO	(Ukraine)	Dynamo Kyiv	1–1	2–0	3–1
2024–25	UEFA Champions League	League phase	(Czech Republic)	Sparta Prague	—N/a	0–3	34th place
2024–25	UEFA Champions League	League phase	(France)	Brest	0–4	—N/a	34th place
2024–25	UEFA Champions League	League phase	(Croatia)	Dinamo Zagreb	0–2	—N/a	34th place
2024–25	UEFA Champions League	League phase	(Netherlands)	Feyenoord	—N/a	3–1	34th place
2024–25	UEFA Champions League	League phase	(Germany)	Bayer Leverkusen	—N/a	0–5	34th place
2024–25	UEFA Champions League	League phase	(France)	Paris Saint-Germain	0–3	—N/a	34th place
2024–25	UEFA Champions League	League phase	(Spain)	Real Madrid	—N/a	1–5	34th place
2024–25	UEFA Champions League	League phase	(Spain)	Atlético Madrid	1–4	—N/a	34th place
2025	FIFA Club World Cup	Group H	(Mexico)	Pachuca	2–1 (N)		3rd place
2025	FIFA Club World Cup	Group H	(Saudi Arabia)	Al-Hilal	0–0 (N)		3rd place
2025	FIFA Club World Cup	Group H	(Spain)	Real Madrid	0–3 (N)		3rd place
2025–26	UEFA Champions League	2Q	(Norway)	Brann	1–1	4–1	5–2
2025–26	UEFA Champions League	3Q	(Belgium)	Club Brugge	0–1	2–3	2–4
2025–26	UEFA Europa League	League phase	(Portugal)	Porto	0–1	—N/a	31st place
2025–26	UEFA Europa League	League phase	(France)	Lyon	—N/a	0–2	31st place
2025–26	UEFA Europa League	League phase	(Hungary)	Ferencváros	2–3	—N/a	31st place
2025–26	UEFA Europa League	League phase	(Netherlands)	Go Ahead Eagles	2–0	—N/a	31st place
2025–26	UEFA Europa League	League phase	(Italy)	Bologna	—N/a	1–4	31st place
2025–26	UEFA Europa League	League phase	(Germany)	SC Freiburg	—N/a	0–1	31st place
2025–26	UEFA Europa League	League phase	(Switzerland)	Basel	3–1	—N/a	31st place
2025–26	UEFA Europa League	League phase	(England)	Aston Villa	—N/a	2–3	31st place
2026–27	UEFA Europa League	3Q	(Cyprus)	Pafos	1–0	3–3	4–3
2026–27	UEFA Europa League	PO	(Sweden)	Mjällby AIF	3–0	1–0	4–0
2026–27	UEFA Europa League	League phase	(Bulgaria)	Levski Sofia	—N/a	1–0	
2026–27	UEFA Europa League	League phase	(Italy)	Milan	0–4	—N/a	
2026–27	UEFA Europa League	League phase	(Slovenia)	Celje	—N/a		
2026–27	UEFA Europa League	League phase	(Belgium)	Anderlecht	—N/a		
2026–27	UEFA Europa League	League phase	(Armenia)	Ararat-Armenia		—N/a	
2026–27	UEFA Europa League	League phase	(Czech Republic)	Sparta Prague		—N/a	
2026–27	UEFA Europa League	League phase	(Germany)	Bayer Leverkusen	—N/a		
2026–27	UEFA Europa League	League phase	(England)	Crystal Palace		—N/a	

=== UEFA coefficient ranking ===
As of 2 June 2026

Rank	Country	Team	Points
57	(Austria)	Red Bull Salzburg	45.000

== Players ==
=== Current squad ===
As of 2 September 2026

Note: Flags indicate national team as defined under FIFA eligibility rules; some limited exceptions apply. Players may hold more than one non-FIFA nationality.

No.	Pos.	Nation	Player
1	GK	GER	Christian Früchtl
4	DF	SWE	John Mellberg
5	MF	MLI	Soumaïla Diabaté
7	MF	GER	Umut Tohumcu (on loan from TSG Hoffenheim)
8	MF	JPN	Sōta Kitano
9	FW	BIH	Haris Tabaković
11	FW	BEL	Yorbe Vertessen
13	DF	GER	Frans Krätzig
15	MF	POL	Bartosz Mazurek
18	DF	AUT	Nikolas Veratschnig
19	FW	CIV	Karim Konaté
20	FW	GHA	Edmund Baidoo
21	DF	GER	Tim Drexler
22	DF	AUT	Stefan Lainer
23	FW	HUN	Damir Redzic

No.	Pos.	Nation	Player
27	MF	AUT	Johannes Moser
28	MF	SRB	Filip Matijašević
30	FW	MLI	Gaoussou Diakité
31	DF	SUI	Dominik Schmid
32	MF	GAM	Abubakr Barry
33	FW	BFA	Aboubacar Camara
35	FW	DEN	Jesper Lindstrøm (on loan from Napoli)
36	MF	AUT	Justin Omoregie
39	DF	GER	Leandro Morgalla
41	GK	AUT	Nikola Šarčević
43	FW	SUI	Enrique Aguilar
44	DF	TOG	Kévin Boma
47	DF	AUT	Valentin Zabransky
52	GK	AUT	Christian Zawieschitzky
91	DF	JPN	Anrie Chase

=== Out on loan ===
As of 1 September 2026

Note: Flags indicate national team as defined under FIFA eligibility rules; some limited exceptions apply. Players may hold more than one non-FIFA nationality.

No.	Pos.	Nation	Player
—	DF	GER	Hendry Blank (at Greuther Fürth until 30 June 2027)
—	DF	BFA	Lassina Traoré (at FC Liefering until 30 June 2027)
—	DF	AUT	Tim Trummer (at Grazer AK until 30 June 2027)
—	MF	DEN	Clement Bischoff (at NEC until 30 June 2027)

No.	Pos.	Nation	Player
—	MF	CRO	Oliver Lukić (at TSV Hartberg until 30 June 2027)
—	MF	COL	Mayker Palacios (at FC Liefering until 30 June 2027)
—	FW	VEN	Yerwin Sulbarán (at FC Liefering until 30 June 2027)

== Coaching staff ==
As of 26th June 2026

Position	Staff
Head coach	(Germany) Danny Röhl
Assistant coach	(Luxembourg) Raphael Duarte
Goalkeeper coach	(Portugal) Pedro Pereira (Austria) David Schartner
Fitness coach	(Austria) Sebastian Kirchner (Spain) Adrián Jiménez Leiva (Germany) Lukas Lackner
Video analyst	(Germany) Tim Stenske (Austria) Rainer Sonnberger (Germany) Tim Cezanne
Club doctor	(Germany) Dr. Antonius Antoniadis (Austria) Jürgen Herfert
Physiotherapist	(Austria) Cornelia Werdenich (Germany) Ferdinand Renner (Austria) Philipp Schopper
Rehabilitation therapist	(United States) Scott Eisele
Nutritionist	(Germany) Lena Schlurmann
Team manager	(Austria) Mark Lang (Germany) Fatih Aslan
Kit co-ordinator	(Austria) Thomas Strasser (Turkey) Hakan Efe
Chef de cuisine	(Austria) Tobias Brunner (Austria) Paul Weiss
Players relation and integration assistant	(Algeria) Mustapha Mesloub

== FC Liefering ==
Since 2012, FC Liefering, currently participating in the Austrian second League, has been a farm team for Red Bull Salzburg.

== Coaching history ==
- (Nazi Germany) K. Bauer (1933–1939)
- (Nazi Germany) Wache (1945)
- (Austria) Anton Janda (1946–1947)
- (Austria) Ernst Schönfeld (1952)
- (Austria) Max Breitenfelder (1953)
- (Austria) Karl Sesta (1954–55)
- (Austria) Josef Graf (1955)
- (Austria) Gyula Szomoray (1956–57)
- (Austria) Günter Praschak (1957)
- (Austria) Franz Feldinger (1958)
- (Austria) Karl Humenberger (1959)
- (Austria) Erich Probst (1959–60)
- (Austria) Karl Vetter (1960–61)
- (Austria) Ignac Molnár (1962–63)
- (Austria) Günter Praschak (1965–69)
- (Austria) Karl Schlechta (1969–71)
- (Austria) Erich Hof (1 July 1971 – 31 December 1971)
- (West Germany) Michael Pfeiffer (1972)
- (Socialist Federal Republic of Yugoslavia) Josip Šikić (1972–73)
- (Austria) Günter Praschak (1973–75)
- (Austria) Alfred Günthner (1975)
- (West Germany) Hans Reich (1976)
- (Austria) Günter Praschak (1977)
- (Austria) Alfred Günthner (1977–80)
- (Austria) Rudolf Strittich (1980)
- (Austria) August Starek (5 October 1980 – 30 June 1981)
- (Austria) Joszef Obert (1 July 1981 – 11 May 1984)
- (Austria) Hannes Winklbauer (13 May 1984 – 2 November 1985)
- (Austria) Adolf Blutsch (6 November 1985 – 30 June 1986)
- (Austria) Hannes Winklbauer (1 July 1986 – 16 April 1988)
- (Germany) Kurt Wiebach (18 April 1988 – 30 June 1991)
- (Croatia) Otto Barić (11 July 1991 – 29 August 1995)
- (Austria) Hermann Stessl (29 August 1995 – 2 March 1996)
- (Austria) Heribert Weber (7 March 1996 – 31 March 1998)
- (Austria) Hans Krankl (2 April 1998 – 9 January 2000)
- (Federal Republic of Yugoslavia) Miroslav Polak (10 January 2000 – 30 June 2000)
- (Sweden) Hans Backe (1 July 2000 – 10 September 2001)
- (Denmark) Lars Søndergaard (11 September 2001 – 29 October 2003)
- (Germany) Peter Assion (int.) (1 November 2003 – 31 December 2003)
- (Austria) Walter Hörmann (int.) (1 January 2004 – 15 March 2004)
- (Germany) Peter Assion (16 March 2004 – 31 March 2005)
- (Croatia) Nikola Jurčević (7 March 2005 – 18 April 2005)
- (Austria) Manfred Linzmaier (int.) (18 April 2005 – 30 June 2005)
- (Austria) Kurt Jara (1 July 2005 – 31 May 2006)
- (Italy) Giovanni Trapattoni (1 June 2006 – 30 April 2008)
- (Netherlands) Co Adriaanse (1 July 2008 – 15 June 2009)
- (Netherlands) Huub Stevens (15 June 2009 – 8 April 2011)
- (Netherlands) Ricardo Moniz (8 April 2011 – 12 June 2012)
- (Germany) Roger Schmidt (1 July 2012 – 31 May 2014)
- (Austria) Adi Hütter (1 June 2014 – 15 June 2015)
- (Germany) Peter Zeidler (22 June 2015 – 3 December 2015)
- (Germany) Thomas Letsch (int.) (3 December 2015 – 28 December 2015)
- (Spain) Óscar García (28 December 2015 – 15 June 2017)
- (Germany) Marco Rose (23 June 2017 – 20 June 2019)
- (United States) Jesse Marsch (20 June 2019 – 30 June 2021)
- (Germany) Matthias Jaissle (1 July 2021 – 28 July 2023)
- (Austria) Alexander Hauser (int.) (28 July 2023 – 31 July 2023)
- (Austria) Gerhard Struber (31 July 2023 – 15 April 2024)
- (Germany) Onur Cinel (int.) (15 April 2024 – 15 May 2024)
- (Netherlands) Pepijn Lijnders (15 May 2024 – 16 December 2024)
- (Germany) Thomas Letsch (18 December 2024 – 17 February 2026)
- (Austria) Daniel Beichler (18 February 2026 – 18 May 2026)
- (Germany) Danny Röhl (17 June 2026 - Present)

== See also ==
- RB Leipzig
- New York Red Bulls
- Red Bull Bragantino
- EHC Red Bull München
- EC Red Bull Salzburg
