= Filip Matijašević =

Serbian footballer (born 2008)

Personal information
- Date of birth: 14 March 2008 (age 18)
- Place of birth: Belgrade, Serbia
- Height: 1.91 m (6 ft 3 in)
- Positions: Midfielder; winger; forward

Team information
- Current team: Red Bull Salzburg
- Number: 28

Youth career
- –2025: Čukarički

Senior career*
Years	Team	Apps	(Gls)
2024–2026	Čukarički	37	(4)
2026–	Red Bull Salzburg	0	(0)

International career^{‡}
2022	Serbia U15	5	(2)
2023–2024	Serbia U16	6	(2)
2024	Serbia U17	4	(0)
2025	Serbia U18	2	(2)
2025–	Serbia U19	2	(0)
- * Club domestic league appearances and goals as of 12 June 2026 ‡ National team caps and goals as of 15 November 2025

Filip Matijašević (Serbian Cyrillic: Филип Матијашевић; born 4 March 2008) is a Serbian professional footballer who plays as a midfielder, winger, or forward for Austrian Bundesliga club Red Bull Salzburg.

== Early life ==
Matijašević was born on 4 March 2008. Born in Belgrade, Serbia, he is the son of Serbian footballer Vladimir Matijašević.

== Club career ==
As a youth player, Matijašević joined the youth academy of Serbian side Čukarički and was promoted to the club's senior team in 2024, where he made thirty-four league appearances and scored four goals. Serbian news website Mozzart Sport wrote in 2025 that he was "a regular in [manager] Milan Lešnjak's team" while playing for the club. Following his stint there, he signed for Austrian side Red Bull Salzburg ahead of the 2026–27 season.

== International career ==
Matijašević is a Serbia youth international. During the autumn of 2024, he played for the Serbia under-17 team for 2025 UEFA European Under-17 Championship qualification.
