= List of Austrian football transfers summer 2026 =

This is a list of Austrian football transfers for the 2026 summer transfer window. Only transfers featuring Austrian Football Bundesliga are listed.

== Austrian Football Bundesliga ==
Note: Flags indicate national team as has been defined under FIFA eligibility rules. Players may hold more than one non-FIFA nationality.

=== LASK ===
In:

No.	Pos.	Nation	Player
3	DF	ENG	Miguel Freckleton (from (Scotland) St Mirren)
9	MF	CZE	Kryštof Daněk (from (Czech Republic) Sparta Prague, previously on loan)
10	MF	CRO	Robert Ljubičić (on loan from (Greece) AEK Athens)
11	FW	AUT	Saša Kalajdžić (from (England) Wolverhampton Wanderers, previously on loan)
18	MF	AUT	Alessandro Schöpf (from Wolfsberger AC)
21	DF	COD	Manoël Verhaeghe (from (Belgium) RWDM Brussels)
22	FW	FRA	Ramiz Harakaté (from Grazer AK)
23	DF	LBA	Daniel Elfadli (on loan from (Germany) Hamburger SV)
25	DF	CMR	Yvan Dibango (from (Ukraine) Kryvbas Kryvyi Rih)
43	DF	BRA	Alemão (from (Portugal) Portimonense, previously on loan)

Out:

No.	Pos.	Nation	Player
4	MF	MLI	Ismaila Coulibaly (to (Belgium) RAAL La Louvière)
11	FW	AUT	Maximilian Entrup (to (Germany) Eintracht Braunschweig)
13	MF	NGR	Adetunji Adeshina (on loan to (Croatia) Slaven Belupo)
41	DF	NGR	Emmanuel Michael (on loan to Admira Wacker)
44	MF	CRO	Lukas Kačavenda (loan return to (Croatia) Dinamo Zagreb)
48	DF	SEN	Modou Kéba Cissé (to (England) Aston Villa)
51	FW	NGR	Vincent Augustus (on loan to SKU Amstetten)
—	FW	AUT	Elias Havel (to TSV Hartberg, previously on loan)

=== Sturm Graz ===
In:

No.	Pos.	Nation	Player
2	DF	GER	Joshua Quarshie (on loan from (England) Southampton)
14	FW	CIV	Oumar Diakité (on loan from (France) Reims, previously on loan at (Belgium) Cercle Brugge)
19	MF	AUT	Simon Seidl (from Blau-Weiß Linz)
21	DF	SRB	Petar Petrović (from (Serbia) Javor Ivanjica)
22	GK	AUT	Ammar Helac (from TSV Hartberg)
27	DF	VEN	Luis Balbo (from (Italy) Fiorentina)
28	DF	AUT	Jürgen Heil (from TSV Hartberg)
44	FW	GER	Nelson Weiper (on loan from (Germany) Mainz 05)
78	MF	KOS	Valmir Matoshi (from (Switzerland) Thun)
—	DF	CRC	Jeyland Mitchell (from (Netherlands) Feyenoord, previously on loan)
—	MF	FRA	Anis Mathurin (from (France) Auxerre youth)

Out:

No.	Pos.	Nation	Player
9	FW	SCO	Rory Wilson (loan return to (England) Aston Villa)
17	DF	BIH	Emir Karić (to (United States) Sporting Kansas City)
24	DF	BEL	Dimitri Lavalée (to (Belgium) Standard Liège)
25	MF	AUT	Stefan Hierländer (retired)
40	GK	AUT	Matteo Bignetti (to (Germany) 1. FC Saarbrücken)
44	DF	BIH	Jusuf Gazibegović (loan return to (Germany) 1. FC Köln)
47	DF	AUT	Emanuel Aiwu (to (Cyprus) Apollon Limassol)
77	FW	GER	Maurice Malone (to (United States) Minnesota United)
80	MF	CMR	Ryan Fosso (to (Belgium) Standard Liège)
—	DF	CRC	Jeyland Mitchell (to (France) Strasbourg)
—	MF	AUT	Tim Huber (on loan to SC Kalsdorf)
—	MF	FRA	Anis Mathurin (on loan to SC Kalsdorf)
—	DF	AUT	David Burger (to TSV Hartberg II, previously on loan at SC Kalsdorf)
—	FW	AUT	Peter Kiedl (to (Germany) Hansa Rostock, previously on loan at SV Ried)
—	FW	MLI	Amady Camara (to (Denmark) Randers, previously on loan at (France) Nantes)

=== Red Bull Salzburg ===
In:

No.	Pos.	Nation	Player
1	GK	GER	Christian Früchtl (from (Italy) Lecce)
7	MF	GER	Umut Tohumcu (on loan from (Germany) TSG Hoffenheim, previously on loan at (Germany) Holstein Kiel)
9	FW	BIH	Haris Tabaković (from (Germany) TSG Hoffenheim, previously on loan at (Germany) Borussia Mönchengladbach)
15	MF	POL	Bartosz Mazurek (from (Poland) Jagiellonia Białystok)
18	DF	AUT	Nikolas Veratschnig (from (Germany) Mainz 05)
28	MF	SRB	Filip Matijašević (from (Serbia) Čukarički)
31	DF	SUI	Dominik Schmid (from (Switzerland) Basel)
32	MF	GAM	Abubakr Barry (from Austria Wien)
35	MF	DEN	Jesper Lindstrøm (on loan from (Italy) Napoli, previously on loan at (Germany) VfL Wolfsburg)
44	DF	TOG	Kévin Boma (from (Portugal) Estoril)
—	FW	VEN	Yerwin Sulbarán (from (Venezuela) Monagas)

Out:

No.	Pos.	Nation	Player
1	GK	AUT	Alexander Schlager (to (Germany) Werder Bremen)
3	DF	SRB	Aleksa Terzić (to (Italy) Frosinone)
7	MF	DEN	Clement Bischoff (on loan to (Netherlands) NEC)
9	FW	AUT	Karim Onisiwo (free agent)
14	MF	DEN	Maurits Kjærgaard (to (France) Lille)
15	MF	MLI	Mamady Diambou (to (France) Brest)
16	MF	JPN	Takumu Kawamura (to (Japan) Sanfrecce Hiroshima)
18	MF	DEN	Mads Bidstrup (to (France) Lyon)
23	DF	FRA	Joane Gadou (to (Germany) Borussia Dortmund)
25	MF	CRO	Oliver Lukić (on loan to TSV Hartberg)
27	FW	BIH	Kerim Alajbegović (to (Germany) Bayer Leverkusen)
37	DF	AUT	Tim Trummer (on loan to Grazer AK)
38	MF	AUT	Valentin Sulzbacher (to (Netherlands) Excelsior)
44	DF	AUT	Jannik Schuster (to (England) Brentford)
49	MF	MLI	Moussa Yeo (to (Wales) Swansea City)
92	GK	AUT	Salko Hamzić (to WSG Tirol)
—	FW	VEN	Yerwin Sulbarán (on loan to Liefering)
—	DF	GER	Hendry Blank (on loan to (Germany) Greuther Fürth, previously on loan at (Germany) Hannover 96)
—	DF	BRA	Douglas Mendes (to (Brazil) Vila Nova, previously on loan at Liefering)
—	MF	ENG	Bobby Clark (to (England) Derby County, previously on loan)
—	MF	AUT	Zeteny Jano (to (Germany) Jahn Regensburg, previously on loan at Grazer AK)
—	MF	FRA	Lucas Gourna-Douath (to (England) Hull City, previously on loan at (France) Le Havre)
—	FW	DEN	Adam Daghim (to (Germany) TSG Hoffenheim, previously on loan at (Germany) VfL Wolfsburg)

=== Austria Wien ===
In:

No.	Pos.	Nation	Player
3	DF	NGR	Ibrahim Buhari (from (Sweden) Elfsborg)
4	DF	GER	Jonas Feddersen (from (Germany) Borussia Dortmund II)
5	MF	AUT	Valentino Müller (free agent)
20	FW	GER	Julian Hettwer (from (Germany) Fortuna Düsseldorf)

Out:

No.	Pos.	Nation	Player
4	DF	AUT	Ziad El Sheiwi (retired)
5	MF	GAM	Abubakr Barry (to Red Bull Salzburg)
7	FW	AUT	Romeo Vučić (to Blau-Weiß Linz)
21	DF	FRA	Hakim Guenouche (free agent)
23	FW	AUT	Konstantin Aleksa (to (Germany) TSG Hoffenheim II)
24	DF	CRO	Tin Plavotić (to (Poland) Motor Lublin)
29	FW	AUT	Marko Raguž (to SCR Altach)
60	DF	AUT	Dejan Radonjić (to SV Ried)
66	DF	AUT	Ifeanyi Ndukwe (to (England) Liverpool)
—	MF	AUT	Moritz Wels (to WSG Tirol, previously on loan)

=== Rapid Wien ===
In:

No.	Pos.	Nation	Player
8	FW	DEN	Tonni Adamsen (from (Denmark) Silkeborg)
30	MF	AUT	Nicolas Bajlicz (from SV Ried)

Out:

No.	Pos.	Nation	Player
8	MF	AUT	Lukas Grgić (to (Italy) Bari)
16	MF	NOR	Tobias Børkeeiet (to (Norway) Sandefjord)
17	MF	NOR	Tobias Gulliksen (on loan to (Turkey) Kocaelispor)
26	FW	AUT	Andreas Weimann (loan return to (England) Derby County)
29	MF	CIV	Romeo Amane (to (Belgium) Anderlecht)
41	FW	AUT	Dominik Weixelbraun (on loan to Austria Lustenau)
90	FW	MTQ	Janis Antiste (loan return to (Italy) Sassuolo)
—	MF	AUT	Moritz Oswald (on loan to WSG Tirol, previously on loan at SCR Altach)
—	FW	MNE	Andrija Radulović (on loan to TSV Hartberg, previously on loan at (Israel) Hapoel Haifa)
—	DF	AUT	Benjamin Böckle (to SCR Altach, previously on loan at WSG Tirol)

=== TSV Hartberg ===
In:

No.	Pos.	Nation	Player
3	DF	AUT	Simon Freund (from SV Seekirchen)
7	FW	AUT	Angelo Gattermayer (from Wolfsberger AC)
9	FW	URU	Agustín Urrutia (from (Slovenia) Ilirija 1911)
10	MF	CRO	Oliver Lukić (on loan from Red Bull Salzburg)
12	DF	AUT	Manuel Pfeifer (from (Germany) 1860 Munich)
16	DF	AUT	Magnus Dalpiaz (on loan from (Germany) Bayern Munich II, previously on loan at (Italy) Milan Futuro)
28	MF	AUT	Florian Gerstl (from SR Donaufeld)
49	FW	MNE	Andrija Radulović (on loan from Rapid Wien, previously on loan at (Israel) Hapoel Haifa)
70	FW	GER	Chilohem Onuoha (on loan from (Portugal) Estrela da Amadora)
91	GK	HUN	Ármin Pécsi (on loan from (England) Liverpool)
—	FW	AUT	Elias Havel (from LASK, previously on loan)

Out:

No.	Pos.	Nation	Player
1	GK	AUT	Ammar Helac (to Sturm Graz)
3	DF	AUT	Dominic Vincze (loan return to Rapid Wien)
8	MF	AUT	Julian Halwachs (to Sturm Graz II)
11	MF	AUT	Maximilian Fillafer (to First Vienna)
16	DF	AUT	Julian Gölles (to TUS Bad Waltersdorf)
25	DF	AUT	Emmanuel Ojukwu (to Kapfenberger SV)
28	DF	AUT	Jürgen Heil (to Sturm Graz)
33	DF	GER	Maximilian Hennig (loan return to (Germany) Bayern Munich II)
40	GK	GER	Tom Ritzy Hülsmann (to (France) Reims)
61	FW	GHA	Musibau Aziz (loan return to (Ghana) Dreams)
95	DF	AUT	Damjan Kovačević (to (Germany) Eintracht Braunschweig)
—	FW	AUT	Elias Havel (to (Italy) Genoa)
—	FW	CRO	Patrik Mijić (to (Croatia) Gorica, previously on loan at (Greece) Kifisia)

=== SV Ried ===
In:

No.	Pos.	Nation	Player
4	MF	AUT	Lukas Malicsek (from Admira Wacker)
5	DF	AUT	Dejan Radonjić (from Austria Wien)
7	DF	AUT	Oliver Sorg (from (Germany) FC Augsburg)
9	FW	MLI	Niama Pape Sissoko (on loan from (France) Reims, previously on loan at (France) Nancy)
10	MF	IRQ	Jussef Nasrawe (from (Germany) Bayern Munich II, previously on loan)
11	MF	RSA	Jaedin Rhodes (from (South Africa) Cape Town City)
19	FW	DEN	Tobias Lund Jensen (on loan from (Belgium) Club NXT)
21	FW	CRO	Tino Kusanović (on loan from (Germany) 1. FC Nürnberg)
22	MF	AUT	Stefan Schwab (from (Germany) Holstein Kiel)
28	DF	FRO	Samuel Chukwudi (from (Finland) SJK)
29	DF	CRO	Luka Capan (from (Serbia) TSC)
92	FW	SWE	Isaac Kiese Thelin (free agent)
—	GK	BIH	Hidajet Hankić (free agent)

Out:

No.	Pos.	Nation	Player
3	DF	AUT	Jonathan Scherzer (free agent)
5	DF	JPN	Nikki Havenaar (to (Belgium) Union SG)
7	FW	ZAM	Kingstone Mutandwa (loan return to (Italy) Cagliari)
9	FW	GER	Saliou Sané (to (Switzerland) Young Fellows Juventus)
13	FW	AUT	Peter Kiedl (loan return to Sturm Graz)
14	DF	AUT	Philip Weissenbacher (on loan to Kapfenberger SV)
20	MF	AUT	Nevio Zotz (on loan to Hertha Wels)
21	MF	CMR	Loiange Ondoa (to (Kosovo) Ferizaj)
23	DF	AUT	Michael Sollbauer (to Grazer AK)
24	MF	AUT	Christopher Wernitznig (to Hertha Wels)
25	DF	AUT	Dominik Kirnbauer (to FAC)
26	MF	AUT	Jonas Mayer (on loan to Blau-Weiß Linz)
28	MF	AUT	Nicolas Bajlicz (to Rapid Wien)
29	MF	RSA	Antonio van Wyk (to (South Africa) Mamelodi Sundowns)
36	GK	AUT	Marcel Köstenbauer (to Blau-Weiß Linz)
—	GK	CZE	Matěj Čechal (loan return to Hertha Wels)

=== Wolfsberger AC ===
In:

No.	Pos.	Nation	Player
6	DF	AUT	Raffael Behounek (from (Netherlands) Willem II)
7	FW	AUT	Luca Hassler (from Kapfenberger SV)
9	FW	ALB	Giacomo Vrioni (from (Italy) Cesena)
11	DF	AUT	Aaron Sky Schwarz (from Admira Wacker)
12	GK	ISR	Lior Gliklich (from (Israel) Maccabi Bnei Reineh)
17	MF	AUT	Marco Schabauer (from Admira Wacker)
19	MF	GEO	Otar Mamageishvili (on loan from (Portugal) Famalicão)
20	MF	AUT	Thorsten Schriebl (from Grazer AK)
22	FW	SRB	Veljko Vukojević (from (Serbia) Grafičar Beograd)
23	FW	AUT	Phillip Verhounig (from Liefering)
35	DF	AUT	Matteo Kitz (from Austria Klagenfurt)
36	MF	AUT	Dominik Fitz (on loan from (United States) Minnesota United)

Out:

No.	Pos.	Nation	Player
6	MF	AUT	Florent Hajdini (to SKU Amstetten)
7	FW	AUT	Angelo Gattermayer (to TSV Hartberg)
9	FW	AUT	Erik Kojzek (on loan to (Serbia) Partizan)
11	FW	KEN	Ryan Ogam (on loan to (Belgium) RFC Liège)
12	GK	AUT	Nikolas Polster (to (Netherlands) NEC)
13	DF	AUT	Tobias Gruber (to First Vienna)
14	MF	NGR	Tochukwu Raymond (to (Croatia) BSK Bijelo Brdo)
17	FW	GHA	David Atanga (free agent)
18	MF	AUT	Alessandro Schöpf (to LASK)
20	MF	SRB	Dejan Zukić (to (Serbia) Vojvodina)
22	DF	AUT	Dominik Baumgartner (to (Poland) Cracovia)
23	MF	BIH	Emin Kujović (loan return to (Germany) 1. FC Köln)
24	FW	GER	Jessic Ngankam (loan return to (Germany) Eintracht Frankfurt)
35	DF	NGR	Emmanuel Chukwu (loan return to (Germany) TSG Hoffenheim II)
—	FW	AUT	Thierno Ballo (to (France) Saint-Étienne, previously on loan at (England) Millwall)

=== SCR Altach ===
In:

No.	Pos.	Nation	Player
4	DF	BRA	Henrique Bell (from (Brazil) São Paulo youth)
7	MF	AUT	Denizcan Cosgun (from Austria Salzburg)
9	FW	AUT	Marko Raguž (from Austria Wien)
11	FW	JPN	Shingo Nakano (from (Singapore) Jurong)
14	MF	AUT	Johannes Naschberger (free agent)
19	FW	SRB	Srđan Hrstić (from (Sweden) Häcken, previously on loan)
21	DF	AUT	Jakob Brandtner (from Liefering)
22	MF	AUT	Yanis Eisschill (from SKU Amstetten)
29	DF	GER	Niklas Niehoff (on loan from (Germany) Holstein Kiel)
37	DF	AUT	Benjamin Böckle (from Rapid Wien, previously on loan at WSG Tirol)
39	FW	GER	Rodney Elongo-Yombo (from (Germany) 1. FC Saarbrücken)

Out:

No.	Pos.	Nation	Player
5	DF	AUT	Lukas Gugganig (free agent)
7	FW	AUT	Luca Kronberger (free agent)
9	FW	AUT	Marlon Mustapha (loan return to (Italy) Como)
14	MF	AUT	Moritz Oswald (loan return to Rapid Wien)
19	MF	AUT	Diego Madritsch (to Blau-Weiß Linz)
20	MF	AUT	Alexander Gorgon (to (Poland) Świt Szczecin)
21	FW	NGR	Precious Benjamin (loan return to (Germany) TSG Hoffenheim)
22	MF	KOS	Blendi Idrizi (free agent)
25	DF	AUT	Sandro Ingolitsch (free agent)
29	DF	BFA	Mohamed Ouédraogo (to (France) Lyon)
40	FW	ALB	Anteo Fetahu (to SW Bregenz)

=== Grazer AK ===
In:

No.	Pos.	Nation	Player
6	MF	ISR	Liam Hermesh (from (Israel) Maccabi Haifa, previously on loan at (Moldova) Sheriff Tiraspol)
7	FW	NED	Anthony Smits (from (Netherlands) Jong AZ)
17	MF	AUT	Souleyman Mandey (from (England) West Bromwich Albion)
21	DF	AUT	Michael Sollbauer (from SV Ried)
23	GK	AUT	Cican Stanković (free agent)
24	MF	AUT	Christopher Cvetko (free agent)
28	DF	BRA	Anderson (from Blau-Weiß Linz)
29	MF	MAR	Ismaël Guerti (from (France) Metz)
32	DF	RUS	Leon Klassen (from (Germany) Darmstadt 98, previously on loan)
34	MF	AUT	Peter Michorl (from (Greece) Atromitos)
37	DF	AUT	Tim Trummer (on loan from Red Bull Salzburg)
48	DF	AUT	Matthias Gragger (from SKU Amstetten)
72	DF	AUT	Petar Marković (from (Italy) Bologna Primavera)
82	DF	FRA	Beres Owusu (from (France) Saint-Étienne, previously on loan)

Out:

No.	Pos.	Nation	Player
4	DF	AUT	Martin Kreuzriegler (to SV Ried II)
6	MF	LUX	Mathias Olesen (loan return to (Germany) Greuther Fürth)
7	MF	AUT	Murat Satin (to WSG Tirol)
12	GK	AUT	Franz Stolz (loan return to (Italy) Genoa)
15	DF	AUT	Lukas Graf (to SV Gloggnitz)
17	MF	AUT	Thomas Schiestl (to Blau-Weiß Linz)
18	MF	AUT	Zeteny Jano (loan return to Red Bull Salzburg)
20	MF	AUT	Thorsten Schriebl (to Wolfsberger AC)
21	FW	KOS	Arbnor Prenqi (free agent)
22	FW	FRA	Ramiz Harakaté (to LASK)
24	MF	AUT	Tim Paumgartner (to SV Grödig)
28	MF	AUT	Dominik Frieser (to Blau-Weiß Linz)
31	GK	ROU	Darius Achiței (to Rapid Wien II)
98	GK	AUT	Fabian Ehmann (free agent)
—	GK	AUT	Juri Kirchmayr (on loan to Wacker Innsbruck, previously on loan at FAC)

=== WSG Tirol ===
In:

No.	Pos.	Nation	Player
1	GK	AUT	Salko Hamzić (from Red Bull Salzburg)
5	DF	USA	Drew Murray (from (Germany) SC Freiburg II, previously on loan at (Germany) Rot-Weiß Oberhausen)
6	MF	AUT	Marc Striednig (from Liefering)
11	MF	AUT	Murat Satin (from Grazer AK)
17	FW	ENG	Michael Olakigbe (on loan from (England) Brentford, previously on loan at (England) Swindon Town)
18	MF	AUT	Husein Balić (free agent)
28	MF	AUT	Moritz Oswald (on loan from Rapid Wien, previously on loan at SCR Altach)
35	GK	AUT	Julian Margreiter (from AKA Tirol)
36	FW	AUT	Thomas Goiginger (from Blau-Weiß Linz)
37	MF	AUT	Moritz Wels (from Austria Wien, previously on loan)
43	MF	AUT	Nemanja Čelić (from SKN St. Pölten)

Out:

No.	Pos.	Nation	Player
1	GK	AUT	Paul Schermer (to Kufstein)
4	MF	AUT	Valentino Müller (free agent)
5	DF	GER	Jamie Lawrence (to (Belgium) OH Leuven)
6	DF	AUT	Lukas Sulzbacher (free agent)
9	FW	NGR	Ademola Ola-Adebomi (to (Belgium) Lokeren)
11	FW	AUT	Tobias Anselm (to First Vienna)
17	MF	AUT	Johannes Naschberger (free agent)
18	DF	AUT	Lukas Schweighofer (on loan to Austria Salzburg)
19	MF	AUT	Christian Huetz (on loan to Austria Salzburg)
20	DF	AUT	Benjamin Böckle (loan return to Rapid Wien)
21	FW	AUT	Yannick Vötter (to SKU Amstetten)
28	DF	AUT	Thomas Geris (to FAC)
40	GK	CZE	Adam Stejskal (free agent)

=== Austria Lustenau ===
In:

No.	Pos.	Nation	Player
3	DF	BRA	Danilo Soares (from (Germany) 1. FC Nürnberg)
8	MF	SUI	Dion Kacuri (on loan from (Switzerland) Basel)
10	FW	GAM	Alieu Conateh (on loan from (Switzerland) Grasshoppers, previously on loan at SKU Amstetten)
11	FW	AUT	Dominik Weixelbraun (on loan from Rapid Wien)
12	DF	AUT	Novak Rajić (from AKA Vorarlberg)
14	FW	NGR	Precious Benjamin (on loan from (Germany) TSG Hoffenheim, previously on loan at SCR Altach)
15	DF	NGR	Emmanuel Chukwu (on loan from (Germany) TSG Hoffenheim II, previously on loan at Wolfsberger AC)
17	FW	AUT	Albin Gashi (from Hertha Wels)
20	MF	GHA	Lord Afrifa (from Sturm Graz II)
21	DF	BRA	Anílson (from (Portugal) Paços de Ferreira)
29	DF	AUT	Niklas Pertlwieser (from SKU Amstetten)
39	FW	CRO	Antonio Verinac (on loan from (Switzerland) St. Gallen)

Out:

No.	Pos.	Nation	Player
3	DF	BRA	Willian Rodrigues (to SW Bregenz)
5	DF	LIE	Felix Oberwaditzer (to Lauterach)
6	MF	SEN	Mame Wade (to (Belgium) RAAL La Louvière)
8	MF	GER	Nico Gorzel (free agent)
10	FW	CIV	Ibrahim Ouattara (free agent)
12	FW	AUT	Mario Vucenovic (to FAC)
17	FW	AUT	Daniel Au Yeong (to SW Bregenz)
21	DF	FRA	Axel Rouquette (to (France) Créteil)
22	MF	FRA	Mohamed-Amine Bouchenna (loan return to (France) Clermont)
35	FW	POR	Asumah Abubakar (to (Azerbaijan) Kapaz)
44	GK	GER	Hugo Bauer (free agent)
99	FW	ZAM	Jack Lahne (free agent)
—	MF	TUR	Enes Koç (to (Turkey) Bodrum, previously on loan at Dornbirn)

== See also ==
- 2026–27 Austrian Football Bundesliga
