= 2026–27 Grazer AK season =

Grazer AK
2026–27 season
- Manager: Ferdinand Feldhofer (until 17 August); Joachim Standfest (Interim from 17 August until 24 August); Gerald Scheiblehner (from 24 August)
- Stadium: Liebenauer Stadium
- Austrian Football Bundesliga: 8th
- Austrian Cup: Third round
- Top goalscorer: League: Alexander Hofleitner (4); All: Alexander Hofleitner (6)
- Highest home attendance: 7,752 (vs. Red Bull Salzburg, 10 October 2026)
- Lowest home attendance: 3,533 (vs. SCR Altach, 27 October 2026)
- Average home league attendance: 6,672
- Biggest win: 4–0 (vs. SR Donaufeld, 25 July 2026)
- Biggest defeat: 8–0 (vs. Rapid Wien, 16 August 2026)
- All statistics correct as of 30 October 2026.

The 2026–27 season is the 125th season in the history of Grazer AK, and the club's third consecutive season in the Austrian Football Bundesliga. In addition to the domestic league, the team is scheduled to participate in the Austrian Cup.

== Transfers ==
=== In ===
Pos.	Player	Transferred from	Fee	Date	Source
DF	(France) Beres Owusu	(France) Saint-Étienne	€250k	21 May 2026	
MF	(Austria) Peter Michorl	(Greece) Atromitos	Free	27 May 2026	
DF	(Austria) Matthias Gragger	(Austria) Amstetten	Free	2 June 2026	
DF	(Brazil) Anderson	(Austria) Blau-Weiß Linz	Free	16 June 2026	
MF	(Morocco) Ismaël Guerti	(France) Metz	Undisclosed	17 June 2026	
FW	(Netherlands) Anthony Smits	(Netherlands) AZ Alkmaar	Free	18 June 2026	
DF	(Austria) Tim Trummer	(Austria) Red Bull Salzburg	Loan	18 June 2026	
GK	(Austria) Cican Stanković		Free	7 July 2026	
DF	(Russia) Leon Klassen	(Germany) Darmstadt 98	€100k	9 July 2026	
DF	(Austria) Petar Marković	(Italy) Bologna	Undisclosed	9 July 2026	
MF	(Israel) Liam Hermesh	(Israel) Maccabi Haifa	Free	20 July 2026	
MF	(Austria) Souleyman Mandey	(England) West Bromwich Albion	Undisclosed	6 August 2026	
DF	(Austria) Michael Sollbauer	(Austria) SV Ried	Free	2 September 2026	
MF	(Austria) Christopher Cvetko		Free	4 September 2026	

=== Out ===
Pos.	Player	Transferred to	Fee	Date	Source
MF	(Austria) Thorsten Schriebl	(Austria) Wolfsberger AC	Free	29 May 2026	
FW	(France) Ramiz Harakaté	(Austria) LASK	€1.5m	17 June 2026	
MF	(Austria) Dominik Frieser	(Austria) Blau-Weiß Linz	Free	19 June 2026	
DF	(Georgia (country)) Mukhran Bagrationi	(Austria) Kapfenberger SV	Free	19 June 2026	
DF	(Austria) Lukas Graf	(Austria) SV Gloggnitz	Free	24 June 2026	
GK	(Romania) Darius Achitei	(Austria) SK Rapid Wien II	Free	24 June 2026	
MF	(Austria) Thomas Schiestl	(Austria) Blau-Weiß Linz	Free	26 June 2026	
GK	(Austria) Fabian Ehmann		Released	1 July 2026	
FW	(Kosovo) Arbnor Prenqi		Released	1 July 2026	
MF	(Austria) Murat Satin	(Austria) WSG Tirol	Free	3 July 2026	
GK	(Austria) Juri Kirchmayr	(Austria) Wacker Innsbruck	Loan	17 July 2026	
DF	(Austria) Martin Kreuzriegler	(Austria) SV Ried II	Free	30 July 2026	
MF	(Austria) Tim Paumgartner	(Austria) SV Grödig	Free	4 August 2026	

== Friendlies ==
19 June 2026 Friendly	Győr (Hungary)	2–2	(Austria) Grazer AK	Győr
16:30	Umathum 45+1'; Madoulin 67'	Report	Michorl 17'; Große 71'	Stadium: ETO Park

24 June 2026 Friendly	Grazer AK (Austria)	0–1	(Slovakia) Slovan Bratislava	Graz
16:00		Report	Janković 31'	Stadium: Merkur-Arena

7 July 2026 Friendly	Grazer AK (Austria)	2–4	(Austria) First Vienna	Graz
17:30	Maderner 42'; Anderson 52'	Report	Anselm 1'; Zimmermann 57'; Birkhahn 72', 79'	Stadium: Merkur-Arena

11 July 2026 Friendly	Grazer AK (Austria)	1–0	(Austria) Kapfenberger SV	Graz
16:00	Gragger 66'	Report	(penalty missed) 25'	Stadium: Merkur-Arena

14 July 2026 Friendly	Grazer AK (Austria)	Cancelled	(Hungary) Paks	Graz
15:30				Stadium: Merkur-Arena

18 July 2026 Friendly	Grazer AK (Austria)	0–5	(Germany) SG Dynamo Dresden	Graz
15:00		Report	Sterner 27'; Remus 60'; Hauptmann 95'; Wagner 109'; Rossipal 119'	Stadium: Merkur-Arena
Note: Game played over 120 minutes

== Competitions ==
=== Overall record ===
Competition	First match	Last match	Starting round	Final position	Record							
Competition	First match	Last match	Starting round	Final position	Pld	W	D	L	GF	GA	GD	Win %
Austrian Football Bundesliga	31 July 2026		Matchday 1		11	2	4	5	8	27	−19	18.18
Austrian Cup	25 July 2026	27 October 2026	First round	Third round	3	2	0	1	6	4	+2	66.67
Total					14	4	4	6	14	31	−17	28.57

Last updated: 30 October 2026
Source: Soccerway

=== Austrian Football Bundesliga ===
==== League table ====
Pos	Team	Pld	W	D	L	GF	GA	GD	Pts	Qualification
7	WSG Tirol	12	3	4	5	15	18	−3	13	Qualification for the Relegation round
8	Austria Lustenau	12	3	2	7	15	30	−15	11	Qualification for the Relegation round
9	Grazer AK	12	2	4	6	9	29	−20	10	Qualification for the Relegation round
10	SCR Altach	12	3	1	8	11	20	−9	10	Qualification for the Relegation round
11	Austria Wien	12	2	2	8	11	23	−12	8	Qualification for the Relegation round

Updated to match(es) played on 8 November 2026. Source: Austrian Football Bundesliga
Rules for classification: 1) Points; 2) Head-to-head record; 3) Goal difference; 4) Goals scored; 5) Matches won; 6) Away matches won; 7) Away goals scored.

==== Results summary ====
Overall								Home						Away					
Pld	W	D	L	GF	GA	GD	Pts	W	D	L	GF	GA	GD	W	D	L	GF	GA	GD
11	2	4	5	8	27	−19	10	1	3	1	4	7	−3	1	1	4	4	20	−16

Last updated: 30 October 2026.
Source: ADMIRAL Bundesliga

==== Results by round ====
Round	1	2	3	4	5	6	7	8	9	10	11
Ground	A	H	A	A	H	A	H	H	A	A	H
Result	L	W	L	L	D	W	D	D	L	D	L
Position	12	7	9	10	10	7	8	7	8	8	8

Updated to match(es) played on 30 October 2026. Source: ADMIRAL Bundesliga
A = Away; H = Home; W = Win; D = Draw; L = Loss

==== Matches ====
31 July 2026 1	LASK	3–0	Grazer AK	Linz
19:30	Adeniran 20', 29' (pen.); Lang 79'	Report	Pines (yellow card) 28'; Klassen (yellow card) 72'	Stadium: Raiffeisen Arena; Attendance: 13,276; Referee: Sebastian Gishamer

8 August 2026 2	Grazer AK	2–1	Austria Lustenau	Graz
17:00	Pines 18'; Michorl (yellow card) 21'; Hofleitner 68'	Report	Kacuri 51'; Verinac (yellow card) 88'; Chukwu (yellow card) 90+2'	Stadium: Merkur-Arena; Attendance: 6,767; Referee: Safak Barmaksiz

16 August 2026 3	Rapid Wien	8–0	Grazer AK	Vienna
19:00	Kara 5', 13'; Adamsen 14', 45+3', 74', 86'; Cvetković 42'; Demir 56'	Report	Koch (yellow card) 22'; Hofleitner (yellow card) 41'; Klassen (yellow card) 45+1'; Pines (yellow card) 58'	Stadium: Allianz Stadion; Attendance: 17,651; Referee: Arnes Talic

21 August 2026 4	SV Ried	1–0	Grazer AK	Ried im Innkreis
19:30	Chukwudi (yellow card) 5'; Sissoko 45+1' (pen.), (yellow card) 45+2'; Kusanovic (yellow card) 90+2'	Report	Oberleitner (yellow card) 33'; Anderson (yellow card) 39'; Michorl (yellow card) 45+2'; Owusu (yellow card) 57'	Stadium: BWT X Upper Austrian Arena; Attendance: 4,215; Referee: Daniel Pfister

29 August 2026 5	Grazer AK	0–0	Wolfsberger AC	Graz
17:00	Michorl (yellow card) 27'; Pines (yellow card) 48'; Maderner (yellow card) 61'	Report	Wimmer (red card) 15'; Behounek (yellow card) 27'; Sulzner (yellow card) 61'; Wohlmuth (yellow card) 74'	Stadium: Merkur-Arena; Attendance: 6,744; Referee: Markus Greinecker

12 September 2026 6	SCR Altach	1–2	Grazer AK	Altach
17:00	Massombo 25'; Jäger (yellow card) 74'	Report	Oberleitner 6'; Hofleitner 38', (yellow card) 90'	Stadium: Stadion Schnabelholz; Attendance: 4,152; Referee: Josef Spurny

19 September 2026 7	Grazer AK	2–2	Austria Wien	Graz
19:30	Hofleitner 15', (yellow card) 49'; Italiano 55'; Klassen (yellow card) 58'; Oberleitner (yellow card) 64'; Michorl (yellow card) 81'; Sollbauer (yellow card) 90+3'	Report	Ranftl (yellow card) 16'; Fischer 45'; Handl (yellow card) 72'; K. Lee 81'; Wustinger (yellow card) 87'	Stadium: Merkur-Arena; Attendance: 5,530; Referee: Arnes Talic

10 October 2026 8	Grazer AK	0–0	Red Bull Salzburg	Graz
17:00	Italiano (yellow card) 89'	Report	Barry (yellow card) 55'; Drexler (yellow card) 64'	Stadium: Merkur-Arena; Attendance: 7,752; Referee: Stefan Ebner

18 October 2026 9	Sturm Graz	6–1	Grazer AK	Graz
17:00	Weinhandl 38'; Heil 39'; Diakité 41', 49', 51', (yellow card) 52'; Gorenc Stanković 75'; Halwachs (yellow card) 82'	Report	Cvetko 11'; Große (yellow card) 48'; Hofleitner (yellow card) 53'	Stadium: Merkur-Arena; Attendance: 15,391; Referee: Julian Weinberger

24 October 2026 10	WSG Tirol	1–1	Grazer AK	Innsbruck
17:00	Baden 63'	Report	Hofleitner 8' (pen.); Trummer (yellow card) 45+4'; Klassen (yellow card) 68'	Stadium: Tivoli Stadion Tirol; Attendance: 1,131; Referee: Stefan Macanovic

30 October 2026 11	Grazer AK	0–4	TSV Hartberg	Graz
19:30	Hofleitner (yellow card) 27'; Cvetko (yellow card) 47'; Michorl (yellow card) 57'	Report	Hoffmann 12', 26'; Diarra (yellow card) 55'; Feldhofer (yellow card) 63', (goal) 63'; Pines 66' (o.g.)	Stadium: Merkur-Arena; Attendance: 6,567; Referee: Isa Simsek

=== Austrian Cup ===
25 July 2026 First round	SR Donaufeld	0–4	Grazer AK	Wien
17:00	Petković (yellow card) 66'; Ivkić (yellow card) 77'	Report	Trummer 43'; Oberleitner (yellow card) 45+2'; Hofleitner 49'; Gragger (yellow card) 77'; Klassen 82'; Michorl 90'	Stadium: Sportplatz Donaufeld; Attendance: 1,500; Referee: Stefan Macanovic

6 September 2026 Second round	FC Kitzbühel	0–2	Grazer AK	Kitzbühel
16:00	Markelić (yellow card) 50'; Madersbacher (yellow card) 73'	Report	Hofleitner 3'; Oberleitner 77'	Stadium: Sportzstadion Kitzbühel; Attendance: 800; Referee: Stjepan Bosnjak

27 October 2026 Third round	Grazer AK	0–4	SCR Altach	Graz
19:00		Report	Massombo 18', 51'; Elongo-Yombo 58'; Hrstić 69' (pen.)	Stadium: Merkur-Arena; Attendance: 3,533; Referee: Florian Jäger

== Statistics ==
=== Appearances and goals ===
As of match played 30 October 2026

Players with no appearances are not included on the list
Italics indicate a loaned in player

No.	Pos	Nat	Player	Total		Bundesliga		Austrian Cup	
No.	Pos	Nat	Player	Apps	Goals	Apps	Goals	Apps	Goals
2	DF	(United States) USA	Donovan Pines	7	1	5+1	1	1+0	0
3	DF	(Denmark) DEN	Ludwig Vraa	5	0	3+1	0	1+0	0
6	MF	(Israel) ISR	Liam Hermesh	7	0	4+0	0	1+2	0
7	FW	(Netherlands) NED	Anthony Smits	7	0	1+4	0	0+2	0
8	MF	(Austria) AUT	Tobias Koch	7	0	3+3	0	1+0	0
9	FW	(Austria) AUT	Daniel Maderner	11	0	3+5	0	2+1	0
10	MF	(Austria) AUT	Christian Lichtenberger	12	0	8+2	0	2+0	0
11	MF	(Austria) AUT	Mark Große	12	0	4+5	0	1+2	0
14	DF	(Australia) AUS	Jacob Italiano	6	1	4+1	1	0+1	0
17	MF	(Austria) AUT	Souleyman Mandey	6	0	0+5	0	0+1	0
21	DF	(Austria) AUT	Michael Sollbauer	8	0	6+0	0	2+0	0
23	GK	(Austria) AUT	Cican Stanković	14	0	11+0	0	3+0	0
24	MF	(Austria) AUT	Christopher Cvetko	8	1	6+0	1	1+1	0
25	FW	(Austria) AUT	Alexander Hofleitner	14	6	11+0	4	3+0	2
27	DF	(Germany) GER	Yannick Oberleitner	11	2	9+0	1	2+0	1
28	DF	(Brazil) BRA	Anderson	11	0	8+1	0	1+1	0
29	MF	(Morocco) MAR	Ismaël Guerti	5	0	2+1	0	1+1	0
32	DF	(Russia) RUS	Leon Klassen	13	1	9+1	0	3+0	1
34	MF	(Austria) AUT	Peter Michorl	14	1	11+0	0	3+0	1
37	DF	(Austria) AUT	Tim Trummer	6	1	1+3	0	2+0	1
48	DF	(Austria) AUT	Matthias Gragger	8	0	2+4	0	1+1	0
72	DF	(Austria) AUT	Petar Marković	8	0	1+5	0	0+2	0
82	DF	(France) FRA	Beres Owusu	11	0	9+0	0	2+0	0
