= 2025–26 Grazer AK season =

Grazer AK
2025–26 season
- Manager: Ferdinand Feldhofer
- Stadium: Liebenauer Stadium
- Austrian Football Bundesliga: 8th
- Austrian Cup: First round
- Top goalscorer: League: Ramiz Harakaté (10); All: Ramiz Harakaté (10)
- Highest home attendance: 16,093 30 August 2025 vs. SK Sturm Graz
- Lowest home attendance: 6,694 4 October vs. Wolfsberger AC
- Average home league attendance: 8,690
- Biggest win: Grazer AK 3–1 SC Rheindorf Altach (1 November 2025); Grazer AK 3–1 Blau-Weiß Linz (29 November 2025)
- Biggest defeat: FC Red Bull Salzburg 5–0 Grazer AK (9 August 2025)
- All statistics correct as of 10 December 2025.

The 2025–26 season is the 124th season in the history of Grazer AK, and the club's second consecutive season in the Austrian Football Bundesliga. In addition to the domestic league, the team is scheduled to participate in the Austrian Cup.

== Transfers ==
=== In ===
Pos.	Player	Transferred from	Fee	Date	Source
MF	(Austria) Tobias Koch	SK Austria Klagenfurt	Free	17 June 2025	
FW	(Kosovo) Arbnor Prenqi	(Austria) SC Neusiedl/See	Undisclosed	18 June 2025	
FW	(France) Ramiz Harakaté	(Austria) SKN St. Pölten	Undisclosed	19 June 2025	
MF	(Austria) Tim Paumgartner	(Austria) FC Liefering	Undisclosed	21 June 2025	
DF	(Denmark) Ludwig Vraa	(Denmark) Brøndby IF	Free	3 July 2025	
FW	(Austria) Alexander Hofleitner	(Austria) SV Kapfenberg	Undisclosed	10 July 2025	
DF	(United States) Donovan Pines	(England) Barnsley	Free	4 August 2025	
DF	(France) Beres Owusu	(France) Saint-Étienne	Loan	6 August 2025	
GK	(Austria) Fabian Ehmann	(Austria) ASK Voitsberg	Free	28 August 2025	
GK	(Austria) Franz Stolz	(Italy) Genoa	Loan	8 January 2026	
MF	(Austria) Mark Große	(Austria) SV Ried	Undisclosed	14 January 2026	
DF	(Russia) Leon Klassen	(Germany) Darmstadt 98	Loan	21 January 2026	
MF	(Luxembourg) Mathias Olesen	(Germany) Greuther Fürth	Loan	2 February 2026	

=== Out ===
Pos.	Player	Transferred to	Fee	Date	Source
FW	(Cameroon) Kevin-Prince Milla	(Czech Republic) Dukla Prague	€100,000	1 May 2025	
MF	(Hungary) Laszlo Kleinheisler		Released	15 June 2025	
DF	(Austria) Moritz Eder	SV Austria Salzburg	Undisclosed	26 June 2025	
FW	(Japan) Atsushi Zaizen	(Austria) SW Bregenz	Free	1 July 2025	
FW	(Austria) Max Rauter	(Austria) Deutschlandsberger SC	Undisclosed	1 July 2025	
MF	(Austria) Martin Murg	(Austria) SC Weiz	Undisclosed	1 July 2025	
DF	(Austria) Sebastian Jost	(Austria) SC Weiz	Undisclosed	1 July 2025	
DF	(Austria) Benjamin Rosenberger	(Austria) First Vienna FC	Free	10 July 2025	
GK	(Austria) Juri Kirchmayr	(Austria) Floridsdorfer AC	Loan	24 July 2025	
MF	(Austria) Marco Gantschnig	SK Austria Klagenfurt	Loan	29 July 2025	
DF	(Austria) Michael Lang	SK Austria Klagenfurt	Undisclosed	7 August 2025	
DF	(Austria) Miloš Jovičić	(Poland) Miedź Legnica	Free	1 September 2025	
GK	(Bosnia and Herzegovina) Haris Mujanić	(Slovenia) FC Koper	Free	18 September 2025	
MF	(Togo) Sadik Fofana	(Italy) Lecce	€600,000	10 January 2026	
MF	(Austria) Marco Gantschnig	(Austria) First Vienna	Undisclosed	13 January 2026	
DF	(Germany) Petar Filipovic		Released	27 January 2026	

== Friendlies ==
=== Pre-season ===
21 June 2025 Friendly	Ilzer SV (Austria)	0–2	(Austria) Grazer AK
16:00		Report	Maderner 13'; Lichtenberger 45+4'

26 June 2025 Friendly	Grazer AK (Austria)	2–2	(Romania) CFR Cluj
16:00	Jano 22'; Satin 50'	Report	Sfait 12'; Deac 52' (pen.)

1 July 2025 Friendly	Grazer AK (Austria)	1–2	(Serbia) Vojvodina
17:00	Harakaté 90+3'	Report	Mustapha 14'; Nikolić 69'

4 July 2025 Friendly	Grazer AK (Austria)	3–0	(Austria) SV Tilmitsch
16:00	Oberleitner 50'; Lichtenberger 82'; Jano 85'	Report

12 July 2025 Friendly	Grazer AK (Austria)	1–1	(Austria) ASK Voitsberg
16:45

12 July 2025 Friendly	SV Lebring (Austria)	0–0	(Austria) Grazer AK
17:50

15 July 2025 Friendly	Grazer AK (Austria)	3–1	(Slovakia) Žilina
16:00	Maderner 23'; Satin 76'; Hofleitner 85'	Report	Faško 36'

19 July 2025 Friendly	Grazer AK (Austria)	2–0	(Austria) Kapfenberger SV
16:00	Harakaté 51'; Schiestl 90+2'	Report

29 July 2025 Friendly	Grazer AK (Austria)	0–1	(Austria) Floridsdorfer AC
13:30		Report	Lerchbacher 25'

=== Mid-season ===
4 September 2025 Friendly	Grazer AK (Austria)	3–0	SK Austria Klagenfurt
09:00	Prenqi 49'; Satin 74'; Graf 76'	Report

14 November 2025 Friendly	NK Aluminij (Slovenia)	0–0	(Austria) Grazer AK
11:00		Report	Fofana (red card) 69'

13 January 2026 Friendly	Grazer AK (Austria)	1–1	(Slovakia) KFC Komárno
13:00	Satin 20'	Report	Mashike 45' (pen.)

16 January 2026 Friendly	Grazer AK (Austria)	3–0	(Austria) Admira Wacker
12:00	Koch (yellow card) 60'; Frieser 66'; Harakaté 87'; Hofleitner 89'	Report

21 January 2026 Friendly	NK Radomlje (Slovenia)	1–1	(Austria) Grazer AK
13:00	Žaper 29'	Report	Hofleitner 65'

24 January 2026 Friendly	Grazer AK (Austria)	5–1	(Austria) ASK Voitsberg
10:00	Schriebl 8', 47'; Paumgartner 9'; Hofleitner 50'; Pines 89'	Report	Scheucher 4'

31 January 2026 Friendly	Austria Wien	2–0	(Austria) Grazer AK
12:00	Fischer 36'; Eggestein 39'	Report

== Competitions ==
=== Overall record ===
Competition	First match	Last match	Starting round	Record							
Competition	First match	Last match	Starting round	Pld	W	D	L	GF	GA	GD	Win %
Austrian Football Bundesliga	3 August 2025		Matchday 1	32	9	10	13	42	45	−3	28.13
Austrian Cup	25 July 2025	25 July 2025	First round	1	0	0	1	0	1	−1	0.00
Total				33	9	10	14	42	46	−4	27.27

Last updated: 16 May 2026
Source: Soccerway

=== Austrian Football Bundesliga ===
==== League table ====
Pos	Team	Pld	W	D	L	GF	GA	GD	Pts	Qualification
8	SCR Altach	22	7	8	7	22	23	−1	29	Qualification for the Relegation round
9	SV Ried	22	8	4	10	26	30	−4	28	Qualification for the Relegation round
10	Wolfsberger	22	7	5	10	31	32	−1	26	Qualification for the Relegation round
11	Grazer AK	22	4	8	10	22	36	−14	20	Qualification for the Relegation round
12	Blau-Weiß Linz	22	4	3	15	20	36	−16	15	Qualification for the Relegation round

Source: Austrian Football Bundesliga
Rules for classification: 1) Points; 2) Head-to-head record; 3) Goal difference; 4) Goals scored; 5) Matches won; 6) Away matches won; 7) Away goals scored.

==== Results summary ====
Overall								Home						Away					
Pld	W	D	L	GF	GA	GD	Pts	W	D	L	GF	GA	GD	W	D	L	GF	GA	GD
32	9	10	13	42	45	−3	37	6	7	3	26	20	+6	3	3	10	16	25	−9

Last updated: 16 May 2026.
Source: ADMIRAL Bundesliga

==== Results by round ====
Round	1	2	3	4	5	6	7	8	9	10	11	12	13	14	15	16	17	18	19	20	21	22
Ground	H	A	H	A	H	A	H	A	H	H	A	H	A	A	H	A	H	A	H	A	H	A
Result	D	L	D	D	L	L	D	D	L	D	L	W	L	W	W	L	L	D	D	L	W	L
Position	7	9	9	9	11	12	12	12	12	12	12	12	12	11	11	11	11	11	11	11	11	11

Updated to match(es) played on 16 May 2026. Source: ADMIRAL Bundesliga
A = Away; H = Home; W = Win; D = Draw; L = Loss

==== Matches ====
3 August 2025 1	Grazer AK	2–2	Austria Wien	Graz
17:00	Harakaté 22'; Cipot 55'	Report	Sarkaria 43'; Fitz 87'	Stadium: Merkur-Arena; Attendance: 9,464; Referee: Stefan Ebner

9 August 2025 2	Red Bull Salzburg	5–0	Grazer AK	Wals-Siezenheim
19:30	Alajbegović 45+6'; Daghim (yellow card) 45+7'; Kjærgaard 56'; Vertessen 76', 83'; Ratkov 81' (pen.)	Report	Fofana (red card) 25'; Hofleitner (yellow card) 46'	Stadium: Red Bull Arena; Attendance: 10,436; Referee: Daniel Pfister

16 August 2025 3	Grazer AK	1–1	WSG Tirol	Graz
17:00	Jano (yellow card) 22'; Owusu 60'	Report	Gugganig (yellow card) 6'; Stejskal (yellow card) 12'; Butler (yellow card) 38'; Owusu 40' (o.g.); Wels (yellow card) 73'	Stadium: Merkur-Arena; Attendance: 7,133; Referee: Harald Lechner

24 August 2025 4	SCR Altach	1–1	Grazer AK	Altach
17:00	Greil 11'; Stojanović (yellow card) 66'	Report	Harakaté (yellow card) 9'; Maderner 17'; Satin (yellow card) 61'	Stadium: Stadion Schnabelholz; Attendance: 6,572; Referee: Walter Altmann

30 August 2025 5	Grazer AK	0–3	Sturm Graz	Graz
19:30	Graf (yellow card) 20'; Koch (red card) 82'	Report	Karić (yellow card) 30'; Jatta 41', 90+6', (yellow card) 66'; Horvat 65'; Hödl (yellow card) 76'; Chukwuani (yellow card) 87'	Stadium: Merkur-Arena; Attendance: 16,093; Referee: Christian-Petru Ciochirca

13 September 2025 6	Blau-Weiß Linz	3–0	Grazer AK	Linz
17:00	Briedl (yellow card) 8'; Weissman 24', 48'; Goiginger 31', (yellow card) 66'; Maranda (yellow card) 44'; Husković (yellow card) 86'	Report	Schriebl (yellow card) 66'; Satin (yellow card) 76'	Stadium: Hofmann Personal Stadion; Attendance: 5,312; Referee: Safak Barmaksiz

21 September 2025 7	Grazer AK	1–1	Rapid Wien	Graz
17:00	Cipot (yellow card) 2'; Koch (yellow card) 45+2'; Maderner (yellow card) 90+3', (goal) 90+4' (pen.)	Report	Antiste 23', (yellow card) 90+3'; Seidl (yellow card) 88'; Tilio (yellow card) 90+2'	Stadium: Merkur-Arena; Attendance: 9,192; Referee: Harald Lechner

27 September 2025 8	SV Ried	0–0	Grazer AK	Ried im Innkreis
17:00	Grosse (yellow card) 56'	Report	Maderner (yellow card) 56'; Owusu (yellow card) 63'	Stadium: BWT Oberösterreichische Arena; Referee: Sebastian Gishamer

4 October 2025 9	Grazer AK	1–3	Wolfsberger AC	Graz
17:00	Maderner 43'; Hofleitner (yellow card) 45'; Cipot (yellow card) 87'	Report	Pink 19'; Schöpf 62', (yellow card) 68'; Nwaiwu (yellow card) 80'; Polster (yellow card) 85'; Avdijaj 90'	Stadium: Merkur-Arena; Attendance: 6,694; Referee: Alain Sadikovski

18 October 2025 10	Grazer AK	0–0	TSV Hartberg	Graz
17:00	Harakaté (yellow card) 11'; Oberleitner (yellow card) 30'	Report	Fillafer (yellow card) 4'; Kainz (yellow card) 72'	Stadium: Merkur-Arena; Attendance: 7,043; Referee: Arnes Talic

25 October 2025 11	LASK	1–0	Grazer AK	Linz
17:00	Horvath 71'	Report	Koch (yellow card) 45+2'; Frieser (yellow card) 54'	Stadium: Raiffeisen Arena; Attendance: 10,781; Referee: Sebastian Gishamer

1 November 2025 12	Grazer AK	3–1	SCR Altach	Graz
17:00	Hofleitner 38'; Satin (yellow card) 41'; Hrstić 50' (o.g.); Koch (yellow card) 88'; Harakaté 90+5'	Report	Ouédraogo (yellow card) 18'; Greil 42'; Stojanović (yellow card) 86'; Lukačević (yellow card) 88'	Stadium: Merkur-Arena; Attendance: 6,791; Referee: Daniel Pfister

8 November 2025 13	Austria Wien	2–1	Grazer AK	Vienna
17:00	Dragović (yellow card) 7'; Plavotić 24'; Wiesinger (yellow card) 67'; Radonjić (yellow card) 75'; Raguž 90+1'	Report	Maderner 53', (yellow card) 67'; Jano (yellow card) 58'; Schriebl (yellow card) 86'; Harakaté (yellow card) 90+4'	Stadium: Generali Arena; Attendance: 12,307; Referee: Harald Lechner

23 November 2025 14	Rapid Wien	1–2	Grazer AK	Vienna
17:00	Grgić (yellow card) 18'; Kara 74'; Horn (yellow card) 90+6'	Report	Pines (yellow card) 24'; Schriebl (yellow card) 53'; Maderner 67' (pen.); Owusu (yellow card) 76'; Harakaté 84'	Stadium: Allianz Stadion; Attendance: 19,124; Referee: Stefan Ebner

29 November 2025 15	Grazer AK	3–1	Blau-Weiß Linz	Graz
17:00	Satin 4', (yellow card) 45'; Kreuzriegler (yellow card) 31'; Harakaté (yellow card) 60', (goal) 75'; Hofleitner 90+3' (pen.)	Report	Reiter (yellow card) 11'; Moormann (yellow card) 44', (goal) 88'; Maranda (yellow card) 90+2'	Stadium: Merkur-Arena; Attendance: 7,112; Referee: Markus Hameter

7 December 2025 16	Sturm Graz	2–1	Grazer AK	Graz
17:00	Mitchell 7'; Malone 67', (yellow card) 85'; Chukwuani (yellow card) 90+7'	Report	Koch (yellow card) 75'; Lichtenberger 90+10'	Stadium: Merkur-Arena; Attendance: 15,923; Referee: Julian Weinberger

13 December 2025 17	Grazer AK	1–2	LASK	Graz
17:00	Pines 18'; Owusu (yellow card) 39'	Report	Usor 4'; Adeniran 25'	Stadium: Merkur-Arena; Attendance: 7,071; Referee: Walter Altmann

8 February 2026 18	Wolfsberger AC	2–2	Grazer AK	Wolfsberg
14:30	Sulzner (red card) 11'; Polster (yellow card) 16'; Atanga 39'; Renner (yellow card) 70'; Kojzek 87'	Report	Harakaté (yellow card) 16', (goal) 30', 68'; Frieser (yellow card) 75'	Stadium: Lavanttal-Arena; Attendance: 4,279; Referee: Safak Barmaksiz

15 February 2026 19	Grazer AK	1–1	Red Bull Salzburg	Graz
14:30	Klassen 16'; Koch (yellow card) 47'; Maderner (yellow card) 90+3'; Owusu (yellow card) 90+3'	Report	Konaté 40'	Stadium: Merkur-Arena; Attendance: 7,453; Referee: Daniel Pfister

21 February 2026 20	TSV Hartberg	1–0	Grazer AK	Hartberg
17:00	Wilfinger 59'; Spendlhofer (yellow card) 65'; Diarra (yellow card) 72'	Report	Paumgartner (yellow card) 85'	Stadium: Stadion Hartberg; Attendance: 3,270; Referee: Markus Greinecker

1 March 2026 21	Grazer AK	2–1	SV Ried	Graz
17:00	Hofleitner 7', (yellow card) 53'; Harakaté 26'; Schriebl (yellow card) 44'; Owusu (yellow card) 85'; Italiano (yellow card) 86'; Stolz (yellow card) 89'; Große (red card) 90+3'	Report	Pomer (yellow card) 33'; Sollbauer (yellow card) 82'; Wernitznig (yellow card) 88'; Bajić 90+2'	Stadium: Merkur-Arena; Referee: Markus Hameter

8 March 2026 22	WSG Tirol	2–0	Grazer AK	Innsbruck
17:00	Kubatta 10', (yellow card) 38'; Ola-Adebomi (yellow card) 21', (goal) 43'; Sabitzer (yellow card) 55'	Report	Kreuzriegler (red card) 42'; Olesen (yellow card) 61'	Stadium: Tivoli Stadion Tirol; Attendance: 2,250; Referee: Florian Jäger

==== League table ====
Pos	Team	Pld	W	D	L	GF	GA	GD	Pts	Qualification
2	Wolfsberger AC	32	11	8	13	41	42	−1	28	Qualification for the Conference League play-offs
3	Rheindorf Altach	32	10	12	10	36	39	−3	27	
4	Grazer AK	32	9	10	13	42	45	−3	27	
5	WSG Tirol	32	10	10	12	40	52	−12	24	
6	Blau-Weiß Linz (R)	32	8	5	19	37	49	−12	21	Relegation to Austrian Football Second League

Source: Austrian Football Bundesliga
Rules for classification: 1) Points; 2) Points with (possible) half points subtracted due to rounding; 3) Head-to-head points; 4) Head-to-head goal difference; 5) Head-to-head goals scored; 6) Goal difference; 7) Goals scored; 8) Matches won; 9) Away matches won; 10) Away goals scored.
(R) Relegated

==== Results by round ====
Round	1	2	3	4	5	6	7	8	9	10
Ground	H	A	H	A	H	A	A	H	H	A
Result	W	W	W	L	D	L	L	W	D	W
Position	5	3	2	3	3	4	5	4	5	4

Source: Austrian Football Bundesliga
A = Away; H = Home; W = Win; D = Draw; L = Loss

==== Matches ====
14 March 2026 23	Grazer AK	2–0	Wolfsberger AC	Graz
17:00	Olesen 25'; Maderner 80'	Report	Diabaté (yellow card) 46'; Baumgartner (yellow card) 56'; Wimmer (yellow card) 73'; Sulzner (yellow card) 88'	Stadium: Merkur-Arena; Referee: Julian Weinberger

21 March 2026 24	WSG Tirol	1–5	Grazer AK	Innsbruck
17:00	Baden Frederiksen 19'; Kubatta (yellow card) 26'; Huetz (yellow card) 90+3'	Report	Lichtenberger (yellow card) 21'; Italiano 23', 63', 85' (pen.); Harakaté 39', 58' (pen.); Pines (yellow card) 88'; Maderner (yellow card) 90'	Stadium: Tivoli Stadion Tirol; Attendance: 1,150; Referee: Harald Lechner

4 April 2026 25	Grazer AK	2–1	Blau-Weiß Linz	Graz
17:00	Hofleitner 40' (pen.), (yellow card) 45+1'; Harakaté (yellow card) 79', (goal) 79'	Report	Ronivaldo 62'; Weissman (yellow card) 62'; Pašić (yellow card) 90+5'	Stadium: Merkur-Arena; Attendance: 8,100; Referee: Markus Hameter

11 April 2026 26	SCR Altach	1–0	Grazer AK	Altach
17:00	Bähre (yellow card) 43'; Greil 77'	Report		Stadium: Stadion Schnabelholz; Referee: Emil Ristoskov

17 April 2026 27	Grazer AK	1–1	SV Ried	Graz
19:30	Owusu (yellow card) 38'; Harakaté 47'; Schriebl (yellow card) 66'	Report	Steurer (yellow card) 45+1'; Bajic (yellow card) 45+4'; Havenaar 69'	Stadium: Merkur-Arena; Attendance: 7,699; Referee: Florian Jäger

21 April 2026 28	SV Ried	2–1	Grazer AK	Ried im Innkreis
20:30	Bajic 28', (yellow card) 83'; Mutandwa 35'; Rasner (yellow card) 90+2'	Report	Koch (yellow card) 13'; Olesen (yellow card) 38'; Klassen (yellow card) 38'; Pines (yellow card) 45+1'; Grosse 67'	Stadium: Josko Arena; Attendance: 4,346; Referee: Daniel Pfister

25 April 2026 29	Wolfsberger AC	1–0	Grazer AK	Wolfsberg
17:00	Gütlbauer (yellow card) 84'; Pink 84'	Report	Owusu (yellow card) 65'; Hofleitner (yellow card) 66'	Stadium: Lavanttal-Arena; Attendance: 4,803; Referee: Alain Sadikovski

2 May 2026 30	Grazer AK	4–0	WSG Tirol	Graz
17:00	Italiano 32'; Grosse 41', 55'; Lichtenberger (yellow card) 45+3', (goal) 70'	Report	Lawrence (yellow card) 48'; Jaunegg (yellow card) 90+1'	Stadium: Merkur-Arena; Referee: Achim Untergasser

9 May 2026 31	Grazer AK	2–2	SCR Altach	Graz
17:00	Schriebl (yellow card) 53'; Stolz (yellow card) 63'; Klassen (yellow card) 77'; Kreuzriegler (yellow card) 81'; Harakaté (yellow card) 83'; Maderner 88'; Satin 90+8'	Report	Milojević (yellow card) 25'; Greil 38'; Demaku 59'	Stadium: Merkur-Arena; Referee: Isa Simsek

16 May 2026 32	Blau-Weiß Linz	0–3	Grazer AK	Linz
17:00	Reiter (yellow card) 75'	Report	Kreuzriegler (yellow card) 5'; Lichtenberger 6'; Koch (yellow card) 45+3'; Hofleitner 52'; Maderner 90+1'	Stadium: Donauparkstadion; Attendance: 5,595; Referee: Julian Weinberger

=== Austrian Cup ===
25 July 2025 First round	FC Dornbirn	1–0	Grazer AK	Dornbirn
19:00	Herbály 6'; Stojnić (yellow card) 50'; Desnica (yellow card) 71'	Report	Fofana (yellow card) 75'	Stadium: Sparkasse Arena Birkenwiese; Attendance: 1,000; Referee: Stjepan Bosnjak

== Statistics ==
=== Appearances and goals ===
As of match played 16 May 2026

Players with no appearances are not included on the list
Italics indicate a loaned in player

No.	Pos	Nat	Player	Total		Bundesliga		Austrian Cup	
No.	Pos	Nat	Player	Apps	Goals	Apps	Goals	Apps	Goals
1	GK	(Austria) AUT	Jakob Meierhofer	18	0	17+0	0	1+0	0
2	DF	(United States) USA	Donovan Pines	30	1	29+1	1	0+0	0
3	DF	(Denmark) DEN	Ludwig Vraa	24	0	19+4	0	1+0	0
4	DF	(Austria) AUT	Martin Kreuzriegler	21	0	12+8	0	1+0	0
6	MF	(Luxembourg) LUX	Mathias Olesen	15	1	15+0	1	0+0	0
7	MF	(Austria) AUT	Murat Satin	29	2	14+14	2	0+1	0
8	MF	(Austria) AUT	Tobias Koch	27	0	19+8	0	0+0	0
9	FW	(Austria) AUT	Daniel Maderner	26	8	14+11	8	1+0	0
10	MF	(Austria) AUT	Christian Lichtenberger	30	3	13+16	3	1+0	0
11	FW	(Austria) AUT	Mark Grosse	11	3	4+7	3	0+0	0
12	GK	(Austria) AUT	Franz Stolz	15	0	15+0	0	0+0	0
14	DF	(Australia) AUS	Jacob Italiano	25	4	24+0	4	1+0	0
15	DF	(Austria) AUT	Lukas Graf	12	0	3+8	0	1+0	0
17	DF	(Austria) AUT	Thomas Schiestl	10	0	6+3	0	0+1	0
18	MF	(Austria) AUT	Zeteny Jano	12	0	6+5	0	1+0	0
20	MF	(Austria) AUT	Thorsten Schriebl	21	0	18+3	0	0+0	0
21	FW	(Kosovo) KOS	Arbnor Prenqi	3	0	0+2	0	0+1	0
22	MF	(France) FRA	Ramiz Harakaté	31	11	28+2	11	1+0	0
23	DF	(Georgia (country)) GEO	Mukhran Bagrationi	2	0	1+1	0	0+0	0
24	MF	(Austria) AUT	Tim Paumgartner	6	0	0+6	0	0+0	0
25	FW	(Austria) AUT	Alexander Hofleitner	27	5	14+13	5	0+0	0
27	DF	(Germany) GER	Yannick Oberleitner	8	0	3+4	0	0+1	0
28	DF	(Austria) AUT	Dominik Frieser	28	0	11+16	0	1+0	0
32	DF	(Russia) RUS	Leon Klassen	15	1	15+0	1	0+0	0
82	DF	(France) FRA	Beres Owusu	30	1	30+0	1	0+0	0
Player(s) who featured whilst on loan but returned to parent club during the season:
11	FW	(Slovenia) SLO	Tio Cipot	16	1	10+5	1	0+1	0
Player(s) who featured but departed the club permanently during the season:
6	MF	(Togo) TOG	Sadik Fofana	16	0	12+3	0	1+0	0
