= 2026–27 WSG Tirol season =

WSG Tirol
2026–27 season
- Manager: Philipp Semlic
- Stadium: Tivoli Stadion Tirol
- Austrian Football Bundesliga: 5th
- Austrian Cup: Third round
- Top goalscorer: League: Nikolai Baden; Michael Olakigbe (2 each); All: Nikolai Baden (6)
- Highest home attendance: 3,167 (vs. Red Bull Salzburg, 16 August 2026)
- Lowest home attendance: 1,642 (vs. TSV Hartberg, 13 September 2026)
- Average home league attendance: 2,349
- Biggest win: 6–0 (vs. SC Wieselburg, 24 July 2026)
- Biggest defeat: 3–0 (vs. Red Bull Salzburg, 16 August 2026) (vs. Rapid Wien, 18 September 2026)
- All statistics correct as of 18 September 2026.

The 2026–27 season is the 97th season in the history of WSG Tirol, and the club's eighth consecutive season in the Austrian Football Bundesliga. In addition to the domestic league, the team is scheduled to participate in the Austrian Cup.

== Transfers ==
=== In ===
| Pos. | Player | Transferred from | Fee | Date | Source |
|---|---|---|---|---|---|
| GK | (Austria) Julian Margreiter | (Austria) AKA Tirol | Undisclosed | 13 June 2026 | |
| MF | (Austria) Marc Striednig | (Austria) FC Liefering | Free | 22 June 2026 | |
| DF | (United States) Drew Murray | (Germany) SC Freiburg II | Free | 24 June 2026 | |
| GK | (Austria) Salko Hamzic | (Austria) Red Bull Salzburg | Undisclosed | 25 June 2026 | |
| MF | (Austria) Nemanja Celic | (Austria) SKN St. Pölten | Free | 29 June 2026 | |
| FW | (England) Michael Olakigbe | (England) Brentford | Loan | 30 June 2026 | |
| MF | (Austria) Murat Satin | (Austria) Grazer AK | Free | 3 July 2026 | |
| MF | (Austria) Husein Balic | | Free | 13 July 2026 | |
| FW | (Austria) Thomas Goiginger | (Austria) Blau-Weiß Linz | Free | 31 July 2026 | |
| MF | (Austria) Moritz Oswald | (Austria) Rapid Wien | Loan | 24 August 2026 | |
| FW | (Austria) Moritz Wels | Austria WIen | Undisclosed | 3 September 2026 | |

=== Out ===
| Pos. | Player | Transferred to | Fee | Date | Source |
|---|---|---|---|---|---|
| FW | (Austria) Tobias Anselm | (Austria) First Vienna | Undisclosed | 12 June 2026 | |
| MF | (Austria) Christian Huetz | Austria Salzburg | Loan | 16 June 2026 | |
| DF | (Austria) Lukas Schweighofer | Austria Salzburg | Loan | 16 June 2026 | |
| DF | (Austria) Thomas Geris | (Austria) Floridsdorfer AC | Free | 17 June 2026 | |
| FW | (Austria) Yannick Vötter | (Austria) SKU Amstetten | Free | 26 June 2026 | |
| GK | (Czech Republic) Adam Stejskal | | Released | 26 June 2026 | |
| MF | (Austria) Valentino Müller | | Released | 1 July 2026 | |
| MF | (Austria) Johannes Naschberger | | Released | 1 July 2026 | |
| DF | (Austria) Lukas Sulzbacher | | Released | 1 July 2026 | |
| GK | (Austria) Paul Schermer | (Austria) FC Kufstein | Free | 19 July 2026 | |
| DF | (Germany) Jamie Lawrence | (Belgium) OH Leuven | Free | 20 July 2026 | |
| FW | (England) Ademola Ola-Adebomi | (Belgium) KSC Lokeren | Undisclosed | 3 September 2026 | |

== Friendlies ==
| 19 June 2026 Friendly | FC Zirl (Austria) | 1–16 | (Austria) WSG Tirol |
| 17:30 | | Report |

| 27 June 2026 Friendly | WSG Tirol (Austria) | 0–4 | (Azerbaijan) Qarabağ |
| 17:00 | | Report | Sawo 34', 55', 56'; Durán 51' |

| 1 July 2026 Friendly | Austria Salzburg | Cancelled | (Austria) WSG Tirol |
| 18:30 | | Report |

| 4 July 2026 Friendly | WSG Tirol (Austria) | 0–0 | (Poland) Górnik Zabrze |
| 17:30 | | Report |

| 10 July 2026 Friendly | WSG Tirol (Austria) | 1–2 | (Ukraine) Polissya Zhytomyr |
| 18:00 | Baden 77' | Report | Nazarenko 44'; Filippov 85' |

| 17 July 2026 Friendly | WSG Tirol (Austria) | 2–3 | (Germany) Hertha Berlin |
| 18:30 | Ola-Adebomi 7' (pen.); Baden 12' | Report | Sessa 2', 54'; Ndi 76' |

== Competitions ==
=== Overall record ===
| Competition | First match | Last match | Starting round | Record | | | | | | | |
| Competition | First match | Last match | Starting round | Pld | W | D | L | GF | GA | GD | Win % |
|---|---|---|---|---|---|---|---|---|---|---|---|
| Austrian Football Bundesliga | 1 August 2026 | | Matchday 1 | 7 | 2 | 2 | 3 | 9 | 12 | −3 | 28.57 |
| Austrian Cup | 24 July 2026 | | First round | 2 | 2 | 0 | 0 | 10 | 0 | +10 | 100.00 |
| Total | | | | 9 | 4 | 2 | 3 | 19 | 12 | +7 | 44.44 |

Last updated: 18 September 2026
Source: Soccerway

=== Austrian Football Bundesliga ===
==== League table ====
| Pos | Team | Pld | W | D | L | GF | GA | GD | Pts | Qualification |
|---|---|---|---|---|---|---|---|---|---|---|
| 5 | Sturm Graz | 12 | 5 | 4 | 3 | 22 | 17 | +5 | 19 | Qualification for the Championship round |
| 6 | SV Ried | 12 | 4 | 4 | 4 | 21 | 22 | −1 | 16 | Qualification for the Championship round |
| 7 | WSG Tirol | 12 | 3 | 4 | 5 | 15 | 18 | −3 | 13 | Qualification for the Relegation round |
| 8 | Austria Lustenau | 12 | 3 | 2 | 7 | 15 | 30 | −15 | 11 | Qualification for the Relegation round |
| 9 | Grazer AK | 12 | 2 | 4 | 6 | 9 | 29 | −20 | 10 | Qualification for the Relegation round |

Updated to match(es) played on 8 November 2026. Source: Austrian Football Bundesliga
Rules for classification: 1) Points; 2) Head-to-head record; 3) Goal difference; 4) Goals scored; 5) Matches won; 6) Away matches won; 7) Away goals scored.

==== Results summary ====
| Overall | | | | | | | | Home | | | | | | Away | | | | | |
| Pld | W | D | L | GF | GA | GD | Pts | W | D | L | GF | GA | GD | W | D | L | GF | GA | GD |
|---|---|---|---|---|---|---|---|---|---|---|---|---|---|---|---|---|---|---|---|
| 7 | 2 | 2 | 3 | 9 | 12 | −3 | 8 | 0 | 2 | 1 | 3 | 6 | −3 | 2 | 0 | 2 | 6 | 6 | 0 |

Last updated: 18 September 2026.
Source: ADMIRAL Bundesliga

==== Results by round ====
| Round | 1 | 2 | 3 | 4 | 5 | 6 | 7 |
|---|---|---|---|---|---|---|---|
| Ground | H | A | H | A | A | H | A |
| Result | D | L | L | W | W | D | L |
| Position | 7 | 10 | 11 | 5 | 5 | 5 | 5 |

Updated to match(es) played on 18 September 2026. Source: ADMIRAL Bundesliga
A = Away; H = Home; W = Win; D = Draw; L = Loss

==== Matches ====
| 1 August 2026 1 | WSG Tirol | 1–1 | Sturm Graz | Innsbruck |
| 17:00 | Olakigbe 42'; Gschösser (yellow card) 84' | Report | Seidl (yellow card) 14'; Hödl (yellow card) 18'; Soglo (yellow card) 19'; Fosso (yellow card) 25'; Włodarczyk 29' | Stadium: Tivoli Stadion Tirol; Attendance: 2,239; Referee: Stefan Ebner |

| 7 August 2026 2 | SCR Altach | 3–1 | WSG Tirol | Altach |
| 19:30 | Greil 19', 87'; Massombo 56'; Niehoff (yellow card) 85' | Report | Murray (yellow card) 6'; Balic 14' | Stadium: Stadion Schnabelholz; Attendance: 5,029; Referee: Sebastian Gishamer |

| 16 August 2026 3 | WSG Tirol | 0–3 | Red Bull Salzburg | Innsbruck |
| 17:00 | Gschösser (yellow card) 22'; Olakigbe (yellow card) 50'; Celic (yellow card) 90+2' | Report | Konaté 15'; Krätzig 17'; Kitano 70' | Stadium: Tivoli Stadion Tirol; Attendance: 3,167; Referee: Christian-Petru Ciochirca |

| 28 August 2026 5 | Austria Lustenau | 0–4 | WSG Tirol | Lustenau |
| 19:30 | Verinac (yellow card) 46'; Böhm (yellow card) 66' | Report | Olakigbe 42'; Baden 52', 68' (pen.); Striednig 60'; Oswald (yellow card) 69' | Stadium: Reichshofstadion; Attendance: 4,219; Referee: Manuel Baumann |

| 2 September 2026 4 | Austria Wien | 0–1 | WSG Tirol | Wien |
| 19:30 | Dragović (yellow card) 69'; K. Lee (yellow card) 81'; Schablas (yellow card) 90+4' | Report | Murray (yellow card) 35', (goal) 66'; Striednig (yellow card) 79' | Stadium: Franz Horr Stadium; Attendance: 11,151; Referee: Harald Lechner |

| 13 September 2026 6 | WSG Tirol | 2–2 | TSV Hartberg | Innsbruck |
| 14:30 | Hinterseer 72'; Satin 90+3' (pen.) | Report | Lukić 14'; Hoffmann 44' | Stadium: Tivoli Stadion Tirol; Attendance: 1,642; Referee: Achim Untergasser |

| 18 September 2026 7 | Rapid Wien | 3–0 | WSG Tirol | Wien |
| 19:30 | Kara 33'; Dahl (yellow card) 39'; Seidl (yellow card) 41'; Bolla 67'; Wurmbrand (yellow card) 77', (goal) 86'; Horn (yellow card) 90' | Report | Gugganig (yellow card) 31'; Boras (yellow card) 47' | Stadium: Allianz Stadion; Attendance: 18,217; Referee: Harald Lechner |

=== Austrian Cup ===
| 24 July 2026 First round | SC Wieselburg | 0–6 | WSG Tirol | Wieselburg |
| 18:30 | | Report | Ola-Adebomi 23'; Baden 44', 52', 71'; Bambara 61'; Hinterseer 79' | Stadium: TTI-Arena; Attendance: 1,050; Referee: Jan Uwe Thiel |

| 5 September 2026 Second round | SV Leithaprodersdorf | 0–4 | WSG Tirol | Leithaprodersdorf |
| 17:00 | Koch (yellow card) 14'; Radivojević (yellow card) 16'; Markhardt (yellow card) 56' | Report | Wels 12', 32'; Taferner (yellow card) 29'; Kubatta (yellow card) 39'; Gschösser (yellow card) 42' (yellow-red card) 72'; Olakigbe 52'; Baden 87' | Stadium: LeithArena; Attendance: 1,612; Referee: Philip Gadler |

| 27 October 2026 Third round | Wacker Innsbruck | v | WSG Tirol | Innsbruck |
| 17:00 | | Report | | Stadium: Tivoli Stadion Tirol |

== Statistics ==
=== Appearances and goals ===
As of match played 18 September 2026

Players with no appearances are not included on the list
Italics indicate a loaned in player

| No. | Pos | Nat | Player | Total | | Bundesliga | | Austrian Cup | |
| No. | Pos | Nat | Player | Apps | Goals | Apps | Goals | Apps | Goals |
|---|---|---|---|---|---|---|---|---|---|
| 1 | GK | (Austria) AUT | Salko Hamzic | 8 | 0 | 7+0 | 0 | 1+0 | 0 |
| 3 | DF | (Austria) AUT | David Gugganig | 8 | 0 | 4+3 | 0 | 0+1 | 0 |
| 5 | DF | (United States) USA | Drew Murray | 9 | 1 | 7+0 | 1 | 1+1 | 0 |
| 6 | MF | (Austria) AUT | Marc Striednig | 6 | 1 | 5+1 | 1 | 0+0 | 0 |
| 8 | FW | (Denmark) DEN | Nikolai Baden Frederiksen | 9 | 6 | 6+1 | 2 | 1+1 | 4 |
| 10 | FW | (Austria) AUT | Thomas Sabitzer | 1 | 0 | 0+1 | 0 | 0+0 | 0 |
| 11 | MF | (Austria) AUT | Murat Satin | 8 | 1 | 5+2 | 1 | 1+0 | 0 |
| 13 | GK | (Austria) AUT | Alexander Eckmayr | 1 | 0 | 0+0 | 0 | 1+0 | 0 |
| 14 | DF | (Germany) GER | David Kubatta | 6 | 0 | 3+1 | 0 | 2+0 | 0 |
| 15 | MF | (Burkina Faso) BFA | Jaden Mazou Bambara | 4 | 1 | 0+2 | 0 | 0+2 | 1 |
| 16 | FW | (Austria) AUT | Lukas Hinterseer | 9 | 2 | 3+4 | 1 | 1+1 | 1 |
| 17 | FW | (England) ENG | Michael Olakigbe | 9 | 3 | 7+0 | 2 | 2+0 | 1 |
| 18 | MF | (Austria) AUT | Husein Balic | 9 | 1 | 6+1 | 1 | 1+1 | 0 |
| 22 | MF | (Austria) AUT | David Falkner | 2 | 0 | 0+1 | 0 | 0+1 | 0 |
| 23 | DF | (Croatia) CRO | Marco Boras | 9 | 0 | 7+0 | 0 | 2+0 | 0 |
| 27 | DF | (Austria) AUT | David Jaunegg | 4 | 0 | 0+2 | 0 | 1+1 | 0 |
| 28 | MF | (Austria) AUT | Moritz Oswald | 5 | 0 | 4+0 | 0 | 1+0 | 0 |
| 30 | MF | (Austria) AUT | Matthäus Taferner | 4 | 0 | 2+1 | 0 | 1+0 | 0 |
| 32 | MF | (Austria) AUT | Raphael Gschösser | 7 | 0 | 3+2 | 0 | 2+0 | 0 |
| 36 | MF | (Austria) AUT | Thomas Goiginger | 8 | 0 | 5+2 | 0 | 0+1 | 0 |
| 37 | FW | (Austria) AUT | Moritz Wels | 3 | 2 | 1+1 | 0 | 1+0 | 2 |
| 38 | MF | (Austria) AUT | Simon Wieser | 1 | 0 | 0+1 | 0 | 0+0 | 0 |
| 39 | DF | (Georgia (country)) GEO | Georgi Bedianashvili | 1 | 0 | 0+1 | 0 | 0+0 | 0 |
| 43 | MF | (Austria) AUT | Nemanja Celic | 8 | 0 | 2+4 | 0 | 2+0 | 0 |
Player(s) who featured but departed the club permanently during the season:
| 9 | FW | (England) ENG | Ademola Ola-Adebomi | 3 | 1 | 0+2 | 0 | 1+0 | 1 |
