= Alexander Hofleitner =

Austrian footballer (born 2000)

Personal information
- Date of birth: 3 May 2000 (age 26)
- Place of birth: Eisenstadt, Austria
- Position: Forward

Team information
- Current team: Grazer AK
- Number: 25

Youth career
- 2007–2016: SV St. Margarethen
- 2016–2018: ASKÖ Klingenbach

Senior career*
Years	Team	Apps	(Gls)
2017–2023	ASKÖ Klingenbach	77	(34)
2023–2025	Kapfenberger SV	47	(25)
2025–	Grazer AK	34	(7)
- * Club domestic league appearances and goals as of 19:36, 16 September 2026 (BST)

Alexander Hofleitner (born 3 May 2000) is an Austrian professional footballer who plays as a forward for Austrian Bundesliga club Grazer AK.

== Early life and career ==
Hofleitner was born in the Burgenland capital of Eisenstadt, and played locally for SV St. Margareithen. In 2016, he joined ASKÖ Klingenbach, and made his senior debut on 10 June 2017, in a 3–0 defeat to SV Eberau.

On 20 June 2023, Hofleitner joined 2. Liga club Kapfenberger SV, who fended off other second-tier rivals to secure his signature. He made his professional football debut on 27 August 2023, coming on as a second-half substitute for Philipp Seidl in a 3–3 draw with Sturm Graz II.

On 10 July 2025, Hofleitner joined Austrian Bundesliga side Grazer AK, following two impressive second-tier seasons in which he achieved 25 league goals in 47 appearances.

== Career statistics ==
As of match played 12 September 2026

Appearances and goals by club, season and competition
Club	Season	League			Austrian Cup		Other		Total	
Club	Season	Division	Apps	Goals	Apps	Goals	Apps	Goals	Apps	Goals
ASKÖ Klingenbach	2016–17	Landesliga Burgenland	1	0	0	0	0	0	1	0
ASKÖ Klingenbach	2017–18	Landesliga Burgenland	0	0	0	0	0	0	0	0
ASKÖ Klingenbach	2018–19	Burgenland 2. Liga Nord	17	1	0	0	0	0	17	1
ASKÖ Klingenbach	2019–20	Landesliga Burgenland	2	0	0	0	0	0	2	0
ASKÖ Klingenbach	2020–21	Landesliga Burgenland	5	0	0	0	0	0	5	0
ASKÖ Klingenbach	2021–22	Landesliga Burgenland	25	11	0	0	0	0	25	11
ASKÖ Klingenbach	2022–23	Landesliga Burgenland	27	22	0	0	3 (Note: Appearance(s) in the Burgenland Cup)	3	30	25
ASKÖ Klingenbach	Total		77	34	0	0	3	3	80	37
Kapfenberger SV	2023–24	2. Liga	23	7	2	0	0	0	25	7
Kapfenberger SV	2024–25	2. Liga	24	18	2	2	0	0	26	20
Kapfenberger SV	Total		47	25	4	2	0	0	51	27
Grazer AK	2025–26	Bundesliga	28	5	0	0	0	0	28	5
Grazer AK	2026–27	Bundesliga	6	2	2	2	0	0	8	4
Grazer AK	Total		34	7	2	2	0	0	36	9
Career total			158	66	6	4	3	3	167	73
