= Drew Murray =

American soccer player (born 2005)

Personal information
- Full name: Drew Hokulani Murray
- Date of birth: 27 October 2005 (age 21)
- Place of birth: San Jose, California, United States
- Height: 1.88 m (6 ft 2 in)
- Position: Defender

Team information
- Current team: WSG Tirol
- Number: 5

Youth career
- –2022: San Jose Earthquakes
- 2023–2024: SC Freiburg

Senior career*
Years	Team	Apps	(Gls)
2022	San Jose Earthquakes II	2	(0)
2023	Oakland Roots SC	1	(0)
2024–2025	SC Freiburg II	13	(0)
2025–2026	SC Freiburg	0	(0)
2025–2026	→ Rot-Weiß Oberhausen (loan)	24	(1)
2026–	WSG Tirol	8	(1)

International career^{‡}
2023–2024	United States U19	5	(0)
- * Club domestic league appearances and goals as of 10 October 2026 ‡ National team caps and goals as of 11 June 2024

Drew Hokulani Murray (born 27 October 2005) is an American professional soccer player who plays as a defender for Austrian Bundesliga club WSG Tirol.

== Early life ==
Murray was born on 27 October 2005. Born in San Jose, California, United States, he is a native of California, United States. Growing up, he played baseball and basketball.

== Club career ==
As a youth player, Murray joined the youth academy of San Jose Earthquakes and was promoted to the club's reserve team in 2022, where he made two league appearances and scored zero goals. Following his stint there, he signed for Oakland Roots SC in 2023.

During the summer of 2023, he joined the youth academy of German Bundesliga side SC Freiburg and was promoted to the club's reserve team in 2024. Subsequently, he was sent on loan to Rot-Weiß Oberhausen in Germany in 2025. On 10 August 2025, he debuted for the club during a 3–1 home win over Bonner SC in the league. German newspaper Neue Ruhr Zeitung wrote in 2026 that he was "a key figure in the defense" while playing for them. Ahead of the 2026–27 season, he signed for Austrian outfit WSG Tirol.

== International career ==
Murray is a United States youth international and has represented the country internationally at under-19 level.

On 24 March 2023, he debuted for the United States men's national under-19 soccer team during a 3–1 away friendly win over the Argentina national under-19 football team.

== Style of play ==
Murray plays as a defender. Right-footed, he is known for his passing ability.
