= Salko Hamzić =

Bosnian footballer (born 2006)

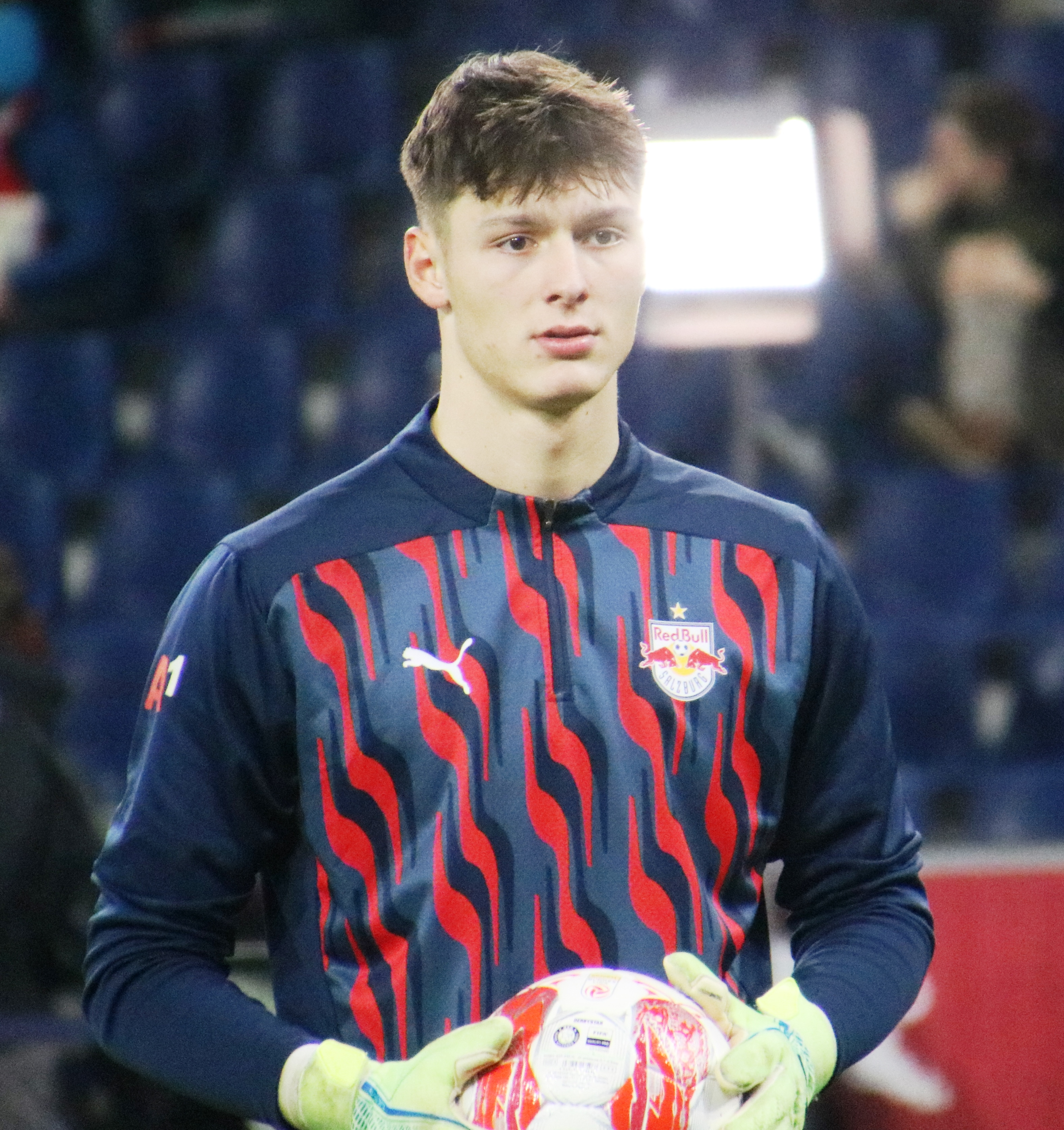
- Hamzić with Red Bull Salzburg in 2025

Personal information
- Date of birth: 17 September 2006 (age 20)
- Place of birth: Kalesija, Bosnia and Herzegovina
- Height: 1.90 m (6 ft 3 in)
- Position: Goalkeeper

Team information
- Current team: WSG Tirol
- Number: 1

Youth career
- 2015: UFC Siezenheim
- 2015–2019: Austria Salzburg
- 2019–2023: Red Bull Salzburg

Senior career*
Years	Team	Apps	(Gls)
2023–2026	Red Bull Salzburg	0	(0)
2023–2026	Liefering	27	(0)
2026–	WSG Tirol	12	(0)

International career^{‡}
2024–2025	Austria U19	9	(0)
2026–	Bosnia and Herzegovina	1	(0)
- * Club domestic league appearances and goals as of 8 November 2026 ‡ National team caps and goals as of 2 October 2026

Salko Hamzić (pronounced [sâːlko xǎmzitɕ]; born 17 September 2006) is a Bosnian professional footballer who plays as a goalkeeper for Austrian Bundesliga club WSG Tirol and the Bosnia and Herzegovina national team.

Hamzić started his professional career at Red Bull Salzburg, who assigned him to Liefering in 2023. Three years later, he switched to WSG Tirol.

A former Austrian youth international, Hamzić made his senior international debut for Bosnia and Herzegovina in 2026.

== Early life ==
Hamzić was born in Tuzla, Bosnia and Herzegovina and lived in the nearby town of Kalesija until 2012, after which he moved with his family to Salzburg.

== Club career ==
=== Early career ===
Hamzić started playing football at a local club, UFC Siezenheim, before moving to Austria Salzburg. He then joined the youth academy of his hometown team Red Bull Salzburg in 2019. He made his professional debut playing for Red Bull Salzburg's feeder squad, Liefering, against SV Stripfing on 15 September 2023 at the age of 16.

In June 2026, he signed with WSG Tirol.

== International career ==
Despite representing Austria at the under-19 level, Hamzić decided to play for Bosnia and Herzegovina at the senior level.

In September 2026, he received his first senior call up, for UEFA Nations League B games against Poland, Romania and Sweden. He debuted against Sweden on 2 October.

== Personal life ==
Hamzić is a practising Muslim; together with international teammates Sead Kolašinac, Amar Memić, Tarik Muharemović, Haris Tabaković, Nail Omerović, Zinedin Smajlović, Nihad Mujakić, Samed Baždar and Ermin Mahmić he visited a mosque in Ilidža during the national team's concentration.

== Career statistics ==
=== Club ===
As of match played 8 November 2026

Appearances and goals by club, season and competition
Club	Season	League			Austrian Cup		Continental		Total	
Club	Season	Division	Apps	Goals	Apps	Goals	Apps	Goals	Apps	Goals
Liefering	2023–24	2. Liga	8	0	–		–		8	0
Liefering	2024–25	2. Liga	14	0	–		–		14	0
Liefering	2025–26	2. Liga	5	0	–		–		5	0
Liefering	Total		27	0	–		–		27	0
WSG Tirol	2026–27	Austrian Bundesliga	12	0	2	0	–		14	0
Career total			38	0	2	0	–		41	0

=== International ===
As of match played 2 October 2026

Appearances and goals by national team and year
National team	Year	Apps	Goals
Bosnia and Herzegovina
Bosnia and Herzegovina	2026	1	0
Total		1	0
