= Souleyman Mandey =

Austrian footballer (born 2006)

Personal information
- Date of birth: 6 February 2006 (age 20)
- Place of birth: Vienna, Austria
- Height: 1.89 m (6 ft 2 in)
- Position: Midfielder

Team information
- Current team: Grazer AK
- Number: 17

Youth career
- 2022–2023: Rangers
- 2023–2024: West Bromwich Albion

Senior career*
Years	Team	Apps	(Gls)
2024–2026	West Bromwich Albion	1	(0)
2024	→ Stourbridge (loan)	4	(5)
2026–	Grazer AK	1	(0)

International career^{‡}
2023	Austria U17	1	(0)
2026–	Austria U21	1	(0)
- * Club domestic league appearances and goals as of 16 August 2026 ‡ National team caps and goals as of 31 March 2026 (UTC)

Souleyman Mandey (born 6 February 2006) is an Austrian professional footballer who plays as a midfielder for Austrian Football Bundesliga club Grazer AK.

== Club career ==
=== West Bromwich Albion ===
Mandey joined the academy of Scottish club Rangers in 2022, before joining English side West Bromwich Albion in 2023. On 21 September 2024, he joined Southern League side Stourbridge on loan. On 3 July 2025, he signed a new two-year contract with the club.

Mandey made his professional debut for the club on 2 May 2026, in a 2–1 defeat to Sheffield Wednesday in the Championship.

=== Grazer AK ===
On 6 August 2026, Mandey returned to Austria, signing for Bundesliga club Grazer AK for an undisclosed fee.

== International career ==
Mandey has represented the Austria U21 side.

== Career statistics ==
As of 2 May 2026

Appearances and goals by club, season and competition
Club	Season	League			National Cup		League Cup		Other		Total	
Club	Season	Division	Apps	Goals	Apps	Goals	Apps	Goals	Apps	Goals	Apps	Goals
West Bromwich Albion	2024–25	Championship	0	0	0	0	0	0	—		0	0
West Bromwich Albion	2025–26	Championship	1	0	0	0	0	0	—		1	0
West Bromwich Albion	Total		1	0	0	0	0	0	—		1	0
Stourbridge (loan)	2024–25	Southern League Premier Division	4	5	—		—		—		4	5
Grazer AK	2026–27	Austrian Football Bundesliga	0	0	0	0	—		—		0	0
Career total			1	0	0	0	0	0	0	0	1	0
