= Ademola Ola-Adebomi =

English association football player

Personal information
- Full name: Ademola Oladipupo Ola-Adebomi
- Date of birth: 3 September 2003 (age 23)
- Place of birth: London, England
- Height: 1.95 m (6 ft 5 in)
- Position: Forward

Team information
- Current team: Lokeren
- Number: 20

Youth career
- 2012–2023: Crystal Palace

Senior career*
Years	Team	Apps	(Gls)
2023–2025	Crystal Palace	0	(0)
2024	→ Burton Albion (loan)	14	(1)
2024–2025	→ Beveren (loan)	8	(0)
2025–2026	WSG Tirol	25	(3)
2026–	Lokeren	2	(1)
- * Club domestic league appearances and goals as of 20 September 2026

Ademola Oladipupo Ola-Adebomi (born 3 September 2003) is an English footballer who plays as a forward for Challenger Pro League club Lokeren.

== Career ==
Described as a centre-forward, Ola-Adebomi joined Crystal Palace as a youngster and progressed through their youth academy before signing his first professional contract with the club in April 2022. He was promoted to the Under-21s for the 2022–23 season. Ola-Adebomi made his first appearance in a senior Crystal Palace matchday squad in September 2023, for a Premier League match against Manchester United which Palace won 1-0, but remained an unused substitute. He did play for the club in the EFL Trophy that season and scored 12 goals in 21 games for the Crystal Palace U21 side prior to joining Burton Albion on a six-month loan deal in January 2024.

Ola-Adebomi made his professional debut on 27 January 2024, as Burton played away in EFL League One against Cambridge United. The following weekend, he made his first league start as Burton played Lincoln City.

On 6 August 2024, Ola-Adebomi joined Belgian club Beveren on loan until the end of the 2024–25 season. On 10 January 2025, Ola-Adebomi returned to Palace after his loan was cut short by Beveren.

On 23 July 2025, Ola-Adebomi moved to Austrian Bundesliga side WSG Tirol on a free transfer, signing a long-term contract. On 8 March 2026, he scored his first league in a 2–0 win over Grazer.

On 3 September 2026, Ola-Adebomi signed for KSC Lokeren for an undisclosed fee, returning to Belgium.

== Personal life ==
Ola-Adebomi is of Nigerian descent.

== Career statistics ==
As of match played 12 September 2026

Appearances and goals by club, season and competition
Club	Season	League			National Cup (Note: Includes FA Cup, Belgian Cup and Austrian Cup)		League Cup (Note: Includes EFL Cup)		Other		Total	
Club	Season	Division	Apps	Goals	Apps	Goals	Apps	Goals	Apps	Goals	Apps	Goals
Crystal Palace U21	2022–23	–	–		–		–		3 (Note: Appearance(s) in EFL Trophy)	0	3	0
Crystal Palace U21	2023–24	–	–		–		–		1	1	1	1
Crystal Palace U21	Total		0	0	0	0	0	0	4	1	4	1
Crystal Palace	2023–24	Premier League	0	0	0	0	0	0	0	0	0	0
Burton Albion (loan)	2023–24	League One	14	1	0	0	0	0	0	0	14	1
Beveren (loan)	2024–25	Challenger Pro League	8	0	0	0	0	0	0	0	8	0
WSG Tirol	2025–26	Austrian Bundesliga	24	3	2	1	–		0	0	26	4
WSG Tirol	2026–27	Austrian Bundesliga	2	0	1	1	–		0	0	3	1
WSG Tirol	Total		26	3	3	2	0	0	0	0	29	5
KSC Lokeren	2026–27	Challenger Pro League	1	1	0	0	–		0	0	1	1
Career total			49	5	3	2	0	0	4	1	56	8
