= Tim Trummer =

Austrian footballer (born 2005)

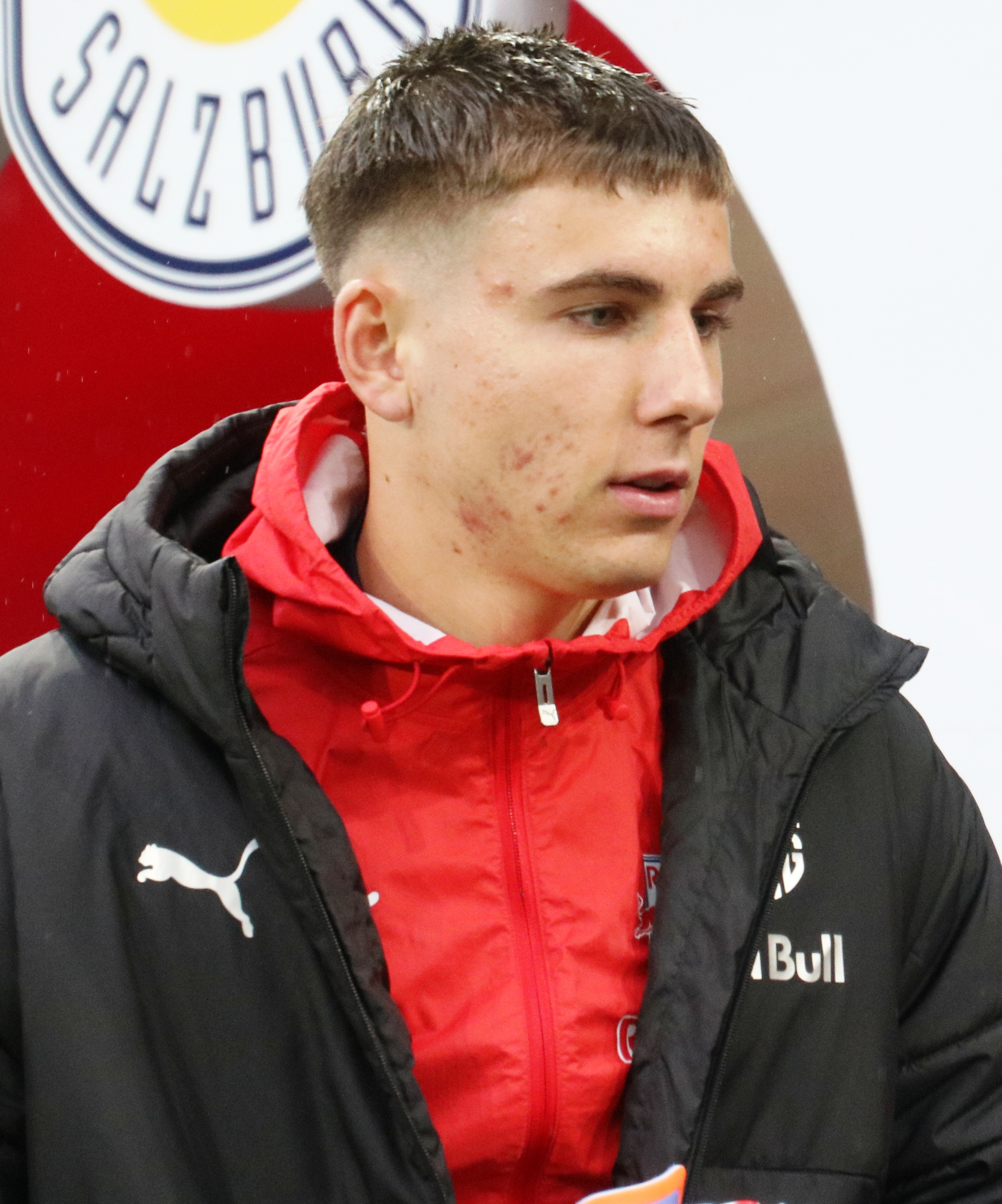
- Trummer in 2025

Personal information
- Date of birth: 10 November 2005 (age 21)
- Place of birth: Austria
- Height: 1.89 m (6 ft 2 in)
- Positions: Full-back; wing-back

Team information
- Current team: Grazer AK (on loan from Red Bull Salzburg)
- Number: 37

Youth career
- JAZ GU-Süd
- 2018–2023: Red Bull Salzburg

Senior career*
Years	Team	Apps	(Gls)
2023–2026	FC Liefering	44	(0)
2025–	Red Bull Salzburg	23	(1)
2026–	→ Grazer AK (loan)	0	(0)

International career^{‡}
2022–2023	Austria U18	8	(1)
2023–2024	Austria U19	8	(2)
2025–	Austria U21	8	(0)
- * Club domestic league appearances and goals as of 17 May 2026 ‡ National team caps and goals as of 31 March 2026

Tim Trummer (born 10 November 2005) is an Austrian professional footballer who plays as a defender for Austrian Bundesliga club Grazer AK, on loan from Red Bull Salzburg.

== Club career ==
Trummer is a youth product of RB Salzburg, where he started his professional career with FC Liefering in the Austrian Second League in 2023.

By the 2024–25 season, he had established himself as a starter with FC Liefering, but also with Salzburg's youth team in the UEFA Youth League, regularly captaining the side that reached the semi-final of the competition. He however missed this last game of the competition, having already been added to Salzburg's senior team.

Trummer made his debut with RB Salzburg in a 0–1 Austrian Football Bundesliga win over Austria Vienna on 22 February 2025.

On 18 June 2026, Trummer moved on loan to Grazer AK.

== International career ==
Trummer is a youth international for Austria, having played with teams from the under-19 to the under-21.

== Career statistics ==
As of match played 22 April 2026

Appearances and goals by club, season and competition
Club	Season	League			Austrian Cup		Europe		Other		Total	
Club	Season	Division	Apps	Goals	Apps	Goals	Apps	Goals	Apps	Goals	Apps	Goals
FC Liefering	2023–24	2. Liga	25	0	0	0	—		—		25	0
FC Liefering	2024–25	2. Liga	15	0	0	0	—		—		15	0
FC Liefering	2025–26	2. Liga	4	0	0	0	—		—		4	0
FC Liefering	Total		44	0	0	0	—		—		44	0
Red Bull Salzburg	2024–25	Austrian Bundesliga	11	0	—		—		0	0	11	0
Red Bull Salzburg	2025–26	Austrian Bundesliga	12	1	3	0	5 (Note: Appearances in UEFA Europa League)	0	—		20	1
Red Bull Salzburg	Total		23	1	3	0	5	0	0	0	31	1
Career total			67	1	3	0	5	0	0	0	75	1
