= Ismaël Guerti =

Footballer (born 2004)

Personal information
- Date of birth: 30 July 2004 (age 22)
- Place of birth: Argenteuil, France
- Height: 1.78 m (5 ft 10 in)
- Position: Attacking midfielder

Team information
- Current team: Grazer AK
- Number: 29

Youth career
- –2019: Boulogne-Billancourt
- 2019–2022: Lens

Senior career*
Years	Team	Apps	(Gls)
2022–2024	Le Havre B	39	(2)
2024–2026	Metz B	38	(12)
2025–2026	Metz	4	(0)
2026–	Grazer AK	0	(0)

International career
2021	Morocco U17	1	(0)
- * Club domestic league appearances and goals as of 20 May 2026

Ismaël Guerti (born 30 July 2004) is a professional footballer who plays as an attacking midfielder for Austrian Bundesliga club Grazer AK. Born in France, he has represented Morocco at youth international level.

== Club career ==
Guerti joined the youth academy of Lens from Boulogne-Billancourt. In 2022, he left Lens to sign for the reserve team of Le Havre in the Championnat National 3. In the summer of 2024, he signed for Metz's reserve side. In the 2024–25 Championnat National 3 season, he scored five goals and registered seven assists, performances which pushed him into the club's first team. On 10 May 2025, he made his professional debut in Ligue 2 as a substitute in a 3–2 away win over Laval. On 24 June 2025, Guerti signed his first professional contract with Metz, a deal until 2027.

On 17 June 2026, Guerti joined Grazer AK in Austria for two years, with an optional third year.

== International career ==
Guerti has represented the Morocco under-17s at international level.

== Personal life ==
Born in France, Guerti is of Moroccan descent. He has both French and Moroccan citizenship.

== Career statistics ==
As of match played 29 October 2025

Appearances and goals by club, season and competition
Club	Season	League			Cup		Europe		Other		Total	
Club	Season	Division	Apps	Goals	Apps	Goals	Apps	Goals	Apps	Goals	Apps	Goals
Le Havre B	2022–23	National 3	21	2	—		—		—		21	2
Le Havre B	2023–24	National 3	18	0	—		—		—		18	0
Le Havre B	Total		39	2	—		—		—		39	2
Metz B	2024–25	National 3	23	5	—		—		—		23	5
Metz B	2024–25	National 3	1	0	—		—		—		1	0
Metz B	Total		24	5	—		—		—		24	5
Metz	2024–25	Ligue 2	1	0	0	0	—		—		1	0
Metz	2025–26	Ligue 1	3	0	0	0	—		—		3	0
Metz	Total		4	0	0	0	—		—		4	0
Career total			67	7	0	0	0	0	0	0	67	7
