= Anderson (footballer, born January 1998) =

Brazilian footballer

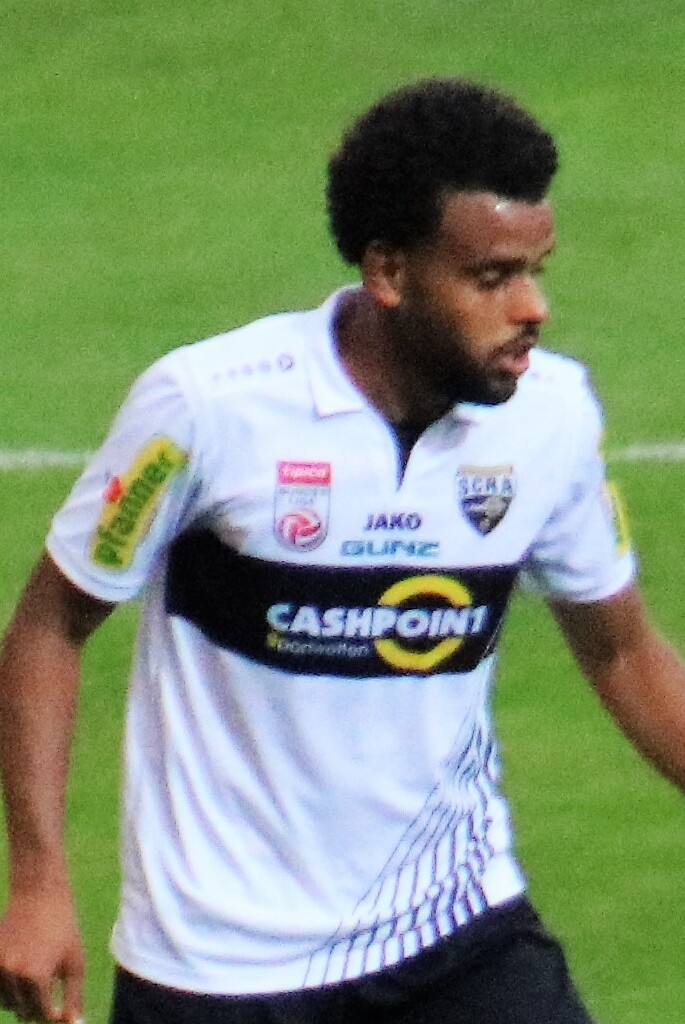
- Anderson in 2020

Personal information
- Full name: Anderson dos Santos Gomes
- Date of birth: 3 January 1998 (age 28)
- Place of birth: São Paulo, Brazil
- Height: 1.84 m (6 ft 0 in)
- Position: Right-back

Team information
- Current team: Grazer AK
- Number: 28

Youth career
- Osasco Audax

Senior career*
| Years | Team | Apps | (Gls) |
| 2017–2018 | Osasco Audax | 0 | (0) |
| 2019 | Rheindorf Altach II | 1 | (0) |
| 2019–2022 | Rheindorf Altach | 40 | (1) |
| 2021–2022 | → Dornbirn (loan) | 8 | (1) |
| 2022–2024 | Austria Lustenau | 73 | (7) |
| 2024–2026 | Blau-Weiß Linz | 37 | (2) |
| 2026– | Grazer AK | 2 | (0) |
- * Club domestic league appearances and goals as of 16 August 2026

Anderson dos Santos Gomes (born 3 January 1998), known as just Anderson, is a Brazilian professional footballer who plays as a right-back for Austrian Football Bundesliga club Grazer AK.

== Club career ==
On 31 August 2021, Anderson joined Dornbirn on loan for the 2021–22 season.

On 14 January 2022, he signed a six-month contract with Austria Lustenau.

== Honours ==
Austria Lustenau

- Austrian Football Second League: 2021–22
