= Ludwig Vraa =

Danish footballer (born 2005)

Personal information
- Full name: Ludwig William Vraa-Jensen
- Date of birth: 23 June 2005 (age 21)
- Place of birth: Denmark
- Height: 1.87 m (6 ft 2 in)
- Position: Centre-back

Team information
- Current team: Grazer AK
- Number: 3

Youth career
- –2018: HIK
- 2018–2023: Brøndby

Senior career*
Years	Team	Apps	(Gls)
2023–2025	Brøndby	0	(0)
2025–	Grazer AK	25	(0)

International career^{‡}
2021–2022	Denmark U17	14	(0)
2022–2023	Denmark U18	8	(0)
2023–2024	Denmark U19	12	(0)
2025–	Denmark U21	2	(0)
- * Club domestic league appearances and goals as of 14:09, 27 September 2026 (UTC) ‡ National team caps and goals as of 18 November 2025

Ludwig William Vraa-Jensen (born 23 June 2005) is a Danish professional footballer who plays as a centre-back for Grazer AK.

== Club career ==
As a youth player, Vraa joined the youth academy of Danish side Brøndby IF. Following his stint there, he signed for Austrian side Grazer AK ahead of the 2025–26 season.

== International career ==
Vraa is a Denmark youth international. During the summer of 2024, he played for the Denmark national under-19 football team at the 2024 UEFA European Under-19 Championship.

== Style of play ==
Vraa plays as a defender. Two-footed, he is known for his speed.
