= Franz Stolz =

Austrian footballer (born 2001)

Personal information
- Full name: Franz Valentin Stolz
- Date of birth: 14 February 2001 (age 25)
- Place of birth: Bruck an der Mur, Austria
- Height: 1.93 m (6 ft 4 in)
- Position: Goalkeeper

Team information
- Current team: Genoa
- Number: 99

Youth career
- 2006–2012: SV Oberaich
- 2012–2013: SC Bruck/Mur
- 2013–2015: Grazer AK
- 2015–2018: Kapfenberger SV

Senior career*
| Years | Team | Apps | (Gls) |
| 2016–2021 | Kapfenberger SV | 32 | (0) |
| 2016 | → SV Thörl (loan) | 0 | (0) |
| 2017–2018 | Kapfenberger SV II | 5 | (0) |
| 2021–2023 | SKN St. Pölten | 49 | (0) |
| 2024– | Genoa | 0 | (0) |
| 2025–2026 | → Rapid București (loan) | 12 | (0) |
| 2026 | → Grazer AK (loan) | 15 | (0) |

International career
| 2018–2019 | Austria U18 | 5 | (0) |
| 2021–2022 | Austria U21 | 1 | (0) |
- * Club domestic league appearances and goals as of 10 June 2026

Franz Valentin Stolz (born 14 February 2001) is an Austrian professional footballer who plays as a goalkeeper for Serie A club Genoa.

== Early life ==
Stolz is a native of Oberaich, Austria.

== Career ==
=== Early career in Austria ===
Stolz started his professional career with Austrian club Kapfenberger SV, progressing from the youth setup into the senior squad. He made his debut in the Austrian 2. Liga in a 3–0 defeat against SKU Amstetten on 27 July 2018. He spent several seasons in Austria's second tier, establishing himself as a reliable goalkeeper.

=== SKN St. Pölten ===
In July 2021, Stolz moved to SKN St. Pölten on a free transfer, signing a two-year contract. He became the first‑choice goalkeeper and accumulated numerous league appearances over three seasons, competing in the Austrian 2. Liga and contributing to the team's defensive strength.

=== Move to Italy ===
On 27 January 2024, Stolz signed for Genoa in Serie A, marking a step up to one of Europe's top‑flight leagues. The club announced his arrival as a new signing for their Primavera (U-19) squad with an option for the first team. Despite the high‑profile move, he did not make a first‑team appearance for Genoa before being loaned out to gain more playing time.

=== Loan to Romania ===
In January 2025, Genoa loaned Stolz to Romanian Liga I side FC Rapid București for the remainder of the season. He featured regularly during his loan spell, making multiple appearances in SuperLiga matches and recording several clean sheets, including in a 2–0 victory over FCV Farul Constanța.

=== Return to Austria on loan ===
In early January 2026, Stolz's loan with Rapid concluded and he was subsequently loaned to Austrian club Grazer AK for the remainder of the 2025–26 season. The move marked his return to his home country to continue his development and strengthen Grazer's goalkeeping department.
