= Thomas Schiestl =

Austrian footballer

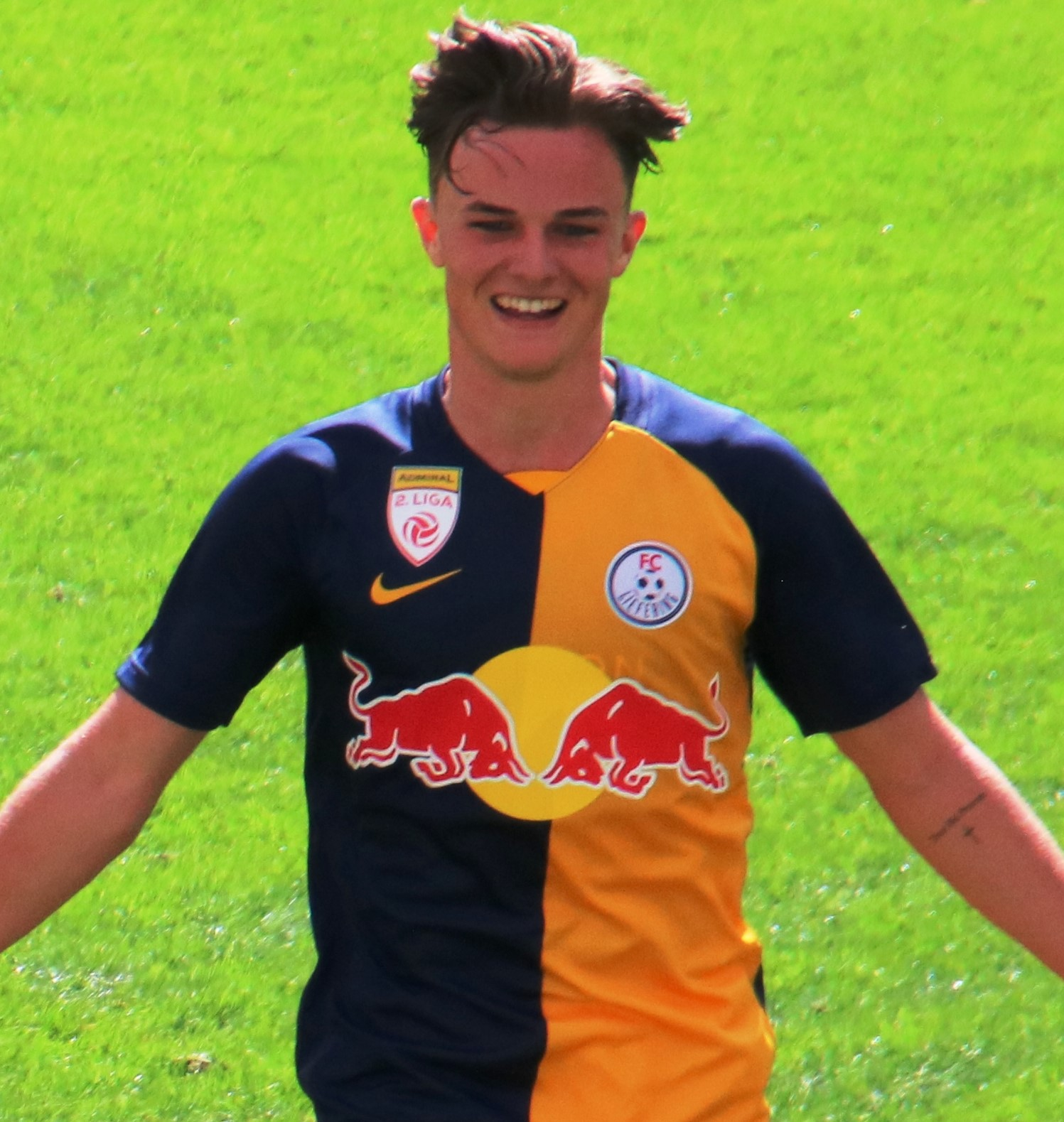
- Schiestl in 2021

Personal information
- Date of birth: 31 August 2002 (age 24)
- Place of birth: Schwaz, Austria
- Position: Midfielder

Team information
- Current team: Blau-Weiß Linz
- Number: 27

Youth career
- Red Bull Salzburg

Senior career*
Years	Team	Apps	(Gls)
2020–2022	FC Liefering	19	(1)
2022–2026	Grazer AK	45	(6)
2026–	Blau-Weiß Linz	3	(0)
- * Club domestic league appearances and goals as of 14 August 2026

Thomas Schiestl (born 31 August 2002) is an Austrian professional footballer who plays as a midfielder for 2. Liga club Blau-Weiß Linz.

== Career statistics ==
As of match played 13 September 2020

Appearances and goals by club, season and competition
Club	Season	League			Cup		Continental		Total	
Club	Season	Division	Apps	Goals	Apps	Goals	Apps	Goals	Apps	Goals
FC Liefering	2019–20	Austrian Second League	3	0	0	0	—	—	3	0
FC Liefering	2020–21	Austrian Second League	11	0	0	0	—	—	11	0
FC Liefering	Total		11	0	0	0	0	0	11	0
Career total			14	0	0	0	0	0	14	0

== Honours ==
FC Liefering

- Austrian Football First League runner-up: 2021
