= Beres Owusu =

French footballer (born 2003)

Personal information
- Date of birth: 19 September 2003 (age 23)
- Place of birth: Paris, France
- Height: 1.85 m (6 ft 1 in)
- Position: Centre-back

Team information
- Current team: Grazer AK (on loan from Saint-Étienne)
- Number: 82

Youth career
- –2020: AAS Sarcelles
- 2020–2022: Saint-Étienne

Senior career*
Years	Team	Apps	(Gls)
2021–	Saint-Étienne B	46	(1)
2024–	Saint-Étienne	1	(0)
2024–2025	→ Quevilly-Rouen (loan)	25	(0)
2025–	→ Grazer AK (loan)	30	(1)
- * Club domestic league appearances and goals as of 10 June 2026

Beres Owusu (born 19 September 2003) is a French professional footballer who plays as a centre-back for Austrian Bundesliga club Grazer AK, on loan from Ligue 2 club Saint-Étienne.

== Career ==
Owusu joined the academy of Saint-Étienne from AAS Sarcelles in 2020. He signed his first professional contract on 22 December 2022, a deal lasting until 2025. On 17 August 2024, Owusu made his professional debut for Saint-Étienne in a 1–0 defeat away to Monaco on the first matchday of the 2024–25 Ligue 1 season, playing the full 90 minutes. On 2 September 2024, he extended his contract with Saint-Étienne to 2027 and joined Championnat National club Quevilly-Rouen on a season-long loan. On 27 September 2024, he received the first red card of his professional career in a match against Le Mans.

On 6 August 2025, Owusu was loaned out to Austrian Bundesliga club Grazer AK.

== Personal life ==
Born in France, Owusu is of Ghanaian descent.
