= Moritz Wels =

Austrian footballer (born 2004)

Personal information
- Date of birth: 25 September 2004 (age 22)
- Place of birth: Austria
- Height: 1.86 m (6 ft 1 in)
- Position: Midfielder

Team information
- Current team: WSG Tirol
- Number: 37

Youth career
- 2012–2015: Dechantskirchen
- 2015–2021: Sturm Graz

Senior career*
Years	Team	Apps	(Gls)
2021–2023	Sturm Graz II	41	(12)
2021–2023	Sturm Graz	4	(1)
2023–2026	Austria Wien	24	(0)
2023	→ SV Stripfing (loan)	11	(4)
2025–2026	→ WSG Tirol (loan)	30	(5)
2026–	WSG Tirol	0	(0)

International career^{‡}
2019	Austria U15	1	(0)
2019–2020	Austria U16	5	(0)
2020	Austria U17	1	(0)
2021–2022	Austria U18	5	(3)
2022	Austria U19	3	(1)
2022–	Austria U21	9	(1)
- * Club domestic league appearances and goals as of 7 September 2026 ‡ National team caps and goals as of 14 November 2025

Moritz Wels (born 25 September 2004) is an Austrian professional footballer who plays for Austrian Bundesliga club WSG Tirol.

== Club career ==
=== Sturm Graz ===
Having played with Sturm Graz since the under-12, Moritz Wels made his professional debut for The Blackies on 27 October 2021, coming on as a substitute during a Cup game against SV Ried. Having then become the youngest player to ever play for the club, he signed his first professional contract a few days after.

The following week, Wels played his first Europa League game, replacing Anderson Niangbo during a 1–1 away draw against Real Sociedad, becoming the youngest Austrian to ever play in the competition, surpassing Yusuf Demir's previous record.

He made his Austrian Football Bundesliga debut on 27 February 2022, replacing Alexander Prass during a 3–0 home win against TSV Hartberg.

Having fully become part of the professional squad during the 2022 pre-season, he took part in the Champions League qualifications games against Dynamo Kyiv, as the club from Graz failed to advance after extra-time.

=== Austria Wien ===
Wels signed with Austria Wien on 26 June 2023.

=== WSG Tirol ===
On 23 June 2025, Wels joined WSG Tirol on loan for the 2025–26 season.

On 3 September 2026, Wels signed permanently for WSG Tirol.

== International career ==
Moritz Wels is a youth international player for Austria, being part of all the Austrian selections up until the under-18, with whom he became a regular goalscorer, most notably netting a double against Sweden in October 2021.
