= Ramiz Harakaté =

French footballer (born 2002)

Personal information
- Date of birth: 13 July 2002 (age 24)
- Place of birth: Toulouse, France
- Height: 1.90 m (6 ft 3 in)
- Positions: Winger; forward

Team information
- Current team: LASK
- Number: 22

Youth career
- –2021: FC Montfermeil

Senior career*
Years	Team	Apps	(Gls)
2021–2023	Stade Briochin	1	(0)
2021–2023	→ Stade Briochin B (loan)	36	(7)
2023	C'Chartres Football	14	(1)
2023–2024	Racing Club de France	17	(5)
2024–2025	SKN St. Pölten	29	(7)
2025–2026	Grazer AK	30	(11)
2026–	LASK	0	(0)
- * Club domestic league appearances and goals as of 14 August 2026

Ramiz Harakaté (born 13 July 2002) is a French professional footballer who plays as a winger or forward for Austrian Bundesliga club LASK.

== Early life ==
Harakaté was born on 13 July 2002. Born in Toulouse, France, he is of Moroccan descent through his parents.

== Career ==
As a youth player, Harakaté joined the youth academy of French side FC Montfermeil. During the summer of 2021, he signed for French side Stade Briochin, where he made one league appearance and scored zero goals. Three years later, he signed for French side C'Chartres Football, where he made fourteen league appearances and scored one goal.

Following his stint there, he signed for French side Racing Club de France, where he made seventeen league appearances and scored five goals. One year later, he signed for Austrian side SKN St. Pölten, where he made twenty-nine league appearances and scored seven goals. Ahead of the 2025–26 season, he signed for Austrian side Grazer AK.

In the summer of 2026, Harakaté moved to LASK. In his debut in the Austrian Cup game, he suffered an ACL tear and was expected to miss an extensive period of time recovering.

== Style of play ==
Harakaté plays as a winger or forward. French newspaper Le Télégramme wrote in 2024 that he "is a natural dribbler, a space-devouring player, a lover of skillful moves and moments of inspiration".

== Career statistics ==
As of match played 25 July 2026

Appearances and goals by club, season and competition
Club	Season	League			Cup		Europe		Other		Total	
Club	Season	Division	Apps	Goals	Apps	Goals	Apps	Goals	Apps	Goals	Apps	Goals
Stade Briochin	2021–22	Ligue 3	1	0	—		—		—		1	0
Stade Briochin B (loan)	2021–22	National 2	25	4	—		—		—		25	4
Stade Briochin B (loan)	2022–23	National 2	11	3	—		—		—		11	3
Stade Briochin B (loan)	Total		36	7	—		—		—		36	7
C'Chartres Football	2022–23	National 1	14	1	—		—		—		14	1
Racing Club de France	2023–24	National 1	17	5	4	1	—		—		21	6
SKN St. Pölten	2024–25	2. Liga	29	7	1	0	—		—		30	7
Grazer AK	2025–26	Austrian Bundesliga	0	0	1	0	—		—		1	0
Career total			97	20	6	1	0	0	0	0	103	21
