= Dominik Frieser =

Austrian association football player

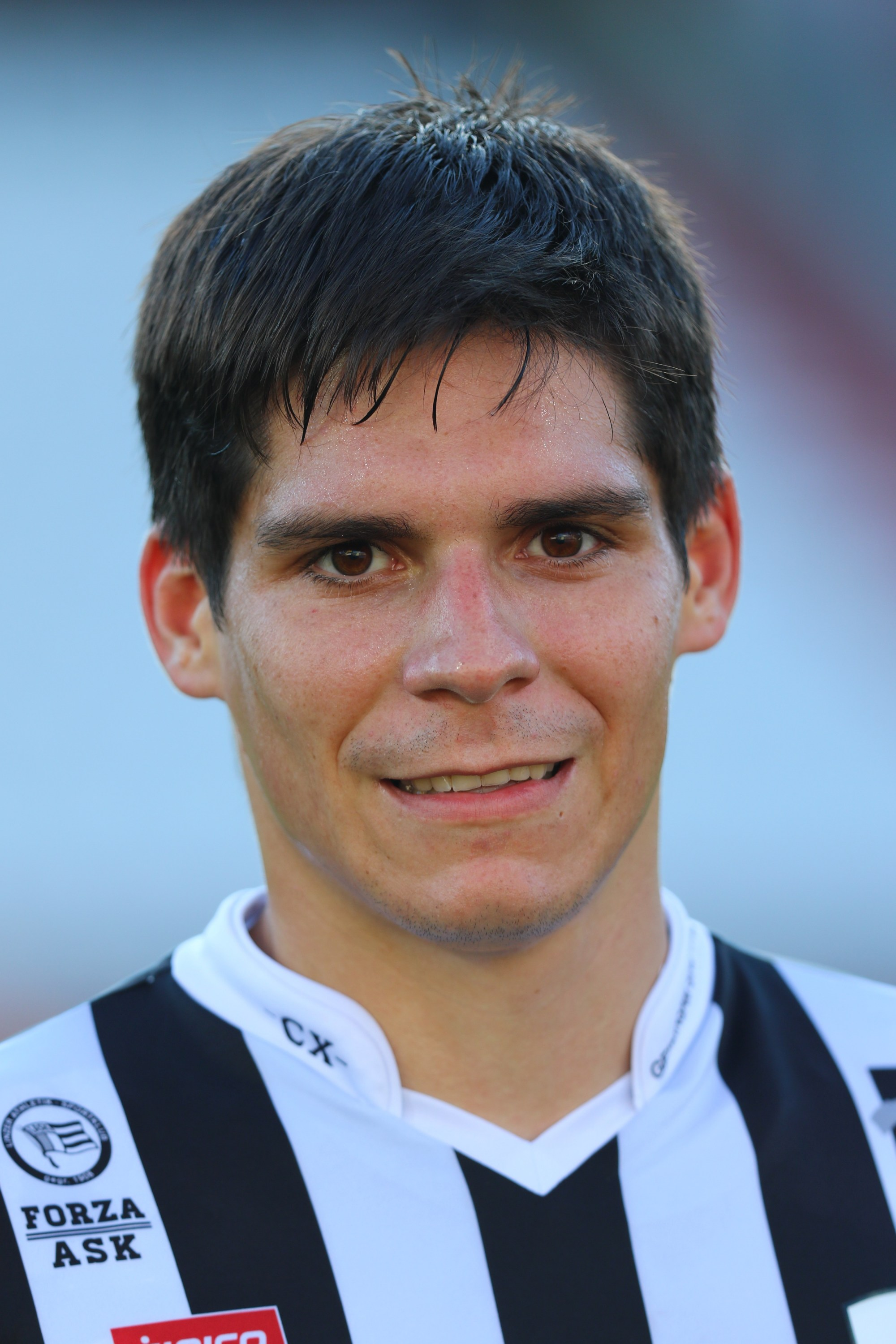
- Frieser in 2018

Personal information
- Full name: Dominik Frieser
- Date of birth: 9 September 1993 (age 33)
- Place of birth: Graz, Austria
- Height: 1.76 m (5 ft 9 in)
- Position: Midfielder

Team information
- Current team: Blau-Weiß Linz
- Number: 28

Senior career*
Years	Team	Apps	(Gls)
2013–2015	Hartberg	37	(1)
2014	→ SC Kalsdorf (loan)	14	(1)
2015–2017	Kapfenberger SV	69	(12)
2017–2018	Wolfsberger AC	22	(9)
2018–2020	LASK	61	(14)
2020–2021	Barnsley	56	(5)
2022	Cesena	16	(1)
2022–2024	Hartberg	59	(4)
2024–2026	Grazer AK	56	(1)
2026–	Blau-Weiß Linz	3	(0)
- * Club domestic league appearances and goals as of 14 August 2026

Dominik Frieser (born 9 September 1993) is an Austrian professional footballer who plays as a midfielder for 2. Liga club Blau-Weiß Linz.

== Career ==
Frieser joined EFL Championship side Barnsley on 20 August 2020 after previously playing in Austria with Hartberg, Kapfenberger SV, Wolfsberger AC and LASK Linz. He scored his first goal for Barnsley in a 2–2 draw with Stoke City on 21 October 2020. In the same match he was adjudged by the referee's assistant to have been elbowed in the face by Stoke City player Nathan Collins and was shown lying on the ground clutching his face. Collins was shown a red card by the referee for violent conduct and dismissed from the field of play. After an appeal on 22 October Collins' red card and subsequent 3 match ban was rescinded.

On 1 February 2022, Frieser signed a contract with Italian club Cesena until 30 June 2024.

On 30 August 2022, he returned to Hartberg on a three-year contract.

On 29 May 2024, Frieser signed a two-year deal with Grazer AK.

== Career statistics ==
As of match played 28 May 2024

Appearances and goals by club, season and competition
Club	Season	League			Cup		League Cup		Other		Total	
Club	Season	Division	Apps	Goals	Apps	Goals	Apps	Goals	Apps	Goals	Apps	Goals
Hartberg	2013–14	Austrian First League	7	0	0	0	—		—		7	0
Hartberg	2014–15	Austrian First League	30	1	3	0	—		—		33	1
Hartberg	Total		37	1	3	0	—		—		40	1
Kalsdorf (loan)	2013–14	Austrian Regionalliga	14	1	—		—		—		14	1
Kapfenberger SV	2015–16	Austrian First League	35	5	2	0	—		—		37	5
Kapfenberger SV	2016–17	Austrian First League	34	2	4	1	—		—		38	3
Kapfenberger SV	Total		69	7	6	1	—		—		75	8
Wolfsberger AC	2017–18	Austrian Bundesliga	22	4	1	0	—		—		23	4
LASK Linz	2018–19	Austrian Bundesliga	31	6	4	0	—		4 (Note: Appearances in UEFA Europa League)	2	39	8
LASK Linz	2019–20	Austrian Bundesliga	30	8	4	3	—		14 (Note: Four appearances in UEFA Champions League and ten in UEFA Europa League)	2	48	13
LASK Linz	Total		64	14	8	3	—		18	4	90	21
Barnsley	2020–21	EFL Championship	42	3	3	0	3	0	1 (Note: Appearance in Championship Play-offs)	0	49	3
Barnsley	2021–22	EFL Championship	14	2	0	0	0	0	—		14	2
Barnsley	Total		56	5	3	0	3	0	1	0	63	5
Cesena	2021–22	Serie C	16	1	0	0	—		—		16	1
TSV Hartberg	2022–23	Austrian Bundesliga	27	1	0	0	—		—		27	1
TSV Hartberg	2023–24	Austrian Bundesliga	32	3	2	0	—		—		34	3
TSV Hartberg	Total		59	4	2	0	—		—		61	4
Career total			296	34	20	4	1	0	18	4	335	42
