= Tim Paumgartner =

Austrian footballer (born 2005)

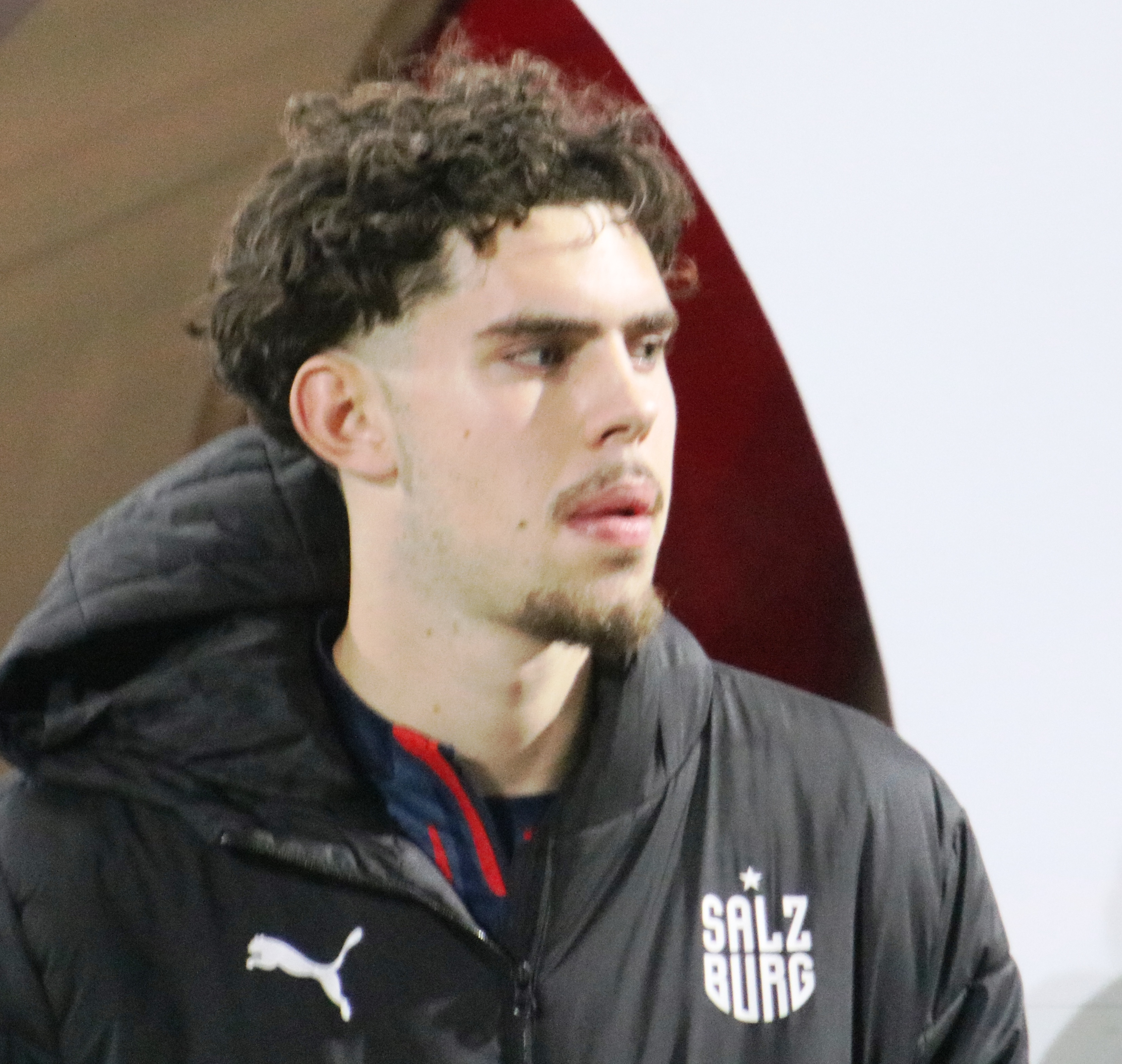
- Paumgartner with Red Bull Salzburg in 2025

Personal information
- Full name: Tim Aziz Paumgartner
- Date of birth: 5 March 2005 (age 21)
- Place of birth: Salzburg, Austria
- Height: 1.96 m (6 ft 5 in)
- Position: Midfielder

Team information
- Current team: SV Grödig

Youth career
- 2013—2014: ASVÖ FC Puch
- 2014—2017: SV Kuchl
- 2017–: Red Bull Salzburg

Senior career*
Years	Team	Apps	(Gls)
2021–2025	FC Liefering	55	(4)
2025–2026	Grazer AK	6	(0)
2026–	SV Grödig	4	(0)

International career^{‡}
2022–2023	Austria U18	6	(0)
2025	Austria U21	1	(0)
- * Club domestic league appearances and goals as of 15 August 2026 ‡ National team caps and goals as of 21 March 2025

Tim Aziz Paumgartner (born 5 March 2005) is an Austrian professional footballer who plays as a midfielder for Regionalliga club SV Grödig.

== Club career ==
Tim Paumgartner made his professional debut for FC Liefering on the 15 October 2021, replacing Justin Omoregie during a 2–0 home 2. Liga win against Juniors OÖ.

While playing for FC Liefering in Austria second tier – as their youngest player that season – Paumgartner was a regular starter for Red Bull Salzburg's under-19, notably for their Youth League campaign, as they topped their group stage.

On 21 June 2025, Paumgartner joined Grazer AK, signing an initial two-year contract, with an option for a third year.
