= Murat Şatin =

Austrian footballer

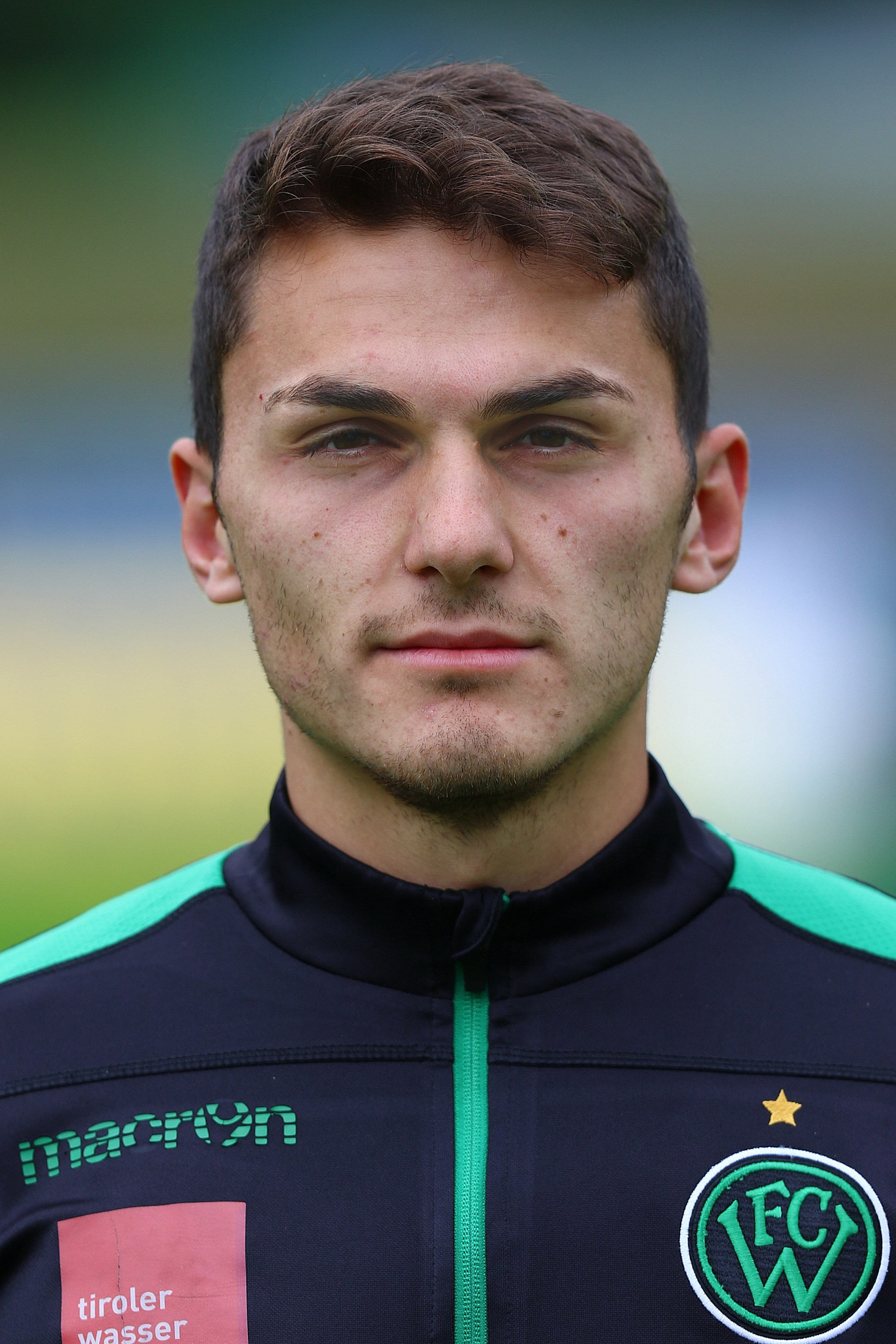
- Şatin with Wacker Innsbruck in 2018

Personal information
- Date of birth: 30 August 1996 (age 30)
- Place of birth: Innsbruck, Austria
- Height: 1.77 m (5 ft 10 in)
- Position: Midfielder

Team information
- Current team: WSG Tirol
- Number: 11

Youth career
- 2003–2006: SSV Neustift
- 2006–2008: Wacker Innsbruck
- 2008–2010: Innsbrucker AC
- 2010–2014: Akademie Tirol
- 2014: Gençlerbirliği

Senior career*
Years	Team	Apps	(Gls)
2015–2017	Hacettepe	53	(0)
2017–2019	Wacker Innsbruck II	37	(8)
2017–2020	Wacker Innsbruck	42	(7)
2020–2022	SV Ried	40	(1)
2022–2023	Vorwärts Steyr	12	(3)
2023–2024	SW Bergenz	15	(5)
2024–2026	Grazer AK	70	(3)
2026–	WSG Tirol	2	(0)
- * Club domestic league appearances and goals as of 7 August 2026

Murat Şatin (born 30 August 1996) is an Austrian footballer who plays for WSG Tirol in Austrian Football Bundesliga. He has a Turkish background.

== Club career ==
On 11 August 2020 he signed a two-year contract with SV Ried.
