= 2025–26 FK Austria Wien season =

FK Austria Wien
2025–26 season
- Manager: Stephan Helm
- Stadium: Franz Horr Stadium
- Austrian Football Bundesliga: 4th
- Austrian Cup: First round
- UEFA Conference League: Third qualifying round
- Top goalscorer: League: Johannes Eggestein (9); All: Johannes Eggestein (10)
- Highest home attendance: 15,600 (vs. SK Rapid Wien, 15 February 2026)
- Lowest home attendance: 8,951 (vs. Spaeri, 24 July 2025)
- Average home league attendance: 13,535
- Biggest win: 5–0 (vs. Spaeri, 31 July 2025)
- Biggest defeat: 3–0 (vs. Red Bull Salzburg, 26 October 2025); 5–2 (vs. SK Sturm Graz, 15 March 2026); 4–1 (vs. LASK, 5 April 2026); 3–0 (vs. LASK, 17 May 2026)
Home colours	Away colours

The 2025–26 season was the 114th season in the history of FK Austria Wien, and the club's 81st consecutive season in the Austrian Football Bundesliga. In addition to the domestic league, the team participated in the Austrian Cup and the UEFA Conference League.

== Transfers ==
=== In ===
Pos.	Player	Transferred from	Fee	Date	Source
FW	(Germany) Maurice Malone	(Switzerland) Basel	€1.2m	21 May 2025	
FW	(Ghana) Kelvin Boateng	(Austria) First Vienna	Free	3 June 2025	
MF	(South Korea) Lee Kang-hee	(South Korea) Gyeongnam	€426k	27 June 2025	
FW	(Austria) Manprit Sarkaria	(China) Shenzhen Peng City	Free	29 June 2025	
FW	(Australia) Noah Botić	(Australia) Western United	Free	29 June 2025	
FW	(Germany) Johannes Eggestein	(Germany) St. Pauli	Free	23 July 2025	
DF	(South Korea) Lee Tae-seok	(South Korea) Pohang Steelers	€800k	2 August 2025	
MF	(Senegal) Clauvis Etienne	(Brazil) Uberaba	Undisclosed	5 September 2025	

=== Out ===
Pos.	Player	Transferred to	Fee	Date	Source
DF	(Austria) Matteo Meisl	(Austria) Admira Wacker	Undisclosed	23 June 2025	
FW	(Austria) Moritz Wels	(Austria) WSG Tirol	Loan	23 June 2025	
FW	(Austria) Andreas Gruber	(Slovakia) Dunajská Streda	Free	25 June 2025	
MF	(Austria) Marvin Potzmann	(Austria) Bad Waltersdorf	Free	1 July 2025	
DF	(Austria) Tobias Polz	(Austria) Oberwart	Undisclosed	1 July 2025	
FW	(Austria) Muharem Huskovic	(Austria) Blau-Weiß Linz	Loan	1 July 2025	
FW	(Nigeria) David Ewemade	(Serbia) Radnički Niš	Free	8 July 2025	
FW	(Austria) Dario Kreiker	(Austria) SV Stripfing	Free	12 July 2025	
DF	(Brazil) Lucas Galvão	(United Arab Emirates) Hatta Club	Free	17 July 2025	
MF	(Austria) Dominik Fitz	(United States) Minnesota United	€2m	21 August 2025	
FW	(Germany) Maurice Malone	(Austria) SK Sturm Graz	€2m	2 September 2025	
FW	(Ivory Coast) Abdoulaye Kanté	(Austria) SV Stripfing	Loan	4 September 2025	
MF	(Senegal) Clauvis Etienne	(Austria) SV Stripfing	Loan	5 September 2025	
DF	(Austria) Luca Pazourek	(Austria) TSV Hartberg	Loan	6 January 2026	
FW	(Austria) Muharem Huskovic	(Bosnia and Herzegovina) Željezničar	Free	3 February 2026	

== Friendlies ==
5 July 2025 Friendly	Austria Wien	2–4	Bohemians	Vienna
10:00	Sarkaria 25'; Lee Kang-hee 86'		Matoušek 5', 20'; Zeman 109'; Drchal 124'	Stadium: Generali Arena

9 July 2025 Friendly	Austria Wien	0–0	FAC	Vienna
18:00				Stadium: Generali Arena

12 July 2025 Friendly	SC/ESV Parndorf	0–6	Austria Wien	Parndorf
14:30			Fitz 13'; Malone 27', 29'; Botić 34', 65'; Boateng 75'	Stadium: Heidebodenstadion

18 July 2025 Friendly	Austria Wien	1–2	Hertha Berlin	Vienna
18:00	Botić (yellow card) 39'; Sarkaria 52'; Raguž (penalty missed) 83'; Ranftl (yellow card) 85'		Eitschberger 38'; Krattenmacher (yellow card) 63'; Þorsteinsson 90+1'	Stadium: Generali Arena

10 January 2026 Friendly	Austria Wien	5–1	SR Donaufeld Wien	Vienna
10:00	Nisandzic 16'; Raguž 19' (pen.); Ilić 51'; Eggestein 62', 86'		Rezaie (yellow card) 15'; Mandl 34'	Stadium: Generali Arena

16 January 2026 Friendly	Austria Wien	2–4	Nordsjælland	Vienna
11:00	Eggestein 36' (pen.); Boateng 54'		Nene 15'; Rasmussen 52', 98'; Dalsgaard 104'	Stadium: Generali Arena

23 January 2026 Friendly	Austria Wien	Cancelled	Teplice	Vienna
12:00				Stadium: Generali Arena

26 January 2026 Friendly	Austria Wien	1–1	Dunajská Streda	Vienna
11:00	Raguž 76'		Kacharaba 90'	Stadium: Generali Arena

31 January 2026 Friendly	Austria Wien	2–0	Grazer AK	Vienna
12:00	Fischer 36'; Eggestein 39'			Stadium: Generali Arena

== Competitions ==
=== Overall record ===
Competition	First match	Last match	Starting round	Final position	Record							
Competition	First match	Last match	Starting round	Final position	Pld	W	D	L	GF	GA	GD	Win %
Austrian Football Bundesliga	3 August 2025		Matchday 1		31	14	5	12	45	47	−2	45.16
Austrian Cup	27 July 2025		First round	First Round	1	0	0	1	2	3	−1	0.00
UEFA Conference League	24 July 2025	14 August 2025	Second qualifying round	Third qualifying round	4	2	1	1	11	4	+7	50.00
Total					36	16	6	14	58	54	+4	44.44

Source: Soccerway

=== Austrian Football Bundesliga ===
==== League table ====
Pos	Team	Pld	W	D	L	GF	GA	GD	Pts	Qualification
2	Red Bull Salzburg	22	10	7	5	42	26	+16	37	Qualification for the Championship round
3	LASK	22	11	4	7	32	30	+2	37	Qualification for the Championship round
4	Austria Wien	22	11	3	8	34	30	+4	36	Qualification for the Championship round
5	SK Rapid	22	9	6	7	26	25	+1	33	Qualification for the Championship round
6	TSV Hartberg	22	8	9	5	29	24	+5	33	Qualification for the Championship round

Source: Austrian Football Bundesliga
Rules for classification: 1) Points; 2) Head-to-head record; 3) Goal difference; 4) Goals scored; 5) Matches won; 6) Away matches won; 7) Away goals scored.

==== Results summary ====
Overall								Home						Away					
Pld	W	D	L	GF	GA	GD	Pts	W	D	L	GF	GA	GD	W	D	L	GF	GA	GD
31	14	5	12	45	47	−2	47	6	3	6	19	24	−5	8	2	6	26	23	+3

Source: ADMIRAL Bundesliga

==== Results by round ====
Round	1
Ground	
Result	
Position	

Source: ADMIRAL Bundesliga
A = Away; H = Home; W = Win; D = Draw; L = Loss

==== Matches ====
3 August 2025 1	Grazer AK	2–2	Austria Wien	Graz
17:00 CET	Harakaté 22'; Cipot 55'	Report	Sarkaria 43'; Fitz 87'	Stadium: Liebenauer Stadium; Attendance: 9,464; Referee: (Austria) Stefan Ebner

10 August 2025 2	Austria Wien	0–2	Wolfsberger AC	Wien
17:00 CET	Sarkaria (yellow card) 58'; Fitz (yellow card) 75'	Report	Schöpf 6'; K. Lee 23' (o.g.); Ballo (yellow card) 59'; Sulzner (yellow card) 90+7'	Stadium: Generali Arena; Attendance: 13,049; Referee: (Austria) Christian-Petru Ciochirca

17 August 2025 3	LASK	2–1	Austria Wien	Linz
17:00 CET	Adeniran 35'; Coulibaly (yellow card) 59'; Usor 69' (pen.); Daněk (yellow card) 90+7'	Report	Cissé 6' (o.g.); Barry (yellow card) 20'; T. Lee (yellow card) 38'; Ranftl (yellow card) 67'; Fischer (yellow card) 79'; Wiesinger (yellow card) 85'; Plavotić (yellow card) 86'	Stadium: Raiffeisen Arena; Attendance: 12,510; Referee: (Austria) Alexander Harkam

24 August 2025 4	Austria Wien	1–3	TSV Hartberg	Wien
17:00 CET	Barry (yellow card) 37'; Ranftl (yellow card) 65'; Coulibaly 90+3' (o.g.)	Report	Havel 12'; Mijić 63'; Fridrikas 73'; Spendlhofer (yellow card) 75'	Stadium: Generali Arena; Attendance: 11,877; Referee: (Austria) Sebastian Gishamer

31 August 2025 5	Austria Wien	1–0	SCR Altach	Wien
17:00 CET	Radonjić 57'	Report	Jäger (yellow card) 68'; Bähre (yellow card) 77'	Stadium: Generali Arena; Attendance: 13,569; Referee: (Austria) Stefan Ebner

14 September 2025 6	SK Sturm Graz	0–1	Austria Wien	Graz
17:00 CET	Chukwuani (yellow card) 51'; Grgić (yellow card) 79'	Report	Eggestein 22'; Barry (yellow card) 45+1'; Šaljić (yellow card) 69'; Fischer (yellow card) 81'	Stadium: Liebenauer Stadium; Attendance: 16,183; Referee: (Austria) Markus Hameter

20 September 2025 7	Austria Wien	3–2	SV Ried	Wien
17:00 CET	Barry 49', (yellow card) 65'; Eggestein 77' (pen.); Fischer 85'; Raguž (yellow card) 90+4'	Report	Mutandwa 22', 45+2', (yellow card) 78'; Mayer (yellow card) 55'; Havenaar (yellow card) 58'; Grosse (yellow card) 62'	Stadium: Generali Arena; Attendance: 12,029; Referee: (Austria) Alexander Harkam

28 September 2025 8	SK Rapid Wien	1–3	Austria Wien	Wien
17:00 CET	Mbuyi 48' (pen.); Kara (yellow card) 71'	Report	T. Lee 25'; Barry (yellow card) 36', (goal) 50'; Botić 59'; Wiesinger (red card) 73'	Stadium: Allianz Stadion; Attendance: 26,000; Referee: (Austria) Walter Altmann

4 October 2025 9	Austria Wien	0–1	Blau-Weiß Linz	Wien
17:00 CET		Report	Goiginger (yellow card) 43'; Maranda (yellow card) 71'; Weissman 79' (pen.); Varesi-Strauss (yellow card) 86'	Stadium: Generali Arena; Attendance: 12,815; Referee: (Austria) Daniel Pfister

18 October 2025 10	WSG Tirol	2–3	Austria Wien	Innsbruck
17:00 CET	Wels 45'; Müller 69'; Boras (yellow card) 80'; Baden Frederiksen (yellow card) 87'; Hinterseer (red card) 90+5'	Report	Botić 2', 24'; T. Lee (yellow card) 45+2'; Eggestein 55'; Wiesinger (yellow card) 80'; Şahin-Radlinger (yellow card) 90+5'	Stadium: Tivoli Stadion Tirol; Attendance: 1,670; Referee: (Austria) Markus Greinecker

26 October 2025 11	Austria Wien	0–3	Red Bull Salzburg	Wien
17:00 CET	Pazourek (yellow card) 78'	Report	Kitano 8'; Alajbegović 16'; Trummer 56'; Ratkov (yellow card) 89'	Stadium: Generali Arena; Attendance: 14,483; Referee: (Austria) Walter Altmann

1 November 2025 12	TSV Hartberg	2–1	Austria Wien	Hartberg
17:00 CET	Vincze 14'; Havel 16'; Heil (yellow card) 45+2'	Report	T. Lee (yellow card) 44'; Dragović (yellow card) 54'; Wiesinger 74'; K. Lee (yellow card) 90+5'	Stadium: Profertil Arena Hartberg; Attendance: 4,273; Referee: (Austria) Sebastian Gishamer

8 November 2025 13	Austria Wien	2–1	Grazer AK	Wien
17:00 CET	Dragović (yellow card) 7'; Plavotić 24'; Wiesinger (yellow card) 67'; Radonjić (yellow card) 75'; Raguž 90+1'	Report	Maderner 53', (yellow card) 67'; Jano (yellow card) 58'; Schriebl (yellow card) 86'; Harakaté (yellow card) 90+4'	Stadium: Generali Arena; Attendance: 12,307; Referee: (Austria) Harald Lechner

22 November 2025 14	Blau-Weiß Linz	2–3	Austria Wien	Linz
17:00 CET	Seidl 20', 76'; Pašić (yellow card) 80'	Report	Sarkaria 13', 52'; Eggestein 45+1' (pen.); Ranftl (yellow card) 59'	Stadium: Donauparkstadion; Attendance: 5,557; Referee: (Austria) Alexander Harkam

29 November 2025 15	Austria Wien	0–0	WSG Tirol	Wien
17:00 CET	K. Lee (yellow card) 45'; Barry (yellow card) 49'	Report	Boras (yellow card) 49'; Naschberger (yellow card) 90+3'	Stadium: Generali Arena; Attendance: 13,024; Referee: (Austria) Jakob Semler

7 December 2025 16	Wolfsberger AC	2–1	Austria Wien	Wolfsberg
14:30 CET	Avdijaj 16'; Schöpf 21'; Nwaiwu (yellow card) 55' (yellow-red card) 60'; Piesinger (yellow card) 90+3'	Report	Wiesinger (yellow card) 51'; Plavotić (yellow card) 62'; T. Lee 72'	Stadium: Lavanttal-Arena; Attendance: 3,565; Referee: (Austria) Markus Greinecker

14 December 2025 17	Austria Wien	3–1	SK Sturm Graz	Wien
17:00 CET	Ranftl 19'; Eggestein 37' (pen.); Barry (yellow card) 74'; Wiesinger (yellow card) 81'; Boateng 90+8'	Report	Malić 7'; Jatta (yellow card) 45+6'; Kiteishvili (yellow card) 90+6'	Stadium: Generali Arena; Attendance: 13,555; Referee: (Austria) Arnes Talic

6 February 2026 18	Red Bull Salzburg	0–2	Austria Wien	Wals-Siezenheim
20:30 CET		Report	Barry 21'; Eggestein 24'; Handl (yellow card) 90'	Stadium: Red Bull Arena; Attendance: 10,789; Referee: (Austria) Harald Lechner

15 February 2026 19	Austria Wien	2–0	SK Rapid Wien	Wien
17:00 CET	Eggestein 15'; Ranftl 35'; T. Lee (yellow card) 83'	Report	Grgić (yellow card) 55'; Nunoo (yellow card) 74'; Kara (yellow card) 75'	Stadium: Generali Arena; Attendance: 15,600; Referee: (Austria) Markus Hameter

21 February 2026 20	SCR Altach	2–1	Austria Wien	Altach
17:00 CET	Milojević 31'; Ouédraogo 34'; Jäger (yellow card) 90+4'	Report	Eggestein 33', (yellow card) 90+4'; Barry (yellow card) 63'; Wiesinger (yellow card) 80'; Handl (yellow card) 90+4'	Stadium: Stadion Schnabelholz; Attendance: 3,655; Referee: (Austria) Jakob Semler

1 March 2026 21	Austria Wien	2–2	LASK	Wien
17:00 CET	Plavotić (yellow card) 6'; Wiesinger (yellow card) 41'; Dragović 47'; Fischer (yellow card) 53'; Eggestein 88' (pen.)	Report	Usor 24'; Lang 72'	Stadium: Generali Arena; Attendance: 14,165; Referee: (Austria) Arnes Talic

8 March 2026 22	SV Ried	0–2	Austria Wien	Ried im Innkreis
17:00 CET	Rossdorfer (yellow card) 67'	Report	Dragović (yellow card) 41', (goal) 73'; Barry 56'; T. Lee (yellow card) 77'; Marković (yellow card) 90+4'	Stadium: Josko Arena; Attendance: 5,768; Referee: (Austria) Alexander Harkam

==== League table ====
Pos	Team	Pld	W	D	L	GF	GA	GD	Pts	Qualification
2	Sturm Graz	32	16	8	8	51	35	+16	37	Qualification for the Champions League second qualifying round
3	Red Bull Salzburg	32	13	9	10	56	41	+15	29	Qualification for the Europa League third qualifying round (Note: The 2025–26 Austrian Cup winners (LASK) qualified for the Europa League third qualifying round. Since LASK finished as league champions, the Europa League berth went to the third place team.)
4	Austria Wien	32	14	5	13	45	50	−5	29	Qualification for the Conference League second qualifying round
5	SK Rapid (O)	32	12	8	12	36	41	−5	27	Qualification for the Conference League play-offs
6	Hartberg	32	10	12	10	40	40	0	25	

Source: Austrian Football Bundesliga
Rules for classification: 1) Points; 2) Points with (possible) half points subtracted due to rounding; 3) Head-to-head points; 4) Head-to-head goal difference; 5) Head-to-head goals scored; 6) Goal difference; 7) Goals scored; 8) Matches won; 9) Away matches won; 10) Away goals scored.
(O) Play-off winners

==== Matches ====
15 March 2026 23	Austria Wien	2–5	SK Sturm Graz	Wien
17:00 CET	Schablas 1'; Barry (yellow card) 30'; Plavotić (yellow card) 43' (yellow-red card) 55'; Wiesinger (yellow card) 70'; Fischer 84'; Handl (yellow card) 89'; Dragović (yellow card) 90+3'	Report	Rózga 7', (yellow card) 56'; Kiteishvili 45+1', 56' (pen.); Fosso 60'; Dragović 67' (o.g.); Koller (red card) 74'	Stadium: Generali Arena; Attendance: 13,942; Referee: (Austria) Walter Altmann

22 March 2026 24	TSV Hartberg	0–1	Austria Wien	Hartberg
14:30 CET	Schopp (red card) 38'	Report	K. Lee (yellow card) 1'; Fischer 45+1'; T. Lee (yellow card) 49'; Marković (yellow card) 57'; Mörth (yellow card) 64'; Handl (yellow card) 71'	Stadium: Profertil Arena Hartberg; Attendance: 4,021; Referee: (Austria) Stefan Ebner

5 April 2026 25	LASK	4–1	Austria Wien	Linz
14:30 CET	Cissé 4'; Jørgensen 12'; Usor 13'; Kalajdžić 32'	Report	Plavotić (red card) 11'; T. Lee 16'	Stadium: Raiffeisen Arena; Attendance: 12,849; Referee: (Austria) Jakob Semler

12 April 2026 26	Austria Wien	1–1	SK Rapid Wien	Wien
17:00 CET	Marković (yellow card) 20'; Boateng 34'; Şahin-Radlinger (yellow card) 43'	Report	Wurmbrand (yellow card) 43'; Kara 83'; Horn (yellow card) 87'	Stadium: Generali Arena; Attendance: 14,171; Referee: (Austria) Harald Lechner

19 April 2026 27	Austria Wien	1–3	Red Bull Salzburg	Wien
14:30 CET	Saljić (yellow card) 35'; Boateng (yellow card) 62', (goal) 62'	Report	Alajbegović 4'; Kjærgaard (yellow card) 14'; Konaté 29'; Lainer (yellow card) 45+1'; Krätzig (yellow card) 50'; Onisiwo 77'; Yeo (yellow card) 86'	Stadium: Generali Arena; Attendance: 14,543; Referee: (Austria) Markus Hameter

22 April 2026 28	Red Bull Salzburg	3–1	Austria Wien	Wals-Siezenheim
18:30 CET	Kjærgaard (yellow card) 7'; Vertessen 17'; Schuster 23'; Alajbegović (yellow card) 71'; Şahin-Radlinger 76' (o.g.)	Report	Ranftl 35'; Maybach (yellow card) 41'; K. Lee (yellow card) 78'; Plavotić (yellow card) 90'	Stadium: Red Bull Arena; Attendance: 9,773; Referee: (Austria) Harald Lechner

26 April 2026 29	SK Sturm Graz	1–1	Austria Wien	Graz
17:00 CET	Kayombo (yellow card) 70'; Koller 85'; Gazibegović (yellow card) 90+6'	Report	Plavotić 54'; Boateng (yellow card) 80'; Eggestein (yellow card) 90+2'	Stadium: Merkur-Arena; Attendance: 15,979; Referee: (Austria) Stefan Ebner

3 May 2026 30	Austria Wien	1–0	TSV Hartberg	Wien
14:30 CET	Barry (yellow card) 65'; Boateng 69'	Report		Stadium: Generali Arena; Attendance: 13,900; Referee: (Austria) Sebastian Gishamer

10 May 2026 31	SK Rapid Wien	0–2	Austria Wien	Wien
17:00 CET		Report	Saljić 9'; Ranftl (yellow card) 19'; Dragović (yellow card) 27'; Raux-Yao 60' (o.g.)	Stadium: Allianz Stadion; Attendance: 25,522; Referee: (Austria) Julian Weinberger

17 May 2026 32	Austria Wien	0–3	LASK	Wien
14:30 CET	Barry (yellow card) 44'; Handl (yellow card) 60'	Report	Mbuyamba 38'; Adeniran 49' (pen.); Bello (yellow card) 59'; Bogarde 76'	Stadium: Generali Arena; Referee: (Austria) Sebastian Gishamer

=== Austrian Cup ===
27 July 2025 First round	ASK Voitsberg	3–2	Austria Wien	Voitsberg
13:00	Pfingstner 23', (yellow card) 89'; Zivanovic 63'; Krienzer 65'; Scheucher (yellow card) 74'; Suppan (yellow card) 79'	Report	Plavotić (yellow card) 6'; Fischer (yellow card) 39'; Botić 45+1'; Malone 57'; K. Lee (yellow card) 73'; Ranftl (yellow card) 88'	Stadium: Stadion Voitsberg; Attendance: 2,500; Referee: Achim Untergasser

=== UEFA Conference League ===
==== Second qualifying round ====
The draw was held on 18 June 2025.

24 July 2025 First leg	Austria Wien	2–0	(Georgia (country)) Spaeri	Vienna
19:30 UTC+1	Fischer 8'; Fitz 90+1'	Report	Samkharadze (yellow card) 60'; Gegiadze (yellow card) 90+4'	Stadium: Franz Horr Stadium; Attendance: 8,951; Referee: Martin Dohal (Slovakia)

31 July 2025 Second leg	Spaeri (Georgia (country))	0–5 (0–7 agg.)	Austria Wien	Tbilisi, Georgia
17:30 UTC+3	Bunturi (yellow card) 9'; Chagunava (yellow card) 38'; Gegiadze (yellow card) 75'; Kobakhidze (yellow card) 79'	Report	Barry (yellow card) 19'; Plavotić 40'; Fitz 43'; Malone 45+2' (pen.), 55'; Eggestein 72'; K. Lee (yellow card) 73'	Stadium: M. Meskhi II Stadium; Attendance: 916; Referee: Ashot Ghaltakhchyan (Armenia)

==== Third qualifying round ====
The draw was held on 21 July 2025.

7 August 2025 First leg	Baník Ostrava (Czech Republic)	4–3	Austria Wien	Ostrava, Czechia
17:30 UTC+1	Kohút 36'; Buchta 45'; Holzer 49'; Boula (yellow card) 74'; Prekop 82'	Report	Malone 4'; Fischer (yellow card) 27'; K. Lee (yellow card) 54'; Fitz 67'; Sarkaria 79'; Schablas (yellow card) 81'	Stadium: Městský stadion Attendance: 12,567; Referee: Mohammed Al-Hakim (Sweden)

14 August 2025 Second leg	Austria Wien	1–1 (4–5 agg.)	(Czech Republic) Baník Ostrava	Vienna
20:00 UTC+1	Wiesinger (yellow card) 39', (goal) 67'; Guenouche (yellow card) 58'; Fischer (yellow card) 84'; Plavotić (yellow card) 90+6'	Report	Prekop 45+1'; Holzer (yellow card) 53'; Kpozo (yellow card) 83'; Látal (yellow card) 90+4'; Holec (yellow card) 90+6'	Stadium: Franz Horr Stadium; Attendance: 10,022; Referee: Juxhin Xhaja (Albania)

=== Appearances and goals ===
As of match played 17 May 2026

Players with no appearances are not included on the list
Italics indicate a loaned in player

No.	Pos	Nat	Player	Total		Bundesliga		Austrian Cup		UEFA Conference League	
No.	Pos	Nat	Player	Apps	Goals	Apps	Goals	Apps	Goals	Apps	Goals
1	GK	(Austria) AUT	Samuel Şahin-Radlinger	36	0	32+0	0	0+0	0	4+0	0
5	MF	(The Gambia) GAM	Abubakr Barry	33	4	27+1	4	0+1	0	4+0	0
6	MF	(Austria) AUT	Philipp Maybach	23	0	15+8	0	0+0	0	0+0	0
7	FW	(Austria) AUT	Romeo Vučić	5	0	0+5	0	0+0	0	0+0	0
9	FW	(Australia) AUS	Noah Botić	18	4	6+7	3	1+0	1	1+3	0
11	FW	(Austria) AUT	Manprit Sarkaria	19	4	11+4	3	1+0	0	1+2	1
14	FW	(Ghana) GHA	Kelvin Boateng	22	4	4+16	4	0+1	0	0+1	0
15	DF	(Austria) AUT	Aleksandar Dragović	32	2	28+0	2	1+0	0	3+0	0
16	MF	(South Korea) KOR	Lee Kang-hee	27	0	17+5	0	0+1	0	4+0	0
17	MF	(South Korea) KOR	Lee Tae-seok	30	3	29+1	3	0+0	0	0+0	0
19	FW	(Germany) GER	Johannes Eggestein	33	10	27+2	9	0+1	0	2+1	1
20	MF	(Austria) AUT	Sanel Šaljić	25	1	14+8	1	0+0	0	0+3	0
21	MF	(France) FRA	Hakim Guenouche	8	0	2+2	0	0+0	0	4+0	0
22	MF	(Austria) AUT	Florian Wustinger	6	0	0+6	0	0+0	0	0+0	0
23	MF	(Austria) AUT	Konstantin Aleksa	4	0	0+4	0	0+0	0	0+0	0
24	DF	(Croatia) CRO	Tin Plavotić	30	3	21+4	2	1+0	0	3+1	1
26	MF	(Austria) AUT	Reinhold Ranftl	37	3	32+0	3	1+0	0	4+0	0
28	DF	(Austria) AUT	Philipp Wiesinger	32	2	28+1	1	0+0	0	2+1	1
29	FW	(Austria) AUT	Marko Raguž	11	1	0+10	1	0+1	0	0+0	0
30	MF	(Austria) AUT	Manfred Fischer	37	4	32+0	3	1+0	0	4+0	1
33	FW	(Austria) AUT	Marijan Österreicher	5	0	0+5	0	0+0	0	0+0	0
34	MF	(Austria) AUT	Romeo Mörth	2	0	0+2	0	0+0	0	0+0	0
36	MF	(Austria) AUT	Vasilije Markovic	13	0	4+9	0	0+0	0	0+0	0
40	MF	(Austria) AUT	Matteo Schablas	12	1	1+7	1	1+0	0	0+3	0
46	DF	(Austria) AUT	Johannes Handl	20	0	6+11	0	1+0	0	0+2	0
47	FW	(Ivory Coast) CIV	Abdoulaye Kanté	2	0	0+2	0	0+0	0	0+0	0
60	DF	(Austria) AUT	Dejan Radonjić	14	1	8+6	1	0+0	0	0+0	0
66	DF	(Austria) AUT	Ifeanyi Ndukwe	1	0	0+1	0	0+0	0	0+0	0
70	MF	(Austria) AUT	Dominik Nisandzic	1	0	0+1	0	0+0	0	0+0	0
99	GK	(Austria) AUT	Mirko Kos	1	0	0+0	0	1+0	0	0+0	0
Player(s) who featured whilst on loan but returned to parent club during the season:
Player(s) who featured but departed the club permanently during the season:
36	FW	(Austria) AUT	Dominik Fitz	8	4	3+0	1	1+0	0	4+0	3
77	FW	(Germany) GER	Maurice Malone	10	4	4+1	0	1+0	1	4+0	3
Player(s) who featured but departed the club on loan during the season:
2	DF	(Austria) AUT	Luca Pazourek	8	0	1+6	0	0+0	0	0+1	0
