= List of Austrian football transfers winter 2025–26 =

This is a list of Austrian football transfers for the 2025–26 winter transfer window. Only transfers featuring Austrian Football Bundesliga are listed.

== Austrian Football Bundesliga ==
Note: Flags indicate national team as has been defined under FIFA eligibility rules. Players may hold more than one non-FIFA nationality.

=== Sturm Graz ===
In:

No.	Pos.	Nation	Player
5	DF	AUT	Albert Vallçi (from (Switzerland) St. Gallen)
9	FW	SCO	Rory Wilson (on loan from (England) Aston Villa)
15	MF	GEO	Gizo Mamageishvili (from (Georgia (country)) Iberia 1999)
30	DF	AUT	Paul Koller (from SCR Altach)
44	DF	BIH	Jusuf Gazibegović (on loan from (Germany) 1. FC Köln)
80	MF	SUI	Ryan Fosso (from (Netherlands) Fortuna Sittard)

Out:

No.	Pos.	Nation	Player
1	GK	DEN	Oliver Christensen (loan return to (Italy) Fiorentina)
5	DF	GER	Tim Oermann (loan return to (Germany) Bayer Leverkusen)
6	DF	AUT	Aleksandar Borković (to SKN St. Pölten)
19	MF	SVN	Tomi Horvat (to (England) Bristol City)
21	MF	DEN	Tochi Chukwuani (to (Scotland) Rangers)
22	MF	DEN	Julius Beck (on loan to (Sweden) Elfsborg)

=== Red Bull Salzburg ===
In:

No.	Pos.	Nation	Player
21	DF	GER	Tim Drexler (from (Germany) TSG Hoffenheim, previously on loan at (Germany) 1. FC Nürnberg)
24	FW	HUN	Damir Redzic (from (Slovakia) Dunajská Streda)

Out:

No.	Pos.	Nation	Player
2	DF	DEN	Jacob Rasmussen (to (Germany) 1. FC Kaiserslautern)
21	FW	SRB	Petar Ratkov (to (Italy) Lazio)
29	MF	FRA	Lucas Gourna-Douath (on loan to (France) Le Havre)
—	MF	ANG	Elione Fernandes Neto (to (Czech Republic) Hradec Králové, previously on loan at Liefering)

=== Austria Wien ===
In:

No.	Pos.	Nation	Player

Out:

No.	Pos.	Nation	Player
2	DF	AUT	Luca Pazourek (on loan to TSV Hartberg)
—	FW	AUT	Muharem Husković (to (Bosnia and Herzegovina) Željezničar, previously on loan at Blau-Weiß Linz)

=== Wolfsberg ===
In:

No.	Pos.	Nation	Player
23	MF	BIH	Emin Kujović (on loan from (Germany) 1. FC Köln)
24	FW	GER	Jessic Ngankam (on loan from (Germany) Eintracht Frankfurt)
70	DF	SRB	David Đurić (from (Serbia) Red Star Belgrade, previously on loan at (Serbia) Grafičar Beograd)

Out:

No.	Pos.	Nation	Player
24	FW	CIV	Mickael Dosso (on loan to (Qatar) Al-Khor)
27	DF	NGA	Chibuike Nwaiwu (to (Turkey) Trabzonspor)

=== Rapid Wien ===
In:

No.	Pos.	Nation	Player
22	MF	AUT	Yusuf Demir (from (Turkey) Galatasaray)
26	FW	AUT	Andreas Weimann (on loan from (England) Derby County)

Out:

No.	Pos.	Nation	Player
27	FW	AUT	Noah Bischof (to (Netherlands) Dordrecht)
49	FW	MNE	Andrija Radulović (on loan to (Israel) Hapoel Haifa)
—	FW	AUT	Furkan Dursun (to (Switzerland) Thun, previously on loan at SKN St. Pölten)

=== Blau-Weiß Linz ===
In:

No.	Pos.	Nation	Player
5	DF	SWE	Isak Dahlqvist (from (Sweden) Örgryte)
22	DF	AUT	David Riegler (from SKN St. Pölten)
26	MF	GUI	Cheick Condé (on loan from (Italy) Venezia)
58	GK	GER	Nico Mantl (on loan from (Portugal) Arouca)

Out:

No.	Pos.	Nation	Player
1	GK	CZE	Viktor Baier (loan return to (Czech Republic) Viktoria Plzeň)
22	DF	AUT	Marcel Schantl (free agent)
25	FW	AUT	Muharem Husković (loan return to Austria Wien)

=== LASK ===
In:

No.	Pos.	Nation	Player
3	DF	NED	Xavier Mbuyamba (from (Netherlands) Volendam)

Out:

No.	Pos.	Nation	Player
14	MF	KOS	Valon Berisha (to (Switzerland) Zürich)
19	FW	FRA	Lenny Pintor (to (Turkey) Eyüpspor)
23	FW	CPV	Bryan Teixeira (to (Lithuania) Žalgiris)
42	DF	AUT	Kevin Lebersorger (on loan to (Germany) BFC Dynamo)
—	FW	MNE	Filip Perović (on loan to SKN St. Pölten)

=== TSV Hartberg ===
In:

No.	Pos.	Nation	Player
2	DF	AUT	Luca Pazourek (on loan from Austria Wien)
27	DF	AUT	Konstantin Schopp (on loan from (Germany) Mainz 05)

Out:

No.	Pos.	Nation	Player
2	DF	NED	Björn Hardley (to (Netherlands) Dordrecht)
9	FW	CRO	Patrik Mijić (on loan to (Greece) Kifisia)
10	MF	AUT	Dominik Prokop (to (Bosnia and Herzegovina) Željezničar)
—	GK	AUT	Elias Scherf (to SCR Altach, previously on loan at SV Stripfing)

=== WSG Tirol ===
In:

No.	Pos.	Nation	Player

Out:

No.	Pos.	Nation	Player
33	MF	AUT	Florian Rieder (to Austria Salzburg)

=== Grazer AK ===
In:

No.	Pos.	Nation	Player
6	MF	LUX	Mathias Olesen (on loan from (Germany) Greuther Fürth)
11	MF	AUT	Mark Grosse (from SV Ried)
12	GK	AUT	Franz Stolz (on loan from (Italy) Genoa, previously on loan at (Romania) Rapid București)
32	DF	RUS	Leon Klassen (on loan from (Germany) Darmstadt 98)

Out:

No.	Pos.	Nation	Player
5	DF	GER	Petar Filipović (free agent)
6	MF	TOG	Sadik Fofana (to (Italy) Lecce)
11	MF	SVN	Tio Cipot (loan return to (Italy) Spezia)
—	DF	AUT	Marco Gantschnig (to First Vienna, previously on loan at Austria Klagenfurt)

=== SCR Altach ===
In:

No.	Pos.	Nation	Player
16	DF	SWE	Rassa Rahmani (from (Sweden) Landskrona)
21	FW	NGA	Precious Benjamin (on loan from (Germany) TSG Hoffenheim)
30	GK	AUT	Elias Scherf (from TSV Hartberg, previously on loan at SV Stripfing)

Out:

No.	Pos.	Nation	Player
12	DF	AUT	Leonardo Lukačević (to (Slovakia) Košice)
13	GK	AUT	Tino Casali (to (Germany) Rot-Weiss Essen)
15	DF	AUT	Paul Koller (to Sturm Graz)

=== SV Ried ===
In:

No.	Pos.	Nation	Player
19	MF	GER	Jussef Nasrawe (on loan from (Germany) Bayern Munich II)
47	MF	AUT	Evan Eghosa Aisowieren (from FAC)
—	GK	CZE	Matěj Čechal (on loan from Hertha Wels)

Out:

No.	Pos.	Nation	Player
10	MF	AUT	Mark Grosse (to Grazer AK)
11	FW	ESP	Ekain Azkune (loan return to (Spain) Bilbao Athletic)

== See also ==
- 2025–26 Austrian Football Bundesliga
