= 2025–26 FC Red Bull Salzburg season =

Red Bull Salzburg
2025–26 season
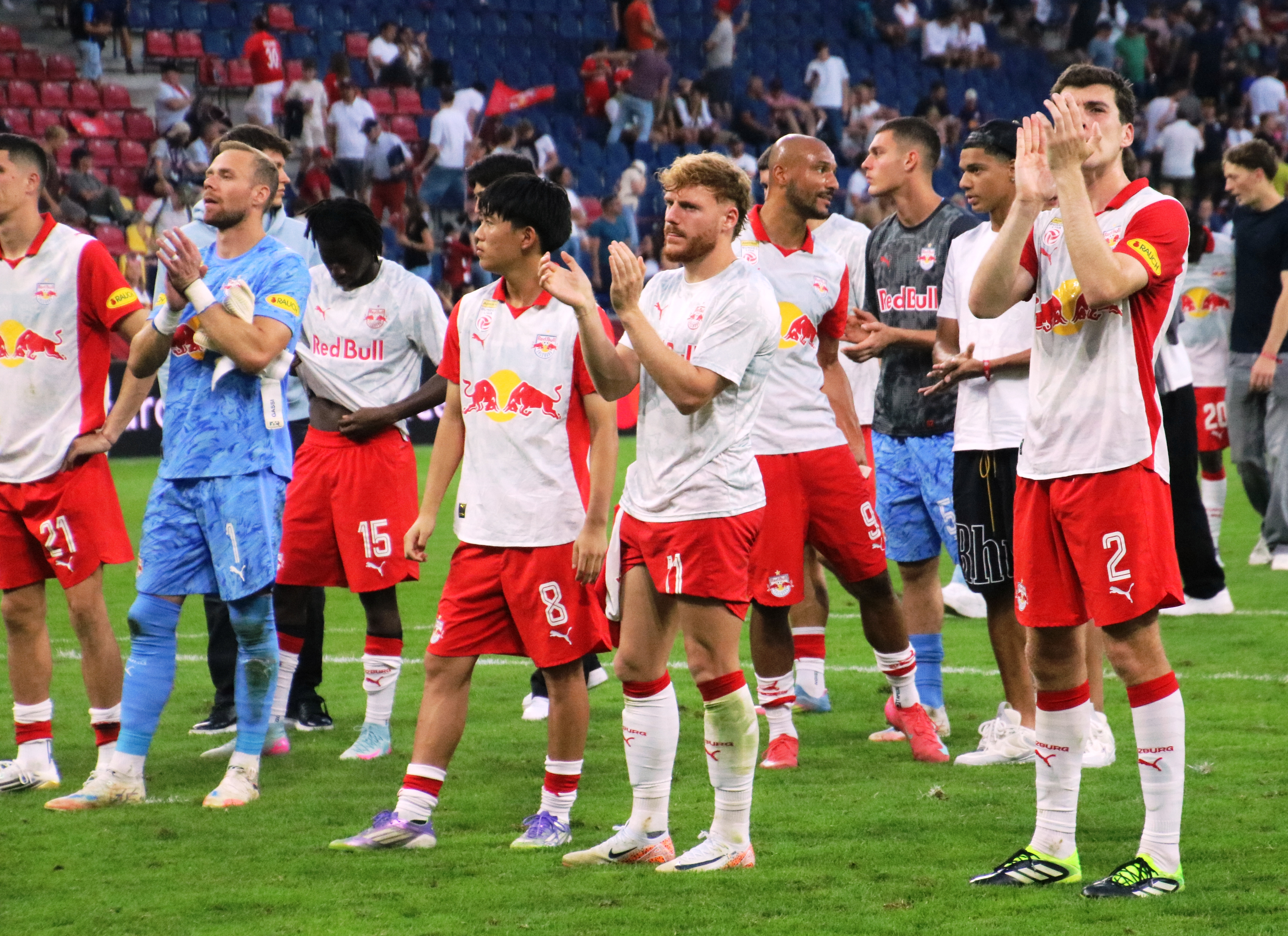
- Red Bull Salzburg players in September 2025
- Chairman: Harald Lürzer
- Head coach: Daniel Beichler
- Stadium: Red Bull Arena
- Bundesliga: 3rd
- Austrian Cup: Semi-finals
- UEFA Champions League: Third qualifying round
- UEFA Europa League: League phase
- Top goalscorer: League: Kerim Alajbegović; Petar Ratkov (9 each); All: Kerim Alajbegović; Yorbe Vertessen (13 each)
- Highest home attendance: 10,938 vs LASK, 23 August 2025, Bundesliga
- Lowest home attendance: 6,123 vs WSG Tirol, 23 November 2025, Bundesliga
- Average home league attendance: 11,412
- Biggest win: 5–0 vs Grazer AK, 9 August 2025, Bundesliga
- Biggest defeat: 1–4 vs Bologna, 27 November 2025, UEFA Europa League
Home colours	Away colours	European colours

The 2025–26 season was the 93rd season in the history of Red Bull Salzburg, and the club's 37th consecutive season in the top flight of Austrian football. In addition to the domestic league, the club participated in the Austrian Cup, the UEFA Champions League, and the UEFA Europa League.

== Coaching staff ==
As of 18 June 2025

Position	Staff
Head coach	(Germany) Thomas Letsch
Assistant coach	(Germany) Kai Hesse (Germany) Jens Wissing
Head of Goalkeeping	(Austria) David Schartner
Goalkeeper coach	(Portugal) Pedro Pereira
Athletic coach	(Austria) Sebastian Kirchner (Spain) Adrián Jiménez Leiva
Rehab coach	(United States) Scott Eisele
Video analyst	(Austria) Rainer Sonnberger
Match analyst	(Germany) Sebastian Sommer (Germany) Tim Stenske

== Players ==
=== First-team squad ===
As of 3 February 2026

Note: Flags indicate national team as defined under FIFA eligibility rules; some limited exceptions apply. Players may hold more than one non-FIFA nationality.

No.	Pos.	Nation	Player
1	GK	AUT	Alexander Schlager
3	DF	SRB	Aleksa Terzić
4	DF	SWE	John Mellberg
5	MF	MLI	Soumaila Diabate
7	FW	DEN	Clement Bischoff
8	MF	JPN	Sōta Kitano
9	FW	AUT	Karim Onisiwo
11	FW	BEL	Yorbe Vertessen
13	DF	GER	Frans Krätzig
14	MF	DEN	Maurits Kjærgaard
15	MF	MLI	Mamady Diambou
16	MF	JPN	Takumu Kawamura
18	MF	DEN	Mads Bidstrup (captain)
19	FW	CIV	Karim Konaté
20	FW	GHA	Edmund Baidoo

No.	Pos.	Nation	Player
21	DF	GER	Tim Drexler
22	DF	AUT	Stefan Lainer
23	DF	FRA	Joane Gadou
24	FW	HUN	Damir Redzic
25	MF	CRO	Oliver Lukić
27	FW	BIH	Kerim Alajbegović
36	DF	AUT	Justin Omoregie
37	MF	AUT	Tim Trummer
38	MF	AUT	Valentin Sulzbacher
43	FW	SUI	Enrique Aguilar
44	DF	AUT	Jannik Schuster
49	FW	MLI	Moussa Yeo
52	GK	AUT	Christian Zawieschitzky
91	DF	JPN	Anrie Chase
92	GK	AUT	Salko Hamzić

=== Other players under contract ===
Note: Flags indicate national team as defined under FIFA eligibility rules; some limited exceptions apply. Players may hold more than one non-FIFA nationality.

No.	Pos.	Nation	Player
17	MF	SLO	Miha Matjašec

=== Out on loan ===
As of 16 January 2026

Note: Flags indicate national team as defined under FIFA eligibility rules; some limited exceptions apply. Players may hold more than one non-FIFA nationality.

No.	Pos.	Nation	Player
2	DF	GER	Hendry Blank (at Hannover 96 until 30 June 2026)
6	MF	FRA	Lucas Gourna-Douath (at Le Havre until 30 June 2026)
10	MF	AUT	Zeteny Jano (at Grazer AK until 30 June 2026)
26	MF	COL	Mayker Palacios (at FC Liefering until 30 June 2025)
28	DF	BFA	Lassina Traoré (at FC Liefering until 30 June 2026)
29	FW	BFA	Aboubacar Camara (at FC Liefering until 30 June 2026)

No.	Pos.	Nation	Player
33	DF	BRA	Douglas Mendes (at FC Liefering until 30 June 2026)
39	DF	GER	Leandro Morgalla (at VfL Bochum until 30 June 2026)
42	MF	ENG	Bobby Clark (at Derby County until 30 June 2026)
45	FW	DEN	Adam Daghim (at VfL Wolfsburg until 30 June 2026)
70	FW	MLI	Gaoussou Diakité (at Lausanne-Sport until 30 June 2026)

== Transfers ==
=== In ===
Date	Pos.	Player	From	Fee	Ref.
30 June 2025	MF	(France) Lucas Gourna-Douath	(Italy) Roma	Loan return	
30 June 2025	DF	(Austria) Justin Omoregie	(Austria) TSV Hartberg	Loan return	
1 July 2025	MF	(Slovenia) Miha Matjašec	(Slovenia) Domžale	€1,500,000	
1 July 2025	MF	(Colombia) Mayker Palacios	(Colombia) AA de Fútbol Popayán	Undisclosed	
3 July 2025	FW	(Bosnia and Herzegovina) Kerim Alajbegović	(Germany) Bayer Leverkusen	€2,000,000	
1 August 2025	DF	(Japan) Anrie Chase	(Germany) VfB Stuttgart	€2,000,000	
2 September 2025	FW	(Denmark) Clement Bischoff	(Denmark) Brøndby	€2,000,000	
31 January 2026	DF	(Germany) Tim Drexler	(Germany) TSG Hoffenheim	€2,000,000	
3 February 2026	FW	(Hungary) Damir Redzic	(Slovakia) DAC 1904	€4,750,000	
11 February 2026	DF	(Angola) Elione Fernandes Neto	(Austria) FC Liefering	Loan return	

Total spending: ▼€14.25M

=== Out ===
Date	Pos.	Player	To	Fee	Ref.
30 June 2025	GK	(Germany) Janis Blaswich	(Germany) RB Leipzig	End of loan	
30 June 2025	DF	(Belgium) Maximiliano Caufriez	(France) Clermont	End of loan	
1 July 2025	GK	(Germany) Jonas Krumrey	(Germany) Holstein Kiel	€150,000	
1 July 2025	DF	(Switzerland) Bryan Okoh	(Switzerland) Lausanne-Sport	Undisclosed	
1 July 2025	DF	(Mali) Daouda Guindo	(France) Brest	End of contract	
1 July 2025	DF	(Brazil) Douglas Mendes	(Austria) FC Liefering	Loan	
1 July 2025	DF	(Belgium) Ignace Van der Brempt	(Italy) Como	€5,000,000	
1 July 2025	DF	(Austria) Raphael Hofer	(Slovenia) Mura	Undisclosed	
1 July 2025	DF	(Germany) Leandro Morgalla	(Germany) VfL Bochum	Loan (€200,000)	
1 July 2025	MF	(Ghana) Lawrence Agyekum	(Belgium) Cercle Brugge	€800,000	
1 July 2025	MF	(Austria) Luka Reischl	(Netherlands) ADO Den Haag	Undisclosed	
1 July 2025	MF	(Nigeria) Samson Tijani	(Czech Republic) Dukla Prague	Free transfer	
2 July 2025	MF	(Slovenia) Miha Matjašec	(Austria) FC Liefering	Loan	
2 July 2025	MF	(Colombia) Mayker Palacios	(Austria) FC Liefering	Loan	
4 July 2025	ST	(Mali) Gaoussou Diakité	(Switzerland) Lausanne-Sport	Loan	
10 July 2025	MF	(Argentina) Nicolás Capaldo	(Germany) Hamburger SV	€4,500,000	
14 July 2025	DF	(Bosnia and Herzegovina) Amar Dedić	(Portugal) Benfica	€12,000,000	
17 July 2025	DF	(Austria) Samson Baidoo	(France) Lens	€8,000,000	
18 July 2025	ST	(Italy) Nicolò Turco	Contract termination		
21 July 2025	MF	(Austria) Dijon Kameri	(Poland) Cracovia	Undisclosed	
1 August 2025	MF	(Israel) Oscar Gloukh	(Netherlands) Ajax	€14,750,000	
5 August 2025	MF	(England) Bobby Clark	(England) Derby County	Loan	
18 August 2025	FW	(Mali) Dorgeles Nene	(Turkey) Fenerbahçe	€18,000,000	
30 August 2025	DF	(Poland) Kamil Piątkowski	(Poland) Legia Warsaw	Undisclosed	
1 September 2025	FW	(Denmark) Adam Daghim	(Germany) VfL Wolfsburg	Loan	
1 September 2025	ST	(Switzerland) Federico Crescenti	Contract termination		
8 January 2026	FW	(Serbia) Petar Ratkov	(Italy) Lazio	€13,000,000	
16 January 2026	MF	(France) Lucas Gourna-Douath	(France) Le Havre	Loan	
30 January 2026	DF	(Denmark) Jacob Rasmussen	(Germany) 1. FC Kaiserslautern	Undisclosed	
13 February 2026	DF	(Angola) Elione Fernandes Neto	(Czech Republic) Hradec Králové	Undisclosed	

Total income: ▲€76.4M
Balance: ▲€62.15M

== Friendlies ==
The club's pre-season training commenced on 3 June 2025, followed by a training camp in Salzachsee.

15 July 2025 Friendly	Red Bull Salzburg	2–1	Qarabağ	Zell am See, Austria
18:00 CEST (UTC+2)	Kitano 29'; Baidoo 56'	Report	Axundzadə 42'	Stadium: Alois Latini Stadion; Referee: Philipp Maier

18 July 2025 Friendly	Red Bull Salzburg	1–2	Derby County	Salzburg, Austria
18:00 CEST (UTC+2)	Daghim 48'	Report	Blackett-Taylor 27'; Jackson 41'	Stadium: SAK-Platz; Referee: Marina Zechner

6 January 2026 Friendly	Red Bull Salzburg	0–5	Bayern Munich	Salzburg, Austria
15:00 CET (UTC+1)		Report	Itō 45'; Karl 72', 88'; Chávez 75'; Bischof 90+2'	Stadium: Red Bull Arena; Attendance: 29,090; Referee: Christopher Jäger

== Competitions ==
=== Overall record ===
Competition	First match	Last match	Starting round	Final position	Record							
Competition	First match	Last match	Starting round	Final position	Pld	W	D	L	GF	GA	GD	Win %
Bundesliga	2 August 2025	17 May 2026	Matchday 1	3rd	32	13	9	10	56	41	+15	40.63
Austrian Cup	26 July 2025	4 March 2026	First round	Semi-finals	5	4	0	1	11	3	+8	80.00
UEFA Champions League	23 July 2025	12 August 2025	Second qualifying round	Third qualifying round	4	1	1	2	7	6	+1	25.00
UEFA Europa League	25 September 2025	29 January 2026	League phase	League phase	8	2	0	6	10	15	−5	25.00
Total					49	20	10	19	84	65	+19	40.82

Source: Soccerway

=== Bundesliga ===
==== League table ====
Pos	Team	Pld	W	D	L	GF	GA	GD	Pts	Qualification
1	Sturm Graz	22	12	2	8	33	26	+7	38	Qualification for the Championship round
2	Red Bull Salzburg	22	10	7	5	42	26	+16	37	Qualification for the Championship round
3	LASK	22	11	4	7	32	30	+2	37	Qualification for the Championship round
4	Austria Wien	22	11	3	8	34	30	+4	36	Qualification for the Championship round
5	SK Rapid	22	9	6	7	26	25	+1	33	Qualification for the Championship round

Source: Austrian Football Bundesliga
Rules for classification: 1) Points; 2) Head-to-head record; 3) Goal difference; 4) Goals scored; 5) Matches won; 6) Away matches won; 7) Away goals scored.

==== Results summary ====
Overall								Home						Away					
Pld	W	D	L	GF	GA	GD	Pts	W	D	L	GF	GA	GD	W	D	L	GF	GA	GD
22	10	7	5	42	26	+16	37	5	3	3	22	14	+8	5	4	2	20	12	+8

Source: Austrian Football Bundesliga

==== Results by round ====
Round	1	2	3	4	5	6	7	8	9	10	11	12	13	14	15	16	17	18	19	20	21	22
Ground	A	H	A	H	H	A	H	A	H	H	A	H	A	H	A	A	H	H	A	A	H	A
Result	D	W	W	W	D	L	L	W	W	D	W	W	D	L	D	W	W	L	D	W	D	L
Position	6	4	1	1	2	2	5	4	4	2	1	1	1	1	1	1	1	1	1	1	1	2

Source: Austrian Football Bundesliga
A = Away; H = Home; W = Win; D = Draw; L = Loss

==== Matches ====
The league fixtures were announced on 27 June 2025.

Win Draw Loss Fixtures

2 August 2025 1	SV Ried	2–2	Red Bull Salzburg	Ried
19:30 CEST (UTC+2)	Muntandwa 31'; Steurer 53'; Bajic (yellow card) 76'; Wernitznig (yellow card) 79'	Report	Kitano 9'; Krätzig (yellow card) 52' (yellow-red card) 90+6'; Vertessen 90+6'	Stadium: Josko Arena; Attendance: 6,866; Referee: Alexander Harkam

9 August 2025 2	Red Bull Salzburg	5–0	Grazer AK	Salzburg
19:30 CEST (UTC+2)	Alajbegović 45+6'; Daghim (yellow card) 45+7'; Kjærgaard 56'; Vertessen 76', 82'; Ratkov 81' (pen.)	Report	Fofana (red card) 23'; Hofleitner (yellow card) 46'	Stadium: Red Bull Arena; Attendance: 7,544; Referee: Daniel Pfister

16 August 2025 3	TSV Hartberg	1–2	Red Bull Salzburg	Hartberg
17:00 CEST (UTC+2)	Tobias Kainz (yellow card) 14'; Henning (yellow card) 40'; Jed Drew 54'; Hulsmann (yellow card) 78'	Report	Lainer 11'; Gadou (yellow card) 49'; Ratkov 67'; Daghim (yellow card) 84'	Stadium: Stadion Hartberg; Attendance: 1,653; Referee: Stefan Ebner

23 August 2025 4	Red Bull Salzburg	3–0	LASK	Salzburg
22:00 CEST (UTC+2)	Diabate 24'; Ratkov 31'; Baidoo 82'	Report	Horvath (yellow card) 35' (yellow-red card); Bello (yellow card) 36'	Stadium: Red Bull Arena; Attendance: 10,545; Referee: Julian Weinberger

30 August 2025 5	Red Bull Salzburg	2–2	BW Linz	Salzburg
17:00 CEST (UTC+2)	Ratkov 37', 89' (pen.); Rasmussen (yellow card) 57'	Report	Seidl 15', 73'; Anderson (yellow card) 82'	Stadium: Red Bull Arena; Attendance: 8,450; Referee: Isa Simsek

13 September 2025 6	Wolfsberger AC	3–1	Red Bull Salzburg	Wolfsberg
17:00 CEST (UTC+2)	Markus Pink 1'; Schöpf 33'; Gattermayer 51'	Report	Vertessen 62'	Stadium: Lavanttal-Arena; Attendance: 4,752; Referee: Jakob Semler

20 September 2025 7	Red Bull Salzburg	0–2	Sturm Graz	Salzburg
17:00 CEST (UTC+2)	Diabate (red card) 22'; Schlager (yellow card) 69'	Report	Karić (yellow card) 38'; Horvat 41'; Jatta 50'; Malone (yellow card) 86'	Stadium: Red Bull Arena; Attendance: 10,938; Referee: Stefan Ebner

28 September 2025 8	WSG Tirol	1–2	Red Bull Salzburg	Innsbruck
14:30 CEST (UTC+2)	Taferner (yellow card) 78'; Hinterseer 90'	Report	Alajbegović 34'; Gourna-Douath (yellow card) 46'; Ratkov 76'	Stadium: Tivoli Stadion Tirol; Attendance: 4,122; Referee: Josef Spurny

5 October 2025 9	Red Bull Salzburg	2–1	Rapid Wien	Salzburg
17:00 CEST (UTC+2)	Alajbegović (yellow card) 20'; Hesse (yellow card) 23'; Diabate 38'; Kitano 57', (yellow card) 90+5'; Gadou (yellow card) 78'; Lainer (yellow card) 79'; Krätzig (yellow card) 81'	Report	Radulović 45'; Seidl (yellow card) 65'; Gulliksen (yellow card) 66'; Raux-Yao (yellow card) 83'	Stadium: Red Bull Arena; Attendance: 12,395; Referee: Jakob Semler

19 October 2025 10	Red Bull Salzburg	2–2	SCR Altach	Salzburg
14:30 CEST (UTC+2)	Gadou (yellow card) 20' (yellow-red card) 22'; Rasmussen (yellow card) 34'; Alajbegović 41', (yellow card) 77'; Yeo (yellow card) 52'; Baidoo 56'; Schlager (yellow card) 60'; Diabate (yellow card) 63'; Letsch (yellow card) 67'; Vertessen (yellow card) 90+6'	Report	Greil 34'; Mustapha (yellow card) 49'; Bähre (yellow card) 62'; Diawara 80'	Stadium: Red Bull Arena; Attendance: 8,173; Referee: Stefan Ebner

26 October 2025 11	Austria Wien	0–3	Red Bull Salzburg	Vienna
17:00 CET (UTC+1)	Pazourek	Report	Kitano 8'; Alajbegović 16'; Trummer 56'; Ratkov (yellow card) 89'	Stadium: Franz Horr Stadium; Attendance: 14,479; Referee: Walter Altmann

2 November 2025 12	Red Bull Salzburg	4–1	SV Ried	Salzburg
14:30 CET (UTC+1)	Bischoff 1'; Kitano 45'; Baidoo 72'; Ratkov 81'	Report	Mutandwa 34'; Havenaar (red card) 49'	Stadium: Red Bull Arena; Attendance: 8,352; Referee: Julian Weinberger

9 November 2025 13	Sturm Graz	1–1	Red Bull Salzburg	Graz
17:00 CET (UTC+1)	Grgić 46'; Mitchell (yellow card) 90+4'	Report	Ratkov (yellow card) 44'; Vertessen 65'; Lainer (yellow card) 66'; Diabate (yellow card) 81'	Stadium: Merkur Spiel-Arena; Attendance: 15,517; Referee: Stefan Ebner

23 November 2025 14	Red Bull Salzburg	2–3	WSG Tirol	Salzburg
14:30 CET (UTC+1)	Alajbegović (yellow card) 5'; Yeo 12'; Baidoo 37'; Diabate (yellow card) 90+4'; Schlager (yellow card) 90+6'	Report	Müller (yellow card) 26', (goal) 90+6'; Baden 64', (yellow card) 71'; Lawrence 75'; Böckle (yellow card) 78'; Taferner (yellow card) 81' (yellow-red card) 87'	Stadium: Red Bull Arena; Attendance: 6,123; Referee: Achim Untergasser

30 November 2025 15	SCR Altach	1–1	Red Bull Salzburg	Altach
14:30 CET (UTC+1)	Koller 26'; Zech (yellow card) 85'	Report	Ratkov 13'; Diabate (yellow card) 24'; Bidstrup (yellow card) 81'	Stadium: Stadion Schnabelholz; Attendance: 4,826; Referee: Christian-Petru Ciochirca

6 December 2025 16	BW Linz	0–2	Red Bull Salzburg	Linz
17:00 CET (UTC+1)	Pašić (yellow card) 65'; Strauss (yellow card) 75'	Report	Ratkov 19'; Baidoo 70'; Schlager (yellow card) 90+3'	Stadium: Hofmann Personal Stadion; Attendance: 4,672; Referee: Jakob Semler

14 December 2025 17	Red Bull Salzburg	2–1	Wolfsberger AC	Salzburg
14:30 CET (UTC+1)	Alajbegović 7', 86'; Diabate (yellow card) 23'; Sulzbacher (yellow card) 75' (yellow-red card) 90+6'; Krätzig (yellow card) 75'	Report	Zukić 35' (pen.); Wohlmuth (yellow card) 77'	Stadium: Red Bull Arena; Attendance: 30,188; Referee: Alain Sadikovsk

6 February 2026 18	Red Bull Salzburg	0–2	Austria Wien	Salzburg
17:00 CET (UTC+1)		Report	Barry 21'; Eggestein 24'; Handl (yellow card) 90'	Stadium: Red Bull Arena; Attendance: 7,559; Referee: Harald Lechner

15 February 2026 19	Grazer AK	1–1	Red Bull Salzburg	Graz
14:30 CET (UTC+1)	Klassen 16'; Koch (yellow card) 47'; Maderner (yellow card) 90+3'; Owusu (yellow card) 90+3'	Report	Konaté 40'	Stadium: Liebenauer Stadium; Attendance: 5,739; Referee: Daniel Pfister

22 February 2026 20	LASK	1–5	Red Bull Salzburg	Linz
17:00 CET (UTC+1)	Kalajdžić 18'	Report	Alajbegović 6'; Konaté 10', 64'; Kitano 37'; Lainer (yellow card) 50'; Redzic 90+4'	Stadium: Raiffeisen Arena; Attendance: 13,669; Referee: Alexander Harkam

1 March 2026 21	Red Bull Salzburg	0–0	TSV Hartberg	Salzburg
17:00 CET (UTC+1)	Diabate (yellow card) 57'; Konaté (yellow card) 59'	Report	Vincze (yellow card) 90+4'	Stadium: Red Bull Arena; Attendance: 7,458; Referee: Isa Simsek

8 March 2026 22	Rapid Wien	1–0	Red Bull Salzburg	Vienna
17:00 CET (UTC+1)	Antiste 38'; Dahl (yellow card) 90+6'	Report	Gadou (yellow card) 47'; Diambou (yellow card) 50'; Bidstrup (yellow card) 75'	Stadium: Allianz Stadion; Attendance: 14,570; Referee: Harald Lechner

==== League table ====
Pos	Team	Pld	W	D	L	GF	GA	GD	Pts	Qualification
1	LASK (C)	32	17	7	8	56	42	+14	39	Qualification for the Champions League play-off round
2	Sturm Graz	32	16	8	8	51	35	+16	37	Qualification for the Champions League second qualifying round
3	Red Bull Salzburg	32	13	9	10	56	41	+15	29	Qualification for the Europa League third qualifying round (Note: The 2025–26 Austrian Cup winners (LASK) qualified for the Europa League third qualifying round. Since LASK finished as league champions, the Europa League berth went to the third place team.)
4	Austria Wien	32	14	5	13	45	50	−5	29	Qualification for the Conference League second qualifying round
5	SK Rapid (O)	32	12	8	12	36	41	−5	27	Qualification for the Conference League play-offs

Source: Austrian Football Bundesliga
Rules for classification: 1) Points; 2) Points with (possible) half points subtracted due to rounding; 3) Head-to-head points; 4) Head-to-head goal difference; 5) Head-to-head goals scored; 6) Goal difference; 7) Goals scored; 8) Matches won; 9) Away matches won; 10) Away goals scored.
(C) Champions; (O) Play-off winners

==== Results summary ====
Overall								Home						Away					
Pld	W	D	L	GF	GA	GD	Pts	W	D	L	GF	GA	GD	W	D	L	GF	GA	GD
10	3	2	5	14	15	−1	11	1	1	3	7	9	−2	2	1	2	7	6	+1

Source: Austrian Football Bundesliga

==== Results by round ====
Round	1	2	3	4	5	6	7	8	9	10
Ground	H	A	A	H	A	H	A	H	A	H
Result	L	D	W	L	W	W	L	D	L	L
Position	5	4	4	4	4	2	4	3	3	3

Source: Austrian Football Bundesliga
A = Away; H = Home; W = Win; D = Draw; L = Loss

==== Matches ====
15 March 2026 23	Red Bull Salzburg	0–1	Rapid Wien	Ried
14:30 CET (UTC+1)	Gadou (red card) 67'; Vertessen (yellow card) 76'	Report	Horn (yellow card) 19'; Grgic (yellow card) 22'; Seidl 69'; Cvetković (yellow card) 76'; Amane (yellow card) 79'	Stadium: Red Bull Arena; Attendance: 9,957; Referee: Markus Hameter

20 March 2026 24	Sturm Graz	1–1	Red Bull Salzburg	Graz
19:30 CET (UTC+1)	Mamageishvili (yellow card) 13'; Stanković 45+5'; Kiteishvili (yellow card) 51'; Fosso (yellow card) 74'	Report	Vertessen 32', (yellow card) 37'; Drexler (yellow card) 74'; Chase (yellow card) 77' (yellow-red card) 90+1'; Diabate (yellow card) 86'	Stadium: Liebenauer Stadium; Attendance: 14,817; Referee: Julian Weinberger

5 April 2026 25	TSV Hartberg	1–2	Red Bull Salzburg	Hartberg
14:30 CEST (UTC+2)	Havel 30'; Wilfinger (yellow card) 69'; Hülsmann (yellow card) 74'; Spendlhofer (red card) 83'	Report	Konaté (yellow card) 36', (goal) 57'; Lainer (yellow card) 50'; Kitano 58'; Terzić (yellow card) 70'	Stadium: Stadion Hartberg; Attendance: 2,777; Referee: Safak Barmaksiz

10 April 2026 26	Red Bull Salzburg	2–3	LASK	Salzburg
19:30 CEST (UTC+2)	Konaté 28'; Kjærgaard 90+1'	Report	Cissé 8'; Coulibaly (yellow card) 57'; Kalajdžić 61'; Mbuyamba 90+5'	Stadium: Red Bull Arena; Attendance: 8,737; Referee: Christian-Petru Ciochirca

19 April 2026 27	Austria Wien	1–3	Red Bull Salzburg	Vienna
14:30 CEST (UTC+2)	Šaljić (yellow card) 35'; Boateng 61', (yellow card) 62'	Report	Alajbegović 3'; Kjærgaard (yellow card) 14'; Konaté 28'; Lainer (yellow card) 45+1'; Krätzig (yellow card) 50'; Onisiwo 77'; Yeo (yellow card) 86'	Stadium: Franz Horr Stadium; Attendance: 14,532; Referee: Markus Hameter

22 April 2026 28	Red Bull Salzburg	3–1	Austria Wien	Salzburg
18:30 CEST (UTC+2)	Kjærgaard (yellow card) 6'; Vertessen 16'; Schuster 22'; Alajbegović (yellow card) 72'; Şahin-Radlinger 76' (o.g.)	Report	Ranftl 34'; Maybach (yellow card) 41'; Lee Kang-hee (yellow card) 78'; Plavotic (yellow card) 90'	Stadium: Red Bull Arena; Attendance: 7,154; Referee: Harald Lechner

26 April 2026 29	Rapid Wien	1–0	Red Bull Salzburg	Vienna
14:30 CEST (UTC+2)	Cvetković (yellow card) 2'; Kara 88', (yellow card) 89'	Report	Lainer (yellow card) 78'	Stadium: Allianz Stadion; Attendance: 24,166; Referee: Christian-Petru Ciochirca

3 May 2026 30	Red Bull Salzburg	1–1	Sturm Graz	Salzburg
17:00 CEST (UTC+2)	Vertessen 22'	Report	Mamageishvili (yellow card) 5'; Kayombo 90+3'; Gazibegović (yellow card) 90+7'	Stadium: Red Bull Arena; Attendance: 17,318; Referee: Harald Lechner

10 May 2026 31	LASK	2–1	Red Bull Salzburg	Linz
17:00 CEST (UTC+2)	Adeniran 33'; Jørgensen 36'; Daněk (yellow card) 88'; Cissé (yellow card) 90+2'	Report	Konaté 87'	Stadium: Raiffeisen Arena; Attendance: 17,000; Referee: Markus Hameter

17 May 2026 32	Red Bull Salzburg	1–3	TSV Hartberg	Salzburg
14:30 CEST (UTC+2)	Vertessen (yellow card) 36'; Alajbegović 83'	Report	Hoffman 22'; Wilfinger 42'; Spendlhofer (yellow card) 78'; Kovacevic 90'	Stadium: Red Bull Arena; Attendance: 7,653; Referee: Stefan Ebner

=== Austrian Cup ===
Win Draw Loss Fixtures

26 July 2025 First round	Union Dietach	0–4	Red Bull Salzburg	Dietach
18:00 CEST (UTC+2)	Ketan (red card) 76'	Report	Nene 22'; Ratkov 52', 69'; Terzić (red card) 76'; Alajbegović 90'	Stadium: DietachArena; Attendance: 3,650; Referee: Emil Ristoskov

27 August 2025 Second round	Dornbirn 1913	1–3	Red Bull Salzburg	Dornbirn
17:00 CEST (UTC+2)	Makovec 40'; Stojnić (yellow card) 90+2'	Report	Alajbegović 20'; Ratkov 70'; Vertessen 83'; Yeo (yellow card) 90'	Stadium: Stadion Birkenwiese; Attendance: 12,000; Referee: Stefan Macanovic

30 October 2025 Third round	Red Bull Salzburg	3–1 (a.e.t.)	WSG Tirol	Salzburg
19:00 CET (UTC+1)	Diambou (yellow card) 31'; Yeo 75'; Kjærgaard 93'; Bischoff 107'	Report	Ola-Adebomi (yellow card) 48'; Tafferner (yellow card) 65'; Lawrence 68'; Böckle (yellow card) 90+1'; Stejskal (yellow card) 90+3'; Sabitzer (yellow card) 90+4'; Jaunegg (yellow card) 120+2'	Stadium: Red Bull Arena; Attendance: 5,016; Referee: Christian-Petru Ciochirca

1 February 2026 Quarter-finals	Wolfsberger AC	0–1	Red Bull Salzburg	Wolfsberg
17:30 CET (UTC+1)	Suzlner (yellow card) 10'; Diabaté (red card) 19'; Avdijaj (yellow card) 41'	Report	Konaté 34'; Gadou (yellow card) 37'	Stadium: Lavanttal-Arena; Attendance: 3,025; Referee: Jakob Semler

4 March 2026 Semi-finals	Red Bull Salzburg	0–1	SCR Altach	Salzburg
18:00 CET (UTC+1)	Bidstrup (yellow card) 65'; Schlager (yellow card) 90+2'	Report	Jäger 45+2'; Ouédraogo (yellow card) 63'; Yalcin (yellow card) 90+2'; Demaku (yellow card) 90+2'; Gorgon (yellow card) 90+6'	Stadium: Red Bull Arsena; Attendance: 5,720; Referee: Walter Altmann

=== UEFA Champions League ===
==== Second qualifying round ====
The draw for the second qualifying round was held on 18 June 2025.

23 July 2025 First leg	Brann (Norway)	1–4	(Austria) Red Bull Salzburg	Bergen, Norway
19:00 CEST (UTC+2)	Sørensen (yellow card) 6'; Sery Larsen (yellow card) 8'; Magnússon 20'; Mathisen (yellow card) 39'; Myhre (yellow card) 68'	Report	Diambou (yellow card) 22'; Nene 58'; Onisiwo 61'; Vertessen 87'; Kjærgaard 90+2' (pen.)	Stadium: Brann Stadion; Attendance: 14,587; Referee: Damian Sylwestrzak (Poland)

30 July 2025 Second leg	Red Bull Salzburg (Austria)	1–1 (5–2 agg.)	(Norway) Brann	Salzburg, Austria
20:45 CEST (UTC+2)	Kjærgaard 6'; Vertessen (yellow card) 47'; Nene (yellow card) 59'; Bidstrup (yellow card) 67'; Rasmussen (yellow card) 82'; Baidoo (yellow card) 85'	Report	Kornvig 3'; Soltvedt (yellow card) 5'; Sørensen (yellow card) 54'; Mathisen (yellow card) 66'; Magnússon (yellow card) 67'; Sery Larsen (yellow card) 70'	Stadium: Red Bull Arena; Attendance: 11,949; Referee: Rade Obrenovič (Slovenia)

==== Third qualifying round ====
The draw for the third qualifying round was held on 21 July 2025.

6 August 2025 First leg	Red Bull Salzburg (Austria)	0–1	(Belgium) Club Brugge	Salzburg, Austria
19:00 CEST (UTC+2)	Nene (yellow card) 63'	Report	Onyedika (yellow card) 52'; Vermant 75'	Stadium: Red Bull Arena; Attendance: 12,782; Referee: Srđan Jovanović (Serbia)

12 August 2025 Second leg	Club Brugge (Belgium)	3–2 (4–2 agg.)	(Austria) Red Bull Salzburg	Bruges, Belgium
19:30 CEST (UTC+2)	Seys 61'; Spileers (yellow card) 81'; Forbs 83'; Vanaken 90+4'	Report	Rasmussen 18'; Baidoo 32'	Stadium: Jan Breydel Stadium; Attendance: 23,376; Referee: Irfan Peljto (Bosnia and Herzegovina)

=== UEFA Europa League ===
==== League phase ====
The league phase draw was held on 29 August 2025.

Pos	Team	Pld	W	D	L	GF	GA	GD	Pts
29	(Royal Dutch Football Association) Feyenoord	8	2	0	6	11	15	−4	6
30	(Swiss Football Association) Basel	8	2	0	6	9	13	−4	6
31	(Austrian Football Association) Red Bull Salzburg	8	2	0	6	10	15	−5	6
32	(Scottish Football Association) Rangers	8	1	1	6	5	14	−9	4
33	(French Football Federation) Nice	8	1	0	7	7	15	−8	3

Source: UEFA
Rules for classification: League phase tiebreakers

Round	1	2	3	4	5	6	7	8
Ground	H	A	H	H	A	A	H	A
Result	L	L	L	W	L	L	W	L
Position	28	34	34	28	29	31	28	31

Source: UEFA
A = Away; H = Home; W = Win; D = Draw; L = Loss

Win Draw Loss Fixtures

25 September 2025 1	Red Bull Salzburg (Austria)	0–1	(Portugal) Porto	Salzburg, Austria
21:00 CEST (UTC+2)	Yeo (yellow card) 16'; Rasmussen (yellow card) 80'; Kjærgaard (yellow card) 83'; Vertessen (yellow card) 86'	Report	William Gomes 90+3', (yellow card) 90+4'	Stadium: Red Bull Arena; Attendance: 9,993; Referee: Vasilios Fotias (Greece)

2 October 2025 2	Lyon (France)	2–0	(Austria) Red Bull Salzburg	Décines-Charpieu, France
21:00 CEST (UTC+2)	Šulc (penalty missed) 7'; Satriano 11'; Kluivert 57', (yellow card) 90'	Report	Diambou (yellow card) 51'	Stadium: Parc Olympique Lyonnais; Attendance: 31,767; Referee: Andris Treimanis (Latvia)

23 October 2025 3	Red Bull Salzburg (Austria)	2–3	(Hungary) Ferencváros	Salzburg, Austria
18:45 CEST (UTC+2)	Baidoo 13'; Vertessen 72'	Report	Varga (penalty missed) 22', 50'; Zachariassen 56', (yellow card) 64'; Yusuf 58'; Raemaekers (yellow card) 81'; O'Dowda (yellow card) 90+4'	Stadium: Red Bull Arena; Attendance: 8,342; Referee: Goga Kikacheishvili (Georgia)

6 November 2025 4	Red Bull Salzburg (Austria)	2–0	(Netherlands) Go Ahead Eagles	Salzburg, Austria
18:45 CET (UTC+1)	Vertessen 59'; Terzić 80'	Report	Rahmouni (yellow card) 29'; Suray (yellow card) 35'	Stadium: Red Bull Arena; Attendance: 10,852; Referee: Giorgi Kruashvili (Georgia)

27 November 2025 5	Bologna (Italy)	4–1	(Austria) Red Bull Salzburg	Bologna, Italy
21:00 CET (UTC+1)	Odgaard 26'; Dallinga 51'; Bernardeschi 53'; Orsolini 86'	Report	Vertessen 33', (yellow card) 43'; Yeo (yellow card) 46'	Stadium: Stadio Renato Dall'Ara; Attendance: 21,025; Referee: Igor Pajač (Croatia)

11 December 2025 6	SC Freiburg (Germany)	1–0	(Austria) Red Bull Salzburg	Freiburg, Germany
21:00 CET (UTC+1)	Lienhart 50'; Kübler (yellow card) 80'; Suzuki (yellow card) 90'	Report	Ratkov (red card) 37'; Lainer (yellow card) 45+1'	Stadium: Europa-Park Stadion; Attendance: 31,016; Referee: Elchin Masiyev (Azerbaijan)

22 January 2026 7	Red Bull Salzburg (Austria)	3–1	(Switzerland) Basel	Salzburg, Austria
21:00 CET (UTC+1)	Alajbegović 4', 12'; Krätzig 35'; Kitano (yellow card) 45'	Report	Agbonifo (yellow card) 37', (goal) 56'; Bačanin (yellow card) 40'; Vouilloz (yellow card) 50'	Stadium: Red Bull Arena; Attendance: 6,741; Referee: Anastasios Papapetrou (Greece)

29 January 2026 8	Aston Villa (England)	3–2	(Austria) Red Bull Salzburg	Birmingham, England
20:00 GMT (UTC+0)	Rogers 64'; Mings 76'; Jimoh-Aloba 87'	Report	Lindelöf 33' (o.g.); Trummer (yellow card) 35'; Yeo 49'	Stadium: Villa Park; Attendance: 37,457; Referee: Rohit Saggi (Norway)

== Statistics ==
=== Goalscorers ===
Rank	No.	Pos.	Player	Austrian Bundesliga	Austrian Cup	Champions League	Europa League	Total
1	11	FW	(Belgium) Yorbe Vertessen	8	3	1	3	15
2	27	FW	(Bosnia and Herzegovina) Kerim Alajbegović	9	0	2	2	13
3	21	FW	(Serbia) Petar Ratkov	9	3	0	0	12
4	19	FW	(Ivory Coast) Karim Konaté	7	1	0	0	8
5	20	FW	(Austria) Edmund Baidoo	5	0	1	1	7
6	8	MF	(Japan) Sōta Kitano	6	0	0	0	6
7	14	MF	(Denmark) Maurits Kjærgaard	2	1	2	0	5
8	15	MF	(Mali) Soumaila Diabate	2	0	0	0	2
9	7	MF	(Denmark) Clement Bischoff	1	1	0	0	2
10	49	MF	(Mali) Moussa Yeo	1	1	0	0	2
11	45	MF	(Mali) Dorgeles Nene	0	1	1	1	3
12	9	FW	(Austria) Karim Onisiwo	1	0	0	0	1
12	22	DF	(Austria) Stefan Lainer	1	0	0	0	1
12	24	FW	(Hungary) Damir Redzic	1	0	0	0	1
12	37	MF	(Austria) Tim Trummer	1	0	0	0	1
12	44	DF	(Austria) Jannik Schuster	1	0	0	0	1
17	2	DF	(Denmark) Jacob Rasmussen	0	0	1	0	1
18	3	DF	(Serbia) Aleksa Terzić	0	0	0	1	1
Total				55	11	7	5	78

Last updated: 17 May 2026.
Source: FBref.com

==== Hat-tricks ====
- Score – The score at the time of each goal. Salzburg's score listed first.

Date	No.	Pos.	Player	Score	Final score	Opponent	Competition

=== Top assists ===
Rank	No.	Pos.	Player	Austrian Bundesliga	Austrian Cup	Champions League	Europa League	Total
1	14	DF	(Denmark) Maurits Kjærgaard	5	1	1	1	8
2	22	DF	(Austria) Stefan Lainer	4	0	2	0	6
3	13	DF	(Germany) Frans Krätzig	4	1	0	0	5
4	8	FW	(Japan) Sōta Kitano	4	0	0	1	5
5	20	FW	(Ghana) Edmund Baidoo	3	2	0	0	5
6	7	MF	(Denmark) Clement Bischoff	3	1	0	0	4
7	27	FW	(Bosnia and Herzegovina) Kerim Alajbegović	3	0	0	0	3
8	49	MF	(Mali) Moussa Yeo	2	0	0	1	3
9	9	FW	(Austria) Karim Onisiwo	2	0	0	0	2
9	11	FW	(Belgium) Yorbe Vertessen	2	0	0	0	2
9	21	FW	(Serbia) Petar Ratkov	2	0	0	0	2
9	45	MF	(Mali) Dorgeles Nene	2	0	0	0	2
13	3	DF	(Serbia) Aleksa Terzić	1	0	0	1	2
14	2	DF	(Denmark) Jacob Rasmussen	1	0	0	0	1
14	5	MF	(Mali) Soumaila Diabate	1	0	0	0	1
14	18	MF	(Denmark) Mads Bidstrup	1	0	0	0	1
14	37	DF	(Austria) Tim Trummer	1	0	0	0	1
14	44	DF	(Austria) Jannik Schuster	1	0	0	0	1
19	30	MF	(Israel) Oscar Gloukh	0	0	1	0	1
Total				43	5	4	4	56

Last updated: 17 May 2026.
Source: FBref.com
