= Dejan Radonjić =

Dejan Radonjić may refer to:

- Dejan Radonjić (basketball) (born 1970), Montenegrin basketball coach and former player
- Dejan Radonjić (footballer, born 1990), German football forward
- Dejan Radonjić (footballer, born 2005), Austrian football centre-back
