= Soumaïla Diabaté =

Malian footballer (born 2004)

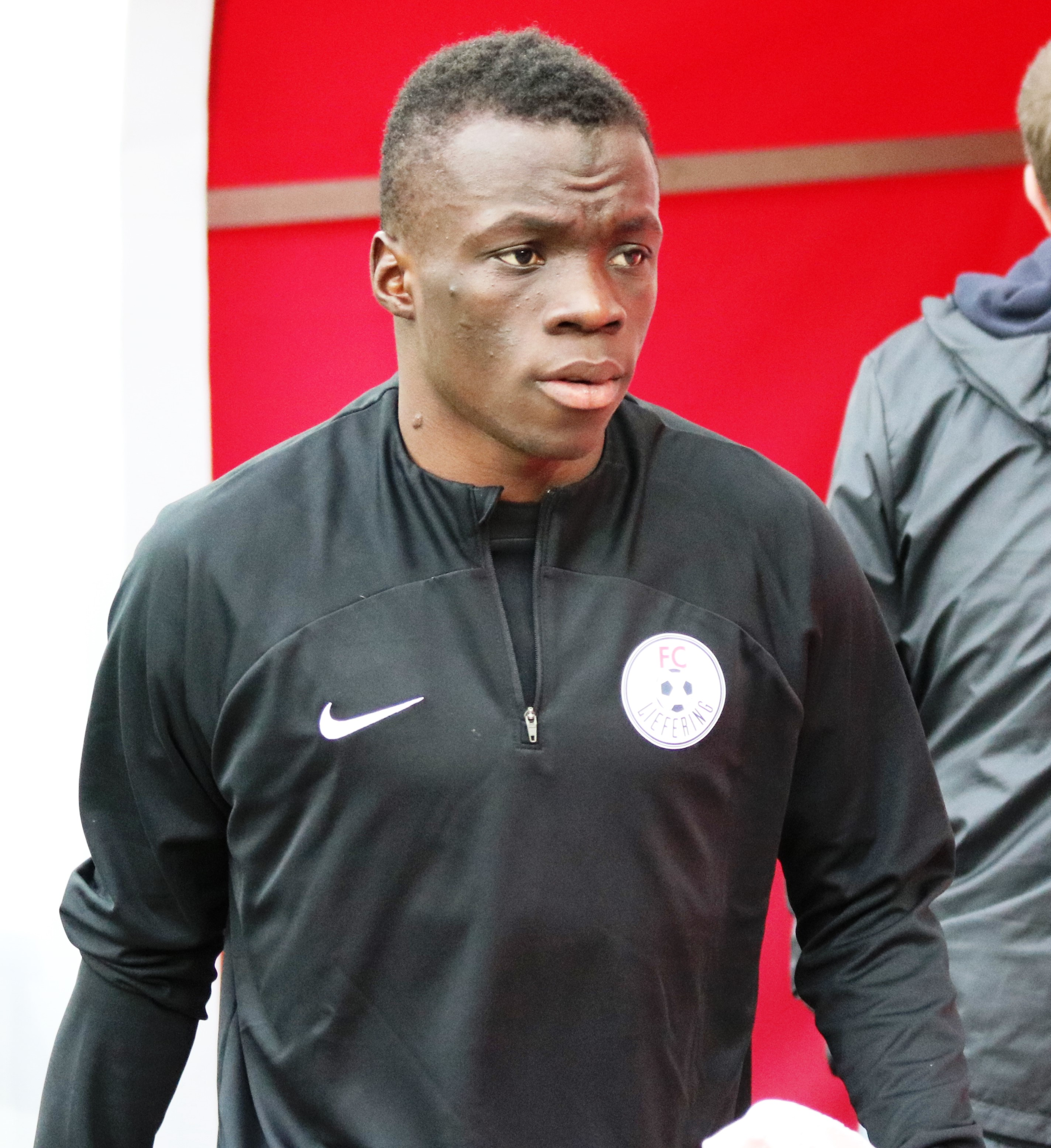
- Diabate in 2023

Personal information
- Date of birth: 22 November 2004 (age 21)
- Place of birth: Mali
- Height: 1.68 m (5 ft 6 in)
- Position: Midfielder

Team information
- Current team: Red Bull Salzburg
- Number: 5

Youth career
- JMG Academy
- –2022: FC Guidars

Senior career*
Years	Team	Apps	(Gls)
2023–	Red Bull Salzburg	28	(2)
2023–2024	→ FC Liefering (loan)	32	(2)
2024–2025	→ Blau-Weiß Linz (loan)	26	(0)

International career^{‡}
2026–	Mali	1	(0)
- * Club domestic league appearances and goals as of 1 August 2026 ‡ National team caps and goals as of 31 March 2026

Soumaïla Diabaté (born 22 November 2004) is a Malian professional footballer who plays as a midfielder for Austrian Bundesliga club Red Bull Salzburg and the Mali national team.

== Club career ==
Diabate spent his youth career at the JMG Academy and FC Guidars. After going on trial with Austrian club FC Liefering in December 2022, he officially joined parent club Red Bull Salzburg on 20 December, signing a five-year professional contract that was set to activate from January 2023. In the process, he became the fifth player to join the Austrian club through their affiliation with Guidars, following the likes of Nene Dorgeles, Daouda Guindo, Mamady Diambou and Moussa Yeo. The midfielder was assigned to Liefering's squad for the rest of the 2022–23 season.

On 1 April 2023, Diabate made his professional debut for Liefering, coming on as a substitute for Tolgahan Sahin at half-time of a 3–1 league defeat to Kapfenberger SV. On 23 September, he was sent-off for a double yellow card in a 3–0 league loss to Grazer AK.

On 31 March 2024, Diabate scored his first professional goal for Liefering in a 4–1 league win over Floridsdorfer AC.

== Career statistics ==
=== Club ===
As of match played 28 October 2026

Appearances and goals by club, season and competition
Club	Season	League			Austrian Cup		Europe		Other		Total	
Club	Season	Division	Apps	Goals	Apps	Goals	Apps	Goals	Apps	Goals	Apps	Goals
Red Bull Salzburg	2022–23	Austrian Bundesliga	0	0	0	0	0	0	—		0	0
Red Bull Salzburg	2024–25	Austrian Bundesliga	—		—		—		3 (Note: Appearances in FIFA Club World Cup)	0	3	0
Red Bull Salzburg	2025–26	Austrian Bundesliga	27	2	5	0	10 (Note: Two appearances in UEFA Champions League, eight appearances in UEFA Europa League)	0	—		42	2
Red Bull Salzburg	2026–27	Austrian Bundesliga	1	0	2	0	1 (Note: Appearance in UEFA Europa League)	0	—		4	0
Red Bull Salzburg	Total		28	2	7	0	11	0	3	0	49	2
Liefering (loan)	2022–23	2. Liga	3	0	0	0	—		—		3	0
Liefering (loan)	2023–24	2. Liga	26	1	0	0	—		—		26	1
Liefering (loan)	2024–25	2. Liga	3	1	0	0	—		—		3	1
Liefering (loan)	Total		32	2	0	0	—		—		32	2
Blau-Weiß Linz (loan)	2024–25	Austrian Bundesliga	26	0	1	0	—		—		27	0
Career total			86	4	8	0	11	0	3	0	108	4

=== International ===
As of match played 31 March 2026

Appearances and goals by national team and year
National team	Year	Apps	Goals
Mali	2026	1	0
Total		1	0
