= Miha Matjašec =

Slovenian footballer (born 2009)

Personal information
- Date of birth: 22 February 2009 (age 17)
- Place of birth: Slovenia
- Height: 1.84 m (6 ft 0 in)
- Positions: Midfielder; winger

Team information
- Current team: FC Liefering
- Number: 22

Youth career
- –2022: ND Beltinci
- 2022–2024: NŠ Mura
- 2024–2025: NK Domžale
- 2025–2026: FC Red Bull Salzburg

Senior career*
| Years | Team | Apps | (Gls) |
| 2025 | NK Domžale | 1 | (0) |
| 2026– | FC Liefering | 10 | (2) |

International career^{‡}
| 2022–2024 | Slovenia U15 | 21 | (2) |
| 2023–2024 | Slovenia U16 | 6 | (0) |
| 2024–2026 | Slovenia U17 | 19 | (4) |
| 2026– | Slovenia U21 | 2 | (1) |
- * Club domestic league appearances and goals ‡ National team caps and goals as of 2 October 2026

Miha Matjašec (born 22 February 2009) is a Slovenian professional footballer who plays as a midfielder or winger for FC Liefering.

== Early life ==
Matjašec was born on 22 February 2009 in Slovenia. he is a native of Črenšovci, Slovenia. Growing up, he started playing football at the age of four.

== Club career ==
As a youth player, Matjašec joined the youth academy of ND Beltinci. Following his stint there, he joined the youth academy of NŠ Mura in 2022 at under-15 level.

Subsequently, he joined the youth academy of NK Domžale in 2024 and was promoted to the club's senior team in 2025, where he made one league appearance and scored zero goals. On 5 March 2025, he debuted for them during a 3–1 home win over NK Olimpija Ljubljana in the league.

Ahead of the 2025–26 season, he joined the youth academy of Austrian side FC Red Bull Salzburg, helping the club's under-18 team win the league title and was promoted to their reserve team in 2026.

== International career ==
Matjašec is a Slovenia youth international and has represent the country internationally at under-15, under-16, under-17 and under-21 level. Altogether, he made twenty-one appearances and scored two goals while playing for the Slovenia national under-15 football team and six appearances and scored zero goals while playing for the Slovenia national under-16 football team.

During the autumn of 2024 and the spring of 2025, he played for the Slovenia national under-17 football team for 2025 UEFA European Under-17 Championship qualification. One year later, he played for the Slovenia national under-17 football team for 2026 UEFA European Under-17 Championship qualification.

== Style of play ==
Matjašec plays as a midfielder or winger and is left-footed. English newspaper The Guardian wrote in 2026 that "his impressive physical capacity paired with technical proficiency makes him stand out, along with his leadership".
