= Valentin Sulzbacher =

Austrian footballer (born 2005)

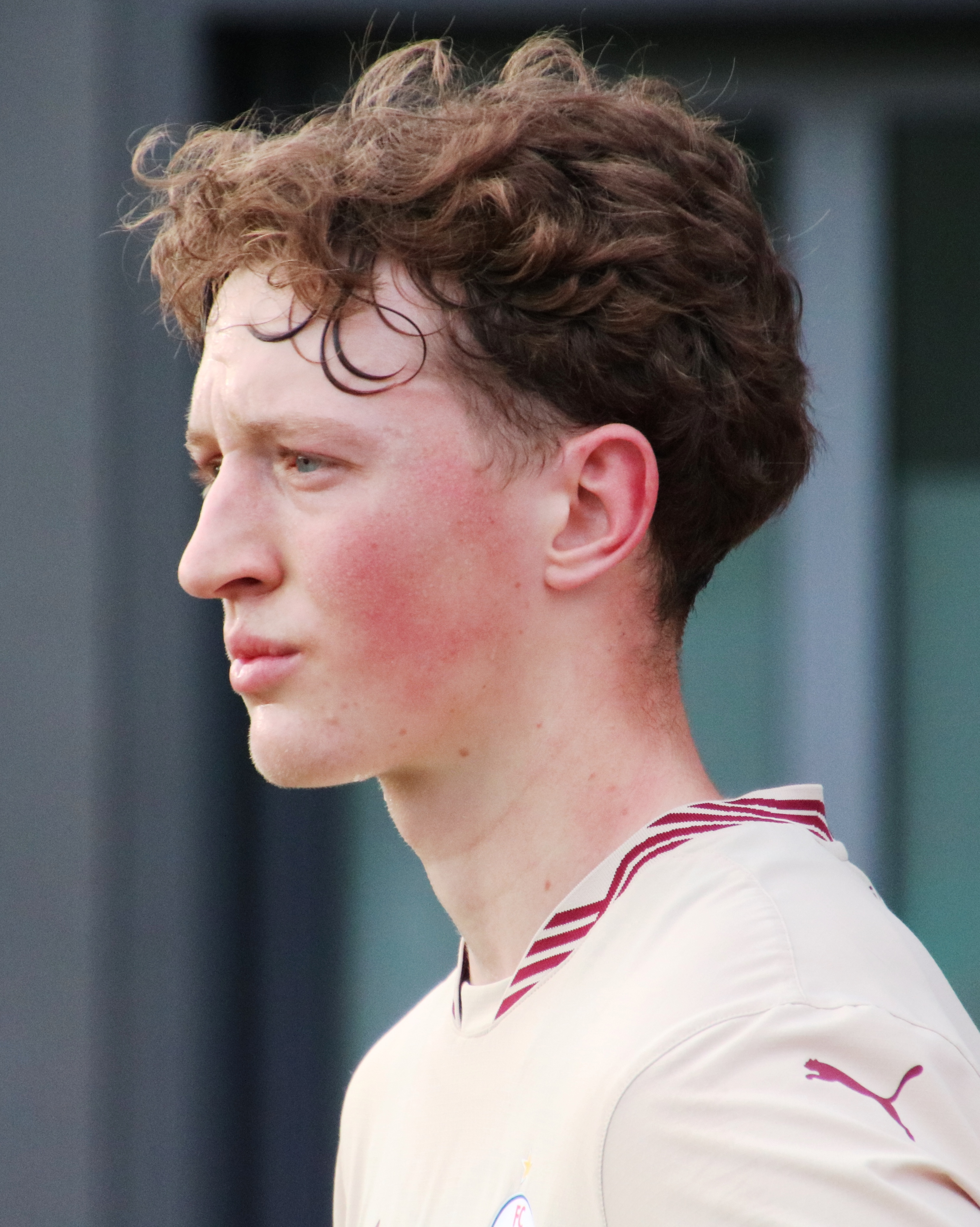
- Sulzbacher in 2025

Personal information
- Date of birth: 11 March 2005 (age 21)
- Place of birth: Austria
- Height: 1.92 m (6 ft 4 in)
- Position: Midfielder

Team information
- Current team: Excelsior
- Number: 18

Youth career
- ASKÖ Ohlsdorf
- 2015–2021: Red Bull Salzburg

Senior career*
Years	Team	Apps	(Gls)
2022–2026	FC Liefering	36	(2)
2025–2026	Red Bull Salzburg	7	(0)
2026–	Excelsior	0	(0)

International career^{‡}
2023	Austria U19	2	(0)
2025–	Austria U21	1	(0)
- * Club domestic league appearances and goals as of 17 May 2026 ‡ National team caps and goals as of 19 June 2025

Valentin Sulzbacher (born 11 March 2005) is an Austrian professional footballer who plays as a midfielder for Eredivisie club Excelsior.

== Club career ==
Sulzbacher is a youth product of Red Bull Salzburg, where he signed his first professional contract in July 2024, after having started his professional career with FC Liefering in the 2. Liga in April 2022.

By the 2024–25 season, he had established himself as a starter with FC Liefering, but also with Red Bull Salzburg's youth team in the UEFA Youth League, captaining the side that reached the semi-final of the competition. He however missed this last game of the competition, having already been added to Red Bull Salzburg's senior team.

Sulzbacher made his debut with RB Salzburg in a 2–1 Austrian Bundesliga win over Blau Weiss Linz on 6 April 2025.

On 27 July 2026, Sulzbacher moved to the Netherlands and signed a three-season contract with Excelsior.

== International career ==
Sulzbacher is a youth international for Austria, having played with teams from the under-19 to the under-21.

== Career statistics ==
As of match played 24 April 2026

Appearances and goals by club, season and competition
Club	Season	League			National cup		Europe		Other		Total	
Club	Season	Division	Apps	Goals	Apps	Goals	Apps	Goals	Apps	Goals	Apps	Goals
FC Liefering	2021–22	2. Liga	1	1	—		—		—		1	1
FC Liefering	2023–24	2. Liga	13	0	—		—		—		13	0
FC Liefering	2024–25	2. Liga	13	1	—		—		—		13	1
FC Liefering	2025–26	2. Liga	9	0	—		—		—		9	0
FC Liefering	Total		36	2	—		—		—		36	2
Red Bull Salzburg	2024–25	Austrian Bundesliga	6	0	—		—		1 (Note: Appearance in FIFA Club World Cup)	0	7	0
Red Bull Salzburg	2025–26	Austrian Bundesliga	1	0	0	0	0	0	—		1	0
Red Bull Salzburg	Total		7	0	0	0	0	0	1	0	8	0
Career total			43	2	0	0	0	0	1	0	44	2
