= Clauvis Etienne =

Senegalese footballer

Personal information
- Full name: Clauvis Etienne Carvalho
- Date of birth: 1 January 2003 (age 23)
- Place of birth: Dakar, Senegal
- Height: 1.92 m (6 ft 4 in)
- Position: Defensive midfielder

Team information
- Current team: FK Austria Wien

Youth career
- –2022: Jamono FC
- 2022: Brasilis
- 2023: São Paulo

Senior career*
Years	Team	Apps	(Gls)
2024	Pouso Alegre	0	(0)
2024	Uberaba	12	(1)
2025–	Austria Wien	0	(0)
2025	→ SV Stripfing (loan)	5	(0)
- * Club domestic league appearances and goals as of 18 May 2026

Clauvis Etienne (born 1 January 2003) is a Senegalese professional footballer who plays as a defensive midfielder for Austrian club Austria Wien.

== Career ==
Born in Dakar, Senegal, Clauvis Etienne is part of former football player Oscar Bernardi's project, which aims to bring talents from African countries to Brazil. Etienne arrived at São Paulo in 2023, where he played in the under-20 category. In February 2024, he was traded to Pouso Alegre. Without space, he went to Uberaba in the Campeonato Mineiro Second Division, becoming one of the team's highlights.

In September 2025, Etienne was announced by Austria Wien, and in sequence was loaned to the Austrian 2. Liga team SV Stripfing.
