= Kerim Alajbegović =

Bosnian footballer (born 2007)

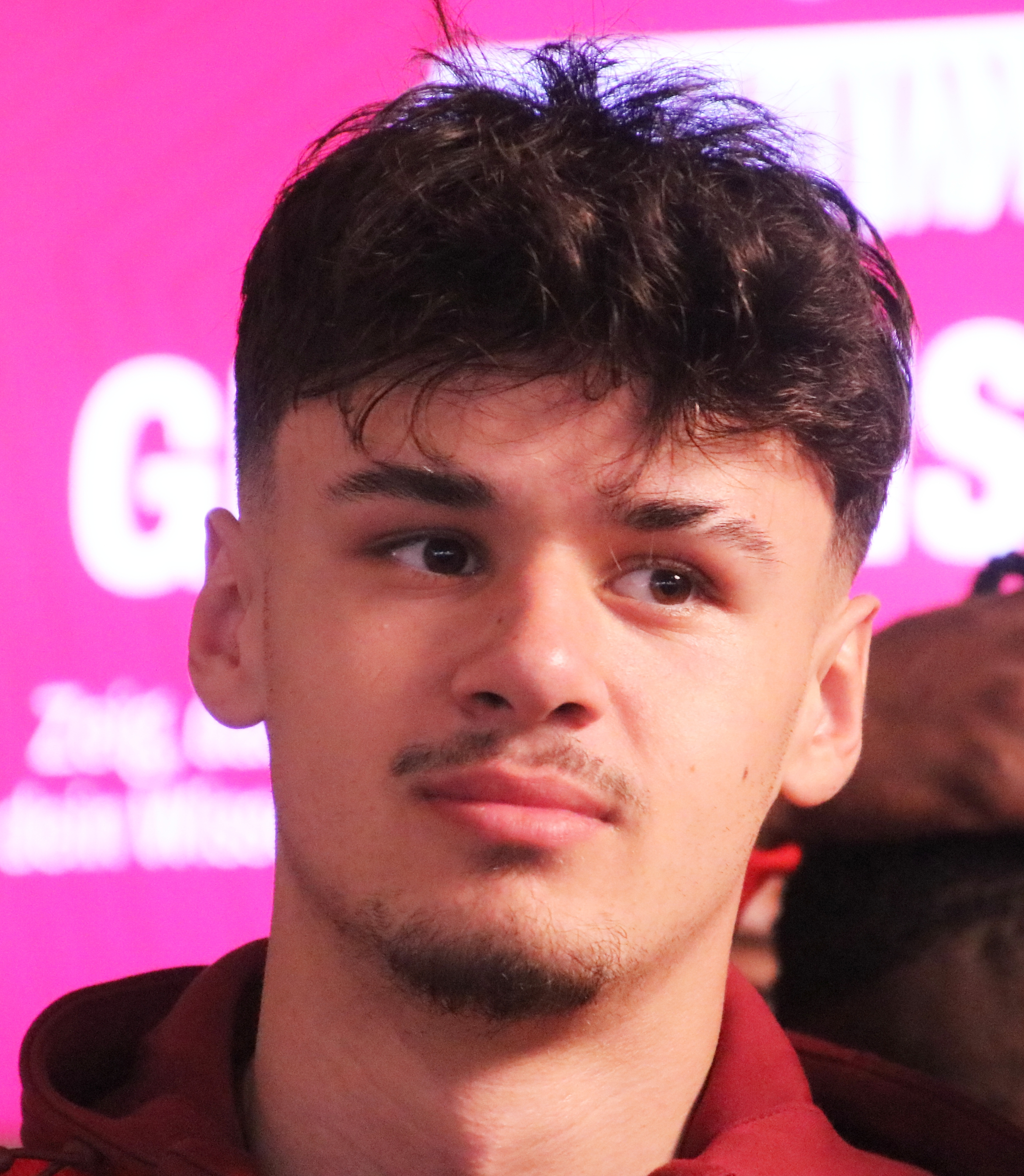
- Alajbegović in 2026

Personal information
- Date of birth: 21 September 2007 (age 19)
- Place of birth: Cologne, Germany
- Height: 1.86 m (6 ft 1 in)
- Position: Winger

Team information
- Current team: Juventus
- Number: 17

Youth career
- 2013–2021: 1. FC Köln
- 2021–2025: Bayer Leverkusen

Senior career*
Years	Team	Apps	(Gls)
2025–2026	Red Bull Salzburg	28	(9)
2026–	Juventus	11	(1)

International career^{‡}
2022	Bosnia and Herzegovina U15	4	(3)
2022–2024	Bosnia and Herzegovina U17	17	(6)
2024	Bosnia and Herzegovina U19	5	(2)
2024–2025	Bosnia and Herzegovina U21	4	(1)
2025–	Bosnia and Herzegovina	19	(3)
- * Club domestic league appearances and goals as of 22 November 2026 ‡ National team caps and goals as of 17 November 2026

Kerim Alajbegović (Bosnian: [kěrim alajbêːgoʋitɕ]; born 21 September 2007) is a professional footballer who plays as a winger for Serie A club Juventus. Born in Germany, he plays for the Bosnia and Herzegovina national team.

Alajbegović started his professional career at Red Bull Salzburg, before joining Bayer Leverkusen activated his buy back clause in 2026. He was later sold to Juventus.

A former youth international for Bosnia and Herzegovina, Alajbegović made his senior international debut in 2025, earning 19 caps since. He represented the nation at the 2026 FIFA World Cup.

== Club career ==
=== Bayer Leverkusen ===
Alajbegović started playing football at his hometown club 1. FC Köln, before joining Bayer Leverkusen's youth academy in 2021. In January 2025, he signed his first professional contract with the team.

=== Red Bull Salzburg ===
In July, Alajbegović was transferred to Austrian side Red Bull Salzburg for an undisclosed fee. He made his professional debut in a UEFA Champions League qualifier against Brann on 23 July at the age of 17. On 26 July, he scored his first professional goal in an Austrian Cup game against Union Dietach. He made his league debut against Ried on 2 August. On 9 August, he scored his first league goal in a triumph over Grazer AK.

In September, he extended his deal with the squad until June 2029.

Leverkusen

=== Juventus ===
In August 2026, after first being bought back by Bayer Leverkusen, Alajbegović moved to Italian outfit Juventus on a five-year contract.

==== 2026–27 season ====
He made his official debut for the team against Parma on 29 August. A week later, he started his first match for Juventus against Milan. On 17 September, he scored his first goal for Juventus in a UEFA Europa League match against NEC. Six weeks later, he scored his first league goal in a defeat of Napoli.

== International career ==
Alajbegović represented Bosnia and Herzegovina at all youth levels. He also served as a captain of the under-17 team under coach Nedim Jusufbegović.

In August 2025, he received his first senior call up, for 2026 FIFA World Cup qualifiers against San Marino and Austria. He debuted against the former on 6 September and managed to score a goal.

In June 2026, Alajbegović was named in Bosnia and Herzegovina's squad for the 2026 FIFA World Cup. He made his tournament debut in the opening group game against Canada on 12 June. On 24 June, he scored his first goal of the championship in a victory over Qatar.

== Personal life ==
Alajbegović is a practising Muslim; he visited a mosque in Sarajevo during the national team's concentration.

== Career statistics ==
=== Club ===
As of match played 22 November 2026

Appearances and goals by club, season and competition
Club	Season	League			National cup (Note: Includes Austrian Cup)		Continental		Total	
Club	Season	Division	Apps	Goals	Apps	Goals	Apps	Goals	Apps	Goals
Red Bull Salzburg	2025–26	Austrian Bundesliga	28	9	5	2	11 (Note: Four appearances in UEFA Champions League; seven appearances, two goals in UEFA Europa League)	2	44	13
Juventus	2026–27	Serie A	11	1	0	0	4 (Note: Appearances in UEFA Europa League)	1	15	2
Career total			39	10	5	2	15	3	59	15

=== International ===
As of match played 17 November 2026

Appearances and goals by national team and year
National team	Year	Apps	Goals
Bosnia and Herzegovina
Bosnia and Herzegovina	2025	6	1
Bosnia and Herzegovina	2026	13	2
Total		19	3

Scores and results list Bosnia and Herzegovina's goal tally first, score column indicates score after each Alajbegović goal.

List of international goals scored by Kerim Alajbegović
No.	Date	Venue	Cap	Opponent	Score	Result	Competition
1	6 September 2025	San Marino Stadium, Serravalle, San Marino	1	San Marino	5–0	6–0	2026 FIFA World Cup qualification
2	24 June 2026	Lumen Field, Seattle, United States	13	Qatar	1–0	3–1	2026 FIFA World Cup
3	2 October 2026	Bilino Polje, Zenica, Bosnia and Herzegovina	17	Sweden	1–1	1–1	2026–27 UEFA Nations League B
