= Maurits Kjærgaard =

Danish footballer (born 2003)

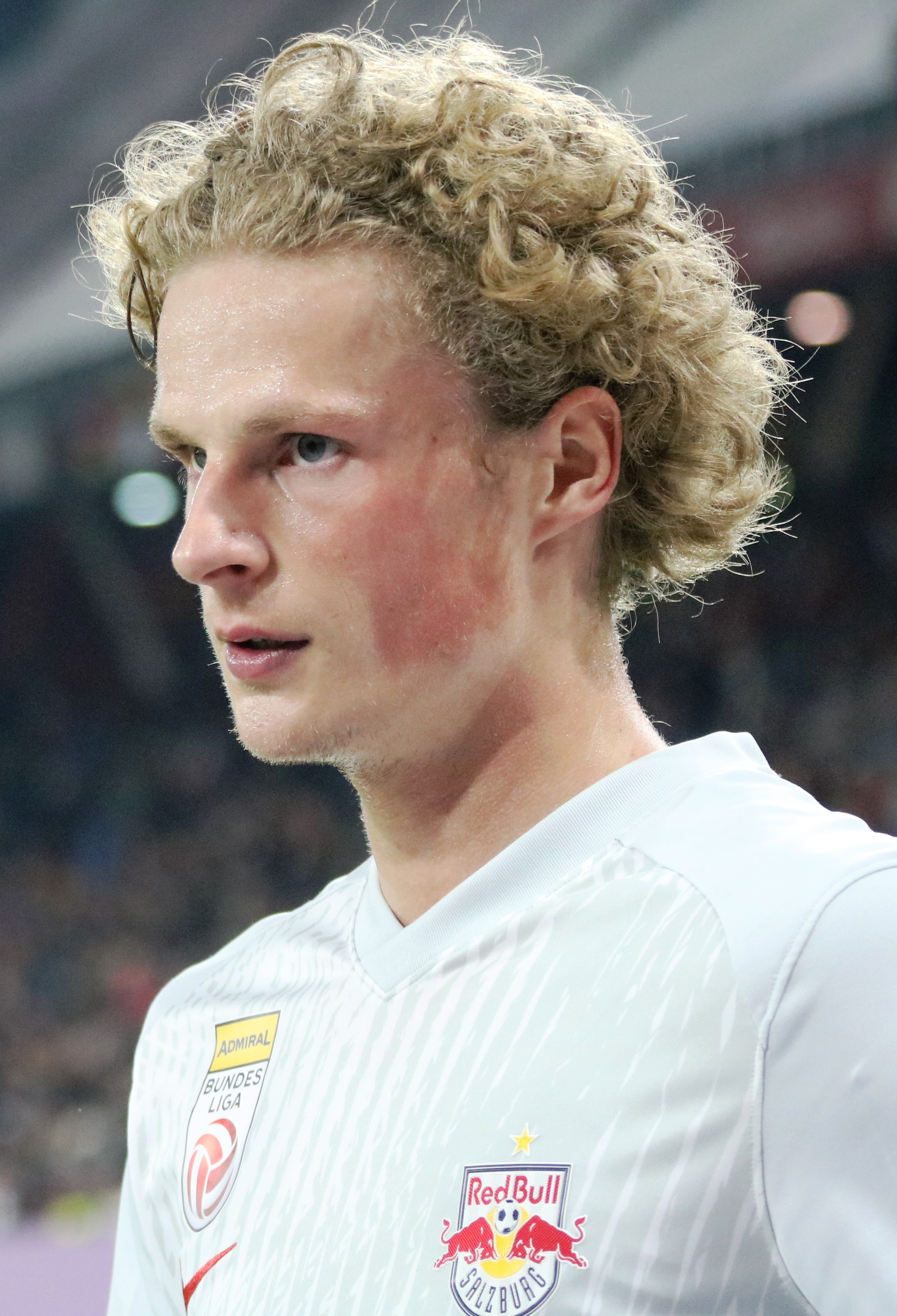
- Kjaergaard with Red Bull Salzburg in 2024

Personal information
- Full name: Maurits Kjaergaard
- Date of birth: 26 June 2003 (age 23)
- Place of birth: Herlev, Denmark
- Height: 1.92 m (6 ft 4 in)
- Position: Midfielder

Team information
- Current team: Lille
- Number: 14

Youth career
- 2017–2019: Lyngby

Senior career*
Years	Team	Apps	(Gls)
2019–2021	FC Liefering	47	(7)
2021–2026	Red Bull Salzburg	90	(8)
2026–	Lille	5	(0)

International career^{‡}
2018–2019	Denmark U16	6	(2)
2019–2020	Denmark U17	11	(1)
2020	Denmark U19	2	(0)
2022	Denmark U20	2	(0)
2021–2023	Denmark U21	19	(6)
- * Club domestic league appearances and goals as of 25 October 2026 ‡ National team caps and goals as of 11 September 2023

Maurits Kjærgaard (born 26 June 2003) is a Danish professional footballer who plays as a midfielder for Ligue 1 club Lille.

== Club career ==
In February 2021, Kjærgaard made his debut for Red Bull Salzburg. On 8 March 2022, he scored his first Champions League goal in a 7–1 away defeat to Bayern Munich in the 2021–22 season round of 16. Hence, he became the youngest Danish player to score in the competition, aged 18 years and 255 days.

On 1 September 2026, Kjærgaard signed a five-year contract with Ligue 1 club Lille.

== Career statistics ==
As of match played 3 November 2026

Appearances and goals by club, season and competition
Club	Season	League			Cup		Continental		Other		Total	
Club	Season	Division	Apps	Goals	Apps	Goals	Apps	Goals	Apps	Goals	Apps	Goals
FC Liefering	2019–20	2. Liga	13	2	—		—		—		13	2
FC Liefering	2020–21	2. Liga	28	3	—		—		—		28	3
FC Liefering	2021–22	2. Liga	6	2	—		—		—		6	2
FC Liefering	Total		47	7	0	0	0	0	0	0	47	7
Red Bull Salzburg	2020–21	Austrian Bundesliga	1	0	0	0	0	0	—		1	0
Red Bull Salzburg	2021–22	Austrian Bundesliga	17	2	4	1	4 (Note: Appearances in UEFA Champions League)	1	—		25	4
Red Bull Salzburg	2022–23	Austrian Bundesliga	26	2	3	0	7 (Note: Six appearances in UEFA Champions League, one appearance in UEFA Europa League)	0	—		36	2
Red Bull Salzburg	2023–24	Austrian Bundesliga	17	2	2	1	3	0	—		21	3
Red Bull Salzburg	2024–25	Austrian Bundesliga	6	0	1	1	5	4	2 (Note: Appearances in FIFA Club World Cup)	0	14	5
Red Bull Salzburg	2025–26	Austrian Bundesliga	20	2	3	1	9 (Note: Four appearances and two goals in UEFA Champions League, four appearances in UEFA Europa League)	2	—		32	5
Red Bull Salzburg	2026–27	Austrian Bundesliga	2	0	0	0	1 (Note: Appearance in UEFA Europa League)	0	—		3	0
Red Bull Salzburg	Total		90	8	13	4	29	7	2	0	132	19
Lille	2026–27	Ligue 1	5	0	0	0	4	0	—		9	0
Career total			141	15	13	4	33	7	2	0	189	26

== Honours ==
Red Bull Salzburg

- Austrian Bundesliga: 2020–21, 2021–22, 2022–23
- Austrian Cup: 2020–21, 2021–22
