= Dejan Radonjić (footballer, born 2005) =

Austrian footballer (born 2007)

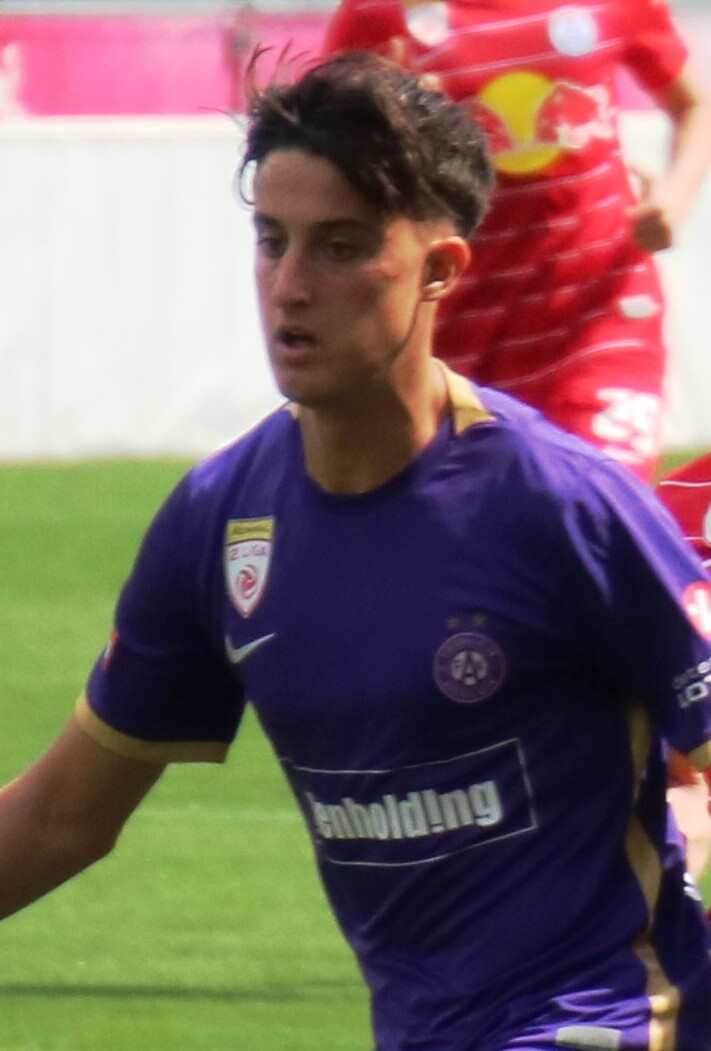
- Radonjić in 2023

Personal information
- Date of birth: 27 November 2005 (age 20)
- Place of birth: Vienna, Austria
- Height: 1.90 m (6 ft 3 in)
- Position: Centre-back

Team information
- Current team: SV Ried
- Number: 5

Youth career
- 2012–2013: Wiener Sport-Club
- 2013–2014: Admira Wacker
- 2014–2023: Austria Wien

Senior career*
Years	Team	Apps	(Gls)
2023–2026	Austria Wien II	33	(2)
2023–2025	→ SV Stripfing (loan)	37	(1)
2025–2026	Austria Wien	14	(1)
2026–	SV Ried	1	(0)

International career^{‡}
2022–2023	Austria U18	7	(0)
2023	Austria U19	4	(0)
- * Club domestic league appearances and goals as of 14 August 2026 ‡ National team caps and goals as of 18:22, 1 May 2026 (UTC)

Dejan Radonjić (born 27 November 2005) is an Austrian professional footballer who plays as a centre-back for Austrian Bundesliga club SV Ried.

== Club career ==
Radonjić is a product of the youth academies of the Austrian clubs Wiener Sport-Club, Admira Wacker and Austria Wien, and was promoted to the latter's reserves in 2023. On 28 June 2023, he signed with SV Stripfing on a co-operation basis. He made his senior and professional debut with Austria Wien as a substitute in a 2–1 Austrian Football Bundesliga loss to LASK on 17 August 2024. On 20 June 2025, he extended his contract with Austria Wien until 2027.

== International career ==
Born in Austria, Radonjić is of Serbian descent. A youth international for Austria, Radonjić played for the Austria U19s in 2023.
