= Elione Fernandes Neto =

Angolan footballer (born 2005)

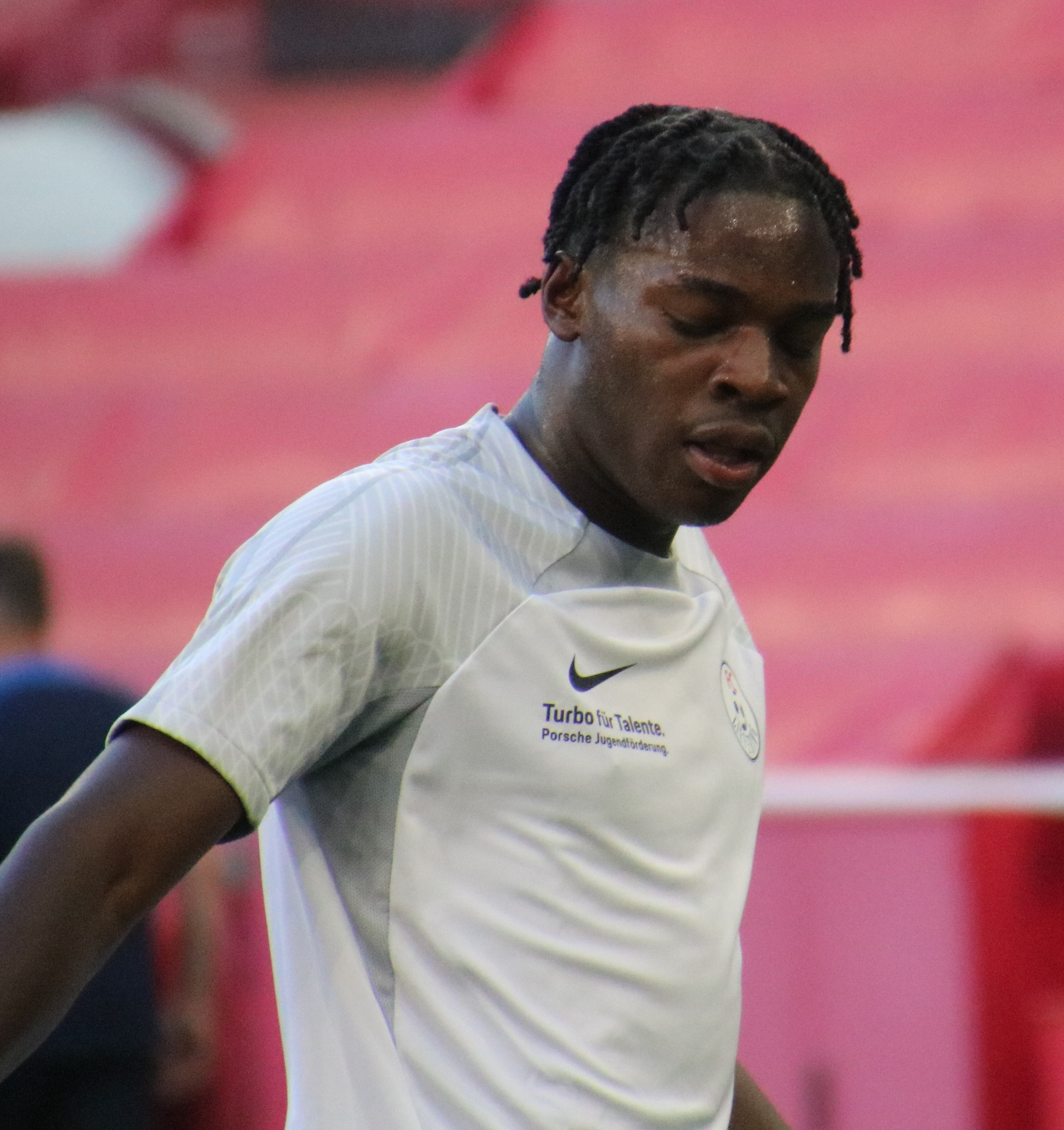
- Fernandes Neto in 2023

Personal information
- Date of birth: 17 August 2005 (age 21)
- Place of birth: Siegburg, Germany
- Height: 1.84 m (6 ft 0 in)
- Position: Defensive midfielder

Team information
- Current team: Hradec Králové
- Number: 19

Youth career
- 1. FC Köln
- 2019–2021: Fortuna Köln
- 2021–2022: Fortuna Düsseldorf

Senior career*
Years	Team	Apps	(Gls)
2022–2023	Fortuna Düsseldorf	12	(0)
2023	Fortuna Düsseldorf II	1	(0)
2023–2026	Red Bull Salzburg	0	(0)
2023–2026	→ FC Liefering (loan)	13	(0)
2026–	Hradec Králové	11	(0)
- * Club domestic league appearances and goals as of 27 May 2026

Elione Fernandes Neto (born 17 August 2005) is an Angolan professional footballer who plays as a defensive midfielder for Czech First League club Hradec Králové.

== Club career ==
Fernandes Neto is a youth product of 1. FC Köln, Fortuna Köln and Fortuna Düsseldorf. He made his senior and professional debut with Fortuna Düsseldorf as a late substitute in a 3–1 2. Bundesliga win over Hansa Rostock on 10 September 2023. Debuting at 17 years and 18 days old, Fernandes Neto is the youngest debutant in Fortuna Düsseldorf's history. On 17 August 2022, he signed his first professional contract with the club.

On 9 August 2023, Fernandes Neto signed a three-year contract with Red Bull Salzburg in Austria and was initially assigned as a co-operation player to FC Liefering.

On 13 February 2026, Fernandes Neto signed a multi-year contract with Czech First League club Hradec Králové.

== Personal life ==
Born in Siegburg, Germany, Fernandes Neto is of Angolan descent.

== Career statistics ==
As of match played 25 May 2025

Appearances and goals by club, season and competition
Club	Season	League			National cup (Note: Includes DFB-Pokal)		Total	
Club	Season	Division	Apps	Goals	Apps	Goals	Apps	Goals
Fortuna Düsseldorf	2022–23	2. Bundesliga	12	0	1	0	13	0
Fortuna Düsseldorf II	2022–23	Regionalliga West	1	0	—		1	0
FC Liefering (loan)	2023–24	Austrian Second League	11	0	—		11	0
FC Liefering (loan)	2024–25	Austrian Second League	2	0	—		2	0
FC Liefering (loan)	Total		13	0	—		13	0
Career total			26	0	1	0	27	0
