= Petar Ratkov =

Serbian footballer (2003)

Petar Ratkov Петар Ратков
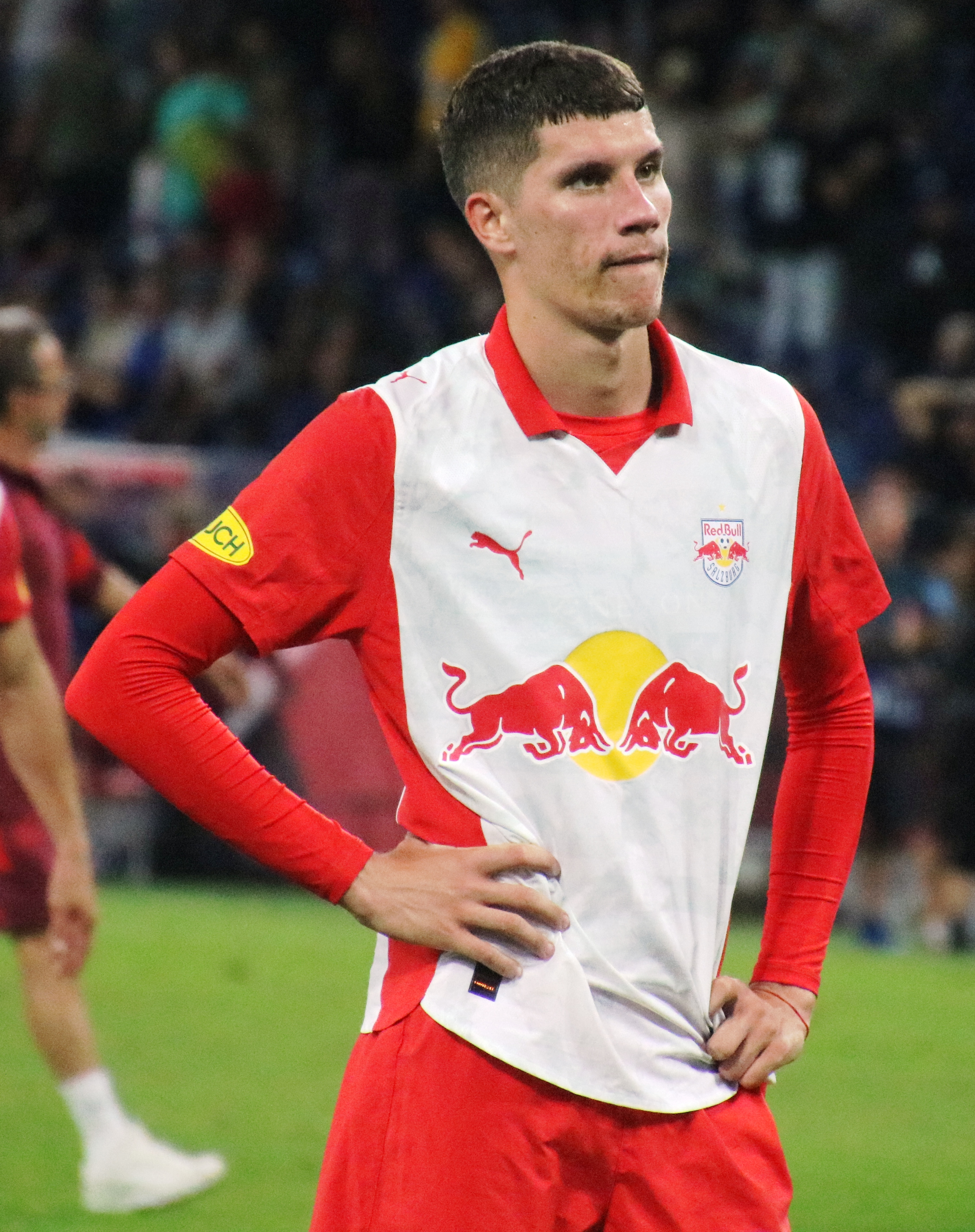
- Ratkov with Red Bull Salzburg in 2025

Personal information
- Date of birth: 18 August 2003 (age 23)
- Place of birth: Belgrade, Serbia and Montenegro
- Height: 1.93 m (6 ft 4 in)
- Position: Centre-forward

Team information
- Current team: Levante (on loan from Lazio)
- Number: 10

Youth career
- 2011–2020: DIF Belgrade
- 2020–2021: TSC

Senior career*
Years	Team	Apps	(Gls)
2021–2023	TSC	76	(16)
2023–2026	Red Bull Salzburg	63	(17)
2026–	Lazio	8	(0)
2026–	→ Levante (loan)	7	(0)

International career^{‡}
2021–2022	Serbia U19	8	(3)
2022–2023	Serbia U21	7	(2)
2023–	Serbia	3	(0)
- * Club domestic league appearances and goals as of 31 October 2026 ‡ National team caps and goals as of 8 September 2024

Petar Ratkov (Serbian Cyrillic: Петар Ратков; born 18 August 2003) is a Serbian professional footballer who plays as a centre-forward for La Liga club Levante, on loan from Serie A club Lazio, and the Serbia national team.

== Club career ==
Born in Belgrade, Ratkov grew up in Vojvodina and is a youth product of TSC. He started playing as a second striker before switching to a left-footed winger.

On 18 June 2023, Ratkov signed for reigning Austrian Bundesliga champions Red Bull Salzburg on a five-year contract. In total, he has made headlines with 22 goals in two-and-a-half seasons, showing particular brilliance in the 2024–25 Austrian Bundesliga with 12 goals.

On 8 January 2026, Ratkov moved to Serie A club Lazio for a fee of €13 million. He made his league debut for the club on 12 January in a 1–0 victory.

On 1 September 2026, Ratkov was loaned to La Liga side Levante, for one year. He made his debut in a 4–2 league defeat to Barcelona at Estadi Ciutat de València on 13 September 2026.

== International career ==
Ratkov is of mixed Bulgarian and Croatian descent. He holds both Serbian and Bulgarian citizenships, allowing him to represent either Serbia or Bulgaria. Ratkov was also eligible to play for Croatia through his mother's said descent.

In September 2023, he rejected a call-up for Bulgaria, committing himself to the Serbian national team. On 14 October, Ratkov eventually debuted for the Serbian football team in a UEFA Euro 2024 qualifying match against Hungary.

Ratkov was selected in Serbia's squad for the UEFA Euro 2024, but did not make an appearances in the tournament.

== Style of play ==
Ratkov has been analysed by the International Centre for Sports Studies (CIES) Football Observatory. In issue no. 375 of its weekly report, he was ranked 79th among the top 100 performing under-20 outfield players across 32 European leagues. CIES characterised his profile as that of a target-man striker with a primary emphasis on finishing, based on performance data across multiple areas of play, including aerial ability and shooting.

== Career statistics ==
=== Club ===
As of match played 31 October 2026

Appearances and goals by club, season and competition
Club	Season	League			National cup (Note: Includes Serbian Cup, Austrian Cup, Coppa Italia)		Europe		Other		Total	
Club	Season	Division	Apps	Goals	Apps	Goals	Apps	Goals	Apps	Goals	Apps	Goals
TSC	2020–21	Serbian SuperLiga	9	0	1	0	—		—		10	0
TSC	2021–22	Serbian SuperLiga	31	3	0	0	—		—		31	3
TSC	2022–23	Serbian SuperLiga	36	13	4	1	—		—		40	14
TSC	Total		76	16	5	1	—		—		81	17
Red Bull Salzburg	2023–24	Austrian Bundesliga	24	5	5	1	6 (Note: Appearances in UEFA Champions League)	0	—		35	6
Red Bull Salzburg	2024–25	Austrian Bundesliga	22	3	3	1	8	0	2 (Note: Appearances in FIFA Club World Cup)	0	35	4
Red Bull Salzburg	2025–26	Austrian Bundesliga	17	9	3	3	9 (Note: Three appearances in UEFA Champions League, six appearances in UEFA Europa League)	0	—		29	12
Red Bull Salzburg	Total		63	17	11	5	23	0	2	0	99	22
Lazio	2025–26	Serie A	8	0	0	0	—		—		8	0
Lazio	2026–27	Serie A	0	0	1	0	—		0	0	1	0
Lazio	Total		8	0	1	0	—		0	0	9	0
Levante	2026–27	La Liga	7	0	1	1	—		0	0	8	1
Career total			154	33	18	7	23	0	2	0	197	40

=== International ===
As of match played 8 September 2024

Appearances and goals by national team and year
National team	Year	Apps	Goals
Serbia	2023	1	0
Serbia	2024	2	0
Total		3	0
