= Moussa Yeo =

Malian footballer

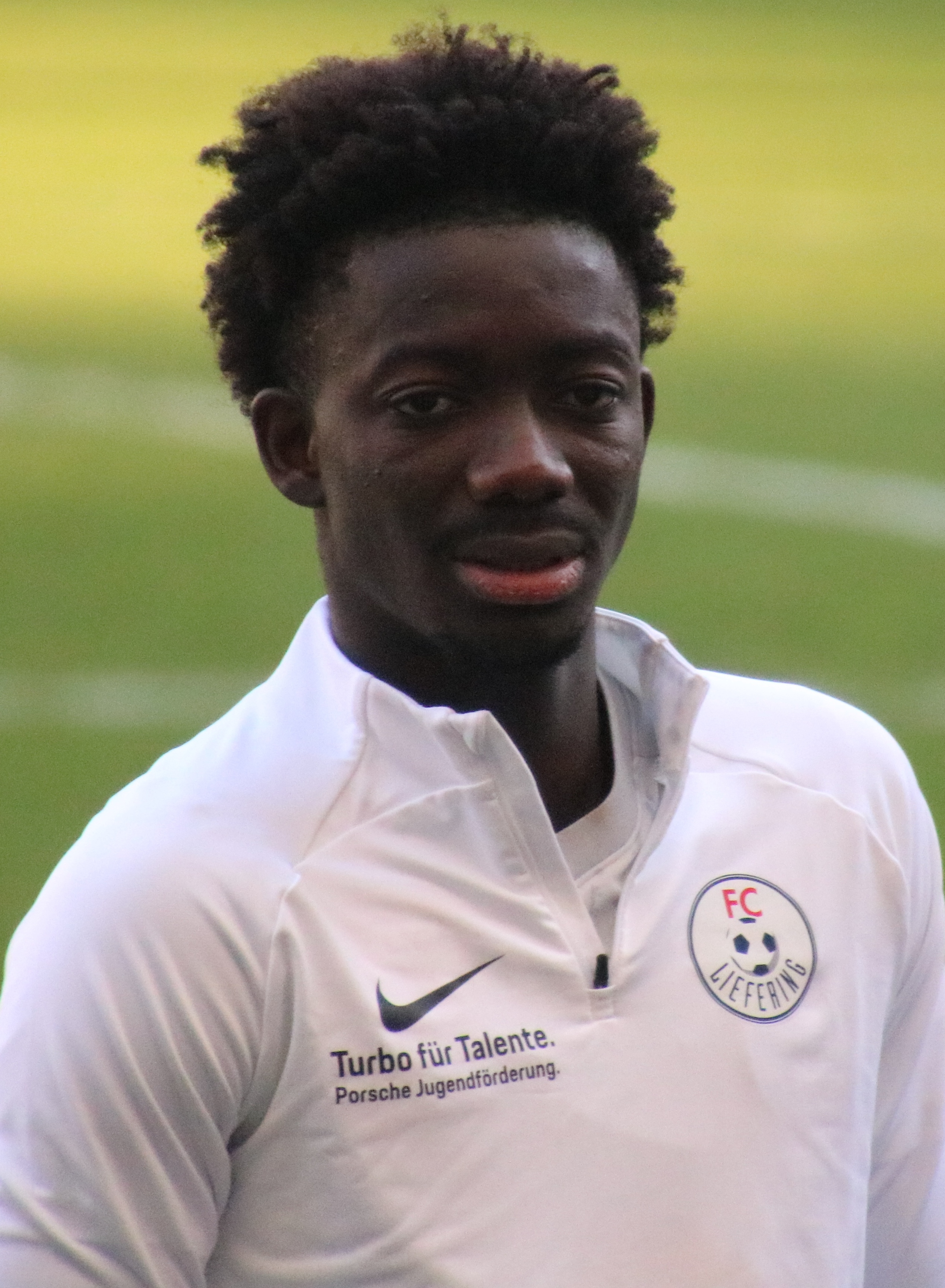
- Yeo in 2024

Personal information
- Full name: Moussa Kounfolo Yeo
- Date of birth: 1 June 2004 (age 22)
- Place of birth: Bamako, Mali
- Height: 1.74 m (5 ft 9 in)
- Position: Midfielder

Team information
- Current team: Swansea City
- Number: 49

Youth career
- 2019–2022: Guidars FC

Senior career*
Years	Team	Apps	(Gls)
2022–2026	Red Bull Salzburg	45	(7)
2022–2024	→ FC Liefering (loan)	33	(6)
2026–	Swansea City	11	(3)

International career^{‡}
2022–2023	Mali U20	5	(0)
2026–	Mali	1	(1)
- * Club domestic league appearances and goals as of 20:22, 17 October 2026 (UTC) ‡ National team caps and goals as of 13 November 2026

Moussa Kounfolo Yeo (born 1 June 2004) is a Malian professional footballer who plays as a midfielder for the EFL Championship club Swansea City and the Mali national team.

== Club career ==
Yeo is a youth product of the Malian club Guidars FC. On 7 August 2022, he transferred to the Austrian club Red Bull Salzburg on a 5-year contract, and was immediately loaned to their farm club FC Liefering. He made his debut with Salzburg as a substitute in a 5–1 Austrian Football Bundesliga win over TSV Hartberg on 12 May 2024. He formally returned to the senior Red Bull Salzburg side for the 2024–25 season.

=== Swansea City ===
On 1 July 2026, Yeo joined EFL Championship club Swansea City for an undisclosed fee, signing an initial four-year deal with the option for a further year. He had previously worked with his new head coach Vítor Matos, during the latter's stint as Red Bull Salzburg assistant manager two seasons previously, this relationship being credited as a key reason behind the move. On 12 September 2026, he scored his first goal for the club in a 3–1 victory over Burnley as the Swans moved into the automatic promotion places.

== International career ==
Yeo is a youth international for Mali, having played for the Mali U20s.

== Career statistics ==
=== Club ===
As of match played 12 September 2026

Appearances and goals by club, season and competition
Club	Season	League			National cup (Note: Includes Austrian Cup, FA Cup)		Europe		Other		Total	
Club	Season	Division	Apps	Goals	Apps	Goals	Apps	Goals	Apps	Goals	Apps	Goals
Red Bull Salzburg	2022–23	Austrian Bundesliga	0	0	0	0	0	0	—		0	0
Red Bull Salzburg	2023–24	Austrian Bundesliga	1	0	0	0	0	0	—		1	0
Red Bull Salzburg	2024–25	Austrian Bundesliga	22	6	3	0	10 (Note: Appearances in UEFA Champions League)	1	0	0	35	7
Red Bull Salzburg	2025–26	Austrian Bundesliga	22	1	4	1	8 (Note: Appearances in UEFA Europa League)	1	—		34	3
Red Bull Salzburg	Total		45	7	7	1	18	2	0	0	70	10
FC Liefering (loan)	2022–23	2. Liga	18	1	0	0	—		—		18	1
FC Liefering (loan)	2023–24	2. Liga	15	5	0	0	—		—		15	5
FC Liefering (loan)	Total		33	6	0	0	—		—		33	6
Swansea City	2026–27	EFL Championship	10	3	0	0	—		1 (Note: Appearance in EFL Cup)	0	11	3
Career total			85	13	7	1	18	2	1	0	111	17

=== International ===
As of match played 13 November 2026

Appearances and goals by national team and year
National team	Year	Apps	Goals
Mali	2026	1	1
Total		1	1

As of match played 13 November 2026
Scores and results list Mali's goal tally first, score column indicates score after each Yeo goal.

List of international goals scored by Moussa Yeo
No.	Date	Venue	Opponent	Score	Result	Competition
1	13 November 2026	26 March Stadium, Bamako, Mali	Rwanda	2–2	3–2	2027 Africa Cup of Nations qualification
