= Luca Pazourek =

Austrian footballer (born 2007)

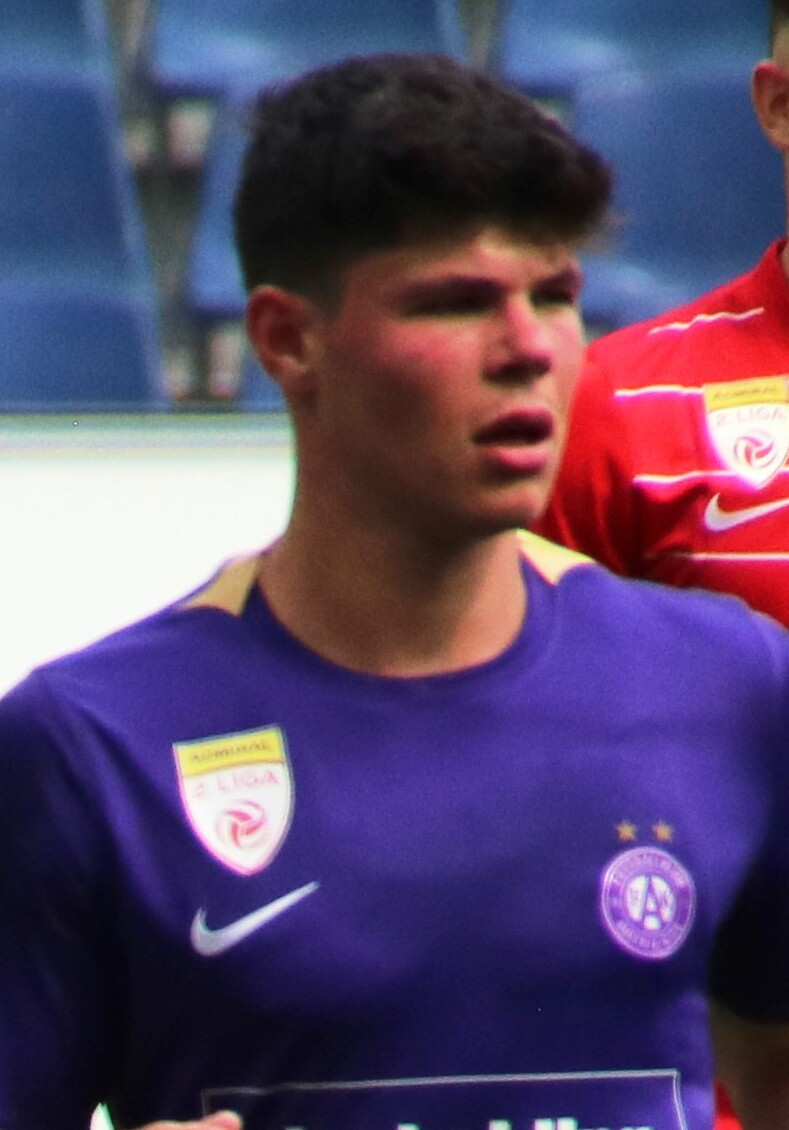
- Pazourek in 2023

Personal information
- Date of birth: 6 May 2004 (age 22)
- Place of birth: Vienna, Austria
- Height: 1.78 m (5 ft 10 in)
- Position: Right-back

Team information
- Current team: TSV Hartberg (on loan from Austria Wien)
- Number: 2

Youth career
- 2013–2016: Wiener Sport-Club
- 2016–2021: Austria Wien

Senior career*
Years	Team	Apps	(Gls)
2021–2025	Austria Wien II	53	(4)
2023–2025	→ SV Stripfing (loan)	19	(3)
2024–	Austria Wien	17	(0)
2026–	→ TSV Hartberg (loan)	13	(2)

International career^{‡}
2021–2022	Austria U17	5	(0)
2022–2023	Austria U18	8	(0)
2023–2024	Austria U19	8	(0)
2024–2025	Austria U21	7	(0)
- * Club domestic league appearances and goals as of 10 June 2026 ‡ National team caps and goals as of 18:22, 1 May 2026 (UTC)

Luca Pazourek (born 6 May 2004) is an Austrian professional footballer who plays as a right-back for Austrian Bundesliga club TSV Hartberg, on loan from Austria Wien.

== Club career ==
Pazourek is a product of the youth academies of the Austrian clubs Wiener Sport-Club and Austria Wien. On 30 March 2022, he signed a youth contract with Austria Wien and was promoted to their reserves.

He had a loan stint with SV Stripfing as a cooperation player in 2023 and 2024.

On 6 January 2026, he joined TSV Hartberg on loan a season-and-a-half, until the summer of 2027.

== International career ==
A youth international for Austria, Pazourek was first called up to the Austria U21s in March 2024.
