= 2026–27 FK Austria Wien season =

FK Austria Wien
2026–27 season
- Manager: Stephan Helm (until 24 October); Maximilian Uhlig (caretaker from 24 October)
- Stadium: Franz Horr Stadium
- Austrian Football Bundesliga: 11th
- Austrian Cup: Third round
- UEFA Conference League: Play-off round
- Top goalscorer: League: Johannes Eggestein (3); All: Johannes Eggestein (10)
- Highest home attendance: 14,368 (vs. Sturm Graz, 10 October 2026)
- Lowest home attendance: 7,663 (vs. Beitar Jerusalem, 13 August 2026)
- Average home league attendance: 12,683
- Biggest win: 6–0 (vs. FCM Traiskirchen, 5 September 2026)
- Biggest defeat: 3–0 (vs. Wolfsberger AC, 2 August 2026); 4–1 (vs. Red Bull Salzburg, 30 August 2026)
- All statistics correct as of 1 November 2026.

The 2026–27 season is the 115th season in the history of FK Austria Wien, and the club's 82nd consecutive season in the Austrian Football Bundesliga. In addition to the domestic league, the team participated in the Austrian Cup and the UEFA Conference League.

== Transfers ==
=== In ===
Pos.	Player	Transferred from	Fee	Date	Source
DF	(Germany) Jonas Feddersen	(Germany) Borussia Dortmund II	Free	10 June 2026	
FW	(Germany) Julian Hettwer	(Germany) Fortuna Düsseldorf	Free	24 June 2026	
DF	(Nigeria) Ibrahim Buhari	(Sweden) Elfsborg	Free	8 July 2026	
MF	(Austria) Valentino Müller		Free	8 September 2026	

=== Out ===
Pos.	Player	Transferred to	Fee	Date	Source
FW	(Austria) Marko Raguž	(Austria) SCR Altach	Free	18 May 2026	
FW	(Austria) Konstantin Aleksa	(Germany) TSG Hoffenheim	€1,000,000	28 May 2026	
FW	(Austria) Romeo Vučić	(Austria) Blau-Weiß Linz	Undisclosed	20 June 2026	
MF	(The Gambia) Abubakr Barry	(Austria) Red Bull Salzburg	€3,000,000	29 June 2026	
DF	(Austria) Ifeanyi Ndukwe	(England) Liverpool	€3,000,000	1 July 2026 (Note: Deal was originally agreed on 26 January 2026, but was not completed until 1 July)	
DF	(France) Hakim Guenouche		Released	1 July 2026	
DF	(Croatia) Tin Plavotić	(Poland) Motor Lublin	Free	24 July 2026	
DF	(Austria) Dejan Radonjić	(Austria) SV Ried	€200,000	1 August 2026	
FW	(Austria) Moritz Wels	(Austria) WSG Tirol	Undisclosed	3 September 2026	

== Friendlies ==
26 June 2026 Friendly	SC/ESV Parndorf	0–4	Austria Wien	Parndorf
17:00			Maybach 5'; Markovic 15', 44'; Hettwer 70'	Stadium: Heidebodenstadion

3 July 2026 Friendly	Mattersburger SV	3–1	Austria Wien	Mattersburg
18:00				Stadium: Pappelstadion

4 July 2026 Friendly	Austria Wien	1–1	Debrecen	Vienna
14:00	Eggestein 38' (pen.)		Baldoni 22'	Stadium: Franz Horr Stadium

8 July 2026 Friendly	Austria Wien	1–1	DAC 1904	Vienna
17:00	Fischer 39'		Gagua 68'	Stadium: Franz Horr Stadium

11 July 2026 Friendly	SKN St. Pölten	0–2	Austria Wien	Sankt Pölten
17:10			Schablas 54'; Eggestein 58'	Stadium: NV Arena

17 July 2026 Friendly	Austria Wien	4–1	Paks	Vienna
19:00	Šaljić 16'; Fischer 52'; Wels 65'; Hettwer 68'		Silye 53'	Stadium: Franz Horr Stadium

== Competitions ==
=== Overall record ===
Competition	First match	Last match	Starting round	Final position	Record							
Competition	First match	Last match	Starting round	Final position	Pld	W	D	L	GF	GA	GD	Win %
Austrian Football Bundesliga	2 August 2026		Matchday 1		11	2	1	8	10	22	−12	18.18
Austrian Cup	26 July 2026	27 October 2026	First round	Third round	3	2	1	0	12	1	+11	66.67
UEFA Conference League	23 July 2026	27 August 2026	Second qualifying round	Play-off round	6	3	1	2	8	6	+2	50.00
Total					20	7	3	10	30	29	+1	35.00

Last updated: 1 November 2026
Source: Soccerway

=== Austrian Football Bundesliga ===
==== League table ====
Pos	Team	Pld	W	D	L	GF	GA	GD	Pts	Qualification
8	Austria Lustenau	12	3	2	7	15	30	−15	11	Qualification for the Relegation round
9	Grazer AK	12	2	4	6	9	29	−20	10	Qualification for the Relegation round
10	SCR Altach	12	3	1	8	11	20	−9	10	Qualification for the Relegation round
11	Austria Wien	12	2	2	8	11	23	−12	8	Qualification for the Relegation round
12	Wolfsberger	12	1	3	8	8	26	−18	6	Qualification for the Relegation round

Updated to match(es) played on 8 November 2026. Source: Austrian Football Bundesliga
Rules for classification: 1) Points; 2) Head-to-head record; 3) Goal difference; 4) Goals scored; 5) Matches won; 6) Away matches won; 7) Away goals scored.

==== Results summary ====
Overall								Home						Away					
Pld	W	D	L	GF	GA	GD	Pts	W	D	L	GF	GA	GD	W	D	L	GF	GA	GD
11	2	1	8	10	22	−12	7	1	0	4	2	8	−6	1	1	4	8	14	−6

Last updated: 1 November 2026.
Source: ADMIRAL Bundesliga

==== Results by round ====
Round	1	2	3	4	5	6	7	8	9	10	11
Ground	A	H	A	H	A	H	A	H	A	A	H
Result	L	L	W	L	L	W	D	L	L	L	L
Position	11	12	8	12	12	8	10	10	10	11	11

Updated to match(es) played on 1 November 2026. Source: ADMIRAL Bundesliga
A = Away; H = Home; W = Win; D = Draw; L = Loss

==== Matches ====
2 August 2026 1	Wolfsberger AC	3–0	Austria Wien	Wolfsberg
17:00 CEST	Vrioni 18' (pen.), 63' (pen.); Wimmer (yellow card) 31'; Schwarz 49'; Polster (yellow card) 89'	Report	Nnodim (yellow card) 85'	Stadium: Lavanttal-Arena; Attendance: 4,930; Referee: (Austria) Alexander Harkam

9 August 2026 2	Austria Wien	0–2	LASK	Wien
19:00 CEST	Dragović (red card) 82'; Handl (yellow card) 86'; Ranftl (yellow card) 86'	Report	Andrade 54'; Usor 83'; Adeniran (yellow card) 89'; Mbuyamba (yellow card) 90'	Stadium: Generali Arena; Attendance: 12,442; Referee: (Austria) Arnes Talic

16 August 2026 3	TSV Hartberg	0–2	Austria Wien	Hartberg
17:00 CEST	Gattermayer (yellow card) 14'; Coulibaly (yellow card) 45+1'	Report	Nnodim 33'; Boateng (yellow card) 60'; Hettwer 76'	Stadium: Profertil Arena Hartberg; Attendance: 3,620; Referee: (Austria) Emil Ristoskov

30 August 2026 5	Red Bull Salzburg	4–1	Austria Wien	Wals-Siezenheim
19:00 CEST	K. Lee 13' (o.g.); Tabaković 19'; Mazurek 31'; Schmid (yellow card) 39'; Vertessen 55'	Report	Fischer 47'; Schablas (yellow card) 90+3'	Stadium: Red Bull Arena; Attendance: 10,531; Referee: (Austria) Walter Altmann

2 September 2026 4	Austria Wien	0–1	WSG Tirol	Wien
18:30 CEST	Dragović (yellow card) 69'; K. Lee (yellow card) 81'; Schablas (yellow card) 90+4'	Report	Murray (yellow card) 35', (goal) 66'; Striednig (yellow card) 79'	Stadium: Generali Arena; Attendance: 11,151; Referee: (Austria) Harald Lechner

13 September 2026 6	Austria Wien	2–1	Austria Lustenau	Wien
14:30 CEST	Hettwer 82'; Boateng 90+2'	Report	Weixelbraun 46'; Pertlwieser (yellow card) 86'	Stadium: Generali Arena; Attendance: 11,990; Referee: (Austria) Christian-Petru Ciochirca

19 September 2026 7	Grazer AK	2–2	Austria Wien	Graz
19:30 CEST	Hofleitner 15', (yellow card) 49'; Italiano 55'; Klassen (yellow card) 58'; Oberleitner (yellow card) 64'; Michorl (yellow card) 81'; Sollbauer (yellow card) 90+3'	Report	Ranftl (yellow card) 16'; Fischer 45'; Handl (yellow card) 72'; K. Lee 81'; Wustinger (yellow card) 87'	Stadium: Liebenauer Stadium; Attendance: 5,530; Referee: (Austria) Arnes Talic

10 October 2026 8	Austria Wien	0–2	Sturm Graz	Wien
19:30 CEST	Nnodim (yellow card) 77'	Report	Diakité 45+1', 55'; Weinhandl (yellow card) 66'; Balbo (yellow card) 90'	Stadium: Generali Arena; Attendance: 14,351; Referee: (Austria) Walter Altmann

17 October 2026 9	SV Ried	3–2	Austria Wien	Ried im Innkreis
19:30 CEST	Schwab 23', (yellow card) 68'; Rhodes (yellow card) 24'; Pomer 29'; Bajić (yellow card) 56'; Maart (yellow card) 79'; Thelin 83' (pen.)	Report	Eggestein 18', 90+2'	Stadium: BWT X Upper Austrian Arena; Attendance: 5,583; Referee: (Austria) Manuel Baumann

23 October 2026 10	SCR Altach	2–1	Austria Wien	Altach
19:30 CET	Massombo (yellow card) 16', (goal) 80'; Greil 70'	Report	Eggestein 40'; K. Lee (yellow card) 69'; Handl (yellow card) 70'; Buhari (yellow card) 87'	Stadium: Stadion Schnabelholz; Attendance: 4,245; Referee: (Austria) Arnes Talic

1 November 2026 11	Austria Wien	0–2	Rapid Wien	Wien
17:00 CET	Vorsager (yellow card) 74'; Marković (yellow card) 76'	Report	Demir 60' (pen.), (yellow card) 62'; T. Lee 82' (o.g.); Horn (yellow card) 82'; Mbuyi (yellow card) 90+4'	Stadium: Generali Arena; Attendance: 13,463; Referee: (Austria) Stefan Ebner

=== Austrian Cup ===
26 July 2026 First round	Wiener Sport-Club	0–5	Austria Wien	Wien
18:00	Radulovic (yellow card) 45'	Report	Eggestein 2', 56', 58'; Ranftl (yellow card) 43'; Šaljić 50'; Deshishku 75'	Stadium: Sportclub-Platz; Attendance: 5,617; Referee: Emil Ristoskov

5 September 2026 Second round	FCM Traiskirchen	0–6	Austria Wien	Traiskirchen
17:30	Felber (yellow card) 10'; Klar (yellow card) 53'; Pfaffl (yellow card) 64'	Report	Deshishku 22'; Eggestein 29', 30', 90+3'; Nnodim 39'; Maybach (yellow card) 43'; Ranftl (yellow card) 58'; Hettwer 90+1'	Stadium: ARBÖ-Arena; Attendance: 3,500; Referee: Achim Untergasser

27 October 2026 Third round	Austria Wien	1–1 (a.e.t.) (3–5 p)	TSV Hartberg	Wien
18:00	Eggestein 26'; Fischer (yellow card) 30'; Buhari (yellow card) 35'; Boateng (yellow card) 111'	Report	Lukić 44'; Coulibaly (yellow card) 67'; Diarra (yellow card) 90+3'; Spendlhofer (yellow card) 92'; Dalpiaz (yellow card) 95'	Stadium: Generali Arena; Attendance: 11,355; Referee: Harald Lechner
	Penalties
	Wustinger (penalty scored); Müller (penalty missed); Nnodim (penalty scored); T. Lee (penalty scored)		Markuš (penalty scored); Karner (penalty scored); Urrutia (penalty scored); Diarra (penalty scored); Spendlhofer (penalty scored)

=== UEFA Conference League ===
==== Second qualifying round ====
The draw was held on 17 June 2026.

23 July 2026 First leg	Liepāja (Latvia)	0–2	Austria Wien	Jūrmala, Latvia
21:30 UTC+2	Haidara (yellow card) 33'; Isajevs (yellow card) 70'	Report	Šaljić (yellow card) 16'; Wustinger 31'; Wels 55'	Stadium: Slokas Stadions; Attendance: 1,368; Referee: Helgi Mikael Jonasson (Iceland)

30 July 2026 Second leg	Austria Wien	3–1 (5–1 agg.)	(Latvia) Liepāja	Wien
20:30 UTC+1	Wustinger (yellow card) 11'; Feddersen 20'; Boateng 29'; Ranftl 66'	Report	Haidara 4'; Martins (red card) 8'; Strumia (yellow card) 16'; Ekou (yellow card) 34'	Stadium: Generali Arena; Attendance: 8,300; Referee: Luca Zufferli (Italy)

==== Third qualifying round ====
The draw was held on 20 July 2026.

6 August 2026 First leg	Beitar Jerusalem (Israel)	1–2	Austria Wien	Ploiești, Romania
20:30 UTC+2	Muche 20'; Carabalí (yellow card) 45+3'; Takang (yellow card) 75'; Gadrani (yellow card) 79'; Kalu (yellow card) 90+2'	Report	Maybach (yellow card) 27'; Markovic 45'; Šaljić 70'; Ranftl (yellow card) 83'; Schablas (yellow card) 87'	Stadium: Ilie Oană Stadium; Attendance: 1,450; Referee: Lawrence Visser (Belgium)

13 August 2026 Second leg	Austria Wien	1–2 (a.e.t.) (3–3 agg.) (4–2 p)	(Israel) Beitar Jerusalem	Wien
20:30 UTC+1	Boateng 58'; Schablas (yellow card) 70'; Ranftl (yellow card) 92'; T. Lee (yellow card) 111'; Wustinger (yellow card) 113'	Report	Takang (yellow card) 25'; Atzili 33', (yellow card) 63'; Kalu 56'; Yosefi (yellow card) 99'; Antwi (yellow card) 114'	Stadium: Generali Arena; Attendance: 7,663; Referee: Lukasz Kuzma (Poland)
	Penalties
	Fischer (penalty scored); T. Lee (penalty scored); Ranftl (penalty scored); Markovic (penalty missed); Šaljić (penalty scored)		Carabalí (penalty scored); Yosefi (penalty scored); Ansah (penalty missed); Muzie (penalty missed)

==== Play-off round ====
The draw was held on 3 August 2026.

20 August 2026 First leg	Braga (Portugal)	2–0	Austria Wien	Braga, Portugal
20:00 UTC+0	Víctor 25' (pen.), (penalty missed) 84', (yellow card) 87'; Martínez (yellow card) 76'; Rodrigues 88'	Report		Stadium: Estádio Municipal de Braga; Attendance: 14,293; Referee: Ishmael Barbara (Malta)

27 August 2026 Second leg	Austria Wien	0–0 (0–2 agg.)	(Portugal) Braga	Wien
20:30 UTC+1	Fischer (yellow card) 29'; Lee Tae-seok (yellow card) 34'; Boateng (yellow card) 45+1'	Report	Navarro (yellow card) 30'; Moutinho (yellow card) 78'	Stadium: Generali Arena; Attendance: 9,702; Referee: Nikola Dabanović (Montenegro)

== Statistics ==
=== Appearances and goals ===
As of match played 1 November 2026

Players with no appearances are not included on the list
Italics indicate a loaned in player

No.	Pos	Nat	Player	Total		Bundesliga		Austrian Cup		UEFA Conference League	
No.	Pos	Nat	Player	Apps	Goals	Apps	Goals	Apps	Goals	Apps	Goals
1	GK	(Austria) AUT	Samuel Şahin-Radlinger	17	0	11+0	0	0+0	0	6+0	0
2	DF	(Austria) AUT	Wilhelm Vorsager	2	0	1+0	0	1+0	0	0+0	0
3	DF	(Nigeria) NGR	Ibrahim Buhari	13	0	7+0	0	1+1	0	4+0	0
4	DF	(Germany) GER	Jonas Feddersen	8	1	2+2	0	0+0	0	4+0	1
5	MF	(Austria) AUT	Valentino Müller	7	0	6+0	0	1+0	0	0+0	0
6	DF	(Austria) AUT	Philipp Maybach	12	0	3+1	0	2+1	0	4+1	0
7	MF	(Austria) AUT	Vasilije Markovic	17	1	7+3	0	1+0	0	5+1	1
10	MF	(Austria) AUT	Sanel Šaljić	18	2	7+4	0	2+0	1	1+4	1
14	FW	(Ghana) GHA	Kelvin Boateng	18	3	3+8	1	0+2	0	4+1	2
15	DF	(Austria) AUT	Aleksandar Dragović	15	0	7+0	0	3+0	0	3+2	0
16	MF	(South Korea) KOR	Lee Kang-hee	14	1	4+4	1	2+0	0	3+1	0
17	DF	(South Korea) KOR	Lee Tae-seok	16	0	9+1	0	3+0	0	2+1	0
19	FW	(Germany) GER	Johannes Eggestein	18	10	10+1	3	3+0	7	3+1	0
20	FW	(Germany) GER	Julian Hettwer	20	3	4+7	2	0+3	1	5+1	0
21	DF	(Austria) AUT	Matteo Schablas	11	0	1+4	0	0+1	0	4+1	0
22	MF	(Austria) AUT	Florian Wustinger	17	1	4+5	0	0+2	0	3+3	1
26	DF	(Austria) AUT	Reinhold Ranftl	19	1	11+0	0	1+1	0	4+2	1
30	MF	(Austria) AUT	Manfred Fischer	19	2	8+3	2	3+0	0	5+0	0
40	DF	(Germany) GER	Daniel Nnodim	16	2	6+3	1	3+0	1	2+2	0
44	DF	(Austria) AUT	Valentin Toifl	4	0	0+0	0	0+2	0	0+2	0
46	DF	(Austria) AUT	Johannes Handl	18	0	9+2	0	1+2	0	3+1	0
74	FW	(Austria) AUT	Hasan Deshishku	7	2	0+2	0	1+1	2	0+3	0
99	GK	(Austria) AUT	Mirko Kos	3	0	0+0	0	3+0	0	0+0	0
Player(s) who featured but departed the club permanently during the season:
37	MF	(Austria) AUT	Moritz Wels	6	1	1+0	0	1+0	0	1+3	1
60	DF	(Austria) AUT	Dejan Radonjić	1	0	0+0	0	1+0	0	0+0	0
