= Janotka =

Janotka (feminine: Janotková) is a Czech and Slovak surname derived from a diminutive of the given name Jan. Notable people with the surname include:

- Ferdinand Janotka (born 1945), Austrian footballer and manager
- Tomáš Janotka (born 1982), Czech footballer
