= Vasilije Marković =

Austrian footballer

Personal information
- Date of birth: 12 May 2008 (age 18)
- Place of birth: Vienna, Austria
- Height: 1.82 m (6 ft 0 in)
- Position: Midfielder

Team information
- Current team: Austria Wien
- Number: 36

Youth career
- 2015–2018: TWL Elektra
- 2018–2025: Austria Wien

Senior career*
Years	Team	Apps	(Gls)
2025–	Austria Wien II	3	(1)
2026–	Austria Wien	20	(0)

International career^{‡}
2023	Austria U15	4	(0)
2024	Austria U16	5	(0)
2024–2025	Austria U17	20	(1)
2026–	Austria U21	3	(0)
2026–	Austria	1	(0)
- * Club domestic league appearances and goals as of 10 October 2026 ‡ National team caps and goals as of 27 September 2026

Vasilije Marković (Serbian Cyrillic: Василије Марковић; born 12 May 2008) is an Austrian professional footballer who plays as a midfielder for the Austrian Bundesliga club Austria Wien and the Austria national team.

== Club career ==
Marković is a product of the youth academies of the Austrian clubs TWL Elektra and Austria Wien. On 4 February 2026, he signed his first professional contract with Austria Wien until 2028. He made his senior and professional debut with Austria Wien as a substitute in a 2–0 Austrian Football Bundesliga win over Red Bull Salzburg on 6 February 2026.

== International career ==
Marković is an Austria youth international, having represented the U15, U16 and U17 teams.

In September 2026, he was one of the players who were called up to the Austria national team by head coach Ralf Rangnick, for the 2026–27 UEFA Nations League B matches against Israel, Kosovo (twice) and Republic of Ireland on 24, 27 September, 1 and 4 October 2026.

== Personal life ==
Born in Austria, Marković is of Serbian descent. He was part of the Austria U17s that came in second at the 2025 FIFA U-17 World Cup.

== Career statistics ==
=== Club ===
As of match played 10 October 2026

Appearances and goals by club, season and competition
Club	Season	League			Cup		Europe		Other		Total	
Club	Season	Division	Apps	Goals	Apps	Goals	Apps	Goals	Apps	Goals	Apps	Goals
Austria Wien II	2025–26	2. Liga	3	1	—		—		—		3	1
Austria Wien	2025–26	Austrian Bundesliga	13	0	—		—		—		13	0
Austria Wien	2026–27	Austrian Bundesliga	7	0	0	0	6 (Note: Appearances in UEFA Conference League)	1	—		13	1
Austria Wien	Total		20	0	0	0	6	1	0	0	26	1
Career total			23	1	0	0	6	1	0	0	29	2

=== International ===
As of match played 27 September 2026

Appearances and goals by national team and year
National team	Year	Apps	Goals
Austria	2026	1	0
Total		1	0
