= Karl Stotz =

Austrian footballer

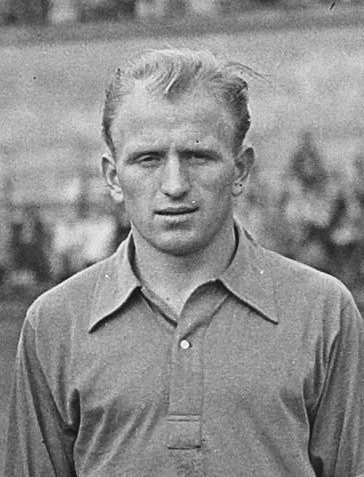
- Stotz in 1953

Personal information
- Full name: Karl Stotz
- Date of birth: 27 March 1927
- Place of birth: Vienna, Austria
- Date of death: 4 April 2017 (aged 90)
- Place of death: Seefeld in Tirol, Austria
- Position: Defender

Senior career*
Years	Team	Apps	(Gls)
1948–1951	FC Wien	63	(8)
1951–1963	Austria Wien	299	(22)
Total		362	(30)

International career
1950–1962	Austria	42	(1)

Managerial career
- 1972: Austria Wien
- 1976–1977: Austria Wien
- 1978–1981: Austria
- 1987: Austria Wien
Medal record
Representing Austria
FIFA World Cup
Third place	1954 Switzerland
- * Club domestic league appearances and goals

Karl Stotz (27 March 1927 – 4 April 2017) was an Austrian football player from Vienna.

As a young soldier, he fought in the Battle of Stalingrad, was captured in 1944 and only returned home in 1948.

== Club career ==
On his return to his homeland, Stotz played three years for FC Wien before joining Austria Wien in 1951. In his 12 years with the Vienna giants he won 4 league titles and 2 domestic cups.

In 2001, he was chosen in Austria's Team of the Century.

== International career ==
He made his debut for Austria in a March 1950 friendly match against Switzerland and was a participant at the 1954 FIFA World Cup and 1958 FIFA World Cup. He earned 42 caps, scoring one goal. His final international was a September 1962 friendly match against Czechoslovakia.

== Retirement ==
He later went into coaching and managed Austria Wien and the Austria national team whom he led to the 1982 FIFA World Cup but was sacked just before the tournament.

Stotz died on 4 April 2017 in Seefeld in Tirol, Austria, aged 90.

== Honours ==
- Austrian Football Bundesliga (4):
  - 1953, 1961, 1962, 1963
- Austrian Cup (2):
  - 1960,1962
