= FK Austria Wien =

Austrian football club

Austria Wien
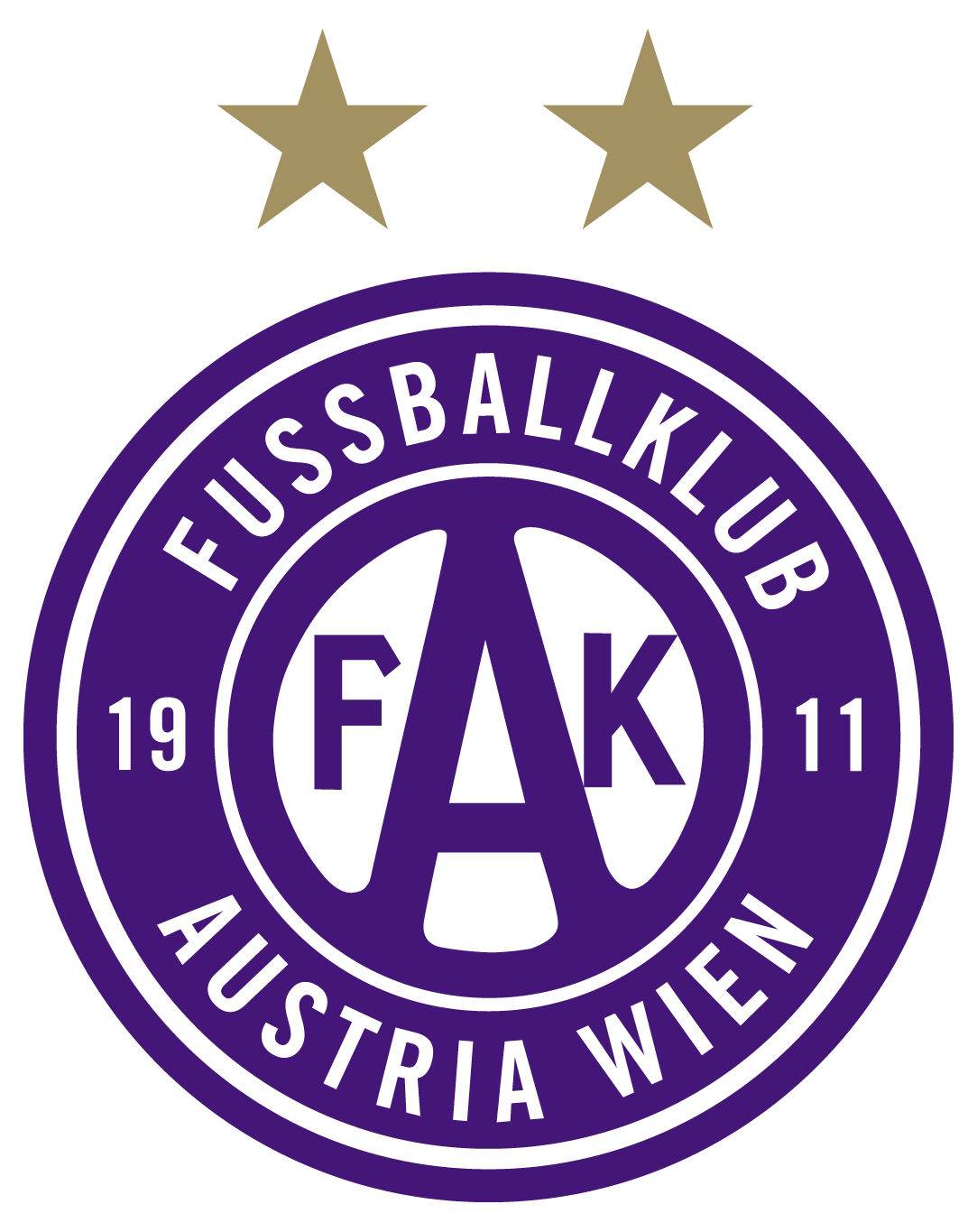
- Full name: Fußballklub Austria Wien AG
- Nickname: Die Veilchen (The Violets)
- Founded: 15 March 1911; 115 years ago
- Ground: Generali Arena
- Capacity: 17,565
- Chairman: Kurt Gollowitzer
- Head coach: Maximilian Uhlig (caretaker)
- League: Austrian Bundesliga
- 2025–26: Austrian Bundesliga, 4th of 12
- Website: www.fk-austria.at
Home colours	Away colours

Fußballklub Austria Wien AG (German pronunciation: [ˈaʊstri̯aː ˈviːn]), known in English as Austria Vienna, and Austria Wien in German-speaking countries, is an Austrian professional association football club from the capital city of Vienna. It has won the most trophies of any Austrian club from the top flight, with 24 Austrian Bundesliga titles and 27 Austrian Cup titles. With 27 victories in the Austrian Cup and six in the Austrian Supercup, Austria Wien is also the most successful club in each of those tournaments. The club reached the UEFA Cup Winners' Cup final in 1978, and the semi-finals of the European Cup the season after. The club plays at the Franz Horr Stadium, known as the Generali Arena since a 2010 naming rights deal with an Italian insurance company. Along with their local rivals, they have never been relegated.

== History ==
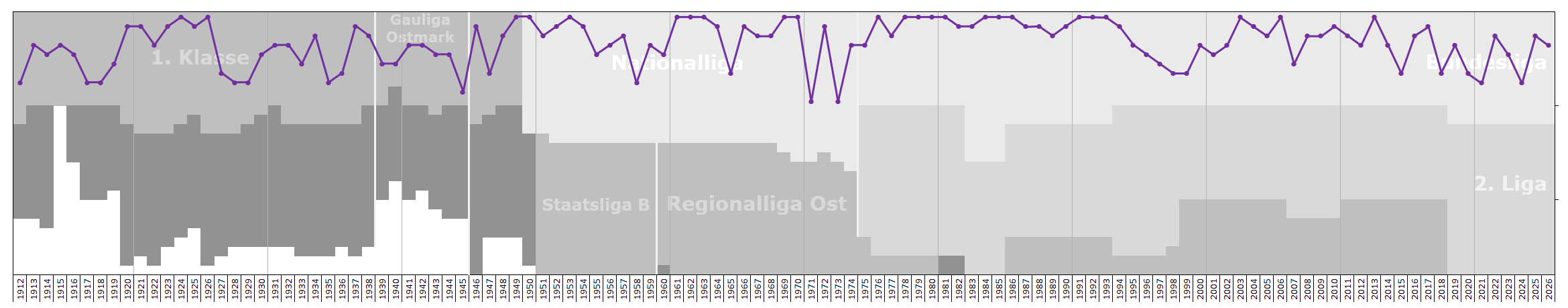
Historical chart of Austria Wien league performance

=== Foundation to World War II ===
FK Austria Wien has its roots in Wiener Cricketer, established on 20 October 1910 in Vienna. The club was renamed Wiener Amateur-SV in December of that year and adopted the name Fußballklub Austria Wien on 28 November 1926.

The team claimed its first championship title in 1924. Wiener Amateur changed its name to Austria Wien in 1926 as the amateurs became professionals. The club won its second league title that year.

The 1930s, one of Austria Wien's most successful eras, brought two titles (1933 and 1936) in the Mitropa Cup, a tournament for champions in Central Europe. The star of that side was forward Matthias Sindelar, who was voted in 1998 as the greatest Austrian footballer.

The club's success was interrupted by the annexation of Austria by Nazi Germany in 1938, with Austria taunted as "Judenklub". While Jewish players and staff at the club were killed or fled the country, Sindelar died under unresolved circumstances on 23 January 1939 of carbon monoxide poisoning in his apartment. He had refused to play for the combined Germany–Austria national team, citing injury (bad knees) and retirement from international matches. The club was part of the top-flight regional Gauliga Ostmark in German competition from 1938 to 1945, but never finished higher than fourth. They participated in the Tschammerpokal (the predecessor to the modern-day DFB-Pokal) in 1938 and 1941. Nazi sports authorities directed that the team change its name to Sportclub Ostmark Wien in an attempt to Germanize it on 12 April 1938, but the club re-adopted its historical identity almost immediately on 14 July 1938.

=== Post-World War II ===
Austria Wien won its first league title for 23 years in 1949, and retained it the following year. It later won a fifth title in 1953. The club won three-straight titles in 1961, 1962 and 1963. Forward Ernst Ocwirk, who played in five league title-winning sides in two separate spells at the club, managed the side to 1969 and 1970 Bundesliga titles. Other players of this era included Horst Nemec.

From the 1973–74 season, Wiener AC formed a joint team with FK Austria Wien, which was called FK Austria WAC Wien until 1976–77, when Austria Wien opted to revert to their own club's traditional name. The results of the joint team are part of the Austria Wien football history. From 1977 onwards, Austria Tabakwerke took over the sponsorship and Austria was competed under the new name Austria-Memphis.

The 1970s saw the beginning of another successful era, despite no league title between 1970 and 1976 as an aging squad was rebuilt. Eight league titles in eleven seasons from 1975–76 to 1985–86 reasserted its dominance. After winning the 1977 Austrian Cup, Austria Wien reached the 1978 European Cup Winners' Cup final, which they lost 4–0 to Belgian club Anderlecht. The following season, the club reached the semi-finals of the European Cup, losing 1–0 on aggregate to Swedish team Malmö FF. In 1982–83, Austria Wien reached the semi-finals of the Cup Winners' Cup, losing 5–3 on aggregate to Real Madrid.

Players at Austria Wien in this era included Herbert "Schneckerl" Prohaska, Felix Gasselich, Thomas Parits, Walter Schachner, Gerhard Steinkogler, Toni Polster, Peter Stöger, Ivica Vastić and Tibor Nyilasi.

=== Recent history ===
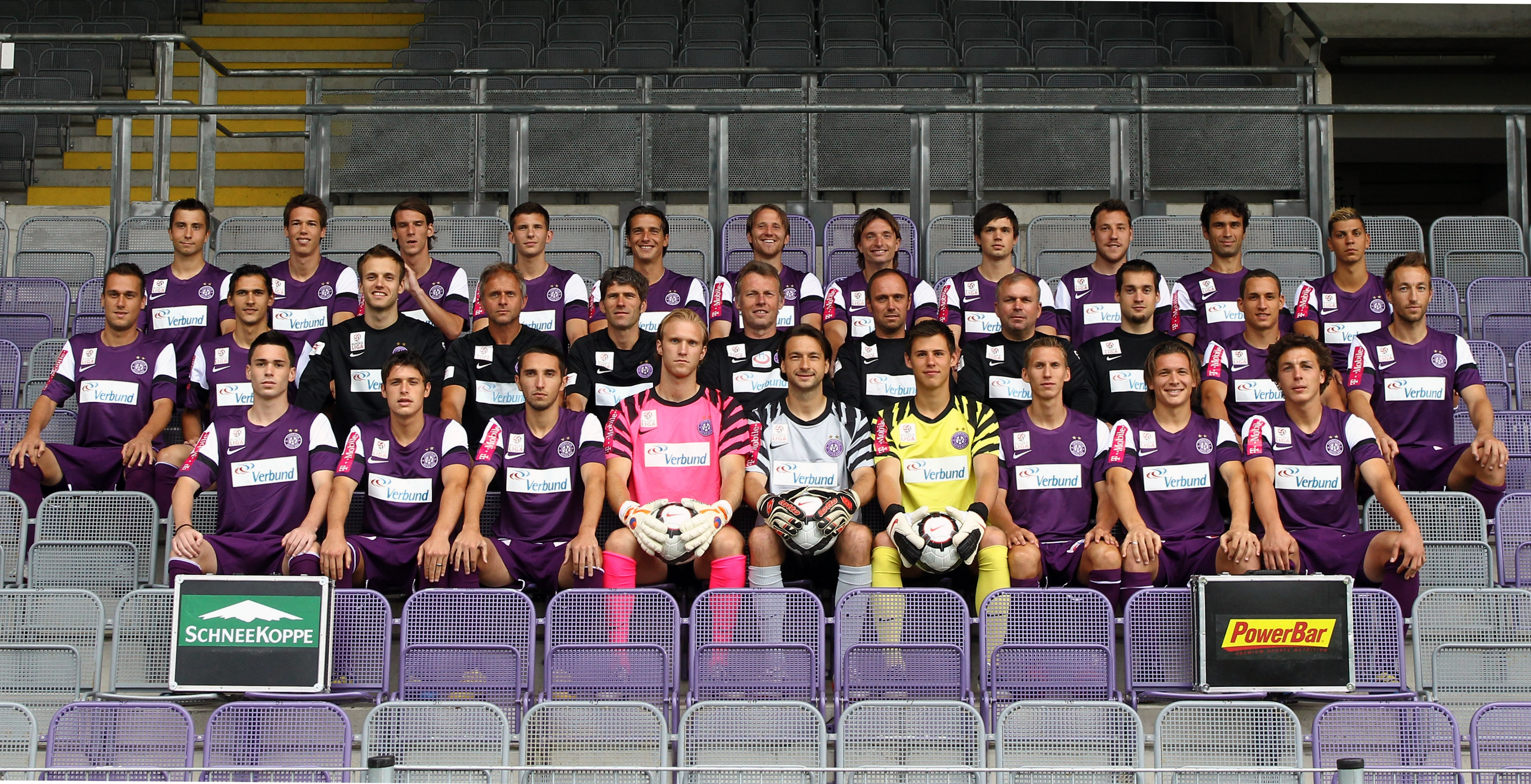
Team photo for the 2010–2011 season

At the start of the 1990s, Austria Wien enjoyed its most recent period of sustained success: three-straight Bundesliga titles from 1991 to 1993; three Austrian Cup titles in 1990, 1992 and 1994; and four Austrian Supercup titles in 1991, 1992, 1993, 1994. However, the club declined in the late 1990s due to financial problems which forced key players to be sold.

Austria Wien was taken over by Austro–Canadian billionaire Frank Stronach's Magna auto-parts consortium in 1999. Following deals with the Memphis cigarette company, the club was renamed FK Austria Memphis Magna. Stronach's investment in players, with a budget three times larger than the average in the league, saw a first Bundesliga title for ten years in 2002–03. Despite this, head coach Walter Schachner was fired. Although his replacement Christoph Daum could not retain the league title, he won the Austrian Cup.

In 2004, Memphis was dropped from the club's name. Austria Wien reached the UEFA Cup quarter-final in 2004–05, where they were eliminated by Parma. On 21 November 2005, Frank Stonach withdrew from the club. Consequently, several players (including top scorer Roland Linz, Vladimír Janočko, Joey Didulica, Libor Sionko, Filip Šebo and Sigurd Rushfeldt) were sold to other teams the following summer. The 2005–06 season nonetheless concluded with a Bundesliga and Cup double.

The loss of key players and a much lower budget for the 2006–07 season saw the club suffer. Despite losing 4–1 on aggregate to Benfica in the preliminary round of the UEFA Champions League, the team managed to qualify (against Legia Warsaw winning 2–1 on aggregate) for the group phase of the UEFA Cup. Former player and coach Thomas Parits became general manager. After the side lost three days later 4–0 away to Red Bull Salzburg, Partis terminated coaches Peter Stöger and Frank Schinkels. Georg Zellhofer replaced them. The season saw a sixth-place finish in the Bundesliga despite being in last place at Christmas. However, the club also won the Cup that year. The side improved the following season, finishing in third in the league.

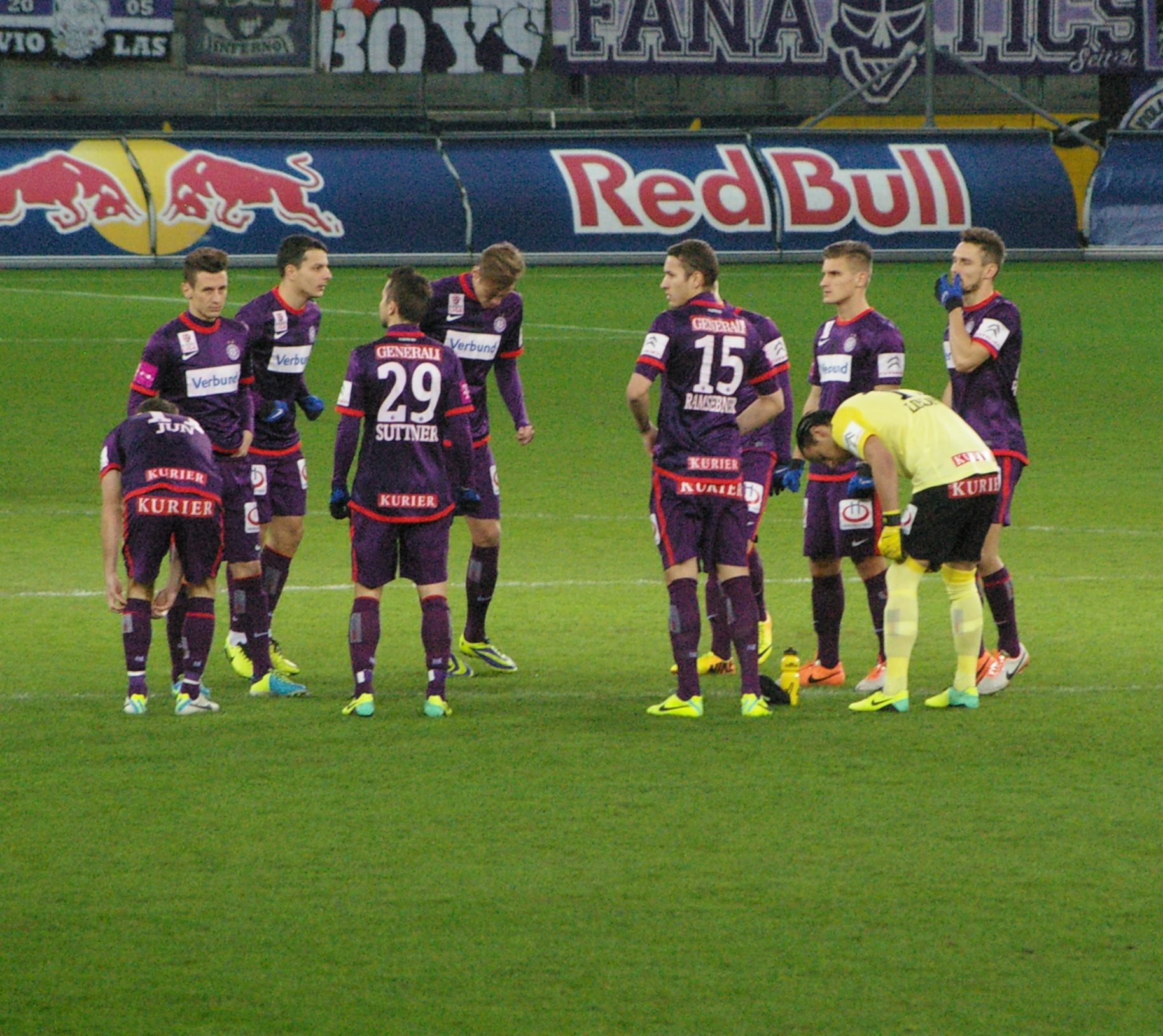
Austria Wien players on the pitch against Red Bull Salzburg, December 2013

The summer of 2008 brought notable changes. Twelve players left the club, including Sanel Kuljić and Yüksel Sariyar, who joined Frank Stronach's newly founded team FC Magna in Austria's second division. The Betriebsführervertrag ("operating contract") with Stronach's Magna company expired, letting the club reorganize. On 1 July 2008, the original name FK Austria Wien was reinstated, without a sponsor's name included for the first time in 30 years. The club also bought Chinese international Sun Xiang, the first Chinese player to play in the Bundesliga. In the 2012–13 season, Austria Wien won its 24th league title, ahead of holders Red Bull Salzburg, but lost the Austrian Cup final 1–0 to third-tier club FC Pasching.

In August 2013, Austria Wien qualified to the UEFA Champions League group stage for the first time after defeating Dinamo Zagreb in the play-offs round. They were drawn against Porto, Atlético Madrid and Zenit Saint Petersburg, all of which have won European trophies in the 21st century. Austria finished last in the group after a loss to Porto at home (0–1), a draw against Zenit in Saint Petersburg (0–0), two losses against Atlético and an away draw against Porto, which eventually put the Portuguese side to the third place in the group. A consolation came when Austria defeated Zenit 4–1 at Ernst-Happel-Stadion.

== Stadium ==
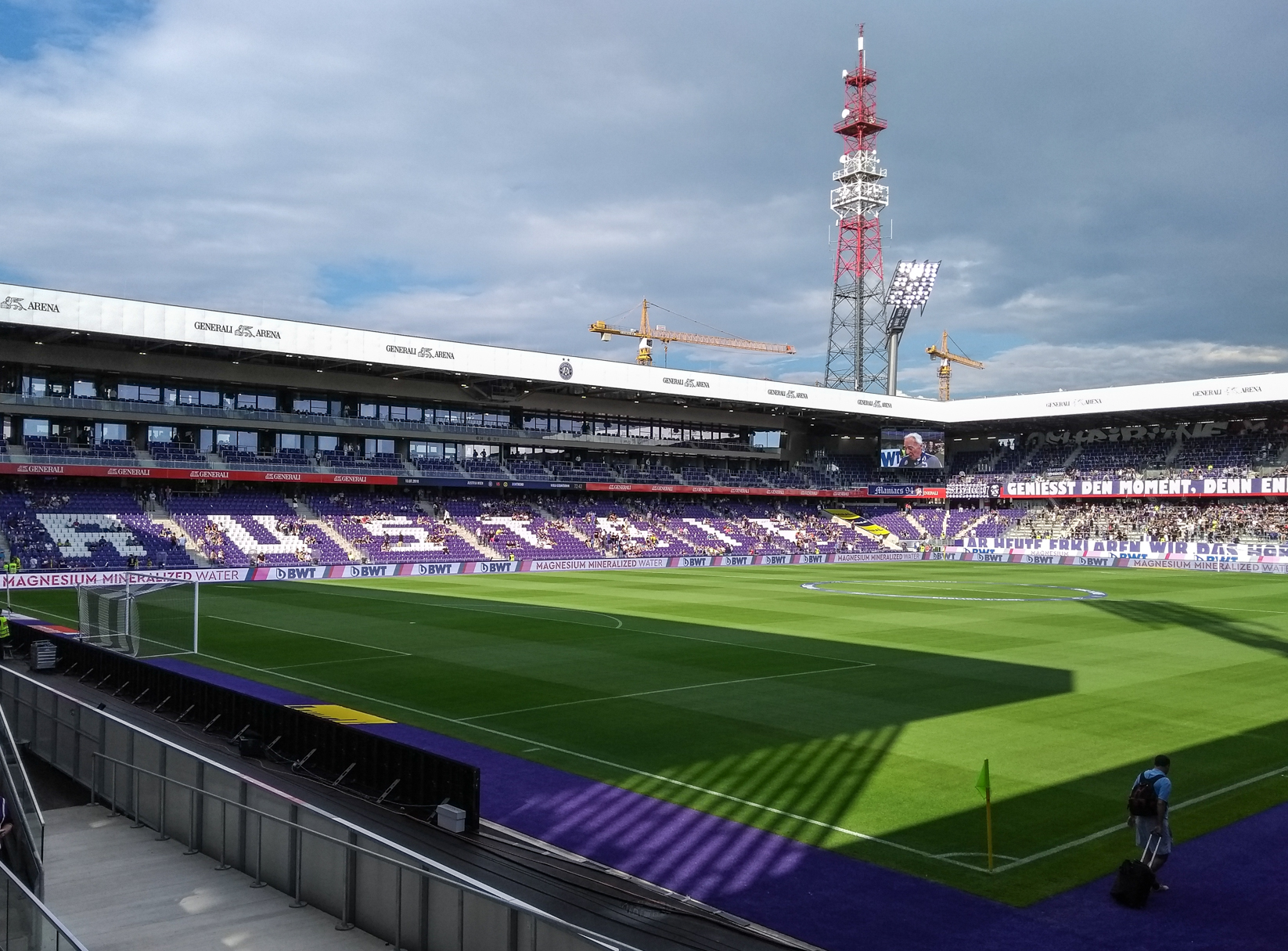
Franz Horr Stadium

Austria Wien plays its home games at the Franz Horr Stadium, which has had a capacity of 17,000 since 2008, when a new two-tiered East Stand opened and renovations were made to the West Stand. The stadium was renamed the Generali Arena in a naming-rights deal with Italian insurer Generali announced at the end of 2010.

The stadium was originally built in 1925 for Slovan Vienna, a Czech immigrants' club, and was largely destroyed by the Allies in World War II. Austria Wien moved into the ground in 1973, playing its first match there on 26 August. The stadium was subsequently named for Franz Horr, chairman of the Viennese FA, following his death. The stadium was expanded with new or renovated stands in 1982, 1986, 1998 and, most recently, 2008.

== Rivalries ==
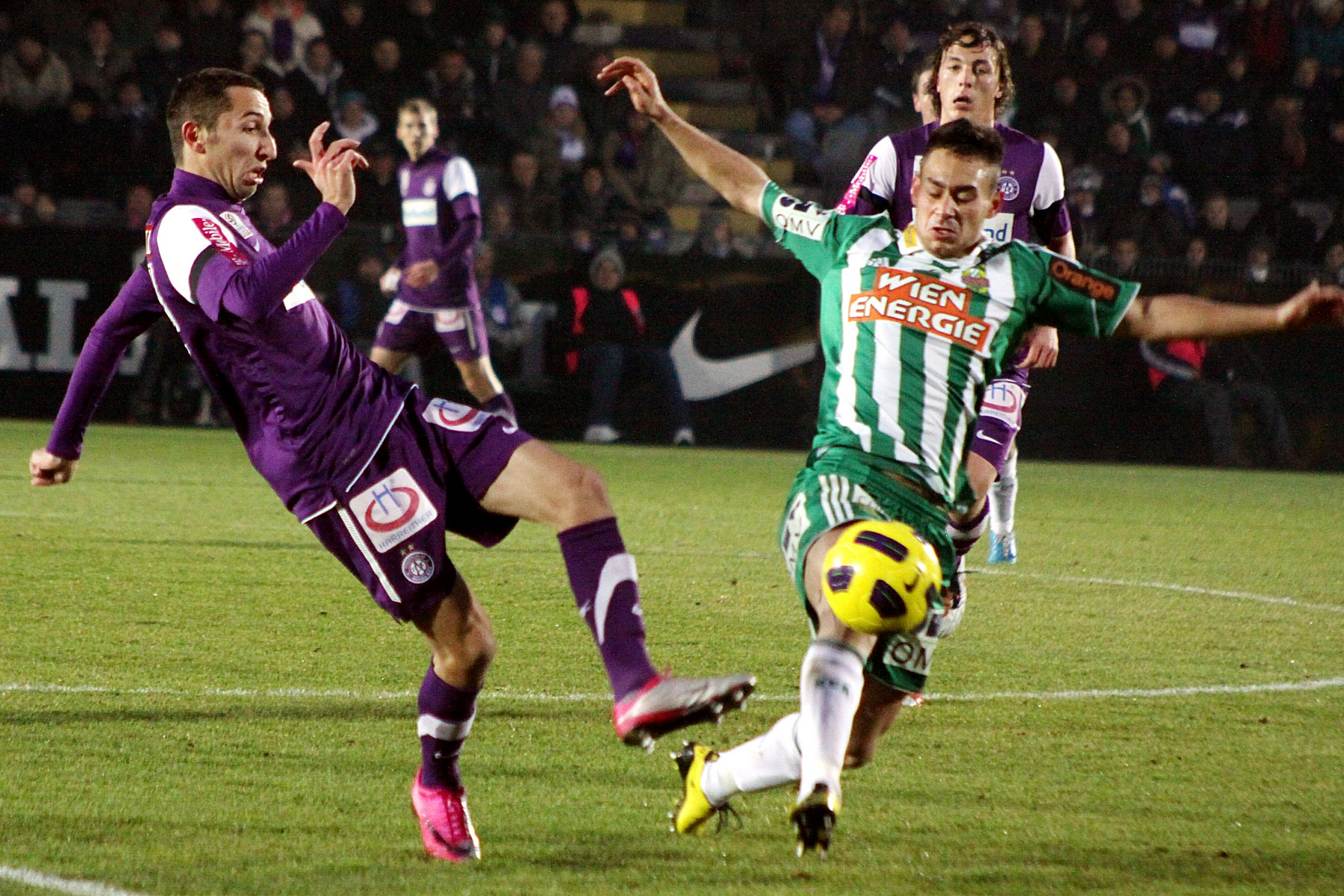
A 2010 Wien derby match between Austria Vienna and Rapid Vienna.

Austria Wien contests the Vienna derby with Rapid Wien. The two clubs are two of the most supported and successful in the country, and are the only Austrian clubs to have never been relegated. They are two of the most culturally and socially significant clubs, both historically representing wider divisions in Viennese society. Both teams originate from Hietzing, the 13th district in the west of the city, but have since moved into different districts. Austria Wien is seen as a middle-class club, and before World War II, as part of the coffeehouse culture associated with the capital's intelligentsia. Rapid traditionally holds the support of the city's working class. The two clubs first met in a league championship match on 8 September 1911, a 4–1 victory for Rapid. The fixture is the most-played derby in European football after the Old Firm match in Glasgow and the Edinburgh derby in Edinburgh, both in Scotland.

== Honours ==
FK Austria Wien honours
Type	Competition	Titles	Seasons
International	Mitropa Cup	2	1933, 1936
Domestic	Austrian Bundesliga	24	1923–24, 1925–26, 1948–49, 1949–50, 1952–53, 1960–61, 1961–62, 1962–63, 1968–69, 1969–70, 1975–76, 1977–78, 1978–79, 1979–80, 1980–81, 1983–84, 1984–85, 1985–86, 1990–91, 1991–92, 1992–93, 2002–03, 2005–06, 2012–13
Domestic	Austrian Cup	27	1920–21, 1923–24, 1924–25, 1925–26, 1932–33, 1934–35, 1935–36, 1947–48, 1948–49, 1959–60, 1961–62, 1962–63, 1966–67, 1970–71, 1973–74, 1976–77, 1979–80, 1981–82, 1985–86, 1989–90, 1991–92, 1993–94, 2002–03, 2004–05, 2005–06, 2006–07, 2008–09
Domestic	Austrian Supercup	6	1990, 1991, 1992, 1993, 2003, 2004

- record

=== Minor & Unofficial Titles ===
- Wiener Cup (2)

Winners: 1948, 1949

=== European competitions ===
- Jeunesse et des Etudiants de Jeux Sportif (1)

Champions: 1959

- European Cup Winners' Cup

Runners-up: 1978

- Wiener Cup (2)

Winners: 1948, 1949

=== Intercontinental competitions ===
- Copa Rio

Semi-finals (2): 1951, 1952

== European record ==
Season	Competition	Round	Country	Club	Home	Away
1960–61	UEFA Cup Winners' Cup	Quarter-finals	(England)	Wolverhampton Wanderers	2–0	0–5
1961–62	European Cup	1R	(Romania)	Steaua București	2–0	0–0
1961–62	European Cup	2R	(Portugal)	Benfica	1–1	1–5
1962–63	European Cup	1R	(Finland)	HIFK	5–3	2–0
1962–63	European Cup	2R	(France)	Stade Reims	3–2	0–5
1963–64	European Cup	1R	(Poland)	Górnik Zabrze	1–0, 1–2	0–1
1967–68	UEFA Cup Winners' Cup	1R	(Romania)	Steaua București	0–2	1–2
1969–70	European Cup	1R	(Soviet Union)	Dynamo Kyiv	1–2	1–3
1970–71	European Cup	Qualification	(Bulgaria)	Levski Sofia	3–0	1–3
1970–71	European Cup	1R	(Spain)	Atlético Madrid	1–2	0–2
1971–72	UEFA Cup Winners' Cup	Qualification	(Denmark)	B 1909	2–0	2–4
1971–72	UEFA Cup Winners' Cup	1R	(Albania)	Dinamo Tirana	1–0	1–1
1971–72	UEFA Cup Winners' Cup	2R	(Italy)	Torino	0–0	0–1
1972–73	UEFA Cup	1R	(Bulgaria)	Beroe Stara Zagora	1–3	0–7
1974–75	UEFA Cup Winners' Cup	1R	(Belgium)	Waregem	4–1	1–2
1974–75	UEFA Cup Winners' Cup	2R	(Spain)	Real Madrid	2–2	0–3
1976–77	European Cup	1R	(Germany)	Borussia Mönchengladbach	1–0	0–3
1977–78	UEFA Cup Winners' Cup	1R	(Wales)	Cardiff City	1–0	0–0
1977–78	UEFA Cup Winners' Cup	2R	(Czechoslovak Socialist Republic)	MFK Košice	0–0	1–1
1977–78	UEFA Cup Winners' Cup	Quarter-finals	(Socialist Federal Republic of Yugoslavia)	Hajduk Split	1–1	1–1 (p 3-0)
1977–78	UEFA Cup Winners' Cup	Semi-finals	(Soviet Union)	Dynamo Moscow	2–1 (p 5-4)	1–2
1977–78	UEFA Cup Winners' Cup	Final	(Belgium)	Anderlecht	0–4	
1978–79	European Cup	1R	(Albania)	Vllaznia	4–1	0–2
1978–79	European Cup	2R	(Norway)	Lillestrøm	4–1	0–0
1978–79	European Cup	Quarter-finals	(East Germany)	Dynamo Dresden	3–1	0–1
1978–79	European Cup	Semi-finals	(Sweden)	Malmö FF	0–0	0–1
1979–80	European Cup	1R	(Denmark)	Vejle	1–1	2–3
1980–81	European Cup	1R	(Scotland)	Aberdeen	0–0	0–1
1981–82	European Cup	1R	(Albania)	Partizani	3–1	0–1
1981–82	European Cup	2R	(Soviet Union)	Dynamo Kyiv	0–1	1–1
1982–83	UEFA Cup Winners' Cup	1R	(Greece)	Panathinaikos	2–0	1–2
1982–83	UEFA Cup Winners' Cup	2R	(Turkey)	Galatasaray	0–1	4–2
1982–83	UEFA Cup Winners' Cup	Quarter-finals	(Spain)	Barcelona	0–0	1–1
1982–83	UEFA Cup Winners' Cup	Semi-finals	(Spain)	Real Madrid	2–2	1–3
1983–84	UEFA Cup	1R	(Luxembourg)	Aris Bonnevoie	10–0	5–0
1983–84	UEFA Cup	2R	(France)	Stade Lavallois	2–0	3–3
1983–84	UEFA Cup	3R	(Italy)	Internazionale	2–1	1–1
1983–84	UEFA Cup	Quarter-finals	(England)	Tottenham Hotspur	2–2	0–2
1984–85	European Cup	1R	(Malta)	Valletta	4–0	4–0
1984–85	European Cup	2R	(East Germany)	Dynamo Berlin	2–1	3–3
1984–85	European Cup	Quarter-finals	(England)	Liverpool	1–1	1–4
1985–86	European Cup	1R	(East Germany)	Dynamo Berlin	2–1	2–0
1985–86	European Cup	2R	(Germany)	Bayern Munich	3–3	2–4
1986–87	European Cup	1R	(Luxembourg)	Avenir Beggen	3–0	3–0
1986–87	European Cup	2R	(Germany)	Bayern Munich	1–1	0–2
1987–88	UEFA Cup	1R	(Germany)	Bayer Leverkusen	0–0	1–5
1988–89	UEFA Cup	1R	(Soviet Union)	Žalgiris	5–2	0–2
1988–89	UEFA Cup	2R	(Scotland)	Hearts	0–1	0–0
1989–90	UEFA Cup	1R	(Netherlands)	Ajax	1–0	3–0
1989–90	UEFA Cup	2R	(Germany)	Werder Bremen	2–0	0–5
1990–91	UEFA Cup Winners' Cup	1R	(Germany)	Eintracht Schwerin	0–0	2–0
1990–91	UEFA Cup Winners' Cup	2R	(Italy)	Juventus	0–4	0–4
1991–92	European Cup	1R	(England)	Arsenal	1–0	1–6
1992–93	UEFA Champions League	1R	(Bulgaria)	CSKA Sofia	3–1	2–3
1992–93	UEFA Champions League	2R	(Belgium)	Club Brugge	3–1	0–2
1993–94	UEFA Champions League	1R	(Norway)	Rosenborg	4–1	1–3
1993–94	UEFA Champions League	2R	(Spain)	Barcelona	1–2	0–3
1994–95	UEFA Cup Winners' Cup	1R	(Slovenia)	Maribor	3–0	1–1
1994–95	UEFA Cup Winners' Cup	2R	(England)	Chelsea	1–1	0–0
1995–96	UEFA Cup	Qualification	(Azerbaijan)	Kapaz Ganja	5–1	4–0
1995–96	UEFA Cup	1R	(Belarus)	Dinamo Minsk	1–2	0–1
1996	UEFA Intertoto Cup	Group 3, 1st game	(Slovenia)	Maribor		0–3
1996	UEFA Intertoto Cup	Group 3, 2nd game	(Iceland)	Keflavík	6–0	
1996	UEFA Intertoto Cup	Group 3, 3rd game	(Denmark)	Copenhagen		1–2
1996	UEFA Intertoto Cup	Group 3, 4th game	(Sweden)	Örebro	2–3	
1997	UEFA Intertoto Cup	Group 9, 1st game	(Slovakia)	MŠK Žilina		1–3
1997	UEFA Intertoto Cup	Group 9, 2nd game	(Romania)	Rapid București	1–1	
1997	UEFA Intertoto Cup	Group 9, 3rd game	(France)	Lyon		0–2
1997	UEFA Intertoto Cup	Group 9, 4th game	(Poland)	Odra Wodzisław	1–5	
1998	UEFA Intertoto Cup	1R	(Poland)	Ruch Chorzów	0–1	2–2
1999	UEFA Intertoto Cup	3R	(Belgium)	Sint-Truiden	1–2	2–0
1999	UEFA Intertoto Cup	4R	(France)	Rennes	2–2	0–2
2000	UEFA Intertoto Cup	2R	(Cyprus)	Nea Salamina Famagusta	3–0	0–1
2000	UEFA Intertoto Cup	3R	(Romania)	Ceahlăul Piatra Neamț	3–0	2–2
2000	UEFA Intertoto Cup	4R	(Italy)	Udinese	0–1	0–2
2002–03	UEFA Cup	1R	(Ukraine)	Shakhtar Donetsk	5–1	0–1
2002–03	UEFA Cup	2R	(Portugal)	Porto	0–1	0–2
2003–04	UEFA Champions League	3QR	(France)	Marseille	0–1	0–0
2003–04	UEFA Cup	1R	(Germany)	Borussia Dortmund	1–2	0–1
2004–05	UEFA Cup	2QR	(Ukraine)	Illichivets Mariupol	3–0	0–0
2004–05	UEFA Cup	1R	(Poland)	Legia Warsaw	1–0	3–1
2004–05	UEFA Cup	Group C	(Spain)	Real Zaragoza	1–0	
2004–05	UEFA Cup	Group C	(Ukraine)	Dnipro Dnipropetrovsk		0–1
2004–05	UEFA Cup	Group C	(Belgium)	Club Brugge	1–1	
2004–05	UEFA Cup	Group C	(Netherlands)	Utrecht		2–1
2004–05	UEFA Cup	3R	(Spain)	Athletic Bilbao	0–0	2–1
2004–05	UEFA Cup	4R	(Spain)	Real Zaragoza	1–1	2–2
2004–05	UEFA Cup	Quarter-finals	(Italy)	Parma	1–1	0–0
2005–06	UEFA Cup	2QR	(Slovakia)	MŠK Žilina	2–2	2–1
2005–06	UEFA Cup	1R	(Norway)	Viking	2–1	0–1
2006–07	UEFA Champions League	3QR	(Portugal)	Benfica	1–1	0–3
2006–07	UEFA Cup	1R	(Poland)	Legia Warsaw	1–0	1–1
2006–07	UEFA Cup	Group F	(Belgium)	Zulte-Waregem	1–4	
2006–07	UEFA Cup	Group F	(Netherlands)	Ajax		0–3
2006–07	UEFA Cup	Group F	(Czech Republic)	Sparta Prague	0–1	
2006–07	UEFA Cup	Group F	(Spain)	Espanyol		0–1
2007–08	UEFA Cup	2QR	(Czech Republic)	Jablonec	4–3	1–1
2007–08	UEFA Cup	1R	(Norway)	Vålerenga	2–0	2–2
2007–08	UEFA Cup	Group H	(France)	Bordeaux	1–2	
2007–08	UEFA Cup	Group H	(Sweden)	Helsingborgs IF		0–3
2007–08	UEFA Cup	Group H	(Greece)	Panionios	0–1	
2007–08	UEFA Cup	Group H	(Turkey)	Galatasaray		0–0
2008–09	UEFA Cup	1QR	(Kazakhstan)	Tobol	2–0	0–1
2008–09	UEFA Cup	2QR	(Georgia (country))	WIT Georgia	2–0	not played
2008–09	UEFA Cup	1R	(Poland)	Lech Poznań	2–1	2–4 (AET)
2009–10	UEFA Europa League	3QR	(Serbia)	Vojvodina	1–1	4–2
2009–10	UEFA Europa League	Play-off	(Ukraine)	Metalurh Donetsk	2–2	3–2 (AET)
2009–10	UEFA Europa League	Group L	(Spain)	Athletic Bilbao	0–3	0–3
2009–10	UEFA Europa League	Group L	(Portugal)	Nacional	1–1	1–5
2009–10	UEFA Europa League	Group L	(Germany)	Werder Bremen	2–2	0–2
2010–11	UEFA Europa League	2QR	(Bosnia and Herzegovina)	Široki Brijeg	2–2	1–0
2010–11	UEFA Europa League	3QR	(Poland)	Ruch Chorzów	3–1	3–0
2010–11	UEFA Europa League	Play-off	(Greece)	Aris	1–1	0–1
2011–12	UEFA Europa League	2QR	(Montenegro)	Rudar Pljevlja	2–0	3–0
2011–12	UEFA Europa League	3QR	(Slovenia)	Olimpija Ljubljana	3–2	1–1
2011–12	UEFA Europa League	Play-off	(Romania)	Gaz Metan Mediaș	3–1	0–1
2011–12	UEFA Europa League	Group G	(Ukraine)	Metalist Kharkiv	1–2	1–4
2011–12	UEFA Europa League	Group G	(Netherlands)	AZ	2–2	2–2
2011–12	UEFA Europa League	Group G	(Sweden)	Malmö FF	2–0	2–1
2013–14	UEFA Champions League	3QR	(Iceland)	FH	1–0	0–0
2013–14	UEFA Champions League	Play-off	(Croatia)	Dinamo Zagreb	2–3	2–0
2013–14	UEFA Champions League	Group G	(Portugal)	Porto	0–1	1–1
2013–14	UEFA Champions League	Group G	(Spain)	Atlético Madrid	0–3	0–4
2013–14	UEFA Champions League	Group G	(Russia)	Zenit Saint Petersburg	4–1	0–0
2016–17	UEFA Europa League	2QR	(Albania)	Kukësi	1–0	4–1
2016–17	UEFA Europa League	3QR	(Slovakia)	Spartak Trnava	0–1	1–0 (5–4p)
2016–17	UEFA Europa League	Play-off	(Norway)	Rosenborg	2–1	2–1
2016–17	UEFA Europa League	Group E	(Romania)	Astra Giurgiu	1–2	3–2
2016–17	UEFA Europa League	Group E	(Czech Republic)	Viktoria Plzeň	0–0	2–3
2016–17	UEFA Europa League	Group E	(Italy)	Roma	2–4	3–3
2017–18	UEFA Europa League	3QR	(Cyprus)	AEL Limassol	0–0	2–1
2017–18	UEFA Europa League	Play-off	(Croatia)	Osijek	0–1	2–1
2017–18	UEFA Europa League	Group D	(Italy)	Milan	1–5	1–5
2017–18	UEFA Europa League	Group D	(Greece)	AEK Athens	0–0	2–2
2017–18	UEFA Europa League	Group D	(Croatia)	Rijeka	1–3	4–1
2019–20	UEFA Europa League	3QR	(Cyprus)	Apollon Limassol	1–2	1–3
2021–22	UEFA Europa Conference League	2QR	(Iceland)	Breiðablik	1–1	1–2
2022–23	UEFA Europa League	Play-off	(Turkey)	Fenerbahçe	0–2	1–4
2022–23	UEFA Europa Conference League	Group C	(Spain)	Villarreal	0–1	0–5
2022–23	UEFA Europa Conference League	Group C	(Israel)	Hapoel Be'er Sheva	0–0	0–4
2022–23	UEFA Europa Conference League	Group C	(Poland)	Lech Poznań	1–1	1–4
2023–24	UEFA Europa Conference League	2QR	(Bosnia and Herzegovina)	Borac Banja Luka	1–0	2–1
2023–24	UEFA Europa Conference League	3QR	(Poland)	Legia Warsaw	3–5	2–1
2024–25	UEFA Conference League	2QR	(Finland)	Ilves	4−3	1−2 (4–5p)
2025–26	UEFA Conference League	2QR	(Georgia (country))	Spaeri	2−0	5−0
2025–26	UEFA Conference League	3QR	(Czech Republic)	Baník Ostrava	1–1	3−4

== Current squad ==
As of 8 September 2026

Note: Flags indicate national team as defined under FIFA eligibility rules; some limited exceptions apply. Players may hold more than one non-FIFA nationality.

No.	Pos.	Nation	Player
1	GK	AUT	Samuel Şahin-Radlinger
3	DF	NGR	Ibrahim Buhari
4	DF	GER	Jonas Feddersen
5	MF	AUT	Valentino Müller
6	MF	AUT	Philipp Maybach
7	MF	AUT	Vasilije Markovic
9	FW	AUS	Noah Botic
10	MF	AUT	Sanel Šaljić
11	FW	AUT	Manprit Sarkaria
13	GK	AUT	Lukas Wedl
14	FW	UGA	Kelvin Boateng
15	DF	AUT	Aleksandar Dragović
16	MF	KOR	Lee Kang-hee
17	DF	KOR	Lee Tae-seok

No.	Pos.	Nation	Player
19	FW	GER	Johannes Eggestein
20	FW	GER	Julian Hettwer
21	DF	AUT	Matteo Schablas
22	MF	AUT	Florian Wustinger
26	MF	AUT	Reinhold Ranftl
28	DF	AUT	Philipp Wiesinger
30	MF	AUT	Manfred Fischer
34	MF	AUT	Romeo Mörth
40	DF	GER	Daniel Nnodim
44	DF	AUT	Valentin Toifl
46	DF	AUT	Johannes Handl
47	FW	CIV	Abdoulaye Kanté
74	FW	AUT	Hasan Deshishku
99	GK	AUT	Mirko Kos

=== Out on loan ===
Note: Flags indicate national team as defined under FIFA eligibility rules; some limited exceptions apply. Players may hold more than one non-FIFA nationality.

No. / Pos. / Nation / Player; — / DF / AUT / Luca Pazourek (at Hartberg until 30 June 2027)	No. / Pos. / Nation / Player

=== Austria Wien II/Young Violets ===
As of 3 February 2026

Note: Flags indicate national team as defined under FIFA eligibility rules; some limited exceptions apply. Players may hold more than one non-FIFA nationality.

No.	Pos.	Nation	Player
1	GK	AUT	Kenan Jusić
2	DF	AUT	Wilhelm Vorsager
3	DF	AUT	Valentin Toifl
4	DF	SRB	Aleksa Ilić
5	DF	AUT	Ifeanyi Ndukwe
7	MF	AUT	Matteo Schablas
8	MF	SOM	Osman Abdi
9	FW	AUT	Hasan Deshishku
11	MF	AUT	Vasilije Marković
12	MF	POL	Mikołaj Sawicki
13	GK	AUT	Stefan Blažević
15	MF	AUT	Fabian Janković
16	FW	AUT	Philipp Hosiner
17	MF	AUT	Julian Roider
18	MF	AUT	Dominik Nišandžić
19	MF	AUT	Filip Lukić

No.	Pos.	Nation	Player
20	FW	AUT	Romeo Mörth
21	DF	AUT	Felix Fischer
22	MF	AUT	Julian Höller
24	DF	AUT	Nicola Wojnar
25	MF	AUT	Thomas Salamon
26	DF	AUT	Nicolas Zdichynec
27	DF	GER	Daniel Nnodim
28	FW	AUT	Marcel Stöger
30	MF	SEN	Clauvis Etienne Carvalho
32	GK	AUT	Paul Mayr
42	DF	AUT	Lars Stöckl
70	MF	NGR	David Ewemade
77	FW	AUT	Marijan Österreicher
90	FW	AUT	Marco Brandt
-	FW	AUT	Lukas Haubenwaller

==== Out on loan ====
Note: Flags indicate national team as defined under FIFA eligibility rules; some limited exceptions apply. Players may hold more than one non-FIFA nationality.

No. / Pos. / Nation / Player	No. / Pos. / Nation / Player

== Club officials ==
Position	Staff
President	(Austria) Kurt Gollowitzer
Board Member	(Austria) Sebastian Prödl
Sporting Director	(Austria) Manuel Ortlechner
Manager	(Austria) Stephan Helm
Assistant Manager	(Turkey) Ahmet Koc
Goalkeeper Coach	(Austria) Udo Siebenhandl
Fitness Coach	(Austria) Christoph Glatzer
Athletic Coach	(Iran) Paiam Yazdanpanah
Head of Scouting/Video Analyst	(Austria) Lorenz Kutscha-Lissberg
Chief Scout	(Austria) Gerhard Hitzel
Scout	(Austria) Siegfried Aigner (Austria) Andreas Ogris (Austria) Maximilian Koppensteiner
Director of youth department	(Austria) René Glatzer
Sports Scientist	(Austria) Christian Puchinger
Team Doctor	(Austria) Dr. Gabriel Halat (Austria) Dr. Roman Ostermann (Germany) Dr. Marcus Hofbauer (Turkey) Dr. Gudrun Sadik
Physiotherapist	(Spain) Roberto Baumgartner (Austria) Richard Horinka
Sportstherapist	(Austria) Christian Hold (Germany) Markus Stoyer
Team Manager	(Austria) Christoph Lehenbauer

== Coaching history ==
As of 1 December 2018

- (England) Jimmy Hogan (1911–12)
- (Austria) Hugo Meisl (1912–13)
- Unknown (1914–18)
- (Austria) Johann Andres (1919–21)
- (Austria) Gustav Lanzer (1922–27)
- (Austria) Robert Lang (1928–30)
- (Austria) Karl Kurz (1930–31)
- (Austria) Rudolf Seidl (1931–32)
- (Austria) Karl Schrott (1933)
- (Austria) Josef Blum (1933–35)
- (Hungary) Jenő Konrád (1935–36)
- (Austria) Walter Nausch (1936–37)
- (Austria) Matthias Sindelar (1937–38)
- (Austria) Josef Schneider (1939–40)
- (Austria) Karl Schneider (1941–42)
- Unknown (1943–45)
- (Austria) Karl Geyer (1945)
- (Austria) Heinrich Müller (1946–54)
- (Austria) Walter Nausch (1954–55)
- (Austria) Leopold Vogl (1956–57)
- (Austria) Karl Adamek (1957–58)
- (Austria) Josef Smistik (1958–59)
- (Austria) Walter Probst (1959–60)
- (Austria) Karl Schlechta (1960–62)
- (Austria) Eduard Frühwirth (1962–64)
- (Austria) Ernst Ocwirk (1 July 1965 – 30 June 1971)
- (Austria) Heinrich "Wudi" Müller (1 July 1971 – 30 June 1972)
- (Austria) Karl Stotz (1 June 1972 – 15 March 1973)
- (Hungary) Béla Guttmann (16 March 1973 – 31 May 1973)
- (Austria) Josef Pecanka (1973–74)
- (Austria) Josef Argauer (1974)
- (Austria) Robert Dienst (1974–75)
- (Austria) Johann Löser (1 Jan 1975 – 30 June 1975)
- (Austria) Karl Stotz (1 July 1975 – 30 June 1977)
- (Austria) Hermann Stessl (1 July 1977 – 31 May 1979)
- (Austria) Erich Hof (1 July 1979 – 31 March 1982)
- (Czechoslovakia) Václav Halama (1 April 1982 – 30 June 1984)
- (Austria) Thomas Parits (1 July 1984 – 30 June 1985)
- (Austria) Hermann Stessl (1 July 1985 – 30 June 1986)
- (Austria) Thomas Parits (1 July 1986 – 30 June 1987)
- (Austria) Karl Stotz (1 July 1987 – 11 Oct 1987)
- (Austria) Ferdinand Janotka (12 Oct 1987 – 30 June 1988)
- (Austria) August Starek (1 July 1988 – 17 Nov 1988)
- (Austria) Robert Sara (17 Nov 1988 – 31 Dec 1988)
- (Austria) Erich Hof (1 Jan 1989 – 28 March 1990)
- (Austria) Herbert Prohaska (28 March 1990 – 9 June 1992)
- (Austria) Hermann Stessl (1 July 1992 – 31 May 1993)
- (Austria) Josef Hickersberger (1 July 1993 – 30 June 1994)
- (Germany) Egon Coordes (1 July 1994 – 30 June 1995)
- (Germany) Horst Hrubesch (1 July 1995 – 30 June 1996)
- (Austria) Walter Skocik (1 July 1996 – 15 April 1997)
- (Germany) Wolfgang Frank (26 April 1997 – 8 April 1998)
- (Austria) Robert Sara (interim) (9 April 1998 – 17 May 1998)
- (Slovenia) Zdenko Verdenik (17 May 1998 – 2 April 1999)
- (Austria) Friedrich Koncilia (interim) (2 April 1999 – 30 May 1999)
- (Austria) Herbert Prohaska (1 June 1999 – 3 May 2000)
- (Austria) Ernst Baumeister (interim) (3 May 2000 – 31 May 2000)
- (Austria) Heinz Hochhauser (1 June 2000 – 12 March 2001)
- (Netherlands) Arie Haan (12 March 2001 – 13 Aug 2001)
- (Austria) Anton Pfeffer (12 Aug 2001 – 21 Dec 2001)
- (Austria) Walter Hörmann (14 Aug 2001 – 31 Dec 2001)
- (Austria) Dietmar Constantini (interim) (1 Jan 2002 – 31 May 2002)
- (Austria) Walter Schachner (1 July 2002 – 4 Oct 2002)
- (Germany) Christoph Daum (4 Oct 2002 – 30 June 2003)
- (Germany) Joachim Löw (1 July 2003 – 24 March 2004)
- (Denmark) Lars Søndergaard (March 2004 – May 2005)
- (Austria) Peter Stöger (6 May 2005 – 31 Dec 2005)
- (Austria) Frank Schinkels (1 Jan 2006 – 23 Oct 2006)
- (Austria) Georg Zellhofer (23 Oct 2006 – 19 March 2008)
- (Austria) Dietmar Constantini (interim) (19 March 2008 – 26 April 2008)
- (Austria) Karl Daxbacher (21 May 2008 – 21 Dec 2011)
- (Austria) Ivica Vastić (21 Dec 2011 – 21 May 2012)
- (Austria) Peter Stöger (11 June 2012 – 18 June 2013)
- (Croatia) Nenad Bjelica (17 June 2013 – 16 Feb 2014)
- (Austria) Herbert Gager (interim) (16 Feb 2014 – 16 May 2014)
- (Austria) Gerald Baumgartner (1 June 2014 – 22 March 2015)
- (Austria) Andreas Ogris (22 March 2015 – 30 June 2015)
- (Germany) Thorsten Fink (1 July 2015 – 27 February 2018)
- (Germany) Thomas Letsch (27 February 2018 – 11 March 2019)
- (Austria) Robert Ibertsberger (11 March 2019 – 30 June 2019)
- (Austria) Peter Stöger (31 July 2020 – 5 June 2021)
- (Austria) Manfred Schmid (1 July 2021 – 5 December 2022)
- (Germany) Michael Wimmer (3 January 2023 – 13 May 2024)
- (Austria) Christian Wegleitner (interim) (13 May 2024 – 10 June 2024)
- (Austria) Stephan Helm (10 June 2024 – present)

== See also ==
- The Football Club Social Alliance
