= Samuel Şahin-Radlinger =

Austrian footballer (born 1992)

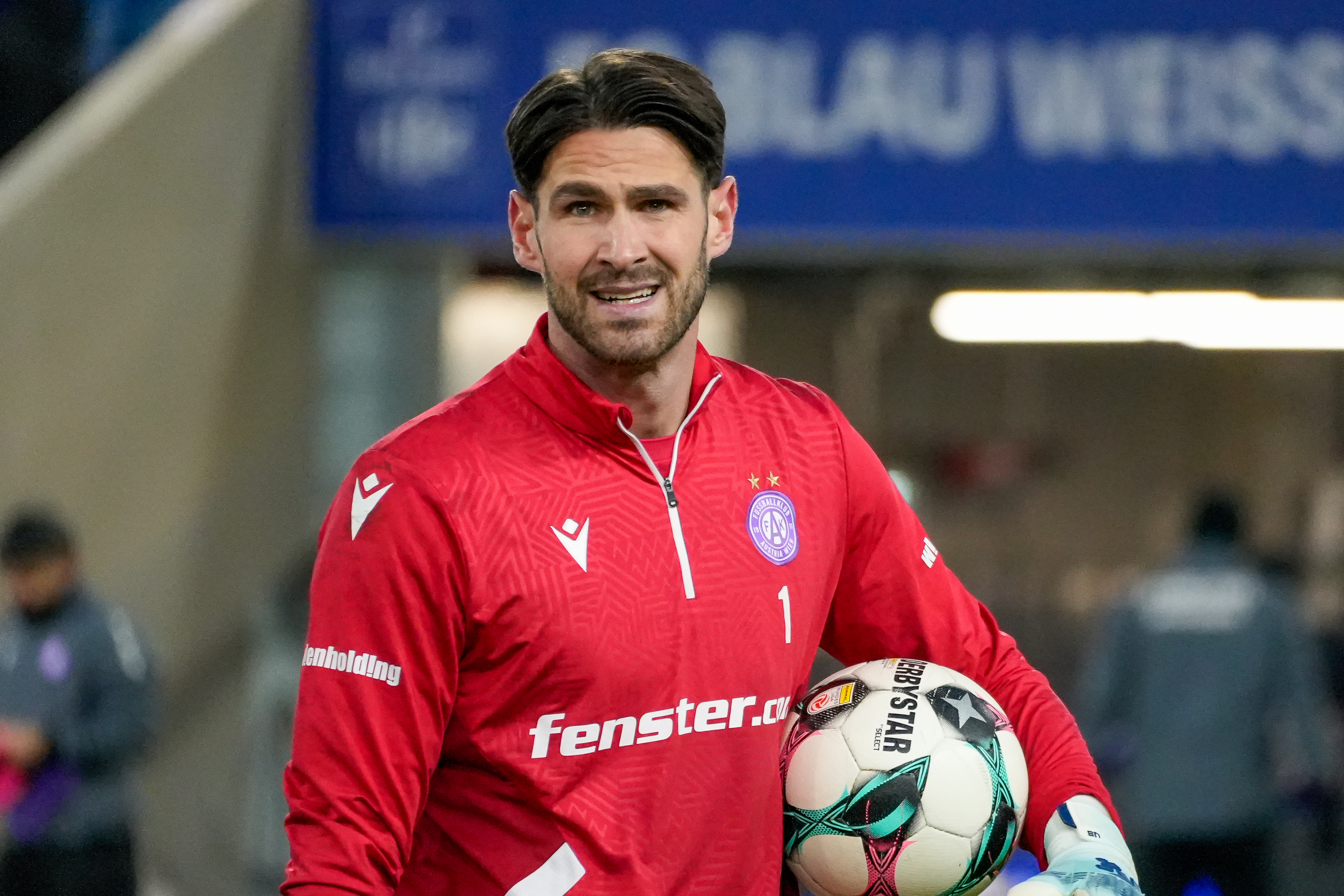
- Radlinger in 2025

Personal information
- Date of birth: 7 November 1992 (age 34)
- Place of birth: Ried, Austria
- Height: 1.98 m (6 ft 6 in)
- Position: Goalkeeper

Team information
- Current team: Austria Wien
- Number: 1

Youth career
- –2009: SV Ried

Senior career*
Years	Team	Apps	(Gls)
2009–2011	SV Ried	0	(0)
2010–2011	→ Union St. Florian (loan)	25	(0)
2011–2019	Hannover 96 II	80	(0)
2011–2019	Hannover 96	3	(0)
2013–2014	→ Rapid Wien (loan)	1	(0)
2013–2014	→ Rapid Wien II (loan)	5	(0)
2014–2015	→ 1. FC Nürnberg II (loan)	14	(0)
2014–2015	→ 1. FC Nürnberg (loan)	0	(0)
2018	→ Brann (loan)	22	(0)
2019–2020	Barnsley	18	(0)
2020–2023	SV Ried	84	(0)
2023–	Austria Wien	64	(0)
2023–2024	→ Almere City (loan)	6	(0)

International career
2010	Austria U18	1	(0)
2010	Austria U19	1	(0)
2011	Austria U20	3	(0)
2011–2014	Austria U21	12	(0)
- * Club domestic league appearances and goals as of 18 May 2026

Samuel Şahin-Radlinger (born Radlinger; 7 November 1992) is an Austrian professional footballer who plays as a goalkeeper for Austria Wien.

== Club career ==
Şahin-Radlinger was developed by the youth system of SV Ried, and his first experience of first-team football came during a loan spell at Union St. Florian of the Austrian Regional League Central during the 2010–11 season.

Shortly afterwards, in June 2011, Şahin-Radlinger was signed by German club Hannover 96. He spent the next two years as first-choice goalkeeper for Hannover's reserve team in the Regionalliga Nord before joining Rapid Wien on a two-year loan deal in the summer of 2013. He made his Bundesliga debut in a 0–0 draw with Wiener Neustadt on 15 December 2013.

On 30 January 2018, Şahin-Radlinger joined Norwegian top-tier team SK Brann on loan for rest of the 2018 season. Brann were given an option to sign him permanently at the end of the loan; however, the club decided against pulling the option and Şahin-Radlinger returned to Hannover 96 at the end of the season.

On 26 June 2019, English side Barnsley confirmed that Samuel had signed a permanent contract with Daniel Stendel's side.

On 13 August 2020, he returned to his first club SV Ried.

On 1 September 2023, Şahin-Radlinger signed a three-year contract with Austria Wien and was immediately loaned out to Almere City in the Netherlands.

== International career ==
Şahin-Radlinger has represented Austria at every level from under-18 to under-21 and was the first-choice goalkeeper of the Austrian squad at the 2011 FIFA Under-20 World Cup.

== Personal life ==
In June 2016, he married actress Sıla Şahin, taking on the joint name "Şahin-Radlinger".

== Career statistics ==
As of match played 27 August 2026

Appearances and goals by club, season and competition
Club	Season	League			Cup		League Cup		Europe		Other		Total	
Club	Season	Division	Apps	Goals	Apps	Goals	Apps	Goals	Apps	Goals	Apps	Goals	Apps	Goals
SV Ried	2010–11	Austrian Bundesliga	0	0	0	0	—		—		0	0	0	0
Union St. Florian (loan)	2010–11	Austrian Regionalliga	25	0	0	0	—		—		0	0	25	0
Hannover 96 II	2011–12	Regionalliga Nord	16	0	—		—		—		—		16	0
Hannover 96 II	2012–13	Regionalliga Nord	26	0	—		—		—		—		26	0
Hannover 96 II	2015–16	Regionalliga Nord	28	0	—		—		—		—		28	0
Hannover 96 II	2016–17	Regionalliga Nord	1	0	—		—		—		—		1	0
Hannover 96 II	2017–18	Regionalliga Nord	9	0	—		—		—		—		9	0
Hannover 96 II	Total		80	0	—		—		—		—		80	0
Hannover 96	2016–17	2. Bundesliga	2	0	3	0	—		—		0	0	5	0
Hannover 96	2017–18	Bundesliga	0	0	0	0	—		—		—		0	0
Hannover 96	2018–19	Bundesliga	1	0	0	0	—		—		—		1	0
Hannover 96	Total		3	0	3	0	—		—		0	0	6	0
Rapid Wien II (loan)	2013–14	Austrian Regionalliga	5	0	—		—		—		—		5	0
Rapid Wien (loan)	2013–14	Austrian Bundesliga	1	0	0	0	—		0	0	—		1	0
1. FC Nürnberg II (loan)	2014–15	Regionalliga Bayern	14	0	—		—		—		—		14	0
1. FC Nürnberg (loan)	2014–15	2. Bundesliga	0	0	0	0	—		—		—		0	0
Brann (loan)	2018	Eliteserien	22	0	2	0	—		—		—		24	0
Barnsley	2019–20	Championship	18	0	0	0	0	0	—		—		18	0
SV Ried	2020–21	Austrian Bundesliga	27	0	2	0	—		—		—		29	0
SV Ried	2021–22	Austrian Bundesliga	31	0	5	0	—		—		—		36	0
SV Ried	2022–23	Austrian Bundesliga	26	0	2	0	—		—		—		28	0
SV Ried	Total		84	0	9	0	—		—		—		93	0
Austria Wien	2024–25	Austrian Bundesliga	32	0	0	0	—		2 (Note: Appearance(s) in UEFA Conference League)	0	—		34	0
Austria Wien	2025–26	Austrian Bundesliga	32	0	0	0	—		4	0	—		36	0
Austria Wien	2026–27	Austrian Bundesliga	3	0	0	0	—		6	0	—		9	0
Austria Wien	Total		67	0	0	0	—		12	0	—		79	0
Almere City (loan)	2023–24	Eredivisie	6	0	2	0	—		—		—		8	0
Career total			325	0	16	0	0	0	12	0	0	0	353	0
