= 1993–94 Austrian Cup =

Tournament details
- Country: Austria

Final positions
- Champions: Austria Wien
- Runners-up: FC Linz

The 1993–94 Austrian Cup (German: ÖFB-Cup) was the 60th season of Austria's nationwide football cup competition. The final was held at the Ernst-Happel-Stadion, Vienna on 11 June 1994.

The competition was won by Austria Wien after beating FC Linz 4–0.

== First round ==
Team 1	Score	Team 2
27 July 1993
SK Mittersill	1–3	ESV Saalfelden
USK Anif	0–0 (a.e.t.) (4–3 p)	SV Hallwang
WSK Kaprun	6–2	SV Wals-Grünau
28 July 1993
FC Vils	1–3	SV Hall
4 August 1993
ATSV Wolfsberg	0–2	WSG Wietersdorf
SAK Klagenfurt	2–0 (a.e.t.)	Wolfsberger AC
Union Matrei	1–0	SVG Bleiburg
Villacher SV	1–1 (a.e.t.) (2–3 p)	Friesacher AC
6 August 1993
ASK Baumgarten	4–1	SC Eisenstadt
ASK-BSC Bruck/Leitha	2–0	ASV Hohenau
SV Horn	2–5	SC Untersiebenbrunn
7 August 1993
ASK Hirm	0–1	SV Rohrbach
EPSV Gmünd	2–4	SC Zwettl
FC Waidhofen/Ybbs	3–0	Badener AC
SV Flavia Solva	2–1	LUV Graz
ISS Admira Landhaus	0–5	Floridsdorfer AC
Kapfenberger SV	1–3	ASK Voitsberg
Ostbahn XI Wien	0–4	SV Schwechat
Rot-Weiß Knittelfeld	2–4	TSV Hartberg
SV Alpine Kindberg	4–4 (a.e.t.) (3–1 p)	Deutschlandsberger SC
SV Axams	4–0	SV Haiming
SV Donau Wien	1–8	SV Gerasdorf
SV Eibiswald	1–3	SV Gratkorn
SV Leibnitz	3–2 (a.e.t.)	SV Feldbach
SV Wienerfeld	4–1	FC ÖMV Stadlau
Slovan/HAC	4–3 (a.e.t.)	SR Donaufeld
UFC Tadten	5–1	SV Sigleß
Wacker Innsbruck Amateure	1–0	SC Kundl
ASK Klingenbach	1–0	SV Mattersburg
10 August 1993
ASK Marienthal	4–1	ASK Ybbs
SC Austria Lustenau	0–2	Schwarz-Weiß Bregenz
FC Koblach	1–4	FC Dornbirn
11 August 1993
SC Rheindorf Altach	0–1	FC Hard
14 August 1993
Amateure Steyr	1–3	SV Grieskirchen
SC Marchtrenk	0–3	Eintracht Wels
SK St. Magdalena	3–8	SV Traun
Union St. Florian	0–1	Austria Tabak Linz
Union Weißkirchen	5–2 (a.e.t.)	ASKÖ Steyrermühl
17 August 1993
1. SV Wiener Neudorf	3–0	Kremser SC
ASK Kottingbrunn	1–0	SV Stockerau
ATSV Lenzing	2–3 (a.e.t.)	SV Ried
Columbia XXI Wien	1–2 (a.e.t.)	Favoritner AC
Donau Linz	5–2 (a.e.t.)	SV Braunau
FC Deutschkreutz	0–4	SV Oberwart
FC Salzburg	1–2	FC Puch
SC Hochwolkersdorf/Bromberg	1–2	1. SC Wiener Neustadt
SC Fürstenfeld	0–1	Grazer AK
SK Altheim	0–4	FC Linz
SK Treibach	1–3 (a.e.t.)	SV Spittal/Drau
FC Zell am See	1–6	FC Kufstein
SV Wörgl	1–3 (a.e.t.)	WSG Wattens
UFC St. Peter/Au	1–6	DSV Leoben
Union Esternberg	5–3	Linzer ASK
Wacker Wien	0–5	First Vienna FC

== Second round ==
Team 1	Score	Team 2
8 September 1993
ASK Baumgarten	3–0	ASK Marienthal
10 September 1993
1. SV Wiener Neudorf	1–5	1. SC Wiener Neustadt
Donau Linz	0–3	Grazer AK
SV Rohrbach	0–4	VSE St. Pölten
Slovan/HAC	1–5	SK Rapid Wien
TSV Hartberg	2–1	Friesacher AC
USK Anif	1–7	SV Austria Salzburg
11 September 1993
ASK-BSC Bruck/Leitha	0–1	ASK Kottingbrunn
ASK Klingenbach	0–0 (a.e.t.) (4–5 p)	VfB Mödling
ASK Voitsberg	4–5 (a.e.t.)	FC Linz
ESV Saalfelden	0–1	Schwarz-Weiß Bregenz
FC Dornbirn	2–3	FC Wacker Innsbruck
SV Gratkorn	0–1	SK Vorwärts Steyr
FC Waidhofen/Ybbs	1–3	FK Austria Wien
SV Flavia Solva	2–1 (a.e.t.)	SV Ried
Floridsdorfer AC	0–2	Wiener Sport-Club
FC Hard	0–1	FC Puch
SC Untersiebenbrunn	0–4	Admira Wacker
SC Zwettl	4–0	Favoritner AC
SV Axams	5–1 (a.e.t.)	WSG Wattens
SV Gerasdorf	2–4	SV Schwechat
SV Grieskirchen	1–0	Union Weißkirchen
SV Traun	1–0	DSV Leoben
SV Wienerfeld	0–5	First Vienna FC
UFC Tadten	3–4	SV Oberwart
Union Esternberg	2–2 (a.e.t.) (4–5 p)	Austria Tabak Linz
Union Matrei	2–3	SV Spittal/Drau
WSG Wietersdorf	2–3	SV Alpine Kindberg
WSK Kaprun	2–5	SV Hall
Wacker Innsbruck Amateure	0–8	FC Kufstein
12 September 1993
Eintracht Wels	2–8	SK Sturm Graz
SV Leibnitz	0–0 (a.e.t.) (3–4 p)	SAK Klagenfurt

== Third round ==
Team 1	Score	Team 2
15 October 1993
1. SC Wiener Neustadt	2–0	VSE St. Pölten
ASK Baumgarten	1–2	Wiener Sport-Club
FC Linz	4–1	SK Sturm Graz
Schwarz-Weiß Bregenz	1–0	SV Spittal/Drau
16 October 1993
ASK Kottingbrunn	2–1	VfB Mödling
Austria Tabak Linz	0–1	SV Oberwart
SV Flavia Solva	1–5	SV Austria Salzburg
SAK Klagenfurt	2–0	FC Kufstein
SC Zwettl	1–5	First Vienna FC
SV Alpine Kindberg	1–2	FC Puch
SV Axams	2–4	SK Vorwärts Steyr
SV Grieskirchen	2–5	FK Austria Wien
SV Hall	0–3	Grazer AK
SV Schwechat	0–6	SK Rapid Wien
SV Traun	0–1	Admira Wacker
TSV Hartberg	0–3	FC Wacker Innsbruck

== Fourth round ==
Team 1	Score	Team 2
1 April 1994
Schwarz-Weiß Bregenz	0–2	FC Wacker Innsbruck
2 April 1994
ASK Kottingbrunn	0–0 (a.e.t.) (2–1 p)	1. SC Wiener Neustadt
Admira/Wacker	1–0	SK Rapid Wien
FK Austria Wien	2–1	SV Austria Salzburg
Grazer AK	1–0	SK Vorwärts Steyr
SAK Klagenfurt	0–0 (a.e.t.) (5–4 p)	First Vienna FC
SV Oberwart	0–1 (a.e.t.)	Wiener Sport-Club
3 April 1994
FC Puch	1–2	FC Linz

== Quarter-finals ==
Team 1	Score	Team 2
26 April 1994
ASK Kottingbrunn	1–4	FC Linz
Grazer AK	2–1 (a.e.t.)	FC Wacker Innsbruck
SAK Klagenfurt	0–2	Admira/Wacker
27 April 1994
FK Austria Wien	3–1 (a.e.t.)	Wiener Sport-Club

== Semi-finals ==
Team 1	Score	Team 2
10 May 1994
Admira/Wacker	0–5	FK Austria Wien
FC Linz	3–1	Grazer AK

== Final ==
11 June 1994
16:05

FK Austria Wien	4–0	FC Linz
Zsak 40' (pen.); Prosenik 74'; Narbekovas 80'; Stöger 90'	Report

Ernst-Happel-Stadion, Vienna
Attendance: 6,000
Referee: Gerd Grabher
