= Matteo Schablas =

Austrian left-back (born 2005)

Personal information
- Date of birth: 14 March 2005 (age 21)
- Place of birth: Aichach, Germany
- Height: 1.80 m (5 ft 11 in)
- Positions: Full-back; winger

Team information
- Current team: Austria Wien
- Number: 21

Youth career
- 2009–2014: TSV Inchenhofen
- 2014–2015: FC Augsburg
- 2015–2023: Bayern Munich

Senior career*
Years	Team	Apps	(Gls)
2023–2025	FC Liefering	14	(0)
2025–	Austria Wien	9	(1)
2025–	Austria Wien II	11	(0)
2025	→ SV Stripfing (loan)	7	(2)

International career^{‡}
2022–2023	Austria U18	6	(0)
2023–2024	Austria U19	6	(0)
2025–	Austria U21	0	(0)
- * Club domestic league appearances and goals as of 31 May 2026 ‡ National team caps and goals as of 8 September 2025

Matteo Schablas (born 14 March 2005) is an Austrian professional footballer who plays as a full-back and winger for Austrian Bundesliga club Austria Wien. Born in Germany, he is an Austria youth soccer international.

== Early career ==
Schablas was born in Aichach, Germany, and joined the Bayern Munich youth academy in 2015.

== Club career ==
Schablas joined FC Liefering on 1 July 2023. He made his professional debut against FC Dornbirn on 28 July 2023.

On 31 January 2025, Schablas joined Austria Wien on a three and a half year contract, running until June 2028. Initially, he joined SV Stripfing on loan as a collaboration on 31 January 2025.
