= Philipp Maybach =

Austrian footballer (born 2007)

Personal information
- Date of birth: 14 December 2007 (age 18)
- Place of birth: Vienna, Austria
- Height: 1.90 m (6 ft 3 in)
- Position: Midfielder

Team information
- Current team: Austria Wien
- Number: 6

Youth career
- –2021: FV Austria XIII
- 2021: First Vienna
- 2021–2024: Austria Wien

Senior career*
Years	Team	Apps	(Gls)
2024–2026	Young Violets	17	(1)
2024–	Austria Wien	31	(0)
2025	→ SV Stripfing (loan)	8	(0)

International career^{‡}
2023	Austria U16	1	(0)
2024	Austria U17	5	(0)
2024–2025	Austria U18	7	(0)
2025–	Austria U19	8	(1)
- * Club domestic league appearances and goals as of 16 August 2026 ‡ National team caps and goals as of 31 March 2026

Philipp Maybach (born 14 December 2007) is an Austrian footballer who plays as a midfielder for Austrian Bundesliga club Austria Wien.

== Early life ==
Maybach was born on 14 December 2007 in Vienna, Austria. The son of Austrian lawyer Marian Maybach, he has two younger brothers, Jakob and Adrian.

== Career ==
As a youth player, Maybach joined the youth academy of FV Austria XIII before joining the youth academy of First Vienna FC in 2021. The same year, he joined the youth academy of FK Austria Wien, where he started his senior career. On 18 August 2024, he debuted for the club during a 1–1 away draw with TSV Hartberg in the league. On 5 October 2024, he first started for them during a 2–1 home win over Grazer AK in the league.
