= Ferdinand Janotka =

Austrian footballer and manager

Personal information
- Date of birth: 17 October 1945 (age 81)
- Place of birth: Vienna, Austria
- Position: Defender

Senior career*
Years	Team	Apps	(Gls)
–1968	FK Austria Wien	9	(0)
1968	WSG Radenthein		
1968–1969	Austria Salzburg	1	(0)
1969–1970	Holland Sport		
1971–1973	Wiener Sport-Club	12	(0)
1973–1974	FK Austria WAC Wien	8	(0)
1974–1976	SC Eisenstadt	21	(0)
1976	Casino Baden AC		

Managerial career
- 1987–1988: FK Austria Wien
- 1990–1991: Wiener Sport-Club
- 1992–1993: SR Donaufeld
- 1995: SR Donaufeld
- 2005–2006: First Vienna (director of football)
- * Club domestic league appearances and goals

Ferdinand Janotka (born 17 October 1945) is a former international Austrian football player and manager.

His last job was working as the director of football of First Vienna.
