= Wilhelm Vorsager =

Austrian footballer and model

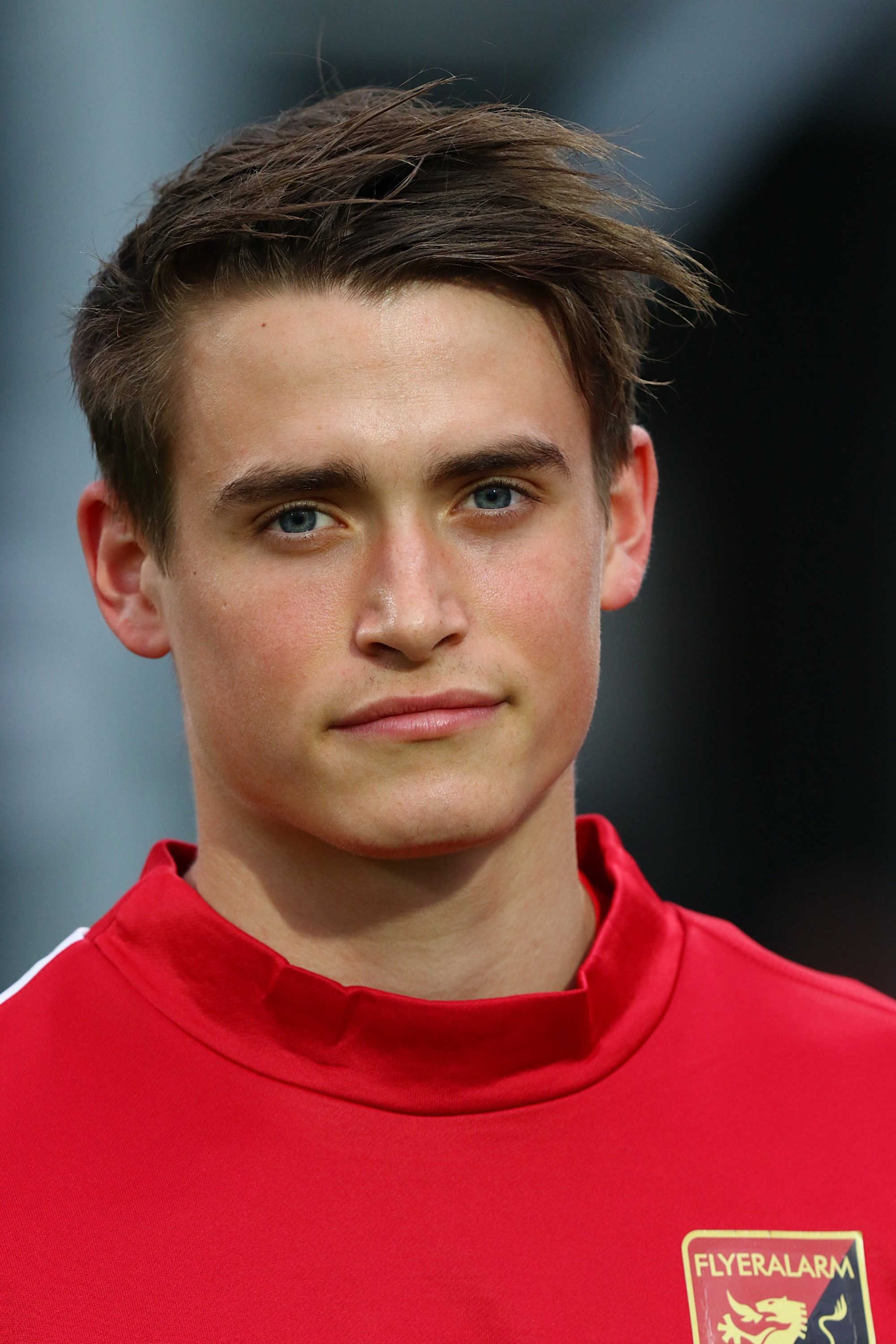
- Vorsager with Admira Wacker in 2018

Personal information
- Date of birth: 29 June 1997 (age 29)
- Place of birth: Baden bei Wien, Austria
- Height: 1.89 m (6 ft 2 in)
- Position: Midfielder

Team information
- Current team: Austria Wien II
- Number: 2

Youth career
- 2003–2015: Admira Wacker

Senior career*
Years	Team	Apps	(Gls)
2015–2021	Admira Wacker II	63	(1)
2017–2024	Admira Wacker	139	(7)
2024	Start	13	(1)
2025	SV Stripfing	18	(1)
2026–	Austria Wien II	8	(0)

International career
2014–2015	Austria U18	4	(1)
2016	Austria U19	2	(0)
- * Club domestic league appearances and goals as of 17 May 2026

Wilhelm Vorsager (born 29 June 1997) is an Austrian professional footballer who plays as a midfielder for Austria Wien II. He has also worked as a model.

== Club career ==
Vorsager began his career with Admira Wacker, where he progressed through the youth academy. On 8 May 2015 he made his debut for the reserve team, Admira Wacker Amateure in the Austrian Regionalliga, coming off the bench for Markus Pavić in the 35th minute in a 2–2 draw against Rapid Wien II. In the same month he made his first appearance in the starting eleven in a game against SV Mattersburg II.

After more than 40 appearances for the reserves, he was included in the first-team squad for the first time April 2017 for the league match against Rheindorf Altach. He would, however, make his Austrian Football Bundesliga debut on 16 December 2017 in another game against Rheindorf Altach, also scoring his first goal in a 3–1 as he featured in the starting lineup. On 20 December, the long-term extension of his contract with Admira was announced. Vorsager signed another contract extension in May 2022 until summer 2024.

On 1 August 2024, Vorsager joined Norwegian First Division club IK Start, after his contract at Admira wasn't extended.

On 7 February 2025, Vorsager joined SV Stripfing.

== International career ==
Vorsager made his debut for Austria U18 in September 2014 in a friendly against Norway U18. He scored his first goal in May 2015 with the winning goal in a 1–0 victory against rivals Germany.

In May 2016, he made his debut for the national under-19 team. He was then called up to the squad for the 2016 UEFA European Under-19 Championship. His only appearance was in the last group game against Germany, when he was in the starting eleven and was replaced by Sandi Lovrić at half-time. After that, Austria were eliminated as bottom of the group.

== Modeling career ==
In addition to his career as a football player, Vorsager has also been active as a model under the stage name Sascha Wolf.
