= Sanel Šaljić =

Austrian footballer (born 2007)

Personal information
- Full name: Sanel Šaljić
- Date of birth: 27 November 2005 (age 20)
- Place of birth: Vienna, Austria
- Height: 1.77 m (5 ft 10 in)
- Position: Midfielder

Team information
- Current team: Austria Wien
- Number: 20

Youth career
- 2011–2014: Schwechat
- 2014–2028: Admira Wacker
- 2018–2021: Austria Wien

Senior career*
Years	Team	Apps	(Gls)
2024–2025	Austria Wien II	53	(4)
2024–	Austria Wien	25	(1)
2024–2025	→ Stripfing (loan)	36	(6)

International career^{‡}
2021–2022	Austria U17	6	(0)
2023	Austria U18	1	(0)
2024	Austria U19	1	(0)
2025	Austria U21	1	(0)
- * Club domestic league appearances and goals as of 10 June 2026 ‡ National team caps and goals as of 18:22, 1 May 2026 (UTC)

Sanel Šaljić (born 27 November 2005) is an Austrian professional footballer who plays as a midfielder for Austrian Football Bundesliga club Austria Wien.

== Club career ==
Šaljić is a product of the youth academies of the Austrian clubs Schwechat, Admira Wacker and Austria Wien. On 30 March 2022, he signed a perspective contract with Austria Wien, and was promoted to their reserves for 2024. On 31 January 2024, he started playing with Stripfing as a cooperation player. On 6 July 2024, he signed a professional contract with Austria Wien until 2028. On 24 January 2026, he extended his contract with the club until 2030.

== International career ==
Born in Austria, Šaljić is of Bosnian descent. A youth international for Austria, Šaljić was first called up to the Austria U21s in September 2025.
