= Kelvin Boateng =

Ghanaian footballer

Personal information
- Full name: Kelvin Owusu Boateng
- Date of birth: 24 March 2000 (age 26)
- Place of birth: Accra, Ghana
- Height: 1.84 m (6 ft 0 in)
- Position: Forward

Team information
- Current team: Austria Wien
- Number: 14

Youth career
- 2015–2018: Right to Dream
- 2018–2020: Aves

Senior career*
Years	Team	Apps	(Gls)
2020–2021	Aves	2	(0)
2020–2021	→ Porto B (loan)	22	(4)
2021–2023	Spartak Trnava	34	(5)
2023	→ Karviná (loan)	8	(1)
2023–2025	First Vienna	43	(21)
2025–	Austria Wien	23	(4)

International career^{‡}
2026–	Uganda	3	(1)
- * Club domestic league appearances and goals as of 16 August 2026 ‡ National team caps and goals as of 2 October 2026

Kelvin Owusu Boateng (born 24 March 2000) is a professional footballer who plays as a forward for Austrian Bundesliga club Austria Wien. Born in Ghana, he plays for the Uganda national team.

== Club career ==
Boateng joined Aves in 2018 from the Right to Dream Academy. Boateng made his professional debut with Aves in a 1-0 Primeira Liga loss to Moreirense F.C. on 29 June 2020.

In 2020, he joined Porto B on loan.

== International goals ==
As of match played 1 October 2026

Scores and results list Uganda's goal tally first, score column indicates score after each Boateng goal.

List of international goals scored by Kelvin Boateng
No.	Date	Venue	Opponent	Score	Result	Competition
1	1 October 2026	FNB Stadium, Johannesburg, South Africa	DR Congo	2–0	2–0	Friendly

== Honours ==
Spartak Trnava

- Slovak Cup: 2021–22

MFK Karviná

- Czech National Football League: 2022–23
