= Lee Tae-seok =

South Korean footballer (born 2002)

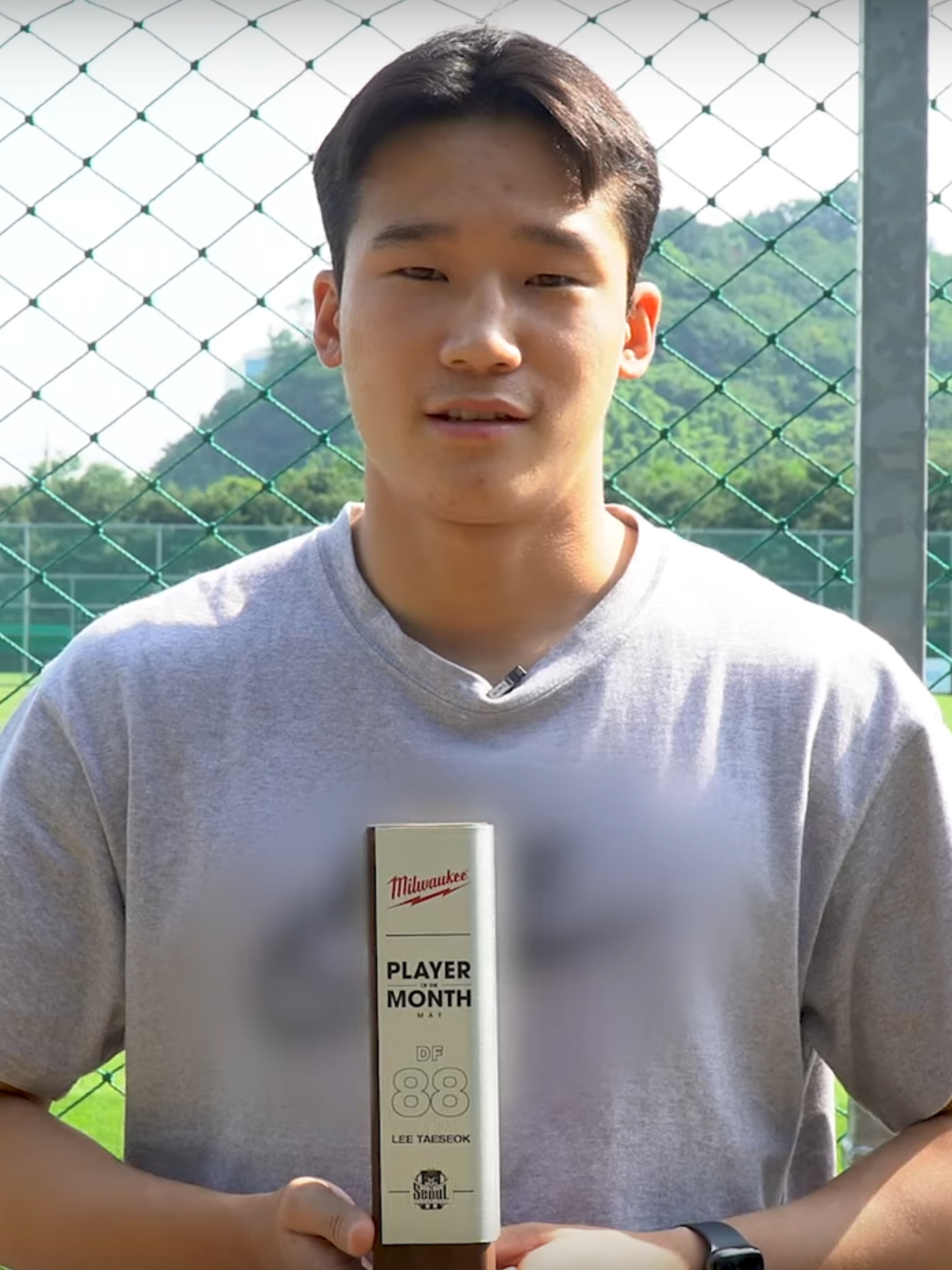
- Lee in 2021

Personal information
- Date of birth: 28 July 2002 (age 24)
- Place of birth: Incheon, South Korea
- Height: 1.74 m (5 ft 9 in)
- Positions: Left-back; left winger

Team information
- Current team: Austria Wien
- Number: 17

Youth career
- 2015–2020: FC Seoul academy

Senior career*
Years	Team	Apps	(Gls)
2021–2024	FC Seoul	89	(0)
2024–2025	Pohang Steelers	34	(2)
2025–	Austria Wien	41	(3)

International career^{‡}
2016	South Korea U14	4	(3)
2017–2019	South Korea U17	15	(1)
2023–	South Korea U23	14	(0)
2024–	South Korea	19	(1)
- * Club domestic league appearances and goals as of 8 November 2026 ‡ National team caps and goals as of 28 September 2026

- Lee Tae-seok
- Hangul: 이태석
- Hanja: 李太錫
- RR: I Taeseok
- MR: I T'aesŏk
- IPA: [i.tʰɛ.sʌk̚]

Lee Tae-seok (Korean: 이태석; born 28 July 2002) is a South Korean professional footballer who plays as a left-back or left winger for Austria Wien and the South Korea national team. He is the son of South Korean footballer Lee Eul-yong.

== Club career ==
Lee joined FC Seoul in 2021.

He made his league debut on 7 April 2021, against Ulsan Hyundai.

On 1 August 2024, he moved from Seoul to Pohang Steelers in a trade with Kang Hyeon-mu.

== International career ==
Lee was part of the South Korea squad at the 2019 FIFA U-17 World Cup.

He made his debut for the senior South Korea national team on 14 November 2024 in a World Cup qualifier against Kuwait at the Jaber Al-Ahmad International Stadium. He substituted Lee Myung-jae in the 64th minute as South Korea won 3–1.

He made his first appearance for South Korea national team as a starter rather than a substitute on 20 March 2025, against Oman in the third Asian qualifying round of the North and Central American World Cup against Oman.

He started at left fullback in a World Cup qualifier against Jordan on 26 March and played the full 90 minutes, putting in a strong defensive performance, winning five of his six tackle attempts and winning all six ground ball contests.

Lee scored his first international goal on 18 November 2025 in a friendly against Ghana at the Seoul World Cup Stadium.

He was called up Myung-Bo Hong to be part of the 2026 FIFA World Cup squad.

== Style of play ==
Like his father, former soccer player Lee Eul-yong, he has a precise and sharp left foot. He can play wing and left fullback, and his wide vision and left-footed kick allow him to deliver sharp long passes and crosses. Once considered a weakness, his defense and physicality have improved greatly in recent years, and in the national team game he shut down Jordanian winger Al-Taamari to perfection.

== Career statistics ==
=== Club ===
As of 8 November 2026

Appearances and goals by club, season and competition
Club	Season	League			National cup (Note: Includes Korean FA Cup, Austrian Cup)		Continental		Other		Total	
Club	Season	Division	Apps	Goals	Apps	Goals	Apps	Goals	Apps	Goals	Apps	Goals
FC Seoul	2021	K League 1	19	0	0	0	—		—		19	0
FC Seoul	2022	K League 1	27	0	2	0	—		—		29	0
FC Seoul	2023	K League 1	30	0	1	0	—		—		31	0
FC Seoul	2024	K League 1	13	0	1	0	—		—		14	0
FC Seoul	Total		89	0	4	0	0	0	0	0	93	0
Pohang Steelers	2024	K League 1	12	1	3	0	5 (Note: Appearances in AFC Champions League Elite)	0	—		20	1
Pohang Steelers	2025	K League 1	22	1	0	0	2	0	—		24	1
Pohang Steelers	Total		34	2	3	0	7	0	0	0	44	2
Austria Wien	2025–26	Austrian Bundesliga	30	3	0	0	0	0	—		30	3
Austria Wien	2026–27	Austrian Bundesliga	11	0	3	0	3 (Note: Appearances in UEFA Conference League)	0	—		17	0
Austria Wien	Total		41	3	3	0	3	0	0	0	47	3
Career total			164	5	10	0	10	0	0	0	184	5

=== International ===
As of match played 28 September 2026

Appearances and goals by national team and year
National team	Year	Apps	Goals
South Korea	2024	1	0
South Korea	2025	12	1
South Korea	2026	6	0
Total		19	1

Scores and results list South Korea's goal tally first, score column indicates score after each Lee goal.

List of international goals scored by Lee Tae-seok
No.	Date	Venue	Opponent	Score	Result	Competition
1	18 November 2025	Seoul World Cup Stadium, Seoul, South Korea	Ghana	1–0	1–0	Friendly

== Honours ==
Pohang Steelers

- Korean FA Cup: 2024
