= Lee Kang-hee =

South Korean footballer (born 2001

Personal information
- Date of birth: 24 August 2001 (age 25)
- Place of birth: Gongju, South Korea
- Height: 1.91 m (6 ft 3 in)
- Position: Defensive midfielder

Team information
- Current team: Austria Wien
- Number: 16

Youth career
- 2011–2012: Yugu Elementary School
- 2013: Dangjin Gyeseong Elementary School
- 2014–2016: Shinpyeong Middle School
- 2017–2019: Shinpyeong High School

Senior career*
Years	Team	Apps	(Gls)
2020–2022	Suwon Samsung Bluewings	0	(0)
2022	→ Busan IPark (loan)	18	(0)
2023–2025	Gyeongnam FC	80	(2)
2025–	Austria Wien	29	(1)

International career^{‡}
2019	South Korea U20	1	(1)
2023–2024	South Korea U23	8	(0)
- * Club domestic league appearances and goals as of 20 September 2026 ‡ National team caps and goals as of 25 April 2024

Lee Kang-hee (Korean: 이강희; Hanja: 李康熙; born 24 August 2001) is a South Korean professional footballer who plays as a defensive midfielder for Austria Wien.

== Early life ==
Lee was born on 24 August 2001 in Gongju, South Korea. Growing up, he attended Yugu Elementary School in South Korea before attending Dangjin Gyeseong Elementary School in South Korea. Afterwards, he attended Shinpyeong Middle School in South Korea and Shinpyeong High School in South Korea.

== Club career ==
Lee started his career with South Korean side Suwon Samsung Bluewings in 2020, where he made zero league appearances and scored zero goals. In 2022, he was sent on loan to South Korean side Busan IPark, where he made eighteen league appearances and scored zero goals.

Following his stint there, he signed for South Korean side Gyeongnam FC, where he was vice-captain of the club and made eighty-two league appearances and scored two goals. Ahead of the 2025–26 season, he signed for Austrian side Austria Wien.

== International career ==
Lee is a South Korea youth international. During April 2024, he played for the South Korea national under-23 football team at the 2024 AFC U-23 Asian Cup.

== Style of play ==
Lee plays as a midfielder and is right-footed. South Korean news website Goal wrote in 2025 that his "strength, which allows him to play as a holding midfielder, center back, and even a striker, is his solid physique. With a height of 191cm, he is excellent at ball competition and controlling the ball. His active and smart defense is also considered his strength, and he has a wide field of vision and stable passing ability".

== Career statistics ==
=== Club ===
As of 20 September 2026

Appearances and goals by club, season and competition
Club	Season	League			National cup (Note: Includes Korean FA Cup, Austrian Cup)		Continental		Other		Total	
Club	Season	Division	Apps	Goals	Apps	Goals	Apps	Goals	Apps	Goals	Apps	Goals
Suwon Samsung Bluewings	2021	K League 1	0	0	2	0	—		—		2	0
Busan IPark (loan)	2022	K League 2	18	0	1	0	—		—		19	0
Gyeongnam FC	2023	K League 2	34	0	1	0	—		2 (Note: Appearances in K League promotion-relegation play-offs)	0	37	0
Gyeongnam FC	2024	K League 2	31	0	0	0	—		—		31	0
Gyeongnam FC	2025	K League 2	15	2	0	0	—		—		15	2
Gyeongnam FC	Total		80	2	1	0	—		2	0	83	2
Austria Wien	2025–26	Austrian Bundesliga	22	0	1	0	4 (Note: Appearance in UEFA Conference League)	0	—		27	0
Austria Wien	2026–27	Austrian Bundesliga	7	1	2	0	4	0	—		13	0
Austria Wien	Total		29	1	3	0	8	0	—		40	0
Career total			127	3	7	0	8	0	2	0	144	2
