= Florian Wustinger =

Austrian association footballer

Personal information
- Date of birth: 21 July 2003 (age 23)
- Place of birth: Vienna, Austria
- Height: 1.73 m (5 ft 8 in)
- Position: Midfielder

Team information
- Current team: Austria Wien
- Number: 22

Youth career
- 2009–2010: 1. SC Pfaffstätten
- 2010–2021: Austria Wien

Senior career*
Years	Team	Apps	(Gls)
2021–	Austria Wien II	23	(0)
2022–	Austria Wien	14	(0)

International career^{‡}
2022–	Austria U19	4	(0)
- * Club domestic league appearances and goals as of 10 June 2026 ‡ National team caps and goals as of 18:33, 7 June 2022 (UTC)

Florian Wustinger (born 21 July 2003) is an Austrian professional footballer who plays as a midfielder for Austria Wien.

== Career ==
Wustinger is a youth product of 1. SC Pfaffstätten and Rapid Wien, joining the latter's youth academy in 2010. Beginning his career with Austria Wien's reserves, He was promoted to their senior team in January 2022. He signed his first professional contract with the club on 22 March 2022. He made his senior debut with Austria Wien in a 2–0 Austrian Football Bundesliga win over SC Rheindorf Altach on 22 February 2022.

== International career ==
Wustinger represented the Austria U19s at the 2022 UEFA European Under-19 Championship.

== Personal life ==
Wustinger's father Jochen (* 1972) was a Bundesliga professional at Admira/Wacker, his grandfather Anton also played first-class at the WSC.
