= Ibrahim Buhari =

Nigerian footballer

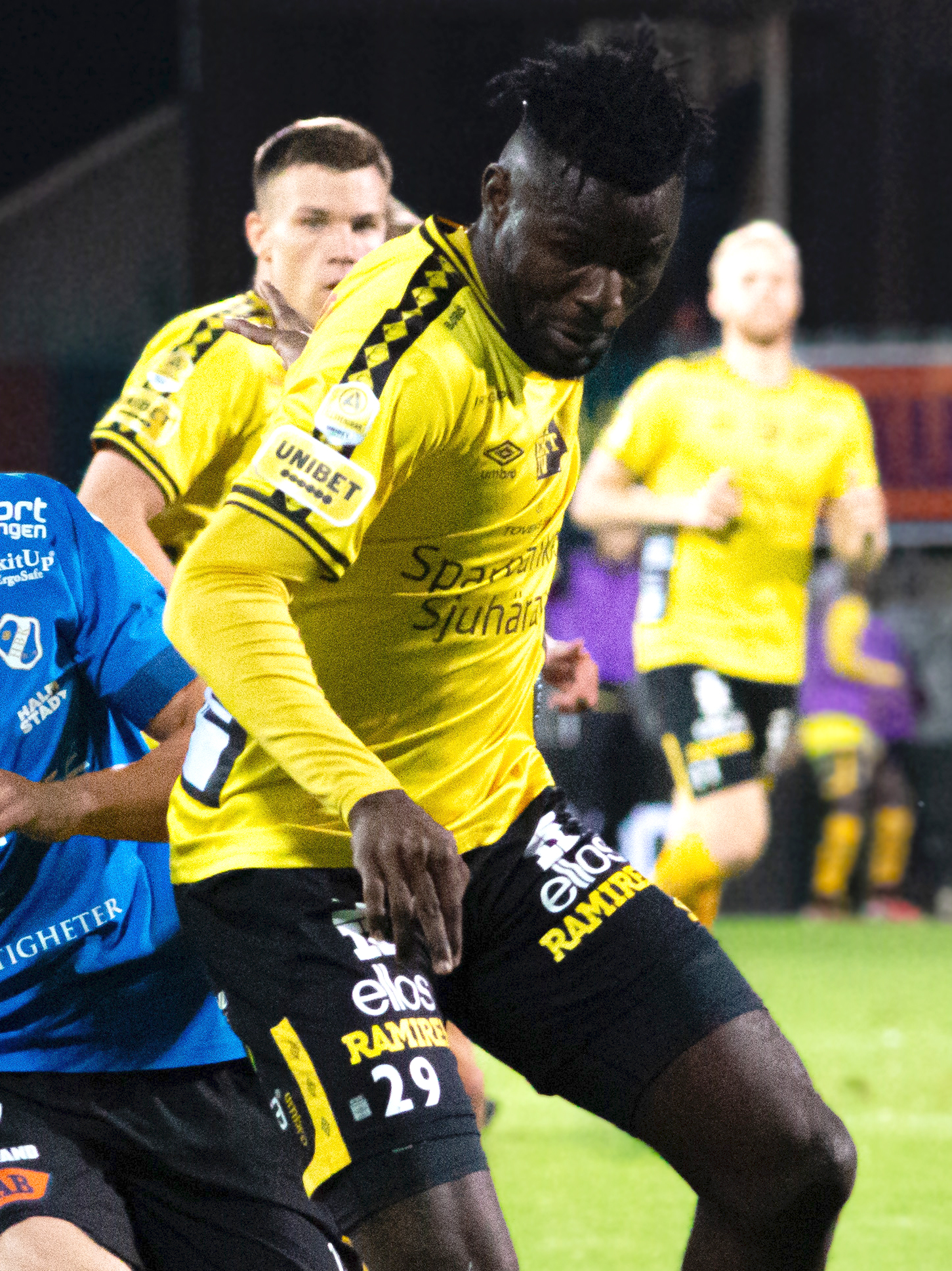

Personal information
- Date of birth: 8 October 2001 (age 25)
- Place of birth: Nigeria
- Height: 1.90 m (6 ft 3 in)
- Position: Centre-back

Team information
- Current team: Austria Wien
- Number: 3

Youth career
- Karamone FC

Senior career*
Years	Team	Apps	(Gls)
2019–2022	Plateau United	82	(9)
2022–2026	Elfsborg	61	(1)
2026–	Austria Wien	3	(0)

International career^{‡}
2023	Nigeria U23	1	(0)
- * Club domestic league appearances and goals as of 16 August 2026 ‡ National team caps and goals as of 14:30, 6 November 2023 (UTC)

Ibrahim Buhari (born 8 October 2001) is a Nigerian professional footballer who plays as a centre-back for Austrian Bundesliga club Austria Wien.

== Club career ==
Buhari was a starter for Plateau United in his second season with 6 goals in 38 matches, and helped them come second in the Nigeria Professional Football League. On 29 September 2022, he moved to the Swedish club Elfsborg on a contract until 2026.

In July 2026, Buhari signed for Austrian Bundesliga club Austria Wien after leaving Swedish side IF Elfsborg. Following the move, he stated that his ambition was to win titles with the club and help the team achieve success.

== International career ==
In May 2022, Buhari was called up to the senior Nigeria national team for a set of friendlies. In March 2023, he was called up to the Nigeria U23s for qualification matches for the 2024 Olympics.

== Playing style ==
Buhari is a strong and athletic centre-back with good passing skills. He is an offensive weapon during set pieces, and has a good eye for the game.
