= Hasan Deshishku =

Austrian footballer (born 2008)

Personal information
- Date of birth: 23 February 2008 (age 18)
- Place of birth: Vienna, Austria
- Height: 1.75 m (5 ft 9 in)
- Position: Striker

Team information
- Current team: Austria Wien
- Number: 74

Youth career
- 2014–2022: TWL Elektra
- 2022–2024: Austria Wien

Senior career*
Years	Team	Apps	(Gls)
2025–2026	Young Violets	26	(6)
2026–	Austria Wien	2	(0)

International career^{‡}
2023	Austria U15	4	(1)
2024	Austria U16	5	(2)
2024–2025	Austria U17	19	(7)
2026–	Austria U18	2	(0)
2026–	Austria U19	3	(1)
Medal record
Men's football
Representing Austria
FIFA U-17 World Cup
Runner-up	2025 Qatar
- * Club domestic league appearances and goals as of 16 August 2026 ‡ National team caps and goals as of 31 March 2026

Hasan Deshishku (born 23 February 2008) is an Austrian professional footballer who plays as a striker for Austrian Bundesliga club Austria Wien.

== Club career ==
Born in Vienna, Deshishku was trained by Austria Wien, where he began his professional career with the reserve team in the Austrian Regionalliga East, and with whom he obtained promotion to 2. Liga at the end of the 2024–25 season. During the following season he also took part in the Youth League after winning the national under-18 championship.

== International career ==
Born in Austria, Deshishku is of Kosovan-Albanian descent. He played for the Austria U15 team in 2023 and Austria U16 team in 2024. He was named as part of the Austria U-17 team that qualified for the 2025 FIFA U-17 World Cup. In the semi-final, Austria won against Italy and his team advanced to the first final in its history. Although they lost the final match (1–0 to Portugal), the Austrians' run to this first final in their history was hailed as a remarkable achievement, as they did not win a match in two previous World Cup appearances.

== Honours ==
Austria U17

- FIFA U-17 World Cup runner-up: 2025
