= Valentino Müller =

Austrian footballer

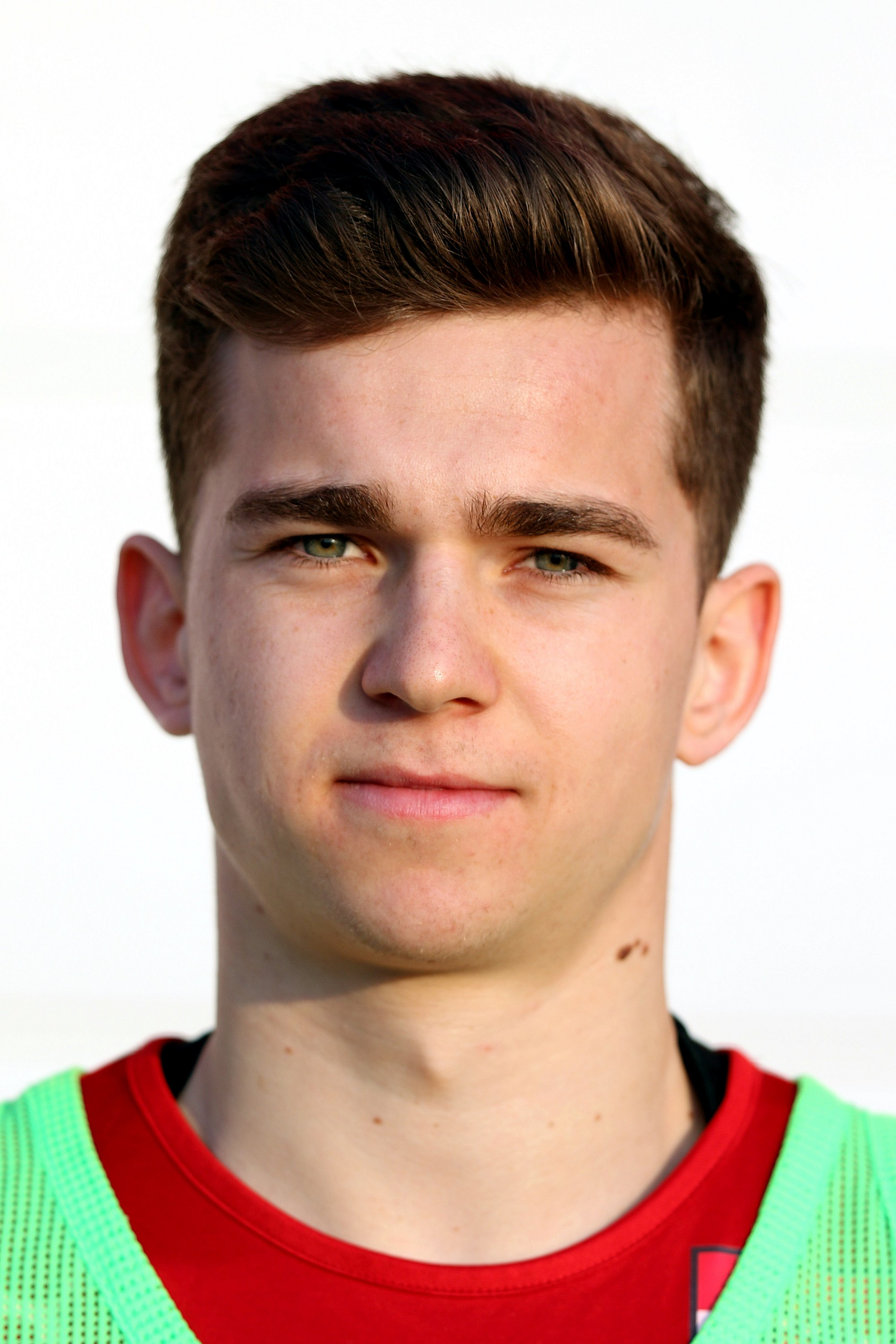

Personal information
- Date of birth: 19 January 1999 (age 27)
- Place of birth: Lustenau, Austria
- Height: 1.75 m (5 ft 9 in)
- Position: Midfielder

Youth career
- 2006–2013: Ludesch
- 2013–2016: Vorarlberg

Senior career*
Years	Team	Apps	(Gls)
2016–2019	Rheindorf Altach II	28	(1)
2016–2019	Rheindorf Altach	40	(0)
2019–2021	LASK	7	(1)
2019–2021	→ FC Juniors OÖ	31	(7)
2021–2026	WSG Tirol	137	(19)

International career
2014	Austria U15	2	(0)
2014–2015	Austria U16	12	(0)
2015–2016	Austria U17	13	(2)
2016–2017	Austria U18	6	(0)
2017–2018	Austria U19	8	(1)
2019–2020	Austria U21	6	(0)
- * Club domestic league appearances and goals as of 10 June 2026

Valentino Müller (born 19 January 1999) is an Austrian professional footballer who plays as a midfielder.

== Career ==
=== LASK ===
On 3 June 2019 LASK confirmed that Müller had joined the club on a four-year contract.

=== WSG Tirol ===
On 27 July 2021 he moved to WSG Tirol on a long-term contract.
