= 2025–26 Austrian Cup =

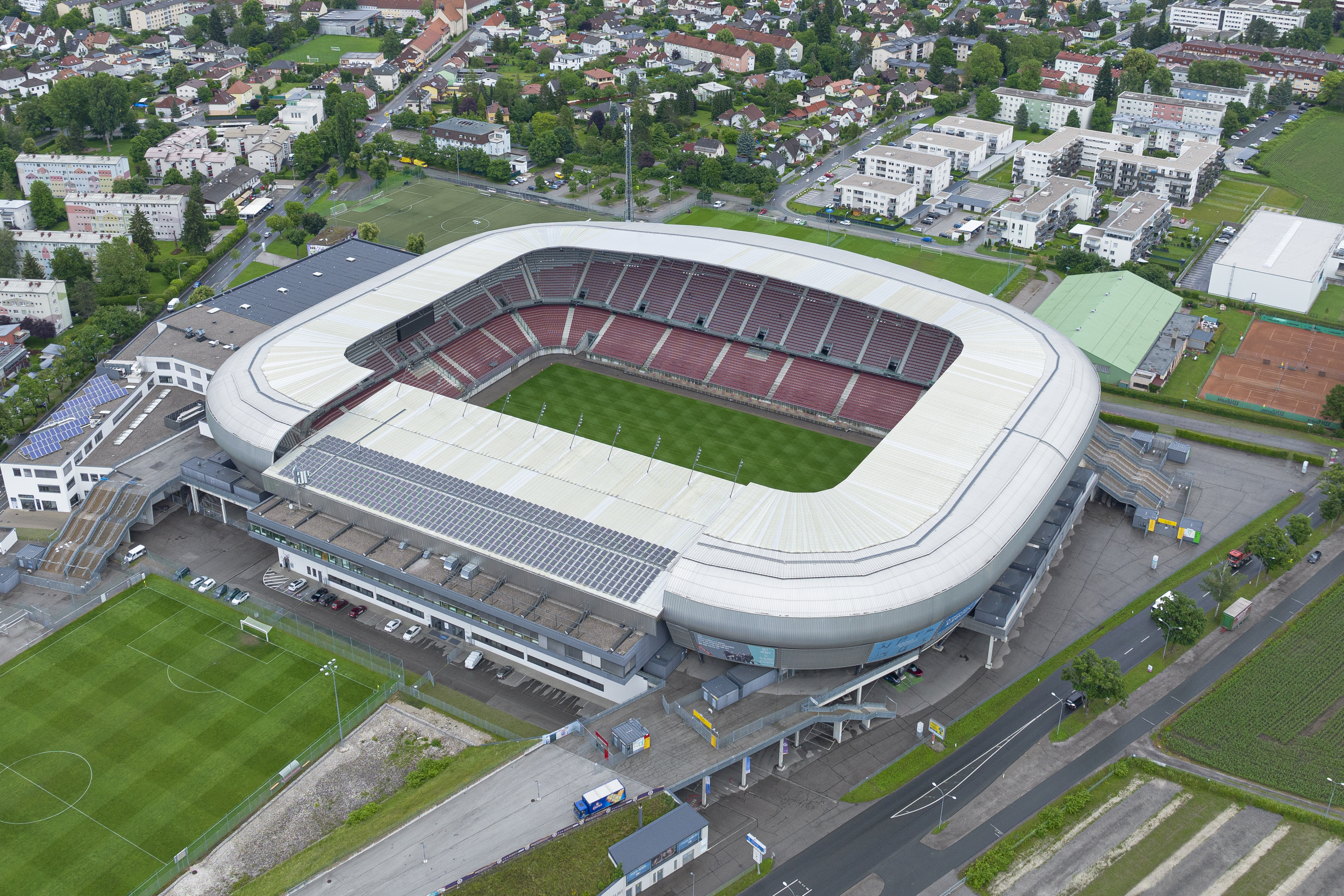
- Wörthersee Stadion hosted the final

Tournament details
- Country: Austria
- Teams: 64

Final positions
- Champions: LASK
- Runners-up: SCR Altach

The 2025–26 Austrian Cup was the 95th edition of the national cup in Austrian football. The winners qualified for the 2026–27 Europa League third qualifying round. Wolfsberg were the defending champions, having defeated Hartberg in the 2025 final, the first appearance for both in the cup final.
Match times up to 27 October 2025 and from 30 March 2026 are CEST (UTC+2). Times on interim ("winter") days are CET (UTC+1).

== Round dates ==
The schedule of the competition was as follows.

Round	Match date
First round	25–27 July 2025
Second round	26–28 August 2025
Third round	28–30 October 2025
Quarter-finals	30 January – 1 February 2026
Semi-finals	3–5 March 2026
Final	1 May 2026 at Wörthersee Stadion, Klagenfurt

== First round ==
Thirty-two first round matches were played between 25 and 27 July 2025. The draw was held on 18 June 2026, with former Austrian footballer and manager Wilhelm Kreuz acting as the "draw fairy", assisted by Angelo Gattermayer, who scored the winning goal in Wolfsberg's 2025 final victory.

Number of teams per tier still in competition
Bundesliga	2. Liga	Regionalliga	Landesliga	2. Landesliga	Total
12 / 12	12 / 12	32 / 32	7 / 7	1 / 1	64 / 64

25 July 2025	SR Donaufeld Wien (III)	0–4	Floridsdorfer AC (II)	Vienna
17ː30 CEST (UTC+2)	Schuster (yellow card) 50'; Widni (yellow card) 51'; Rusch (yellow card) 68'	Report	Piskule 11'; Aisowieren 33', 35'; Maier (yellow card) 43'; Gabbichler 48'	Stadium: Sportplatz Donaufeld; Attendance: 1,200; Referee: Alexander Harkam

25 July 2025	SVG Reichenau (III)	4–1	VfB Hohenems (III)	Reichenau
18ː00 CEST (UTC+2)	Plattner 21', 40'; Kleinlercher 30'; Abali (yellow card) 64'; Koric 81'	Report	Vater (yellow card) 25'; Ganahl (yellow card) 69'; Nagler 83'; Bacic (yellow card) 90+1'	Stadium: Sportplatz Reichenau; Attendance: 222; Referee: Armin Talic

25 July 2025	SPG Wallern/St. Marienkirchen (III)	1–3	Wolfsberger AC (I)	Wallern an der Trattnach
18ː00 CEST (UTC+2)	Humber (yellow card) 41'; Mitter 45+2' (yellow card) 55'; Huspek (yellow card) 58'; Straif (yellow card) 60'	Report	Avdijaj 26', 52'; Gattermayer (yellow card) 32'; Baumgartner (yellow card) 41'; Schöpf (yellow card) 72'; Zukić 88'	Stadium: Sportanlage Wallern; Attendance: 800; Referee: Philipp Maier

25 July 2025	SG Kremser SC / Rehberg KM I (III)	1–1 (a.e.t.) (2–3 p)	SKU Amstetten (II)	Wallern an der Trattnach
18ː00 CEST (UTC+2)	Eggenfellner 31'; Nachbagauer (yellow card) 36'; Koglbauer (yellow card) 37'	Report	Wimhofer (yellow card) 28' (yellow-red card) 36'; Peham (yellow card) 67' (goal) 85'; Wimmer (yellow card) 95'; Grubhofer (yellow card) 106'; Massimiani (yellow card) 118'	Stadium: Krems Stadion; Attendance: 800; Referee: Alain Sadikovski
	Penalties
	Temper (penalty missed); Yilmaz (penalty missed); Koppensteiner (penalty missed); Pemmer (penalty scored); Alexiev (penalty scored); Mehmedovic (penalty missed)		(penalty missed) Wimmer; (penalty scored) Eisschill; (penalty missed) Peham; (penalty missed) Kuffour; (penalty scored) Offenthaler; (penalty scored) Grubhofer

25 July 2025	SC-ESV Parndorf 1919 (III)	0–5	SV Ried (I)	Parndorf
18ː00 CEST (UTC+2)	Luxbacher (yellow card) 74'; Dornhackl (yellow card) 77'	Report	Große 35', 90' (yellow card) 76'; Rasner (yellow card) 48'; Buguo 73', 86'; Sollbauer 80'	Stadium: Heidebodenstadion; Attendance: 700; Referee: Cagri Demir

25 July 2025	Intemann FC Lauterach (III)	0–5	SC Schwaz (III)	Lauterach
19ː00 CEST (UTC+2)	Gasovich (yellow card) 48'; Gündogdu (yellow card) 90'	Report	Knoflach 18'; Jäkel 24'; Neurauter 37' (pen.); Alak 49'; Osuji 71'; Sahin (yellow card) 84'	Stadium: Bruno Pezzey Stadium; Attendance: 250; Referee: Paul Nisandzic

25 July 2025	SC Weiz (III)	0–3	Admira Wacker (II)	Weiz
19ː00 CEST (UTC+2)	Strobl (yellow card) 49'	Report	Forst 49'; Gemicibasi 75'; Schwarz 90+3'	Stadium: Strobl Arena Weiz; Attendance: 875; Referee: Jan Uwe Thiel

25 July 2025	ATUS Velden (III)	3–2	SC Neusiedl am See 1919 (III)	Velden am Wörther See
19ː00 CEST (UTC+2)	Zurga 9'; Mahrer 89'; Kiko 90+1'	Report	Dizdarevic 45', 66'	Stadium: Waldarena Velden; Attendance: 292; Referee: Gerald Bauernfeind

25 July 2025	Union Gurten (III)	6–2	SV Wals-Grünau (III)	Gurten
19ː00 CEST (UTC+2)	Bauer 3', 21'; Seiwald 23'; Oberwinkler 31'; Wimmleitner 64'; Krasniqi 90+4'	Report	Zikic (yellow card) 19', (goal) 58'; Lindner (yellow card) 32'; Brennsteiner 55'; Sabic (yellow card) 82'	Stadium: Park21-Arena; Attendance: 580; Referee: Tobias Eder

25 July 2025	SC Imst (III)	3–3 (a.e.t.) (1–3 p)	FC Hertha Wels (II)	Imst
19ː00 CEST (UTC+2)	Marberger (yellow card) 7'; Eller 19'; Casado (red card) 74'; Lamp 83'; Krismer (yellow card) 90+6'; Prantl 114'	Report	Radics (yellow card) 1'; Steinmann 9'; Schwaighofer 59'; Forjan 97'; Müller (yellow card) 104'	Stadium: Velly Arena; Attendance: 650; Referee: Jan Medwed
	Penalties
	Eller (penalty missed); Jovljevic (penalty missed); Krismer (penalty scored); Schultz (penalty missed)		(penalty missed) Feyrer; (penalty scored) Gashi; (penalty scored) Tischler; (penalty scored) Leite Da Silva

25 July 2025	SC Kalsdorf (III)	0–5	SKN St. Pölten (II)	Kalsdorf bei Graz
19ː00 CEST (UTC+2)	Salika (yellow card) 6'; Vrhovac (yellow card) 38'; Wlattnig (yellow card) 53'	Report	Amoah 21'; Hausjell 26'; Barlov 53', 69'; Stendera 60'; Krasniqi (yellow card) 68'	Stadium: Sportzentrum Kalsdorf; Attendance: 450; Referee: Marco Schlacher

25 July 2025	FC Marchfeld Donauauen (III)	6–1	UFC Jennersdorf (IV)	Mannsdorf an der Donau
19ː00 CEST (UTC+2)	Sagmeister 21' (pen.); Nowotny 39'; Heiden (yellow card) 61'; Helic 70'; Oroshi 77'; Meister 85'; Lalic 88'	Report	Dunkl (yellow card) 65', (goal) 90'; Andić (yellow card) 73'	Stadium: Aulandstadion; Attendance: 290; Referee: Faruk Celebi

25 July 2025	FC Dornbirn 1913 (III)	1–0	Grazer AK (I)	Dornbirn
19ː00 CEST (UTC+2)	Herbaly 6' (pen.); Stojnic (yellow card) 50'; Desnica (yellow card) 71'	Report	Fofana (yellow card) 75'	Stadium: Stadion Birkenwiese; Attendance: 1,000; Referee: Stjepan Bosnjak

25 July 2025	Union Vöcklamarkt (IV)	0–2	SW Bregenz (II)	Vöcklamarkt
19ː30 CEST (UTC+2)	Würtinger (yellow card) 47'; Schwamberger (yellow card) 58'; Barta (yellow card) 60'; Födinger (yellow card) 74'	Report	Schriebl 14'; Eloshvili 53'	Stadium: BLACK CREVICE - Stadion; Attendance: 850; Referee: Stefan Gamper

25 July 2025	SK Treibach (III)	0–3	Blau-Weiß Linz (I)	Althofen
19ː30 CEST (UTC+2)	Kovac (yellow card) 18'; Wachernig (yellow card) 50'	Report	Wähling 9'; Anderson (yellow card) 36', (goal) 70'; Pasic (yellow card) 38'; Ronivaldo 75'	Stadium: Turnerwald Stadion; Attendance: 800; Referee: Julian Edlinger

25 July 2025	SV Horn (III)	2–0	SK Austria Klagenfurt (II)	Horn
19ː30 CEST (UTC+2)	Mihailović 11'; Widor 17'; Güclü (yellow card) 45+3'; Surnovsky (yellow card) 56'; Kitenge (yellow card) 76' (yellow-red card) 86'	Report	Schmerböck (yellow card) 28'; Sinanovic (yellow card) 66'; Kitz (yellow card) 83'; Pschernig (yellow card) 84'; Jandrisevits (yellow card) 86'; Krnjic (yellow card) 90+3'	Stadium: Sparkasse Horn Arena; Attendance: 600; Referee: Arnes Talic

25 July 2025	SV Tillmitsch (IV)	1–3	First Vienna (II)	Tillmitsch
19ː30 CEST (UTC+2)	Lang 62'	Report	Zimmermann 1'; Abdijanovic 60', 71'; Ungar (yellow card) 89'	Stadium: Nunner Arena; Attendance: 1,000; Referee: Alexander Autherith

25 July 2025	FCM Traiskirchen (III)	0–4	WSG Tirol (I)	Traiskirchen
19ː30 CEST (UTC+2)	Maierhofer (yellow card) 33'; Lederer (yellow card) 62'; Odagaki (yellow card) 89'	Report	Anselm 22'; Lawrence (yellow card) 55'; Müller 70' (pen.); Sabitzer 72'; Hinterseer 79'; Gugganig (yellow card) 87'	Stadium: Sportzentrum Traiskirchen; Attendance: 400; Referee: Davor Divkovic

25 July 2025	SV Oberwart (III)	7–0	ATSV Wolfsberg (IV)	Oberwart
20ː00 CEST (UTC+2)	Stimac 8'; Siegl 15'; Halper 25'; Ried 29', 39', 62' (pen.); Wisak (yellow card) 74'; Hutter 86'	Report	Radl (yellow card) 61'; Ejoor (yellow card) 63'	Stadium: Oberwart Informstadion; Attendance: 550; Referee: Maximilian Fischer

25 July 2025	SK Bischofshofen (III)	0–4	Sturm Graz (I)	Bischofshofen
20ː30 CEST (UTC+2)	Laguns (yellow card) 41'; Gertig (yellow card) 67'	Report	Kiteishvili 9'; Safonov 11' (o.g.); Jatta 13'; Horvat (yellow card) 45+2'; Camara 86'	Stadium: Bischofshofen; Attendance: 1,499; Referee: Daniel Pfister

26 July 2025	SV Dinamo Helfort (IV)	1–2	Kapfenberger SV (II)	Vienna
16ː00 CEST (UTC+2)	Mala (yellow card) 12'; Ljevakovic 27'; Kalak (yellow card) 42'; Sokolovic (yellow card) 76'; Petrovic (yellow card) 85'	Report	Krasniqi (yellow card) 12'; Littig 38'; Miskovic (yellow card) 45+1'; Hassler (yellow card) 51'; Turi (yellow card) 69'; Prohart (yellow card) 84'; Maier 90+3'	Stadium: Helfort; Attendance: 700; Referee: Roman Smolinski

26 July 2025	SC Hirschwang (IV)	1–4	SCR Altach (I)	Reichenau an der Rax
17ː00 CEST (UTC+2)	Holzer (yellow card) 25'; Zondra (yellow card) 32' (yellow-red card) 38'; Krasniqi 48'; Stummer (yellow card) 61'	Report	Mustapha 6', 61'; Pichler 44' (o.g.); Estrada 88'	Stadium: Sportplatz Hirschwang; Attendance: 600; Referee: Safak Barmaksiz

26 July 2025	ASKÖ Oedt (III)	1–0	SV Austria Salzburg (II)	Traun
17ː00 CEST (UTC+2)	Alukwu 70'; Ammerer (yellow card) 85'; Mujanovic (yellow card) 90+3'	Report	Kalman (yellow card) 14'; Zia (yellow card) 62'; Eder (yellow card) 72'; Sorda (yellow card) 75'	Stadium: Transdanubia; Attendance: 1,100; Referee: Isa Simsek

26 July 2025	Wiener Sport-Club (III)	0–4	LASK (I)	Vienna
18ː00 CEST (UTC+2)	Röhricht (yellow card) 73'	Report	Adeniran 12', 28'; Andrade 15'; Lang 22'	Stadium: Naturarena Hohe Warte; Attendance: 3,500; Referee: Julian Schnur

26 July 2025	Union Dietach (III)	0–4	Red Bull Salzburg (I)	Dietach
18ː00 CEST (UTC+2)	Awuni (yellow card) 26'; Ketan (red card) 76'	Report	Nene 22'; Ratkov 52', 69'; Baidoo (yellow card) 59'; Terzić (red card) 76'; Alajbegović 90'	Stadium: DietachArena; Attendance: 3,650; Referee: Emil Ristoskov

26 July 2025	SV Kuchl (III)	2–3	SC Austria Lustenau (II)	Kuchl
18ː00 CEST (UTC+2)	Mühlbauer 13', (yellow card) 40'; Ratzer (yellow card) 37'; Schiedermeier 63' (pen.); Danner (yellow card) 65'; Kühleitner (yellow card) 74'	Report	Jastremski 6', (yellow card) 74'; Wade (yellow card) 41'; Schierl (red card) 44'; Ibertsberger (yellow card) 60'; Willian Rodrigues (yellow card) 62'; Delaye 75'; Ismailcebioglu 90'	Stadium: Andreas Wimmer Arena; Attendance: 650; Referee: René Kettlgruber

26 July 2025	SV Lafnitz (III)	2–5	TSV Hartberg (I)	Lafnitz
19ː00 CEST (UTC+2)	Syla 12' (pen.), (yellow card) 19'; Nenadic (yellow card) 51'; Markl 60'; Akrap (yellow card) 90'; Barić (yellow card) 90+3'	Report	Havel 15', 43'; Mijić 20', 54'; Wilfinger 65'	Stadium: Fußballarena; Attendance: 1,000; Referee: Markus Greinecker

26 July 2025	SC Retz (III)	0–5	SV Stripfing (II)	Retz
19ː00 CEST (UTC+2)	Vasiljevic (yellow card) 45+1', (red card) 82'; Yenigüc (yellow card) 57'; Schindler (yellow card) 61'	Report	Kreiker 6', 27'; Knasmüllner 42'; Gabryel (yellow card) 60'; Poldrugac 63'; Beaka 83'	Stadium: Sportplatz Retz SC; Attendance: 500; Referee: Sara Telek

26 July 2025	FC Lendorf (IV)	1–2	SV Donau (III)	Lendorf
19ː00 CEST (UTC+2)	Rumbold (yellow card) 3'; Mataln (yellow card) 21'; Brunner (yellow card) 25'; Steinthaler (yellow card) 40'; Zagler 51'; Oberwinkler (yellow card) 80'	Report	Beljan 35', (yellow card) 77'; Scherzadeh (yellow card) 37'; Muminovic 49'; Sahanek (yellow card) 83' (yellow-red card) 88'; Jenciragic (yellow card) 90'	Stadium: Thomas Morgenstern Arena; Attendance: 700; Referee: Thomas Ofner

27 July 2025	ASK Voitsberg (III)	3–2	Austria Wien (I)	Voitsberg
13ː00 CEST (UTC+2)	Pfingstner 23', (yellow card) 89'; Zivanovic 63'; Krienzer 65'; Scheucher (yellow card) 74'; Suppan (yellow card) 79'	Report	Plavotić (yellow card) 6'; Fischer (yellow card) 39'; Botic 45+1'; Malone 57'; Lee (yellow card) 73'; Ranftl (yellow card) 88'	Stadium: Münzer Bioindustrie Sportpark; Attendance: 2,500; Referee: Achim Untergasser

27 July 2025	FC Wacker Innsbruck (III)	0–1	Rapid Wien (I)	Innsbruck
17ː00 CEST (UTC+2)	Sy (yellow card) 77'; Krasniqi (yellow card) 90'	Report	Mbuyi (yellow card) 7'; Bolla (yellow card) 40', (goal) 78'; Sangare (yellow card) 88'	Stadium: Tivoli Stadion; Attendance: 15,753; Referee: Stefan Macanovic

27 July 2025	FC Pinzgau Saalfelden (III)	1–2	SC Röthis (IV)	Saalfelden am Steinernen Meer
17ː00 CEST (UTC+2)	Hucko (yellow card) 40', (goal) 57'	Report	Knoll 58'; Nachbaur 64', (yellow card) 88'; Hartmann (yellow card) 82'; Ströhle (yellow card) 85'; Wieser (yellow card) 90+3'	Stadium: SaalfeldenArena; Attendance: 245; Referee: Edis Skalic

== Second round ==
Sixteen second round matches were played between 26 and 27 August, and 16 and 17 September 2025. The draw was held on 27 July 2025, and was conducted by former national team player Lisa Makas.

Number of teams per tier still in competition
Bundesliga	2. Liga	Regionalliga	Landesliga	2. Landesliga	Total
10 / 12	10 / 12	11 / 32	1 / 7	0 / 1	32 / 64

26 August 2025	SC Austria Lustenau (II)	0–2	Kapfenberger SV (II)	Lustenau
18:30 CEST (UTC+2)	Diarra (yellow card) 22'; Maak (yellow card) 35'; Grabher (yellow card) 76'	Report	Toure (yellow card) 10'; Hassler 36' (pen.); Rostas 85'	Stadium: Planet Pure Stadion; Attendance: 2,071; Referee: Daniel Pfister

26 August 2025	FC Marchfeld Donauauen (III)	0–2	SW Bregenz (II)	Mannsdorf an der Donau
19:00 CEST (UTC+2)	Yesilöz (yellow card) 14'; Tegeltija (yellow card) 38'; Helic (yellow card) 65'; Kleinböck (yellow card) 90+4'	Report	Maksimovic 31'; Marte (yellow card) 32'; Stefanon 43'; Schriebl (yellow card) 67'; Eloshvili (yellow card) 88'	Stadium: Aulandstadion; Attendance: 500; Referee: Davor Divkovic

26 August 2025	FC Hertha Wels (II)	2–2 (a.e.t.) (4–5 p)	SKN St. Pölten (II)	Wels
19:00 CEST (UTC+2)	Brugger 3'; Feyrer (yellow card) 50'; Gashi (yellow card) 75'; Bošnjak (yellow card) 82'; Radics 87'	Report	Altersberger (yellow card) 35'; Thesker 45'; Dursun (yellow card) 50'; Krasniqi 82', (yellow card) 91'; Stendera (yellow card) 85'; Knett (yellow card) 87'	Stadium: HUBER Arena; Attendance: 1,300; Referee: Philip Gadler
	Penalties
	Bošnjak (penalty scored); Cirkovic (penalty scored); Luan (penalty missed); Gashi (penalty scored); Radics (penalty scored)		(penalty scored) Stendera; (penalty scored) Buchegger; (penalty scored) Skogen; (penalty scored) Hausjell; (penalty scored) Riegler

26 August 2025	Union Gurten (III)	0–1	SV Ried (I)	Gurten
19:30 CEST (UTC+2)	Wimmleitner (yellow card) 32'; Horner (yellow card) 68'; Seiwald (yellow card) 79'; Reiter (yellow card) 84'; Kreuzer (yellow card) 90+4'	Report	Grosse 13', (yellow card) 30'; Havenaar (yellow card) 85'; Mutandwa (yellow card) 87'	Stadium: Stadion der Stadt Ried; Attendance: 4,950; Referee: Stefan Ebner

26 August 2025	ASK Voitsberg (III)	1–4	Admira Wacker (II)	Voitsberg
19:30 CEST (UTC+2)	Stevanovic (yellow card) 31'; Pfingstner (yellow card) 52'; Jager (yellow card) 58', (goal) 65'; Sick (yellow card) 70'; Zivanovic (red card) 73'	Report	Ristanic 26', 59', 74'; Murgas (yellow card) 51'; Forst (yellow card) 63', (goal) 67'; Gemicibasi (yellow card) 76'	Stadium: Münzer Bioindustrie Sportpark Voitsberg; Attendance: 1,700; Referee: Safak Barmaksiz

26 August 2025	SKU Amstetten (II)	2–1	First Vienna FC (II)	Amstetten
19:30 CEST (UTC+2)	Eisschill (yellow card) 11'; Peham 36', (yellow card) 72'; Offenthaler (yellow card) 51'; Bauer 64' (o.g.); Grubhofer (yellow card) 83'	Report	Rosenberger (yellow card) 36'; Titkov (yellow card) 60'; Abdijanovic 86'	Stadium: Ertl Glas Stadion; Attendance: 1,350; Referee: Julian Schnur

27 August 2025	FC Dornbirn 1913 (III)	1–3	Red Bull Salzburg (I)	Dornbirn
18:00 CEST (UTC+2)	Makovec 40'; Stojnic (yellow card) 90+2'	Report	Alajbegović 20'; Ratkov 70'; Vertessen 83'; Yeo (yellow card) 90'	Stadium: Sparkasse Arena Birkenwiese; Attendance: 1,652; Referee: Stefan Macanovic

27 August 2025	ASKÖ Oedt (III)	1–3	WSG Tirol (I)	Traun
18:00 CEST (UTC+2)	Barisic 63'	Report	Hinterseer 40'; Anselm 43'; Ola-Adebomi 81'	Stadium: Transdanubia Sportanlage Kunstrasen; Attendance: 600; Referee: Manuel Baumann

27 August 2025	Floridsdorfer AC (II)	1–3	SV Stripfing (II)	Vienna
19:00 CEST (UTC+2)	Bitsche (yellow card) 44'; Schneider (yellow card) 67'; Aisowieren (yellow card) 76', (goal) 89'; Maier (yellow card) 86'	Report	Pecirep 24'; Stöckl (yellow card) 37'; Gabryel (yellow card) 53'; Cecchini Muller 55'; Koblar (yellow card) 65'; Beaka 87'	Stadium: FAC Platz; Attendance: 0 Referee: Florian Jäger

27 August 2025	SC Schwaz (III)	0–3	Blau-Weiß Linz (I)	Schwaz
20:30 CEST (UTC+2)	Sahin (yellow card) 36'; Alak (yellow card) 56'	Report	Strauss 54'; Seidl 64'; Anderson 74'	Stadium: Silberstadt Arena Schwaz Nebenspielfeld; Attendance: 750; Referee: Matthias Gächter

27 August 2025	ATUS Velden (III)	0–3 (a.e.t.)	TSV Hartberg (I)	Velden am Wörther See
20:30 CEST (UTC+2)	Guggenberger (yellow card) 47'; Lausegger (yellow card) 69'; Lorinson (yellow card) 93'	Report	Fridrikas (yellow card) 77'; Heil 96'; Prokop 99'; Hülsmann (yellow card) 116'; Mijić 117' (pen.)	Stadium: Sportplatz Velden; Attendance: 1,200; Referee: Cagri Demir

27 August 2025	SV Donau (III)	1–3	SCR Altach (I)	Leobendorf
20:30 CEST (UTC+2)	Cosic (yellow card) 8'; Peter 63'; Boguo (yellow card) 83'; Yazici (yellow card) 90+2'	Report	Diawara 12', (yellow card) 27'; Ingolitsch (yellow card) 33'; Bähre (yellow card) 77', (goal) 87'; Mustapha 85'	Stadium: Sportplatz Leobendorf; Attendance: 400; Referee: Philipp Maier

27 August 2025	SV Horn (III)	0–2	LASK (I)	Horn
20:30 CEST (UTC+2)		Report	Kačavenda 9'; Smakaj 31', (yellow card) 48'	Stadium: Sportplatz Horn; Attendance: 1,918; Referee: Emil Ristoskov

16 September 2025	SVG Reichenau (III)	0–6	Wolfsberger AC (I)	Innsbruck
18:00 CEST (UTC+2)		Report	Agyemang 4'; Wohlmuth 18'; Agbevor 19'; Gattermayer 58'; Dosso 62'; Renner 87'	Stadium: Sportanlage Reichenau; Attendance: 300; Referee: Arnes Talic

17 September 2025	SC Röthis (IV)	0–2	Sturm Graz (I)	Röthis
17:00 CEST (UTC+2)	Scheichl (yellow card) 49'; Sohler (yellow card) 79'	Report	Aiwu (yellow card) 23'; Rózga 26'; Malone (yellow card) 59', (goal) 90'	Stadium: Sportplatz an der Ratz; Attendance: 1,500; Referee: Stjepan Bosnjak

17 September 2025	SV Oberwart (III)	1–2	Rapid Wien (I)	Oberwart
19:00 CEST (UTC+2)	Ried 55' (pen.); Schendl (yellow card) 62'; Wessely (yellow card) 67'	Report	Gulliksen 20', 45+1'; Amane (yellow card) 54'; Ndzie (yellow card) 81'	Stadium: Informstadion; Attendance: 6,000; Referee: Julian Schnur

== Third round ==
Eight third round matches were played between 28 and 30 October 2025. The draw was held on 20 September 2025.

Number of teams per tier still in competition
Bundesliga	2. Liga	Regionalliga	Landesliga	2. Landesliga	Total
10 / 12	6 / 12	0 / 32	0 / 7	0 / 1	16 / 64

28 October 2025	Kapfenberger SV (II)	1–3 (a.e.t.)	SCR Altach (I)	Kapfenberg
20:30 CET (UTC+1)	N'Zi (yellow card) 10'; Touré 79'; Littig (yellow card) 92'; Turi (yellow card) 96'	Report	Ouédraogo (yellow card) 89'; Oswald 90+2'; Gugganig (yellow card) 90+2'; Hrstić 92', 105+1'	Stadium: Franz-Feteke-Stadion; Attendance: 700; Referee: Achim Untergasser

28 October 2025	Blau-Weiß Linz (I)	2–2 (a.e.t.) (5–4 p)	TSV Hartberg (I)	Linz
20:30 CET (UTC+1)	Moormann 29', 102'; Fofana (yellow card) 33'; Pasic (yellow card) 49'; Maranda (yellow card) 71'; Wähling (yellow card) 80'; Husković (yellow card) 92'	Report	Markuš (yellow card) 52'; Kovacevic (yellow card) 72'; Havel 83'; Wilfinger (yellow card) 103'; Heil (yellow card) 103'; Mijić 108'	Stadium: Hofmann Personal Stadion; Attendance: 3,010; Referee: Emil Ristoskov
	Penalties
	Pirkl (penalty scored); Goiginger (penalty scored); Pasic (penalty scored); Seidl (penalty scored); Wähling (penalty scored)		(penalty scored) Heil; (penalty scored) Fridrikas; (penalty missed) Mijić; (penalty scored) Prokop; (penalty scored) Havel

28 October 2025	SV Stripfing (II)	0–2	LASK (I)	Weikendorf
20:30 CET (UTC+1)	Vorsager (yellow card) 43'	Report	Andrade 43'; Cissé 61'; Flecker (yellow card) 73'; Michael (yellow card) 84'	Stadium: Sportplatz Stripfing; Attendance: 643; Referee: Florian Jäger

29 October 2025	Admira Wacker (II)	1–1 (a.e.t.) (9–10 p)	Sturm Graz (I)	Maria Enzersdorf
18:00 CET (UTC+1)	Schmidt 11', (yellow card) 81'; Olsa (yellow card) 79'	Report	Jatta (yellow card) 57'; Meisl 73' (o.g.); Malić (yellow card) 102'	Stadium: Datenpol Arena; Attendance: 4,500; Referee: Harald Lechner
	Penalties
	Gemicibaşi (penalty scored); Malicsek (penalty scored); Weberbauer (penalty scored); Meisl (penalty scored); Steiner (penalty missed); Tambwe-Kasengele (penalty scored); Schabauer (penalty scored); Olsa (penalty scored); Holzhacker (penalty scored); Haudum (penalty scored); Siebenhandl (penalty missed)		(penalty scored) Kiteishvili; (penalty missed) Grgić; (penalty scored) Horvat; (penalty scored) Kayombo; (penalty scored) Chukwuani; (penalty scored) Malić; (penalty scored) Lavalée (yellow card); (penalty scored) Gorenc Stanković; (penalty scored) Bignetti; (penalty scored) Geyrhofer; (penalty scored) Aiwu

29 October 2025	SW Bregenz (II)	0–1 (a.e.t.)	SV Ried (I)	Bregenz
19:00 CET (UTC+1)	Lüchinger (yellow card) 91'; Dirnberger (yellow card) 105'; Eloshvili (yellow card) 120+2'; Nussbaumer (yellow card) 120+2'	Report	Havenaar (yellow card) 88'; Bajlicz (yellow card) 97'; Steurer 120+2'	Stadium: ImmoAgentur Stadion; Attendance: 900; Referee: Markus Greinecker

29 October 2025	SKU Amstetten (II)	2–3 (a.e.t.)	Wolfsberger AC (I)	Amstetten
19:00 CET (UTC+1)	Peham 27'; Offenthaler 35'; Wimmer (yellow card) 65'; Wimhofer (yellow card) 81'; Pertlwieser (yellow card) 88' (yellow-red card) 88'; Deinhofer (yellow card) 88'	Report	Zukić 45+1'; Piesinger (yellow card) 47'; Gattermayer 59'; Agyemang (yellow card) 97'; Diabaté (yellow card) 110'; Kojzek 115'	Stadium: Ertl-Glas-Stadion; Attendance: 1,027; Referee: Stefan Ebner

29 October 2025	SKN St. Pölten (II)	0–1	Rapid Wien (I)	St. Pölten
20:30 CET (UTC+1)	Young (yellow card) 50'	Report	Kara 30'; Auer (yellow card) 51'; Seidl (yellow card) 89'	Stadium: NV Arena; Attendance: 8,076; Referee: Jakob Semler

30 October 2025	Red Bull Salzburg (I)	3–1 (a.e.t.)	WSG Tirol (I)	Wals-Siezenheim
19:00 CET (UTC+1)	Diambou (yellow card) 32'; Yeo 75'; Kjærgaard 93'; Bischoff 107'	Report	Ola-Adebomi (yellow card) 49'; Taferner (yellow card) 65'; Lawrence 68'; Böckle (yellow card) 90+1'; Stejskal (yellow card) 90+3'; Sabitzer (yellow card) 90+5'; Jaunegg (yellow card) 120+2'	Stadium: Red Bull Arena; Attendance: 5,016; Referee: Christian-Petru Ciochirca

== Quarter-finals ==
Four quarter-final matches were played between 30 January and 1 February 2026.

Number of teams per tier still in competition
Bundesliga	2. Liga	Regionalliga	Landesliga	2. Landesliga	Total
8 / 12	0 / 12	0 / 32	0 / 7	0 / 1	8 / 64

30 January 2026	LASK (I)	3–2	Blau-Weiß Linz (I)	Linz
18:00 CET (UTC+1)	Cissé (yellow card) 31'; Kalajdžić 35' (yellow card) 44'; Bello 57'; Usor 83'	Report	Dahlqvist 2'; Weissman 18'; Fofana (yellow card) 44'	Stadium: Raiffeisen Arena; Attendance: 17,498; Referee: Stefan Ebner

31 January 2026	SV Ried (I)	3–0	Rapid Wien (I)	Ried im Innkreis
17:30 CET (UTC+1)	Bajic 3'; Havenaar 61', 84'	Report	Ndzie (yellow card) 60'	Stadium: BWT X Upper Austrian Arena; Attendance: 6,920; Referee: Alexander Harkam

1 February 2026	Wolfsberger AC (I)	0–1	Red Bull Salzburg (I)	Wolfsberg
17:30 CET (UTC+1)	Sulzner (yellow card) 10'; Diabaté (red card) 18'; Avdijaj (yellow card) 41'	Report	Konaté 25'; Gadou (yellow card) 37'	Stadium: Lavanttal-Arena; Attendance: 3,025; Referee: Jakob Semler

1 February 2026	SCR Altach (I)	3–1 (a.e.t.)	Sturm Graz (I)	Altach
17:30 CET (UTC+1)	Greil 51', 105'; Ingolitsch (yellow card) 66'; Milojević (yellow card) 90+1'; Hrstić 102'	Report	Oermann (yellow card) 32' (yellow-red card) 78'; Koller (yellow card) 63'; Kayombo 71'	Stadium: CASHPOINT Arena; Attendance: 4,154; Referee: Julian Weinberger

== Semi-finals ==
Two semi-final matches were played on 4 and 18 March 2026.

Number of teams per tier still in competition
Bundesliga	2. Liga	Regionalliga	Landesliga	2. Landesliga	Total
4 / 12	0 / 12	0 / 32	0 / 7	0 / 1	4 / 64

4 March 2026	Red Bull Salzburg (I)	0–1	SCR Altach (I)	Wals-Siezenheim
18:00 CET (UTC+1)	Bidstrup (yellow card) 65'; Schlager (yellow card) 90+2'		Jäger 45+2'; Ouédraogo (yellow card) 63'; Yalcin (yellow card) 90+2'; Demaku (yellow card) 90+2'; Gorgon (yellow card) 90+4'	Stadium: Red Bull Arena; Attendance: 5,720; Referee: Walter Altmann

18 March 2026	SV Ried (I)	1–2 (a.e.t.)	LASK (I)	Ried im Innkreis
18:00 CET (UTC+1)	Rossdorfer 50'; Rasner (yellow card) 42'; Van Wyk (yellow card) 90+3'; Kiedl (yellow card) 114'		Adeniran 52'; Kačavenda 110'; Usor (yellow card) 82'; Modou Kéba Cissé (yellow card) 110'; Adeniran (yellow card) 112'; Bello (yellow card) 114'	Stadium: BWT X Upper Austrian Arena; Attendance: 7,336; Referee: Sebastian Gishamer
Note: The match was due to be played on 4 March, but was postponed only 10 minutes before kick-off due to heavy fog.

== Final ==
SCR Altach faced LASK in the final, which was played on 1 May 2026 in Klagenfurt. This was the first time Altach reached the final of the Austrian Cup.

1 May 2026	LASK (I)	4–2 (a.e.t.)	SCR Altach (I)	Klagenfurt
16:00 CEST (UTC+2)	Usor 11'; Adeniran 66', 104'; Bello 101'		Greil 5'; Demaku 29'	Stadium: Wörthersee Stadion; Attendance: 22,000; Referee: Julian Weinberger

== See also ==
- 2025–26 Austrian Football Bundesliga
- 2025–26 Austrian Football Second League
