= 2025–26 SKN St. Pölten season =

SKN St. Pölten
2025–26 season
- Chairman: Helmut Schwarzl
- Manager: (Turkey) Tuğberk Tanrıvermiş
- Stadium: NV Arena
- Austrian Football Second League: 1st
- Austrian Cup: Last 16
colours	colours

This season will be the clubs 25th season in the clubs history. During this season the club will particapte in the following competitions: Austrian Football Second League, Austrian Cup.

== Current squad ==
As of 4 September, 2025

Note: Flags indicate national team as defined under FIFA eligibility rules; some limited exceptions apply. Players may hold more than one non-FIFA nationality.

No.	Pos.	Nation	Player
1	GK	AUT	Christopher Knett
2	DF	GER	Stefan Thesker
5	DF	AUT	Lukas Buchegger
6	DF	AUT	Can Kurt
7	FW	AUT	Winfred Amoah
8	MF	AUT	Christoph Messerer
9	FW	AUT	Bernd Gschweidl
10	MF	GER	Marc Stendera
11	FW	AUT	Marco Hausjell
14	MF	AUT	Dorian-Peter Kasparek
15	DF	NOR	Sondre Skogen
17	FW	AUT	Mateo Zilic

No.	Pos.	Nation	Player
18	DF	AUT	Timo Altersberger
19	DF	AUT	David Riegler
21	MF	AUT	Max Kleinbruckner
22	MF	SEN	El Hadj Mané
23	DF	LUX	Dirk Carlson
24	GK	AUT	Erik Baranyai-Ulvestad
30	FW	NGR	Reinhard Young
32	GK	AUT	Marcel Kurz
33	FW	AUT	Valentin Ferstl
34	MF	AUT	Leomend Krasniqi
77	MF	AUT	Din Barlov

== Pre-season and friendlies ==
5 July 2025 Friendly	SKN St. Pölten (Austria)	1-0	(Austria) FCM Traiskirchen	St. Pölten
11:00	Haris Zahirovic 53'	Report		Stadium: NV Arena

10 July 2025 Friendly	SKN St. Pölten (Austria)	0-2	(Turkey) Beşiktaş	St. Pölten
19:00	Stendera (yellow card) 36'; Leomend Krasniqi (yellow card) 80'	Report	Kılıçsoy 49'; Uçan 53'; Sanuç (yellow card) 71'	Stadium: NV Arena

12 July 2025 Friendly	Grossweikersdorf (Austria)	1-1	(Austria) SKN St. Pölten	Großweikersdorf
18:00	David Aigner 53'	Report	Davud Hodzic 51'

18 July 2025 Friendly	Hitzendorf (Austria)	2-7	(Austria) SKN St. Pölten	Hitzendorf
18:30	Rudolf Pirkner 1'; Mario Rekirsch 81'	Report	David Riegler 6'; Hausjell 12' 22' 44'; Stendera 38'; Din Barlov 55' 61'

== Competitions ==
=== Austrian Football Second League ===
==== League table ====
Pos	Team	Pld	W	D	L	GF	GA	GD	Pts	Promotion or relegation
1	Austria Lustenau (C, P)	28	16	6	6	40	26	+14	54	Promotion to 2026–27 Austrian Football Bundesliga
2	SKN St. Pölten	28	16	5	7	44	26	+18	53	
3	FAC Wien	28	14	6	8	42	18	+24	48	
4	Admira Wacker	28	12	12	4	50	29	+21	48	
5	FC Liefering	28	13	8	7	47	41	+6	47	

Source: 2.Liga Table
Rules for classification: 1) Points; 2) Direct Duel; 3) Goal difference; 4) Goals scored; 5) Matches won; 6) Away matches won; 7) Away goals scored
(C) Champions; (P) Promoted

==== Results summary ====
Overall								Home						Away					
Pld	W	D	L	GF	GA	GD	Pts	W	D	L	GF	GA	GD	W	D	L	GF	GA	GD
22	14	2	6	40	23	+17	44	9	0	2	24	10	+14	5	2	4	16	13	+3

Last updated: 6 April 2026.
Source: ADMIRAL 2. Liga

==== Results by round ====
Round	1	2	3	4	5	6	7	8	9	10	11	12	13	14	15
Ground	A	H	H	A	A	H	A	H	A	H	A	H	A	H	A
Result	W	W	W	D	W	W	W	W	W	W					
Position	5	3	1	1	1	1	1	1	1	1					

Updated to match(es) played on 17 October 2025. Source: ADMIRAL 2. Liga
A = Away; H = Home; W = Win; D = Draw; L = Loss

==== Matches ====
2 August 2025 1	Austria Wien II	1-4	SKN St. Pölten	Vienna
20:00	Ifeanyi Ndukwe (red card) 7'; Hosiner (yellow card) 52' (goal) 61' (pen.)	Report	Stendera 5' 42'; Hausjell 40' 55'	Stadium: Generali Arena; Attendance: 542; Referee: (Austria) Julian Schnur

8 August 2025 2	SKN St. Pölten	4-2	Schwarz-Weiß Bregenz	St. Pölten
18:00	Leomend Krasniqi (yellow card) 37'; Stendera 54' (pen.); Hausjell 59' 69'; Thesker 64'; Can Kurt (yellow card) 89'	Report	Zaizen 51' 81'; Dragan Marceta (yellow card) 53'; Johannes Schriebl (yellow card) 87'	Stadium: NV Arena; Attendance: 1,259; Referee: (Austria) Alain Sadikovski

15 August 2025 3	SKN St. Pölten	2-1	First Vienna FC	St. Pölten
18:00	David Riegler (yellow card) 29'; Winfred Amoah 57'; Stendera (yellow card) 70'; Hausjell 90+6'	Report	David Ungar 23'; Niklas Szerencsi (yellow card) 36'; Rosenberger (yellow card) 84'	Stadium: NV Arena; Attendance: 1,981; Referee: (Austria) Safak Barmaksiz

22 August 2025 4	SKU Amstetten	0-0	SKN St. Pölten	Amstetten
18:00	Steiger (yellow card) 28'; Peham (yellow card) 61'; Matthias Gragger (yellow card) 90'	Report	Leomend Krasniqi (yellow card) 74'; Din Barlov (yellow card) 90+5'	Stadium: Ertl-Glas-Stadion; Attendance: 1,300; Referee: (Austria) Markus Hameter

30 August 2025 5	Rapid Wien II	0-2	SKN St. Pölten	Vienna
14:30	Velimirovic (yellow card) 8'; Lorenz Szladits (yellow card) 51' (yellow-red card) 69'	Report	Dursun (yellow card) 35' (goal) 62'; Skogen (yellow card) 53'; Stendera 60'	Stadium: Allianz Stadion; Attendance: 310; Referee: (Austria) Jakob Semler

12 September 2025 6	SKN St. Pölten	3-1	SV Stripfing	St. Pölten
18:00	Hausjell 2'; Stendera 37' (pen.); Reinhard Young 45+2'; Thesker (yellow card) 60'; Skogen (yellow card) 74'; Knett (yellow card) 89'	Report	Simon Furtlehner (yellow card) 10'; Etienne (yellow card) 27'; Koblar (yellow card) 54' (yellow-red card) 80'; Jurica Poldrugač 78' (pen.)	Stadium: NV Arena; Attendance: 1,280; Referee: (Austria) Julian Weinberger

20 September 2025 7	Austria Salzburg	1-2	SKN St. Pölten	Salzburg
14:30	Denis Kahrimanović (yellow card) 16' (yellow-red card) 75'; Sebastian Aigner (yellow card) 25'; Gebauer 57'	Report	David Riegler (yellow card) 55'; Leomend Krasniqi (yellow card) 82'; Hausjell 88'; Thesker (yellow card) 90+1'; Reinhard Young 90+5'	Stadium: Max Aicher Stadion; Attendance: 1,700; Referee: (Austria) Alain Sadikovski

26 September 2025 8	SKN St. Pölten	4-0	Sturm Graz II	St. Pölten
18:00	Stendera 39' (pen.); Winfred Amoah (yellow card) 65' (goal) 67'; Hausjell (yellow card) 72'; Dursun 76'; Valentin Ferstl 86'; David Riegler (yellow card) 90+2'	Report	Tizian-Valentino Scharmer (yellow card) 69'	Stadium: NV Arena; Attendance: 1,792; Referee: (Austria) Manuel Baumann

5 October 2025 9	Austria Klagenfurt	1-2	SKN St. Pölten	Klagenfurt
10:30	Elias Jandrisevits (yellow card) 19'; Jaritz (yellow card) 23'; Schmerböck 28' (pen.); Barišić (yellow card) 70'; Mario Matković (yellow card) 90'	Report	Timo Altersberger (yellow card) 27' (goal) 87'; Dursun 63'	Stadium: Wörthersee Stadion; Attendance: 1,400; Referee: (Austria) Alexander Harkam

17 October 2025 10	SKN St. Pölten	1-0	Austria Lustenau	St. Pölten
20:30	Winfred Amoah (yellow card) 9' (goal) 90+6'; El Hadj Mané (yellow card) 47'; Lukas Buchegger (yellow card) 63'	Report	William Rodrigues (red card) 54'; Seydou Diarra (yellow card) 59'; Schierl (yellow card) 69'	Stadium: NV Arena; Attendance: 2,300; Referee: (Austria) Achim Untergasser

24 October 2025 11	FC Liefering	3-1	SKN St. Pölten	Salzburg
18:00	Jakob Brandtner (yellow card) 14' (goal) 63'; Striednig (yellow card) 23'; Zikovic 48'; Lukić 71'; Julian Hussauf (yellow card) 82'; Zabransky (yellow card) 90'	Report	Hausjell 50'; Leomend Krasniqi (yellow card) 67'; El Hadj Mané (yellow card) 90+1'	Stadium: Red Bull Arena; Attendance: 185; Referee: (Austria) Stefan Macanovic

1 November 2025 12	SKN St. Pölten	0-2	FAC Wien	St. Pölten
14:30	Carlson (yellow card) 51'; David Riegler (yellow card) 58'; Cem Sekerlioglu (yellow card) 90'	Report	Maier 22'; Evan Eghosa Aisowieren 39'; Noah Bitsche (yellow card) 51'; Becirovic (yellow card) 51'; Simon Filipovic (yellow card) 83'	Stadium: NV Arena; Attendance: 1,500; Referee: (Austria) Stjepan Bosnjak

=== Austrian Cup ===
25 July 2025 Round 1	SC Kalsdorf	0-5	SKN St. Pölten	Kalsdorf bei Graz
19:00		Report	Winfred Amoah 21'; Hausjell 26'; Din Barlov 53' 69'; Stendera 60'; Leomend Krasniqi (yellow card) 68'	Stadium: Sportzentrum Kalsdorf; Attendance: 450; Referee: (Austria) Marco Schlacher

26 August 2025 Round 2	FC Hertha Wels	2-2 (4-5 p)	SKN St. Pölten	Wels
19:00	Michael Brugger 3'; Feyrer (yellow card) 50'; Gashi (yellow card) 75'; Bošnjak (yellow card) 82'; Andreas Radics 87'	Report	Timo Altersberger (yellow card) 35'; Thesker 45'; Dursun (yellow card) 50'; Leomend Krasniqi 82' (yellow card) 91'; Stendera (yellow card) 85'; Knett (yellow card) 87'	Stadium: HUBER Arena Wels; Attendance: 1,300; Referee: (Austria) Philip Gadler
