= 2026–27 Wolfsberger AC season =

Wolfsberger AC
2026–27 season
- Manager: Thomas Silberberger
- Stadium: Lavanttal-Arena
- Austrian Football Bundesliga: 11th
- Austrian Cup: Third round
- Top goalscorer: League: Giacomo Vrioni (4); All: Giacomo Vrioni (6)
- Highest home attendance: 5,335 (vs. Rapid Wien, 12 September 2026)
- Lowest home attendance: 4,625 (vs. Austria Wien, 2 August 2026)
- Average home league attendance: 4,936
- Biggest win: 5–1 (vs. FC Lauterach, 24 July 2026)
- Biggest defeat: 3–0 (vs. Rapid Wien, 12 September 2026); 4–1 (vs. SV Ried, 20 September 2026)
- All statistics correct as of 20 September 2026.

The 2026–27 season is the 96th season in the history of Wolfsberger AC, and the club's 15th consecutive season in the Austrian Football Bundesliga. In addition to the domestic league, the team is scheduled to participate in the Austrian Cup.

== Transfers ==
=== In ===
| Pos. | Player | Transferred from | Fee | Date | Source |
|---|---|---|---|---|---|
| MF | (Austria) Thorsten Schriebl | (Austria) Grazer AK | Free | 29 May 2026 | |
| DF | (Austria) Raffael Behounek | (Netherlands) Willem II | Free | 2 June 2026 | |
| FW | (Albania) Giacomo Vrioni | (Italy) Cesena | Free | 10 June 2026 | |
| MF | (Austria) Marco Schabauer | (Austria) Admira Wacker | Undisclosed | 13 June 2026 | |
| DF | (Austria) Matteo Kitz | Austria Klagenfurt | €75,000 | 17 June 2026 | |
| FW | (Austria) Luca Hassler | (Austria) SV Kapfenberg | Free | 17 June 2026 | |
| MF | (Georgia (country)) Otar Mamageishvili | (Portugal) Famalicão | Loan | 17 June 2026 | |
| FW | (Serbia) Veljko Vukojević | (Serbia) Grafičar Belgrade | Undisclosed | 19 June 2026 | |
| DF | (Austria) Aaron Sky Schwarz | (Austria) Admira Wacker | Undisclosed | 1 July 2026 | |
| FW | (Austria) Phillip Verhounig | (Austria) FC Liefering | Undisclosed | 28 July 2026 | |
| GK | (Israel) Lior Gliklich | (Israel) Maccabi Bnei Reineh | €125,000 | 24 August 2026 | |
| MF | (Austria) Dominik Fitz | (United States) Minnesota United | Loan | 27 August 2026 | |

=== Out ===
| Pos. | Player | Transferred to | Fee | Date | Source |
|---|---|---|---|---|---|
| MF | (Austria) Alessandro Schöpf | (Austria) LASK | Free | 20 May 2026 | |
| DF | (Austria) Dominik Baumgartner | (Poland) Cracovia | Free | 15 June 2026 | |
| DF | (Austria) Tobias Gruber | (Austria) First Vienna | Undisclosed | 17 June 2026 | |
| FW | (Austria) Erik Kojzek | (Serbia) Partizan Belgrade | Loan: €500,000 fee | 18 June 2026 | |
| MF | (Serbia) Dejan Zukić | (Serbia) Vojvodina | €2,500,000 | 20 June 2026 | |
| FW | (Ghana) David Atanga | | Released | 1 July 2026 | |
| MF | (Austria) Florent Hajdini | (Austria) SKU Amstetten | Free | 2 July 2026 | |
| FW | (Austria) Thierno Ballo | (France) Saint-Étienne | €2,650,000 | 11 July 2026 | |
| FW | (Kenya) Ryan Ogam | (Belgium) RFC Liège | Loan | 11 July 2026 | |
| FW | (Austria) Angelo Gattermayer | (Austria) TSV Hartberg | Free | 21 July 2026 | |
| GK | (Austria) Nikolas Polster | (Netherlands) NEC Nijmegen | €1,150,000 | 12 August 2026 | |
| MF | (Nigeria) Tochukwu Raymond | (Croatia) BSK Bijelo Brdo | Undisclosed | 17 August 2026 | |

== Friendlies ==
| 20 June 2026 Friendly | WSG Radenthein (Austria) | 0–18 | (Austria) Wolfsberger AC | Radenthein |
| 15:30 | | Report | Pink 1', 16', 34'; Schabauer 9'; Karamoko 13', 23'; Sulzner 17'; Schriebl 40'; 50' (o.g.); Vrioni 55', 65', 73'; Mamageishvili 58', 70', 76'; Hassler 61'; Agyemang 77'; Wohlmuth 82' |

| 27 June 2026 Friendly | Wolfsberger AC (Austria) | 2–0 | (Hungary) Nyíregyháza Spartacus | Ligist |
| 17:30 | Pink 4'; Karamoko 63' | Report |

| 30 June 2026 Friendly | Wolfsberger AC (Austria) | 2–0 | (Serbia) Železničar Pančevo | Lavamünd |
| 17:30 | Pink 30' (pen.); Hassler 80' | Report |

| 3 July 2026 Friendly | Wolfsberger AC (Austria) | 8–2 | (Austria) Admira Wacker | Sankt Veit an der Glan |
| 18:00 | Avdijaj 8', 18', 19'; Vrioni 24', 35'; Sulzner 61'; Wimmer 65'; Karamoko 84' | Report | Forst 4'; Wagner 9' |

| 10 July 2026 Friendly | Wolfsberger AC (Austria) | 3–3 | (Ukraine) FC Kharkiv | Maria Alm |
| 10:30 | Sulzner 22'; Vrioni 36' (pen.); Karamoko 83' | Report | Baptistella 5'; Castillo 21'; Zabergja 66' |

| 10 July 2026 Friendly | Wolfsberger AC (Austria) | Cancelled | (Turkey) İstanbul Başakşehir |
| 15:00 | | Report |

| 13 July 2026 Friendly | Hradec Králové (Czech Republic) | 1–1 | (Austria) Wolfsberger AC | Maria Alm |
| 17:00 | Trubač 10' | Report | Schriebl 53' |

| 17 July 2026 Friendly | Wolfsberger AC (Austria) | 6–1 | (Austria) SV Kapfenberg | Wolfsberg |
| 18:00 | Vrioni 6', 45'; Schwarz 20'; Avdijaj 54'; Karamoko 64'; Pink 78' | Report | Zlibanovic 66' | Stadium: Lavanttal-Arena |

| 20 July 2026 Friendly | ATUS Velden (Austria) | 0–4 | (Austria) Wolfsberger AC | Velden am Wörther See |
| 18:00 | | Report | Vrioni 10'; Wohlmuth 24'; Karamoko 49'; Vukojević 56' |

== Competitions ==
=== Overall record ===
| Competition | First match | Last match | Starting round | Record | | | | | | | |
| Competition | First match | Last match | Starting round | Pld | W | D | L | GF | GA | GD | Win % |
|---|---|---|---|---|---|---|---|---|---|---|---|
| Austrian Football Bundesliga | 2 August 2026 | | Matchday 1 | 7 | 1 | 2 | 4 | 7 | 13 | −6 | 14.29 |
| Austrian Cup | 24 July 2026 | | First round | 2 | 1 | 1 | 0 | 7 | 3 | +4 | 50.00 |
| Total | | | | 9 | 2 | 3 | 4 | 14 | 16 | −2 | 22.22 |

Last updated: 20 September 2026
Source: Soccerway

=== Austrian Football Bundesliga ===
==== League table ====
| Pos | Team | Pld | W | D | L | GF | GA | GD | Pts | Qualification |
|---|---|---|---|---|---|---|---|---|---|---|
| 8 | Austria Lustenau | 12 | 3 | 2 | 7 | 15 | 30 | −15 | 11 | Qualification for the Relegation round |
| 9 | Grazer AK | 12 | 2 | 4 | 6 | 9 | 29 | −20 | 10 | Qualification for the Relegation round |
| 10 | SCR Altach | 12 | 3 | 1 | 8 | 11 | 20 | −9 | 10 | Qualification for the Relegation round |
| 11 | Austria Wien | 12 | 2 | 2 | 8 | 11 | 23 | −12 | 8 | Qualification for the Relegation round |
| 12 | Wolfsberger | 12 | 1 | 3 | 8 | 8 | 26 | −18 | 6 | Qualification for the Relegation round |

Updated to match(es) played on 8 November 2026. Source: Austrian Football Bundesliga
Rules for classification: 1) Points; 2) Head-to-head record; 3) Goal difference; 4) Goals scored; 5) Matches won; 6) Away matches won; 7) Away goals scored.

==== Results summary ====
| Overall | | | | | | | | Home | | | | | | Away | | | | | |
| Pld | W | D | L | GF | GA | GD | Pts | W | D | L | GF | GA | GD | W | D | L | GF | GA | GD |
|---|---|---|---|---|---|---|---|---|---|---|---|---|---|---|---|---|---|---|---|
| 7 | 1 | 2 | 4 | 7 | 13 | −6 | 5 | 1 | 1 | 2 | 5 | 7 | −2 | 0 | 1 | 2 | 2 | 6 | −4 |

Last updated: 20 September 2026.
Source: ADMIRAL Bundesliga

==== Results by round ====
| Round | 1 | 2 | 3 | 4 | 5 | 6 | 7 |
|---|---|---|---|---|---|---|---|
| Ground | H | H | A | H | A | H | A |
| Result | W | D | L | L | D | L | L |
| Position | 2 | 3 | 6 | 8 | 7 | 11 | 11 |

Updated to match(es) played on 20 September 2026. Source: ADMIRAL Bundesliga
A = Away; H = Home; W = Win; D = Draw; L = Loss

==== Matches ====
| 2 August 2026 1 | Wolfsberger AC | 3–0 | Austria Wien | Wolfsberg |
| 17:00 | Vrioni 18' (pen.), 63' (pen.); Wimmer (yellow card) 31'; Schwarz 49'; Polster (yellow card) 89' | Report | Nnodim (yellow card) 85' | Stadium: Lavanttal-Arena; Attendance: 4,625; Referee: Alexander Harkam |

| 9 August 2026 2 | Wolfsberger AC | 1–1 | Red Bull Salzburg | Wolfsberg |
| 17:00 | Diabaté (yellow card) 52'; Vrioni 67'; Sulzner (yellow card) 69'; Schriebl (yellow card) 78'; Mamageishvili (yellow card) 90+6'; Renner (yellow card) 90+7' | Report | Camara (yellow card) 7'; Vertessen 79' | Stadium: Lavanttal-Arena; Attendance: 5,032; Referee: Isa Simsek |

| 15 August 2026 3 | Austria Lustenau | 2–1 | Wolfsberger AC | Lustenau |
| 17:00 | Verinac 23', 32'; Jastremski (yellow card) 83'; Gmeiner (yellow card) 90+3' | Report | Schabauer (yellow card) 40'; Vrioni 45+4' | Stadium: Reichshofstadion; Attendance: 3,907; Referee: Jakob Semler |

| 29 August 2026 5 | Grazer AK | 0–0 | Wolfsberger AC | Graz |
| 17:00 | Michorl (yellow card) 27'; Pines (yellow card) 48'; Maderner (yellow card) 61' | Report | Wimmer (red card) 15'; Behounek (yellow card) 27'; Sulzner (yellow card) 61'; Wohlmuth (yellow card) 74' | Stadium: Liebenauer Stadium; Attendance: 6,744; Referee: Markus Greinecker |

| 1 September 2026 4 | Wolfsberger AC | 1–3 | LASK | Wolfsberg |
| 19:30 | Behounek (red card) 2'; Wohlmuth 34'; Mamageishvili (yellow card) 70' | Report | Dibango (yellow card) 33'; Usor (yellow card) 44'; Mbuyamba 54', (yellow card) 66'; Bogarde 68'; Schöpf 84' | Stadium: Lavanttal-Arena; Attendance: 4,731; Referee: Christian-Petru Ciochirca |

| 12 September 2026 6 | Wolfsberger AC | 0–3 | Rapid Wien | Wolfsberg |
| 19:30 | Verhounig (yellow card) 66'; Fitz (yellow card) 77' | Report | Raux-Yao 13', (yellow card) 71'; Cvetković 35'; Dahl (yellow card) 43', (goal) 82'; Bajlicz (yellow card) 51'; Bolla (yellow card) 73' | Stadium: Lavanttal-Arena; Attendance: 5,355; Referee: Alain Sadikovski |

| 20 September 2026 7 | SV Ried | 4–1 | Wolfsberger AC | Ried im Innkreis |
| 14:30 | Bajic 3'; Aisowieren 9'; Schwab 40' (pen.), (yellow card) 42'; Steurer (yellow card) 75'; Thelin 81', (yellow card) 85' | Report | Gütlbauer (yellow card) 38'; Fitz (yellow card) 45'; Kitz (yellow card) 56', (goal) 87'; Piesinger (yellow card) 58' | Stadium: BWT X Upper Austrian Arena; Attendance: 3,864; Referee: Alexander Harkam |

=== Austrian Cup ===
| 24 July 2026 First round | FC Lauterach | 1–5 | Wolfsberger AC | Lauterach |
| 19:00 | Grabic 56'; Yachir (yellow card) 78' | Report | Vrioni 27', 81'; Schabauer 32', 38'; Diabaté (yellow card) 47'; Karamoko 75' | Stadium: Bruno Pezzey Stadion; Attendance: 800; Referee: David Astl |

| 6 September 2026 Second round | SC/ESV Parndorf | 2–2 (a.e.t.) (4–5 p) | Wolfsberger AC | Parndorf |
| 17:00 | Szabo (yellow card) 50', (goal) 90+1'; Bucur (yellow card) 90+3'; Fofana (yellow card) 94'; Lamster (yellow card) 101'; Ziniel 107', (yellow card) 120'; Schmelzer (yellow card) 110' | Report | Schriebl (yellow card) 33'; Mamageishvili (yellow card) 68' (yellow-red card) 92'; Pink 79'; Hassler 96' | Stadium: Heidebodenstadion; Attendance: 1,000; Referee: Manuel Baumann |
| | Penalties |
| | Bucur (penalty missed); Szabo (penalty scored); Rigo (penalty scored); Dornhackl (penalty scored); Schmelzer (penalty scored); Schmidt (penalty missed) | | Wohlmuth (penalty missed); Sulzner (penalty scored); Hassler (penalty scored); Schwarz (penalty scored); Verhounig (penalty scored); Schabauer (penalty scored) |

| 27 October 2026 Third round | FC Hertha Wels | v | Wolfsberger AC | Wels |
| 17:00 | | Report | | Stadium: EWW Stadion |

== Statistics ==
=== Appearances and goals ===
As of match played 20 September 2026

Players with no appearances are not included on the list
Italics indicate a loaned in player

| No. | Pos | Nat | Player | Total | | Bundesliga | | Austrian Cup | |
| No. | Pos | Nat | Player | Apps | Goals | Apps | Goals | Apps | Goals |
|---|---|---|---|---|---|---|---|---|---|
| 1 | GK | (Austria) AUT | Lukas Gütlbauer | 6 | 0 | 5+0 | 0 | 1+0 | 0 |
| 6 | DF | (Austria) AUT | Raffael Behounek | 7 | 0 | 6+0 | 0 | 1+0 | 0 |
| 7 | FW | (Austria) AUT | Luca Hassler | 4 | 1 | 0+3 | 0 | 0+1 | 1 |
| 8 | DF | (Austria) AUT | Simon Piesinger | 4 | 0 | 4+0 | 0 | 0+0 | 0 |
| 9 | FW | (Albania) ALB | Giacomo Vrioni | 7 | 6 | 5+0 | 4 | 2+0 | 2 |
| 10 | MF | (Kosovo) KOS | Donis Avdijaj | 9 | 0 | 5+2 | 0 | 2+0 | 0 |
| 11 | MF | (Austria) AUT | Aaron Sky Schwarz | 8 | 1 | 5+1 | 1 | 1+1 | 0 |
| 12 | GK | (Austria) AUT | Lior Gliklich | 1 | 0 | 0+0 | 0 | 1+0 | 0 |
| 15 | DF | (Ivory Coast) CIV | Cheick Mamadou Diabaté | 4 | 0 | 3+0 | 0 | 1+0 | 0 |
| 17 | MF | (Austria) AUT | Marco Schabauer | 7 | 2 | 4+1 | 0 | 1+1 | 2 |
| 19 | MF | (Georgia (country)) GEO | Otar Mamageishvili | 8 | 0 | 5+2 | 0 | 1+0 | 0 |
| 20 | MF | (Austria) AUT | Thorsten Schriebl | 7 | 0 | 0+5 | 0 | 1+1 | 0 |
| 22 | FW | (Serbia) SRB | Veljko Vukojević | 1 | 0 | 0+0 | 0 | 0+1 | 0 |
| 23 | FW | (Austria) AUT | Phillip Verhounig | 7 | 0 | 3+3 | 0 | 0+1 | 0 |
| 30 | MF | (Austria) AUT | Marco Sulzner | 9 | 0 | 7+0 | 0 | 2+0 | 0 |
| 31 | DF | (Austria) AUT | Fabian Wohlmuth | 9 | 1 | 7+0 | 1 | 2+0 | 0 |
| 32 | FW | (Austria) AUT | Markus Pink | 6 | 1 | 1+4 | 0 | 0+1 | 1 |
| 34 | MF | (Ghana) GHA | Emmanuel Agyemang | 7 | 0 | 3+2 | 0 | 1+1 | 0 |
| 35 | DF | (Austria) AUT | Matteo Kitz | 7 | 1 | 3+2 | 1 | 1+1 | 0 |
| 36 | MF | (Austria) AUT | Dominik Fitz | 4 | 0 | 2+1 | 0 | 1+0 | 0 |
| 37 | DF | (Austria) AUT | Nicolas Wimmer | 6 | 0 | 4+0 | 0 | 2+0 | 0 |
| 49 | FW | (Ivory Coast) CIV | Sankara Karamoko | 6 | 1 | 0+5 | 0 | 0+1 | 1 |
| 77 | DF | (Austria) AUT | Rene Renner | 9 | 0 | 3+4 | 0 | 1+1 | 0 |
Player(s) who featured but departed the club permanently during the season:
| 12 | GK | (Austria) AUT | Nikolas Polster | 2 | 0 | 2+0 | 0 | 0+0 | 0 |
