= Daniel Scharner =

Austrian footballer

Personal information
- Date of birth: 26 February 1997 (age 29)
- Place of birth: Purgstall, Austria
- Height: 1.86 m (6 ft 1 in)
- Position: Midfielder

Team information
- Current team: SKU Amstetten
- Number: 14

Youth career
- 2004–2011: SVg Purgstall
- 2011–2013: SG Waidhofen/Ybbs

Senior career*
Years	Team	Apps	(Gls)
2013–2015	SV Gaflenz	37	(7)
2015–2021	SKU Amstetten	117	(9)
2021–2023	Wiener SC	30	(1)
2023–2024	Young Violets	16	(0)
2024–	SKU Amstetten	14	(1)
- * Club domestic league appearances and goals as of 12 June 2025

Daniel Scharner (born 26 February 1997) is an Austrian professional footballer who plays as a midfielder for SKU Amstetten.
