= Tiago Estevao =

German footballer (born 2002)

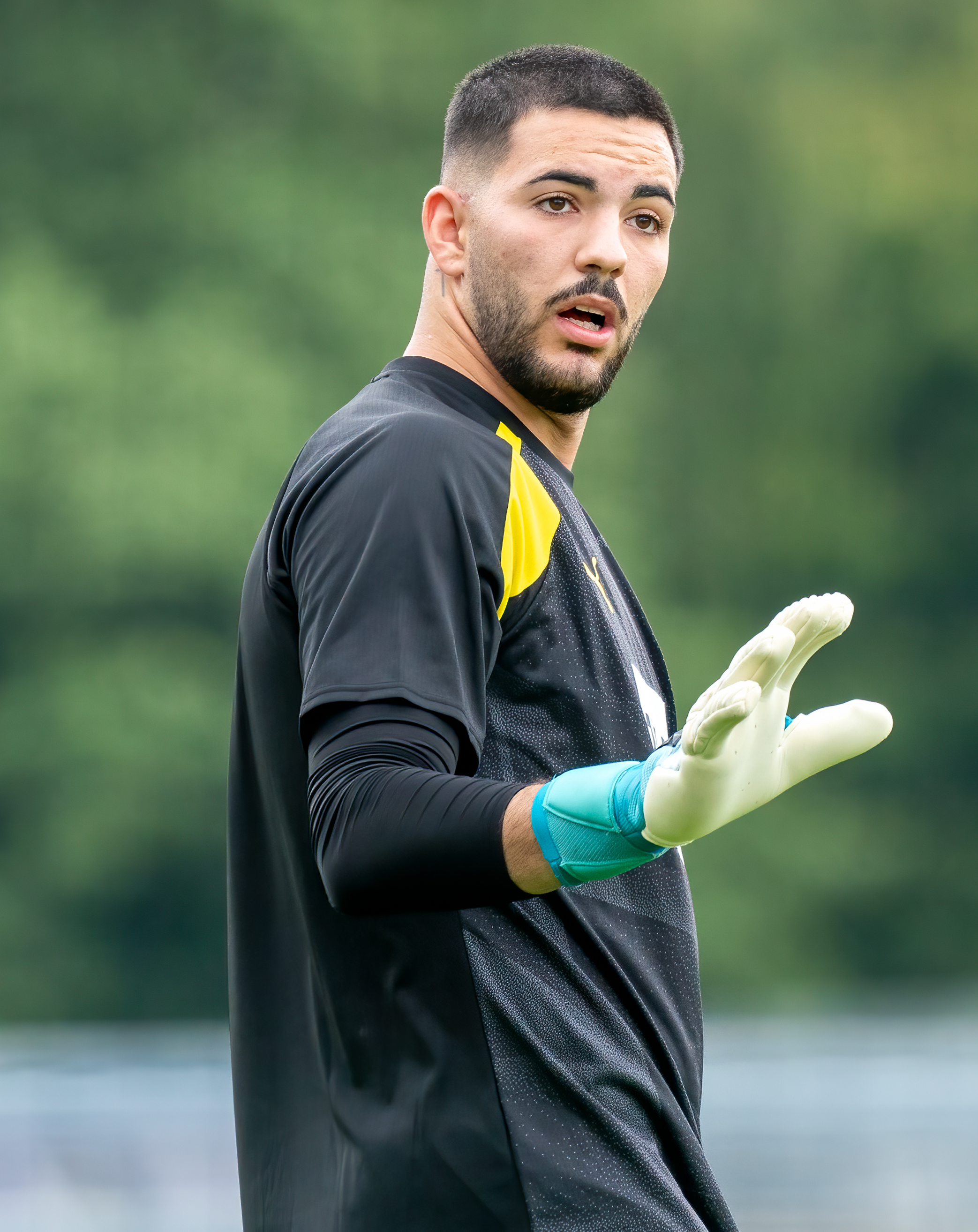
- Estevao with Borussia Dortmund II in 2023

Personal information
- Date of birth: 13 May 2002 (age 24)
- Place of birth: Heinsberg, Germany
- Height: 1.93 m (6 ft 4 in)
- Position: Goalkeeper

Team information
- Current team: SKU Amstetten
- Number: 1

Youth career
- –2018: Borussia Mönchengladbach
- 2018–2020: Porto
- 2020–2021: Bayer Leverkusen

Senior career*
Years	Team	Apps	(Gls)
2021–2022	FC Wegberg-Beeck	10	(0)
2022–2023	SV Rödinghausen	16	(0)
2023–2025	Borussia Dortmund II	2	(0)
2025–	SKU Amstetten	26	(0)
- * Club domestic league appearances and goals as of 17 May 2026

Tiago Estevao (Portuguese: Estêvão; born 13 May 2002) is a German professional footballer who plays as a goalkeeper for SKU Amstetten.

== Early life ==
Estevao is a native of Heinsberg, Germany. He is of Portuguese descent. As a youth player, he joined the youth academy of Portuguese side FC Porto, where he trained with Spain international Iker Casillas.

== Career ==
In 2021, Estevao signed for German side FC Wegberg-Beeck. He was described as "indicated in preparation that he was a force to be reckoned with... then demonstrated this emphatically in the championship". On 4 September 2021, he debuted for the club during a 2–0 loss to Schalke 04 II. In 2022, he signed for German side SV Rödinghausen. He suffered a knee injury while playing for the club. On 5 August 2022, he debuted for the club during a 2–0 win over Fortuna Köln. In 2023, he signed for German side Borussia Dortmund II. On 11 November 2023, he debuted for the club during a 1–1 draw with VfB Lübeck.

== Style of play ==
Estevao started playing football as a striker before switching to goalkeeper.

== Personal life ==
Estevao has three brothers.
