= Furkan Dursun =

Austrian footballer (born 2002)

Personal information
- Date of birth: 14 March 2005 (age 21)
- Place of birth: Vienna, Austria
- Height: 1.90 m (6 ft 3 in)
- Position: Striker

Team information
- Current team: Thun
- Number: 9

Youth career
- 2010–2011: ISS Admira
- 2011–2012: 1210 Wien
- 2012–2014: First Vienna
- 2014–2022: Rapid Wien

Senior career*
Years	Team	Apps	(Gls)
2022–2025	Rapid Wien II	52	(11)
2024–2026	Rapid Wien	8	(0)
2025–2026	→ SKN St. Pölten (loan)	16	(3)
2026–	Thun	19	(3)

International career^{‡}
2021–2022	Austria U17	8	(0)
2022–2023	Austria U18	10	(3)
2023–2024	Austria U19	7	(1)
2025–	Austria U21	10	(1)
- * Club domestic league appearances and goals as of 10 October 2026 ‡ National team caps and goals as of 19:31, 6 October 2026 (UTC)

Furkan Dursun (born 14 March 2005) is an Austrian professional football player who plays as a striker for Swiss Super League club Thun.

== Club career ==
Dursun is a product of the youth academies of the Austrian clubs ISS Admira, 1210 Wien, First Vienna and Rapid Wien. On 12 January 2022, he signed his first professional contract with Rapid until 2022 and was promoted to Rapid's reserves in the 2. Liga. On 1 March 2024, he extended his contract with Rapid Wien until 2027. On 10 March 2024, he made his professional debut with the senior Rapid team in a 1–1 Austrian Football Bundesliga tie with Austria Klagenfurt. On 1 August 2025, Dursun was loaned to SKN St. Pölten in the 2. Liga for one season. His loan was cut short on 1 February 2026.

On 10 February 2026, Dursun transferred to Swiss Super League club Thun on a contract until 2029. He helped Thun win their first ever first division title, the 2025–26 Swiss Super League.

== International career ==
Born in Austria, Dursun is of Turkish descent and holds dual Austrian and Turkish citizenship. He was called up to the Austria U21s for a set of friendly matches in June 2025.

== Career statistics ==
As of match played 15 October 2026

Appearances and goals by club, season and competition
Club	Season	League			Cup		Europe		Other		Total	
Club	Season	Division	Apps	Goals	Apps	Goals	Apps	Goals	Apps	Goals	Apps	Goals
Rapid Wien II	2022–23	2. Liga	14	2	—		—		—		14	2
Rapid Wien II	2023–24	Austrian Regionalliga East	16	5	—		—		—		16	5
Rapid Wien II	2024–25	2. Liga	22	4	—		—		—		22	4
Rapid Wien II	Total		52	11	—		—		—		52	11
Rapid Wien	2023–24	Austrian Bundesliga	5	0	1	0	—		—		6	0
Rapid Wien	2024–25	Austrian Bundesliga	3	0	2	0	5 (Note: Appearances in UEFA Europa League)	0	—		10	0
Rapid Wien	Total		8	0	3	0	5	0	—		16	0
SKN St. Pölten (loan)	2025–26	2. Liga	16	3	2	0	—		—		18	3
Thun	2025–26	Swiss Super League	12	1	—		—		—		12	1
Thun	2026–27	Swiss Super League	7	2	1	3	5 (Note: Two appearances in UEFA Champions League, three appearances and one goal in UEFA Europa League)	1	—		13	6
Thun	Total		19	3	1	3	5	1	—		25	7
Career total			95	17	6	3	10	1	0	0	111	21

== Honours ==
Rapid Wien II

- Austrian Regionalliga East: 2023–24

Thun

- Swiss Super League: 2025–26
