= Joshua Steiger =

Austrian footballer

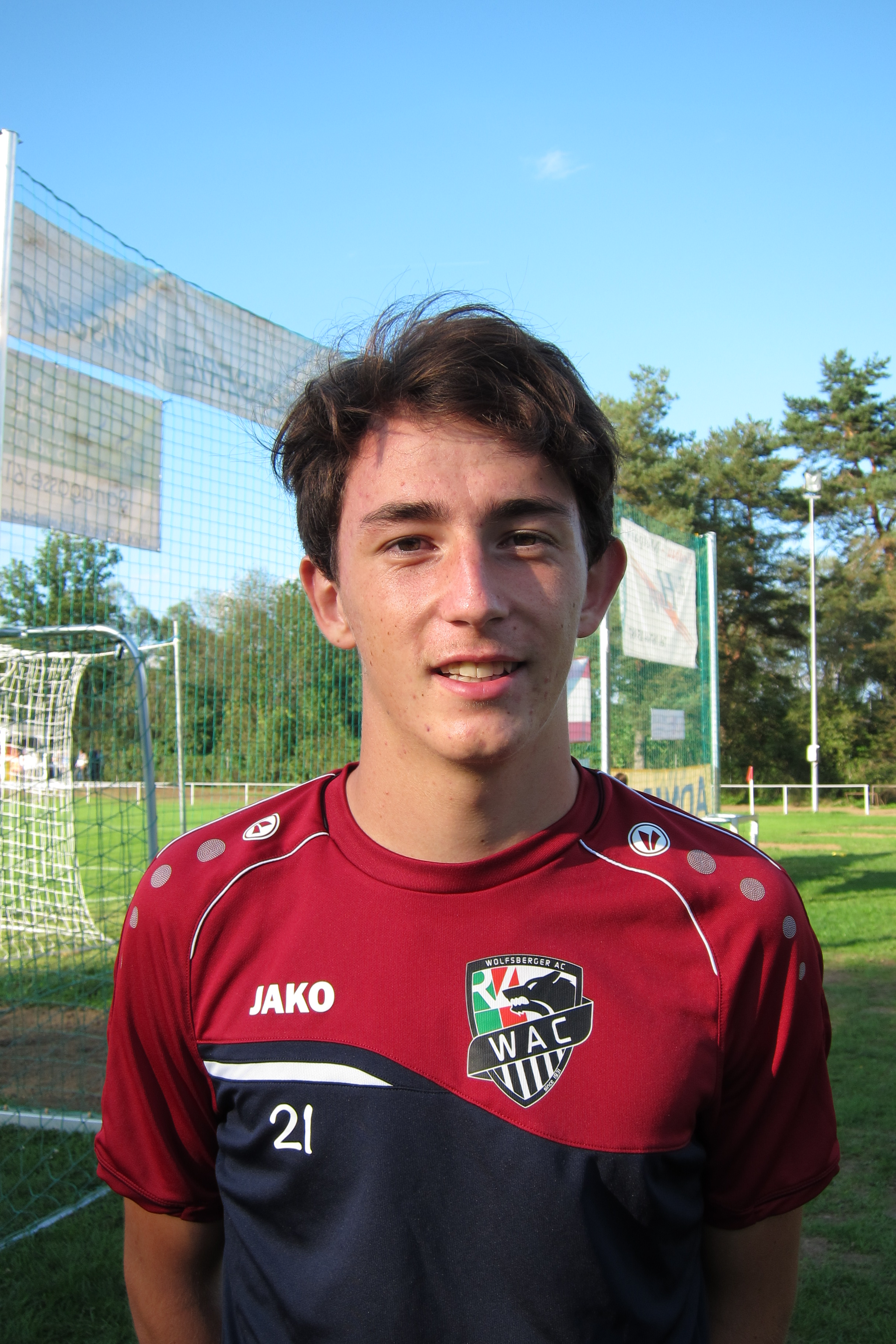

Personal information
- Full name: Joshua Janos Gregor Steiger
- Date of birth: 6 April 2001 (age 25)
- Height: 1.85 m (6 ft 1 in)
- Position: Midfielder

Team information
- Current team: SKU Amstetten
- Number: 10

Youth career
- 2007–2011: TSU Virgen
- 2011–2012: TSU Matrei
- 2012–2015: TSU Virgen
- 2015–2018: Wolfsberger AC

Senior career*
Years	Team	Apps	(Gls)
2017–2021	Wolfsberger AC	8	(0)
2020–2021	→ SV Lafnitz (loan)	7	(0)
2017–2023	Wolfsberger II	95	(25)
2023–2025	Stripfing	44	(2)
2025–	SKU Amstetten	27	(4)

International career^{‡}
2016–2017	Austria U16	9	(2)
2017–2018	Austria U17	13	(2)
2018–2019	Austria U18	5	(1)
2019–2020	Austria U19	10	(1)
- * Club domestic league appearances and goals as of 17 May 2026 ‡ National team caps and goals as of 4 September 2020

Joshua Janos Gregor Steiger (born 6 April 2001) is an Austrian football player. He plays for SKU Amstetten.

== Club career ==
He made his Austrian Football Bundesliga debut for Wolfsberger AC on 19 August 2017 in a game against FC Admira Wacker Mödling.
