= Philipp Offenthaler =

Austrian footballer

Personal information
- Date of birth: 3 March 1997 (age 29)
- Place of birth: Amstetten, Austria
- Position: Midfielder

Team information
- Current team: SKU Amstetten
- Number: 15

Youth career
- 2006–2011: TSV Grein
- 2011–2012: AKA St. Pölten
- 2012: TSV Grein
- 2012–2014: SG Waidhofen/Ybbs

Senior career*
Years	Team	Apps	(Gls)
2014–2016	SCU Ardagger	38	(4)
2016–2017	SV Wacker Burghausen	11	(0)
2017–2018	SKN St. Pölten II	30	(2)
2019–	SKU Amstetten	169	(6)
- * Club domestic league appearances and goals as of 17 May 2026

Philipp Offenthaler (born 03 March 1997) is an Austrian professional footballer who plays as a midfielder for Austrian Football Second League club SKU Amstetten.

== Career ==
=== Early career ===
Offenthaler began his career at TSV Grein in Austria, joining AKA St. Pölten from 2011 to 2012, before returning to Grein. Later in 2012 he moved to SG Waidhofen.

=== SCU Ardagger ===
At the start of the 2014–15 he moved to SCU Ardagger, debuting in April 2015; while at SCU Ardagger he was nominated and then named the 2016 Austrian amateur player of the year.

=== SV Wacker Burghausen ===
For the 2016–17 season, Offenthaler moved to SV Wacker Burghausen who play in the Regionalliga Bayern in Germany; he made his debut playing against TSV 1860 Munich II.

=== SKN St. Pölten II ===
He returned to Austria for 2017–18, playing for SKN St. Pölten II.

=== SKU Amstetten ===
In the 2018–19 season he joined SKU Amstetten where his coach in an interview stated that Offenthaler only lived fifteen kilometres from the club, which mostly featured local players. During his first season, he played seven times for the club at league, with his first start on 5 August 2018, against FC Wacker Innsbruck.

On 26 October 2020, Offenthaler scored his first goal for the club in a 3–3 draw against FC Juniors OÖ after an assist by Daniel Scharner.
