= Andreas Pfingstner =

Austrian footballer (born 1993)

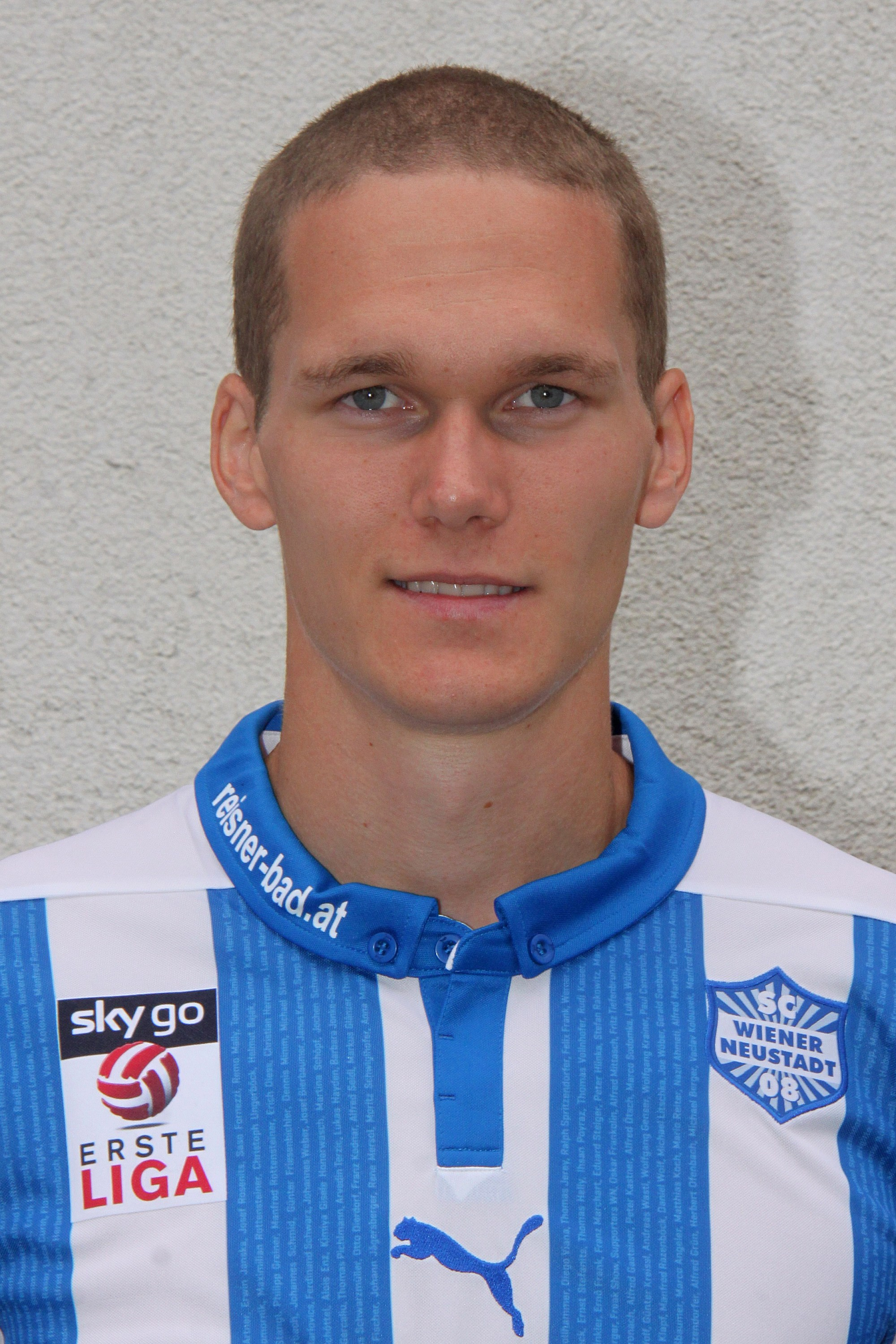

Personal information
- Date of birth: 24 March 1993 (age 33)
- Place of birth: Judenburg, Austria
- Height: 1.93 m (6 ft 4 in)
- Position: Centre-back

Team information
- Current team: ASK Voitsberg
- Number: 13

Youth career
- 1998–2007: WSV St. Lambrecht
- 2007–2010: Red Bull Salzburg
- 2010–2012: Hansa Rostock

Senior career*
Years	Team	Apps	(Gls)
2012–2013	Hansa Rostock II	21	(1)
2012–2016	SK Sturm Graz II	20	(1)
2014–2016	SK Sturm Graz	4	(0)
2015–2016	→ SC Wiener Neustadt (loan)	25	(1)
2016–2017	SC Wiener Neustadt	25	(0)
2017–2018	SV Allerheiligen	28	(2)
2018–2019	SC Kalsdorf	18	(1)
2019–	ASK Voitsberg	140	(1)

International career
2009	Austria U17	3	(0)
- * Club domestic league appearances and goals as of 27 June 2026

Andreas Pfingstner (born 24 March 1993) is an Austrian footballer who plays as a centre-back for 2. Liga club ASK Voitsberg.

== Career ==
In July 2019, Pfingstner signed with Landesliga Steiermark club ASK Voitsberg.
