= Oliver Wähling =

German footballer (born 1999)

Personal information
- Date of birth: 6 September 1999 (age 27)
- Place of birth: Ludwigsburg, Germany
- Height: 1.83 m (6 ft 0 in)
- Position: Midfielder

Team information
- Current team: SSV Ulm
- Number: 10

Youth career
- –2018: Karlsruher SC

Senior career*
Years	Team	Apps	(Gls)
2018–2019	VfB Stuttgart II	33	(7)
2019–2021	Mainz 05 II	42	(5)
2021–2024	VfL Osnabrück	17	(0)
2024–2026	Blau-Weiß Linz	21	(1)
2026–	SSV Ulm	7	(1)
- * Club domestic league appearances and goals as of 24 September 2026

Oliver Wähling (born 6 September 1999) is a German professional footballer who plays as a midfielder for SSV Ulm.

== Club career ==
In June 2021, Wähling joined 3. Liga side VfL Osnabrück on a free transfer from Mainz 05 II, having spent the previous three seasons playing in Regionalliga. On 15 January 2022, Wähling made his professional league debut for VfL Osnabrück as a late substitute in a 2–1 victory over Saarbrücken.

On 4 June 2024, Wähling signed a two-year contract with Blau-Weiß Linz in Austria.
