= Sebastian Wimmer =

Austrian footballer

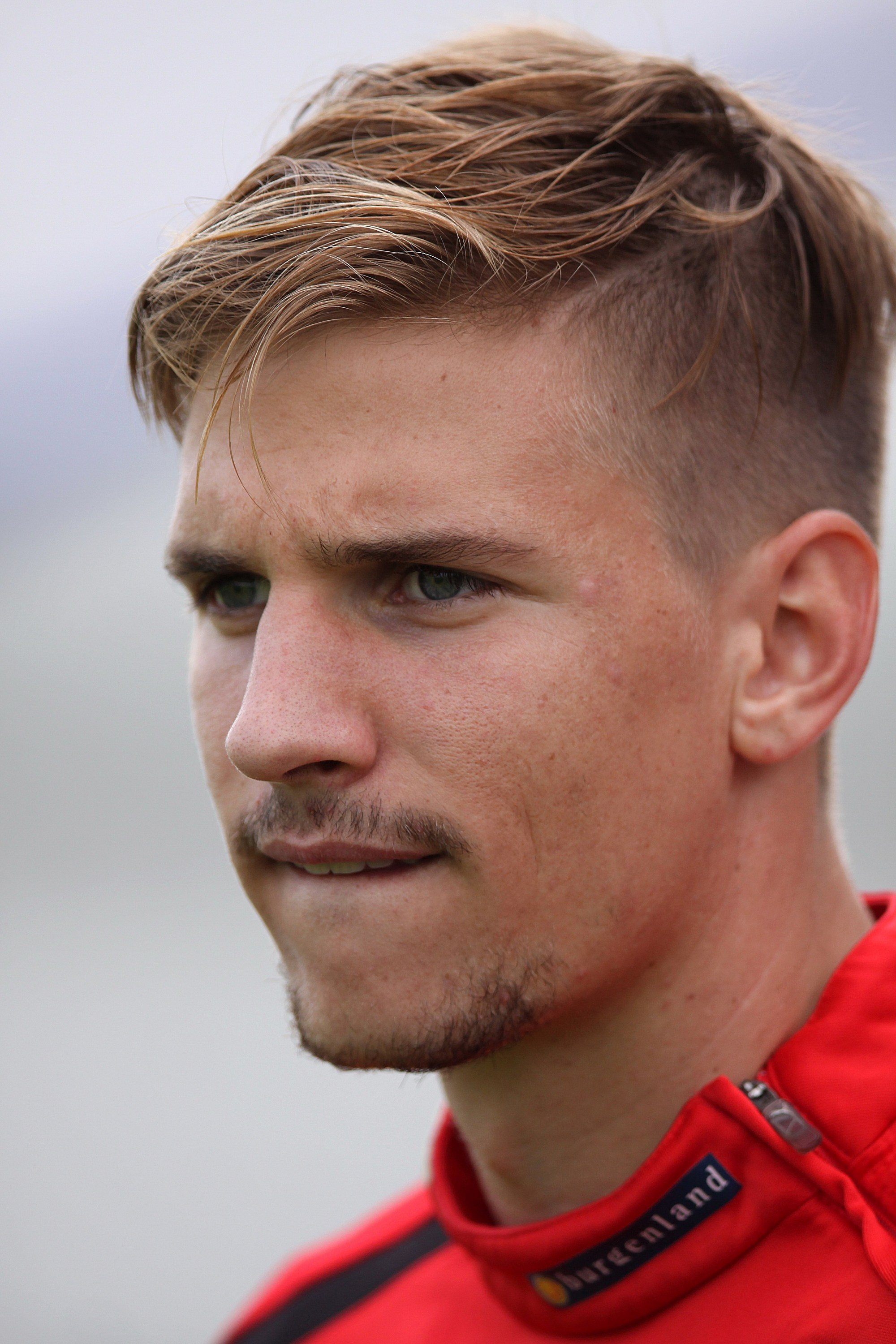
- Wimmer in 2015

Personal information
- Date of birth: 15 January 1994 (age 32)
- Place of birth: Linz, Austria
- Height: 1.87 m (6 ft 2 in)
- Position: Defensive midfielder

Team information
- Current team: SKU Amstetten
- Number: 18

Youth career
- 2000–2008: SK Bad Wimsbach 1933
- 2008–2011: AKA Linz

Senior career*
Years	Team	Apps	(Gls)
2011–2012	LASK Linz II	16	(1)
2011–2012	LASK Linz	4	(0)
2012–2015	Austria Wien	0	(0)
2012–2013	Austria Wien II	25	(2)
2013–2014	→ SC-ESV Parndorf 1919 (loan)	31	(2)
2014–2015	→ SV Horn (loan)	12	(1)
2015	→ Wiener Neustadt (loan)	4	(0)
2015–2017	VfL Wolfsburg II	57	(9)
2017–2018	SC Paderborn	16	(0)
2018–2019	Viktoria Köln	21	(1)
2019–2020	FSV Zwickau	8	(0)
2020–2024	FC Juniors OÖ	79	(17)
2024–	SKU Amstetten	54	(11)

International career
2009–2010	Austria U16	4	(0)
2010–2011	Austria U17	9	(0)
2011	Austria U18	1	(1)
2011–2013	Austria U19	16	(2)
2014–2015	Austria U21	4	(0)
- * Club domestic league appearances and goals as of 17 May 2026

Sebastian Wimmer (born 15 January 1994) is an Austrian footballer who plays as a defensive midfielder for SKU Amstetten.
