= Lukas Deinhofer =

Austrian footballer

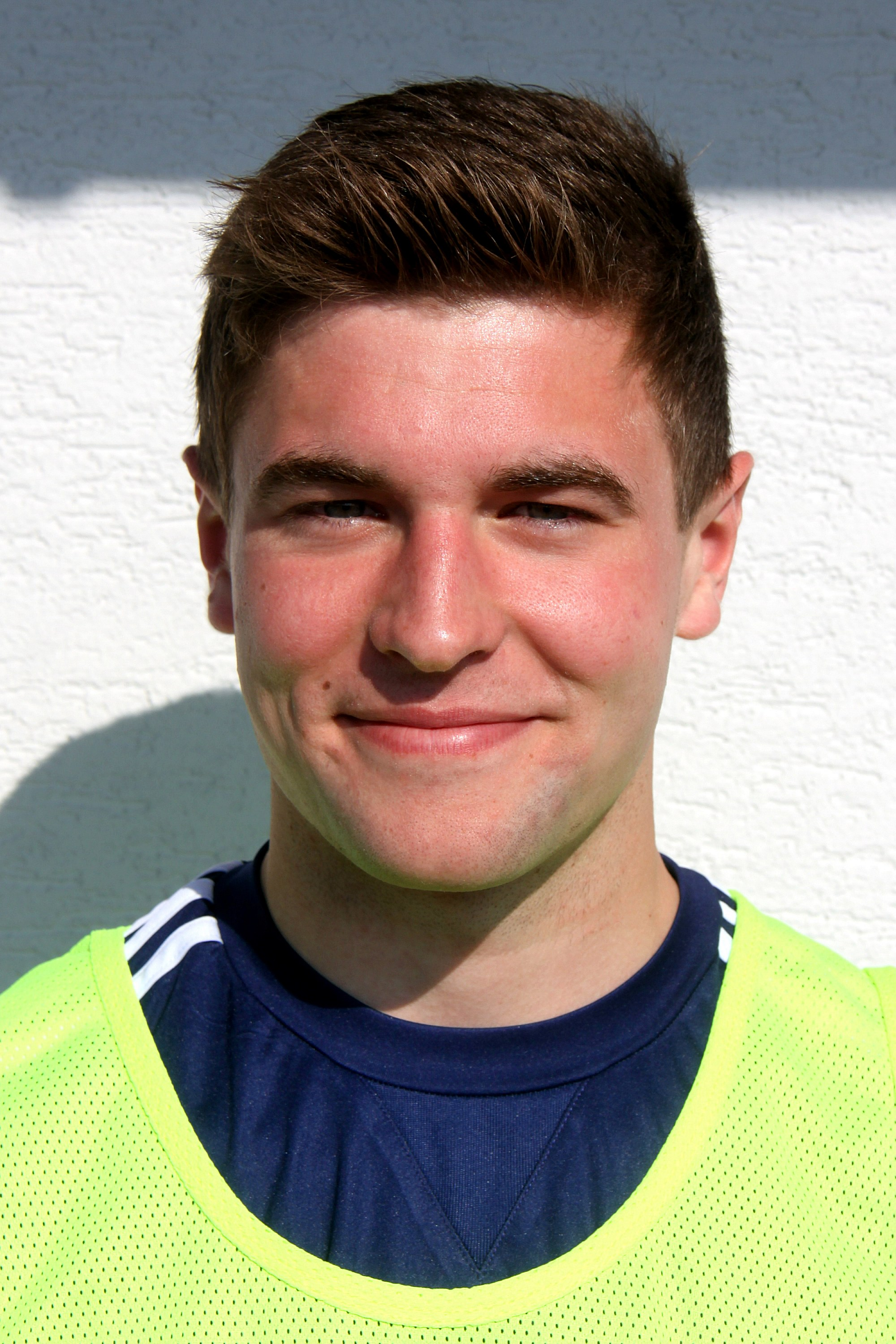
- Deinhofer in 2014

Personal information
- Date of birth: 20 March 1994 (age 32)
- Place of birth: Amstetten, Austria
- Height: 1.77 m (5 ft 10 in)
- Position: Right-back

Team information
- Current team: SKU Amstetten
- Number: 12

Youth career
- 2001–2007: USV Ferschnitz
- 2007–2008: SCU Ardagger
- 2008–2011: FC Waidhofen/Ybbs

Senior career*
Years	Team	Apps	(Gls)
2011	FC Waidhofen/Ybbs	12	(0)
2011–2013	SCU Ardagger	40	(5)
2013–2023	SKU Amstetten	239	(7)
2023	SCU Euratsfeld		
2024–	SKU Amstetten	55	(0)
- * Club domestic league appearances and goals as of 17 May 2026

Lukas Deinhofer (born 20 March 1994) is an Austrian professional footballer who plays as a right-back for Austrian Football Second League club SKU Amstetten.
