= Marco Sulzner =

Austrian footballer

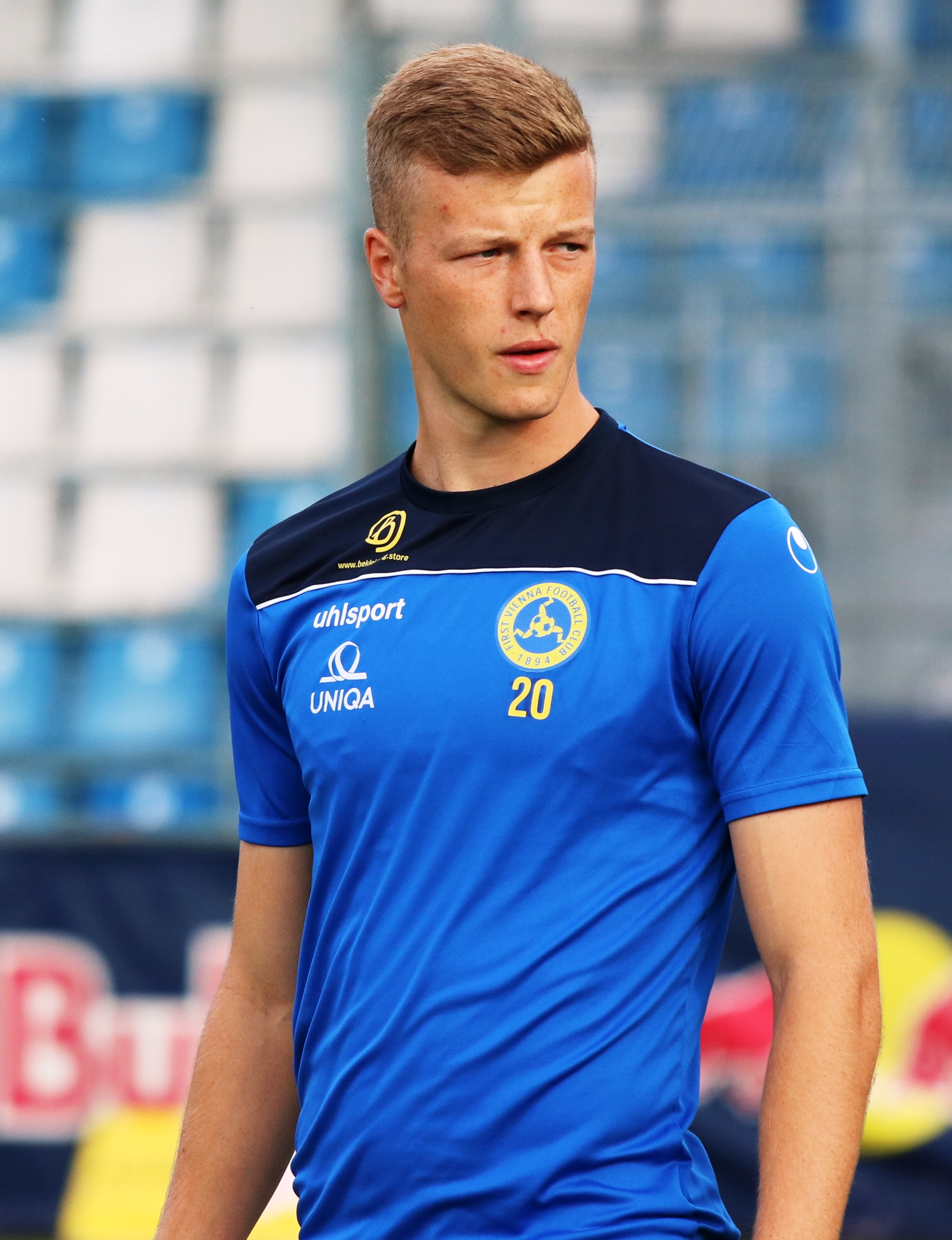
- Sulzner in 2022

Personal information
- Full name: Marco Alessandro Sulzner
- Date of birth: 2 July 2003 (age 23)
- Place of birth: Steyr, Austria
- Height: 1.90 m (6 ft 3 in)
- Position: Defender

Team information
- Current team: Wolfsberger AC
- Number: 30

Youth career
- 2009–2017: ATSV Stein
- 2017–2020: LASK

Senior career*
Years	Team	Apps	(Gls)
2020–2025	Juniors OÖ	27	(2)
2022–2025	LASK	11	(0)
2022–2023	→ First Vienna FC (loan)	28	(0)
2023–2024	→ SKU Amstetten (loan)	23	(0)
2025–	Wolfsberger AC	25	(1)
- * Club domestic league appearances and goals as of 8 June 2026

Marco Alessandro Sulzner (born 2 July 2003) is an Austrian professional footballer who plays as a defender for Austrian Football Bundesliga side Wolfsberger AC.

== Club career ==
On 7 February 2022, Sulzner signed with Austrian Football Bundesliga club LASK. As LASK and Sulzner's previous club Juniors OÖ are under a cooperation agreement, he is eligible to play for either club. Sulzner made his Bundesliga debut for LASK on 19 February 2022 against Admira Wacker.

In June 2025, Sulzner joined Austrian Bundesliga side Wolfsberger AC on a two-year contract with the option for a further twelve months.

== Career statistics ==
=== Club ===
As of match played 17 May 2025.

Appearances and goals by club, season and competition
Club	Season	League			Cup		Continental		Other		Total	
Club	Season	Division	Apps	Goals	Apps	Goals	Apps	Goals	Apps	Goals	Apps	Goals
Juniors OÖ	2019–20	2. Liga	2	0	–		–		–		2	0
Juniors OÖ	2021–22	2. Liga	25	2	–		–		–		25	2
Juniors OÖ	Total		27	2	–		–		–		27	2
LASK	2021–22	Austrian Bundesliga	4	0	–		0	0	–		4	0
LASK	2024–25	Austrian Bundesliga	7	0	2	0	0	0	–		9	0
LASK	Total		11	0	2	0	0	0	–		13	0
First Vienna FC (loan)	2022–23	2. Liga	28	0	1	0	–		–		29	0
SKU Amstetten (loan)	2023–24	2. Liga	23	0	3	0	–		–		26	0
LASK II	2024–25	Regionalliga Mitte	10	7	–		–		–		10	7
Wolfsberger AC	2025–26	Austrian Bundesliga	0	0	0	0	–		–		0	0
Career total			99	9	6	0	0	0	0	0	105	9
