= Patrik Mijić =

Croatian footballer (born 1998)

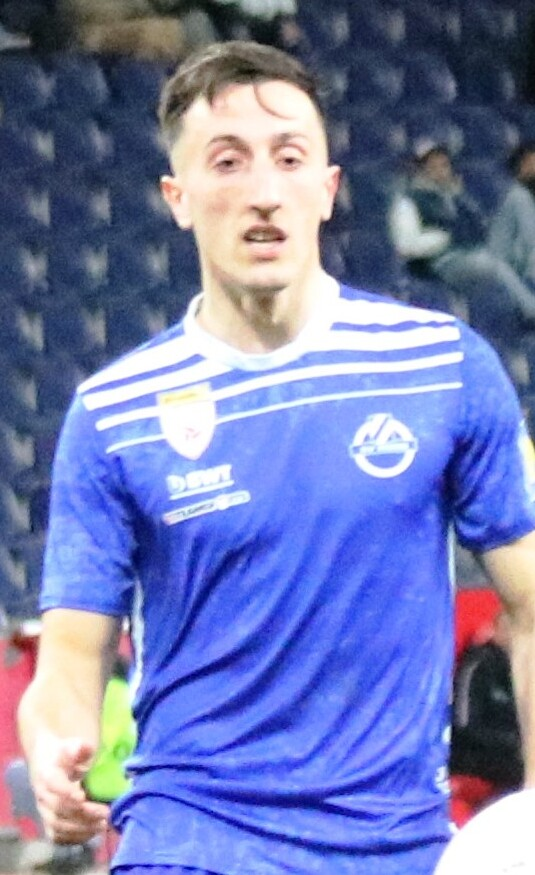
- Mijić in 2023

Personal information
- Date of birth: 4 November 1998 (age 28)
- Place of birth: Slavonski Brod, Croatia
- Height: 1.87 m (6 ft 2 in)
- Position: Forward

Team information
- Current team: A.E. Kifisia (on loan from TSV Hartberg)
- Number: 90

Senior career*
Years	Team	Apps	(Gls)
–2018	HNK Željezničar Slavonski Brod		
2018–2019	NK Oriolik		
2020	NK Omladinac Gornja Vrba		
2020	NK Međimurje	15	(6)
2021	Dinamo Zagreb II	15	(3)
2021	Sesvete	10	(2)
2022	FC Dornbirn	15	(7)
2022–2023	SV Horn	26	(7)
2023	ViOn Zlaté Moravce	14	(0)
2024	Rogaška	14	(11)
2024–	TSV Hartberg	44	(13)
2026–	→ A.E. Kifisia (loan)	10	(0)
- * Club domestic league appearances and goals as of 14 June 2026

Patrik Mijić (born 4 November 1998) is a Croatian professional footballer who plays as a forward for Greek club A.E. Kifisia, on loan from Austrian Bundesliga club TSV Hartberg.

== Career ==
Mijić started his career with Croatian side HNK Željezničar Slavonski Brod before signing for Croatian side NK Oriolik in 2018. In 2020, he signed for Croatian side NK Omladinac Gornja Vrba. The same year, he signed for Croatian side NK Međimurje. Subsequently, he signed for Croatian side Dinamo Zagreb II in 2021. Six months later, he signed for Croatian side Sesvete.

Following his stint there, he signed for Austrian side FC Dornbirn in 2022. Ahead of the 2022–23 season, he signed for Austrian side SV Horn. Afterwards, he signed for Slovak side ViOn Zlaté Moravce in 2023. Half a year later, he signed for Slovenian side Rogaška, helping the club win the Slovenian Cup. During the summer of 2024, he signed for Austrian side TSV Hartberg.

== Personal life ==
Mijić was born on 4 May 1998 in Slavonski Brod, Croatia, has a brother and is a native of Slavonski Brod, Croatia. As hobbies, he enjoys reading and playing PlayStation.
