= Otar Mamageishvili =

Georgian footballer (born 2003)

Personal information
- Date of birth: 15 January 2003 (age 23)
- Height: 1.80 m (5 ft 11 in)
- Position: Midfielder

Team information
- Current team: Wolfsberger (on loan from Famalicão)
- Number: 19

Youth career
- 2009–2020: Saburtalo

Senior career*
Years	Team	Apps	(Gls)
2021–2024	Iberia 1999	90	(15)
2025–	Famalicão	12	(0)
2026–	→ Wolfsberger (loan)	3	(0)

International career^{‡}
2020	Georgia U17	3	(0)
2021–2022	Georgia U19	5	(1)
2022–2025	Georgia U21	24	(3)
- * Club domestic league appearances and goals as of 15 August 2026 ‡ National team caps and goals as of 18 June 2025

Otar Mamageishvili (Georgian: ოთარ მამაგეიშვილი; born 15 January 2003) is a Georgian professional footballer who plays as a midfielder for Austrian Bundesliga club Wolfsberger on loan from Pourtuguese club Famalicão.

Mamageishvili has represented his country in all national youth teams. Apart from winning the Erovnuli Liga once and the national cup twice, he has received an individual Midfielder of the Year award in the Georgian top league.

== Career ==
=== Club ===
Mamageishvili entered Saburtalo's academy at the age of six. Having come through the club's youth ranks, he played for the reserve team before making his first-team debut in the Erovnuli Liga at the age of 18. He scored his first top-flight goal on 29 November 2021 as Saburtalo came from behind to beat Shukura. Nine days later, Mamageishvili lifted the first trophy after his team cruised to victory over Samgurali in the cup final.

At an annual awards ceremony organized by the Georgian Football Federation in December 2021, Mamageishvili received the Aleksandre Chivadze silver medal for U19 players.

On 7 December 2023, Saburtalo claimed another cup title following a narrow injury-time victory over Dinamo Batumi with Mamageishvili playing full time. Overall, he took part in all five matches of Saburtalo's cup campaign this season.

Both the player and his team enjoyed more successful season the next year. As the club changed its name into Iberia 1999, Mamageishvili became the league champion for the first time in his career. His performance was duly rewarded after winning nomination for the 2024 Erovnuli Liga Midfielder of the Year award.

In January 2025, Mamageishvili moved to Portuguese Primeira Liga club Famalicão on a four-year deal.

=== International ===
Mamageishvili was fifteen years old when he was called up to the U15 team.

After taking part in three 2020 UEFA under 17 Championship qualifiers in the autumn of 2019, Mamageishvili joined U19s. He played both in first and elite rounds of the 2022 UEFA European under-19 Championship qualifiers and scored a winner against Kosovo on 9 October 2022.

Mamageishvili was among the players called up for the U21 team which participated in 2023 UEFA European Championship co-hosted by Georgia.

In 2023–24, Mamageishvili played in all ten games of Georgia's 2025 UEFA Championship qualifying campaign in addition to both play-offs against Croatia, in which his team prevailed on penalties. He netted in a 2–0 home win against Gibraltar on 6 September 2023, followed by another goal in a 3–1 away loss to Netherlands on 9 September 2024.

== Career statistics ==
As of 1 March 2025

Appearances and goals by club, season and competition
Club	Season	League			National cup		Continental		Other		Total	
Club	Season	Division	Apps	Goals	Apps	Goals	Apps	Goals	Apps	Goals	Apps	Goals
Iberia 1999	2021	Erovnuli Liga	4	2	2	0	—		—		6	2
Iberia 1999	2022	Erovnuli Liga	26	2	3	0	4 (Note: Appearances in UEFA Conference League qualifiers)	0	—		33	2
Iberia 1999	2023	Erovnuli Liga	31	5	5	0	—		—		36	5
Iberia 1999	2024	Erovnuli Liga	29	6	—		3	0	1 (Note: Appearance in Georgian Super Cup)	0	33	6
Iberia 1999	Total		90	15	10	0	7	0	1	0	108	15
Famalicão	2024–25	Primeira Liga	3	0	—		—		—		3	0
Total			93	15	10	0	7	0	1	0	111	15

== Honours ==
=== Club ===
==== Saburtalo / Iberia 1999 ====
- Erovnuli Liga (1): 2024
- Georgian Cup (2): 2021, 2023

=== Individual ===
- Erovnuli Liga Midfielder of the Year: 2024

== Personal life ==
Otar has played most of his career with his twin brother Gizo Mamageishvili both at the club and national youth teams.
