= Union-Platz =

Stadium in Amstetten, Austria

Coordinates: 48.1152°N 14.8774°E

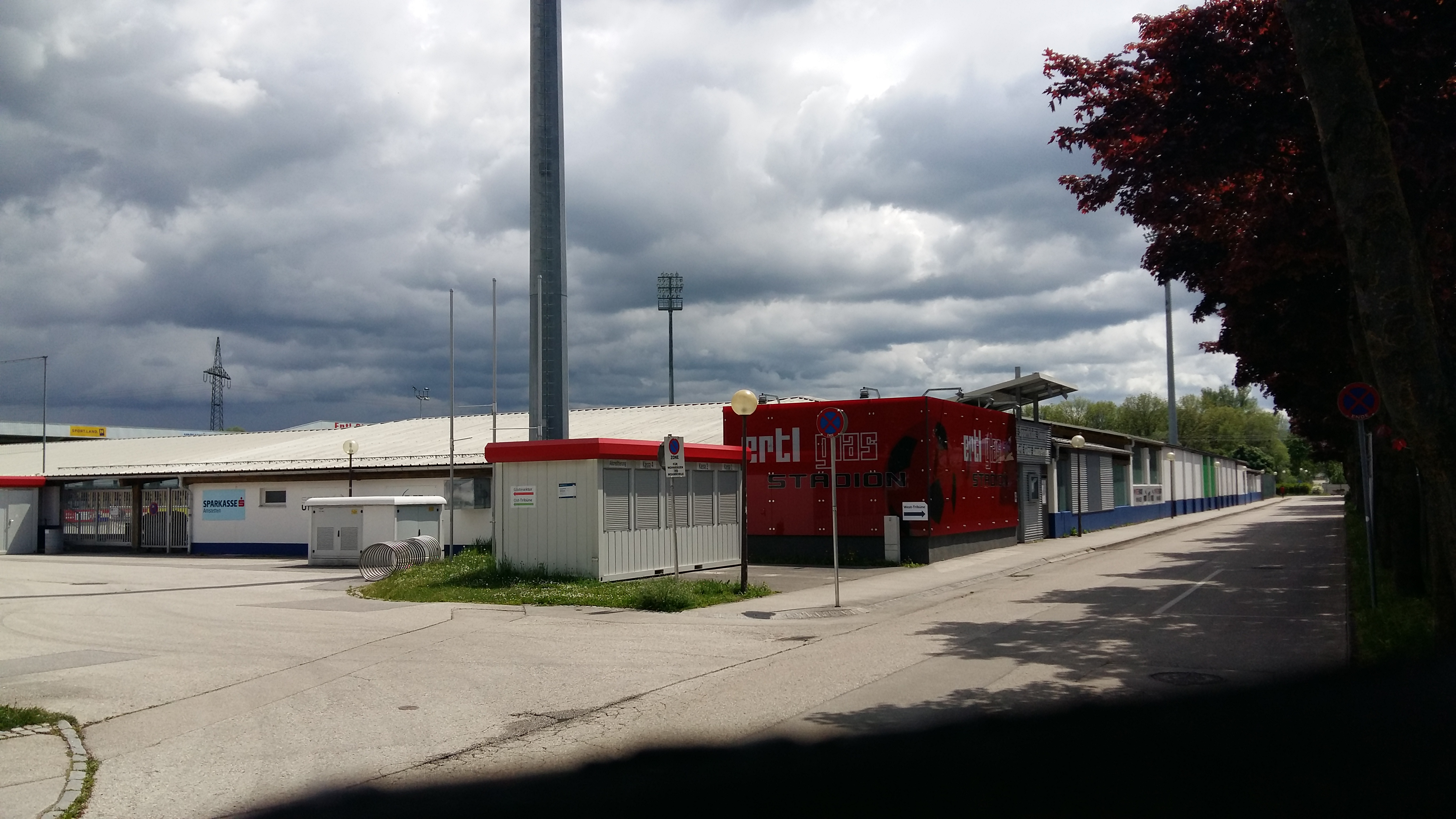
- Ertl-Glas-Stadion
- Interactive map of Union-Platz
- Full name: Ertl-Glas-Stadion
- Location: Amstetten, Austria
- Capacity: 3,030 (1000 covered)
- Surface: Grass
- Field size: 105 × 68 m

Construction
- Renovated: 2007, 2017

Tenant
- SKU Amstetten

The Union-Platz, officially known as Ertl-Glas-Stadion for sponsorship reasons, is a stadium in Amstetten, Lower Austria, and the homeground of SKU Amstetten.

In 2007 and 2008, the stadium was completely renovated and expanded and offers 600 covered seats and standing places on the "Sparkassen-Tribüne" (west side) and approx. 400 covered standing places on the "North Stand", where you can find the supporters of SKU.
