= David Peham =

Austrian footballer (born 1992)

Personal information
- Date of birth: 20 February 1992 (age 34)
- Place of birth: Amstetten, Austria
- Height: 1.83 m (6 ft 0 in)
- Position: Forward

Team information
- Current team: SKU Amstetten
- Number: 9

Youth career
- 2006: ASK Ybbs
- 2006–2010: AKA St. Polten

Senior career*
Years	Team	Apps	(Gls)
2010–2012	FC Admira Wacker Mödling II	43	(4)
2012–2013	SV Gaflenz	26	(6)
2013–2015	SK Vorwärts Steyr	55	(9)
2015–2021	SKU Amstetten	156	(62)
2021–2023	Grazer AK	55	(15)
2023–2025	First Vienna	49	(12)
2025–	SKU Amstetten	27	(15)
- * Club domestic league appearances and goals as of 17 May 2026

David Peham (born 20 February 1992) is an Austrian professional footballer who plays as a midfielder for SKU Amstetten.

== Club career ==
On 16 August 2021 he signed a three-year contract with Grazer AK.

On 26 July 2023, Peham signed with First Vienna FC on two-year contract.
