= Marcus Maier =

Austrian footballer (born 1995)

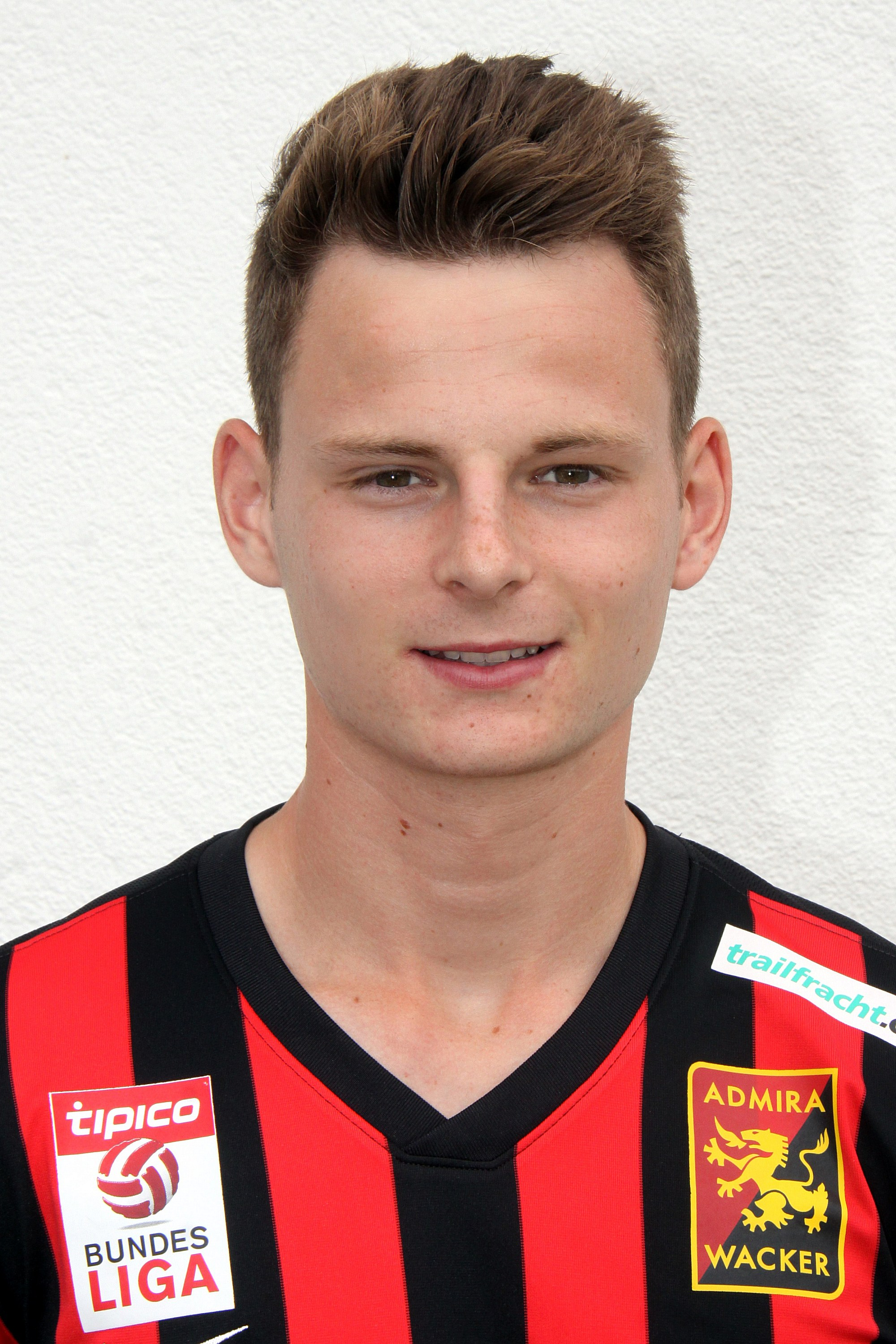

Personal information
- Date of birth: 18 December 1995 (age 30)
- Place of birth: Vienna, Austria
- Height: 1.74 m (5 ft 9 in)
- Position: Midfielder

Team information
- Current team: Floridsdorfer AC
- Number: 18

Senior career*
Years	Team	Apps	(Gls)
2013–2021	Admira Wacker II	71	(1)
2014–2021	Admira Wacker	90	(1)
2022–	Floridsdorfer AC	110	(4)

International career^{‡}
2015	Austria U20	2	(0)
- * Club domestic league appearances and goals as of 17 May 2026 ‡ National team caps and goals as of 24 May 2015

Marcus Maier (born 18 December 1995) is an Austrian footballer who plays for Floridsdorfer AC.

== Club career ==
On 12 January 2022, Maier joined Floridsdorfer AC.
