= Andrija Bošnjak =

Croatian footballer (born 1996)

Personal information
- Date of birth: 26 March 1996 (age 30)
- Place of birth: Ljubuški , Bosnia and Herzegovina
- Height: 1.87 m (6 ft 2 in)
- Position: Forward

Team information
- Current team: FC Hertha Wels
- Number: 33

Youth career
- Vinjani
- Imotski

Senior career*
Years	Team	Apps	(Gls)
2014–2017	Imotski	53	(5)
2018	1860 Rosenheim	16	(1)
2019–2020	Wacker Burghausen	33	(14)
2021	Haka	20	(1)
2022–2024	Wacker Burghausen	75	(20)
2024–	FC Hertha Wels	54	(22)
- * Club domestic league appearances and goals as of 17 May 2026

Andrija Bošnjak (born 26 March 1996) is a Croatian professional footballer who plays as a forward for Austrian Football Second League club FC Hertha Wels.

== Club career ==
In April 2021, Bošnjak moved to Finland after signing with Veikkausliiga club Haka.

In early 2022, he returned to his former club SV Wacker Burghausen in German Regionalliga Bayern.

== Career statistics ==
As of 4 June 2025

Appearances and goals by club, season and competition
Club	Season	League			National cup (Note: Includes Suomen Cup)		Other		Total	
Club	Season	Division	Apps	Goals	Apps	Goals	Apps	Goals	Apps	Goals
Imotski	2014–15	Prva NL	3	0	–		–		3	0
Imotski	2015–16	Prva NL	20	1	–		–		20	1
Imotski	2016–17	Prva NL	30	4	–		–		30	4
Imotski	Total		53	5	0	0	0	0	53	5
1860 Rosenheim	2018–19	Regionalliga Bayern	16	1	–		1 (Note: Appearances in Bavarian Cup)	0	17	1
Wacker Burghausen	2018–19	Regionalliga Bayern	10	6	–		–		10	6
Wacker Burghausen	2019–20	Regionalliga Bayern	23	8	–		3 (Note: Appearances in Ligapokal RL Bayern)	4	26	12
Wacker Burghausen	Total		33	14	0	0	3	4	36	18
Haka	2021	Veikkausliiga	20	1	0	0	–		20	1
Wacker Burghausen	2021–22	Regionalliga Bayern	14	5	–		–		14	5
Wacker Burghausen	2022–23	Regionalliga Bayern	34	5	–		3	0	37	5
Wacker Burghausen	2023–24	Regionalliga Bayern	27	10	–		3	3	30	13
Wacker Burghausen	Total		75	20	0	0	6	3	81	23
FC Hertha Wels	2024–25	Austrian Regionalliga Central	28	20	2	0	–		30	20
Career total			225	61	2	0	10	7	237	68
