= Emmanuel Agyemang =

Ghanaian footballer (born 2004)

Personal information
- Full name: Emmanuel Ofori Agyemang
- Date of birth: 3 January 2004 (age 22)
- Place of birth: Western Region, Ghana
- Height: 1.80 m (5 ft 11 in)
- Position: Midfielder

Team information
- Current team: Wolfsberger AC
- Number: 34

Youth career
- WAFA

Senior career*
Years	Team	Apps	(Gls)
2021–2023	WAFA	36	(3)
2023–2024	Wolfsberger AC II	19	(2)
2024–	Wolfsberger AC	48	(2)
- * Club domestic league appearances and goals as of 10 June 2026 ‡ National team caps and goals as of 15:26, 7 July 2025 (UTC)

Emmanuel Ofori Agyemang (born 3 January 2004) is a Ghanaian professional football player who plays as a midfielder for Austrian Football Bundesliga club Wolfsberger AC.

== Career ==
A youth product of the Ghanaian club WAFA, Agyemang debuted with them in the Ghana Premier League in 2021. On 6 February 2024, he signed a professional contract with the Austrian club Wolfsberger AC after a successful trial, initially assigned to their reserves. He helped Wolfsberg win their first trophy, the 2024–25 Austrian Cup. In the 2024–25 season he was promoted to their senior team in the Austrian Football Bundesliga with four goals and six assists, earning interest from abroad and a new contract offer from Wolfsberg.

== Honours ==
Wolfsberger AC

- Austrian Cup: 2024–25
