= Wolfsberger AC =

Austrian professional football club

Wolfsberger
- Full name: Riegler & Zechmeister Pellets Wolfsberger Athletik Club
- Nickname: RZ Pellets WAC
- Founded: 1931; 95 years ago
- Ground: Lavanttal-Arena, Wolfsberg
- Capacity: 7,300
- Owner(s): Dietmar Riegler and Otto Zechmeister
- Chairman: Dietmar Riegler
- Manager: Thomas Silberberger
- League: Austrian Bundesliga
- 2025–26: Austrian Bundesliga, 8th of 12
- Website: www.rzpelletswac.at
Home colours	Away colours

Wolfsberger Athletik Club (commonly known as Wolfsberger AC or WAC) is a professional Austrian football club based in Wolfsberg, Carinthia. The team competes in the Austrian Football Bundesliga, the top flight of Austrian football, and is known as RZ Pellets WAC for sponsorship purposes.

Founded in 1931, Wolfsberger spent most of their history in the lower divisions before rising to prominence in the 21st century. Between 2007 and 2012 they operated in a joint venture with SK St. Andrä, competing as WAC/St. Andrä. In 2012, the club won the First League title, securing promotion to the Bundesliga for the first time, where they finished fifth in their debut top-flight campaign.

Wolfsberger established themselves as a stable Bundesliga side and qualified for European competition on multiple occasions, most notably reaching the 2019–20 UEFA Europa League group stage after finishing third in the 2018–19 Bundesliga. The club claimed its first major honour in 2025, winning the Austrian Cup with a 1–0 victory over TSV Hartberg.

== History ==
Wolfsberger AC was founded by Adolf Ptazcowsky, Karl Weber, Hermann Maierhofer, Franz Hafner and Michael Schlacher in 1931. After spending the first thirty-seven years of its existence on lower tiers of the Austrian league pyramid, the club eventually achieved promotion to the Austrian Regional League, which was on the second tier of the pyramid at that time, in 1968. WAC stayed at this level, with one exception during the 1977–78 season, for the next seventeen years, establishing themselves as a mid-table side.

At the end of the 1984–85 season, Wolfsberger AC eventually dropped back to the third level. The club returned for two further second-level appearances during the 1988–89 and 1990–91 seasons, but was immediately relegated each time. In 1994, the club was a founding member of the reactivated Regional League as the third tier of the pyramid. After being in the promotion race for the first few years in the new league, strength of the club gradually declined and eventually led to relegation at the end of the 2001–02 season.

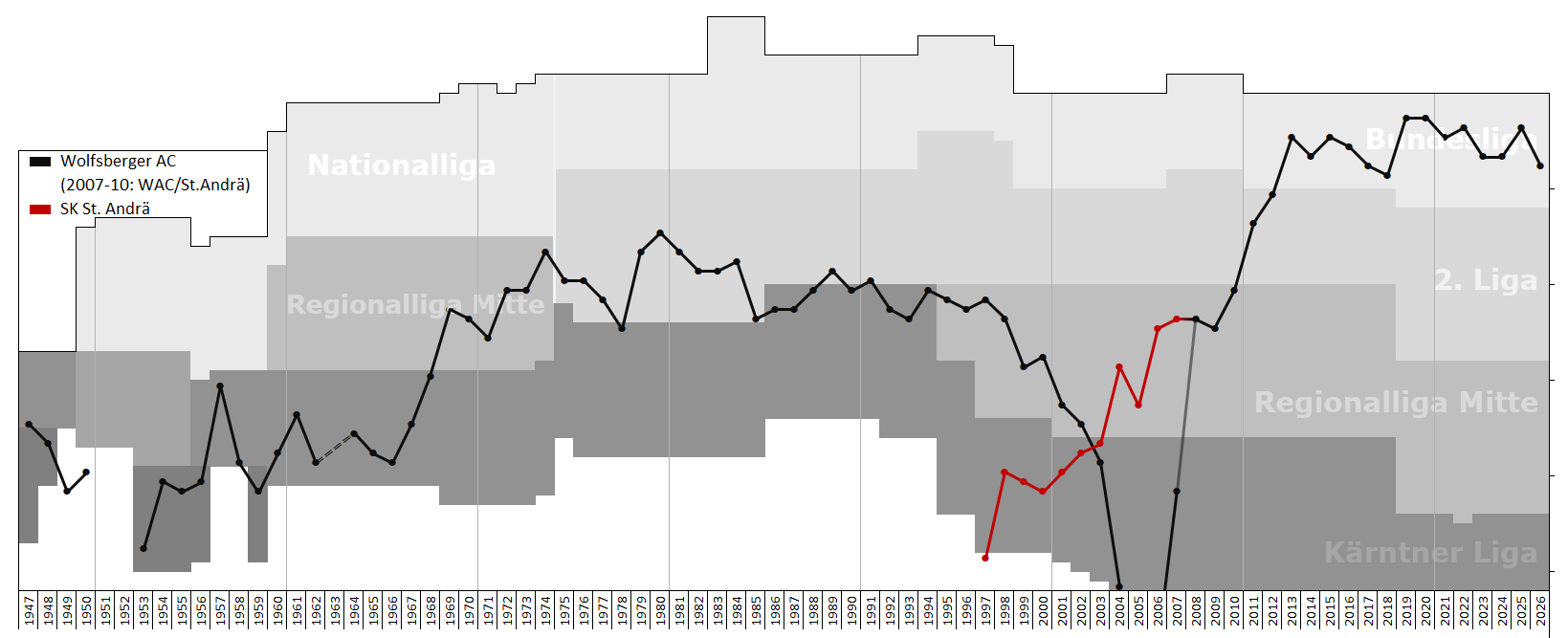
Historical chart of Worfsberger AC league performance

In 2007, WAC and neighbours SK St. Andrä decided to enter a cooperation. While both clubs remained as separate entities, they closely worked together on almost all aspects: "Central areas of both clubs like administration, management, economy, marketing, gastronomy, as well as the athletic section as the core (both the senior and junior teams) will be centrally administered from the newly created offices of WAC/St. Andrä at Wolfsberg." Since SK St. Andrä were playing at the Regional League, the team began at this level, from which it was promoted to the First League in 2010. At the end of the 2011–12 season, the cooperation secured promotion to the Bundesliga with one round of matches to go. Soon afterwards, the cooperation was dissolved; Wolfsberger AC thus competed as an independent club on the highest level of Austrian football for the first time in their history.

After their first year in the highest class they came in 5th. After the season manager Nenad Bjelica left the club and became manager of FK Austria Wien, the champion of the 2012–13 season. Slobodan Grubor replaced him but after weak performances in the new season he was replaced by Dietmar Kühbauer.

The team became known as 'RZ Pellets WAC' from the 2014–15 season, due to sponsorship.

Wolfsberger AC qualified to the 2019–20 UEFA Europa League group stage for first time in their history, after finishing third in the 2018–19 Austrian Football Bundesliga. They were knocked in the last 32 after losing 8–1 on aggregate to Premier League side Tottenham Hotspur.

In the 2024/25 season Wolfsberger AC sensationally won the Austrian Cup and finished 4th in the Bundesliga, being in the title race until the very last matchday.

== Honours ==
=== Domestic ===
==== League ====
- 2. Liga
  - Winners (1): 2011–12

==== Cup ====
- Austrian Cup
  - Winners (1): 2024–25

== European record ==
Season	Competition	Round	Opponent	Home	Away	Aggregate
2015–16	UEFA Europa League	2Q	(Belarus) Shakhtyor Soligorsk	2–0	1–0	3–0
2015–16	UEFA Europa League	3Q	(Germany) Borussia Dortmund	0–1	0–5	0–6
2019–20	UEFA Europa League	Group J	(Italy) Roma	1–1	2–2	4th out of 4
2019–20	UEFA Europa League	Group J	(Germany) Borussia Mönchengladbach	0–1	4–0	4th out of 4
2019–20	UEFA Europa League	Group J	(Turkey) İstanbul Başakşehir	0–3	0–1	4th out of 4
2020–21	UEFA Europa League	Group K	(Russia) CSKA Moscow	1–1	1–0	2nd out of 4
2020–21	UEFA Europa League	Group K	(Croatia) Dinamo Zagreb	0–3	0–1	2nd out of 4
2020–21	UEFA Europa League	Group K	(Netherlands) Feyenoord	1–0	4–1	2nd out of 4
2020–21	UEFA Europa League	R32	(England) Tottenham Hotspur	1–4	0–4	1–8
2022–23	UEFA Europa Conference League	3Q	(Malta) Gżira United	0–0	4–0	4–0
2022–23	UEFA Europa Conference League	PO	(Norway) Molde	0–4	1–0	1–4
2025–26	UEFA Europa League	3Q	(Greece) PAOK	0–1 (a.e.t.)	0–0	0–1
2025–26	UEFA Conference League	PO	(Cyprus) Omonia	2–1	0–1 (a.e.t.)	2–2 (4–5 p)

== Current squad ==
As of 8 September 2026

Note: Flags indicate national team as defined under FIFA eligibility rules; some limited exceptions apply. Players may hold more than one non-FIFA nationality.

No.	Pos.	Nation	Player
1	GK	AUT	Lukas Gütlbauer
2	DF	SRB	Boris Matić
6	DF	AUT	Raffael Behounek
7	FW	AUT	Luca Hassler
8	MF	AUT	Simon Piesinger
9	FW	ALB	Giacomo Vrioni
10	MF	KOS	Donis Avdijaj
11	DF	AUT	Aaron Sky Schwarz
12	GK	ISR	Lior Gliklich
15	DF	CIV	Cheick Mamadou Diabaté
17	MF	AUT	Marco Schabauer
18	MF	AUT	Michael Schweiger
19	MF	GEO	Otar Mamageishvili (on loan from Famalicão)
20	MF	AUT	Thorsten Schriebl

No.	Pos.	Nation	Player
21	GK	AUT	David Skubl
22	MF	SRB	Veljko Vukojević
23	FW	AUT	Phillip Verhounig
30	MF	AUT	Marco Sulzner
31	DF	AUT	Fabian Wohlmuth
32	FW	AUT	Markus Pink
34	MF	GHA	Emmanuel Agyemang
35	DF	AUT	Matteo Kitz
36	MF	AUT	Dominik Fitz (on loan from Minnesota United)
37	DF	AUT	Nicolas Wimmer
49	FW	CIV	Sankara Karamoko
70	DF	SRB	David Đurić
77	DF	AUT	Rene Renner

=== Out on loan ===
Note: Flags indicate national team as defined under FIFA eligibility rules; some limited exceptions apply. Players may hold more than one non-FIFA nationality.

No. / Pos. / Nation / Player; — / FW / AUT / Erik Kojzek (at Partizan until 30 June 2027)	No. / Pos. / Nation / Player; — / FW / KEN / Ryan Ogam (at RFC Liège until 30 June 2027)

== Club officials ==
Position	Staff
President	(Austria) Dietmar Riegler
Vice-president	(Austria) Christian Puff
Manager	(Austria) Ismail Atalan
Assistant Manager	(Austria) Hannes Jochum
First-Team Coach	(Austria) Hannes Jochum
First-Team Goalkeeper Coach	(Austria) Mario Krassnitzer
Fitness Coach	(Austria) Hannes Sauerschnig
Athletic Coach	(Austria) Marcel Kuster
Video Analyst	(Austria) Christoph Schricker
Team Doctor	(Austria) Anton Rossmann (Austria) Torsten Lenart (Austria) Bernhard Tatschl
Physiotherapist	(Austria) Joseph Rainer
Masseur	(Austria) Sasa Rodic
Marketing Staff	(Austria) Michael Paier
Team Manager	(Austria) Florian Pessentheiner
Manager	(Austria) Markus Perchthaler
Sports Coordinator	(Austria) Roman Stary

== Managers ==
- (Austria) Helmut Kirisits (7 April 1989 – 4 November 1990, 7 June 1991 – 30 June 1991, 13 October 1992 – 17 October 1995)
- (Austria) Hans-Peter Buchleitner (1 July 1995 – 30 June 1997)
- (Austria) Peter Hrstic (1 July 2007 – 26 October 2008)
- (Austria) Hans-Peter Buchleitner (27 Oct 2008 – 9 May 2010)
- (Croatia) Nenad Bjelica (10 May 2010 – 17 June 2013)
- (Austria) Slobodan Grubor (17 June 2013 – 1 September 2013)
- (Austria) Dietmar Kühbauer (2 Sep 2013 – 25 November 2015)
- (Austria) Heimo Pfeifenberger (25 Nov 2015 – 17 March 2018)
- (Austria) Robert Ibertsberger (caretaker) (18 March 2018 – 31 May 2018)
- (Austria) Christian Ilzer (1 June 2018 – 30 June 2019)
- (Austria) Gerhard Struber (1 July 2019 – 19 November 2019)
- (Tunisia) Mohamed Sahli (caretaker) (20 Nov 2019 – 31 December 2019)
- (Austria) Ferdinand Feldhofer (1 January 2020 – 4 March 2021)
- (Austria) Roman Stary (caretaker) (4 March 2021 – 31 May 2021)
- (Germany) Robin Dutt (1 July 2021 – 5 March 2023)
- (Austria) Manfred Schmid (6 March 2023 – 30 June 2024)
- (Austria) Dietmar Kühbauer (1 July 2024 – 8 October 2025)
- (Austria) Peter Pacult (13 October 2025 – 12 November 2025)
- (Germany) Ismail Atalan (12 November 2025 – present)
