= SKU Amstetten =

Association football club in Austria

- Full name: Sportklub Union Amstetten
- Nickname: Wir fürs Mostviertel (We for Mostviertel)
- Founded: 30 November 1997; 28 years ago
- Ground: Ertl-Glas-Stadion
- Capacity: 3,000
- Chairman: Harald Vetter; Bernhard Reikersdorfer; Gerhard Reikersdorfer; Mario Holzer
- Head coach: Patrick Enengl
- League: 2. Liga
- 2025–26: 2. Liga, 5th of 16
- Website: www.sku-amstetten.at
Home colours	Away colours

Sportklub Union Amstetten, commonly known as SKU Ertl Glas Amstetten for sponsorship reasons, is a professional association football club based in the town of Amstetten, Lower Austria, that competes in the 2. Liga, the second tier of the Austrian football. Founded in 1997, it is affiliated to the Lower Austrian Football Association. The team plays its home matches at Union-Platz, where it has been based since its foundation.

== History ==
The club was formed in 1997 from a merger of two local clubs; former second division club ASK Amstetten, founded in 1932, and SC Union Amstetten, founded in 1946. Existing rivalries were pushed aside as a new board was founded by members of both clubs headed by chairman Rodolf Brunner. In the 2007–08 season, the club was promoted to the third highest league, the Austrian Regionalliga before being directly relegated to the 1. Niederösterreichische Landesliga again. In 2011, the club returned to the Regionalliga, where they established themselves until the 2017–18 season, where they managed to win promotion to the Austrian Football Second League for the first time. In the 2023–24 season, the club finished last in the 2. Liga. However, they were spared from relegation after both DSV Leoben and Mohren Dornbirn failed to gain admission to the 2. Liga, and the number of relegated clubs was reduced to two.

=== Cup performances ===
After their first successful performance in the Austrian Cup in the 2013–14 season as a Regionalliga side – a victory over the second division club SV Mattersburg and reaching the quarter-finals – they managed to knock out Austria Lustenau in the 2016–17 Austrian Cup, a club playing at the professional level. After a 2–2 draw in regular time, they won the penalty shoot-out. Before that, in the 2015–16 Austrian Cup season, Amstetten had narrowly lost to Rapid Wien on penalties in the second round.

== Stadium ==
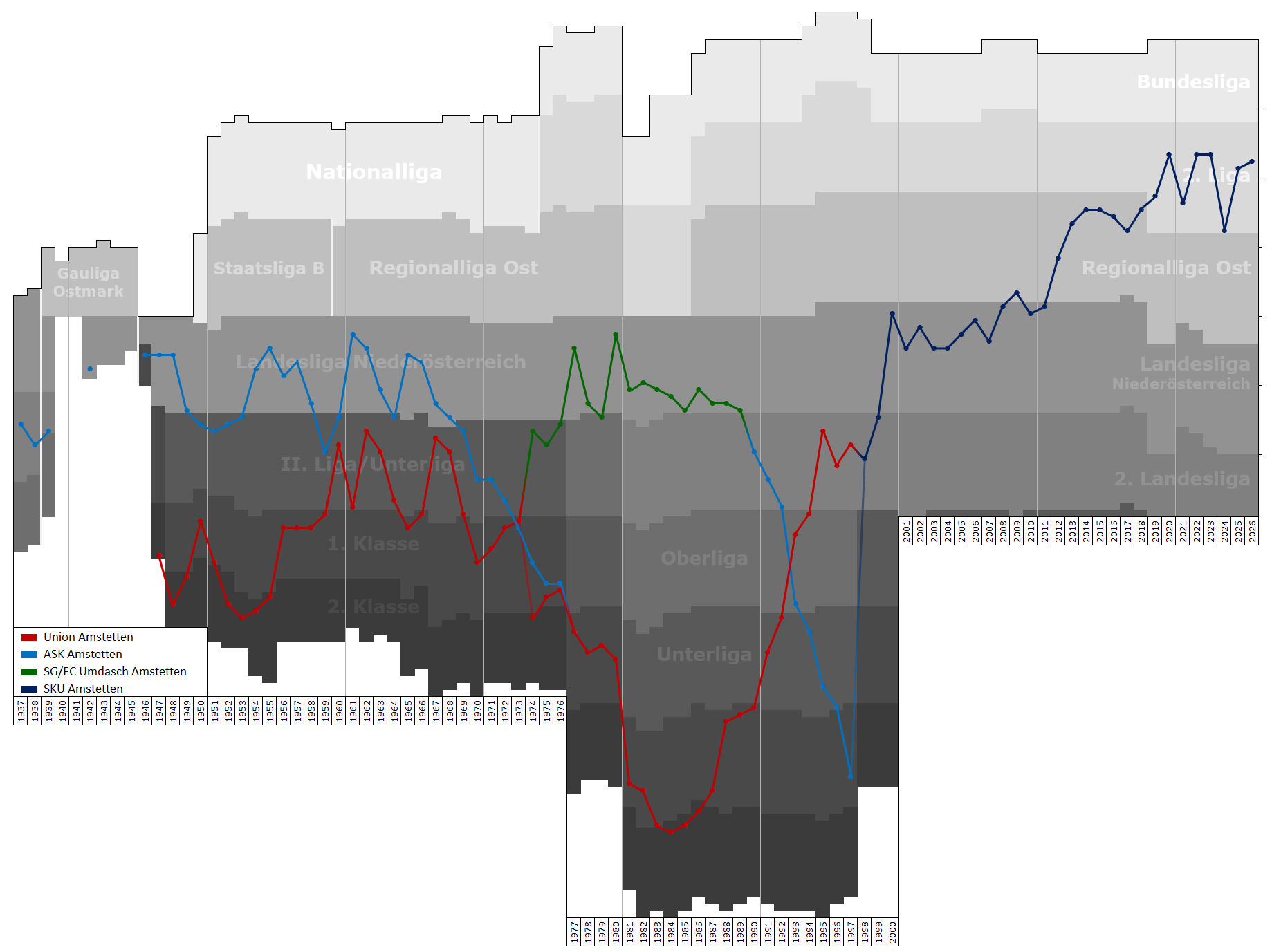
Historical league performance chart

The club plays at the modernised Union-Platz stadium, which has a capacity of 3,000.

== Current squad ==
As of 13 April 2026

Note: Flags indicate national team as defined under FIFA eligibility rules; some limited exceptions apply. Players may hold more than one non-FIFA nationality.

No.	Pos.	Nation	Player
1	GK	GER	Tiago Estevao
2	DF	AUT	Felix Köchl
4	DF	AUT	Luca Wimhofer
7	MF	AUT	Michael Oberwinkler
8	MF	AUT	Yanis Eisschill
9	FW	AUT	David Peham
10	MF	AUT	Joshua Steiger
11	MF	SLE	George Davies
12	DF	AUT	Lukas Deinhofer (captain)
13	GK	AUT	Simon Neudhart
14	FW	GAM	Aliou Conateh (on loan from Grasshopper)
15	DF	AUT	Philipp Offenthaler
16	FW	AUT	Thomas Mayer

No.	Pos.	Nation	Player
17	DF	AUT	Moritz Würdinger
18	DF	AUT	Sebastian Wimmer
19	DF	AUT	Niklas Pertlwieser
20	FW	AUT	Martin Grubhofer
24	MF	AUT	Laurenz Lanthaler
32	GK	AUT	Bernhard Scherz
35	DF	AUT	Valentino Massimiani
36	FW	AUT	Nico Zellhofer
39	DF	AUT	Laurenz Fahrnberger
40	GK	AUT	Felix Gutmann
43	FW	AUT	Felix Schönegger
48	DF	AUT	Matthias Gragger
77	MF	AUT	Maximilian Scharfetter

== Staff ==
=== Technical staff ===
Position	Staff
Head coach	(Austria) Patrick Enengl
Assistant manager	(Austria) Mag. Manuel Engleder
Goalkeeper coach	(Austria) Wolfgang Haunschmid
Fitness coach	(Austria) Patrick Schagerl
Club doctors	(Austria) Dr. Gerhard Bachner
Club doctors	(Austria) Dr. Andreas Stadlbauer
Team manager	(Austria) Matthias Götz

Source: SKU Amstetten

== Managerial history ==
- (Austria) Siegfried Aigner (1998–99)
- (Austria) Erwin Höld (1999–2001)
- (Romania) Sandu Tăbârcă (2001–2006)
- (Austria) Erwin Spiegel (2006–07)
- (Austria) Andreas Gutlederer (2007–09)
- (Austria) Harald Vetter (2009)
- (Austria) Herbert Panholzer (2009–12)
- (Austria) Walter Huemer (2012)
- (Austria) Heinz Thonhofer (2012–17)
- (Austria) Robert Weinstabl (2017–18)
- (Austria) Peter Zeitlhofer (2018–19)
- (Austria) Jochen Fallmann (2019–20)
- (Austria) Joachim Standfest (2020–21)
- (Austria) Jochen Fallmann (2021–23)
- (Austria) Patrick Enengl (2023–)
