= 2024–25 Grazer AK season =

Grazer AK
2024–25 season
- Manager: Gernot Messner (until 21 October); René Poms (from 22 October until 21 March); Ferdinand Feldhofer (from 24 March)
- Stadium: Liebenauer Stadium
- Austrian Football Bundesliga: 11th
- Austrian Cup: Third round
- Top goalscorer: League: Daniel Maderner (7); All: Daniel Maderner (8)
- Highest home attendance: 13,900 9 March 2025 vs. SK Sturm Graz
- Lowest home attendance: 4,197 16 February 2025 vs. LASK
- Average home league attendance: 8,012
- Biggest win: SVG Reichenau 0–9 Grazer AK (28 August 2024)
- Biggest defeat: SK Sturm Graz 5–2 Grazer AK (19 October 2024); Grazer AK 0–3 TSV Hartberg (8 December 2024); SK Rapid Wien 3–0 Grazer AK (16 March 2025); Grazer AK 0–3 TSV Hartberg (22 April 2025)

The 2024–25 season is the 123rd season in the history of Grazer AK, and the club's first season back in the Austrian Football Bundesliga. In addition to the domestic league, the team is scheduled to participate in the Austrian Cup.

== Transfers ==
=== In ===
Pos.	Player	Transferred from	Fee	Date	Source
MF	(Austria) Dominik Frieser	(Austria) TSV Hartberg	Free	29 May 2024	
MF	(Australia) Jacob Italiano	(Germany) Borussia Mönchengladbach	Free	18 June 2024	
DF	(Austria) Moritz Eder	(Austria) Saalfelden	Free	19 June 2024	
MF	(Slovenia) Tio Cipot	(Italy) Spezia	Loan	28 June 2024	
GK	(Austria) Juri Kirchmayr	(Germany) Wolfsburg	Free	1 July 2024	
DF	(Croatia) Petar Filipović	(Cyprus) AEL Limassol	Free	12 July 2024	
DF	(Austria) Martin Kreuzriegler	(Norway) Vålerenga	Undisclosed	19 July 2024	
FW	(Austria) Romeo Vučić	Austria Wien	Loan	19 July 2024	
MF	(Germany) Dennis Dressel	(Germany) Hansa Rostock	Free	27 July 2024	
GK	(Austria) Florian Wiegele	(Czech Republic) Viktoria Plzeň	Loan	5 January 2025	
DF	(Togo) Sadik Fofana	(Germany) Bayer Leverkusen	Free	11 January 2025	
DF	(Croatia) Antonio Tikvić	(England) Watford	Loan	22 January 2025	
MF	(Austria) Zeteny Jano	(Austria) Red Bull Salzburg	Loan	2 February 2025	

=== Out ===
Pos.	Player	Transferred to	Fee	Date	Source
MF	(Georgia (country)) Levan Eloshvili	(Austria) Kapfenberger SV	Free	7 July 2024	
DF	(Germany) Yannick Oberleitner	(Austria) SKU Amstetten	Loan	17 July 2024	
FW	(Cameroon) Kevin-Prince Milla	(Austria) ASK Voitsberg	Loan	16 August 2024	
MF	(Austria) Felix Köchl	(Austria) SKU Amstetten	Free	23 August 2024	
FW	(Cameroon) Michael Cheukoua	(China) Meizhou Hakka	Contract terminated	2 January 2025	
GK	(Austria) Juri Kirchmayr	(Austria) ASK Voitsberg	Loan	8 January 2025	
FW	(Japan) Atsushi Zaizen	(Austria) ASK Voitsberg	Loan	8 January 2025	
DF	(Austria) Michael Lang	(Austria) Kapfenberger SV	Loan	4 February 2025	

== Friendlies ==
=== Pre-season ===
29 June 2024 Friendly	SC Pinkafeld (Austria)	1–8	(Austria) Grazer AK
18:40

5 July 2024 Friendly	ASK Voitsberg (Austria)	0–2	(Austria) Grazer AK
19:00

13 July 2024 Friendly	Kapfenberg (Austria)	1–4	(Austria) Grazer AK
17:00

17 July 2024 Friendly	Grazer AK (Austria)	3–1	(Croatia) Šibenik	Graz
18:00				Stadium: Sportzentrum Graz-Weinzödl

20 July 2024 Friendly	Grazer AK (Austria)	1–5	(Turkey) Beşiktaş	Wildon
18:00	Lang 3'		Hekimoğlu 10', 12'; Rashica 20', 51'; Silva 26'	Stadium: Stadion Wildon

6 August 2024 Friendly	Grazer AK (Austria)	3–3	(Saudi Arabia) Al-Ahli
12:00

=== Mid-season ===
11 October 2024 Friendly	Grazer AK (Austria)	6–2	(Austria) ASK Voitsberg
15:30

11 January 2025 Friendly	Grazer AK (Austria)	7–1	(Austria) SC Weiz
14:00

18 January 2025 Friendly	Grazer AK (Austria)	1–1	(Croatia) Rijeka
14:30

25 January 2025 Friendly	Grazer AK (Austria)	4–1	(Austria) Kapfenberg
13:00

25 January 2025 Friendly	Grazer AK (Austria)	4–0	(Austria) ASK Voitsberg
15:00

1 February 2025 Friendly	Grazer AK (Austria)	0–1	(Ukraine) Rukh Lviv
13:30

== Competitions ==
=== Overall record ===
Competition	First match	Last match	Starting round	Record							
Competition	First match	Last match	Starting round	Pld	W	D	L	GF	GA	GD	Win %
Austrian Football Bundesliga	2 August 2024		Matchday 1	16	2	6	8	21	33	−12	12.50
Austrian Cup	26 July 2024	30 October 2024	First round	3	1	1	1	12	4	+8	33.33
Total				19	3	7	9	33	37	−4	15.79

Last updated: 8 December 2024
Source: Soccerway

=== Austrian Football Bundesliga ===
==== League table ====
Pos	Team	Pld	W	D	L	GF	GA	GD	Pts	Qualification
8	TSV Hartberg	22	6	8	8	24	31	−7	26	Qualification for the Relegation round
9	Austria Klagenfurt	22	5	6	11	22	44	−22	21	Qualification for the Relegation round
10	WSG Tirol	22	4	7	11	20	31	−11	19	Qualification for the Relegation round
11	Grazer AK	22	3	7	12	27	45	−18	16	Qualification for the Relegation round
12	Rheindorf Altach	22	3	7	12	20	35	−15	16	Qualification for the Relegation round

Source: Austrian Football Bundesliga
Rules for classification: 1) Points; 2) Head-to-head record; 3) Goal difference; 4) Goals scored; 5) Matches won; 6) Away matches won; 7) Away goals scored.

==== Results summary ====
Overall								Home						Away					
Pld	W	D	L	GF	GA	GD	Pts	W	D	L	GF	GA	GD	W	D	L	GF	GA	GD
3	0	2	1	4	5	−1	2	0	1	1	4	5	−1	0	1	0	0	0	0

Last updated: 17 August 2024.
Source: ADMIRAL Bundesliga

==== Results by round ====
Round	1	2	3
Ground	H	A	H
Result	L	D	D
Position			

Updated to match(es) played on 17 August 2024. Source: ADMIRAL Bundesliga
A = Away; H = Home; W = Win; D = Draw; L = Loss

==== Matches ====
2 August 2024 1	Grazer AK	2–3	Red Bull Salzburg	Graz
20:30	Lang 10'; Vučić 18'; Italiano (yellow card) 78'; Zaizen (yellow card) 90+2'	Report	Rosenberger 4' (o.g.); Nene 6'; Konaté 45+1' (pen.); Gourna-Douath (yellow card) 86'	Stadium: Merkur-Arena; Attendance: 9,877; Referee: Julian Weinberger

10 August 2024 2	WSG Tirol	0–0	Grazer AK	Innsbruck
17:00	Taferner (yellow card) 22'; Müller (yellow card) 44'; Sulzbacher (yellow card) 57'; Gugganig (yellow card) 83'	Report	Lichtenberger (yellow card) 9'; Jovičić (yellow card) 55'; Rosenberger (yellow card) 70'; Lang (yellow card) 74'	Stadium: Tivoli Stadion Tirol; Attendance: 2,118; Referee: Harald Lechner

17 August 2024 3	Grazer AK	2–2	FC Blau-Weiß Linz	Graz
17:00	Cipot (yellow card) 32', (goal) 60'; Lichtenberger (yellow card) 53'; Filipović 73'; Zaizen (yellow card) 88'	Report	Ronivaldo 10'; Dobras 41'; Mensah (yellow card) 72'	Stadium: Merkur-Arena; Attendance: 7,287; Referee: Sebastian Gishamer

25 August 2024 4	Wolfsberger AC	4–2	Grazer AK	Wolfsberg
17:00	Jašić (yellow card) 10'; Zukić (yellow card) 28'; Baumgartner 35', (yellow card) 54'; Ullmann (yellow card) 52'; Ballo (yellow card) 58', (goal) 60'; Kojzek 65', 73'	Report	Lang 81'; Cheukoua 82'; Dressel (yellow card) 90+3'	Stadium: Lavanttal-Arena; Attendance: 4,948; Referee: Florian Jäger

31 August 2024 5	TSV Hartberg	1–1	Grazer AK	Hartberg
17:00	Italiano 58' (o.g.); Komposch (yellow card) 84'	Report	Schriebl (yellow card) 39'; Zaizen 40'; Jovičić (yellow card) 73'; Lang (yellow card) 79'	Stadium: Profertil Arena Hartberg; Attendance: 4,187; Referee: Walter Altmann

15 September 2024 6	Grazer AK	1–1	SCR Altach	Graz
14:30	Cipot (yellow card) 19'; Lichtenberger 20'; Jovičić (yellow card) 58'; Filipović (yellow card) 90'	Report	Gustavo 4'; Koller (yellow card) 10'; Demaku (yellow card) 62'; Ingolitsch (yellow card) 81'	Stadium: Merkur-Arena; Attendance: 6,643; Referee: Christopher Jäger

21 September 2024 7	LASK	4–2	Grazer AK	Linz
17:00	Berisha 14'; Ljubičić 22' (pen.), 64'; Jovičić (yellow card) 45+1'; Taoui (yellow card) 57', (goal) 90+5'; Bello (yellow card) 58'; Talovierov (yellow card) 70'	Report	Vučić 30'; Lichtenberger 51'; Schriebl (yellow card) 87'	Stadium: Raiffeisen Arena; Attendance: 12,975; Referee: Julian Weinberger

29 September 2024 8	Grazer AK	0–1	SK Austria Klagenfurt	Graz
17:00	Zaizen (yellow card) 86'; Cheukoua (yellow card) 88'; Dressel (yellow card) 90+5'	Report	Cvetko (yellow card) 29'; Robatsch 34'; Salifou (yellow card) 90+1'; Wernitznig (yellow card) 90+4'	Stadium: Merkur-Arena; Attendance: 6,967; Referee: Harald Lechner

5 October 2024 9	FK Austria Wien	2–1	Grazer AK	Vienna
17:00	Fitz 24' (pen.); Lucas Galvão (yellow card) 28'; Malone (yellow card) 36'; Graf 69' (o.g.); Pérez Vinlöf (yellow card) 73'	Report	Gantschnig (yellow card) 23'; Dressel (yellow card) 26'; Schriebl (yellow card) 49'; Lucas Galvão 52' (o.g.); Italiano (yellow card) 65'; Satin (yellow card) 68'; Filipović (yellow card) 90+6' (yellow-red card) 90+8'	Stadium: Generali Arena; Attendance: 13,222; Referee: Florian Jäger

19 October 2024 10	SK Sturm Graz	5–2	Grazer AK	Graz
17:00	Geyrhofer (yellow card) 23'; Gazibegović 34', (yellow card) 34'; Kiteishvili 40', 80'; Yalcouyé (yellow card) 46'; Biereth 50'; Jatta 65'	Report	Graf (yellow card) 12'; Jovičić (yellow card) 25'; Maderner (yellow card) 33', (goal) 54'; Cipot (yellow card) 54'; Rosenberger 56', (yellow card) 60'; Cheukoua (yellow card) 61'	Stadium: Merkur-Arena; Attendance: 14,029; Referee: Alexander Harkam

27 October 2024 11	Grazer AK	1–1	SK Rapid Wien	Graz
14:30	Perchtold (yellow card) 13'; Rosenberger (yellow card) 35'; Lichtenberger 69', (yellow card) 90+5'; Satin (yellow card) 90+2'; Meierhofer (yellow card) 90+2'	Report	Kaygin (yellow card) 65'; Beljo 90+3' (pen.)	Stadium: Merkur-Arena; Attendance: 10,651; Referee: Daniel Pfister

2 November 2024 12	Red Bull Salzburg	0–0	Grazer AK	Wals-Siezenheim
17:00	Gadou (red card) 43'; Capaldo (yellow card) 48'; Clark (yellow card) 69'; Bajcetic (yellow card) 76'	Report	Gantschnig (yellow card) 19'; Rosenberger (yellow card) 24'; Vučić (yellow card) 84'	Stadium: Red Bull Arena; Attendance: 13,551; Referee: Julian Weinberger

9 November 2024 13	Grazer AK	2–1	WSG Tirol	Graz
17:00	Maderner 9'; Perchtold (yellow card) 40'; Lawrence 77' (o.g.); Gantschnig (yellow card) 86'	Report	Müller (yellow card) 5'; Jaunegg (yellow card) 33'; Anselm 60'; Skrbo (yellow card) 89'; Eckmayr (red card) 90'	Stadium: Merkur-Arena; Attendance: 6,808; Referee: Alain Sadikovski

24 November 2024 14	FC Blau-Weiß Linz	1–2	Grazer AK	Linz
14:30	Goiginger 30'; Seidl (yellow card) 40'; Diabate (yellow card) 45+2'; Noß (yellow card) 90'	Report	Lichtenberger 41'; Cipot 48'; Jovičić (red card) 60'; Italiano (yellow card) 66'; Rosenberger (yellow card) 90+2'	Stadium: Hofmann Personal Stadion; Attendance: 5,514; Referee: Emil Ristoskov

30 November 2024 15	Grazer AK	3–4	Wolfsberger AC	Graz
17:00	Maderner 8', (yellow card) 86'; Cipot 11', (yellow card) 42'; Perchtold (red card) 27'; Gantschnig 36'; Filipović (yellow card) 71' (yellow-red card) 89'; Frieser (yellow card) 82'; Italiano (yellow card) 87'	Report	Ballo (yellow card) 31'; Wimmer (yellow card) 71'; Atanga 80'; Gattermayer 84', 90+8'; Lang 90+2' (o.g.)	Stadium: Merkur-Arena; Attendance: 7,686; Referee: Isa Simsek

8 December 2024 16	Grazer AK	0–3	TSV Hartberg	Graz
14:30	Kreuzriegler (yellow card) 28'; Rosenberger (yellow card) 58'; Jovičić (yellow card) 62'; Maderner (yellow card) 64'; Lang (yellow card) 90+5' (yellow-red card) 90+5'	Report	Demir (yellow card) 25' (yellow-red card) 90+1'; Mijić 36'; Pfeifer (yellow card) 52'; Prokop 60' (pen.); Omoregie (yellow card) 82'; Avdijaj 84'	Stadium: Merkur-Arena; Attendance: 6,905; Referee: Christopher Jäger

8 February 2025 17	SCR Altach	1–2	Grazer AK	Altach
17:00	Noode (yellow card) 36'; Milojević (yellow card) 73'; Gorgon (red card) 80'; Mustapha 82'	Report	Filipović (yellow card) 45+1'; Graf (yellow card) 45+2'; Maderner 61'; Italiano 75'	Stadium: Stadion Schnabelholz; Referee: Stefan Ebner

16 February 2025 18	Grazer AK	0–0	LASK	Graz
14:30	Jano (yellow card) 84'; Tikvić (yellow card) 87'; Kleinheisler (yellow card) 90+3'	Report	Bogarde (yellow card) 22'; Ljubić (yellow card) 58'; Adeniran (yellow card) 80'; Jovičić (yellow card) 90+3'	Stadium: Merkur-Arena; Attendance: 4,197; Referee: Christopher Jäger

22 February 2024 19	Austria Klagenfurt	4–2	Grazer AK	Klagenfurt
17:00	Wernitznig 12'; Cvetko (yellow card) 34'; Gkezos (yellow card) 58'; Salifou 60'; Bobzien 78', 90+4' (pen.)	Report	Fofana (yellow card) 27'; Schriebl (yellow card) 56' (yellow-red card) 90+2'; Maderner 62'; Kreuzriegler (yellow card) 64'; Jano 73'; Kleinheisler (yellow card) 77'	Stadium: Wörthersee Stadion; Referee: Sebastian Gishamer

1 March 2025 20	Grazer AK	1–2	FK Austria Wien	Graz
17:00	Lichtenberger (yellow card) 19'; Satin (yellow card) 45+2'; Graf (yellow card) 48'; Rosenberger (yellow card) 74'; Cipot 90+1'; Kleinheisler (yellow card) 90+2'	Report	Fitz 56' (pen.); Malone 61'; Guenouche (yellow card) 73'	Stadium: Merkur-Arena; Attendance: 7,597; Referee: Markus Hameter

9 March 2025 21	Grazer AK	1–2	SK Sturm Graz	Graz
17:00	Schriebl (yellow card) 9'; Lichtenberger (yellow card) 33'; Maderner (yellow card) 45'; Tikvić (yellow card) 66'; Perchtold 79', (yellow card) 79' (yellow-red card) 88'	Report	Chukwuani (yellow card) 81'; Kiteishvili 86'; Yalcouyé 90+2', (yellow card) 90+3'	Stadium: Merkur-Arena; Attendance: 13,900; Referee: Harald Lechner

16 March 2025 22	SK Rapid Wien	3–0	Grazer AK	Vienna
17:00	Cvetković 23'; Beljo 33' (pen.), (yellow card) 60'; Jansson 44'	Report	Jano (yellow card) 18'; Fofana (yellow card) 58'; Tikvić (yellow card) 82'	Stadium: Allianz Stadion; Attendance: 21,681; Referee: Stefan Ebner

==== League table ====
Pos	Team	Pld	W	D	L	GF	GA	GD	Pts	Qualification
2	TSV Hartberg	32	11	11	10	40	40	0	31	Qualification for the Conference League play-offs
3	WSG Tirol	32	7	9	16	35	50	−15	20	
4	Grazer AK	32	5	13	14	34	54	−20	20	
5	Rheindorf Altach	32	5	11	16	29	46	−17	18	
6	Austria Klagenfurt (R)	32	6	9	17	33	70	−37	16	Relegation to Austrian Football Second League

Source: Austrian Football Bundesliga
Rules for classification: 1) Points; 2) Points with (possible) half points subtracted due to rounding; 3) Head-to-head points; 4) Head-to-head goal difference; 5) Head-to-head goals scored; 6) Goal difference; 7) Goals scored; 8) Matches won; 9) Away matches won; 10) Away goals scored.
(R) Relegated

==== Results by round ====
Round	1	2	3	4	5	6	7	8	9	10
Ground	H	A	H	A	H	A	H	A	H	A
Result										
Position										

Source: Austrian Football Bundesliga
A = Away; H = Home; W = Win; D = Draw; L = Loss

==== Matches ====
29 March 2025 23	Grazer AK	0–0	WSG Tirol	Graz
17:00	Frieser (yellow card) 12'; Maderner (yellow card) 56'; Fofana (yellow card) 85'; Schiestl (red card) 90'; Kleinheisler (yellow card) 90+2'	Report	Butler (yellow card) 52'; Lawrence (yellow card) 88'; Taferner (yellow card) 90'	Stadium: Merkur-Arena; Attendance: 6,623; Referee: Josef Spurny

5 April 2025 24	LASK	1–0	Grazer AK	Linz
17:00	Bogarde (yellow card) 29' (yellow-red card) 84'; M. Jovičić 72' (o.g.); Cisse (yellow card) 77'; B. Jovičić (yellow card) 84'; Flecker (yellow card) 90+2'	Report	Kreuzriegler (yellow card) 35'	Stadium: Raiffeisen Arena; Attendance: 9,502; Referee: Daniel Pfister

12 April 2025 25	Grazer AK	1–0	SCR Altach	Graz
17:00	Maderner 34' (pen.), (yellow card) 81'; Jano (yellow card) 53'; Jovičić (yellow card) 77'	Report	Kameri (yellow card) 17'; Gorgon (yellow card) 24'; Stojanović (yellow card) 32'; Bähre (yellow card) 78'	Stadium: Merkur-Arena; Attendance: 7,400; Referee: Julian Weinberger

19 April 2025 26	Austria Klagenfurt	0–0	Grazer AK	Klagenfurt
17:00	Wernitznig (yellow card) 51'; Hinteregger (yellow card) 62'; Mahrer (yellow card) 83'	Report	Fofana (yellow card) 65'; Tikvić (yellow card) 76'	Stadium: Wörthersee Stadion; Attendance: 3,833; Referee: Harald Lechner

22 April 2025 27	Grazer AK	0–3	TSV Hartberg	Graz
18:30	Jovičić (yellow card) 37'; Satin (yellow card) 60'; Schriebl (red card) 82'	Report	Omoregie (yellow card) 22'; Mijić 58', 90+8'; Avdijaj 70'; Sallinger (yellow card) 90'	Stadium: Merkur-Arena; Attendance: 7,202; Referee: Alain Sadikovski

25 April 2025 28	TSV Hartberg	1–1	Grazer AK	Hartberg
19:30	Prokop 9'	Report	Cipot 36'; Lichtenberger (yellow card) 45+2'	Stadium: Profertil Arena Hartberg; Attendance: 3,272; Referee: Josef Spurny

2 May 2025 29	Grazer AK	1–1	Austria Klagenfurt	Graz
19:30	Maderner 34'; Fofana (yellow card) 84'	Report	Koch (yellow card) 27'; Binder 37'; Kitz (red card) 49'; Hinteregger (yellow card) 84'	Stadium: Merkur-Arena; Attendance: 8,352; Referee: Arnes Talic

10 May 2025 30	SCR Altach	2–2	Grazer AK	Altach
17:00	Bähre 26' (pen.); Diawara 56'	Report	Lichtenberger 29'; Cipot 61'	Stadium: Stadion Schnabelholz; Attendance: 8,057; Referee: Sebastian Gishamer

17 May 2025 31	Grazer AK	1–0	LASK	Graz
17:00	Fofana (yellow card) 59'; Cipot 72'	Report	Andrade (red card) 14'; Flecker (yellow card) 18'; Smolčić (yellow card) 66'; Coulibaly (yellow card) 76'; Adeniran (yellow card) 90+2'	Stadium: Merkur-Arena; Attendance: 9,703; Referee: Christopher Jäger

23 May 2025 32	WSG Tirol	1–1	Grazer AK	Innsbruck
19:30	Skrbo 29'; Taferner (yellow card) 71'	Report	Tikvić (yellow card) 21'; Frieser 25'	Stadium: Tivoli Stadion Tirol; Attendance: Julian Weinberger; Referee: 2,150

=== Austrian Cup ===
26 July 2024 First round	ATUS Fliesen Koller Velden	2–2 (a.e.t.) (3–4 p)	Grazer AK	Villach
18:00	Nicolas Manuel Modritz 6'; Marlon Winter 54'	Report	Rosenberger 66'; Frieser 75'	Stadium: Stadion Villach/Lind; Attendance: 1,500; Referee: Jäger Florian

28 August 2024 Second round	SVG Reichenau	0–9	Grazer AK	Innsbruck
17:30	Hupfauf (yellow card) 13'; Kleinlercher (yellow card) 38'; Abali (yellow card) 46'	Report	Cheukoua 3', 22', 58'; Vučić 6'; Schiestl (yellow card) 35', (goal) 49'; Zaizen 58'; Schriebl 67'; Lichtenberger 69'; Frieser 74'; Gantschnig 87'	Stadium: Kunstrasen Reichenau; Attendance: 643; Referee: Stefan Macanovic

30 October 2024 Third round	SW Bregenz	2–1	Grazer AK	Bregenz
19:00	Renan Peixoto 7', (yellow card) 90+1'; Kmjić (yellow card) 31'; Tiefenbach (yellow card) 32'; Vucenovic 79', (yellow card) 79'; Tartarotti (yellow card) 90+3'; Gschossmann (yellow card) 90+5'	Report	Frieser (yellow card) 54'; Maderner 75'; Gantschnig (yellow card) 76'; Cipot (yellow card) 85'	Stadium: ImmoAgentur Stadion; Attendance: 1,200; Referee: Stjepan Bosnjak

== Statistics ==
=== Appearances and goals ===
As of match played 23 May 2025

Players with no appearances are not included on the list
Italics indicate a loaned in player

No.	Pos	Nat	Player	Total		Bundesliga		Austrian Cup	
No.	Pos	Nat	Player	Apps	Goals	Apps	Goals	Apps	Goals
1	GK	(Austria) AUT	Jakob Meierhofer	19	0	17+0	0	2+0	0
3	DF	(Croatia) CRO	Antonio Tikvić	15	0	13+2	0	0+0	0
4	DF	(Austria) AUT	Martin Kreuzriegler	14	0	8+4	0	2+0	0
5	DF	(Croatia) CRO	Petar Filipović	27	1	26+0	1	1+0	0
6	MF	(Togo) TOG	Sadik Fofana	14	0	13+1	0	0+0	0
7	MF	(Austria) AUT	Murat Satin	31	0	23+6	0	1+1	0
8	MF	(Hungary) HUN	Laszlo Kleinheisler	13	0	4+9	0	0+0	0
9	FW	(Austria) AUT	Daniel Maderner	30	8	21+7	7	1+1	1
10	MF	(Austria) AUT	Christian Lichtenberger	34	6	24+7	5	1+2	1
11	MF	(Slovenia) SLO	Tio Cipot	29	6	17+10	6	1+1	0
12	FW	(Austria) AUT	Romeo Vučić	20	3	8+9	2	2+1	1
13	MF	(Austria) AUT	Marco Perchtold	23	1	13+8	1	1+1	0
14	DF	(Australia) AUS	Jacob Italiano	30	1	17+11	1	1+1	0
15	DF	(Austria) AUT	Lukas Graf	16	0	11+2	0	1+2	0
17	MF	(Austria) AUT	Thomas Schiestl	7	1	3+3	0	1+0	1
18	MF	(Austria) AUT	Zeteny Jano	14	1	9+5	1	0+0	0
19	DF	(Austria) AUT	Marco Gantschnig	18	2	8+7	1	3+0	1
20	MF	(Austria) AUT	Thorsten Schriebl	25	1	10+12	0	3+0	1
24	MF	(Austria) AUT	Tobias Revelant	2	0	0+2	0	0+0	0
26	GK	(Austria) AUT	Christoph Nicht	1	0	0+0	0	1+0	0
27	DF	(Austria) AUT	Benjamin Rosenberger	28	2	18+8	1	2+0	1
28	FW	(Austria) AUT	Dominik Frieser	32	3	26+3	1	1+2	2
30	DF	(Austria) AUT	Miloš Jovičić	27	0	25+0	0	1+1	0
44	GK	(Austria) AUT	Florian Wiegele	15	0	15+0	0	0+0	0
Player(s) who featured whilst on loan but returned to parent club during the season:
8	MF	(Austria) AUT	Gabriel Zirngast	1	0	0+0	0	0+1	0
Player(s) who featured but departed the club permanently during the season:
22	DF	(Austria) AUT	Felix Holzhacker	2	0	0+1	0	0+1	0
24	MF	(Germany) GER	Dennis Dressel	15	0	9+5	0	1+0	0
99	FW	(Cameroon) CMR	Michael Cheukoua	12	4	2+7	1	2+1	3
Player(s) who featured but departed the club on loan during the season:
18	FW	(Japan) JPN	Atsushi Zaizen	14	1	3+9	1	1+1	0
21	DF	(Austria) AUT	Michael Lang	17	2	11+3	2	3+0	0
