= 2023–24 Grazer AK season =

Grazer AK
2023–24 season
- Manager: Gernot Messner
- Stadium: Merkur-Arena
- 2. Liga: 1st
- Austrian Cup: Third round
- Top goalscorer: League: Daniel Maderner (7); All: Daniel Maderner (8)

The 2023–24 season is Grazer AK's 122nd season in existence and fifth consecutive in the 2. Liga, the second division of Austrian football. They also compete in the Austrian Cup.

== Players ==
=== First-team squad ===
As of 11 July, 2023

Note: Flags indicate national team as defined under FIFA eligibility rules; some limited exceptions apply. Players may hold more than one non-FIFA nationality.

No.	Pos.	Nation	Player
1	GK	AUT	Jakob Meierhofer
5	DF	GER	Yannick Oberleitner
6	MF	AUT	Markus Rusek
7	MF	JPN	Atsushi Zaizen
9	FW	AUT	Daniel Maderner
10	MF	AUT	Christian Lichtenberger
11	MF	GEO	Levan Eloshvili
13	MF	AUT	Marco Perchtold (captain)
15	DF	AUT	Lukas Graf
16	MF	AUT	Thomas Mayer
17	MF	AUT	Thomas Schiestl
18	DF	AUT	Sebastian Jost
19	DF	AUT	Marco Gantschnig

No.	Pos.	Nation	Player
20	MF	AUT	Thorsten Schriebl
21	MF	AUT	Michael Lang
22	DF	AUT	Felix Holzhacker
23	MF	AUT	Paolo Jager
24	DF	AUT	Felix Köchl
26	GK	AUT	Christoph Nicht
27	DF	AUT	Benjamin Rosenberger
30	DF	AUT	Miloš Jovičić
31	GK	SWE	Haris Mujanic
32	MF	AUT	Martin Murg
33	GK	AUT	Maximilian Fahler
70	FW	AUT	Jan Stefanon
99	FW	CMR	Michael Cheukoua

=== Out on loan ===
Note: Flags indicate national team as defined under FIFA eligibility rules; some limited exceptions apply. Players may hold more than one non-FIFA nationality.

No.	Pos.	Nation	Player
—	MF	AUT	Lukas Alterdinger (at Grödig)

No.	Pos.	Nation	Player
—	FW	CRO	Filip Smoljan (at SC Kalsdorf)
—	FW	AUT	Paul Kiedl (at SC Kalsdorf)

== Transfers ==
=== In ===
Pos.	Player	Transferred from	Fee	Date	Source

=== Out ===
Pos.	Player	Transferred to	Fee	Date	Source

== Pre-season and friendlies ==
Win Draw Loss Fixtures

24 June 2024 Friendly	SV Wildon (Austria)	1–4	(Austria) Grazer AK
18:30

30 June 2024 Roland Sulzbacher Tournament	Hartberg (Austria)	0–0	(Austria) Grazer AK
19:15
Note: 45-minutes match.

30 June 2024 Roland Sulzbacher Tournament	Grazer AK (Austria)	1–0	(Austria) FC Gleisdorf 09
20:00	Peham 8'
Note: 45-minutes match.

15 July 2023 Friendly	Grazer AK (Austria)	1–4	(Ukraine) Polissya Zhytomyr	Graz
11:00 CEST (UTC+2)				Stadium: Sportzentrum Graz-Weinzödl

8 September 2023 Friendly	Austria Klagenfurt	4–2	(Austria) Grazer AK	Klagenfurt am Wörthersee
15:00 CEST (UTC+2)				Stadium: Sportplatz Viktring

17 November 2023 Friendly	Weiz (Austria)	1–5	(Austria) Grazer AK

13 January 2024 Friendly	Fürstenfeld (Austria)	0–6	(Austria) Grazer AK
15:00			Milla 24', 26'; Jastremski 46', 54', 74', 87'

== Competitions ==
=== Overall record ===
Competition	First match	Last match	Starting round	Final position	Record							
Competition	First match	Last match	Starting round	Final position	Pld	W	D	L	GF	GA	GD	Win %
2. Liga	28 July 2023	26 May 2024	Matchday 1		15	12	1	2	28	14	+14	80.00
Austrian Cup	22 July 2023	2 November 2023	First round	Third round	3	2	0	1	8	6	+2	66.67
Total					18	14	1	3	36	20	+16	77.78

Last updated: December 2023
Source: Soccerway

=== 2. Liga ===
==== League table ====
Pos	Team	Pld	W	D	L	GF	GA	GD	Pts	Promotion or relegation
1	Grazer AK (C, P)	30	21	6	3	57	27	+30	69	Promotion to 2024–25 Austrian Football Bundesliga
2	Guntamatic Ried	30	18	5	7	67	22	+45	59	
3	First Vienna FC	30	15	6	9	52	39	+13	51	
4	DSV Leoben (Note: DSV Leoben was not granted admission to the 2nd division in the first and second instance. The club then appealed to the league's permanent neutral arbitration tribunal, where it also failed. As no other club from the Regionalliga West that had applied for a second division licence was granted, Amstetten remained in the league and the number of relegated teams was reduced to two. Dornbirn also failed to gain admission to the 2nd division and was relegated together with Leoben.) (R)	30	15	6	9	47	31	+16	51	Relegation to 2024–25 Austrian Football Regionalliga
5	Floridsdorfer AC	30	13	10	7	45	33	+12	49	

Source: 2.Liga Table
Rules for classification: 1) Points; 2) Direct Duel; 3) Goal difference; 4) Goals scored; 5) Matches won; 6) Away matches won; 7) Away goals scored
(C) Champions; (P) Promoted; (R) Relegated

==== Results summary ====
Overall								Home						Away					
Pld	W	D	L	GF	GA	GD	Pts	W	D	L	GF	GA	GD	W	D	L	GF	GA	GD
0	0	0	0	0	0	0	0	0	0	0	0	0	0	0	0	0	0	0	0

Last updated: August 2023.

==== Results by round ====
Round	1
Ground	
Result	
Position	

Updated to match(es) played on August 2023. Source:
A = Away; H = Home; W = Win; D = Draw; L = Loss

==== Matches ====
The league fixtures were unveiled on 27 June 2023.

=== Austrian Cup ===
22 July 2023 First round	Bad Gleichenberg	2–4	Grazer AK	Bad Gleichenberg
20:30 CEST (UTC+2)	Gantschnig 2' (o.g.); Schleich 81'	Report	Rosenberger 11'; Maderner 32'; Lang 40'; Lichtenberger 48'	Stadium: Bad Gleichenberg Arena; Referee: Harald Lechner
