= List of Austrian football transfers summer 2025 =

This is a list of Austrian football transfers for the 2025 summer transfer window. Only transfers featuring Austrian Football Bundesliga are listed.

== Austrian Football Bundesliga ==
Note: Flags indicate national team as has been defined under FIFA eligibility rules. Players may hold more than one non-FIFA nationality.

=== Sturm Graz ===
In:

No.	Pos.	Nation	Player
1	GK	DEN	Oliver Christensen (on loan from (Italy) Fiorentina, previously on loan at (Italy) Salernitana)
5	DF	GER	Tim Oermann (on loan from (Germany) Bayer Leverkusen)
8	MF	POL	Filip Rózga (from (Poland) Cracovia)
11	FW	COD	Axel Kayombo (from (Switzerland) Basel, previously on loan at (Switzerland) Stade Lausanne Ouchy)
22	MF	DEN	Julius Beck (from (Denmark) Esbjerg)

Out:

No.	Pos.	Nation	Player
1	GK	NED	Kjell Scherpen (loan return to (England) Brighton & Hove Albion)
5	DF	SUI	Gregory Wüthrich (to (Switzerland) Young Boys)
14	MF	CRO	Lovro Zvonarek (loan return to (Germany) Bayern Munich)
30	MF	HUN	Martin Kern (to (Hungary) Puskás Akadémia)
36	FW	MLI	Amady Camara (on loan to (France) Nantes)
—	FW	POL	Szymon Włodarczyk (on loan to (Netherlands) Excelsior, previously on loan at (Italy) Salernitana)
—	DF	MLI	Amadou Dante (to (Portugal) Arouca, previously on loan)
—	FW	CPV	Bryan Teixeira (free agent, previously on loan at (Germany) 1. FC Magdeburg)

=== Red Bull Salzburg ===
In:

No.	Pos.	Nation	Player
2	DF	DEN	Jacob Rasmussen (from (Denmark) Brøndby)
8	MF	JPN	Sōta Kitano (from (Japan) Cerezo Osaka)
13	DF	GER	Frans Krätzig (from (Germany) Bayern Munich, previously on loan at (Germany) 1. FC Heidenheim)
22	DF	AUT	Stefan Lainer (from (Germany) Borussia Mönchengladbach)
27	FW	BIH	Kerim Alajbegović (from (Germany) Bayer Leverkusen youth)
91	DF	JPN	Anrie Chase (from (Germany) VfB Stuttgart)
—	MF	SVN	Miha Matjašec (from (Slovenia) Domžale youth)
—	MF	COL	Mayker Palacios (from (Colombia) AAF Popayán)

Out:

No.	Pos.	Nation	Player
1	GK	GER	Janis Blaswich (loan return to (Germany) RB Leipzig)
2	DF	BEL	Maximiliano Caufriez (loan return to (France) Clermont)
4	DF	GER	Hendry Blank (on loan to (Germany) Hannover 96)
6	DF	AUT	Samson Baidoo (to (France) Lens)
7	MF	ARG	Nicolás Capaldo (to (Germany) Hamburger SV)
10	MF	ENG	Bobby Clark (on loan to (England) Derby County)
29	DF	MLI	Daouda Guindo (free agent)
30	MF	ISR	Oscar Gloukh (to (Netherlands) Ajax)
39	DF	GER	Leandro Morgalla (on loan to (Germany) VfL Bochum)
45	FW	MLI	Dorgeles Nene (to (Turkey) Fenerbahçe)
—	MF	SVN	Miha Matjašec (on loan to Liefering)
—	MF	COL	Mayker Palacios (on loan to Liefering)
—	FW	MLI	Gaoussou Diakité (on loan to (Switzerland) Lausanne-Sport, previously on loan at Liefering)
—	MF	NGA	Samson Tijani (to (Czech Republic) Dukla Prague)
—	GK	GER	Jonas Krumrey (to (Germany) Holstein Kiel, previously on loan at (Denmark) Lyngby)
—	DF	BIH	Amar Dedić (to (Portugal) Benfica, previously on loan at (France) Marseille)
—	DF	AUT	Raphael Hofer (to (Slovenia) Mura, previously on loan at TSV Hartberg)
—	DF	SUI	Bryan Okoh (to (Switzerland) Lausanne-Sport, previously on loan at Liefering)
—	MF	GHA	Lawrence Agyekum (to (Belgium) Cercle Brugge, previously on loan)
—	MF	AUT	Dijon Kameri (to (Poland) Cracovia, previously on loan at SCR Altach)
—	FW	AUT	Luka Reischl (to (Netherlands) ADO Den Haag, previously on loan)
—	FW	ITA	Nicolò Turco (free agent, previously on loan at (Italy) Milan Futuro)

=== Austria Wien ===
In:

No.	Pos.	Nation	Player
9	FW	AUS	Noah Botic (from (Australia) Western United)
11	FW	AUT	Manprit Sarkaria (from (China) Shenzhen Peng City)
14	FW	GHA	Kelvin Boateng (from First Vienna)
16	MF	KOR	Lee Kang-hee (from (South Korea) Gyeongnam)
17	DF	KOR	Lee Tae-seok (from (South Korea) Pohang Steelers)
19	FW	GER	Johannes Eggestein (from (Germany) FC St. Pauli)
77	FW	GER	Maurice Malone (from (Switzerland) Basel, previously on loan)

Out

No.	Pos.	Nation	Player
3	DF	BRA	Lucas Galvão (to (United Arab Emirates) Hatta Club)
11	FW	SVN	Nik Prelec (loan return to (Italy) Cagliari)
17	FW	AUT	Andreas Gruber (to (Slovakia) Dunajská Streda)
18	DF	SWE	Matteo Pérez Vinlöf (loan return to (Germany) Bayern Munich II)
19	MF	AUT	Marvin Potzmann (to Bad Waltersdorf)
36	MF	AUT	Dominik Fitz (to (United States) Minnesota United)
37	MF	AUT	Moritz Wels (on loan to WSG Tirol)
—	FW	AUT	Muharem Husković (on loan to Blau-Weiß Linz, previously on loan at TSV Hartberg)
—	DF	AUT	Tobias Polz (to SV Oberwart, previously on loan at Union Mauer)
—	DF	AUT	Matteo Meisl (to Admira Wacker, previously on loan at SV Stripfing)
—	DF	NGA	David Ewemade (to (Serbia) Radnički Niš, previously on loan at SV Stripfing)
—	MF	AUT	Dario Kreiker (to SV Stripfing, previously on loan)

=== Wolfsberg ===
In:

No.	Pos.	Nation	Player
10	FW	KOS	Donis Avdijaj (from TSV Hartberg)
25	DF	CIV	Adama Dramé (from (Slovakia) Žilina)
30	MF	AUT	Marco Sulzner (from LASK)
31	DF	AUT	Fabian Wohlmuth (from SV Ried)
35	DF	NGA	Emmanuel Chukwu (on loan from (Germany) TSG Hoffenheim II)
77	DF	AUT	Rene Renner (from (Thailand) Buriram United)

Out:

No.	Pos.	Nation	Player
3	DF	AUT	Jonathan Scherzer (to SV Ried)
9	FW	CIV	Sankara Karamoko (on loan to (Serbia) IMT)
10	FW	AUT	Thomas Sabitzer (to WSG Tirol)
14	MF	AUT	Pascal Müller (to Hertha Wels)
44	MF	AUT	Ervin Omić (to (Poland) Wisła Kraków)
77	MF	AUT	Maximilian Scharfetter (to SKU Amstetten)
97	MF	AUT	Adis Jašić (to (United Arab Emirates) Al Ain)

=== Rapid Wien ===
In:

No.	Pos.	Nation	Player
9	FW	AUT	Ercan Kara (from (Turkey) Samsunspor, previously on loan)
10	FW	NOR	Petter Nosa Dahl (from (Belgium) Mechelen)
14	MF	CMR	Martin Ndzie (from (Israel) Ashdod)
24	DF	MAD	Jean Marcelin (from (Israel) Beitar Jerusalem)
38	DF	GER	Jannes Horn (from (Germany) 1. FC Nürnberg, previously on loan at (United States) St. Louis City)
41	FW	AUT	Dominik Weixelbraun (from SKU Amstetten)
49	FW	MNE	Andrija Radulović (from (Serbia) Vojvodina, previously on loan)
71	FW	FRA	Claudy Mbuyi (from SKN St. Pölten)
90	FW	FRA	Janis Antiste (on loan from (Italy) Sassuolo, previously on loan at (Germany) 1. FC Nürnberg)

Out:

No.	Pos.	Nation	Player
3	DF	AUT	Benjamin Böckle (on loan to WSG Tirol)
5	MF	AUT	Roman Kerschbaum (free agent)
7	FW	CRO	Dion Drena Beljo (loan return to (Germany) FC Augsburg)
9	FW	AUT	Guido Burgstaller (retired)
17	MF	MLI	Mamadou Sangaré (to (France) Lens)
22	FW	SWE	Isak Jansson (to (France) Nice)
53	DF	AUT	Dominic Vincze (on loan to TSV Hartberg)
66	FW	AUT	Furkan Dursun (on loan to SKN St. Pölten)
—	MF	TUR	Dennis Kaygin (to (Germany) FC Ingolstadt, previously on loan at (Netherlands) Willem II)
—	FW	BRB	Thierry Gale (to (England) Bolton Wanderers, previously on loan at (Poland) Piast Gliwice)

=== Blau-Weiß Linz ===
In:

No.	Pos.	Nation	Player
1	GK	CZE	Viktor Baier (on loan from (Czech Republic) Viktoria Plzeň)
7	FW	AUT	Jakob Knollmüller (from SV Lafnitz)
13	GK	AUT	Valentin Oelz (from Liefering)
14	MF	AUT	Christopher Cvetko (from Austria Klagenfurt)
25	FW	AUT	Muharem Husković (on loan from Austria Wien, previously on loan at Hartberg)
30	FW	SUI	Nico Maier (from (Switzerland) Wil)
—	DF	AUT	Matthias Wetschka (free agent)
—	MF	AUT	Felix Gerstmayer (from Grün-Weiß Micheldorf)

Out:

No.	Pos.	Nation	Player
1	GK	CZE	Radek Vítek (loan return to (England) Manchester United)
5	DF	SRB	Danilo Mitrović (to (Serbia) Radnički 1923)
6	MF	BRA	Lucas Dantas (to First Vienna)
7	MF	IRL	Conor Noß (to (Germany) MSV Duisburg)
12	GK	AUT	Andreas Lukse (retired)
13	FW	AUT	Alexander Schmidt (to Admira Wacker)
14	DF	AUT	Julian Gölles (to TSV Hartberg)
18	MF	MLI	Soumaila Diabate (loan return to Red Bull Salzburg)
21	GK	AUT	Bernd Aineter (to SV Lafnitz)
23	MF	AUT	Lukas Tursch (to ASKÖ Oedt)
26	DF	AUT	Lukas Ibertsberger (to Austria Lustenau)
29	FW	GER	Mehmet Ibrahimi (free agent)
30	MF	AUT	Kristijan Dobras (free agent)
—	DF	AUT	Matthias Wetschka (on loan to Union Dietach)
—	MF	AUT	Felix Gerstmayer (on loan to SV Wallern)
—	GK	AUT	Patrick Moser (to SV Wallern, previously on loan)
—	FW	AUT	Stefan Feiertag (to (Poland) Wieczysta Kraków, previously on loan at (Germany) 1. FC Saarbrücken)

=== LASK ===
In:

No.	Pos.	Nation	Player
5	MF	KOS	Art Smakaj (from (Croatia) Lokomotiva)
9	FW	CZE	Kryštof Daněk (reloan from (Czech Republic) Sparta Prague)
13	MF	NGA	Adetunji Adeshina (from (Serbia) Novi Pazar)
20	DF	DEN	Kasper Jørgensen (from (Denmark) AaB)
43	DF	BRA	Alemão (on loan from (Portugal) Portimonense)
44	MF	CRO	Lukas Kačavenda (on loan from (Croatia) Dinamo Zagreb)

Out:

No.	Pos.	Nation	Player
1	GK	AUT	Tobias Lawal (to (Belgium) Genk)
5	DF	GER	Philipp Ziereis (to (Germany) Greuther Fürth)
10	MF	AUT	Robert Žulj (to (Thailand) Buriram United)
17	DF	GER	Jérôme Boateng (free agent)
18	MF	SRB	Branko Jovičić (to (Serbia) TSC)
21	MF	AUT	Ivan Ljubić (to (Cyprus) Apollon Limassol)
22	DF	MNE	Filip Stojković (to (Thailand) Buriram United)
23	FW	GHA	Ibrahim Mustapha (to (Serbia) Vojvodina)
25	FW	FRA	Alexis Tibidi (free agent)
26	DF	CRO	Hrvoje Smolčić (loan return to (Germany) Eintracht Frankfurt)
35	DF	AUT	Marco Sulzner (to Wolfsberg)
43	GK	AUT	Clemens Steinbauer (to Admira Wacker)
44	FW	FRA	Adil Taoui (free agent)
45	MF	TUR	Enis Safin (to (Turkey) Pendikspor)
—	DF	AUT	Luca Wimhofer (to SKU Amstetten, previously on loan at SV Horn)
—	MF	AUT	Marco Schabauer (to Admira Wacker, previously on loan)
—	FW	GER	Lucas Copado (to (Germany) SC Paderborn, previously on loan at (Germany) Energie Cottbus)

=== TSV Hartberg ===
In:

No.	Pos.	Nation	Player
1	GK	AUT	Ammar Helac (from SCR Altach)
3	DF	AUT	Dominic Vincze (on loan from Rapid Wien)
5	MF	MLI	Youba Diarra (from (Spain) Cádiz, previously on loan)
6	DF	CIV	Habib Coulibaly (free agent)
16	DF	AUT	Julian Gölles (from Blau-Weiß Linz)
19	DF	AUT	Lukas Spendlhofer (from (Poland) Bruk-Bet Termalica)
20	MF	AUT	Paul Bratschko (from SC Weiz)
33	DF	GER	Maximilian Hennig (on loan from (Germany) Bayern Munich II)
40	GK	GER	Tom Ritzy Hülsmann (from (Germany) Bayern Munich II, previously on loan at SKN St. Pölten)
—	FW	AUT	Lukas Fridrikas (from SCR Altach)

Out:

No.	Pos.	Nation	Player
1	GK	AUT	Raphael Sallinger (to (Scotland) Hibernian)
6	MF	AUT	Mateo Karamatic (to (United Arab Emirates) Al-Nasr)
10	FW	KOS	Donis Avdijaj (to Wolfsberg)
16	MF	AUT	Sandro Schendl (to SV Oberwart)
19	DF	AUT	Raphael Hofer (loan return to Red Bull Salzburg)
20	DF	AUT	Manuel Pfeifer (to (Germany) 1860 Munich)
29	FW	NED	Nelson Amadin (to (Netherlands) Emmen)
33	FW	AUT	Muharem Husković (loan return to Austria Wien)

=== WSG Tirol ===
In:

No.	Pos.	Nation	Player
9	FW	ENG	Ademola Ola-Adebomi (from (England) Crystal Palace, previously on loan at (Belgium) Beveren)
10	FW	AUT	Thomas Sabitzer (from Wolfsberg)
20	DF	AUT	Benjamin Böckle (on loan from Rapid Wien)
22	MF	AUT	David Falkner (from AKA Tirol U18)
23	DF	CRO	Marco Boras (from (Croatia) Slaven Belupo)
37	MF	AUT	Moritz Wels (on loan from Austria Wien)

Out:

No.	Pos.	Nation	Player
7	FW	AUT	Stefan Skrbo (to (Slovakia) Spartak Trnava)
8	FW	MLI	Mahamadou Diarra (to (Switzerland) Wil)
10	MF	DEN	Bror Blume (to (Denmark) Lyngby)
14	MF	AUT	Alexander Ranacher (to Austria Klagenfurt)
20	MF	AUT	Cem Üstündag (to (Turkey) Kasımpaşa)
22	DF	AUT	Osarenren Okungbowa (to First Vienna)
24	DF	GER	Jonas David (to (Germany) SSV Ulm)
25	DF	GER	Lennart Czyborra (loan return to (Italy) Genoa)
31	MF	SUI	Mathew Collins (on loan to Austria Salzburg)
32	FW	CRO	Renato Babić (to SK St. Johann)

=== Grazer AK ===
In:

No.	Pos.	Nation	Player
2	DF	USA	Donovan Pines (from (England) Barnsley)
3	DF	DEN	Ludwig Vraa-Jensen (from (Denmark) Brøndby)
8	MF	AUT	Tobias Koch (from Austria Klagenfurt)
21	FW	KOS	Arbnor Prenqi (from SC Neusiedl/See)
22	FW	FRA	Ramiz Harakaté (from SKN St. Pölten)
24	MF	AUT	Tim Paumgartner (from Liefering)
25	FW	AUT	Alexander Hofleitner (from Kapfenberg)
82	DF	FRA	Beres Owusu (on loan from (France) Saint-Étienne, previously on loan at (France) Quevilly-Rouen)

Out:

No.	Pos.	Nation	Player
3	DF	CRO	Antonio Tikvić (loan return to (England) Watford)
8	MF	HUN	László Kleinheisler (free agent)
12	FW	AUT	Romeo Vučić (loan return to Austria Wien)
13	MF	AUT	Marco Perchtold (retired)
19	DF	AUT	Marco Gantschnig (on loan to Austria Klagenfurt)
27	DF	AUT	Benjamin Rosenberger (to First Vienna)
30	DF	SRB	Miloš Jovičić (free agent)
—	GK	AUT	Juri Kirchmayr (on loan to FAC, previously on loan at ASK Voitsberg)
—	DF	AUT	Moritz Eder (to Austria Salzburg, previously on loan)
—	DF	AUT	Michael Lang (to Austria Klagenfurt, previously on loan at Kapfenberger SV)
—	FW	CMR	Kevin-Prince Milla (to (Czech Republic) Dukla Prague, previously on loan)
—	FW	JPN	Atsushi Zaizen (to SW Bregenz, previously on loan at ASK Voitsberg)
—	FW	AUT	Max Rauter (to Deutschlandsberger SC, previously on loan at SV Tillmitsch)

=== SCR Altach ===
In:

No.	Pos.	Nation	Player
18	MF	AUT	Patrick Greil (from (Germany) SV Sandhausen)
28	MF	FRA	Yann Massombo (from (France) Clermont, previously on loan at (Switzerland) Biel-Bienne)
31	GK	AUT	Daniel Antosch (from (Cyprus) Nea Salamis Famagusta)

Out:

No.	Pos.	Nation	Player
2	DF	CMR	Steve Noode (loan return to (Germany) Schalke 04)
9	FW	GER	Florian Dietz (loan return to (Germany) 1. FC Köln)
11	FW	AUT	Lukas Fridrikas (to TSV Hartberg)
13	MF	CMR	Djawal Kaiba (to (Switzerland) Wil)
16	FW	AUT	Damian Maksimović (to SW Bregenz)
21	GK	AUT	Ammar Helac (to TSV Hartberg)
27	MF	AUT	Christian Gebauer (free agent)
30	MF	AUT	Lukas Fadinger (to (Scotland) Motherwell)
37	MF	AUT	Dijon Kameri (loan return to Red Bull Salzburg)
—	FW	FRA	Sofian Bahloul (to (Switzerland) Aarau, previously on loan)

=== SV Ried ===
In:

No.	Pos.	Nation	Player
3	DF	AUT	Jonathan Scherzer (from Wolfsberg)
6	MF	RSA	Yusuf Maart (from (South Africa) Kaizer Chiefs)
7	FW	ZAM	Kingstone Mutandwa (on loan from (Italy) Cagliari)
11	FW	ESP	Ekain Azkune (on loan from (Spain) Athletic Bilbao B)
13	FW	AUT	Peter Kiedl (on loan from Sturm Graz II)
20	MF	AUT	Nevio Zotz (from AKA Tirol)
24	MF	AUT	Christopher Wernitznig (from Austria Klagenfurt)
25	DF	AUT	Dominik Kirnbauer (from ASK Voitsberg)

Out:

No.	Pos.	Nation	Player
7	MF	SVN	Nik Marinšek (to Austria Klagenfurt)
14	DF	AUT	Marco Untergrabner (to FAC)
16	DF	AUT	Benjamin Sammer (on loan to Hertha Wels)
19	FW	AUT	David Burger (to Rapid Wien II)
28	FW	CIV	Wilfried Eza (to (Russia) Chelyabinsk)
31	DF	AUT	Fabian Wohlmuth (to Wolfsberg)

== See also ==
- 2025–26 Austrian Football Bundesliga
