= List of Austrian football transfers winter 2024–25 =

This is a list of Austrian football transfers for the 2024–25 winter transfer window. Only transfers featuring Austrian Football Bundesliga are listed.

== Austrian Football Bundesliga ==
Note: Flags indicate national team as has been defined under FIFA eligibility rules. Players may hold more than one non-FIFA nationality.

=== Sturm Graz ===
In:

No.	Pos.	Nation	Player
9	FW	FRA	Fally Mayulu (on loan from (England) Bristol City)
18	DF	ENG	Emran Soglo (from (France) Marseille)

Out:

No.	Pos.	Nation	Player
9	FW	TUR	Erencan Yardımcı (loan return to (Germany) TSG Hoffenheim)
11	FW	AUT	Manprit Sarkaria (to (China) Shenzhen Peng City)
18	FW	DEN	Mika Biereth (to (France) Monaco)
22	DF	BIH	Jusuf Gazibegović (to (Germany) 1. FC Köln)

=== Red Bull Salzburg ===
In:

No.	Pos.	Nation	Player
2	DF	BEL	Maximiliano Caufriez (on loan from (France) Clermont, previously on loan at (Spain) Valencia)
9	FW	AUT	Karim Onisiwo (from (Germany) Mainz 05)
11	FW	BEL	Yorbe Vertessen (from (Germany) Union Berlin)
—	DF	BFA	Lassina Traoré (from (Burkina Faso) Rahimo)
—	FW	BFA	Aboubacar Camara (from (Burkina Faso) Rahimo)

Out:

No.	Pos.	Nation	Player
8	MF	ESP	Stefan Bajcetic (loan return to (England) Liverpool)
11	FW	BRA	Fernando (to (Brazil) Red Bull Bragantino)
27	MF	FRA	Lucas Gourna-Douath (on loan to (Italy) Roma)
70	DF	BIH	Amar Dedić (to (France) Marseille)
91	DF	POL	Kamil Piątkowski (on loan to (Turkey) Kasımpaşa)
—	DF	BFA	Lassina Traoré (on loan to Liefering)
—	MF	HUN	Zeteny Jano (on loan to Grazer AK)
—	FW	BFA	Aboubacar Camara (on loan to Liefering)
—	DF	AUT	Raphael Hofer (on loan to Hartberg)
—	FW	AUT	Luka Reischl (on loan to (Netherlands) ADO Den Haag)
—	FW	SUI	Federico Crescenti (on loan to (Switzerland) Rapperswil-Jona, previously on loan at (Liechtenstein) Vaduz)

=== LASK ===
In:

No.	Pos.	Nation	Player
7	FW	USA	Samuel Adeniran (from (United States) Philadelphia Union)
9	MF	CZE	Kryštof Daněk (on loan from (Czech Republic) Sparta Prague)
15	MF	MLI	Mohamed Sanogo (from First Vienna)
27	FW	AUT	Christoph Lang (from Rapid Wien)
32	MF	MLI	Ismaila Coulibaly (from (England) Sheffield United)
33	GK	AUT	Tobias Schützenauer (from (Georgia (country)) Dinamo Tbilisi)

Out:

No.	Pos.	Nation	Player
3	DF	FIN	Tomas Galvez (loan return to (England) Manchester City)
4	DF	UKR	Maksym Talovyerov (to (England) Plymouth Argyle)
7	DF	AUT	Rene Renner (free agent)
9	FW	CRO	Marin Ljubičić (to (Germany) Union Berlin)
20	DF	POR	Tomás Tavares (loan return to (Russia) Spartak Moscow)
28	GK	AUT	Jörg Siebenhandl (to Admira Wacker)

=== Rapid Wien ===
In:

No.	Pos.	Nation	Player
20	DF	CIV	Ange Ahoussou (from (France) Pau)
29	MF	CIV	Amane Romeo (from (Sweden) Hacken)
49	FW	MNE	Andrija Radulović (on loan from (Serbia) Vojvodina)
99	FW	AUT	Ercan Kara (on loan from (Turkey) Samsunspor)

Out:

No.	Pos.	Nation	Player
10	FW	AUT	Christoph Lang (to LASK)
14	FW	MAR	Ryan Mmaee (loan return to (England) Stoke City)
19	FW	BRB	Thierry Gale (on loan to (Poland) Piast Gliwice)
20	DF	AUT	Maximilian Hofmann (to (Hungary) Debrecen)
24	MF	TUR	Dennis Kaygin (on loan to (Netherlands) Willem II)
38	FW	NED	Ferdy Druijf (free agent)
41	FW	AUT	Bernhard Zimmermann (to First Vienna)
—	FW	AUT	Samuel Horak (on loan to Kremser SC)
—	FW	AUT	Oliver Strunz (on loan to FAC, previously on loan at SCR Altach)

=== Hartberg ===
In:

No.	Pos.	Nation	Player
19	DF	AUT	Raphael Hofer (on loan from Red Bull Salzburg)
25	DF	AUT	Emmanuel Ojukwu (from Wiener Sport-Club)
33	FW	AUT	Muharem Husković (on loan from Austria Wien)
79	FW	AUS	Jed Drew (from (Australia) Macarthur)

Out:

No.	Pos.	Nation	Player
3	MF	NIR	Charlie Osborne (loan return to (England) Bournemouth)
17	MF	AUT	Jonas Karner (on loan to Sturm Graz II)
19	MF	AUT	Onurhan Babuşcu (loan return to (Turkey) Gaziantep)
77	FW	AUT	Aaron Sky Schwarz (loan return to Rapid Wien II)

=== Austria Klagenfurt ===
In:

No.	Pos.	Nation	Player
4	DF	NED	Denzel Owusu (free agent)
11	MF	GER	Keanan Bennetts (free agent)
13	DF	AUT	Martin Hinteregger (from SGA Sirnitz)
33	MF	USA	Steven Juncaj (from (Slovenia) Mura)
70	FW	AUT	Aaron Sky Schwarz (on loan from Rapid Wien II, previously on loan at Hartberg)

Out:

No.	Pos.	Nation	Player
11	FW	USA	Sebastian Soto (free agent)
80	MF	KOR	Lee Min-young (on loan to (Germany) Viktoria Berlin)
—	GK	CRO	Ivan Kešina (on loan to (Germany) Viktoria Berlin)

=== Wolfsberg ===
In:

No.	Pos.	Nation	Player
6	MF	CIV	Abou Sylla (from (Ivory Coast) SOA)
18	MF	AUT	Alessandro Schöpf (from (Canada) Vancouver Whitecaps)
30	MF	CIV	Claude Kouakou (from (Israel) Hapoel Acre)
—	FW	CIV	Anderson Niangbo (free agent)

Out:

No.	Pos.	Nation	Player
15	FW	AUT	Michael Morgenstern (to Lendorf)

=== Austria Wien ===
In:

No.	Pos.	Nation	Player
—	DF	AUT	Matteo Schablas (from Liefering)

Out:

No.	Pos.	Nation	Player
9	FW	AUT	Muharem Husković (on loan to Hartberg)
40	DF	AUT	Matteo Meisl (on loan to Stripfing)
66	DF	LUX	Marvin Martins (to (Netherlands) Almere City)
70	FW	BRA	Cristiano (loan return to (Brazil) São Bento)
—	DF	AUT	Matteo Schablas (on loan to Stripfing)
—	DF	AUT	Tobias Polz (on loan to Union Mauer)
—	DF	AUT	Florian Kopp (to Wacker Innsbruck)
—	GK	GUI	Sandali Condé (to Admira Wacker, previously on loan at Stripfing)
—	MF	AUT	Timo Schmelzer (to Parndorf, previously on loan at Stripfing)

=== Blau-Weiß Linz ===
In:

No.	Pos.	Nation	Player
4	DF	GER	Elias Bakatukanda (on loan from (Germany) 1. FC Köln)
24	GK	AUT	Thomas Turner (from St. Pölten)

Out:

No.	Pos.	Nation	Player
4	DF	SUI	Silvan Wallner (retired)
—	FW	AUT	Stefan Feiertag (on loan to (Germany) 1. FC Saarbrücken, previously on loan at (Poland) ŁKS Łódź)

=== SCR Altach ===
In:

No.	Pos.	Nation	Player
2	DF	CMR	Steve Noode (on loan from (Germany) Schalke 04)
3	DF	AUT	Benedikt Zech (from (Poland) Pogoń Szczecin)
9	FW	GER	Florian Dietz (on loan from (Germany) 1. FC Köln)
11	FW	AUT	Marlon Mustapha (on loan from (Italy) Como, previously on loan at (Germany) Greuther Fürth)
20	MF	AUT	Alexander Gorgon (from (Poland) Pogoń Szczecin)

Out:

No.	Pos.	Nation	Player
9	FW	KOS	Atdhe Nuhiu (retired)
10	FW	BRA	Lincoln (on loan to (Brazil) Athletic)
11	FW	FRA	Sofian Bahloul (on loan to (Switzerland) Aarau)
17	FW	AUT	Oliver Strunz (loan return to Rapid Wien)
20	FW	BRA	Gustavo (to (Japan) Vegalta Sendai)

=== WSG Tirol ===
In:

No.	Pos.	Nation	Player
24	DF	GER	Jonas David (free agent)

Out:

No.	Pos.	Nation	Player
19	FW	AUT	Justin Forst (to Voitsberg)

=== Grazer AK ===
In:

No.	Pos.	Nation	Player
3	DF	CRO	Antonio Tikvić (on loan from (England) Watford)
6	DF	TOG	Sadik Fofana (from (Germany) Bayer Leverkusen)
8	MF	HUN	László Kleinheisler (from (Greece) Panathinaikos)
18	MF	HUN	Zeteny Jano (on loan from Red Bull Salzburg)
44	GK	AUT	Florian Wiegele (on loan from (Czech Republic) Viktoria Plzeň)

Out:

No.	Pos.	Nation	Player
6	MF	AUT	Markus Rusek (to First Vienna)
8	MF	AUT	Gabriel Zirngast (loan return to Juniors OÖ)
18	FW	JPN	Atsushi Zaizen (on loan to Voitsberg)
21	DF	AUT	Michael Lang (on loan to Kapfenberg)
22	DF	AUT	Felix Holzhacker (to Admira Wacker)
24	MF	GER	Dennis Dressel (to (Germany) SSV Ulm)
33	GK	AUT	Juri Kirchmayr (on loan to Voitsberg)
99	FW	CMR	Michael Cheukoua (to (China) Meizhou Hakka)
—	DF	AUT	Moritz Eder (on loan to Austria Salzburg)
—	FW	CMR	Kevin-Prince Milla (on loan to (Czech Republic) Dukla Prague, previously on loan at Voitsberg)

== See also ==
- 2024–25 Austrian Football Bundesliga
