= Zeteny Jano =

Austrian footballer

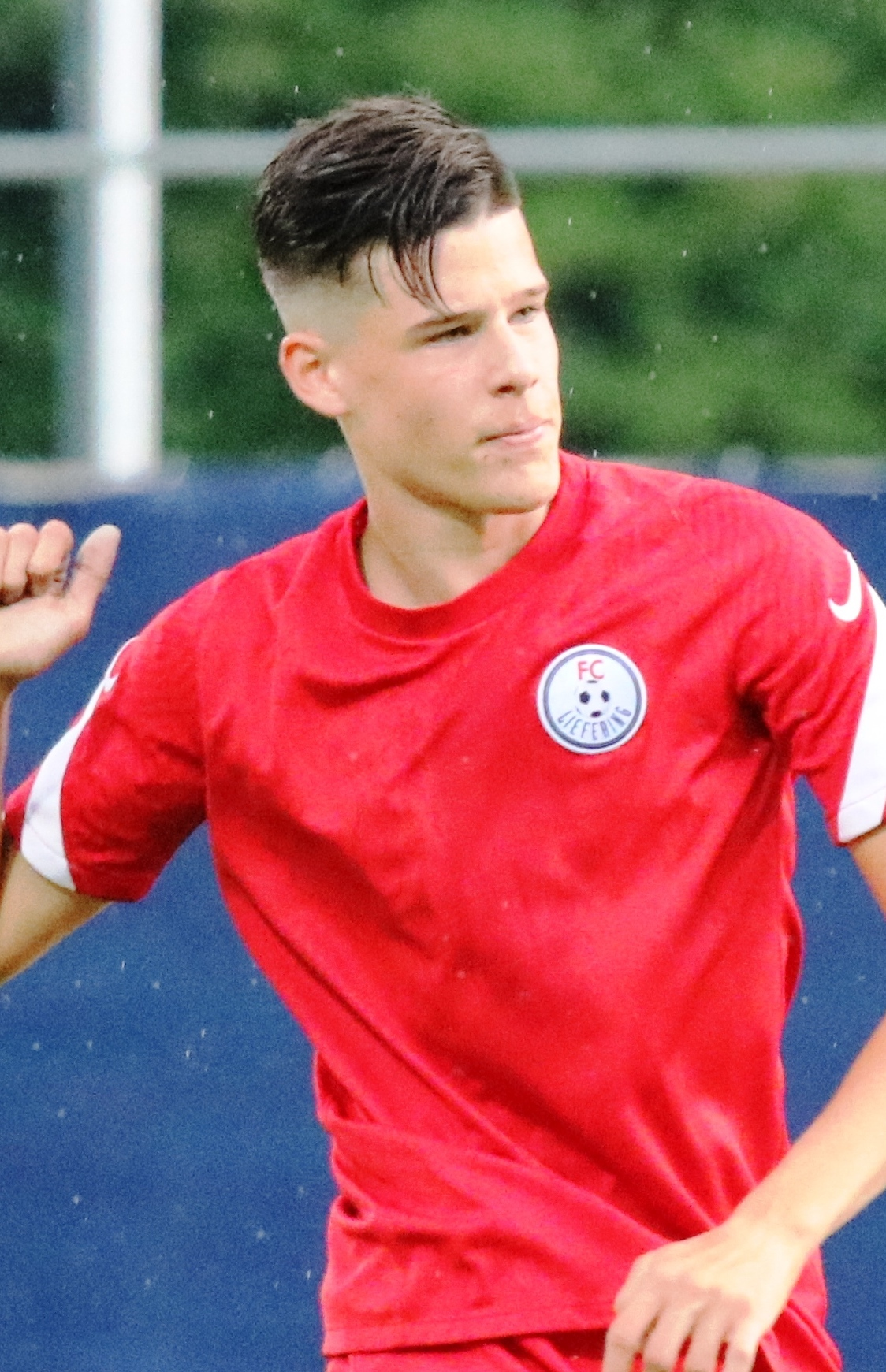
- Jano in 2022

Personal information
- Date of birth: 13 March 2005 (age 21)
- Place of birth: Eisenstadt, Austria
- Height: 1.67 m (5 ft 6 in)
- Position: Midfielder

Team information
- Current team: Jahn Regensburg
- Number: 21

Youth career
- 2011–2013: Soproni VSE
- 2013–2018: FC Sopron
- 2018: SC Lichtenwörth
- 2018–2019: FC Liefering
- 2019–2022: Red Bull Salzburg

Senior career*
Years	Team	Apps	(Gls)
2022–2025	FC Liefering	76	(13)
2025–2026	Red Bull Salzburg	0	(0)
2025–2026	→ Grazer AK (loan)	25	(1)
2026–	Jahn Regensburg	2	(0)

International career^{‡}
2021	Austria U17	2	(0)
2022–2023	Austria U18	6	(2)
2023–2024	Austria U19	6	(0)
2024–	Austria U21	1	(0)
- * Club domestic league appearances and goals as of 14:42, 26 September 2026 (UTC) ‡ National team caps and goals as of 10 October 2024

Zeteny Jano (Hungarian: Jánó Zétény; born 13 March 2005) is a professional footballer who plays as a midfielder for 3. Liga club Jahn Regensburg. He was included in The Guardian's "Next Generation" list for 2022. He is a youth international for Austria.

== Club career ==
On 1 February 2025, Jano joined Austrian Bundesliga club Grazer AK, on loan for the 2025–26 season.

In August 2026, he transferred permanently to German 3. Liga club Jahn Regensburg.

== International career ==
Born in Eisenstadt, Austria to Székely father and Hungarian mother, Jano holds dual Hungarian-Austrian citizenship. He is a youth international for Austria, having played up to the Austria U18s.

== Career statistics ==
As of match played 26 September 2026

Appearances and goals by club, season and competition
Club	Season	League			Cup		Continental		Other		Total	
Club	Season	Division	Apps	Goals	Apps	Goals	Apps	Goals	Apps	Goals	Apps	Goals
FC Liefering	2021–22	2. Liga	7	0	0	0	—		0	0	7	0
FC Liefering	2022–23	2. Liga	29	4	0	0	—		0	0	29	4
FC Liefering	2023–24	2. Liga	26	6	0	0	—		0	0	26	6
FC Liefering	2024–25	2. Liga	14	3	0	0	—		0	0	14	3
FC Liefering	Total		76	13	0	0	0	0	0	0	76	13
Grazer AK (loan)	2024–25	Austrian Bundesliga	14	1	1	0	—		0	0	15	1
Grazer AK (loan)	2025–26	Austrian Bundesliga	11	0	0	0	—		0	0	11	0
Grazer AK (loan)	Total		25	1	1	0	—		0	0	26	1
Jahn Regensburg	2026–27	3. Liga	2	0	—		—		0	0	2	0
Career total			103	14	1	0	0	0	0	0	104	14
