= Justin Omoregie =

Austrian footballer

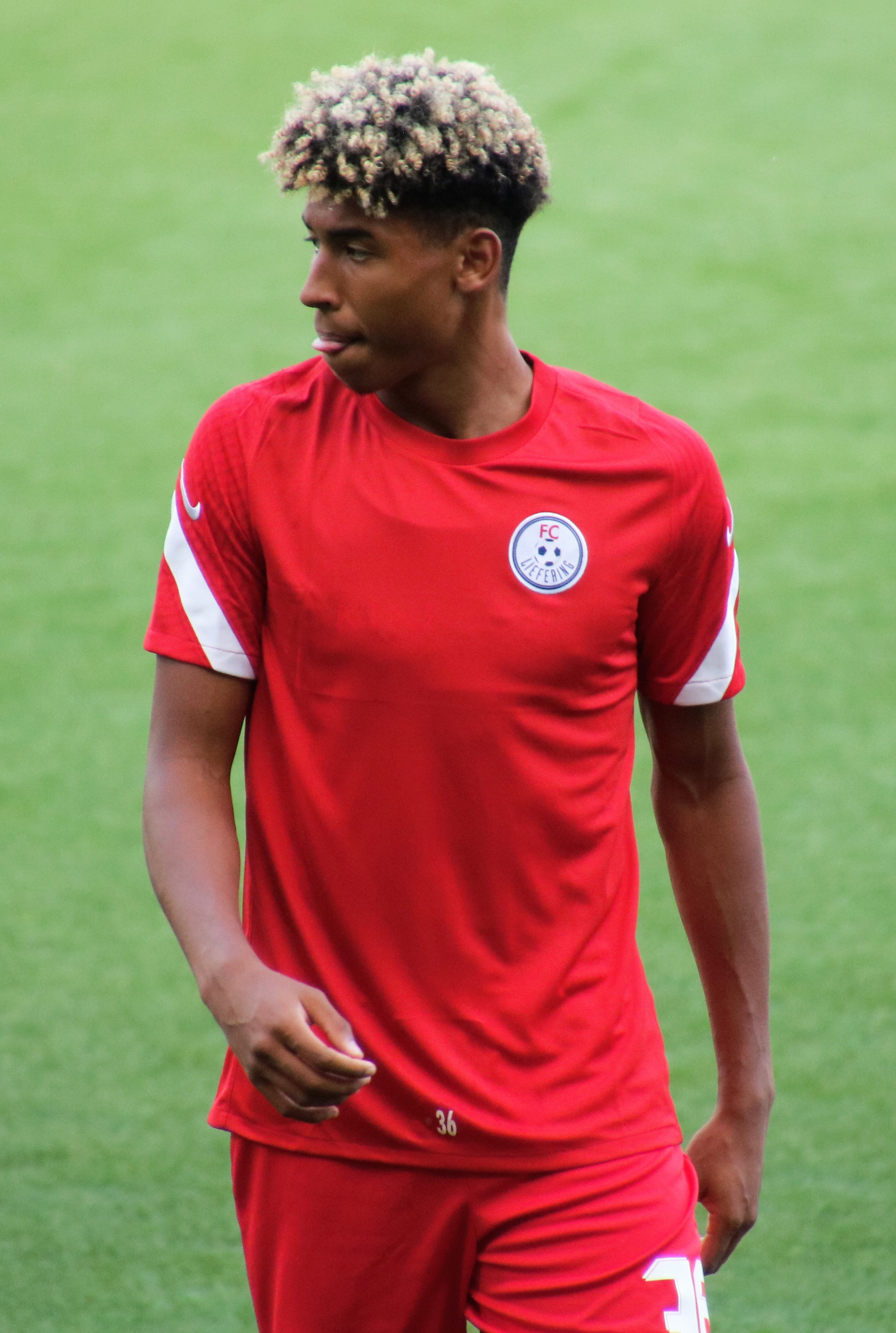
- Omoregie with Liefering in 2021

Personal information
- Date of birth: 21 September 2003 (age 23)
- Place of birth: Vienna, Austria
- Height: 1.91 m (6 ft 3 in)
- Positions: Defender; midfielder

Team information
- Current team: Red Bull Salzburg
- Number: 36

Youth career
- 2008–2011: SV Aspern
- 2011–2013: First Vienna FC
- 2013–2017: Austria Wien
- 2017–2021: Red Bull Salzburg

Senior career*
Years	Team	Apps	(Gls)
2021–	FC Liefering	31	(2)
2022–	Red Bull Salzburg	0	(0)
2024–2025	→ TSV Hartberg (loan)	19	(0)

International career^{‡}
2018–2019	Austria U16	10	(1)
2019	Austria U17	5	(0)
2021–2022	Austria U19	10	(0)
2024–	Austria U21	2	(0)
- * Club domestic league appearances and goals as of 11 June 2025 ‡ National team caps and goals as of 30 September 2024

Justin Omoregie (born 21 September 2003) is an Austrian professional footballer who plays as a defender and midfielder for Austrian Bundesliga club Red Bull Salzburg.

== International career ==
Omorogie was born in Austria to a Polish mother and Nigerian father. He is a youth international for Austria.

He represented Austria at the 2022 UEFA European Under-19 Championship.

== Career statistics ==
As of match played 10 May 2025

Appearances and goals by club, season and competition
Club	Season	League			Austrian Cup		Continental		Other		Total	
Club	Season	Division	Apps	Goals	Apps	Goals	Apps	Goals	Apps	Goals	Apps	Goals
FC Liefering	2021–22	2. Liga	18	1	0	0	—		0	0	18	1
FC Liefering	2022–23	2. Liga	2	0	0	0	—		0	0	2	0
FC Liefering	2023–24	2. Liga	11	1	0	0	—		0	0	11	1
FC Liefering	Total		31	2	0	0	—		0	0	31	2
TSV Hartberg (loan)	2024–25	Austrian Bundesliga	19	0	3	1	—		0	0	22	1
Career total			50	2	3	1	—		0	0	53	3
