= Romeo Vučić =

Austrian association footballer

Personal information
- Date of birth: 30 January 2003 (age 23)
- Place of birth: Vienna, Austria
- Height: 1.86 m (6 ft 1 in)
- Position: Striker

Team information
- Current team: Blau-Weiß Linz
- Number: 11

Youth career
- 2009–2014: Rapid Wien
- 2014–2021: Austria Wien

Senior career*
Years	Team	Apps	(Gls)
2021–2023	Austria Wien II	24	(3)
2022–2026	Austria Wien	42	(3)
2024–2025	→ Grazer AK (loan)	17	(2)
2026–	Blau-Weiß Linz	3	(2)

International career^{‡}
2018	Austria U15	7	(2)
2018–2019	Austria U16	4	(1)
2022–2024	Austria U21	5	(0)
- * Club domestic league appearances and goals as of 14 August 2026 ‡ National team caps and goals as of 26 March 2024

Romeo Vučić (born 30 January 2003) is an Austrian professional footballer who plays as a striker for 2. Liga club Blau-Weiß Linz.

== Career ==
Vučić is a youth product of Rapid Wien before joining the youth academy of Austria Wien in 2014. He was promoted to their reserves and eventually senior team in 2021. He signed his first professional contract with Austria Wien on 3 July 2021. He signed his first professional contract with the club on 22 March 2022. He made his senior debut with Austria Wien in a 0–0 Austrian Football Bundesliga tie with Austria Klagenfurt on 21 November 2021.

On 19 July 2024, Vučić joined Grazer AK on a season-long loan.

== International career ==
Vučić is a youth international for Austria, having represented the Austria U15s and the U16s.

== Personal life ==
Vučić's father, Novak, is a Bosnian-born football director in Austria.
