= Christoph Nicht =

Austrian footballer

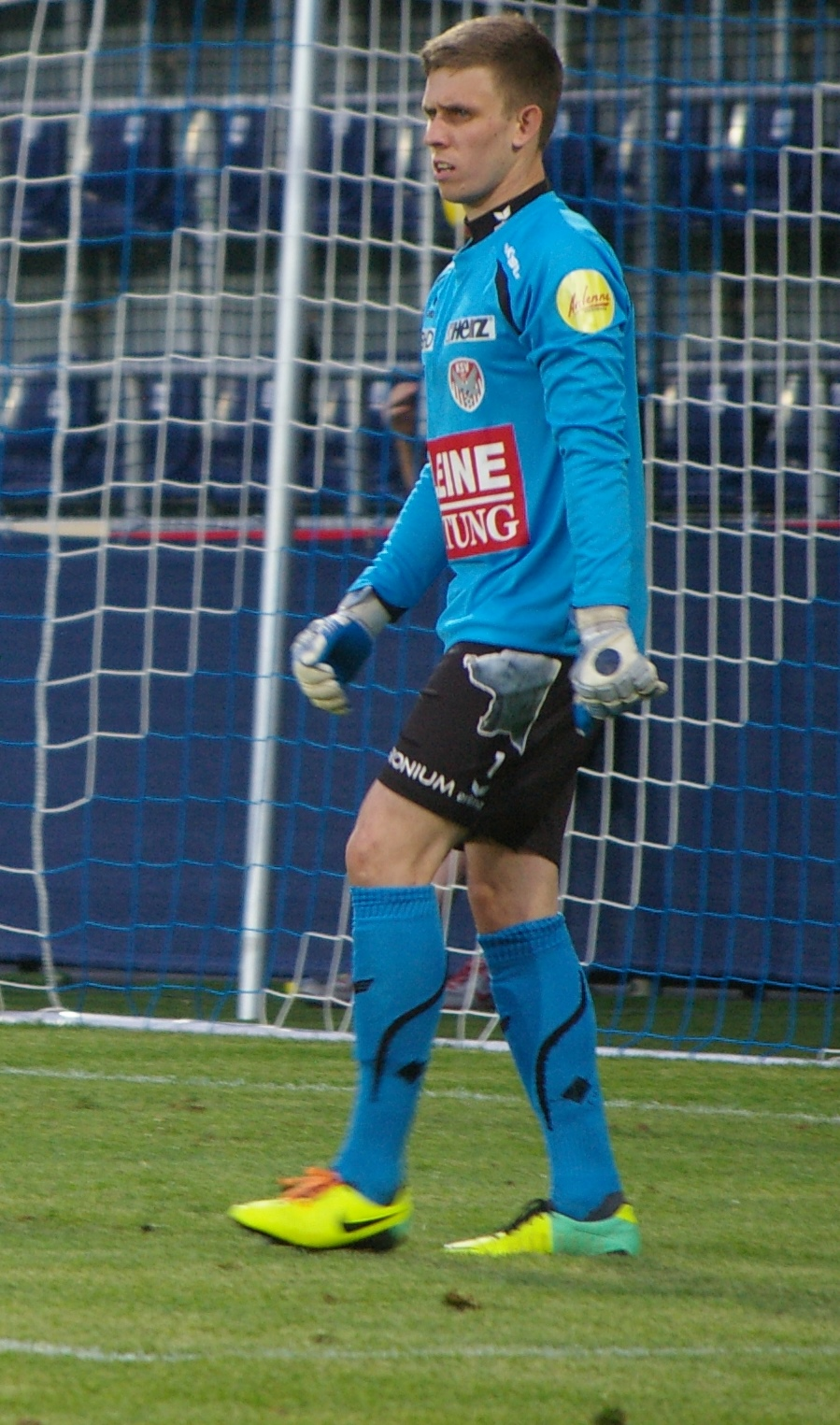
- Nicht in 2015

Personal information
- Date of birth: 5 January 1994 (age 32)
- Place of birth: Bruck an der Mur, Austria
- Height: 1.84 m (6 ft 0 in)
- Position: Goalkeeper

Team information
- Current team: Grazer AK
- Number: 26

Youth career
- 1999–2008: Mürzhofen
- 2008–2009: St. Marein/St. Lorenzen
- 2009–2012: Kapfenberger SV

Senior career*
Years	Team	Apps	(Gls)
2012–2017	Kapfenberger SV	109	(0)
2017–2018	Naxxar Lions	19	(0)
2018–2019	Austria Klagenfurt	7	(0)
2020–	Grazer AK	51	(0)
- * Club domestic league appearances and goals as of 26 May 2024

Christoph Nicht (born 5 January 1994) is an Austrian professional footballer who plays as a goalkeeper for Grazer AK.
