= Michael Cheukoua =

Cameroonian association footballer

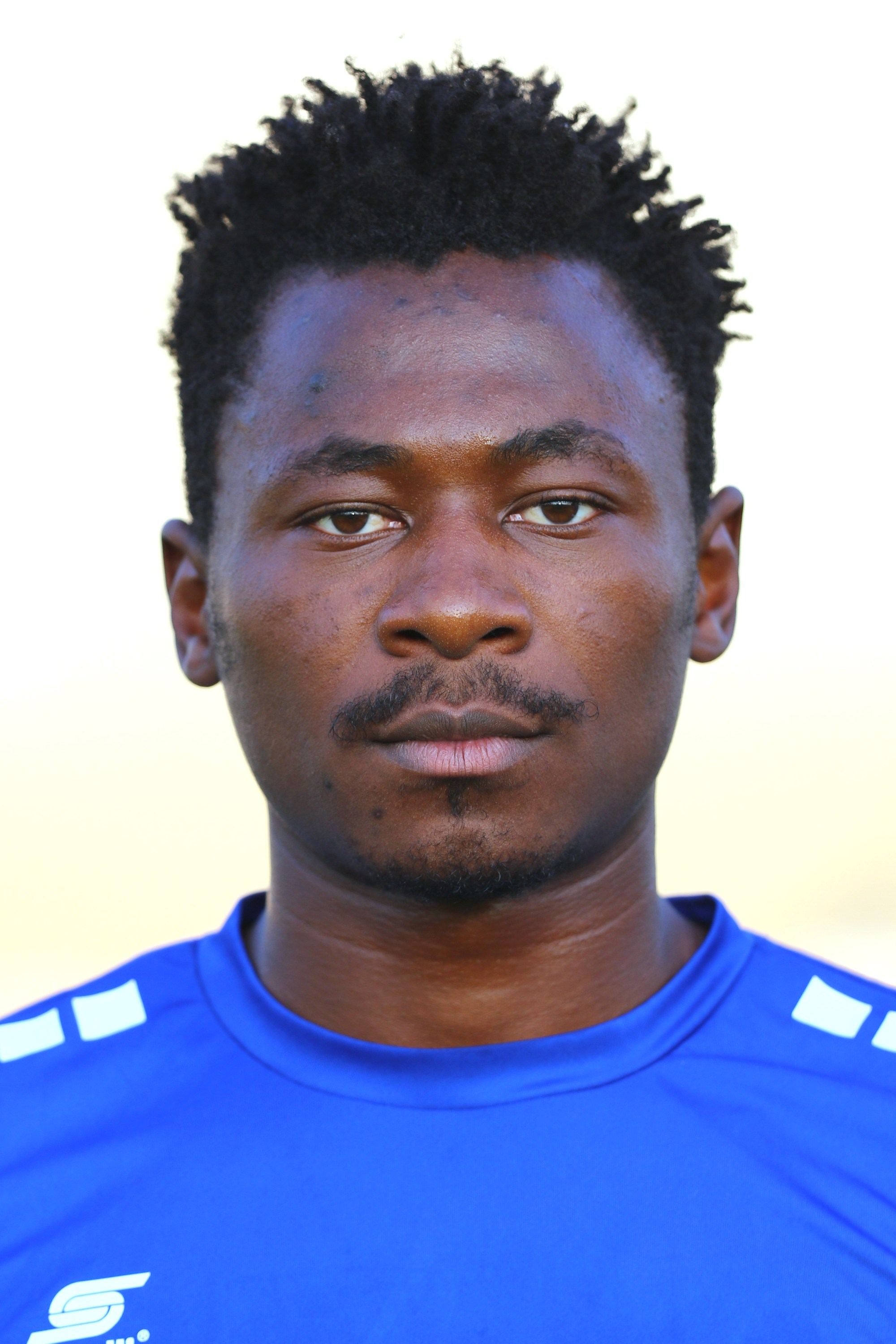
- Cheukoua in 2018

Personal information
- Date of birth: 13 January 1997 (age 29)
- Place of birth: Cameroon
- Height: 1.81 m (5 ft 11 in)
- Position: Winger

Team information
- Current team: Al Orooba
- Number: 13

Youth career
- Canon Yaoundé

Senior career*
Years	Team	Apps	(Gls)
2016–2017	Canon Yaoundé	30	(10)
2017–2018	SC Rheindorf Altach II	19	(5)
2018–2019	SC Rheindorf Altach	6	(1)
2018–2019	→ 1. Wiener Neustädter (loan)	27	(6)
2019–2021	SV Horn	57	(15)
2021–2023	Austria Lustenau	48	(12)
2023–2025	Grazer AK	34	(7)
2025	Meizhou Hakka	14	(3)
2025	Guangxi Pingguo	14	(5)
2026–	Al Orooba	0	(0)

International career^{‡}
2019	Cameroon U23	2	(0)
- * Club domestic league appearances and goals as of 27 December 2024 ‡ National team caps and goals as of 23:48, 8 September 2022 (UTC)

Michael Cheukoua (born 13 January 1997) is a Cameroonian professional footballer who plays as a winger for UAE First Division League club Al Orooba.

== Club career ==
Cheukoua began his senior career in his native Cameroon with Canon Yaoundé. He transferred to the Austrian club Rheindorf Altach on 26 August 2017, and initially was assigned to their reserves before playing for their senior team. He joined Wiener Neustädter on loan for the 2018–19 season. In the summer of 2021, he transferred to SV Horn.

Cheukoua moved to crosstown rivals Austria Lustenau on 24 June 2021, signing a 2-year contract. In his first season with them, he helped them win the 2021–22 and earn promotion into the Austrian Football Bundesliga.

== International career ==
Cheukoua played for the Cameroon U23s at the 2019 Africa U-23 Cup of Nations.

== Career statistics ==
As of match played 8 November 2025

Appearances and goals by club, season and competition
Club	Season	League			Cup		Continental		Other		Total	
Club	Season	Division	Apps	Goals	Apps	Goals	Apps	Goals	Apps	Goals	Apps	Goals
SC Rheindorf Altach II	2017–18	Austrian Regionalliga	19	5	—		—		—		19	5
SC Rheindorf Altach	2017–18	Austrian Bundesliga	6	1	—		—		—		6	1
1. Wiener Neustädter (loan)	2018–19	Austrian Second League	27	6	3	1	—		—		30	7
SV Horn	2019–20	Austrian Second League	29	10	2	0	—		—		31	10
SV Horn	2020–21	Austrian Second League	28	5	2	1	—		—		30	6
SV Horn	Total		57	15	4	1	—		—		61	16
Austria Lustenau	2021–22	Austrian Second League	29	9	2	0	—		—		31	9
Austria Lustenau	2022–23	Austrian Bundesliga	19	3	2	0	—		—		21	3
Austria Lustenau	Total		48	12	4	0	—		—		52	12
Grazer AK	2023–24	Austrian Second League	25	6	3	1	—		—		28	7
Grazer AK	2024–25	Austrian Bundesliga	9	1	3	3	—		—		12	4
Grazer AK	Total		34	7	6	4	—		—		40	11
Meizhou Hakka	2025	Chinese Super League	14	3	0	0	—		—		14	3
Guangxi Pingguo	2025	China League One	14	5	—		—		—		14	5
Career total			219	54	17	6	0	0	0	0	236	60

== Honours ==
Austria Lustenau

- Austrian Football Second League: 2021–22
