= Sadik Fofana =

Togolese footballer (born 2003)

Personal information
- Date of birth: 16 May 2003 (age 23)
- Place of birth: Aachen, Germany
- Height: 1.92 m (6 ft 4 in)
- Positions: Defender; midfielder

Team information
- Current team: Lecce
- Number: 8

Youth career
- 2008–2013: Kohlscheider BC
- 2013–2018: SpVgg Straß
- 2018–2020: Alemannia Aachen
- 2020–2021: Bayer Leverkusen

Senior career*
Years	Team	Apps	(Gls)
2021–2025	Bayer Leverkusen	0	(0)
2022–2023	→ 1. FC Nürnberg (loan)	19	(0)
2023–2024	→ Fortuna Sittard (loan)	11	(0)
2025–2026	Grazer AK	29	(0)
2026–	Lecce	5	(0)

International career^{‡}
2022–2023	Germany U20	6	(0)
2024–	Togo	10	(1)
- * Club domestic league appearances and goals as of 25 May 2026 ‡ National team caps and goals as of 20 June 2026

Sadik Fofana (born 16 May 2003) is a professional footballer who plays as a defender for Serie A club Lecce. Born in Germany, he represents the Togo national team.

== Club career ==
Fofana started his career with Bundesliga side Bayer Leverkusen. In 2022, he was sent on loan to 1. FC Nürnberg in the German second tier. On 24 July 2022, Fofana debuted for 1. FC Nürnberg during a 2−0 win over Greuther Fürth.

On 25 July 2023, Fofana joined Fortuna Sittard in Eredivisie on loan.

On 11 January 2025, Fofana moved to Grazer AK in Austria on a two-and-a-half-year contract.

On 10 January 2026, Fofana signed with Lecce in Italy.

== International career ==
Born in Germany, Fofana is of Togolese descent. He was called up to the Germany national U20 team in September 2022.

Fofana received his first-call up for Togo in November 2023, for a 2026 FIFA World Cup qualifier against Senegal, without making his debut. On 14 March 2024, he was called up to Togo national team coach Paulo Duarte's squad ahead of friendlies against Niger and Libya. He made his full international debut on 22 March, starting in a 2−1 victory against Niger.

== Career statistics ==
As of match played 9 September 2025

Scores and results list Togo's goal tally first, score column indicates score after each Fofana goal.

List of international goals scored by Sadik Fofana
No.	Date	Venue	Opponent	Score	Result	Competition
1	9 September 2025	Stade de Kégué, Lomé, Togo	Sudan	1–0	1–0	2026 FIFA World Cup qualification
