= Levan Eloshvili =

Georgian footballer

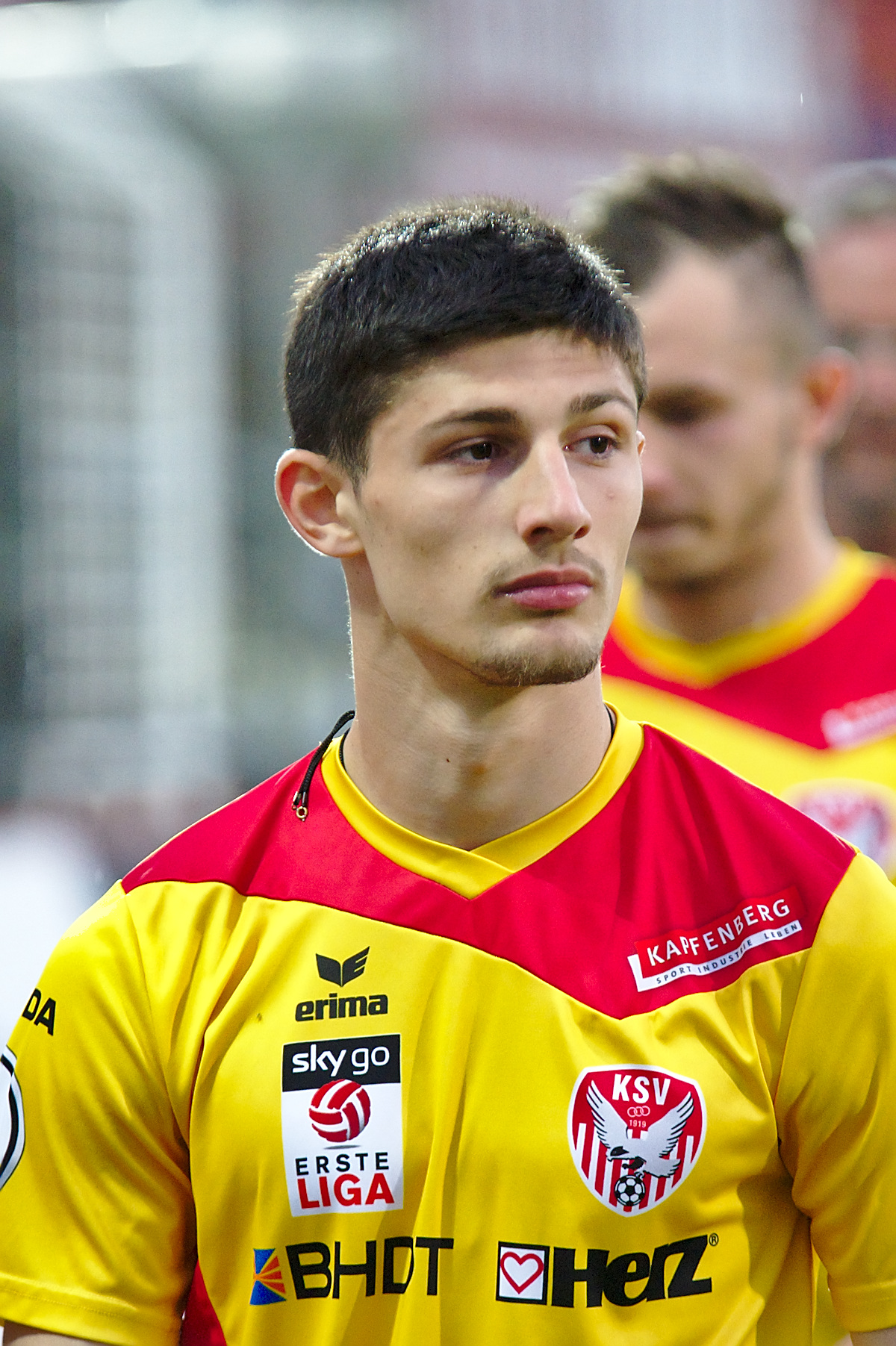
- Eloshvili with Kapfenberger SV in 2017

Personal information
- Date of birth: 21 October 1997 (age 29)
- Place of birth: Tbilisi, Georgia
- Height: 1.77 m (5 ft 10 in)
- Position: Right winger

Team information
- Current team: Schwarz-Weiß Bregenz
- Number: 9

Youth career
- 2013–2014: KSV Ankerbrot Montelaa
- 2014–2017: Kapfenberger SV
- 2014: → SVA Kindberg (loan)

Senior career*
Years	Team	Apps	(Gls)
2017–2022	Kapfenberger SV	110	(17)
2022–2024	Grazer AK	30	(5)
2024–2025	Kapfenberger SV	19	(3)
2025–	Schwarz-Weiß Bregenz	11	(1)

International career^{‡}
2017–2018	Georgia U-21	2	(0)
- * Club domestic league appearances and goals as of 17 May 2026 ‡ National team caps and goals as of 24 January 2021

Levan Eloshvili (Georgian: ლევან ელოშვილი; born 21 October 1997) is a Georgian professional footballer who plays as a right winger for Austrian club Schwarz-Weiß Bregenz.

== Club career ==
He made his Austrian Football First League debut for Kapfenberger SV on 26 May 2017 in a game against Floridsdorfer AC.

On 18 May 2022, Eloshvili signed a two-year contract with an option for an additional year with Grazer AK.
