= Atsushi Zaizen =

Japanese footballer

Personal information
- Date of birth: 26 June 1999 (age 27)
- Place of birth: Fukuoka, Japan
- Height: 1.77 m (5 ft 10 in)
- Position: Midfielder

Team information
- Current team: SW Bregenz
- Number: 24

Youth career
- Kokura Minami FC
- –2018: Kyoto Sanga

Senior career*
| Years | Team | Apps | (Gls) |
| 2018–2019 | Wacker Innsbruck II | 23 | (3) |
| 2019–2022 | Wacker Innsbruck | 66 | (17) |
| 2022–2025 | Grazer AK | 24 | (1) |
| 2024 | → SKU Amstetten (loan) | 15 | (0) |
| 2025 | → ASK Voitsberg (loan) | 13 | (2) |
| 2025– | SW Bregenz | 20 | (3) |
- * Club domestic league appearances and goals as of 17 May 2026

Atsushi Zaizen (財前 淳, Zaizen Atsushi; born 26 June 1999) is a Japanese professional footballer who plays as a midfielder for Austrian club SW Bregenz.

== Career statistics ==
=== Club ===
As of match played 18 October 2025.

| Club | Season | League | | | Cup | | Other | | Total | |
| Club | Season | Division | Apps | Goals | Apps | Goals | Apps | Goals | Apps | Goals |
|---|---|---|---|---|---|---|---|---|---|---|
| Wacker Innsbruck II | 2018–19 | 2. Liga | 22 | 3 | – | | 0 | 0 | 22 | 3 |
| Wacker Innsbruck II | 2019–20 | Regionalliga | 1 | 0 | – | | 0 | 0 | 1 | 0 |
| Wacker Innsbruck II | Total | | 23 | 3 | 0 | 0 | 0 | 0 | 23 | 3 |
| Wacker Innsbruck | 2019–20 | 2. Liga | 26 | 7 | 4 (Note: Appearances in the Austrian Cup) | 1 | 0 | 0 | 30 | 8 |
| Wacker Innsbruck | 2020–21 | 2. Liga | 30 | 9 | 3 | 1 | 0 | 0 | 22 | 8 |
| Wacker Innsbruck | 2021–22 | 2. Liga | 10 | 1 | 1 | 0 | 0 | 0 | 11 | 1 |
| Wacker Innsbruck | Total | | 66 | 17 | 8 | 2 | 0 | 0 | 74 | 19 |
| Grazer AK | 2022–23 | 2. Liga | 2 | 0 | 0 | 0 | 0 | 0 | 2 | 0 |
| Grazer AK | 2023–24 | 2. Liga | 10 | 0 | 1 | 0 | 0 | 0 | 11 | 0 |
| Grazer AK | 2024–25 | Bundesliga | 12 | 1 | 2 | 0 | 0 | 0 | 14 | 1 |
| Grazer AK | Total | | 24 | 1 | 3 | 0 | 0 | 0 | 27 | 1 |
| SKU Amstetten (loan) | 2023–24 | 2. Liga | 15 | 0 | 0 | 0 | 0 | 0 | 15 | 0 |
| ASK Voitsberg (loan) | 2024–25 | 2. Liga | 13 | 2 | 0 | 0 | 0 | 0 | 13 | 2 |
| SW Bregenz | 2025–26 | 2. Liga | 9 | 3 | 0 | 0 | 0 | 0 | 9 | 3 |
| Career total | | | 150 | 26 | 11 | 2 | 0 | 0 | 161 | 28 |
