= Benjamin Rosenberger =

Austrian footballer

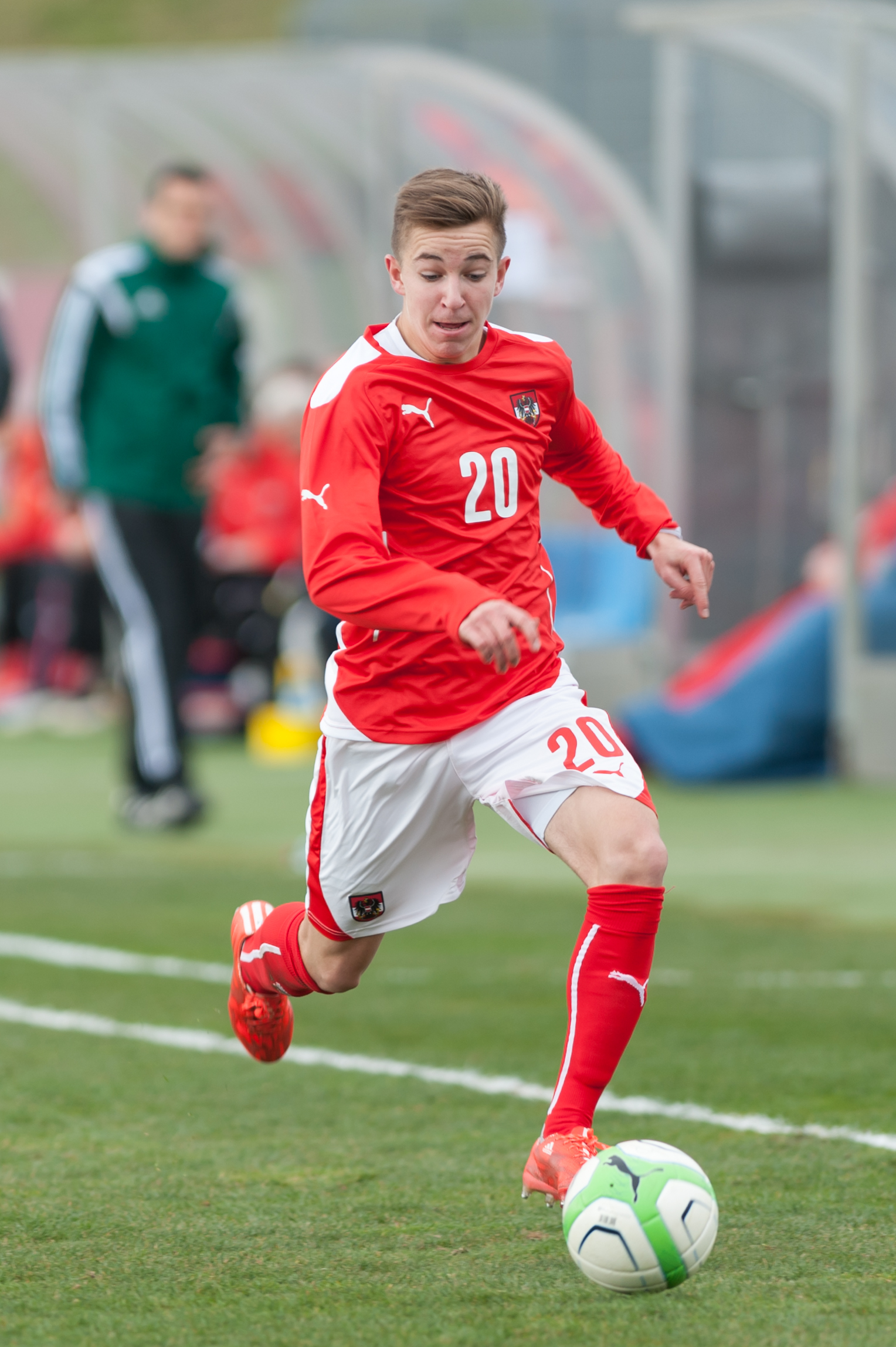

Personal information
- Date of birth: 15 June 1996 (age 30)
- Place of birth: Graz, Austria
- Height: 1.72 m (5 ft 8 in)
- Position: Left midfielder

Team information
- Current team: First Vienna
- Number: 17

Youth career
- 2003–2007: USV Eggersdorf
- 2007–2010: Grazer AK
- 2010–2012: Red Bull Salzburg
- 2012–2013: Sturm Graz

Senior career*
Years	Team	Apps	(Gls)
2013–2016	Sturm Graz II	48	(6)
2015–2017	Sturm Graz	3	(0)
2016–2017	→ Wolfsberger AC (loan)	1	(0)
2017–2019	Kapfenberger SV	47	(1)
2019–2025	Grazer AK	134	(5)
2025–	First Vienna	27	(1)

International career
2014	Austria U18	3	(0)
2015	Austria U19	3	(0)
- * Club domestic league appearances and goals as of 17 May 2026

Benjamin Rosenberger (born 15 June 1996) is an Austrian professional footballer who plays as a midfielder for First Vienna.

== Career ==
On 26 June 2019, Rosenberger signed for Grazer AK. He would go on to win the 2023–24 2. Liga with GAK, making 22 appearances within that season.

On 10 July 2025, Rosenberger signed for First Vienna.
