= Miloš Jovičić =

Austrian association footballer

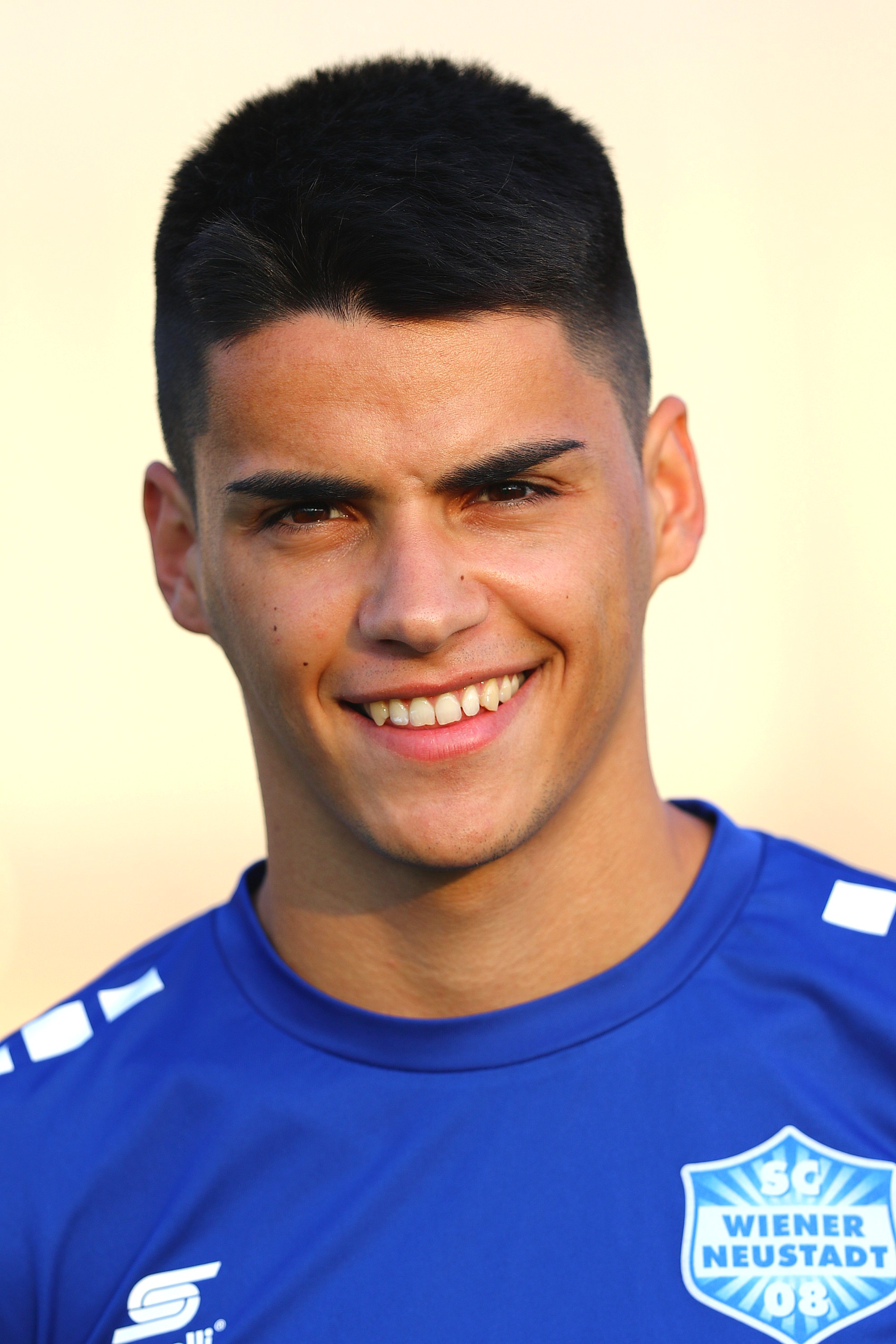
- Jovičić in 2018

Personal information
- Date of birth: 29 January 1995 (age 31)
- Place of birth: Serbia
- Height: 1.87 m (6 ft 2 in)
- Position: Centre-back

Team information
- Current team: Miedź Legnica
- Number: 30

Youth career
- 2005–2012: Rapid Wien

Senior career*
Years	Team	Apps	(Gls)
2012–2015	Rapid Wien II	16	(1)
2015–2016	Ebreichsdorf	2	(0)
2016–2018	Traiskirchen	50	(1)
2018–2019	Wiener Neustadt	16	(1)
2019–2021	Lafnitz	48	(3)
2021–2022	Ried	11	(0)
2022–2025	Grazer AK	76	(8)
2025–	Miedź Legnica	19	(2)
- * Club domestic league appearances and goals as of 14:59, 29 May 2026 (UTC)

Miloš Jovičić (Serbian Cyrillic: Милош Јовичић; born 29 January 1995) is a Serbian professional footballer who plays as a centre-back for I liga club Miedź Legnica.

== Career ==
Jovičić is a product of the youth academy of Rapid Wien, and debuted with their reserves in 2012. He left Rapid Wien in 2015, and had stints at semi-pro clubs Ebreichsdorf and Traiskirchen. On 10 July 2018, he transferred to 2. Liga club Wiener Neustadt. He followed that up with a move to Lafnitz in 2019. He then moved to the Austrian Football Bundesliga with SV Ried on 10 July 2021, signing a contract until 2023.
