= Marco Perchtold =

Austrian footballer

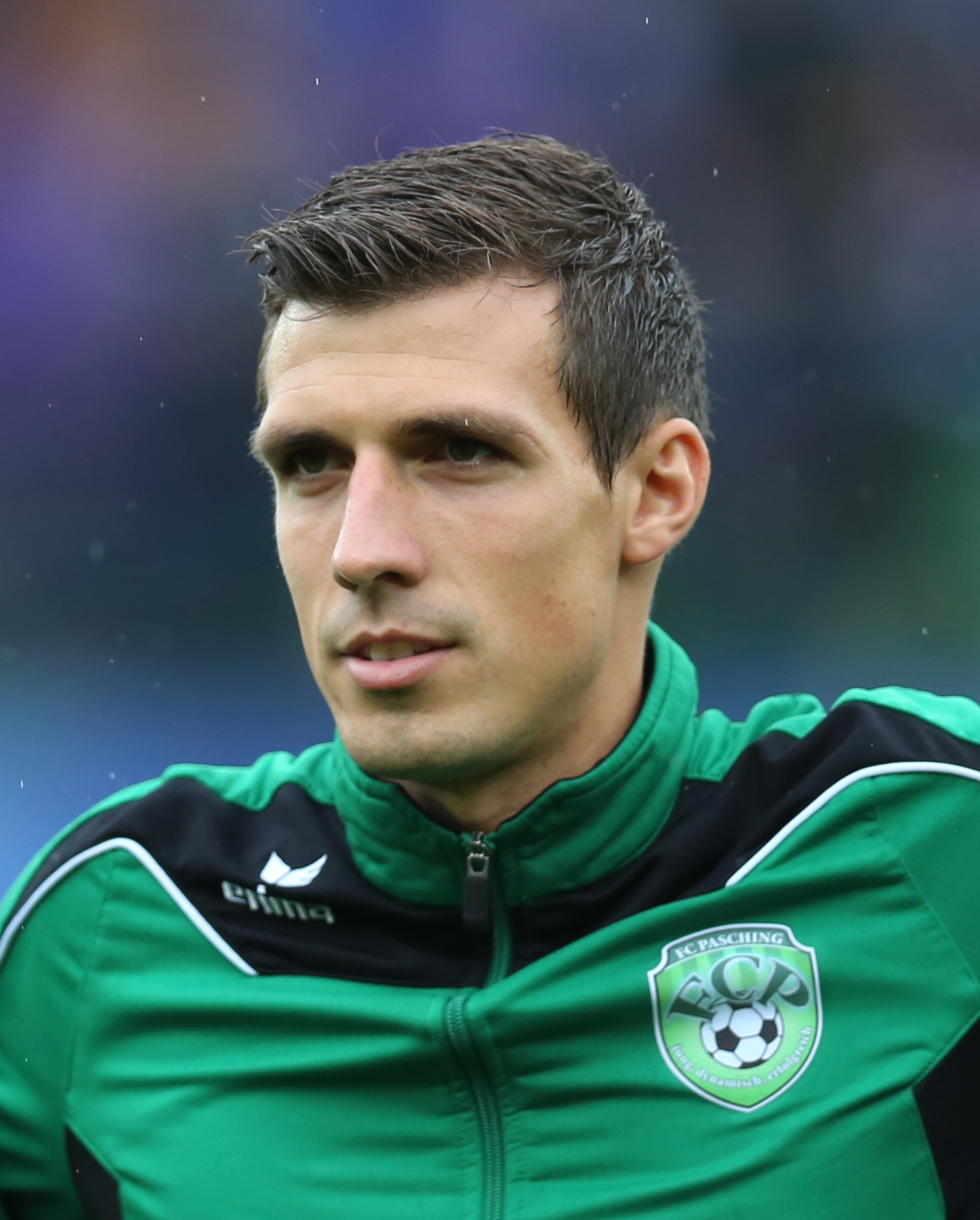

Personal information
- Date of birth: 21 September 1988 (age 38)
- Place of birth: Graz, Austria
- Height: 1.83 m (6 ft 0 in)
- Position: Defensive midfielder

Team information
- Current team: Grazer AK II (player/coach)

Senior career*
Years	Team	Apps	(Gls)
2006–2008	Grazer AK	35	(5)
2008–2009	FC Magna Wiener Neustadt	0	(0)
2009	→ FC Gratkorn (loan)	10	(0)
2009–2012	FC Gratkorn	73	(0)
2012–2014	FC Pasching	56	(10)
2014	→ SV Grödig (loan)	8	(1)
2014–2016	Kapfenberger SV	58	(12)
2016–2017	SKN St. Pölten	23	(3)
2018–2025	Grazer AK	180	(16)
2026–	Grazer AK II		

International career^{‡}
2007	Austria U19	1	(0)
2007	Austria U20	1	(0)

Managerial career
- 2026–: Grazer AK II (player/coach)
- * Club domestic league appearances and goals as of 11 June 2025 ‡ National team caps and goals as of 4 September 2007

Marco Perchtold (born 21 September 1988) is an Austrian professional footballer who plays as a defensive midfielder for Grazer AK II. He is also an assistant coach with the team.

== Honours ==
Pasching

- Austrian Cup: 2012–13
