= Dennis Kaygın =

Turkish footballer (born 2004)

Personal information
- Date of birth: 2 April 2004 (age 22)
- Place of birth: Saulheim, Germany
- Height: 1.86 m (6 ft 1 in)
- Position: Midfielder

Team information
- Current team: FC Ingolstadt
- Number: 10

Youth career
- 2009–2011: FSV 1946 Saulheim
- 2011–2023: Mainz 05

Senior career*
Years	Team	Apps	(Gls)
2023–2024	Rapid Wien II	26	(7)
2023–2025	Rapid Wien	14	(0)
2025	→ Willem II (loan)	9	(0)
2025–	FC Ingolstadt	23	(7)

International career^{‡}
2021	Germany U18	3	(1)
2022	Germany U19	2	(0)
- * Club domestic league appearances and goals as of 29 May 2026 ‡ National team caps and goals as of 19:13, 3 February 2025 (UTC)

Dennis Kaygın (born 2 April 2004) is a German professional footballer who plays as a midfielder for 3. Liga club FC Ingolstadt.

== Club career ==
Kaygın is a product of the youth academies of the German clubs FSV 1946 Saulheim and Mainz 05. In the 2022–23 season, he was the second top scorer for the Mainz U19s with 22 goals in 19 games and helped them win the Under 19 Bundesliga.

On 9 June 2023, he transferred to the Austrian club Rapid Wien on a three-year contract. He made his senior and professional debut with Rapid Wien as a substitute in a 1–0 loss to Red Bull Salzburg on 9 December 2023. On 10 January 2025, he joined the Dutch Eredivisie club Willem II on loan for the second half of the 2024–25 season.

On 24 June 2025, Kaygın signed with FC Ingolstadt in 3. Liga.

== International career ==
Born in Germany, Kaygın is of Turkish and Swedish descent and holds all three citizenships. He played up to the Germany U19s in 2022. On 8 November 2024, he was called up to the Turkey U20s for Under 20 Elite League matches.
