= Antonio Tikvić =

Croatian footballer (born 2004)

Personal information
- Date of birth: 21 April 2004 (age 22)
- Place of birth: Hamburg, Germany
- Height: 1.95 m (6 ft 5 in)
- Position: Centre-back

Team information
- Current team: Preußen Münster
- Number: 4

Youth career
- 2008–2012: FC St. Pauli
- 2012–2015: Hamburger SV
- 2015–2018: FC St. Pauli
- 2018–2019: Niendorfer TSV
- 2019–2021: Eintracht Frankfurt
- 2021–2022: Türkgücü München

Senior career*
Years	Team	Apps	(Gls)
2021–2022	Türkgücü München	5	(0)
2022–2023	Bayern Munich II	18	(1)
2023–2024	Udinese	1	(0)
2024	→ Watford (loan)	0	(0)
2024–2025	Watford	0	(0)
2025	→ Grazer AK (loan)	15	(0)
2025–	Preußen Münster	1	(0)

International career^{‡}
2022	Croatia U18	2	(0)
2022–2023	Croatia U19	5	(0)
2023–	Croatia U21	4	(0)
- * Club domestic league appearances and goals as of 1 August 2025 ‡ National team caps and goals as of 20:58, 12 December 2023 (UTC)

Antonio Tikvić (born 21 April 2004) is a professional footballer who plays as a centre-back for 2. Bundesliga club Preußen Münster. Born in Germany, he is a youth international for Croatia.

== Career ==
Tikvić is a youth product of the German clubs FC St. Pauli, Hamburger SV, Niendorfer TSV and Eintracht Frankfurt. He began his senior career with Türkgücü München in 2021 in the 3. Liga. On 10 May 2022, he moved to Bayern Munich II in the Regionalliga on a contract until 2025, where he made 18 appearances and scored 1 goal. On 1 September 2023, he transferred to the Serie A club Udinese on a contract until 2028. He made his senior debut with Udinese in a 2–1 Coppa Italia loss in extra time to Cagliari on 12 December 2023.

On 22 July 2024, Tivkić joined English Championship club Watford on a season-long loan deal. The loan was made permanent in August 2024, and in January 2025 he moved on loan from Watford to Austrian club Grazer AK.

On 29 July 2025, Tivkić signed for 2. Bundesliga club Preußen Münster for an undisclosed fee. In his debut game for the club against Karlsruher SC, he collided with Lilian Egloff and go down for an injury. It was later revealed that he had torn his anterior cruciate ligament.

== International career ==
Born in Germany, Tikvić is of Croatian descent. He is a youth international for Croatia, having played for the Croatia U21s for a set of 2025 UEFA European Under-21 Championship qualification matches in November 2023.

== Career statistics ==
As of match played 9 January 2025

Appearances and goals by club, season and competition
Club	Season	League			National Cup (Note: Includes FA Cup)		League Cup (Note: Includes EFL Cup)		Other		Total	
Club	Season	Division	Apps	Goals	Apps	Goals	Apps	Goals	Apps	Goals	Apps	Goals
Türkgücü München	2021–22	3. Liga	5	0	0	0	—		—		5	0
Bayern Munich II	2022–23	Regionalliga	14	1	—		—		—		14	1
Bayern Munich II	2023–24	Regionalliga	4	0	—		—		—		4	0
Bayern Munich II	Total		18	1	—		—		—		18	1
Udinese	2023–24	Serie A	1	0	1	0	—		—		2	0
Watford (loan)	2024–25	Championship	0	0	0	0	2	0	—		2	0
Watford	2024–25	Championship	0	0	1	0	0	0	—		1	0
Career total			24	1	2	0	2	0	0	0	32	0
