= Daniel Maderner =

Austrian footballer

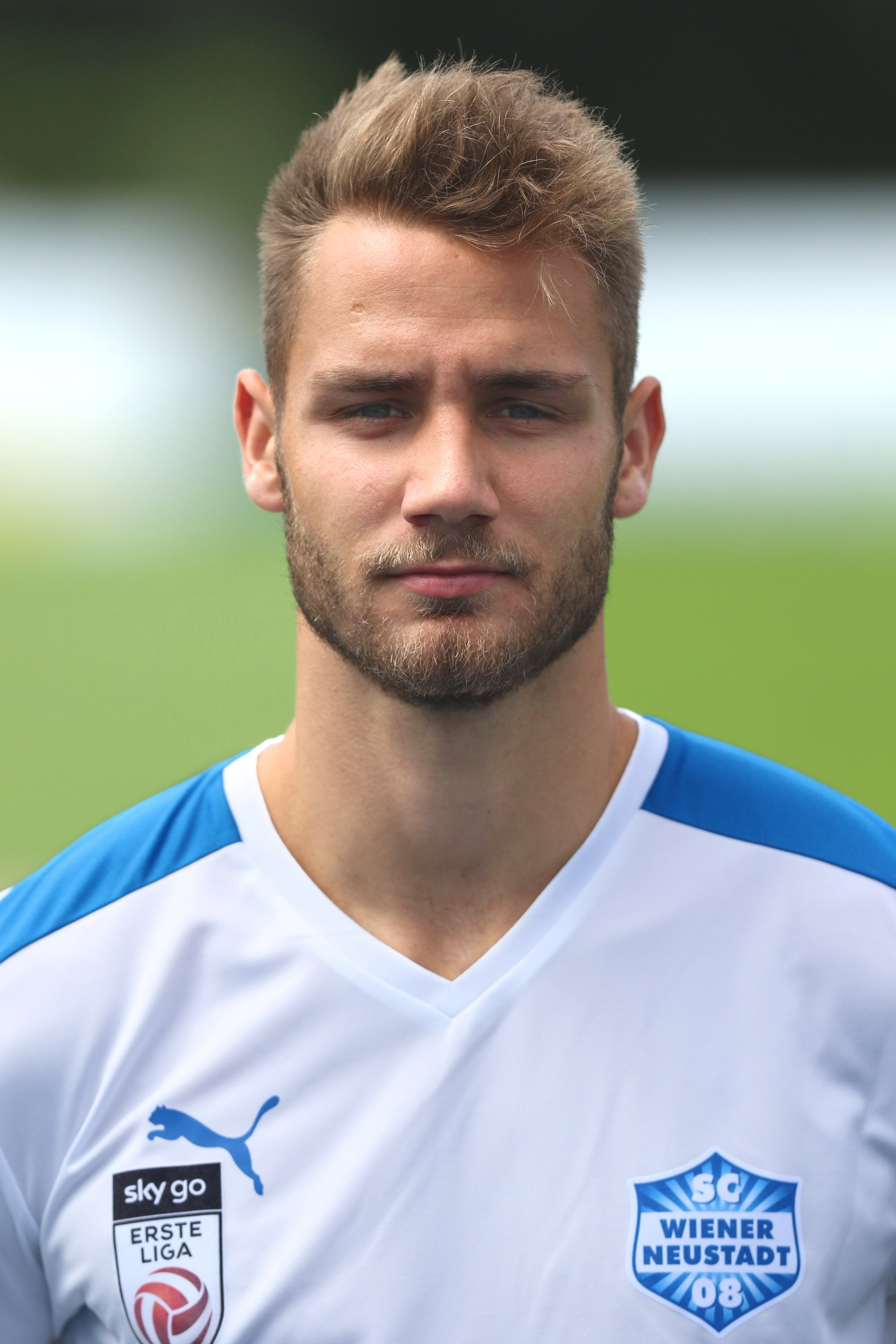

Personal information
- Date of birth: 12 October 1995 (age 31)
- Place of birth: Feldkirch, Austria
- Height: 1.90 m (6 ft 3 in)
- Position: Forward

Team information
- Current team: Grazer AK
- Number: 9

Youth career
- –2009: AKA St. Pölten
- 2009–2013: Wiener Neustadt

Senior career*
Years	Team	Apps	(Gls)
2013–2018	Wiener Neustadt	76	(4)
2014	→ Floridsdorfer AC (loan)	6	(1)
2018–2019	ASK Ebreichsdorf	28	(22)
2019–2020	SKU Amstetten	25	(12)
2020–2021	SC Rheindorf Altach	31	(5)
2021–2023	Beveren	33	(16)
2023–	Grazer AK	80	(31)

International career
2013	Austria U18	1	(0)
2013–2014	Austria U19	7	(1)
2014–2015	Austria U21	4	(0)
- * Club domestic league appearances and goals as of 10 June 2026

Daniel Maderner (born 12 October 1995) is an Austrian professional footballer who plays for Grazer AK as a forward.

== Career ==
He made his Bundesliga debut at 10 August 2013 against SV Ried. He came in the field for Thomas Pichlmann in the extra-time.

On 22 July 2020 he signed with SC Rheindorf Altach.

On 23 June 2021, he joined Waasland-Beveren in Belgium. In his first season, he finished as the top scorer in the Challenger Pro League.

On 23 June 2023, Maderner returned to Austria and joined Grazer AK.
