= Michael Lang (footballer, born 1998) =

Austrian footballer

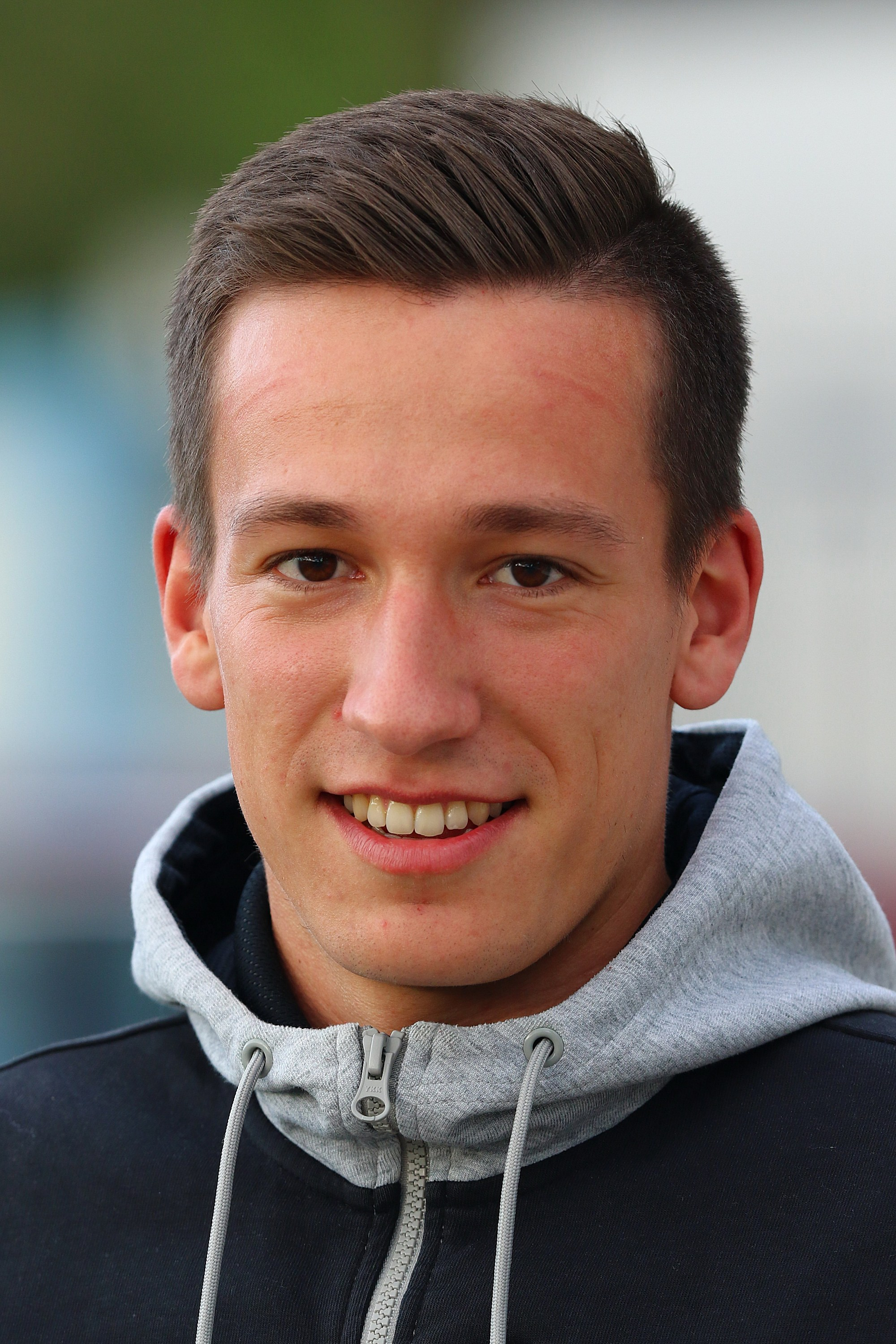

Personal information
- Date of birth: 4 July 1998 (age 28)
- Place of birth: Graz, Austria
- Height: 1.78 m (5 ft 10 in)
- Position: Defender

Team information
- Current team: Austria Klagenfurt
- Number: 30

Youth career
- 2004–2009: LUV Graz
- 2009–2010: Grazer AK
- 2010: AKA HIB Liebenau
- 2010–2013: Grazer AK
- 2013–2015: AKA HIB Liebenau
- 2014–2015: Sturm Graz

Senior career*
Years	Team	Apps	(Gls)
2015–2017	USV Allerheiligen	43	(5)
2017–2018	Austria Lustenau	8	(0)
2018–2021	Kapfenberger SV	61	(5)
2021–2022	SKN St. Pölten	28	(0)
2022–2025	Grazer AK	58	(3)
2025	→ Kapfenberger SV (loan)	13	(1)
2025–	Austria Klagenfurt	8	(1)
- * Club domestic league appearances and goals as of 5 October 2025

Michael Lang (born 4 July 1998) is an Austrian professional footballer who plays for Austria Klagenfurt as a defender.

== Club career ==
Lang made his Austrian Football First League debut for SC Austria Lustenau on 4 August 2017 in a game against SC Wiener Neustadt.

On 22 June 2021, he moved to SKN St. Pölten on a two-year contract.

On 4 February 2025, Lang returned to Kapfenberger SV on loan.

On 7 August 2025, Lang signed for Austria Klagenfurt.
