= 2023–24 Austrian Football Second League =

48th season of the Austrian second-level football league

Austrian Football Second League
- Season: 2023–24
- Dates: 27 July 2023 – 25 May 2024
- Champions: Grazer AK
- Promoted: Grazer AK
- Relegated: DSV Leoben; Mohren Dornbirn
- Matches: 240
- Goals: 716 (2.98 per match)
- Top goalscorer: Dario Tadic; Deni Alar (16)
- Biggest home win: Leoben 6–0 Mohren Dornbirn; 11 November 2023
- Biggest away win: Mohren Dornbirn 0–5 SW Bregenz; 26 August 2023; Lafnitz 1–6 Liefering; 25 November 2023; Sturm Graz II 0–5 Guntamatic Ried; 6 December 2023
- Highest scoring: First Vienna 7–3 St. Pölten 5 April 2024
- Longest winning run: Leoben (6)
- Longest unbeaten run: Leoben (11)
- Longest winless run: Amstetten (16)
- Longest losing run: Mohren Dornbirn (11)
- All statistics correct as of Season Complete.

The 2023–24 Austrian Football Second League known as the Admiral 2nd League for sponsorship purposes, was the 50th season of the Austrian second-level football league and the sixth as the Second League. The league consists of 16 teams.

Grazer AK spent the majority of the season in the top position on the table, clinching the championship with weeks to spare and ensuring a promotion to the 2024-25 Austrian Bundesliga. DSV Leoben, Mohren Dornbirn were all relegated to the Austrian Regionalliga.

== Teams ==
Sixteen teams participated in the 2023–24 season. Ried was relegated from the 2022–23 Austrian Football Bundesliga, replacing the 2022–23 2nd League Champions Blau-Weiß Linz, while Leoben (Regionalliga Mitte), SW Bregenz (Regionalliga West) and SV Stripfing (Regionalliga Ost) were promoted from the third tier to replace the three relegated squads, Vorwärts Steyr, Rapid II and AW II.

SV Stripfing played in 2nd League for the first time in history from this season and finished one spot out of relegation, securing its spot in the 2023-24 2. Liga.

Location of teams in the 2023–24 Austrian Football Second League

Club Name	City	Stadium	Capacity
DSV Leoben	Leoben	Donawitz Stadium	8,450
First Vienna FC	Vienna	Hohe Warte Stadium	5,500
Floridsdorfer AC	Vienna	FAC-Platz	3,000
Flyeralarm Admira	Maria Enzersdorf	motion invest Arena	10,600
Grazer AK	Graz	Merkur-Arena	15,323
Guntamatic Ried	Ried im Innkreis	Josko Arena	7,680
Kapfenberger SV	Kapfenberg	Franz Fekete Stadium	10,000
FC Liefering	Salzburg	Untersberg-Arena	4,128
Mohren Dornbirn	Dornbirn	Stadion Birkenwiese	7,500
Sturm Graz II	Graz	Merkur Arena	16,364
SKN St. Pölten	Sankt Pölten	NV Arena	8,000
SKU Amstetten	Amstetten	Ertl Glas Stadion	2,000
SV Horn	Horn	Sparkasse Horn Arena	7,870
SV Lafnitz	Lafnitz	Sportplatz Lafnitz	3,000
SV Stripfing	Weikendorf	Sportplatz Stripfing	500
SW Bregenz	Bregenz	ImmoAgentur Stadion	12,000

== League table ==
Pos	Team	Pld	W	D	L	GF	GA	GD	Pts	Promotion or relegation
1	Grazer AK (C, P)	30	21	6	3	57	27	+30	69	Promotion to 2024–25 Austrian Football Bundesliga
2	Guntamatic Ried	30	18	5	7	67	22	+45	59	
3	First Vienna FC	30	15	6	9	52	39	+13	51	
4	DSV Leoben (Note: DSV Leoben was not granted admission to the 2nd division in the first and second instance. The club then appealed to the league's permanent neutral arbitration tribunal, where it also failed. As no other club from the Regionalliga West that had applied for a second division licence was granted, Amstetten remained in the league and the number of relegated teams was reduced to two. Dornbirn also failed to gain admission to the 2nd division and was relegated together with Leoben.) (R)	30	15	6	9	47	31	+16	51	Relegation to 2024–25 Austrian Football Regionalliga
5	Floridsdorfer AC	30	13	10	7	45	33	+12	49	
6	FC Liefering	30	13	8	9	51	40	+11	47	
7	Flyeralarm Admira	30	13	8	9	42	31	+11	47	
8	SV Horn	30	13	2	15	40	48	−8	41	
9	SKN St. Pölten	30	12	4	14	46	52	−6	40	
10	Licht-Loidl Lafnitz	30	11	4	15	48	57	−9	37	
11	SW Bregenz	30	11	6	13	38	45	−7	36 (Note: SW Bregenz were deducted 3 points and fined €25,000 for fielding three Brazilians without a work permission and not paying them directly by the club.)	
12	Kapfenberger SV	30	9	8	13	42	54	−12	35	
13	SV Stripfing	30	10	5	15	40	58	−18	35	
14	Mohren Dornbirn (R)	30	10	3	17	32	51	−19	33	Relegation to 2024–25 Austrian Football Regionalliga
15	Sturm Graz II	30	5	8	17	39	67	−28	23	
16	Ertl Glas Amstetten	30	3	7	20	30	61	−31	16	

Source: 2.Liga Table
Rules for classification: 1) Points; 2) Direct Duel; 3) Goal difference; 4) Goals scored; 5) Matches won; 6) Away matches won; 7) Away goals scored
(C) Champions; (P) Promoted; (R) Relegated

== Results ==
Home \ Away	AMS	ADM	BRE	DOR	FAC	FVI	GAK	HOR	KAP	LAF	LEO	LIE	RIE	STP	STR	STU
SKU Amstetten	—	1–3	1–2	0–1	3–2	1–3	1–3	1–1	1–1	1–2	0–1	1–1	2–3	0–1	1–1	1–4
Admira Wacker	3–1	—	1–3	1–0	0–0	0–3	0–0	1–0	1–0	1–0	2–0	0–0	3–2	2–2	1–0	1–1
SW Bregenz	0–1	1–0	—	1–4	0–2	2–0	0–3	3–1	0–2	2–1	0–0	1–1	0–0	2–3	0–2	3–3
FC Dornbirn	1–0	1–0	0–5	—	1–2	1–0	0–1	4–0	1–3	0–2	2–1	1–2	0–2	3–1	1–3	2–3
Floridsdorfer AC	0–0	3–2	1–2	1–1	—	1–0	0–0	0–1	0–0	3–0	0–2	3–1	1–1	2–1	2–0	1–0
First Vienna FC	4–1	2–1	1–2	0–0	2–2	—	2–3	1–2	4–2	2–0	1–0	2–0	2–1	7–3	1–0	2–2
Grazer AK	3–0	1–0	1–0	3–0	1–3	2–2	—	1–1	4–2	1–1	1–1	3–0	1–0	3–1	3–0	1–0
SV Horn	3–1	1–0	1–0	3–0	2–3	2–0	1–2	—	0–2	2–1	0–3	2–1	0–2	1–3	2–1	4–0
Kapfenberger SV	4–2	1–1	1–3	3–2	1–1	0–0	2–3	1–3	—	2–4	2–1	1–3	1–3	0–3	3–1	1–1
SV Lafnitz	2–2	1–3	3–0	1–0	2–1	2–3	4–1	2–0	3–0	—	2–3	1–6	0–4	0–1	0–3	5–2
DSV Leoben	1–0	3–2	2–0	6–0	0–4	0–1	1–2	3–2	0–0	1–1	—	1–2	1–0	0–0	4–0	2–1
FC Liefering	2–2	1–1	2–1	0–1	4–1	0–1	2–0	2–1	0–1	4–3	2–2	—	1–1	3–1	1–2	4–1
Guntamatic Ried	3–0	2–2	5–0	1–0	0–2	4–1	0–1	5–0	2–0	5–0	2–0	3–2	—	1–1	5–0	1–0
SKN St. Pölten	3–1	0–3	2–2	2–0	2–0	1–2	1–3	0–2	2–0	2–0	1–2	0–1	0–4	—	1–2	3–1
SV Stripfing	0–2	0–4	1–1	2–2	2–2	3–2	2–5	3–1	2–3	1–1	1–4	1–2	1–0	4–1	—	2–1
SK Sturm Graz II	3–2	1–3	0–2	2–3	2–2	1–1	0–1	2–1	3–3	1–4	0–2	1–1	0–5	1–4	2–0	—

Source: soccerway.com
Legend: Blue = home team win; Yellow = draw; Red = away team win.

== Positions by round ==
Team ╲ Round	1	2	3	4	5	6	7	8	9	10	11	12	13	14	15	16	17	18	19	20	21	22	23	24	25	26	27	28	29	30
Grazer AK	2	3	2	1	2	2	1	1	1	1	1	1	1	1	1	1	1	1	1	1	1	1	1	1	1	1	1	1	1	1
Guntamatic Ried	8	9	13	11	10	13	9	10	8	6	4	4	5	5	3	3	4	4	4	4	4	2	2	2	2	2	2	2	2	2
First Vienna FC	13	11	15	15	14	11	7	8	6	8	10	8	8	8	5	7	7	7	9	9	10	8	8	7	8	8	6	6	4	3
DSV Leoben	5	2	1	3	5	6	10	13	13	12	11	9	10	9	6	5	3	3	2	3	2	3	3	3	3	3	3	3	5	4
Floridsdorfer AC	9	10	10	5	9	5	4	4	4	5	6	5	4	7	4	2	2	2	3	2	3	4	5	4	4	4	4	4	3	5
FC Liefering	11	14	12	8	7	10	14	14	14	15	15	15	13	13	13	13	13	13	12	12	11	11	9	6	6	6	7	7	7	6
Admira Wacker	7	5	3	4	3	4	6	7	9	10	9	11	11	11	12	11	8	10	10	8	6	6	4	5	5	5	5	5	6	7
SV Horn	10	7	8	6	11	7	11	6	10	11	12	12	12	12	10	12	12	11	8	7	9	7	7	9	7	7	8	8	8	8
SKN St. Pölten	1	1	4	2	1	1	2	2	3	4	7	10	6	3	8	6	5	6	5	5	5	5	6	8	9	9	10	10	9	9
SV Lafnitz	3	6	6	9	6	8	5	5	5	7	8	6	9	10	11	10	11	8	7	10	7	9	10	10	10	10	9	9	10	10
SW Bregenz	4	4	5	10	4	3	3	3	2	2	2	2	2	2	2	4	6	5	6	6	8	10	11	11	11	11	13	13	13	11
Kapfenberger SV	16	13	7	13	13	9	13	9	11	9	5	7	7	6	9	8	9	9	11	11	12	12	12	12	13	12	11	11	11	12
SV Stripfing	12	16	11	12	8	12	8	11	7	3	3	3	3	4	7	9	10	12	13	13	13	13	13	13	12	13	12	12	12	13
FC Dornbirn	6	8	9	7	12	14	12	12	12	14	14	14	15	15	15	15	15	15	15	15	14	14	14	14	14	14	14	14	14	14
SK Sturm Graz II	14	12	14	14	15	15	15	15	15	13	13	13	14	14	14	14	14	14	14	14	15	15	15	15	15	15	15	15	15	15
SKU Amstetten	15	15	16	16	16	16	16	16	16	16	16	16	16	16	16	16	16	16	16	16	16	16	16	16	16	16	16	16	16	16

Promotion to Austrian Bundesliga
Relegation to Austrian Regionalliga

Source: 2liga.at

== Results by round ==
Team ╲ Round	1	2	3	4	5	6	7	8	9	10	11	12	13	14	15	16	17	18	19	20	21	22	23	24	25	26	27	28	29	30
SKU Amstetten	L	L	L	D	L	L	L	L	L	L	D	D	D	L	L	L	W	L	W	L	L	L	D	L	L	W	L	D	D	L
Admira Wacker	W	D	W	L	W	D	L	D	D	D	D	L	W	L	L	W	W	L	W	W	W	D	W	W	D	L	W	W	L	L
SW Bregenz	W	W	L	L	W	W	W	D	W	L	W	D	D	L	W	W	L	W	D	L	L	D	L	L	L	L	L	L	D	W
FC Dornbirn	W	L	L	W	L	L	W	D	L	L	L	L	L	L	L	L	L	L	L	W	W	W	W	D	W	L	D	W	W	L
Floridsdorfer AC	D	D	D	W	L	W	W	W	L	D	D	W	L	W	W	W	D	W	L	W	L	D	L	W	W	L	D	W	D	D
First Vienna FC	L	D	L	L	W	W	W	D	W	D	L	W	D	W	W	L	D	D	L	W	L	W	L	W	L	W	W	W	W	W
Grazer AK	W	W	W	W	L	W	W	W	W	W	D	W	W	L	W	W	W	D	W	D	W	D	L	W	W	W	D	W	D	W
SV Horn	L	W	L	W	L	W	L	W	L	L	L	L	W	W	W	L	L	W	W	W	L	W	L	L	W	W	D	L	D	L
Kapfenberger SV	L	D	W	L	D	W	L	W	D	W	W	D	D	W	L	L	D	L	L	D	D	L	W	L	L	W	W	L	L	L
SV Lafnitz	W	L	W	L	W	L	W	W	L	D	L	W	L	L	L	W	L	W	W	D	W	L	D	L	L	D	W	L	L	L
DSV Leoben	W	W	W	L	L	L	L	L	D	D	W	W	D	W	W	W	W	W	W	L	D	D	W	L	W	D	L	W	L	W
FC Liefering	L	L	W	W	D	L	L	L	D	D	D	L	D	L	W	W	W	W	D	L	W	W	W	W	D	W	L	D	W	W
Guntamatic Ried	D	D	L	W	D	L	W	D	W	W	W	D	W	W	W	L	L	W	L	W	L	W	W	W	W	L	W	W	W	W
SKN St. Pölten	W	W	L	W	W	W	L	D	L	L	L	D	W	W	L	W	W	L	W	L	W	L	L	L	L	D	L	L	D	W
SV Stripfing	L	L	W	D	W	L	W	L	W	W	W	D	L	W	L	L	L	L	L	L	W	L	L	D	W	D	W	L	L	D
SK Sturm Graz II	L	D	D	L	D	D	L	L	W	W	D	L	L	L	L	L	D	L	L	D	L	D	W	W	L	L	L	L	W	L

Source: 2liga.at
W = Win; D = Draw; L = Lose

== Season statistics ==
=== Top scorers ===
As of Complete

Rank	Player	Club	Goals
1	(Austria) Dario Tadic	St. Pölten	16
1	(Austria) Deni Alar	Leoben	16
2	(Austria) Daniel Maderner	Grazer AK	15
4	(Germany) André Leipold	Lafnitz	13
4	(Austria) Mark Große	SV Guntamatic Ried	13
6	(Austria) Lukas Brückler	Schwarz-Weiß Bregenz	11
6	(Ivory Coast) Wilfried Eza	SV Guntamatic Ried	11
8	(Ghana) Kelvin Boateng	First Vienna	10
8	(Croatia) Darijo Pecirep	Stripfing	10
8	(Austria) Christoph Monschein	First Vienna	10
8	(Austria) Marco Hausjell	Horn	10
8	(Austria) David Peham	First Vienna	10

== Attendances ==
#	Club	Average
1	GAK	5,626
2	Ried	3,274
3	First Vienna	1,881
4	St. Pölten	1,549
5	Leoben	1,461
6	Admira	1,251
7	Amstetten	862
8	Bregenz	831
9	Dornbirn	818
10	Kapfenberg	753
11	FAC	738
12	Lafnitz	508
13	Sturm Graz II	463
14	Horn	400
15	Liefering	298
16	Stripfing	195

== See also ==
- 2023–24 Austrian Football Bundesliga
- 2023–24 Austrian Cup
