= 2022–23 WSG Tirol season =

WSG Tirol
2022–23 season
- President: Diana Langes-Swarovski
- Manager: Thomas Silberberger
- Stadium: Tivoli-Neu
- Austrian Football Bundesliga: 5th
- Austrian Cup: Third round
- Top goalscorer: League: Nik Prelec (6); All: Nik Prelec (6)
- Biggest win: Hartberg 1–5 WSG Tirol
- Biggest defeat: WSG Tirol 0–5 Rapid Wien
Home colours
- All statistics correct as of 12 November 2022.

The 2022–23 season is the 93rd in the history of WSG Tirol and their fourth consecutive season in the top flight. The club are participating in the Austrian Football Bundesliga and the Austrian Cup.

== Players ==
=== First team squad ===
As of 26 September 2022

Note: Flags indicate national team as defined under FIFA eligibility rules; some limited exceptions apply. Players may hold more than one non-FIFA nationality.

| No. | Pos. | Nation | Player |
|---|---|---|---|
| 1 | GK | AUT | Paul Schermer |
| 4 | MF | AUT | Valentino Müller |
| 5 | DF | AUT | Felix Bacher |
| 6 | DF | AUT | Lukas Sulzbacher |
| 7 | FW | AUT | Thomas Sabitzer (on loan from LASK) |
| 8 | MF | AUT | Kilian Bauernfeind |
| 9 | FW | SLO | Nik Prelec |
| 10 | MF | DEN | Bror Blume |
| 11 | FW | ARG | Lautaro Rinaldi |
| 13 | GK | AUT | Benjamin Ozegovic |
| 14 | MF | AUT | Alexander Ranacher |
| 16 | DF | AUT | Osarenren Okungbowa |
| 17 | MF | AUT | Johannes Naschberger |
| 18 | FW | AUT | Denis Tomic |
| 19 | FW | AUT | Justin Forst |

| No. | Pos. | Nation | Player |
|---|---|---|---|
| 20 | MF | AUT | Cem Üstündag |
| 21 | MF | SLO | Žan Rogelj |
| 22 | MF | AUT | Florian Tipotsch |
| 23 | MF | AUT | Stefan Skrbo |
| 25 | GK | GER | Ferdinand Oswald |
| 26 | DF | CRO | Dominik Štumberger |
| 27 | DF | AUT | David Jaunegg |
| 28 | FW | AUT | Thomas Geris |
| 30 | DF | AUT | Raffael Behounek |
| 33 | FW | SWE | Tim Prica (on loan from Aalborg) |
| 35 | GK | ITA | Simon Beccari |
| 44 | DF | GER | Kofi Schulz |
| 77 | MF | AUT | Julius Ertlthaler |
| 98 | MF | SLO | Sandi Ogrinec |

== Pre-season and friendlies ==
Win Draw Loss Fixtures

| 25 June 2022 Friendly | SC Kirchberg (Austria) | 1–14 | (Austria) WSG Tirol | Kirchberg in Tirol |
| 17:00 CEST (UTC+2) | | | | Stadium: Kunstrasen Kirchberg |

| 3 July 2022 Friendly | WSG Tirol (Austria) | 2–0 | (Germany) 1. FC Nürnberg | Rum |
| 15:00 CEST (UTC+2) | | | | Stadium: Sportzentrum Rum |

| 9 July 2022 Friendly | WSG Tirol (Austria) | 1–7 | (Germany) VfL Wolfsburg | Wattens |
| 17:30 CEST (UTC+2) | Prica 26' | | Waldschmidt 14', 32'; Philipp 16'; Rexhbeçaj 60'; Wind 72'; Steffen 75', 79' | Stadium: Gernot Langes Stadion |

| 12 July 2022 Friendly | Wörgl (Austria) | 1–10 | (Austria) WSG Tirol | Wörgl |
| 19:00 CEST (UTC+2) | | | | Stadium: Sportstadion Wörgl |

| 17 July 2022 Friendly | WSG Tirol (Austria) | 0–4 | (Qatar) Al-Duhail | Austria |
| 17:00 CEST (UTC+2) |

| 22 September 2022 Friendly | WSG Tirol (Austria) | 0–1 | (Germany) 1860 Munich | Wörgl |
| 18:30 CEST (UTC+2) | | | | Stadium: Sportstadion Wörgl |

| 24 September 2022 Friendly | Kramsach / Brandenberg (Austria) | 0–16 | (Austria) WSG Tirol | Kramsach |
| 17:00 CEST (UTC+2) | | | | Stadium: Kunstrasen Kramsach Ländarena |

| 24 November 2022 Friendly | Austria Lustenau | 4–3 | (Austria) WSG Tirol | Lustenau |
| 17:30 CET (UTC+1) | | | | Stadium: Reichshofstadion |

| 1 December 2022 Friendly | WSG Tirol (Austria) | v | (Austria) Blau-Weiß Linz | Wattens |
| 14:30 CET (UTC+1) | | | | Stadium: Gernot Langes Stadion |

== Competitions ==
=== Overall record ===
| Competition | First match | Last match | Starting round | Final position | Record | | | | | | | |
| Competition | First match | Last match | Starting round | Final position | Pld | W | D | L | GF | GA | GD | Win % |
|---|---|---|---|---|---|---|---|---|---|---|---|---|
| Austrian Football Bundesliga | 24 July 2022 | | Matchday 1 | | 16 | 7 | 3 | 6 | 27 | 26 | +1 | 43.75 |
| Austrian Cup | 15 July 2022 | 18 October 2022 | First round | Third round | 3 | 2 | 0 | 1 | 9 | 5 | +4 | 66.67 |
| Total | | | | | 19 | 9 | 3 | 7 | 36 | 31 | +5 | 47.37 |

Last updated: 12 November 2022
Source: Soccerway

=== Austrian Football Bundesliga ===
==== League table ====
| Pos | Team | Pld | W | D | L | GF | GA | GD | Pts | Qualification |
|---|---|---|---|---|---|---|---|---|---|---|
| 5 | Austria Wien | 22 | 10 | 5 | 7 | 37 | 31 | +6 | 32 (Note: Austria Wien were deducted 3 points due to license violation.) | Qualification for the Championship round |
| 6 | Austria Klagenfurt | 22 | 9 | 3 | 10 | 35 | 40 | −5 | 30 | Qualification for the Championship round |
| 7 | WSG Tirol | 22 | 8 | 4 | 10 | 32 | 37 | −5 | 28 | Qualification for the Relegation round |
| 8 | Austria Lustenau | 22 | 7 | 6 | 9 | 29 | 37 | −8 | 27 | Qualification for the Relegation round |
| 9 | Wolfsberger AC | 22 | 6 | 3 | 13 | 35 | 41 | −6 | 21 | Qualification for the Relegation round |

Source: Austrian Football Bundesliga
Rules for classification: 1) Points; 2) Head-to-head record; 3) Goal difference; 4) Goals scored; 5) Matches won; 6) Away matches won; 7) Away goals scored.
Notes:

| Pos | Team | Pld | W | D | L | GF | GA | GD | Pts | Qualification | RBS | STU | LIN | RWI | AWI | KLA |
|---|---|---|---|---|---|---|---|---|---|---|---|---|---|---|---|---|
| 1 | Red Bull Salzburg (C) | 32 | 23 | 8 | 1 | 67 | 22 | +45 | 49 | Qualification for the Champions League group stage | — | 2–1 | 0–0 | 2–1 | 3–3 | 3–2 |
| 2 | Sturm Graz | 32 | 20 | 6 | 6 | 57 | 29 | +28 | 42 | Qualification for the Champions League third qualifying round | 0–2 | — | 2–0 | 3–1 | 3–2 | 4–1 |
| 3 | LASK | 32 | 14 | 12 | 6 | 54 | 38 | +16 | 35 | Qualification for the Europa League play-off round | 0–1 | 2–1 | — | 3–1 | 3–1 | 4–0 |
| 4 | Rapid Wien | 32 | 12 | 6 | 14 | 50 | 47 | +3 | 25 | Qualification for the Europa Conference League third qualifying round | 1–1 | 3–2 | 1–1 | — | 3–3 | 3–1 |
| 5 | Austria Wien (O) | 32 | 11 | 10 | 11 | 55 | 52 | +3 | 24 | Qualification for the Europa Conference League play-offs | 1–1 | 1–2 | 2–2 | 3–1 | — | 1–2 |
| 6 | Austria Klagenfurt | 32 | 11 | 5 | 16 | 45 | 63 | −18 | 23 | | 0–3 | 0–2 | 1–1 | 2–1 | 1–1 | — |

Source: Austrian Football Bundesliga
Legend: Blue = home team win; Yellow = draw; Red = away team win.
Rules for classification: 1) Points; 2) Points with (possible) half points subtracted due to rounding; 3) Head-to-head points; 4) Head-to-head goal difference; 5) Head-to-head goals scored; 6) Head-to-head away goals scored; 7) Goal difference; 8) Goals scored; 9) Matches won; 10) Away matches won; 11) Away goals scored.
(C) Champions; (O) Play-off winners

| Pos | Team | Pld | W | D | L | GF | GA | GD | Pts | Qualification | WOL | LUS | WAT | HAR | ALT | RIE |
|---|---|---|---|---|---|---|---|---|---|---|---|---|---|---|---|---|
| 1 | Wolfsberger AC | 32 | 12 | 6 | 14 | 51 | 51 | 0 | 31 | Qualification for the Europa Conference League play-offs | — | 2–2 | 2–0 | 2–2 | 0–0 | 1–0 |
| 2 | Austria Lustenau | 32 | 11 | 10 | 11 | 50 | 54 | −4 | 29 | Qualification for the Europa Conference League play-offs | 1–3 | — | 2–4 | 5–1 | 1–0 | 2–2 |
| 3 | WSG Tirol | 32 | 10 | 8 | 14 | 44 | 53 | −9 | 24 | | 4–0 | 0–2 | — | 1–1 | 1–1 | 1–1 |
| 4 | Hartberg | 32 | 9 | 6 | 17 | 39 | 56 | −17 | 24 | | 0–2 | 0–1 | 5–0 | — | 2–2 | 2–0 |
| 5 | Rheindorf Altach | 32 | 6 | 10 | 16 | 29 | 53 | −24 | 19 | | 0–2 | 1–1 | 1–0 | 0–1 | — | 1–1 |
| 6 | Ried (R) | 32 | 4 | 11 | 17 | 27 | 50 | −23 | 14 | Relegation to Austrian Football Second League | 1–2 | 4–4 | 1–1 | 1–3 | 0–1 | — |

Legend: Blue = home team win; Yellow = draw; Red = away team win.
Rules for classification: 1) Points; 2) Points with (possible) half points subtracted due to rounding; 3) Head-to-head points; 4) Head-to-head goal difference; 5) Head-to-head goals scored; 6) Head-to-head away goals scored; 7) Goal difference; 8) Goals scored; 9) Matches won; 10) Away matches won; 11) Away goals scored.
(R) Relegated

==== Results summary ====
| Overall | | | | | | | | Home | | | | | | Away | | | | | |
| Pld | W | D | L | GF | GA | GD | Pts | W | D | L | GF | GA | GD | W | D | L | GF | GA | GD |
|---|---|---|---|---|---|---|---|---|---|---|---|---|---|---|---|---|---|---|---|
| 0 | 0 | 0 | 0 | 0 | 0 | 0 | 0 | 0 | 0 | 0 | 0 | 0 | 0 | 0 | 0 | 0 | 0 | 0 | 0 |

Last updated: 31 July 2022.
Source: Austrian Football Bundesliga

==== Results by round ====
| Round | 1 |
|---|---|
| Ground | |
| Result | |
| Position | |

Updated to match(es) played on 31 July 2022. Source: Austrian Football Bundesliga
A = Away; H = Home; W = Win; D = Draw; L = Loss

==== Matches ====
The league fixtures were announced on 22 June 2022.
