= 2023–24 WSG Tirol season =

WSG Tirol
2023–24 season
- Manager: Thomas Silberberger
- Stadium: Tivoli Stadion Tirol
- Austrian Football Bundesliga: Ongoing
- Austrian Cup: Second round
- Top goalscorer: League: Nik Prelec (5); All: Nik Prelec (6)

The 2023–24 WSG Tirol season is the club's 94th season in existence and its fifth consecutive season in the top flight of Austrian football. In addition to the domestic league, WSG Tirol will participate in this season's edition of the Austrian Cup. The season covers the period from 1 July 2023 to 30 June 2024.

== Players ==
=== First-team squad ===
As of 29 September 2023

Note: Flags indicate national team as defined under FIFA eligibility rules; some limited exceptions apply. Players may hold more than one non-FIFA nationality.

No.	Pos.	Nation	Player
1	GK	AUT	Paul Schermer
3	DF	AUT	David Gugganig
4	MF	AUT	Valentino Müller
5	DF	AUT	Felix Bacher
6	DF	AUT	Lukas Sulzbacher
7	FW	AUT	Luca Kronberger (on loan from Sturm Graz)
8	FW	MLI	Mahamadou Diarra
9	FW	SLO	Nik Prelec (on loan from Cagliari)
10	MF	DEN	Bror Blume
11	FW	POL	Aleksander Buksa (on loan from Genoa)
13	GK	AUT	Benjamin Ozegovic
14	MF	AUT	Alexander Ranacher
17	MF	AUT	Johannes Naschberger
18	FW	AUT	Denis Tomic

No.	Pos.	Nation	Player
19	FW	AUT	Justin Forst
20	MF	AUT	Cem Üstündag
21	FW	AUT	Yannick Vötter
22	DF	AUT	Osarenren Okungbowa
23	MF	AUT	Stefan Skrbo
25	GK	GER	Ferdinand Oswald
26	DF	CRO	Dominik Štumberger
27	DF	AUT	David Jaunegg
28	FW	AUT	Thomas Geris
30	MF	AUT	Matthäus Taferner
40	GK	CZE	Adam Stejskal
44	DF	GER	Kofi Schulz
77	MF	AUT	Julius Ertlthaler
98	MF	SLO	Sandi Ogrinec

== Transfers ==
=== In ===
Pos.	Player	Transferred from	Fee	Date	Source

=== Out ===
Pos.	Player	Transferred to	Fee	Date	Source

== Pre-season and friendlies ==
Win Draw Loss Fixtures

14 October 2023 Friendly	FC Südtirol (Italy)	0–0	(Austria) WSG Tirol
15:00

17 November 2023 Friendly	SW Bregenz (Austria)	0–6	(Austria) WSG Tirol
13:30

== Competitions ==
=== Overview ===
Competition	First match	Last match	Starting round	Record							
Competition	First match	Last match	Starting round	Pld	W	D	L	GF	GA	GD	Win %
Austrian Football Bundesliga	July 2023	May 2024	Matchday 1	0	0	0	0	0	0	+0	—
Austrian Cup	22 July 2023		First round	0	0	0	0	0	0	+0	—
Total				0	0	0	0	0	0	+0	—

Last updated: 9 December 2023
Source: Soccerway

=== Austrian Football Bundesliga ===
==== League table ====
Pos	Team	Pld	W	D	L	GF	GA	GD	Pts	Qualification
8	Wolfsberger AC	22	8	6	8	29	32	−3	30	Qualification for the Relegation round
9	SCR Altach	22	4	7	11	17	30	−13	19	Qualification for the Relegation round
10	Blau-Weiß Linz	22	4	7	11	22	38	−16	19	Qualification for the Relegation round
11	WSG Tirol	22	4	2	16	20	42	−22	14	Qualification for the Relegation round
12	Austria Lustenau	22	2	4	16	13	49	−36	10	Qualification for the Relegation round

Source: Austrian Football Bundesliga
Rules for classification: 1) Points; 2) Head-to-head record; 3) Goal difference; 4) Goals scored; 5) Matches won; 6) Away matches won; 7) Away goals scored.

Pos	Team	Pld	W	D	L	GF	GA	GD	Pts	Qualification	STU	RBS	LASK	RWI	HAR	AKL
1	Sturm Graz (C)	32	19	10	3	56	23	+33	44	Qualification for the Champions League league stage	—	0–1	1–0	1–0	1–1	2–0
2	Red Bull Salzburg	32	20	7	5	74	29	+45	42	Qualification for the Champions League third qualifying round (Note: Since the Europa League winners, Atalanta qualified for the Champions League via league position, Red Bull Salzburg were promoted from the Champions League second qualifying round to the third qualifying round as one of the two teams with the highest coefficient in the second qualifying round.)	2–2	—	7–1	1–1	5–1	4–2
3	LASK	32	14	10	8	43	33	+10	34	Qualification for the Europa League play-off round (Note: The 2023–24 Austrian Cup winners qualified for the Europa League play-off round. Since the cup winners (Sturm Graz) qualified based on league position, the Europa League spot was passed to the third-placed team.)	2–2	3–1	—	5–0	1–3	1–0
4	Rapid Wien	32	11	12	9	47	35	+12	28	Qualification for the Europa League second qualifying round	1–3	2–0	0–0	—	0–3	1–1
5	Hartberg	32	12	9	11	49	52	−3	28	Qualification for the Conference League play-offs	1–3	1–5	1–2	0–3	—	3–2
6	Austria Klagenfurt	32	9	12	11	40	50	−10	22		0–4	4–3	0–2	0–1	2–2	—

Source: Austrian Football Bundesliga
Legend: Blue = home team win; Yellow = draw; Red = away team win.
Rules for classification: 1) Points; 2) Points with (possible) half points subtracted due to rounding; 3) Head-to-head points; 4) Head-to-head goal difference; 5) Head-to-head goals scored; 6) Goal difference; 7) Goals scored; 8) Matches won; 9) Away matches won; 10) Away goals scored.
(C) Champions
Notes:

Pos	Team	Pld	W	D	L	GF	GA	GD	Pts	Qualification	WOL	AWI	BWL	ALT	WAT	LUS
1	Wolfsberger AC	32	12	10	10	41	39	+2	31	Qualification for the Conference League play-offs	—	0–1	0–2	0–0	3–1	1–1
2	Austria Wien (O)	32	12	10	10	35	34	+1	29	Qualification for the Conference League play-offs	0–4	—	0–0	2–2	3–0	1–1
3	Blau-Weiß Linz	32	7	11	14	33	48	−15	22		0–0	1–2	—	2–1	3–2	0–0
4	Rheindorf Altach	32	6	13	13	27	40	−13	21		0–1	1–1	2–2	—	0–0	2–2
5	WSG Tirol	32	7	5	20	29	55	−26	19		1–1	1–0	2–1	0–1	—	0–0
6	Austria Lustenau (R)	32	4	9	19	22	58	−36	16	Relegation to Austrian Football Second League	1–2	2–0	1–0	0–1	1–2	—

Legend: Blue = home team win; Yellow = draw; Red = away team win.
Rules for classification: 1) Points; 2) Points with (possible) half points subtracted due to rounding; 3) Head-to-head points; 4) Head-to-head goal difference; 5) Head-to-head goals scored; 6) Head-to-head away goals scored; 7) Goal difference; 8) Goals scored; 9) Matches won; 10) Away matches won; 11) Away goals scored.
(O) Play-off winners; (R) Relegated

==== Results summary ====
Overall								Home						Away					
Pld	W	D	L	GF	GA	GD	Pts	W	D	L	GF	GA	GD	W	D	L	GF	GA	GD
0	0	0	0	0	0	0	0	0	0	0	0	0	0	0	0	0	0	0	0

Last updated: November 2023.

==== Results by round ====
Round	1
Ground	
Result	
Position	

Updated to match(es) played on November 2023. Source:
A = Away; H = Home; W = Win; D = Draw; L = Loss

==== Matches ====
The league fixtures were unveiled on 27 June 2023.

August 2023 1	v

=== Austrian Cup ===
The draw for the season's first round took place on 25 June.

21 July 2023 First round	SV sedda Bad Schallerbach	v	WSG Tirol
