= 2022–23 Austrian Cup =

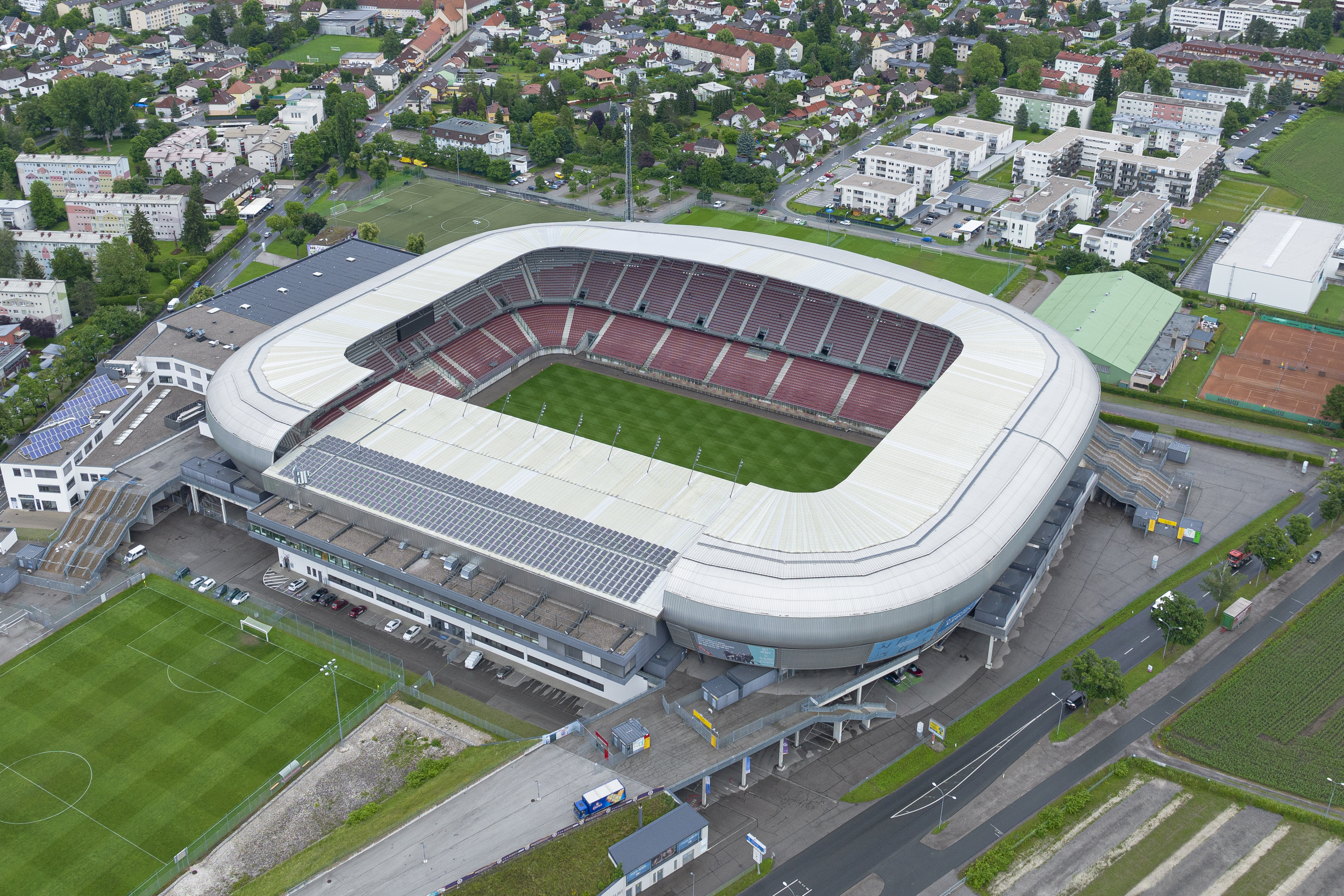
- Wörthersee Stadion will host the final

Tournament details
- Country: Austria
- Teams: 64

Final positions
- Champions: Sturm Graz
- Runners-up: SK Rapid Wien

Tournament statistics
- Matches played: 63
- Goals scored: 253 (4.02 per match)
- Top goal scorer: Manprit Sarkaria (6 goals)

The 2022–23 Austrian Cup was the 92nd edition of the national cup in Austrian football. The final was held on 1 May 2023 in Klagenfurt with Sturm Graz capturing its 6th title with a 2–0 win over SK Rapid Wien. Sturm earned a place in the 2023–24 Europa League play-off round.

Red Bull Salzburg were the defending champions, having defeated SV Ried in the 2022 final.

Match times up to 30 October 2022 and from 26 March 2023 were CEST (UTC+2). Times on interim ("winter") days were CET (UTC+1).

== Round dates ==
The schedule of the competition was as follows.

Round	Match date
Round 1	15–19 July 2022
Round 2	20 August – 1 September 2022
Round 3	18–20 October 2022
Quarter-finals	3–5 February 2023
Semi-finals	4–6 April 2023
Final	1 May 2023 at Wörthersee Stadion, Klagenfurt

== First round ==
Thirty-two first round matches were played between 15 July and 19 July 2022.

Number of teams per tier still in competition
Bundesliga (I)	2. League (II)	Regionalliga (III)	Landesliga (IV)	Unterliga (V)	Total
12 / 12	12 / 12	32 / 32	6 / 6	2 / 2	64 / 64

15 July 2022	SV Opbacher Fuegen (III)	0–3	Red Bull Salzburg (I)	Zell am Ziller
16:30		Report	Šeško 20'; Adamu 75'; Van der Brempt 83'	Stadium: Parkstadion Zell am Ziller; Attendance: 1,500; Referee: Arnes Talic

15 July 2022	SR Donaufeld (III)	0–4	SKU Ertl Glas Amstetten (II)	Vienna
17:30	Linhart (yellow card) 34'; Schneider (yellow card) 66'; Bouguerzi (yellow card) 79'	Report	Mayer 14', 84'; Leimhofer 58'; Schneider 68' (o.g.)	Stadium: Sportsplatz Donaufield; Attendance: 500; Referee: Thomas Fröhlacher

15 July 2022	SC Admira Dornbirn 1946 (III)	1–8	SK Austria Klagenfurt (I)	Dornbirn
18:00	Suleiman (yellow card) 10'; Karahasanovic (yellow card) 13'; Huber 20'		Wernitznig 2'; Cvetko 18', 22'; Mahrer 25'; Pink 53'; Karweina 81'; Arweiler 84'; Rieder 86'	Stadium: Sportsplatz Admira Dornbirn; Attendance: 450; Referee: Christopher Jäger

15 July 2022	SK Treibach (III)	0–1	SK Rapid Wien (I)	Althofen
18:30	Käfer (yellow card) 40'	Report	Schick (yellow card) 53'; Burgstaller 90+4'	Stadium: Turnerwald-Stadion; Attendance: 1,250; Referee: Christian-Petru Ciochirca

15 July 2022	Deutschlandsberger SC “Wonisch Installations” (III)	2–0	USV Scheiblingkirchen/Warth (III)	Deutschlandsberg
19:00	Urdl 4'; Tiasj (yellow card) 15' (goal) 67'; Mestrovic (yellow card) 17'; Lipp (yellow card) 75'	Report	Knaller (yellow card) 71'; Jatic (yellow card) 73'; Hatzl (yellow card) 90'	Stadium: Koralmstadion; Attendance: 350; Referee: Thomas Paukowits

15 July 2022	Sportunion Vöcklamarkt (III)	0–5	FC Mohren Dornbirn 1913 (II)	Vöcklamarkt
19:00	Purkrabek (yellow card) 28'; Preiner (yellow card) 75'	Report	Peixoto Nepomuceno 4', 47' (pen.), 73'; Parger 11'; Favali (yellow card) 34'; Mandl 78'	Stadium: Sportzentrum Union Volksbank Vöcklamarkt; Attendance: 300; Referee: Manuel Baumann

15 July 2022	SAK Klagenfurt (III)	0–3	Wiener Sport-Club (III)	Klagenfurt am Wörthersee
19:00	Vidmar (yellow card) 45'; Angelov (yellow card) 57'; Vukovic (yellow card) 86'; Jakovljevic (yellow card) 90'	Report	Vucenovic 4', 62'; Rajkovic (yellow card) 58' (goal) 71'; Csandl (yellow card) 86'; Buzuk (yellow card) 90'	Stadium: Sportplatz Welzenegg; Attendance: 500; Referee: Dominik Grasser

15 July 2022	ASV Drassburg (III)	0–3	SV Horn (II)	Draßburg
19:00	Puchegger (yellow card) 66'	Report	Pronichev 17', 36'; Mulahalilovic (yellow card) 53'; J. Bauer (yellow card) 65'; S. Bauer (yellow card) 77'; Yilmaz 88'	Stadium: Sportplatz Draßburg; Attendance: 350; Referee: Admir Hasanovic

15 July 2022	DSV Leoben KAIF Energy (III)	1–2	TSV Egger Glas Hartberg (I)	Leoben
19:00	Pfeifer (yellow card) 22'; Hirschhofer 27'; Halili (yellow card) 36'; Eskinja (yellow card) 38'	Report	Aydin 32'; Heil 34' (yellow card) 90+5'; Sonnleitner (yellow card) 65'; Avdijaj (yellow card) 67'	Stadium: Stadion Donawitz; Attendance: Jakob Semler; Referee: 2,400

15 July 2022	SC Neusiedl am See 1919 (III)	1–3 (a.e.t.)	WSG Tirol (I)	Neusiedl am See
19:00	Wodicka (yellow card) 41'; Kienzl (yellow card) 45'; Bucur 62'	Report	Rogelj (yellow card) 40'; Behounek 71' (yellow card) 90+2'; Forst 105', 110'; Ranacher (yellow card) 119'	Stadium: Sportzentrum Neusiedl; Attendance: 384; Referee: Harald Lechner

15 July 2022	SC-ESV Parndorf 1919 (IV)	2–3	SV Licht-Loidl Lafnitz (II)	Parndorf
19:30	Wendelin 8'; Weber (yellow card) 41' (goal) 67'; Augustini (yellow card) 53'; Mikus (yellow card) 85'	Report	Nutz (yellow card) 63'; Zingl (yellow card) 66'; Gremsl 77'; Grosse 80'; Prohart (yellow card) 85'; Lichtenberger 90+2'	Stadium: Heidebodenstadion; Attendance: 300; Referee: Pascal Günsberg

15 July 2022	Union Raiffeisen Gurten (III)	3–2	SU Strasser Steine St. Martin (IV)	Gurten
19:30	Horner (yellow card) 11'; Wimmleitner (yellow card) 26' (goal) 90' (pen.); Schlosser 33'; Reiter 87'	Report	Wild 34'; Berndorfer 78'; Magauer (yellow card) 80'; Schauberger (yellow card) 90+2'	Stadium: Park21-Arena Gurten; Attendance: 400; Referee: Benedikt Ljubas

16 July 2022	SC Röfix Röthis (III)	0–6	Sturm Graz (I)	Röthis
10:30	Decet (yellow card) 40'; Scheichl (yellow card) 80'; Domig (yellow card) 92'	Report	Højlund 5', 33'; Affengruber 18'; Sarkaria 44', 62'; Kronberger 91'	Stadium: Sportplatz an der Ratz; Attendance: 1,487; Referee: Andreas Heiss

16 July 2022	FC Marchfeld Donauauen (III)	2–3	SC Austria Lustenau (I)	Mannsdorf
17:00	Ortner 12'; Entrup 60' (yellow card) 90'; Bajrami (yellow card) 64'	Report	Surdanovic 46', 54'; Schmid 65'; Schierl (yellow card) 86'; Guenouche (yellow card) 90+1'; Rhein (yellow card) 90+1'	Stadium: Aulandstadion; Attendance: 450; Referee: Gerhard Grobelnik

16 July 2022	FC Stadlau (IV)	0–4	SV Ried (I)	Vienna
17:00	Libic (red card) 12'	Report	Monschein 13', 24'; Ziegl 17'; Nutz 55'	Stadium: OMV-Sportanlage Stadlau; Attendance: 450; Referee: Alexander Harkam

16 July 2022	FC Wels (IV)	0–7	FK Austria Wien (I)	Wels
17:15		Report	Fischer 11', 25', 56', 74' (yellow card) 61'; Jukic 12', 51', 55'	Stadium: HUBER Arena; Attendance: 1,900; Referee: Markus Hameter

16 July 2022	SV ASKÖ Köttmannsdorf (IV)	1–3	Grazer AK (II)	Köttmannsdorf
17:30	Kruschitz 27' (red card) 53'; Striednig (yellow card) 50'; Sablatnig (yellow card) 65'	Report	Schriebl 44'; Rusek 59'; Gabbichler 81'	Stadium: Sportplatz ASKÖ Köttmannsdorf; Attendance: 1,100; Referee: Florian Jandl

16 July 2022	SV Domaines Kilger Frauental (IV)	0–5	USV Stein Reinisch Raiffeisen Allerheiligen (III)	Frauental
17:30		Report	Kager 1', 7'; Pistrich 44', 52'; Fauland 47'; Grillitsch (yellow card) 78'; Mihovilovic (yellow card) 88'	Stadium: Sportplatz SV Frauental; Attendance: 379; Referee: Erwin Komornyik

16 July 2022	SC Schwarz-Weiß Bregenz (III)	3–0	SV Seekirchen 1945 (III)	Bregenz
17:30	Gomes 28', 32'; Gomez (yellow card) 55'; Kralj (yellow card) 58'; Barada (yellow card) 70'; Vukasinovic 90+2'	Report		Stadium: ImmoAgentur Stadion Bregenz; Attendance: 450; Referee: Olivia Tschon

16 July 2022	TWL Elektra (III)	1–3	Rheindorf Altach (I)	Vienna
18:00	Sipka 40'; Rajic (yellow card) 67'	Report	Nuhiu 3', 19'; Amankwah 74'	Stadium: Sportplatz Rax; Attendance: 402; Referee: Josef Spurny

16 July 2022	SC Schwaz (III)	1–9	LASK (I)	Schwaz
18:00	Auer 1'; Knoflach (yellow card) 45'; Leitner (yellow card) 64'	Report	Nakamura 18'; Stojković 24'; Luckeneder (yellow card) 31'; Ljubičić 44', 54', 56'; Goiginger 65', 77'; Jovičić 79'; Schmidt 90'	Stadium: Silberstadt Arena Schwaz; Attendance: 600; Referee: Sebastian Gishamer

16 July 2022	SV Stripfing/Weiden (III)	0–1	FCM Flyeralarm Traiskirchen (III)	Stripfing
18:00	Gartner (yellow card) 59'; Ziger (yellow card) 61'; Güclü (yellow card) 73'	Report	Tercek (yellow card) 55'; Oppong 90+1'; Helleparth (yellow card) 90+2'	Stadium: Sportplatz Stripfing SV; Attendance: 300; Referee: Christopher Mayrhofer

16 July 2022	SV Sparkasse Leobendorf (III)	1–2	SKN St. Pölten (II)	Leobendorf
18:00	Viertl (yellow card) 45'; Knorad (yellow card) 64'; Düzgün (yellow card) 77'; Laschet (yellow card) 84'; Bartholomay 90+3'	Report	Ramsebner (yellow card) 42'; Llanez 73'; Monzialo (yellow card) 83'; Stolz (yellow card) 83'; Silue 90+5'	Stadium: Sportplatz Leobendorf; Attendance: 400; Referee: Daniel Stauber

16 July 2022	VfB Hohenems (III)	1–10	Blau-Weiß Linz (II)	Hohenems
19:00	Nagler 77'	Report	Schösswendter 20'; Ronivaldo 23'; Brandner 36', 46'; Seidl 43'; Mitrović 57', 73'; Fetahu 62', 81'; Mensah 73'	Stadium: Herrenriedstadion; Attendance: 350; Referee: Jakob Rigger

16 July 2022	ASV Siegendorf 1930 (III)	2–2 (a.e.t.) (4–3 p)	First Vienna (II)	Siegendorf
19:30	Lehner (yellow card) 65'; Jani 78'; Nemec (yellow card) 116'; Pester 120'	Report	Abazovic 13'; Steiner (yellow card) 90'; Tanzmayer 98'; B. Luxbacher (yellow card) 101'	Stadium: Sportplatz Siegendorf; Attendance: 700; Referee: Emil Ristoskov
	Penalties
	Secco (penalty missed); Martinov (penalty scored); Aliloski (penalty scored); Nemec (penalty scored); Tompte (penalty scored)		B. Luxbacher (penalty scored); Bacher (penalty scored); D. Luxbacher (penalty scored); Bumbić (penalty missed); Abazovic (penalty missed)

17 July 2022	Sportvereinigung ATP Metallbau Purgstall (V)	2–4	Admira Wacker (II)	Purgstall an der Erlauf
16:00	Koppensteiner (yellow card) 16'; Pitzl 52', 65' (yellow card) 79'	Report	Scharner 15' (o.g.); Ristanic 26'; Stevanovic 59', 90+1'	Stadium: Fliederstadion; Attendance: 850; Referee: Safak Barmaksiz

17 July 2022	SV Raika Kuchl (III)	1–4	Wolfsberg (I)	Kuchl
17:00	Lürzer 33'; Strobl (yellow card) 38'; Klimitsch (yellow card) 55'	Report	Kerschbaumer 11'; Baribo 15', 48'; Veratschnig 66'	Stadium: Sportplatz Kuchl; Attendance: 700; Referee: Walter Altmann

17 July 2022	SC Sparkasse Imst 1933 (III)	2–0	TSV McDonald's St. Johann (III)	Imst
17:00	Prantl 45+1', 90+4'; Raich (yellow card) 64'; Moser (yellow card) 65'; Schmiederer (yellow card) 88'	Report	Kendlbacher (yellow card) 32' (yellow-red card) 65'; Volk (yellow card) 88'	Stadium: Velly Arena Imst; Attendance: 720; Referee: Zlatko Jurcevic

17 July 2022	SV Telfs (III)	2–4	Austria Salzburg (III)	Telfs
17:00	Viertler (yellow card) 48'; Perstaller (yellow card) 70' (goal) 80'; Pellegrini 76'; Ribis (yellow card) 86'	Report	Hödl 54', 57', 71'; Theiner (yellow card) 58'; Wiedl (yellow card) 69' (yellow-red card) 90+3'; Schwaighofer 67' (yellow card) 86'	Stadium: Sportsplatz Tels Emat; Attendance: 0 Referee: Zeljko Kojadinovic

17 July 2022	WSC HOGO Hertha (III)	1–0	SK Vorwärts Steyr (II)	Wels
18:00	Stadlmann 15'; Cirkic (yellow card) 31'; Zümrüt (yellow card) 31' (yellow-red card) 32'; Mislov (yellow card) 75'; Duna (yellow card) 81'; Mayr (yellow card) 90+6'	Report	Pasić (yellow card) 31'; Zdichynec (yellow card) 34'; Dombaxi (yellow card) 90+4'	Stadium: Mauth Stadion; Attendance: 700; Referee: Philip Gadler

19 July 2022	TuS Bad Gleichenberg (III)	0–2	FAC Wien (II)	Bad Gleichenberg
18:30		Report	Krasniqi 25'; Mankowski (yellow card) 56'; Hubmann (yellow card) 73'; Adewumi 80'	Stadium: Bad Gleichenberg Arena; Attendance: 500; Referee: Samuel Sampl

19 July 2022	SV Dellach/Gail (V)	1–2	Kapfenberger SV (II)	Dellach/Gail
19:30	Santner (yellow card) 35'; Lulic (yellow card) 60'; Kaltenhofer (yellow card) 74'; Umfahrer (yellow card) 77' (goal) 86'; Nuhanovic (yellow card) 90+6'	Report	Walchhütter (red card) 17'; Heindl (yellow card) 45' (goal) 67'; Puschl 90+7' (pen.)	Stadium: Sportplatz SV Dellach/Gail; Attendance: 500; Referee: Markus Greinecker

== Second round ==
Sixteen second round matches will be played 30 August to 1 September 2022. The draw was held on Friday, July 22 by ORF domestic policy chief Hans Bürger.

Number of teams per tier still in competition
Bundesliga (I)	2. League (II)	Regionalliga (III)	Landesliga (IV)	Unterliga (V)	Total
12 / 12	10 / 12	10 / 32	0 / 6	0 / 2	32 / 64

30 August 2022	Admira Wacker (II)	3–0	Rheindorf Altach (I)	Maria Enzersdorf
18:00	Rasner 17'; Badji 22'; Ristanic 41'; Gallé (yellow card) 45+1'; Wagner (yellow card) 80'	Report		Stadium: Motion invest Arena; Attendance: 1,150; Referee: Joseph Spurney

30 August 2022	Kapfenberger SV (II)	1–2 (a.e.t.)	Floridsdorfer AC (II)	Kapfenberg
18:30	Grosse 7'; Mohamed (yellow card) 24'; Mandler (yellow card) 28'; Walchhütter (red card) 36'; Miskovic (yellow card) 70'; Szerencsi (yellow card) 98'	Report	Kröhn (yellow card) 33'; Miljanic 57' (yellow card) 116'; Bubalović (yellow card) 65'; Gitsov (yellow card) 69'; Hernaus (yellow card) 67'; Maier (yellow card) 88'; Wallquist (yellow card) 90+3'; Bertaccini 104'	Stadium: Franz Fekete Stadion; Attendance: 500; Referee: Thomas Fröhlacher

30 August 2022	SV Licht-Loidl Lafnitz (II)	1–2	Grazer AK (II)	Lafnitz
19:00	Duvnjak (yellow card) 8'; Poldrugac (yellow card) 69'; Prohart 89'; Umjenovic (yellow card) 90+1'; Gremsl (yellow card) 90+3'	Report	Spirk (yellow card) 28'; Koller 58'; Peham 76'; Rusek (yellow card) 88'	Stadium: Fußballarena Lafnitz; Attendance: 1,140; Referee: Christian-Petru Ciochirca

30 August 2022	Wiener Sport-Club (III)	2–0	SC Austria Lustenau (I)	Vienna
19:00	Andrejevic 9', 10'; Buzuk (yellow card) 30'; Dimon (yellow card) 45+2'; Prögelhof (yellow card) 53'; Haas (yellow card) 65'	Report	Grabher (yellow card) 75'	Stadium: Sportklub Stadium; Attendance: 1,852; Referee: Jacob Semler

30 August 2022	SV Horn (II)	3–1	SKN St. Pölten (II)	Horn
19:30	Tomka 30'; Mulahaililovic 36', 96'; Gashi (yellow card) 40'; Hausjell (yellow card) 87'; Pronichev (yellow card) 90+1'	Report	Silue (yellow card) 33'; Llanez 50' (yellow card) 51' (yellow-red card) 90+2'; Morou (yellow card) 59'; Conté (yellow card) 67'; Montnor (yellow card) 80'	Stadium: Sparkasse Horn Arena; Attendance: 970; Referee: Markus Hameter

30 August 2022	Union Raiffeisen Gurten (III)	0–3	Red Bull Salzburg (I)	Ried im Innkreis
20:30	Horner (yellow card) 40'; Schnaitter (yellow card) 44'	Report	Hauser (yellow card) 37'; Schütz 45+1' (o.g.); Diarra (yellow card) 51'; Kameri 64'; Dedić (yellow card) 68'; Adamu 83'; Gourna-Douath (yellow card) 87'	Stadium: josko ARENA; Attendance: 3,900; Referee: Oliver Fluch

31 August 2022	Sturm Graz (I)	3–1	SV Austria Salzburg (III)	Graz
18:00	Sarkaria 11', 79' (pen.); Hausberger 29' (o.g.)	Report	Krainz (yellow card) 5'; Theiner (yellow card) 14'; Sorda 72'	Stadium: Merkur Arena; Attendance: 7,118; Referee: Harald Lechner

31 August 2022	SC Sparkasse Imst 1933 (III)	1–4 (a.e.t.)	LASK (I)	Imst
18:00	Mittermair (yellow card) 35'; Zimmersschied (yellow card) 58'; Lamp (yellow card) 69'; Hamzic 72'; Waibl (yellow card) 81'; Jovljevic (yellow card) 90+3'; Ramsbacher (yellow card) 96'	Report	Celic (yellow card) 38'; Ziereis (red card) 62'; Nakamura 85', 104'; Flecker 93'; Ljubičić 118'	Stadium: Velly Arena; Attendance: 2,500; Referee: Emil Ristoskov

31 August 2022	Deutschlandsberger SC “Wonisch Installations” (III)	1–5	Wolfsberg (I)	Deutschlandsberg
18:30	Pistrich (yellow card) 6'; Grubelnik (yellow card) 71'; Fuchs 84'	Report	Baribo 7' (pen.) (yellow card) 68'; Vizinger 12' (pen.), 51'; Ballo 77'; Varatschnig 86'	Stadium: Koralmstadion; Attendance: 750; Referee: Gergard Grobelnik

31 August 2022	FC Mohren Dornbirn 1913 (II)	3–2	TSV Egger Glas Hartberg (I)	Dornbirn
19:00	Nepomuceno 32'; Stefanon 42'; Parger (yellow card) 57'; Mätzler (yellow card) 72'; Ibrisimovic 87'	Report	Gollner (yellow card) 6'; Almog (yellow card) 30' (goal) 45+2'; Horvat (yellow card) 58'; Steinwender 90+2'	Stadium: Stadion Birkenwiese; Attendance: 850; Referee: Walter Altmann

31 August 2022	SKU Ertl Glas Amstetten (II)	0–3	FC Blau-Weiß Linz (II)	Amstetten
19:00	Ammerer (yellow card) 18'; Offenthaler (yellow card) 38'; Deinhofer (yellow card) 54'	Report	Mayulu 2'; Brandner (yellow card) 5'; M. Seidl 43'; Maranda 54'	Stadium: Ertl Glas-Stadion; Attendance: 1,130; Referee: Christopher Jäger

31 August 2022	SC Schwarz-Weiß Bregenz (III)	0–5	SK Austria Klagenfurt (I)	Bregenz
19:00	Doriano (yellow card) 55'; Barada (yellow card) 62'	Report	Cvetko 2'; Rieder 30'; Irving 32'; Thorsten (yellow card) 54'; Karweina 58'; Arweiler 90' (pen.)	Stadium: ImmoAgentur Stadion; Attendance: 500; Referee: Arnes Talic

31 August 2022	FCM Flyeralarm Traiskirchen (III)	0–5	WSG Tirol (I)	Traiskirchen
19:00	Ajradini (yellow card) 28'; Haas (yellow card) 35'; Koreimann (yellow card) 74'	Report	Rinaldi 20', 33'; Tomic (yellow card) 31' (goal) 79'; Schulz 44'; Forst 66'	Stadium: Sportsplatz Traiskirchen; Attendance: 500; Referee: Stefan Ebner

31 August 2022	WSC HOGO Hertha (III)	2–4	SV Ried (I)	Wels
19:30	Ried 26'; Kukic (yellow card) 35'; Luna 41'; Huber (yellow card) 48'; Hodzic (yellow card) 49'; Sulimani (yellow card) 70' (yellow-red card) 70'; Awuni (yellow card) 70'; Ried (red card) 73'; Norenkov (yellow card) 80'; Cirkic (yellow card) 90+2'; Norenkov (red card) postgame'	Report	Cosgun (yellow card) 29'; Wießmeier 43' (yellow card) 90+2'; Monschein 55'; Weberbauer 77'; Mikić 90+3'	Stadium: Mauth Stadion; Attendance: 1,000; Referee: Manuel Schuttengruber

31 August 2022	ASV Siegendorf 1930 (III)	0–5	FK Austria Wien (I)	Vienna
20:30		Report	Gruber 6', 28'; Tabakovic 30'; Fitz 39'; Jukic 78'	Stadium: Hohe Warte Stadium; Attendance: 2,107; Referee: Alexander Harkam

1 September 2022	USV Stein Reinisch Raiffeisen Allerheiligen (III)	0–2	SK Rapid Wien (I)	Allerheiligen bei Wildon
17:30	Grillitsch (yellow card) 46'	Report	Druijf 66'; Wimmer 79'	Stadium: Sportplatz Allerheiligen; Attendance: 1,250; Referee: Alan Kijas

== Third round ==
Eight third round matches will be played 17 October 2022. The draw was held on Sunday, 4 August 2022. As part of the ORF program "Sport am Sonntag", the draw was conducted by Austrian bobsleigh pilot Katrin Beierl.

Number of teams per tier still in competition
Bundesliga (I)	2. League (II)	Regionalliga (III)	Total
9 / 12	6 / 12	1 / 32	16 / 64

18 October 2022	WSG Tirol (I)	1–4	Rapid Wien (I)	Innsbruck
11:00	Sabitzer 36' (Bacher); Behounek (yellow card) 80'	Report	Grüll 6' (Knasmüllner); Pejić (yellow card) 23'; Hofmann (yellow card) 34'; Greil (yellow card) 58'; Druijf (yellow card) 71' (goal) 76' (Burgstaller); Kerschbaum 74' (Burgstaller); Zimmermann 84' (Greil)	Stadium: Gernot Langes Stadion; Attendance: 5,000; Referee: Sebastian Gishamer

18 October 2022	FC Mohren Dornbirn 1913 (II)	1–2	Austria Klagenfurt (I)	Dornbirn
12:00	Nepomuceno 39'	Report	Wimmer 18'; Cvetko 82'	Stadium: Stadion Birkenwiese; Attendance: 1,000; Referee: Walter Altmann

18 October 2022	SV Horn (II)	2–3	SV Ried (I)	Horn
19:30	Yilmaz 16'; Mijić 18'	Report	Chabbi 53'; Nutz 68'; Kragl 90+1'	Stadium: Sparkasse Horn Arena; Attendance: 1,350; Referee: Christopher Jäger

18 October 2022	Floridsdorfer AC (II)	1–2	LASK (I)	Floridsdorf
20:15	Monsberger 40'	Report	Renner 23'; Goiginger 89'	Stadium: FAC-Platz; Attendance: 2,074; Referee: Markus Hameter

19 October 2022	Blau-Weiß Linz (II)	1–3	Wolfsberg (I)	Linz
11:00	Ronivaldo (yellow card) 68' (goal) 84' (Mensah); Koch (yellow card) 85'	Report	Schifferl 34' (Omić); Baribo 47' (Anzolin); Malone 48' (Baribo)	Stadium: Hofmann-Personal Stadion; Attendance: 900; Referee: Julian Weinberger

19 October 2022	Grazer AK (II)	0–1	Sturm Graz (I)	Graz
18:00	Rosenberger (yellow card) 38'; Schriebl (yellow card) 43'; Perchtold (yellow card) 71'	Report	Ajeti 65' (Ljubic) (yellow card) 68'; Ingolitsch (yellow card) 80'	Stadium: Merkur Arena; Attendance: 15,400; Referee: Alexander Harkam

19 October 2022	Admira Wacker (II)	1–6	Red Bull Salzburg (I)	Maria Enzersdorf
20:30	Zwierschitz 50'; Gallé (yellow card) 56'	Report	Wöber 2'; Pavlović 25' (Kjaergaard); Šeško 32'; Adamu 41' (Diarra); Dedić 65' (Adamu); Šimić 75' (pen.)	Stadium: Motion invest Arena; Attendance: 1,650; Referee: Christian-Petru Ciochirca

20 October 2022	Wiener Sport-Club (III)	3–1	Austria Wien (I)	Vienna
20:30	Vučenović 22' (Pajaczkowski); Haas (yellow card) 53'; Rajkovic 61' (Pajaczkowski); Andrejević (yellow card) 65'; Beljan 86' (Rajkovic)	Report	Fitz 26' (pen.); Polster (yellow card) 33'; Fischer (yellow card) 63'; Galvão (yellow card) 65'	Stadium: Sportklub Stadium; Attendance: 6,000; Referee: Harald Lechner

== Quarter-finals ==
Four Quarter-final matches will be played from February 3 to 5, 2023. The draw was held on Sunday, 23 October 2022. As part of the ORF program "Sport am Sonntag" and was conducted by Judo Olympic and World Championships bronze medalist Shamil Borchashvili.

Number of teams per tier still in competition
Bundesliga (I)	Regionalliga (III)	Total
7 / 12	1 / 32	8 / 64

3 February 2023	Wolfsberg (I)	1–3 (a.e.t.)	Rapid Wien (I)	Wolfsberg
18:00 CET	Veratschnig (yellow card) 22'; Taferner (yellow card) 45+1'; Baribo 64' (Malone); Jochum (yellow card) 83'; Malone (yellow card) 85'; Jasic (yellow card) 95'; Omić (yellow card) 105+1'	Report	Sollbauer 83' (Auer); Bajic 106' (Strunz), 108'	Stadium: Lavanttal-Arena; Attendance: 3,021; Referee: Stefan Ebner

3 February 2023	Red Bull Salzburg (I)	1–1 (a.e.t.) (4–5 p)	Sturm Graz (I)	Salzburg
20:45 CET	Solet (yellow card) 30'; Capaldo (yellow card) 62'; Dedić (yellow card) 74' (goal) 77' (Okafor)	Report	Gazibegović 37' (Horvat); Stanković (yellow card) 90+4'	Stadium: Red Bull Arena; Attendance: 9,236; Referee: Julian Weinberger
	Penalties
	Okafor (penalty scored); Adamu (penalty scored); Šeško (penalty scored); Kjærgaard (penalty missed); Solet (penalty scored); Capaldo (penalty missed)		(penalty missed) Sarkaria; (penalty scored) Ljubic; (penalty scored) Schnegg; (penalty scored) Teixeira; (penalty scored) Dante; (penalty scored) Wüthrich

4 February 2023	Wiener Sport-Club (III)	0–2	SV Ried (I)	Vienna
18:00 CET	Haas (yellow card) 10'; Gusić (yellow card) 24' (yellow-red card) 52'; Dimov (yellow card) 48'; Pfaffl (yellow card) 55'; Andrejević (yellow card) 78'; Buzuk (yellow card) 90'	Report	Lang 51' (pen.); Cosgun (yellow card) 70'; Mikić 79' (Ungar)	Stadium: Sportklub Stadium; Attendance: 5,600; Referee: Walter Altmann

5 February 2023	LASK (I)	1–0	SK Austria Klagenfurt (I)	Pasching
18:00 CET	Žulj 50' (Stojković); Usor (yellow card) 88'	Report	Wimmer (red card) 59'	Stadium: Raiffeisen Arena; Attendance: 4,200; Referee: Christian-Petru Ciochirca

== Semi-finals ==
Two Semi-Final matches will be played between April 5–6, 2023. The draw was held as part of the ORF program "Sport am Sonntag" and was drawn by Austrian ski racer Nina Ortlieb

Number of teams per tier still in competition
Bundesliga (I)	Total
4 / 12	4 / 64

5 April 2023	Rapid Wien (I)	2–1	SV Ried (I)	Vienna
20:30 CET	Burgstaller 45+2' (Grüll), 83' (Greil); Pejić (yellow card) 58'; Querfeld (yellow card) 90'; Sollbauer (yellow card) 90+2'	Report	Lackner (yellow card) 26'; Kronberger (yellow card) 79'; Ziegl 90+3' (pen.)	Stadium: Allianz Stadion; Attendance: 21,600; Referee: Alexander Harkam

6 April 2023	Sturm Graz (I)	1–0	LASK (I)	Graz
20:30 CET	Horvat 68' (Schnegg); Schnegg (yellow card) 71'; Kiteishvili (yellow card) 85'; Emegha (yellow card) 87'; Stanković (yellow card) 90+2'	Report	Stojković (yellow card) 15'; Luckeneder (yellow card) 51'; Žulj (yellow card) 74'; Ziereis (yellow card) 87'; Ljubičić (yellow card) 88'	Stadium: Merkur Arena; Attendance: 15,600; Referee: Walter Altmann

== Final ==
30 April 2023
12:30 CET

Rapid Wien	0–2	Sturm Graz
Auer (yellow card) 44'; Wimmer (yellow card) 73'; Pejić (yellow card) 77'	Report	Schnegg (yellow card) 35'; Sarkaria 65'; Prass (yellow card) 73'; Emegha 84'

Wörthersee Stadion, Klagenfurt
Attendance: 30,000
Referee: Christopher Jäger

== Top goalscorers ==
Rank	Player	Club	Goals
1	(Austria) Manprit Sarkaria	Sturm Graz	6
2	(Israel) Tai Baribo	Wolfsberg	5
2	(Brazil) Renan	FC Mohren Dornbirn	5
4	(Austria) Manfred Fischer	Austria Wien	4
4	(Croatia) Marin Ljubičić	LASK	4
4	(Austria) Christopher Cvetko	Austria Klagenfurt	4
4	(Austria) Aleksandar Jukic	Austria Wien	4
8	7 players		3

== See also ==
- 2022–23 Austrian Football Bundesliga
- 2022–23 Austrian Football Second League
