= 2022–23 Grazer AK season =

Grazer AK
2022–23 season
- Manager: Gernot Messner
- Stadium: Merkur-Arena
- Austrian Football Second League: 2nd
- Austrian Cup: Third round
- Top goalscorer: League: Michael Liendl; Markus Rusek (7 each); All: Markus Rusek (8)

The 2022–23 season was the 121st in the history of Grazer AK and their fourth consecutive season in the top flight. The club participated in the Austrian Football Second League and the Austrian Cup.

Grazer AK lost to their eternal rivals Sturm Graz to exit the 2022–23 Austrian Cup in the round of 16, which happened to be the first derby meeting in 15 years.

== Players ==
=== First team squad ===
As of 15 July 2022

Note: Flags indicate national team as defined under FIFA eligibility rules; some limited exceptions apply. Players may hold more than one non-FIFA nationality.

No.	Pos.	Nation	Player
1	GK	AUT	Jakob Meierhofer
2	DF	AUT	Philipp Seidl
3	DF	AUT	Michael Huber
5	DF	AUT	Elias Jandrisevits
6	MF	AUT	Markus Rusek
7	MF	JPN	Atsushi Zaizen
8	MF	GER	Maximilian Somnitz
9	FW	AUT	David Peham
10	MF	AUT	Michael Liendl
11	MF	GEO	Levan Eloshvili
13	MF	AUT	Marco Perchtold (captain)

No.	Pos.	Nation	Player
15	DF	AUT	Lukas Graf
19	DF	AUT	Marco Gantschnig
20	MF	AUT	Thorsten Schriebl
21	MF	AUT	Michael Lang
22	MF	AUT	Lukas Gabbichler
23	MF	AUT	Paolo Jager
24	DF	AUT	Felix Köchl
26	GK	AUT	Christoph Nicht
27	DF	AUT	Benjamin Rosenberger
30	DF	AUT	Paul Koller
33	GK	AUT	Josef Gruber
47	FW	AUT	Daniel Kalajdzic

=== Out on loan ===
Note: Flags indicate national team as defined under FIFA eligibility rules; some limited exceptions apply. Players may hold more than one non-FIFA nationality.

No.	Pos.	Nation	Player
—	MF	AUT	Lukas Alterdinger (at Grödig)

No.	Pos.	Nation	Player
—	FW	CRO	Filip Smoljan (at SC Kalsdorf)
—	FW	AUT	Paul Kiedl (at SC Kalsdorf)

== Pre-season and friendlies ==
Win Draw Loss

1 July 2022 Friendly	SC Kalsdorf (Austria)	1–1	(Austria) Grazer AK	Kalsdorf bei Graz, Austria
18:45 CEST (UTC+2)				Stadium: Sportzentrum Kalsdorf

2 July 2022 Friendly	Grazer AK (Austria)	1–4	(Slovenia) Domžale	Ligist, Austria
16:00 CEST (UTC+2)				Stadium: Ligist Sportplatz

6 July 2022 Friendly	Grazer AK (Austria)	2–1	(Austria) Wolfsberger AC	Lebring, Austria
18:30 CEST (UTC+2)				Stadium: sanSirro Stadion Lebring

9 July 2022 Friendly	Leoben (Austria)	3–1	(Austria) Grazer AK	Leoben, Austria
19:00 CEST (UTC+2)				Stadium: Stadion Donawitz

19 November 2022 Wörthersee Cup	Austria Klagenfurt	2–1	(Austria) Grazer AK	Klagenfurt, Austria
14:00 CET (UTC+1)				Stadium: Wörthersee Stadion

20 November 2022 Wörthersee Cup	Hertha BSC (Germany)	1–1 (4–3 p)	(Austria) Grazer AK	Klagenfurt, Austria
14:00 CET (UTC+1)				Stadium: Wörthersee Stadion

25 November 2022 Friendly	Grazer AK (Austria)	5–1	(Austria) Wolfsberger AC II	Austria
CET (UTC+1)

14 January 2023 Friendly	FC Gleisdorf 09 (Austria)	2–2	(Austria) Grazer AK	Austria
CET (UTC+1)

21 January 2023 Friendly	Fürstenfeld (Austria)	0–5	(Austria) Grazer AK	Fürstenfeld, Austria
CET (UTC+1)				Stadium: JUFA Fürstenfeld Kunstrasen

28 January 2023 Friendly	Deutschlandsberger SC (Austria)	1–5	(Austria) Grazer AK	Deutschlandsberg, Austria
15:00 CET (UTC+1)				Stadium: Koralmstadion

4 February 2023 Friendly	Red Bull Salzburg (Austria)	3–4	(Austria) Grazer AK	Salzburg, Austria
11:30 CET (UTC+1)				Stadium: Red Bull Trainingszentrum

11 February 2023 Friendly	Grazer AK (Austria)	2–2	(Bosnia and Herzegovina) Čelik	Graz, Austria
15:00 CET (UTC+1)				Stadium: Sportzentrum Graz-Weinzödl

17 February 2023 Friendly	Grazer AK (Austria)	1–1	(Austria) Kapfenberger SV
17:00 CET (UTC+1)

24 March 2023 Friendly	Grazer AK (Austria)	2–2	Austria Klagenfurt
15:00 CET (UTC+1)

== Competitions ==
=== Overall record ===
Competition	First match	Last match	Starting round	Final position	Record							
Competition	First match	Last match	Starting round	Final position	Pld	W	D	L	GF	GA	GD	Win %
Austrian Football Second League	23 July 2022	4 June 2023	Matchday 1	2nd	30	17	9	4	52	29	+23	56.67
Austrian Cup	16 July 2022	19 October 2022	First round	Third round	3	2	0	1	5	3	+2	66.67
Total					33	19	9	5	57	32	+25	57.58

Source: Soccerway

=== Austrian Football Second League ===
==== League table ====
Pos	Team	Pld	W	D	L	GF	GA	GD	Pts	Promotion or relegation
1	Blau-Weiß Linz (C, P)	30	19	4	7	63	27	+36	61	Promotion to 2023–24 Austrian Football Bundesliga
2	Grazer AK	30	17	9	4	52	29	+23	60	
3	SKN St. Pölten	30	17	5	8	53	27	+26	56	
4	SV Horn	30	13	9	8	38	33	+5	48	
5	SKU Amstetten	30	12	9	9	49	49	0	45	

Updated to match(es) played on 4 June 2023. Source: 2.Liga Table
Rules for classification: 1) Points; 2) Direct Duel; 3) Goal difference; 4) Goals scored; 5) Matches won; 6) Away matches won; 7) Away goals scored
(C) Champions; (P) Promoted

==== Results summary ====
Overall								Home						Away					
Pld	W	D	L	GF	GA	GD	Pts	W	D	L	GF	GA	GD	W	D	L	GF	GA	GD
30	17	9	4	52	29	+23	60	11	3	1	25	8	+17	6	6	3	27	21	+6

Source: ADMIRAL 2. Liga

==== Results by round ====
Round	1	2	3	4	5	6	7	8
Ground	H	A	H	A	A	H	A	H
Result	D	L	W	D	D	W	W	W
Position								

Source: ADMIRAL 2. Liga
A = Away; H = Home; W = Win; D = Draw; L = Loss

==== Matches ====
The league fixtures were announced on 24 June 2022.

23 July 2022 1	Grazer AK	0–0	Floridsdorfer AC	Graz
CEST (UTC+2)				Stadium: Liebenauer Stadium

29 July 2022 2	Admira Wacker Mödling	4–3	Grazer AK
CEST (UTC+2)

6 August 2022 3	Grazer AK	1–0	Liefering	Graz
CEST (UTC+2)				Stadium: Liebenauer Stadium

12 August 2022 4	Blau-Weiß Linz	1–1	Grazer AK	Linz
CEST (UTC+2)

21 August 2022 5	Vorwärts Steyr	1–1	Grazer AK
CEST (UTC+2)

27 August 2022 6	Grazer AK	3–1	Lafnitz	Graz
CEST (UTC+2)				Stadium: Liebenauer Stadium

4 September 2022 7	Kapfenberger SV	1–5	Grazer AK
CEST (UTC+2)

10 September 2022 8	Grazer AK	2–0	Horn	Graz
CEST (UTC+2)				Stadium: Liebenauer Stadium

1 October 2023 10	Grazer AK	1–1	Sturm Graz II	Graz
CEST (UTC+2)				Stadium: Liebenauer Stadium

23 October 2023 13	Grazer AK	1–0	First Vienna	Graz
CEST (UTC+2)				Stadium: Liebenauer Stadium

5 November 2023 15	Grazer AK	2–0	Dornbirn	Graz
CET (UTC+1)				Stadium: Liebenauer Stadium

12 November 2023 16	Grazer AK	3–1	Kapfenberger SV	Graz
CET (UTC+1)				Stadium: Liebenauer Stadium

5 March 2023 18	Grazer AK	1–0	Admira Wacker Mödling	Graz
CET (UTC+1)				Stadium: Liebenauer Stadium

18 March 2023 20	Grazer AK	3–0	Austria Wien II	Graz
CET (UTC+1)				Stadium: Liebenauer Stadium

8 April 2023 22	Grazer AK	3–2	Vorwärts Steyr	Graz
CEST (UTC+2)				Stadium: Liebenauer Stadium

14 April 2023 23	Grazer AK	0–0	St. Pölten	Graz
CEST (UTC+2)				Stadium: Liebenauer Stadium

28 April 2023 25	Grazer AK	0–3	Blau-Weiß Linz	Graz
CEST (UTC+2)				Stadium: Liebenauer Stadium

20 May 2023 28	Grazer AK	2–0	Rapid Wien II	Graz
CEST (UTC+2)				Stadium: Liebenauer Stadium

6 May 2023 29	Grazer AK	3–0	Amstetten	Graz
CEST (UTC+2)	Jastremski 53'; Liendl 75' (pen.); Peham 90+2'			Stadium: Liebenauer Stadium

=== Austrian Cup ===
16 July 2022 First round	Köttmannsdorf	1–3	Grazer AK	Köttmannsdorf
17:30 CEST (UTC+2)	Kruschitz 27'		Schriebl 44'; Rusek 59'; Gabbichler 82'	Stadium: Sportplatz ASKÖ Köttmannsdorf

30 July 2022 Second round	Lafnitz	1–2	Grazer AK	Lafnitz
19:00 CEST (UTC+2)	Prohart 89'		Koller 48'; Peham 76'	Stadium: Sportplatz Lafnitz

19 October 2022 Third round	Grazer AK	0–1	Sturm Graz	Graz
18:00 CEST (UTC+2)			Ajeti 65'	Stadium: Merkur-Arena; Referee: Alexander Harkam
