= Bohdan Vyunnyk =

Ukrainian footballer

Personal information
- Full name: Bohdan Serhiyovych Vyunnyk
- Date of birth: 21 May 2002 (age 24)
- Place of birth: Kharkiv, Ukraine
- Height: 1.89 m (6 ft 2 in)
- Position: Forward

Team information
- Current team: Legia Warsaw (on loan from Lechia Gdańsk)
- Number: 27

Youth career
- 2013–2016: Metalist Kharkiv
- 2016–2017: Dynamo Kyiv
- 2017–2020: Shakhtar Donetsk

Senior career*
| Years | Team | Apps | (Gls) |
| 2020–2024 | Shakhtar Donetsk | 11 | (1) |
| 2021–2022 | → Mariupol (loan) | 11 | (1) |
| 2022–2023 | → Zürich (loan) | 7 | (0) |
| 2023 | → Grazer AK (loan) | 14 | (1) |
| 2024– | Lechia Gdańsk | 57 | (10) |
| 2026– | → Legia Warsaw (loan) | 3 | (1) |

International career
| 2017 | Ukraine U15 | 2 | (0) |
| 2018–2019 | Ukraine U17 | 6 | (1) |
| 2021–2025 | Ukraine U21 | 36 | (8) |
- * Club domestic league appearances and goals as of 01:00, 26 October 2026 (UTC)

Bohdan Vyunnyk (Ukrainian: Богдан Сергійович В'юнник; born 21 May 2002) is a Ukrainian professional footballer who plays as a forward for Ekstraklasa club Legia Warsaw, on loan from Lechia Gdańsk.

== Career ==
Vyunnyk is a product of the different youth sportive schools, who in 2017 joined the FC Shakhtar Donetsk Academy in the Ukrainian Premier League in 2020.

He played in the Ukrainian Premier League Reserves and made his debut for Shakhtar Donetsk in the 2020–21 UEFA Champions League in a winning away match against Real Madrid on 21 October 2020.

After the 2022 Russian invasion of Ukraine, he fled to Switzerland. There he trained with FC Zürich. Until the summer of 2022 he played for FC Zürich U21, then he was loaned out from Shakhtar Donetsk for one season and included in the first-team squad.

In January 2023, he moved on loan to Grazer AK.

On 6 March 2024, Vyunnyk joined Polish I liga club Lechia Gdańsk on a four-and-a-half-year contract.

On 4 September 2026, Vyunnyk moved to Ekstraklasa side Legia Warsaw on a one-year loan, with an option to make the move permanent.

== Career statistics ==
As of match played 4 May 2026

Appearances and goals by club, season and competition
| Club | Season | League | | | National cup (Note: Includes Ukrainian Cup, Swiss Cup, Polish Cup) | | Europe | | Other | | Total | |
| Club | Season | Division | Apps | Goals | Apps | Goals | Apps | Goals | Apps | Goals | Apps | Goals |
|---|---|---|---|---|---|---|---|---|---|---|---|---|
| Shakhtar Donetsk | 2020–21 | Ukrainian Premier League | 5 | 0 | 2 | 0 | 1 (Note: Appearance(s) in UEFA Champions League) | 0 | 0 | 0 | 8 | 0 |
| Shakhtar Donetsk | 2023–24 | Ukrainian Premier League | 6 | 1 | 0 | 0 | 0 | 0 | 0 | 0 | 6 | 1 |
| Shakhtar Donetsk | Total | | 11 | 1 | 2 | 0 | 1 | 0 | 0 | 0 | 14 | 1 |
| Mariupol (loan) | 2021–22 | Ukrainian Premier League | 11 | 1 | 2 | 0 | — | | — | | 13 | 1 |
| FC Zürich (loan) | 2022–23 | Swiss Super League | 7 | 0 | 1 | 0 | 6 (Note: Appearances in UEFA Europa League) | 0 | — | | 14 | 0 |
| Grazer AK (loan) | 2022–23 | 2. Liga | 14 | 1 | — | | — | | — | | 14 | 1 |
| Lechia Gdańsk | 2024–25 | Ekstraklasa | 32 | 7 | 1 | 0 | — | | — | | 33 | 7 |
| Lechia Gdańsk | 2025–26 | Ekstraklasa | 25 | 3 | 3 | 0 | — | | — | | 28 | 3 |
| Lechia Gdańsk | 2026–27 | I liga | 0 | 0 | 0 | 0 | — | | — | | 0 | 0 |
| Lechia Gdańsk | Total | | 57 | 10 | 4 | 0 | — | | — | | 61 | 10 |
| Legia Warsaw (loan) | 2026–27 | Ekstraklasa | 0 | 0 | — | | — | | — | | 0 | 0 |
| Career total | | | 100 | 13 | 9 | 0 | 7 | 0 | 0 | 0 | 116 | 13 |

| Photos, videos from official social networks | https://www.instagram.com/viunnyk_official/ |
