= 2021–22 WSG Tirol season =

WSG Tirol
2021–22 season
- Chairman: Diana Langes-Swarovski
- Manager: Thomas Silberberger
- Stadium: Tivoli-Neu
- Austrian Football Bundesliga: 7th
- Austrian Cup: Second round
Home colours	Away colours

The 2021–22 season was WSG Tirol's 91st season in the club's existence and the club's tenth consecutive season in the top flight of Austrian football. In addition to the domestic league, WSG Tirol participated in the Austrian Cup.

== Players ==
=== First-team squad ===
Note: Flags indicate national team as defined under FIFA eligibility rules; some limited exceptions apply. Players may hold more than one non-FIFA nationality.

No.	Pos.	Nation	Player
1	GK	AUT	Paul Schermer
13	GK	AUT	Benjamin Ožegović
25	GK	GER	Ferdinand Oswald
35	GK	ITA	Simon Beccari
5	DF	AUT	Felix Bacher
15	DF	GER	Maxime Awoudja
3	DF	RUS	Leon Klassen
22	DF	AUT	Mario Andric
24	DF	AUT	Fabian Koch
30	DF	AUT	Raffael Behounek
26	DF	AUT	Dominik Štumberger
44	DF	GER	Kofi Schulz
4	MF	AUT	Valentino Müller
6	MF	GRE	Thanos Petsos
8	MF	ENG	Renny Smith
10	MF	DEN	Bror Blume
14	MF	AUT	Alexander Ranacher
17	MF	AUT	Johannes Naschberger
21	MF	SLO	Žan Rogelj
23	MF	AUT	Stefan Skrbo
98	MF	SLO	Sandi Ogrinec
77	MF	AUT	Julius Ertlthaler
7	FW	AUT	Thomas Sabitzer
9	FW	ALB	Giacomo Vrioni
11	FW	AUT	Felix Kerber
18	FW	AUT	Denis Tomic
19	FW	AUT	Justin Forst
20	FW	AUT	Tobias Anselm
27	FW	AUT	Markus Wallner
33	FW	SWE	Tim Prica

== Transfers ==
Summer 2021

In

Giacomo Vrioni – loan from Juventus

Thomas Sabitzer – from LASK

Bror Blume – from Aarhus GF

Maxime Awoudja – from Türkgücü München

Felix Bacher – from SC Freiburg II

Leon Klassen – from TSV 1860 München

Valentino Müller – from LASK

Tim Prica – from Aalborg BK

Julius Ertlthaler – from TSV Hartberg

Sandi Ogrinec – free transfer

Out

Nikolai Baden Frederiksen – returned to Juventus II

David Schnegg – to Venezia FC

Florian Rieder – to SK Austria Klagenfurt

David Gugganig – to Wolfsberger AC

Thanos Petsos – to Riga FC

== Pre-season and Friendly matches ==
Win Draw Loss Fixtures

Win

26 June 2021

WSG Tyrol- 3

SV Wörgl - 0

Draw

2 July 2021

WSG Tyrol- 1

FC Vaduz - 1

Loss

7 July 2021

WSG Tyrol- 1

FC Liefering - 2

Loss

10 July 2021

WSG Tyrol - 1

VfB Stuttgart - 3

Win (Cup)

16 July 2021

WSG Tyrol- 3

SV Leobendorf - 0

Overall: 2 Wins 2 Loss 1 Draw

== Competitions ==
=== Overall record ===
Competition	First match	Last match	Starting round	Record							
Competition	First match	Last match	Starting round	Pld	W	D	L	GF	GA	GD	Win %
Austrian Football Bundesliga	25 July 2021	May 2022	Matchday 1	4	0	4	0	5	5	+0	0.00
Austrian Cup	16 July 2021		First round	1	1	0	0	3	0	+3	100.00
Total				5	1	4	0	8	5	+3	20.00

Last updated: 14 August 2021
Source: Soccerway

=== Austrian Football Bundesliga ===
==== League table ====
Austrian Bundesliga regular season table
Pos	Team	Pld	W	D	L	GF	GA	GD	Pts	Qualification
7	Ried	22	7	8	7	31	41	−10	29	Qualification for the Relegation round
8	LASK	22	6	7	9	28	29	−1	25	Qualification for the Relegation round
9	WSG Tirol	22	5	8	9	30	42	−12	23	Qualification for the Relegation round
10	Hartberg	22	5	7	10	29	35	−6	22	Qualification for the Relegation round
11	Admira Wacker Mödling	22	4	8	10	25	31	−6	20	Qualification for the Relegation round

Source: Austrian Football Bundesliga
Rules for classification: 1) Points; 2) Head-to-head record; 3) Goal difference; 4) Goals scored; 5) Matches won; 6) Away matches won; 7) Away goals scored.

Pos	Team	Pld	W	D	L	GF	GA	GD	Pts	Qualification	RBS	STU	AWI	WOL	RWI	KLA
1	Red Bull Salzburg (C)	32	25	5	2	77	19	+58	52	Qualification for the Champions League group stage	—	1–0	5–0	4–0	2–1	1–1
2	Sturm Graz	32	16	8	8	62	46	+16	37	Qualification for the Champions League third qualifying round	2–1	—	1–0	1–4	2–1	3–1
3	Austria Wien	32	11	13	8	44	39	+5	29	Qualification for the Europa League play-off round	1–2	4–2	—	2–1	1–1	1–1
4	Wolfsberger AC	32	14	5	13	48	53	−5	28	Qualification for the Europa Conference League third qualifying round	1–4	0–2	1–1	—	2–1	1–2
5	Rapid Wien (O)	32	10	11	11	48	45	+3	25	Qualification for the Europa Conference League play-offs	0–1	1–1	1–1	2–1	—	2–2
6	Austria Klagenfurt	32	8	12	12	43	57	−14	21		0–6	1–2	1–2	2–3	1–3	—

Legend: Blue = home team win; Yellow = draw; Red = away team win.
Rules for classification: 1) Points; 2) Points with (possible) half points subtracted due to rounding; 3) Head-to-head points; 4) Head-to-head goal difference; 5) Head-to-head goals scored; 6) Head-to-head away goals scored; 7) Goal difference; 8) Goals scored; 9) Matches won; 10) Away matches won; 11) Away goals scored.
(C) Champions; (O) Play-off winners

Austrian Bundesliga relegation round table
Pos	Team	Pld	W	D	L	GF	GA	GD	Pts	Qualification	WAT	LIN	ALT	RIE	HAR	ADM
1	WSG Tirol	32	10	10	12	46	58	−12	28	Qualification for the Europa Conference League play-offs	—	4–0	0–3	2–0	4–2	0–0
2	LASK	32	9	12	11	44	42	+2	26	Qualification for the Europa Conference League play-offs	6–0	—	2–1	0–2	3–3	3–1
3	Rheindorf Altach	32	7	8	17	24	49	−25	22		2–1	0–0	—	1–1	0–0	2–2
4	Ried	32	8	13	11	40	54	−14	22		2–3	1–1	1–2	—	0–0	1–1
5	Hartberg	32	7	12	13	43	47	−4	22		0–1	0–0	4–0	1–1	—	1–2
6	Admira Wacker Mödling (R)	32	6	13	13	36	46	−10	21	Relegation to Austrian Football Second League	1–1	1–1	0–3	2–0	1–3	—

Source: Austrian Bundesliga
Legend: Blue = home team win; Yellow = draw; Red = away team win.
Rules for classification: 1) Points; 2) Points with (possible) half points subtracted due to rounding; 3) Head-to-head points; 4) Head-to-head goal difference; 5) Head-to-head goals scored; 6) Head-to-head away goals scored; 7) Goal difference; 8) Goals scored; 9) Matches won; 10) Away matches won; 11) Away goals scored.
(R) Relegated

==== Results summary ====
Overall								Home						Away					
Pld	W	D	L	GF	GA	GD	Pts	W	D	L	GF	GA	GD	W	D	L	GF	GA	GD
4	0	2	2	4	10	−6	2	0	1	1	3	6	−3	0	1	1	1	4	−3

Last updated: 14 August 2021.
Source: Austrian Football Bundesliga

==== Results by round ====
Round	1	2	3	4
Ground	A	H	A	H
Result				
Position				

Updated to match(es) played on 14 August 2021. Source: Austrian Football Bundesliga
A = Away; H = Home; W = Win; D = Draw; L = Loss

==== Matches ====
The league fixtures were announced on 22 June 2021.

14 August 2021 4	Wolfsberger AC	2–2	WSG Tirol	Wolfsberg
17:00 CEST (UTC+2)				Stadium: Lavanttal-Arena
