= Felix Bacher =

Austrian professional football player (born 2000)

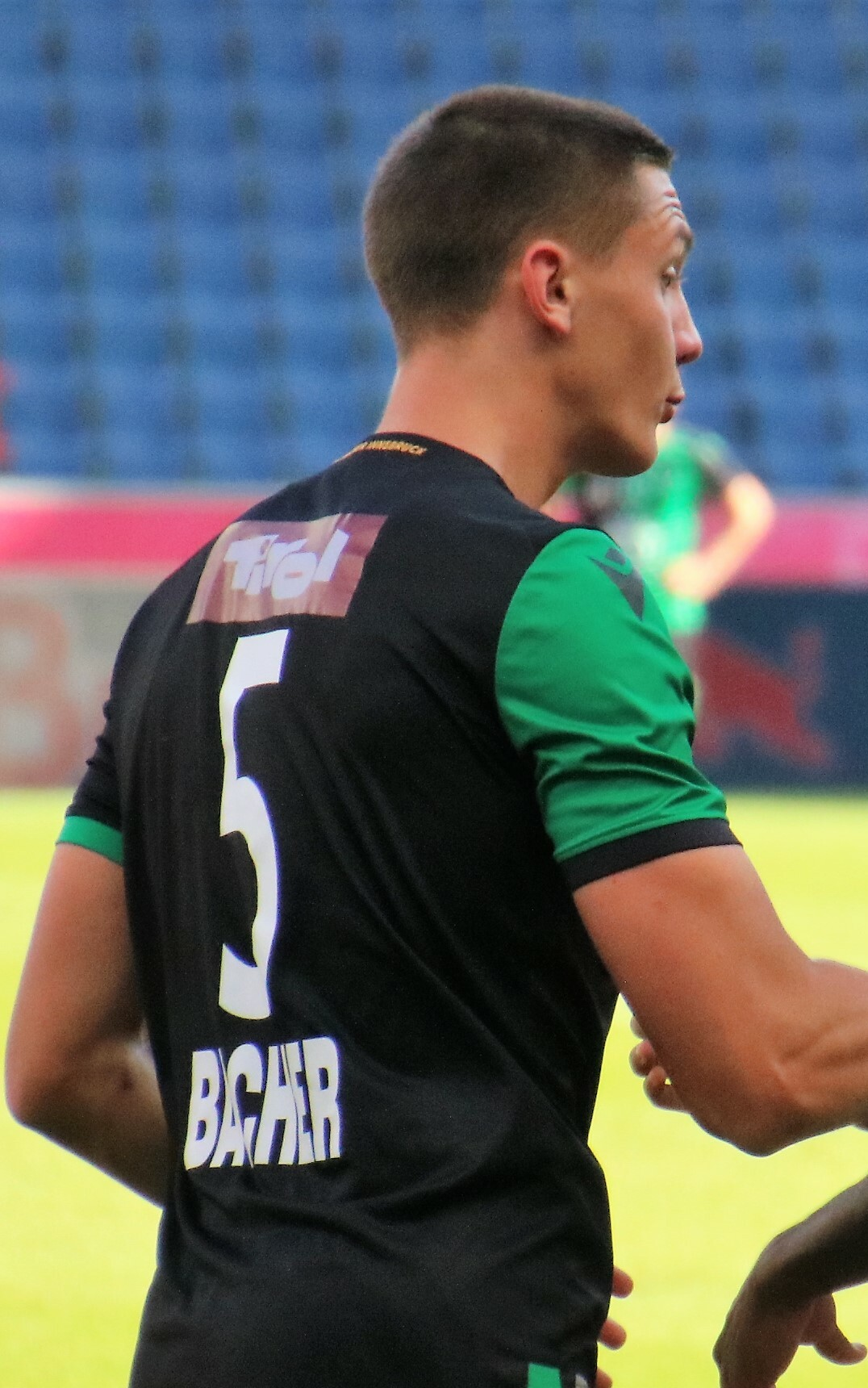
- Bacher in 2019

Personal information
- Date of birth: 25 October 2000 (age 26)
- Place of birth: Lienz, Austria
- Height: 1.90 m (6 ft 3 in)
- Position: Centre-back

Team information
- Current team: Lyon
- Number: 20

Youth career
- 2006–2011: SC Schwaz
- 2011–2018: Wacker Innsbruck

Senior career*
Years	Team	Apps	(Gls)
2018–2020	Wacker Innsbruck II	20	(0)
2019–2020	Wacker Innsbruck	15	(0)
2020–2021	SC Freiburg II	23	(1)
2021–2024	WSG Tirol	75	(2)
2024–2026	Estoril	57	(4)
2026–	Lyon	7	(1)

International career^{‡}
2018	Austria U18	3	(0)
2018	Austria U19	6	(0)
2019	Austria U20	1	(0)
2026–	Austria	2	(0)
- * Club domestic league appearances and goals as of 18 October 2026 ‡ National team caps and goals as of 17 November 2026

Felix Bacher (born 25 October 2000) is an Austrian professional footballer who plays as a centre-back for Ligue 1 club Lyon and the Austria national team.

== Club career ==
Bacher started his career at Wacker Innsbruck before joining German club SC Freiburg's reserve team in 2020. He returned to Austria a year later to join WSG Tirol.

In July 2024, Bacher joined Portuguese club Estoril on a two-year contract. He scored his first goal for the club in stoppage time of a 2–2 Primeira Liga away draw with Nacional on 15 February 2025.

On 2 August 2026, Bacher signed for French club Lyon on a contract until 2031 for a reported transfer fee of €4.3 million, with up to €0.8 million in add-ons.

== International career ==
Bacher is an Austria youth international, having represented the U18, U19 and U20 teams.

In September 2026, he was one of the players who were called up to the Austria national team by head coach Ralf Rangnick, for the 2026–27 UEFA Nations League B matches against Israel, Kosovo (twice) and Republic of Ireland on 24, 27 September, 1 and 4 October 2026.

== Career statistics ==
=== Club ===
As of match played 18 October 2026

Appearances and goals by club, season and competition
Club	Season	League			Cup		Europe		Other		Total	
Club	Season	Division	Apps	Goals	Apps	Goals	Apps	Goals	Apps	Goals	Apps	Goals
Wacker Innsbruck II	2018–19	2. Liga	20	0	—		—		—		20	0
Wacker Innsbruck	2019–20	2. Liga	15	0	3	0	—		—		18	0
SC Freiburg II	2019–20	Regionalliga Südwest	3	0	—		—		—		3	0
SC Freiburg II	2020–21	Regionalliga Südwest	20	1	—		—		—		20	1
SC Freiburg II	Total		23	1	—		—		—		23	1
WSG Tirol	2021–22	Austrian Bundesliga	17	0	2	0	—		3 (Note: Appearances in European play-offs)	0	22	0
WSG Tirol	2022–23	Austrian Bundesliga	30	1	3	0	—		—		33	1
WSG Tirol	2023–24	Austrian Bundesliga	28	1	2	0	—		—		30	1
WSG Tirol	Total		75	2	7	0	—		—		82	2
Estoril	2024–25	Primeira Liga	23	2	—		—		—		23	2
Estoril	2025–26	Primeira Liga	34	2	1	0	—		—		35	2
Estoril	Total		57	4	1	0	—		—		58	4
Lyon	2026–27	Ligue 1	7	1	0	0	2 (Note: Appearances in UEFA Europa League)	0	—		9	1
Career total			196	8	11	0	2	0	3	0	212	8

=== International ===
As of match played 17 November 2026

Appearances and goals by national team and year
National team	Year	Apps	Goals
Austria	2026	2	0
Total		2	0
