= Manprit Sarkaria =

Austrian footballer (born 1996)

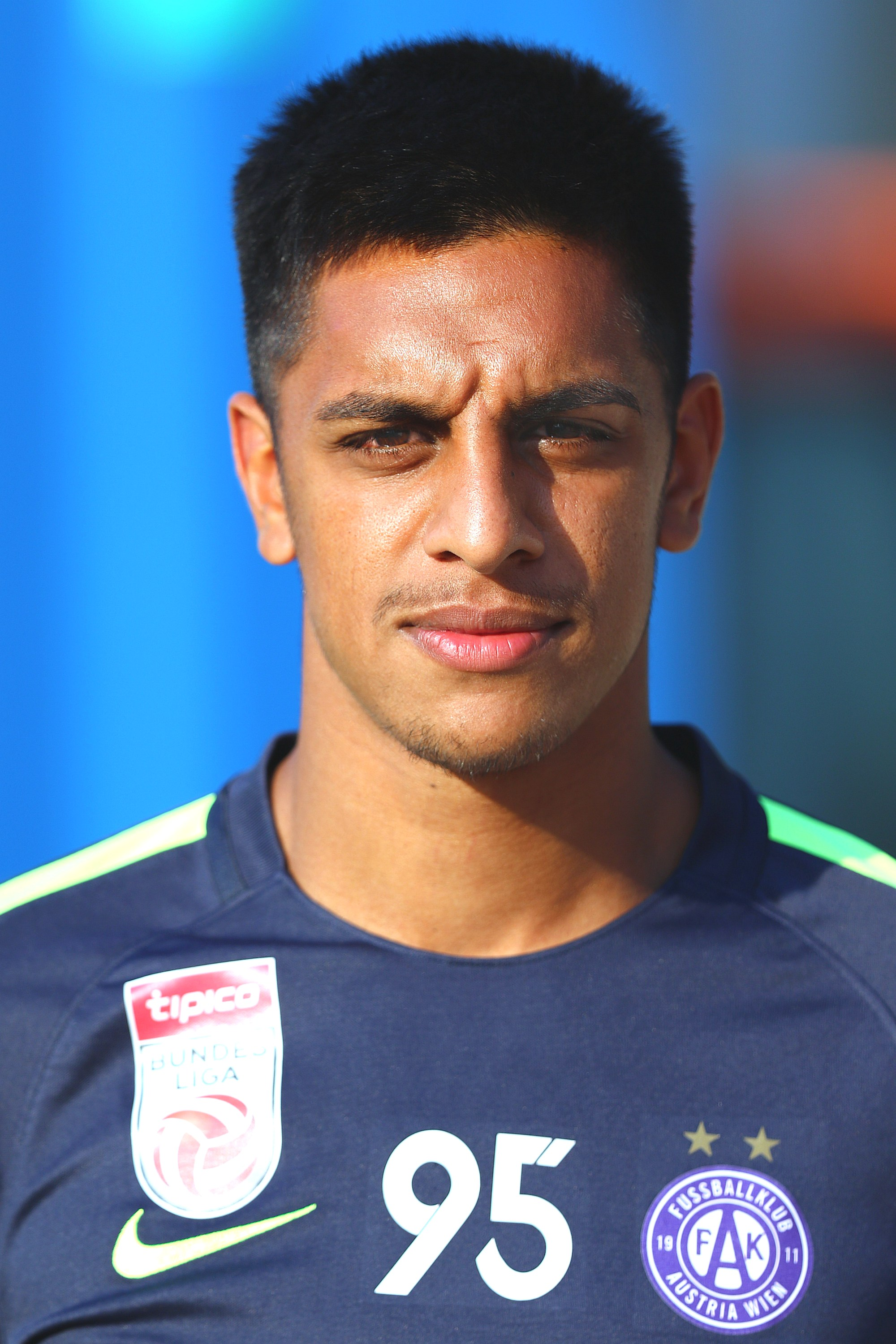
- Sarkaria with Austria Wien in 2018

Personal information
- Date of birth: 26 August 1996 (age 30)
- Place of birth: Vienna, Austria
- Height: 1.80 m (5 ft 11 in)
- Position: Left winger

Team information
- Current team: Austria Wien
- Number: 11

Senior career*
Years	Team	Apps	(Gls)
2017–2021	Austria Wien	69	(11)
2021–2025	Sturm Graz	76	(26)
2024–2025	Sturm Graz II	7	(4)
2025	Shenzhen Peng City	14	(1)
2025–	Austria Wien	9	(2)

International career^{‡}
2023	Austria	1	(0)
- * Club domestic league appearances and goals as of 13 August 2026 ‡ National team caps and goals as of 13 October 2023

Manprit Sarkaria (born 26 August 1996) is an Austrian professional footballer who plays as a left winger for Austrian Bundesliga club Austria Wien.

== Personal life ==
Born in Austria, Sarkaria is a Sikh of Punjabi descent. His family are from Amritsar in Punjab, India. Sarkaria has stated his free kick technique is inspired by former Brazilian footballer Ronaldinho.

== Club career ==
On 14 April 2021, Sturm Graz announced that Sarkaria would be joining the club in the summer when his contract with Austria Wien expired.

On 20 May 2022, Sarkaria extended his contract with Sturm Graz until June 2025.

In May 2023, Sarkaria scored two crucial goals for Sturm Graz to win the Austrian Cup against Rapid Wien. He also became the top scorer during the 2022–23 Austrian Cup campaign. Sturm Graz Manager Christian Ilzer, stated "Because he managed to get out of this difficult situation solely through his own work, through his professional behavior. He was massively rewarded for that with the cup victory."

In March 2024, he suffered a broken ankle and missed the remainder of the 2023–24 season. In the 2024–25 season, he was moved to the club's reserve team in the 2. Liga.

On 20 January 2025, Sturm Graz announced Sarkaria's transfer to Shenzhen Peng City in China.

On 28 June 2025, the Chinese football club announced that Sarkaria was returning to Austria and re-joining Austria Wien.

== Career statistics ==
=== Club ===
As of match played 18 June 2025

Appearances and goals by club, season and competition
Club	Season	League			National cup (Note: Includes Austrian Cup, Chinese FA Cup)		Continental		Total	
Club	Season	Division	Apps	Goals	Apps	Goals	Apps	Goals	Apps	Goals
Austria Wien	2017–18	Austrian Bundesliga	5	0	1	0	2 (Note: Appearance(s) in UEFA Europa League)	0	8	0
Austria Wien	2018–19	Austrian Bundesliga	7	0	1	0	—		8	0
Austria Wien	2019–20	Austrian Bundesliga	24	4	0	0	1	0	25	4
Austria Wien	2020–21	Austrian Bundesliga	33	7	4	3	—		37	10
Austria Wien	Total		69	11	6	3	3	0	78	14
Sturm Graz	2021–22	Austrian Bundesliga	31	13	3	4	8	0	42	17
Sturm Graz	2022–23	Austrian Bundesliga	28	9	6	6	6 (Note: Two appearances in UEFA Champions League, four appearances in UEFA Europa League)	0	40	15
Sturm Graz	2023–24	Austrian Bundesliga	16	4	3	0	9 (Note: Six appearances in UEFA Europa League, two appearances in UEFA Europa Conference League)	0	28	4
Sturm Graz	2024–25	Austrian Bundesliga	1	0	1	1	—		2	1
Sturm Graz	Total		76	26	13	11	23	0	112	37
SK Sturm Graz II	2024–25	Austrian Football Second League	7	4	—		—		7	4
Shenzhen Peng City	2025	Chinese Super League	14	1	1	1	—		15	2
Austria Wien	2025–26	Austrian Bundesliga	0	0	0	0	0	0	0	0
Career total			166	42	20	15	26	0	212	57

=== International ===
As of match played 13 October 2023

Appearances and goals by national team and year
National team	Year	Apps	Goals
Austria	2023	1	0
Total		1	0

== Honours ==
Sturm Graz

- Austrian Bundesliga: 2023–24
- Austrian Cup: 2022–23, 2023–24

Individual

- Austrian Bundesliga Team of the Year: 2021–22

== See also ==
- List of Sikh Footballers
