= Noah Steiner =

Austrian footballer

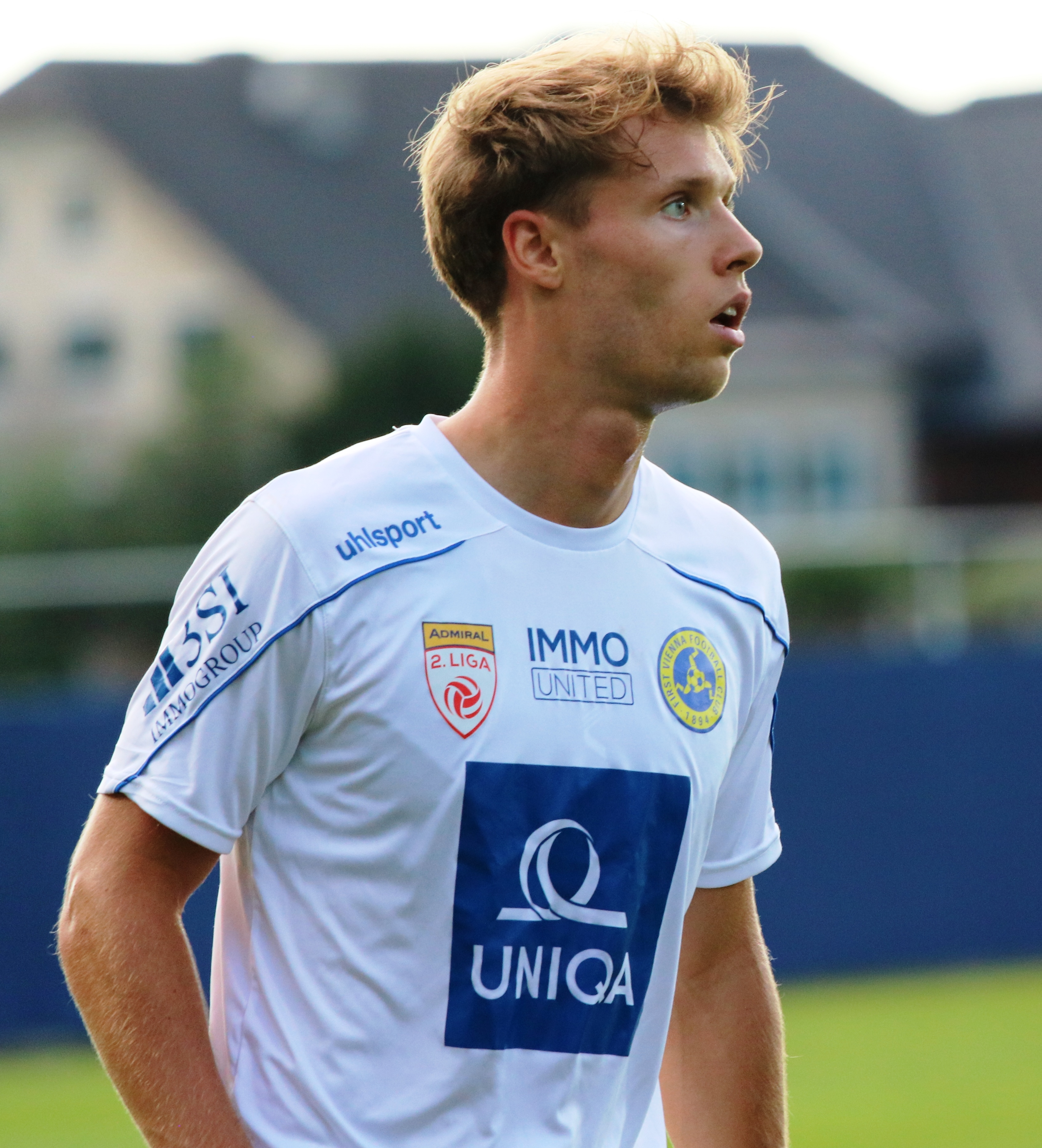

Personal information
- Date of birth: 26 February 1999 (age 27)
- Place of birth: Wien, Austria
- Height: 1.86 m (6 ft 1 in)
- Position: Centre-back

Team information
- Current team: FC Marchfeld Donauauen

Youth career
- 2005–2007: SC Wolkersdorf
- 2007–2018: Austria Wien

Senior career*
Years	Team	Apps	(Gls)
2018–2019	SV Schwechat	26	(0)
2019	St. Pölten II	10	(1)
2019–2020	St. Pölten	5	(0)
2020–2025	First Vienna	106	(8)
2025	Stripfing	9	(8)
2026–	FC Marchfeld Donauauen	16	(2)
- * Club domestic league appearances and goals as of 28 June 2026

Noah Steiner (born 26 February 1999) is an Austrian football player. He plays for FC Marchfeld Donauauen.

== Club career ==
He made his Austrian Football Bundesliga debut for St. Pölten on 24 August 2019 in a game against Mattersburg.

=== First Vienna ===
On 15 January 2020, Steiner joined First Vienna FC on a contract for the rest of the season.
