= Simon Beccari =

Italian footballer

Personal information
- Date of birth: 18 November 1998 (age 27)
- Place of birth: Bolzano, Italy
- Height: 1.88 m (6 ft 2 in)
- Position: Goalkeeper

Youth career
- 2015–2016: Matrei
- 2016–2017: SV Innsbruck
- 2017–2020: WSG Swarovski Tirol

Senior career*
Years	Team	Apps	(Gls)
2017–2023	Tirol	1	(0)
2020–2023	Tirol II	25	(0)
- * Club domestic league appearances and goals as of 6 June 2023

Simon Beccari (born 18 November 1998) is an Italian professional footballer who plays as a goalkeeper.

== Career ==
Born in Italy, Beccari moved to Austria at a young age. He is a youth product of the academies of Matrei, SV Innsbruck, and WSG Swarovski Tirol. He made his professional debut with WSG Swarovski Tirol in a 2–0 Austrian Bundesliga loss to Rapid Wien on 16 February 2020. After his debut in 2020, he mostly played for Tirol's reserve side in the Austrian Regionalliga.

== Personal life ==
Aside from football, Beccari also helps run a series of goalkeeping training camps for youths from South Tyrol.
