= Felix Mandl (footballer) =

Austrian footballer

Personal information
- Date of birth: 5 June 2003 (age 23)
- Height: 1.77 m (5 ft 10 in)
- Position: Forward

Team information
- Current team: FC Dornbirn
- Number: 27

Youth career
- 2009–2010: TSV Fulpmes
- 2010–2017: Wacker Innsbruck
- 2017–2019: AKA Tirol

Senior career*
Years	Team	Apps	(Gls)
2020–2021	Wacker Innsbruck	13	(1)
2021–2022	FC Juniors OÖ	5	(0)
2022	→ Wacker Innsbruck (loan)	0	(0)
2022–	FC Dornbirn	49	(3)

International career^{‡}
2019	Austria U17	2	(0)
- * Club domestic league appearances and goals as of 26 May 2024 ‡ National team caps and goals as of 18:18, 12 April 2020 (UTC)

Felix Mandl (born 5 June 2003) is an Austrian footballer who plays as a forward for FC Dornbirn.

== Club career ==
In the summer of 2021, he signed a three-year contract with FC Juniors OÖ. On 6 February 2022, Mandl returned to Wacker Innsbruck on loan with an option to buy.

== Career statistics ==
=== Club ===
As of 12 April 2020.

Appearances and goals by club, season and competition
Club	Season	League			Cup		Continental		Other		Total	
Club	Season	Division	Apps	Goals	Apps	Goals	Apps	Goals	Apps	Goals	Apps	Goals
Wacker Innsbruck	2019–20	2. Liga	2	0	0	0	–		0	0	2	0
Career total			2	0	0	0	0	0	0	0	2	0
