= Okan Yilmaz (footballer, born 1997) =

Austrian footballer (born 1997)

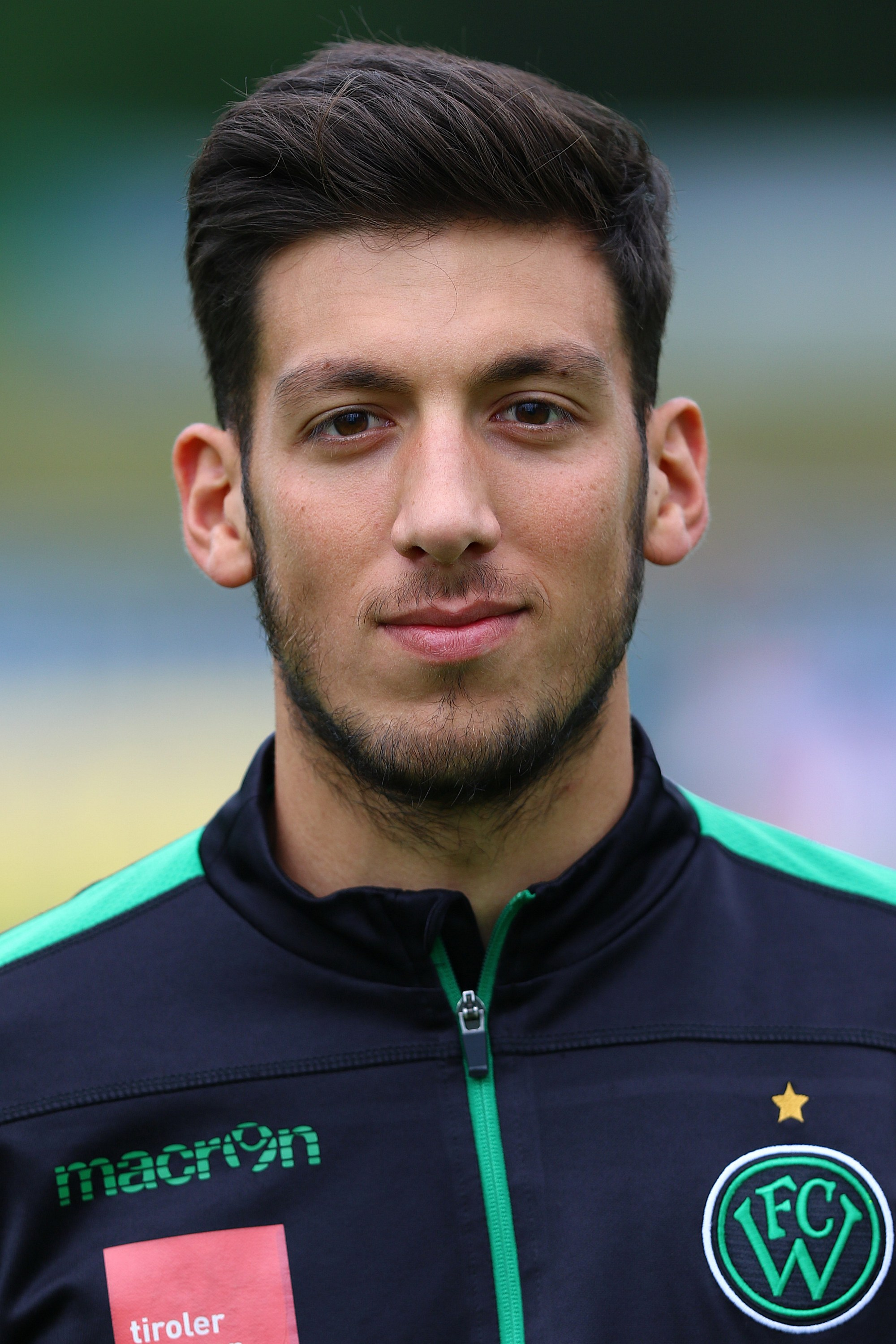

Personal information
- Date of birth: 13 October 1997 (age 29)
- Place of birth: Innsbruck, Austria
- Height: 1.85 m (6 ft 1 in)
- Position: Forward

Team information
- Current team: FC Wacker Innsbruck
- Number: 9

Youth career
- 2003–2009: Innsbrucker SK
- 2009–2014: FC Wacker Innsbruck

Senior career*
| Years | Team | Apps | (Gls) |
| 2015–2019 | FC Wacker Innsbruck II | 62 | (17) |
| 2018–2019 | FC Wacker Innsbruck | 17 | (0) |
| 2019–2020 | Vorwärts Steyr | 27 | (8) |
| 2020–2021 | SKU Amstetten | 5 | (0) |
| 2021–2022 | Menemenspor | 8 | (0) |
| 2021–2022 | → Karşıyaka (loan) | 10 | (2) |
| 2022–2023 | SV Horn | 37 | (8) |
| 2023– | FC Wacker Innsbruck | 54 | (24) |
- * Club domestic league appearances and goals as of 26 June 2026

Okan Yilmaz (born 13 October 1997) is an Austrian professional footballer who plays for 2. Liga club FC Wacker Innsbruck.

== Club career ==
On 7 February 2022, Yilmaz signed with SV Horn until the end of the season.

== Personal life ==
Born in Austria, Yilmaz is of Turkish descent.
