= Paul Kiedl =

Austrian professional footballer (born 2001)

Personal information
- Full name: Paul Kiedl
- Date of birth: 2 October 2001 (age 25)
- Place of birth: Deutschlandsberg, Austria
- Height: 1.91 m (6 ft 3 in)
- Position: Striker

Team information
- Current team: Kremser
- Number: 11

Youth career
- SV Schwanberg
- SK Sturm Graz
- DSC Wonisch
- Kapfenberger SV
- –2020: Grazer AK

Senior career*
Years	Team	Apps	(Gls)
2020–2024	Grazer AK	30	(3)
2023	→ SC Kalsdorf (loan)	12	(3)
2023–2024	→ USV St. Anna (loan)	25	(6)
2024–2025	Weiz	25	(6)
2025–	Kremser	26	(3)
- * Club domestic league appearances and goals as of 28 June 2026

Paul Kiedl (born 2 October 2001) is an Austrian professional footballer who plays as a striker for Kremser.

== Early life ==
Kiedl was born in Deutschlandsberg, Austria.

== Club career ==
=== Grazer AK ===
Kiedl started his career with Grazer AK. He made his professional debut for Grazer AK in 2020, playing 8 games in his first season going professional, and scoring 2 goals, his best season recorded yet. Kiedl played 11 games the following season (2020–21), his highest tally of league games in a single season, and the next season, Kiedl got a goal and an assist in 8 games. In the 2022–23 season, Kiedl played his first cup game, and in January, with 3 league appearances, and 1 cup appearance,

=== SC Kalsdorf (loan) ===
Kiedl signed on loan with SC Kalsdorf in January 2023.

=== USV St. Anna ===
Kiedl joined USV St. Anna for the 2023–24 season.

== Personal life ==
Kiedl has a younger brother named Peter, who plays for SK Sturm Graz II.
