= Arne Ammerer =

Austrian footballer (born 1996)

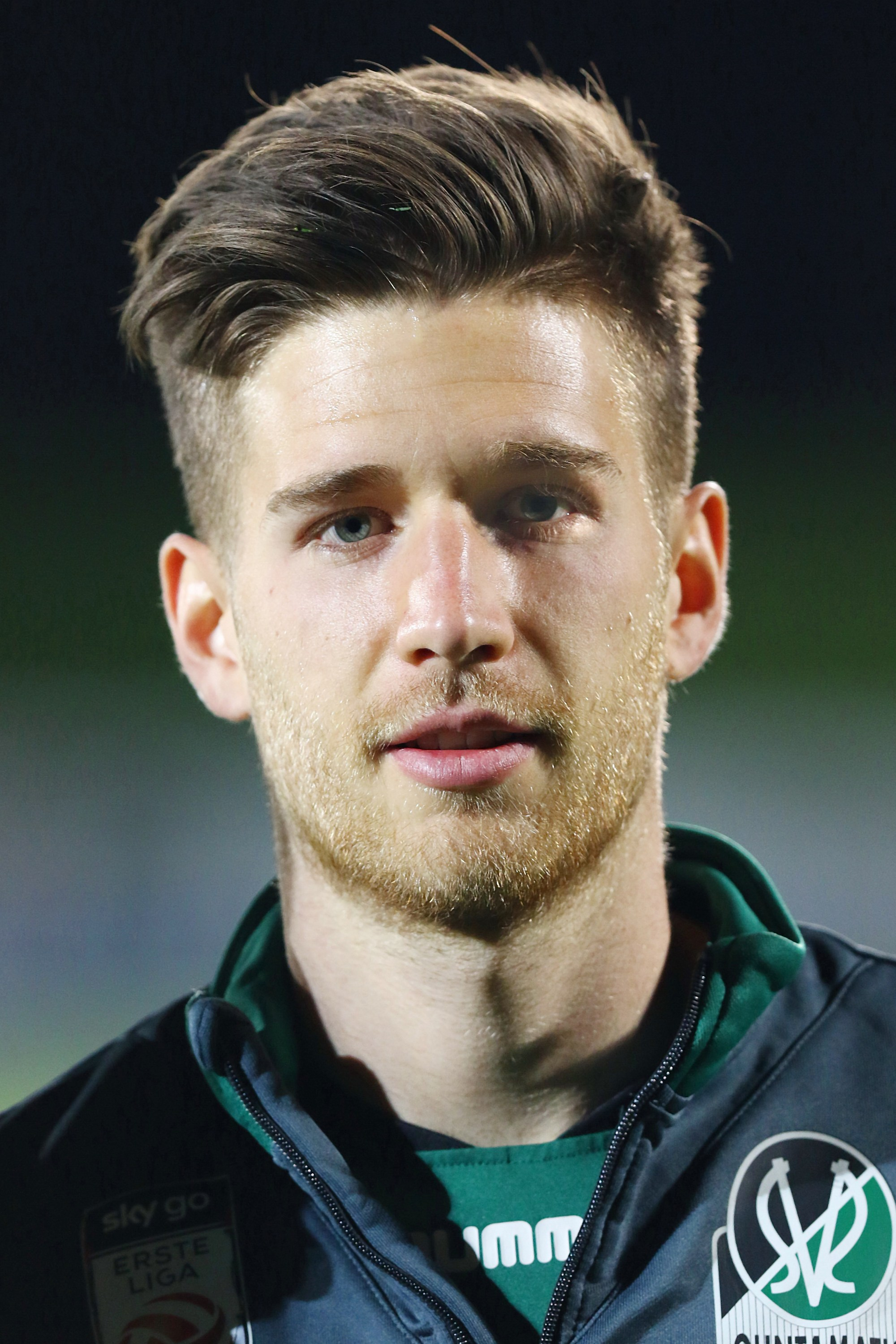

Personal information
- Date of birth: 18 September 1996 (age 30)
- Place of birth: Bad Gastein, Austria
- Height: 1.80 m (5 ft 11 in)
- Position: Midfielder

Team information
- Current team: ASKÖ Oedt
- Number: 14

Youth career
- 2003–2010: FC Bad Gastein
- 2010–2014: SV Ried

Senior career*
Years	Team	Apps	(Gls)
2013–2020	SV Ried II	106	(11)
2017–2021	SV Ried	45	(1)
2021–2023	SKU Amstetten	69	(1)
2023–	ASKÖ Oedt	83	(5)
- * Club domestic league appearances and goals as of 27 June 2026

Arne Ammerer (born 18 September 1996) is an Austrian professional footballer who plays for ASKÖ Oedt.

== Club career ==
He made his Austrian Football First League debut for SV Ried on 28 July 2017 in a game against SC Austria Lustenau.

On 14 July 2023, Ammerer joined ASKÖ Oedt.

== Honours ==
SV Ried

- Austrian Second League: 2019–20
