= Benjamin Ozegovic =

Austrian footballer

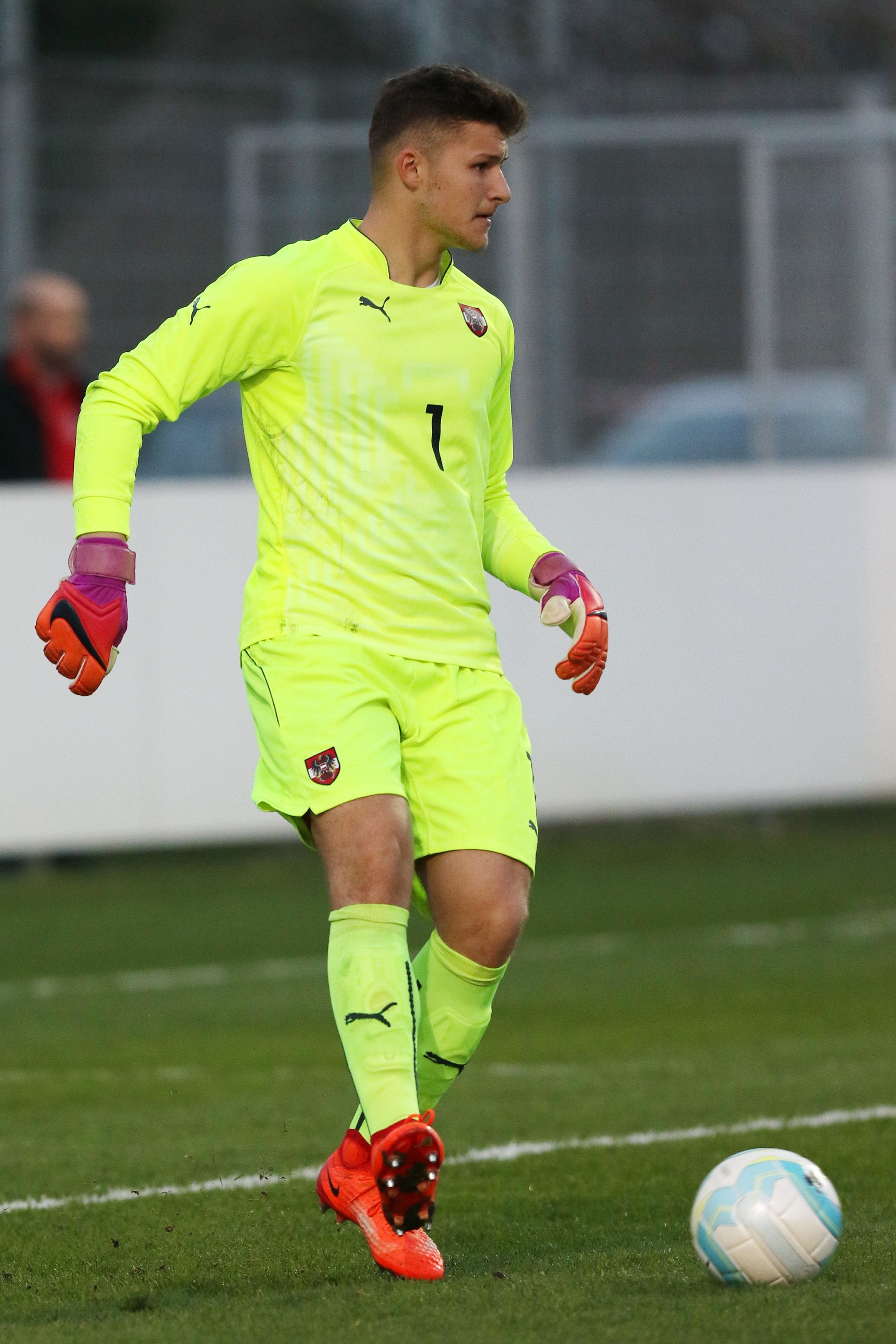
- Ozegovic in 2017

Personal information
- Date of birth: 9 August 1999 (age 27)
- Place of birth: Velika Kladuša, Bosnia and Herzegovina
- Height: 1.84 m (6 ft 0 in)
- Position: Goalkeeper

Team information
- Current team: FC Liefering
- Number: 1

Youth career
- 2008–2013: Sturm Graz
- 2013–2016: Austria Wien

Senior career*
Years	Team	Apps	(Gls)
2016–2020	Rheindorf Altach II	52	(0)
2020	Rheindorf Altach	2	(0)
2020–2023	WSG Tirol II	5	(0)
2020–2024	WSG Tirol	21	(0)
2024–	FC Liefering	5	(0)

International career
2016	Austria U17	6	(0)
2016–2017	Austria U18	5	(0)
2018	Austria U19	2	(0)
- * Club domestic league appearances and goals as of 17 May 2026

Benjamin Ozegovic (Bosnian: Ožegović; born 9 August 1999) is a professional footballer who plays as a goalkeeper for 2. Liga club FC Liefering. Born in Bosnia and Herzegovina, Ozegovic represented Austria internationally at youth levels.

== Club career ==
Ozegovic is a product of the youth academies of Sturm Graz and Austria Wien. On 27 June 2016, he signed with Rheindorf Altach. Ozegovic made his professional debut with Rheindorf Altach in a 2-0 Austrian Bundesliga loss to Admira Wacker on 7 March 2020.

== International career ==
Born in Bosnia and Herzegovina, Ozegovic moved to Austria at a young age. He is a youth international for Austria, having represented them from U17 to U19 levels.
