= Cem Üstündağ =

Austrian footballer (born 2001)

- Üstündağ in 2026

Personal information
- Date of birth: 20 January 2001 (age 25)
- Place of birth: Schwaz, Austria
- Height: 1.83 m (6 ft 0 in)
- Position: Midfielder

Team information
- Current team: Amedspor
- Number: 6

Youth career
- 2008–2011: SV Schlitters
- 2011–2015: FC Wacker Innsbruck
- 2015–2024: AKA Tirol
- 2015–2024: WSG Tirol

Senior career*
Years	Team	Apps	(Gls)
2020–2024	WSG Tirol II	46	(3)
2022–2025	WSG Tirol	53	(2)
2025–2026	Kasımpaşa	18	(0)
2026-	Amedspor	20	(0)
- * Club domestic league appearances and goals as of 10 October 2026

Cem Üstündağ (born 20 January 2001) is an Austrian professional footballer who plays as a midfielder for Süper Lig club Amedspor in Turkey.

== Career ==
Üstündağ is a youth product of SV Schlitters, FC Wacker Innsbruck, AKA Tirol and WSG Tirol. On 10 July 2022, he signed his first professional contract with WSG Tirol. He made his senior and professional debut with WSG Tirol in a 3–1 Austrian Cup win over SC Neusiedl on 15 July 2022. On 26 May 2025, he left the club despite a contract offer. On 1 July 2025, Üstündağ transferred to the Turkish Süper Lig club Kasımpaşa on a 2-year contract.

== Personal life ==
Born in Austria, Üstündağ is of Turkish descent.
