= Johannes Naschberger =

Austrian association footballer

Personal information
- Date of birth: 25 January 2000 (age 26)
- Place of birth: Lienz, Austria
- Height: 1.73 m (5 ft 8 in)
- Position: Midfielder

Team information
- Current team: Tirol
- Number: 17

Youth career
- 2006–2009: FC Wildschönau
- 2009–2012: Wacker Innsbruck
- 2012–2013: Liefering
- 2013–2015: Red Bull Salzburg
- 2015–2017: AKA Tirol

Senior career*
Years	Team	Apps	(Gls)
2017–2020	Wörgl	55	(10)
2020–2022	Tirol II	3	(1)
2020–2026	Tirol	151	(3)
- * Club domestic league appearances and goals as of 10 June 2026

Johannes Naschberger (born 25 January 2000) is an Austrian professional footballer who plays as a midfielder. He was born in Austria to German parents.

== Career ==
Naschberger is a youth product of the academies of FC Wildschönau, Wacker Innsbruck, Liefering, Red Bull Salzburg, and AKA Tirol. He began his senior career with Wörgl in 2017. On 14 August 2020, he transferred to Tirol. On 19 August 2021, he extended his contract with Tirol until the summer of 2024.
