= Florian Prohart =

Austrian footballer (born 1999)

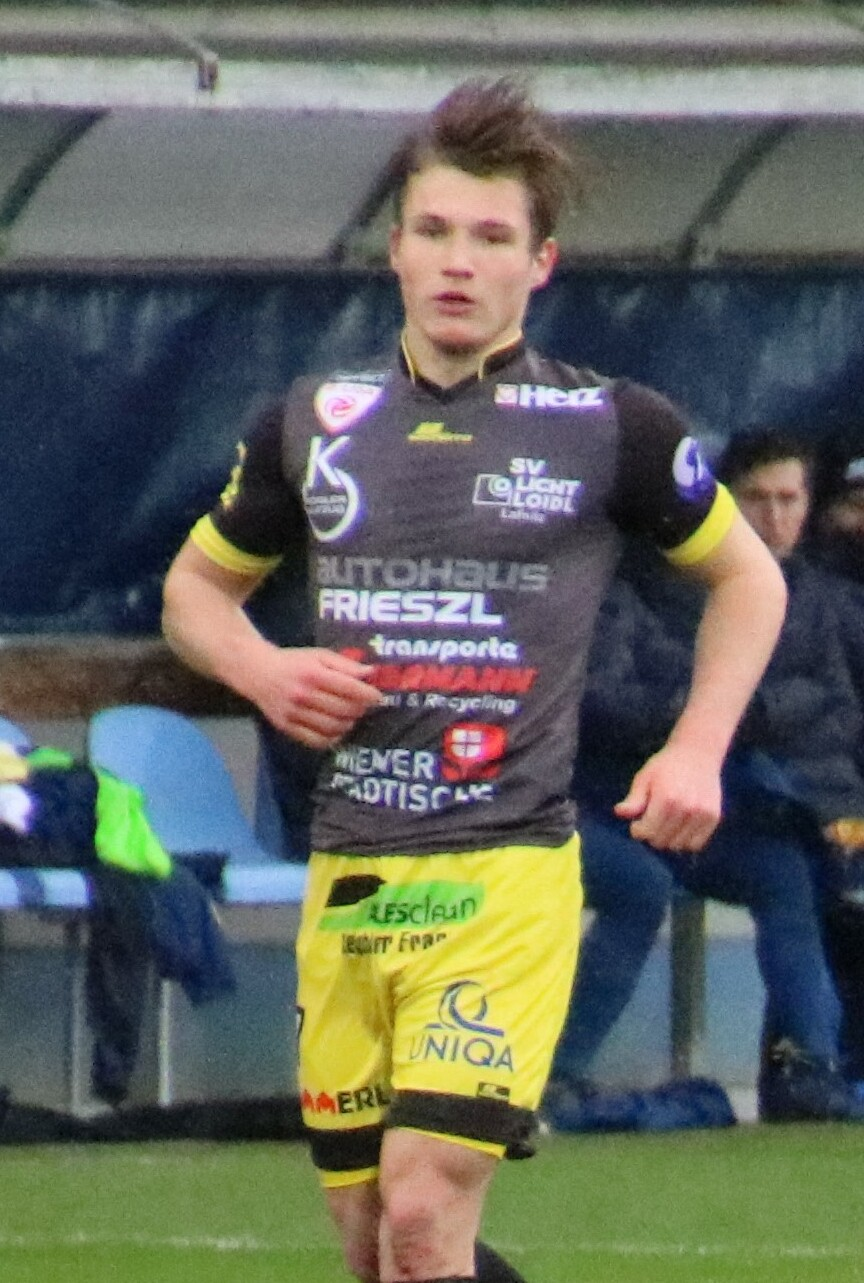
- Prohart in 2020

Personal information
- Full name: Florian Harald Prohart
- Date of birth: 12 January 1999 (age 27)
- Place of birth: Klagenfurt, Austria
- Height: 1.72 m (5 ft 8 in)
- Position: Midfielder

Team information
- Current team: First Vienna FC
- Number: 10

Youth career
- 2004–2011: FC Welzenegg
- 2011: SC Ebental
- 2011–2013: FC Welzenegg
- 2013–2015: SK Rapid Wien
- 2015–2016: Wolfsberger AC

Senior career*
| Years | Team | Apps | (Gls) |
| 2016–2018 | Wolfsberger AC | 1 | (0) |
| 2018–2024 | SV Lafnitz | 120 | (3) |
| 2024–2025 | Kapfenberger SV | 32 | (3) |
| 2026– | First Vienna FC | 13 | (1) |

International career^{‡}
| 2016 | Austria U18 | 3 | (0) |
- * Club domestic league appearances and goals as of 17 May 2026 ‡ National team caps and goals as of 11 November 2016

Florian Harald Prohart (born 12 January 1999) is an Austrian professional footballer who plays as a midfielder for First Vienna FC.

== Club career ==
He made his Austrian Football Bundesliga debut for Wolfsberger AC on 17 December 2016 in a game against FC Red Bull Salzburg.
