= Ferdinand Oswald =

German footballer

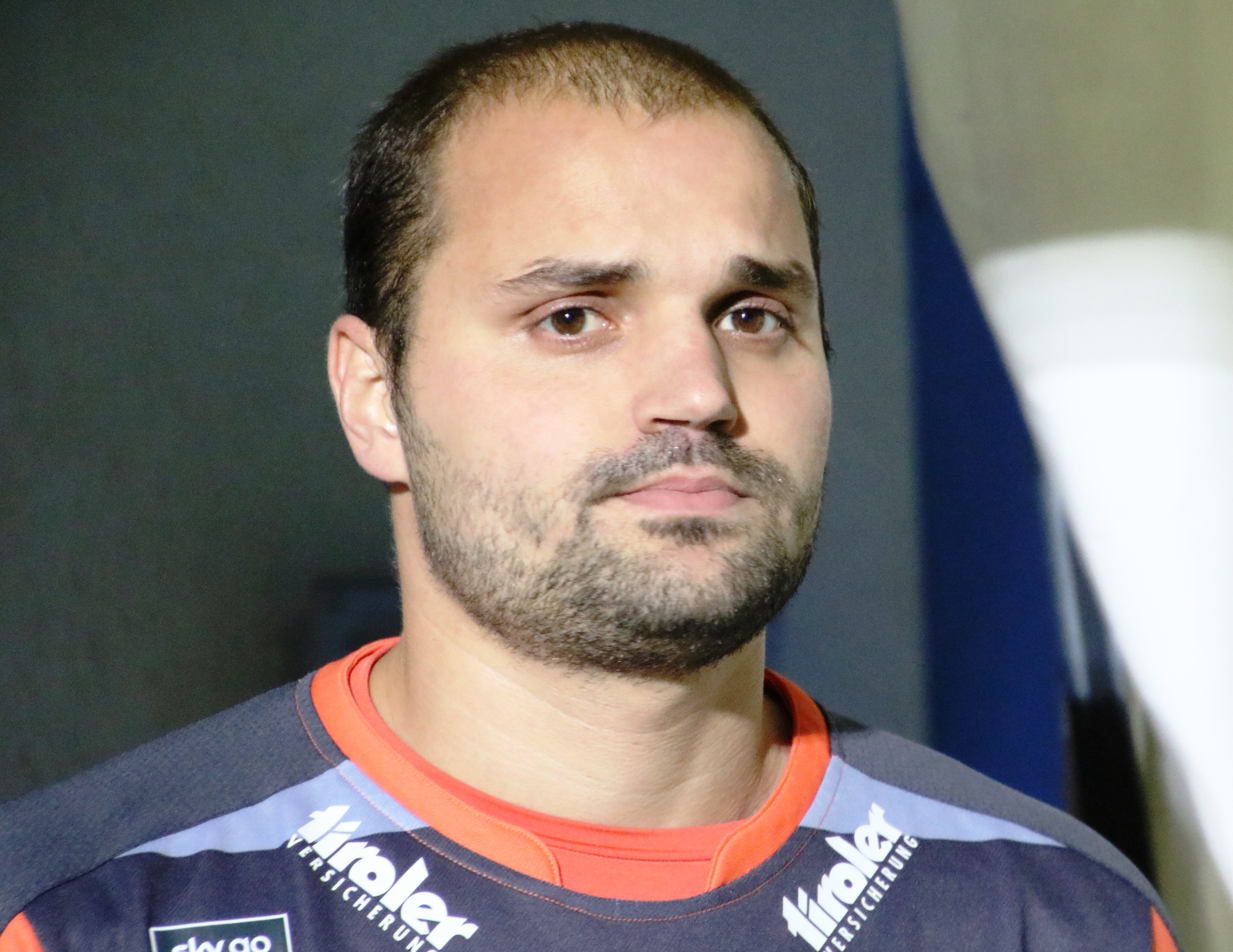
- Oswald in 2016

Personal information
- Date of birth: 5 October 1990 (age 36)
- Place of birth: Weilheim, Germany
- Height: 1.84 m (6 ft 0 in)
- Position: Goalkeeper

Youth career
- 1994–2004: TSV Hohenpeißenberg
- 2004–2009: Bayern Munich

Senior career*
Years	Team	Apps	(Gls)
2009–2011	Bayern Munich II	5	(0)
2011–2012	WSG Wattens	29	(0)
2012–2014	Schalke 04 II	65	(0)
2014–2024	WSG Tirol	267	(0)
Total		356	(0)

International career
2007	Germany U17	1	(0)
- * Club domestic league appearances and goals

Ferdinand Oswald (born 5 October 1990) is a German former professional footballer who played as a goalkeeper, spending most of his career with WSG Tirol.

== Career ==
Oswald joined Bayern Munich in 2004, and was promoted to the reserve team five years later. He made his debut in a 3. Liga match against Werder Bremen II in November 2009. His third appearance for the team was as an outfield player – for the second game of the 2010–11 season, Bayern II had a player shortage, and Oswald was one of only two players on the substitutes bench. The other sub, Thomas Kurz had already come on when striker Saër Sène suffered an injury, so Oswald came on and played the remainder of the game in midfield. The match, against Wacker Burghausen, ended in a 1–1 draw. He was released by Bayern at the end of the 2010–11 season and signed for Austrian side WSG Wattens. A year later he returned to Germany to sign for Schalke 04 II. Oswald returned to WSG Wattens in 2014.

In May 2024, following two spinal disc herniations, Oswald announced he would retire from playing at the end of the 2023–24 season.
