= Osarenren Okungbowa =

Austrian footballer

Personal information
- Full name: Osarenren Okungbowa
- Date of birth: 13 May 1994 (age 32)
- Place of birth: Vienna, Austria
- Height: 1.89 m (6 ft 2 in)
- Position: Defensive midfielder

Team information
- Current team: Lamphun Warriors

Youth career
- 2003–2009: SV Hirschstetten
- 2009: SV Essling
- 2009–2010: SR Donaufeld Wien
- 2010–2016: Rapid Wien

Senior career*
Years	Team	Apps	(Gls)
2012–2018	Rapid Wien II	54	(0)
2016–2018	Rapid Wien	2	(0)
2018–2019	St. Pölten II	9	(1)
2018–2019	St. Pölten	0	(0)
2019–2020	Floridsdorfer AC	26	(1)
2020–2021	VfB Lübeck	31	(2)
2021–2022	Kickers Offenbach	29	(3)
2022–2025	WSG Tirol	53	(1)
2025–2026	First Vienna	12	(0)
2026–	Lamphun Warriors	0	(0)
- * Club domestic league appearances and goals as of 17 May 2026

Osarenren Okungbowa (born 13 May 1995) is an Austrian professional footballer who plays as a defensive midfielder for Lamphun Warriors.

== Club career ==
The son of an Edo(Bini) father and an Igbo mother, Okungbowa joined Rapid Wien in 2010 from the amateur club Donaufeld. He made his professional debut for Rapid Wien in a 2–1 loss against Sturm Graz on 27 November 2016.

On 18 January 2019, Okungbowa signed for the rest of the season with Floridsdorfer AC.

He signed for German 3. Liga side VfB Lübeck on a one-year contract in July 2020. He followed that up with a stint with Kickers Offenbach from 2021 to 2022 before returning to Austria with WSG Tirol on 3 August 2022.

== International career ==
Okungbowa is born in Austria to Nigerian parents (Edo father and Igbo mother).
