= Lukas Gabbichler =

Austrian footballer

Personal information
- Date of birth: 12 May 1998 (age 28)
- Place of birth: Austria
- Height: 1.86 m (6 ft 1 in)
- Position: Midfielder

Team information
- Current team: Floridsdorfer AC
- Number: 22

Senior career*
Years	Team	Apps	(Gls)
2017–2019	SC Weiz	51	(18)
2019–2021	TSV Hartberg	14	(1)
2021–2023	Grazer AK	38	(7)
2023–2024	SC Weiz	27	(18)
2024–	Floridsdorfer AC	58	(15)
- * Club domestic league appearances and goals as of 17 May 2026

Lukas Gabbichler (born 12 May 1998) is an Austrian footballer who plays for Floridsdorfer AC.
