= Justin Forst =

Austrian association footballer

Personal information
- Date of birth: 21 February 2003 (age 23)
- Place of birth: Innsbruck, Austria
- Height: 1.80 m (5 ft 11 in)
- Position: Striker

Team information
- Current team: Admira Wacker
- Number: 11

Youth career
- 2008–2010: Innsbrucker SK
- 2010–2017: SV Innsbruck
- 2017–2021: AKA Tirol

Senior career*
Years	Team	Apps	(Gls)
2018–2019	SV InnsbruckII	4	(4)
2019–2020	SV Innsbruck	6	(2)
2021–2025	Tirol II	39	(38)
2021–2025	Tirol	47	(2)
2025	ASK Voitsberg	14	(0)
2025–	Admira Wacker	28	(6)

International career^{‡}
2022	Austria U19	5	(0)
- * Club domestic league appearances and goals as of 17 May 2026 ‡ National team caps and goals as of 19:46, 6 July 2022 (UTC)

Justin Forst (born 21 February 2003) is an Austrian professional footballer who plays as a striker for Admira Wacker.

== Career ==
Forst is a youth product of the academies of Innsbrucker SK, SV Innsbruck and AKA Tirol. He began his senior career with SV Innsbruck in 2018. On 9 June 2021, Forst transferred to Tirol. He made his professional debut with Tirol in a 2–2 Austrian Football Bundesliga tie with Hartberg on 17 October 2021.

On 23 June 2025, Forst signed a contract with Admira Wacker.

== International career ==
Forst is a youth international for Austria, having represented the Austria U19s at the 2022 UEFA European Under-19 Championship.
