= Thomas Silberberger =

Austrian footballer and manager

Personal information
- Date of birth: 3 June 1973 (age 53)
- Place of birth: Innsbruck, Austria
- Height: 1.82 m (5 ft 11 1/2 in)
- Position: Midfielder

Team information
- Current team: Wolfsberger (manager)

Youth career
- 1982–1990: SV Wörgl

Senior career*
Years	Team	Apps	(Gls)
1990–1993	SV Wörgl		
1993–1996	FC Tirol	52	(2)
1996–1997	Grazer AK	3	(0)
1997–2000	SV Wörgl	54	(16)
2000–2001	Wüstenrot Salzburg	25	(1)
2001–2005	SV Wörgl	102	(18)
2005–2010	FC Kufstein	18	(1)

International career
1994–1995	Austria U21	7	(0)

Managerial career
- 2007–2013: FC Kufstein
- 2013–2024: WSG Tirol
- 2024–2026: FC Admira Wacker Mödling
- 2026–2026: Wolfsberger
- * Club domestic league appearances and goals

Thomas Silberberger (born 3 June 1973) is an Austrian football manager and former footballer who played as a midfielder. He is the manager of Austrian Bundesliga club Wolfsberger.
