= Denis Tomic =

Austrian association footballer

Personal information
- Date of birth: 27 January 1998 (age 28)
- Place of birth: Austria
- Height: 1.84 m (6 ft 0 in)
- Position: Striker

Team information
- Current team: DSV Leoben
- Number: 8

Youth career
- 2003–2013: Absam

Senior career*
Years	Team	Apps	(Gls)
2013–2014	Absam II	13	(6)
2013–2014	Absam	15	(1)
2014–2018	Austria Wien II	4	(1)
2018–2019	Absam	24	(19)
2019–2020	Wacker Innsbruck II	14	(4)
2020–2024	Tirol II	22	(5)
2021–2024	Tirol	42	(3)
2024–	DSV Leoben	15	(2)

International career^{‡}
2014	Austria U17	1	(0)
- * Club domestic league appearances and goals as of 8 November 2024 ‡ National team caps and goals as of 19:46, 6 July 2022 (UTC)

Denis Tomic (born 17 January 1998) is an Austrian professional footballer who plays as a striker for DSV Leoben.

== Career ==
Tomic is a product of the youth academy of Absam. He began his senior career with them in 2013, and in 2014 moved to the academy of Austria Wien. In 2016, he was promoted to Austria Wien's reserves. In 2018, he returned to Absam before moving to the reserves of Wacker Innsbruck the following year. In 2020, he transferred to Tirol, and in June 2021 was promoted to their senior team.

On 24 June 2024, Tomic signed with DSV Leoben in the third-tier Austrian Regionalliga Central.

== International career ==
Tomic is a youth international for Austria, having represented the Austria U17s once in 2014.
