= 2023–24 Austrian Cup =

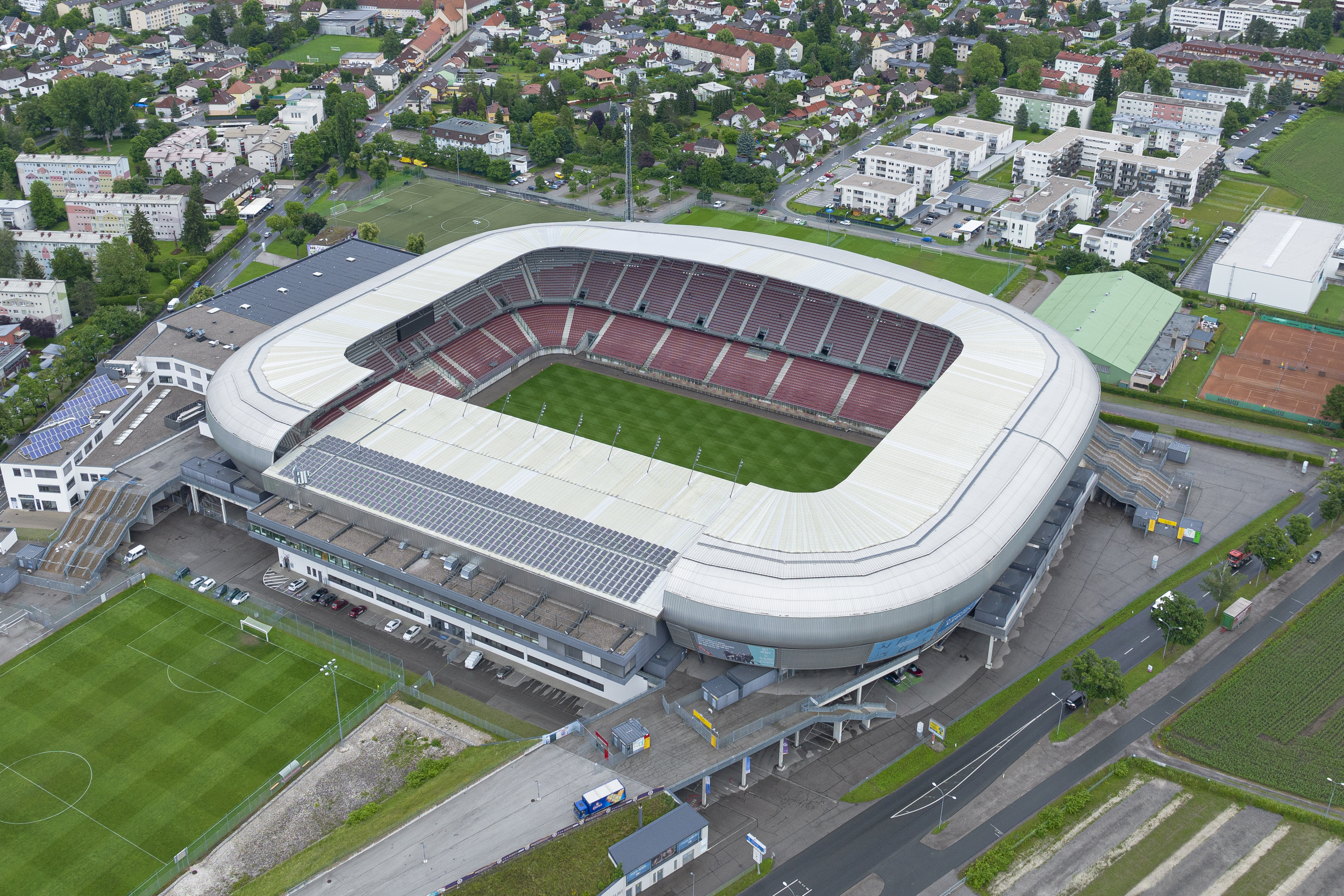
- Wörthersee Stadion hosted the final

Tournament details
- Country: Austria
- Teams: 64

Final positions
- Champions: Sturm Graz
- Runners-up: SK Rapid Wien

Tournament statistics
- Matches played: 63
- Goals scored: 195 (3.1 per match)
- Top goal scorer(s): Marco Grüll (6 goals)
- All statistics correct as of 1 May 2024.

The 2023–24 Austrian Cup was the 93rd edition of the national cup in Austrian football. The winners qualified for the 2024–25 Europa League play-off round. Sturm Graz were the defending champions, having defeated Rapid Wien in the 2023 final. Match times up to 29 October 2023 and from 31 March 2024 are CEST (UTC+2). Times on interim ("winter") days are CET (UTC+1).

Sturm Graz retained the cup on 1 May 2024, defeating Rapid Wien 2–1 in the final (a repeat of the previous season's final). Since they qualified based on league position, the Europa League spot from the Cup was passed to the third-placed team of the 2023–24 Austrian Football Bundesliga.

== Round dates ==
The schedule of the competition is as follows.

Round	Match date
Round 1	21–23 July 2023
Round 2	26–28 September 2023
Round 3	31 October – 2 November 2023
Quarter-finals	9–11 February 2024
Semi-finals	2–4 April 2024
Final	1 May 2024 at Wörthersee Stadion, Klagenfurt

== First round ==
Thirty-two first round matches were played between 21 July and 23 July 2023. The draw was held on Sunday, June 25 as part of the Sport am Sonntag program. The draw was conducted by sibling paraski racers Johannes Aigner and Veronika Aigner.

Number of teams per tier still in competition
Bundesliga (I)	2. League (II)	Regionalliga (III)	Landesliga (IV)	Total
12 / 12	14 / 14	27 / 27	11 / 11	64 / 64

20 July 2023	SC Neusiedl am See 1919 (III)	1–4	SV Licht-Loidl Lafnitz (II)	Neusiedl am See
11:00	M. Toth (yellow card) 31'; D. Toth (yellow card) 64'; S. Toth 68' (pen.); Gatti (yellow card) 81'	Report	Leipold 6'; Poldrugac 13', 28'; Prohart (yellow card) 45+1'; Siegl (yellow card) 81', (goal) 87'	Stadium: Sportzentrum Neusiedl; Attendance: 421; Referee: Robert Radev

21 July 2023	SC Röfix Röthis (III)	0–6	LASK (I)	Röthis
10:00	Scheichl (yellow card) 17'; Schöch (red card) 21'	Report	Ljubičić 24'; Koné 50', 57'; Mustapha 69'; Ziereis 84'; Goiginger 86'	Stadium: Sportplatz an der Ratz; Attendance: 1,000; Referee: Walter Altman

21 July 2023	SV Spittal/Drau (IV)	0–7	FK Austria Wien (I)	Spittal an der Drau
10:00		Report	Tabaković 12'; Fischer 35', 58'; Holland 38'; Jukic 45+2'; Huskovic 80'; Fitz 88'	Stadium: Goldeck-Stadion; Attendance: 1,700; Referee: Florian Jaeger

21 July 2023	ASK Sparkasse Stadtwerke Voitsberg (III)	1–2 (a.e.t.)	First Vienna FC (II)	Voitsberg
11:00	Sulzer 1'; Allmannsdorfer (yellow card) 45'	Report	Abazovic (yellow card) 15'; Omerovic (yellow card) 40'; Monschein 69', 117'	Stadium: Münzer Bioindustrie Sportpark Voitsberg; Attendance: 800; Referee: Stefan Macanovic

21 July 2023	DSC Wonisch Installationen (III)	1–1 (a.e.t.) (5–6 p)	Kapfenberger SV (II)	Deutschlandsberg
11:00	Grubelnik (yellow card) 28'; Degen (yellow card) 71'; Tisaj 86' (yellow card) 87'	Report	Walchhütter (yellow card) 36'; Seidl (yellow card) 64'; Mandler 66'; Mišković (yellow card) 74'; Murza (yellow card) 74'; Graschi (yellow card) 84'; Puschl (yellow card) 85'	Stadium: Koralmstadion; Attendance: 800; Referee: Oliver Fluch
	Penalties
	Tisaj (penalty scored); Lipp (penalty scored); Degen (penalty scored); Wildbacher (penalty scored); Predanic (penalty missed); Weinberger (penalty scored); Mesaric (penalty missed)		(penalty scored) Szerencsi; (penalty scored) Pichorner; (penalty scored) Hassler; (penalty missed) N'Zi; (penalty scored) Seidl; (penalty scored) Mišković; (penalty scored) Duric

21 July 2023	SC Imst (III)	2–0	Schwarz-Weiß Bregenz (II)	Imst
11:00	Marberger (yellow card) 14'; Lorenz 26', 90+1' (yellow card) 89'; Jamnig (yellow card) 30'; Zimmerschied (yellow card) 69'; Schmiederer (yellow card) 77'; R. Schneebauer (yellow card) 80'; N. Schneebauer (yellow card) 86'	Report	Gabryel (yellow card) 30'; Barada (yellow card) 77'; Dodig (yellow card) 86'; Adriel (yellow card) 90'	Stadium: Velly Arena; Attendance: 980; Referee: Julian Schnur

21 July 2023	SV sedda Bad Schallerbach (IV)	2–3 (a.e.t.)	WSG Tirol (I)	Bad Schallerbach
11:00	Fröschl (yellow card) 9' (goal) 31'; Gremsl (yellow card) 25'; Frank (yellow card) 101'; Guerrib 109'	Report	Buksa 20', 114'; Naschberger (yellow card) 41'; Müller 97'; Kronberger (yellow card) 101'; Forst (red card) 102'	Stadium: Sportplatz SV Sedda Bad Schallerbach; Attendance: 700; Referee: Gabriel Gmeiner

21 July 2023	Traiskirchen FCM (III)	1–1	Cashpoint SCR Altach (I)	Traiskirchen
11:00	Schneider 24' (yellow card) 76'; Zdichynec (yellow card) 41'; Helleparth (yellow card) 61'; Mujanović (yellow card) 62'; Tercek (yellow card) 65'	Report	Gustavo 75'; Bähre (yellow card) 76'; Fadinger 82'	Stadium: ARBÖ-Arena; Attendance: 400; Referee: Christian-Petru Ciochirca

21 July 2023	FC Marchfeld Donauauen (III)	1–1 (a.e.t.) (4–2 p)	SC Weiz (III)	Mannsdorf
11:00	Hirner 17' (o.g.); Außenegg (yellow card) 44'; Nowotny (yellow card) 86'; Bolland (yellow card) 108'	Report	Ostermann 7' (pen.); Schellnegger (yellow card) 38'; Koca (yellow card) 59'; Stenzel (yellow card) 85'; Puster (yellow card) 101'	Stadium: Aulandstadion; Attendance: 300; Referee: Markus Greinecker
	Penalties
	Lovric (penalty scored); Nowotny (penalty scored); Özdogan (penalty scored); Tompte (penalty missed); Suday (penalty scored)		(penalty missed) Stenzel; (penalty scored) Mohr; (penalty scored) Gabbichler; (penalty missed) Ostermann

21 July 2023	SC-ESV Parndorf (IV)	0–5	ASV Draßburg (III)	Parndorf
11:30	Chribik (yellow card) 24'; Haider (yellow card) 56'	Report	Muratcehajic 6'; Meier 39'; Schimandl 57' (pen.); Sabadoš 80'; Nikolić 87'	Stadium: Heidebodenstadion; Attendance: 550; Referee: Manuel Baumann

21 July 2023	TWL Elektra (III)	0–3	SKN St. Pölten (II)	Vienna
11:30		Report	Monzialo (yellow card) 62'; Gschwidl 76', 82'; Riegler (yellow card) 78'; Dombaxi 86'	Stadium: Sportplatz Rax; Attendance: 700; Referee: Jakob Semler

22 July 2023	FavAC (III)	2–3	TSV Egger Glas Hartberg (I)	Vienna
08:30	Mandalovic 82'; Khodadadzada 84'	Report	Entrup 43', 59'; Komposch 78'	Stadium: FavAC-Platzv; Attendance: 2,480; Referee: Markus Hameter

22 July 2023	Meusburger FC Wolfurt (III)	0–1	SV Austria Salzburg (II)	Wolfurt
08:30	Özdemir (yellow card) 10'; Kalkan (yellow card) 84'	Report	Alterdinger 22'	Stadium: Sportplatz Wolfurt; Attendance: 600; Referee: Stjepan Bosnjak

22 July 2023	SVG Reichenau (III)	0–2	FC Mohren Dornbirn 1913 (II)	Innsbruck
08:30	Kleinlercher (yellow card) 39'; Wibmer (yellow card) 71'; Caria (yellow card) 90'	Report	Wieser 11'; Mandl (yellow card) 43'; Rodigues 86' (pen.)	Stadium: Kunstrasen Reichenau Hauptspielfeld; Attendance: 300; Referee: Stefan Ebner

22 July 2023	FV Austria XIII Auhof Center (IV)	4–4 (a.e.t.) (3–4 p)	USV St. Anna Am Aigen (III)	Vienna
9:30	Buck 8', 50'; Horschinegg 45+2'; Kelava 51'; Pavlović (yellow card) 76'; Gaugusch (yellow card) 100'	Report	Kobald 4'; Kiedl 45+5', 47' (yellow card) 87'; Weiler 46'; Hajdarevič (yellow card) 65'; Marič (yellow card) 90'; Thurner-Seebacher (yellow card) 90+4'	Stadium: Sportplatz Kinkplatz; Attendance: 250; Referee: Florian Jandl
	Penalties
	Bordian (penalty scored); Donnerbauer (penalty missed); Buck (penalty scored); Tuka (penalty scored); Pavlovic (penalty missed)		(penalty missed) Kobald; (penalty scored) Lackner; (penalty scored) Weiler; (penalty scored) Thurner-Seebacher; (penalty scored) Kiedl

22 July 2023	SAK Klagenfurt (IV)	2–7	Sturm Graz (I)	Klagenfurt
9:30	Kamsek 34'; Sredojevic 82'; Orgis-Martic (yellow card) 85'	Report	Włodarczyk 15', 27', 63'; Kiteishvili 18'; Stanković 51'; Horvat 58'; Jantscher 79'	Stadium: Sportplatz Welzenegg; Attendance: 2,000; Referee: Achim Untergasser

22 July 2023	SPG Silz/Mötz (III)	0–8	SC Austria Lustenau (I)	Mötz
9:30	Durmus (yellow card) 36'; Alak (yellow card) 53'; Heinz (yellow card) 74'	Report	Fridrikas 15' (pen.), 18', 23', 44'; Tiefenbach 23'; Schmid 42'; Cisse 54', 59'	Stadium: Innstadion Mötz; Attendance: 1,000; Referee: Arnse Talic

22 July 2023	SV Leobendorf (III)	3–2 (a.e.t.)	SV Horn (II)	Leobendorf
9:30	Miesenböck 9' (pen.); Sahanek 31'; Bartholomay (yellow card) 95'; Pranjić 100' (pen.)	Report	Ismailcebioglu 52'; Bauer (yellow card) 54'; Hausjell 56'; Hotop (yellow card) 100'	Stadium: Sportplatz Leobendorf; Attendance: 400; Referee: Alexander Harkam

22 July 2023	FC Pinzgau Saalfelden (III)	3–2	Bischofshofen Sportklub 1933 (III)	Saalfelden
10:00	João Pedro 47', 57'; Gvozdjar 49'; Colic (yellow card) 78'; Moosman (yellow card) 86'	Report	Kuksenko 18', (yellow card) 24'; Llambay 27', (yellow card) 63'; Khalil (yellow card) 72', Kahrimanovic (yellow card) 87', Kircher (yellow card) 90+1'	Stadium: Sportanlage Brügerau; Attendance: 390; Referee: Rigger Jakob

22 July 2023	SPG Wallern/St. Mariekirchen (III)	1–5	FC Blau-Weiß Linz (I)	Wallern an der Trattnach
10:30	Dallhamer (yellow card) 17'; Mitter 50'; Straif (red card) 81'	Report	Gölles 32'; Ronivaldo 58'; Mensah 71'; Krainz 82'; Ibrahimi 87'	Stadium: Zaunergroup Waller; Attendance: 1,001; Referee: Kijas Alan

22 July 2023	SV Klöcher Bau Oberwart (III)	1–3	SV Stripfing (II)	Oberwart
10:30	Farkas 90+1'	Report	Pecirep 65'; Haubenwaller 88'; Steiger 90+2'	Stadium: Informstadion; Attendance: 650; Referee: Simsek Isa

22 July 2023	Union Raiffeisen Gurten (III)	1–0	VFB Hohenems (III)	Gurten
10:30	Kreuzer 25'; Schott (yellow card) 78'	Report	Dominguez Mora (yellow card) 11'; Tripp (yellow card) 75'; Schöpf (yellow card) 89'	Stadium: Park21 Arena; Attendance: 400; Referee: Gadler Philipp

22 July 2023	FC Kufstein (III)	0–4	RZ Pellets WAC (I)	Kufstein
11:00	Hager (yellow card) 72' (yellow-red card) 72'	Report	Zimmermann 4'; Baumgartner 34'; Rieder 59', 80'	Stadium: Kufstein Arena; Attendance: 600; Referee: Christopher Jäger

22 July 2023	Bad Gleichenberg (III)	2–4	Grazer AK 1902 (II)	Bad Gleichenberg
12:30	Gantschnig 2' (o.g.); S. Hamm (yellow card) 54'; Krenn (yellow card) 58'; Schleich (yellow card) 72', (goal) 80'; Kohlfürst (yellow card) 84'	Report	Rosenberger 11'; Maderner 33'; Lang 40'; Cheukoua (yellow card) 53'; Jager (yellow card) 57'; Lichtenberger 80'	Stadium: Bad Gleichenberg Arena; Attendance: 1,000; Referee: Harald Lechner

22 July 2023	Kremser SC (III)	2–3	SKU Ertl Glas Amstetten (II)	Krems
12:30	Ambichl (yellow card) 51'; Mehmedovic (yellow card) 71'; Temper 77', 88'; Felber (yellow card) 90+5'	Report	Weixelbraun 24'; Thomas Mayer 45+1'; Offenthaler (yellow card) 57'; Yılmaz (yellow card) 64'; Sulzner (yellow card) 75'; Breuer 88'; Kurt (yellow card) 90+1'	Stadium: Sepp-Doll-Stadion; Attendance: 2,050; Referee: Spurny Josef

22 July 2023	SK Vorwärts Steyr (III)	0–3	SK Austria Klagenfurt (I)	Steyr
12:30	Ziric (yellow card) 41'; Martic (yellow card) 44'; Sulejmanović (yellow card) 90'	Report	Arweiler 23'; Karweina 63'; Mahrer 71', (yellow card) 85'	Stadium: Vorwärts Stadium; Attendance: 1,000; Referee: Pfister Daniel

22 July 2023	SPG WSC Hogo Hertha / FC Wels (III)	1–3	SV Guntamatic Ried (II)	Wels
12:30	Schwaighofer (yellow card) 28'; Mares (yellow card) 50'; Huber (yellow card) 67'; Plojer (yellow card) 90+2'; Zümrüt 16' (pen.)	Report	Havenaar (yellow card) 29'; Wohlmut (yellow card) 79'; Schendl (yellow card) 80'; Marinšek 71' (pen.); Lutovac 72', (yellow card) 86'; J. Diomandé 90+7'	Stadium: HOGO Arena; Attendance: 2,028; Referee: Gerhard Grobelnik

23 July 2023	ASK Klagenfurt (III)	2–4 (a.e.t.)	FC Flyeralarm Admira (II)	Klagenfurt
2:30	B. Romaniuk (yellow card) 21'; Kmetič 30'; Osmić 67', (yellow card) 92'; K. Romaniuk (yellow card) 90+3'; Dierke (yellow card) 110'; Mrsic (yellow card) 116'	Report	Vorsager (yellow card) 25'; Murgaš 67'; Malicsek 88'; Tranziska 104' (pen.), (yellow card) 116'; Puczka 111'	Stadium: ASK-Sportanlage Fischl; Attendance: 500; Referee: Schicher Dominik

23 July 2023	SG Ardagger / Viehdorf (III)	0–6	FC Red Bull Salzburg (I)	Ardagger
3:00		Report	Konaté 10', 35'; Dedić 45'; Kjærgaard 52'; Solet (yellow card) 61'; Kameri 65'; Kaltenbrunner 85' (o.g.)	Stadium: Sportplatz Addager; Attendance: 2,500; Referee: Ristoskov Emil

23 July 2023	SV Haitzendorf (IV)	1–3	FAC Wien (II)	Hatzendorf
9:00	Koppensteiner (yellow card) 32'; Wallner (yellow card) 78'; Vittner 70'	Report	Maier 7'; Bubalovic (yellow card) 29'; Becirovic (yellow card) 36'; T. Günes 80'; Smrcka 90+5'	Stadium: Sportanlage Haitzendorf; Attendance: 700; Referee: Sampl Samuel

23 July 2023	Ferlach ATUS (IV)	0–1	DSV Leoben (II)	Ferlach
9:30	Jaklitsch (yellow card) 21'; Canduzzi (yellow card) 24'; Schwarz (yellow card) 36'; A. Wei (yellow card) 60'; Hobel (yellow card) 87'	Report	Hirschhofer 13'; Pichler (yellow card) 58'	Stadium: Sportplatz Ferlach; Attendance: 400; Referee: Koscielnicki Patrick

23 July 2023	SR Donaufeld (III)	0–7	SK Rapid Wien (I)	Wien
9:45	Ekinci (yellow card) 18'	Report	Burgstaller 6'; Moormann 28'; Grüll 45', 72'; Mayulu 80'; Strunz 85'; Kerschbaum 89'; Seidl 90'	Stadium: Sportplatz Donaufeld; Attendance: 4,500; Referee: Barmaksiz Safak

== Second round ==
Sixteen second round matches were played between 26 and 27 September 2023. The draw was held on Sunday, 30 July 2023 by ORF former football player Stefan Maierhofer.

Number of teams per tier still in competition
Bundesliga (I)	2. League (II)	Regionalliga (III)	Landesliga (IV)	Total
12 / 12	12 / 14	8 / 27	0 / 11	32 / 64

26 September 2023	DSV Leoben (II)	3–1	WSG Tirol (I)	Leoben
11:00 CET	Friesenbichler 20' (pen.); Alar 22', 48', (yellow card) 73'; Pecnik (yellow card) 86'; Heinrich (yellow card) 86'; Wiegele (yellow card) 90+1'	Report	Prelec 53'; Stumberger (yellow card) 83'; Taferner (yellow card) 90+2'	Stadium: Donawitz Stadium; Attendance: 1,480; Referee: Greinecker Markus

26 September 2023	FC Mohren Dornbirn 1913 (II)	2–3 (a.e.t.)	SKN St. Pölten (II)	Dornbirn
11:00 CET	Ramon Andrade 57', 90'; Willian Rodrigues (yellow card) 99'; Marte (yellow card) 103'	Report	Keiblinger (yellow card) 33'; Barlov 64', (yellow card) 105+1'; Scheidegger (yellow card) 71'; Scharner 74'; Monzialo 94'; Pogagetz (yellow card) 107'	Stadium: Stadion Birkenwiese; Attendance: 600; Referee: Pfister Daniel

26 September 2023	First Vienna FC (II)	2–3	SC Austria Lustenau (I)	Vienna
11:00 CET	Luxbacher 51', (yellow card) 78'; Zellhofer (yellow card) 61'; Omerovic (yellow card) 62'; Phillip Ochs 72'; Klissenbauer (yellow card) 75'	Report	Tiefenbach (yellow card) 9'; Frederiksen 6', 20'; T. Rhein 64' (pen.); Gmeiner (yellow card) 78'	Stadium: Hohe Warte Stadion; Attendance: 1,400; Referee: Ciochirca Christian-Petru

26 September 2023	Grazer AK 1902 (II)	2–1	SV Stripfing (II)	Graz
11:00 CET	Jovičić 12', 45+1', (yellow card) 22'; Eloshvili (yellow card) 13'; Murg (yellow card) 30'; Köchl (yellow card) 67'; Lang (yellow card) 90+3'	Report	Güclü (yellow card) 35'; Kreiker (yellow card) 42'; Rakowitz 48'; Gartner (yellow card) 90+1'; Papadimitrou (yellow card) 90+3'	Stadium: Merkur Arena; Attendance: 1,632; Referee: Leitner Florian

26 September 2023	Kapfenberger SV (II)	1–0	SV Licht-Loidl Lafnitz (II)	Kapfenberg
11:00 CET	Mursa 15'; Seidl (yellow card) 45+1'; Duric (yellow card) 90+3'; F. Hoxha (yellow card) 90+5'	Report	Mihaljevic (yellow card) 50'; Cory Sene (yellow card) 60'; Trogancic (yellow card) 70'	Stadium: Franz Fekete Stadium; Attendance: 400; Referee: Barmaksiz Safak

26 September 2023	SV Guntamatic Ried (II)	1–2	RZ Pellets WAC (I)	Ried im Innkreis
11:00 CET	Havenaar (yellow card) 57'; Bumberger 76'	Report	Bamba 43', 72'; Kennedy (yellow card) 75'	Stadium: Josko Arena; Attendance: 2,000

26 September 2023	SV Austria Salzburg (III)	0–4	FC Red Bull Salzburg (I)	Salzburg
12:45 CET	L. Sandmayr (yellow card) 39'; Schwaighofer (yellow card) 77'; Theiner (yellow card) 77'; Zia (yellow card) 87'; Hausberger (yellow card) 87'	Report	Dedić 8'; Forson 64', 72'; Pavlović 83'; Capaldo (yellow card) 87'	Stadium: Sportzentrum ASKÖ Salzburg West; Attendance: 4,101; Referee: Kijas Alan

27 September 2023	ASV Draßburg (III)	0–2	FC Blau-Weiß Linz (I)	Draßburg
10:30 CET	Lemut (yellow card) 56'	Report	Krainz (yellow card) 55'; Feiertag 56'; Pasic (yellow card) 71'; Ronivaldo 78'	Stadium: Sportanlage Draßburg; Attendance: 1,000

27 September 2023	FC Marchfeld Donauauen (III)	2–3	SK Austria Klagenfurt (I)	Mannsdorf
10:30 CET	Nowotny (yellow card) 4'; Meister 6', 80'	Report	Irving 4' (pen.); Nowotny 23' (o.g.); Wernitzig (yellow card) 57'; Karweina 76'; Djoric (yellow card) 76'; Wimmer (yellow card) 82'	Stadium: Aulandstadion; Attendance: 300; Referee: Sampl Samuel

27 September 2023	SC Imst (III)	0–3	LASK (I)	Imst
10:30 CET	Jovljevic (yellow card) 25'; Lamp (yellow card) 56'	Report	Luckeneder 8'; Usor (yellow card) 56'; Goiginger 71' (o.g.); S. Ba 85'	Stadium: Velly Arena Imst; Attendance: 1,500; Referee: Rigger Jakob

27 September 2023	USV St. Anna am Aigen (III)	0–4	FK Austria Wien (I)	Sankt Anna am Aigen
10:30 CET	Weber (yellow card) 67'	Report	Gruber 31'; Fischer 67'; Fitz 78'; Ranftl 90+1'	Stadium: Stahlbau Müller Arena; Attendance: 1,752; Referee: Ristoskov Emil

28 September 2023	FC Pinzgau Saalfelden (III)	0–2	Cashpoint SCR Altach (I)	Saalfelden
11:00 CET	Colic (yellow card) 54'; Koller (yellow card) 66'	Report	Abdijanovic 35'; Nuhiu 38'	Stadium: Sportanlage Brügerau; Attendance: 570; Referee: Untergasser Achim

28 September 2023	SKU Ert Glas Amstetten (II)	1–0 (a.e.t.)	Floridsdorfer AC (II)	Amstetten
11:00 CET	Yılmaz (yellow card) 66'; Stark (yellow card) 90+4'; Marco Sulzner (yellow card) 110'; Monsberger 113'	Report	Scherzadeh (yellow card) 85'; Bubalović (yellow card) 97'	Stadium: Union-Platz; Attendance: 500; Referee: Semler Jakob

28 September 2023	SV Leobendorf (III)	0–3	Sturm Graz (I)	Leobendorf
11:00 CET	Hofer (yellow card) 37'; Lazarevic (yellow card) 56'; Laschet (yellow card) 68'; Schwaiger (yellow card) 85'	Report	Bøving 43'; Hierländer (yellow card) 60'; Prass 71'; Affengruber 89'	Stadium: Franz Haas Stadion; Attendance: 1,500; Referee: Dominic Schilcher

28 September 2023	FC Flyeralarm Admira (II)	0–1 (a.e.t.)	TSV Egger Glas Hartberg (I)	Maria Enzersdorf
11:30 CET	Malicsek (yellow card) 79'; Keckeisen (yellow card) 108'; Gruber (yellow card) 108'; Gashi (yellow card) 120'	Report	Kainz (yellow card) 70' (goal) 103'; Schopp (red card) 117'	Stadium: Motion invest Arena; Attendance: 798; Referee: Julien Weinberger

28 September 2023	Union Raiffeisen Gurten (III)	2–5 (a.e.t.)	SK Rapid Wien (I)	Gurten
12:30 CET	Kreuzer 37'; Wimmleitner 76'; Schott (yellow card) 76'	Report	Strunz 18'; Kasanwirjo (yellow card) 79'; Seidl 82'; Grüll 96'; Mayulu 102', 108'	Stadium: Park21 Arena; Attendance: 5,000; Referee: Oliver Fluch

== Third round ==
Eight third round matches were played. The draw was held on Sunday, 1 October 2023 by ex-Austria Captain Markus Suttner.

Number of teams per tier still in competition
Bundesliga (I)	2. League (II)	Regionalliga (III)	Landesliga (IV)	Total
11 / 12	5 / 14	0 / 27	0 / 11	16 / 64

31 October 2023	DSV Leoben (II)	1–1 (a.e.t.) (5–4 p)	RZ Pellets WAC (I)	Leoben
12:00 CET	Alar 56'; Friesenbichler (penalty missed) 71'; Weberbauer (yellow card) 90'; Untergrabner (yellow card) 118'	Report	Ballo; Baumgartner (yellow card) 52'; Leitgeb (yellow card) 58'; Zimmerman (yellow card) 95'	Stadium: Monte Schlacko Arena; Attendance: 2,200; Referee: Julian Weinberger
	Penalties
	Hirschhofer (penalty scored); Horvat (penalty missed); Heinrich (penalty scored); Untergrabner (penalty scored); Alar (penalty missed); Friesenbichler (penalty scored); Maier (penalty scored)		(penalty missed) Zimmerman; (penalty scored) Jašić; (penalty missed) Omić; (penalty scored) Ibertsberger; (penalty scored) Bamba; (penalty scored) Baumgartner; (penalty missed) Piesinger

1 November 2023	SKN St. Pölten (II)	4–0	SC Austria Lustenau (I)	Sankt Pölten
11:00 CET	Barlov 19' (Dombaxi), 43'; Monzialo 25'; Grujcic 55' (o.g.); Wisak (yellow card) 84'	Report	Cisse (penalty missed) 55'	Stadium: NV Arena; Attendance: 1,519; Referee: Jakob Semler

1 November 2023	FK Austria Wien (I)	1–0	SK Austria Klagenfurt (I)	Vienna
12:00 CET	Asllani 24' (Potzmann); Jukic (yellow card) 51'; Gruber (yellow card) 60'; Holland (yellow card) 90+4'	Report	Gemicibaşi (yellow card) 27'; Benatelli (yellow card) 29'; Wernitznig (yellow card) 45+1'	Stadium: Viola Park; Attendance: 11,223; Referee: Christopher Jäger

1 November 2023	Kapfenberger SV (II)	0–0 (5–6 p)	LASK (I)	Kapfenberg
12:00 CET	Miskovic (yellow card) 31'; Zikic (yellow card) 44'; N'Zi (yellow card) 74'; Walchhütter (yellow card) 107'	Report	Luckeneder (yellow card) 72'; Stojković (yellow card) 77'; Koné (yellow card) 120'	Stadium: Franz Fekete Stadium; Attendance: 2,400; Referee: Arnse Talic
	Penalties
	Pichorner (penalty scored); Szerencsi (penalty scored); Lucho (penalty scored); Murza (penalty scored); Seidl (penalty scored); Walchhütter (penalty missed)		(penalty scored) Michorl; (penalty scored) Koné; (penalty scored) Andrade; (penalty scored) Talovyerov; (penalty scored) Usor; (penalty scored) Pintor

1 November 2023	TSV Egger Glas Hartberg (I)	1–1 (4–5 p)	FC Red Bull Salzburg (I)	Hartberg
12:00 CET	Sangare (yellow card) 3'; Entrup 67' (Komposch); Halwachs (yellow card) 106'	Report	Sučić (yellow card) 57'; Kjærgaard (yellow card) 68'; Ratkov 77' (Ulmer); Dedić (yellow card) 90+3'; Capaldo (yellow card) 90+3'	Stadium: Profertil Arena Hartberg; Attendance: 2,900; Referee: Walter Altmann
	Penalties
	Frieser (penalty scored); Sallinger (penalty scored); Kainz (penalty scored); Entrup (penalty scored); Avdijaj (penalty missed)		(penalty scored) Šimić; (penalty scored) Ratkov; (penalty scored) Dedić; (penalty scored) Pavlović; (penalty scored) Solet

1 November 2023	SKU Ert Glas Amstetten (II)	1–5	SK Rapid Wien (I)	Amstetten
14:30 CET	Starkl 64' (Monsberger); Yilmaz (yellow card) 73'	Report	Grüll 30' (pen.), 57' (Kühn); Kühn 39' (Grüll); Kerschbaum 54' (Moormann) (yellow card) 70'; Moormann (yellow card) 81'; Mayulu 85' (Kerschbaum)	Stadium: Ertl-Glas-Stadion; Attendance: 2,620; Referee: Alexander Harkam

2 November 2023	Cashpoint SCR Altach (I)	2–0	FC Blau-Weiß Linz (I)	Altach
12:00 CET	Gugganig 33' (Fadinger) (yellow card) 90+3'; Reiter 73' (Nuhiu); Ingolitsch (yellow card) 82'	Report	Strauss (yellow card) 38'; Haudum (yellow card) 56'	Stadium: CASHPOINT Arena; Attendance: 2,549; Referee: Sebastian Gishamer

2 November 2023	Grazer AK 1902 (II)	2–3	Sturm Graz (I)	Graz
14:30 CET	Jovičić (yellow card) 20'; Cheukoua 30' (Lichtenberger) (yellow card) 90+3'; Oberleitner 37' (Cheukoua); Gantschnig (yellow card) 48'	Report	Wüthrich 5' (Gazibegović) (yellow card) 29'; Prass (yellow card) 34'; Oberleitner 58' (o.g.); Teixeira 84' (Sakaria)	Stadium: Merkur-Arena; Attendance: 16,500; Referee: Harald Lechner

== Quarter-finals ==
Four quarter-final matches were played. The draw was held as part of the ORF broadcast, Fußball.

Number of teams per tier still in competition
Bundesliga (I)	2. League (II)	Regionalliga (III)	Landesliga (IV)	Total
6 / 12	2 / 14	0 / 27	0 / 11	8 / 64

2 February 2024	LASK (I)	2–3	FC Red Bull Salzburg (I)	Linz
16:00 CET	Ljubičić 18'; Usor (yellow card) 60'; Žulj (yellow card) 78'; Flecker (yellow card) 90'; Horvath 90+4' (Žulj)	Report	Gourna-Douath 15' (yellow card) 81'; Fernando (yellow card) 8' (goal) 28' (Kjærgaard), 51' (Gloukh); Gloukh (yellow card) 85'	Stadium: Raiffeisen Arena; Attendance: 14,700; Referee: Julian Weinberger

2 February 2024	Sturm Graz (I)	2–0	FK Austria Wien (I)	Graz
16:00 CET	Horvat 9'; Biereth 45+8'	Report	Fischer (yellow card) 90+2'	Stadium: Merkur Arena; Attendance: 12,025; Referee: Christopher Jäger

3 February 2024	DSV Leoben (II)	2–1	Cashpoint SCR Altach (I)	Leoben
16:00 CET	Alar 10' (Turi), 88' (Hepburn); Untergrabner (yellow card) 47'; Horvat (yellow card) 47'	Report	Reiner 25' (Fadinger); Jäger (yellow card) 28'	Stadium: Monte Schlacko Arena; Attendance: 3,450; Referee: Josef Spurny

4 February 2024	SK Rapid Wien (I)	3–1	SKN St. Pölten (II)	Vienna
15:10 CET	Grüll 35' (pen.); Ramsebner 77' (o.g.); Seidl 90+4' (Kasanwirjo)	Report	Nutz 11' (pen.)	Stadium: Allianz Stadion; Attendance: 15,200; Referee: Alexander Harkam

== Semi-finals ==
Two semi-final matches were played. The draw was held on 11 February 2024.

Number of teams per tier still in competition
Bundesliga (I)	2. League (II)	Regionalliga (III)	Landesliga (IV)	Total
3 / 12	1 / 14	0 / 27	0 / 11	4 / 64

3 April 2024	DSV Leoben (II)	0–3	SK Rapid Wien (I)	Leoben
20:45 CET	Eskinja (yellow card) 52'; Pichler (yellow card) 72'	Report	Burgstaller 26' (Seidl); Lang 41'; Seidl (yellow card) 84'; Mayulu 90+1' (Grüll)	Stadium: Monte Schlacko Arena; Attendance: 8,450; Referee: Markus Hameter

4 April 2024	FC Red Bull Salzburg (I)	3–4	Sturm Graz (I)	Wals-Siezenheim
20:45 CET	Solet 11' (Daniliuc); Ratkov (yellow card) 41'; Sučić; Terzić 90' (Sučić); Koïta (yellow card) 90+3'	Report	Bøving 25' (Horvat); Horvat 52' (Gazibegović); Wüthrich (yellow card) 66'; Schnegg 71' (Biereth); Geyrhofer (yellow card) 77' (goal) 81' (Horvat)	Stadium: Red Bull Arena; Attendance: 11,494; Referee: Walter Altmann

== Final ==
The final was played on 1 May 2024 between the two semi-final winners.

Number of teams per tier still in competition
Bundesliga (I)	2. League (II)	Regionalliga (III)	Landesliga (IV)	Total
2 / 12	0 / 14	0 / 27	0 / 11	2 / 64

1 May 2024
15:00 CET

Sturm Graz	2–1	SK Rapid Wien
Querfeld 49' (o.g.); Horvat 81'	Report	Seidl 43'

Wörthersee Stadion, Klagenfurt am Wörthersee
Attendance: 30,000
Referee: Sebastian Gishamer

== Top goalscorers ==
Updated 3 April 2024

Rank	Player	Club	Goals
1	(Austria) Marco Grüll	SK Rapid Wien	6
2	(Austria) Deni Alar	DSV Leoben	5
2	(France) Fally Mayulu	SK Rapid Wien	5
4	(Austria) Lukas Fridrikas	Austria Lustenau	4
5	(Poland) Szymon Włodarczyk	Sturm Graz	3
5	(Austria) Manfred Fischer	FK Austria Wien	3
5	(Austria) Thomas Hirschhofer	DSV Leoben	3
5	(Austria) Maximilian Entrup	TSV Hartberg	3
5	(Austria) Din Barlov	SKN St. Pölten	3
5	(Austria) Matthias Seidl	SK Rapid Wien	3

== See also ==
- 2023–24 Austrian Football Bundesliga
- 2023–24 Austrian Football Second League
