= Ngomongo Villages =

Eco-cultural tourist village in Mombasa, Kenya

Coordinates: 3°57′55″S 39°44′54″E

Ngomongo Villages is a well-known sustainable eco-cultural tourist village in Mombasa, Kenya. It is situated in a former coral limestone quarry, and the aim of its rehabilitation was to convert it into a sustainable development, while turning it into hospitable land with utility to community, while eliminating its hazards and improving the ecosystem.

The legacy of the former mine was a sun baked, arid, barren and rocky base, the floor of which was barely 150 cm (4.9 ft) above the somewhat salty water table. Frederick Gikandi, a local medical doctor started single-handedly to reclaim the quarry by planting 16,000 m^{2} (4 acres) of eighty different indigenous trees; casuarina trees later followed which were easier to cultivate. Public awareness to tree planting was raised by inviting the public to join in the reclamation process.

== Reclamation of quarry site ==
In 1991 the neglected wasteland of Ngomongo quarry was a vast urban eyesore of some 65,000 m^{2} (16 acres), and a hazard to its neighbours as it acted as a retreat for robbers. Inspired by a previously successful project, namely Haller Park initiated by Dr. Rene Haller in Bamburi Beach, Dr. Gikandi applied Haller's approach to rehabilitate the barren substrate.

At around this time, the Mombasa municipal council had earmarked the quarry as the municipal refuse dumping site. If carried out this would have contaminated the water table which lies only about 150 cm (4.9 ft) below the quarry floor, and by extension the Indian Ocean coastal and marine ecosystem. The built up surrounding urban neighbourhood would have suffered air pollution from the decomposing dumped municipal refuse.

Once reclamation work had started, he then involved individuals and the community in tree planting. This was later followed by incorporation of cultural tourism to ensure sustainability.

== Geography and climate ==
It is about 600 m to 700 m inland from the coast. The quarry floor lies about 150 cm (4.9 ft) above the water table, which interconnects with the seabed as is evident from the quarry well water level fluctuations that are coincidental with the ocean tides.

It is excavated up to a depth of 12 m and is in the coastal and marine tropical climate. Rain falls every month although not reliably, much of the rain falling during the April to June period. Average annual rainfall is about 1,192 mm with a maximum of over 2,056 mm. The number of rain days varies from 85 to 130 except for a marked increase in 1997 due to the El Niño weather conditions. The mean temperature is about 28.8 °C in July and August. Average humidity varies too, with the lowest readings of 65% usually in February and 85% in May.

The coastal region around Mombasa has two monsoon currents: the south east monsoon from May to the beginning of October and the northeast from November to March.

== Milestones overcome ==
=== Quarry rehabilitation project ===
Corals usually live in colonies. Each single animal excretes a skeleton of calcium carbonate, which cements with neighbor cell excretions, eventually forming a whole colonial buildup of compacted constructions, which extend over wide areas. Corals don't thrive in temperature below 20 °C and depend on shallow seas for growth. Once the living corals get dry from shifting sea levels, the whole coral structure dies and is then known as coral limestone rock. It is at this stage that man can excavate coral limestone for construction works.

The arid and desolate Ngomongo quarry pit, had been excavated to 12 m but was not conducive to plant growth, and had no hope of being spontaneously inhabited by trees for another decade.

The aim of the quarry rehabilitation was therefore to turn it into good hospitable land, with high utility to the people around, improving the ecosystem, reducing its various hazards, and converting it into a sustainable development.

The total dissolved solid and the salinity of the ground water were studied for planning purposes.

=== Casuarina project ===
Tree seedlings from government forest stations were purchased and transferred to the quarry. The quarry's own small seed bank which was established later with the help of the community around the quarry, provided seeds to set up a tree nursery. Planted one meter apart initially, the casuarina were later thinned to two metres apart.

The casuarina did very well and helped in breaking up the coral rock with their carpet like root system. Currently the casuarina trees are of average height of 10 m and above provide a very good tree cover and shade for the quarry floor.

The dropping foliage of these trees is broken down by micro–organism and other small organisms like the millipede. The original millipede population was collected by hand by the neighbourhood community and introduced in large numbers into the quarry. Millipedes feed on the fallen leaves (needles) breaking them down to release nutrients.

The forest leaf cover composted, adding more humus to the ground, as the number of millipedes increased in this their promised land. Millipedes can reach up to a length of 12 cm, hide under the leaf foliage during the dry season, reappearing in large numbers during the rainy season.

== Tree species ==
The casuarinas are famous for their prestigious timber, which is used in the construction industry. The Neem tree is also doing very well, so are the Baobab tree, coconut, mango trees and the date palms, “mvuli”, sausage-tree (“muratina”) and others. The Neem tree (“mwarobaini”) is believed to be able to cure 40 diseases hence the name “mwarobaini”. “Akamba” carvers use the logs for carving wood sculptures. Its bark and leaves are used for treating fevers such as due to malaria and other ailments. The leaves yield a non–synthetic insecticide. The small branches are used as disposable toothbrushes The powdered bark of the tree is used for protection of maize granaries against weevils. The “Muratina” tree spongy fruit is the traditional ‘yeast” for brewing traditional Muratina brew for the “Kikuyu” and the “Akamba” ( this can be sipped and tasted at the Akamba village of Ngomongo villages) “Mvuli” is a sought for hard wood originally from Tanzania. It is the best oak tree equivalent for furniture in East Africa.

== Plants and insects ==
Ferns, mushrooms and other plants which require tree cover and a lot of humus started appearing after just a few years in the forest. At first only a few species were found flourishing but more species are now appearing, some on branches, trunks of dead wood and on the rock cliff faces. Leaf shedding ants are useful in cutting leaves into small pieces. The ants work day and night. Their leaf shredding habit and their fungal cultivation are beneficial to the forest. These types of ants are many, an example being the weaver ants. The termites are also in large numbers in our forest. The termites feed on soft timber trunks, thus they are usually considered as pests, but they play a great role in reducing the dead wood in forests to humus.

== Wetlands ==
Natural ponds were dug by an improvised homegrown shovel. The shovel was made from an empty steel water storage tank whose shoveling edge on the tank top was reinforced with a sharpened pickup main leaf spring, welded onto this edge.

With two men sitting on the plough or shovel to give it weight and anchorage, the donkeys would drag the plough or shovel. This would be repeated many times until the lake was at least one meter deep below the water table. The depth of the three ponds is an average of one meter.

Crocodiles were introduced into one of the ponds that represent Lake Turkana (of northern Kenya) in the village theme. The other pond represents in the village theme, Lake Victoria, which is in western Kenya. Tilapia were introduced into this lake.

Large flocks of birds nest on and feed on these wetlands. These including kingfishers, weaver birds, Egyptian geese and others.

=== The bird sanctuary ===
Within the quarry, a 8,100 m^{2} (2 acres) bird sanctuary has local chicken, ostriches, geese and cranes. The daily feeding of birds at the bird sanctuary has attracted many wild birds like Egyptian geese. These wild birds have established their breeding sites on the quarry rock outcrops and most of them have made the quarry their home. There are now over 50 species of birds in the entire quarry. The birds help in seed dispersal as they feed on wild fruits and drop their droppings on other parts of the forest.

== Farm gardens ==
The quarry now has ten diverse rural Kenya villages, each with a niche of forest, displaying his true "culture" and "rural home replica".

Among the things they display are huts, utensils, gardens and the crops they grow in their rural areas. The gardens were made by clearing patches of the new forest. Loosening the coral, then putting 10 cm (4 in) of soil and manure cover on which various unique crops are being cultivated. (See FAUNA above).
