= Bamburi Cement =

Kenyan manufacturing company

Bamburi Cement Limited
- Type: Public; KN: BAMB
- Industry: Construction
- Founded: 1951
- Founder: Felix Mandl
- Headquarters: Nairobi, Kenya
- Key people: John Simba (chairman of the board); Seddiq Hassani (managing director)
- Products: Cement and concrete
- Revenue: ▲KES: 39.2 billion (2015)
- Net income: ▲KES: 5.87 billion (2015)
- Total assets: ▲KES: 42 billion (2015)
- Total equity: ▲KES: 29.7 billion (2015)
- Number of employees: 851
- Website: Homepage

Bamburi Cement Limited is an industrial company in Kenya specialising in cement and concrete. The company has operations in Bamburi suburb of Mombasa, it is headquartered in Nairobil It was previously listed on the Nairobi Securities Exchange, until it was acquired by Amson Industries in 2024.

== Overview ==
Bamburi Cement is the largest manufacturer of cement in Eastern Africa, with its cement plant in Mombasa being the second largest cement plant in sub-Saharan Africa. This has given it the title of largest manufacturing export earner in Kenya. As of December 2015, the company's total assets were valued at US$420 million, with shareholders' equity of about US$297 million.

== History ==
Bamburi Cement was founded in 1951 by Felix Mandl as a partnership between Cementia Holding and Blue Circle in British Kenya. The company started production from its Mombasa plant in 1954. In 1998, Bamburi opened a clinker grinding plant in Athi River.

== Subsidiaries and investments ==
The companies that comprise Bamburi Cement include, but are not limited, to the following:

- Bamburi Cement – Nairobi, Kenya – The flagship company of the group. This unit engages in the production of cement.
- Bamburi Special Products – Nairobi, Kenya – 100% shareholding – This subsidiary is dedicated to manufacturing of concrete paving blocks and ready mix concrete.
- Lafarge Eco systems – Nairobi, Kenya – 100% shareholding – The environmental and rehabilitation arm of the group.
- HimCem Holdings – Saint Helier, Jersey – 100% shareholding – An investment holding company.
- East African Portland Cement Company – Athi River, Kenya – 12.5% shareholding – A Kenya-based cement manufacturer listed on the NSE.

== Takeover by Amson Industries ==
In July 2024, Amsons Industries (K) Ltd, a Kenyan subsidiary of Tanzania-based Amsons Industries (T) Ltd, announced a cash takeover offer for Bamburi Cement Plc. The offer proposed the acquisition of 100% of Bamburi's issued ordinary shares at KES 65 per share, valuing the transaction at approximately KES 23.6 billion. The offer represented a significant premium to Bamburi's prevailing market price on the Nairobi Securities Exchange.

At the time of the offer, Bamburi had 362,959,275 issued shares. Amsons stated that it intended to acquire all outstanding shares and noted that, should it obtain at least 75% ownership, it would evaluate whether Bamburi should remain listed on the Nairobi Securities Exchange. If ownership reached 90% or more, compulsory acquisition provisions under Kenyan law could be applied.

The transaction received irrevocable undertakings from Bamburi's largest shareholders, Fincem Holding Limited and Kencem Holding Limited, which together controlled approximately 58.6% of the company's share capital. The offer formed part of Amsons' strategy to expand its cement operations in East Africa, complementing its existing cement businesses in Tanzania.

Following completion of the acquisition process, Bamburi Cement became part of the Amsons Group, marking the end of more than 70 years as an independent cement manufacturer in Kenya.

== Shareholding ==
The shares of Bamburi Cement are traded on the main market segment of the Nairobi Securities Exchange, under the ticker symbol: BAMB. The shareholding in the company's stock as at 31 December 2016 was as depicted in the table below:

Bamburi Cement Limited stock ownership
Rank	Name of owner	Percentage ownership
1	Fincem Holding Limited	29.30
2	Kencem Holding Limited	29.30
3	Other investors	41.40
	Total	100.00

Fincem Holding Limited and Kencem Holding Limited are subsidiaries of LafargeHolcim. This gives LafargeHolcim 58.6 percent control of Bamburi Cement.

== Environmental concerns ==
During its early years, cement production grew from 1.2 million tons to 25 million tons. This made the Bamburi quarries inhospitable arid wasteland with brackish water. In 1959, the company engaged Rene Haller to beautify the area. In the 1971 Haller embarked on the reforestation project leading to the formation of Haller Park. The park is tourist attraction with a wide range of flora and fauna.

The company has since aimed to convert barren landscape of disused limestone quarries into vibrant and diverse ecosystem of forest, grasslands and ponds.

== Sponsorship ==
=== Bamburi Rugby Super Series ===
The Bamburi Rugby Super Series is an East African rugby union competition with eight teams in total, five teams from Kenya, two from Uganda and one from Tanzania. It is closely based on the Super Rugby competition in the southern hemisphere. Games take place at the RFUEA Ground in Nairobi, Friedkin Recreation Centre in Arusha and the Kyadondo Grounds, Kampala.

== See also ==
- Cement in Africa
- Haller Park
