= Wilfred Lai =

20th- and 21st-century Kenyan Pastor

Pastor Wilfred Lai
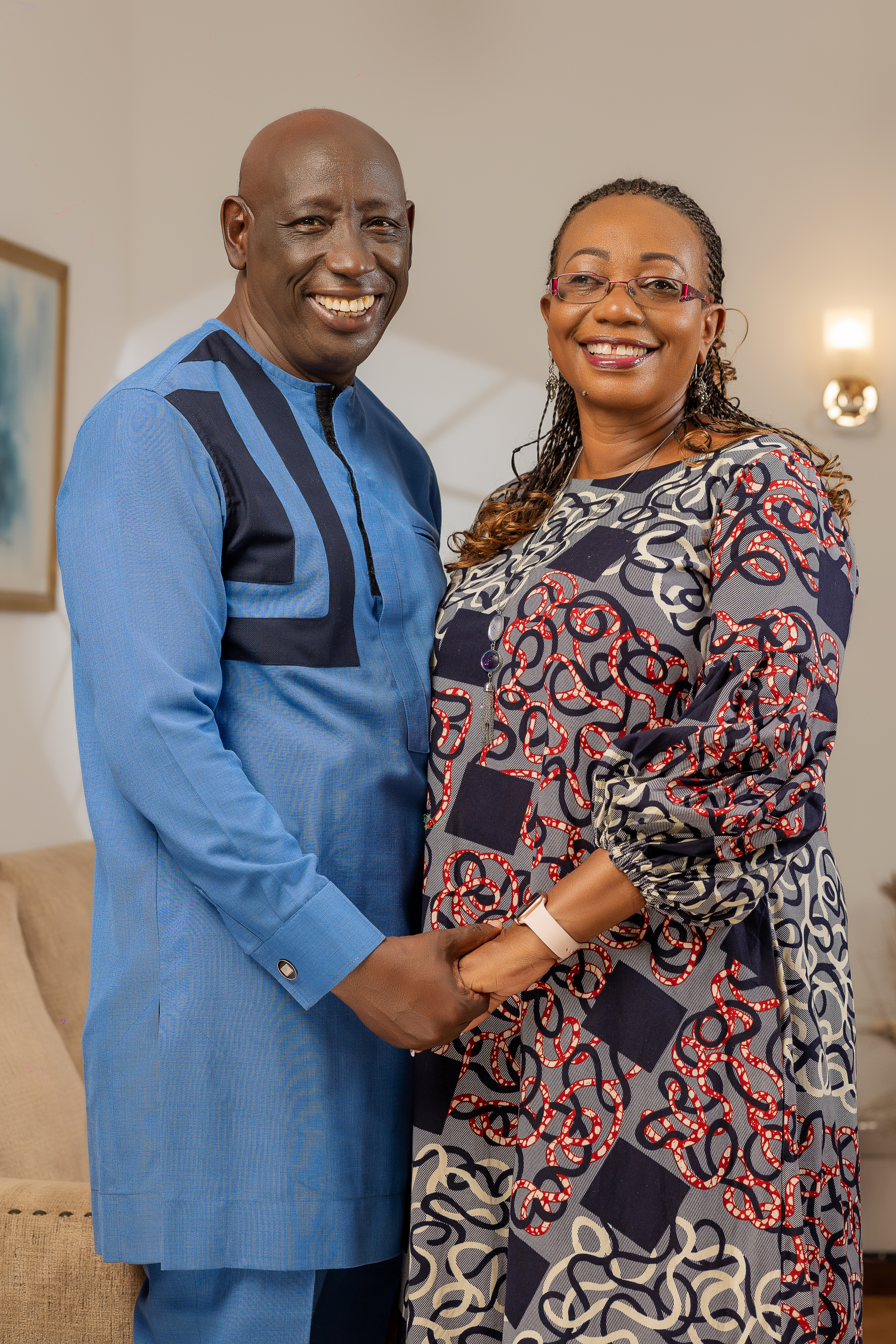
- Pastor Wilfred Lai with his Wife, Rita Lai
- Born: Wilfred Lai; 11 April 1956 (age 69); Machakos, Machakos, Kenya
- Occupation: Lead Pastor
- Spouse: Rita Lai (before 1980)
- Children: David Lai, Daniel Lai
- Religion: Christian
- Congregations served: Jesus Celebration Centre, Mombasa, Kenya
- Title: Pastor

Pastor Dr. Wilfred Lai (born 11 April 1956), commonly known as Papa to his congregation, is a Kenyan Lead Pastor of Jesus Celebration Centre, a Kenyan and international megachurch, whose headquarters is located at Bamburi, in the coastal region of Mombasa, Kenya. Dr. Lai is one of the pioneers of media ministry, having hosted his program on KTN, one of Kenya's mainstream television channels for many years. Pastor Lai's church services and ministry work is broadcast live on Wilfred Lai Ministry.

== Early life in Ministry ==
Pastor Lai was called in the ministry in 1982 when he was working at Standard Chartered Bank in Machakos. He went and joined Life Ministry (Christian Campus for Christ) in Nairobi in 1983 he was then transferred to Mombasa where he was the Director of Coast Province, he was also the assistant pastor of the local Redeemed Gospel Church. In 1986 he became the Senior Pastor and at the same time left Life ministry to concentrate on his new assignment.

== Ministry ==
Pastor Lai has pastored and raised Jesus Celebration Centre, from a humble membership of 60 people, to the current position of more than (10,000) Ten thousand members. The headquarters of the church is in Bamburi, Mombasa, Kenya the sanctuary has a sitting capacity of 30,000 people. His vision is to sit 4 services each Sunday with a total of 120,000 members. JCC ministry's strength is based on five pillars of biblical truths that form the foundational doctrine of our teachings, which are: Prayer, Faith, Giving, fellowship and the Word. JCC Mombasa is one church gathering in four locations which are called centers. His vision is to have 7 centers in the city and for each center to open seven branches around it.

As lead Pastor to the four Centers located within Mombasa and two others, (capital center in Nairobi and Tala center) he makes regular visits doing Revival services to strengthen them and to release the grace that he carries. Every last Sunday of the month in the evening service all the centers and their branch churches gather to connect with the grace. Every three months all JCC centers close and gather for a joint service at the headquarters

== Family ==
Pastor Wilfred Lai is married to Rita Lai. They have two sons, David Lai and Daniel Lai who are also part of the ministry.
