= Shanzu =

Coordinates: 3°58′S 39°45′E

Shanzu is a suburb of Mombasa, Kenya. Shanzu is located in Mombasa, off the Mombasa-Malindi highway. Shanzu Beach has a number of popular hotels, bars and restaurants and is within easy reach of Mombasa, Bamburi, Nyali and Mtwapa. The streets are mostly lined with small scale businesses that are the major economic activity.

Shanzu Teachers college remains the most popular attraction for this suburb.

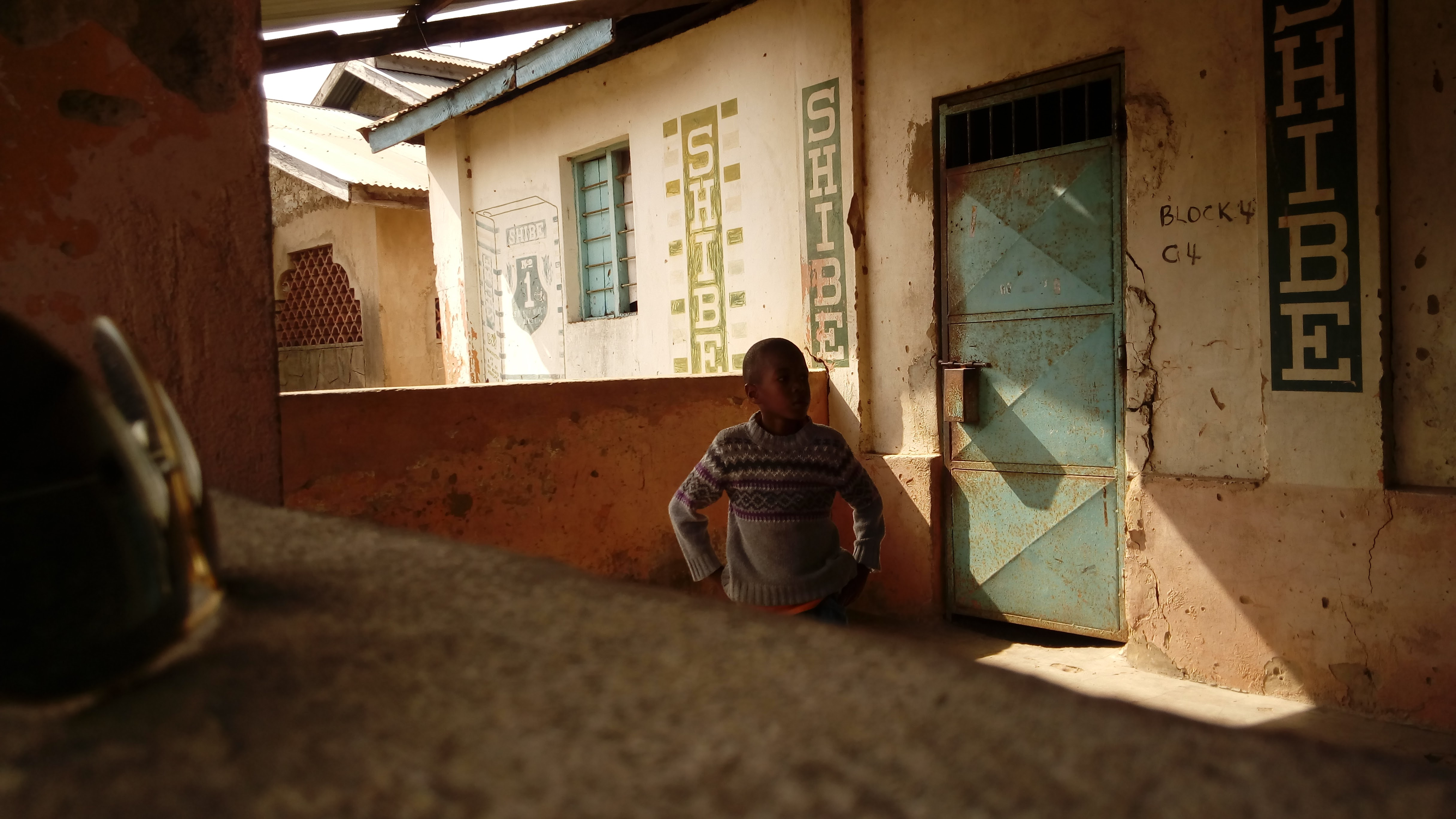
Houses in Shanzu
