= Owen and Mzee =

Hippopotamus and an Aldabra giant tortoise

Owen (left) and Mzee (right)

Owen and Mzee were a hippopotamus and an Aldabra giant tortoise duo, respectively, that attracted media attention after forming an unusual bond of friendship. They lived in Haller Park, Bamburi, Kenya.

Owen was separated from his herd as a juvenile after Sumatra's December 2004 tsunami and was brought to the Haller Park rescue centre. Having no other hippos to interact with, Owen immediately attempted to bond with Mzee (Swahili for a wise old man), whose large domed shell and brown colour resembled an adult hippo. Mzee was initially reluctant about Owen but grew to like him and got used to Owen around him.

Once it was determined that Owen had grown too large to safely interact with Mzee, a separate enclosure was built for Owen and a new (female) hippo named Cleo, with whom he bonded quickly. With Owen now twice Mzee's size and well on his way to being socialized with other hippos, the famous friends went their separate ways and Mzee was returned to his original enclosure.

The pair were featured in Owen and Mzee: The True Story of a Remarkable Friendship, a 2006 book by Isabella and Craig Hatkoff, as well as the 2007 sequel Owen and Mzee: The Language of Friendship. Jeanette Winter also created a picture book about Owen titled Mama: A True Story.

Presented by Vital Theatre and directed by Stanley Wayne Mathis, this story was adapted into an Off-Broadway musical, Owen and Mzee The Musical, by Michelle Elliott (book and lyrics) and Danny Larsen (music and lyrics).

The show premiered in 2018 at the Theater at Blessed Sacrament in Manhattan and featured Eric Willingham as Owen and TJ Bolden as Mzee. It was also written as a screenplay by Roger S. H. Schulman, one of the writers of Shrek, but has yet to be produced.

== See also ==
- List of individual hippopotamids
