= Felix Adjei =

Ghanaian footballer

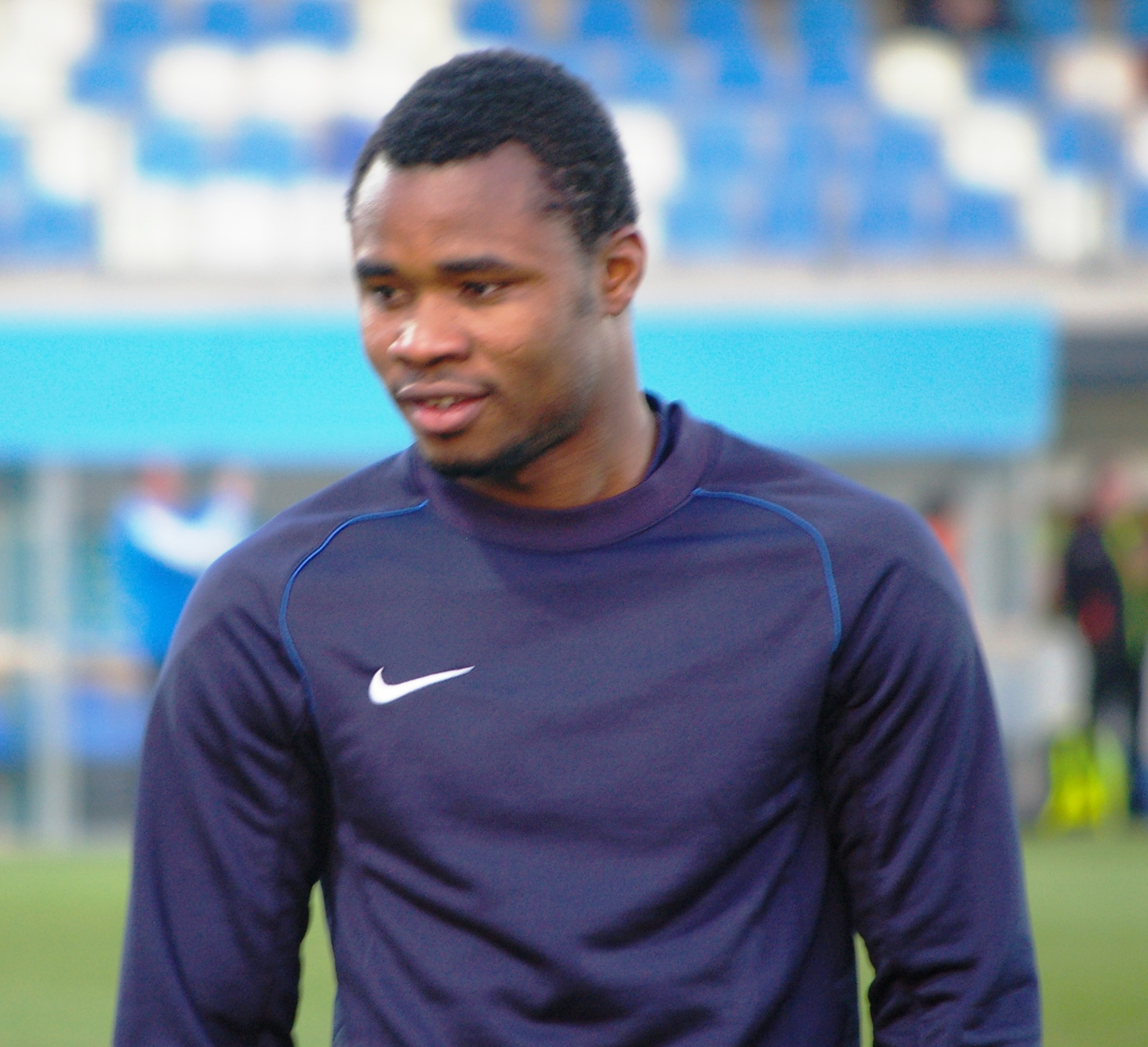
- Adjei with Leifering

Personal information
- Full name: Felix Adjei
- Date of birth: 17 December 1990 (age 35)
- Place of birth: Ghana
- Height: 1.75 m (5 ft 9 in)
- Position: Left midfielder

Team information
- Current team: Pinzgau Saalfelden
- Number: 17

Youth career
- –2010: Red Bull Ghana

Senior career*
Years	Team	Apps	(Gls)
2010–2015	FC Liefering	89	(17)
2011	Red Bull Salzburg	1	(0)
2016–2018	Umeå FC	35	(3)
2018	Wiener Neustadt	10	(0)
2018–2020	WSG Swarovski Tirol	42	(2)
2021–	Pinzgau Saalfelden	123	(8)
- * Club domestic league appearances and goals as of 27 June 2026

Felix Adjei (born 12 December 1990) is a Ghanaian professional footballer who plays as a left midfielder for Austrian side Pinzgau Saalfelden.

Adjei has previously played for FC Liefering, Red Bull Salzburg and Umeå FC.
