= Felix Mandl =

Austrian businessman and entrepreneur

- Born: 16 December 1898; Wien, Austro-Hungarian Monarchy, (now Austria)

Felix Mandl (born 16 December 1898; died 1993) was a Croatian businessman and entrepreneur.

== Early life, background and education ==
Mandl was born in Wien as the fourth child of a wealthy Jewish family. He studied agriculture and philosophy in Göttingen at the University of Göttingen.

== Career ==
Mandl's grandfather founded a cement plant in 1867, which had a branch plant in Podsused, district of Zagreb, Croatia. Later that plant was turned from craft into a corporation with headquarters in Zurich. Mandl was supposed to move to Zurich, but with Adolf Hitler's rise to power, he changed his mind. Plant in Podsused was named "Croatia".

During the World War II he moved to Zagreb from where he guided the plant in Podsused. Soon he became a victim of political regimes. When the Ustashe came to power in Croatia, they began to threaten him with murder because he was a Jew. His plant was taken away from him by NDH regime. Mandl ended up in jail due to listening the BBC radio program, which was banned at the time. He was also arrested by the Gestapo, but was released after five days due to "economic reasons", while other prisoners that were with Mandl in detention were sent to Nazi concentration camps. After the war Mandl was tried by the communist regime of SFR Yugoslavia for alleged collaboration with the fascist government, which was never proven. He was sentenced to ten years of forced labor. Mandl was taken to Lepoglava prison, from which he was released after two years when it was discovered that during the war he helped a Partisan fighters.

In the nationalization by the communist regime, Mandl was left without any factory, except the one in Podsused, which was later renamed to "Sloboda", but was soon afterwards destroyed.

In Kenya in 1951 Mandl founded Bamburi Cement, one of largest cement companies in Sub-Saharan Africa.

== Personal life ==
Mandl was married to Ana Bing from 1931. During World War II he had sent his wife to Budapest, out of a fear that Zagreb was no longer safe for her. Mandl's wife returned to Zagreb after a month, although the threat still existed. While in prison in Lepoglava, Mandl had regularly visits from his wife. On 5 December 1950 Mandl and his wife emigrated to Kenya.

Mandl wrote the book "Usprkos svemu ostaju sjećanja (In spite of all the memories remain)", in which he described his life.
