= João Pedro (footballer, born April 1996) =

Brazilian footballer

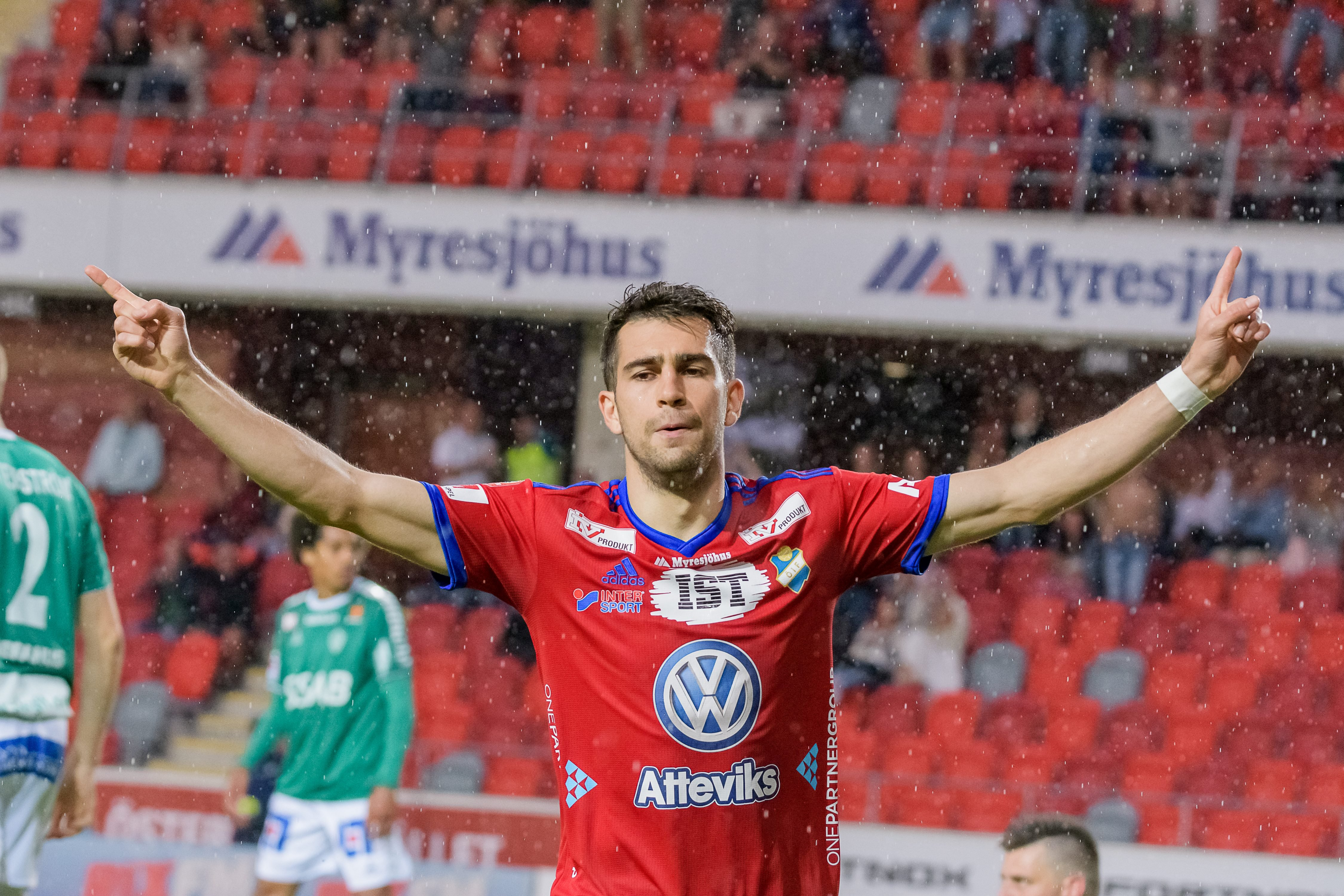

Personal information
- Full name: João Pedro Maciel Gomes
- Date of birth: April 25, 1996 (age 30)
- Place of birth: Brazil
- Height: 1.74 m (5 ft 8 1/2 in)
- Position: Attacking midfielder

Team information
- Current team: FC Pinzgau Saalfelden
- Number: 20

Youth career
- –2014: Audax
- 2013–2014: → Atlético Mineiro (loan)

Senior career*
Years	Team	Apps	(Gls)
2013	Audax	0	(0)
2014–2017	Coimbra	0	(0)
2015–2016	→ FC Liefering (loan)	32	(9)
2016	→ Oeste (loan)	2	(0)
2017	Austria Lustenau	5	(0)
2018	Maringá FC	6	(1)
2018–2019	Östers IF	19	(2)
2020	Maringá FC	0	(0)
2020	→ Nacional-MG (loan)	6	(0)
2021–	FC Pinzgau Saalfelden	119	(27)
- * Club domestic league appearances and goals as of 27 June 2026

João Pedro Maciel Gomes, known as João Pedro (born 25 April 1996) is a Brazilian professional association football player who plays for FC Pinzgau Saalfelden.

== Club career ==
He made his Austrian Football First League debut for FC Liefering on 27 February 2017 in a game against SC Austria Lustenau and scored on his debut.

On 2 July 2018, he signed for Östers IF in Superettan, Sweden's second tier, on a one-year contract (with an option for a further).

== Honours ==
Liefering

- Austrian Football First League runner-up: 2014–15

Osasco Audax

- Copa Paulista runner-up: 2013
