= FC Pinzgau Saalfelden =

Austrian association football club

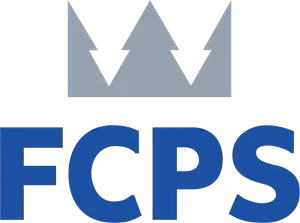
- Full name: Fußballclub Pinzgau Saalfelden
- Founded: 23 May 2007; 18 years ago
- Ground: 1508 Saalfelden Arena
- Capacity: 1,500
- Chairman: Siegfried Kainz; Christian Herzog; Herbert Bründlinger
- Head coach: Markus Fürstaller
- League: Regionalliga West
- 2024–25: Regionalliga West, 10th of 16

FC Pinzgau Saalfelden is an Austrian football club from Saalfelden in the federal state of Salzburg. The club plays in the Regionalliga West which is the third tier of Austrian football, and has played there since the 2014–15 season.

== History ==
FC Pinzgau Saalfelden was founded on 23 May 2007 after the merger of the town's football clubs 1. Saalfeldner SK (founded in 1947) and ESV Saalfelden (founded in 1952), although the two clubs had previous partnered as SG Saalfelden from 2004 to 2007.

In December 2019, Fan Owned Club, Inc. finalized a purchase agreement to operate FC Pinzgau Saalfelden. Fan Owned Club allowed fans to buy shares which gave them insider access to the team and operations. After this purchase the team was used for player development by various Major League Soccer teams, who loan out young players for short stints.

In December 2024, Fan Owned Club closed due to financial issues.

== Players ==
=== Current squad ===
As of 20 October 2024

Note: Flags indicate national team as defined under FIFA eligibility rules; some limited exceptions apply. Players may hold more than one non-FIFA nationality.

No.	Pos.	Nation	Player
1	GK	BIH	Ammar Hasanović
2	FW	CRO	Marko Čolić
—	FW	HUN	Barna Keresztes
5	MF	CRO	Domagoj Galešić
6	FW	AUT	Luca Kröll
7	MF	AUT	Ahmet Keles
—	MF	CRO	Andreas Lovrec
9	MF	AUT	Raphael Streitwieser
10	MF	AUT	Philipp Zehentmayr
11	FW	AUT	Lukas Moosmann
12	MF	AUT	Ramzan Dudaew
13	DF	GER	Alessandro Ziege
14	FW	HUN	Tamás Tandari

No.	Pos.	Nation	Player
15	MF	BRA	Murilo Henrique
16	MF	EGY	Zior Ramo
17	DF	GHA	Felix Adjei
18	MF	AUT	Benjamin Hutter
19	FW	AUT	Maurice Entleitner
20	MF	BRA	João Pedro
21	MF	AUT	Anes Mašić
23	MF	AUT	Daniel Hutter
26	MF	AUT	Ratan Dudaew
27	DF	AUT	Noah De Mas
29	MF	AUT	Alexander Wangler
33	GK	AUT	Nick Jurescha

=== Notable former players ===
- (United States) Andrew Brody
- (Canada) Josh Heard
- (Burundi) Bienvenue Kanakimana
- (Hungary) Norbert Németh
- (United States) Sean Okoli
- (Argentina) Pablo Ruiz

== Honours ==
- Salzburger Liga: 2010–11, 2013–14
- SFV-Stiegl-Landescup: 2023–2024, 2024-2025

== Other websites ==
- Official website
