= Hatzendorf =

- Former municipality
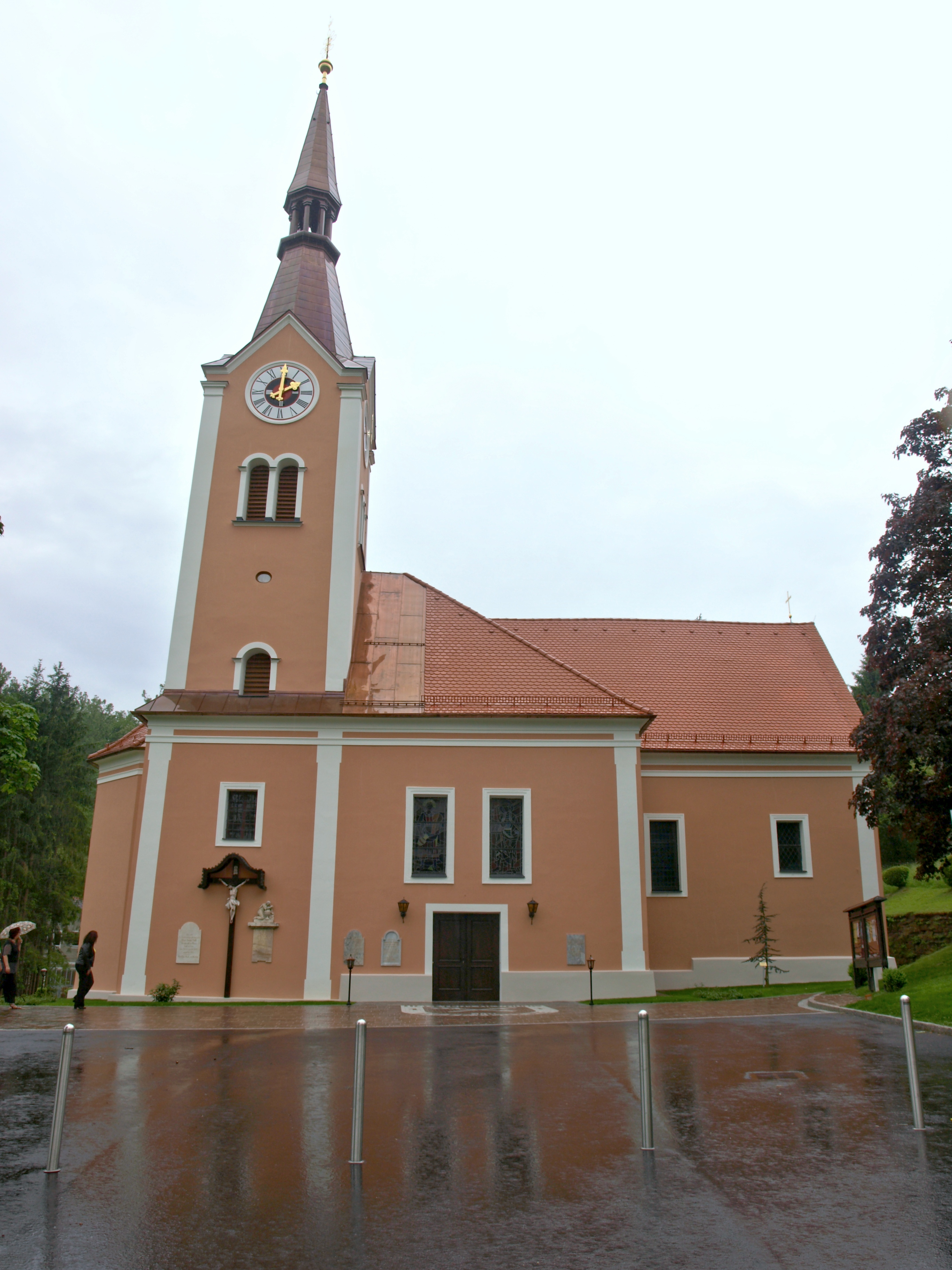
- Hatzendorf parish church

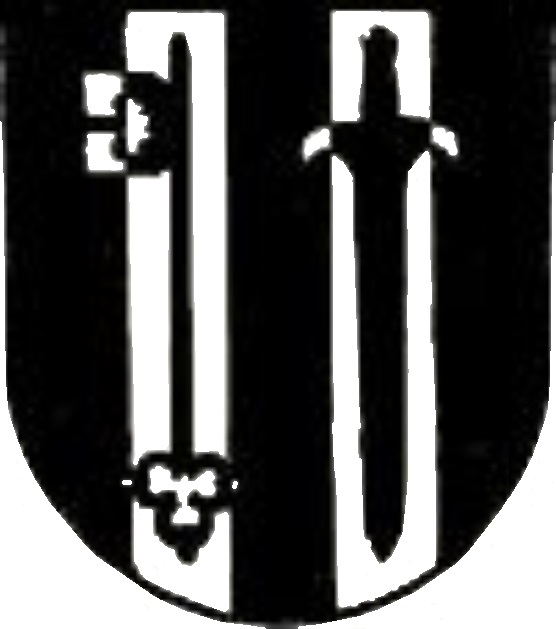
- Coat of arms

- Location within Austria
- Coordinates: 46°59′00″N 16°00′00″E
- Country: Austria
- State: Styria
- District: Südoststeiermark

Area
  - Total: 24.97 km^{2} (9.64 sq mi)
- Elevation: 298 m (978 ft)

Population (1 January 2016)
  - Total: 1,740
  - Density: 69.7/km^{2} (180/sq mi)
- Time zone: UTC+1 (CET)
  - Summer (DST): UTC+2 (CEST)
- Postal code: 8361
- Area code: +43 3155
- Vehicle registration: SO before 2013 FB
- Website: www.hatzendorf.info

Hatzendorf is a former municipality in the district of Südoststeiermark in the Austrian state of Styria. Since the 2015 Styria municipal structural reform, it is part of the municipality Fehring.

== Population ==
Historical population
Year	Pop.	±%
1869	1,989	—
1880	2,003	+0.7%
1890	2,054	+2.5%
1900	2,022	−1.6%
1910	2,180	+7.8%
1923	2,181	+0.0%
1934	2,101	−3.7%
1939	1,998	−4.9%
1951	1,910	−4.4%
1961	1,806	−5.4%
1971	1,856	+2.8%
1981	1,879	+1.2%
1991	1,938	+3.1%
2001	1,864	−3.8%
2013	1,749	−6.2%
