= Sebastian Breuer =

Austrian footballer

Personal information
- Date of birth: 21 February 2003 (age 23)
- Position: Defender

Team information
- Current team: Juniors OÖ
- Number: 16

Youth career
- 2010–2014: ASKÖ SC Kirchberg-Thening
- 2014–2017: Union Edelweiß Linz
- 2015: → ASKÖ Leonding (youth loan)
- 2017–2020: LASK

Senior career*
Years	Team	Apps	(Gls)
2020–	Juniors OÖ	1	(0)

International career^{‡}
2017–2018	Austria U15	6	(0)
2018–2019	Austria U16	10	(0)
- * Club domestic league appearances and goals as of 18:18, 7 June 2020 (UTC) ‡ National team caps and goals as of 18:18, 7 June 2020 (UTC)

Sebastian Breuer (born 21 February 2003) is an Austrian footballer currently playing as a defender for Juniors OÖ.

== Career statistics ==
=== Club ===
As of 7 June 2020.

Appearances and goals by club, season and competition
Club	Season	League			Cup		Continental		Other		Total	
Club	Season	Division	Apps	Goals	Apps	Goals	Apps	Goals	Apps	Goals	Apps	Goals
Juniors OÖ	2019–20	2. Liga	1	0	0	0	–		0	0	1	0
Career total			1	0	0	0	0	0	0	0	1	0
