= Haller Park (Kenya) =

Nature park in Kenya

Coordinates: 4°1′0″S 39°43′10″E

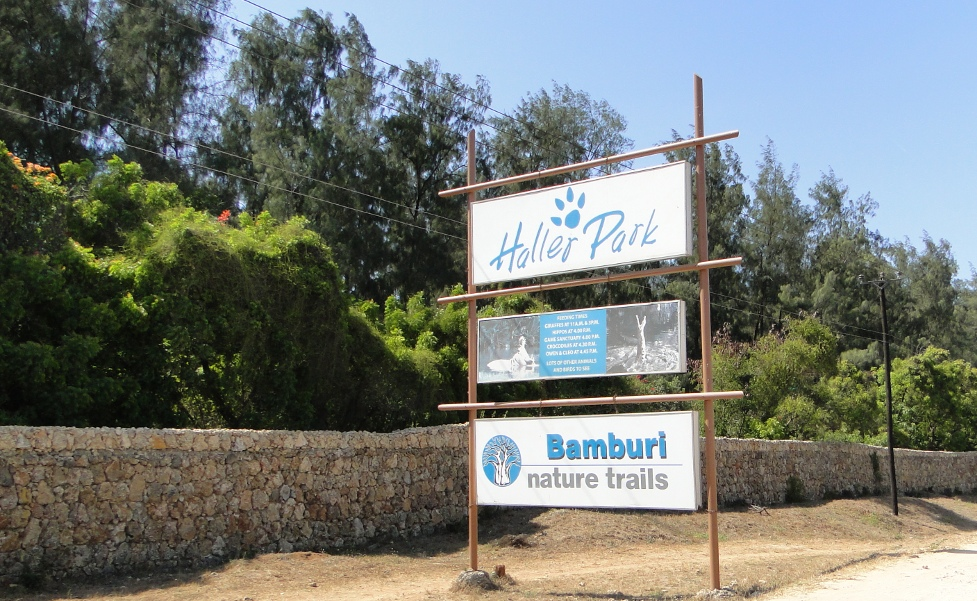
Entrance to Haller Park

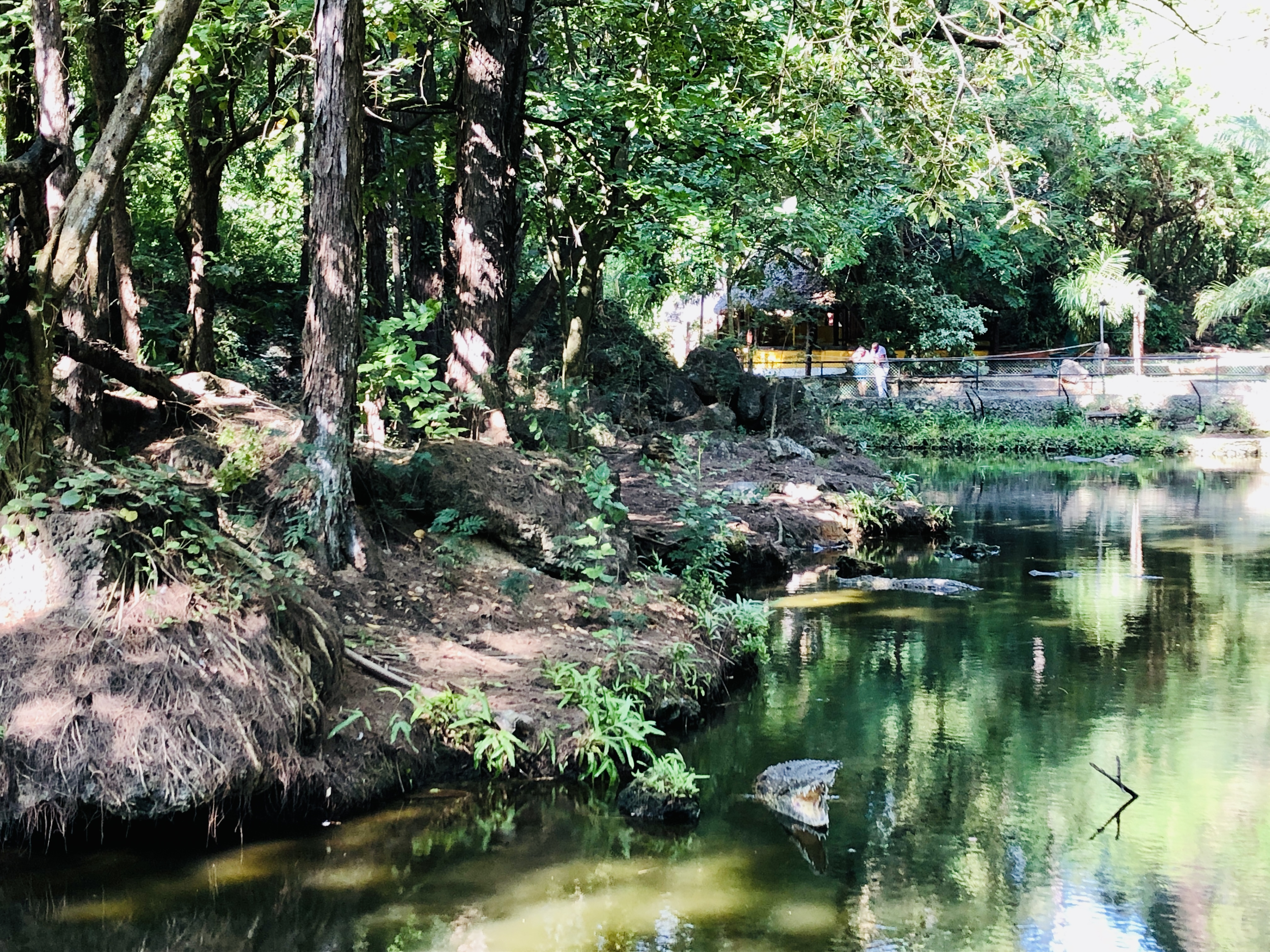
Interior of the Haller Park

Haller Park is a nature park in Bamburi, Mombasa, on the Kenyan coast. It is the transformation of a quarry wasteland into an ecological area. Haller Park holds a variety of plant and animal species which serve as a recreation spot for tourists and locals. Up to March 2007 it held the attraction of Owen and Mzee – the friendship of a hippopotamus and a tortoise.

== History of the rehabilitation project ==
=== Effect of cement production ===
In 1952, Cementia Holding searched for a site at the East African Coast to build a cement factory. Felix Mandl found a location 12 km (7.5 mi) north of Mombasa. Over the years cement production grew from 1.2 million tons to 25 million tons. The area soon became inhospitable arid wasteland with brackish water. The Bamburi Cement company decided to rehabilitate the quarries which seemed to be an impossible task. No plants had been able to establish themselves there. In 1959, Rene Haller was hired as manager of the garden department and given the task to beautify the area. In the 1970s Haller embarked on the reforestation project.

=== Task ===
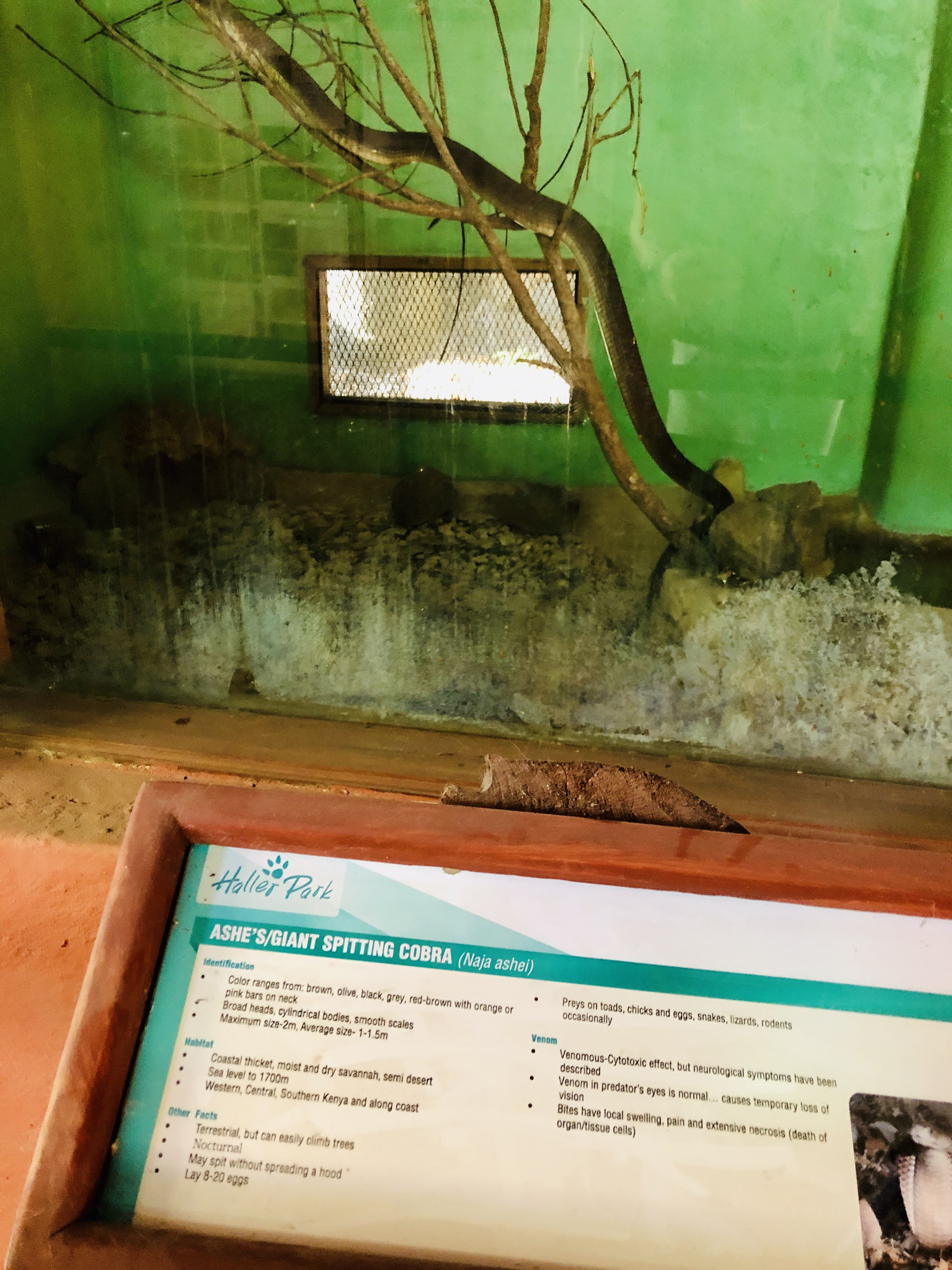
Spitting cobra in the Haller Park

The vital task was to find pioneer plants which could survive the limestone desert. The plants had to survive the fierce tropical sun. After planting 26 plants only three of them survived: The damas, coconut palm, and the casuarina.

==== Casuarina ====
The casuarina was used initially to colonise the barren quarry floor. The casuarina is adapted to grow under severe conditions. Its branchlets look like pine needles and have a strong outer surface skin which protects the tree against loss of water. The casuarina could tolerate salty water which seemed perfect for the environment. However, due to the causarina's high tannin content its needles are too tough and bitter to be broken down by bacteria into humus for other plants to grow in.

==== Introduction of the millipedes ====
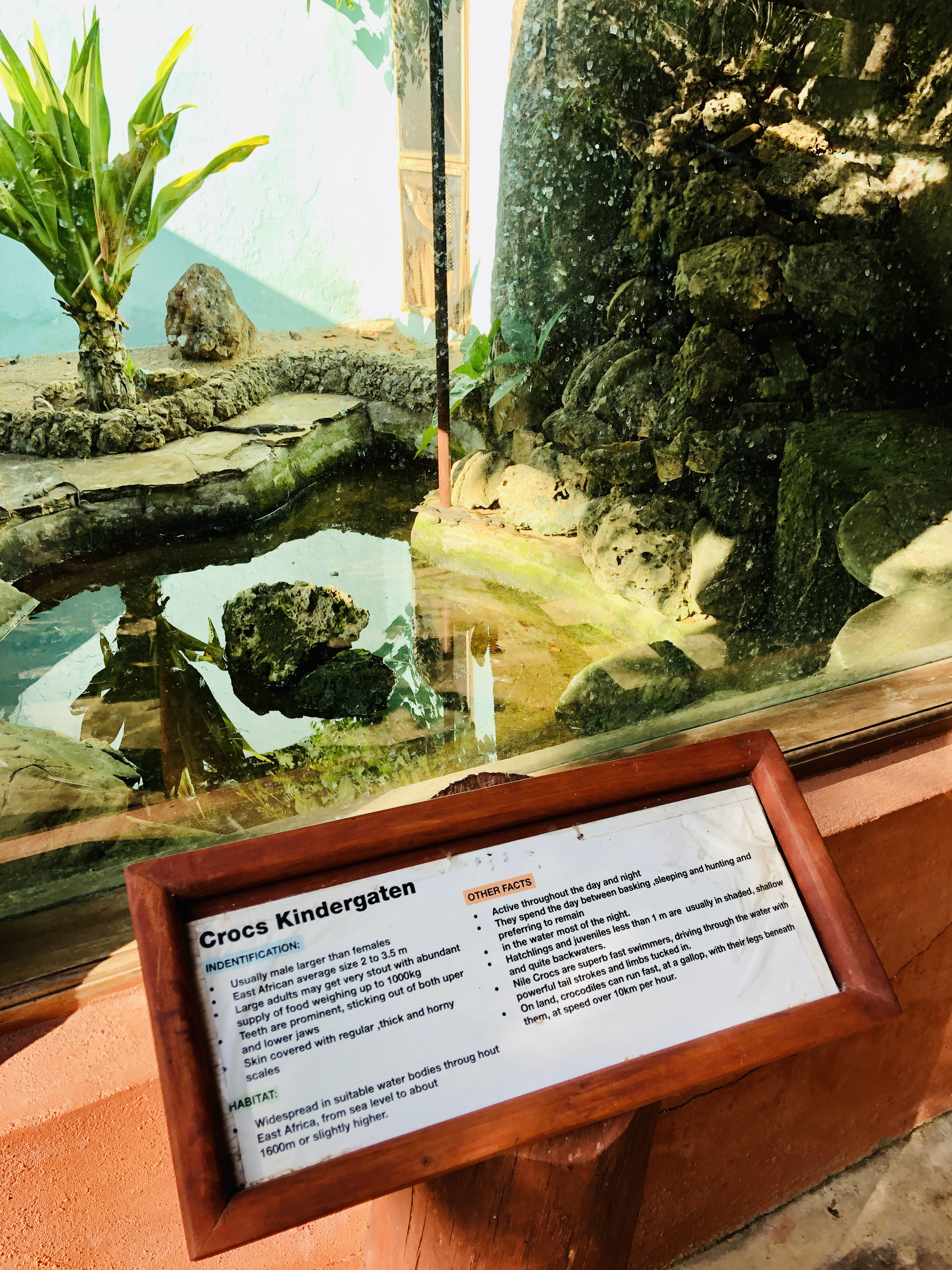
Crocodile nursery in the Haller Park

Haller observed a red legged millipede (Mombasa trains) feeding on dry casuarina needles and introduced hundreds of millipedes into the quarry forest. The droppings of the millipede while feeding on the casuarina needles made it easier for bacteria to break down resulting in a rich layer of humus allowing other plant species to grow.

After five years the casuarina began self-seeding and colonizing the surrounding area. After 10 years the casuarina trees reached a height of 30 m. After 20 years some of the trees had a trunk circumference of 2.4 meters and the humus layer was 10 cm deep. Many of the trees began to collapse after 20 years. However they had accomplished their task and created a friendly environment conducive to new plants. The tree trunks were used for building timber and firewood.

=== Effect on vegetation ===
More plants distributed by wind and animal established themselves in the quarry. The next tree species were carefully selected. The quarry slowly developed into a sanctuary for endangered species of plants. Over the years, over 180 species of indigenous trees and bushes have been planted. Modes of propagation of plants however vary, all in the aim of ensuring succession. Vervet monkeys, insects and some bird species have participated actively in succession within the ecosystem. They feed on fruits of the ficus trees, whose seeds must travel through an alimentary canal to completely break dormancy. If this step take place, the seeds have to be boiled to achieve the same effect. When animals excrete, the seeds are dispersed in their feces and those that hit fertile ground may germinate. This has helped achieve growth in parts of the forest that are not easily accessible by humans.

== Animals ==
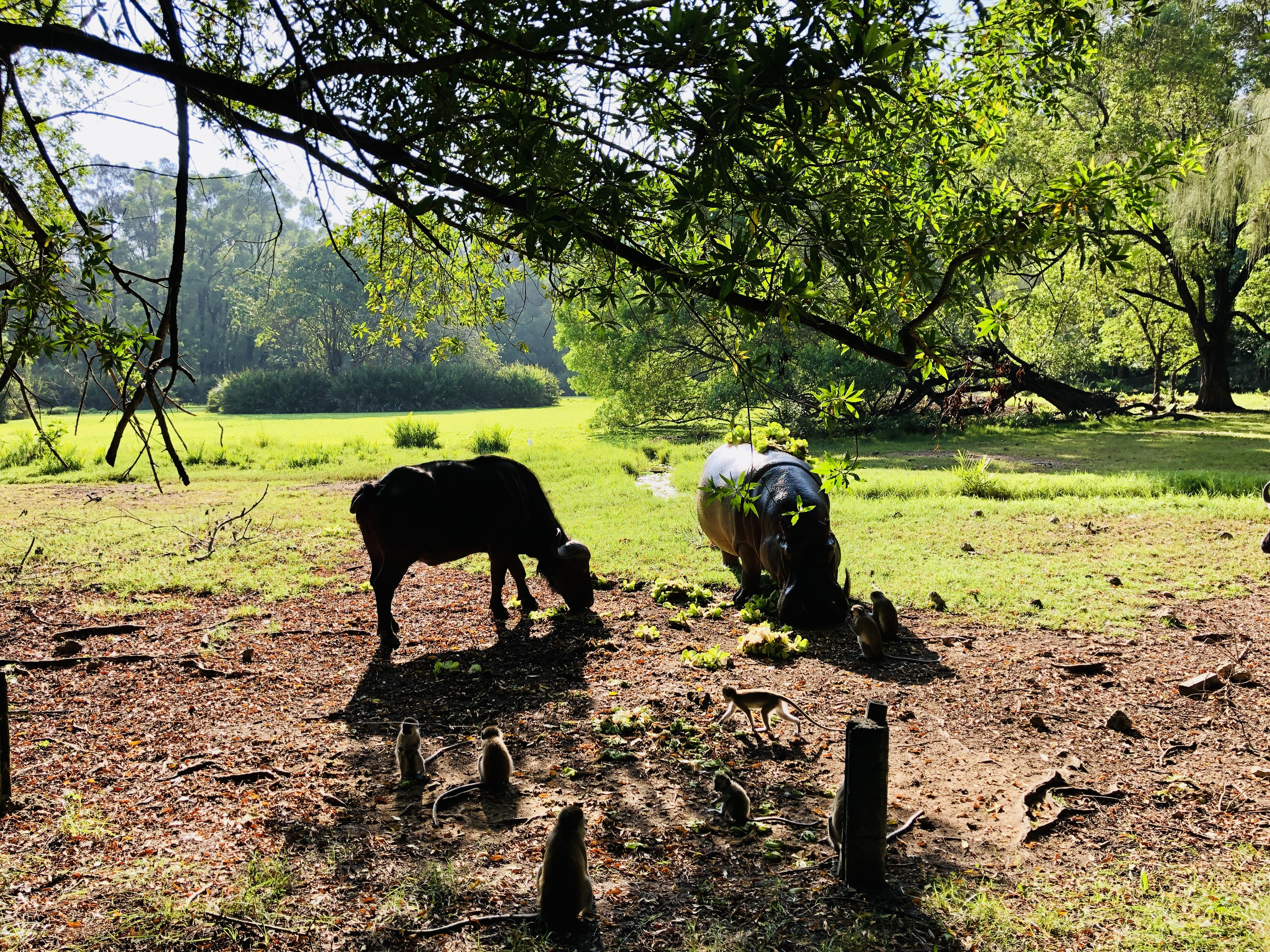
Buffalo and Hippo in the Haller Park

Rene Haller believed animals should play an equally important role in the forest ecosystem as plants. The introduction of the millipedes into the casuarina forest triggered a chain reaction of colonization by plants and animals. The creation of new habitats attracted birds, insects, and mammals. Some larger mammals were introduced while others moved in.

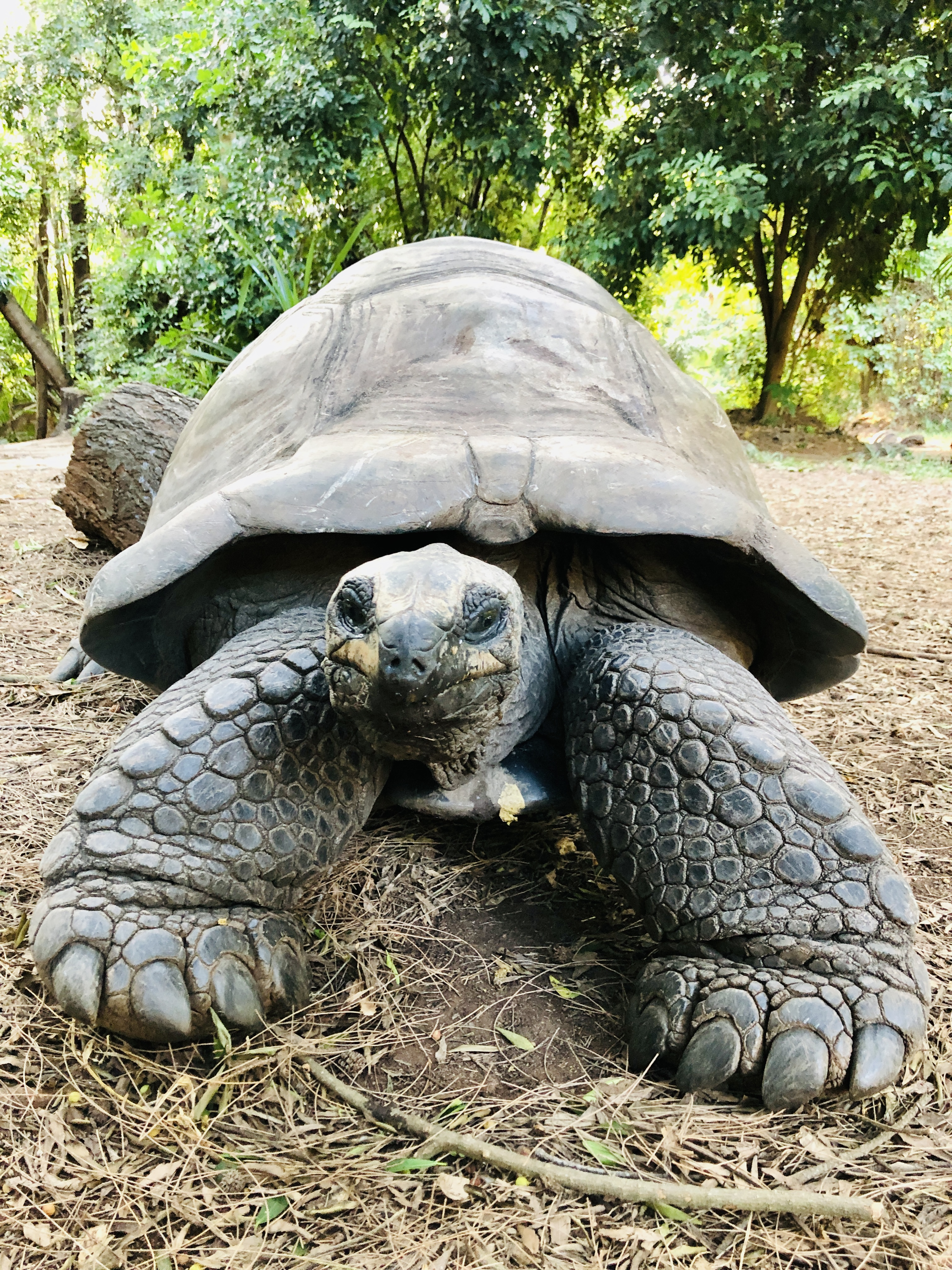
Tortoise in the Haller Park

The mammals affected the environment. For example, the bushpigs which feed on roots, maggots, and insects helped to aerate the trees' root systems. The female giraffes feed on leaves and dispersed plants seeds while their faeces acted as fertiliser. The dung beetles also played a role by helping bring the manure underground where it is broken down by micro-organisms creating further plant life.

=== Elands ===
The elands were chosen for domestication at Haller Park because of their usefulness. The eland produces milk which is nutritious and has antibiotic properties which allows the milk stay fresh for months. Elands are also resistant to most livestock diseases and tame easily.

=== Oryx ===
Rene Haller also introduced oryx to supplement the eland group. The oryx adapt to cope with poor grazing. They feed on dry, nutrient poor grasses. They have a great capacity to digest fibres. During droughts and desert conditions, the oryx can survive. They are independent of permanent water sources. The oryx were the perfect candidates for the condition of the park.

== Aquaculture ==
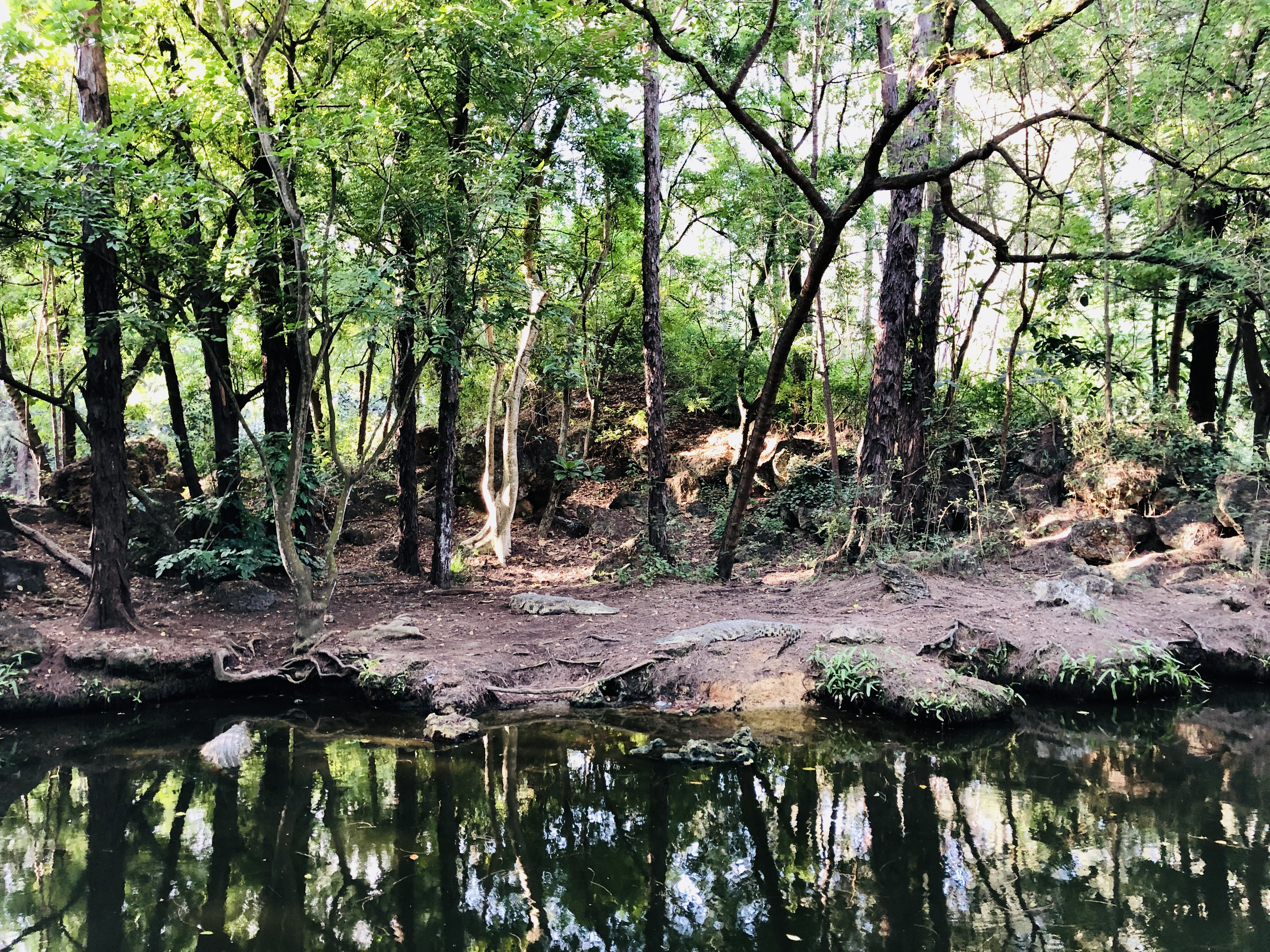
Crocodiles in the Haller Park

Water was an essential resource for the development of the plant life in the quarry. Water played an important role in the economic and ecological development of the project. The aquaculture system at Haller Park is commercially viable. The unit consists of the fish farm, crocodile area, and the biological water treatment area (Nile cabbage ponds and rice paddy fields). The Nile cabbage is a special plant which removes excess nutrients and impurities form the water body.

=== Fish farm ===
The fish farm is a part of Haller Park. In 1971, The fish farming project started alongside the reforestation project. Rene Haller created a fish tank system. The purpose of the tank system was to give the fish a chance to swim in a constant current. A tilapia farm was also created in 1980 because of the success of the fish tanks. It produced 30–35 tons per year.

List of animals and plants

Mammals

- Wahlberg's epauletted fruit bat
- Vervet monkey
- Sykes' monkey
- Serval cat (Felis serval)
- Giraffe
- Hippopotamus
- Sitatunga
- Defassa waterbuck
- Zebra
- Buffalo
- Eland
- East African oryx
- Suni

Reptiles

- Bush snake (Philothamnus)
- Strip bellied sand snake (Psammophis subtaeniatus)
- Crocodiles

Fish

- Tilapia
- Lungfish
- Catfish

Birds

- Crowned crane
- Yellow billed stork
- Marabou
- Oxpecker
- Egyptian geese
- Guineafowl

Arthropods

- Spider
- Red-legged millipede
- Wasp
- Butterfly
- Dung beetle
- Weaver ant
- Honey bee

Plants

- Casuarina
- Algaroba
- Neem
- Orchids – cyrtotchis arcuata
- Asystacia gangetica
- Tamarix nilotica
- Phyncholythrum repens
- Paspalum vaginatum
- Coral hibiscus
- Cyads
- Fernandoa magnifica

Other

- Plankton
- Fungi (including mushrooms)
