= Philipp Seidl =

Austrian footballer

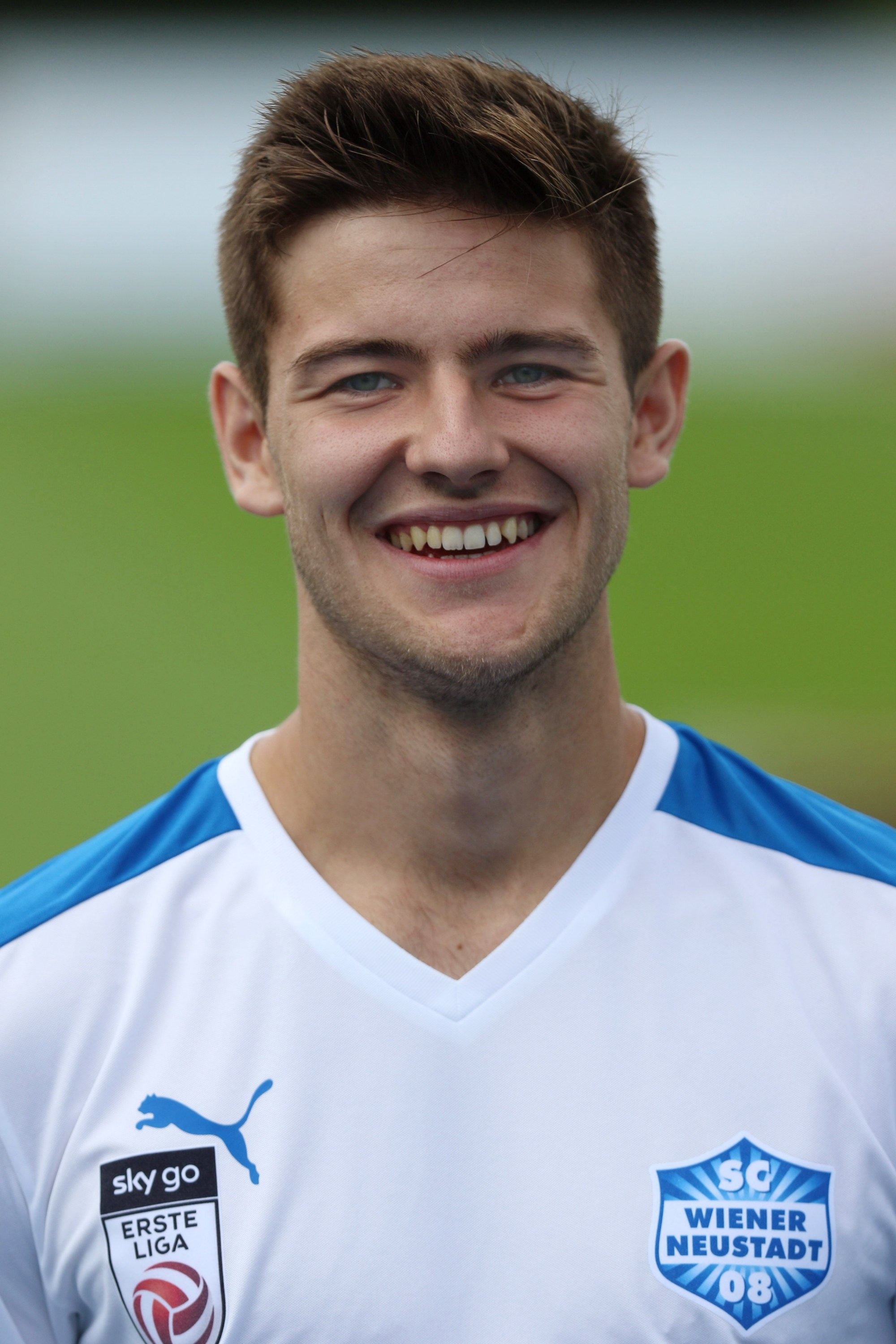
- Seidl in 2017

Personal information
- Date of birth: 20 December 1997 (age 28)
- Place of birth: Gleisdorf, Austria
- Height: 1.80 m (5 ft 11 in)
- Position: Right-back

Team information
- Current team: ASK Voitsberg
- Number: 20

Youth career
- 2003–2008: USV Pircha
- 2008–2009: SC Gleisdorf 1919
- 2009–2010: FC Gleisdorf 09
- 2010–2014: Sturm Graz

Senior career*
Years	Team	Apps	(Gls)
2014–2020	Sturm Graz II	75	(3)
2017–2018	→ Wiener Neustadt (loan)	3	(0)
2018–2019	→ SV Lafnitz (loan)	15	(1)
2019–2020	→ SV Kapfenberg (loan)	16	(0)
2021	FC Gleisdorf 09		
2021–2023	Grazer AK	19	(1)
2023–2024	Kapfenberger SV	28	(2)
2024–	ASK Voitsberg	18	(1)

International career
2012–2013	Austria U16	13	(1)
2013–2014	Austria U17	9	(0)
2014–2015	Austria U18	6	(0)
2016	Austria U19	3	(0)
2017	Austria U21	2	(0)
- * Club domestic league appearances and goals as of 12 June 2025

Philipp Seidl (born 20 December 1997) is an Austrian professional footballer who plays as a right-back for ASK Voitsberg.

== Club career ==
He made his Austrian Football First League debut for SC Wiener Neustadt on 8 August 2017 in a game against TSV Hartberg.

On 19 June 2021 he signed with Grazer AK.
