= Gerhard Dombaxi =

German footballer

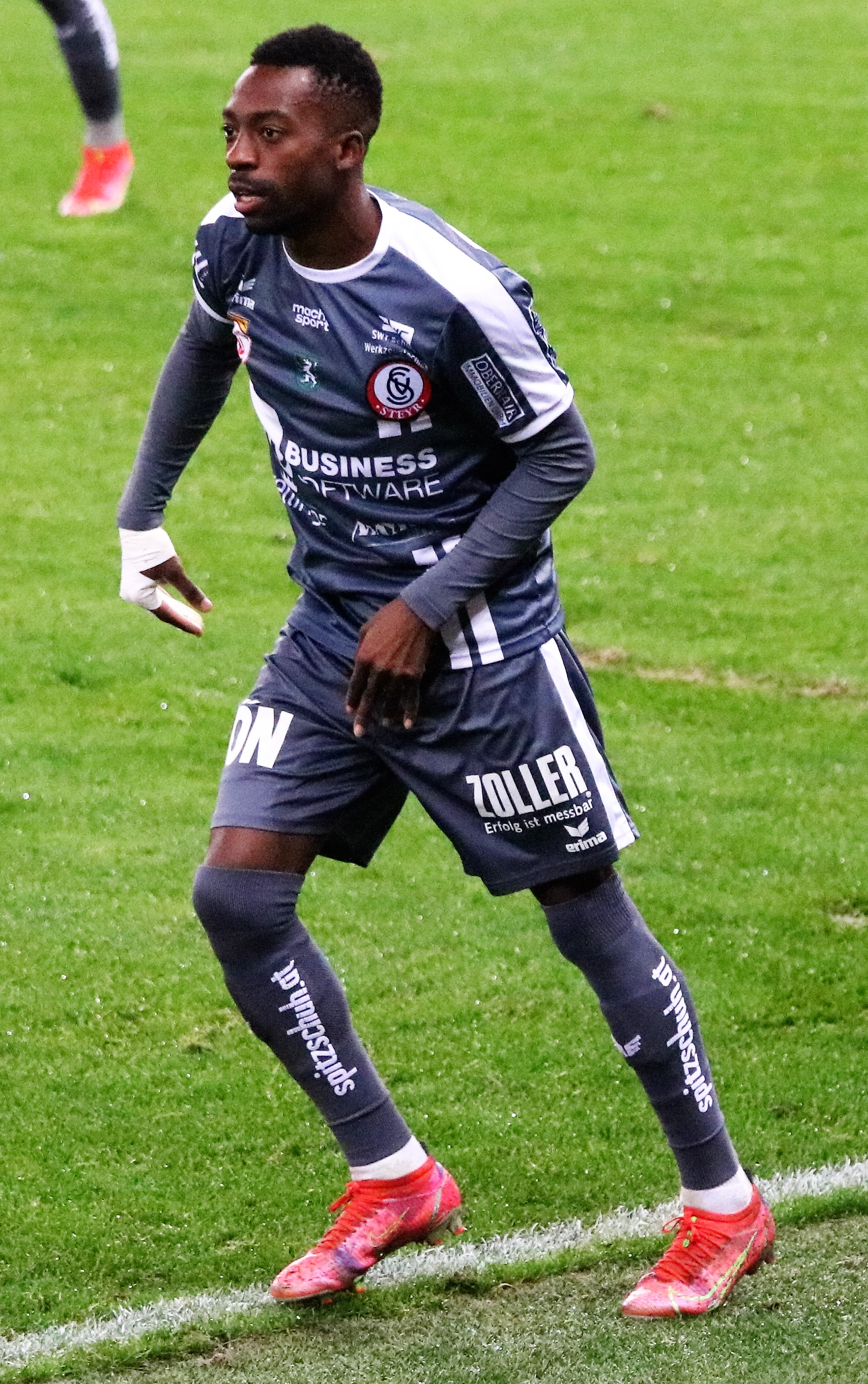
- Dombaxi in 2021

Personal information
- Full name: Gerhard Mena Dombaxi
- Date of birth: 20 October 1996 (age 30)
- Place of birth: Germany
- Height: 1.81 m (5 ft 11 in)
- Position: Midfielder

Team information
- Current team: SKN St. Pölten
- Number: 70

Youth career
- –2013: VfR Kaiserslautern

Senior career*
Years	Team	Apps	(Gls)
2016–2018	SV Morlautern	59	(3)
2018–2020	Blau-Weiß Linz	21	(2)
2021–2023	SK Vorwärts Steyr	57	(9)
2023–	SKN St. Pölten	43	(4)
- * Club domestic league appearances and goals as of 12 June 2025

Gerhard Mena Dombaxi (born 20 October 1996) is a German professional footballer who plays as a midfielder for Austrian side SKN St. Pölten.

== Career statistics ==
As of 4 July 2019

Appearances and goals by club, season and competition
Club	Season	League			Cup		Continental		Other		Total	
Club	Season	Division	Apps	Goals	Apps	Goals	Apps	Goals	Apps	Goals	Apps	Goals
SV Morlautern	2016–17	Oberliga Rheinland-Pfalz/Saar	23	1	0	0	–		0	0	23	1
SV Morlautern	2017–18	Oberliga Rheinland-Pfalz/Saar	36	2	1	0	–		0	0	37	2
SV Morlautern	Total		59	3	1	0	0	0	0	0	60	3
Blau-Weiß Linz	2018–19	2. Liga	13	2	0	0	–		0	0	13	2
Career total			72	5	1	0	–		0	0	73	5
