= Bamburi =

- Location within Kenya
- Coordinates: 4°0′S 39°43′E
- Country: Kenya
- County: Mombasa
- Sub-county: Kisauni
- Ward: Bamburi
- Areas/Estates: Jomo Kenyatta Public Beach, previously known as Giriama Beach near milele Beach hotel, Bamburi Cement Factory, Haller Park, Vescon, Lakeview, Amazon, Fisheries, Mtambo, Kadzandani, Kiembeni, Nairobi estate, Bamburi mwisho, Matingasi, Vikwatani, Bamburi Airport, Mwembe Legeza
- Other wards: Shanzu, Mtopanga, Mwakirunge, Mjambere, Magogoni and Junda.
- Time zone: UTC+3 (EAT)

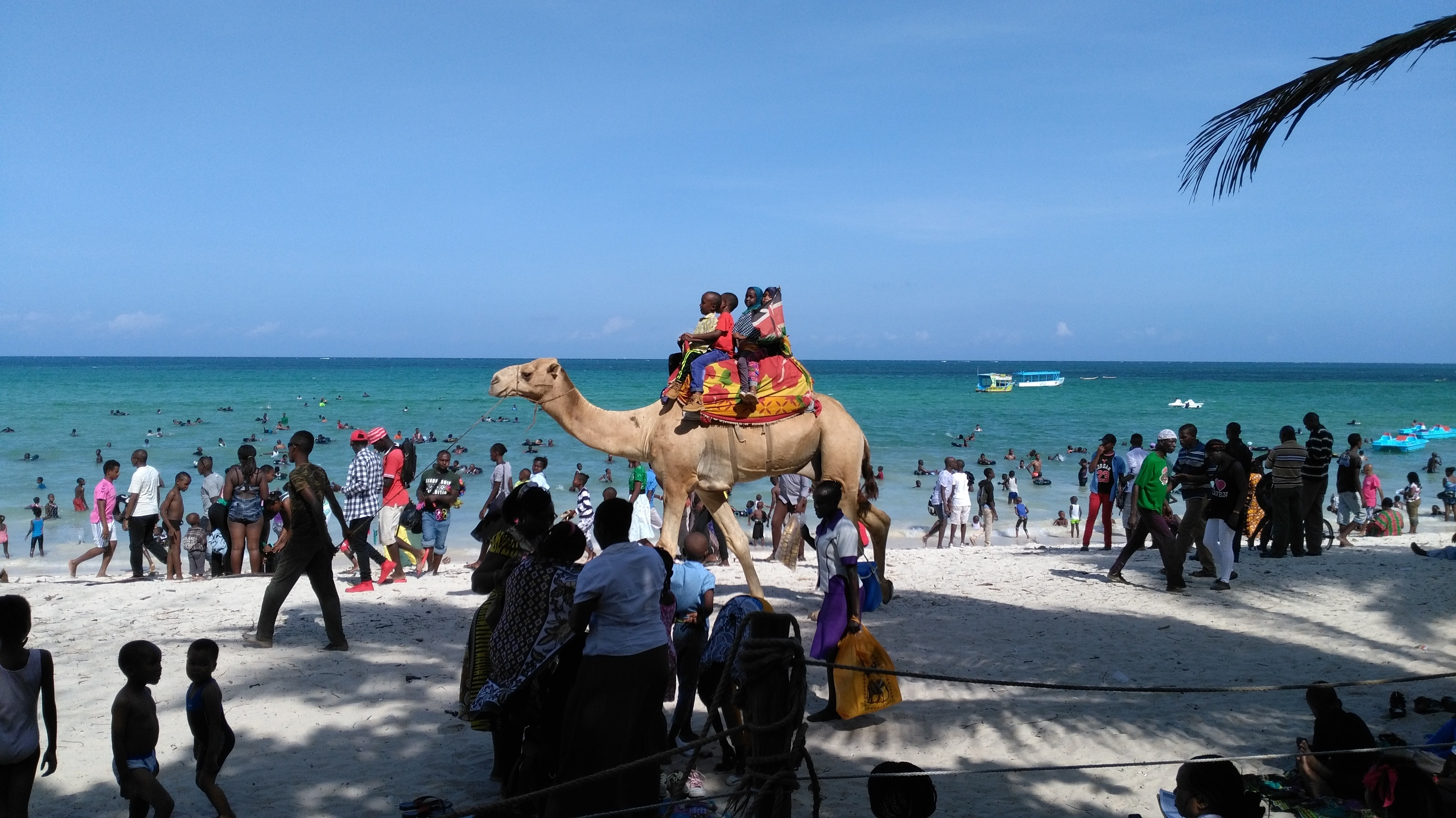
Families on the beach.

Bamburi /ˌbæmˈbɜːriː/ (Swahili: [ɓɑ'ᵐburi]), from the local bantu words "Ba" (People) and "Mburi" (Goat), is a commercial, industrial and local electoral, administrative and a tourist and residential area on the Kenyan north-coast which extends from the coastline on the Indian Ocean to the surrounding middle and low-income settlements on the mainland. Administratively, Bamburi is in the Kisauni sub-county of Mombasa and has tourist and beach-front facilities, which include international and local hotels and parks such as Serena International Beach Hotel, Sai Rock Hotel, Kahamas Hotel, Haller Park and Butterfly Pavilion. Bamburi Cement Ltd, a major cement quarry and factory, is also situated in the area and is one of the iconic enterprises. The most popular residential estates within Bamburi include Kiembeni Estate, Nairobi Estate and Bamburi Mwisho. It is a cultural melting pot, with a pulsating night life, especially the area between Front Line and the Bamburi Cement Ltd factory, populated by a line of clubs, sports pubs, eateries and small businesses.

== Haller Park ==
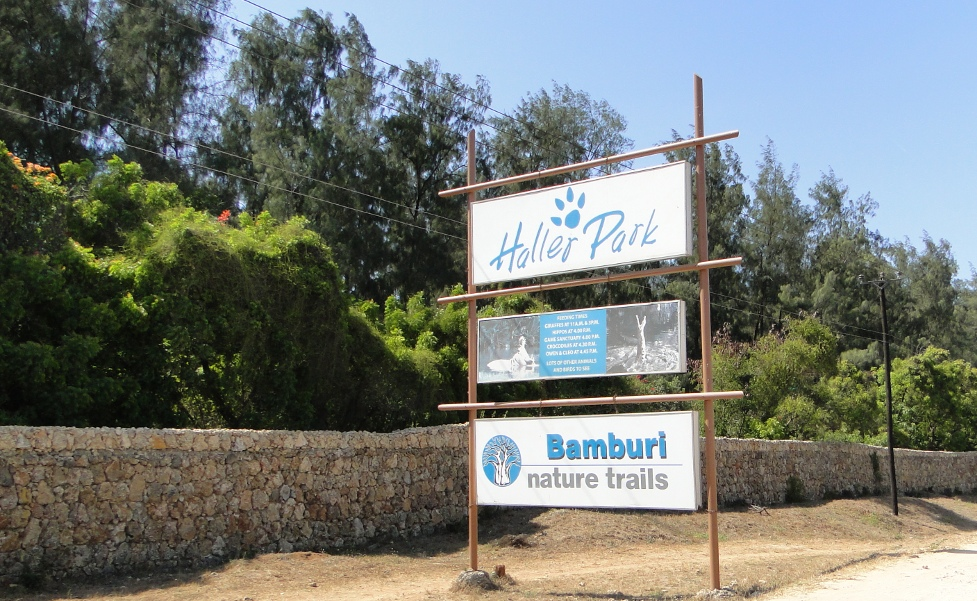
Entrance to Haller Park.

In 1971, Rene Haller transformed parts of the cement and quarry complex into a nature reserve which was eventually named after him. The 11 km^{2} area holds a variety of native game, and (prior to 2007) the highly covered attraction of Owen and Mzee – the friendship of a hippopotamus and a tortoise.

== Transport ==
Bamburi is reached by bus or matatu from Mombasa island en route to Mtwapa or Malindi. Terminal matatus serve the Bamburi Cement complex.
