= Rene Haller =

Swiss naturalist

René Daniel Haller (born 18 December 1933 in Lenzburg, Switzerland), is a Swiss naturalist trained in horticulture, landscaping and tropical agronomy. Since the 1970s, he has been known for his commitment to environmental restoration, such as the restoration of a limestone quarry wasteland in Mombasa, Kenya, into the nature park and wildlife sanctuary named Haller Park.

Haller is a recipient of a number of awards. He was one of the first recipients of the prestigious Global 500 Roll of Honor by the United Nations for his 'outstanding environmental achievements. He is a Trustee of the Haller Foundation, the Director of The Baobab Trust, and interim Chair of the Kenya Wildlife Service Board of Trustees.

== Awards and honors ==
In 1987, Haller was awarded the prestigious UNEP Global 500 Roll of Honor by the United Nations, for his 'outstanding environmental achievements'.

In 1991 he received the Swiss Brandenberger prize, as well as an Honorary Doctor's degree from the University of Basle. In April 2003, he was appointed to the board of the Kenyan Wildlife Service.
