= 2022–23 SK Sturm Graz season =

SK Sturm Graz
2022–23 season
- Chairman: Christian Jauk
- Head coach: Christian Ilzer
- Stadium: Merkur Arena
- Austrian Bundesliga: 2nd
- Austrian Cup: Winners
- UEFA Champions League: Third qualifying round
- UEFA Europa League: Group stage
- Top goalscorer: League: Emanuel Emegha (9); All: Emanuel Emegha (10)

The 2022–23 season was the 114th in the history of SK Sturm Graz and their 57th consecutive season in the top flight. The club participated in the Austrian Football Bundesliga, the Austrian Cup, the UEFA Champions League, and the UEFA Europa League.

== Players ==
=== First-team squad ===
As of 30 August 2022

Note: Flags indicate national team as defined under FIFA eligibility rules; some limited exceptions apply. Players may hold more than one non-FIFA nationality.

No.	Pos.	Nation	Player
4	DF	SLO	Jon Gorenc Stanković
5	DF	SUI	Gregory Wüthrich
6	DF	AUT	Aleksandar Borković (on loan from Hoffenheim)
8	MF	AUT	Alexander Prass
10	MF	GEO	Otar Kiteishvili
11	MF	AUT	Manprit Sarkaria
13	FW	AUT	Jakob Jantscher
14	DF	AUT	Paul Komposch
16	MF	AUT	Sandro Schendl
17	MF	AUT	Lukas Jäger
18	DF	CRO	Alois Oroz (on loan from Vitesse)
20	FW	AUT	Martin Krienzer
20	FW	NED	Emanuel Emegha
21	MF	AUT	Samuel Stückler
22	DF	BIH	Jusuf Gazibegović

No.	Pos.	Nation	Player
23	FW	AUT	Luca Kronberger
24	DF	AUT	Sandro Ingolitsch
25	MF	AUT	Stefan Hierländer
26	MF	AUT	Christoph Lang
27	GK	AUT	Jörg Siebenhandl
28	DF	AUT	David Schnegg
29	FW	GHA	Mohammed Fuseini
30	MF	AUT	Ivan Ljubić
32	GK	AUT	Tobias Schützenauer
35	DF	AUT	Niklas Geyrhofer
36	DF	AUT	Vincent Trummer
37	DF	AUT	Moritz Wels
42	DF	AUT	David Affengruber
44	DF	MLI	Amadou Dante
—	FW	DEN	William Bøving

=== Out on loan ===
Note: Flags indicate national team as defined under FIFA eligibility rules; some limited exceptions apply. Players may hold more than one non-FIFA nationality.

No.	Pos.	Nation	Player
—	GK	AUT	Christopher Giuliani (at Kapfenberg until 30 June 2022)
—	DF	AUT	Florian Weiler (at Hartberg until 30 June 2022)

No.	Pos.	Nation	Player
—	MF	AUT	Dardan Shabanhaxhaj (at Kapfenberg until 30 June 2022)

== Pre-season and friendlies ==
Win Draw Loss Fixtures

25 June 2022 Friendly	Voitsberg	0–11	Sturm Graz	Voitsberg
17:00 CEST (UTC+2)		Report		Stadium: Sparkassen-Arena Voitsberg

2 July 2022 Friendly	Sturm Graz	0–0	Liefering	Schladming
15:00 CEST (UTC+2)		Report		Stadium: Stadion Schladming

2 July 2022 Friendly	Sturm Graz	1–1	Blau-Weiß Linz	Schladming
17:30 CEST (UTC+2)		Report		Stadium: Stadion Schladming

9 July 2022 Friendly	Sturm Graz	0–0	Zbrojovka Brno	Weiz
16:00 CEST (UTC+2)		Report		Stadium: SIEMENS Energy Stadion

9 July 2022 Friendly	Sturm Graz	2–1	Galatasaray	Graz
19:30 CEST (UTC+2)		Report		Stadium: Merkur Arena

26 July 2022 Friendly	Sturm Graz	4–0	Al-Wahda	Rottenmann
18:00 CEST (UTC+2)

23 September 2022 Friendly	Sturm Graz	5–1	Maribor	Wildon
15:00 CEST (UTC+2)	Oroz 22'; Bøving 23'; Prass 26'; Kiteishvili 38' (pen.); Lang 81'		Sirk 79' (pen.)	Stadium: Sportplatz Wildon

3 December 2022 Friendly	Sturm Graz	1–0	Almería	Benahavís, Spain
16:00 CET (UTC+1)	Emegha 60'			Stadium: Campo La Quinta; Referee: Enrique Pareja Nieto

5 December 2022 Friendly	Sturm Graz	1–2	Empoli	Spain
16:00 CET (UTC+1)		Report		Stadium: Campe de Futbol Atalaya Park Hotel

7 December 2022 Friendly	Sturm Graz	P–P	Nice	Spain
15:30 CET (UTC+1)

13 January 2023 Friendly	Sturm Graz	–	Mura

== Competitions ==
=== Overall record ===
Competition	First match	Last match	Starting round	Final position	Record							
Competition	First match	Last match	Starting round	Final position	Pld	W	D	L	GF	GA	GD	Win %
Austrian Football Bundesliga	23 July 2022		Matchday 1		22	14	6	2	37	15	+22	63.64
Austrian Cup	16 July 2022		First round		4	4	0	0	11	2	+9	100.00
UEFA Champions League	3 August 2022	9 August 2022	Third qualifying round	Third qualifying round	2	0	0	2	1	3	−2	0.00
UEFA Europa League	8 September 2022	3 November 2022	Group stage	Group stage	6	2	2	2	4	10	−6	33.33
Total					34	20	8	6	53	30	+23	58.82

Last updated: 19 March 2023
Source: Soccerway

=== Austrian Football Bundesliga ===
==== League table ====
Pos	Team	Pld	W	D	L	GF	GA	GD	Pts	Qualification
1	Red Bull Salzburg	22	17	4	1	49	13	+36	55	Qualification for the Championship round
2	Sturm Graz	22	14	6	2	37	15	+22	48	Qualification for the Championship round
3	LASK	22	10	8	4	38	28	+10	38	Qualification for the Championship round
4	Rapid Wien	22	10	3	9	34	26	+8	33	Qualification for the Championship round
5	Austria Wien	22	10	5	7	37	31	+6	32 (Note: Austria Wien were deducted 3 points due to license violation.)	Qualification for the Championship round

Source: Austrian Football Bundesliga
Rules for classification: 1) Points; 2) Head-to-head record; 3) Goal difference; 4) Goals scored; 5) Matches won; 6) Away matches won; 7) Away goals scored.
Notes:

Pos	Team	Pld	W	D	L	GF	GA	GD	Pts	Qualification	RBS	STU	LIN	RWI	AWI	KLA
1	Red Bull Salzburg (C)	32	23	8	1	67	22	+45	49	Qualification for the Champions League group stage	—	2–1	0–0	2–1	3–3	3–2
2	Sturm Graz	32	20	6	6	57	29	+28	42	Qualification for the Champions League third qualifying round	0–2	—	2–0	3–1	3–2	4–1
3	LASK	32	14	12	6	54	38	+16	35	Qualification for the Europa League play-off round	0–1	2–1	—	3–1	3–1	4–0
4	Rapid Wien	32	12	6	14	50	47	+3	25	Qualification for the Europa Conference League third qualifying round	1–1	3–2	1–1	—	3–3	3–1
5	Austria Wien (O)	32	11	10	11	55	52	+3	24	Qualification for the Europa Conference League play-offs	1–1	1–2	2–2	3–1	—	1–2

Source: Austrian Football Bundesliga
Legend: Blue = home team win; Yellow = draw; Red = away team win.
Rules for classification: 1) Points; 2) Points with (possible) half points subtracted due to rounding; 3) Head-to-head points; 4) Head-to-head goal difference; 5) Head-to-head goals scored; 6) Head-to-head away goals scored; 7) Goal difference; 8) Goals scored; 9) Matches won; 10) Away matches won; 11) Away goals scored.
(C) Champions; (O) Play-off winners

Pos	Team	Pld	W	D	L	GF	GA	GD	Pts	Qualification	WOL	LUS	WAT	HAR	ALT	RIE
1	Wolfsberger AC	32	12	6	14	51	51	0	31	Qualification for the Europa Conference League play-offs	—	2–2	2–0	2–2	0–0	1–0
2	Austria Lustenau	32	11	10	11	50	54	−4	29	Qualification for the Europa Conference League play-offs	1–3	—	2–4	5–1	1–0	2–2
3	WSG Tirol	32	10	8	14	44	53	−9	24		4–0	0–2	—	1–1	1–1	1–1
4	Hartberg	32	9	6	17	39	56	−17	24		0–2	0–1	5–0	—	2–2	2–0
5	Rheindorf Altach	32	6	10	16	29	53	−24	19		0–2	1–1	1–0	0–1	—	1–1
6	Ried (R)	32	4	11	17	27	50	−23	14	Relegation to Austrian Football Second League	1–2	4–4	1–1	1–3	0–1	—

Legend: Blue = home team win; Yellow = draw; Red = away team win.
Rules for classification: 1) Points; 2) Points with (possible) half points subtracted due to rounding; 3) Head-to-head points; 4) Head-to-head goal difference; 5) Head-to-head goals scored; 6) Head-to-head away goals scored; 7) Goal difference; 8) Goals scored; 9) Matches won; 10) Away matches won; 11) Away goals scored.
(R) Relegated

==== Results summary ====
Overall								Home						Away					
Pld	W	D	L	GF	GA	GD	Pts	W	D	L	GF	GA	GD	W	D	L	GF	GA	GD
28	18	6	4	48	23	+25	60	10	1	3	26	14	+12	8	5	1	22	9	+13

Last updated: 7 May 2023.
Source: Austrian Football Bundesliga

==== Results by round ====
Round	1	2	3	4	5	6	7	8	9	10	11	12	13	14	15	16	17	18	19	20	21	22	23	24	25	26	27	28	29	30	31	32
Ground	A	H	A	H	H	A	H	A	H	A	H	H	A	H	A	A	H	A	H	A	H	A	H	A	A	H	H	A	H	A	A	H
Result	D	W	D	W	L	W	D	W	W	W	W	W	D	W	D	D	W	W	L	W	W	W	W	L	W	L	W	W				
Position	6	3	4	3	4	3	4	3	2	2	2	2	2	2	2	2	2	2	2	2	2	2	2	2	2	2	2	2				

Updated to match(es) played on 7 May 2023. Source: Austrian Football Bundesliga
A = Away; H = Home; W = Win; D = Draw; L = Loss

==== Matches ====
The league fixtures were announced on 22 June 2022.

23 July 2022 1	Wolfsberger AC	1–1	Sturm Graz	Wolfsberg
19:30 CEST (UTC+2)	Kerschbaumer 26'	Report	Sarkaria 43'	Stadium: Lavanttal-Arena; Attendance: 5,400; Referee: Christopher Jäger

30 July 2022 2	Sturm Graz	2–1	Red Bull Salzburg	Graz
19:30 CEST (UTC+2)	Højlund 23', 51'	Report	Kjærgaard 87'	Stadium: Merkur Arena; Attendance: 12,317; Referee: Julian Weinberger

6 August 2022 3	Ried	1–1	Sturm Graz	Ried im Innkreis
17:00 CEST (UTC+2)	Monschein 78' (pen.)	Report	Lang 11'	Stadium: Josko Arena; Attendance: 4,345; Referee: Josef Spurny

13 August 2022 4	Sturm Graz	4–0	Rheindorf Altach	Graz
19:30 CEST (UTC+2)	Højlund 15'; Gorenc Stanković (yellow card) 60'; Affengruber (yellow card) 65'; Emegha 72' 89'; Wels 78'; Gazibegović (yellow card) 82'	Report	Haudum (yellow card) 54'; Reiter (yellow card) 66' (yellow-red card) 66'; Zwischenbrugger (yellow card) 73'; Jäger (yellow card) 73'; Nuhiu (yellow card) 90+2'	Stadium: Merkur Arena; Attendance: 9,584; Referee: (Austria) Gerhard Grobelnik

20 August 2022 5	Sturm Graz	0–1	LASK	Graz
19:30 CEST (UTC+2)	Wüthrich (yellow card) 81'; Schnegg (yellow card) 86'; Gazibegović (yellow card) 90+1'	Report	Nakamura 65'; Schlager (yellow card) 87'; Jovičić (yellow card) 88'	Stadium: Merkur Arena; Attendance: 12,704; Referee: (Austria) Walter Altmann

28 August 2022 6	Rapid Wien	1–2	Sturm Graz	Wien
17:00 CEST (UTC+2)	Kühn 15'; Auer (yellow card) 58'; Koscelník (yellow card) 73'; Moormann (red card) 84'; Wimmer (yellow card) 84'; Zimmermann (yellow card) 90'; Pejić (yellow card) 90+5'	Report	Prass (yellow card) 21'; Wüthrich 24'; Gazibegović (yellow card) 35'; Horvat 86' (pen.)	Stadium: Allianz Stadion; Attendance: 19,180; Referee: (Austria) Christopher Jäeger

3 September 2022 7	Sturm Graz	0–0	Hartberg	Graz
17:00 CEST (UTC+2)	Gazibegović (yellow card) 84'	Report	Horvat (red card) 12'; Heil (yellow card) 80'	Stadium: Merkur Arena; Attendance: 11,427; Referee: (Austria) Julian Weinberger

11 September 2022 8	Austria Klagenfurt	0–2	Sturm Graz	Klagenfurt
17:00 CEST (UTC+2)	Wimmer (yellow card) 45'	Report	Gorenc Stanković (yellow card) 12'; Hierländer (yellow card) 27'; Prass (yellow card) 47'; Ljubic 66'; Emegha 90+4' (yellow card) 90+5'	Stadium: 28 Black Arena; Attendance: 4,653; Referee: (Austria) Manuel Schüttengruber

18 September 2022 9	Sturm Graz	2–0	Austria Lustenau	Graz
14:30 CEST (UTC+2)	Prass 24'; Schnegg (yellow card) 71'; Fuseini 83'	Report	Guenouche (yellow card) 15'; Hugonet (yellow card) 58'; Grabher (yellow card) 73'; Anderson (red card) 89'	Stadium: Merkur Arena; Attendance: 10,237; Referee: (Austria) Markus Hameter

2 October 2022 10	Austria Wien	0–3	Sturm Graz	Wien
17:00 CEST (UTC+2)	Kreiker (yellow card) 63'; Fitz (yellow card) 65'	Report	Ajeti 14'; Bøving 58'; Ljubic (yellow card) 84'; Fuseini 90+2'	Stadium: Generali Arena; Attendance: 13,977; Referee: (Austria) Sebastian Gishamer

9 October 2022 11	Sturm Graz	2–1	WSG Tirol	Graz
14:30 CEST (UTC+2)	Gorenc Stanković 17'; Schnegg 37'; Emegha (yellow card) 61'; Sarkaria (yellow card) 74'	Report	Štumberger (yellow card) 15'; Schulz 20'; Sulzbacher (yellow card) 80'; Behounek (yellow card) 90+7'	Stadium: Merkur Arena; Attendance: 11,004; Referee: (Austria) Arnes Talic

16 October 2022 12	Sturm Graz	3–2	Wolfsberger AC	Graz
14:30 CEST (UTC+2)	Kiteishvili 48'; Borković 51'; Ajeti 54'	Report	Novak (yellow card) 11'; Baribo 25'; Schifferl (yellow card) 55'; Ballo (yellow card) 57'; Veratschnig (yellow card) 61'; Röcher 90'	Stadium: Merkur Arena; Attendance: 11,915; Referee: (Austria) Christopher Jäeger

22 October 2022 13	Red Bull Salzburg	0–0	Sturm Graz	Salzburg
17:00 CEST (UTC+2)	Agyekum (yellow card) 27'; Pavlović (yellow card) 58' (yellow-red card) 90+1'; Kjærgaard (yellow card) 90+3'	Report	Gazibegović (yellow card) 78'; Affengruber (yellow card) 80'; Gorenc Stanković (yellow card) 82'	Stadium: Red Bull Arena; Attendance: 15,527; Referee: (Austria) Stefan Ebner

30 October 2022 14	Sturm Graz	2–1	Ried	Graz
17:00 CEST (UTC+2)	Jantscher 22' (pen.); Kiteishvili 71'	Report	Nutz 59'; Michael Martin (yellow card) 90+1'	Stadium: Merkur Arena; Attendance: 15,023; Referee: (Austria) Harald Lechner

6 November 2022 15	Rheindorf Altach	1–1	Sturm Graz	Altach
14:30 CET (UTC+1)	Nuhiu 15' (yellow card) 79'; Edokpolor (yellow card) 31'	Report	Kiteishvili 11' (pen.); Gazibegović (yellow card) 52'; Schnegg (yellow card) 72'; Ajeti (yellow card) 78'	Stadium: CASHPOINT Arena; Attendance: 7,143; Referee: (Austria) Manuel Schüttengruber

13 November 2022 16	LASK	1–1	Sturm Graz	Pasching
17:00 CET (UTC+1)	Goiginger (yellow card) 26'; Renner 46'; Horvath (yellow card) 68'	Report	Emegha 76'	Stadium: Raiffeisen Arena; Attendance: 5,800; Referee: (Austria) Sebastian Gishamer

10 February 2023 17	Sturm Graz	1–0	Rapid Wien	Graz
20:30 CET (UTC+1)	Borković (yellow card) 37'; Affengruber 90+1'	Report	Pejić (yellow card) 39'; Grüll (yellow card) 52'; Moormann (yellow card) 90'	Stadium: Merkur Arena; Attendance: 15,595; Referee: (Austria) Walter Altmann

18 February 2023 18	Hartberg	1–2	Sturm Graz	Hartberg
17:00 CET (UTC+1)	Rotter (yellow card) 41'; Tadić 75'; Kainz (yellow card) 90+4'	Report	Sarkaria 11' (yellow card) 27'; Horvat 44'; Ljubic (yellow card) 90+2'	Stadium: Profertil Arena; Attendance: 4,700; Referee: (Austria) Dieter Muckenhammer

25 February 2023 19	Sturm Graz	1–2	Austria Klagenfurt	Graz
17:00 CET (UTC+1)	Affengruber 11'	Report	Affengruber 13' (o.g.); Straudi (yellow card) 16'; Pink 54'	Stadium: Merkur Arena; Attendance: 12,025; Referee: (Austria) Alan Kijas

4 March 2023 20	Austria Lustenau	0–2	Sturm Graz	Lustenau
17:00 CET (UTC+1)	Guenouche (yellow card) 83'	Report	Schnegg (yellow card) 49'; Affengruber 51'; Horvat 76'	Stadium: Planet Pure Stadion; Attendance: 4,300; Referee: (Austria) Christopher Jäeger

12 March 2023 21	Sturm Graz	3–1	Austria Wien	Graz
17:00 CET (UTC+1)	Emegha 34' 65'; Sarkaria 71' (pen.)	Report	Tabaković 36'; Ranftl (yellow card) 71'; Braunöder (yellow card) 90+2'	Stadium: Merkur Arena; Attendance: 14,500; Referee: (Austria) Stefan Ebner

19 March 2023 22	WSG Tirol	0–2	Sturm Graz	Innsbruck
17:00 CET (UTC+1)	Prica (yellow card) 8'; Naschberger (yellow card) 69'; Tomic (yellow card) 83'	Report	Bryan Teixeira (yellow card) 59'; Emegha 66'; Ajeti 87'	Stadium: Tivoli Stadion Tirol; Attendance: 3,400; Referee: (Austria) Manuel Schüttengruber

=== Austrian Cup ===
16 July 2022 First round	SC Röfix Röthis	0–6	Sturm Graz	Röthis
10:30 CEST (UTC+2)	Decet (yellow card) 40'; Scheichl (yellow card) 80'; Domig (yellow card) 92'	Report	Højlund 5', 33'; Affengruber 18'; Sarkaria 44', 62'; Kronberger 91'	Stadium: Sportplatz an der Ratz; Attendance: 1,487; Referee: Andreas Heiss

31 August 2022 Second round	Sturm Graz	3–1	Austria Salzburg	Graz
18:00 CEST (UTC+2)	Sarkaria 12' 79' (pen.); Mathias Hausberger 29' (o.g.)	Report	Krainz (yellow card) 5'; Matthias Theiner (yellow card) 14'; Marinko Sorda 72'	Stadium: Merkur-Arena; Attendance: 7,120; Referee: (Austria) Harald Lechner

19 October 2022 Third round	Grazer AK	0–1	Sturm Graz	Graz
18:00 CEST (UTC+2)	Rosenberger (yellow card) 38'; Thorsten Schriebl (yellow card) 43'; Perchtold (yellow card) 71'	Report	Ajeti 65' (yellow card) 68'; Ingolitsch (yellow card) 80'; Gazibegović (yellow card) 83'	Stadium: Merkur-Arena; Attendance: 15,400; Referee: (Austria) Alexander Harkam

3 February 2023 Quarter-finals	Red Bull Salzburg	1–1 (a.e.t.) (4–5 p)	Sturm Graz	Salzburg
20:45 CEST (UTC+2)	Solet (yellow card) 30'; Capaldo (yellow card) 62'; Dedić (yellow card) 74' (goal) 76'	Report	Gazibegović 37'; Gorenc Stanković (yellow card) 90+4'	Stadium: Red Bull Arena; Attendance: 9,300; Referee: (Austria) Julian Weinberger

6 April 2023 Semi-finals	Sturm Graz	–	LASK	Graz
20:30 CEST (UTC+2)				Stadium: Merkur-Arena

=== UEFA Champions League ===
==== Third qualifying round ====
The draw for the third qualifying round was held on 18 July 2022.

3 August 2022 First leg	Dynamo Kyiv (Ukraine)	1–0	(Austria) Sturm Graz	Łódź, Poland
20:00 CEST (UTC+2)	Karavayev 28'	Report		Stadium: Stadion Miejski im. Władysława Króla; Attendance: 6,092; Referee: François Letexier (France)

9 August 2022 Second leg	Sturm Graz (Austria)	1–2 (a.e.t.) (1–3 agg.)	(Ukraine) Dynamo Kyiv	Graz
20:30 CEST (UTC+2)	Højlund 27'	Report	Vivcharenko 97'; Tsyhankov 112'	Stadium: Liebenauer Stadium; Attendance: 14,007; Referee: Ivan Kružliak (Slovakia)

=== UEFA Europa League ===
==== Group stage ====
The draw for the group stage was held on 26 August 2022.

Pos	Team	Pld	W	D	L	GF	GA	GD	Pts	Qualification	FEY	MID	LAZ	STU
1	(Netherlands) Feyenoord	6	2	2	2	13	9	+4	8 (Note: Tied on head-to-head results. Overall goal difference is used as the tiebreaker. Between Feyenoord and Midtjylland, overall goals scored is used as the tiebreaker.)	Advance to round of 16	—	2–2	1–0	6–0
2	(Denmark) Midtjylland	6	2	2	2	12	8	+4	8	Advance to knockout round play-offs	2–2	—	5–1	2–0
3	(Italy) Lazio	6	2	2	2	9	11	−2	8	Transfer to Europa Conference League	4–2	2–1	—	2–2
4	(Austria) Sturm Graz	6	2	2	2	4	10	−6	8		1–0	1–0	0–0	—

Source: UEFA
Rules for classification: Group stage tiebreakers
Notes:

8 September 2022 1	Sturm Graz (Austria)	1–0	(Denmark) Midtjylland	Graz
21:00 CEST (UTC+2)	Emegha 8'	Report		Stadium: Liebenauer Stadium; Attendance: 10,521; Referee: Aliyar Aghayev (Azerbaijan)

15 September 2022 2	Feyenoord (Netherlands)	6–0	(Austria) Sturm Graz	Rotterdam, Netherlands
18:45 CEST (UTC+2)	Jahanbakhsh 9', 41'; Hancko 31'; Danilo 34'; Giménez 66'; Idrissi 78'	Report		Stadium: De Kuip; Attendance: 30,025; Referee: Jérôme Brisard (France)

6 October 2022 3	Sturm Graz (Austria)	0–0	(Italy) Lazio	Graz
18:45 CEST (UTC+2)		Report		Stadium: Liebenauer Stadium; Attendance: 14,171; Referee: Benoît Bastien (France)

13 October 2022 4	Lazio (Italy)	2–2	(Austria) Sturm Graz	Rome, Italy
21:00 CEST (UTC+2)	Immobile 45' (pen.); Pedro 71'	Report	Bøving 56', 83'	Stadium: Stadio Olimpico; Attendance: 21,059; Referee: Sascha Stegemann (Germany)

27 October 2022 5	Sturm Graz (Austria)	1–0	(Netherlands) Feyenoord	Graz
21:00 CEST (UTC+2)	Kiteishvili 90+3'	Report		Stadium: Liebenauer Stadium; Attendance: 13,987; Referee: Espen Eskås (Norway)

3 November 2022 6	Midtjylland (Denmark)	2–0	(Austria) Sturm Graz	Herning, Denmark
18:45 CET (UTC+1)	Dreyer 15', 72'	Report		Stadium: MCH Arena; Attendance: 9,134; Referee: Matej Jug (Slovenia)
