= 2021–22 SK Sturm Graz season =

Sturm Graz
2021–22 season
- Chairman: Christian Jauk
- Manager: Christian Ilzer
- Stadium: Merkur-Arena
- Austrian Bundesliga: 2nd
- Austrian Cup: Third round
- UEFA Europa League: Group stage
- Top goalscorer: League: Manprit Sarkaria (13 goals); All: Jakob Jantscher; Manprit Sarkaria (17 each)
Home colours	Away colours	Third colours

The 2021–22 season was the 113th season in the existence of SK Sturm Graz and the club's 56th consecutive season in the top flight of Austrian football. In addition to the domestic league, Sturm Graz participated in this season's edition of the Austrian Cup and the UEFA Europa League.

== Players ==
=== First-team squad ===
As of 29 January 2022

Note: Flags indicate national team as defined under FIFA eligibility rules; some limited exceptions apply. Players may hold more than one non-FIFA nationality.

No.	Pos.	Nation	Player
4	DF	SLO	Jon Gorenc Stanković
5	DF	SUI	Gregory Wüthrich
6	DF	AUT	Aleksandar Borković (on loan from Hoffenheim)
8	MF	AUT	Alexander Prass
9	FW	DEN	Rasmus Højlund
10	MF	GEO	Otar Kiteishvili
11	MF	AUT	Manprit Sarkaria
13	FW	AUT	Jakob Jantscher
14	DF	AUT	Paul Komposch
15	FW	CIV	Anderson Niangbo (on loan from Gent)
16	MF	AUT	Sandro Schendl
17	MF	AUT	Lukas Jäger
18	MF	AUT	Philipp Huspek
19	MF	AUT	Andreas Kuen
20	FW	AUT	Martin Krienzer

No.	Pos.	Nation	Player
21	MF	AUT	Samuel Stückler
22	DF	BIH	Jusuf Gazibegović
23	FW	AUT	Luca Kronberger
24	DF	AUT	Sandro Ingolitsch
25	MF	AUT	Stefan Hierländer
26	MF	AUT	Christoph Lang
27	GK	AUT	Jörg Siebenhandl
29	FW	ZAM	Francisco Mwepu
30	MF	AUT	Ivan Ljubić
32	GK	AUT	Tobias Schützenauer
35	DF	AUT	Niklas Geyrhofer
36	DF	AUT	Vincent Trummer
42	DF	AUT	David Affengruber
44	DF	MLI	Amadou Dante

=== Out on loan ===
Note: Flags indicate national team as defined under FIFA eligibility rules; some limited exceptions apply. Players may hold more than one non-FIFA nationality.

No.	Pos.	Nation	Player
—	GK	AUT	Christopher Giuliani (at Kapfenberg until 30 June 2022)
—	DF	AUT	Florian Weiler (at Hartberg until 30 June 2022)

No.	Pos.	Nation	Player
—	MF	AUT	Dardan Shabanhaxhaj (at Kapfenberg until 30 June 2022)

== Transfers ==
=== Out ===
No.	Pos.	Player	Transferred to	Fee	Date	Source
45	FW	(Italy) Kelvin Yeboah	(Italy) Genoa	€6.5M	8 January 2022	

== Pre-season and friendlies ==
Win Draw Loss Fixtures

25 June 2021 Friendly	Sturm Graz	6–0	FC Juniors OÖ	Oberaich, Austria
17:00 CEST (UTC+2)				Stadium: Oberaicher Sportanlage

2 July 2021 Friendly	Sturm Graz	9–1	FC Liefering	Schladming, Austria
15:00 CEST (UTC+2)				Stadium: Stadion Schladming

2 July 2021 Friendly	Sturm Graz	1–3	FC Blau-Weiß Linz	Schladming, Austria
17:30 CEST (UTC+2)				Stadium: Stadion Schladming

8 July 2021 Friendly	Sturm Graz	0–1	Cracovia	Moravske Toplice, Slovenia
17:30 CEST (UTC+2)				Stadium: Moravski Stadion

8 July 2021 Friendly	Sturm Graz	1–1	Red Star Belgrade	Graz, Austria
20:30 CEST (UTC+2)				Stadium: Merkur-Arena

28 July 2021 Friendly	Udinese	2–3	Sturm Graz	Sankt Veit an der Glan, Austria
18:00 CEST (UTC+2)	Pussetto 45'; Forestieri 57'	Report	Kiteishvili 9'; Yeboah 39'; Kuen 81' (pen.)	Stadium: Jacques Lemans Arena

3 September 2021 Friendly	Sturm Graz	1–1	Bravo	Lebring, Austria
16:00 CEST (UTC+2)				Stadium: sanSirro Stadion Lebring

29 January 2022 Friendly	Gorica	0–1	Sturm Graz	Čatež ob Savi, Slovenia
14:30 CET (UTC+1)				Stadium: Sportski Centar Terme Čatež

24 March 2022 Friendly	Sturm Graz	3–2	Kapfenberger SV	Austria
15:00 CET (UTC+1)

== Competitions ==
=== Overall record ===
Competition	First match	Last match	Starting round	Final position	Record							
Competition	First match	Last match	Starting round	Final position	Pld	W	D	L	GF	GA	GD	Win %
Austrian Football Bundesliga	23 July 2021	May 2022	Matchday 1		28	14	8	6	55	36	+19	50.00
Austrian Cup	17 July 2021	27 October 2021	First round	Third round	3	2	0	1	14	2	+12	66.67
UEFA Europa League	19 August 2021	9 December 2021	Play-off round	Group stage	8	2	2	4	8	11	−3	25.00
Total					39	18	10	11	77	49	+28	46.15

Last updated: 24 April 2022
Source: Soccerway

=== Austrian Football Bundesliga ===
==== Regular stage ====
Austrian Bundesliga regular season table
Pos	Team	Pld	W	D	L	GF	GA	GD	Pts	Qualification
1	Red Bull Salzburg	22	17	4	1	50	13	+37	55	Qualification for the Championship round
2	Sturm Graz	22	10	7	5	46	32	+14	37	Qualification for the Championship round
3	Wolfsberger AC	22	11	4	7	34	32	+2	37	Qualification for the Championship round
4	Austria Wien	22	8	9	5	31	23	+8	33	Qualification for the Championship round
5	Rapid Wien	22	8	7	7	35	31	+4	31	Qualification for the Championship round

Source: Austrian Football Bundesliga
Rules for classification: 1) Points; 2) Head-to-head record; 3) Goal difference; 4) Goals scored; 5) Matches won; 6) Away matches won; 7) Away goals scored.

==== Results summary ====
Overall								Home						Away					
Pld	W	D	L	GF	GA	GD	Pts	W	D	L	GF	GA	GD	W	D	L	GF	GA	GD
31	16	8	7	60	42	+18	56	9	4	3	32	23	+9	7	4	4	28	19	+9

Last updated: 15 May 2022.
Source: Austrian Football Bundesliga

==== Results by round ====
Round	1	2	3	4	5	6	7	8	9	10	11	12	13	14	15	16	17	18	19	20	21	22	23	24	25	26	27	28	29	30	31	32
Ground	H	A	H	A	H	A	H	H	A	A	H	A	H	H	A	A	H	A	A	H	H	A	A	H	A	H	H	A	H	A	H	A
Result	L	W	W	W	D	D	W	W	W	L	W	L	L	D	L	W	D	W	D	D	W	D	L	W	W	W	W	D	W	W	L	
Position	11	4	2	2	2	2	2	2	2	2	2	2	2	2	2	2	2	2	2	2	2	2	2	2	2	2	2	2	2	2	2	

Updated to match(es) played on 15 May 2022. Source: Austrian Football Bundesliga
A = Away; H = Home; W = Win; D = Draw; L = Loss

==== Matches ====
The league fixtures were announced on 22 June 2021.

23 July 2021 1	Sturm Graz	1–3	Red Bull Salzburg	Graz
20:30 CEST (UTC+2)	Ulmer 11' (o.g.); Prass (yellow card) 71'	Report	Capaldo (yellow card) 45+1'; Adeyemi 69', 85'; Kristensen 76'; Seiwald (yellow card) 81'	Stadium: Merkur-Arena; Attendance: 13,066; Referee: Walter Altmann

1 August 2021 2	Wolfsberger AC	1–4	Sturm Graz	Wolfsberg
17:00 CEST (UTC+2)	Baumgartner 15' (yellow card) 59'; Baribo (yellow card) 26'; Gugganig (yellow card) 90+2'	Report	Wüthrich 25'; Kiteishvili 31'; Jantscher 32'; Affengruber 37'; Prass (yellow card) 75'	Stadium: Lavanttal-Arena; Attendance: 4,409; Referee: (Austria) Harald Lechner

7 August 2021 3	Sturm Graz	3–1	Rheindorf Altach	Graz
17:00 CEST (UTC+2)	Stanković 17'; Yeboah 59' 79' (pen.)	Report	Haudum 49'; Zwischenbrugger (yellow card) 53'; Strauß (yellow card) 87'	Stadium: Merkur-Arena; Attendance: 9,454; Referee: (Austria) Dieter Muckenhammer

15 August 2021 4	LASK	1–3	Sturm Graz	Pasching
17:00 CEST (UTC+2)	Wiesinger (yellow card) 7'; Grgić (yellow card) 51'; Michorl (yellow card) 76' (goal) 85'	Report	Gazibegović (yellow card) 19'; Kiteishvili (yellow card) 64'; Yeboah 66'; Stanković (yellow card) 75'; Sarkaria 83' 90+4'	Stadium: Raiffeisen Arena; Attendance: 5,368; Referee: (Austria) Gerhard Grobelnik

22 August 2021 5	Sturm Graz	2–2	Austria Wien	Graz
17:00 CEST (UTC+2)	Sarkaria 47'; Yeboah 51'; Stanković (yellow card) 55'; Kiteishvili (yellow card) 88'	Report	Pichler (yellow card) 14'; Djuricin 19' (pen.) 69'; Martel (yellow card) 20'; Handl (yellow card) 43'	Stadium: Merkur-Arena; Attendance: 12,474; Referee: (Austria) Sebastian Gishamer

29 August 2021 6	Admira	1–1	Sturm Graz	Maria Enzersdorf
17:00 CEST (UTC+2)	Kronberger (yellow card) 21'; Kerschbaum 70'; Lukačević (yellow card) 90+4'; Zwierschitz (yellow card) 90+4'	Report	Ljubic (yellow card) 19'; Sarkaria 35'; Jäger (yellow card) 52'; Hierländer (yellow card) 82'; Yeboah (yellow card) 90+4'	Stadium: BSFZ-Arena; Attendance: 2,590; Referee: (Austria) Dieter Muckenhammer

12 September 2021 7	Sturm Graz	2–1	Austria Klagenfurt	Graz
17:00 CEST (UTC+2)	Jantscher 31' (pen.); Ljubic (yellow card) 45+1'; Wüthrich 90+4' (yellow card) 90+5'	Report	Cvetko 3'; Rieder (yellow card) 51'; Nicolas Wimmer (yellow card) 64'; Gemicibaşi (yellow card) 81'	Stadium: Merkur-Arena; Attendance: 8,834; Referee: (Austria) Walter Altmann

19 September 2021 8	Sturm Graz	5–0	WSG Tirol	Graz
14:30 CEST (UTC+2)	Jantscher 25' 45+3'; Yeboah (yellow card) 45' (goal) 48' (pen.) 69'; Kuen (yellow card) 54'; Geyrhofer (yellow card) 83'; Niangbo 85'	Report		Stadium: Merkur-Arena; Attendance: 8,844; Referee: (Austria) Harald Lechner

26 September 2021 9	Rapid Wien	0–3	Sturm Graz	Vienna
17:00 CEST (UTC+2)	Stojković (yellow card) 33'; Greiml (yellow card) 59'	Report	Yeboah 38' (yellow card) 66'; Stanković (yellow card) 52' (goal) 71'; Dante (yellow card) 59'; Affengruber (yellow card) 79'; Ljubic 82'	Stadium: Allianz Stadion; Attendance: 16,228; Referee: (Austria) Sebastian Gishamer

3 October 2021 10	Hartberg	3–2	Sturm Graz	Hartberg
14:30 CEST (UTC+2)	Horvat 19'; Niemann 21'; Heil (yellow card) 47'; Sturm 81'	Report	Jantscher 48' (pen.); Niangbo 87'	Stadium: Profertil Arena Hartberg; Attendance: 4,631; Referee: (Austria) Manuel Schüttengruber

17 October 2021 11	Sturm Graz	1–0	Ried	Graz
17:00 CEST (UTC+2)	Jantscher 32'; Gazibegović (yellow card) 44'; Geyrhofer (yellow card) 85'	Report	Reiner (yellow card) 59'; Ante Bajic (yellow card) 90+6'	Stadium: Merkur-Arena; Attendance: 8,699; Referee: (Austria) Christopher Jäger

24 October 2021 12	Salzburg	4–1	Sturm Graz	Wals-Siezenheim
17:00 CEST (UTC+2)	Kristensen 5'; Adeyemi 22' (yellow card) 28' (goal) 81'; Ulmer (yellow card) 57'; Siebenhandl 74' (o.g.)	Report	Jantscher 50'; Gazibegović (yellow card) 88'	Stadium: Red Bull Arena; Attendance: 16,512; Referee: (Austria) Manuel Schüttengruber

31 October 2021 13	Sturm Graz	0–3	Wolfsberger AC	Graz
14:30 CEST (UTC+2)		Report	Lochoshvili (yellow card) 6'; Liendl 16'; Baumgartner (yellow card) 61'; Dante 64' (o.g.); Jasic (yellow card) 78'; Dieng 90+4'	Stadium: Merkur-Arena; Attendance: 10,615; Referee: (Austria) Markus Hameter

21 November 2021 15	Sturm Graz	3–3	LASK	Graz
17:00 CET (UTC+1)	Gazibegović (yellow card) 21'; Yeboah 44' 80' (yellow card) 90+1'; Affengruber (yellow card) 56'; Sarkaria 64'	Report	Horvath (yellow card) 15' (goal) 36'; Grgić (yellow card) 21' (goal) 26'; Renner (yellow card) 28' (yellow-red card) 79'; Karamoko 32'; Boller (yellow card) 63'	Stadium: Merkur-Arena; Attendance: 7,404; Referee: (Austria) Sebastian Gishamer

28 November 2021 16	Austria Wien	2–1	Sturm Graz	Wien
14:30 CET (UTC+1)	Demaku (yellow card) 19'; Jukic (yellow card) 41' (goal) 76'; Huskovic 48'; Schoissengeyr (yellow card) 87'	Report	Kuen (red card) 58'; Sarkaria 81'	Stadium: Generali Arena; Attendance: 0 Referee: (Austria) Manuel Schüttengruber

1 December 2021 14	Rheindorf Altach	0–1	Sturm Graz	Altach
19:00 CET (UTC+1)		Report	Gazibegović (yellow card) 18'; Sarkaria 37'	Stadium: CASHPOINT Arena; Attendance: 0 Referee: (Austria) Alan Kijas

4 December 2021 17	Sturm Graz	1–1	Admira	Graz
17:00 CET (UTC+1)	Wüthrich (yellow card) 7'; Jantscher 13'; Jäger (yellow card) 59'	Report	Ganda (yellow card) 9'; Vorsager 38'; Datković (yellow card) 45+1'; Kronberger (yellow card) 73'	Stadium: Merkur-Arena; Attendance: 0 Referee: (Austria) Julian Weinberger

==== Championship round ====
Pos	Team	Pld	W	D	L	GF	GA	GD	Pts	Qualification	RBS	STU	AWI	WOL	RWI	KLA
1	Red Bull Salzburg (C)	32	25	5	2	77	19	+58	52	Qualification for the Champions League group stage	—	1–0	5–0	4–0	2–1	1–1
2	Sturm Graz	32	16	8	8	62	46	+16	37	Qualification for the Champions League third qualifying round	2–1	—	1–0	1–4	2–1	3–1
3	Austria Wien	32	11	13	8	44	39	+5	29	Qualification for the Europa League play-off round	1–2	4–2	—	2–1	1–1	1–1
4	Wolfsberger AC	32	14	5	13	48	53	−5	28	Qualification for the Europa Conference League third qualifying round	1–4	0–2	1–1	—	2–1	1–2
5	Rapid Wien (O)	32	10	11	11	48	45	+3	25	Qualification for the Europa Conference League play-offs	0–1	1–1	1–1	2–1	—	2–2

Legend: Blue = home team win; Yellow = draw; Red = away team win.
Rules for classification: 1) Points; 2) Points with (possible) half points subtracted due to rounding; 3) Head-to-head points; 4) Head-to-head goal difference; 5) Head-to-head goals scored; 6) Head-to-head away goals scored; 7) Goal difference; 8) Goals scored; 9) Matches won; 10) Away matches won; 11) Away goals scored.
(C) Champions; (O) Play-off winners

=== Austrian Cup ===
17 July 2021 First round	Stadl-Paura	0–9	Sturm Graz	Stadl-Paura
17:30 CEST (UTC+2)	Stajev (yellow card) 58'; Oduh (yellow card) 63'	Report	Kiteishvili 18'; Kuen 34', 45'; Sarkaria 37', 44', 50'; Yeboah 38'; Jantscher 41'; Stanković (yellow card) 80'; Lang 86'	Stadium: Licht & Planung Arena Stadl-Paura; Referee: Thomas Fröhlacher

22 September 2021 Second round	World of Jobs VFB Hohenems	0–4	Sturm Graz	Graz
17:30		Report	Sarkaria 7'; Geyrhofer 58'; Affengruber 67'; Yeboah 90+1'	Stadium: Liebenauer Stadium; Attendance: 1,300; Referee: Andreas Heiß

27 October 2021 Third round	Sturm Graz	1–2	SV Ried	Graz
18:00	Jantscher 69'	Report	Bajic 36'; Meisl 52'	Stadium: Merkur-Arena; Attendance: 5,528; Referee: Sebastian Gishamer

=== UEFA Europa League ===
==== Play-off round ====
The draw for the play-off round was held on 2 August 2021.

19 August 2021 First leg	Mura (Slovenia)	1–3	(Austria) Sturm Graz	Murska Sobota, Slovenia
20:00 CEST (UTC+2)	Škoflek 3'; Šturm (yellow card) 23'	Report	Jantscher 18' (pen.); Stanković (yellow card) 34'; Kiteishvili 60'; Yeboah 63'	Stadium: Fazanerija; Referee: Michael Oliver (England)

26 August 2021 Second leg	Sturm Graz (Austria)	2–0 (5–1 agg.)	(Slovenia) Mura	Graz, Austria
21:00 CEST (UTC+2)	Kiteishvili 39'; Jantscher 66'	Report		Stadium: Liebenauer Stadium; Referee: José María Sánchez (Spain)

==== Group stage ====
The draw for the group stage was held on 27 August 2021.

Pos	Team	Pld	W	D	L	GF	GA	GD	Pts	Qualification
1	(France) Monaco	6	3	3	0	7	4	+3	12	Advance to round of 16
2	(Spain) Real Sociedad	6	2	3	1	9	6	+3	9	Advance to knockout round play-offs
3	(Netherlands) PSV Eindhoven	6	2	2	2	9	8	+1	8	Transfer to Europa Conference League
4	(Austria) Sturm Graz	6	0	2	4	3	10	−7	2	

Source: UEFA
Rules for classification: Group stage tiebreakers

16 September 2021 1	Monaco (France)	1–0	(Austria) Sturm Graz	Monaco, France
21:00 CEST (UTC+2)	Jakobs (yellow card) 32'; Diatta 66'	Report	Wüthrich (yellow card) 64'; Prass (yellow card) 90+4'	Stadium: Stade Louis II; Attendance: 2,941; Referee: Donatas Rumšas (Lithuania)

30 September 2021 2	Sturm Graz (Austria)	1–4	(Netherlands) PSV	Graz, Austria
18:45 CEST (UTC+2)	Kiteishvili (yellow card) 30'; Gazibegović (yellow card) 47'; Stanković 55', (yellow card) 57'	Report	Sangaré 32', (yellow card) 57' (yellow-red card) 89'; Boscagli (yellow card) 50'; Zahavi 51'; Gakpo (yellow card) 64'; Max 74'; Vertessen 78'	Stadium: Liebenauer Stadium; Attendance: 15,026; Referee: Yevhen Aranovskyi (Ukraine)

21 October 2021 3	Sturm Graz (Austria)	0–1	(Spain) Real Sociedad	Graz, Austria
21:00 CEST (UTC+2)	Stanković (yellow card) 59' (yellow-red card) 87'	Report	Gorosabel (yellow card) 24'; Merino (yellow card) 26'; Zubeldia (yellow card) 60'; Guevara (yellow card) 65'; Isak 69'	Stadium: Liebenauer Stadium; Attendance: 14,809; Referee: Tobias Stieler (Germany)

4 November 2021 4	Real Sociedad (Spain)	1–1	(Austria) Sturm Graz	San Sebastián, Spain
18:45 CET (UTC+1)	Sørloth 53'; Zubimendi (yellow card) 74'	Report	Jantscher 38'; Wüthrich (yellow card) 58'; Kuen (yellow card) 78'; Siebenhandl (yellow card) 90+1'	Stadium: Anoeta; Attendance: 25,010; Referee: Andris Treimanis (Latvia)

25 November 2021 5	PSV (Netherlands)	2–0	(Austria) Sturm Graz	Eindhoven, Netherlands
21:00 CET (UTC+1)	Vinícius 45' (pen.); Bruma 56'	Report		Stadium: Philips Stadion; Attendance: 0 Referee: Paweł Raczkowski (Poland)

9 December 2021 6	Sturm Graz (Austria)	1–1	(France) Monaco	Graz, Austria
18:45 CET (UTC+1)	Jantscher 7' (pen.)	Report	Volland 30'	Stadium: Liebenauer Stadium; Referee: Mohammed Al-Hakim (Sweden)
