= 2020–21 SK Sturm Graz season =

Sturm Graz
2020–21 season
- Chairman: Christian Jauk
- Manager: Christian Ilzer
- Stadium: Merkur-Arena
- Austrian Bundesliga: 3rd
- Austrian Cup: Semi-finals
Home colours	Away colours	Third colours
- All statistics correct as of 22 May 2021.

The 2020–21 SK Sturm Graz season was the club's 112th season in existence and the 55th consecutive season in the top flight of Austrian football. In addition to the domestic league, Sturm Graz participated in this season's edition of the Austrian Cup. The season covered the period from 6 July 2020 to 30 June 2021.

== Players ==
=== First-team squad ===
As of 7 February 2021

Note: Flags indicate national team as defined under FIFA eligibility rules; some limited exceptions apply. Players may hold more than one non-FIFA nationality.

No.	Pos.	Nation	Player
4	DF	SLO	Jon Gorenc Stanković
5	DF	SUI	Gregory Wüthrich
6	DF	AUT	David Nemeth (on loan from Mainz 05 II)
9	FW	ALB	Bekim Balaj
10	MF	GEO	Otar Kiteishvili
11	DF	BIH	Jusuf Gazibegović
13	MF	AUT	Jakob Jantscher
14	DF	AUT	Paul Komposch
15	MF	AUT	Sebastian Zettl
17	MF	AUT	Lukas Jäger
18	MF	AUT	Philipp Huspek
19	MF	AUT	Andreas Kuen

No.	Pos.	Nation	Player
20	FW	AUT	Kevin Friesenbichler
23	FW	GHA	Kelvin Yeboah
24	DF	AUT	Sandro Ingolitsch
25	MF	AUT	Stefan Hierländer
26	MF	AUT	Christoph Lang
27	GK	AUT	Jörg Siebenhandl
29	FW	ZAM	Francisco Mwepu
30	MF	AUT	Ivan Ljubić
32	GK	AUT	Tobias Schützenauer
33	MF	KOS	Dardan Shabanhaxhaj
35	DF	AUT	Niklas Geyrhofer
36	DF	AUT	Vincent Trummer
44	DF	MLI	Amadou Dante

=== Out on loan ===
Note: Flags indicate national team as defined under FIFA eligibility rules; some limited exceptions apply. Players may hold more than one non-FIFA nationality.

No.	Pos.	Nation	Player
—	GK	AUT	Christopher Giuliani (at Kapfenberg until 30 June 2021)
—	FW	AUT	Oliver Bacher (at Kapfenberg until 30 June 2021)

No.	Pos.	Nation	Player
—	MF	AUT	Winfred Amoah (at Kapfenberg until 30 June 2021)

== Pre-season and friendlies ==
Win Draw Loss Fixtures

8 August 2020 Friendly	Sturm Graz	0–1	Ferencváros	Frauenkirchen, Austria
17:00 CEST (UTC+2)		Report		Stadium: Sportplatz Frauenkirchen

12 August 2020 Friendly	Sturm Graz	2–1	Bravo	Bad Waltersdorf, Austria
11:00 CEST (UTC+2)		Report		Stadium: Thermenstadion

15 August 2020 Friendly	Sturm Graz	1–1	Opava	Dietersdorf bei Fürstenfeld, Austria
16:00 CEST (UTC+2)		Report		Stadium: Sportplatz Dietersdorf

22 August 2020 Friendly	Sturm Graz	2–1	Lafnitz	Lebring, Austria
17:00 CEST (UTC+2)		Report		Stadium: Greenhouse Stadion Lebring

5 September 2020 Friendly	Sturm Graz	5–0	Kapfenberger SV	Graz, Austria
14:30 CEST (UTC+2)		Report		Stadium: Messendorf Trainingszentrum

10 October 2020 Friendly	Maribor	0–3	Sturm Graz	Maribor, Slovenia
17:00 CEST (UTC+2)		Report		Stadium: Ljudski vrt

13 November 2020 Friendly	Juniors OÖ	0–1	Sturm Graz	Pasching, Austria
15:30 CET (UTC+1)		Report		Stadium: Raiffeisen Arena

9 January 2021 Friendly	Osijek	2–3	Sturm Graz	Rovinj, Croatia
14:30 CET (UTC+1)		Report		Stadium: Stadion Valbruna

10 January 2021 Friendly	Fehérvár	1–3	Sturm Graz	Poreč, Hungary
15:00 CET (UTC+1)				Stadium: Stadion Veli Jože

18 January 2021 Friendly	Sturm Graz	3–0	Kapfenberger SV	Graz, Austria
11:00 CET (UTC+1)				Stadium: Messendorf Trainingszentrum

15 February 2021 Friendly	Sturm Graz	2–1	Hartberg	Graz, Austria
11:00 CET (UTC+1)				Stadium: Messendorf Trainingszentrum

15 March 2021 Friendly	Sturm Graz	2–1	Hartberg	Graz, Austria
15:00 CET (UTC+1)				Stadium: Messendorf Trainingszentrum

26 March 2021 Friendly	Sturm Graz	2–0	Austria Klagenfurt	Graz, Austria
14:00 CET (UTC+1)	Friesenbichler 65'; Lang 72'			Stadium: Messendorf Trainingszentrum; Attendance: 0

== Competitions ==
=== Overview ===
Competition	First match	Last match	Starting round	Final position	Record							
Competition	First match	Last match	Starting round	Final position	Pld	W	D	L	GF	GA	GD	Win %
Austrian Football Bundesliga	13 September 2020	22 May 2021	Matchday 1	3rd	32	16	8	8	52	34	+18	50.00
Austrian Cup	28 August 2020	3 March 2021	First round	Semi-finals	5	4	0	1	12	5	+7	80.00
Total					37	20	8	9	64	39	+25	54.05

Last updated: 22 May 2021
Source: Soccerway

=== Austrian Bundesliga ===
==== Regular stage ====
Pos	Team	Pld	W	D	L	GF	GA	GD	Pts	Qualification
2	Rapid Wien	22	13	6	3	43	25	+18	45	Qualification for the Championship round
3	LASK	22	13	3	6	42	21	+21	42	Qualification for the Championship round
4	Sturm Graz	22	11	6	5	34	20	+14	39	Qualification for the Championship round
5	Wolfsberger AC	22	10	3	9	40	39	+1	33	Qualification for the Championship round
6	WSG Tirol	22	8	6	8	37	34	+3	30	Qualification for the Championship round

Source: Austrian Football Bundesliga
Rules for classification: 1) Points; 2) Goal difference; 3) Goals scored; 4) Matches won; 5) Away matches won; 6) Head-to-head points; 7) Head-to-head goal difference; 8) Head-to-head goals scored.

==== Results summary ====
Overall								Home						Away					
Pld	W	D	L	GF	GA	GD	Pts	W	D	L	GF	GA	GD	W	D	L	GF	GA	GD
22	11	6	5	34	20	+14	39	8	1	2	21	9	+12	3	5	3	13	11	+2

Last updated: 21 March 2021.
Source: Austrian Football Bundesliga

==== Results by round ====
Round	1	2	3	4	5	6	7	8	9	10	11	12	13	14	15	16	17	18	19	20	21	22
Ground	A	H	A	H	A	H	A	A	H	A	H	H	A	H	A	H	A	H	H	A	H	A
Result	D	D	D	W	W	L	D	W	W	W	W	W	L	W	L	W	L	L	W	D	W	D
Position	7	8	7	6	4	5	5	4	4	4	3	2	3	3	3	3	4	4	4	4	4	4

Updated to match(es) played on 21 March 2021. Source: Austrian Football Bundesliga
A = Away; H = Home; W = Win; D = Draw; L = Loss

==== Matches ====
The league fixtures were announced on 9 July 2020.

13 September 2020 1	St. Pölten	0–0	Sturm Graz	Sankt Pölten
14:30 CEST (UTC+2)	Luxbacher (yellow card) 7'; Pokorný (yellow card) 37'; Schmidt (yellow card) 62'; Schütz (yellow card) 64'	Report	Wüthrich (yellow card) 38'; Friesenbichler (yellow card) 76'; Jäger (yellow card) 82'	Stadium: NV Arena; Attendance: 1,252; Referee: Andreas Heiß

19 September 2020 2	Sturm Graz	1–1	Rapid Wien	Graz
17:00 CEST (UTC+2)	Stanković 52'	Report	Demir 68'	Stadium: Merkur-Arena; Attendance: 3,000; Referee: Walter Altmann

27 September 2020 3	Hartberg	1–1	Sturm Graz	Hartberg
14:30 CEST (UTC+2)	Tadić 90+3'	Report	Ljubic 31'	Stadium: Profertil Arena Hartberg; Attendance: 1,500; Referee: Manuel Schüttengruber

4 October 2020 4	Sturm Graz	4–0	Rheindorf Altach	Graz
14:30 CEST (UTC+2)	Ljubic 9'; Friesenbichler 17'; Kiteishvili 41'; Jantscher 54'	Report		Stadium: Merkur-Arena; Attendance: 3,000; Referee: Christopher Jäger

24 October 2020 5	Ried	0–2	Sturm Graz	Ried im Innkreis
17:00 CEST (UTC+2)		Report	Hierländer 10'; Ljubic 78'	Stadium: Keine Sorgen Arena; Attendance: 1,500; Referee: Harald Lechner

1 November 2020 6	Sturm Graz	0–2	LASK	Graz
17:00 CET (UTC+1)		Report	Balić 6'; Eggestein 90+3'	Stadium: Merkur-Arena; Attendance: 0 Referee: Julian Weinberger

21 November 2020 8	Red Bull Salzburg	1–3	Sturm Graz	Wals-Siezenheim
17:00 CET (UTC+01)	Camara (yellow card) 65'; Berisha 86'	Report	Ljubic 48', (yellow card) 90'; Jantscher 53', 59'; Stanković (yellow card) 65'; Hierländer (yellow card) 90+1'	Stadium: Stadion Wals-Siezenheim; Attendance: 0 Referee: Josef Spurny

28 November 2020 9	Sturm Graz	1–0	WSG Tirol	Graz
17:00 CET (UTC+01)	Balaj 78'	Report		Stadium: Merkur-Arena; Attendance: 0 Referee: Dieter Muckenhammer

5 December 2020 10	Austria Wien	0–4	Sturm Graz	Vienna
17:00 CET (UTC+01)		Report	Nemeth 40'; Kiteishvili 70', 74'; Balaj 90+3'	Stadium: Generali Arena; Attendance: 0 Referee: Christopher Jäger

12 December 2020 11	Sturm Graz	3–0	Admira Wacker Mödling	Graz
17:00 CET (UTC+01)	Stanković 43'; Friesenbichler 58'; Wüthrich 90+3'	Report		Stadium: Merkur-Arena; Attendance: 0 Referee: Josef Spurny

19 December 2020 12	Sturm Graz	3–0	St. Pölten	Graz
17:00 CET (UTC+01)	Jantscher 21'; Friesenbichler 70'; Balaj 77'	Report		Stadium: Merkur-Arena; Attendance: 0 Referee: Stefan Ebner

17 January 2021 7	Wolfsberger AC	0–0	Sturm Graz	Wolfsberg
17:00 CET (UTC+1)		Report		Stadium: Lavanttal-Arena; Attendance: 0 Referee: Markus Hameter

22 January 2021 13	Rapid Wien	4–1	Sturm Graz	Vienna
19:00 CET (UTC+1)	Kara 7'; Schick 43'; Knasmüllner 50'; Demir 88'	Report	Jantscher 31'	Stadium: Allianz Stadion; Attendance: 0 Referee: Dieter Muckenhammer

26 January 2021 14	Sturm Graz	2–1	Hartberg	Graz
18:30 CET (UTC+1)	Kiteishvili 22'; Jantscher 25'	Report	Kainz 58'	Stadium: Merkur-Arena; Attendance: 0 Referee: Julian Weinberger

30 January 2021 15	Rheindorf Altach	2–1	Sturm Graz	Altach
17:00 CET (UTC+1)	Netzer 35'; Fischer 45+1'	Report	Kuen 21'	Stadium: Stadion Schnabelholz; Attendance: 0 Referee: Stefan Ebner

9 February 2021 16	Sturm Graz	2–1	Ried	Graz
18:30 CET (UTC+1)	Kiteishvili 9'; Gazibegović 90+5'	Report	Grüll 57'	Stadium: Merkur-Arena; Attendance: 0 Referee: Sebastian Gishamer

14 February 2021 17	LASK	2–0	Sturm Graz	Pasching
17:00 CET (UTC+1)	Eggestein 45'; Michorl (yellow card) 81'; Balić 84'	Report	Geyrhofer (yellow card) 54'; Gazibegović (yellow card) 80'	Stadium: Raiffeisen Arena; Attendance: 0 Referee: Harald Lechner

21 February 2021 18	Sturm Graz	1–2	Wolfsberger AC	Graz
14:30 CET (UTC+1)	Siebenhandl (red card) 35'; Ljubic 43'	Report	Baumgartner 28'; Vizinger 90'	Stadium: Merkur-Arena; Attendance: 0 Referee: Markus Hameter

28 February 2021 19	Sturm Graz	2–1	Red Bull Salzburg	Graz
17:00 CET (UTC+1)	Jäger 9'; Ljubic 22'; Yeboah (yellow card) 41'	Report	Vallci (yellow card) 15'; Daka 78' (pen.); Seiwald (yellow card) 90+3'	Stadium: Merkur-Arena; Attendance: 0 Referee: Oliver Drachta

6 March 2021 20	WSG Tirol	1–1	Sturm Graz	Innsbruck
17:00 CET (UTC+1)	Naschberger (yellow card) 6'; Rogelj (yellow card) 37'; Anselm 76'; Oswald (yellow card) 90'; Schnegg (yellow card) 90+5'	Report	Jäger (yellow card) 45+1'; Ingolitsch (yellow card) 75'; Yeboah 90+3'	Stadium: Tivoli Stadion Tirol; Attendance: 0 Referee: Manuel Schüttengruber

14 March 2021 21	Sturm Graz	2–1	Austria Wien	Graz
17:00 CET (UTC+1)	Geyrhofer (yellow card) 66'; Friesenbichler 85'; Stanković 90+4'	Report	Martel (yellow card) 44'; Pichler (red card) 57'; Fitz 87', (yellow card) 90+4'	Stadium: Merkur-Arena; Attendance: 0 Referee: Alan Kijas

21 March 2021 22	Admira Wacker Mödling	0–0	Sturm Graz	Maria Enzersdorf
17:00 CET (UTC+1)	Maier (yellow card) 26'; Aiwu (yellow card) 41'; Bauer (yellow card) 46'; Kronberger (yellow card) 57'	Report	Dante (yellow card) 67'	Stadium: BSFZ-Arena; Attendance: 0 Referee: Stefan Ebner

==== Championship round ====
Pos	Team	Pld	W	D	L	GF	GA	GD	Pts	Qualification	RBS	RWI	STU	LIN	WOL	WAT
1	Red Bull Salzburg (C)	32	25	2	5	94	33	+61	51	Qualification for the Champions League play-off round	—	2–0	3–1	2–0	1–1	4–0
2	Rapid Wien	32	17	8	7	64	40	+24	36	Qualification for the Champions League second qualifying round	0–3	—	0–0	3–0	1–2	4–0
3	Sturm Graz	32	16	8	8	52	34	+18	36	Qualification for the Europa League play-off round	1–3	4–1	—	3–1	0–1	3–2
4	LASK	32	15	6	11	55	41	+14	30	Qualification for the Europa Conference League third qualifying round	2–5	1–1	0–0	—	2–1	3–3
5	Wolfsberger AC	32	13	5	14	52	62	−10	27	Qualification for the Europa Conference League play-off final	1–2	1–8	1–3	0–4	—	2–0

Legend: Blue = home team win; Yellow = draw; Red = away team win.
Rules for classification: 1) Points; 2) Points with (possible) half points subtracted due to rounding; 3) Goal difference; 4) Goals scored; 5) Matches won; 6) Away matches won; 7) Head-to-head points; 8) Head-to-head goal difference; 9) Head-to-head goals scored.
(C) Champions

==== Results summary ====
Overall								Home						Away					
Pld	W	D	L	GF	GA	GD	Pts	W	D	L	GF	GA	GD	W	D	L	GF	GA	GD
32	16	8	8	52	34	+18	56	11	1	4	32	17	+15	5	7	4	20	17	+3

Last updated: 22 May 2021.
Source: Austrian Football Bundesliga

==== Results by round ====
Round	1	2	3	4	5	6	7	8	9	10
Ground	A	H	A	H	H	A	H	A	H	A
Result	L	W	D	L	W	D	L	W	W	W
Position	4	4	4	4	3	3	3	3	3	3

Updated to match(es) played on 22 May 2021. Source: Austrian Football Bundesliga
A = Away; H = Home; W = Win; D = Draw; L = Loss

==== Matches ====
4 April 2021 23	Red Bull Salzburg	3–1	Sturm Graz	Wals-Siezenheim
17:00 CEST (UTC+2)	Daka 3', 5', 11', (penalty missed) 69'; Berisha (yellow card) 34'; Wöber (yellow card) 37'; Junuzović (yellow card) 48'; Bernardo (yellow card) 90'	Report	Dante 13'; Jantscher (yellow card) 38'; Jäger (yellow card) 69'; Friesenbichler (yellow card) 90+1'	Stadium: Stadion Wals-Siezenheim; Attendance: 0 Referee: Julian Weinberger

11 April 2021 24	Sturm Graz	3–2	WSG Tirol	Graz
14:30 CEST (UTC+2)	Jantscher 17', 23'; Hierländer 33'; Stanković (yellow card) 68'; Jäger (yellow card) 69' (yellow-red card) 90+3'	Report	Frederiksen 15', 71'; Behounek (yellow card) 79'; Buchacher (yellow card) 83'	Stadium: Merkur-Arena; Attendance: 0 Referee: Josef Spurny

18 April 2021 25	Rapid Wien	0–0	Sturm Graz	Vienna
17:00 CEST (UTC+2)	Greiml (yellow card) 45+2'; Stojković (yellow card) 90+2'	Report	Yeboah (red card) 39'; Balaj (yellow card) 82'	Stadium: Allianz Stadion; Attendance: 0 Referee: Stefan Ebner

21 April 2021 26	Sturm Graz	0–1	Wolfsberger AC	Graz
18:30 CEST (UTC+2)	Geyrhofer (red card) 89'	Report	Giorbelidze (yellow card) 42'; Leitgeb (yellow card) 51'; Liendl 90' (pen.)	Stadium: Merkur-Arena; Attendance: 0 Referee: Gerhard Grobelnik

25 April 2021 27	Sturm Graz	3–1	LASK	Graz
17:00 CEST (UTC+2)	Nemeth 29'; Jantscher 45' (pen.), (yellow card) 86'; Yeboah 54' (pen.)	Report	Wiesinger (yellow card) 45'; Potzmann 86'; Reiter (yellow card) 90'	Stadium: Merkur-Arena; Attendance: 0 Referee: Christopher Jäger

28 April 2021 28	LASK	0–0	Sturm Graz	Pasching
18:30 CEST (UTC+2)		Report	Geyrhofer (yellow card) 65'; Jantscher (yellow card) 77'; Dante (yellow card) 78'; Stanković (yellow card) 88'	Stadium: Raiffeisen Arena; Attendance: 0 Referee: Alan Kijas

9 May 2021 29	Sturm Graz	1–3	Red Bull Salzburg	Graz
14:30 CEST (UTC+2)	Stanković (yellow card) 46'; Kiteishvili 56'	Report	Aaronson 20', 78'; Junuzović 83'; Adeyemi (yellow card) 90+6'	Stadium: Merkur-Arena; Attendance: 0 Referee: Gerhard Grobelnik

12 May 2021 30	WSG Tirol	2–3	Sturm Graz	Innsbruck
18:30 CEST (UTC+2)	Koch (yellow card) 29'; Frederiksen 39', 72', (yellow card) 40'; Celic (yellow card) 55'	Report	Nemeth 31'; Yeboah 38'; Hierländer 55'	Stadium: Tivoli Stadion Tirol; Attendance: 0 Referee: Sebastian Gishamer

16 May 2021 31	Sturm Graz	4–1	Rapid Wien	Graz
17:00 CEST (UTC+2)	Kiteishvili 60'; Yeboah 72'; Dante (yellow card) 77'; Kuen 79'; Ljubic 90+2'	Report	Kara 20'; Greiml (yellow card) 38'; Petrovič (yellow card) 48'; Fountas (yellow card) 52'	Stadium: Merkur-Arena; Attendance: 0 Referee: Walter Altmann

22 May 2021 32	Wolfsberger AC	1–3	Sturm Graz	Wolfsberg
17:00 CEST (UTC+2)	Röcher (red card) 28'; Joveljić 36'; Leitgeb (yellow card) 70'; Vizinger (yellow card) 90+1'	Report	Yeboah (yellow card) 11', (goal) 59', 67'; Jantscher (yellow card) 25'; Scherzer 54' (o.g.); Balaj (penalty missed) 80'	Stadium: Lavanttal-Arena; Attendance: 0 Referee: Markus Hameter

=== Austrian Cup ===
28 August 2020 First round	Sturm Graz	8–0	SV Innsbruck	Graz
20:30 CEST (UTC+2)	Balaj 4' 28' 86'; Rene Waldhart 9' (o.g.); Stanković 14'; Friesenbichler 34'; Hierländer 66'; Sebastian Zettl 82'	Report	Rene Waldhart (red card) 74'	Stadium: Merkur-Arena; Attendance: 1,250; Referee: Rene Eisner

17 October 2020 Second round	Hohenems	1–2	Sturm Graz	Hohenems
15:00 CEST (UTC+2)	Stefanon (yellow card) 70'; Weixlbaumer (yellow card) 77'; Wunderli 86'	Report	Jantscher 40' (pen.); Balaj 46'; Stanković (yellow card) 65'; Wüthrich (yellow card) 83'	Stadium: Herrenriedstadion; Attendance: 500; Referee: Felix Ouschan

24 November 2020 Third round	Sturm Graz	1–0	Wacker Innsbruck	Graz
20:25 CET (UTC+1)	Ingolitsch (yellow card) 60'; Kuen 68'	Report	João Luiz (yellow card) 14'; Kofler (yellow card) 48'	Stadium: Merkur-Arena; Attendance: 0 Referee: Alan Kijas

5 February 2021 Quarter-finals	Sturm Graz	1–0	First Vienna	Graz
20:30 CET (UTC+1)	Jantscher 63'	Report		Stadium: Merkur-Arena; Attendance: 0 Referee: Christopher Jäger

3 March 2021 Semi-finals	Sturm Graz	0–4	Red Bull Salzburg	Klagenfurt
21:05 CET (UTC+1)	Ingolitsch (yellow card) 25'; Stanković (yellow card) 44'; Yeboah (yellow card) 67'	Report	Bernède (yellow card) 33'; Mwepu 36', 54'; Berisha 72'; Aaronson 79'	Stadium: Wörthersee Stadion; Attendance: 0 Referee: Julian Weinberger
Note: The match was played at Wörthersee Stadion in Klagenfurt instead of Sturm Graz's regular home stadium, the Merkur-Arena in Graz, due to lawn problems there.
