= Aleksandar Borković =

Austrian footballer

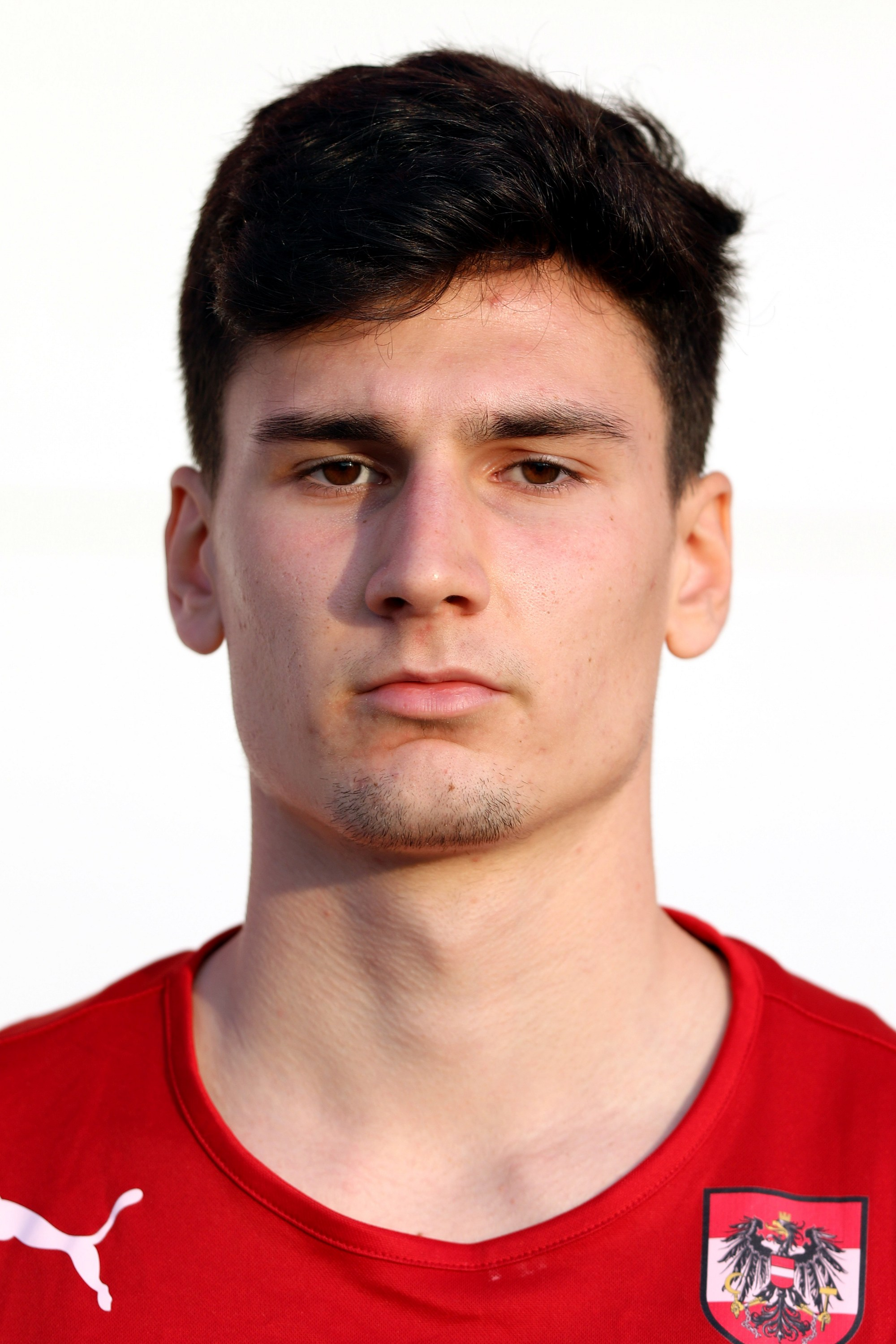
- Borković with Austria U18 in 2017

Personal information
- Date of birth: 11 June 1999 (age 27)
- Place of birth: Vienna, Austria
- Height: 1.84 m (6 ft 0 in)
- Position: Defender

Team information
- Current team: SKN St. Pölten
- Number: 26

Senior career*
Years	Team	Apps	(Gls)
2016–2020	Austrian Wien	38	(1)
2018–2019	FK Austria Wien II	11	(0)
2020–2023	1899 Hoffenheim II	4	(0)
2021–2023	→ Sturm Graz (loan)	27	(1)
2023–2025	Sturm Graz	2	(0)
2023–2025	Sturm Graz II	8	(0)
2026–	SKN St. Pölten	5	(0)

International career^{‡}
2014	Austria U15	3	(1)
2014–2015	Austria U16	7	(0)
2015–2016	Austria U17	10	(1)
2016–2017	Austria U18	4	(0)
2017	Austria U19	2	(1)
2019	Austria U20	1	(0)
2019–2020	Austria U21	3	(0)
- * Club domestic league appearances and goals as of 17 May 2026 ‡ National team caps and goals as of 4 September 2020

Aleksandar Borković (born 11 June 1999) is an Austrian professional footballer who plays for SKN St. Pölten.

== Club career ==
Borković grew up in the Austria Wien.

On 26 August 2020, he signed with German club 1899 Hoffenheim II.

On 30 August 2021, he moved to Sturm Graz on a two-year loan.

On 23 May 2023, he moved permanently to SK Sturm Graz on a three-year contract.

== Career statistics ==
=== Club ===
As of match played 3 December 2023

Appearances and goals by club, season and competition
Club	Season	League			Cup		Continental		Other		Total	
Club	Season	Division	Apps	Goals	Apps	Goals	Apps	Goals	Apps	Goals	Apps	Goals
Austria Wien	2016–17	Austrian Bundesliga	2	0	—		—		—		2	0
Austria Wien	2017–18	Austrian Bundesliga	11	0	0	0	3	1	—		14	1
Austria Wien	2018–19	Austrian Bundesliga	6	1	—		—		—		6	1
Austria Wien	2019–20	Austrian Bundesliga	21	0	0	0	—		—		21	0
Austria Wien	Total		40	1	0	0	3	1	—		43	2
1899 Hoffenheim II	2020–21	Regionalliga	4	0	—		—		—		4	0
Sturm Graz II	2023–24	2. Liga	5	0	—		—		—		5	0
Sturm Graz (loan)	2021–22	Austrian Bundesliga	7	0	1	0	1	0	—		9	0
Sturm Graz (loan)	2022–23	Austrian Bundesliga	20	1	3	0	2	0	—		25	1
Sturm Graz (loan)	Total		27	1	4	0	1	0	—		34	1
Sturm Graz	2023–24	Austrian Bundesliga	2	0	1	0	1	0	—		4	0
Career total			78	2	5	0	7	1	0	0	90	3
