= Ivan Ljubić =

Austrian footballer (born 1996)

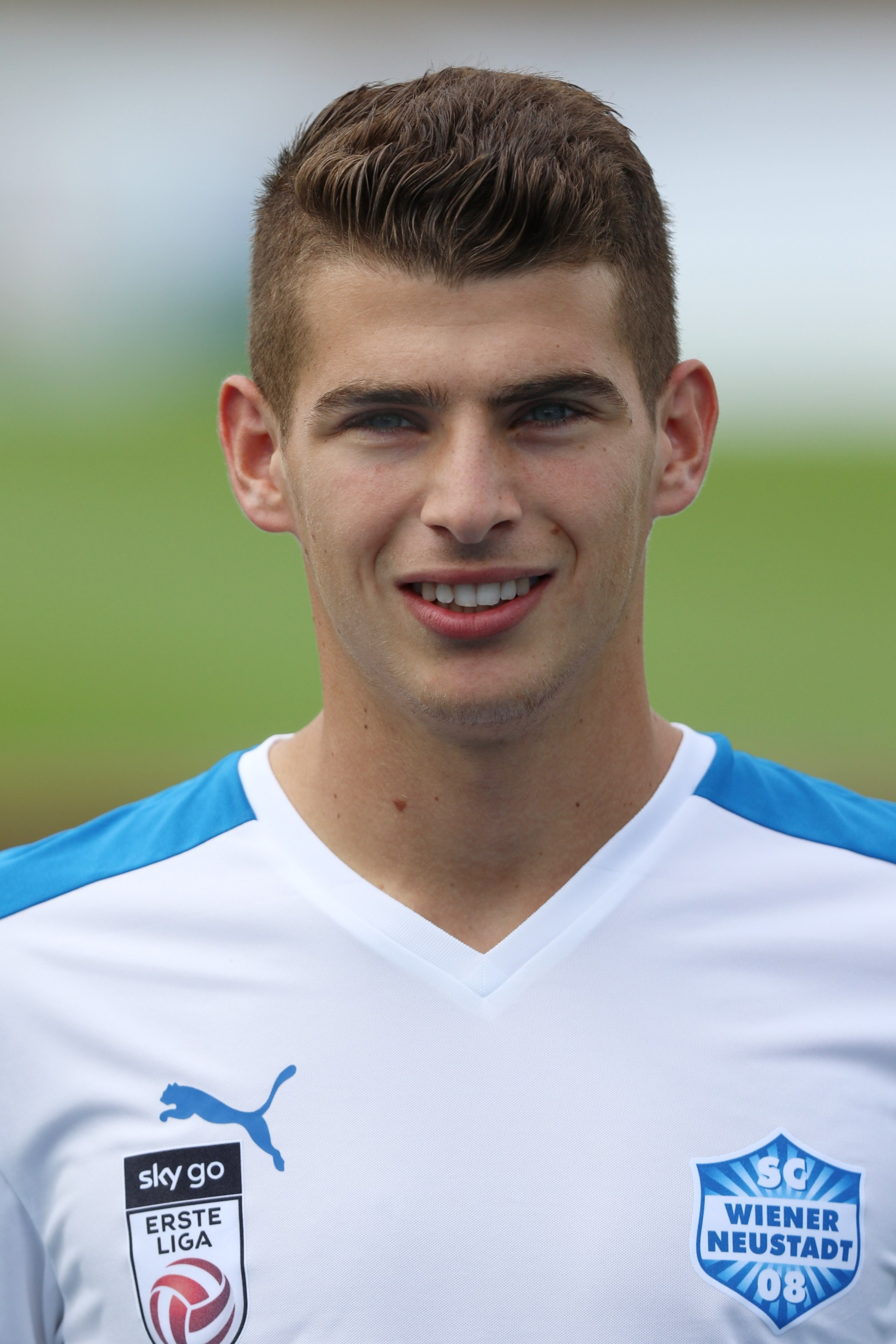
- Ljubić with SC Wiener Neustadt in 2017

Personal information
- Date of birth: 7 July 1996 (age 30)
- Place of birth: Vienna, Austria
- Height: 1.84 m (6 ft 0 in)
- Position: Defensive midfielder

Team information
- Current team: Apollon Limassol
- Number: 77

Youth career
- 2002–2010: First Vienna FC
- 2010–2014: Austria Wien

Senior career*
Years	Team	Apps	(Gls)
2014–2015	Austria Wien II	18	(0)
2015–2017	SV Horn	47	(5)
2017–2023	Sturm Graz	119	(11)
2017–2018	→ SC Wiener Neustadt (loan)	32	(3)
2018–2019	→ TSV Hartberg (loan)	18	(1)
2023–2025	LASK	26	(1)
2024	LASK Amateure OÖ	26	(1)
2025–	Apollon Limassol	31	(2)

International career^{‡}
2018–2019	Austria U21	10	(0)
- * Club domestic league appearances and goals as of 14 June 2026 ‡ National team caps and goals as of 20 June 2019

Ivan Ljubić (born 7 July 1996) is an Austrian professional footballer who plays as a defensive midfielder for Cypriot First Division club Apollon Limassol.

== Club career ==
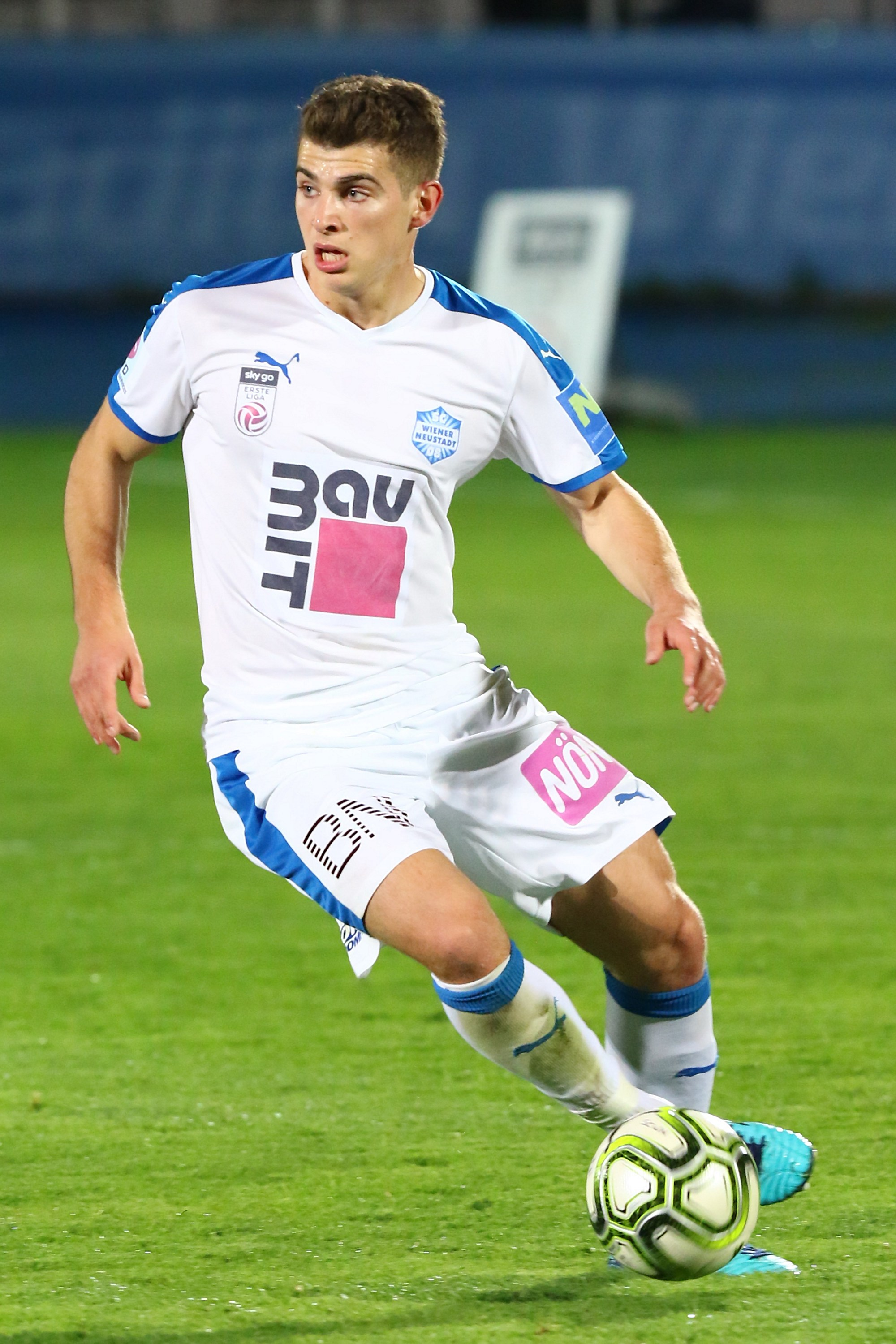
Ljubić with SC Wiener Neustadt in 2018

Ljubić began his career at First Vienna FC before joining the academy of Austria Wien in 2010. In October 2014, he made his first appearance for the club's reserve team in the Regionalliga.

Ahead of the 2015–16 season, Ljubić signed for SV Horn. He helped the club win the Regionalliga East title that season and secure promotion to professional football. He made his debut in the second tier on matchday five of the 2016–17 season against Floridsdorfer AC, coming on in the 71st minute for Tomislav Jurić.

After Horn were relegated, Ljubić joined Austrian Bundesliga side Sturm Graz ahead of the 2017–18 season, signing a contract until June 2019. He was immediately loaned to second-tier club SC Wiener Neustadt.

For the 2018–19 season, he was loaned to TSV Hartberg. He made his debut in the Austrian Bundesliga in July 2018 against his parent club Sturm Graz, and scored his first top-flight goal in September 2018 in a 2–1 win over SCR Altach. During the winter break of that season, Ljubić was recalled by Sturm. Over the following four and a half years, he made 151 competitive appearances for the club, including 117 in the Bundesliga, and won the ÖFB-Cup in 2023. After the 2022–23 season, he left Graz and joined league rivals LASK on a contract until June 2025. He made 26 Bundesliga appearances for LASK.

Ahead of the 2025–26 season, Ljubić joined Cypriot First Division club Apollon Limassol.

== International career ==
Ljubić made his debut for the Austria national under-21 team in September 2018, when he was named in the starting line-up for a UEFA European Under-21 Championship qualifier against Armenia.

== Personal life ==
Ljubić was born in Vienna, Austria, and is of Croatian descent.

== Career statistics ==
As of match played 23 March 2026

Appearances and goals by club, season and competition
Club	Season	League			Cup		Europe		Other		Total	
Club	Season	Division	Apps	Goals	Apps	Goals	Apps	Goals	Apps	Goals	Apps	Goals
Austria Wien II	2014–15	Austrian Regionalliga East	18	0	—		—		—		18	0
SV Horn	2015–16	Austrian Regionalliga East	27	3	2	0	—		—		29	3
SV Horn	2016–17	2. Liga	20	2	1	0	—		—		21	2
SV Horn	Total		47	5	3	0	—		—		50	5
Wiener Neustädt (loan)	2017–18	2. Liga	32	3	1	0	—		2 (Note: Appearances in Relegation play-offs)	0	35	3
TSV Hartberg (loan)	2018–19	Austrian Bundesliga	18	1	1	0	—		—		19	1
Sturm Graz	2018–19	Austrian Bundesliga	15	0	—		—		—		15	0
Sturm Graz	2019–20	Austrian Bundesliga	29	1	4	1	2 (Note: Appearances in UEFA Europa League)	1	—		35	3
Sturm Graz	2020–21	Austrian Bundesliga	32	7	5	0	0	0	—		37	7
Sturm Graz	2021–22	Austrian Bundesliga	21	2	2	0	8	0	—		31	2
Sturm Graz	2022–23	Austrian Bundesliga	22	1	4	0	7 (Note: Two appearances in UEFA Champions League, five appearances in UEFA Europa League)	0	—		33	1
Sturm Graz	Total		119	11	15	1	17	1	—		151	13
LASK	2023–24	Austrian Bundesliga	14	0	4	0	7	0	—		25	0
LASK	2024–25	Austrian Bundesliga	15	1	2	0	0	0	—		17	1
LASK	Total		29	1	6	0	7	0	—		42	1
LASK II	2024–25	Austrian Regionalliga Central	1	0	—		—		—		1	0
Apollon Limassol	2025–26	Cypriot First Division	24	1	3	0	—		—		27	1
Career total			288	22	29	1	24	1	2	0	343	24

== Honours ==
Sturm Graz

- Austrian Cup: 2022–23
