= Amadou Dante =

Malian footballer

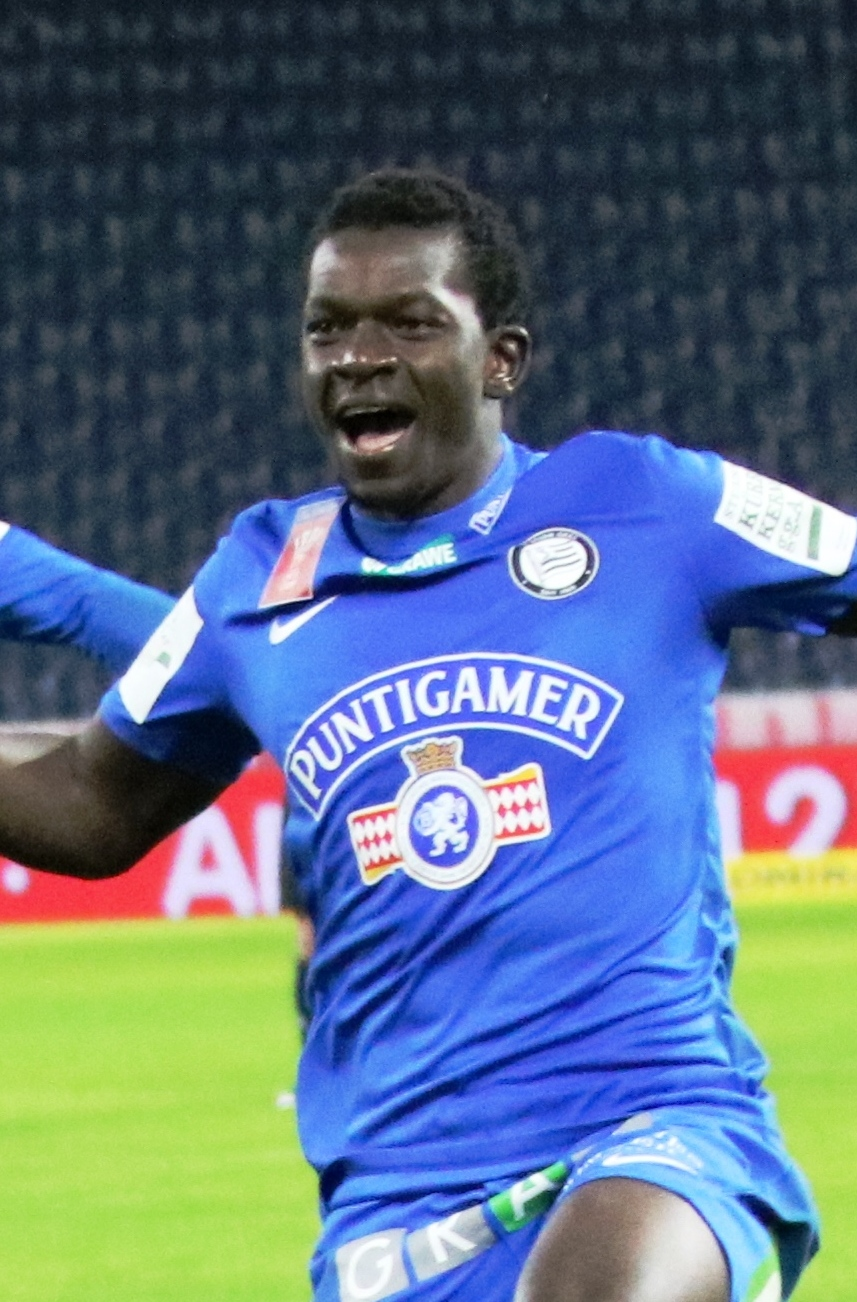
- Dante in 2023

Personal information
- Date of birth: 7 October 2000 (age 26)
- Height: 1.79 m (5 ft 10 in)
- Position: Left-back

Team information
- Current team: Zbrojovka Brno

Youth career
- –2019: Yeelen Olympique

Senior career*
Years	Team	Apps	(Gls)
2019–2025	Sturm Graz	94	(1)
2019–2020	→ Hartberg (loan)	10	(1)
2024	→ Zürich (loan)	14	(2)
2024–2025	→ Arouca (loan)	16	(0)
2025–2026	Arouca	17	(0)
2026–	Zbrojovka Brno	9	(0)

International career^{‡}
2019	Mali U20	4	(0)
2022–	Mali	22	(0)
- * Club domestic league appearances and goals as of 19 September 2026 ‡ National team caps and goals as of 4 October 2026

Amadou Dante (born 7 October 2000) is a Malian professional footballer who plays as a left-back for Czech First League club Zbrojovka Brno.

== Club career ==
Amadou Dante started his career at Malian side Yeelen Olympique. Shortly after the tournament, the Austrian club Sturm Graz signed him and immediately loaned him to TSV Hartberg. In the following years Dante was mostly a first-team regular at Sturm Graz, played many international matches and won the Austrian Cup in 2023.

In February 2024, After playing at the Africa Cup of Nations in 2024, Dante joined FC Zürich in Switzerland on loan with an option to buy. The club finally decided not to buy Dante. In summer 2024, Portuguese side Arouca loaned Dante for one year with an option to buy. At the end of the season, he joined the club on a permanent basis, signing a three-year contract.

On 17 July 2026, Dante signed a multi-year contract with Czech First League club Zbrojovka Brno.Dante stated that Zbrojovka Brno's sporting project and the club's ambitions were the main reasons behind his decision to join the Czech side.

== International career ==
Dante participated in the U-20 Africa Cup of Nations in 2019. He plays three games in this competition, all of them as the holder, including Mali's final against Senegal, after a shoot-out.

Amadou Dante honours his first selection with Mali national team on 4 June 2022, against Congo. He's got a tenure and his team wins by four goals to zero. On 2 January 2024, he was selected from the list of 27 Malian players selected by Eric Chelle to compete in the 2023 Africa Cup of Nations.

On 11 December 2025, Dante was called up to the Mali squad for the 2025 Africa Cup of Nations.

== Career statistics ==
=== Club ===
As of match played 19 September 2026

Appearances and goals by club, season and competition
Club	Season	League			Cup		Continental		Other		Total	
Club	Season	Division	Apps	Goals	Apps	Goals	Apps	Goals	Apps	Goals	Apps	Goals
Sturm Graz	2019–20	Austrian Football Bundesliga	0	0	0	0	–		0	0	0	0
Sturm Graz	2020–21	Austrian Football Bundesliga	31	1	5	0	–		–		36	1
Sturm Graz	2021–22	Austrian Football Bundesliga	31	0	2	0	8 (Note: Appearances in UEFA Europa League)	0	–		41	0
Sturm Graz	2022–23	Austrian Football Bundesliga	21	0	4	0	8 (Note: Six appearances in UEFA Europa League, two appearances in UEFA Champions League)	0	–		33	0
Sturm Graz	2023–24	Austrian Football Bundesliga	11	0	2	0	6 (Note: Four appearances in UEFA Europa League, two appearances in UEFA Champions League)	0	–		20	0
Sturm Graz	Total		94	1	13	0	22	0	–		89	1
Hartberg (loan)	2019–20	Austrian Football Bundesliga	10	1	0	0	–		0	0	10	1
Zürich (loan)	2023–24	Swiss Super League	14	2	–		–		–		14	2
Arouca (loan)	2024–25	Primeira Liga	16	0	1	0	–		–		17	0
Arouca	2025–26	Primeira Liga	17	0	0	0	–		0	0	17	0
Zbrojovka Brno	2026–27	Czech First League	9	0	1	0	–		–		10	0
Career total			160	4	15	0	22	0	0	0	198	4

=== International ===
As of matches played on 4 October 2026

Appearances and goals by national team and year
National team	Year	Apps	Goals
Mali	2022	3	0
Mali	2023	4	0
Mali	2024	4	0
Mali	2025	8	0
Mali	2026	3	0
Total		22	0
