= Niklas Geyrhofer =

Austrian footballer

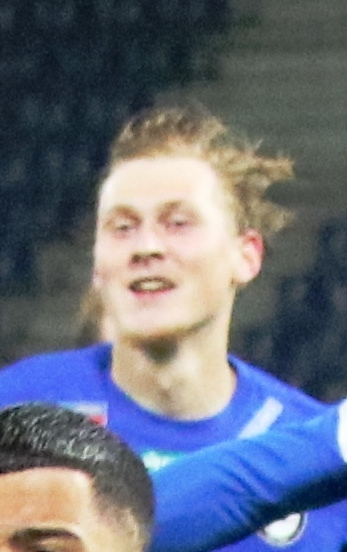
- Geyrhofer in 2023

Personal information
- Date of birth: 11 February 2000 (age 26)
- Place of birth: Graz, Austria
- Height: 1.88 m (6 ft 2 in)
- Position: Defender

Team information
- Current team: Sturm Graz
- Number: 35

Senior career*
Years	Team	Apps	(Gls)
2018–	Sturm Graz II	41	(1)
2020–	Sturm Graz	73	(1)
- * Club domestic league appearances and goals as of 25 October 2026

Niklas Geyrhofer (born 11 February 2000) is an Austrian professional footballer who plays as a Defender for Sturm Graz.

== Career statistics ==
As of match played 25 October 2026

Appearances and goals by club, season and competition
Club	Season	League			Austrian Cup		Europe		Total	
Club	Season	Division	Apps	Goals	Apps	Goals	Apps	Goals	Apps	Goals
Sturm Graz II	2018–19	Austrian Regionalliga Central	20	1	—		—		20	1
Sturm Graz II	2019–20	Austrian Regionalliga Central	9	0	—		—		9	0
Sturm Graz II	2022–23	2. Liga	8	0	—		—		8	0
Sturm Graz II	2023–24	2. Liga	3	0	—		—		3	0
Sturm Graz II	2025–26	2. Liga	1	0	—		—		1	0
Sturm Graz II	Total		41	1	—		—		41	1
Sturm Graz	2019–20	Austrian Bundesliga	6	0	0	0	0	0	6	0
Sturm Graz	2020–21	Austrian Bundesliga	10	0	2	0	0	0	12	0
Sturm Graz	2021–22	Austrian Bundesliga	12	0	3	1	6 (Note: Appearances in UEFA Europa League)	0	21	1
Sturm Graz	2022–23	Austrian Bundesliga	7	0	2	0	0	0	9	0
Sturm Graz	2023–24	Austrian Bundesliga	12	0	2	1	1 (Note: Appearances in UEFA Europa Conference League)	0	15	1
Sturm Graz	2024–25	Austrian Bundesliga	17	1	2	0	6 (Note: Appearances in UEFA Champions League)	0	25	1
Sturm Graz	2025–26	Austrian Bundesliga	8	0	3	0	4	0	15	0
Sturm Graz	2026–27	Austrian Bundesliga	1	0	0	0	0	0	1	0
Sturm Graz	Total		73	1	14	2	17	0	104	3
Career total			113	1	14	2	17	0	144	3

== Honours ==
Sturm Graz

- Austrian Bundesliga: 2023–24, 2024–25
- Austrian Cup: 2022–23
