= Samuel Stückler =

Austrian association footballer

Personal information
- Date of birth: 14 February 2001 (age 25)
- Place of birth: Lavanttal, Austria
- Height: 1.78 m (5 ft 10 in)
- Position: Midfielder

Team information
- Current team: ASK Voitsberg
- Number: 23

Youth career
- 2007–2011: SV Bad St. Leonhard
- 2011–2019: Sturm Graz

Senior career*
Years	Team	Apps	(Gls)
2019–	Sturm Graz II	111	(9)
2021–2024	Sturm Graz	2	(0)
2025–	ASK Voitsberg	8	(0)

International career
2015	Austria U15	2	(0)
2020	Austria U19	1	(0)
- * Club domestic league appearances and goals as of 12 June 2025

Samuel Stückler (born 14 February 2001) is an Austrian professional footballer who plays as a centre-back for ASK Voitsberg.

== Career ==
Stückler is a youth product of SV Bad St. Leonhard and joined the Sturm Graz youth academy in 2011. He made his senior debut with Sturm Graz in a 3–1 Austrian Football Bundesliga win over Wolfsberger AC on 22 May 2021, coming on as a late substitute. He signed his first professional contract with Sturm Graz on 4 December 2021.

== International career ==
Stückler is a youth international for Austria, having represented the Austria U15s and U19s.

== Career statistics ==
As of match played 25 May 2024

Appearances and goals by club, season and competition
Club	Season	League			Cup		Europe		Total	
Club	Season	Division	Apps	Goals	Apps	Goals	Apps	Goals	Apps	Goals
Sturm Graz II	2018–19	Austrian Regionalliga Central	3	0	—		—		3	0
Sturm Graz II	2019–20	Austrian Regionalliga Central	14	0	—		—		14	0
Sturm Graz II	2020–21	Austrian Regionalliga Central	13	1	—		—		13	1
Sturm Graz II	2021–22	Austrian Regionalliga Central	30	4	—		—		30	4
Sturm Graz II	2022–23	Austrian Football Second League	26	2	—		—		26	2
Sturm Graz II	2023–24	Austrian Football Second League	25	2	—		—		25	2
Sturm Graz II	Total		111	9	—		—		111	9
Sturm Graz	2020–21	Austrian Bundesliga	1	0	0	0	—		1	0
Sturm Graz	2021–22	Austrian Bundesliga	1	0	0	0	1 (Note: Appearance in UEFA Europa League)	0	2	0
Sturm Graz	Total		2	0	0	0	1	0	3	0
Career total			113	9	0	0	1	0	114	9
