= Jon Gorenc Stanković =

Slovenian footballer (born 1996)

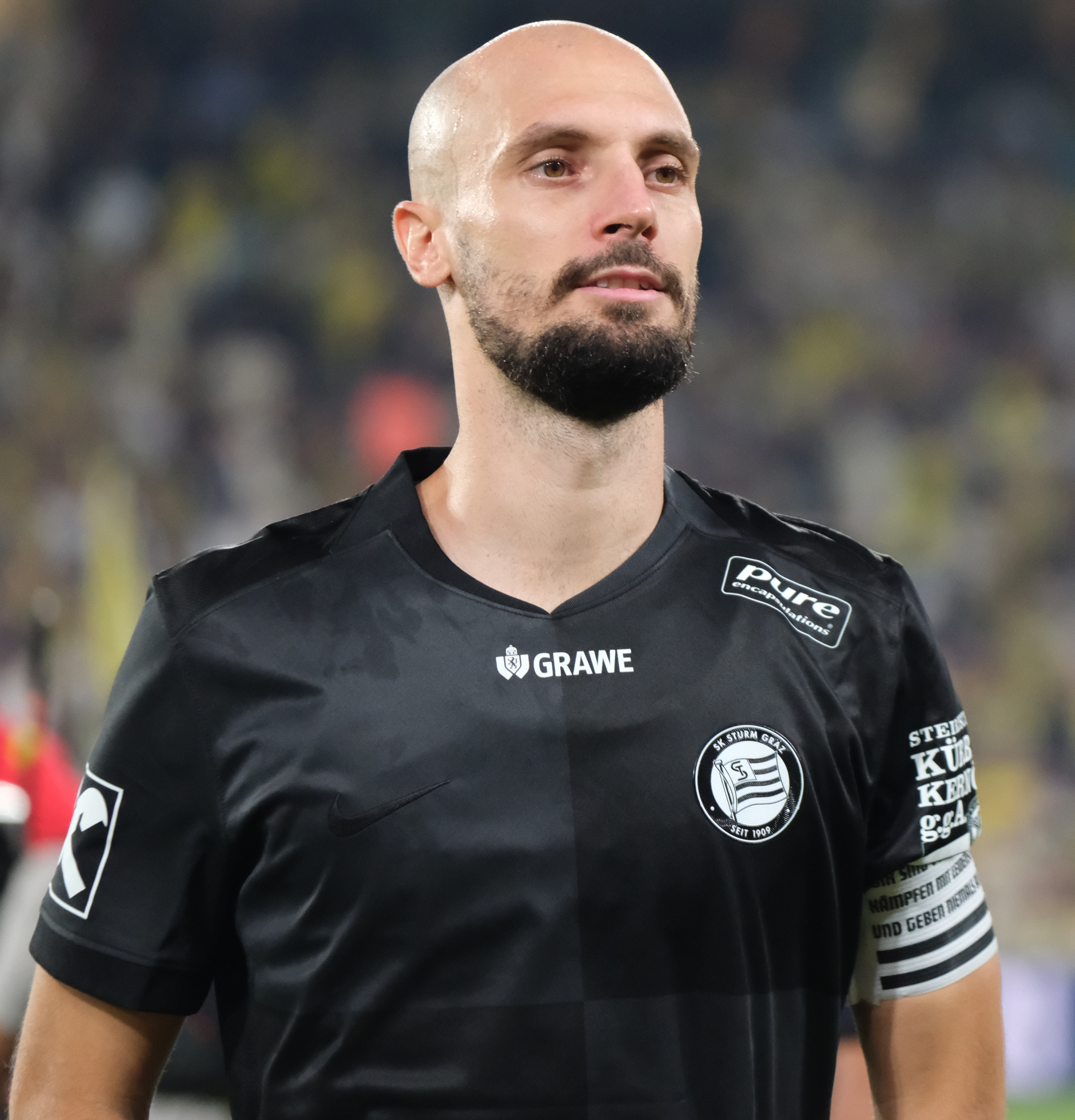
- Stanković with Sturm Graz in 2026

Personal information
- Date of birth: 14 January 1996 (age 30)
- Place of birth: Ljubljana, Slovenia
- Height: 1.90 m (6 ft 3 in)
- Positions: Defensive midfielder; centre-back

Team information
- Current team: Sturm Graz
- Number: 4

Youth career
- 2012–2014: Domžale

Senior career*
Years	Team	Apps	(Gls)
2013–2016	Domžale	18	(0)
2014–2016	→ Borussia Dortmund II (loan)	62	(2)
2016–2020	Huddersfield Town	37	(2)
2020–	Sturm Graz	185	(16)

International career^{‡}
2011–2012	Slovenia U16	9	(2)
2012–2013	Slovenia U17	8	(0)
2013	Slovenia U18	1	(0)
2013–2014	Slovenia U19	10	(0)
2015–2018	Slovenia U21	17	(2)
2020–	Slovenia	33	(1)
- * Club domestic league appearances and goals as of 25 October 2026 ‡ National team caps and goals as of 18 November 2025

Jon Gorenc Stanković (born 14 January 1996) is a Slovenian professional footballer who plays as a defensive midfielder for the Austrian Football Bundesliga side Sturm Graz and the Slovenia national team.

== Club career ==
=== Huddersfield Town ===
Gorenc Stanković made his debut for Huddersfield Town in an EFL Cup tie with Shrewsbury Town on 9 August 2016. He made his league debut as a late substitute against Rotherham United on 27 September 2016. He scored his first goal for Huddersfield Town on 19 August 2018 in a 6–1 defeat to Manchester City.

=== Sturm Graz ===
On 29 June 2020, Gorenc Stanković signed a three-year contract with the Austrian Football Bundesliga side Sturm Graz, though he remained at Huddersfield for the remainder of the season, extended due to the COVID-19 pandemic, having signed a short-term extension.

== International career ==
Gorenc Stanković was called-up to the senior Slovenia squad by Srečko Katanec for a friendly against Turkey in June 2016.

Four years after his first call-up to the national team, he made his debut in the friendly match against San Marino on 7 October 2020.

In May 2024, he was named by Matjaž Kek to Slovenia's preliminary squad for UEFA Euro 2024. He was subsequently included in the final 26-man squad for the tournament. He made substitute appearances in all four of Slovenia's matches at the tournament, helping the team reach the round of 16 for the first time in its history.

== Career statistics ==
=== Club ===
As of match played 29 October 2026

Appearances and goals by club, season and competition
Club	Season	League			National cup (Note: Includes Slovenian Cup, FA Cup, Austrian Cup)		League cup (Note: Includes EFL Cup)		Continental		Total	
Club	Season	Division	Apps	Goals	Apps	Goals	Apps	Goals	Apps	Goals	Apps	Goals
Domžale	2012–13	Slovenian PrvaLiga	6	0	0	0	—		—		6	0
Domžale	2013–14	Slovenian PrvaLiga	12	0	1	0	—		2 (Note: Appearances in UEFA Europa League)	0	15	0
Domžale	Total		18	0	1	0	—		2	0	21	0
Borussia Dortmund II (loan)	2014–15	3. Liga	31	1	—		—		—		31	1
Borussia Dortmund II (loan)	2015–16	Regionalliga West	31	1	—		—		—		31	1
Borussia Dortmund II (loan)	Total		62	2	—		—		—		62	2
Huddersfield Town	2016–17	Championship	7	0	4	0	1	0	—		12	0
Huddersfield Town	2017–18	Premier League	0	0	0	0	0	0	—		0	0
Huddersfield Town	2018–19	Premier League	11	1	1	0	1	0	—		13	1
Huddersfield Town	2019–20	Championship	19	1	1	0	1	0	—		21	1
Huddersfield Town	Total		37	2	6	0	3	0	—		46	2
Sturm Graz	2020–21	Austrian Bundesliga	30	3	5	1	—		—		35	4
Sturm Graz	2021–22	Austrian Bundesliga	30	4	3	0	—		7	1	40	5
Sturm Graz	2022–23	Austrian Bundesliga	31	2	6	0	—		7 (Note: Two appearances in UEFA Champions League, five appearances in UEFA Europa League)	0	44	2
Sturm Graz	2023–24	Austrian Bundesliga	28	3	4	1	—		12 (Note: Two appearances and one goal in UEFA Champions League, six appearances in UEFA Europa League, four appearances and one goal in UEFA Europa Conference League)	2	44	6
Sturm Graz	2024–25	Austrian Bundesliga	26	1	3	1	—		5 (Note: Appearances in UEFA Champions League)	0	34	2
Sturm Graz	2025–26	Austrian Bundesliga	30	2	3	0	—		10 (Note: Two appearances in UEFA Champions League, eight appearances in UEFA Europa League)	0	43	2
Sturm Graz	2026–27	Austrian Bundesliga	10	1	2	0	—		7 (Note: Four appearances and one goal in UEFA Champions League, three appearances in UEFA Europa League)	1	19	2
Sturm Graz	Total		185	16	26	3	—		48	4	259	23
Career total			302	20	33	3	3	0	50	4	388	27

=== International ===
As of match played 18 November 2025

Appearances and goals by national team and year
National team	Year	Apps	Goals
Slovenia	2020	1	0
Slovenia	2021	6	1
Slovenia	2022	8	0
Slovenia	2023	5	0
Slovenia	2024	9	0
Slovenia	2025	4	0
Total		33	1

Scores and results list Slovenia's goal tally first, score column indicates score after each Gorenc Stanković goal.

List of international goals scored by Jon Gorenc Stanković
No.	Date	Venue	Opponent	Score	Result	Competition
1	4 June 2021	Bonifika Stadium, Koper, Slovenia	Gibraltar	6–0	6–0	Friendly

== Honours ==
Sturm Graz

- Austrian Bundesliga: 2023–24, 2024–25
- Austrian Cup: 2022–23, 2023–24
