= Sandro Ingolitsch =

Austrian footballer (born 1997)

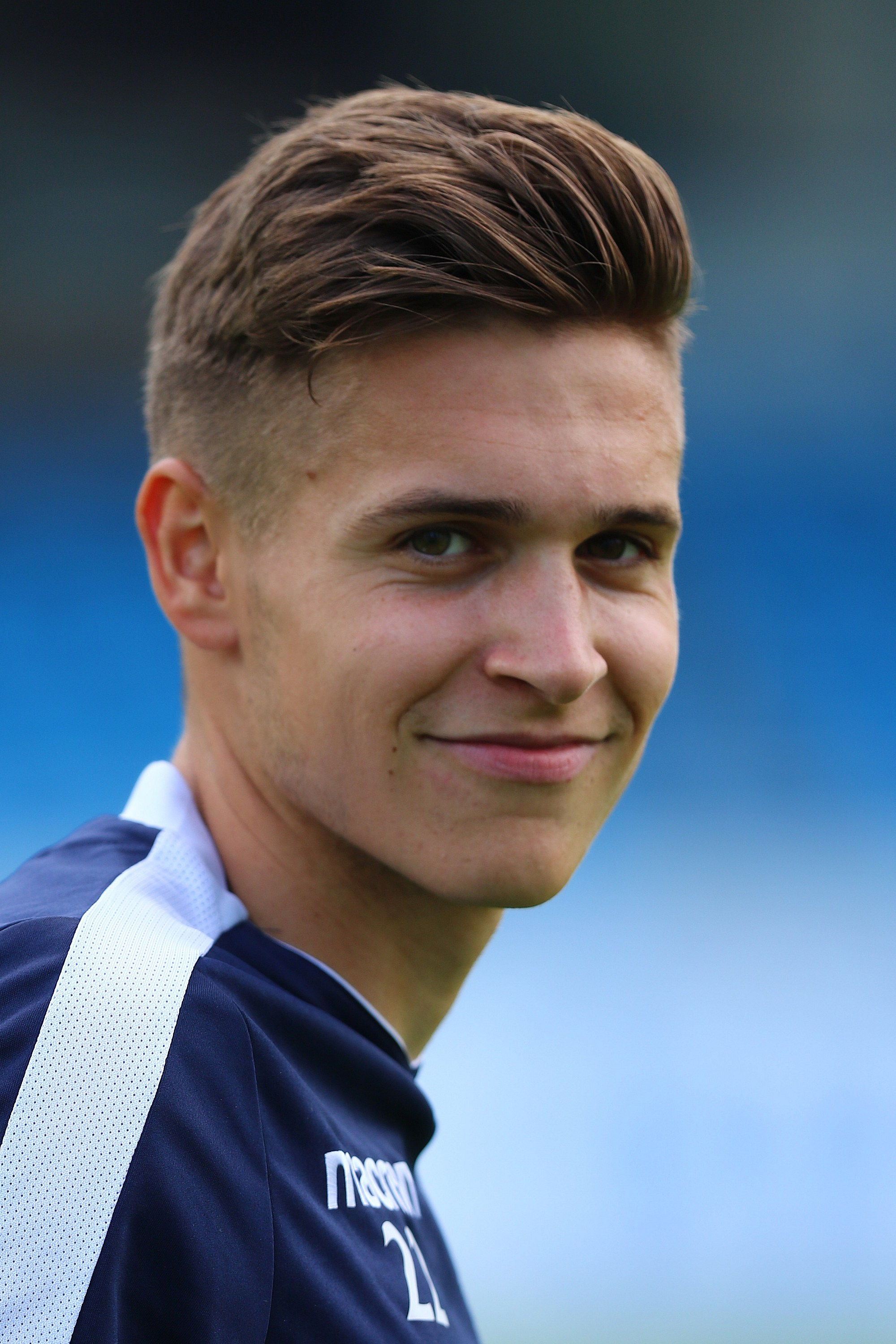
- Ingolitsch with SKN St. Pölten in 2018

Personal information
- Date of birth: 18 April 1997 (age 29)
- Place of birth: Schwarzach im Pongau, Austria
- Height: 1.79 m (5 ft 10 in)
- Positions: Right-back; right midfielder

Youth career
- 2005–2010: SK Bischofshofen
- 2010–2011: USK Anif
- 2011–2017: FC Red Bull Salzburg

Senior career*
Years	Team	Apps	(Gls)
2015–2017	FC Liefering	39	(0)
2017–2020	SKN St. Pölten	73	(2)
2020–2023	Sturm Graz	22	(0)
2023–2026	Rheindorf Altach	78	(1)

International career^{‡}
2013	Austria U17	2	(0)
2014–2015	Austria U18	4	(0)
2016	Austria U19	6	(0)
2017–2019	Austria U21	15	(0)
- * Club domestic league appearances and goals as of 10 June 2026 ‡ National team caps and goals as of 20 June 2019

Sandro Ingolitsch (born 18 April 1997) is an Austrian professional footballer who plays as a right-back or right midfielder.

== Club career ==
Sandro Ingloitsch started his career with SK Bischofshofen and USK Anif. In 2011 he went to the FC Red Bull Salzburg football academy, where he played in all teams. In 2015 he was captain of the U18 team winning the Austrian Championship. He made his Austrian Football First League debut for FC Liefering on 29 May 2015 in a game against SV Mattersburg.

In the summer of 201, Ingolitsch joined St. Polten. On 8 July 2017, he made his debut in a friendly against Monaco.

On 5 August 2020 he signed with Sturm Graz.

On 14 August 2023, Ingolitsch joined Rheindorf Altach on a one-year contract with an option for a second year.

== Career statistics ==
As of match played on 6 February 2026

Appearances and goals by club, season and competition
Club	Season	League			National cup		Continental		Total	
Club	Season	Division	Apps	Goals	Apps	Goals	Apps	Goals	Apps	Goals
Liefering	2014–15	2. Liga	1	0	—		—		1	0
Liefering	2015–16	2. Liga	15	0	—		—		15	0
Liefering	2016–17	2. Liga	23	0	—		—		23	0
Liefering	Total		39	0	—		—		39	0
St. Polten	2017–18	Austrian Bundesliga	22	1	0	0	—		22	1
St. Polten	2018–19	Austrian Bundesliga	26	0	3	0	—		29	0
St. Polten	2019–20	Austrian Bundesliga	27	1	2	0	—		29	1
St. Polten	Total		75	2	5	0	—		80	2
Sturm Graz	2020–21	Austrian Bundesliga	16	0	3	0	—		19	0
Sturm Graz	2021–22	Austrian Bundesliga	1	0	0	0	—		1	0
Sturm Graz	2022–23	Austrian Bundesliga	5	0	1	0	2 (Note: Appearances in UEFA Europa League)	0	8	0
Sturm Graz	Total		22	0	4	0	2	0	28	0
Rheindorf Altach	2023–24	Austrian Bundesliga	21	0	3	0	—		24	0
Rheindorf Altach	2024–25	Austrian Bundesliga	27	0	0	0	—		27	0
Rheindorf Altach	2025–26	Austrian Bundesliga	16	0	3	0	—		19	0
Rheindorf Altach	Total		64	0	6	0	—		70	0
Career total			200	2	15	0	2	0	217	2
