= Sandro Schendl =

Austrian association footballer

Personal information
- Date of birth: 19 March 2003 (age 23)
- Place of birth: Güssing, Austria
- Height: 1.73 m (5 ft 8 in)
- Position: Winger

Team information
- Current team: SV Oberwart
- Number: 11

Youth career
- 2009–2013: Mischendorf/Neuhaus
- 2013–2014: SV Güssing
- 2014–2020: Sturm Graz

Senior career*
Years	Team	Apps	(Gls)
2020–2023	Sturm Graz II	64	(15)
2021–2023	Sturm Graz	1	(0)
2023–2024	SV Ried	14	(1)
2024–2025	TSV Hartberg	0	(0)
2024–2025	Hartberg II	15	(0)
2025–	SV Oberwart	29	(4)

International career^{‡}
2017–2018	Austria U15	8	(1)
2018–2019	Austria U16	11	(4)
2019	Austria U17	5	(0)
2021	Austria U18	1	(0)
2021–	Austria U19	8	(0)
- * Club domestic league appearances and goals as of 28 June 2026 ‡ National team caps and goals as of 6 June 2023

Sandro Schendl (born 19 March 2003) is an Austrian professional footballer who plays as a winger for Austrian Regionalliga club SV Oberwart.

== Career ==
Schendl is a youth product of Mischendorf/Neuhaus and SV Güssing, before joining the academy of Sturm Graz in 2014. He started training with their reserves in 2020. On 25 November 2020, Schendl signed his first professional contract with the club. He made his senior debut with Sturm Graz in a 3–1 Austrian Football Bundesliga loss to RB Salzburg on 4 April 2021. Schendl signed a two-year contract with SV Reid on 30 June 2023.

On 19 June 2025, Schendl, alongside teammate Michael Hutter, joined SV Oberwart.

== International career ==
Schendl is a youth international for Austria, having most recently represented the Austria U19s.
