= Lukas Jäger =

Austrian footballer

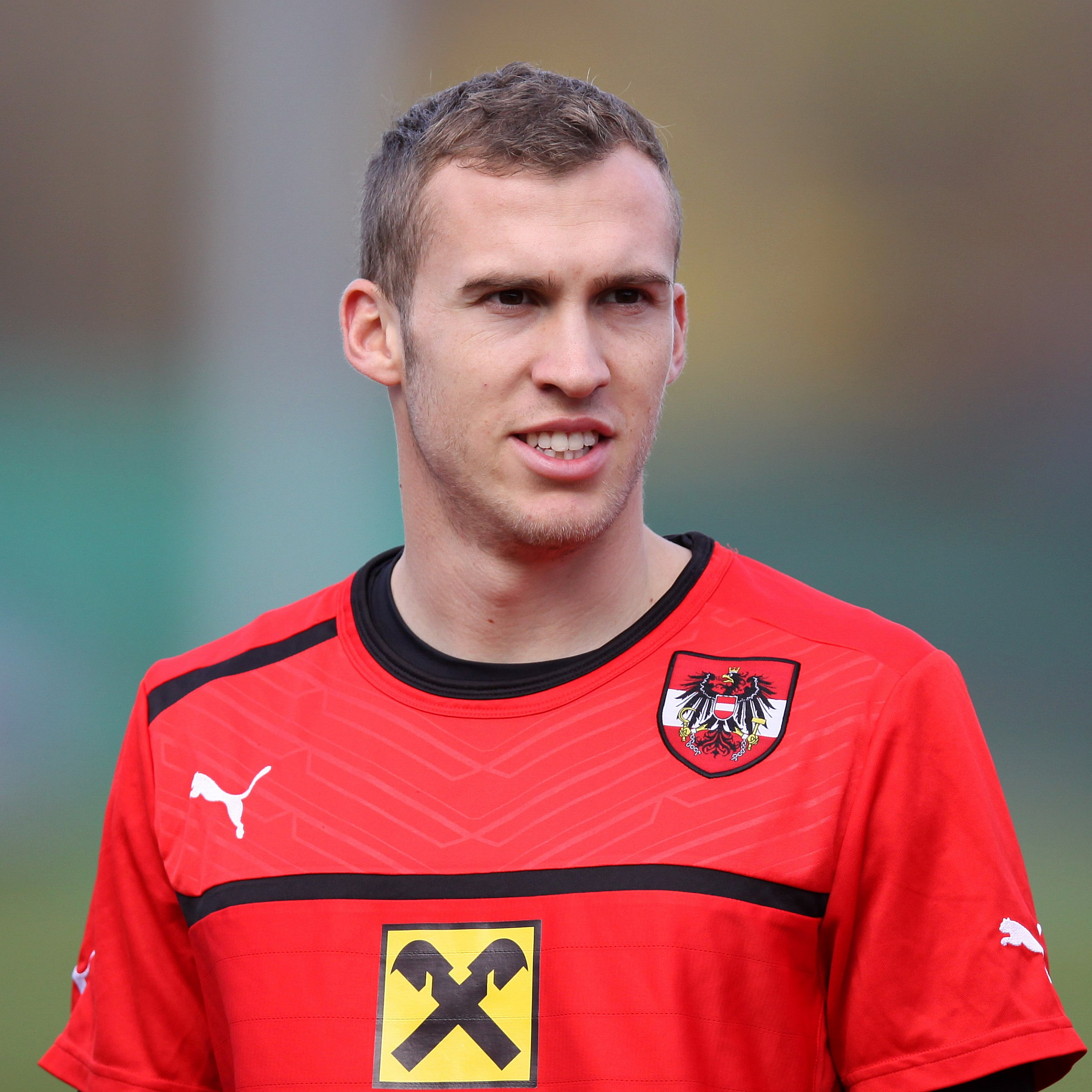
- Jäger with Austria U21 in 2015

Personal information
- Date of birth: 12 February 1994 (age 32)
- Place of birth: Alberschwende, Austria
- Height: 1.84 m (6 ft 0 in)
- Positions: Defensive midfielder; centre-back

Team information
- Current team: Rheindorf Altach
- Number: 23

Youth career
- 2003–2008: FC Alberschwende
- 2008–2011: AKA Vorarlberg

Senior career*
Years	Team	Apps	(Gls)
2011–2015	SC Rheindorf Altach II	59	(5)
2011–2017	SC Rheindorf Altach	112	(3)
2017–2020	1. FC Nürnberg	16	(0)
2017–2020	1. FC Nürnberg II	14	(2)
2020–2022	Sturm Graz	64	(2)
2022–	Rheindorf Altach	113	(2)

International career
2009–2010	Austria U16	8	(0)
2010–2011	Austria U17	9	(0)
2011	Austria U18	2	(0)
2012–2013	Austria U19	11	(1)
2014–2016	Austria U21	18	(0)
- * Club domestic league appearances and goals as of 10 June 2026

Lukas Jäger (born 12 February 1994) is an Austrian professional footballer who plays for Rheindorf Altach.
