= Vincent Trummer =

Austrian footballer

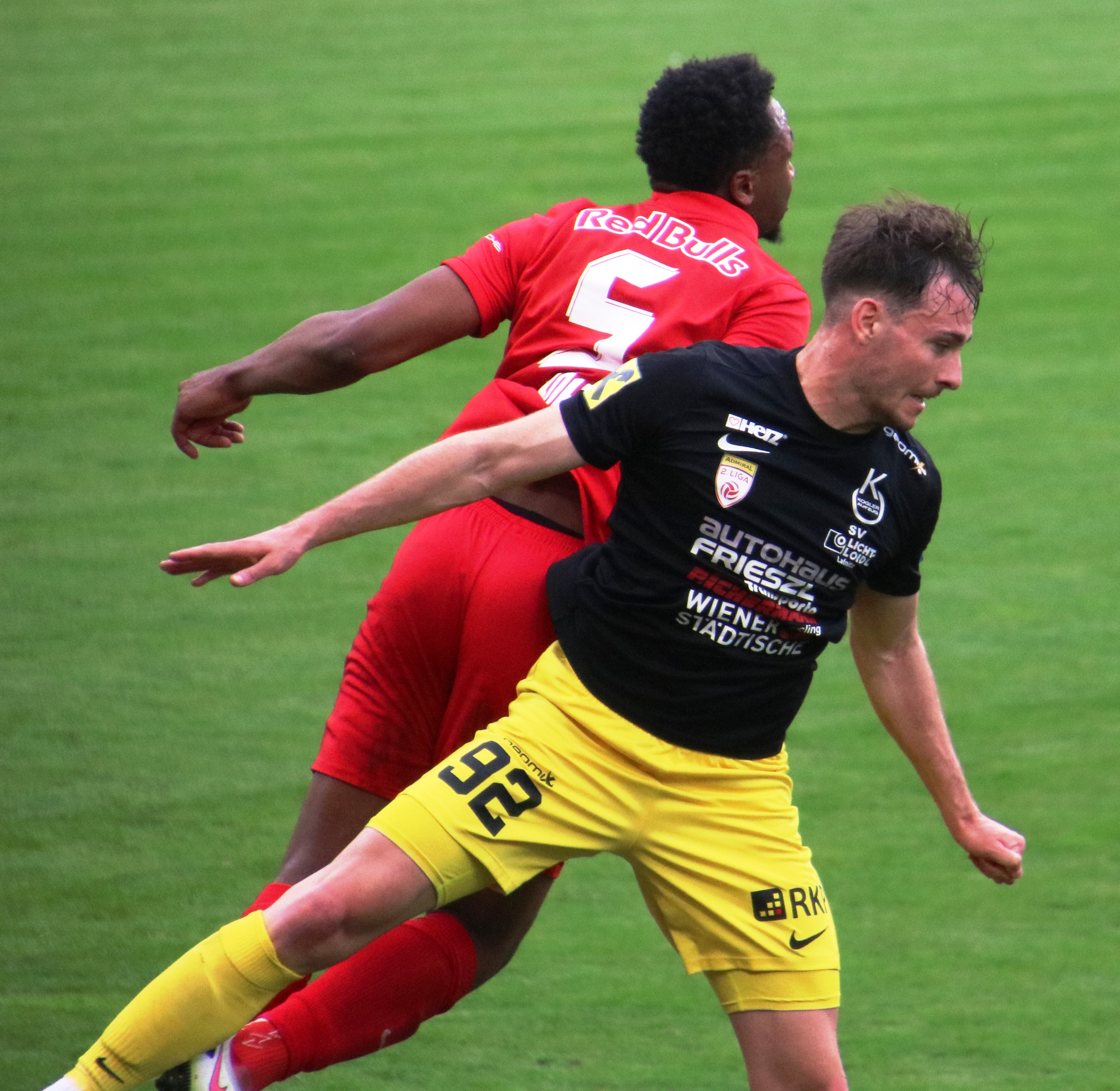

Personal information
- Date of birth: 18 May 2000 (age 26)
- Place of birth: Austria
- Height: 1.89 m (6 ft 2 in)
- Position: Defender

Team information
- Current team: Zlín

Senior career*
Years	Team	Apps	(Gls)
2017–2022	SK Sturm Graz II	73	(4)
2020–2022	SK Sturm Graz	11	(0)
2023	SV Lafnitz	11	(1)
2023–2025	Dynamo České Budějovice	44	(3)
2025–	Zlín	0	(0)

International career^{‡}
2018	Austria U19	3	(0)
2019	Austria U20	1	(0)
- * Club domestic league appearances and goals as of 4 January 2025 ‡ National team caps and goals as of 6 June 2019

Vincent Trummer (born 18 May 2000) is an Austrian footballer who plays for Zlín.

== Club career ==
On 11 January 2023, Trummer signed with SV Lafnitz.

On 10 July 2023, Trummer signed a two-year contract with Czech side Dynamo České Budějovice.

On 5 September 2025, Trummer signed a three-year contract with Czech First League club Zlín as a free agent.
