= Harald Lechner =

Austrian football referee

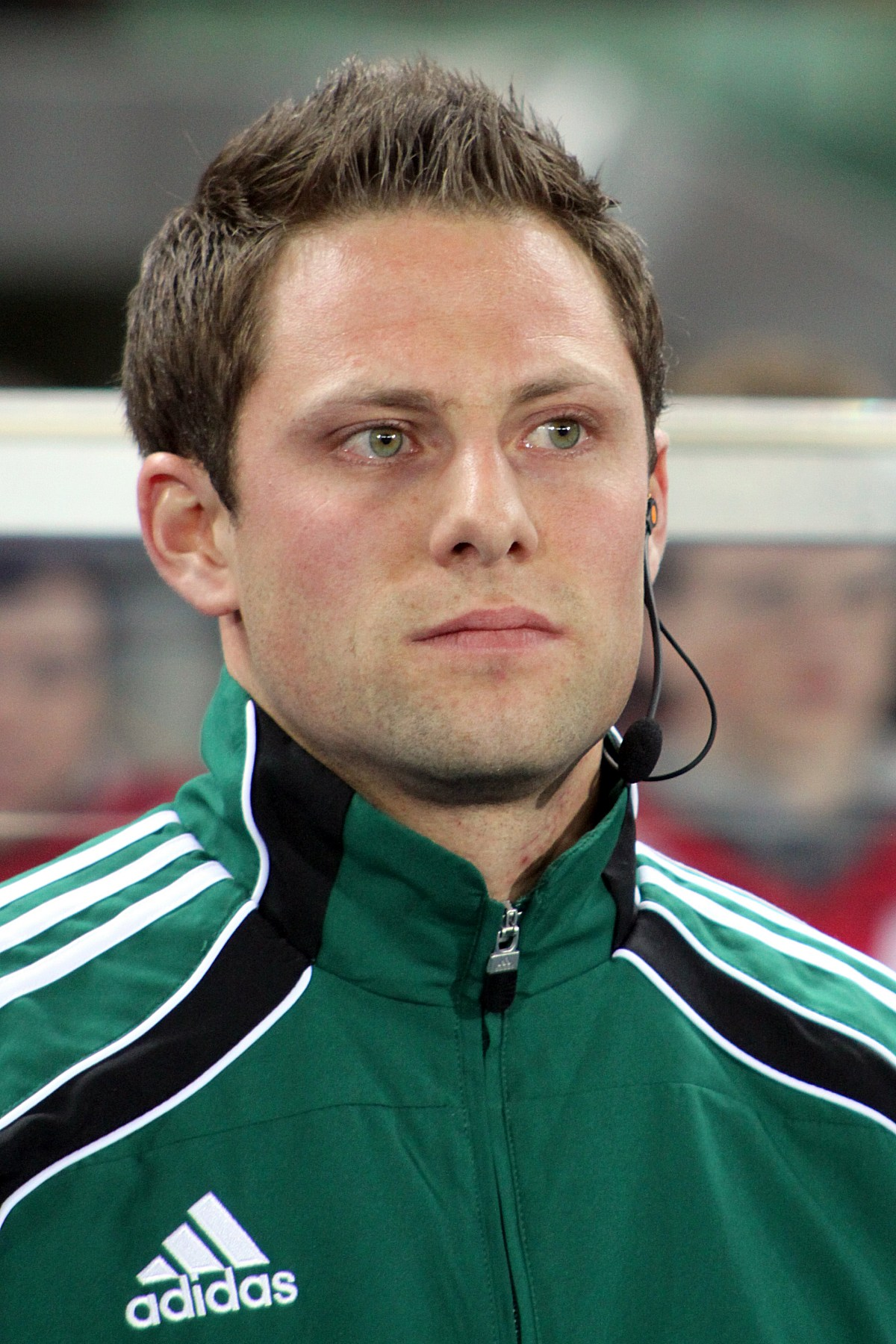
- Born: 30 July 1982 (age 44); Vienna, Austria

Domestic
Years	League	Role
2008–	Austrian Bundesliga	Referee

International
Years	League	Role
2010–	FIFA listed	Referee

Harald Lechner (born 30 July 1982) is an Austrian professional football referee. He has been a full international for FIFA since 2010.
