= Paul Komposch =

Austrian association footballer

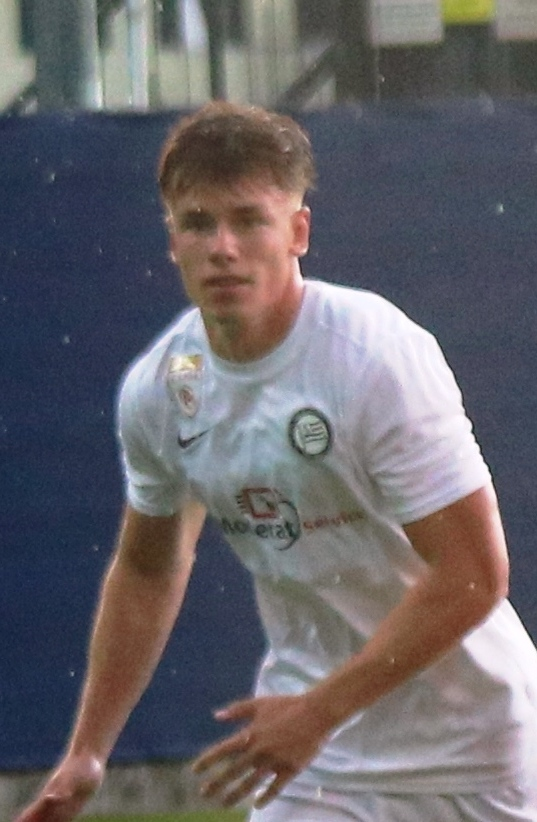
- Komposch in 2022

Personal information
- Date of birth: 13 May 2001 (age 25)
- Place of birth: Austria
- Height: 1.87 m (6 ft 2 in)
- Position: Centre-back

Team information
- Current team: TSV Hartberg
- Number: 14

Youth career
- 2009–2011: FC Stattegg
- 2011–2019: Sturm Graz

Senior career*
Years	Team	Apps	(Gls)
2019–2023	Sturm Graz II	85	(8)
2020–2023	Sturm Graz	2	(0)
2023–	TSV Hartberg	63	(0)
- * Club domestic league appearances and goals as of 10 June 2026

Paul Komposch (born 13 May 2001) is an Austrian professional footballer who plays as a centre-back for Austrian Bundesliga club TSV Hartberg.

== Career ==
Komposch is a youth product of FC Stattegg, and joined the Sturm Graz youth academy in 2011. He made his senior debut with Sturm Graz in a 8–0 Austrian Cup win over SV Innsbruck on 28 August 2020, coming on as a substitute in the 75th minute. He signed his first professional contract with Sturm Graz on 20 October 2020, keeping him at the club until June 2023. He was released in June 2023, and was subsequently picked up by TSV Hartberg on 23 June 2023.
