= Manuel Schüttengruber =

Austrian football referee

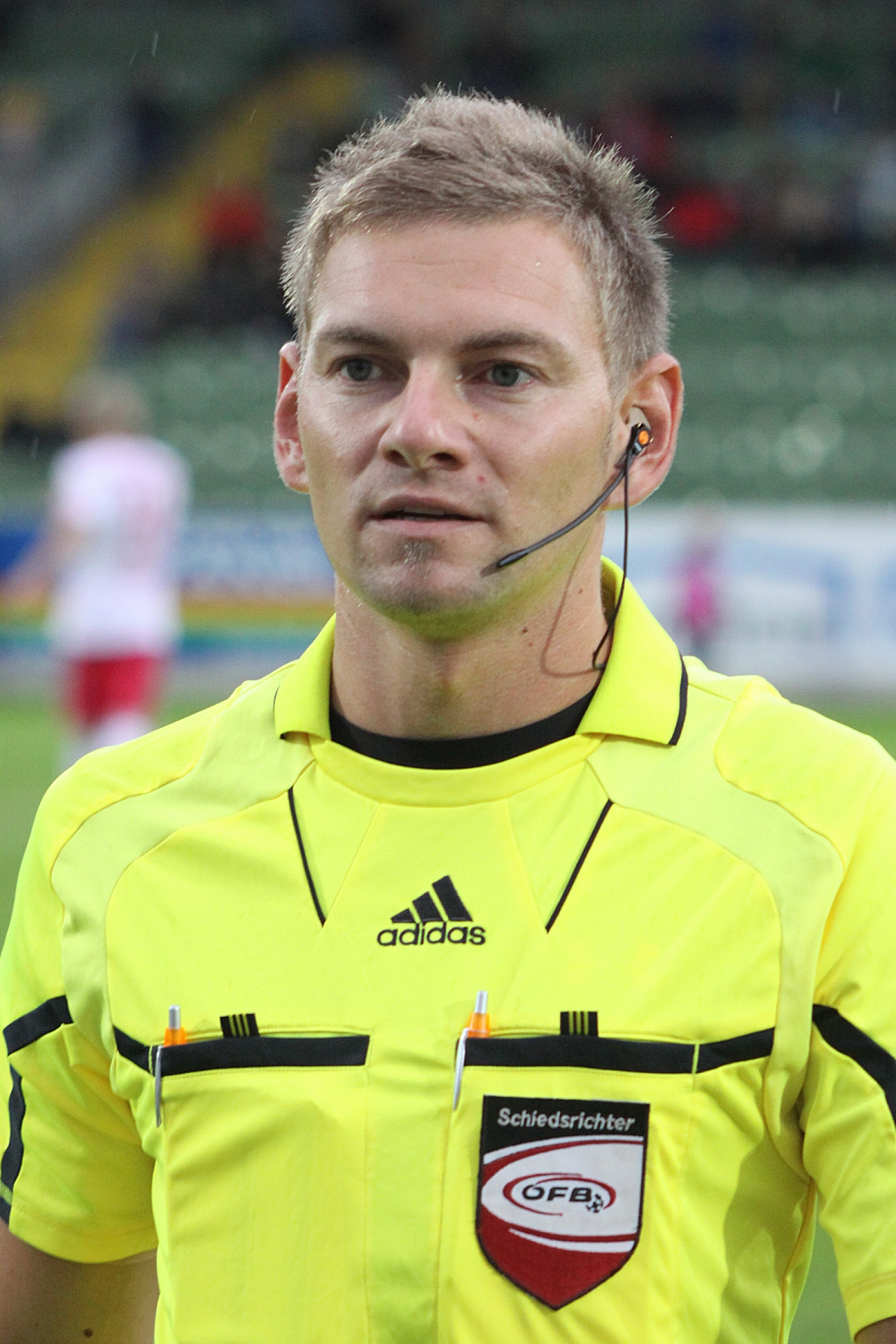
- Schüttengruber in 2010
- Born: 20 July 1983 (age 43); Linz, Austria

Domestic
Years	League	Role
2009–	Erste Liga/2. Liga	Referee
2010–	Austrian Bundesliga	Referee

International
Years	League	Role
2014–	FIFA listed	Referee

Manuel Schüttengruber (born 20 July 1983) is an Austrian football referee who officiates in the Austrian Football Bundesliga. He has been a FIFA referee since 2014, and is ranked as a UEFA first category referee.

== Refereeing career ==
In 2010, Schüttengruber began officiating in the Austrian Football Bundesliga. His first match as referee was on 28 August 2010 between SV Mattersburg and Red Bull Salzburg. He also officiated two matches in the Swiss Super League in 2012. In 2014, he was put on the FIFA referees list. He officiated his first senior international match as a FIFA referee on 15 November 2016 between the Czech Republic and Denmark.
