= 2019–20 Austrian Football Bundesliga =

108th season of top-tier football league in Austria

Austrian Bundesliga
- Season: 2019–20
- Dates: 26 July 2019 – 4 July 2020
- Champions: Red Bull Salzburg (14th title)
- Relegated: Mattersburg
- Champions League: Red Bull Salzburg; Rapid Wien
- Europa League: LASK; Wolfsberger AC; Hartberg
- Matches: 192
- Goals: 643 (3.35 per match)
- Top goalscorer: Shon Weissman (30 goals)
- Biggest home win: Red Bull Salzburg 6 – 0 Rheindorf Altach; Rheindorf Altach 6 – 0 St. Pölten
- Biggest away win: St. Pölten 0 – 6 Red Bull Salzburg
- Highest scoring: Red Bull Salzburg 7 – 2 Hartberg
- Longest winning run: Red Bull Salzburg (7 games)
- Longest unbeaten run: Red Bull Salzburg (18 games)
- Longest winless run: Admira Wacker Mödling (9 games)
- Longest losing run: Mattersburg (6 games)

The 2019–20 Austrian Football Bundesliga, also known as Tipico Bundesliga for sponsorship reasons, was the 108th season of top-tier football in Austria. Red Bull Salzburg are the six-times defending champions.

In March 2020, the league matches were postponed due to the COVID-19 pandemic.

== Teams ==
=== Changes ===
Wacker Innsbruck were relegated after just one season. WSG Tirol was promoted as champions of the 2018–19 Austrian Football Second League for the first time since 1970–71 season.

=== Stadia and locations ===
Location of teams in the 2019–20 Austrian Football Bundesliga

Team	Location	Venue	Capacity
Admira Wacker Mödling	Maria Enzersdorf	BSFZ-Arena	7,000
Austria Wien	Vienna	Generali Arena	17,500
LASK	Linz	Waldstadion Pasching	6,009
Rapid Wien	Vienna	Allianz Stadion	28,000
Red Bull Salzburg	Wals-Siezenheim	Red Bull Arena	17,218 (30,188)
Rheindorf Altach	Altach	Stadion Schnabelholz	8,500
St. Pölten	Sankt Pölten	NV Arena	8,000
Sturm Graz	Graz	Merkur-Arena	16,364
SV Mattersburg	Mattersburg	Pappelstadion	17,100
TSV Hartberg	Hartberg	Stadion Hartberg	5,000
Wolfsberger AC	Wolfsberg	Lavanttal-Arena	7,300
WSG Tirol	Innsbruck	Tivoli-Neu	16,008

== Regular season ==
=== League table ===
Pos	Team	Pld	W	D	L	GF	GA	GD	Pts	Qualification
1	Red Bull Salzburg	22	14	6	2	74	26	+48	48	Qualification for the Championship round
2	LASK (Note: LASK were deducted 12 points due to violation of pandemic restrictions.)	22	17	3	2	50	20	+30	42	Qualification for the Championship round
3	Rapid Wien	22	11	7	4	47	26	+21	40	Qualification for the Championship round
4	Wolfsberger AC	22	11	5	6	50	27	+23	38	Qualification for the Championship round
5	Sturm Graz	22	9	5	8	37	28	+9	32	Qualification for the Championship round
6	Hartberg	22	8	5	9	36	50	−14	29	Qualification for the Championship round
7	Austria Wien	22	5	10	7	33	36	−3	25	Qualification for the Relegation round
8	Rheindorf Altach	22	7	3	12	34	44	−10	24	Qualification for the Relegation round
9	Admira Wacker Mödling	22	4	7	11	22	43	−21	19	Qualification for the Relegation round
10	WSG Tirol	22	5	4	13	26	50	−24	19	Qualification for the Relegation round
11	Mattersburg	22	5	3	14	26	52	−26	18	Qualification for the Relegation round
12	St. Pölten	22	3	8	11	21	54	−33	17	Qualification for the Relegation round

Source: Austrian Football Bundesliga
Rules for classification: 1) Points; 2) Goal difference; 3) Goals scored; 4) Matches won; 5) Away matches won; 6) Head-to-head points; 7) Head-to-head goal difference; 8) Head-to-head goals scored.

=== Results ===
Home \ Away	ADM	AWI	ALT	HAR	LIN	MAT	RWI	RBS	STP	STU	WAT	WOL
Admira Wacker Mödling	—	0–0	2–0	0–1	0–1	1–3	0–3	1–1	1–1	0–2	3–1	0–3
Austria Wien	1–1	—	2–0	5–0	0–3	2–1	1–3	2–2	0–0	1–0	2–3	1–1
Rheindorf Altach	1–4	2–2	—	3–3	0–1	0–2	0–3	3–2	6–0	1–2	3–2	2–1
Hartberg	4–1	2–2	2–1	—	1–2	3–1	2–2	2–2	3–2	1–0	0–3	0–2
LASK	1–0	2–0	2–0	5–1	—	7–2	0–4	2–2	4–1	3–3	1–1	0–1
Mattersburg	1–2	1–5	0–0	2–1	0–1	—	2–3	0–3	0–1	3–3	0–2	1–4
Rapid Wien	5–0	2–2	2–1	3–3	1–2	3–1	—	0–2	0–1	1–1	2–0	1–1
Red Bull Salzburg	5–0	4–1	6–0	7–2	2–3	4–1	3–2	—	2–2	2–0	5–1	5–2
St. Pölten	2–2	2–2	0–3	1–3	0–3	0–0	2–2	0–6	—	0–4	5–1	0–4
Sturm Graz	4–1	1–1	1–2	3–1	0–2	1–2	0–1	1–1	3–0	—	2–0	0–4
WSG Tirol	1–1	3–1	0–4	0–1	0–2	1–3	0–2	1–5	1–1	1–5	—	2–0
Wolfsberger AC	2–2	3–0	5–2	3–0	1–3	5–0	2–2	0–3	4–0	0–1	2–2	—

Source: soccerway.com
Legend: Blue = home team win; Yellow = draw; Red = away team win.

== Championship round ==
The points obtained during the regular season were halved (and rounded down) before the start of the playoff. As a result, the teams started with the following points before the playoff: Red Bull Salzburg 24, LASK 21 points, Rapid Wien 20, Wolfsberger AC 19, Sturm Graz 16, and Hartberg 14.The points of Hartberg were rounded down – in the event of any ties on points at the end of the playoffs, a half point will be added for this team.

Pos	Team	Pld	W	D	L	GF	GA	GD	Pts	Qualification	RBS	RWI	WOL	LIN	HAR	STU
1	Red Bull Salzburg (C)	32	22	8	2	110	34	+76	50	Qualification for the Champions League play-off round	—	2–0	2–2	3–1	3–0	5–2
2	Rapid Wien	32	17	7	8	64	43	+21	38	Qualification for the Champions League second qualifying round	2–7	—	2–1	3–1	0–1	4–0
3	Wolfsberger AC	32	15	9	8	69	43	+26	35	Qualification for the Europa League group stage	0–0	3–1	—	3–3	2–4	2–0
4	LASK (Note: LASK were deducted 12 regular season points for violating regulations with concern to the coronavirus. Because point totals are halved before the championship round, this resulted in a deduction of 6 championship round points. The punishment was later reduced to 4 points.)	32	20	4	8	67	37	+30	33	Qualification for the Europa League third qualifying round	0–3	0–1	0–1	—	1–2	4–0
5	Hartberg (O)	32	12	6	14	52	74	−22	27	Qualification for the Europa League play-off final	0–6	0–1	3–3	1–5	—	1–2
6	Sturm Graz	32	10	5	17	46	60	−14	19		1–5	2–3	1–2	0–2	1–4	—

Legend: Blue = home team win; Yellow = draw; Red = away team win.
Rules for classification: 1) Points; 2) Points with (possible) half points subtracted due to rounding; 3) Goal difference; 4) Goals scored; 5) Matches won; 6) Away matches won; 7) Head-to-head points; 8) Head-to-head goal difference; 9) Head-to-head goals scored.
(C) Champions; (O) Play-off winners

== Relegation round ==
The points obtained during the regular season were halved (and rounded down) before the start of the playoff. As a result, the teams started with the following points before the playoff: Austria Wien 12, Rheindorf Altach 12, Admira Wacker Mödling 9, WSG Tirol 9, Mattersburg 9, and St. Pölten 8. The points of Austria Wien, Admira Wacker Mödling, WSG Tirol, and St. Pölten were rounded down – in the event of any ties on points at the end of the playoffs, a half point will be added for these teams.

Pos	Team	Pld	W	D	L	GF	GA	GD	Pts	Qualification or relegation	AWI	ALT	STP	MAT	ADM	WAT
1	Austria Wien	32	12	11	9	49	47	+2	34	Qualification for the Europa League play-off semi-final	—	0–2	2–5	1–0	1–0	1–0
2	Rheindorf Altach	32	10	8	14	45	53	−8	26	Qualification for the Europa League play-off semi-final	1–2	—	2–0	1–1	1–1	1–1
3	St. Pölten	32	8	10	14	39	65	−26	25		1–1	2–0	—	1–0	0–3	1–1
4	Mattersburg (Note: Mattersburg filed for insolvency and withdrew from the Bundesliga on 5 August 2020, sparing WSG Tirol from relegation.) (R)	32	8	6	18	39	64	−25	21	Withdrawal	1–4	1–1	2–0	—	1–2	4–1
5	Admira Wacker Mödling	32	6	10	16	29	57	−28	18		0–2	1–1	0–3	0–2	—	0–3
6	WSG Tirol	32	6	8	18	34	66	−32	16		1–2	0–1	0–5	0–1	0–0	—

Legend: Blue = home team win; Yellow = draw; Red = away team win.
Rules for classification: 1) Points; 2) Points with (possible) half points subtracted due to rounding; 3) Goal difference; 4) Goals scored; 5) Matches won; 6) Away matches won; 7) Head-to-head points; 8) Head-to-head goal difference; 9) Head-to-head goals scored.
(R) Relegated

== Europa League play-offs ==
The winner and the runner-up of the relegation round played a one-legged play-off semi-final match against each other. The winner played a two-legged final against the fifth-placed team from the championship round to determine the third Europa League participant.

=== Semi-final ===
8 July 2020
20:30

Austria Wien	1–0	Rheindorf Altach
Wimmer 27'

Generali Arena, Vienna
Referee: Sebastian Gishamer

=== Final ===
11 July 2020
17:00

Austria Wien	2–3	Hartberg
Pichler 56'; Wimmer 79'	Report	Tadić 10', 64'; Dossou 74'

Generali Arena, Vienna
Referee: Christopher Jäger
15 July 2020
20:30

Hartberg	0–0	Austria Wien
	Report

Stadion Hartberg, Hartberg
Referee: Manuel Schüttengruber

Hartberg won 3–2 on aggregate.

== Statistics ==
=== Top scorers ===
Rank	Player	Club	Goals
1	(Israel) Shon Weissman	Wolfsberger AC	30
2	(Zambia) Patson Daka	Red Bull Salzburg	24
3	(Greece) Taxiarchis Fountas	Rapid Wien	19
3	(Austria) Dario Tadić	Hartberg	19
5	(Austria) Christoph Monschein	Austria Wien	17
6	(Norway) Erling Haaland	Red Bull Salzburg	16
7	(Turkey) Sinan Bakış	Admira Wacker Mödling	12
7	(Slovenia) Zlatko Dedić	WSG Tirol	12
7	(Austria) Andreas Gruber	Mattersburg	12
7	(Brazil) Klauss	LASK	12

== Awards ==
Award	Winner	Club
Player of the Year	(Norway) Erling Haaland	Red Bull Salzburg
Top goalscorer	(Israel) Shon Weissman	Wolfsberger AC
Manager of the Year	(United States) Jesse Marsch	Red Bull Salzburg
Breakthrough of the Year	(Norway) Erling Haaland	Red Bull Salzburg

Team of the Year
Goalkeeper	(Austria) Alexander Schlager (LASK)			
Defence	(Greece) Anastasios Avlonitis (Sturm Graz)		(Spain) Jano (Mattersburg)	(Austria) Gernot Trauner (LASK)
Midfield	(Austria) Reinhold Ranftl (LASK)	(Austria) Michael Liendl (Wolfsberg)	(Austria) Zlatko Junuzović (Red Bull Salzburg)	(Austria) Andreas Ulmer (Red Bull Salzburg)
Attack	(Israel) Shon Weissman (Wolfsberg)		(Greece) Taxiarchis Fountas (Rapid Wien)	(Slovenia) Rajko Rep (Hartberg)
