= Luka Marić (footballer, born 2002) =

Austrian professional footballer

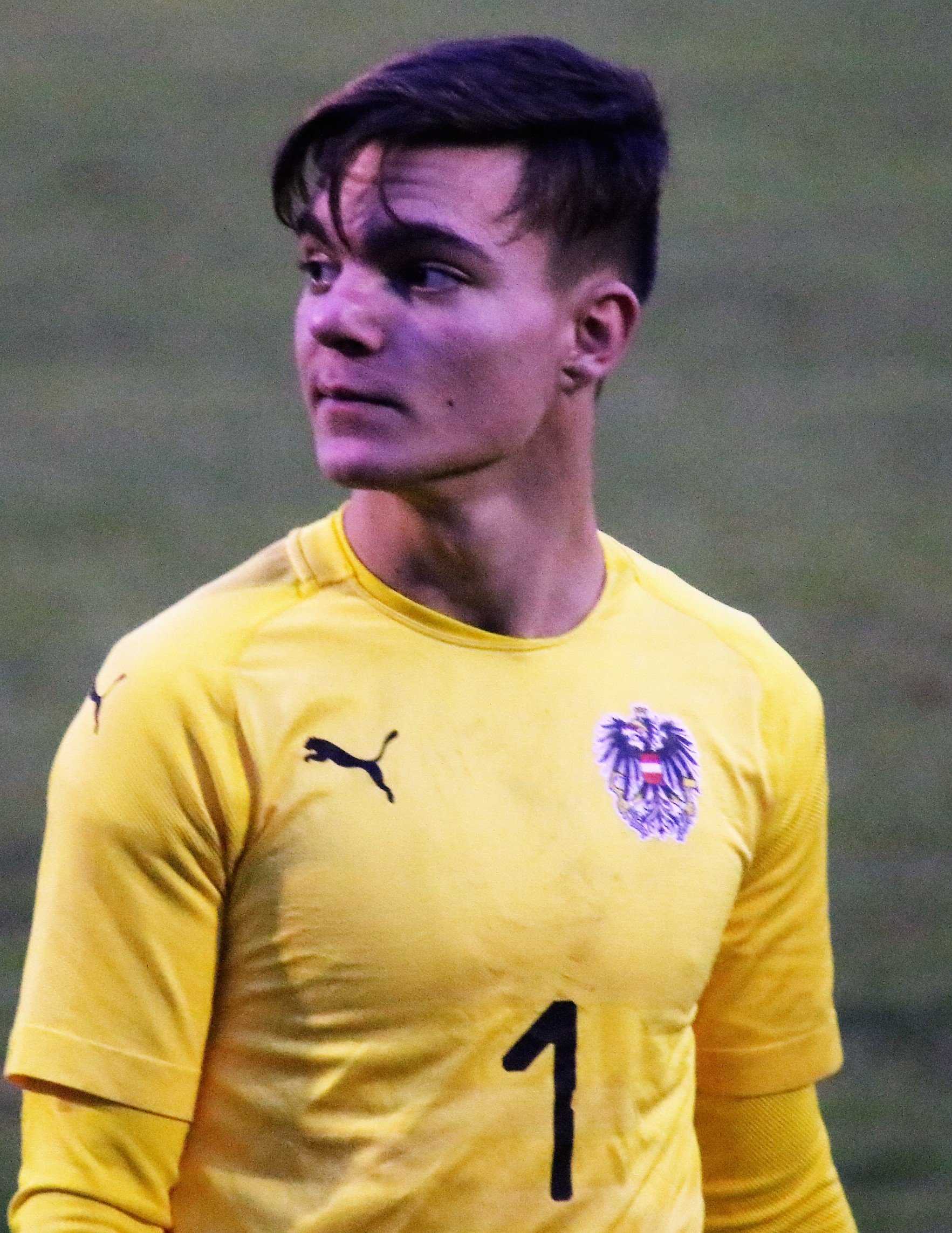
- Marić with Austria U19 in 2019

Personal information
- Full name: Luka Marić
- Date of birth: 19 July 2002 (age 24)
- Place of birth: Messendorf, Graz, Austria
- Height: 1.84 m (6 ft 0 in)
- Position: Goalkeeper

Team information
- Current team: TSV Hartberg
- Number: 21

Youth career
- 2007–2019: Sturm Graz

Senior career*
Years	Team	Apps	(Gls)
2018–2023	Sturm Graz II	66	(0)
2020–2024	Sturm Graz	2	(0)
2024–	TSV Hartberg	1	(0)

International career^{‡}
2018	Croatia U17	2	(0)
2019	Austria U18	2	(0)
2019–2020	Austria U19	11	(0)
2023	Austria U21	2	(0)
- * Club domestic league appearances and goals as of 11 June 2025 ‡ National team caps and goals as of 15:00, 25 December 2023 (UTC)

Luka Marić (born 19 July 2002) is an Austrian professional football player who plays as a goalkeeper for Austrian Bundesliga club TSV Hartberg.

== Early life ==
Luka Marić was born in the district of Messendorf in Graz, Austria. His father, Šimo (born 1972), an equipment manager who joined Sturm Graz in 1993, emigrated to Austria from his birthplace in Yugoslavia (now in Bosnia and Herzegovina) during 1992. Luka Marić joined Sturm Graz in 2007, aged 5.

== Club career ==
=== SK Sturm Graz ===
Rising through the ranks at Sturm Graz, Marić appeared for Sturm Graz at U18 level and the reserves. Marić made his professional debut for SK Sturm Graz II against Deutschlandsberger SC on 17 August 2018.

He was first named on the bench for the first team on 28 February 2021, in a fixture versus Red Bull Salzburg. After this game, he would be feature on the bench 15 more times. Marić signed a contract extension in February 2023, which would keep him at the club until 2025.

With Kjell Scherpen out with an illness for the match against SC Austria Lustenau, Marić was ushered into the starting 11. He played all 90 minutes on his first team debut, as Sturm Graz won 1–0 over Austria Lustenau in the Liebenauer Stadium on 25 November 2023. He would make one more appearance for Sturm Graz, this time against WSG Tirol at the Tivoli Stadion on 25 February 2024, securing a 2–0 win.

=== TSV Hartberg ===
On 23 July 2024, Marić joined fellow Austrian Bundesliga club TSV Hartberg, signing a two-year contract, with the option of an extension.

== International career ==
Marić is eligible to play for Croatia, Bosnia and Herzegovina and Austria. He has two caps for Croatia U17 versus Andorra U17 and Slovenia U17.

Marić then appeared for Austria U18 in two friendlies versus Italy U18 and Germany U18. He made 11 appearances for Austria U19. Marić again played in two friendlies, this time for Austria U21 against Moldova U21 and Iceland U21.

== Personal life ==
Marić was born to Šimo and Diana Marić. He has two older sisters, Natalie and Mirella. He has a nephew, Nicklas, and a niece, Milena.

== Career statistics ==
As of match played 3 March 2024

Club	Season	League			Austrian Cup		Europe		Other		Total	
Club	Season	Division	Apps	Goals	Apps	Goals	Apps	Goals	Apps	Goals	Apps	Goals
Sturm Graz II	2017–2018	Regionalliga Mitte	0	0	—		—		—		0	0
Sturm Graz II	2018–19	Regionalliga Mitte	7	0	—		—		—		7	0
Sturm Graz II	2019–20	Regionalliga Mitte	0	0	—		—		—		0	0
Sturm Graz II	2020–21	Regionalliga Mitte	11	0	—		—		—		11	0
Sturm Graz II	2021–22	Regionalliga Mitte	26	0	—		—		—		26	0
Sturm Graz II	2022–23	2. Liga	22	0	—		—		—		22	0
Sturm Graz II	Total		66	0	—		—		—		66	0
Sturm Graz	2020–21	Austrian Bundesiga	0	0	0	0	—		—		0	0
Sturm Graz	2021–22	Austrian Bundesiga	0	0	0	0	0	0	—		0	0
Sturm Graz	2022–23	Austrian Bundesiga	0	0	0	0	0	0	—		0	0
Sturm Graz	2023–24	Austrian Bundesiga	2	0	0	0	0	0	—		2	0
Career total			68	0	0	0	0	0	—		68	0

== Honours ==
=== SK Sturm Graz II ===
- Regionalliga Mitte: 2019–20

=== SK Sturm Graz ===
- Austrian Football Bundesliga: 2023–24; runner-up: 2021–22, 2022–23
- Austrian Cup: 2022–23, 2023–24
