= Amady Camara =

Malian footballer (born 2005)

Personal information
- Date of birth: 28 May 2005 (age 21)
- Place of birth: Bamako, Mali
- Height: 1.80 m (5 ft 11 in)
- Position: Forward

Team information
- Current team: Randers
- Number: 36

Youth career
- FC Diarra

Senior career*
Years	Team	Apps	(Gls)
2023–2024	Sturm Graz II	13	(6)
2023–2026	Sturm Graz	36	(1)
2025–2026	→ Nantes (loan)	10	(0)
2025–2026	→ Nantes B (loan)	6	(3)
2026–	Randers	7	(0)

International career^{‡}
2024–	Mali	2	(0)
- * Club domestic league appearances and goals as of 15 November 2026 ‡ National team caps and goals as of 10 September 2024

Amady Camara (born 28 May 2005) is a Malian professional footballer who plays as a forward for Danish Superliga club Randers and the Mali national team.

== Club career ==
Camara was born in Mali, in the capital city of Bamako. He began playing football for FC Diarra until he was 17, joining Austrian Bundesliga club Sturm Graz in summer 2023.

He began playing for the reserve team, making his debut for the team in the second tier, in a game against SKN St. Pölten, coming on as a substitute in a 4–1 loss. He scored his first professional goal in a 2–2 draw against Floridsdorfer AC, scoring an 83rd-minute equaliser. During that season, Camara scored 6 goals in 13 games, including a brace against SV Lafnitz in a 5–2 loss.

Camara made his first-team and Austrian Bundesliga debut against Austria Klagenfurt in November 2023, coming on as a substitute in the 65th minute, and thereby became the 4000th player to make an appearance in the Austrian Bundesliga. He went on to make 17 appearances for the first team that season, scoring one goal against Austria Klagenfurt. In February 2024, he scored his first goal for the club, in a 4–1 win against Slovan Bratislava in the first leg of the UEFA Conference League play-offs.

On 9 August 2025, Camara joined Nantes in France on loan with an option to buy.

On 31 August 2026, Camara joined Danish Superliga side Randers FC on a four-year contract.

== International career ==
Camara made his debut for the Mali national team on 6 September 2024 in a Africa Cup of Nations qualifier against Mozambique at the Stade du 26 Mars.

== Career statistics ==
=== Club ===
As of match played 18 January 2026

Appearances and goals by club, season and competition
Club	Season	League			National cup (Note: Includes Austrian Cup)		Continental		Total	
Club	Season	Division	Apps	Goals	Apps	Goals	Apps	Goals	Apps	Goals
Sturm Graz II	2023–24	Austrian 2.Liga	13	6	—		—		13	6
Sturm Graz	2023–24	Austrian Bundesliga	17	1	3	0	4 (Note: Appearances in UEFA Europa Conference League)	1	24	2
Sturm Graz	2024–25	Austrian Bundesliga	19	0	3	0	4 (Note: Appearance(s) in UEFA Champions League)	0	26	0
Sturm Graz	2025–26	Austrian Bundesliga	0	0	0	0	1	0	1	0
Sturm Graz	Total		36	1	7	0	4	0	51	2
Nantes (loan)	2025–26	Ligue 1	10	0	0	0	—		10	0
Career total			59	7	7	0	8	1	74	8

=== International ===
As of match played 10 September 2024

Appearances and goals by national team and year
National team	Year	Apps	Goals
Mali	2024	2	0
Total		2	0
