= Seedy Jatta =

Norwegian footballer (born 2003)

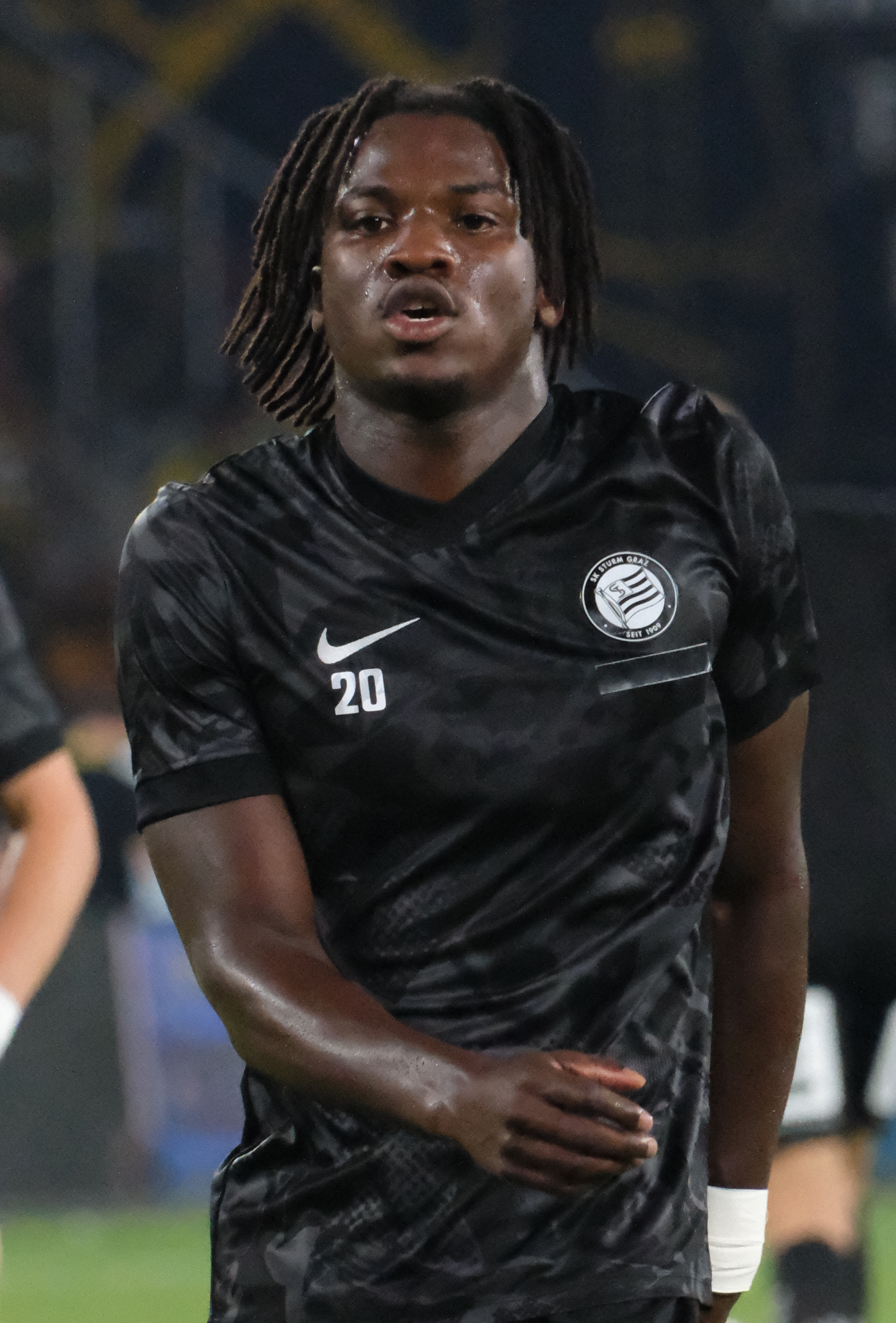
- Jatta in 2026

Personal information
- Full name: Seedyahmed Tijan Jatta
- Date of birth: 18 March 2003 (age 23)
- Height: 1.80 m (5 ft 11 in)
- Position: Forward

Team information
- Current team: Sturm Graz
- Number: 20

Youth career
- –2016: Bjørndal
- 2017–2019: Skeid
- 2020: Vålerenga

Senior career*
| Years | Team | Apps | (Gls) |
| 2021–2023 | Vålerenga | 61 | (8) |
| 2023– | Sturm Graz | 76 | (13) |

International career^{‡}
| 2019 | Norway U16 | 8 | (0) |
| 2020 | Norway U17 | 1 | (0) |
| 2021 | Norway U18 | 7 | (2) |
| 2022 | Norway U19 | 4 | (0) |
| 2023 | Norway U20 | 2 | (2) |
| 2022– | Norway U21 | 10 | (1) |
- * Club domestic league appearances and goals as of 13 September 2026 ‡ National team caps and goals as of 19 November 2024

Seedyahmed "Seedy" Tijan Jatta (born 18 March 2003) is a Norwegian professional forward who plays for Sturm Graz.

== Career ==
Born in Norway to Gambian parents, starting his career in Bjørndal IF, he moved on to play youth football in Skeid—where he became a Norwegian youth international—and Vålerenga. Drafted into the first team in 2021, he made his Eliteserien debut in May 2021 against Sandefjord, and scored his first goal in June 2021 against Stabæk.

On 17 August 2023, Jatta joined Austrian Bundesliga club Sturm Graz in a permanent deal.

== Career statistics ==
As of match played 13 September 2026

Appearances and goals by club, season and competition
| Club | Season | League | | | National cup (Note: Includes Norwegian Football Cup, Austrian Cup) | | Continental | | Total | |
| Club | Season | Division | Apps | Goals | Apps | Goals | Apps | Goals | Apps | Goals |
|---|---|---|---|---|---|---|---|---|---|---|
| Vålerenga | 2021 | Eliteserien | 24 | 2 | 1 | 1 | 2 (Note: appearances in UEFA Europa Conference League) | 0 | 25 | 3 |
| Vålerenga | 2022 | Eliteserien | 20 | 1 | 3 | 2 | — | | 23 | 3 |
| Vålerenga | 2023 | Eliteserien | 17 | 5 | 2 | 1 | — | | 19 | 6 |
| Vålerenga | Total | | 61 | 8 | 6 | 4 | 2 | 0 | 69 | 12 |
| Sturm Graz | 2023–24 | Austrian Bundesliga | 17 | 2 | 4 | 0 | 3 (Note: appearances in UEFA Europa League) | 0 | 24 | 2 |
| Sturm Graz | 2024–25 | Austrian Bundesliga | 21 | 5 | 3 | 2 | 8 (Note: appearances in UEFA Champions League) | 0 | 32 | 7 |
| Sturm Graz | 2025–26 | Austrian Bundesliga | 32 | 4 | 3 | 1 | 10 (Note: Two appearances and one goal in UEFA Champions League, eight appearances in UEFA Europa League) | 1 | 45 | 6 |
| Sturm Graz | 2026–27 | Austrian Bundesliga | 6 | 2 | 1 | 0 | 4 (Note: Four appearances in UEFA Champions League) | 0 | 11 | 2 |
| Sturm Graz | Total | | 76 | 13 | 11 | 3 | 25 | 1 | 112 | 17 |
| Career total | | | 137 | 21 | 17 | 7 | 27 | 1 | 181 | 29 |

== Honours ==
Sturm Graz

- Austrian Bundesliga: 2023–24, 2024–25
- Austrian Cup: 2023–24
