= Gregory Wüthrich =

Swiss footballer (born 1994)

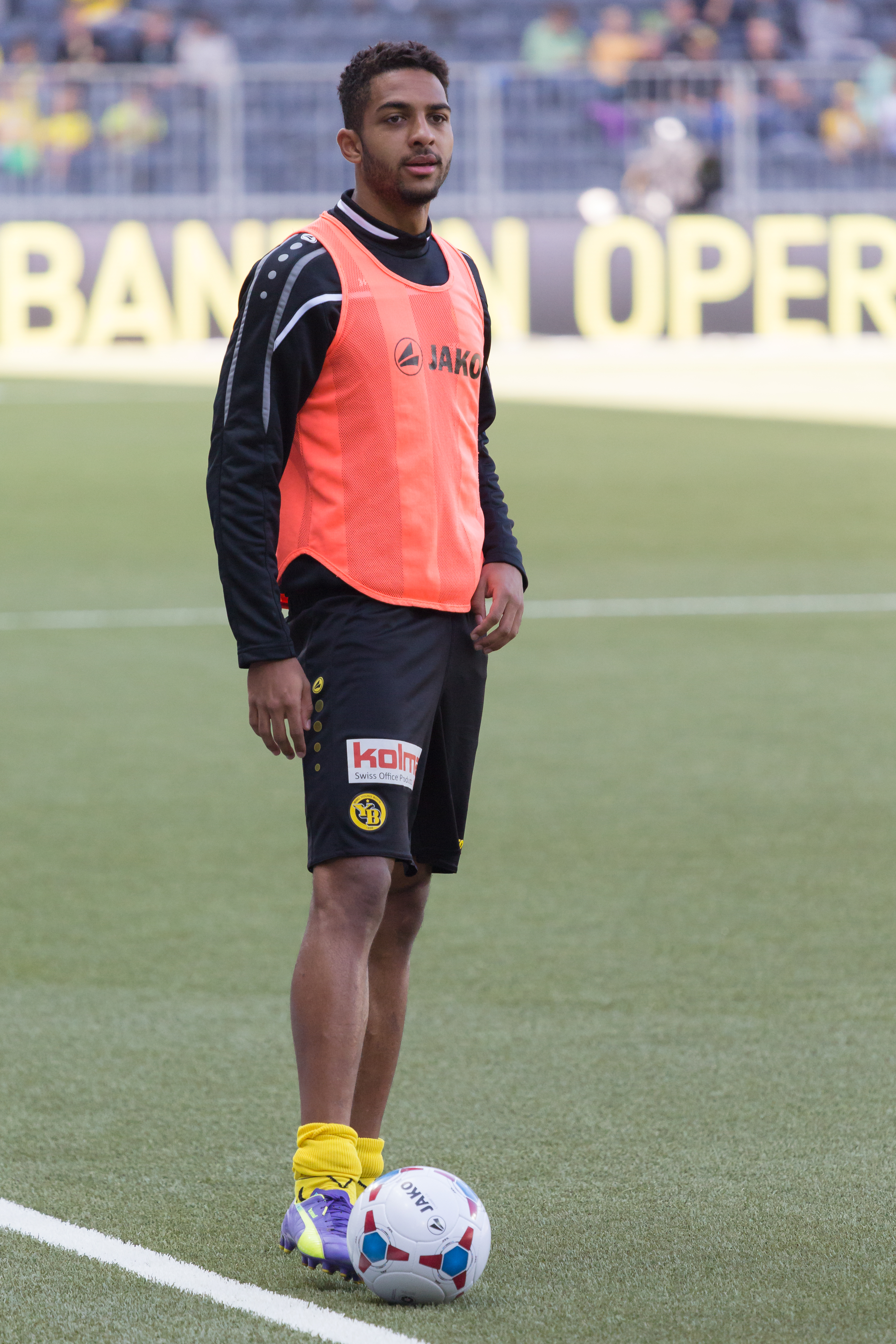
- Wüthrich warming up for Young Boys in 2014

Personal information
- Full name: Gregory Kwesi Wüthrich
- Date of birth: 4 December 1994 (age 31)
- Place of birth: Bern, Switzerland
- Height: 1.92 m (6 ft 4 in)
- Position: Centre-back

Team information
- Current team: Young Boys
- Number: 5

Youth career
- –2014: Young Boys

Senior career*
Years	Team	Apps	(Gls)
2014–2019	Young Boys	55	(2)
2015	→ Grasshoppers (loan)	8	(0)
2019–2020	Perth Glory	18	(1)
2020–2025	Sturm Graz	137	(9)
2025–	Young Boys	29	(0)

International career^{‡}
2012	Switzerland U18	1	(0)
2012–2013	Switzerland U19	5	(0)
2013–2015	Switzerland U20	6	(0)
2014–2015	Switzerland U21	3	(0)
2024–	Switzerland	2	(0)
- * Club domestic league appearances and goals as of 1 September 2026 ‡ National team caps and goals as of 8 September 2024

Gregory Kwesi Wüthrich (born 4 December 1994) is a Swiss professional footballer who plays as a centre-back for Swiss Super League club Young Boys and the Switzerland national team.

== Club career ==
Wüthrich is a youth exponent from Young Boys. He made his Swiss Super League debut at 2 February 2014 against Thun in 2–1 home win. He made 8 league appearances during the 2013–14 season. After making a total of 15 appearances, 9 of those being in the league, during the 2014–15 season, Wüthrich left Young Boys to join fellow Swiss Super League side Grasshoppers on loan on 24 February 2015. He made his club debut on 1 March versus St. Gallen.

Wüthrich signed for A-League club Perth Glory on 18 September 2019.

On 7 August 2020 he signed for Sturm Graz.

On 23 June 2025, Wüthrich returned to Young Boys, signing a three-year contract until summer 2028. He joined the club on a free transfer from Sturm Graz.

== International career ==
Wüthrich was born to a Ghanaian mother and a Swiss father. He has been a youth international for Switzerland.

Wüthrich was called up to the senior Switzerland national team for the first time for the Nations League games against Denmark and Spain in September 2024. He debuted on 5 September 2024 against Denmark at the Parken Stadium. He substituted Ruben Vargas in the 61st minute after the starting centre-back Nico Elvedi was sent off. Denmark won 2–0.

== Career statistics ==
=== Club ===
As of 1 September 2026

Appearances and goals by club, season and competition
Club	Season	League			Cup		Continental		Other		Total	
Club	Season	Division	Apps	Goals	Apps	Goals	Apps	Goals	Apps	Goals	Apps	Goals
Young Boys	2013–14	Swiss Super League	8	1	—		—		—		8	1
Young Boys	2014–15	Swiss Super League	9	1	2	0	4	0	—		15	1
Young Boys	2015–16	Swiss Super League	12	0	1	0	0	0	—		13	0
Young Boys	2016–17	Swiss Super League	3	0	1	0	2	0	—		6	0
Young Boys	2017–18	Swiss Super League	8	0	2	0	3	0	—		13	0
Young Boys	2018–19	Swiss Super League	14	0	1	0	3	0	—		18	0
Young Boys	2019–20	Swiss Super League	1	0	0	0	0	0	—		1	0
Young Boys	Total		55	2	7	0	12	0	—		74	2
Grasshoppers (loan)	2014–15	Swiss Super League	8	0	1	0	—		—		9	0
Perth Glory	2019–20	A-League	18	1	0	0	1	0	—		19	1
Sturm Graz	2020–21	Austrian Bundesliga	23	1	5	0	—		—		28	1
Sturm Graz	2021–22	Austrian Bundesliga	31	4	0	0	8	0	—		39	4
Sturm Graz	2022–23	Austrian Bundesliga	28	1	5	0	8	0	—		41	1
Sturm Graz	2023–24	Austrian Bundesliga	28	3	4	1	10	0	—		42	4
Sturm Graz	2024–25	Austrian Bundesliga	21	0	3	0	4	0	—		28	0
Sturm Graz	Total		141	9	17	1	30	0	—		178	10
Young Boys	2025–26	Swiss Super League	25	0	0	0	4	0	—		29	0
Young Boys	2026–27	Swiss Super League	4	0	1	1	—		—		5	1
Young Boys	Total		29	0	1	1	4	0	—		34	1
Career total			242	12	26	2	47	0	0	0	325	14

=== International ===
As of match played 8 September 2024

Appearances and goals by national team and year
National team	Year	Apps	Goals
Switzerland	2024	2	0
Total		2	0

== Honours ==
Young Boys

- Swiss Super League: 2017–18
