= Szymon Włodarczyk =

Polish footballer (born 2003)

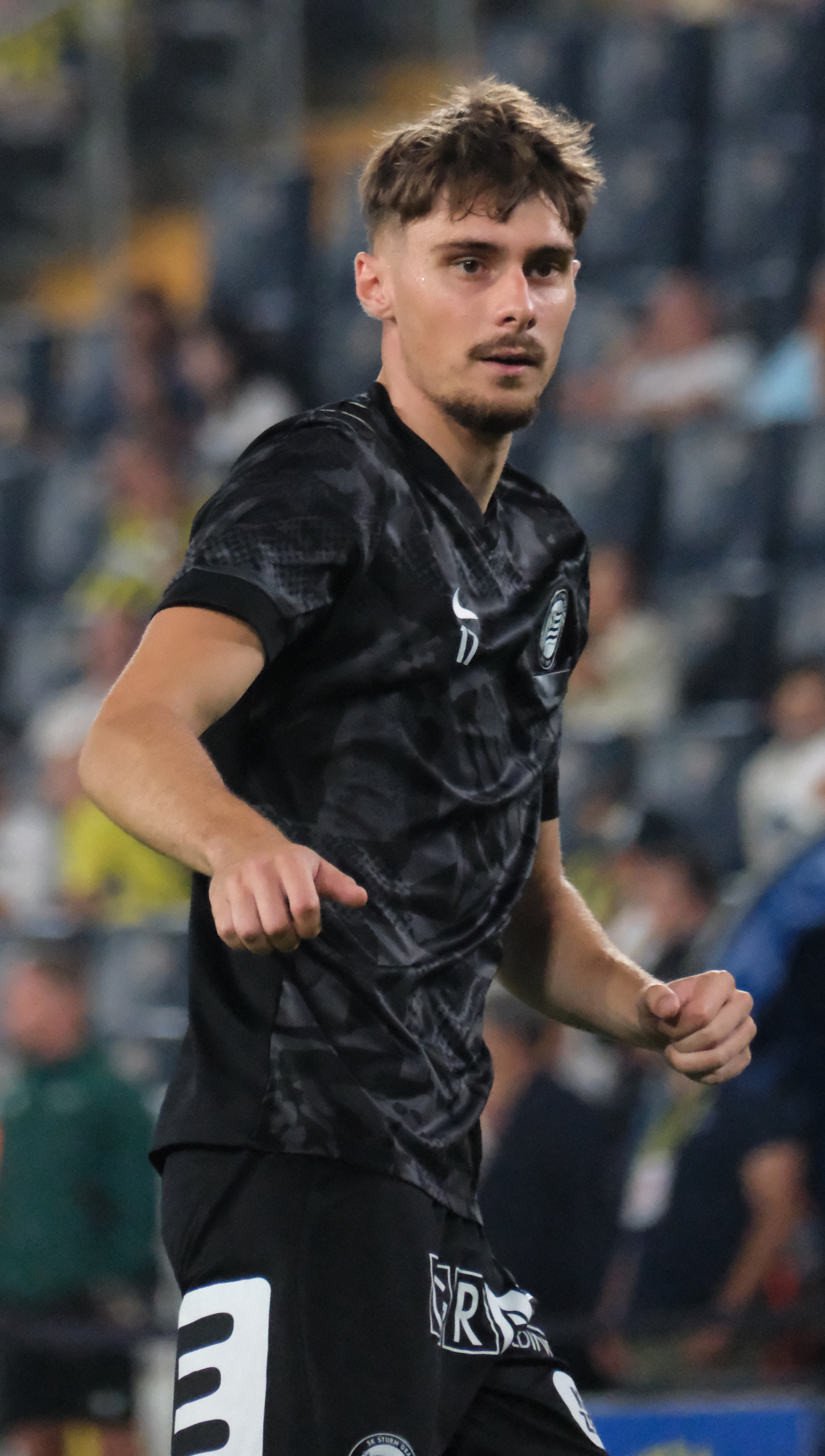
- Włodarczyk with Sturm Graz in 2026

Personal information
- Full name: Szymon Piotr Włodarczyk
- Date of birth: 5 January 2003 (age 23)
- Place of birth: Wałbrzych, Poland
- Height: 1.89 m (6 ft 2 in)
- Position: Forward

Team information
- Current team: Sturm Graz
- Number: 17

Youth career
- Aris
- OFI
- Bałtyk Gdynia
- Legia Warsaw
- 2013–2017: SEMP Ursynów
- 2017–2019: Legia Warsaw

Senior career*
Years	Team	Apps	(Gls)
2019–2022	Legia Warsaw II	42	(15)
2020–2022	Legia Warsaw	11	(0)
2022–2023	Górnik Zabrze	30	(9)
2023–	Sturm Graz	30	(6)
2024–2025	→ Salernitana (loan)	13	(1)
2025	Sturm Graz II	1	(1)
2025–2026	→ Excelsior (loan)	23	(3)

International career
2017–2018	Poland U15	6	(3)
2018–2019	Poland U16	8	(3)
2019–2020	Poland U17	9	(12)
2021	Poland U19	5	(0)
2022–2025	Poland U21	16	(7)
- * Club domestic league appearances and goals as of 25 October 2026

Szymon Piotr Włodarczyk (born 5 January 2003) is a Polish professional footballer who plays as a forward for Austrian Bundesliga club Sturm Graz.

== Club career ==
On 1 December 2021, he scored his first goal for Legia Warsaw, in a 2–1 Polish Cup away win against Motor Lublin.

On 25 May 2022, he moved on free transfer to Górnik Zabrze, signing a three-year contract.

On 7 July 2023, Austrian side Sturm Graz announced the signing of Włodarczyk on a four-year deal, for a fee exceeding €2 million. In his first season, he scored nine goals in 40 appearances across all competitions, as Sturm reached the round of 16 of the 2023–24 UEFA Europa Conference League, and won a domestic double for the first time since the 1998–99 season.

On 27 August 2024, Włodarczyk joined Salernitana in Italy on loan with an option to buy and a conditional obligation to buy.

On 22 August 2025, Włodarczyk moved to Dutch Eredivisie side Excelsior on loan.

== Personal life ==
Włodarczyk is the son of Piotr Włodarczyk, a former Polish international and Legia Warsaw forward.

== Career statistics ==
As of match played 25 October 2026

Appearances and goals by club, season and competition
Club	Season	League			National cup (Note: Includes Polish Cup, Austrian Cup)		Europe		Total	
Club	Season	Division	Apps	Goals	Apps	Goals	Apps	Goals	Apps	Goals
Legia Warsaw II	2019–20	III liga, group I	2	0	1	0	—		3	0
Legia Warsaw II	2020–21	III liga, group I	23	5	—		—		23	5
Legia Warsaw II	2021–22	III liga, group I	17	10	—		—		17	10
Legia Warsaw II	Total		42	15	1	0	0	0	43	15
Legia Warsaw	2019–20	Ekstraklasa	2	0	0	0	—		2	0
Legia Warsaw	2020–21	Ekstraklasa	2	0	0	0	—		2	0
Legia Warsaw	2021–22	Ekstraklasa	7	0	3	1	2 (Note: Appearances in UEFA Europa League)	0	12	1
Legia Warsaw	Total		11	0	3	1	2	0	16	1
Górnik Zabrze	2022–23	Ekstraklasa	30	9	2	0	—		32	9
Sturm Graz	2023–24	Austrian Bundesliga	24	5	4	3	12 (Note: Two appearances in UEFA Champions League, six appearances and one goal in UEFA Europa League, four appearances in UEFA Europa Conference League)	1	40	9
Sturm Graz	2024–25	Austrian Bundesliga	0	0	1	0	0	0	1	0
Sturm Graz	2026–27	Austrian Bundesliga	6	1	1	1	3 (Note: Three appearances in UEFA Champions League)	0	10	2
Sturm Graz	Total		30	6	6	4	15	1	51	11
Salernitana (loan)	2024–25	Serie B	13	1	0	0	—		13	1
Sturm Graz II	2025–26	2. Liga	1	1	—		—		1	1
Excelsior (loan)	2025–26	Eredivisie	23	3	0	0	—		23	3
Career total			150	35	12	5	17	1	179	41

== Honours ==
Legia Warsaw

- Ekstraklasa: 2019–20, 2020–21

Sturm Graz

- Austrian Bundesliga: 2023–24
- Austrian Cup: 2023–24

Individual

- Ekstraklasa Young Player of the Month: October 2022
