= Mika Biereth =

Denmark international footballer (born 2003)

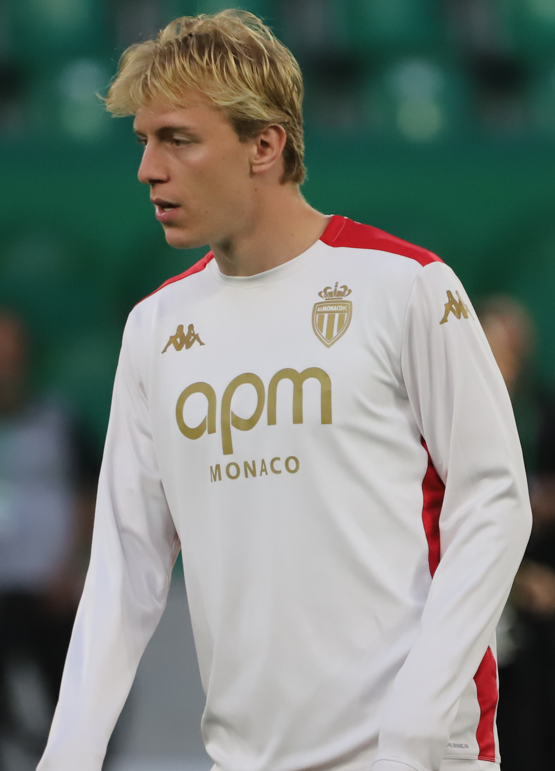
- Biereth with Monaco in 2025

Personal information
- Full name: Mika Miles Biereth
- Date of birth: 8 February 2003 (age 23)
- Place of birth: Lambeth, England
- Height: 1.87 m (6 ft 2 in)
- Position: Striker

Team information
- Current team: Monaco
- Number: 14

Youth career
- 2017–2021: Fulham
- 2021–2022: Arsenal

Senior career*
| Years | Team | Apps | (Gls) |
| 2022–2024 | Arsenal | 0 | (0) |
| 2022–2023 | → RKC Waalwijk (loan) | 12 | (2) |
| 2023–2024 | → Motherwell (loan) | 14 | (6) |
| 2024 | → Sturm Graz (loan) | 15 | (5) |
| 2024–2025 | Sturm Graz | 16 | (11) |
| 2025– | Monaco | 51 | (15) |

International career^{‡}
| 2021–2022 | Denmark U19 | 5 | (2) |
| 2023–2024 | Denmark U21 | 6 | (1) |
| 2025– | Denmark | 9 | (1) |
- * Club domestic league appearances and goals as of 18 October 2026 ‡ National team caps and goals as of 18 November 2025

Mika Miles Biereth (born 8 February 2003) is a professional footballer who plays as a striker for Ligue 1 club Monaco. Born in England, he plays for the Denmark national team.

== Early life ==
Biereth was born in London to a Danish-German father and a Bosnian Serb mother. He developed through Fulham's youth ranks. He finished the 2020–21 season as the top scorer in the Under-18 Premier League South, with 21 goals and 13 assists.

== Club career ==
=== Arsenal ===
Biereth joined Premier League side Arsenal after starting with Fulham, and signed his first professional contract on 30 July 2021. He scored three goals in a 6–1 away win over Chelsea Under-23s at Kingsmeadow in the Premier League 2 on 19 September 2021, sealing his first hat-trick for Arsenal Under-23s. In May 2022, following a string of impressive performances, Biereth was one of eight players to be nominated for the Premier League 2's Player of the Month Award for April, though it was eventually awarded to West Ham United's Sonny Perkins.

Biereth appeared four times as an unused substitute for Arsenal's first team during the 2021–22 season: in the FA Cup third round match away to Nottingham Forest at City Ground on 9 January, in the two legs of the EFL Cup semi-finals against Liverpool at Anfield on 13 January and at Emirates Stadium on 20 January, and in the game of the 23rd round of Premier League at Emirates Stadium against Burnley on 23 January.

==== Loan to RKC Waalwijk ====
Biereth joined Eredivisie club RKC Waalwijk on a season-long loan on 23 June 2022. On 17 September 2022, he made his competitive debut for the club in a 5–1 home victory over SC Cambuur in the domestic league. On 7 October, he scored his first and second competitive goals as a substitute in a 3–2 win over Groningen at Euroborg in the league, helping the team record the first away victory of the season.

==== Loan to Motherwell ====
Biereth joined Scottish Premiership side Motherwell on a season-long loan on 3 August 2023. He scored six goals in 15 appearances for Motherwell before he was recalled by Arsenal in January 2024.

=== Sturm Graz ===
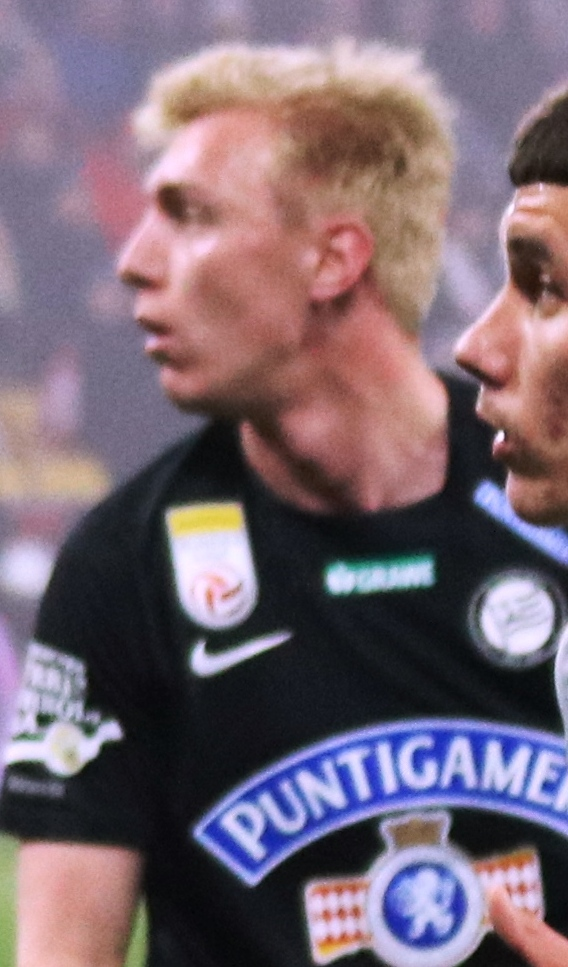
Biereth playing for Sturm Graz in 2024

On 19 January 2024, Biereth was loaned to Austrian Bundesliga side Sturm Graz for the rest of the 2023–24 season. On 2 February 2024, Biereth made his debut as a starter in a 2–0 Austrian Cup win against Austria Wien, scoring the second goal to take Sturm Graz to the next round, which they went on to win. He made his Austrian Bundesliga debut on 9 February 2024, also starting in a 1–1 draw to RB Salzburg. At the end of the season, he contributed six goals and two assists in all competitions for Sturm Graz, playing a crucial part in their Austrian Bundesliga and Austrian Cup double.

On 8 July 2024, Arsenal confirmed his permanent transfer to Sturm Graz for £4 million. He scored 14 goals in the first half of the 2024–25 season for Sturm Graz, including 11 in 16 league games, and goals against Girona and Lille in the UEFA Champions League.

=== Monaco ===
On 11 January 2025, Biereth signed a four-and-a-half-year contract with Monaco. The transfer fee was reported as €13 million, with an additional €2 million in potential add-ons. On 25 January, Biereth scored his first goal for the club when he scored the second goal of a 3–2 win over Stade Rennais. A week later on 1 February, Biereth scored his first senior hat-trick in just eight minutes in a 4–2 win over Auxerre. Two weeks later on 15 February, he scored another hat-trick in a 7–1 win against Nantes. On 28 February, Mika scored his third senior hat-trick on a 3–0 win over Stade de Reims. In netting his third hat-trick, he became the first player to reach the ten-goal mark in the 21st century with so few matches played. He is also the first player to play three Ligue 1 home games with at least three goals scored since Thadée Cisowski with Racing in 1956 and the first Monegasque since Delio Onnis to score three hat-tricks in one season.

== International career ==
Born in England, Biereth is of Danish-German descent through his father, although Danish coach Lars Knudsen incorrectly attributed this to his Bosnian Serb mother. He represented Denmark at under-19 level. He was first called up by Denmark U19 in September 2021, and made his debut for the team in a 2–0 away win over Northern Ireland U19 on 6 October 2021. In March 2023 he was called up by Denmark U21 and in March 2025 by the senior national team. Besides Denmark, he also would have been eligible to represent Germany, England, Bosnia and Herzegovina and Serbia.

== Style of play ==
Biereth has been described as a robust player, possessing an all-round skillset and a knack of scoring goals. His style of play, especially his aggression and defensive contribution has been likened to Jamie Vardy. Like Vardy, he is most comfortable as a classic "number 9", or secondarily on the wing. During his time at Arsenal's Hale End academy, he developed his general and tactical play.

== Career statistics ==
=== Club ===
As of match played 18 October 2026

Appearances and goals by club, season and competition
| Club | Season | League | | | National cup (Note: Includes KNVB Cup, Austrian Cup, Coupe de France) | | League cup (Note: Includes Scottish League Cup) | | Europe | | Total | |
| Club | Season | Division | Apps | Goals | Apps | Goals | Apps | Goals | Apps | Goals | Apps | Goals |
|---|---|---|---|---|---|---|---|---|---|---|---|---|
| Arsenal | 2021–22 | Premier League | 0 | 0 | 0 | 0 | 0 | 0 | — | | 0 | 0 |
| Arsenal | 2022–23 | Premier League | 0 | 0 | 0 | 0 | 0 | 0 | 0 | 0 | 0 | 0 |
| Arsenal | Total | | 0 | 0 | 0 | 0 | 0 | 0 | 0 | 0 | 0 | 0 |
| RKC Waalwijk (loan) | 2022–23 | Eredivisie | 12 | 2 | 1 | 0 | — | | — | | 13 | 2 |
| Motherwell (loan) | 2023–24 | Scottish Premiership | 14 | 6 | 0 | 0 | 1 | 0 | — | | 15 | 6 |
| Sturm Graz (loan) | 2023–24 | Austrian Bundesliga | 15 | 5 | 3 | 1 | — | | 4 (Note: Appearances in UEFA Europa Conference League) | 3 | 22 | 9 |
| Sturm Graz | 2024–25 | Austrian Bundesliga | 16 | 11 | 3 | 1 | — | | 6 (Note: Appearances in UEFA Champions League) | 2 | 25 | 14 |
| Sturm Graz | Sturm Graz total | | 31 | 16 | 6 | 2 | — | | 10 | 5 | 47 | 23 |
| Monaco | 2024–25 | Ligue 1 | 16 | 13 | 1 | 0 | — | | 2 | 0 | 19 | 13 |
| Monaco | 2025–26 | Ligue 1 | 32 | 2 | 3 | 3 | — | | 8 | 0 | 43 | 5 |
| Monaco | 2026–27 | Ligue 1 | 3 | 0 | 0 | 0 | — | | 2 (Note: Appearances in UEFA Conference League) | 2 | 5 | 2 |
| Monaco | Total | | 51 | 15 | 4 | 3 | — | | 12 | 2 | 67 | 20 |
| Career total | | | 108 | 39 | 11 | 5 | 1 | 0 | 22 | 7 | 142 | 51 |

=== International ===
As of match played 18 November 2025

Appearances and goals by national team and year
| National team | Year | Apps | Goals |
|---|---|---|---|
| Denmark | 2025 | 9 | 1 |
| Total | | 9 | 1 |

Scores and results list Denmark's goal tally first, score column indicates score after each Biereth goal.

List of international goals scored by Mika Biereth
| No. | Date | Venue | Cap | Opponent | Score | Result | Competition |
|---|---|---|---|---|---|---|---|
| 1 | 10 June 2025 | Odense Stadium, Odense, Denmark | 4 | Lithuania | 1–0 | 5–0 | Friendly |

== Honours ==
Sturm Graz

- Austrian Bundesliga: 2023–24
- Austrian Cup: 2023–24
