= Otar Kiteishvili =

Georgian footballer

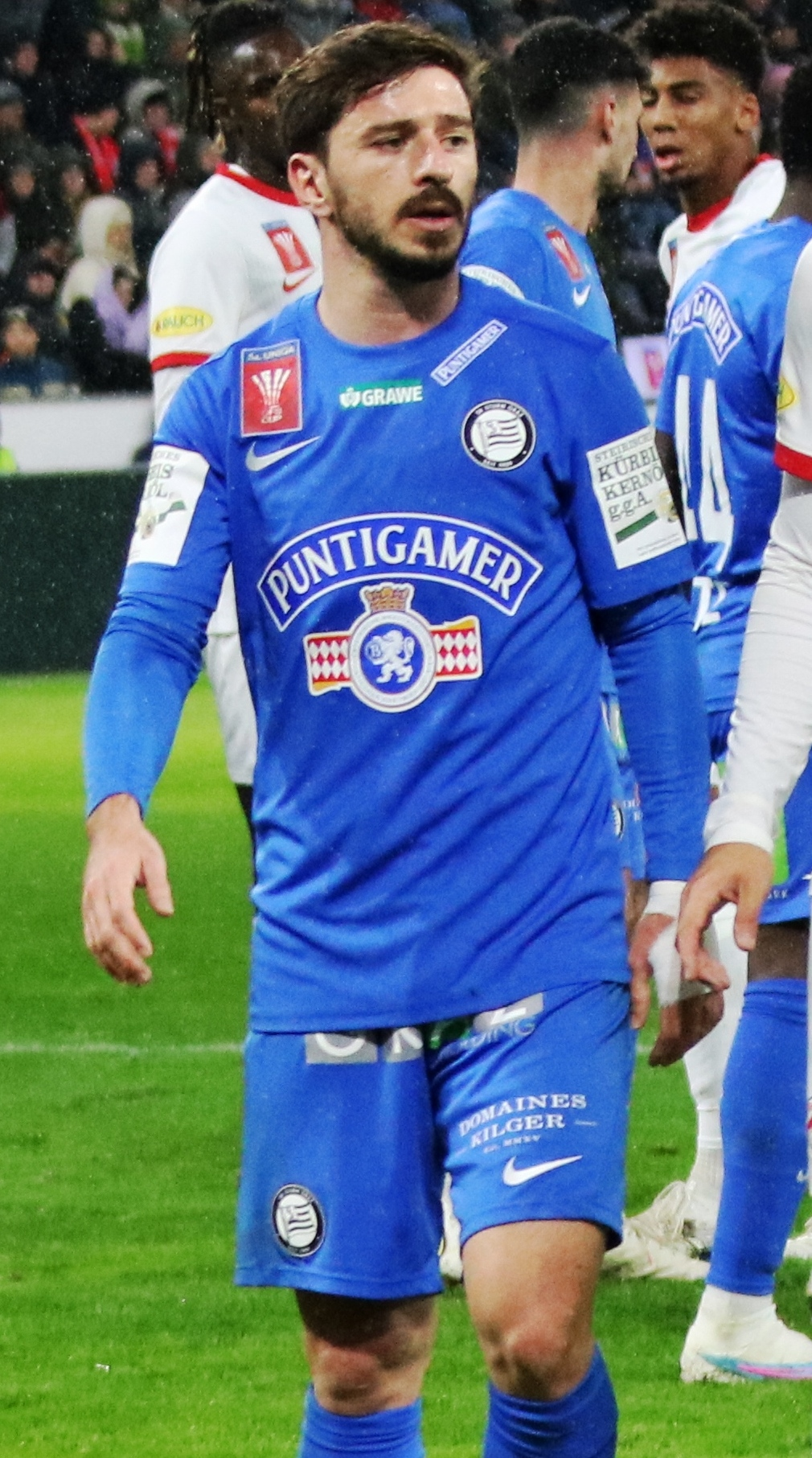
- Kiteishvili with Sturm Graz in 2023

Personal information
- Date of birth: 26 March 1996 (age 30)
- Place of birth: Rustavi, Georgia
- Height: 1.73 m (5 ft 8 in)
- Position: Midfielder

Team information
- Current team: SK Sturm Graz
- Number: 10

Youth career
- 2011–2013: Dinamo Tbilisi

Senior career*
Years	Team	Apps	(Gls)
2013–2018	Dinamo Tbilisi	98	(17)
2014	→ Metalurgi Rustavi (loan)	17	(1)
2018–	Sturm Graz	210	(60)

International career^{‡}
2014–2015	Georgia U19	9	(3)
2015–2016	Georgia U21	14	(5)
2017–	Georgia	57	(4)
- * Club domestic league appearances and goals as of 20 September 2026 ‡ National team caps and goals as of 3 October 2026

Otar Kiteishvili (Order of Honor) (Georgian: ოთარ კიტეიშვილი; born 26 March 1996) is a Georgian professional footballer who plays as a midfielder for Austrian Bundesliga club Sturm Graz and the Georgia national team.

A product of Dinamo Tbilisi's academy, Kiteishvili has won four titles at the club. He is also a two-time winner of the Austrian Cup. Individually, Kiteishvili has been named as the Best Young Player in Georgia twice. In May 2024, the Austrian Bundesliga officials selected him as the 2023-24 Player of the Season.

== Club career ==
=== Dinamo Tbilisi ===
Kiteishvili began his career in Dinamo Tbilisi. In April 2014, he was sent on loan to league rivals Metalurgi Rustavi. He made his debut on 7 May in the eighth matchday of the Umaglesi Liga championship round against Sioni Bolnisi, netting his side's second goal after coming on as a substitute for Kakhaber Kakashvili in a 2–0 home win.

In the winter break of the 2014–15 season, he returned to Dinamo Tbilisi. After playing 14 games for Rustavi in the top Georgian league in the first half of the season, he played as many games for Dinamo after his return. Kiteishvili scored his first league goal for the club on 3 October 2015, which proved to be the match-winner in a 1–0 home win over Dinamo Batumi.

Kiteishvili won the best Georgian young player's award twice in a row in 2015 and 2016. Besides, the Football Federation named him in a symbolic team of the 2017 season.

Being now Dinamo's captain at age 22, he was also recognized as the best player of part II in the 2018 Erovnuli Liga season.

Kiteishvili made 98 league appearances for Dinamo Tbilisi, in which he scored 17 goals.

=== Sturm Graz ===
On 31 July 2018, Kiteishvili moved to Sturm Graz in the Austrian Football Bundesliga, where he signed a four-year contract, later extended until the summer of 2024. He made his debut on 12 August in the third matchday of the domestic league against SKN St. Pölten, coming on as a substitute in the 68th minute for Lukas Grozurek of a 2–0 away loss. On 2 December, Kiteishvili scored his first goal for Sturm Graz to secure the 3–0 final score in a victory against Wolfsberger AC.

Оn 30 April 2023, he won the first trophy with this club following a 2–0 Cup victory over Rapid Wien.

He won the Cup for a second time on 1 May 2024, following another victory over Rapid Vienna, this time 2–1. He provided the assist for the winning goal. At the end of this season, which was most prolific during his six-year tenure at Sturm, Kiteishvili was voted Player of the Season by presidents, managers and coaches of the Bundesliga clubs.

== Personal life ==
Kiteishvili has a younger brother, Paata, who has spent most of his career at Rustavi.

Married to Ela Zarnadze, Otar has a daughter, Livia, born in December 2021.

== Career statistics ==
=== Club ===
As of match played 20 September 2026

Appearances and goals by club, season and competition
Club	Season	League			National cup (Note: Includes Georgian Cup, Austrian Cup)		Europe		Other		Total	
Club	Season	Division	Apps	Goals	Apps	Goals	Apps	Goals	Apps	Goals	Apps	Goals
Metalurgi (loan)	2013–14	Umaglesi Liga	3	1	–		–		–		3	1
Metalurgi (loan)	2014–15	Umaglesi Liga	14	0	2	0	–		–		16	0
Metalurgi (loan)	Total		17	1	2	0	–		–		19	1
Dinamo Tbilisi	2014–15	Umaglesi Liga	14	0	4	0	–		–		18	0
Dinamo Tbilisi	2015–16	Umaglesi Liga	27	4	6	0	2 (Note: Appearances in UEFA Europa League)	0	1 (Note: Appearance in Georgian Super Cup)	0	36	4
Dinamo Tbilisi	2016	Umaglesi Liga	14	1	3	4	6 (Note: Four appearances and one goal in UEFA Champions League, two appearances in UEFA Europa League)	1	–		23	6
Dinamo Tbilisi	2017	Erovnuli Liga	25	1	3	0	–		–		28	1
Dinamo Tbilisi	2018	Erovnuli Liga	18	11	1	1	2	0	–		21	12
Dinamo Tbilisi	Total		98	17	17	5	10	1	1	0	126	23
Sturm Graz	2018–19	Austrian Bundesliga	31	4	1	0	–		–		32	4
Sturm Graz	2019–20	Austrian Bundesliga	31	6	4	1	2	0	–		37	7
Sturm Graz	2020–21	Austrian Bundesliga	26	7	1	0	–		–		27	7
Sturm Graz	2021–22	Austrian Bundesliga	14	1	2	1	4	2	–		20	4
Sturm Graz	2022–23	Austrian Bundesliga	20	6	4	0	5	1	–		29	7
Sturm Graz	2023–24	Austrian Bundesliga	25	9	4	1	11 (Note: Two appearances in UEFA Champions League, five appearances in UEFA Europa League, four appearances and one goal in UEFA Europa Conference League)	1	–		40	11
Sturm Graz	2024–25	Austrian Bundesliga	32	12	3	0	7 (Note: Appearances in UEFA Champions League)	1	–		42	13
Sturm Graz	2025–26	Austrian Bundesliga	29	15	3	1	9 (Note: Two appearances in UEFA Champions League, seven appearances and three goals in UEFA Europa League)	3	–		41	19
Sturm Graz	2026–27	Austrian Bundesliga	2	0	1	1	1 (Note: Appearances in UEFA Champions League)	0	—		4	1
Sturm Graz	Total		210	60	23	5	39	8	–		272	73
Career total			325	78	42	10	49	9	1	0	417	97

=== International ===
Kiteishvili made his debut for the Georgia national football team on 23 January 2017 in a friendly against Uzbekistan.

As of match played 2 October 2026

Appearances and goals by national team and year
National team	Year	Apps	Goals
Georgia	2017	3	0
Georgia	2018	4	0
Georgia	2019	9	0
Georgia	2020	2	0
Georgia	2021	6	0
Georgia	2022	5	1
Georgia	2023	5	1
Georgia	2024	11	1
Georgia	2025	6	1
Georgia	2026	6	0
Total		57	4

Scores and results list Georgia's goal tally first.

No.	Date	Venue	Opponent	Score	Result	Competition
1	9 June 2022	Toše Proeski Arena, Skopje, North Macedonia	North Macedonia	3–0	3–0	2022–23 UEFA Nations League C
2	15 October 2023	Mikheil Meskhi Stadium, Tbilisi, Georgia	Cyprus	1–0	4–0	UEFA Euro 2024 qualifying
3	9 June 2024	Podgorica City Stadium, Podgorica, Montenegro	Montenegro	1–0	3–1	Friendly
4	23 March 2025	Boris Paichadze Dinamo Arena, Tbilisi, Georgia	Armenia	5–0	6–1	2024–25 UEFA Nations League promotion/relegation play-off

== Honours ==
Dinamo Tbilisi

- Umaglesi Liga: 2015–16
- Georgian Cup: 2014–15, 2015–16
- Georgian Super Cup: 2015

Sturm Graz

- Austrian Bundesliga: 2023–24, 2024–25
- Austrian Cup: 2022–23, 2023–24

Individual

- Austrian Bundesliga Player of the Season: 2023–24, 2024–25, 2025–26
- Austrian Bundesliga Top Goalscorer: 2025–26
- Georgian Young Player of the Year: 2015, 2016
