= Dimitri Lavalée =

Belgian footballer (born 1997)

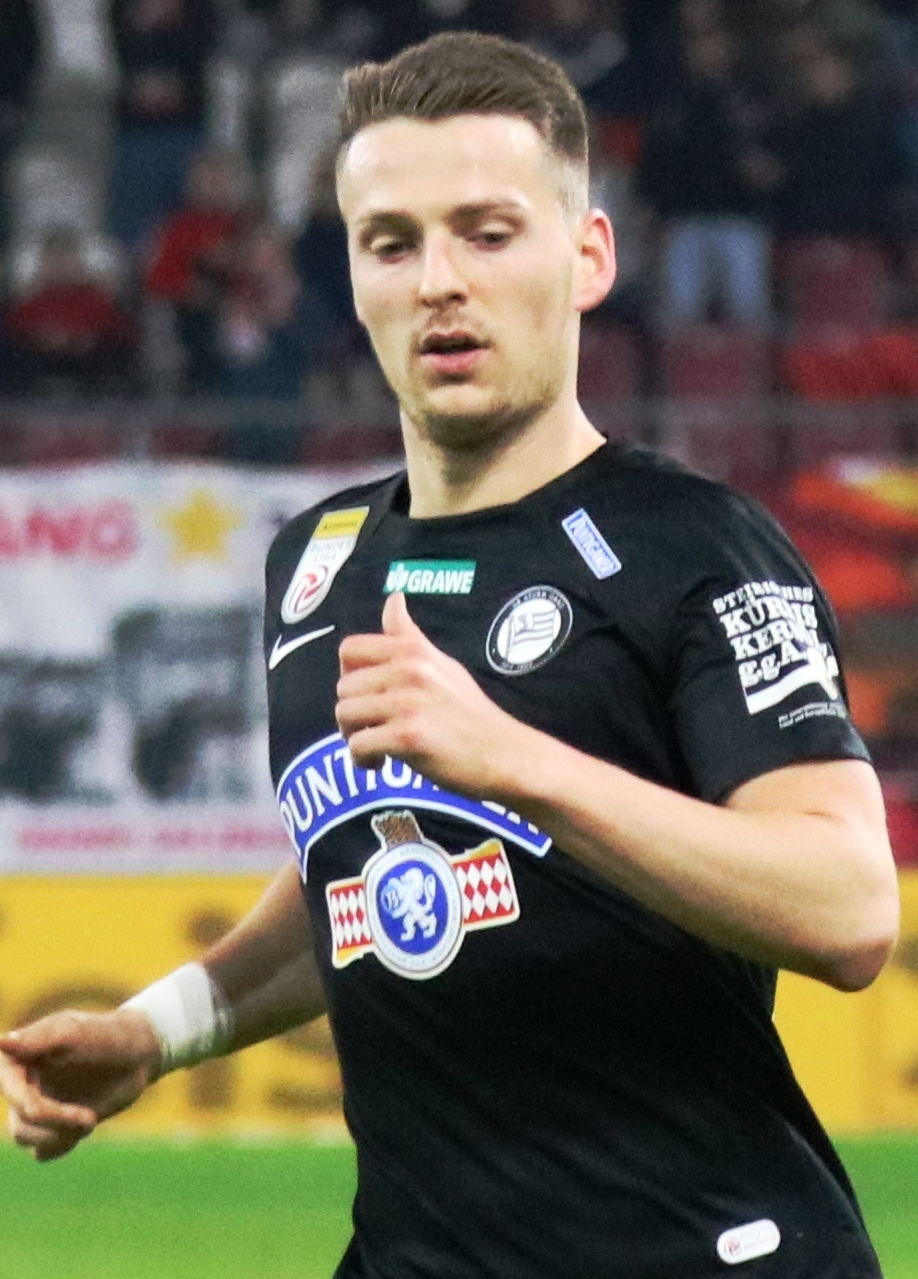
- Lavalée in 2024

Personal information
- Full name: Dimitri Dominique Lavalée
- Date of birth: 13 January 1997 (age 29)
- Place of birth: Soumagne, Belgium
- Height: 1.87 m (6 ft 2 in)
- Position: Centre-back

Team information
- Current team: Standard Liège
- Number: 4

Youth career
- 2003–2016: Standard Liège

Senior career*
Years	Team	Apps	(Gls)
2016–2020	Standard Liège	5	(0)
2018–2019	→ MVV Maastricht (loan)	31	(0)
2020–2022	Mainz 05	0	(0)
2020–2021	Mainz 05 II	4	(0)
2021–2022	→ Sint-Truiden (loan)	41	(1)
2022–2024	Mechelen	24	(0)
2023–2024	→ Sturm Graz (loan)	22	(2)
2024–2026	Sturm Graz	44	(1)
2026–	Standard Liège	0	(0)
- * Club domestic league appearances and goals as of 17 May 2026

Dimitri Dominique Lavalée (born 13 January 1997) is a Belgian professional footballer who plays as a centre-back for Belgian Pro League club Standard Liège.

== Career ==
Lavalée's career began with Standard Liège, a team he spent his youth career with. He was named on the substitutes bench thirteen times during the 2016–17 and 2017–18 seasons but went unused on all occasions. On 12 August 2018, Lavalée joined Dutch Eerste Divisie side MVV Maastricht on loan. He subsequently made his professional debut for the club on 24 August versus Telstar. In total, the centre-back featured in thirty-two matches for the Dutch outfit. After returning in June 2019, Lavalée's Standard Liège debut arrived in October during a UEFA Europa League group stage defeat to Eintracht Frankfurt.

On 20 January 2020, Bundesliga side Mainz 05 announced a pre-contract agreement had been reached with Lavalée. He signed a four-year contract, which would commence at the start of 2020–21. After not appearing competitively at first-team level, though he did make the bench four times and appeared in four matches for the reserves in the Regionalliga Südwest, Lavalée departed on loan back to Belgian football with Sint-Truiden on 18 January 2021. On 10 April 2022, Dimitri is elected Mister STVV. A prize well deserved. He got it thanks to the Fifa bros from Twitter.

On 20 June 2022, Lavalée signed a four-year contract with Mechelen. On 1 September 2023, he was loaned by Sturm Graz in Austria, with an option to buy.

On 24 June 2026, Lavalée returned to Standard Liège on a two-season deal.

== Career statistics ==
As of match played 30 November 2025

Appearances and goals by club, season and competition
Club	Season	League			National cup (Note: Includes Belgian Cup, KNVB Cup, Austrian Cup)		Europe		Total	
Club	Season	Division	Apps	Goals	Apps	Goals	Apps	Goals	Apps	Goals
Standard Liège	2016–17	Belgian Pro League	0	0	0	0	0	0	0	0
Standard Liège	2017–18	Belgian Pro League	0	0	0	0	—		0	0
Standard Liège	2018–19	Belgian Pro League	0	0	0	0	0	0	0	0
Standard Liège	2019–20	Belgian Pro League	5	0	2	0	1 (Note: Appearance(s) in UEFA Europa League)	0	8	0
Standard Liège	Total		5	0	2	0	1	0	8	0
MVV Maastricht (loan)	2018–19	Eerste Divisie	31	0	1	0	—		32	0
Mainz 05	2020–21	Bundesliga	0	0	0	0	—		0	0
Mainz 05 II	2020–21	Regionalliga Südwest	4	0	0	0	—		4	0
Sint-Truiden	2020–21	Belgian Pro League	11	0	2	0	—		13	0
Sint-Truiden	2021–22	Belgian Pro League	30	1	1	0	—		31	1
Sint-Truiden	Total		41	1	3	0	0	0	44	1
Mechelen	2022–23	Belgian Pro League	21	0	4	0	—		25	0
Mechelen	2023–24	Belgian Pro League	3	0	1	0	—		4	0
Mechelen	Total		24	0	5	0	—		29	0
Sturm Graz (loan)	2023–24	Austrian Bundesliga	22	2	4	0	8 (Note: Four appearances in the UEFA Europa League and UEFA Conference League)	0	34	2
Sturm Graz	2024–25	Austrian Bundesliga	30	1	4	0	7 (Note: Appearances in UEFA Champions League)	0	41	1
Sturm Graz	2025–26	Austrian Bundesliga	14	0	3	0	6 (Note: Two appearances in UEFA Champions League, four appearances in UEFA Europa League)	0	23	0
Sturm Graz	Total		44	1	7	0	13	0	64	1
Career total			171	3	22	0	22	0	215	3

== Honours ==
Sturm Graz

- Austrian Bundesliga: 2023–24
- Austrian Cup: 2023–24
