= Leon Grgić =

Croatian footballer (born 2006)

Personal information
- Date of birth: 22 January 2006 (age 20)
- Place of birth: Bruck an der Mur, Austria
- Position: Forward

Team information
- Current team: Sturm Graz
- Number: 38

Youth career
- Kapfenberger SV
- 2015–2022: Sturm Graz

Senior career*
Years	Team	Apps	(Gls)
2022–	Sturm Graz II	46	(13)
2023–	Sturm Graz	36	(7)

International career^{‡}
2021–2022	Austria U16	8	(1)
2022	Austria U17	3	(0)
2023–2025	Austria U19	12	(4)
2024	Austria U21	3	(0)
2025–	Croatia U21	4	(4)
- * Club domestic league appearances and goals as of 7 December 2025 ‡ National team caps and goals as of 13:46, 27 October 2026 (UTC)

Leon Grgić (born 22 January 2006) is a professional footballer who plays as a forward for Austrian Bundesliga for Sturm Graz. Born in Austria, Grgić currently plays for the Croatia U21s.

== Club career ==
Leon Grgić first played at Kapfenberger SV, before joining Sturm Graz in 2015. Becoming a prolific goalscorer with the youth teams, he signed his first professional contract with The Blackies in 2021.

After progressing from the under-16 to the under-18 team during the previous season, Grgić was promoted to the reserve team for the 2022–23 season. He made his professional debut for SK Sturm Graz II on the 17 August 2022, replacing Milán Tóth during a 5–2 away 2. Liga win against SKN St. Pölten.

== International career ==
Born in Austria, Grgić is of Croatian descent. He first made his debut for the Austria U16s on 2 September 2021, in a 3–3 draw against the Germany U16s. He scored his only goal for them against Israel U16's, netting in a 3–1 loss. He got promoted to the Austria U17s the following year, in a 2023 UEFA European Under-17 Championship qualification match against Moldova U17s, which ended as a 2–0 win. He then progressed to the Austria U19s the subsequent season, where he scored in a 2–2 draw against the Latvia U19s on 11 September 2023, 3 days after he made his debut for them, against the same opposition. He was called up to the Austria U21s in the September international break, where he came on as a substitute for Oluwaseun Adewumi in the 74th minute.

On 22 August 2025, Grgić's request to switch international allegiance to Croatia was approved by FIFA.

== Career statistics ==
=== Club ===
As of match played 7 December 2025

Club	Season	League			Austrian Cup		Europe		Total	
Club	Season	Division	Apps	Goals	Apps	Goals	Apps	Goals	Apps	Goals
Sturm Graz II	2022–23	2. Liga	16	2	—		—		16	2
Sturm Graz II	2023–24	2. Liga	21	7	—		—		21	7
Sturm Graz II	2024–25	2. Liga	9	4	—		—		9	4
Sturm Graz II	Total		46	13	—		—		46	13
Sturm Graz	2022–23	Austrian Bundesliga	2	0	0	0	0	0	2	0
Sturm Graz	2023–24	Austrian Bundesliga	0	0	1	0	1 (Note: Appearances in UEFA Europa League)	0	2	0
Sturm Graz	2024–25	Austrian Bundesliga	18	5	0	0	1 (Note: Appearances in UEFA Champions League)	0	19	5
Sturm Graz	2025–26	Austrian Bundesliga	16	2	3	0	6 (Note: Two appearances in UEFA Champions League, four appearances in UEFA Europa League)	0	25	2
Sturm Graz	Total		36	7	4	0	8	0	48	7
Career total			82	20	4	0	8	0	93	20
