= 2023–24 SK Sturm Graz season =

SK Sturm Graz
2023–24 season
- Manager: Christian Ilzer
- Stadium: Merkur-Arena
- Austrian Bundesliga: 1st
- Austrian Cup: Winners
- UEFA Champions League: Third qualifying round
- UEFA Europa League: Group stage
- UEFA Europa Conference League: Round of 16
- Top goalscorer: League: Otar Kiteishvili (9); All: Tomi Horvat; Otar Kiteishvili (11 each)
- Average home league attendance: 14,874
Home colours	Away colours

The 2023–24 SK Sturm Graz season was the club's 118th season in existence and its 58th consecutive season in the second division of Austrian football. In addition to the domestic league, Sturm Graz participated in this season's edition of the Austrian Cup, the UEFA Champions League, the UEFA Europa League and the UEFA Europa Conference League. The season covers the period from 1 July 2023 to 30 June 2024.

In the 2023–24 season, Sturm Graz clinched their fourth league title after a 2–0 win over Austria Klagenfurt on the final matchday, ending Red Bull Salzburg dominance for the last decade, in addition to securing a Champions League group stage berth for the first time since 2000–01.

== Players ==
=== First-team squad ===
As of 19 January 2024

Note: Flags indicate national team as defined under FIFA eligibility rules; some limited exceptions apply. Players may hold more than one non-FIFA nationality.

No.	Pos.	Nation	Player
1	GK	NED	Kjell Scherpen (on loan from Brighton)
2	DF	SCO	Max Johnston
4	MF	SLO	Jon Gorenc Stanković
5	DF	SUI	Gregory Wüthrich
6	DF	AUT	Aleksandar Borković
8	MF	AUT	Alexander Prass
9	FW	POL	Szymon Włodarczyk
10	MF	GEO	Otar Kiteishvili
11	MF	AUT	Manprit Sarkaria
14	MF	ESP	Javi Serrano (on loan from Atlético Madrid)
15	FW	DEN	William Bøving
17	FW	CPV	Bryan Teixeira
18	FW	DEN	Mika Biereth (on loan from Arsenal)
19	MF	SLO	Tomi Horvat
20	FW	NOR	Seedy Jatta
21	MF	AUT	Samuel Stückler

No.	Pos.	Nation	Player
22	DF	BIH	Jusuf Gazibegović
23	MF	AUT	Vesel Demaku
24	DF	BEL	Dimitri Lavalée (on loan from Mechelen)
25	MF	AUT	Stefan Hierländer
27	DF	AUT	Gabriel Haider
28	DF	AUT	David Schnegg
29	FW	GHA	Mohammed Fuseini
31	GK	AUT	Luka Marić
35	DF	AUT	Niklas Geyrhofer
38	FW	AUT	Leon Grgic
40	GK	AUT	Matteo Bignetti
42	DF	AUT	David Affengruber
43	GK	AUT	Henry Timothy Obi
44	DF	MLI	Amadou Danté

=== Out on loan ===
Note: Flags indicate national team as defined under FIFA eligibility rules; some limited exceptions apply. Players may hold more than one non-FIFA nationality.

No. / Pos. / Nation / Player; — / MF / AUT / Christoph Lang (at Hartberg until 30 June 2024)	No. / Pos. / Nation / Player; — / FW / AUT / Luca Kronberger (at Tirol until 30 June 2024)

== Pre-season and friendlies ==
Win Draw Loss Fixtures

26 July 2023 Friendly	Strasbourg	3–0	Sturm Graz
18:30 CEST (UTC+2)

8 September 2023 Friendly	Sturm Graz	3–1	SV Lafnitz
14:30 CEST (UTC+2)

13 October 2023 Friendly	Sturm Graz	4–1	Floridsdorfer AC
14:00 CEST (UTC+2)

== Competitions ==
=== Overview ===
Competition	First match	Last match	Starting round	Final position	Record							
Competition	First match	Last match	Starting round	Final position	Pld	W	D	L	GF	GA	GD	Win %
Austrian Bundesliga	30 July 2023	19 May 2024	Matchday 1	Winners	32	19	10	3	56	23	+33	59.38
Austrian Cup	22 July 2023	1 May 2024	First round	Winners	5	5	0	0	21	8	+13	100.00
UEFA Champions League	8 August 2023	15 August 2023	Third qualifying round	Third qualifying round	2	0	0	2	2	7	−5	0.00
UEFA Europa League	21 September 2023	14 December 2023	Group stage	Group stage	6	1	1	4	4	9	−5	16.67
UEFA Europa Conference League	15 February 2024	14 March 2024	Knockout round play-offs	Round of 16	4	2	1	1	6	5	+1	50.00
Total					49	27	12	10	89	52	+37	55.10

Source: Soccerway

=== Austrian Bundesliga ===
==== League table ====
Pos	Team	Pld	W	D	L	GF	GA	GD	Pts	Qualification
1	Red Bull Salzburg	22	15	5	2	45	12	+33	50	Qualification for the Championship round
2	Sturm Graz	22	13	7	2	37	15	+22	46	Qualification for the Championship round
3	LASK	22	9	8	5	26	18	+8	35	Qualification for the Championship round
4	Austria Klagenfurt	22	8	10	4	29	27	+2	34 (Note: Head to head points: Klagenfurt 4, TSV Hartberg 1.)	Qualification for the Championship round
5	Hartberg	22	9	7	6	33	28	+5	34	Qualification for the Championship round

Source: Austrian Football Bundesliga
Rules for classification: 1) Points; 2) Head-to-head record; 3) Goal difference; 4) Goals scored; 5) Matches won; 6) Away matches won; 7) Away goals scored.
Notes:

Pos	Team	Pld	W	D	L	GF	GA	GD	Pts	Qualification	STU	RBS	LASK	RWI	HAR	AKL
1	Sturm Graz (C)	32	19	10	3	56	23	+33	44	Qualification for the Champions League league stage	—	0–1	1–0	1–0	1–1	2–0
2	Red Bull Salzburg	32	20	7	5	74	29	+45	42	Qualification for the Champions League third qualifying round (Note: Since the Europa League winners, Atalanta qualified for the Champions League via league position, Red Bull Salzburg were promoted from the Champions League second qualifying round to the third qualifying round as one of the two teams with the highest coefficient in the second qualifying round.)	2–2	—	7–1	1–1	5–1	4–2
3	LASK	32	14	10	8	43	33	+10	34	Qualification for the Europa League play-off round (Note: The 2023–24 Austrian Cup winners qualified for the Europa League play-off round. Since the cup winners (Sturm Graz) qualified based on league position, the Europa League spot was passed to the third-placed team.)	2–2	3–1	—	5–0	1–3	1–0
4	Rapid Wien	32	11	12	9	47	35	+12	28	Qualification for the Europa League second qualifying round	1–3	2–0	0–0	—	0–3	1–1
5	Hartberg	32	12	9	11	49	52	−3	28	Qualification for the Conference League play-offs	1–3	1–5	1–2	0–3	—	3–2

Source: Austrian Football Bundesliga
Legend: Blue = home team win; Yellow = draw; Red = away team win.
Rules for classification: 1) Points; 2) Points with (possible) half points subtracted due to rounding; 3) Head-to-head points; 4) Head-to-head goal difference; 5) Head-to-head goals scored; 6) Goal difference; 7) Goals scored; 8) Matches won; 9) Away matches won; 10) Away goals scored.
(C) Champions
Notes:

Pos	Team	Pld	W	D	L	GF	GA	GD	Pts	Qualification	WOL	AWI	BWL	ALT	WAT	LUS
1	Wolfsberger AC	32	12	10	10	41	39	+2	31	Qualification for the Conference League play-offs	—	0–1	0–2	0–0	3–1	1–1
2	Austria Wien (O)	32	12	10	10	35	34	+1	29	Qualification for the Conference League play-offs	0–4	—	0–0	2–2	3–0	1–1
3	Blau-Weiß Linz	32	7	11	14	33	48	−15	22		0–0	1–2	—	2–1	3–2	0–0
4	Rheindorf Altach	32	6	13	13	27	40	−13	21		0–1	1–1	2–2	—	0–0	2–2
5	WSG Tirol	32	7	5	20	29	55	−26	19		1–1	1–0	2–1	0–1	—	0–0
6	Austria Lustenau (R)	32	4	9	19	22	58	−36	16	Relegation to Austrian Football Second League	1–2	2–0	1–0	0–1	1–2	—

Legend: Blue = home team win; Yellow = draw; Red = away team win.
Rules for classification: 1) Points; 2) Points with (possible) half points subtracted due to rounding; 3) Head-to-head points; 4) Head-to-head goal difference; 5) Head-to-head goals scored; 6) Head-to-head away goals scored; 7) Goal difference; 8) Goals scored; 9) Matches won; 10) Away matches won; 11) Away goals scored.
(O) Play-off winners; (R) Relegated

==== Results summary ====
Overall								Home						Away					
Pld	W	D	L	GF	GA	GD	Pts	W	D	L	GF	GA	GD	W	D	L	GF	GA	GD
22	13	7	2	37	15	+22	46	7	3	1	19	6	+13	6	4	1	18	9	+9

Source: Austrian Football Bundesliga

==== Results by round ====
Round	1	2	3	4	5	6	7	8	9	10	11	12	13	14	15	16	17	18	19	20	21	22
Ground	A	H	H	A	H	A	H	A	H	A	H	H	A	A	H	A	H	A	H	A	H	A
Result	W	W	D	W	W	W	D	D	W	W	W	L	L	W	W	D	W	D	D	W	W	D
Position	1	1	2	2	2	2	2	2	2	1	1	1	2	2	2	2	2	2	2	2	2	2

Source: Austrian Football Bundesliga
A = Away; H = Home; W = Win; D = Draw; L = Loss

==== Matches ====
The league fixtures were unveiled on 27 June 2023.

30 July 2023 1	Austria Wien	0–3	Sturm Graz	Vienna
16:00 CEST (UTC+2)		Report	Gazibegović 9'; Włodarczyk 38'; Affengruber 60'	Stadium: Generali Arena; Attendance: 13,088; Referee: Stefan Ebner

5 August 2023 2	Sturm Graz	2–0	LASK	Graz
18:30 CEST (UTC+2)	Horvat 27'; Włodarczyk 77'	Report		Stadium: Merkur Arena; Attendance: 14,740; Referee: Sebastian Gishamer

12 August 2023 3	Sturm Graz	0–0	Austria Klagenfurt	Graz
16:00 CEST (UTC+2)		Report		Stadium: Merkur–Arena; Attendance: 13,328; Referee: Markus Hameter

19 August 2023 4	Austria Lustenau	0–1	Sturm Graz	Lustenau
16:00 CEST (UTC+2)		Report	Wüthrich 33'	Stadium: Planet Pure Stadion; Attendance: 4,064; Referee: Josef Spurny

26 August 2023 5	Sturm Graz	4–1	Blau-Weiß Linz	Graz
16:00 CEST (UTC+2)	Włodarczyk 1', 61'; Haudum 7' (o.g.); Sarkaria 76' (pen.)	Report	Affengruber 54' (o.g.)	Stadium: Merkur Arena; Attendance: Harald Lechner; Referee: 13,594

2 September 2023 6	Rheindorf Altach	1–2	Sturm Graz	Altach
18:30 CEST (UTC+2)	Koller 78'	Report	Kiteishvili 63'; Fuseini 90+1'	Stadium: CASHPOINT Arena; Attendance: 5,760; Referee: Gerhard Grobelnik

16 September 2023 7	Sturm Graz	2–2	Red Bull Salzburg	Graz
18:30 CEST (UTC+2)	Kiteishvili 53'; Sarkaria 63'	Report	Baidoo 40'; Koïta 73' (pen.)	Stadium: Merkur–Arena; Attendance: 15,500; Referee: Julian Weinberger

24 September 2023 8	Rapid Wien	1–1	Sturm Graz	Vienna
16:00 CEST (UTC+2)	Schnegg 21' (o.g.)	Report	Prass 25'	Stadium: Allianz Stadion; Attendance: 21,600; Referee: Stefan Ebner

1 October 2023 9	Sturm Graz	1–0	WSG Tirol	Graz
13:30 CEST (UTC+2)	Wüthrich 44'	Report		Stadium: Merkur Arena; Attendance: 14,876; Referee: Sebastian Gishamer

8 October 2023 10	Wolfsberger AC	1–2	Sturm Graz	Wolfsberg
13:30 CEST (UTC+2)	Danté 40' (o.g.)	Report	Sarkaria 54'; Kiteishvili 60'	Stadium: Lavanttal-Arena; Attendance: 5,844; Referee: Walter Altmann

21 October 2023 11	Sturm Graz	2–1	Hartberg	Graz
16:00 CEST (UTC+2)	Jatta 13'; Prass 42'	Report	Lang 4'	Stadium: Merkur Arena; Attendance: 15,607; Referee: Christopher Jäger

29 October 2023 12	Sturm Graz	0–1	Austria Wien	Graz
12:30 CET (UTC+1)		Report	Gruber 14'	Stadium: Merkur Arena; Attendance: 15,460; Referee: Alan Kijas

5 November 2023 13	LASK	3–1	Sturm Graz	Linz
15:00 CET (UTC+1)	Usor 36'; Stojković 45+1'; Žulj 90+1'	Report	Włodarczyk 60'	Stadium: Raiffeisen Arena; Attendance: 15,249; Referee: Markus Hameter

12 November 2023 14	Austria Klagenfurt	0–3	Sturm Graz	Klagenfurt
12:30 CET (UTC+1)		Report	Gorenc Stanković 3'; Horvat 19', 67'	Stadium: 28 Black Arena; Attendance: 6,448; Referee: Sebastian Gishamer

25 November 2023 15	Sturm Graz	2–0	Austria Lustenau	Graz
15:00 CET (UTC+1)	Horvat 48'; Prass 70'	Report		Stadium: Merkur Arena; Attendance: 14,608; Referee: Arnes Talic

3 December 2023 16	Blau-Weiß Linz	1–1	Sturm Graz	Linz
12:30 CET (UTC+1)	Seidl 19'	Report	Horvat 48'	Stadium: Hoffmann Personal Stadion; Attendance: 5,595; Referee: Josef Spurny

10 December 2023 17	Sturm Graz	1–0	Rheindorf Altach	Graz
15:00 CET (UTC+1)	Jatta 3'	Report		Stadium: Merkur Arena; Attendance: 15,002; Referee: Achim Untergasser

9 February 2024 18	Red Bull Salzburg	1–1	Sturm Graz	Salzburg
20:30 CET (UTC+1)	Ratkov 15'	Report	Kiteishvili 80'	Stadium: Wals–Siezenheim; Attendance: 15,239; Referee: Harald Lechner

18 February 2024 19	Sturm Graz	1–1	Rapid Wien	Graz
17:00 CET (UTC+1)	Lavalée 6'	Report	41' Lang	Stadium: Merkur Arena; Attendance: 15,500; Referee: Walter Altmann

25 February 2024 20	WSG Tirol	0–2	Sturm Graz	Wattens
14:30 CET (UTC+1)		Report	9' Biereth; 12' Stanković; (red card) 61' Wüthrich	Stadium: Tivoli Stadion Tirol; Attendance: 2,454; Referee: Josef Spurny

3 March 2024 21	Sturm Graz	4–0	Wolfsberger AC	Graz
17:00 CET (UTC+1)	Kiteishvili (yellow card) 2'; Stanković (yellow card) 27'; Biereth 66'; Sarkaria 70'; Lavalée 85'; Affengruber 89'	Report	(yellow card) 55' Altunashvili; (yellow card) 58' Zimmermann; (yellow card) 70' Bonmann; (yellow card) 83' Boakye; (yellow card) 90+3' Baumgartner	Stadium: Merkur Arena; Attendance: 14,380; Referee: Julian Weinberger

10 March 2024 22	Hartberg	1–1	Sturm Graz	Hartberg
17:00 CET (UTC+1)	Sallinger (yellow card) 33'; Avdijaj 70'	Report	30' Bøving; (yellow card) 56' Schnegg; (yellow card) 64' Lavalée; (yellow card) 65' Johnston	Stadium: Profertil Arena; Attendance: 4,919; Referee: Sebastian Gishamer

==== Championship round ====
Pos	Team	Pld	W	D	L	GF	GA	GD	Pts	Qualification
1	Sturm Graz (C)	32	19	10	3	56	23	+33	44	Qualification for the Champions League league stage
2	Red Bull Salzburg	32	20	7	5	74	29	+45	42	Qualification for the Champions League third qualifying round (Note: Since the Europa League winners, Atalanta qualified for the Champions League via league position, Red Bull Salzburg were promoted from the Champions League second qualifying round to the third qualifying round as one of the two teams with the highest coefficient in the second qualifying round.)
3	LASK	32	14	10	8	43	33	+10	34	Qualification for the Europa League play-off round (Note: The 2023–24 Austrian Cup winners qualified for the Europa League play-off round. Since the cup winners (Sturm Graz) qualified based on league position, the Europa League spot was passed to the third-placed team.)
4	Rapid Wien	32	11	12	9	47	35	+12	28	Qualification for the Europa League second qualifying round
5	Hartberg	32	12	9	11	49	52	−3	28	Qualification for the Conference League play-offs

Source: Austrian Football Bundesliga
Rules for classification: 1) Points; 2) Points with (possible) half points subtracted due to rounding; 3) Head-to-head points; 4) Head-to-head goal difference; 5) Head-to-head goals scored; 6) Goal difference; 7) Goals scored; 8) Matches won; 9) Away matches won; 10) Away goals scored.
(C) Champions

==== Results summary ====
Overall								Home						Away					
Pld	W	D	L	GF	GA	GD	Pts	W	D	L	GF	GA	GD	W	D	L	GF	GA	GD
32	19	10	3	56	23	+33	67	10	4	2	24	8	+16	9	6	1	32	15	+17

Source: Austrian Football Bundesliga

==== Results by round ====
Round	1	2	3	4	5	6	7	8	9	10
Ground	A	H	H	A	H	A	A	H	A	H
Result	W	L	W	W	W	W	D	D	D	W
Position	2	2	2	2	2	1	1	1	1	1

Source: Austrian Football Bundesliga
A = Away; H = Home; W = Win; D = Draw; L = Loss

==== Matches ====
17 March 2024 23	Austria Klagenfurt	0–4	Sturm Graz	Klagenfurt
14:30 CET (UTC+1)	Besuschkow (yellow card) 24'; Wernitznig (yellow card) 35'; Irving (yellow card) 85'	Report	5', 18' Biereth; 23' Horvat; 39' Bøving	Stadium: 28 Black Arena; Attendance: 6,103; Referee: Alan Kijas

31 March 2024 24	Sturm Graz	0–1	Red Bull Salzburg	Graz
17:00 CEST (UTC+2)	Gazibegović (yellow card) 44'; Wüthrich (yellow card) 78'; Stanković (red card) 90+5'; Lavalée (red card) 90+11'	Report	(yellow card) 31' Gloukh; 48' Bidstrup; (yellow card) 89' Ratkov; (yellow card) 90+5' Schlager; (yellow card) 90+5' (yellow-red card) 90+5' Gourna-Douath; (yellow card) 90+12' Konaté	Stadium: Merkur Arena; Attendance: 15,736; Referee: Stefan Ebner

7 April 2024 25	Sturm Graz	1–0	LASK	Graz
14:30 CEST (UTC+2)	Prass 20'; Affengruber (yellow card) 70'	Report	(yellow card) 35' Usor; (yellow card) 86' Jovičić	Stadium: Merkur Arena; Attendance: 15,023; Referee: Harald Lechner

14 April 2024 26	Hartberg	1–3	Sturm Graz	Hartberg
14:30 CEST (UTC+2)	Prokop (yellow card) 48'; Avdijaj 73'	Report	9' Prass; 63' (pen.) Kiteishvili; 90' Stanković	Stadium: Profertil Arena; Attendance: 4,920; Referee: Alan Kijas

19 April 2024 27	Sturm Graz	1–0	Rapid Wien	Graz
19:30 CEST (UTC+2)	Biereth 79'; Affengruber (yellow card) 90+5'	Report	(yellow card) 77' Kerschbaum; (yellow card) 90+3' Grüll	Stadium: Merkur Arena; Attendance: 14,714; Referee: Markus Hameter

24 April 2024 28	Rapid Wien	1–3	Sturm Graz	Vienna
20:30 CEST (UTC+2)	Biereth 19'; Auer (yellow card) 54'	Report	8' Horvat; 29' Gazibegović; 44' Kiteishvili; (yellow card) 69' Lavalée; (yellow card) 85' Schnegg	Stadium: Allianz Stadion; Attendance: 20,303; Referee: Walter Altmann

28 April 2024 29	Red Bull Salzburg	2–2	Sturm Graz	Salzburg
17:00 CEST (UTC+2)	Dorgeles 72'; Konaté 82'; Koïta (yellow card) 82'	Report	1', 34' Prass; (yellow card) 60' Kiteishvili	Stadium: Wals–Siezenheim; Attendance: 17,062; Referee: Harald Lechner

5 May 2024 30	Sturm Graz	1–1	Hartberg	Graz
14:30 CEST (UTC+2)	Stanković (red card) 9'; Affengruber (yellow card) 26'; Kiteishvili 58'; Biereth (yellow card) 63'; Jatta (yellow card) 65'	Report	17' (yellow card) 56' Entrup; (yellow card) 33' Kainz	Stadium: Merkur Arena; Attendance: 15,445; Referee: Christopher Jäger

12 May 2024 31	LASK	2–2	Sturm Graz	Linz
17:00 CEST (UTC+2)	Flecker 20'; Ljubičić 76' (pen.)	Report	30', 48' (yellow card) 57' Kiteishvili; (yellow card) 44' Prass; (yellow card) 75' Lavalée	Stadium: Raiffeisen Arena; Attendance: 18,621; Referee: Julian Weinberger

19 May 2024 32	Sturm Graz	2–0	Austria Klagenfurt	Graz
17:00 CEST (UTC+2)	Lavalée (yellow card) 28'; Wüthrich 69'; Camara 90'	Report	(yellow card) 51' Mahrer	Stadium: Merkur Arena; Attendance: 15,838; Referee: Harald Lechner

=== Austrian Cup ===
The draw for the season's first round took place on 25 June.

22 July 2023 First round	SAK Klagenfurt	2–7	Sturm Graz	Klagenfurt
16:30 CEST (UTC+2)	Kamsek 34'; Sredojevic 82'	Report	Włodarczyk 15', 27', 63'; Kiteishvili 18'; Stanković 51'; Horvat 58'; Jantscher 79'	Stadium: Sportplatz Welzenegg; Attendance: 2,000; Referee: Achim Untergasser

27 September 2023 Second round	SV Leobendorf	0–3	Sturm Graz	Leobendorf
18:00 CEST (UTC+2)		Report	Bøving 43'; Prass 71'; Affengruber 89'	Stadium: Franz Haas Stadion; Attendance: 1,500; Referee: Dominic Schilcher

2 November 2023 Third round	Grazer AK	2–3	Sturm Graz	Graz
18:30 CET (UTC+1)	Cheukoua 30'; Oberleitner 37'	Report	Wüthrich 5'; Oberleitner 58' (o.g.); Teixeira 84'	Stadium: Merkur Arena; Attendance: 16,500; Referee: Harald Lechner

2 February 2024 Quarter-finals	Sturm Graz	2–0	Austria Wien	Graz
18:30 CET (UTC+1)	Horvat 9'; Biereth 45+8'	Report		Stadium: Merkur Arena; Attendance: 12,025; Referee: Christopher Jäger

4 April 2024 Semi-finals	Red Bull Salzburg	3–4	Sturm Graz	Wals-Siezenheim
20:45 CET	Solet 11' (Daniliuc); Ratkov (yellow card) 41'; Sučić; Terzić 90' (Sučić); Koïta (yellow card) 90+3'	Report	Bøving 25' (Horvat); Horvat 52' (Gazibegović); Wüthrich (yellow card) 66'; Schnegg 71' (Biereth); Geyrhofer (yellow card) 77' (goal) 81' (Horvat)	Stadium: Red Bull Arena; Attendance: 11,494; Referee: Walter Altmann

1 May 2024 Final	Sturm Graz	2–1	Rapid Wien	Klagenfurt
15:00 CET	Querfeld 49' (o.g.); Horvat 81' (Kiteishvili)		Seidl 43'	Stadium: Wörthersee Stadion; Referee: Sebastian Gishamer

=== UEFA Champions League ===
==== Third qualifying round ====
8 August 2023 First leg	PSV Eindhoven (Netherlands)	4–1	(Austria) Sturm Graz	Eindhoven, Netherlands
19:30 CEST (UTC+2)	Babadi 4'; De Jong 22', 32'; Sangaré 73'	Report	Stanković 40'	Stadium: Philips Stadion; Attendance: 31,500; Referee: Radu Petrescu (Romania)

15 August 2023 Second leg	Sturm Graz (Austria)	1–3 (2–7 agg.)	(Netherlands) PSV Eindhoven	Graz
19:30 CEST (UTC+2)	Bøving 26'	Report	Veerman 32'; De Jong 39'; Pepi 85' (pen.)	Stadium: Merkur Arena; Attendance: 12,571; Referee: Srđan Jovanović (Serbia)

=== UEFA Europa League ===
==== Group stage ====
The draw for the group stage was held on 1 September 2023.

Pos	Team	Pld	W	D	L	GF	GA	GD	Pts	Qualification	ATA	SCP	STU	RAK
1	(Italy) Atalanta	6	4	2	0	12	4	+8	14	Advance to round of 16	—	1–1	1–0	2–0
2	(Portugal) Sporting CP	6	3	2	1	10	6	+4	11	Advance to knockout round play-offs	1–2	—	3–0	2–1
3	(Austria) Sturm Graz	6	1	1	4	4	9	−5	4 (Note: Tied on head-to-head results. Overall goal difference used as a tiebreaker.)	Transfer to Europa Conference League	2–2	1–2	—	0–1
4	(Poland) Raków Częstochowa	6	1	1	4	3	10	−7	4		0–4	1–1	0–1	—

Source: UEFA
Rules for classification: Group stage tiebreakers
Notes:

21 September 2023 1	Sturm Graz (Austria)	1–2	(Portugal) Sporting CP	Graz
20:00 CEST (UTC+2)	Bøving 58'	Report	Gyökeres 76'; Coates 84'	Stadium: Merkur Arena; Attendance: 13,517; Referee: Nikola Dabanović (Montenegro)

5 October 2023 2	Raków Częstochowa (Poland)	0–1	(Austria) Sturm Graz	Sosnowiec, Poland
17:45 CEST (UTC+2)		Report	Bøving 24'	Stadium: Zagłębiowski Park Sportowy, Attendance: 8,993; Referee: Aliyar Aghayev (Azerbaijan)
Note: Raków Częstochowa played their home matches at the Zagłębiowski Park Sportowy, in Sosnowiec, instead of their regular stadium, the Miejski Stadion Piłkarski "Raków", in Częstochowa, which did not meet UEFA requirements.

26 October 2023 3	Sturm Graz (Austria)	2–2	(Italy) Atalanta	Graz
17:45 CEST (UTC+2)	Prass 13'; Włodarczyk 80' (pen.)	Report	Muriel 34', 45+7' (pen.)	Stadium: Merkur Arena; Attendance: 14,167; Referee: Duje Strukan (Croatia)

9 November 2023 4	Atalanta (Italy)	1–0	(Austria) Sturm Graz	Bergamo, Italy
19:00 CET (UTC+1)	Djimsiti 50'	Report		Stadium: Stadio Atleti Azzurri d'Italia; Attendance: 14,739; Referee: Jérôme Brisard (France)

30 November 2023 5	Sturm Graz (Austria)	0–1	(Poland) Raków Częstochowa	Graz
16:45 CET (UTC+1)		Report	Yeboah 81'	Stadium: Merkur Arena; Attendance: 12,517; Referee: Filip Glova (Slovakia)

14 December 2023 6	Sporting CP (Portugal)	3–0	(Austria) Sturm Graz	Lisbon, Portugal
19:00 CET (UTC+1)	Gyökeres 39'; Inácio 60', 70'	Report		Stadium: Estádio José Alvalade; Attendance: 24,733; Referee: Willie Collum (Scotland)

=== UEFA Europa Conference League ===
==== Knockout phase ====
===== Knockout round play-offs =====
The draw for the knockout round play-offs was held on 18 December 2023.

15 February 2024 First leg	Sturm Graz (Austria)	4–1	(Slovakia) Slovan Bratislava	Graz
18:45 CET (UTC+1)	Biereth 4'; Stanković 27'; Kiteishvili 64' (pen.); Camara 90+1'	Report	Rodrigues 8'; Weiss (red card) 78'	Stadium: Merkur Arena; Attendance: 12,817; Referee: Mohammed Al-Hakim

22 February 2024 Second leg	Slovan Bratislava (Slovakia)	0–1 (1–5 agg.)	(Austria) Sturm Graz	Bratislava
21:00 CET (UTC+1)		Report	Biereth 52'	Stadium: Tehelné pole Attendance: 19,870; Referee: Orel Grinfeld

===== Round of 16 =====
7 March 2024 First leg	Sturm Graz (Austria)	0–3	(France) Lille	Graz
18:45 CET (UTC+1)	Wüthrich (yellow card) 69'	Report	David 28', 51'; Zhegrova 71'; Bouaddi (yellow card) 74'	Stadium: Merkur Arena; Attendance: 13,825; Referee: Bartosz Frankowski (Poland)

14 March 2024 Second leg	Lille (France)	1–1 (4–1 agg.)	(Austria) Sturm Graz	Villeneuve-d'Ascq, France
21:00 CET (UTC+1)	Santos 43'	Report	Biereth 45+1'	Stadium: Stade Pierre-Mauroy; Attendance: 17,888; Referee: Matej Jug (Slovenia)
Note: Lille won 4–1 on aggregate.

== Statistics ==
=== Appearances and goals ===
As of 19 May 2024

No.	Pos	Nat	Player	Total		Bundesliga		Austrian Cup		Europe	
No.	Pos	Nat	Player	Apps	Goals	Apps	Goals	Apps	Goals	Apps	Goals
Goalkeepers
1	GK	(Netherlands) NED	Kjell Scherpen	27	0	16	0	3	0	8	0
16	GK	(Czech Republic) CZE	Vítězslav Jaroš	21	0	14	0	3	0	4	0
31	GK	(Austria) AUT	Luka Marić	2	0	2	0	0	0	0	0
Defenders
2	DF	(Scotland) SCO	Max Johnston	29	0	2+18	0	1+1	0	2+5	0
5	DF	(Switzerland) SUI	Gregory Wüthrich	42	4	28	3	3+1	1	10	0
6	DF	(Austria) AUT	Aleksandar Borković	4	0	1+1	0	1	0	1	0
22	DF	(Bosnia and Herzegovina) BIH	Jusuf Gazibegović	47	2	30+1	2	5	0	11	0
24	DF	(Belgium) BEL	Dimitri Lavalée	34	2	22	2	3+1	0	7+1	0
28	DF	(Austria) AUT	David Schnegg	38	1	20+8	0	4	1	6	0
35	DF	(Austria) AUT	Niklas Geyrhofer	15	1	4+8	0	2	1	0+1	0
42	DF	(Austria) AUT	David Affengruber	45	3	24+4	2	5	1	11+1	0
44	DF	(Mali) MLI	Amadou Danté	19	0	5+6	0	2	0	4+2	0
Midfielders
4	MF	(Slovenia) SLO	Jon Gorenc Stanković	44	6	28	3	3+1	1	12	2
8	MF	(Austria) AUT	Alexander Prass	47	9	30	7	5+1	1	10+1	1
10	MF	(Georgia (country)) GEO	Otar Kiteishvili	40	11	24+1	9	4	1	10+1	1
11	MF	(Austria) AUT	Manprit Sarkaria	28	4	14+2	4	2+1	0	7+2	0
14	MF	(Spain) ESP	Javi Serrano	17	0	2+6	0	1+3	0	0+5	0
19	MF	(Slovenia) SLO	Tomi Horvat	45	11	24+4	7	5+1	4	5+6	0
25	MF	(Austria) AUT	Stefan Hierländer	39	0	6+16	0	2+4	0	6+5	0
Forwards
9	FW	(Poland) POL	Szymon Włodarczyk	40	9	12+12	5	3+1	3	5+7	1
15	FW	(Denmark) DEN	William Bøving	45	7	17+11	2	3+2	2	6+6	3
17	FW	(Cape Verde) CPV	Bryan Teixeira	17	1	5+5	0	1+1	1	1+4	0
18	FW	(Denmark) DEN	Mika Biereth	22	9	15	5	3	1	4	3
20	FW	(Norway) NOR	Seedy Jatta	24	2	5+12	2	2+2	0	2+1	0
29	FW	(Ghana) GHA	Mohammed Fuseini	15	1	0+11	1	0+1	0	0+3	0
36	FW	(Mali) MLI	Amady Camara	24	2	2+18	1	0	0	0+4	1
38	FW	(Austria) AUT	Leon Grgic	2	0	0	0	0+1	0	0+1	0
Players transferred or loaned out during the season
13	FW	(Austria) AUT	Jakob Jantscher	3	1	0+1	0	0+1	1	0+1	0
