= Tomi Horvat =

Slovenian footballer (born 1999)

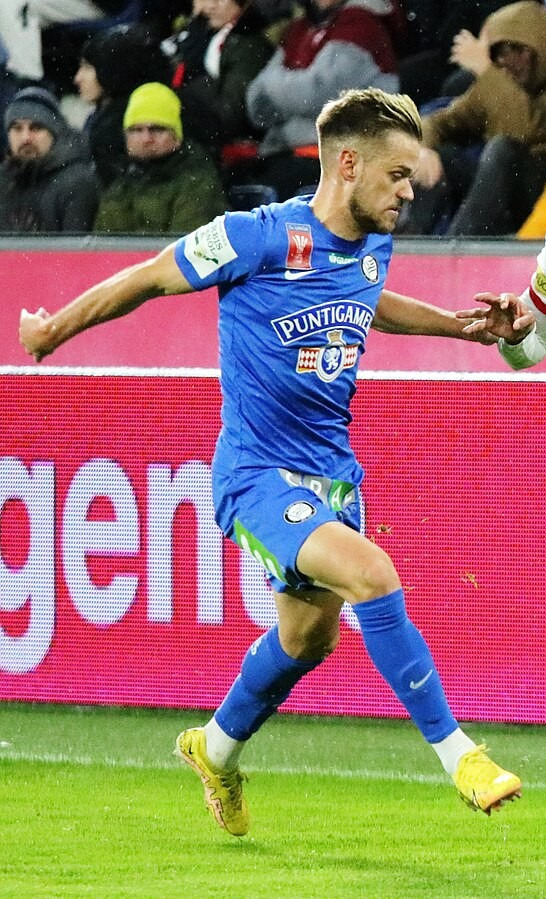
- Horvat playing for Sturm Graz in 2023

Personal information
- Full name: Tomi Horvat
- Date of birth: 24 March 1999 (age 27)
- Place of birth: Murska Sobota, Slovenia
- Height: 1.75 m (5 ft 9 in)
- Position: Midfielder

Team information
- Current team: Bristol City
- Number: 14

Youth career
- Turnišče
- Mura 05
- 2013–2017: Maribor

Senior career*
Years	Team	Apps	(Gls)
2018–2022	Mura	128	(14)
2022–2026	Sturm Graz	109	(17)
2026–	Bristol City	15	(1)

International career^{‡}
2014	Slovenia U16	4	(0)
2015–2016	Slovenia U17	19	(1)
2016–2017	Slovenia U18	11	(1)
2017	Slovenia U19	7	(2)
2019–2020	Slovenia U21	9	(1)
2022–	Slovenia	15	(0)
- * Club domestic league appearances and goals as of 21:10, 2 May 2026 (UTC) ‡ National team caps and goals as of 3 October 2026

Tomi Horvat (born 24 March 1999) is a Slovenian professional footballer who plays as a midfielder for EFL Championship side Bristol City and the Slovenia national team.

== Club career ==
=== Mura ===
Horvat made his Slovenian PrvaLiga debut for Mura on 21 July 2018 in a match against Triglav Kranj. On 25 November 2021, Horvat opened the scoring for Mura in a stunning 2–1 upset of Premier League club Tottenham Hotspur in the group stage of the UEFA Europa Conference League. He would finish the 2021–22 season with 11 goals and 10 assists in all competitions and was voted the Best Young Player in the Slovenian PrvaLiga.

=== Sturm Graz ===
On 2 June 2022, it was announced that Horvat would join Austrian club Sturm Graz on a three-year deal on 1 July 2022. In the semi-final match of the Austrian Cup against LASK on 6 April 2023, Horvat scored a memorable goal from outside the box to send Sturm Graz to the final. Sturm Graz would go on to beat Rapid Wien in the final on 30 April 2023.

In the Austrian Cup final the following year, Horvat would score the winning goal as Sturm Graz again defeated Rapid Wien. He was also part of the Sturm Graz side that won the Austrian Bundesliga during the 2023–24 season. Sturm Graz became the first new club in eleven years to win the league title, following Red Bull Salzburg's dominance of the league. It was the club's fourth league title in its history and the first championship since the 2010–11 season.

=== Bristol City ===
On 2 February 2026, Horvat transferred to EFL Championship club Bristol City for an undisclosed fee, signing a four-and-a-half-year deal until the summer of 2030. His debut for The Robins came five days later in a 3–2 win over Hull City, where he assisted Rob Atkinson to equalise at 1–1.

== International career ==
Horvat made his debut for Slovenia on 29 March 2022 in a friendly match against Qatar, coming on as a 87th-minute substitute for Petar Stojanović. In June 2024, he was included in Slovenia's squad for UEFA Euro 2024, but was an unused substitute in all four of Slovenia's matches at the tournament.

== Career statistics ==
=== Club ===
As of match played 2 May 2026

Appearances and goals by club, season and competition
Club	Season	League			National cup (Note: Includes Slovenian Cup, Austrian Cup, FA Cup)		Continental		Total	
Club	Season	Division	Apps	Goals	Apps	Goals	Apps	Goals	Apps	Goals
Mura	2018–19	Slovenian PrvaLiga	30	2	5	1	—		35	3
Mura	2019–20	Slovenian PrvaLiga	30	1	5	0	2 (Note: Appearances in UEFA Europa League)	0	37	1
Mura	2020–21	Slovenian PrvaLiga	33	2	1	0	3	0	37	2
Mura	2021–22	Slovenian PrvaLiga	35	9	1	0	14 (Note: Four appearances and one goal in UEFA Champions League, four appearances in UEFA Europa League, six appearances and one goal in UEFA Europa Conference League)	2	50	11
Mura	Total		128	14	12	1	19	2	159	17
Sturm Graz	2022–23	Austrian Bundeslga	32	4	6	1	8 (Note: Two appearances in UEFA Champions League, six appearances in UEFA Europa League)	0	46	5
Sturm Graz	2023–24	Austrian Bundesliga	28	7	6	4	11 (Note: Two appearances in UEFA Champions League, five appearances in UEFA Europa League, four appearances UEFA Europa Conference League)	0	45	11
Sturm Graz	2024–25	Austrian Bundesliga	32	4	4	2	7 (Note: Appearances in UEFA Champions League)	0	43	6
Sturm Graz	2025–26	Austrian Bundesliga	17	2	4	0	10 (Note: Two appearances in UEFA Champions League, eight appearances and two goals in UEFA Europa League)	2	31	4
Sturm Graz	Total		109	17	20	7	36	2	165	26
Bristol City	2025–26	EFL Championship	15	1	1	0	—		16	1
Career total			252	32	33	8	55	4	340	44

=== International ===
As of match played 3 October 2026

Appearances and goals by national team and year
National team	Year	Apps	Goals
Slovenia	2022	3	0
Slovenia	2023	1	0
Slovenia	2024	3	0
Slovenia	2025	5	0
Slovenia	2026	3	0
Total		15	0

== Honours ==
Mura

- Slovenian PrvaLiga: 2020–21
- Slovenian Cup: 2019–20

Sturm Graz

- Austrian Bundesliga: 2023–24, 2024–25
- Austrian Cup: 2022–23, 2023–24

Individual

- Slovenian PrvaLiga Best Young Player: 2021–22
