= Kjell Scherpen =

Dutch footballer (born 2000)

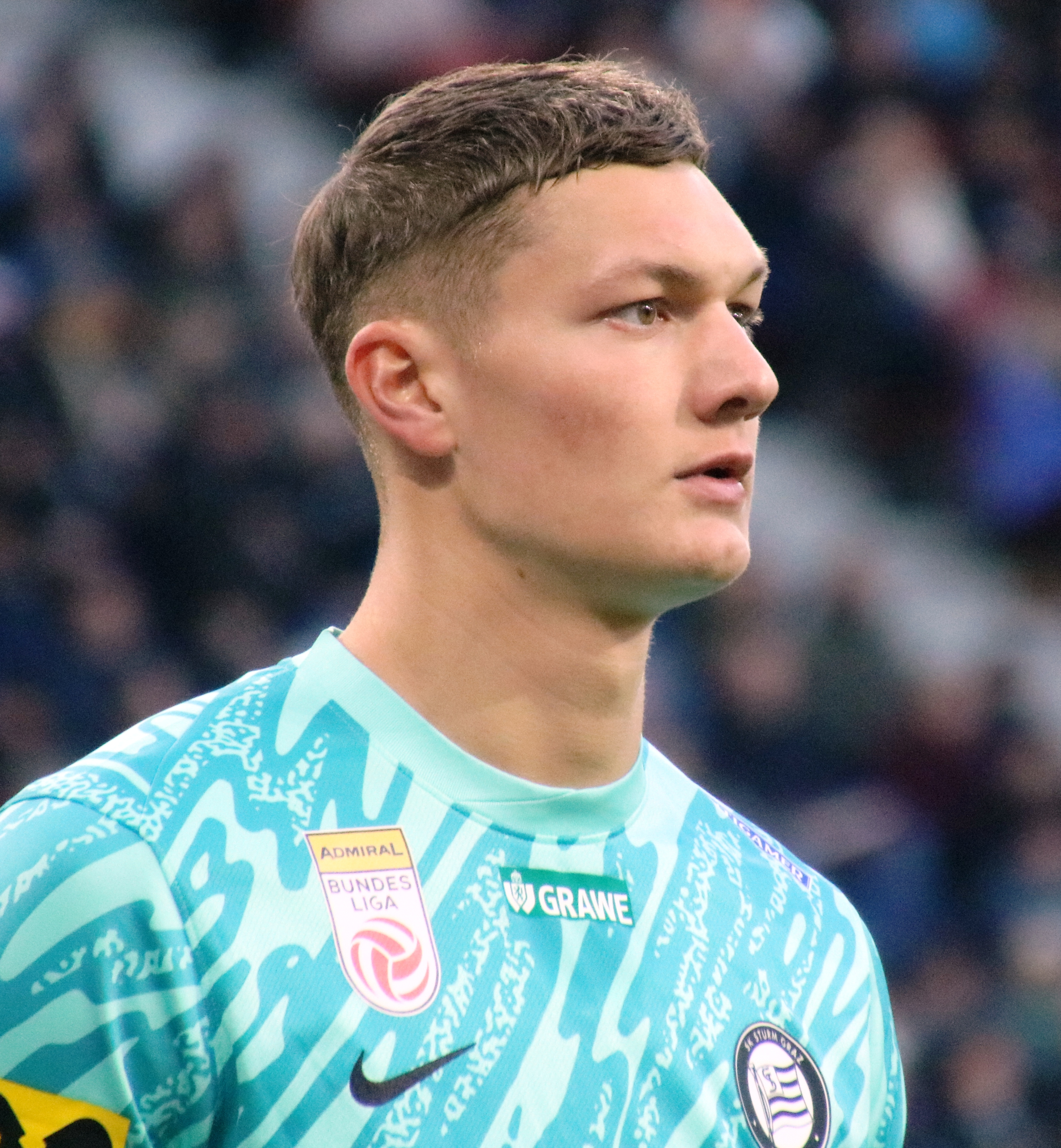
- Scherpen with Sturm Graz in 2025

Personal information
- Full name: Kjell Scherpen
- Date of birth: 23 January 2000 (age 26)
- Place of birth: Emmen, Netherlands
- Height: 2.06 m (6 ft 9 in)
- Position: Goalkeeper

Team information
- Current team: Ipswich Town
- Number: 37

Youth career
- 2007–2011: VV Emmen
- 2011–2016: Emmen

Senior career*
Years	Team	Apps	(Gls)
2016–2019	Emmen	35	(0)
2019–2021	Jong Ajax	29	(0)
2019–2021	Ajax	2	(0)
2021–2025	Brighton & Hove Albion	0	(0)
2022	→ Oostende (loan)	7	(0)
2022–2023	→ Vitesse (loan)	26	(0)
2023–2024	→ Sturm Graz (loan)	16	(0)
2024–2025	→ Sturm Graz (loan)	30	(0)
2025–2026	Union SG	32	(0)
2026–	Ipswich Town	4	(0)

International career
2018	Netherlands U19	7	(0)
2019–2023	Netherlands U21	18	(0)
- * Club domestic league appearances and goals as of 08:12, 13 September 2026 (UTC)

Kjell Scherpen (born 23 January 2000) is a Dutch professional footballer who plays as a goalkeeper for Premier League club Ipswich Town.

== Club career ==
=== Emmen ===
Scherpen began his senior career with Emmen in the 2016–17 season.

=== Ajax ===
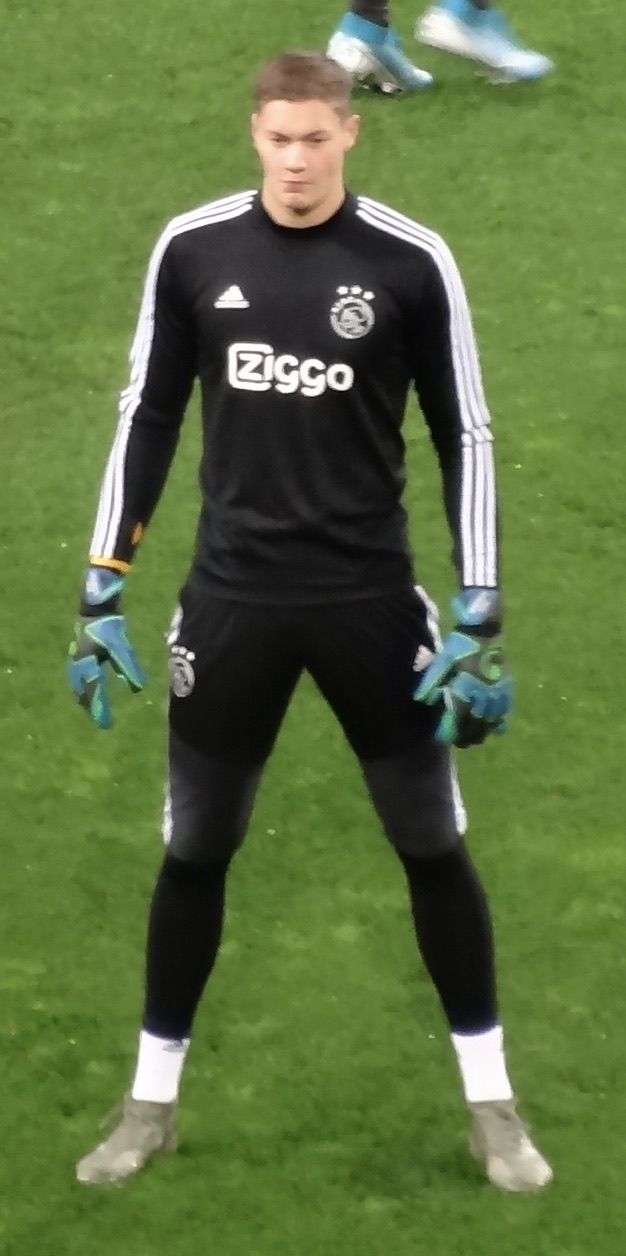
Scherpen in 2019 with Ajax.

In April 2019, it was announced that Scherpen would sign for Ajax in June 2019. His 'signing video' involved him writing the words "Ajax is de mooiste club van Nederland" (Ajax is the most beautiful club in the Netherlands) 1,000 times, as he had been a childhood supporter of rival club Feyenoord.

Scherpen made his debut for the Ajax senior team on 4 April 2021, as starter Maarten Stekelenburg was injured shortly before kickoff.

=== Brighton & Hove Albion ===
Scherpen was linked with a loan move to Eredivisie side PEC Zwolle; but, on 16 July 2021, he signed for Premier League club Brighton & Hove Albion permanently for an undisclosed fee. He made his debut on 8 January 2022, in a 2–1 (after extra-time) away victory over Championship side West Bromwich Albion in the FA Cup third round.

On 31 January 2022, Scherpen signed for Oostende of Belgian First Division A on loan for the remainder of the season. He moved on loan to Vitesse in August 2022.

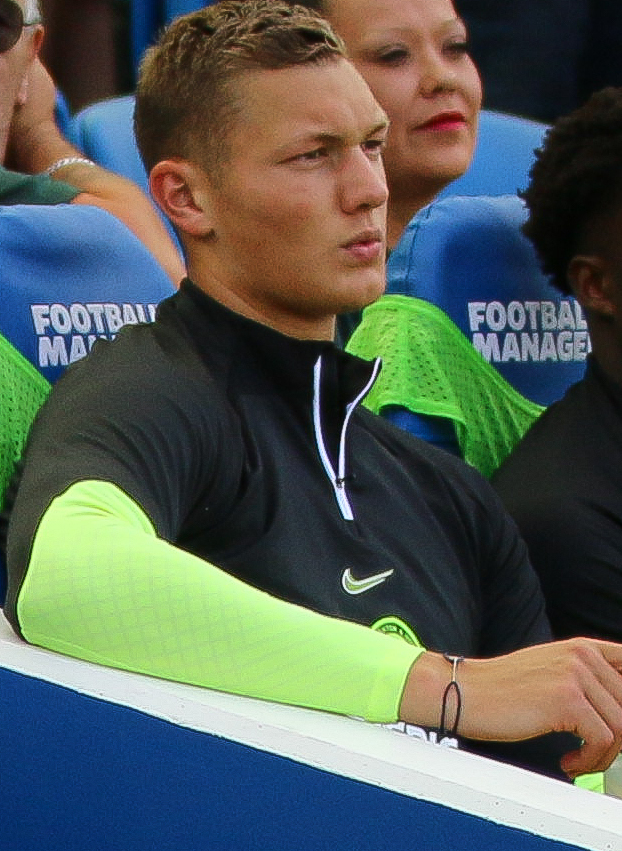
Scherpen with Brighton & Hove Albion in 2022.

On 6 July 2023, Scherpen signed a season-long loan deal with Austrian Football Bundesliga club Sturm Graz.

In December 2023, Scherpen signed a new contract with the club until 2027. He returned on loan to Sturm Graz for the 2024–25 season.

=== Union SG ===
On 24 July 2025, Scherpen signed for Belgian Pro League club Union SG for an undisclosed fee.

=== Ipswich Town ===
In July 2026, he signed for Ipswich Town, on a four-year contract.

== International career ==
Having represented the Netherlands at under-19 and under-21 youth levels, Scherpen received his first call-up to the Dutch senior squad in June 2022 to replace the injured Tim Krul.

== Personal life ==
When he was 18 years old, his older brother Jorg (20) died after having been in a coma following a sudden cardiac arrest. He is the tallest player in the history of the Premier League.

== Career statistics ==
As of match played 12 September 2026

Appearances and goals by club, season and competition
Club	Season	League			National cup (Note: Includes KNVB Cup, FA Cup, Austrian Cup)		League cup (Note: Includes EFL Cup)		Other		Total	
Club	Season	Division	Apps	Goals	Apps	Goals	Apps	Goals	Apps	Goals	Apps	Goals
Emmen	2017–18	Eerste Divisie	1	0	0	0	—		—		1	0
Emmen	2018–19	Eredivisie	34	0	1	0	—		—		35	0
Emmen	Total		35	0	1	0	—		—		36	0
Jong Ajax	2019–20	Eerste Divisie	14	0	—		—		—		14	0
Jong Ajax	2020–21	Eerste Divisie	15	0	—		—		—		15	0
Jong Ajax	Total		29	0	0	0	0	0	0	0	29	0
Ajax	2019–20	Eredivisie	0	0	0	0	—		0	0	0	0
Ajax	2020–21	Eredivisie	2	0	1	0	—		1 (Note: Appearance in UEFA Europa League)	0	4	0
Ajax	Total		2	0	1	0	0	0	1	0	4	0
Brighton & Hove Albion	2021–22	Premier League	0	0	1	0	0	0	—		1	0
Brighton & Hove Albion	2022–23	Premier League	0	0	0	0	0	0	—		0	0
Brighton & Hove Albion	2023–24	Premier League	0	0	0	0	0	0	—		0	0
Brighton & Hove Albion	2024–25	Premier League	0	0	0	0	0	0	—		0	0
Brighton & Hove Albion	Total		0	0	1	0	0	0	0	0	1	0
Oostende (loan)	2021–22	Belgian Pro League	7	0	—		—		—		7	0
Vitesse (loan)	2022–23	Eredivisie	26	0	0	0	—		—		26	0
Sturm Graz (loan)	2023–24	Austrian Bundesliga	16	0	3	0	—		8 (Note: Two appearances in UEFA Champions League, six in UEFA Europa League)	0	27	0
Sturm Graz (loan)	2024–25	Austrian Bundesliga	30	0	4	0	—		6 (Note: Appearances in UEFA Champions League)	0	40	0
Union SG	2025–26	Belgian Pro League	29	0	3	0	—		8	0	40	0
Ipswich Town	2026–27	Premier League	4	0	0	0	0	0	0	0	4	0
Career total			178	0	13	0	0	0	23	0	214	0

== Honours ==
Ajax

- Eredivisie: 2020–21
- KNVB Cup: 2020–21
- Johan Cruyff Shield: 2019

Sturm Graz

- Austrian Bundesliga: 2023–24, 2024–25
- Austrian Cup: 2023–24

Union SG

- Belgian Cup: 2025–26

Individual

- Austrian Bundesliga Goalkeeper of the Season: 2024–25
