= 2024–25 SK Sturm Graz season =

SK Sturm Graz
2024–25 season
- Manager: Christian Ilzer
- Stadium: Liebenauer Stadium
- Austrian Bundesliga: 1st (champions)
- Austrian Cup: Quarter-finals
- UEFA Champions League: League phase
- Top goalscorer: League: Otar Kiteishvili (12 goals); All: Mika Biereth (14 goals)
- Average home league attendance: 15,267
| Home colours | Away colours | Third colours |

The 2024–25 season was the 116th season in the history of SK Sturm Graz, and the club's 59th consecutive season in Austrian Football Bundesliga. In addition to the domestic league, the team to participate in the Austrian Cup and the UEFA Champions League.

Sturm Graz retained their Austrian Bundesliga title with a 1–1 draw against Wolfsberg on the final day of the season.

== Transfers ==
=== In ===
| Pos. | Player | Transferred from | Fee | Date | Source |
|---|---|---|---|---|---|
| MF | (Denmark) Tochi Chukwuani | (Denmark) Lyngby | Undisclosed | 1 July 2024 | |
| MF | (Mali) Youba Koïta | (Mali) ATS Koro | | 1 July 2024 | |
| MF | (Hungary) Martin Kern | (Hungary) Puskás AFC II | | 1 July 2024 | |
| DF | (Bosnia and Herzegovina) Emir Karić | (Germany) SV Darmstadt 98 | Free | 1 July 2024 | |
| DF | (Bosnia and Herzegovina) Arjan Malić | (Austria) SV Ried | €500,000 | 1 July 2024 | |
| GK | (Netherlands) Kjell Scherpen | (England) Brighton & Hove Albion | Loan | 2 July 2024 | |
| MF | (Croatia) Lovro Zvonarek | (Germany) Bayern Munich | Loan | 4 July 2024 | |
| FW | (Denmark) Mika Biereth | (England) Arsenal FC U21 | €4,000,000 | 8 July 2024 | |
| DF | (Austria) Emanuel Aiwu | (Italy) Cremonese | Undisclosed | 10 July 2024 | |
| GK | (Russia) Daniil Khudyakov | (Russia) Lokomotiv Moscow | €340,000 | 22 July 2024 | |

=== Out ===
| Pos. | Player | Transferred to | Fee | Date | Source |
|---|---|---|---|---|---|
| DF | (Austria) David Schnegg | (United States) D.C. United | €1,850,000 | 1 July 2024 | |
| DF | (Bosnia and Herzegovina) Jusuf Gazibegović | (Germany) 1. FC Köln | €2,000,000 | 1 January 2025 | |

== Friendlies ==
=== Pre-season ===
| 28 June 2024 Friendly | SC Weiz | 1–6 | Sturm Graz | Strobl |
| 18:00 | | | | Stadium: Sportplatz Strobl |

| 29 June 2024 Friendly | Sturm Graz | 2–2 | Flyeralarm Admira | Dechantskirchen |
| 17:00 | Jatta 58', 74' | | Stevanovic 48'; Mujanović 54' | Stadium: Raiffeisen Stadion Wechselland Dechantskirchen |

| 6 July 2024 Friendly | Sturm Graz | 0–3 | Domžale | Tillmitsch |
| 15:00 | | Report | Malić 4' (o.g.); Šturm 45'; Štefanec 53' | Stadium: Nunner Arena Tillmitsch; Attendance: 1,500 |

| 6 July 2024 Friendly | Sturm Graz | 1–4 | Rukh Lviv | Gralla |
| 18:00 | Sarkaria 85' (pen.) | | Pidgurskyi 5' (pen.); Krasnopir 35', 63'; Karabin 77'; Slyubyk (red card) 84' | Stadium: Sportplatz Gralla |

| 13 July 2024 Friendly | Sturm Graz | 3–1 | Midtjylland | Irdning |
| 11:30 | Biereth 24'; Włodarczyk 106'; Aiwu 119' | Report | Chilufya 110' | Stadium: ATV-Riesneralm-Arena Irdning; Attendance: 1,000 |
Note: 3 x 45 minutes

| 20 July 2024 Friendly | Sturm Graz | 2–2 | Monaco | Windischgarsten |
| 18:00 | Bøving 21'; Biereth 41' (pen.) | Report | Minamino 33' (pen.); Eliot Matazo 58' | Stadium: Sportplatz Windischgarsten; Attendance: 1,500 |

| 23 July 2024 Friendly | Sturm Graz | 0–2 | Porto | Graz |
| 19:00 | | | Grujić 34'; Namaso 55' | Stadium: Liebenauer Stadium |

| 7 August 2024 Friendly | Sturm Graz | 2–2 | Paris Saint-Germain | Klagenfurt, Austria |
| 18:30 | | | | Stadium: Wörthersee Stadion |

=== Mid-season ===
| 5 September 2024 Friendly | Sturm Graz | 4–1 | Kapfenberger SV |
| 11:00 CEST (UTC+2) |

=== Winter Break ===
| 11 January 2025 Winter Break | SK Sturm Graz | v | Grasshopper Club Zurich | Marbella, Spain |
| 15:00 CST (UTC+1) |

== Competitions ==
=== Overall record ===
| Competition | First match | Last match | Starting round | Record | | | | | | | |
| Competition | First match | Last match | Starting round | Pld | W | D | L | GF | GA | GD | Win % |
|---|---|---|---|---|---|---|---|---|---|---|---|
| Austrian Football Bundesliga | 4 August 2024 | | Matchday 1 | 13 | 9 | 2 | 2 | 29 | 15 | +14 | 69.23 |
| Austrian Cup | 27 July 2024 | | First round | 3 | 3 | 0 | 0 | 9 | 4 | +5 | 100.00 |
| Total | | | | 16 | 12 | 2 | 2 | 38 | 19 | +19 | 75.00 |

Last updated: 9 November 2024
Source: Soccerway

=== Austrian Football Bundesliga ===
==== League table ====
| Pos | Team | Pld | W | D | L | GF | GA | GD | Pts | Qualification |
|---|---|---|---|---|---|---|---|---|---|---|
| 1 | Sturm Graz | 22 | 14 | 4 | 4 | 51 | 28 | +23 | 46 | Qualification for the Championship round |
| 2 | Austria Wien | 22 | 14 | 4 | 4 | 36 | 19 | +17 | 46 | Qualification for the Championship round |
| 3 | Red Bull Salzburg | 22 | 10 | 8 | 4 | 33 | 22 | +11 | 38 | Qualification for the Championship round |
| 4 | Wolfsberg | 22 | 11 | 3 | 8 | 44 | 30 | +14 | 36 | Qualification for the Championship round |
| 5 | Rapid Wien | 22 | 9 | 7 | 6 | 32 | 24 | +8 | 34 | Qualification for the Championship round |

Source: Austrian Football Bundesliga
Rules for classification: 1) Points; 2) Head-to-head record; 3) Goal difference; 4) Goals scored; 5) Matches won; 6) Away matches won; 7) Away goals scored.

| Pos | Team | Pld | W | D | L | GF | GA | GD | Pts | Qualification | STU | RBS | AWI | WAC | RWI | BWL |
|---|---|---|---|---|---|---|---|---|---|---|---|---|---|---|---|---|
| 1 | Sturm Graz (C) | 32 | 19 | 6 | 7 | 66 | 39 | +27 | 40 | Qualification for the Champions League play-off round | — | 4–2 | 0–1 | 1–1 | 2–0 | 2–0 |
| 2 | Red Bull Salzburg | 32 | 16 | 9 | 7 | 53 | 36 | +17 | 38 | Qualification for the Champions League second qualifying round | 1–2 | — | 2–0 | 1–1 | 4–2 | 2–1 |
| 3 | Austria Wien | 32 | 18 | 6 | 8 | 47 | 32 | +15 | 37 | Qualification for the Conference League second qualifying round | 2–1 | 1–3 | — | 0–0 | 1–2 | 2–2 |
| 4 | Wolfsberg | 32 | 16 | 7 | 9 | 60 | 38 | +22 | 37 | Qualification for the Europa League third qualifying round (Note: Wolfsberg qualified for the Europa League third qualifying round as the 2024–25 Austrian Cup winners.) | 1–1 | 2–1 | 1–2 | — | 5–1 | 2–0 |
| 5 | Rapid Wien (O) | 32 | 12 | 8 | 12 | 43 | 42 | +1 | 27 | Qualification for the Conference League play-offs | 3–1 | 0–2 | 2–0 | 0–1 | — | 0–0 |

Source: Austrian Football Bundesliga
Legend: Blue = home team win; Yellow = draw; Red = away team win.
Rules for classification: 1) Points; 2) Points with (possible) half points subtracted due to rounding; 3) Head-to-head points; 4) Head-to-head goal difference; 5) Head-to-head goals scored; 6) Goal difference; 7) Goals scored; 8) Matches won; 9) Away matches won; 10) Away goals scored.
(C) Champions; (O) Play-off winners
Notes:

| Pos | Team | Pld | W | D | L | GF | GA | GD | Pts | Qualification | LSK | HAR | TIR | GAK | ALT | AKL |
|---|---|---|---|---|---|---|---|---|---|---|---|---|---|---|---|---|
| 1 | LASK | 32 | 16 | 6 | 10 | 51 | 36 | +15 | 38 | Qualification for the Conference League play-offs | — | 0–0 | 2–0 | 1–0 | 0–0 | 6–0 |
| 2 | TSV Hartberg | 32 | 11 | 11 | 10 | 40 | 40 | 0 | 31 | Qualification for the Conference League play-offs | 0–1 | — | 3–2 | 1–1 | 2–0 | 2–3 |
| 3 | WSG Tirol | 32 | 7 | 9 | 16 | 35 | 50 | −15 | 20 | | 1–3 | 1–3 | — | 1–1 | 1–0 | 5–3 |
| 4 | Grazer AK | 32 | 5 | 13 | 14 | 34 | 54 | −20 | 20 | | 1–0 | 0–3 | 0–0 | — | 1–0 | 1–1 |
| 5 | Rheindorf Altach | 32 | 5 | 11 | 16 | 29 | 46 | −17 | 18 | | 0–2 | 1–1 | 3–0 | 2–2 | — | 0–0 |
| 6 | Austria Klagenfurt (R) | 32 | 6 | 9 | 17 | 33 | 70 | −37 | 16 | Relegation to Austrian Football Second League | 1–4 | 0–1 | 1–4 | 0–0 | 2–3 | — |

Source: Austrian Football Bundesliga
Legend: Blue = home team win; Yellow = draw; Red = away team win.
Rules for classification: 1) Points; 2) Points with (possible) half points subtracted due to rounding; 3) Head-to-head points; 4) Head-to-head goal difference; 5) Head-to-head goals scored; 6) Goal difference; 7) Goals scored; 8) Matches won; 9) Away matches won; 10) Away goals scored.
(R) Relegated

==== Results summary ====
| Overall | | | | | | | | Home | | | | | | Away | | | | | |
| Pld | W | D | L | GF | GA | GD | Pts | W | D | L | GF | GA | GD | W | D | L | GF | GA | GD |
|---|---|---|---|---|---|---|---|---|---|---|---|---|---|---|---|---|---|---|---|
| 21 | 13 | 4 | 4 | 47 | 26 | +21 | 43 | 7 | 2 | 1 | 30 | 12 | +18 | 6 | 2 | 3 | 17 | 14 | +3 |

Last updated: 9 March 2025.
Source: ADMIRAL Bundesliga

==== Results by round ====
| Round | 1 | 2 | 3 | 4 | 5 | 7 | 6 | 8 | 9 | 10 | 11 | 12 | 13 | 14 | 15 | 16 | 17 | 18 | 19 | 20 | 21 | 22 |
|---|---|---|---|---|---|---|---|---|---|---|---|---|---|---|---|---|---|---|---|---|---|---|
| Ground | A | H | A | H | H | H | A | A | H | H | A | H | A | H | A | A | H | A | H | A | A | H |
| Result | L | W | W | W | W | L | D | W | W | W | W | D | W | W | D | W | D | L | W | L | W | |
| Position | 10 | 7 | 3 | 2 | 1 | 4 | 4 | 1 | 1 | 1 | 1 | 1 | 1 | 1 | 1 | 1 | 1 | 1 | 1 | 1 | 1 | |
| Points | 0 | 3 | 6 | 9 | 12 | 12 | 13 | 16 | 19 | 22 | 25 | 26 | 29 | 32 | 33 | 36 | 37 | 37 | 40 | 40 | 43 | |

Updated to match(es) played on 9 March 2025. Source: ADMIRAL Bundesliga
A = Away; H = Home; W = Win; D = Draw; L = Loss; P = Postponed

==== Matches ====
| 4 August 2024 1 | Rapid Wien | 1–0 | Sturm Graz | Vienna |
| 17:00 | Drena Beljo 29' | | | Stadium: Allianz Stadion |

| 11 August 2024 2 | Sturm Graz | 2–0 | Hartberg | Graz |
| 17:00 | | | | Stadium: Liebenauer Stadium |

| 17 August 2024 3 | Austria Klagenfurt | 0–2 | WSG Tirol | Klagenfurt am Wörthersee |
| | | | | Stadium: Wörthersee Stadion |

| 24 August 2024 4 | Sturm Graz | 2–1 | Rheindorf Altach | Graz |
| 17:00 | | | | Stadium: Liebenauer Stadium |

| 31 August 2024 5 | Sturm Graz | 4–2 | WSG Tirol | Graz |
| | | | | Stadium: Liebenauer Stadium |

| 22 September 2024 7 | Sturm Graz | 0–3 | Wolfsberg | Graz |
| | | | | Stadium: Liebenauer Stadium |

| 25 September 2024 6 | Austria Wien | 2–2 | Sturm Graz | Wien |
| | | | | Stadium: Franz Horr Stadium |

| 28 September 2024 8 | Blau-Weiß Linz | 1–2 | Sturm Graz | Linz |
| | | | | Stadium: Donauparkstadion |

| 6 October 2024 9 | Sturm Graz | 5–0 | Red Bull Salzburg | Graz |
| | | | | Stadium: Liebenauer Stadium |

| 19 October 2024 10 | Sturm Graz | 5–2 | Grazer AK | Graz |
| | | | | Stadium: Liebenauer Stadium |

| 2 November 2024 12 | Sturm Graz | 1–1 | Rapid Wien | Graz |
| | | | | Stadium: Liebenauer Stadium |

| 9 November 2024 13 | Hartberg | 1–2 | Sturm Graz | Hartberg |
| 17:00 CET | Fabian Wilfinger (yellow card) 44'; Markuš (yellow card) 70'; Demir (yellow card) 72'; Avdijaj (yellow card) 85'; Marco Hoffmann 90+2' | Report | Chukwuani 10' (yellow card) 47'; Lavalée (yellow card) 37'; Yardımcı 57' (yellow card) 59'; Jatta (yellow card) 68' | Stadium: Profertil Arena Hartberg; Attendance: 4,919; Referee: (Austria) Harald Lechner |

| 23 November 2024 14 | Sturm Graz | 7–0 | Austria Klagenfurt | Graz |
| 17:00 CET | Bøving 8' 55'; Lavalée (yellow card) 23'; Jatta 32'; Gazibegović (yellow card) 35'; Biereth 38' 65'; Geyrhofer 40'; Aiwu (yellow card) 79'; Grgic 90+1' | Report | Toshevski (yellow card) 80'; Bonnah (yellow card) 82' | Stadium: Liebenauer Stadium; Attendance: 15,508; Referee: (Austria) Josef Spurny |

| 30 November 2024 15 | Rheindorf Altach | 1–1 | Sturm Graz | Altach |
| 17:00 CET | Ingolitsch (yellow card) 20'; Kameri (yellow card) 62'; Gugganig 88' | Report | Biereth 45+1'; Aiwu (yellow card) 90+4' | Stadium: CASHPOINT Arena; Attendance: 4,366; Referee: (Austria) Walter Altmann |

| 7 December 2024 16 | WSG Tirol | 0–3 | Sturm Graz | Innsbruck |
| 17:00 CET | Üstündag (yellow card) 34' (yellow-red card) 72'; Sulzbacher (yellow card) 51'; Skrbo (yellow card) 68' | Report | Bøving 15'; Chukwuani (yellow card) 40' (yellow-red card) 41'; Gorenc Stanković (yellow card) 73'; Khudyakov (yellow card) 79'; Jatta 80'; Yalcouyé 85' | Stadium: Tivoli Stadion Tirol; Attendance: 2,250; Referee: (Austria) Sebastian Gishamer |

| 7 February 2025 17 | Sturm Graz | 2–2 | Austria Wien | Graz |
| 20:30 CET | Jatta 29'; Bøving 60'; Geyrhofer (yellow card) 73' | Report | Prelec 37'; Vinlöf (yellow card) 47'; Fitz 74' (pen.); Potzmann (yellow card) 90+3' | Stadium: Merkur-Arena; Attendance: 15,177; Referee: (Austria) Sebastian Gishamer |

| 15 February 2025 18 | Wolfsberger AC | 3–0 | Sturm Graz | Wolfsberg |
| 17:00 CET | Zukić 17' 23'; Omić (yellow card) 58'; Gattermayer (yellow card) 74'; Jašić (yellow card) 81'; Schöpf 83' | Report | Kiteishvili (yellow card) 49'; Malić (yellow card) 90+2' | Stadium: Lavanttal-Arena; Attendance: 5,054; Referee: (Austria) Arnes Talic |

| 23 February 2025 19 | Sturm Graz | 2–1 | Blau-Weiß Linz | Graz |
| 14:30 CET | Kiteishvili 18' (pen.); Yalcouyé 43'; Karić (yellow card) 53' | Report | Alem Pasic 83'; Tursch (yellow card) 90+3' | Stadium: Merkur-Arena; Attendance: 15,010; Referee: (Austria) Alain Sadikovski |

| 2 March 2025 20 | RB Salzburg | 3–1 | Sturm Graz | Salzburg |
| 17:00 CET | Vertessen 72'; Nene 84'; Onisiwo 87' | Report | Gorenc Stanković 10'; Lavalée (yellow card) 39'; Aiwu (yellow card) 45'; Kiteishvili (yellow card) 53' | Stadium: Red Bull Arena; Attendance: 11,400; Referee: (Austria) Walter Altmann |

| 9 March 2025 21 | Grazer AK | 1–2 | Sturm Graz | Graz |
| 17:00 CET | Thorsten Schriebl (yellow card) 9'; Christian Lichtenberger (yellow card) 33'; Maderner (yellow card) 45'; Tikvić (yellow card) 66'; Perchtold 78' (yellow card) 79' (yellow-red card) 88' | Report | Chukwuani (yellow card) 81'; Kiteishvili 86'; Yalcouyé 90+2' (yellow card) 90+3' | Stadium: Merkur-Arena; Attendance: 14,500; Referee: (Austria) Harald Lechner |

| 16 March 2025 22 | Sturm Graz | – | LASK | Graz |
| 17:00 CET | | | | Stadium: Merkur-Arena |

=== Austrian Cup ===
| 27 July 2024 First round | Kremser SC | 2–4 (a.e.t.) | Sturm Graz | Krems an der Donau |
| 18:15 | Gökçek 13', 30' (pen.) | Report | Sarkaria 6'; Horvat 26'; Gorenc Stanković 113'; Biereth 120+2' | Stadium: Sepp-Doll-Stadion; Attendance: 6,200; Referee: Alain Sadikovski |

| 27 August 2024 Second round | Ried | 1–3 | Sturm Graz | Ried im Innkreis |
| 18:00 | Bumberger 45+1' | | Horvat 23'; Jatta 32', 44', (red card) 60' | Stadium: Josko Arena |

| 30 October 2024 Round of 16 | Sturm Graz | 2–1 | Blau-Weiß Linz | Graz |
| 20:30 CET | Zvonarek 24' (Yardımcı); Aiwu (yellow card) 32'; Yardımcı 33' (Karić) | Report | Anderson (yellow card) 41'; Mitrović 58' (Dobras); Dobras (yellow card) 84' | Stadium: Merkur Arena; Attendance: 10,680; Referee: Christopher Jäger |

| 1 February 2025 Quarter-finals | Sturm Graz | 0–2 | Austria Wien | Graz |
| 18:15 CET | Jatta (yellow card) 29'; Yalcouyé (yellow card) 87'; Wüthrich (yellow card) 90+3'; Geyrhofer (yellow card) 90+5' | Report | Vinlöf (yellow card) 5'; Ranftl 9'; Raguž 89'; Kos (yellow card) 90+3'; Dragović (yellow card) 90+4'; Fischer (yellow card) 90+4'; Guenouche (yellow card) 90+5' | Stadium: Merkur Arena; Attendance: 15,400; Referee: (Austria) Christopher Jäger |

=== UEFA Champions League ===
==== League phase ====
The league phase draw was held on 29 August 2024. Sturm Graz will play their home matches at Wörthersee Stadion, Klagenfurt am Wörthersee, instead of their regular stadium, Liebenauer Stadium, Graz, which does not meet UEFA requirements.

| Pos | Team | Pld | W | D | L | GF | GA | GD | Pts |
|---|---|---|---|---|---|---|---|---|---|
| 28 | (Italian Football Federation) Bologna | 8 | 1 | 3 | 4 | 4 | 9 | −5 | 6 |
| 29 | (Football Association of Serbia) Red Star Belgrade | 8 | 2 | 0 | 6 | 13 | 22 | −9 | 6 |
| 30 | (Austrian Football Association) Sturm Graz | 8 | 2 | 0 | 6 | 5 | 14 | −9 | 6 |
| 31 | (Football Association of the Czech Republic) Sparta Prague | 8 | 1 | 1 | 6 | 7 | 21 | −14 | 4 |
| 32 | (German Football Association) RB Leipzig | 8 | 1 | 0 | 7 | 8 | 15 | −7 | 3 |

Source: UEFA
Rules for classification: League phase tiebreakers

| Round | 1 | 2 | 3 | 4 | 5 | 6 | 7 | 8 |
|---|---|---|---|---|---|---|---|---|
| Ground | A | H | H | A | H | A | A | H |
| Result | L | L | L | L | W | L | L | |
| Position | 22 | 31 | 32 | 33 | 29 | 29 | | |
| Points | 0 | 0 | 0 | 0 | 3 | 3 | 3 | |

Source: UEFA
A = Away; H = Home; W = Win; D = Draw; L = Loss

Win Draw Loss Fixtures

| 19 September 2024 1 | Brest (France) | 2–1 | (Austria) Sturm Graz | Guingamp, France |
| 21:00 CEST | Magnetti 23'; Sima (yellow card) 36', (goal) 56'; Camara (yellow card) 64'; Ajorque (yellow card) 85' | Report | Horvat (yellow card) 21'; Johnston (yellow card) 22'; Lavalée (yellow card) 40' (yellow-red card) 88'; Fernandes 45+1' (o.g.); Gorenc Stanković (yellow card) 59'; Gazibegović (yellow card) 83' | Stadium: Stade de Roudourou; Attendance: 14,518; Referee: Nick Walsh (Scotland) |
Note: Brest played their home match at Stade de Roudourou, Guingamp, instead of their regular stadium, Stade Francis-Le Blé, Brest, which did not meet UEFA requirements.

| 2 October 2024 2 | Sturm Graz (Austria) | 0–1 | (Belgium) Club Brugge | Klagenfurt am Wörthersee, Austria |
| 21:00 CEST | Aiwu (yellow card) 51'; Geyrhofer (yellow card) 66'; Yalcouyé (yellow card) 70'; Chukwuani (yellow card) 70'; Gazibegović (yellow card) 90+4' | Report | Tzolis 23'; Skóraś (yellow card) 73' | Stadium: Wörthersee Stadion; Attendance: 23,205; Referee: Aliyar Aghayev (Azerbaijan) |

| 22 October 2024 3 | Sturm Graz (Austria) | 0–2 | (Portugal) Sporting CP | Klagenfurt am Wörthersee, Austria |
| 21:00 CEST | Yalcouyé (yellow card) 39'; Yardımcı (yellow card) 90+4' | Report | Santos 23'; Gyökeres 53' | Stadium: Wörthersee Stadion; Attendance: 23,691; Referee: Giorgi Kruashvili (Georgia) |

| 5 November 2024 4 | Borussia Dortmund (Germany) | 1–0 | (Austria) Sturm Graz | Dortmund, Germany |
| 21:00 CET | Malen (yellow card) 75', (goal) 85' | Report | | Stadium: Westfalenstadion; Attendance: 81,365; Referee: Erik Lambrechts (Belgium) |

| 27 November 2024 5 | Sturm Graz (Austria) | 1–0 | (Spain) Girona | Klagenfurt am Wörthersee, Austria |
| 18:45 CET | Gazibegović (yellow card) 20'; Biereth 58' | Report | Gil (yellow card) 64' | Stadium: Wörthersee Stadion; Attendance: 21,502; Referee: Rohit Saggi (Norway) |

| 11 December 2024 6 | Lille (France) | 3–2 | (Austria) Sturm Graz | Lille, France |
| 18:45 CET | Sahroaui 37'; Bakker 45+2', (yellow card) 74'; Haraldsson 81' | Report | Chukwuani (yellow card) 8'; Kiteishvili 45+4'; Biereth 47' | Stadium: Stade Pierre-Mauroy; Attendance: 45,796; Referee: Georgi Kabakov (Bulgaria) |

| 21 January 2025 7 | Atalanta (Italy) | 5–0 | (Austria) Sturm Graz | Bergamo, Italy |
| 18:45 CET | Retegui 12'; Samardžić (yellow card) 36'; Pašalić 58'; De Ketelaere 63'; Lookman 90'; Brescianini 90+4' | Report | | Stadium: Stadio Atleti Azzurri d'Italia; Attendance: 19,469; Referee: Donatas Rumšas (Lithuania) |

| 29 January 2025 8 | Sturm Graz (Austria) | 1–0 | (Germany) RB Leipzig | Klagenfurt am Wörthersee, Austria |
| 21:00 CET | | Report | | Stadium: Wörthersee Stadion; Referee: Mykola Balakin (Ukraine) |

== Statistics ==
=== Goalscorers ===
| Rank | Pos. | Player | Austrian Bundesliga | Austrian Cup | Champions League | Total |
|---|---|---|---|---|---|---|
| 1 | FW | (Denmark) Mika Biereth | 11 | 1 | 2 | 14 |
| 2 | MF | (Georgia (country)) Otar Kiteishvili | 12 | 0 | 1 | 13 |
| 3 | MF | (Denmark) William Bøving | 11 | 0 | 0 | 11 |
| 4 | FW | (Norway) Seedy Jatta | 5 | 2 | 0 | 7 |
| 5 | MF | (Slovenia) Tomi Horvat | 4 | 2 | 0 | 6 |
| 6 | FW | (Austria) Leon Grgic | 5 | 0 | 0 | 5 |
| 7 | MF | (Mali) Malick Yalcouyé | 4 | 0 | 0 | 4 |
| 8 | MF | (Denmark) Tochi Chukwuani | 3 | 0 | 0 | 3 |
| 8 | FW | (Turkey) Erencan Yardımcı | 2 | 1 | 0 | 3 |
| 10 | MF | (Croatia) Lovro Zvonarek | 1 | 1 | 0 | 2 |
| 10 | MF | (Slovenia) Jon Gorenc Stanković | 1 | 1 | 0 | 2 |
| 12 | DF | (Austria) Emanuel Aiwu | 1 | 0 | 0 | 1 |
| 12 | DF | (Austria) Niklas Geyrhofer | 1 | 0 | 0 | 1 |
| 12 | DF | (Scotland) Max Johnston | 1 | 0 | 0 | 1 |
| 12 | DF | (Belgium) Dimitri Lavalée | 1 | 0 | 0 | 1 |
| 12 | DF | (Switzerland) Gregory Wüthrich | 1 | 0 | 0 | 1 |
| 12 | DF | (Bosnia and Herzegovina) Arjan Malić | 0 | 0 | 1 | 1 |
| 12 | FW | (Austria) Manprit Sarkaria | 0 | 1 | 0 | 1 |
| Own goals | | | 2 | 0 | 1 | 3 |
| Totals | | | 66 | 9 | 5 | 80 |

Last updated: 25 May 2025.
Source: FBref.com
