= 2023–24 FC Red Bull Salzburg season =

Red Bull Salzburg
2023–24 season
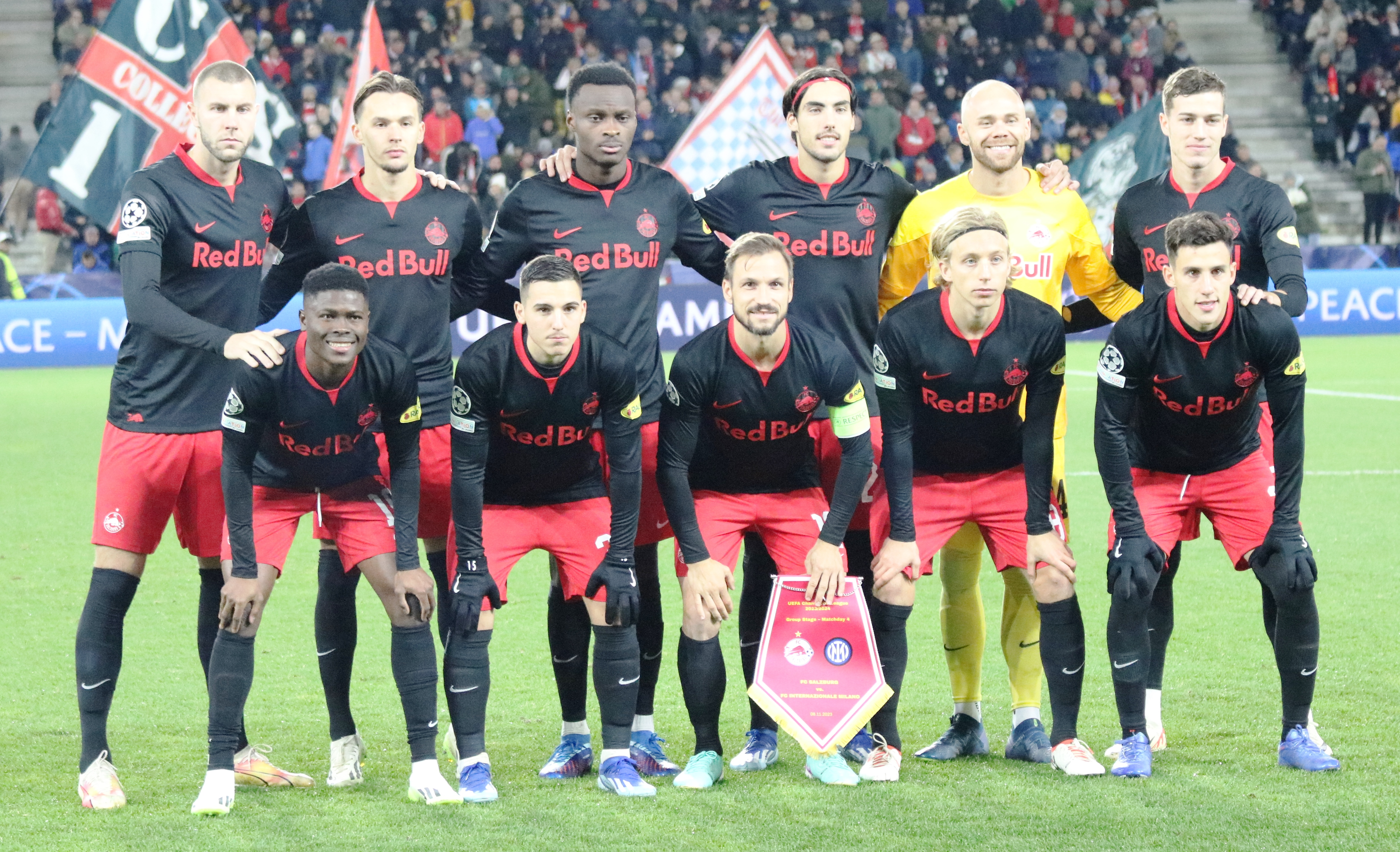
- Owner: Red Bull GmbH
- Chairman: Harald Lürzer
- Head coach: Matthias Jaissle (until 28 July); Florens Koch and Alexander Hauser (from 28 July to 31 July); Gerhard Struber (from 31 July to 15 April); Onur Çinel (from 15 April to 30 June)
- Stadium: Stadion Wals-Siezenheim
- Bundesliga: 2nd
- Austrian Cup: Semi-finals
- UEFA Champions League: Group stage
- Top goalscorer: League: Karim Konaté (20); All: Karim Konaté (22)
- Average home league attendance: 12,063
Home colours	Away colours	European colours

The 2023–24 season was the 91st season in the existence of FC Red Bull Salzburg and the club's 35th consecutive season in the top flight of Austrian football. In addition to the domestic league, Salzburg participated in this season's editions of the Austrian Cup and the UEFA Champions League.

== Players ==
=== First-team squad ===
As of 30 June 2024

Note: Flags indicate national team as defined under FIFA eligibility rules; some limited exceptions apply. Players may hold more than one non-FIFA nationality.

No.	Pos.	Nation	Player
3	DF	SRB	Aleksa Terzić
4	DF	GER	Hendry Blank
5	DF	SUI	Bryan Okoh
6	DF	AUT	Samson Baidoo
7	MF	ARG	Nicolás Capaldo
10	MF	CRO	Luka Sučić
11	FW	BRA	Fernando
13	GK	GER	Timo Horn
14	MF	DEN	Maurits Kjærgaard
15	MF	MLI	Mamady Diambou
17	DF	AUT	Andreas Ulmer (captain)
18	MF	DEN	Mads Bidstrup
19	FW	CIV	Karim Konaté
20	MF	MLI	Sekou Koita

No.	Pos.	Nation	Player
21	FW	SRB	Petar Ratkov
22	DF	FRA	Oumar Solet
23	FW	CRO	Roko Šimić
24	GK	AUT	Alexander Schlager
25	DF	AUT	Flavius Daniliuc (on loan from Salernitana)
27	MF	FRA	Lucas Gourna-Douath
28	FW	DEN	Adam Daghim
29	DF	MLI	Daouda Guindo
30	MF	ISR	Oscar Gloukh
31	DF	SRB	Strahinja Pavlović
32	MF	GHA	Forson Amankwah
36	MF	AUT	Justin Omoregie
39	DF	GER	Leandro Morgalla
41	GK	GER	Jonas Krumrey
45	FW	MLI	Dorgeles Nene
49	MF	MLI	Moussa Kounfolo Yeo
55	DF	AUT	Lukas Wallner
70	DF	BIH	Amar Dedić

== Transfers ==
In:

No.	Pos.	Nation	Player
3	DF	SRB	Aleksa Terzić (from (Italy) Fiorentina)
18	MF	DEN	Mads Bidstrup (from (England) Brentford)
21	FW	SRB	Petar Ratkov (from (Serbia) FK TSC)
24	GK	AUT	Alexander Schlager (from (Austria) LASK)
39	DF	GER	Leandro Morgalla (from (Germany) TSV 1860 Munich)
—	MF	MLI	Mamady Diambou (previously on loan at (Switzerland) Luzern)
—	FW	MLI	Dorgeles Nene (previously on loan at (Belgium) Westerlo)
—	DF	POL	Kamil Piątkowski (previously on loan at (Belgium) Gent)
—	FW	CRO	Roko Šimić (previously on loan at (Switzerland) Zürich)
—	GK	GER	Timo Horn (Free Agent)
—	DF	AUT	Flavius Daniliuc (from Salernitana on loan)
—	DF	GER	Hendry Blank (from Borussia Dortmund II)
—	FW	DEN	Adam Daghim (from FC Liefering)

Out:

No.	Pos.	Nation	Player
1	DF	GER	Nico Mantl (on loan to (Denmark) Viborg FF)
2	DF	BEL	Ignace Van der Brempt (on loan to (Germany) Hamburger SV)
4	DF	POL	Kamil Piątkowski (on loan to (Spain) Granada CF)
8	MF	AUT	Dijon Kameri (on loan to (Switzerland) Grasshopper Club Zürich)
9	FW	AUT	Junior Adamu (to (Germany) Freiburg)
13	MF	AUT	Nicolas Seiwald (to (Germany) RB Leipzig)
18	GK	SUI	Philipp Köhn (to Monaco)
30	FW	SLO	Benjamin Šeško (to (Germany) RB Leipzig)
33	GK	GER	Alexander Walke (retired)
40	GK	CZE	Adam Stejskal (to (Austria) WSG Tirol)
44	MF	NGR	Samson Tijani (on loan to (Austria) Wolfsberger AC)
49	DF	AUT	Lukas Ibertsberger (on loan to (Austria) Wolfsberger AC)
77	FW	SUI	Noah Okafor (to (Italy) Milan)
95	DF	BRA	Bernardo (to (Germany) VfL Bochum)
—	DF	AUT	Raphael Hofer (on loan to (Austria) Blau-Weiß Linz)

== Pre-season and friendlies ==
=== Matches ===
30 June 2023 Friendly	Red Bull Salzburg	2–0	Ferencváros	St. Johann im Pongau
18:00 CEST (UTC+2)	Esiti 5' (o.g.); Ratkov 8'	Report	Zachariassen 38'	Stadium: Sportplatz St. Johann

4 July 2023 Friendly	Red Bull Salzburg	0–2	Legia Warsaw	Saalfelden
18:00 CEST (UTC+2)		Report	Augustyniak 66'; Nawrocki 73'	Stadium: Saalfelden Arena

8 July 2023 Friendly	Red Bull Salzburg	0–2	Nordsjælland	Anif
15:30 CEST (UTC+2)		Report	Nygren 39'; Hansen 56'	Stadium: Sportzentrum Anif

15 July 2023 Friendly	Red Bull Salzburg	4–1	Hamburger SV	Anif
10:30 CEST (UTC+2)	Konaté 8'; Hadžikadunić 13' (o.g.); Amankwah 23'; Nene 55'	Report	Pherai 29'; Zumberi (yellow card) 90+1'	Stadium: Sportzentrum Anif

15 July 2023 Friendly	Red Bull Salzburg	0–3	Slovácko	Eugendorf
15:00 CEST (UTC+2)	Baran (yellow card) 49'	Report	Sinyavskiy 2'; Petržela 8'; Juroška 64'	Stadium: Eugendorf Sportzentrum

10 August 2023 Friendly	Red Bull Salzburg	3–4	Inter	Salzburg
19:00 CEST (UTC+2)	Konaté 5', 6', 35'; Baidoo 46'; Šimić 69'	Report	Pavlović 9' (o.g.); de Vrij 25'; Correa 43'; Frattesi (yellow card) 76'; Sensi 90'	Stadium: Red Bull Arena; Attendance: 30,188; Referee: Sebastian Gishamer

12 October 2023 Friendly	Red Bull Salzburg	1–0	Ried	Salzburg
14:00 CEST (UTC+2)	Yeo 80'	Report	Havenaar (yellow card) 39'; Ungar 69'	Stadium: Red Bull Trainingszentrum

== Competitions ==
=== Overall record ===
Competition	First match	Last match	Starting round	Final position	Record							
Competition	First match	Last match	Starting round	Final position	Pld	W	D	L	GF	GA	GD	Win %
Bundesliga	29 July 2023	19 May 2024	Matchday 1	2nd	32	20	7	5	74	29	+45	62.50
Austrian Cup	23 July 2023	4 April 2024	First round	Semi-finals	5	3	1	1	17	7	+10	60.00
UEFA Champions League	20 September 2023	12 December 2023	Group stage	Group stage	6	1	1	4	4	8	−4	16.67
Total					43	24	9	10	95	44	+51	55.81

Source: Soccerway

=== Bundesliga ===
==== League table ====
Pos	Team	Pld	W	D	L	GF	GA	GD	Pts	Qualification
1	Red Bull Salzburg	22	15	5	2	45	12	+33	50	Qualification for the Championship round
2	Sturm Graz	22	13	7	2	37	15	+22	46	Qualification for the Championship round
3	LASK	22	9	8	5	26	18	+8	35	Qualification for the Championship round
4	Austria Klagenfurt	22	8	10	4	29	27	+2	34 (Note: Head to head points: Klagenfurt 4, TSV Hartberg 1.)	Qualification for the Championship round
5	Hartberg	22	9	7	6	33	28	+5	34	Qualification for the Championship round

Source: Austrian Football Bundesliga
Rules for classification: 1) Points; 2) Head-to-head record; 3) Goal difference; 4) Goals scored; 5) Matches won; 6) Away matches won; 7) Away goals scored.

==== Result summary ====
Overall								Home						Away					
Pld	W	D	L	GF	GA	GD	Pts	W	D	L	GF	GA	GD	W	D	L	GF	GA	GD
22	15	5	2	45	12	+33	50	8	1	2	23	5	+18	7	4	0	22	7	+15

Source: Austrian Football Bundesliga

==== Result by round ====
Round	1	2	3	4	5	6	7	8	9	10	11	12	13	14	15	16	17	18	19	20	21	22
Ground	A	H	H	A	A	H	A	H	A	A	H	H	A	A	H	H	A	H	A	H	H	A
Result	W	W	W	W	W	W	D	L	W	D	L	W	W	D	W	W	W	D	D	W	W	W
Position	3	2	1	1	1	1	1	1	1	2	2	2	1	1	1	1	1	1	1	1	1	1

Source: Austrian Football Bundesliga
A = Away; H = Home; W = Win; D = Draw; L = Loss

==== Matches ====
29 July 2023 1	SC Rheindorf Altach	0–2	Red Bull Salzburg	Altach
18:30 CEST (UTC+2)	Bähre (yellow card) 52'	Report	Ratkov 34'; Pavlović 48', (yellow card) 90+1'	Stadium: Cashpoint Arena; Attendance: 5,874; Referee: Walter Altmann

6 August 2023 2	Red Bull Salzburg	3–0	WSG Tirol	Salzburg
16:00 CEST (UTC+2)	Konaté 57', 87'; Nene 90+4'	Report	Ertlthaler (yellow card) 35'; K. Schulz (yellow card) 36'; Stumberger (yellow card) 42'; Jaunegg (yellow card) 85'	Stadium: Wals–Siezenheim; Attendance: 11,737; Referee: Josef Spurny

13 August 2023 3	Red Bull Salzburg	2–0	Austria Wien	Salzburg
16:00 CEST (UTC+2)	Forson 55'; Gloukh (yellow card) 89'; Konaté (yellow card) 90+2', (goal) 90+9'	Report	Handl (yellow card) 21'; Gruber (yellow card) 83'; Baltaxa (yellow card) 90+7'	Stadium: Wals–Siezenheim; Attendance: 13,837; Referee: Christian-Petru Ciochirca

20 August 2023 4	Hartberg	1–5	Red Bull Salzburg	Hartberg
16:00 CEST (UTC+2)	Sangaré (yellow card) 12'; Entrup 45+1', (yellow card) 52'; C. Lang (yellow card) 75'; Diakité (yellow card) 86'	Report	Gloukh 16'; Konaté 47'; Dedić 50', 64'; Koïta 76'	Stadium: Profertil Arena; Attendance: 3,426; Referee: Harald Lechner

26 August 2023 5	Wolfsberger AC	1–2	Red Bull Salzburg	Wolfsberg
16:00 CEST (UTC+2)	M. Bamba 43', (yellow card) 45+4'; Veratschnig (yellow card) 57'; Leitgeb (yellow card) 69'; Boakye (yellow card) 85' (yellow-red card) 90+1'; Omić (yellow card) 89'; Altunashvili (yellow card) 90+6'	Report	Pavlović (yellow card) 32'; Konaté 45+3'; Baidoo 63'; Koïta 73'; Ulmer (yellow card) 80'	Stadium: Lavanttal-Arena; Attendance: 3,870; Referee: Stefan Ebner

3 September 2023 6	Red Bull Salzburg	2–0	Rapid Wien	Salzburg
16:00 CEST (UTC+2)	Šimić 15', 35'; Pavlović (yellow card) 73'	Report	Bajic (yellow card) 73'; Sollbauer (yellow card) 88'; Moormann (yellow card) 90+4'	Stadium: Wals–Siezenheim; Attendance: 17,089; Referee: Alexander Harkam

16 September 2023 7	Sturm Graz	2–2	Red Bull Salzburg	Graz
18.30 CEST (UTC+2)	Gazibegovic (yellow card) 16'; Kiteishvili 53'; Sarkaria 63'; J. G. Stanković (yellow card) 71'; Wüthrich (yellow card) 77'; Schnegg (yellow card) 77'; Hierländer (yellow card) 85'; Prass (yellow card) 90'	Report	Baidoo 40'; Konaté (yellow card) 45+8'; Koïta 73' (pen.); Dedić (yellow card) 77'; Gourna-Douath (yellow card) 77'	Stadium: Merkur–Arena; Attendance: 15,500; Referee: Julian Weinberger

23 September 2023 8	Red Bull Salzburg	0–1	Blau-Weiß Linz	Salzburg
16.00 CEST (UTC+2)	Koïta (yellow card) 63'	Report	Koch (yellow card) 41'; Ronivaldo 61'; P. Mensah (yellow card) 83'	Stadium: Wals–Siezenheim; Attendance: 11,535; Referee: Walter Altmann

30 September 2023 9	Austria Lustenau	0–4	Red Bull Salzburg	Lustenau
16.00 CEST (UTC+2)	Schierl (yellow card) 27'; Moltenis 68'; Gmeiner 82'	Report	Šimić 21'; Solet 25'; Konaté 39'; Gloukh 58'	Stadium: Planet Pure Stadion; Attendance: 4,112; Referee: Markus Hameter

8 October 2023 10	Austria Klagenfurt	2–2	Red Bull Salzburg	Klagenfurt
16.00 CEST (UTC+2)	Wimmer 45+1'; Jaritz 74'; Straudi (yellow card) 87'	Report	Šimić 7'; Forson 29'; Pavlović (red card) 38'; Gourna-Douath (yellow card) 46'; Schlager (yellow card) 70'	Stadium: Wörthersee Stadion; Attendance: 4,892; Referee: Christian Petru-Ciochirca

21 October 2023 11	Red Bull Salzburg	0–1	LASK	Salzburg
16.00 CEST (UTC+2)		Report	Žulj 34'; Michorl (yellow card) 82'	Stadium: Wals–Siezenheim; Attendance: 15,625; Referee: Alexander Harkam

28 October 2023 12	Red Bull Salzburg	3–0	Rheindorf Altach	Salzburg
16.00 CEST (UTC+2)	Dedić 44'; Kjærgaard 46'; Konaté 59'; Guindo (yellow card) 84'; Bidstrup (yellow card) 90'	Report	Jäger (yellow card) 34'; Strauß (yellow card) 50'	Stadium: Wals–Siezenheim; Attendance: 10,177; Referee: Harald Lechner

4 November 2023 13	WSG Tirol	0–2	Red Bull Salzburg	Wattens
16.00 CEST (UTC+2)	Sulzbacher (yellow card) 85' (yellow-red card) 90+1'; Bacher (yellow card) 90+4'	Report	Konaté 27', (yellow card) 48', (goal) 90+5'; Solet (yellow card) 45+7'; Gourna-Douath (yellow card) 55'	Stadium: Tivoli Stadion Tirol; Attendance: 2,850; Referee: Julian Weinberger

12 November 2023 14	Austria Wien	0–0	Red Bull Salzburg	Vienna
16:00 CEST (UTC+2)	Jukić (yellow card) 20'; Schmidt (yellow card) 78'; Martins (red card) 88'; Baltaxa (yellow card) 90+3'	Report	Guindo (yellow card) 33'; Forson (yellow card) 35'; Pavlović (yellow card) 83'; Schlager (yellow card) 84'; Capaldo (yellow card) 88'	Stadium: Franz Horr Stadium; Attendance: 13,153; Referee: Stefan Ebner

25 November 2023 15	Red Bull Salzburg	3–2	Hartberg	Salzburg
16:00 CEST (UTC+2)	Bidstrup (yellow card) 14'; Ratkov 45+4'; Dedić (yellow card) 45+6'; Gloukh 48'; Nene 85'; Pavlović (yellow card) 90+3'	Report	Bowat 11'; Morgalla 56' (o.g.); Entrup (yellow card) 64'; Sangaré (yellow card) 90+2'	Stadium: Wals–Siezenheim; Attendance: 7,453; Referee: Achim Untergasser

3 December 2023 16	Red Bull Salzburg	1–0	Wolfsberger AC	Salzburg
13:30 CEST (UTC+2)	Gloukh 45'; Piątkowski (yellow card) 90+6'	Report	Scherzer (yellow card) 26'; Kennedy (yellow card) 87'; Zimmermann (yellow card) 90+7'	Stadium: Wals–Siezenheim; Attendance: 3,921; Referee: Daniel Pfister

9 December 2023 17	Rapid Wien	0–1	Red Bull Salzburg	Vienna
13:30 CEST (UTC+2)	Sattlberger (yellow card) 45+1'; Grgić (yellow card) 90+10'	Report	Piątkowski 19'; Baidoo (yellow card) 34'; Capaldo (yellow card) 46'; Schlager (yellow card) 90+7'; Koïta (yellow card) 90+9'	Stadium: Allianz Stadion; Attendance: 20,400; Referee: Walter Altmann

9 February 2024 18	Red Bull Salzburg	1–1	Sturm Graz	Salzburg
20:30 CET (UTC+1)	Ratkov 15'; Diambou (yellow card) 33'; Fernando (yellow card) 47'	Report	Kiteishvili 80'; Schnegg (yellow card) 90+1'	Stadium: Wals–Siezenheim; Attendance: 15,329; Referee: Harald Lechner

17 February 2024 19	Blau-Weiß Linz	1–1	Red Bull Salzburg	Linz
17:00 CET (UTC+1)	Maranda 12'; Strauss (yellow card) 30'; Dobras (red card) 90+5'	Report	Ratkov 1'	Stadium: Hoffmann Personal Stadion; Attendance: 5,500; Referee: Alan Kijas

24 February 2024 20	Red Bull Salzburg	7–0	Austria Lustenau	Salzburg
17:00 CET (UTC+1)	Fernando 4', 32'; Lins 13' (o.g.); Kjaergaard 18'; Gloukh 54'; Konaté 72'; Maak 88' (o.g.)	Report	Boateng (yellow card) 29'	Stadium: Wals–Siezenheim; Attendance: 8,891; Referee: Safak Barmaksiz

2 March 2024 21	Red Bull Salzburg	1–0	Austria Klagenfurt	Salzburg
17:00 CET (UTC+1)	Fernando (yellow card) 68'; Konaté 73'; Dedić (yellow card) 88'; Konaté (yellow card) 90+3'	Report	Gezos (yellow card) 61'; Maglica (yellow card) 62'	Stadium: Wals–Siezenheim; Attendance: 10,521; Referee: Alexander Harkam

9 March 2024 22	LASK	0–1	Red Bull Salzburg	Linz
17:00 CET (UTC+1)	Jovicic (yellow card) 87'	Report	Fernando 1'	Stadium: Raiffeisen Arena; Attendance: 14,800; Referee: Christian-Petru Ciochirca

==== League table ====
Pos	Team	Pld	W	D	L	GF	GA	GD	Pts	Qualification
1	Sturm Graz (C)	32	19	10	3	56	23	+33	44	Qualification for the Champions League league stage
2	Red Bull Salzburg	32	20	7	5	74	29	+45	42	Qualification for the Champions League third qualifying round (Note: Since the Europa League winners, Atalanta qualified for the Champions League via league position, Red Bull Salzburg were promoted from the Champions League second qualifying round to the third qualifying round as one of the two teams with the highest coefficient in the second qualifying round.)
3	LASK	32	14	10	8	43	33	+10	34	Qualification for the Europa League play-off round (Note: The 2023–24 Austrian Cup winners qualified for the Europa League play-off round. Since the cup winners (Sturm Graz) qualified based on league position, the Europa League spot was passed to the third-placed team.)
4	Rapid Wien	32	11	12	9	47	35	+12	28	Qualification for the Europa League second qualifying round
5	Hartberg	32	12	9	11	49	52	−3	28	Qualification for the Conference League play-offs

Source: Austrian Football Bundesliga
Rules for classification: 1) Points; 2) Points with (possible) half points subtracted due to rounding; 3) Head-to-head points; 4) Head-to-head goal difference; 5) Head-to-head goals scored; 6) Goal difference; 7) Goals scored; 8) Matches won; 9) Away matches won; 10) Away goals scored.
(C) Champions

==== Results summary ====
Overall								Home						Away					
Pld	W	D	L	GF	GA	GD	Pts	W	D	L	GF	GA	GD	W	D	L	GF	GA	GD
32	20	7	5	74	29	+45	67	11	3	2	42	12	+30	9	4	3	32	17	+15

Source: Austrian Football Bundesliga

==== Results by round ====
Round	1	2	3	4	5	6	7	8	9	10
Ground	H	A	H	A	A	H	A	H	A	H
Result	W	W	D	L	W	L	D	L	W	W
Position	1	1	1	1	1	2	2	2	2	2

Source: Austrian Football Bundesliga
A = Away; H = Home; W = Win; D = Draw; L = Loss

==== Matches ====
17 March 2024 23	Red Bull Salzburg	5–1	Hartberg	Salzburg
17:00 CET (UTC+1)	Pavlović (yellow card) 20'; Ratkov 28'; Bidstrup 45'; Fernando 51'; Gloukh 84'; Koïta 90+3'	Report	Bowat (red card) 20'; Heil 75'; Halwachs (yellow card) 90'; Pfeier (yellow card) 90+2'	Stadium: Red Bull Arena; Attendance: 8,134; Referee: Harald Lechner

31 March 2024 24	Sturm Graz	0–1	Red Bull Salzburg	Graz
16:00 CET (UTC+2)	Gazibegović (yellow card) 44'; Wüthrich (yellow card) 78'; Stanković (red card) 90+5'; Lavalée (red card) 90+11'	Report	Gloukh (yellow card) 31'; Bidstrup 48'; Ratkov (yellow card) 89'; Schlager (yellow card) 90+5'; Gourna-Douath (yellow card) 90+5' (yellow-red card) 90+5'; Konaté (yellow card) 90+12'	Stadium: Merkur Arena; Attendance: 15,372; Referee: Stefan Ebner

7 April 2024 25	Red Bull Salzburg	1–1	Rapid Wien	Salzburg
17:00 CEST (UTC+2)	Konaté 87'; Pavlović (yellow card) 90+11'	Report	Sattlberger (yellow card) 85'; Grüll 90+6'; Kasanwirjo (yellow card) 90+10'	Stadium: Red Bull Arena; Attendance: 15,064; Referee: Alan Kijas

12 April 2024 26	LASK	3–1	Red Bull Salzburg	Linz
19:30 CEST (UTC+2)	Ljubičić 18', 26', 73'; Andrade (yellow card) 70'; Jovičić (yellow card) 76'; Stojković (yellow card) 79'; Lawal (yellow card) 90+2'	Report	Gourna-Douath (yellow card) 9'; Nene 84'	Stadium: Raiffeisen Arena; Attendance: 13,800; Referee: Alexander Harkam

21 April 2024 27	Red Bull Salzburg	4–2	Klagenfurt	Salzburg
17:00 CEST (UTC+2)	Sučić 5'; Pavlović (yellow card) 7'; Gloukh 34'; Konaté 35', 44'; Šimić (yellow card) 40'; Diambou (yellow card) 74'	Report	Irving 31' (pen.); Besuschkow 52'; Jaritz (yellow card) 71'; Arweiler (yellow card) 85'; Mahrer (yellow card) 90+3'	Stadium: Red Bull Arena; Attendance: 9,555; Referee: Julian Weinberger

24 April 2024 28	Klagenfurt	4–3	Red Bull Salzburg	Klagenfurt
18:30 CEST (UTC+2)	Bonnah 52'; Irving 63', 74', 85'; Menzel (yellow card) 79'; Cvetko (yellow card) 90+7'	Report	Konaté 9', 18'; Pavlović 87', (yellow card) 87'	Stadium: Wörthersee Stadion; Attendance: 3,144; Referee: Stefan Ebner

28 April 2024 29	Red Bull Salzburg	2–2	Sturm Graz	Salzburg
17:00 CEST (UTC+2)	Nene 72'; Konaté 82'; Solet (yellow card) 83'	Report	Prass 1', 34'; Kiteishvili (yellow card) 60'	Stadium: Red Bull Arena; Attendance: 17,062; Referee: Harald Lechner

5 May 2024 30	Rapid Wien	2–0	Red Bull Salzburg	Vienna
17:00 CEST (UTC+2)	Leopold Querfeld (yellow card) 31'; Grüll 51' (pen.); Schick (yellow card) 59'; Burgstaller 73'; Hofmann (yellow card) 85'	Report	Gloukh (yellow card) 49'; Pavlović (yellow card) 90+6'	Stadium: Allianz Stadion; Attendance: 18,100; Referee: Christian-Petru Ciochirca

12 May 2024 31	Hartberg	1–5	Red Bull Salzburg	Hartberg
17.00 CEST (UTC+2)	Avdijaj 41'; Sangare 71'	Report	Šimić 11'; Konaté 27', 49', 79'; Koïta 45'	Stadium: Profertil Arena Hartberg; Attendance: 3,600; Referee: Alan Kijas

19 May 2024 32	Red Bull Salzburg	7–1	LASK	Salzburg
17.00 CEST (UTC+2)	Koïta 7', 71'; Sučić 8', 61' (pen.); Pavlović 36'; Daniliuc (yellow card) 45+3'; Šimić (yellow card) 49'; Konaté 71'; Nene 78'	Report	Usor 25'; Flecker (yellow card) 45+3'	Stadium: Red Bull Arena; Attendance: 17,173; Referee: Walter Altmann

=== Austrian Cup ===
23 July 2023 First round	SG Ardagger/Viehdorf	0–6	Red Bull Salzburg	Ardagger
16:00 CEST (UTC+2)		Report	Konaté 10', 35'; Dedić 45'; Kjærgaard 52'; Solet (yellow card) 61'; Kameri 65'; Kaltenbrunner 85' (o.g.)	Stadium: Sportplatz Addager; Attendance: 2,500; Referee: Ristoskov Emil

26 September 2023 Second round	Austria Salzburg	0–4	Red Bull Salzburg	Salzburg
12:45 CEST (UTC+2)	L. Sandmayr (yellow card) 39'; Schwaighofer (yellow card) 77'; Theiner (yellow card) 77'; Zia (yellow card) 87'; Hausberger (yellow card) 87'	Report	Dedić 8'; Forson 64', 72'; Pavlović 83'; Capaldo (yellow card) 87'	Stadium: Sportzentrum ASKÖ Salzburg West; Attendance: 4,101; Referee: Kijas Alan

1 November 2023 Third round	TSV Egger Glas Hartberg	1–1 (4–5 p)	Red Bull Salzburg	Hartberg
18:00 CET (UTC+1)	Sangare (yellow card) 3'; Entrup 67'; Halwachs (yellow card) 106'	Report	Sučić (yellow card) 57'; Kjærgaard (yellow card) 68'; Ratkov 77'; Dedić (yellow card) 90+3'; Capaldo (yellow card) 90+3'	Stadium: Profertil Arena Hartberg; Attendance: 2,900; Referee: Walter Altmann
	Penalties
	Frieser (penalty scored); Sallinger (penalty scored); Kainz (penalty scored); Entrup (penalty scored); Avdijaj (penalty missed)		Šimić (penalty scored); Ratkov (penalty scored); Dedić (penalty scored); Pavlović (penalty scored); Solet (penalty scored)

2 February 2024 Quarter-finals	LASK	2–3	Red Bull Salzburg	Linz
18:00 CET (UTC+1)	Ljubičić 18'; Usor (yellow card) 61'; Žulj (yellow card) 79'; Flecker (yellow card) 84'; Horvath 90+4'	Report	Fernando (yellow card) 8', (goal) 28', 51'; Gourna-Douath 16', (yellow card) 81'; Gloukh (yellow card) 84'	Stadium: Raiffeisen Arena; Attendance: 14,700; Referee: Julian Weinberger

4 April 2024 Semi-finals	Red Bull Salzburg	3–4	Sturm Graz	Salzburg
20:45 CEST (UTC+2)	Solet 11'; Ratkov (yellow card) 41'; Sučić 80'; Aleksa Terzić 90'; Koïta (yellow card) 90+3'	Report	Bøving 25'; Horvat 52'; Wüthrich (yellow card) 66'; Schnegg 71'; Geyrhofer (yellow card) 77' (goal) 81'	Stadium: Red Bull Arena; Attendance: 11,494; Referee: Walter Altmann

=== UEFA Champions League ===
The draw for the group stage was held on 31 August 2023 in Monaco. Die Roten Bullen were drawn against Benfica, Inter Milan and Real Sociedad.

Pos	Team	Pld	W	D	L	GF	GA	GD	Pts	Qualification
1	(Spain) Real Sociedad	6	3	3	0	7	2	+5	12 (Note: Tied on head-to-head points, goal difference, and goals scored. Goal difference in all matches: Real Sociedad +5, Inter Milan +3.)	Advance to knockout phase
2	(Italy) Inter Milan	6	3	3	0	8	5	+3	12	Advance to knockout phase
3	(Portugal) Benfica	6	1	1	4	7	11	−4	4 (Note: Tied on head-to-head points, goal difference, goals scored, and goal difference in all matches. Goals scored in all matches: Benfica 7, Red Bull Salzburg 4.)	Transfer to Europa League
4	(Austria) Red Bull Salzburg	6	1	1	4	4	8	−4	4	

Source: UEFA
Rules for classification: Group stage tiebreakers
Notes:

20 September 2023 1	Benfica (Portugal)	0–2	(Austria) Red Bull Salzburg	Lisbon, Portugal
20:00 WEST (UTC+0)	Trubin (yellow card) 2'; A. Silva (red card) 13'; R. Silva (yellow card) 54'; Otamendi (yellow card) 69'	Report	Šimić 15' (pen.) (yellow card) 67'; Gourna-Douath (yellow card) 21'; Gloukh 51'; Baidoo (yellow card) 58'; Koïta (yellow card) 90+1'	Stadium: Estádio da Luz; Referee: Halil Umut Meler (Turkey)

3 October 2023 2	Red Bull Salzburg (Austria)	0–2	(Spain) Real Sociedad	Salzburg, Austria
18.45 CEST (UTC+2)	Solet (yellow card) 41'; Pavlović (yellow card) 76'; Baidoo (yellow card) 88'	Report	Oyarzabal 7'; Le Normand (yellow card) 15'; Méndez 27', (yellow card) 59'	Stadium: Stadion Wals–Siezenheim; Referee: Bartosz Frankowski (Poland)

24 October 2023 3	Inter Milan (Italy)	2–1	(Austria) Red Bull Salzburg	Milan, Italy
18.45 CEST (UTC+2)	Sánchez 19'; Mkhitaryan (yellow card) 28'; Çalhanoğlu 64' (pen.)	Report	Šimić (yellow card) 23'; Gourna-Douath (yellow card) 29'; Gloukh 57'	Stadium: San Siro; Attendance: 71,825; Referee: François Letexier (France)

8 November 2023 4	Red Bull Salzburg (Austria)	0–1	(Italy) Inter Milan	Salzburg, Austria
21:00 CEST (UTC+2)	Pavlović (yellow card) 51'; Gloukh (yellow card) 75'	Report	Bisseck (yellow card) 27'; Çalhanoğlu (yellow card) 49'; Martínez 85' (pen.)	Stadium: Stadion Wals–Siezenheim; Attendance: 30,071; Referee: Serdar Gözübüyük (Netherlands)

29 November 2023 5	Real Sociedad (Spain)	0–0	(Austria) Red Bull Salzburg	San Sebastián, Spain
21:00 CEST (UTC+2)	Elustondo (yellow card) 38'	Report	Dedić (yellow card) 90+1'	Stadium: Anoeta; Attendance: 34,419; Referee: Mykola Balakin (Ukraine)

12 December 2023 6	Red Bull Salzburg (Austria)	1–3	(Portugal) Benfica	Salzburg, Austria
21:00 CEST (UTC+2)	Gourna-Douath (yellow card) 10'; Ratkov (yellow card) 51'; Sučić 57'; Kameri (yellow card) 82'; Schlager (yellow card) 90'	Report	Di María 32'; Rafa 45+1'; Morato (yellow card) 45+4'; Musa (yellow card) 72'; Cabral 90+2'	Stadium: Stadion Wals–Siezenheim; Attendance: 27,134; Referee: Daniel Siebert (Ukraine)

== Statistics ==
=== Appearances and goals ===
As of 19 May 2024

No.	Pos	Nat	Player	Total		Bundesliga		Austrian Cup		Champions League	
No.	Pos	Nat	Player	Apps	Goals	Apps	Goals	Apps	Goals	Apps	Goals
Goalkeepers
1	GK	(Germany) GER	Nico Mantl	1	0	1	0	0	0	0	0
13	GK	(Germany) GER	Timo Horn	3	0	3	0	0	0	0	0
24	GK	(Austria) AUT	Alexander Schlager	39	0	28	0	5	0	6	0
Defenders
3	DF	(Austria) AUT	Aleksa Terzić	22	1	13+5	0	1+1	1	2	0
4	DF	(Poland) POL	Kamil Piątkowski	10	1	4+3	1	0	0	2+1	0
6	DF	(Austria) AUT	Samson Baidoo	23	2	14+3	2	1	0	3+2	0
17	DF	(Austria) AUT	Andreas Ulmer	18	0	6+7	0	2	0	3	0
22	DF	(France) FRA	Oumar Solet	28	2	19+2	1	4	1	2+1	0
25	DF	(Austria) AUT	Flavius Daniliuc	12	0	10+1	0	1	0	0	0
29	DF	(Mali) MLI	Daouda Guindo	21	0	13+5	0	1+2	0	0	0
31	DF	(Serbia) SRB	Strahinja Pavlović	37	4	26	3	5	1	6	0
39	DF	(Germany) GER	Leandro Morgalla	5	0	2+1	0	0+1	0	0+1	0
55	DF	(Austria) AUT	Lukas Wallner	1	0	0	0	0+1	0	0	0
70	DF	(Bosnia and Herzegovina) BIH	Amar Dedić	31	5	18+3	3	4	2	6	0
Midfielders
7	MF	(Argentina) ARG	Nicolás Capaldo	16	0	5+5	0	1+1	0	2+2	0
8	MF	(Austria) AUT	Dijon Kameri	8	1	2+4	0	0+1	1	0+1	0
10	MF	(Croatia) CRO	Luka Sučić	32	5	17+5	3	3+1	1	4+2	1
14	MF	(Denmark) DEN	Maurits Kjærgaard	24	3	15+2	2	4	1	3	0
15	MF	(Mali) MLI	Mamady Diambou	16	0	8+6	0	2	0	0	0
18	MF	(Denmark) DEN	Mads Bidstrup	36	2	21+4	2	4+1	0	6	0
20	MF	(Mali) MLI	Sekou Koita	24	8	4+15	8	1+2	0	0+2	0
27	MF	(France) FRA	Lucas Gourna-Douath	35	1	20+8	0	2	1	4+1	0
30	MF	(Israel) ISR	Oscar Gloukh	40	9	25+4	7	4+1	0	6	2
32	MF	(Ghana) GHA	Forson Amankwah	29	4	14+9	2	1+1	2	0+4	0
49	MF	(Mali) MLI	Moussa Kounfolo Yeo	1	0	0+1	0	0	0	0	0
Forwards
11	FW	(Brazil) BRA	Fernando	14	6	8+3	4	1+1	2	0+1	0
19	FW	(Ivory Coast) CIV	Karim Konaté	38	22	22+7	20	3+1	2	3+2	0
21	FW	(Serbia) SRB	Petar Ratkov	35	6	12+12	5	3+2	1	2+4	0
23	FW	(Croatia) CRO	Roko Šimić	38	6	16+12	5	1+3	0	4+2	1
28	FW	(Denmark) DEN	Adam Daghim	1	0	0+1	0	0	0	0	0
45	FW	(Mali) MLI	Dorgeles Nene	31	5	6+18	5	1+2	0	2+2	0
