= 2022–23 FC Red Bull Salzburg season =

Red Bull Salzburg
2022–23 season
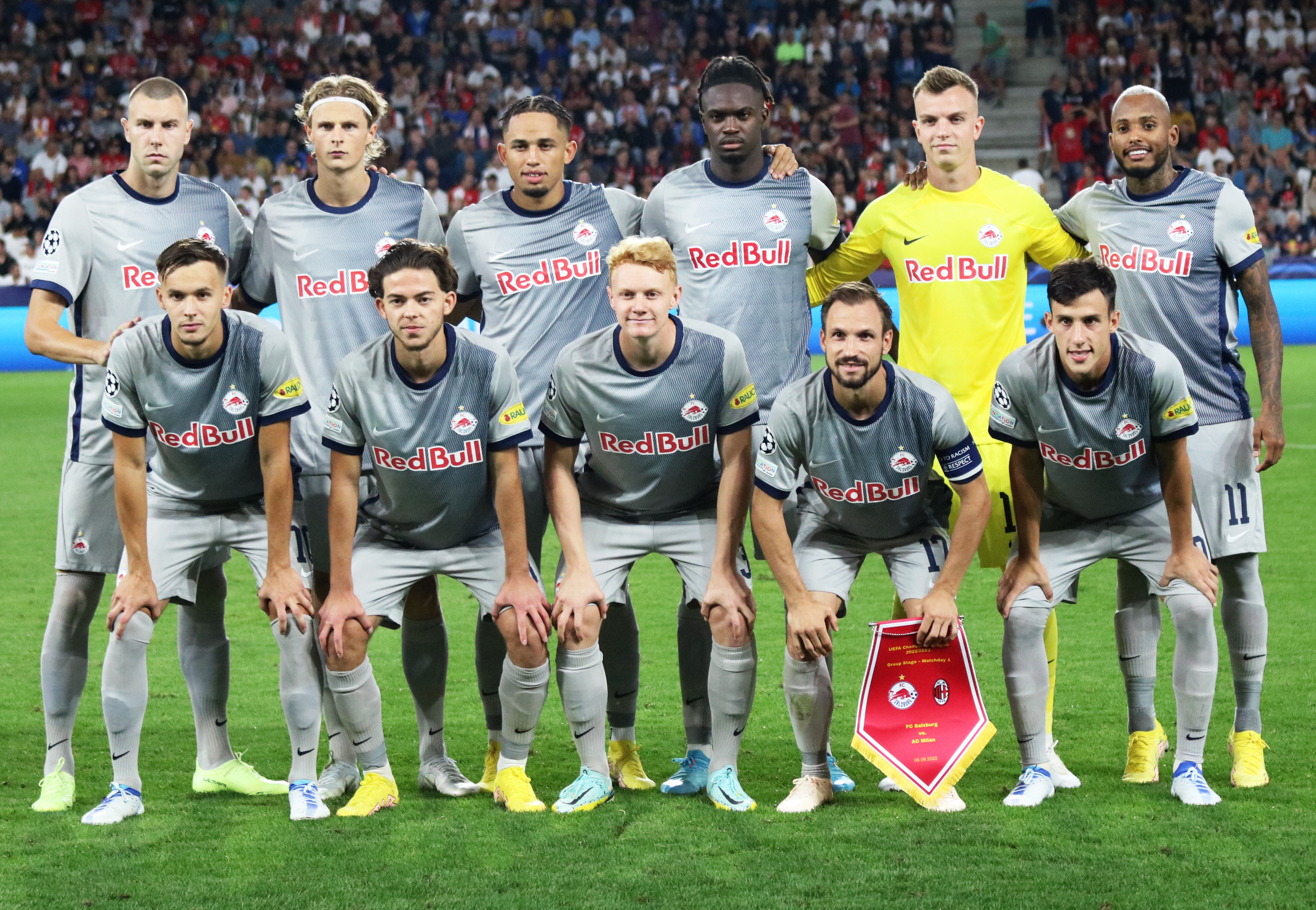
- Owner: Red Bull GmbH
- Chairman: Harald Lürzer
- Head coach: Matthias Jaissle
- Stadium: Stadion Wals-Siezenheim
- Bundesliga: 1st
- Austrian Cup: Quarter-finals
- UEFA Champions League: Group stage
- UEFA Europa League: Knockout round play-offs
- Top goalscorer: League: Benjamin Šeško (16); All: Benjamin Šeško (18)
Home colours	Away colours	European home colours

The 2022–23 season was the 90th season in the existence of FC Red Bull Salzburg and the club's 34th consecutive season in the top flight of Austrian football. In addition to the domestic league, Salzburg participated in this season's editions of the Austrian Cup, the UEFA Champions League and the UEFA Europa League.

== Players ==
=== First-team squad ===
As of 27 January 2023

Note: Flags indicate national team as defined under FIFA eligibility rules; some limited exceptions apply. Players may hold more than one non-FIFA nationality.

No.	Pos.	Nation	Player
1	GK	GER	Nico Mantl
2	DF	BEL	Ignace Van der Brempt
3	DF	SUI	Bryan Okoh
4	DF	POL	Kamil Piątkowski
5	DF	AUT	Albert Vallçi
6	DF	AUT	Samson Baidoo
7	MF	ARG	Nicolás Capaldo
8	MF	AUT	Dijon Kameri
9	FW	AUT	Junior Adamu
10	MF	FRA	Antoine Bernède
11	FW	BRA	Fernando
13	MF	AUT	Nicolas Seiwald
14	MF	DEN	Maurits Kjærgaard
15	MF	MLI	Mamady Diambou
17	DF	AUT	Andreas Ulmer (captain)
18	GK	SUI	Philipp Köhn

No.	Pos.	Nation	Player
20	FW	MLI	Sekou Koita
21	MF	CRO	Luka Sučić
22	DF	FRA	Oumar Solet
23	FW	CRO	Roko Šimić
24	MF	MLI	Youba Diarra
27	MF	FRA	Lucas Gourna-Douath
30	FW	SLO	Benjamin Šeško
31	DF	SRB	Strahinja Pavlović
33	GK	GER	Alexander Walke
37	MF	ISR	Oscar Gloukh
39	DF	AUT	Maximilian Wöber
40	GK	CZE	Adam Stejskal
44	MF	NGR	Samson Tijani
70	DF	BIH	Amar Dedić
77	FW	SUI	Noah Okafor
95	DF	BRA	Bernardo

=== Out on loan ===
As of 2 July 2022

Note: Flags indicate national team as defined under FIFA eligibility rules; some limited exceptions apply. Players may hold more than one non-FIFA nationality.

No.	Pos.	Nation	Player
—	DF	MLI	Daouda Guindo (at (Switzerland) St. Gallen until 30 June 2023)
—	DF	GER	Kilian Ludewig (at (Denmark) Aalborg BK until 30 June 2023)
—	MF	GHA	Lawrence Agyekum (at (Austria) FC Liefering until 30 June 2023)
—	FW	CIV	Karim Konaté (at (Austria) FC Liefering until 30 June 2023)

No.	Pos.	Nation	Player
—	MF	MLI	Mamadou Sangare (at (Austria) SV Zulte Waregem until 30 June 2023)
—	MF	GHA	Gideon Mensah (at (France) Bordeaux until 30 June 2022)
—	FW	MLI	Dorgeles Nene (at (Belgium) Westerlo until 30 June 2023)

== Transfers ==
In:

No.	Pos.	Nation	Player
11	FW	BRA	Fernando (from (Ukraine) Shakhtar Donetsk)
27	MF	FRA	Lucas Gourna-Douath (from (France) Saint-Étienne)
31	DF	SRB	Strahinja Pavlović (from (France) Monaco, previously on loan at (Switzerland) Basel)
—	FW	CIV	Karim Konaté (from (Ivory Coast) ASEC Mimosas)
37	MF	ISR	Oscar Gloukh (from (Israel) Maccabi Tel Aviv)

Out:

No.	Pos.	Nation	Player
6	DF	CMR	Jérôme Onguéné (to (Germany) Eintracht Frankfurt)
11	MF	USA	Brenden Aaronson (to (England) Leeds United)
16	MF	AUT	Zlatko Junuzović (retired)
27	FW	GER	Karim Adeyemi (to (Germany) Borussia Dortmund)
39	DF	AUT	Maximilian Wöber (to (England) Leeds United)
43	DF	DEN	Rasmus Kristensen (to (England) Leeds United)
—	FW	CIV	Karim Konaté (on loan to Liefering)
—	DF	GER	Kilian Ludewig (on loan to (Denmark) AaB, previously on loan at (Netherlands) Willem II)
—	DF	MLI	Daouda Guindo (on loan to (Switzerland) St. Gallen, previously on loan at Liefering)
—	MF	GHA	Forson Amankwah (on loan to SCR Altach, previously on loan at Liefering)
—	MF	MLI	Mamadou Sangare (on loan to (Belgium) Zulte Waregem, previously on loan at GAK)
—	FW	MLI	Dorgeles Nene (on loan to (Belgium) Westerlo, previously on loan at Ried)
—	DF	SUI	Jasper van der Werff (to (Germany) Paderborn, previously on loan)
—	DF	BIH	Darko Todorović (to (Russia) Akhmat Grozny, previously on loan)

== Competitions ==
=== Overall record ===
Competition	First match	Last match	Starting round	Final position	Record							
Competition	First match	Last match	Starting round	Final position	Pld	W	D	L	GF	GA	GD	Win %
Bundesliga	22 July 2022	23 May 2023	Matchday 1	Winners	32	23	8	1	67	22	+45	71.88
Austrian Cup	30 August 2022	2 February 2023	First round	Quarter-finals	4	3	1	0	13	2	+11	75.00
Champions League	6 September 2022	2 November 2022	Group stage	Group stage	6	1	3	2	5	9	−4	16.67
Europa League	16 February 2023	23 February 2023	Knockout round play-offs	Knockout round play-offs	2	1	0	1	1	2	−1	50.00
Total					44	28	12	4	86	35	+51	63.64

Source: Soccerway

=== Bundesliga ===
==== League table ====
Pos	Team	Pld	W	D	L	GF	GA	GD	Pts	Qualification
1	Red Bull Salzburg	22	17	4	1	49	13	+36	55	Qualification for the Championship round
2	Sturm Graz	22	14	6	2	37	15	+22	48	Qualification for the Championship round
3	LASK	22	10	8	4	38	28	+10	38	Qualification for the Championship round
4	Rapid Wien	22	10	3	9	34	26	+8	33	Qualification for the Championship round
5	Austria Wien	22	10	5	7	37	31	+6	32 (Note: Austria Wien were deducted 3 points due to license violation.)	Qualification for the Championship round

Source: Austrian Football Bundesliga
Rules for classification: 1) Points; 2) Head-to-head record; 3) Goal difference; 4) Goals scored; 5) Matches won; 6) Away matches won; 7) Away goals scored.

==== Results summary ====
Overall								Home						Away					
Pld	W	D	L	GF	GA	GD	Pts	W	D	L	GF	GA	GD	W	D	L	GF	GA	GD
22	17	4	1	49	13	+36	55	7	4	0	19	4	+15	10	0	1	30	9	+21

Last updated: 19 March 2023.
Source: Austrian Football Bundesliga

==== Results by round ====
Round	1	2	3	4	5	6	7	8	9	10	11	12	13	14	15	16	17	18	19	20	21	22
Ground	H	A	A	H	H	A	H	A	H	H	A	A	H	H	A	A	H	A	H	A	A	H
Result	W	L	W	W	W	W	W	W	D	D	W	W	D	W	W	W	W	W	W	W	W	D
Position	1	7	3	2	2	2	2	1	1	1	1	1	1	1	1	1	1	1	1	1	1	1

Updated to match(es) played on 19 March 2023. Source: Austrian Football Bundesliga
A = Away; H = Home; W = Win; D = Draw; L = Loss

==== Matches ====
22 July 2022 1	Red Bull Salzburg	3–0	Austria Vienna	Salzburg
19:30 CEST (UTC+2)	Šeško 38'; Fernando 56'; Okafor 61', (yellow card) 69'	Report	Braunöder (yellow card) 49'; Keles (yellow card) 58'	Stadium: Wals–Siezenheim; Attendance: 11,156; Referee: Rene Eisner

30 July 2022 2	Sturm Graz	2–1	Red Bull Salzburg	Graz
18:30 CEST (UTC+2)	Højlund 23', 51'; Stanković (yellow card) 89'; Prass (yellow card) 89'	Report	Seiwald (yellow card) 47'; Wöber (yellow card) 80'; Solet (yellow card) 80'; Kjærgaard 87'; Sučić (yellow card) 90+2'	Stadium: Merkur–Arena; Attendance: 12,317; Referee: Julian Weinberger

6 August 2022 3	Hartberg	0–2	Red Bull Salzburg	Hartberg
18:30 CEST (UTC+2)	Swete (yellow card) 77'	Report	Pavlović (yellow card) 40'; Fernando 50'; Capaldo 61'; Šimić (yellow card) 77'; Diambou (yellow card) 84' (yellow-red card) 90'	Stadium: Profertil Arena Hartberg; Attendance: 2,790; Referee: Harald Lechner

14 August 2022 4	Red Bull Salzburg	2–1	Wolfsberger AC	Salzburg
16:00 CEST (UTC+2)	Pavlović 20'; Šeško 41'; Wöber (yellow card) 90+3'	Report	Vizinger 90+3'	Stadium: Wals–Siezenheim; Attendance: 11,769; Referee: Alexander Harkam

20 August 2022 5	Red Bull Salzburg	2–0	Austria Klagenfurt	Salzburg
16:00 CEST (UTC+2)	Sučić (yellow card) 22'; Fernando 51'; Okafor 68'; Capaldo (yellow card) 82'	Report	Djoric (yellow card) 84'	Stadium: Wals–Siezenheim; Attendance: 10,159; Referee: Josef Spurny

27 August 2022 6	Austria Lustenau	0–6	Red Bull Salzburg	Lustenau
16:00 CEST (UTC+2)	Grabher (yellow card) 90+1'	Report	Fernando 16'; Kjærgaard 20'; Solet (yellow card) 35'; Capaldo 49'; Okafor 60'; Adamu 79'; Kameri 82'	Stadium: Planet Pure Stadion; Attendance: 4,278; Referee: Stefan Ebner

3 September 2022 7	Red Bull Salzburg	2–0	WSG Tirol	Salzburg
16:00 CEST (UTC+2)	Okafor 14'; Ulmer (yellow card) 48'; Dedić (yellow card) 67'; Diarra 79'	Report	Schulz (yellow card) 29'; Rinaldi (yellow card) 85'; Rogelj (yellow card) 90+3'	Stadium: Wals–Siezenheim; Attendance: 10,057; Referee: Harald Lechner

9 September 2022 8	SV Ried	0–3	Red Bull Salzburg	Ried
16:00 CEST (UTC+2)	Mikić (red card) 42'; Kronberger (yellow card) 82'	Report	Šeško 5'; Adamu 15', (yellow card) 45+2' (yellow-red card) 54'; Okafor 71'	Stadium: Josko Arena; Attendance: 5,568; Referee: Mag. Markus Hameter

18 September 2022 9	Red Bull Salzburg	1–1	Rapid Wien	Salzburg
17:00 CEST (UTC+2)	Šeško 1'; Dedić (yellow card) 90+3'	Report	Querfeld 22'; Burgstaller (yellow card) 40'; Kerschbaum (yellow card) 75'; Sollbauer (yellow card) 90+3'	Stadium: Red Bull Arena; Attendance: 15,785; Referee: Alexander Harkam

1 October 2022 10	Red Bull Salzburg	1–1	LASK Linz	Salzburg
17:00 CEST (UTC+2)	Dedić (yellow card) 30'; Solet 90+5'	Report	Ljubičić 79'	Stadium: Red Bull Arena; Attendance: 14,780; Referee: Harald Lechner

8 October 2022 11	Rheindorf Altach	2–3	Red Bull Salzburg	Altach
17:00 CEST (UTC+2)	Tibidi 57'; Nuhiu 78'	Report	Wöber 52'; Koïta 59'; Adamu 72'	Stadium: Cashpoint Arena; Attendance: 4,689; Referee: Walter Altmann

16 October 2022 12	Austria Wien	1–3	Red Bull Salzburg	Wien
17:00 CEST (UTC+2)	Fitz 37', (yellow card) 49'; Dovedan (yellow card) 71'	Report	Adamu 11', 74', 80'; Šeško (yellow card) 45'; Sučić (yellow card) 70'; Pavlović (yellow card) 71'; Solet (yellow card) 73'	Stadium: Generali Arena; Attendance: 10,896; Referee: Mag. Markus Hameter

22 October 2022 13	Red Bull Salzburg	0–0	Sturm Graz	Salzburg
16:00 CEST (UTC+2)	Agyekum (yellow card) 28'; Pavlović (yellow card) 57' (yellow-red card) 90+2'; Kjærgaard (yellow card) 90+3'	Report	Gazibegović (yellow card) 78'; Affengruber (yellow card) 80'; Stanković (yellow card) 82'	Stadium: Red Bull Arena; Attendance: 15,725; Referee: Stefan Ebner

29 October 2022 14	Red Bull Salzburg	1–0	Hartberg	Salzburg
16:00 CEST (UTC+2)	Okafor 48'	Report		Stadium: Red Bull Arena; Attendance: 10,345; Referee: Gerhard Grobelnik

5 November 2022 15	Wolfsberger AC	1–2	Red Bull Salzburg	Wolfsberg
16:00 CEST (UTC+2)	Malone 75'	Report	Okafor 17'; Adamu 42'	Stadium: Lavanttal-Arena; Attendance: 3,325; Referee: Julian Weinberger

13 November 2022 16	Austria Klagenfurt	0–1	Red Bull Salzburg	Klagenfurt
13:30 CEST (UTC+2)	Gezos (yellow card) 36'; Irving (yellow card) 50'; Đorić (yellow card) 90+4'	Report	Bernardo (yellow card) 24'; Šeško 55'; Köhn (yellow card) 80'; Dedić (yellow card) 90+4'	Stadium: Wörthersee Stadion; Attendance: 5,933; Referee: Christian-Petru Ciochirca

11 February 2023 17	Red Bull Salzburg	4–0	Austria Lustenau	Salzburg
16:00 CEST (UTC+2)	Okafor (yellow card) 12'; Gourna-Douath (yellow card) 13'; Kjærgaard (yellow card) 34'; Fernando 48', 52'; Seiwald 76'; Capaldo 90+1'	Report	Fridrikas (yellow card) 2'; Türkmen (yellow card) 45'	Stadium: Red Bull Arena; Attendance: 7,507; Referee: Mag. Markus Hameter

19 February 2023 18	WSG Tirol	1–3	Red Bull Salzburg	Wattens
13:30 CEST (UTC+2)	Tomic 90+1'	Report	Schulz 2' (o.g.); Šeško 56'; Ulmer (yellow card) 58'; Konaté 85'	Stadium: Tivoli Stadion Tirol; Attendance: 5,300; Referee: Alain Sadikovski

26 February 2023 19	Red Bull Salzburg	2–0	SV Ried	Salzburg
16:00 CEST (UTC+2)	Capaldo 19'; Pavlović (yellow card) 63'; Koïta 88'	Report	Jurišić (yellow card) 2'; Wendlinger (yellow card) 84'; Michael (yellow card) 86'	Stadium: Red Bull Arena; Attendance: 7,721; Referee: Alexander Harkam

5 March 2023 20	Rapid Wien	2–4	Red Bull Salzburg	Vienna
16:00 CEST (UTC+2)	Auer (yellow card) 25'; Zimmermann 45'; Pejić (yellow card) 69'; Burgstaller 90+5'	Report	Seiwald 4', (yellow card) 37'; Pavlović (yellow card) 7'; Capaldo (yellow card) 25'; Köhn (yellow card) 45'; Adamu (yellow card) 62'; Šeško 80', 84', 87'	Stadium: Franz Horr Stadium; Attendance: 24,200; Referee: Dieter Muckenhammer

12 March 2023 21	LASK Linz	0–2	Red Bull Salzburg	Linz
16:00 CEST (UTC+2)		Report	Koïta 53'; Seiwald 72'	Stadium: Raiffeisen Arena; Attendance: 18,000; Referee: Alan Kijas

19 March 2023 22	Red Bull Salzburg	1–1	Rheindorf Altach	Salzburg
16:00 CEST (UTC+2)	Gourna-Douath (yellow card) 54'; Solet (yellow card) 73'; Šeško 83'	Report	Abdijanovic (yellow card) 52'; Nuhiu 55', (yellow card) 61'; Strauß (yellow card) 59'; Herold (yellow card) 75'; Bukta (yellow card) 90+6'	Stadium: Red Bull Arena; Attendance: 9,708; Referee: Harald Lechner

=== Austrian Cup ===
15 July 2022 First round	SV Fügen	0–3	Red Bull Salzburg	Fügen
15:30 CEST (UTC+2)			Šeško 20'; Adamu 75'; Van der Brempt 83'	Stadium: Parkstadion Zell/Ziller; Attendance: 1,500; Referee: Arnes Talic

30 August 2022 Second round	Red Bull Salzburg	3–0	Union Raiffeisen Gurten	Salzburg
15:30 CEST (UTC+2)	Schütz 45+1' (o.g.); Diarra (yellow card) 51'; Kameri 64'; Dedić (yellow card) 68'; Adamu 83'; Gourna-Douath (yellow card) 87'		Horner (yellow card) 40'; Schnaitter (yellow card) 44'	Stadium: Stadion Wals-Siezenheim; Attendance: 3,900; Referee: Oliver Fluch

19 October 2022 Third round	Admira Wacker	1–6	Red Bull Salzburg	Mödling
19:30 CEST (UTC+2)	Zwierschitz 50'; Gallé (yellow card) 56'		Wöber 2'; Pavlović 25'; Šeško 32'; Adamu 41'; Dedić 65'; Šimić 75'	Stadium: motion invest Arena; Attendance: 1,650; Referee: Christian-Petru Ciochirca

2 February 2023 Quarter-finals	Red Bull Salzburg	1–1 (a.e.t.) (4–5 p)	Sturm Graz	Salzburg
17:00 CET (UTC+1)	Solet (yellow card) 30'; Capaldo (yellow card) 62'; Dedić (yellow card) 74' (goal) 77'	Report	Gazibegović 37'; Stanković (yellow card) 90+4'	Stadium: Stadion Wals-Siezenheim; Attendance: 9,236; Referee: Julian Weinberger
	Penalties
	Okafor (penalty scored); Adamu (penalty scored); Šeško (penalty scored); Kjærgaard (penalty missed); Solet (penalty scored); Capaldo (penalty missed)		(penalty missed) Sarkaria; (penalty scored) Ljubic; (penalty scored) Schnegg; (penalty scored) Teixeira; (penalty scored) Dante; (penalty scored) Wüthrich

=== UEFA Champions League ===
==== Group stage ====
The draw for the group stage was held on 25 August 2022 in Istanbul, Turkey. Die Roten Bullen were drawn against Milan, Chelsea and Dinamo Zagreb.

Pos	Team	Pld	W	D	L	GF	GA	GD	Pts	Qualification
1	(England) Chelsea	6	4	1	1	10	4	+6	13	Advance to knockout phase
2	(Italy) Milan	6	3	1	2	12	7	+5	10	Advance to knockout phase
3	(Austria) Red Bull Salzburg	6	1	3	2	5	9	−4	6	Transfer to Europa League
4	(Croatia) Dinamo Zagreb	6	1	1	4	4	11	−7	4	

Source: UEFA
Rules for classification: Group stage tiebreakers

6 September 2022 1	Red Bull Salzburg (Austria)	1–1	(Italy) Milan	Salzburg, Austria
21:00 CEST (UTC+2)	Capaldo (yellow card) 17'; Okafor 28'; Gourna-Douath (yellow card) 68'	Report	Tomori (yellow card) 39'; Saelemaekers 40'; Calabria (yellow card) 44'; Brahim (yellow card) 89'; Origi (yellow card) 90+2'	Stadium: Stadion Wals-Siezenheim; Attendance: 29,520; Referee: Srđan Jovanović (Serbia)

14 September 2022 2	Chelsea (England)	1–1	(Austria) Red Bull Salzburg	London, England
21:00 CEST (UTC+2)	Sterling 48'; James (yellow card) 79'	Report	Okafor 75'; Adamu (yellow card) 76'; Pavlović (yellow card) 77'; Ulmer (yellow card) 78'; Capaldo (yellow card) 89'	Stadium: Stamford Bridge; Attendance: 38,818; Referee: Ivan Kružliak (Slovakia)

5 October 2022 3	Red Bull Salzburg (Austria)	1–0	(Croatia) Dinamo Zagreb	Salzburg, Austria
18:45 CEST (UTC+2)	Okafor 71' (pen.)	Report	Petković (yellow card) 27'; Moharrami (yellow card) 68'; Ristovski (yellow card) 90+4'; Ademi (yellow card) 90+5'	Stadium: Stadion Wals-Siezenheim; Attendance: 28,864; Referee: Andris Treimanis (Latvia)

11 October 2022 4	Dinamo Zagreb (Croatia)	1–1	(Austria) Red Bull Salzburg	Zagreb, Croatia
21:00 CEST (UTC+2)	Ljubičić 40'; Ivanušec (yellow card) 52'	Report	Seiwald 12'; Pavlović (yellow card) 90'; Sučić (yellow card) 90+3'	Stadium: Stadion Maksimir; Attendance: 20,779; Referee: Tobias Stieler (Germany)

25 October 2022 5	Red Bull Salzburg (Austria)	1–2	(England) Chelsea	Salzburg, Austria
18:45 CEST (UTC+2)	Sučić (yellow card) 47'; Adamu 48'	Report	Kovačić 23'; Havertz 64'; Gallagher (yellow card) 86'; Arrizabalaga (yellow card) 90+2'	Stadium: Stadion Wals-Siezenheim; Attendance: 29,520; Referee: Sandro Schärer (Switzerland)

2 November 2022 6	Milan (Italy)	4–0	(Austria) Red Bull Salzburg	Milan, Italy
21:00 CET (UTC+1)	Giroud 14', 57'; Krunić 46'; Messias 90+1'	Report	Okafor (yellow card) 44'; Gourna-Douath (yellow card) 61'	Stadium: San Siro; Attendance: 74,292; Referee: Antonio Mateu Lahoz (Spain)

=== UEFA Europa League ===
==== Knockout phase ====
===== Knockout round play-offs =====
The draw for the knockout round play-offs was held on 7 November 2022 in Nyon, Switzerland. Die Roten Bullen were drawn against Roma.

16 February 2023 First leg	Red Bull Salzburg (Austria)	1–0	(Italy) Roma	Salzburg, Austria
17:45 CET (UTC+1)	Pavlović (yellow card) 84'; Koïta (yellow card) 86'; Capaldo 88'; Gloukh (yellow card) 90+4'	Report	Ibañez (yellow card) 90+2'	Stadium: Stadion Wals-Siezenheim; Attendance: 29,520; Referee: Dennis Higler (Netherlands)

23 February 2023 Second leg	Roma (Italy)	2–0 (2–1 agg.)	(Austria) Red Bull Salzburg	Rome, Italy
20:00 CET (UTC+1)	Ibañez (yellow card) 4'; Pellegrini (yellow card) 5'; Belotti 33'; Dybala 40'; Spinazzola (yellow card) 54'; Zalewski (yellow card) 74'	Report		Stadium: Stadio Olimpico; Attendance: 62,593; Referee: Slavko Vinčić (Slovenia)
