= Jonas Krumrey =

German footballer

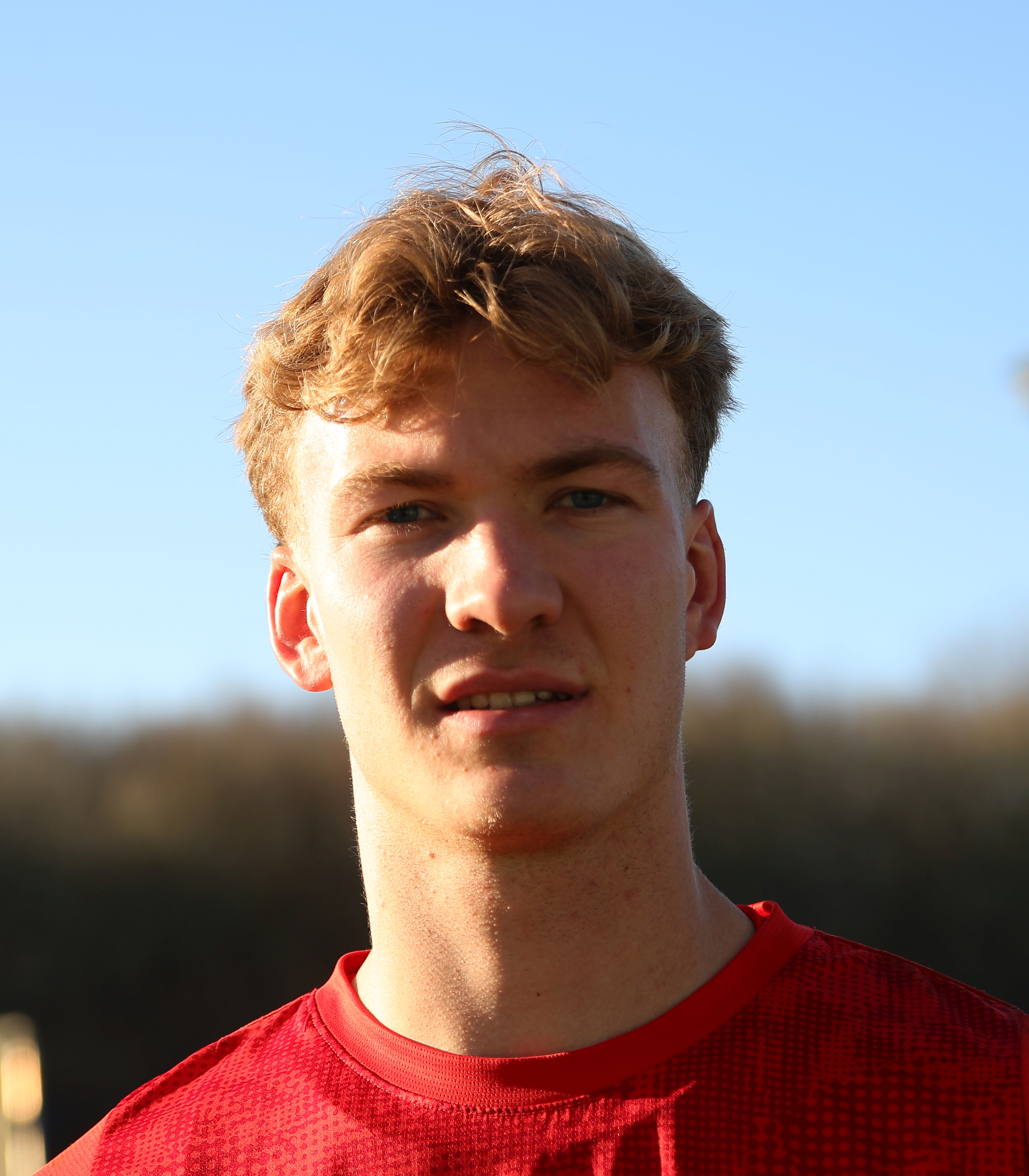
- Krumrey in 2026

Personal information
- Full name: Jonas Krumrey
- Date of birth: 25 November 2003 (age 22)
- Place of birth: Prien am Chiemsee, Germany
- Height: 1.91 m (6 ft 3 in)
- Position: Goalkeeper

Team information
- Current team: VfL Osnabrück (on loan from Holstein Kiel)
- Number: 32

Youth career
- –2016: TSV 1860 Rosenheim
- 2016–2017: Bayern Munich
- 2017–2020: Red Bull Salzburg

Senior career*
Years	Team	Apps	(Gls)
2020–2024	FC Liefering	57	(0)
2023–2025	Red Bull Salzburg	0	(0)
2024–2025	→ Lyngby (loan)	3	(0)
2025–	Holstein Kiel	22	(0)
2026–	→ VfL Osnabrück (loan)	0	(0)
- * Club domestic league appearances and goals as of 18 May 2026

Jonas Krumrey (born 25 November 2003) is a German professional footballer who plays as a goalkeeper for 2. Bundesliga club VfL Osnabrück, on loan from Holstein Kiel.

== Career ==
Krumray started his career with the youth academies of both TSV 1860 Rosenheim and Bayern Munich. In 2017 he went on to the Red Bull Salzburg Academy, where he played at all three levels. Then he became 3rd goalkeeper of FC Liefering behind Daniel Antosch and Adam Stejskal. In June 2021 he signed a contract with Red Bull Salzburg lasting till 2025.

On 13 August 2021, he played his first match for FC Liefering versus SKU Amstetten. where he was part of the Starting XI.

On 20 August 2024, Krumrey joined Danish Superliga club Lyngby on loan until the end of the 2024–25 season.

On 1 July 2025, Krumrey signed a two-year contract with Holstein Kiel. On 16 June 2026, he was loaned by VfL Osnabrück.

== Career statistics ==
As of 25 November 2023

Appearances and goals by club, season and competition
Club	Season	League			Cup		Continental		Other		Total	
Club	Season	Division	Apps	Goals	Apps	Goals	Apps	Goals	Apps	Goals	Apps	Goals
FC Liefering	2021–22	2. Liga	11	0	0	0	–		0	0	11	0
FC Liefering	2022–23	2. Liga	26	0	0	0	–		0	0	26	0
FC Liefering	2023–24	2. Liga	12	0	0	0	–		0	0	12	0
FC Liefering	Total		49	0	0	0	–		0	0	49	0
Red Bull Salzburg	2023–24	Austrian Bundesliga	0	0	0	0	0	0	0	0	0	0
Career total			49	0	0	0	0	0	0	0	49	0
