= Amar Dedić =

Bosnian footballer (born 2002)

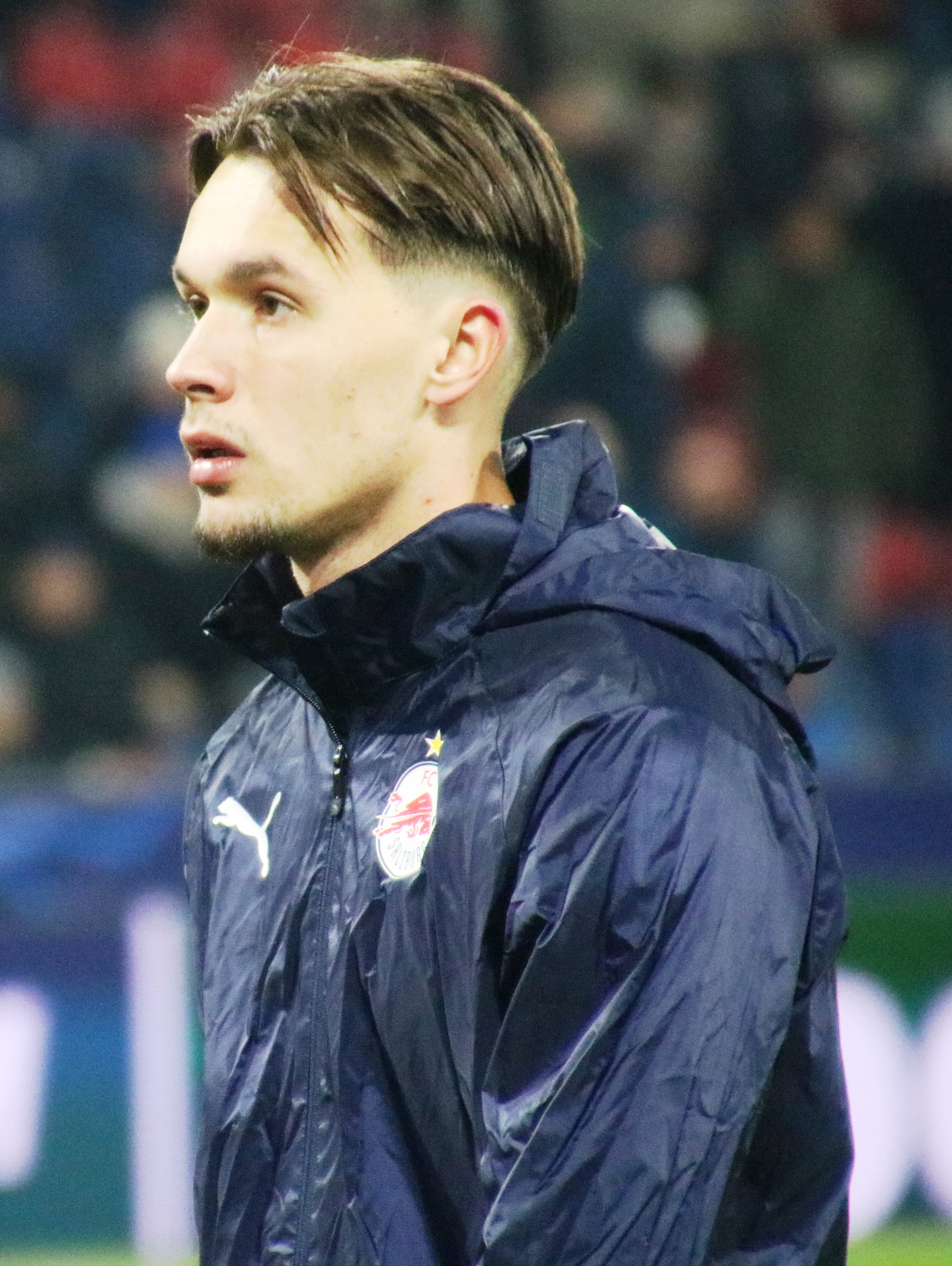
- Dedić with Red Bull Salzburg in 2024

Personal information
- Date of birth: 18 August 2002 (age 24)
- Place of birth: Zell am See, Austria
- Height: 1.80 m (5 ft 11 in)
- Position: Right-back

Team information
- Current team: Newcastle United
- Number: 37

Youth career
- 2008–2012: LUV Graz
- 2012–2015: Sturm Graz
- 2015–2019: Red Bull Salzburg

Senior career*
Years	Team	Apps	(Gls)
2019–2025	Red Bull Salzburg	60	(4)
2019–2021	Liefering	50	(2)
2021–2022	→ Wolfsberger AC (loan)	32	(2)
2025	→ Marseille (loan)	10	(0)
2025–2026	Benfica	25	(1)
2026–	Newcastle United	9	(0)

International career^{‡}
2018–2019	Bosnia and Herzegovina U17	12	(0)
2019	Bosnia and Herzegovina U19	7	(0)
2021	Bosnia and Herzegovina U21	5	(1)
2022–	Bosnia and Herzegovina	33	(1)
- * Club domestic league appearances and goals as of 21 November 2026 ‡ National team caps and goals as of 17 November 2026

Amar Dedić (pronounced [ǎmar dêːditɕ]; born 18 August 2002) is a professional footballer who plays as a right-back for Premier League club Newcastle United. Born in Austria, he plays for the Bosnia and Herzegovina national team.

Dedić started his professional career at Red Bull Salzburg, who assigned him to Liefering in 2019 and loaned him to Wolfsberger AC in 2021 and to Marseille in 2025. Later that year, he signed with Benfica. The following year, he joined Newcastle United.

A former youth international for Bosnia and Herzegovina, Dedić made his senior international debut in 2022, earning over 30 caps since. He represented the nation at the 2026 FIFA World Cup.

== Club career ==
=== Red Bull Salzburg ===
Dedić started playing football at a local club, before joining Sturm Graz's youth setup in 2012. In 2015, he moved to Red Bull Salzburg's youth academy. In August 2019, he signed his first professional contract with the team. He made his professional debut playing for Red Bull Salzburg's feeder squad, Liefering, against Amstetten on 26 July at the age of 16. On 19 June 2020, he scored his first professional goal in a triumph over Dornbirn.

In July, Dedić signed a new four-year deal with Red Bull Salzburg. He made his official debut for the club in an Austrian Cup game against Bregenz on 9 September.

In June 2021, he was sent on a season-long loan to Wolfsberger AC.

Dedić made his league debut for Red Bull Salzburg on 6 August 2022 against Hartberg. He debuted in the UEFA Champions League against Milan on 6 September. On 19 October, he scored his first goal for the side in an Austrian Cup match against Admira Wacker.

In January 2023, he extended his contract with the team until June 2027.

He won his first trophy with the club on 21 May, when they were crowned league champions and managed to score his first league goal in a defeat of Sturm Graz.

In February 2025, he was loaned to French outfit Marseille until the end of the season.

=== Benfica ===
In June, Dedić was transferred to Portuguese side Benfica for an undisclosed fee. He made his competitive debut for the club in the 2025 Supertaça Cândido de Oliveira match against Sporting CP on 31 July and managed to win his first trophy. Two weeks later, he made his league debut against Estrela. On 31 August, he scored his first goal for Benfica in a victory over Alverca.

=== Newcastle United ===
Dedić playing for Newcastle United against Fulham on 7 November 2026.

In August 2026, Dedić moved to English team Newcastle United on a five-year deal. The transfer fee was reportedly £29.5m. The move also saw him reunited with Matthias Jaissle, his former coach at both FC Liefering and RB Salzburg. He debuted officially for the squad on 23 August against Liverpool. He followed up his debut with two assists in Newcastle's 3–2 Carabao Cup win against West Bromwich Albion.

== International career ==
Dedić represented Bosnia and Herzegovina at all youth levels. He also served as a captain of the under-17 team.

In March 2022, he received his first senior call up, for friendly games against Georgia and Luxembourg. He debuted against the latter on 29 March.

On 23 March 2023, in a UEFA Euro 2024 qualifier against Iceland, he scored his first senior international goal.

In June 2026, Dedić was named in Bosnia and Herzegovina's squad for the 2026 FIFA World Cup. He made his tournament debut in the opening group match against Canada on 12 June.

== Personal life ==
Dedić is a practising Muslim; together with international teammates Ermedin Demirović, Tarik Muharemović and Dženis Burnić he visited a mosque in Sarajevo during the national team's concentration.

== Career statistics ==
=== Club ===
As of match played 21 November 2026

Appearances and goals by club, season and competition
Club	Season	League			National cup (Note: Includes Austrian Cup, Taça de Portugal)		League cup (Note: Includes Taça da Liga, EFL Cup)		Continental		Other		Total	
Club	Season	Division	Apps	Goals	Apps	Goals	Apps	Goals	Apps	Goals	Apps	Goals	Apps	Goals
Liefering	2019–20	2. Liga	24	2	–		–		–		–		24	2
Liefering	2020–21	2. Liga	26	0	–		–		–		–		26	0
Liefering	Total		50	2	–		–		–		–		50	2
Red Bull Salzburg	2020–21	Austrian Bundesliga	0	0	1	0	–		0	0	–		1	0
Red Bull Salzburg	2022–23	Austrian Bundesliga	27	1	3	2	–		8 (Note: Six appearances in UEFA Champions League; two appearances in UEFA Europa League)	0	–		38	3
Red Bull Salzburg	2023–24	Austrian Bundesliga	21	3	4	2	–		6 (Note: Appearances in UEFA Champions League)	0	–		31	5
Red Bull Salzburg	2024–25	Austrian Bundesliga	12	0	2	0	–		11	0	–		25	0
Red Bull Salzburg	Total		60	4	10	4	–		25	0	–		95	8
Wolfsberger AC (loan)	2021–22	Austrian Bundesliga	32	2	5	1	–		–		–		37	3
Marseille (loan)	2024–25	Ligue 1	10	0	–		–		–		–		10	0
Benfica	2025–26	Primeira Liga	24	1	3	0	1	0	14	0	1 (Note: Appearance in Supertaça Cândido de Oliveira)	0	43	1
Benfica	2026–27	Primeira Liga	1	0	0	0	0	0	2 (Note: Appearances in UEFA Europa League)	0	–		3	0
Benfica	Total		25	1	3	0	1	0	16	0	1	0	46	1
Newcastle United	2026–27	Premier League	9	0	0	0	3	0	–		–		12	0
Career total			186	9	18	5	4	0	41	0	1	0	250	14

=== International ===
As of match played 17 November 2026

Appearances and goals by national team and year
National team	Year	Apps	Goals
Bosnia and Herzegovina
Bosnia and Herzegovina	2022	3	0
Bosnia and Herzegovina	2023	9	1
Bosnia and Herzegovina	2024	4	0
Bosnia and Herzegovina	2025	8	0
Bosnia and Herzegovina	2026	9	0
Total		33	1

Scores and results list Bosnia and Herzegovina's goal tally first, score column indicates score after each Dedić goal.

List of international goals scored by Amar Dedić
No.	Date	Venue	Cap	Opponent	Score	Result	Competition
1	23 March 2023	Bilino Polje, Zenica, Bosnia and Herzegovina	4	Iceland	3–0	3–0	UEFA Euro 2024 qualifying

== Honours ==
Red Bull Salzburg

- Austrian Bundesliga: 2022–23

Benfica

- Supertaça Cândido de Oliveira: 2025
