= Daouda Guindo =

Malian footballer (born 2002)

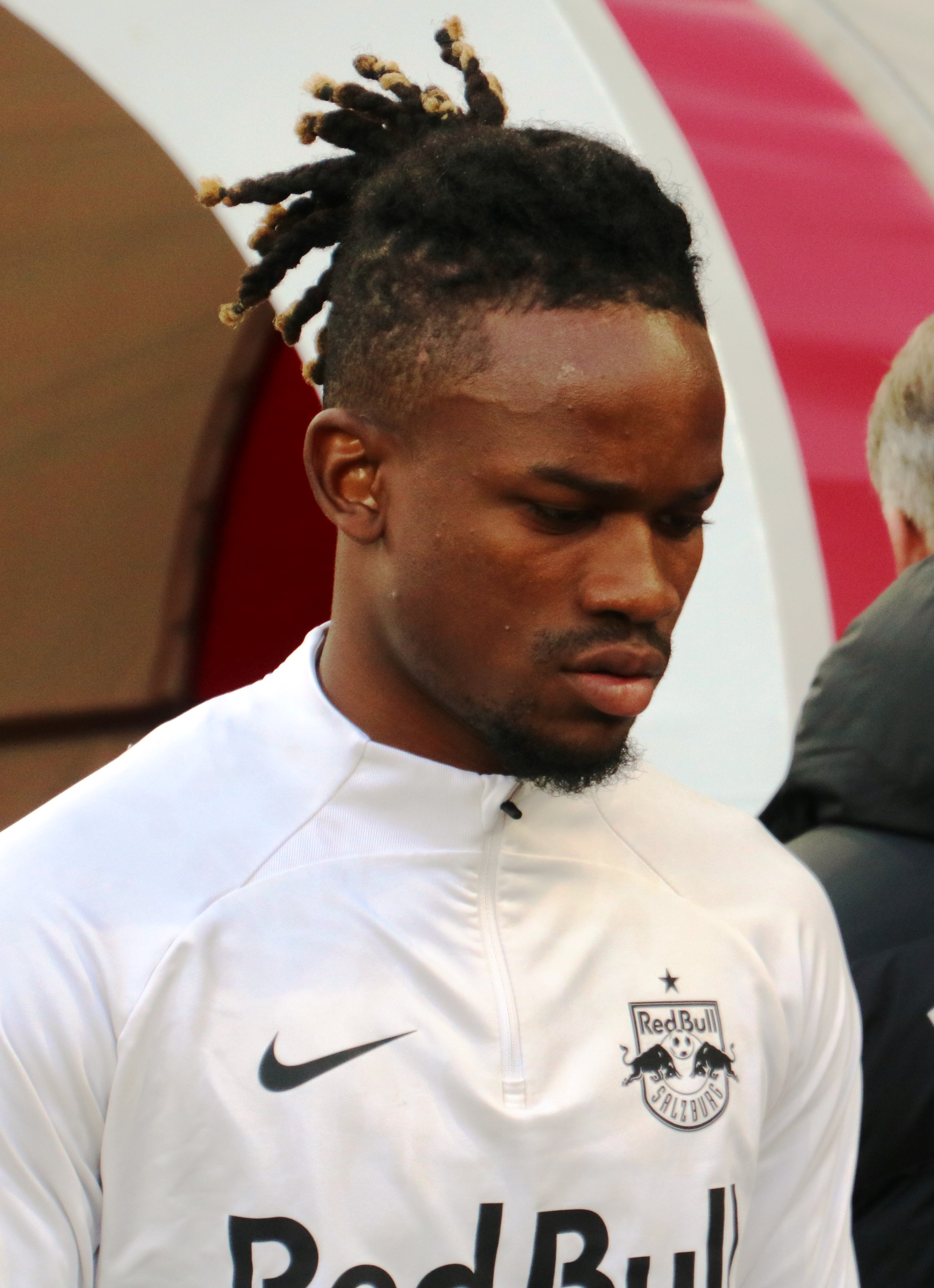
- Guindo in 2024

Personal information
- Date of birth: 14 October 2002 (age 24)
- Place of birth: Mali
- Height: 1.83 m (6 ft 0 in)
- Position: Left-back

Team information
- Current team: Reims
- Number: 27

Youth career
- 2019–2021: Guidars FC

Senior career*
Years	Team	Apps	(Gls)
2021–2025	Red Bull Salzburg	35	(0)
2021–2022	→ FC Liefering (loan)	23	(2)
2022	→ St. Gallen (loan)	15	(1)
2025–2026	Brest	25	(1)
2026–	Reims	7	(0)

International career^{‡}
2022–	Mali	7	(0)
- * Club domestic league appearances and goals as of 19 September 2026 ‡ National team caps and goals as of 21:01, 4 October 2026 (UTC)

Daouda Guindo (born 14 October 2002) is a Malian professional footballer who plays as a left-back for French Ligue 2 club Reims and the Mali national team.

== Club career ==
=== Red Bull Salzburg ===
In January 2021, Guindo signed with Austrian club Red Bull Salzburg, signing a four-year contract and leaving his native Mali. He was immediately loaned to Red Bull Salzburg's feeder club, FC Liefering. He made his debut for the club on 12 February 2021, playing the entirety of a 3–1 home victory over Austria Lustenau.

On 6 November 2024, Guindo scored his first goal in the UEFA Champions League in a 1-3 victory over Feyenoord.

He became a free agent after his contract ran out at the end of the 2024–25.

==== Loan to St. Gallen ====
On 27 June 2022, Guindo was loaned to St. Gallen in Switzerland for the 2022–23 season. He made his debut for the club on the first matchday of the season, coming on as a half-time substitute for Leonidas Stergiou in a 1–0 away loss to Servette. A strong start to the season individually was capped off with his first assist on 6 August in the 3–2 league loss to Grasshopper.

=== Brest ===
Guindo moved to France, and signed with Ligue 1 club Brest as a free agent on 26 August 2025.

=== Reims ===
On 18 June 2026, Guindo joined Reims in Ligue 2 on a five-year contract.

== International career ==
Guindo was called up to the Mali national team for matches in June 2022.

== Career statistics ==
=== Club ===
As of match played 19 September 2026

Club	Season	League			National Cup		Europe		Total	
Club	Season	Division	Apps	Goals	Apps	Goals	Apps	Goals	Apps	Goals
FC Liefering (loan)	2020–21	2. Liga	16	0	—		—		16	0
FC Liefering (loan)	2021–22	2. Liga	7	2	—		—		7	2
FC Liefering (loan)	Total		23	2	—		—		23	2
Red Bull Salzburg	2021–22	Austrian Bundesliga	7	0	3	1	1 (Note: Appearance in UEFA Champions League)	0	11	1
Red Bull Salzburg	2022–23	Austrian Bundesliga	0	0	0	0	0	0	0	0
Red Bull Salzburg	2023–24	Austrian Bundesliga	18	0	3	0	0	0	21	0
Red Bull Salzburg	2024–25	Austrian Bundesliga	10	0	1	0	4	1	15	1
Red Bull Salzburg	Total		35	0	7	1	5	1	47	2
St. Gallen (loan)	2022–23	Swiss Super League	15	0	2	0	—		17	1
Brest	2025–26	Ligue 1	25	1	1	0	—		26	1
Reims	2026–27	Ligue 2	7	0	0	0	—		7	0
Career total			105	4	10	1	5	1	120	6

=== International ===
As of match played 4 October 2026

Appearances and goals by national team and year
National team	Year	Apps	Goals
Mali	2022	1	0
Mali	2024	3	0
Mali	2026	3	0
Total		7	0

== Honours ==
- Austrian Bundesliga: 2021-22
- Austrian Cup: 2021-22
