= Alexander Schlager =

Austrian footballer (born 1996)

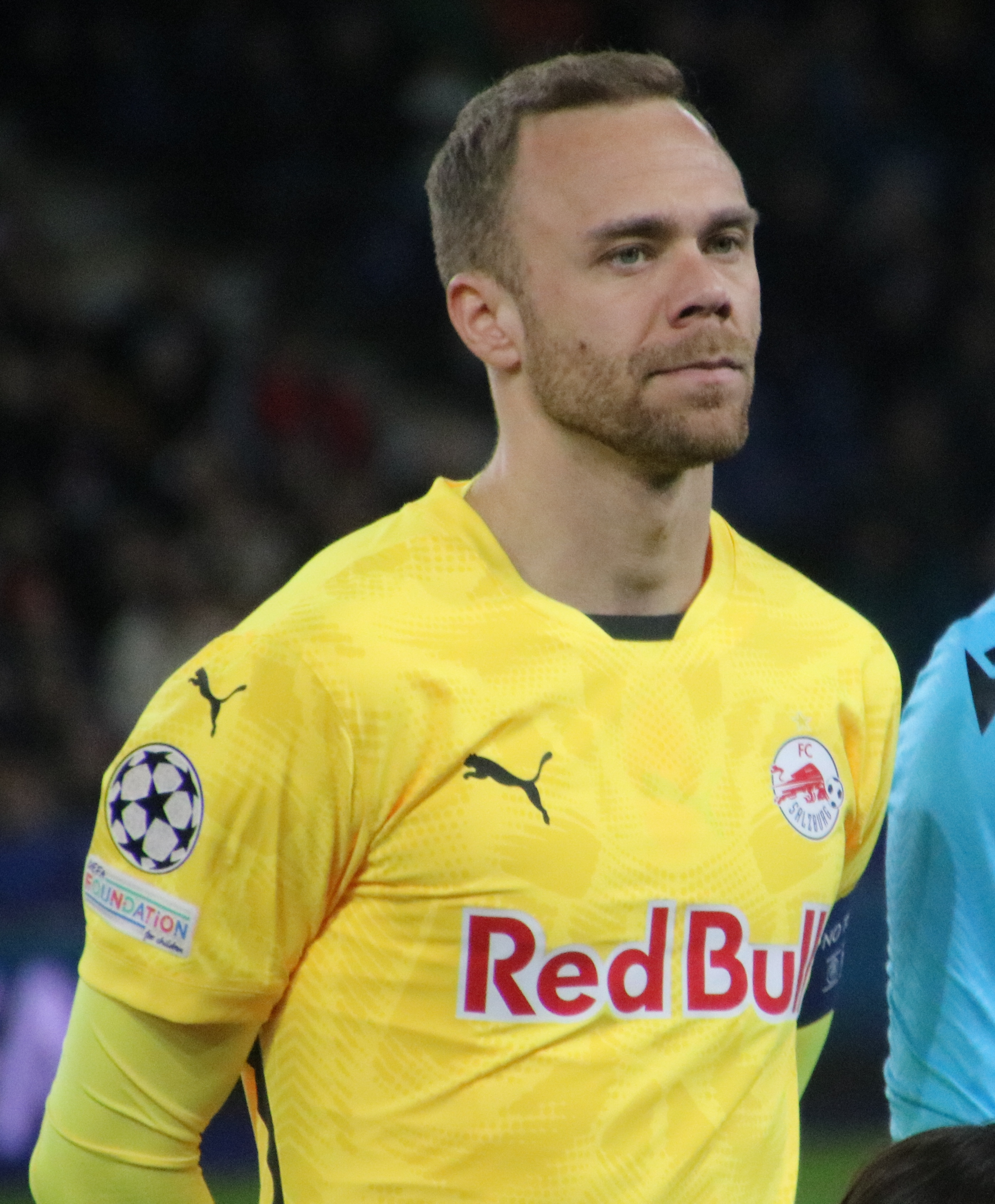
- Schlager with Red Bull Salzburg in 2025

Personal information
- Date of birth: 1 February 1996 (age 30)
- Place of birth: Salzburg, Austria
- Height: 1.88 m (6 ft 2 in)
- Position: Goalkeeper

Team information
- Current team: Werder Bremen
- Number: 30

Youth career
- 2002–2005: ASK Salzburg
- 2005–2007: Red Bull Salzburg
- 2007: ASK Maxglan
- 2007–2009: Austria Salzburg
- 2009–2015: Red Bull Salzburg
- 2014–2015: → RB Leipzig (loan)

Senior career*
| Years | Team | Apps | (Gls) |
| 2012–2015 | Red Bull Salzburg | 0 | (0) |
| 2012–2017 | FC Liefering | 0 | (0) |
| 2014–2015 | → RB Leipzig (loan) | 0 | (0) |
| 2015–2016 | → SV Grödig (loan) | 10 | (0) |
| 2016–2017 | → Floridsdorfer AC (loan) | 23 | (0) |
| 2017–2023 | LASK | 152 | (0) |
| 2023–2026 | Red Bull Salzburg | 80 | (0) |
| 2026– | Werder Bremen | 0 | (0) |

International career^{‡}
| 2015–2019 | Austria U21 | 15 | (0) |
| 2019– | Austria | 33 | (0) |
- * Club domestic league appearances and goals as of 17 May 2026 (UTC) ‡ National team caps and goals as of 14 November 2026

Alexander Schlager (born 1 February 1996) is an Austrian professional footballer who plays as a goalkeeper for Bundesliga club Werder Bremen and the Austria national team.

== Club career ==
Schlager started his career at Red Bull Salzburg, before joining LASK in 2017. In May 2023, he returned to Red Bull Salzburg by signing a contract until 2027.

Schlager moved to Bundesliga club Werder Bremen in July 2026.

== International career ==
Schlager was the captain for Austria U-21 in 2019 Euro U-21.

On 16 November 2019, he played his first match for Austria's national team in the deciding Euro 2020 qualifier against North Macedonia, which ended in a 2–1 victory in Vienna. In May 2021, he was named in the 26-man squad for the postponed Euro 2020. In May 2024, he sustained a knee injury which would force him to miss the upcoming Euro 2024.

On 18 May 2026, Schlager was selected in Ralf Rangnick’s 26-man squad for the 2026 FIFA World Cup, marking Austria’s first appearance in the tournament since 1998.

== Career statistics ==
=== Club ===
As of match played 22 August 2026

Appearances and goals by club, season and competition
| Club | Season | League | | | National cup (Note: Includes Austrian Cup.) | | Continental | | Other | | Total | |
| Club | Season | Division | Apps | Goals | Apps | Goals | Apps | Goals | Apps | Goals | Apps | Goals |
|---|---|---|---|---|---|---|---|---|---|---|---|---|
| SV Grödig (loan) | 2015–16 | Austrian Bundesliga | 10 | 0 | 0 | 0 | — | | — | | 10 | 0 |
| Floridsdorfer AC (loan) | 2016–17 | 2. Liga | 23 | 0 | 1 | 0 | — | | — | | 24 | 0 |
| LASK | 2017–18 | Austrian Bundesliga | 1 | 0 | 0 | 0 | — | | — | | 1 | 0 |
| LASK | 2018–19 | Austrian Bundesliga | 31 | 0 | 5 | 0 | 4 (Note: Appearance(s) in UEFA Europa League) | 0 | — | | 40 | 0 |
| LASK | 2019–20 | Austrian Bundesliga | 32 | 0 | 4 | 0 | 14 (Note: Ten appearances in UEFA Europa League, four appearances in UEFA Champions League) | 0 | — | | 50 | 0 |
| LASK | 2020–21 | Austrian Bundesliga | 30 | 0 | 6 | 0 | 8 | 0 | — | | 44 | 0 |
| LASK | 2021–22 | Austrian Bundesliga | 33 | 0 | 3 | 0 | 11 (Note: Appearance(s) in UEFA Europa Conference League) | 0 | — | | 47 | 0 |
| LASK | 2022–23 | Austrian Bundesliga | 24 | 0 | 5 | 0 | 0 | 0 | — | | 30 | 0 |
| LASK | Total | | 152 | 0 | 20 | 0 | 40 | 0 | — | | 212 | 0 |
| Red Bull Salzburg | 2023–24 | Austrian Bundesliga | 28 | 0 | 3 | 0 | 6 (Note: Appearance(s) in UEFA Champions League) | 0 | 0 | 0 | 37 | 0 |
| Red Bull Salzburg | 2024–25 | Austrian Bundesliga | 21 | 0 | 2 | 0 | 4 | 0 | 0 | 0 | 27 | 0 |
| Red Bull Salzburg | 2025–26 | Austrian Bundesliga | 31 | 0 | 5 | 0 | 11 (Note: Four appearances in UEFA Champions League, seven appearances in UEFA Europa League) | 0 | — | | 47 | 0 |
| Red Bull Salzburg | Total | | 80 | 0 | 10 | 0 | 21 | 0 | 0 | 0 | 111 | 0 |
| Werder Bremen | 2026–27 | Bundesliga | 0 | 0 | 1 | 0 | — | | 0 | 0 | 1 | 0 |
| Career total | | | 265 | 0 | 33 | 0 | 61 | 0 | 0 | 0 | 359 | 0 |

=== International ===
As of match played 14 November 2026

Appearances and goals by national team and year
| National team | Year | Apps | Goals |
|---|---|---|---|
| Austria | 2019 | 1 | 0 |
| Austria | 2020 | 2 | 0 |
| Austria | 2021 | 3 | 0 |
| Austria | 2022 | 1 | 0 |
| Austria | 2023 | 7 | 0 |
| Austria | 2024 | 3 | 0 |
| Austria | 2025 | 7 | 0 |
| Austria | 2026 | 9 | 0 |
| Total | | 33 | 0 |

== Honours ==
Individual

- Austrian Bundesliga Team of the Year: 2019–20, 2023–24
