= Oumar Solet =

Ivorian footballer (born 2000)

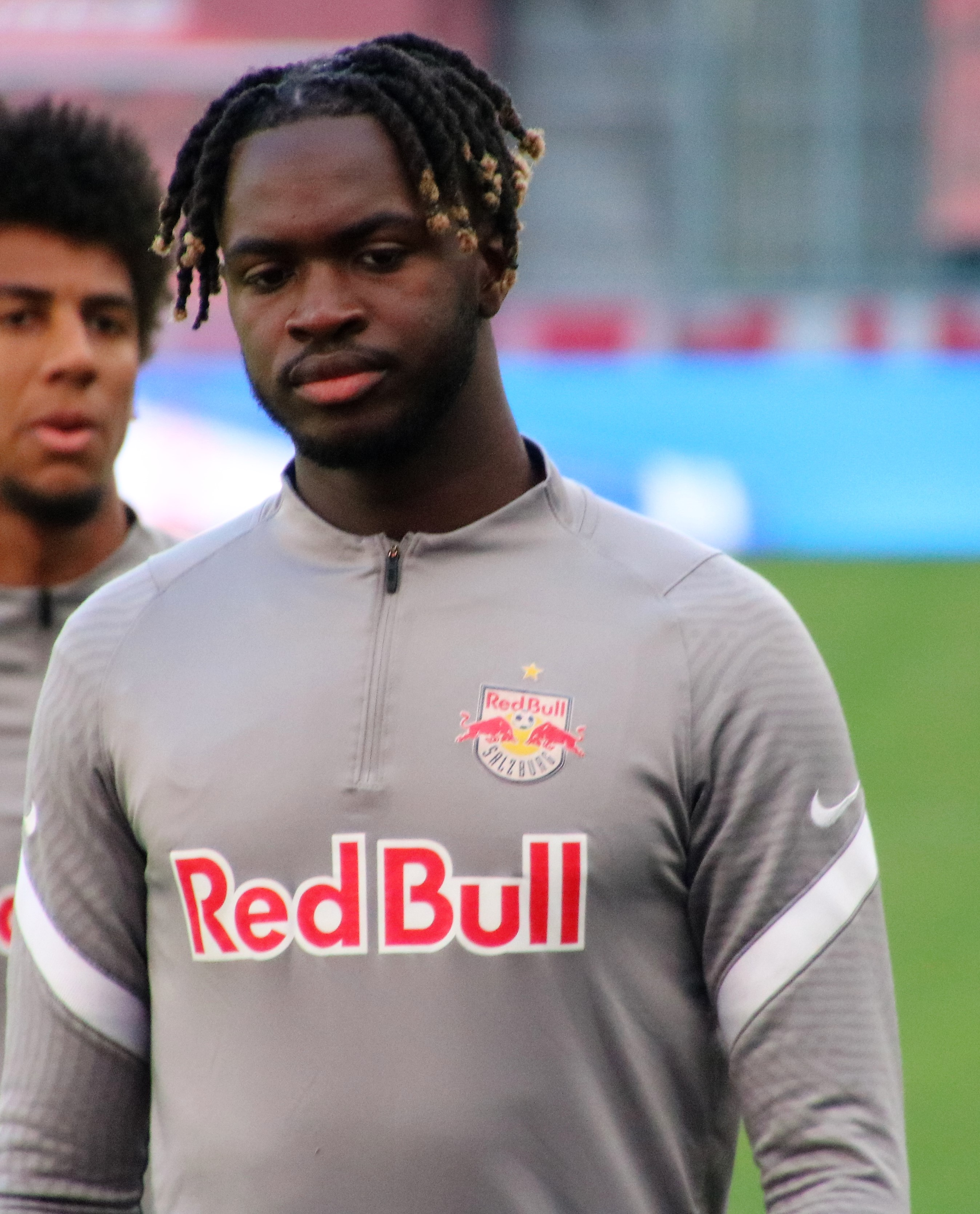
- Solet with Red Bull Salzburg in 2021

Personal information
- Full name: Oumar Mickaël Solet Bomawoko
- Date of birth: 7 February 2000 (age 26)
- Place of birth: Melun, France
- Height: 1.92 m (6 ft 4 in)
- Position: Centre-back

Team information
- Current team: Udinese
- Number: 28

Youth career
- 2006–2009: FC Dammarie-les-Lys
- 2009–2012: Créteil
- 2012–2015: US Villejuif
- 2015–2017: Laval

Senior career*
Years	Team	Apps	(Gls)
2016–2017	Laval B	7	(0)
2017–2018	Laval	12	(0)
2018	→ Lyon B (loan)	11	(0)
2018–2020	Lyon B	27	(1)
2018–2020	Lyon	2	(0)
2020–2024	Red Bull Salzburg	78	(3)
2025–	Udinese	54	(4)

International career
2016	France U17	1	(0)
2017–2018	France U18	7	(0)
2018–2019	France U19	12	(1)
2019	France U20	2	(0)
2026–	Ivory Coast	1	(0)
- * Club domestic league appearances and goals as of 25 May 2026

Oumar Mickaël Solet Bomawoko (born 7 February 2000) is a professional footballer who plays as a centre-back for Serie A club Udinese. Born in France, he plays for the Ivory Coast national team.

== Club career ==
=== Laval ===
Solet developed through the Laval academy. He made his debut on 4 August 2017 in the Championnat National against US Concarneau. He played the full 90 minutes in a 1–0 away victory.

=== Lyon ===
On 22 January 2018, Solet joined Lyon on loan from Laval for €550,000, with an option to make the move permanent for an additional €550,000, up to €2 million in bonuses and 20% of the profits from his next sale.

=== RB Salzburg ===
On 17 July 2020, Solet joined Red Bull Salzburg for €4.5 million, up to €4 million in bonuses, and 15% of any future sale. On 14 September 2024, his contract with the club was terminated by mutual agreement.

=== Udinese ===
On 1 October 2024, Solet signed a pre-contract with Italian club Udinese that stated he would join the club on 1 January 2025. On 4 January, Solet made his debut for the club in a 0–0 draw away to Hellas Verona.

== International career ==
Solet was born in France and is of Ivorian and Central African descent. He was part of the France U-17 FIFA World Cup squad in 2017.

Soler was one of the players who were called up with the Ivory Coast national team by head coach Hervé Renard for the 2027 Africa Cup of Nations qualification matches against Gambia in November 2026.

== Career statistics ==
As of match played 2 May 2026

Appearances and goals by club, season and competition
Club	Season	League			National Cup		League Cup		Europe		Other		Total	
Club	Season	Division	Apps	Goals	Apps	Goals	Apps	Goals	Apps	Goals	Apps	Goals	Apps	Goals
Laval	2017–18	National	12	0	2	0	1	0	—		—		15	0
Lyon II	2017–18	National 2	11	0	—		—		—		—		11	0
Lyon II	2018–19	National 2	18	0	—		—		—		—		18	0
Lyon II	2019–20	National 2	9	1	—		—		—		—		9	1
Lyon II	Total		38	1	—		—		—		—		38	1
Lyon	2018–19	Ligue 1	1	0	1	0	1	0	0	0	—		3	0
Lyon	2019–20	Ligue 1	1	0	0	0	0	0	0	0	—		1	0
Lyon	Total		2	0	1	0	1	0	0	0	—		4	0
Red Bull Salzburg	2020–21	Austrian Bundesliga	10	0	0	0	—		2 (Note: Appearance(s) in UEFA Europa League)	0	—		12	0
Red Bull Salzburg	2021–22	Austrian Bundesliga	22	1	4	0	—		7 (Note: Appearance(s) in UEFA Champions League)	0	—		33	1
Red Bull Salzburg	2022–23	Austrian Bundesliga	25	1	2	0	—		6 (Note: Four appearances in UEFA Champions League, two appearances in UEFA Europa League)	0	—		33	1
Red Bull Salzburg	2023–24	Austrian Bundesliga	21	1	3	1	—		3	0	—		27	2
Red Bull Salzburg	Total		78	3	9	1	—		18	0	—		105	4
Udinese	2024–25	Serie A	19	1	—		—		—		—		19	1
Udinese	2025–26	Serie A	32	3	3	0	—		—		—		35	3
Udinese	Total		51	4	3	0	—		—		—		54	4
Career total			181	8	15	1	2	0	18	0	0	0	221	9

== Honours ==
Red Bull Salzburg

- Austrian Bundesliga: 2020–21, 2021–22, 2022–23
- Austrian Cup: 2020–21, 2021–22

Individual

- UEFA European Under-19 Championship Team of the Tournament: 2019

== Personal life ==
His younger brother Isaac Solet is also a footballer playing for CSKA Sofia and the Central African Republic national team.
