= Mads Bidstrup =

Danish footballer (born 2001)

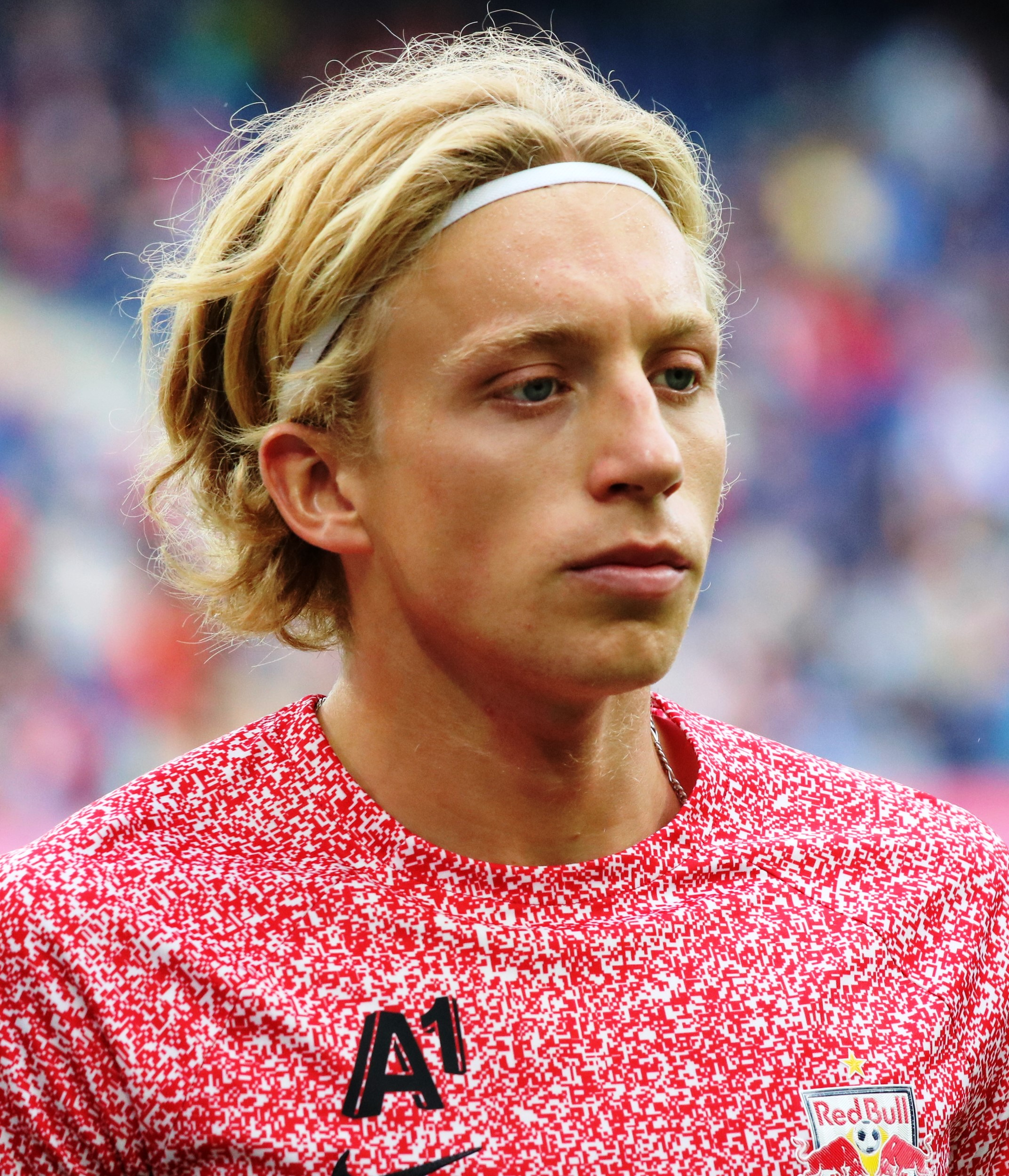
- Bidstrup playing for Red Bull Salzburg in 2023.

Personal information
- Full name: Mads Bidstrup
- Date of birth: 25 February 2001 (age 25)
- Place of birth: Køge, Denmark
- Height: 1.75 m (5 ft 9 in)
- Position: Midfielder

Team information
- Current team: Lyon
- Number: 2

Youth career
- Herfølge
- –2013: Brøndby
- 2013–2018: Copenhagen
- 2018–2020: RB Leipzig

Senior career*
Years	Team	Apps	(Gls)
2020–2023	Brentford	8	(0)
2022	→ Nordsjælland (loan)	13	(0)
2022–2023	→ Nordsjælland (loan)	30	(0)
2023–2026	Red Bull Salzburg	80	(3)
2026–	Lyon	9	(0)

International career^{‡}
2016–2017	Denmark U16	7	(0)
2017	Denmark U17	7	(1)
2018	Denmark U18	1	(0)
2018–2019	Denmark U19	7	(0)
2021–2022	Denmark U21	10	(0)
2026–	Denmark	1	(0)
- * Club domestic league appearances and goals as of 22:30, 8 November 2026 (UTC) ‡ National team caps and goals as of 22:41, 24 September 2026 (UTC)

Mads Bidstrup (Danish pronunciation: [ˈmas ˈpiðs.tʁɔp]; born 25 February 2001) is a Danish professional footballer who plays as a midfielder for Ligue 1 club Lyon and the Denmark national team.

Bidstrup is a product of the Copenhagen academy and began his senior career in England with Brentford in 2020. He played the majority of his three years with the club away on loan with Nordsjælland in his native Denmark. Bidstrup transferred to Austrian club Red Bull Salzburg in 2023. After making more than 100 appearances over three seasons and captaining the club, he transferred to French club Lyon in 2026.

== Club career ==
=== Early career ===
A midfielder, Bidstrup began his career in the youth systems at Herfølge, Brøndby and Copenhagen. In January 2018, he transferred to German club RB Leipzig for an initial 15 million kr fee. Bidstrup was a part of the RB Leipzig U19 team which reached the 2019 DFB-Pokal Junior Final and despite having three years remaining on his contract, he departed the club in July 2020.

=== Brentford ===
==== 2020–21 season ====
On 16 July 2020, Bidstrup joined the B team at English Championship club Brentford on a three-year contract, with the option of a further year, for an undisclosed fee. He was included in the first team group for its pre-season training camp at St George's Park, but he suffered a patella injury during the camp, which required surgery. After returning to fitness, Bidstrup made his B team debut in a match versus a Stevenage XI on 14 February 2021 and three days later, he won his maiden call into the first team squad for a league match versus West London rivals Queens Park Rangers. He remained an unused substitute during the 2–1 defeat and was thereafter a regular inclusion on the bench. Bidstrup made six late-season appearances, including a substitute cameo in the promotion-clinching 2–0 2021 Championship play-off final victory over Swansea City on 29 May. He was promoted into the first team squad in June 2021.

==== 2021–2023 and Nordsjælland loans ====
Bidstrup was a frequent inclusion on the substitutes' bench for Premier League matches during the first half of the 2021–22 season. He predominantly featured in cup competitions and his starting performance in a 4–1 FA Cup third round win over Port Vale on 8 January 2022 was recognised with a nomination for a place in the Team of the Round. Three weeks later and in need of "a run of consecutive matches in order to progress to the next level", Bidstrup joined Danish Superliga club Nordsjælland on loan until the end of the 2021–22 season. He made 13 appearances and signed a new two-year contract (with a two-year option) during the 2022 off-season.

Bidstrup rejoined Nordsjælland on loan for the 2022–23 season and his 34 appearances were recognised with the club's Player of the Year award. Bidstrup departed Brentford in July 2023 and he made 14 appearances during his three seasons at the Community Stadium.

=== Red Bull Salzburg ===
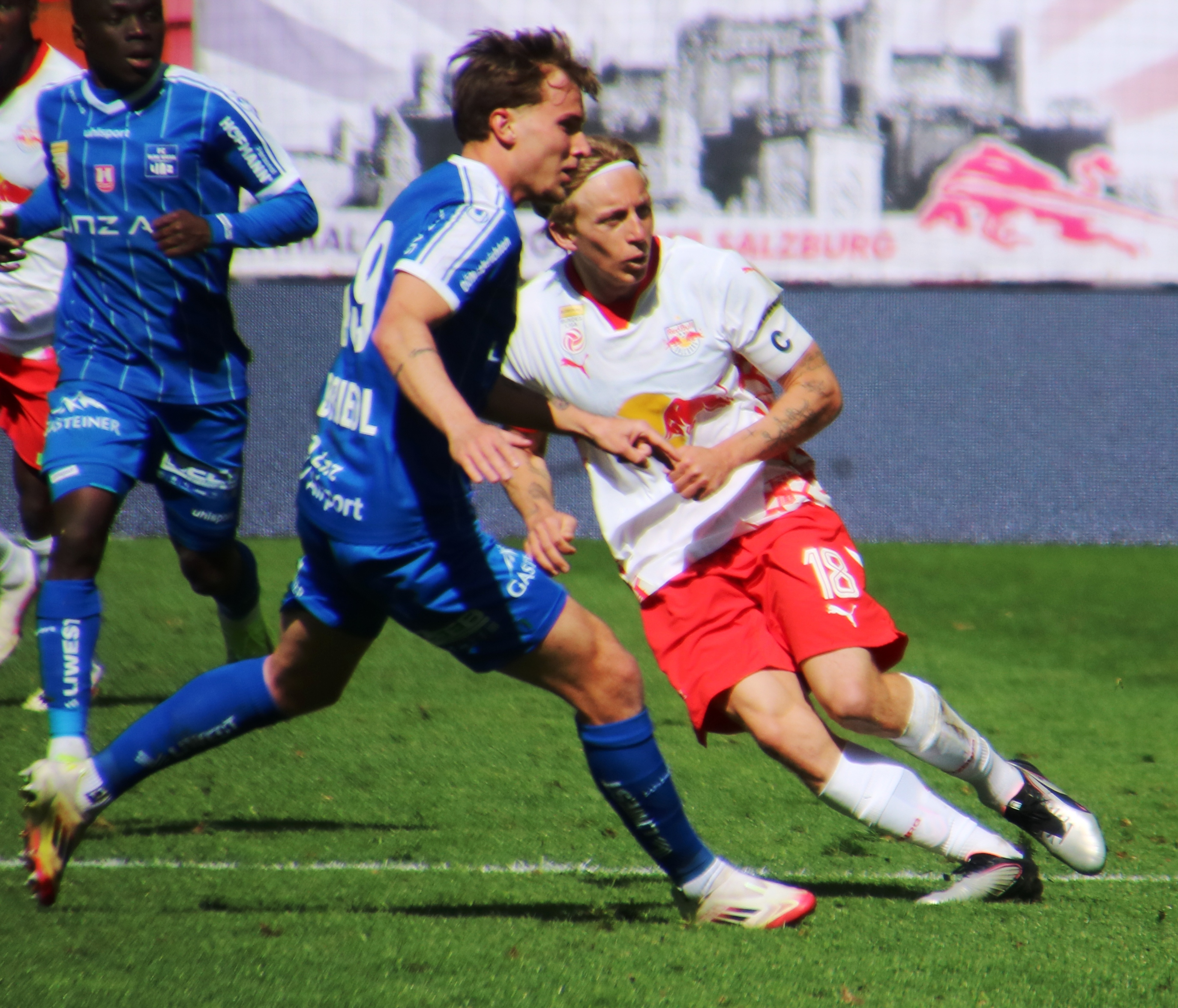
Bidstrup playing for Red Bull Salzburg in April 2025

On 16 July 2023, Bidstrup transferred to Austrian Bundesliga club Red Bull Salzburg and signed a five-year contract for an undisclosed fee. He made 116 appearances and scored four goals over the course of the 2023–24, 2024–25 and 2025–26 seasons and was announced as club captain on 2 February 2025. Bidstrup departed the club in July 2026.

=== Lyon ===
On 2 July 2026, Bidstrup transferred to French Ligue 1 club Lyon and signed a five-year contract for a €10.5 million fee, rising to €13.5 million with add-ons.

== International career ==
Bidstrup won 31 caps and scored one goal for Denmark between U16 and U21 level. He was called into the U20 squad for two friendlies in June 2021, but withdrew from the squad. Bidstrup won his maiden call-up to the senior team for a pair of Nations League fixtures in October 2024 and he remained an unused substitute in both matches.

He was one of the players who were called-up with the Denmark national team by head coach Brian Riemer for the UEFA Nations League matches against Norway, Wales (home and away) and Portugal on 24, 27 September and 1, 4 October 2026.

== Style of play ==
Brentford manager Thomas Frank stated that Bidstrup "can play as a number six or a number eight. His pressing ability is excellent in terms of the area that he is able to cover on the pitch and he also has the pace on the half turn with the ball to move it forward".

== Personal life ==
Bidstrup attended Niels Brock Copenhagen Business College. He is the older brother of Hjalte Bidstrup, who is also a professional footballer.

== Career statistics ==
=== Club ===
As of match played 8 November 2026

Appearances and goals by club, season and competition
Club	Season	League			National cup (Note: Includes FA Cup, Danish Cup, Austrian Cup)		League cup (Note: Includes EFL Cup)		Europe		Other		Total	
Club	Season	Division	Apps	Goals	Apps	Goals	Apps	Goals	Apps	Goals	Apps	Goals	Apps	Goals
Brentford	2020–21	Championship	4	0	0	0	0	0	―		2 (Note: Appearances in Championship play-offs)	0	6	0
Brentford	2021–22	Premier League	4	0	1	0	3	0	―		―		8	0
Brentford	Total		8	0	1	0	3	0	―		2	0	14	0
Nordsjælland (loan)	2021–22	Danish Superliga	13	0	―		―		―		―		13	0
Nordsjælland (loan)	2022–23	Danish Superliga	30	0	4	0	―		―		―		34	0
Nordsjælland (loan)	Total		43	0	4	0	―		―		―		57	0
Red Bull Salzburg	2023–24	Austrian Bundesliga	25	2	5	0	―		6 (Note: Appearances in UEFA Champions League)	0	―		36	2
Red Bull Salzburg	2024–25	Austrian Bundesliga	30	1	3	0	―		9	1	2 (Note: Appearances in FIFA Club World Cup)	0	44	2
Red Bull Salzburg	2025–26	Austrian Bundesliga	25	0	2	0	—		9 (Note: Four appearances in UEFA Champions League, five appearances in UEFA Europa League)	0	—		36	0
Red Bull Salzburg	Total		80	3	10	0	―		24	1	2	0	116	4
Lyon	2026–27	Ligue 1	9	0	0	0	—		6 (Note: Two appearances in UEFA Champions League, four appearances in UEFA Europa League)	0	—		15	0
Career total			140	3	15	0	3	0	30	1	4	0	192	4

=== International ===
As of match played 24 September 2026

Appearances and goals by national team and year
National team	Year	Apps	Goals
Denmark	2026	1	0
Total		1	0

== Honours ==
Brentford

- EFL Championship play-offs: 2021

Individual

- Nordsjælland Player of the Year: 2022–23
- Red Bull Salzburg Player of the Month: March 2024, October 2024
