= Karim Konaté =

Ivorian footballer

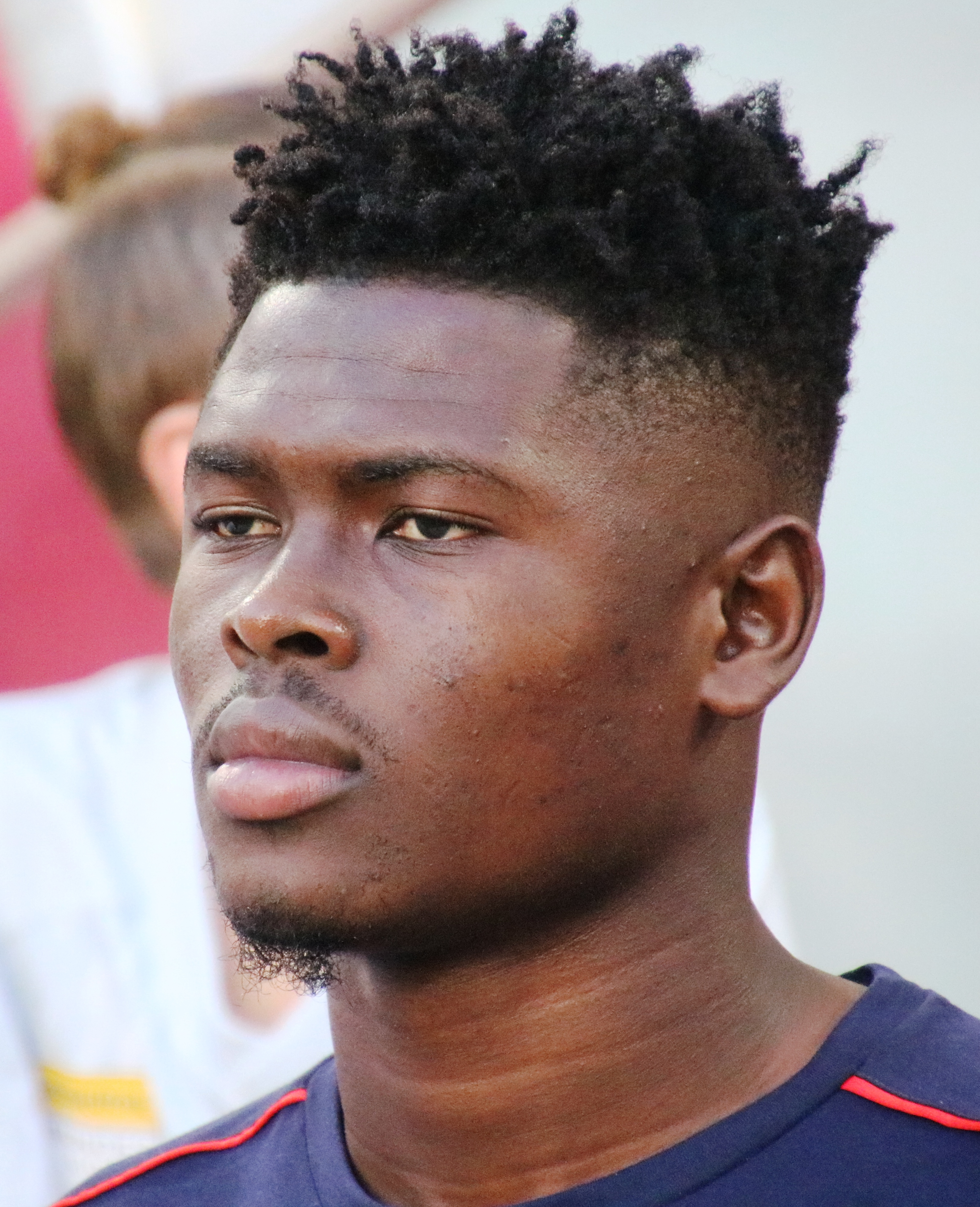
- Konaté with Red Bull Salzburg in 2024

Personal information
- Date of birth: 21 March 2004 (age 22)
- Place of birth: Ouragahio, Ivory Coast
- Height: 1.78 m (5 ft 10 in)
- Position: Forward

Team information
- Current team: Red Bull Salzburg
- Number: 19

Youth career
- ASEC Mimosas

Senior career*
Years	Team	Apps	(Gls)
2020–2022	ASEC Mimosas	29	(20)
2022–	Red Bull Salzburg	71	(36)
2022–2023	→ FC Liefering (loan)	18	(15)

International career^{‡}
2023–	Ivory Coast U23	4	(3)
2021–	Ivory Coast	19	(2)
Medal record
Representing Ivory Coast
Men's football
Africa Cup of Nations
Winner	2023 Ivory Coast
- * Club domestic league appearances and goals as of 25 October 2026 ‡ National team caps and goals as of 19 November 2024

Karim Konaté (born 21 March 2004) is an Ivorian professional footballer who plays as a forward for Austrian Bundesliga club Red Bull Salzburg and the Ivory Coast national team.

== Club career ==
Konaté began his professional career at ASEC Mimosas. He broke into the first team during the 2020–21 season, playing a key role in helping the club win the Ivorian Ligue 1 title that year.

On 14 June 2022, Konaté signed a five-year contract with Red Bull Salzburg for a reported transfer fee of €3.5 million. Shortly after his arrival, he was loaned to FC Liefering, Salzburg's partner club, to gain experience.

In January 2023, he returned to Red Bull Salzburg and made his first-team debut on 19 February 2023 in an Austrian Bundesliga match against WSG Tirol. Coming on as a substitute for Junior Adamu, Konaté scored his first goal for the club, contributing to a 3–1 away victory.

On 23 July 2023, Konaté scored his first brace for Salzburg in an Austrian Cup match against SC Union Ardagger. He started the match and helped his team to a 6–0 win.

Konaté registered his first hat-trick for the club on 12 May 2024, in a league match against TSV Hartberg. Starting the game, he scored three goals in a 5–1 victory.

== International career ==
Konaté debuted with the Ivory Coast national team in a 0–0 2022 FIFA World Cup qualification tie with Mozambique on 3 March 2021. He was called up to the Ivory Coast U23s in March 2023.

On 28 December 2023, he was selected from the list of 27 Ivorian players selected by Jean-Louis Gasset to compete in the 2023 Africa Cup of Nations.

== Career statistics ==
=== Club ===
As of match played 28 October 2026

Appearances and goals by club, season and competition
Club	Season	League			National cup (Note: Includes Austrian Cup)		Continental		Total	
Club	Season	Division	Apps	Goals	Apps	Goals	Apps	Goals	Apps	Goals
ASEC Mimosas	2021–22	Ivorian Ligue 1	12	12	0	0	4 (Note: Appearances in CAF Champions League)	0	16	12
ASEC Mimosas	2022–23	Ivorian Ligue 1	17	8	0	0	8 (Note: Appearances in CAF Confederation Cup)	0	25	8
ASEC Mimosas	Total		29	20	0	0	12	0	41	20
Red Bull Salzburg	2022–23	Austrian Bundesliga	9	3	1	2	0	0	10	5
Red Bull Salzburg	2023–24	Austrian Bundesliga	29	20	4	2	5 (Note: Appearances in UEFA Champions League)	0	38	22
Red Bull Salzburg	2024–25	Austrian Bundesliga	9	2	3	4	5	2	17	8
Red Bull Salzburg	2025–26	Austrian Bundesliga	16	7	2	1	4 (Note: Appearances in UEFA Europa League)	0	22	8
Red Bull Salzburg	2026–27	Austrian Bundesliga	8	4	3	1	5	2	16	7
Red Bull Salzburg	Total		71	36	13	10	19	4	103	50
FC Liefering (loan)	2022–23	Austrian 2. Liga	18	15	—		—		18	15
Career total			118	71	13	10	31	4	162	85

=== International ===
As of match played 19 November 2024

Appearances and goals by national team and year
National team	Year	Apps	Goals
Ivory Coast	2021	2	0
Ivory Coast	2022	5	0
Ivory Coast	2023	4	2
Ivory Coast	2024	8	0
Total		19	2

Scores and results list Ivory Coast's goal tally first, score column indicates score after each Konaté goal.

List of international goals scored by Karim Konaté
No.	Date	Venue	Opponent	Score	Result	Competition	Ref.
1	17 November 2023	Alassane Ouattara Stadium, Abidjan, Ivory Coast	Seychelles	4–0	9–0	2026 FIFA World Cup qualification	
2	17 November 2023	Alassane Ouattara Stadium, Abidjan, Ivory Coast	Seychelles	9–0	9–0	2026 FIFA World Cup qualification	

== Honours ==
ASEC Mimosas

- Ligue 1: 2020–21

FC Red Bull Salzburg

- Austrian Bundesliga: 2022–23

Ivory Coast

- Africa Cup of Nations: 2023

Individual

- Austrian Bundesliga top scorer: 2023–24
