= Samson Baidoo =

Austrian footballer (born 2004)

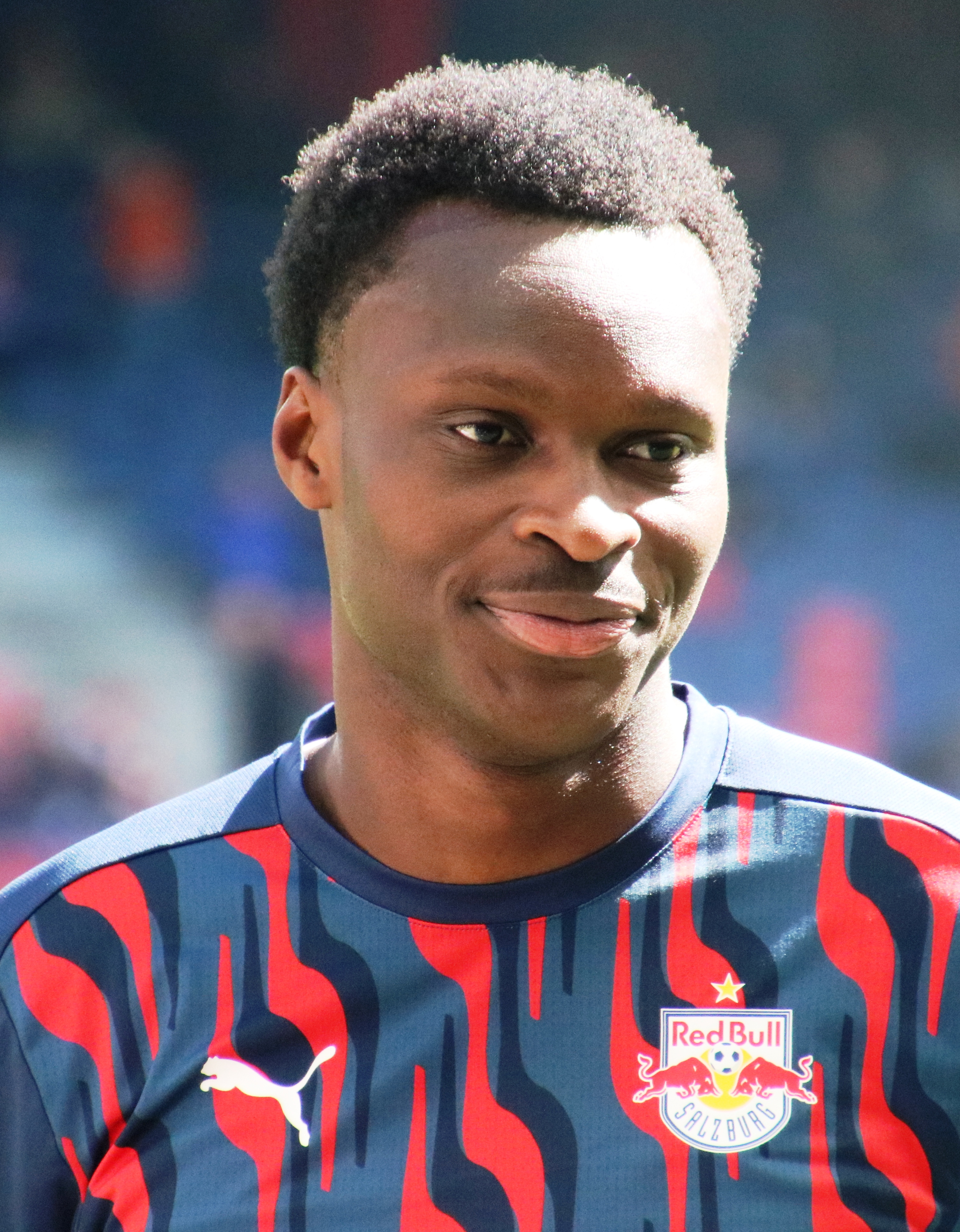
- Baidoo with Red Bull Salzburg in 2025

Personal information
- Date of birth: 31 March 2004 (age 22)
- Place of birth: Graz, Austria
- Height: 1.86 m (6 ft 1 in)
- Position: Defender

Team information
- Current team: Lens
- Number: 6

Youth career
- 2012–2013: Post SV Graz
- 2013–2018: Grazer AK
- 2018: FC Liefering
- 2018–2021: Red Bull Salzburg

Senior career*
Years	Team	Apps	(Gls)
2021–2022	FC Liefering	46	(1)
2022–2025	Red Bull Salzburg	50	(2)
2025–	Lens	26	(2)

International career^{‡}
2019	Austria U15	9	(0)
2019	Austria U16	6	(0)
2020	Austria U17	1	(0)
2021	Austria U18	7	(1)
2023	Austria	1	(0)
- * Club domestic league appearances and goals as of 30 October 2026 ‡ National team caps and goals as of 13 October 2023

Samson Baidoo (born 31 March 2004) is an Austrian professional footballer who plays as a defender for Ligue 1 club Lens.

== Club career ==
On 17 July 2025, Baidoo signed a five-year contract with Ligue 1 club Lens in France.

== International career ==
Born in Austria, Baidoo is of Ghanaian descent; he has represented the former country at youth international level.

In October 2023, he received his first call-up to the Austrian senior national team for two UEFA Euro 2024 qualifying matches against Belgium and Azerbaijan.

== Career statistics ==
=== Club ===
As of match played 30 October 2026.

Appearances and goals by club, season and competition
Club	Season	League			Cup		Continental		Other		Total	
Club	Season	Division	Apps	Goals	Apps	Goals	Apps	Goals	Apps	Goals	Apps	Goals
FC Liefering	2021–22	2. Liga	25	0	0	0	–		–		25	0
FC Liefering	2022–23	2. Liga	21	1	0	0	–		–		21	1
FC Liefering	Total		46	1	0	0	–		–		46	1
Red Bull Salzburg	2022–23	Austrian Bundesliga	4	0	1	0	0	0	–		5	0
Red Bull Salzburg	2023–24	Austrian Bundesliga	17	2	1	0	5 (Note: Appearances in UEFA Champions League)	0	0	0	23	2
Red Bull Salzburg	2024–25	Austrian Bundesliga	29	0	2	0	11	0	1 (Note: Appearance in FIFA Club World Cup)	0	43	0
Red Bull Salzburg	Total		50	2	4	0	16	0	1	0	71	2
Lens	2025–26	Ligue 1	22	2	3	0	—		—		25	2
Lens	2026–27	Ligue 1	4	0	0	0	2	0	—		6	0
Lens	Total		26	2	3	0	2	0	—		31	2
Career total			122	5	7	0	18	0	1	0	148	5

=== International ===
As of match played 13 October 2023

Appearances and goals by national team and year
National team	Year	Apps	Goals
Austria	2023	1	0
Total		1	0

== Honours ==
Red Bull Salzburg

- Austrian Bundesliga: 2022–23
