= Kofi Schulz =

Ghanaian-German footballer (born 1989)

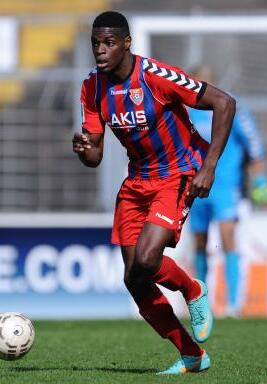
- Schulz in 2014

Personal information
- Full name: Kofi Yeboah Schulz
- Date of birth: 21 July 1989 (age 37)
- Place of birth: Berlin, Germany
- Height: 1.88 m (6 ft 2 in)
- Position: Left-back

Team information
- Current team: Mes Rafsanjan
- Number: 44

Youth career
- –1999: Rapide Wedding
- 1999–2004: Hertha BSC
- 2004–2008: Milton Keynes Dons

Senior career*
Years	Team	Apps	(Gls)
2008–2011	Kempston Rovers		
2011–2013	SV Babelsberg 03	6	(0)
2014–2015	KFC Uerdingen 05	49	(7)
2015–2016	Biel-Bienne	24	(0)
2016–2017	St. Gallen	20	(0)
2017–2018	Winterthur	25	(4)
2018–2019	Apollon Smyrnis	0	(0)
2019–2020	SKU Amstetten	11	(2)
2020–2021	SKN St. Pölten	41	(4)
2022–2024	WSG Tirol	73	(4)
2024–	Mes Rafsanjan	2	(0)
- * Club domestic league appearances and goals as of 26 May 2024

Kofi Yeboah Schulz (born 21 July 1989) is a German professional footballer who plays as a left-back club Mes Rafsanjan.

== Early life ==
Kofi Yeboah Schulz was born in Berlin, Germany. He has one older brother, Kwame Schulz (b. 1987) and one younger brother, Kwabenaboys Schulz (b. 1998), who also plays football for Regionalliga Nordost club FC Viktoria 1889 Berlin. Born in Germany, Schulz is of Ghanaian descent.

== Career ==
Schulz began his career in Rapide Wedding's youth team. In Sommer 1999 he moved to Hertha BSC's youth team. In June 2004 he signed for Milton Keynes Dons and stayed there for four seasons before signing for AFC Kempston Rovers.

On 16 July 2011, he left England and moved back to Germany, where he signed a two-year contract with 3. Liga club SV Babelsberg 03. After the season 2012–13 he left Babelsberg.

He signed for Regionalliga West club KFC Uerdingen 05 in January 2004. After a successful league campaign, he signed for Swiss Challenge League club FC Biel-Bienne in Switzerland. Schulz became widely known for his pace and gained national attention for is mesmerising solo-assist against FC Aarau. He signed for Super League club FC St. Gallen 1879 in January 2016 but remained at FC Biel-Bienne until the end of the season. In October 2017 he signed for Swiss Challenge League club FC Winterthur.

After four goals and three assists in the Swiss Challenge League, he signed for Greek Super League club Apollon Smyrnis. in August 2019 he signed for Austrian Football Second League club SKU Amstetten. He left the club on 6 February 2020, when he signed with SKN St. Pölten until the end of the season.

On 14 December 2021, Schulz signed with WSG Tirol.
