= Adam Stejskal =

Czech footballer (born 2002)

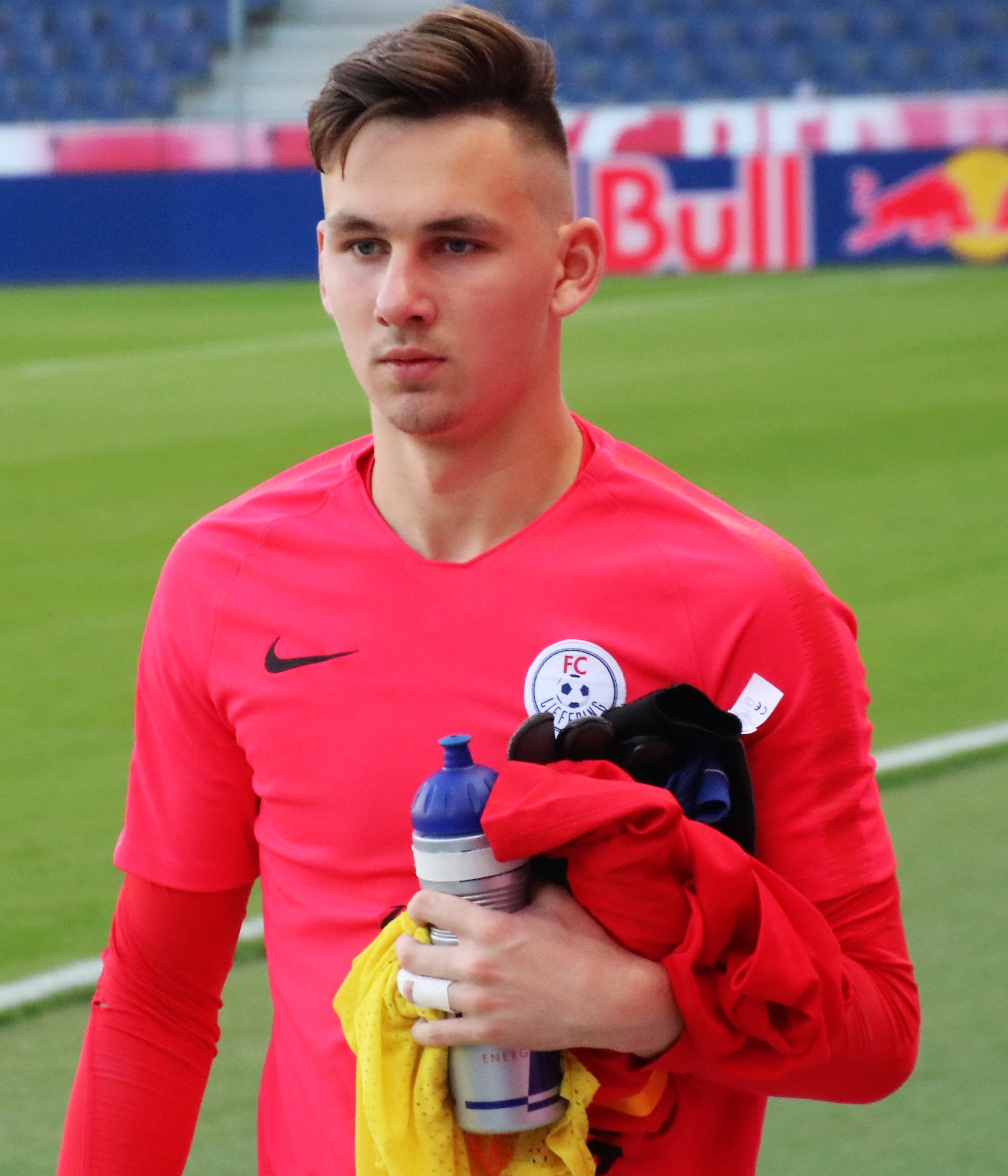

Personal information
- Date of birth: 23 August 2002 (age 24)
- Place of birth: Brno, Czech Republic
- Height: 1.89 m (6 ft 2 in)
- Position: Goalkeeper

Team information
- Current team: Sturm Graz

Youth career
- Red Bull Salzburg

Senior career*
Years	Team	Apps	(Gls)
2020–2022	FC Liefering	36	(0)
2022–2023	Red Bull Salzburg	0	(0)
2023–2026	WSG Tirol	95	(0)
2026–	Sturm Graz	0	(0)

International career
2019–	Czech Republic U17	5	(0)
- * Club domestic league appearances and goals as of 10 June 2026

Adam Stejskal (born 23 August 2002) is a Czech professional footballer who plays as a goalkeeper for Austrian Bundesliga club Sturm Graz.

== Club career ==
Stejskal made his debut for 2. Liga side FC Liefering on 24 July 2020 against Juniors OÖ. He started as Liefering won 5–0.

== Career statistics ==
=== Club ===
As of match played 27 May 2021

Appearances and goals by club, season and competition
Club	Season	League			Cup		Continental		Total	
Club	Season	Division	Apps	Goals	Apps	Goals	Apps	Goals	Apps	Goals
FC Liefering	2019–20	2. Liga	2	0	—	—	—	—	2	0
FC Liefering	2020–21	2. Liga	17	0	—	—	—	—	17	0
Career total			19	0	0	0	0	0	19	0
