= 2026–27 TSV Hartberg season =

TSV Hartberg
2026–27 season
- Manager: Markus Schopp
- Stadium: Profertil Arena Hartberg
- Austrian Football Bundesliga: 5th
- Austrian Cup: Fourth round
- Top goalscorer: League: Marco Hoffmann (8); All: Marco Hoffmann (10)
- Highest home attendance: 5,085 (vs. SK Sturm Graz, 8 August 2026)
- Lowest home attendance: 2,390 (vs. SV Ried, 30 August 2026)
- Average home league attendance: 3,283
- Biggest win: 4–0 (vs. SK Vorwärts Steyr, 6 September 2026) (vs. Grazer AK, 30 October 2026)
- Biggest defeat: 2–0 (vs. SK Sturm Graz, 8 August 2026) (vs. FK Austria Wien, 16 August 2026); 3–1 (vs. Rapid Wien, 16 October 2026)
- All statistics correct as of 16 October 2026.

The 2026–27 season is the 81st season in the history of TSV Hartberg, and the club's ninth consecutive season in the Austrian Football Bundesliga. In addition to the domestic league, the team is scheduled to participate in the Austrian Cup.

== Transfers ==
=== In ===
Pos.	Player	Transferred from	Fee	Date	Source
FW	(Austria) Elias Havel	(Austria) LASK	€300k	1 July 2026	
DF	(Austria) Magnus Dalpiaz	(Germany) Bayern Munich	Loan	1 July 2026	
MF	(Austria) Florian Gerstl	(Austria) SR Donaufeld	Undisclosed	13 July 2026	
FW	(Argentina) Agustín Urrutia	(Slovenia) Ilirija	Undisclosed	17 July 2026	
FW	(Austria) Angelo Gattermayer	(Austria) Wolfsberger AC	Free	21 July 2026	
GK	(Hungary) Ármin Pécsi	(England) Liverpool	Loan	23 July 2026	
MF	(Croatia) Oliver Lukić	(Austria) Red Bull Salzburg	Loan	25 July 2026	
FW	(Germany) Chilohem Onuoha	(Portugal) Estrela Amadora	Loan	5 August 2026	
DF	(Austria) Simon Freund	(Austria) SV Seekirchen	Undisclosed	18 August 2026	
DF	(Germany) Manuel Pfeifer	(Germany) 1860 Munich	Free	25 August 2026	
FW	(Montenegro) Andrija Radulović	(Austria) Rapid Wien	Loan	3 September 2026	

=== Out ===
Pos.	Player	Transferred to	Fee	Date	Source
DF	(Austria) Jürgen Heil	(Austria) SK Sturm Graz	Free	23 May 2026	
MF	(Austria) Maximilian Fillafer	(Austria) First Vienna	Free	1 June 2026	
MF	(Austria) Julian Halwachs	(Austria) Sturm Graz II	Free	1 June 2026	
DF	(Austria) Damjan Kovacevic	(Germany) Eintracht Braunschweig	Free	3 June 2026	
GK	(Austria) Ammar Helac	(Austria) SK Sturm Graz	Free	13 June 2026	
GK	(Germany) Tom Ritzy Hülsmann	(France) Stade Reims	€2.5m	29 June 2026	
FW	(Croatia) Patrik Mijić	(Croatia) HNK Gorica	Free	1 July 2026	
DF	(Austria) Julian Gölles	(Austria) Bad Waltersdorf	Free	2 July 2026	
FW	(Austria) Elias Havel	(Italy) Genoa	€2m	10 July 2026	
DF	(Austria) Emmanuel Ojukwu	(Austria) SV Kapfenberg	Undisclosed	4 August 2026	

== Friendlies ==
27 June 2026 Friendly	TSV Hartberg (Austria)	3–1	(Austria) Admira Wacker
09:30	Dalpiaz 19'; Postl 76'; Korherr 83'	Report	Forst 67'

1 July 2026 Friendly	SC Weiz (Austria)	3–2	(Austria) TSV Hartberg
17:00	Pori 21', 42'; Fink 58'	Report	Hoffmann 14'; Postl 19'

4 July 2026 Friendly	TSV Hartberg (Austria)	1–1	(Hungary) Újpest
16:30	Drew 55'	Report	Ljujić 38'

8 July 2026 Friendly	TSV Hartberg (Austria)	2–0	(Czech Republic) Zbrojovka Brno
16:00	Hoffmann 23'; Komposch 75'	Report

11 July 2026 Friendly	TSV Hartberg (Austria)	3–0	(Czech Republic) Příbram
16:00	Postl 2', 35'; Korherr 51'	Report

11 July 2026 Friendly	TSV Hartberg (Austria)	Cancelled	(Slovenia) Mura
16:00		Report

18 July 2026 Friendly	TSV Hartberg (Austria)	2–0	(Austria) First Vienna
14:30	Schopp 2'; Hoffmann 44' (pen.)	Report

18 July 2026 Friendly	TSV Hartberg (Austria)	0–2	(Austria) ASK Voitsberg
16:30		Report	Stevanović 37'; Krienzer 90+1'

== Competitions ==
=== Overall record ===
Competition	First match	Last match	Starting round	Record							
Competition	First match	Last match	Starting round	Pld	W	D	L	GF	GA	GD	Win %
Austrian Football Bundesliga	1 August 2026		Matchday 1	11	5	2	4	20	19	+1	45.45
Austrian Cup	26 July 2026		First round	3	2	1	0	8	2	+6	66.67
Total				14	7	3	4	28	21	+7	50.00

Last updated: 30 October 2026
Source: Soccerway

=== Austrian Football Bundesliga ===
==== League table ====
Pos	Team	Pld	W	D	L	GF	GA	GD	Pts	Qualification
2	Red Bull Salzburg	12	9	3	0	33	9	+24	30	Qualification for the Championship round
3	LASK	12	8	1	3	30	15	+15	25	Qualification for the Championship round
4	TSV Hartberg	12	6	2	4	23	19	+4	20	Qualification for the Championship round
5	Sturm Graz	12	5	4	3	22	17	+5	19	Qualification for the Championship round
6	SV Ried	12	4	4	4	21	22	−1	16	Qualification for the Championship round

Updated to match(es) played on 8 November 2026. Source: Austrian Football Bundesliga
Rules for classification: 1) Points; 2) Head-to-head record; 3) Goal difference; 4) Goals scored; 5) Matches won; 6) Away matches won; 7) Away goals scored.

==== Results summary ====
Overall								Home						Away					
Pld	W	D	L	GF	GA	GD	Pts	W	D	L	GF	GA	GD	W	D	L	GF	GA	GD
11	5	2	4	20	19	+1	17	3	1	2	11	12	−1	2	1	2	9	7	+2

Last updated: 30 October 2026.
Source: ADMIRAL Bundesliga

==== Results by round ====
Round	1	2	3	4	5	6	7	8	9	10	11
Ground	A	H	H	A	H	A	H	H	A	H	A
Result	L	L	L	W	W	D	D	W	L	W	W
Position	9	11	12	9	5	6	6	5	7	6	5

Updated to match(es) played on 30 October 2026. Source: ADMIRAL Bundesliga
A = Away; H = Home; W = Win; D = Draw; L = Loss

==== Matches ====
1 August 2026 1	Red Bull Salzburg	1–0	TSV Hartberg	Wals-Siezenheim
19:30	Konaté 89'	Report		Stadium: Red Bull Arena; Attendance: 7,735; Referee: Alain Sadikovski

8 August 2026 2	TSV Hartberg	0–2	SK Sturm Graz	Hartberg
19:30	Schopp (yellow card) 37' (red card) 60'	Report	Weiper 70', 81'; Vallçi (yellow card) 90+4'	Stadium: Profertil Arena Hartberg; Attendance: 5,085; Referee: Julian Weinberger

16 August 2026 3	TSV Hartberg	0–2	FK Austria Wien	Hartberg
17:00	Gattermayer (yellow card) 14'; Coulibaly (yellow card) 45+1'	Report	Nnodim 33'; Boateng (yellow card) 60'; Hettwer 76'	Stadium: Profertil Arena Hartberg; Attendance: 3,620; Referee: Emil Ristoskov

22 August 2026 4	SCR Altach	1–2	TSV Hartberg	Altach
17:00	Diawara 53'	Report	Gattermayer 16', (yellow card) 87'; Wilfinger (yellow card) 85'; Feldhofer (yellow card) 86'; Markuš 90+3'	Stadium: Stadion Schnabelholz; Attendance: 5,132; Referee: Walter Altmann

30 August 2026 5	TSV Hartberg	3–2	SV Ried	Hartberg
17:00	Hoffmann 6' (pen.), 38'; Diarra (yellow card) 12'; Karner 71'	Report	Malicsek (yellow card) 4'; Chukwudi 11'; Sissoko (yellow card) 34'; Eghosa Aisowieren 64'	Stadium: Profertil Arena Hartberg; Attendance: 2,390; Referee: Arnes Talic

13 September 2026 6	WSG Tirol	2–2	TSV Hartberg	Innsbruck
14:30	Hinterseer 72'; Satin 90+3' (pen.)	Report	Lukić 14'; Hoffmann 44'	Stadium: Tivoli Stadion Tirol; Attendance: 1,642; Referee: Achim Untergasser

20 September 2026 7	TSV Hartberg	3–3	LASK	Hartberg
14:30	Schopp (yellow card) 21'; Radulović 46', 72', (yellow card) 77'; Kainz (yellow card) 68'; Drew 77'; Wilfinger (yellow card) 90+2'	Report	Horvath 7'; Lang 30'; Andrade 58'	Stadium: Profertil Arena Hartberg; Attendance: 3,096; Referee: Safak Barmaksiz

11 October 2026 8	TSV Hartberg	4–3	Austria Lustenau	Hartberg
14:30	Hoffmann 8', 55', 86'; Feldhofer 60'		Gashi 11'; Weixelbraun 43', 90+3'; Grabher (yellow card) 72'	Stadium: Profertil Arena Hartberg; Attendance: 3,047; Referee: Markus Greinecker

16 October 2026 9	SK Rapid	3–1	TSV Hartberg	Vienna
19:30	Dahl 5', 45+1'; Raux-Yao (yellow card) 26'; Horn 81'		Dalpiaz 49'; Schopp (yellow card) 57'; Karner (yellow card) 90+2'	Stadium: Allianz Stadion; Attendance: 20,797; Referee: Daniel Pfister

24 October 2026 10	TSV Hartberg	1–0	Wolfsberger AC	Hartberg
17:00	Schopp 85'	Report		Stadium: Profertil Arena Hartberg; Attendance: 2,462; Referee: Josef Spurny

30 October 2026 11	Grazer AK	0–4	TSV Hartberg	Graz
19:30	Hofleitner (yellow card) 27'; Cvetko (yellow card) 47'; Michorl (yellow card) 57'	Report	Hoffmann 12', 26'; Diarra (yellow card) 55'; Feldhofer (yellow card) 63', (goal) 63'; Pines 66' (o.g.)	Stadium: Merkur-Arena; Attendance: 6,567; Referee: Isa Simsek

=== Austrian Cup ===
26 July 2026 First round	SC Imst	1–3	TSV Hartberg	Imst
17:00	Steinlechner (yellow card) 21'; Marberger (yellow card) 25'; Lamp (yellow card) 38'; Demir 43'	Report	Markuš 12'; Hoffmann 23'; Diarra (yellow card) 83'; Drew 90+1', (yellow card) 90+3'	Stadium: Velly Arena Imst Tirol; Attendance: 500; Referee: Samuel Sampl

6 September 2026 Second round	SK Vorwärts Steyr	0–4	TSV Hartberg	Steyr
17:00	Martić (yellow card) 73'	Report	Kainz 15'; Gattermayer 17'; Hoffmann 30'; Dalpiaz 41'; Feldhofer (yellow card) 82'	Stadium: Vorwärts Stadium; Attendance: 2,000; Referee: Daniel Pfister

27 October 2026 Third round	Austria Wien	1–1 (a.e.t.) (3–5 p)	TSV Hartberg	Wien
18:00	Eggestein 26'; Fischer (yellow card) 30'; Buhari (yellow card) 35'; Boateng (yellow card) 111'	Report	Lukić 44'; Coulibaly (yellow card) 67'; Diarra (yellow card) 90+3'; Spendlhofer (yellow card) 92'; Dalpiaz (yellow card) 95'	Stadium: Generali Arena; Attendance: 11,355; Referee: Harald Lechner
	Penalties
	Wustinger (penalty scored); Müller (penalty missed); Nnodim (penalty scored); T. Lee (penalty scored)		Markuš (penalty scored); Karner (penalty scored); Urrutia (penalty scored); Diarra (penalty scored); Spendlhofer (penalty scored)

9 February 2027 Fourth round	TSV Hartberg	v	Austria Lustenau	Hartberg
TBC		Report		Stadium: Profertil Arena Hartberg

== Statistics ==
=== Appearances and goals ===
As of match played 30 October 2026

Players with no appearances are not included on the list
Italics indicate a loaned in player

No.	Pos	Nat	Player	Total		Bundesliga		Austrian Cup	
No.	Pos	Nat	Player	Apps	Goals	Apps	Goals	Apps	Goals
2	DF	(Austria) AUT	Luca Pazourek	4	0	0+2	0	1+1	0
4	MF	(Slovenia) SLO	Benjamin Markuš	14	2	11+0	1	3+0	1
5	MF	(Mali) MLI	Youba Diarra	13	0	9+2	0	0+2	0
6	DF	(Ivory Coast) CIV	Habib Coulibaly	13	0	8+3	0	1+1	0
7	FW	(Austria) AUT	Angelo Gattermayer	14	2	10+1	1	2+1	1
8	FW	(Austria) AUT	Matthias Postl	4	0	1+1	0	2+0	0
9	FW	(Spain) ESP	Augustin Urrutia	7	0	0+5	0	0+2	0
10	MF	(Austria) AUT	Oliver Lukić	12	2	6+4	1	2+0	1
11	FW	(Australia) AUS	Jed Drew	12	2	1+8	1	1+2	1
12	DF	(Austria) AUT	Manuel Pfeifer	3	0	3+0	0	0+0	0
14	DF	(Austria) AUT	Paul Komposch	14	0	11+0	0	3+0	0
16	DF	(Austria) AUT	Magnus Dalpiaz	11	2	6+2	1	2+1	1
17	MF	(Austria) AUT	Jonas Karner	7	1	2+2	1	1+2	0
18	DF	(Austria) AUT	Fabian Wilfinger	9	0	7+0	0	2+0	0
19	DF	(Austria) AUT	Lukas Spendlhofer	7	0	2+3	0	1+1	0
21	GK	(Austria) AUT	Luka Marić	2	0	0+0	0	2+0	0
22	FW	(Austria) AUT	Marco Hoffmann	14	10	11+0	8	3+0	2
23	MF	(Austria) AUT	Tobias Kainz	14	1	7+4	0	3+0	1
27	DF	(Austria) AUT	Konstantin Schopp	12	1	10+0	1	2+0	0
28	MF	(Austria) AUT	Florian Gerstl	2	0	1+1	0	0+0	0
49	FW	(Montenegro) MNE	Andrija Radulović	6	2	0+5	2	0+1	0
70	FW	(Germany) GER	Chilohem Onuoha	2	0	0+2	0	0+0	0
77	FW	(Austria) AUT	David Korherr	1	0	0+1	0	0+0	0
91	GK	(Hungary) HUN	Ármin Pécsi	12	0	11+0	0	1+0	0
95	MF	(Austria) AUT	Nikolaus Feldhofer	12	2	4+5	2	1+2	0
