= 2024–25 FC Red Bull Salzburg season =

Red Bull Salzburg
2024–25 season
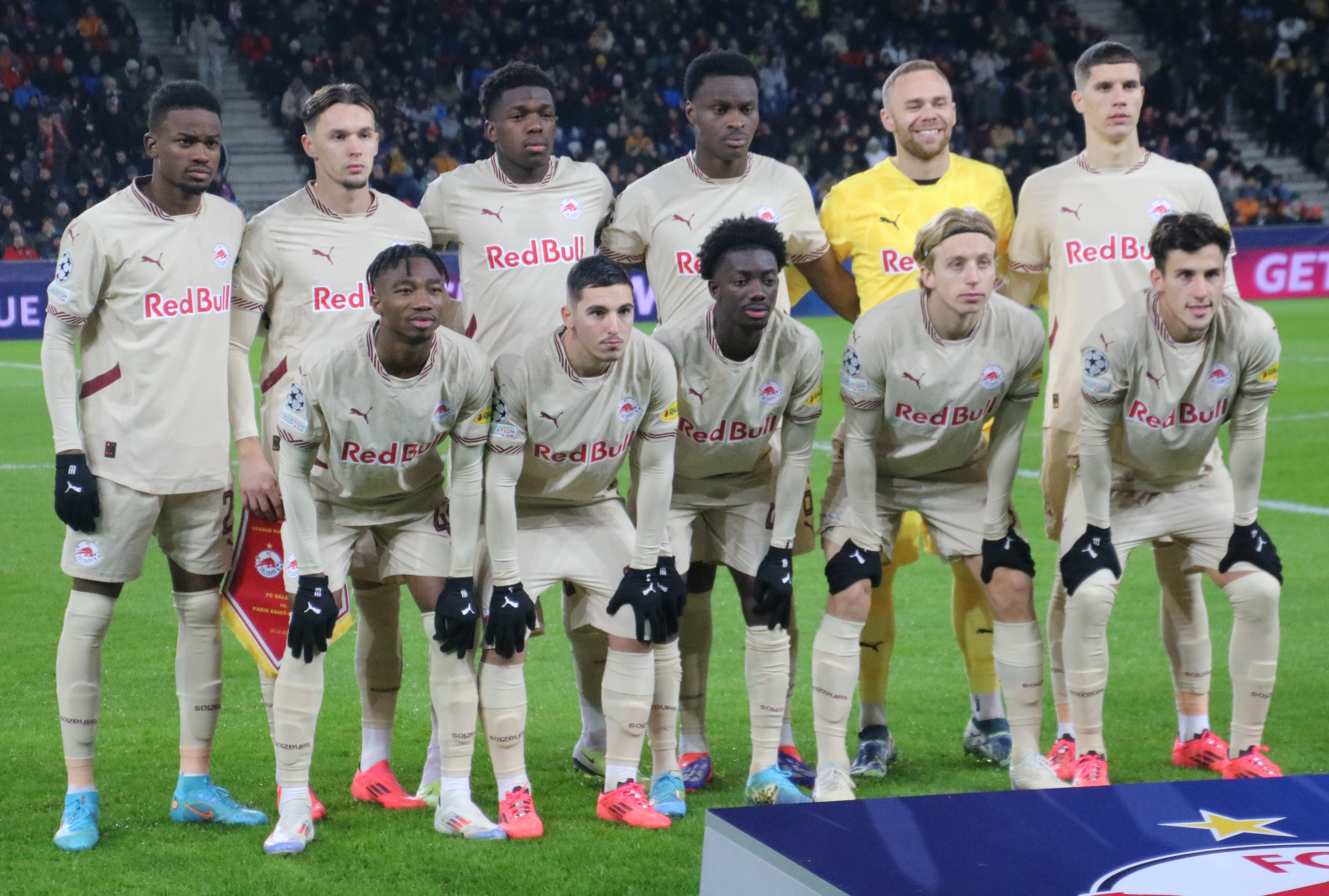
- FC Red Bull Salzburg before a UEFA Champions League match in December 2024
- Head coach: Pepijn Lijnders (until 16 December); Thomas Letsch (from 18 December)
- Stadium: Red Bull Arena
- Bundesliga: 2nd
- Austrian Cup: Quarter-finals
- UEFA Champions League: League phase
- FIFA Club World Cup: Group stage
- Top goalscorer: League: Dorgeles Nene (13); All: Dorgeles Nene (15)
- Average home league attendance: 12,069
Home colours	Away colours	European colours

The 2024–25 season was the 92nd season in the history of Red Bull Salzburg, and the club's 36th consecutive season in the top flight of Austrian football. In addition to the domestic league, the club participated in the Austrian Cup, the UEFA Champions League, and had a debut appearance in the FIFA Club World Cup.

== Transfers ==
=== In ===
Pos.	Player	Transferred from	Fee	Date	Source
DF	(Poland) Kamil Piątkowski	(Spain) Granada	Loan return	30 June 2024	
MF	(Mali) Mamadou Sangaré	(Austria) TSV Hartberg	Loan return	30 June 2024	
MF	(Nigeria) Samson Tijani	(Austria) Wolfsberger AC	Loan return	30 June 2024	
DF	(Belgium) Ignace Van Der Brempt	(Germany) Hamburger SV	Loan return	30 June 2024	
MF	(Austria) Dijon Kameri	(Switzerland) Grasshopper Club Zurich	Loan return	30 June 2024	
GK	(Germany) Nico Mantl	(Denmark) Viborg	Loan return	30 June 2024	
MF	(Ghana) Lawrence Agyekum	(Austria) FC Liefering	Loan return	30 June 2024	
DF	(Austria) Lukas Ibertsberger	(Austria) Wolfsberger AC	Loan return	30 June 2024	
FW	(Switzerland) Federico Crescenti	(Austria) Schwarz-Weiß Bregenz	Loan return	30 June 2024	
DF	(Colombia) Lucho	(Austria) Kapfenberger SV	Loan return	30 June 2024	
GK	(Germany) Janis Blaswich	(Germany) RB Leipzig	Loan (€1,000,000)	1 July 2024	
MF	(Japan) Takumu Kawamura	(Japan) Sanfrecce Hiroshima	€1,500,000	1 July 2024	
MF	(Croatia) Oliver Lukić	(Austria) FC Liefering	Promoted	1 July 2024	
GK	(Austria) Salko Hamzić	(Austria) FC Liefering	Promoted	1 July 2024	
MF	(England) Bobby Clark	(England) Liverpool	€11,800,000	22 August 2024	
FW	(Italy) Nicolò Turco	(Austria) FC Liefering	Loan return	28 August 2024	
FW	(Ghana) Edmund Baidoo	(Norway) Sogndal	€3,300,000	29 August 2024	
DF	(France) Joane Gadou	(France) Paris Saint-Germain	€10,000,000	3 September 2024	
DF^{a}	(Germany) Frans Krätzig	(Germany) Bayern Munich	€3,500,000	1 June 2025	
DF^{a}	(Austria) Stefan Lainer	(Germany) Borussia Mönchengladbach	Free	8 June 2025	
DF^{a}	(Denmark) Jacob Rasmussen	(Denmark) Brøndby	€1,500,000	9 June 2025	
MF^{a}	(Japan) Sōta Kitano	(Japan) Cerezo Osaka	Undisclosed	9 June 2025	
DF^{a}	(Bosnia and Herzegovina) Amar Dedić	(France) Marseille	Loan return (€100,000)	10 June 2025	

=== Out ===
Pos.	Player	Transferred to	Fee	Date	Source
DF	(Austria) Andreas Ulmer	—N/a	End of contract	1 July 2024	
FW	(Mali) Sékou Koïta	(Russia) CSKA Moscow	End of contract	1 July 2024	
GK	(Germany) Nico Mantl	(Portugal) Arouca	€500,000	1 July 2024	
MF	(Mali) Mamadou Sangaré	(Austria) Rapid Wien	€700,000	1 July 2024	
DF	(Austria) Lukas Ibertsberger	(Austria) FC Blau-Weiß Linz	Undisclosed	1 July 2024	
FW	(Switzerland) Federico Crescenti	(Liechtenstein) Vaduz	Loan	1 July 2024	
DF	(Austria) Justin Omoregie	(Austria) TSV Hartberg	Loan	1 July 2024	
MF	(Ghana) Lawrence Agyekum	(Belgium) Cercle Brugge	Loan	4 July 2024	
DF	(Germany) Kilian Ludewig	—N/a	Contract termination	5 July 2024	
DF	(Colombia) Lucho	(Albania) Skënderbeu Korçë	Undisclosed	10 July 2024	
DF	(Serbia) Strahinja Pavlović	(Italy) AC Milan	€18,000,000	31 July 2024	
GK	(Germany) Timo Horn	(Germany) VfL Bochum	End of contract	1 August 2024	
MF	(Croatia) Luka Sučić	(Spain) Real Sociedad	€10,000,000	2 August 2024	
MF	(Ghana) Forson Amankwah	(England) Norwich City	€4,500,000	9 August 2024	
DF	(Austria) Lukas Wallner	(Germany) Hannover 96 II	Free	14 August 2024	
GK	(Germany) Jonas Krumrey	(Denmark) Lyngby	Loan	20 August 2024	
MF	(Austria) Dijon Kameri	(Austria) Rheindorf Altach	Loan	21 August 2024	
FW	(Italy) Nicolò Turco	(Italy) Milan Futuro	Loan	29 August 2024	
FW	(Croatia) Roko Šimić	(England) Cardiff City	€2,000,000	30 August 2024	
DF	(Belgium) Ignace Van Der Brempt	(Italy) Como	Loan	30 August 2024	
MF	(Nigeria) Samson Tijani	(Norway) Fredrikstad	Loan	2 September 2024	
MF	(Mali) Soumaïla Diabaté	(Austria) FC Blau-Weiß Linz	Loan	5 September 2024	
DF	(France) Oumar Solet	—N/a	Contract termination	14 September 2024	

Notes

- ^a Signed as part of an exceptional registration window from 1 to 10 June 2025 for clubs participating in the 2025 FIFA Club World Cup.

== Friendlies ==
=== Pre-season ===
The pre-season training is scheduled to commence on 24 June, followed by a training camp in Saalfelden from 6 to 17 July.

29 June 2024 Friendly	Red Bull Salzburg	v	Panathinaikos

29 June 2024 Friendly	Red Bull Salzburg	3–0	SpVgg Unterhaching	Anif
17:00	Daghim 43'; Kjærgaard 45+1'; Blank 69'			Stadium: Sportzentrum Anif

6 July 2024 Friendly	SV Kuchl	1–8	Red Bull Salzburg	Kuchl
15:00 UTC+2	Hoedl 9'	Report	Simic 1', 15'; Konate 54', 64', 65', 80', 86'; Amankwah 85'	Stadium: Andreas Wimmer Arena

13 July 2024 Friendly	Red Bull Salzburg	2–2	Sparta Prague	St. Johann in Tirol
15:30	Gloukh 7'; Nene 26'		Daněk 14'; Olatunji 80'	Stadium: Koasastadion St. Johann

17 July 2024 Friendly	Red Bull Salzburg	1–0	Rijeka	Anif
18:00	Daghim 60'			Stadium: Sportzentrum Anif

20 July 2024 Friendly	Red Bull Salzburg	4–0	Sheffield Wednesday	Wals-Siezenheim
21:00	Dedić 11'; Kjærgaard 34'; Konaté 58'; Daghim 69'			Stadium: Red Bull Arena

== Competitions ==
=== Overall record ===
Competition	First match	Last match	Starting round	Final position	Record							
Competition	First match	Last match	Starting round	Final position	Pld	W	D	L	GF	GA	GD	Win %
Bundesliga	2 August 2024	24 May 2025	Matchday 1	2nd	32	16	9	7	53	36	+17	50.00
Austrian Cup	26 July 2024	2 February 2025	First round	Quarter-finals	4	3	0	1	14	2	+12	75.00
UEFA Champions League	6 August 2024	29 January 2025	Third qualifying round	League phase	12	3	2	7	13	32	−19	25.00
FIFA Club World Cup	18 June 2025	26 June 2025	Group stage	Group stage	3	1	1	1	2	4	−2	33.33
Total					51	23	12	16	82	74	+8	45.10

Source: Soccerway

=== Bundesliga ===
==== League table ====
Pos	Team	Pld	W	D	L	GF	GA	GD	Pts	Qualification
1	Sturm Graz	22	14	4	4	51	28	+23	46	Qualification for the Championship round
2	Austria Wien	22	14	4	4	36	19	+17	46	Qualification for the Championship round
3	Red Bull Salzburg	22	10	8	4	33	22	+11	38	Qualification for the Championship round
4	Wolfsberg	22	11	3	8	44	30	+14	36	Qualification for the Championship round
5	Rapid Wien	22	9	7	6	32	24	+8	34	Qualification for the Championship round

Source: Austrian Football Bundesliga
Rules for classification: 1) Points; 2) Head-to-head record; 3) Goal difference; 4) Goals scored; 5) Matches won; 6) Away matches won; 7) Away goals scored.

==== Results summary ====
Overall								Home						Away					
Pld	W	D	L	GF	GA	GD	Pts	W	D	L	GF	GA	GD	W	D	L	GF	GA	GD
22	10	8	4	33	22	+11	38	7	3	1	24	8	+16	3	5	3	9	14	−5

Last updated: 23 March 2025.
Source: Bundesliga

==== Results by round ====
Round	1	2	3	4	5	6	7	8	9	10	11	12
Ground	A	H	A	H	A	H	A	H	A	H	A	
Result	W	W	W	P	L	-	D	W	L	W	D	
Position	1	1	1	1	4	5	5	3	5	4	5	

Source: ADMIRAL Bundesliga
A = Away; H = Home; W = Win; D = Draw; L = Loss

==== Matches ====
2 August 2024 1	Grazer AK	2–3	Red Bull Salzburg	Graz, Austria
20:30	M. Lang 10'; Vučić 18'; Italiano (yellow card) 78'; Atsushi (yellow card) 90+2'	Report	Rosenberger 4' (o.g.); Nene 6'; Konaté 45+1' (pen.); Lucas (yellow card) 86'	Stadium: Liebenauer Stadium; Attendance: 9,877; Referee: Julian Weinberger

10 August 2024 2	Red Bull Salzburg	5–1	FC Blau-Weiß Linz	Salzburg, Austria
19:30	Gloukh 15', 34', 62'; Piątkowski (yellow card) 32'; Yeo 73'; Bidstrup 77'	Report	Maranda (yellow card) 3'; Noß 12'; Briedl (yellow card) 85'	Stadium: Red Bull Arena; Attendance: 12,483; Referee: Safak Barmaksiz

17 August 2024 3	LASK	0–1	Red Bull Salzburg	Linz, Austria
19:30	Ziereis (yellow card) 11'; Jovičić (yellow card) 31'; Tibidi (yellow card) 84'	Report	Yeo 64'; Daghim (yellow card) 71'	Stadium: Raiffeisen Arena; Attendance: 15,640; Referee: Alexander Harkam

1 September 2024 5	SK Rapid Wien	3–2	Red Bull Salzburg	Vienna, Austria
17:00	Jansson 20', 60'; Auer 38'; Bolla (yellow card) 63'	Report	Nene 5' (yellow card) 90+3'; Ratkov 45+3'; Lucas (yellow card) 48'; Yeo; (yellow card) 51': Diambou (yellow card) 90+1'	Stadium: Allianz Stadion; Attendance: 21,540; Referee: Stefan Ebner

22 September 2024 7	WSG Tirol	0–0	Red Bull Salzburg	Innsbruck, Austria
17:00	Sulzbacher (yellow card) 43'	Report	Amar (yellow card) 80'	Stadium: Tivoli Stadion Tirol; Attendance: 3,650; Referee: Jakob Semler

28 September 2024 8	Red Bull Salzburg	2–0	FK Austria Wien	Salzburg, Austria
17:00	Gloukh 10' (pen.), 88'	Report	Barry (yellow card) 9'; Fitz (yellow card) 41'; Ranftl (yellow card) 52'	Stadium: Red Bull Arena; Attendance: 12,586; Referee: Alan Kijas

6 October 2024 9	SK Sturm Graz	5–0	Red Bull Salzburg	Graz, Austria
17:00	Yalcouyé 15'; Biereth 30', 51', 62'; Aiwu (yellow card) 41' (goal) 76'	Report	Piątkowski (yellow card) 66'; Bajcetic (yellow card) 90'	Stadium: Liebenauer Stadium; Attendance: 15,459; Referee: Julian Weinberger

19 October 2024 10	Red Bull Salzburg	2–1	SC Rheindorf Altach	Salzburg, Austria
17:00	Bidstrup (yellow card) 45+1'; Diambou (yellow card) 61'; Konaté 84'; E. Baidoo 86'	Report	Gebauer (yellow card) 18'; Kameri (yellow card) 46'; Fridrikas (yellow card) 59'	Stadium: Red Bull Arena; Attendance: 8,615; Referee: Josef Spurny

27 October 2024 11	Wolfsberger AC	0–0	Red Bull Salzburg	Wolfsberg, Austria
17:00	Pink (red card) 51'	Report	Lucas (yellow card) 55'; Bajcetic (yellow card) 58'; Baidoo (yellow card) 63'	Stadium: Lavanttal-Arena; Attendance: 4,125; Referee: Christian-Petru Ciochirca

2 November 2024 12	Red Bull Salzburg	0–0	Grazer AK	Salzburg, Austria
18:00	Gadou (red card) 43'; Capaldo (yellow card) 48'; Clark (yellow card) 69'; Bajcetic (yellow card) 76'	Report	Gantschnig (yellow card) 19'; Rosenberger (yellow card) 24'; Vučić (yellow card) 84'	Stadium: Red Bull Arena; Attendance: 13,551; Referee: Julian Weinberger

10 November 2024 13	FC Blau-Weiß Linz	2–0	Red Bull Salzburg	Linz, Austria
14:30	Ronivaldo 46', (yellow card) 85'; Briedl 59'; Mensah (yellow card) 90+2'	Report	Gourna-Douath (yellow card) 44'	Stadium: Donauparkstadion; Attendance: 5,303; Referee: Markus Hameter

23 November 2024 14	Red Bull Salzburg	1–2	LASK	Salzburg, Austria
17:00	Yeo 42', (yellow card) 62'	Report	Konaté 73' (o.g.); Entrup 88'	Stadium: Red Bull Arena; Attendance: 12,923; Referee: Jakob Semler

30 November 2024 15	TSV Hartberg	1–1	Red Bull Salzburg	Hartberg, Austria
17:00	Diarra 71'; Markus (yellow card) 85'	Report	Capaldo 44', (yellow card) 58'; Yeo (yellow card) 64'	Stadium: Profertil Arena Hartberg; Attendance: 2,295; Referee: Alan Kijas

4 December 2024 4	Red Bull Salzburg	4–0	TSV Hartberg	Salzburg, Austria
20:30	Capaldo 34', 51'; Gloukh 36'; Bidstrup (yellow card) 52'; Daghim 75'; Guindo (yellow card) 83'	Report	Sallinger (yellow card) 28'; Karamatic (yellow card) 37'; Wilfinger (yellow card) 53'; Avdijaj (yellow card) 58'; Markus (yellow card) 72'	Stadium: Red Bull Arena; Attendance: 8,335; Referee: Daniel Pfister

7 December 2024 16	Red Bull Salzburg	2–2	SK Rapid Wien	Salzburg, Austria
17:00	Capaldo 34'; Nene 57'; Daghim (yellow card) 90+4'	Report	Auer 48'; Jansson 74'	Stadium: Red Bull Arena; Attendance: 12,556; Referee: Stefan Ebner

14 December 2024 6	Red Bull Salzburg	3–0	SK Austria Klagenfurt	Salzburg, Austria
17:00	Gloukh 41'; Nene 44'; Clark 74'	Report	Kitz (yellow card) 10'; Robatsch (yellow card) 65'	Stadium: Red Bull Arena; Attendance: 10.987; Referee: Alain Sadikovski

9 February 2025 17	SK Austria Klagenfurt	0–0	Red Bull Salzburg	Klagenfurt, Austria
14:30	Gkezos (yellow card) 50'; Koch (yellow card) 66'	Report	Capaldo (yellow card) 10'; Bidstrup (yellow card) 87'	Stadium: Wörthersee Stadion; Attendance: 5,659; Referee: Safak Barmaksiz

15 February 2025 18	Red Bull Salzburg	1–1	WSG Tirol	Salzburg, Austria
17:00	Blank (yellow card) 22'; Yeo 53'; Bidstrup (yellow card) 71'	Report	Butler 2', (yellow card) 22'; Müller (yellow card) 68'	Stadium: Red Bull Arena; Attendance: 9,217; Referee: Jakob Semler

22 February 2025 19	FK Austria Wien	0–1	Red Bull Salzburg	Vienna, Austria
17:00	Dragović (yellow card) 66'	Report	Baidoo (yellow card) 4'; Gloukh 7'; Yeo (yellow card) 78'; Diambou (yellow card) 90'	Stadium: Franz Horr Stadium; Attendance: 13,699; Referee: Stefan Ebner

1 March 2025 20	Red Bull Salzburg	3–1	SK Sturm Graz	Salzburg, Austria
17:00	Vertessen 72'; Nene 83'; Onisiwo 87'	Report	Gorenc Stanković 10'; Lavalée (yellow card) 39'; Aiwu (yellow card) 45'; Kiteishvili (yellow card) 53'	Stadium: Red Bull Arena; Attendance: 12,990; Referee: Walter Altmann

9 March 2025 21	SC Rheindorf Altach	1–1	Red Bull Salzburg	Altach, Austria
17:00	Kaiba (yellow card) 37'; Lukačević (yellow card) 63'; Ingolitsch (yellow card) 67' (yellow-red card) 90+6'; Dietz 80'; Fridrikas (yellow card) 90+2'	Report	Vertessen 11'; Schlager (yellow card) 78'; Bidstrup (yellow card) 90+2'	Stadium: Stadion Schnabelholz; Attendance: 4,865; Referee: Isa Simsek

16 March 2025 22	Red Bull Salzburg	1–0	Wolfsberger AC	Salzburg, Austria
17:00	Gloukh 13'; Capaldo (yellow card) 87'; Clark (yellow card) 89'	Report	Ballo (yellow card) 16'; Jašić (yellow card) 45+1'	Stadium: Red Bull Arena; Attendance: 10,048; Referee: Alain Sadikovski

==== League table ====
Pos	Team	Pld	W	D	L	GF	GA	GD	Pts	Qualification
1	Sturm Graz (C)	32	19	6	7	66	39	+27	40	Qualification for the Champions League play-off round
2	Red Bull Salzburg	32	16	9	7	53	36	+17	38	Qualification for the Champions League second qualifying round
3	Austria Wien	32	18	6	8	47	32	+15	37	Qualification for the Conference League second qualifying round
4	Wolfsberg	32	16	7	9	60	38	+22	37	Qualification for the Europa League third qualifying round (Note: Wolfsberg qualified for the Europa League third qualifying round as the 2024–25 Austrian Cup winners.)
5	Rapid Wien (O)	32	12	8	12	43	42	+1	27	Qualification for the Conference League play-offs

Source: Austrian Football Bundesliga
Rules for classification: 1) Points; 2) Points with (possible) half points subtracted due to rounding; 3) Head-to-head points; 4) Head-to-head goal difference; 5) Head-to-head goals scored; 6) Goal difference; 7) Goals scored; 8) Matches won; 9) Away matches won; 10) Away goals scored.
(C) Champions; (O) Play-off winners

==== Results summary ====
Overall								Home						Away					
Pld	W	D	L	GF	GA	GD	Pts	W	D	L	GF	GA	GD	W	D	L	GF	GA	GD
6	3	1	2	10	7	+3	10	1	1	1	4	4	0	2	0	1	6	3	+3

Last updated: 30 April 2025.
Source: Bundesliga

==== Results by round ====
Round	1
Ground	
Result	
Position	

Source: Austrian Football Bundesliga
A = Away; H = Home; W = Win; D = Draw; L = Loss

==== Matches ====
30 March 2025 23	SK Rapid Wien	0–2	Red Bull Salzburg	Vienna, Austria
17:00	Grgić (yellow card) 23'; Auer (yellow card) 80'; Kara (yellow card) 88'; Cvetković (yellow card) 90'	Report	Yeo (yellow card) 11'; Vertessen 37', 48'; Capaldo (yellow card) 74'; Baidoo (yellow card) 88'	Stadium: Allianz Stadion; Attendance: 11,680; Referee: Alexander Harkam

6 April 2025 24	Red Bull Salzburg	2–1	FC Blau-Weiß Linz	Salzburg, Austria
14:30	Nene 55'; Baidoo 71'; Ratkov (yellow card) 87'	Report	Mitrović 82'	Stadium: Red Bull Arena; Attendance: 12,074; Referee: Jakob Semler

13 April 2025 25	Red Bull Salzburg	1–2	SK Sturm Graz	Salzburg, Austria
14:30	Yeo (yellow card) 6'; Daghim 32'	Report	Kiteishvili 49' (pen.), 70'; Aiwu (yellow card) 54'; Wüthrich (red card) 63'; Yalcouyé (yellow card) 71'	Stadium: Red Bull Arena; Attendance: 15,941; Referee: Harald Lechner

20 April 2025 26	FK Austria Wien	1–3	Red Bull Salzburg	Vienna, Austria
17:00	Malone 18'; Ranftl (yellow card) 42'; Handl (yellow card) 42'; Dragović (yellow card) 69'	Report	Vertessen 8', (yellow card) 59'; Nene 10', 64' (pen.); Terzić (yellow card) 51'; Schlager (yellow card) 89'	Stadium: Franz Horr Stadium; Referee: Christian-Petru Ciochirca

23 April 2025 27	Red Bull Salzburg	1–1	Wolfsberger AC	Salzburg, Austria
18:30	Yeo 68'	Report	Ballo 7'; Baumgartner (yellow card) 47'; Zukić (yellow card) 61'; Piesinger (yellow card) 72'	Stadium: Red Bull Arena; Attendance: 9,286; Referee: Stefan Ebner

27 April 2025 28	Wolfsberger AC	2–1	Red Bull Salzburg	Wolfsberg, Austria
14:30	Nwaiwu 15'; Baumgartner (yellow card) 31'; Kojzek 54'	Report	Trummer (yellow card) 41'; Diambou (yellow card) 53'; Daghim (yellow card) 58'; Schlager (yellow card) 65'; Baidoo (yellow card) 90' (yellow-red card) 90'; Vertessen (yellow card) 90'; Nene 90+4' (pen.)	Stadium: Lavanttal-Arena; Referee: Daniel Pfister

4 May 2025 29	Red Bull Salzburg	2–0	FK Austria Wien	Salzburg, Austria
17:00	Nene 80'; Ratkov 89'	Report	Plavotić (yellow card) 43'	Stadium: Red Bull Arena; Attendance: 13,758; Referee: Markus Hameter

9 May 2025 30	SK Sturm Graz	4–2	Red Bull Salzburg	Graz, Austria
19:30	Terzić 18' (o.g.); Bøving 20'; Wüthrich 48'; Chukwuani 72'	Report	Nene 45'; Aiwu 59' (o.g.); Gadou (yellow card) 68'	Stadium: Liebenauer Stadium; Attendance: 15,919; Referee: Julian Weinberger

18 May 2025 31	FC Blau-Weiß Linz	1–2	Red Bull Salzburg	Linz, Austria
17:00	Seidl 9'; Dobras (yellow card) 20'	Report	Ratkov 79'; Baidoo 90+4'	Stadium: Donauparkstadion; Attendance: 5,595; Referee: Markus Hameter

24 May 2025 32	Red Bull Salzburg	4–2	SK Rapid Wien	Salzburg, Austria
17:00	Gloukh 8'; Nene 12', 56'; Baidoo 24'	Report	Radulović 19'; Burgstaller 64'; Vincze (yellow card) 72'	Stadium: Red Bull Arena; Attendance: 16,029; Referee: Alexander Harkam

=== Austrian Cup ===
26 July 2024 First round	FC Dornbirn 1913	0–6	Red Bull Salzburg	Dornbirn
18:00	Mbanga (yellow card) 85'; Brzaj (yellow card) 90+2'	Report	Konaté 29', 32'; Daghim 35'; Kjærgaard 38'; Lucas 63'; Diambou 83'	Stadium: Stadion Birkenwiese; Attendance: 1,500; Referee: Stjepan Bosnjak

25 September 2024 Second round	Wiener Viktoria	0–4	Red Bull Salzburg	Vienna
18.00	Sinij (yellow card) 53'; Sahanek (yellow card) 65'; C. Seidl (yellow card) 70'; Sinner (yellow card) 78'	Report	Ratkov 1'; E. Baidoo 3'; Capaldo (yellow card) 57'; Sinner 60' (o.g.); Blank (yellow card) 61'; Konaté 68'	Stadium: Sportplatz Wiener Viktoria; Attendance: 2,500; Referee: Greinecker Markus

3 October 2024 Third round	Red Bull Salzburg	3–0	WSG Tirol	Wals-Siezenheim
20.30	Bajcetic (yellow card) 3'; Konaté 35' (pen.); Gadou (yellow card) 43'; Terzić 53'; Daghim 84'	Report	Taferner (yellow card) 1'; Blume (yellow card) 30'; Vötter (yellow card) 81'; Lawrence (yellow card) 90+2'	Stadium: Red Bull Arena; Attendance: 2,437; Referee: Harald Lechner

2 February 2025 Quarter-final	LASK	2–1 (a.e.t.)	Red Bull Salzburg	Linz, Austria
18:15	Horvath (yellow card) 60'; Jovičić 71'; Bogarde (yellow card) 74'; Berisha (yellow card) 79'; Adeniran (yellow card) 90+3', (goal) 109'	Report	Gloukh 33'; Yeo (yellow card) 60'; Terzić (yellow card) 79'	Stadium: Raiffeisen Arena; Attendance: 12,310; Referee: Harald Lechner

=== UEFA Champions League ===
==== Third qualifying round ====
===== League Path =====
6 August 2024 Third qualifying round	Red Bull Salzburg (Austria)	2–1	(Netherlands) Twente	Wals-Siezenheim
20:45	Kjærgaard 40', 85'	Report	Vlap 90'	Stadium: Red Bull Arena; Attendance: 17,381; Referee: (Portugal) António Nobre

13 August 2024 Third qualifying round	Twente (Netherlands)	3–3 (4–5 agg.)	(Austria) Red Bull Salzburg	Enschede
19:00	Hilgers 43'; Van Hoorenbeeck 64'; Steijn 87'	Report	Kjærgaard 17'; Nene 25'; Yeo 46'	Stadium: De Grolsch Veste; Attendance: 29,200; Referee: (Bosnia and Herzegovina) Irfan Peljto

==== Play-off round ====
===== League Path =====
21 August 2024 Play-off round	Dynamo Kyiv (Ukraine)	0–2	(Austria) Red Bull Salzburg	Lublin, Poland (Note: Due to the Russian invasion of Ukraine, Ukrainian teams are required to play their home matches at neutral venues until further notice.)
21:00		Report	Nene 29'; Kjærgaard 50' (pen.)	Stadium: Arena Lublin; Attendance: 7,126; Referee: (Switzerland) Sandro Schärer

27 August 2024 Play-off round	Red Bull Salzburg (Austria)	1–1 (3–1 agg.)	(Ukraine) Dynamo Kyiv	Wals-Siezenheim
21:00	Daghim 12'	Report	Vanat 29'	Stadium: Red Bull Arena; Attendance: 23,289; Referee: (Turkey) Halil Umut Meler

==== League phase ====
The draw for the league phase was held on 29 August 2024.

Pos	Team	Pld	W	D	L	GF	GA	GD	Pts
32	(German Football Association) RB Leipzig	8	1	0	7	8	15	−7	3
33	(Royal Spanish Football Federation) Girona	8	1	0	7	5	13	−8	3
34	(Austrian Football Association) Red Bull Salzburg	8	1	0	7	5	27	−22	3
35	(Slovak Football Association) Slovan Bratislava	8	0	0	8	7	27	−20	0
36	(Swiss Football Association) Young Boys	8	0	0	8	3	24	−21	0

Source: UEFA
Rules for classification: League phase tiebreakers

Round	1	2	3	4	5	6	7	8
Ground	A	H	H	A	H	A	A	H
Result	L	L	L	W	L	L	L	L
Position	31	34	34	30	32	32		34
Points	0	0	0	3	3	3	3	3

Source: UEFA
A = Away; H = Home; W = Win; D = Draw; L = Loss

18 September 2024 League phase	Sparta Prague (Czech Republic)	3–0	(Austria) Red Bull Salzburg	Prague
18:45	Kairinen 2'; Olatunji 42'; Laçi 58'	Report		Stadium: Stadion Letná; Attendance: 17,612; Referee: (Slovenia) Rade Oberenović

1 October 2024 League phase	Red Bull Salzburg (Austria)	0–4	(France) Brest	Wals-Siezenheim
18:45		Report	Sima 21', 70'; Camara 66'; Pereira Lage 75'	Stadium: Red Bull Arena; Attendance: 20,232; Referee: (England) Anthony Taylor

23 October 2024 League phase	Red Bull Salzburg (Austria)	0–2	(Croatia) Dinamo Zagreb	Wals-Siezenheim
21:00		Report	Kulenović 49'; Petković 84'	Stadium: Red Bull Arena (Salzburg); Attendance: 24,018; Referee: (Netherlands) Danny Makkelie

6 November 2024 League phase	Feyenoord (Netherlands)	1–3	(Austria) Red Bull Salzburg	Rotterdam
21:00	Hadj Moussa 80'	Report	Konaté 45+2', 56'; Guindo 86'	Stadium: De Kuip; Referee: (Lithuania) Donatas Rumšas

26 November 2024 League phase	Bayer Leverkusen (Germany)	5–0	(Austria) Red Bull Salzburg	Leverkusen
21:00	Witrz (8(pen.)), 30'; Grimaldo 11'; Schick 61'; Garcia 72'	Report		Stadium: BayArena; Referee: (Ukraine) Mykola Balakin

10 December 2024 League phase	Red Bull Salzburg (Austria)	0–3	(France) Paris Saint-Germain	Wals-Siezenheim
21:00		Report	Ramos 30'; Mendes 72'; Doué 85'	Stadium: Red Bull Arena (Salzburg); Referee: (England) Michael Oliver

22 January 2025 League phase	Real Madrid (Spain)	5–1	(Austria) Red Bull Salzburg	Madrid
21:00	Rodrygo 23', 34'*; Mbappé 48'*; Vinícius 55', 77'*	Report	Bidstrup 85'	Stadium: Santiago Bernabéu; Attendance: 73,692; Referee: (Sweden) Glenn Nyberg

29 January 2025 League phase	Red Bull Salzburg (Austria)	1–4	(Spain) Atlético Madrid	Wals-Siezenheim
21:00	Capaldo (yellow card) 58'; Blank (yellow card) 66'; Daghim 90+1'	Report	Griezmann 5', 13', 45+1'; Llorente 63'	Stadium: Red Bull Arena (Salzburg); Referee: (England) Anthony Taylor

=== FIFA Club World Cup ===
==== Group stage ====
The draw for the group stage was held on 5 December 2024.

Pos	Team	Pld	W	D	L	GF	GA	GD	Pts	Qualification
1	(Spain) Real Madrid	3	2	1	0	7	2	+5	7	Advance to knockout stage
2	(Saudi Arabia) Al Hilal	3	1	2	0	3	1	+2	5	Advance to knockout stage
3	(Austria) Red Bull Salzburg	3	1	1	1	2	4	−2	4	
4	(Mexico) Pachuca	3	0	0	3	2	7	−5	0	

Source: FIFA
Rules for classification: Group stage tiebreakers

18 June 2025 Group	Pachuca (Mexico)	1–2	(Austria) Red Bull Salzburg	Cincinnati, United States
18:00 EDT	González 56'; Pereira (yellow card) 75'	Report	Gloukh 42'; Onisiwo 76'	Stadium: TQL Stadium; Attendance: 5,282; Referee: Mustapha Ghorbal (Algeria)

22 June 2025 Group	Red Bull Salzburg (Austria)	0–0	(Saudi Arabia) Al-Hilal	Washington, D.C., United States
18:00 EDT	Diabate (yellow card) 36'; Kitano (yellow card) 85'	Report		Stadium: Audi Field; Attendance: 16,167; Referee: Wilton Sampaio (Brazil)

26 June 2025 Group	Red Bull Salzburg (Austria)	0–3	(Spain) Real Madrid	Philadelphia, United States
21:00 EDT		Report	Vinícius 40'; Valverde 45+3'; G. García 84'	Stadium: Lincoln Financial Field; Attendance: 64,811; Referee: Dahane Beida (Mauritania)

== Statistics ==
=== Appearances and goals ===
As of match played 27 June 2025

Players with no appearances are not included on the list
Italics indicate a loaned in player

No.	Pos	Nat	Player	Total		Bundesliga		Austrian Cup		UEFA Champions League		FIFA Club World Cup	
No.	Pos	Nat	Player	Apps	Goals	Apps	Goals	Apps	Goals	Apps	Goals	Apps	Goals
1	GK	(Germany) GER	Janis Blaswich	22	0	11+0	0	2+0	0	8+1	0	0+0	0
2	DF	(Belgium) BEL	Ignace Van der Brempt	4	0	1+0	0	0+0	0	1+2	0	0+0	0
2	DF	(Belgium) BEL	Maximiliano Caufriez	5	0	2+2	0	0+1	0	0+0	0	0+0	0
3	DF	(Serbia) SRB	Aleksa Terzić	34	1	17+5	0	3+0	1	8+1	0	0+0	0
4	DF	(Germany) GER	Hendry Blank	15	0	6+0	0	3+0	0	4+2	0	0+0	0
5	DF	(Switzerland) SUI	Bryan Okoh	1	0	0+0	0	0+1	0	0+0	0	0+0	0
5	MF	(Mali) MLI	Soumaïla Diabaté	3	0	0+0	0	0+0	0	0+0	0	2+1	0
6	DF	(Austria) AUT	Samson Baidoo	43	0	29+0	0	2+0	0	11+0	0	0+1	0
7	MF	(Argentina) ARG	Nicolás Capaldo	39	4	21+2	4	4+0	0	7+5	0	0+0	0
9	FW	(Austria) AUT	Karim Onisiwo	12	2	6+2	1	1+0	0	0+0	0	1+2	1
10	MF	(England) ENG	Bobby Clark	25	1	7+10	1	2+0	0	4+2	0	0+0	0
11	FW	(Belgium) BEL	Yorbe Vertessen	19	5	15+1	5	0+0	0	0+0	0	0+3	0
14	MF	(Denmark) DEN	Maurits Kjærgaard	14	4	5+1	0	1+0	1	5+0	3	0+2	0
15	MF	(Mali) MLI	Mamady Diambou	33	1	9+11	0	1+1	1	5+5	0	1+0	0
16	MF	(Japan) JPN	Takumu Kawamura	8	0	3+1	0	1+0	0	0+3	0	0+0	0
18	MF	(Denmark) DEN	Mads Bidstrup	45	2	24+6	1	2+1	0	8+1	1	3+0	0
19	FW	(Ivory Coast) CIV	Karim Konaté	17	8	9+0	2	2+1	4	4+1	2	0+0	0
20	FW	(Ghana) GHA	Edmund Baidoo	24	5	2+16	4	2+1	1	0+0	0	3+0	0
21	FW	(Serbia) SRB	Petar Ratkov	35	4	8+14	3	1+2	1	2+6	0	2+0	0
23	DF	(France) FRA	Joane Gadou	25	0	17+4	0	1+0	0	0+0	0	3+0	0
24	GK	(Austria) AUT	Alexander Schlager	27	0	21+0	0	2+0	0	4+0	0	0+0	0
25	MF	(Croatia) CRO	Oliver Lukić	2	0	0+0	0	0+1	0	0+1	0	0+0	0
27	MF	(France) FRA	Lucas Gourna-Douath	23	1	4+7	0	1+1	1	7+3	0	0+0	0
28	FW	(Denmark) DEN	Adam Daghim	47	6	18+11	2	2+2	2	6+5	2	0+3	0
29	DF	(Mali) MLI	Daouda Guindo	15	1	5+5	0	0+1	0	1+3	1	0+0	0
30	MF	(Israel) ISR	Oscar Gloukh	43	12	21+5	10	1+1	1	12+0	0	3+0	1
36	DF	(Sweden) SWE	John Mellberg	9	0	4+1	0	0+0	0	1+0	0	0+3	0
37	DF	(Austria) AUT	Tim Trummer	11	0	4+7	0	0+0	0	0+0	0	0+0	0
38	MF	(Austria) AUT	Valentin Sulzbacher	7	0	5+1	0	0+0	0	0+0	0	1+0	0
39	DF	(Germany) GER	Leandro Morgalla	22	0	13+3	0	1+2	0	1+2	0	0+0	0
44	DF	(Austria) AUT	Jannik Schuster	1	0	0+1	0	0+0	0	0+0	0	0+0	0
45	FW	(Mali) MLI	Dorgeles Nene	49	14	24+6	12	3+1	0	8+4	2	3+0	0
49	MF	(Mali) MLI	Moussa Yeo	35	6	15+7	5	1+2	0	9+1	1	0+0	0
52	GK	(Austria) AUT	Christian Zawieschitzky	3	0	0+0	0	0+0	0	0+0	0	3+0	0
91	DF	(Poland) POL	Kamil Piątkowski	27	0	11+3	0	2+1	0	9+1	0	0+0	0
Player(s) who featured whilst on loan but returned to parent club during the season:
8	MF	(Spain) ESP	Stefan Bajcetic	19	0	6+6	0	1+0	0	1+5	0	0+0	0
Player(s) who featured but departed the club permanently during the season:
70	DF	(Bosnia and Herzegovina) BIH	Amar Dedić	25	0	9+3	0	2+0	0	11+0	0	0+0	0
Player(s) who signed in the club after the end of the Austrian Bundesliga 2024-25 season:
2	DF	(Denmark) DEN	Jacob Rasmussen	3	0	0+0	0	0+0	0	0+0	0	3+0	0
8	MF	(Japan) JPN	Sōta Kitano	1	0	0+0	0	0+0	0	0+0	0	0+1	0
13	DF	(Germany) GER	Frans Krätzig	3	0	0+0	0	0+0	0	0+0	0	3+0	0
22	DF	(Austria) AUT	Stefan Lainer	3	0	0+0	0	0+0	0	0+0	0	3+0	0
