= Daghim =

Daghim is an Arabic surname. Notable people with the surname include:

- Ahmed Daghim (born 2001), Palestinian footballer
- Adam Daghim (born 2005), Danish footballer
