= Dorgeles Nene =

Malian footballer (born 2002)

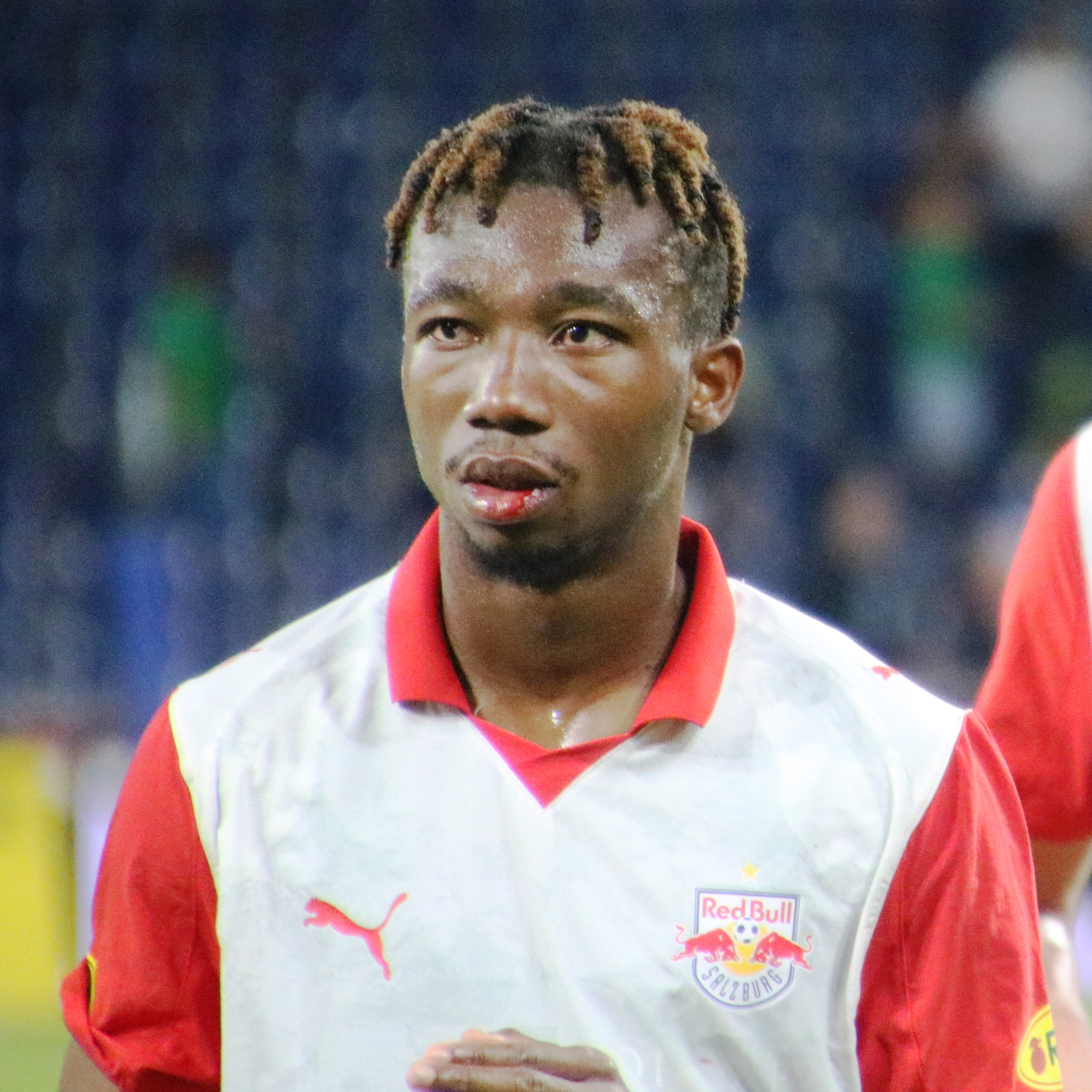
- Nene with Red Bull Salzburg in 2025

Personal information
- Full name: Dorgeles Nene
- Date of birth: 23 December 2002 (age 23)
- Place of birth: Kayes, Mali
- Height: 1.74 m (5 ft 9 in)
- Position: Winger

Team information
- Current team: Fenerbahçe
- Number: 45

Youth career
- FC Guidars

Senior career*
Years	Team	Apps	(Gls)
2021–2025	Red Bull Salzburg	57	(18)
2021–2022	→ FC Liefering (loan)	31	(10)
2022	→ SV Ried (loan)	14	(2)
2022–2023	→ Westerlo (loan)	35	(13)
2025–	Fenerbahçe	31	(10)

International career^{‡}
2022–	Mali	36	(11)
- * Club domestic league appearances and goals as of 31 October 2026 ‡ National team caps and goals as of 4 October 2026

Dorgeles Nene (born 23 December 2002) is a Malian professional footballer who plays as a winger for Süper Lig club Fenerbahçe and the Mali national team.

== Club career ==
Dorgeles started his career with FC Guidars and JMG Academy Bamako.

=== Red Bull Salzburg (2021–2025) ===
On 4 January 2021, Austrian club Red Bull Salzburg announced the signing of Dorgeles along with Mamady Diambou and Daouda Guindo. with the club until 31 May 2025.

On 29 July 2023, he made his debut with Red Bull Salzburg against Altach as a starter eleven in a 2023–24 Austrian Bundesliga match, 2-0 away win. On 24 October 2023, he made his continental debut in a UEFA Champions League match against Inter Milan, he played 18 mins as a substitute in 2-1 away defeat.

On 6 September 2024, Dorgeles extended his contract with Red Bull Salzburg until 2028. He finished his Red Bull Salzburg career with 22 goals and 15 assists across all competitions in 88 matches.

==== Loan years (2021–2023) ====
He, Mamady Diambou and Daouda Guindo signed professional contracts with Salzburg then became cooperation players at FC Liefering. He made his professional debut on 12 February 2021 in Liefering's 3–1 league win against Austria Lustenau. In 2021–22 season, he became one of the key players who took more responsibility on the field and scored eight goals in 16 matches in the 2. Liga.

After having attracted attention with his performances at Liefering, he was loaned to Austrian Bundesliga team SV Ried for the second half of the 2021–22 Austrian Bundesliga season. On 4 February 2022, he made his debut with the team in a 2-0 home win in Austrian Cup match against Austria Klagenfurt. On 12 February 2022, he made his Austrian Bundesliga debut against Wolfsberger AC.

On 30 June, he was loaned to Westerlo in Belgium for the 2022–23 season. On 7 August 2022, he made his Belgian Pro League debut as a substitute against Gent.

=== Fenerbahçe (2025–present) ===
On 19 August 2025, he signed a 5 year contract with Turkish Süper Lig club Fenerbahçe.

On 31 August 2025, he scored his first goal for the team in his Süper Lig debut against Gençlerbirliği in a 3-1 away win. On 9 November 2025, he scored two goals against Kayserispor in a 4-2 Süper Lig home win.

As of February 3, in his first season with the team, Nene has demonstrated his value to the team with a performance of 5 goals and 7 assists in 24 matches across all competitions. On March 17, he made his first hat-trick with the team in a 4-1 Süper Lig win against Gaziantep.

== International career ==
Dorgeles was born in Kayes, Mali to Ivorian parents who are originally from Yopougon, Abidjan. He debuted with the Mali national team in a 1–0 2022 World Cup qualification loss to Tunisia on 25 March 2022.

In the 2023 Africa Cup of Nations tournament held in Ivory Coast on February 3, 2024, he scored a goal in the 71st minute against Ivory Coast, but the Ivory Coast Team won the match 2-1 after extra time.

On 11 December 2025, Nene was called up to the Mali squad for the 2025 Africa Cup of Nations.

== Personal life ==
Dorgeles is the older brother of Nordsjælland and Ivory Coast U23 winger Levy Nene.

== Style of play ==
He is right-footed and predominately plays as a left winger but can operate on the right-wing as well as up front if needed.

== Career statistics ==
=== Club ===
As of match played 31 October 2026

Appearances and goals by club, season and competition
Club	Season	League			National cup (Note: Includes Austrian Cup, Belgian Cup and Turkish Cup)		Europe		Other		Total	
Club	Season	Division	Apps	Goals	Apps	Goals	Apps	Goals	Apps	Goals	Apps	Goals
Red Bull Salzburg	2020–21	Austrian Bundesliga	0	0	0	0	0	0	—		0	0
FC Liefering (loan)	2020–21	Austrian 2. Liga	15	2	—		—		—		15	2
FC Liefering (loan)	2021–22	Austrian 2. Liga	16	8	—		—		—		16	8
FC Liefering (loan)	Total		31	10	—		—		—		31	10
SV Ried (loan)	2021–22	Austrian Bundesliga	14	2	3	0	—		—		16	2
Westerlo (loan)	2022–23	Belgian Pro League	35	13	1	0	—		—		36	13
Red Bull Salzburg	2023–24	Austrian Bundesliga	24	5	2	0	4 (Note: Appearances in UEFA Champions League)	0	—		30	5
Red Bull Salzburg	2024–25	Austrian Bundesliga	30	13	4	0	12	2	3 (Note: Appearances in FIFA Club World Cup)	0	49	15
Red Bull Salzburg	2025–26	Austrian Bundesliga	3	0	1	1	4	1	—		8	2
Red Bull Salzburg	Total		57	18	7	1	20	3	3	0	87	22
Fenerbahçe	2025–26	Süper Lig	25	10	3	1	11 (Note: Appearances in UEFA Europa League)	0	1 (Note: Appearance in Turkish Super Cup)	0	39	11
Fenerbahçe	2026–27	Süper Lig	6	0	0	0	4	0	0	0	10	0
Fenerbahçe	Total		31	10	3	1	15	0	1	0	50	11
Career total			168	53	14	2	35	3	4	0	221	58

=== International ===
As of match played 4 October 2026

Appearances and goals by national team and year
National team	Year	Apps	Goals
Mali	2022	4	0
Mali	2023	7	2
Mali	2024	11	4
Mali	2025	9	3
Mali	2026	5	2
Total		36	11

Scores and results list Mali's goal tally first, score column indicates score after each Dorgeles goal.

List of international goals scored by Dorgeles Nene
No.	Date	Venue	Opponent	Score	Result	Competition
1	18 June 2023	Stade Alphonse Massemba-Débat, Brazzaville, Congo	Congo	2–0	2–0	2023 Africa Cup of Nations qualification
2	8 September 2023	26 March Stadium, Bamako, Mali	South Sudan	4–0	4–0	2023 Africa Cup of Nations qualification
3	3 February 2024	Bouaké Stadium, Bouaké, Ivory Coast	Ivory Coast	1–0	1–2 (a.e.t.)	2023 Africa Cup of Nations
4	19 November 2024	Stade du 26 Mars, Bamako, Mali	Eswatini	2–0	6–0	2025 Africa Cup of Nations qualification
5	19 November 2024	Stade du 26 Mars, Bamako, Mali	Eswatini	3–0	6–0	2025 Africa Cup of Nations qualification
6	19 November 2024	Stade du 26 Mars, Bamako, Mali	Eswatini	5–0	6–0	2025 Africa Cup of Nations qualification
7	20 March 2025	Berkane Municipal Stadium, Berkane, Morocco	Comoros	1–0	3–0	2026 FIFA World Cup qualification
8	4 September 2025	Berkane Municipal Stadium, Berkane, Morocco	Comoros	1–0	3–0	2026 FIFA World Cup qualification
9	12 October 2025	26 March Stadium, Bamako, Mali	Madagascar	2–0	4–1	2026 FIFA World Cup qualification
10	25 September 2026	26 March Stadium, Bamako, Mali	Cape Verde	2–1	3–1	2027 Africa Cup of Nations qualification
11	25 September 2026	26 March Stadium, Bamako, Mali	Cape Verde	3–1	3–1	2027 Africa Cup of Nations qualification

== Honours ==
Fenerbahçe

- Turkish Super Cup: 2025
