= Konstantin Schopp =

Austrian footballer (born 2005

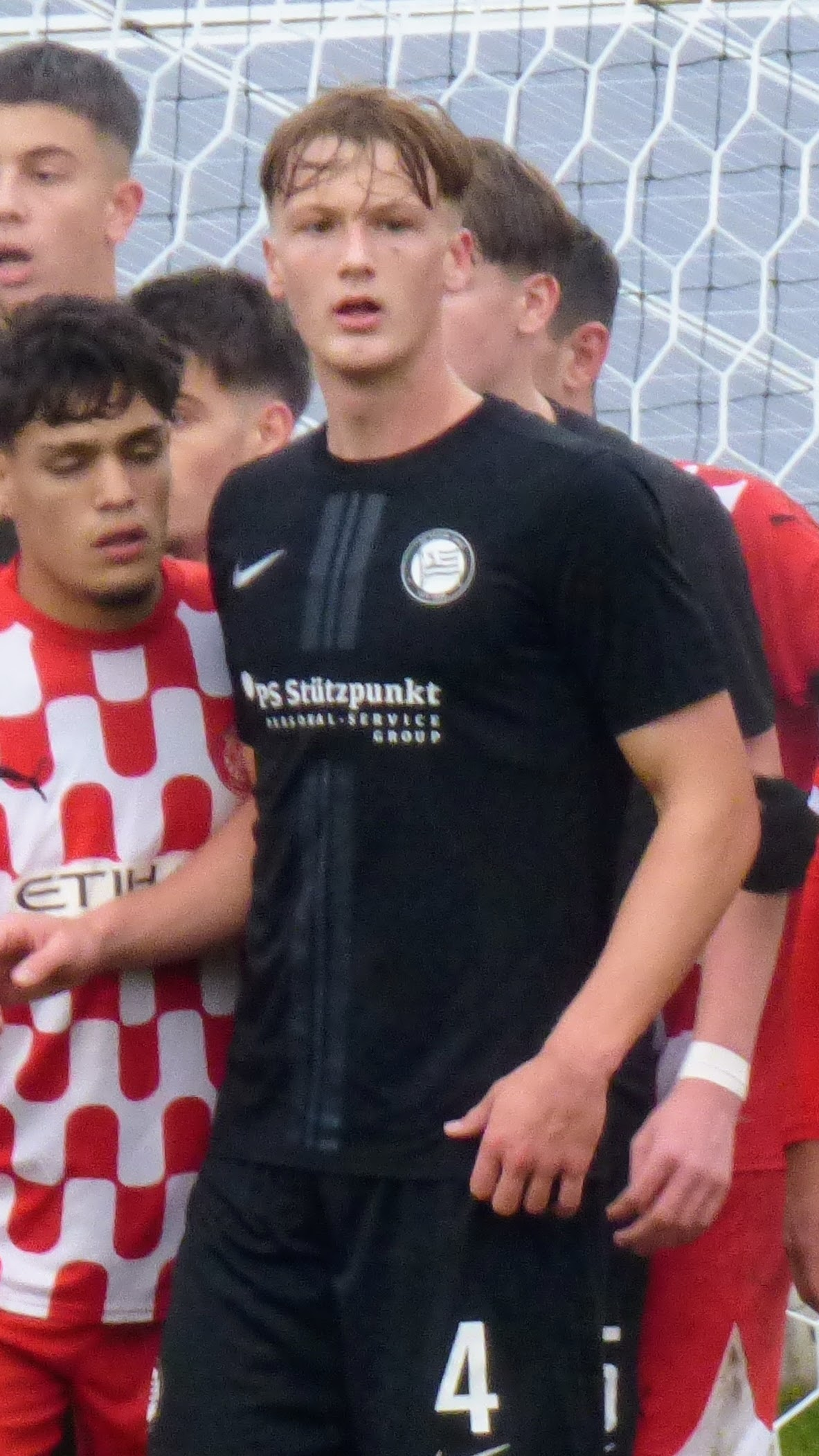

Personal information
- Date of birth: 30 December 2005 (age 20)
- Place of birth: Salzburg, Austria
- Height: 1.95 m (6 ft 5 in)
- Position: Defender

Team information
- Current team: TSV Hartberg (on loan from Mainz 05)
- Number: 27

Youth career
- –2024: Sturm Graz

Senior career*
Years	Team	Apps	(Gls)
2023–2025	Sturm Graz II	42	(3)
2024–2025	Sturm Graz	1	(0)
2025–	Mainz 05	0	(0)
2025–	Mainz 05 II	11	(1)
2026–	→ TSV Hartberg (loan)	7	(0)

International career^{‡}
2025–	Austria U21	3	(0)
- * Club domestic league appearances and goals as of 10 June 2026 ‡ National team caps and goals as of 10 June 2025

Konstantin Schopp (born 30 December 2005) is an Austrian professional footballer who plays as a defender for Austrian Bundesliga club TSV Hartberg, on loan from Bundesliga club Mainz 05.

== Early life ==
Schopp was born on 30 December 2005 in Salzburg, Austria. A native of the city, he is the son of Austria international Markus Schopp.

== Club career ==
As a youth player, Schopp joined the youth academy of Austrian side Sturm Graz and was promoted to the club's reserve team in 2023, where he made forty-eight league appearances and scored three goals. Ahead of the 2024–25 season, he was promoted to their first team, where he made one league appearance and scored zero goals and helped them win the league title. On 22 October 2024, he debuted for them during a 0–2 away loss to Sporting CP in the UEFA Champions League.

On 14 January 2026, Schopp returned to Austria and joined TSV Hartberg on loan.

== International career ==
Schopp is an Austria youth international. On 21 March 2025, he debuted for the Austria national under-21 football team during a 2–0 away friendly win over the Switzerland national under-21 football team.
