= Oliver Lukić =

Croatian footballer (born 2006)

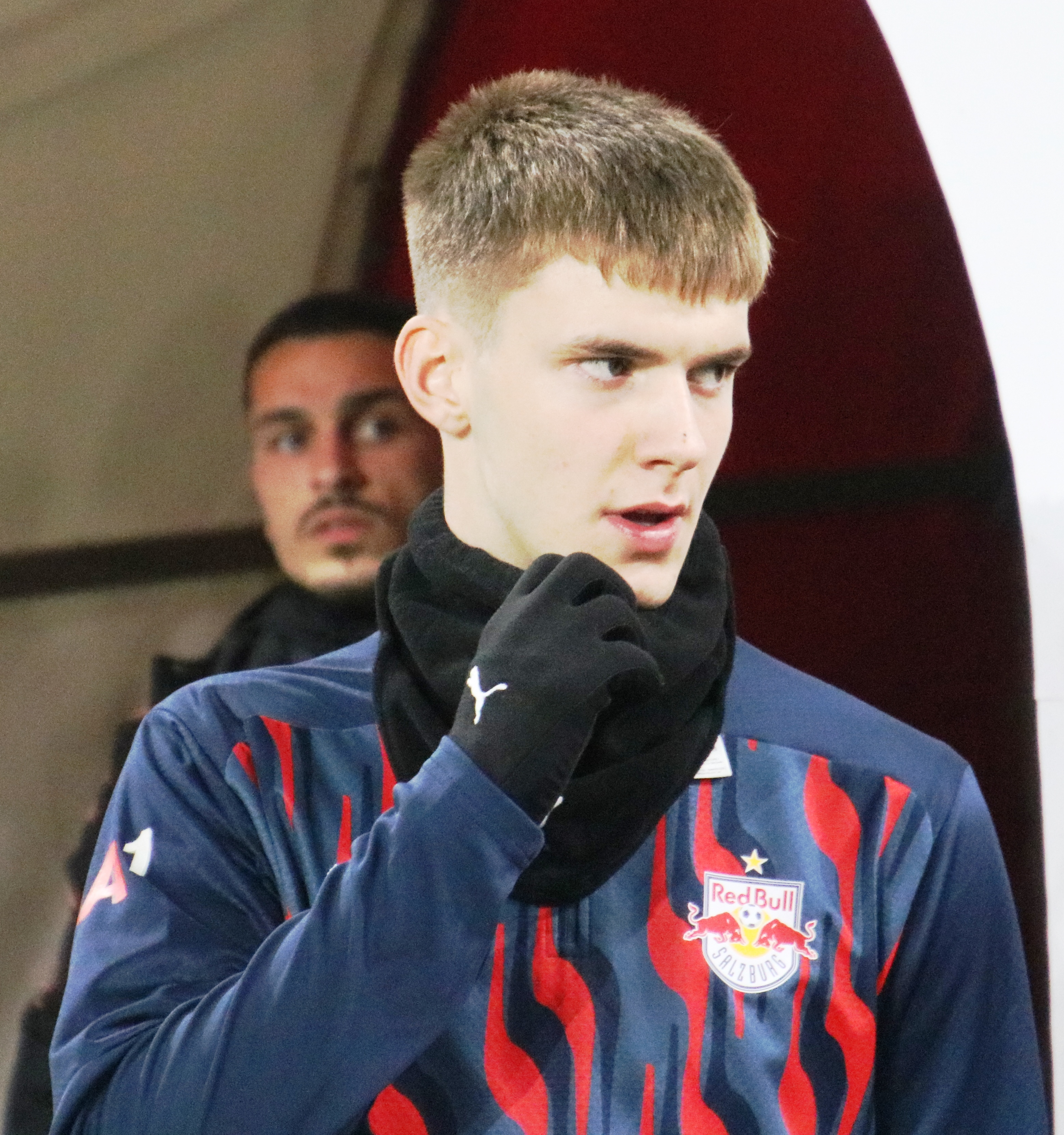
- Lukić with Red Bull Salzburg in 2025

Personal information
- Date of birth: 22 September 2006 (age 20)
- Place of birth: Vienna, Austria
- Height: 1.88 m (6 ft 2 in)
- Position: Midfielder

Team information
- Current team: TSV Hartberg (on loan from Red Bull Salzburg)
- Number: 10

Youth career
- 2012–2022: Austria Wien
- 2022–2023: Red Bull Salzburg

Senior career*
Years	Team	Apps	(Gls)
2023–	FC Liefering	45	(4)
2024–	Red Bull Salzburg	3	(0)
2026–	→ TSV Hartberg (loan)	2	(0)

International career^{‡}
2021–2022	Austria U16	5	(2)
2022	Austria U17	5	(1)
2023	Austria U18	3	(1)
2024	Croatia U19	6	(4)
- * Club domestic league appearances and goals as of 16 August 2026 ‡ National team caps and goals as of 19 November 2024

Oliver Lukić (born 22 September 2006) is a professional footballer who plays as a midfielder for Austrian Bundesliga club TSV Hartberg, on loan from Red Bull Salzburg. Born in Austria, which he previously represented at youth levels, he switched to represent Croatia at the under-19 level in 2024.

On 11 October 2023, he was named by English newspaper The Guardian as one of the best players born in 2006 worldwide.

== Club career ==
Lukić started his career at Austria Wien in 2012, and worked his way up their youth categories. In the summer 2022 he moved to the academy of Red Bull Salzburg. On 19 May 2023, he made his senior and professional debut for Red Bull Salzburg's satellite team FC Liefering as a substitute in a 1–1 2nd division tie with SV Lafnitz. On 20 July 2023, he signed his first professional contract with Red Bull Salzburg until 2026, and extended his stay with Liefering for the 2023–24 season.

On 25 July 2026, Lukić moved to fellow Austrian Bundesliga club TSV Hartberg, on loan for the 2026–27 season.

== International career ==
Born in Austria, Lukić was born to Croatian parents who emigrated from Bosnia and Herzegovina. He was a youth international for Austria, having played up to the Austria U18s. In 2023, he lodged a FIFA nationality change request in order to be eligible to represent Croatia.

== Career statistics ==
As of match played 6 April 2026

Appearances and goals by club, season and competition
Club	Season	League			Austrian Cup		Europe		Other		Total	
Club	Season	Division	Apps	Goals	Apps	Goals	Apps	Goals	Apps	Goals	Apps	Goals
Liefering	2022–23	2. Liga	3	0	0	0	—		—		3	0
Liefering	2023–24	2. Liga	8	0	0	0	—		—		8	0
Liefering	2024–25	2. Liga	19	2	0	0	—		—		19	2
Liefering	2025–26	2. Liga	15	2	0	0	—		—		15	2
Liefering	Total		45	4	0	0	—		—		45	4
Red Bull Salzburg	2024–25	Austrian Bundesliga	0	0	1	0	1 (Note: Appearance in UEFA Champions League)	0	0	0	2	0
Red Bull Salzburg	2025–26	Austrian Bundesliga	3	0	1	0	3 (Note: Appearances in UEFA Europa League)	0	—		7	0
Red Bull Salzburg	Total		3	0	2	0	4	0	0	0	9	0
Career total			48	4	2	0	4	0	0	0	54	4
