= Adam Daghim =

Danish footballer (born 2005)

- Daghim with Red Bull Salzburg in 2025

Personal information
- Date of birth: 28 September 2005 (age 21)
- Place of birth: Vanløse, Denmark
- Height: 1.89 m (6 ft 2 in)
- Positions: Right winger; forward

Team information
- Current team: TSG Hoffenheim
- Number: 14

Youth career
- FA 2000
- –2018: KB
- 2018–2021: Copenhagen
- 2021–2022: AGF

Senior career*
Years	Team	Apps	(Gls)
2022–2023	AGF	9	(0)
2023–2026	Red Bull Salzburg	33	(2)
2023–2024	→ FC Liefering (loan)	22	(6)
2025–2026	→ VfL Wolfsburg (loan)	27	(2)
2026–	TSG Hoffenheim	8	(2)

International career^{‡}
2023	Denmark U18	5	(0)
2023–2024	Denmark U19	10	(2)
2024–	Denmark U21	8	(2)
2026–	Denmark	4	(0)
- * Club domestic league appearances and goals as of 31 October 2026 ‡ National team caps and goals as of 1 October 2026

Adam Daghim (Arabic: آدم دغيم; born 28 September 2005) is a Danish professional footballer who plays as a right winger or forward for Bundesliga club TSG Hoffenheim and the Denmark national team. He is the younger brother of fellow professional footballer Ahmed Daghim.

== Early life ==
Daghim was born on 28 September 2005 in Vanløse, a district of Copenhagen. His father is a Lebanese-born Palestinian originally from the village of Al-Kabri, while his mother is Libyan. He is the younger brother of professional footballer Ahmed Daghim, five years his senior and also a natural winger, who introduced him to organised football from an early age. Daghim has described having had his own "demons" early in his career, struggling when things did not go his way on the pitch, and cited his father's advice—"You won't go far if you don't conquer yourself"—as a guiding influence in overcoming them.

In 2021, his brother Ahmed suffered a cardiac episode and collapsed during a match while Adam was warming up for a youth fixture in Esbjerg. Learning of it ten minutes before kick-off, Adam chose to play the game, his side winning 2–1 with his two assists, before travelling to the hospital. He described his family's response as characteristically forward-looking: "We must not dwell too much in the past. We must always look forward."

== Club career ==
=== Youth career ===
Both Daghim brothers began playing football together at FA 2000, a club in Frederiksberg. As Adam's talent became apparent the brothers progressed to KB, where training became more structured and competitive. He was subsequently recruited into the FC Copenhagen elite youth academy, where scouts were already familiar with the family through Ahmed's prior time at the club. His father and elder brother would compile video clips of his performances for the family to review together on the living room sofa, and Adam later credited his brother with repeatedly telling him that "with the right attitude and hard work, you can achieve incredible things". When he found his playing time limited in Copenhagen's first-year under-17 squad, it opened the opportunity to join AGF, and he relocated to Aarhus in 2021, moving into a dormitory near the club's training ground at Fredensvang.

=== AGF ===
Daghim became the youngest AGF player to appear in the Danish Superliga when he made his debut on 3 April 2022, coming on as a substitute for the final 20 minutes in a 0–0 draw with Vejle. In the same month, he signed his first professional contract with the club.

=== Red Bull Salzburg ===
On 30 August 2023, Daghim joined Red Bull Salzburg for a reported fee of approximately €3 million on an initial contract until June 2026. He was initially deployed as a cooperation player at Salzburg's affiliate club FC Liefering in the Austrian 2. Liga, where he scored four goals and provided three assists in nine league appearances in the autumn of 2023, and added a further four goals and two assists in six appearances in the UEFA Youth League, in which Salzburg won their group ahead of Benfica, Real Sociedad and Inter Milan. On 18 January 2024, Salzburg extended his contract until June 2028 ahead of schedule, with sporting director Bernhard Seonbuchner saying the club expected "a great deal" from him.

Daghim was promoted to the Red Bull Salzburg first team for the 2024–25 season, during which he scored in the Champions League qualifying round against Dynamo Kyiv to help secure Salzburg's place in the league phase. On 29 January 2025, in a 4–1 home defeat by Atlético Madrid, he scored a stoppage-time consolation—his first goal in the Champions League proper. That summer Daghim also represented Salzburg at the 2025 FIFA Club World Cup.

==== Loan to VfL Wolfsburg ====
On 1 September 2025, Daghim joined VfL Wolfsburg on a one-year loan that included an option to buy, reported by kicker to be worth €13 million. Sporting director Sebastian Schindzielorz described him as "a young offensive talent with a lot of potential" whose pace made him "particularly valuable for our attack".

Daghim scored twice and provided three assists in the Bundesliga during a season interrupted by a back injury that sidelined him between November and December 2025. The team finished the season in the relegation play-off position and lost the play-off to SC Paderborn on penalties, dropping to the 2. Bundesliga; among those relegated with Daghim were the Denmark internationals Joakim Mæhle, Christian Eriksen and Jonas Wind. Due to return to Salzburg at the end of the loan, Daghim said in June 2026 that he did not intend to remain in Austria and was seeking a move to one of Europe's top-five leagues.

=== Hoffenheim ===
On 2 August 2026, Daghim was announced at TSG Hoffenheim.

== International career ==
Daghim has represented Denmark at under-18, under-19 and under-21 level. He first appeared for the under-18 team in 2022 and progressed to the under-21s in 2024.

On 31 May 2026, Daghim was called up to the senior Denmark squad by manager Brian Riemer as a replacement for the injured Gustav Isaksen. He made his senior debut on 3 June, starting on the right wing in a 0–0 friendly draw with DR Congo in Liège. Reviewing his performance, the former international and pundit Morten Bruun wrote that Daghim had begun brightly but faded after the break, and judged that he was not yet at international level despite his potential.

== Career statistics ==
=== Club ===
As of match played 31 October 2026

Appearances and goals by club, season and competition
Club	Season	League			National cup (Note: Includes Danish Cup, Austrian Cup, DFB-Pokal)		Europe		Other		Total	
Club	Season	Division	Apps	Goals	Apps	Goals	Apps	Goals	Apps	Goals	Apps	Goals
AGF	2021–22	Danish Superliga	3	0	0	0	—		—		3	0
AGF	2022–23	Danish Superliga	3	0	1	0	—		—		4	0
AGF	2023–24	Danish Superliga	3	0	—		1 (Note: Appearance in UEFA Europa Conference League)	0	—		4	0
AGF	Total		9	0	1	0	1	0	—		11	0
Red Bull Salzburg	2023–24	Austrian Bundesliga	1	0	0	0	0	0	—		1	0
Red Bull Salzburg	2024–25	Austrian Bundesliga	29	2	4	2	11 (Note: Appearances in UEFA Champions League)	2	3 (Note: Appearances in FIFA Club World Cup)	0	47	6
Red Bull Salzburg	2025–26	Austrian Bundesliga	3	0	2	0	3	0	—		8	0
Red Bull Salzburg	2026–27	Austrian Bundesliga	0	0	1	0	—		—		1	0
Red Bull Salzburg	Total		33	2	7	2	14	2	3	0	57	6
FC Liefering (loan)	2023–24	Austrian 2. Liga	22	6	0	0	—		—		22	6
VfL Wolfsburg (loan)	2025–26	Bundesliga	27	2	1	0	—		2 (Note: Appearances in Bundesliga relegation play-offs)	0	30	2
TSG Hoffenheim	2026–27	Bundesliga	8	2	2	0	3 (Note: Appearances in UEFA Europa League)	1	—		13	3
Career total			99	12	11	2	18	3	5	0	134	17

=== International ===
As of match played 1 October 2026

Appearances and goals by national team and year
National team	Year	Apps	Goals
Denmark	2026	4	0
Total		4	0
