= Ahmed Daghim =

Palestine footballer (born 2001)

Personal information
- Full name: Ahmed Daghim
- Date of birth: 7 April 2001 (age 25)
- Place of birth: Copenhagen, Denmark
- Height: 1.86 m (6 ft 1 in)
- Position: Winger

Youth career
- Humlebæk Boldklub
- FA 2000
- B.93
- 2012–2019: Copenhagen

Senior career*
Years	Team	Apps	(Gls)
2019–2021	Copenhagen	3	(0)
2020	→ HamKam (loan)	8	(0)
2021–2022	Kolding	21	(0)
2022–2025	B.93	51	(5)

International career
2018–2019	Denmark U18	5	(3)
2019–2020	Denmark U19	7	(2)
2022–2024	Palestine U23	4	(1)
- * Club domestic league appearances and goals as of 29 May 2025

Ahmed Daghim (Arabic: أحمد دغيم; born 7 April 2001) is a professional footballer who plays as winger. Born in Denmark, he has represented Palestine most recently at youth level. He is the older brother of fellow professional footballer Adam Daghim.

== Club career ==
=== Copenhagen ===
Daghim first played in Humlebæk Boldklub, before moving to Frederiksberg-based club FA 2000 and later B.93 in the Copenhagen neighbourhood of Østerbro, before joining the football school of FC Copenhagen in 2012. He made his senior debut on 27 September 2018 in a Danish Cup match against Viby IF, which ended in a 0–3 win for Copenhagen. In the match, he came on as a substitute in the 76th minute for Pieros Sotiriou. On 10 February 2019, Daghim made his Danish Superliga debut in a 6–1 win over OB. Although he was only utilised twice in the championship round in the following years, he still won the Danish league title with Copenhagen.

==== Loan to HamKam ====
On 20 December 2019, Copenhagen confirmed that Daghim had extended his contract until 2023 and would join Norwegian club HamKam on loan for 2020. He made his debut for the club on 3 July 2020 in a 2–3 loss to Kongsvinger, after football activities had been resumed as part of the COVID-19 pandemic. Later that week, he made his first start in a 2–0 loss to Lillestrøm. He returned to Copenhagen after the season, as HamKam finished in a disappointing 9th place of the second-tier Norwegian First Division.

=== Kolding ===
Daghim signed a two-and-a-half-year contract with Danish second-tier club Kolding IF on 21 January 2021. Following the move, Copenhagen sporting director William Kvist stated: "Ahmed is a talented player, but he still had a long way to go before he would become a candidate for permanent playing time with us." Daghim made his debut for the club on 12 February, coming on as a second-half substitute for fellow January-signing Matthias Verreth in a league match against Helsingør.

On 21 August, during Kolding's 2nd Division match against FA 2000 at the Frederiksberg Idrætspark in Frederiksberg, Daghim collapsed while warming up shortly after the beginning of the second half. A doctor was present among the spectators, who oversaw Daghim, before an ambulance transported him to Bispebjerg Hospital. The match was suspended following the incident, and Kolding IF wrote on their official Twitter account that Daghim was "fine under the circumstances".

His contract got terminated by request on 5 July 2022.

=== B.93 ===
On 8 July 2022, Daghim signed for Danish 2nd Division club B.93. He made his debut for the club on 29 July, coming on as a substitute in a first-round Danish Cup loss to Roskilde. On 27 August, he scored his first goal for 93, helping the team to a 3–2 home victory against his former club, Kolding, with an impressive goal from outside the box.

He left the club in June 2025, as his contract expired.

== International career ==
Born in Denmark, Daghim is of Palestinian descent. He is a youth international for Denmark. In November 2022, he was selected for the Palestine under-23s. He made his debut for Palestine U23 on 19 November 2022 in a friendly against Kuwait U23, scoring on a penalty kick on his debut in a 2–1 win.

== Career statistics ==
As of match played 5 August 2023

Appearances and goals by club, season and competition
Club	Season	League			National cup		Europe		Other		Total	
Club	Season	Division	Apps	Goals	Apps	Goals	Apps	Goals	Apps	Goals	Apps	Goals
Copenhagen	2018–19	Danish Superliga	3	0	1	0	—		—		4	0
Copenhagen	2019–20	Danish Superliga	0	0	0	0	1 (Note: Appearance in UEFA Champions League)	0	—		1	0
Copenhagen	Total		3	0	1	0	1	0	—		5	0
HamKam (loan)	2020	Norwegian First Division	8	0	—		—		—		8	0
Kolding	2020–21	Danish 1st Division	15	0	—		—		—		15	0
Kolding	2021–22	Danish 2nd Division	6	0	2	1	—		—		8	1
Kolding	Total		21	0	2	1	—		—		23	1
B.93	2022–23	Danish 2nd Division	26	4	1	0	—		—		27	4
B.93	2023–24	Danish 1st Division	3	0	0	0	—		—		3	0
B.93	Total		29	4	1	0	—		—		30	4
Career total			61	4	4	1	1	0	0	0	66	5

== Honours ==
Copenhagen

- Danish Superliga: 2018–19
