= Alexander Briedl =

Austrian footballer (born 2002)

Personal information
- Date of birth: 21 April 2002 (age 24)
- Place of birth: Salzburg, Austria
- Height: 1.80 m (5 ft 11 in)
- Position: Midfielder

Team information
- Current team: Aberdeen
- Number: 10

Youth career
- –2020: Red Bull Salzburg

Senior career*
Years	Team	Apps	(Gls)
2020	Red Bull Salzburg	0	(0)
2020	→ USK Anif (loan)		
2021–2022	SV Horn	33	(0)
2022–2026	FC Blau-Weiß Linz	93	(3)
2023	→ SV Wallern (loan)	5	(0)
2026–	Aberdeen	0	(0)

International career^{‡}
2024	Austria U21	2	(0)
- * Club domestic league appearances and goals as of 16 May 2026 ‡ National team caps and goals as of 9 September 2024

Alexander Briedl (born 21 April 2002) is an Austrian professional footballer who plays as a midfielder for Aberdeen.

== Club career ==
As a youth player, Briedl joined the youth academy of Austrian side Red Bull Salzburg and was promoted to the club's senior team in 2020, where he made zero league appearances and scored zero goals. The same year, he was sent on loan to Austrian side USK Anif. Following his stint there, he signed for Austrian side SV Horn in 2021, where he made thirty-three league appearances and scored zero goals.

One year later, he signed for Austrian side FC Blau-Weiß Linz, where he made ninety-three league appearances and scored three goals and helped the club achieve promotion from the second tier to the top flight. Austrian news website Laola1 wrote in 2024 that he "made an immediate impact in the Bundesliga and has been a regular starter" while playing for them. During the summer of 2023, he was sent on loan to Austrian side SV Wallern, where he made five league ppearances and scored zero goals. Ahead of the 2026–27 season, he signed for Scottish side Aberdeen.

== International career ==
Briedl is an Austria youth international. On 7 June 2024, he debuted for the Austria national under-21 football team during a 5–0 home friendly win over the Scotland national under-21 football team.

== Style of play ==
Briedl plays as a midfielder. Left-footed, he is known for his pressing ability.
