= Lucho (footballer, born 2003) =

Colombian footballer

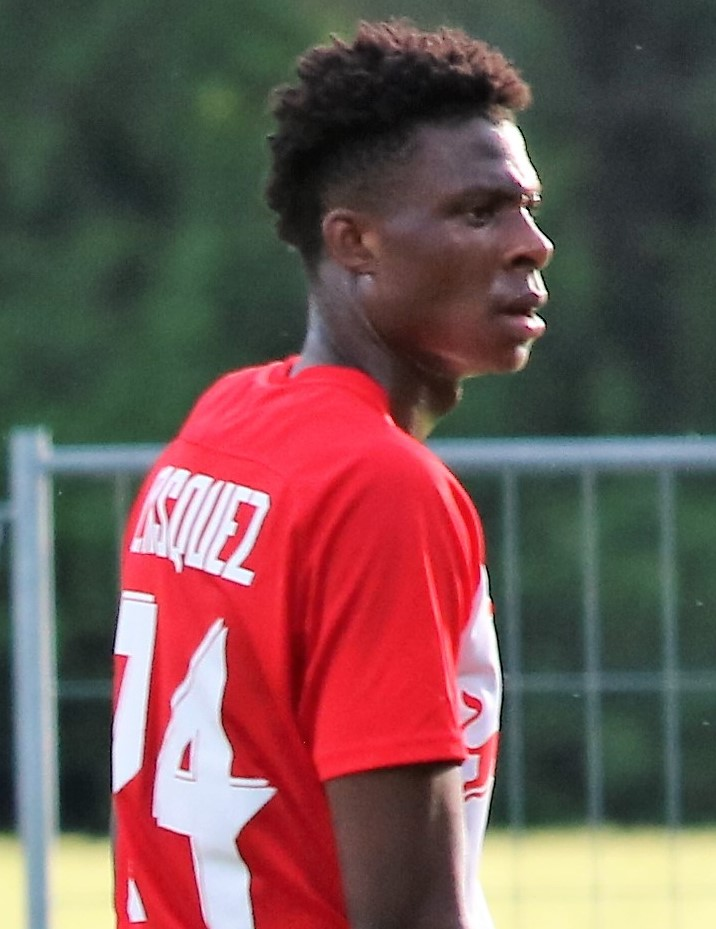

Personal information
- Full name: Luis Fernando Vásquez Díaz
- Date of birth: 3 January 2003 (age 23)
- Place of birth: Guachené, Colombia
- Height: 1.92 m (6 ft 4 in)
- Position: Defender

Team information
- Current team: Skënderbeu Korçë
- Number: 3

Youth career
- –2021: AAF Popayán

Senior career*
Years	Team	Apps	(Gls)
2021–2024	Red Bull Salzburg	0	(0)
2021	→ SV Horn (loan)	11	(1)
2021–2022	→ FC Liefering (loan)	0	(0)
2022–2024	→ Kapfenberger SV (loan)	35	(1)
2024–	Skënderbeu Korçë	1	(0)
- * Club domestic league appearances and goals as of 11 September 21024

Luis Fernando Vásquez Díaz (born 3 January 2003), commonly known as Lucho, is a Colombian professional footballer who plays as a defender for Kategoria Superiore club Skënderbeu Korçë.

== Career statistics ==
=== Club ===
As of 28 May 2021.

Club	Season	League			Cup		Continental		Other		Total	
Club	Season	Division	Apps	Goals	Apps	Goals	Apps	Goals	Apps	Goals	Apps	Goals
Red Bull Salzburg	2020–21	Bundesliga	0	0	0	0	0	0	0	0	0	0
SV Horn (loan)	2020–21	2. Liga	11	1	0	0	–		0	0	11	1
Career total			11	1	0	0	0	0	0	0	11	1
