= Magnus Dalpiaz =

Austrian footballer (born 2007)

Personal information
- Date of birth: 20 February 2007 (age 19)
- Place of birth: Innsbruck, Austria
- Height: 1.85 m (6 ft 1 in)
- Position: Defender

Team information
- Current team: TSV Hartberg (on loan from Bayern Munich II)
- Number: 16

Youth career
- 2011–2013: TSV Neubeuern
- 2013–2015: TSV Brannenburg
- 2016–2019: SpVgg Unterhaching
- 2019–2025: Bayern Munich
- 2026: → AC Milan (loan)

Senior career*
Years	Team	Apps	(Gls)
2025–	Bayern Munich II	22	(0)
2026	→ Milan Futuro (res.) (loan)	10	(0)
2026–	→ TSV Hartberg (loan)	9	(1)

International career^{‡}
2022–2023	Austria U16	5	(0)
2023–2024	Austria U17	12	(0)
2024–2025	Austria U18	8	(0)
2025–	Austria U19	8	(0)
- * Club domestic league appearances and goals as of 8 November 2026 ‡ National team caps and goals as of 31 March 2026

Magnus Dalpiaz (born 20 February 2007) is an Austrian professional footballer who plays as a defender for Austrian Bundesliga club TSV Hartberg, on loan from Regionalliga Bayern club Bayern Munich II. Although Dalpiaz primarily plays as a right-back, he can also play as a left-back and centre-back. He is an Austrian youth international.

== Club career ==
=== Bayern Munich ===
As a youth player, Dalpiaz played for TSV Neubeuern and TSV Brannenburg, before joining the youth academy of SpVgg Unterhaching in 2016. Following his stint there, he joined the youth academy of Bundesliga side Bayern Munich in 2019. Dalpiaz made five appearances for Bayern Munich II during the 2024–25 season in the Regionalliga Bayern.

On early 2025, he extended his contract with Bayern Munich until 2028.

Dalpiaz was one of the players that were called up by Bayern Munich head coach Vincent Kompany, for the 2025 pre-season matches against Ligue 1 club Lyon, Premier League club Tottenham Hotspur, and Swiss Super League club Grasshopper, on 2, 7, and 12 August 2025, respectively. He was a starter for the match against Grasshopper, which Bayern Munich won 2–1.

==== Loan to AC Milan ====
On 2 February 2026, Dalpiaz moved to Italy and joined Serie A club AC Milan on a six-month loan until the end of the season, with the option to make the move permanent. He was initially assigned to their reserve team Milan Futuro.

Dalpiaz made his debut with Milan Futuro on 8 February 2026, substituting Mattia Cappelletti at the 25th minute of a 1–0 home loss Serie D match against Virtus CiseranoBergamo. During his loan-spell he went on to feature with the AC Milan Primavera, starting and playing full-time during a 2–0 home loss Campionato Primavera 1 match against the Cremonese Primavera, on 5 March 2026.

==== Loan to TSV Hartberg ====
On 24 June 2026, Dalpiaz returned to his homeland and moved to Austrian Bundesliga club TSV Hartberg on a one-year loan, ahead of the 2026–27 season.

== International career ==
Dalpiaz is an Austria youth international, having featured with the under-16, under-17, under-18 and under-19 teams.

== Career statistics ==
=== Club ===
As of match played 16 October 2026

Appearances and goals by club, season and competition
Club	Season	League			National cup (Note: Includes Austrian Cup)		Other		Total	
Club	Season	Division	Apps	Goals	Apps	Goals	Apps	Goals	Apps	Goals
Bayern Munich II	2024–25	Regionalliga Bayern	5	0	—		—		5	0
Bayern Munich II	2025–26	Regionalliga Bayern	17	0	—		—		17	0
Bayern Munich II	Total		22	0	—		—		22	0
Milan Futuro (loan)	2025–26	Serie D	10	0	—		0	0	10	0
Milan Futuro (loan)	Total		10	0	—		0	0	10	0
TSV Hartberg (loan)	2026–27	Austrian Bundesliga	6	1	2	1	0	0	8	2
TSV Hartberg (loan)	Total		6	1	2	1	0	0	8	2
Career total			38	1	2	1	0	0	40	2
