= Lukas Spendlhofer =

Austrian footballer

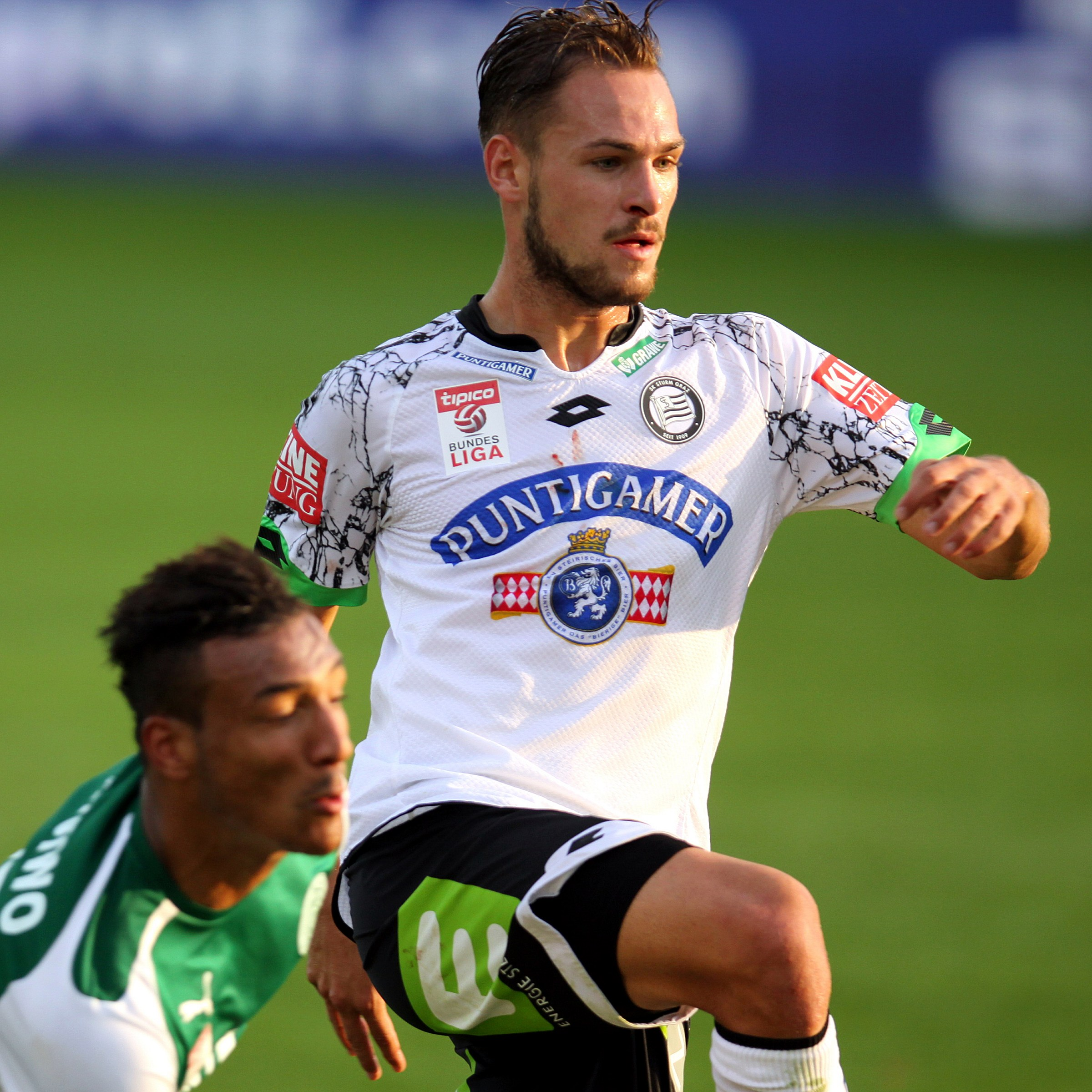
- Spendlhofer with Sturm Graz

Personal information
- Date of birth: 2 June 1993 (age 33)
- Place of birth: Neunkirchen, Austria
- Height: 1.87 m (6 ft 2 in)
- Position: Defender

Team information
- Current team: TSV Hartberg
- Number: 19

Youth career
- Inter Milan

Senior career*
Years	Team	Apps	(Gls)
2013–2015	Inter Milan	1	(0)
2013–2014	→ Varese (loan)	3	(0)
2014–2015	→ Sturm Graz (loan)	31	(2)
2015–2020	Sturm Graz	133	(4)
2020–2022	Ascoli	11	(0)
2021	→ Bnei Sakhnin (loan)	11	(0)
2022–2023	Maccabi Bnei Reineh	32	(2)
2023–2025	Bruk-Bet Termalica	54	(2)
2025–	TSV Hartberg	28	(2)

International career
2009–2010	Austria U18	2	(1)
2010–2011	Austria U19	10	(0)
2011–2014	Austria U21	18	(1)
- * Club domestic league appearances and goals as of 10 June 2026

Lukas Spendlhofer (born 2 June 1993) is an Austrian professional footballer who plays as a defender for Austrian Bundesliga club TSV Hartberg.

== Club career ==
Spendlhofer is a youth product of Italian club Inter Milan, and made his debut in Serie A with the senior team on 12 May 2013, during a match against Genoa, which ended without goals.

On 9 May 2018, he played as Sturm Graz best Red Bull Salzburg in extra time to win the 2017–18 Austrian Cup.

On 2 October 2020, Spendlhofer returned to Italy and signed a two-year contract with Ascoli.

On 9 February 2021, he joined Israeli Premier League side Bnei Sakhnin on loan for the rest of the season.

In June 2022, Spendlhofer signed for Maccabi Bnei Reineh.

On 24 August 2023, he signed a two-year contract with Polish I liga side Bruk-Bet Termalica Nieciecza.

On 1 July 2025, Spendlhofer returned to Austria to join TSV Hartberg on a one-year deal.

== Honours ==
Sturm Graz

- Austrian Cup: 2017–18
