= Benjamin Markuš =

Slovenian footballer (born 2001)

Personal information
- Date of birth: 30 January 2001 (age 25)
- Height: 1.85 m (6 ft 1 in)
- Position: Defensive midfielder

Team information
- Current team: TSV Hartberg
- Number: 4

Youth career
- –2015: Olimpija Ljubljana
- 2015–2020: Domžale

Senior career*
Years	Team	Apps	(Gls)
2020–2024	Domžale	111	(4)
2020	→ Dob (loan)	12	(1)
2024–	TSV Hartberg	62	(0)

International career
2017	Slovenia U16	1	(0)
2019–2020	Slovenia U19	13	(0)
2021–2022	Slovenia U21	6	(0)
- * Club domestic league appearances and goals as of 1 June 2026

Benjamin Markuš (born 30 January 2001) is a Slovenian professional footballer who plays as a midfielder for Austrian Bundesliga club TSV Hartberg.
