= Mamady Diambou =

Malian footballer (born 2002)

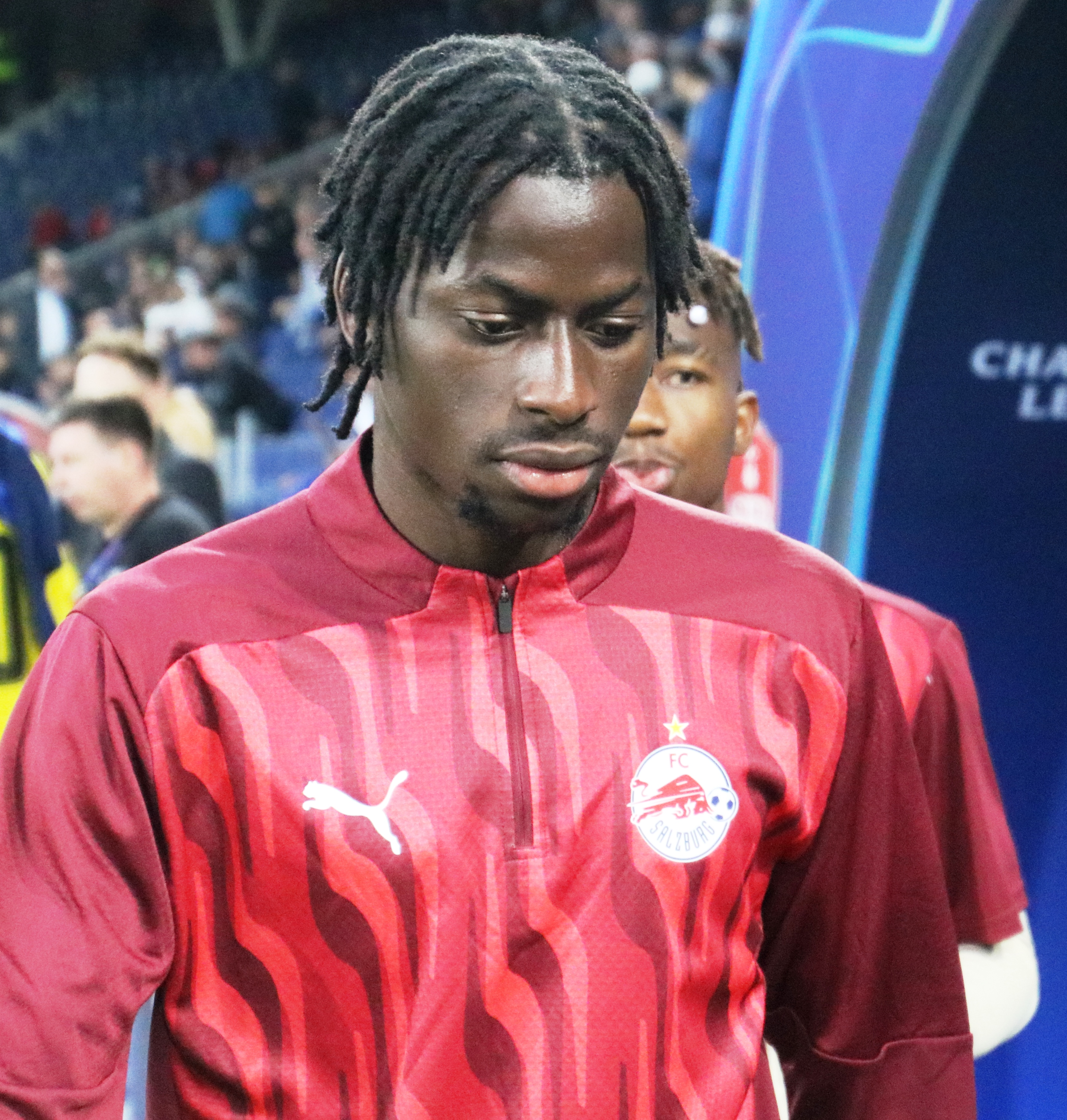
- Diambou with Red Bull Salzburg in 2024

Personal information
- Date of birth: 11 November 2002 (age 24)
- Place of birth: Bamako, Mali
- Height: 1.76 m (5 ft 9 in)
- Position: Defensive midfielder

Team information
- Current team: Brest
- Number: 6

Youth career
- –2021: Guidars FC

Senior career*
Years	Team	Apps	(Gls)
2021–2026	Red Bull Salzburg	55	(0)
2021–2022	→ FC Liefering (loan)	32	(3)
2023	→ Luzern (loan)	13	(0)
2026–	Brest	0	(0)

International career^{‡}
2023–	Mali U23	4	(1)
2024–	Mali	1	(0)
- * Club domestic league appearances and goals as of 8 March 2026 ‡ National team caps and goals as of 26 March 2024

Mamady Diambou (born 11 November 2002) is a Malian professional footballer who plays as a defensive midfielder for Ligue 1 club Brest and the Mali national team.

== Club career ==
Diambou joined Red Bull Salzburg on 4 January 2021. After the agreement he was loaned to 2. Liga club FC Liefering.

On 4 January 2023, Diambou signed for Swiss Super League club Luzern on loan until the end of the season.

== International career ==
In June 2023, Diambou was included in the final squad of the Malian under-23 national team for the 2023 U-23 Africa Cup of Nations, hosted in Morocco, where the Eagles finished in third place and qualified for the 2024 Summer Olympics in Paris.

On 26 March 2024, he made his debut for the senior Mali national team and assisted a goal in a 2–0 victory over Nigeria in a friendly match.

== Career statistics ==
=== Club ===
As of match played 8 March 2026

Appearances and goals by club, season and competition
Club	Season	League			National cup (Note: Includes Austrian Cup, Swiss Cup)		Europe		Other		Total	
Club	Season	Division	Apps	Goals	Apps	Goals	Apps	Goals	Apps	Goals	Apps	Goals
Red Bull Salzburg	2021–22	Austrian Bundesliga	8	0	2	0	0	0	0	0	10	0
Red Bull Salzburg	2022–22	Austrian Bundesliga	4	0	2	0	0	0	0	0	6	0
Red Bull Salzburg	2023–24	Austrian Bundesliga	14	0	2	0	0	0	0	0	16	0
Red Bull Salzburg	2024–25	Austrian Bundesliga	20	0	2	1	10 (Note: Appearances in UEFA Champions League)	0	1 (Note: Appearance in FIFA Club World Cup)	0	33	1
Red Bull Salzburg	2025–26	Austrian Bundesliga	9	0	2	0	3 (Note: Two appearances in UEFA Champions League, one appearance in UEFA Europa League)	0	—		14	0
Red Bull Salzburg	Total		55	0	10	1	13	0	1	0	79	1
FC Liefering (loan)	2020–21	2. Liga	14	1	—		—		—		14	1
FC Liefering (loan)	2021–22	2. Liga	18	2	—		—		—		18	2
FC Liefering (loan)	Total		32	3	—		—		—		32	3
Luzern (loan)	2022–23	Swiss Super League	13	0	1	0	—		—		14	0
Career total			100	3	11	1	13	0	1	0	125	4

=== International ===
As of match played on 26 March 2024

Appearances and goals by national team and year
National team	Year	Apps	Goals
Mali	2024	1	0
Total		1	0

== Honours ==
Red Bull Salzburg

- Austrian Bundesliga: 2021–22, 2022–23
- Austrian Cup: 2021–22

Mali U-23

- U-23 Africa Cup of Nations third place: 2023
