= Youba Diarra =

Malian footballer

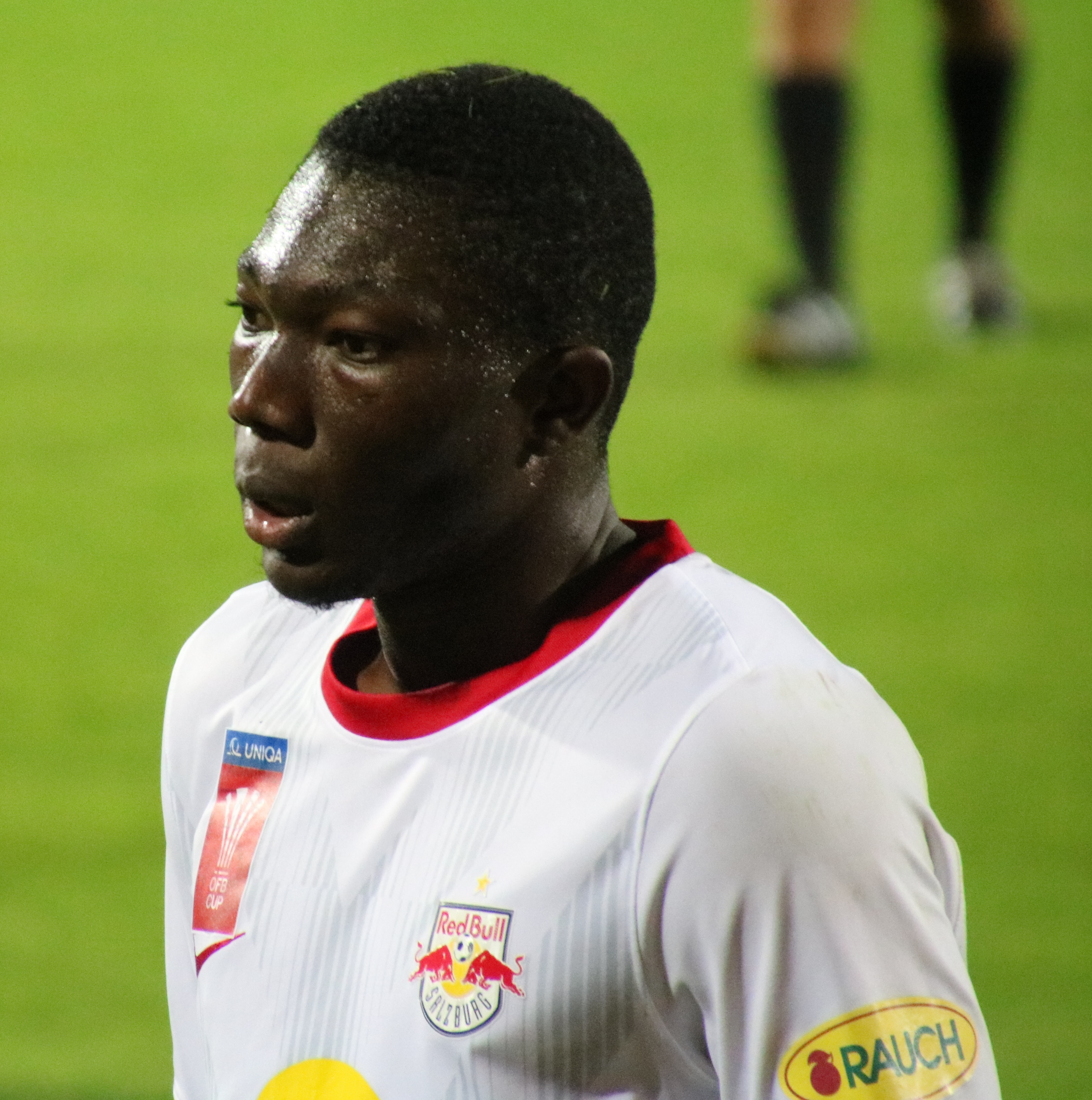
- Diarra in 2022

Personal information
- Full name: Hamaciré Youba Diarra
- Date of birth: 24 March 1998 (age 28)
- Place of birth: Bamako, Mali
- Height: 1.78 m (5 ft 10 in)
- Position: Midfielder

Team information
- Current team: TSV Hartberg
- Number: 5

Youth career
- Yeelen Olympique

Senior career*
Years	Team	Apps	(Gls)
2018–2022	Red Bull Salzburg	7	(1)
2018	→ Wiener Neustadt (loan)	14	(0)
2018	→ TSV Hartberg (loan)	10	(0)
2019–2020	→ FC Liefering (loan)	7	(2)
2019–2020	→ FC St. Pauli (loan)	3	(0)
2021	→ New York Red Bulls (loan)	7	(0)
2022	→ TSV Hartberg (loan)	14	(0)
2023–2025	Cádiz	5	(0)
2023	→ Asteras Tripolis (loan)	9	(0)
2024	Cádiz B	11	(1)
2024–2025	→ TSV Hartberg (loan)	29	(2)
2025–	TSV Hartberg	16	(0)
- * Club domestic league appearances and goals as of 10 June 2026

Hamaciré Youba Diarra (born 24 March 1998) is a Malian professional footballer who plays as a midfielder for Austrian Bundesliga club TSV Hartberg.

== Club career ==
Born in Bamako, Diarra started his career with the youth setup of local club Yeelen Olympique. In January 2018 he moved to Austrian Bundesliga club Red Bull Salzburg, with whom he signed a contract that ran until May 2022. However, he was soon after loaned to Second Division club Wiener Neustadt. In March 2018 he made his debut for Wiener Neustadt in the 2. Liga when he started against Floridsdorfer AC on the 23rd match day of the 2017–18 season. While with the club he helped them to a third place finish and qualification for the promotion play-off.

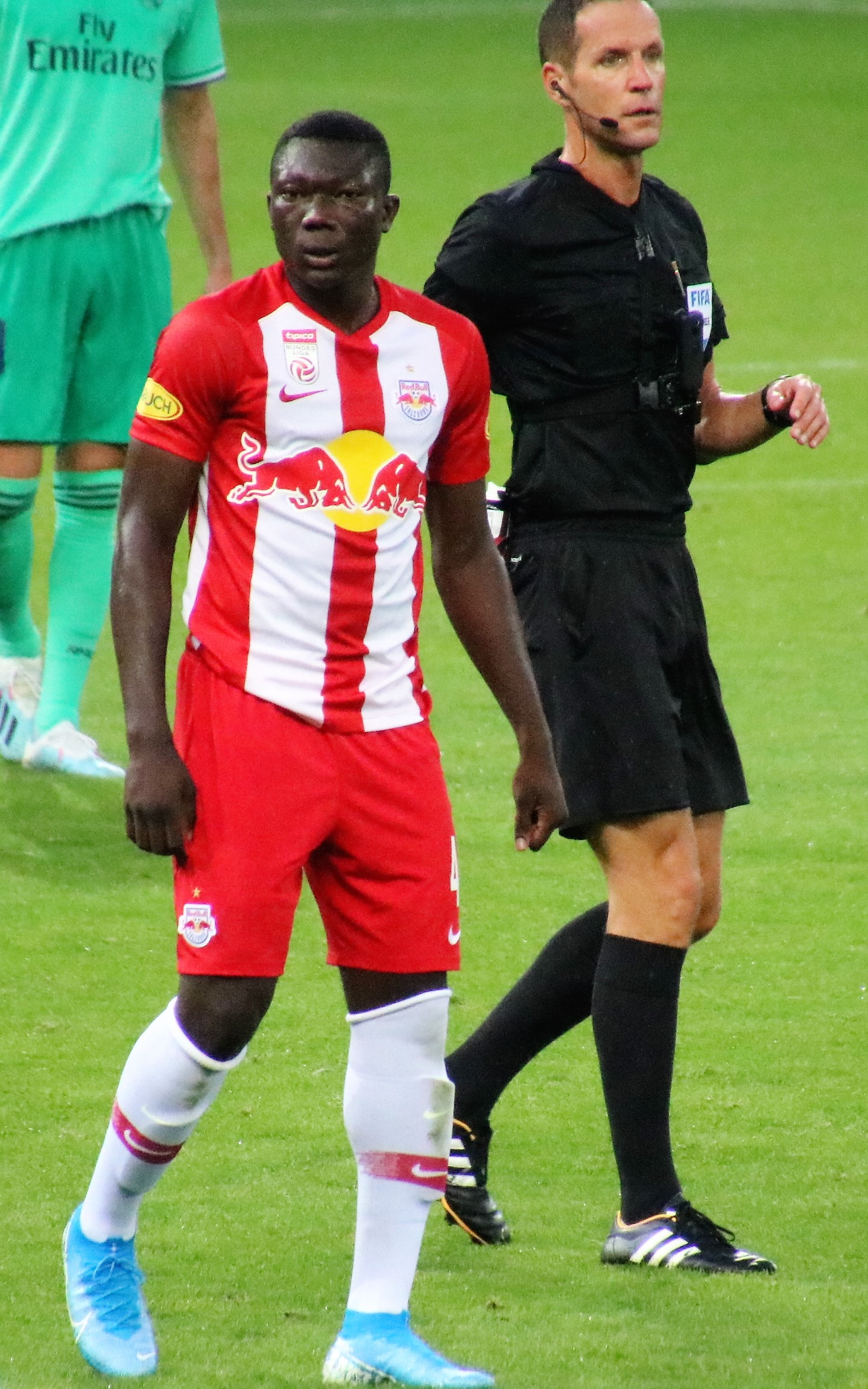
Diarra playing for Salzburg

For the 2018–19 season Diarra was loaned to Austrian Bundesliga club TSV Hartberg. After suffering a cruciate ligament rupture, the loan contract was terminated in January 2019.

After six months on loan with TSV Hartberg, he returned to Red Bull Salzburg in January 2019. After recovering from his injury, in August 2019 he played for the first time for the Red Bull Salzburg reserve team, FC Liefering.

On 29 August 2019, Diarra was loaned out to FC St. Pauli for the 2019–20 season. After only three appearances for FC St. Pauli in the 2. Bundesliga due to injury, his contract with the German club was terminated in January 2020 and he returned to Salzburg.

Diarra made his return from injury with FC Liefering during June 2020. On 11 June 2020, he scored his first goal as a professional in a 3–0 victory over Floridsdorfer AC. On 24 June 2020, Diarra scored another goal in a 4–1 victory over Wacker Innsbruck.

On 1 March 2021, Diarra moved to MLS side New York Red Bulls, on a loan deal. On 17 April 2021, Diarra made his debut for New York, appearing as a starter in a 2–1 loss to Sporting Kansas City.

On 8 January 2022, Diarra moved to TSV Hartberg on another six-month loan – his second stint at the club. He then returned to Salzburg for the 2022–23 season. He made seven Bundesliga appearances for Salzburg before the winter break.

On 27 December 2022, Diarra signed a four-and-a-half-year contract with Spanish La Liga side Cádiz. The following 31 August, he moved on loan to Greek side Asteras Tripolis on a one-year loan deal.

Diarra returned to TSV Hartberg on loan on 28 June 2024.

== Career statistics ==
As of match played 2 November 2024

Appearances and goals by club, season and competition
Club	Season	League			National Cup		League Cup		Continental		Total	
Club	Season	Division	Apps	Goals	Apps	Goals	Apps	Goals	Apps	Goals	Apps	Goals
Wiener Neustadt (loan)	2017–18	2. Liga	14	0	0	0	2	0	0	0	16	0
TSV Hartberg (loan)	2018–19	Austrian Bundesliga	10	0	2	0	0	0	0	0	12	0
FC St. Pauli (loan)	2019–20	2. Bundesliga	3	0	0	0	0	0	0	0	3	0
FC Liefering (loan)	2019–20	2. Liga	7	2	0	0	0	0	0	0	7	2
Red Bull Salzburg	2020–21	Austrian Bundesliga	0	0	0	0	0	0	0	0	0	0
New York Red Bulls (loan)	2021	MLS	7	0	0	0	0	0	0	0	7	0
Cádiz	2022–23	La Liga	5	0	0	0	—		—		5	0
Asteras Tripolis (loan)	2023–24	Superleague Greece	9	0	1	0	—		—		10	0
TSV Hartberg (loan)	2024–25	Austrian Bundesliga	11	0	3	1	0	0	0	0	14	1
Career total			64	2	6	1	2	0	0	0	72	2
