= TSV Hartberg =

Association football club in Austria

- Full name: Turn- und Sportverein Hartberg
- Founded: 29 April 1946; 80 years ago
- Ground: Profertil Arena Hartberg
- Capacity: 5,024
- Chairman: Brigitte Annerl
- Manager: Markus Schopp
- League: Austrian Bundesliga
- 2025–26: Austrian Bundesliga, 6th of 12
- Website: tsv-hartberg-fussball.at
Home colours	Away colours

Turn- und Sportverein Hartberg (officially known as TSV Egger Glas Hartberg for sponsorship reasons) is an Austrian professional football club based in Hartberg, Styria. Founded in 1946, the club plays in the Austrian Bundesliga, the highest level of the Austrian football league system.

Hartberg were promoted to the Bundesliga for the first time in 2018 and have since established themselves in the top flight. In the 2019–20 season, they qualified for European competition for the first time, earning a place in the 2020–21 UEFA Europa League qualifiers.

The club plays its home matches at the Profertil Arena Hartberg, a 4,500-capacity stadium, and traditionally wears blue and white.

== History ==
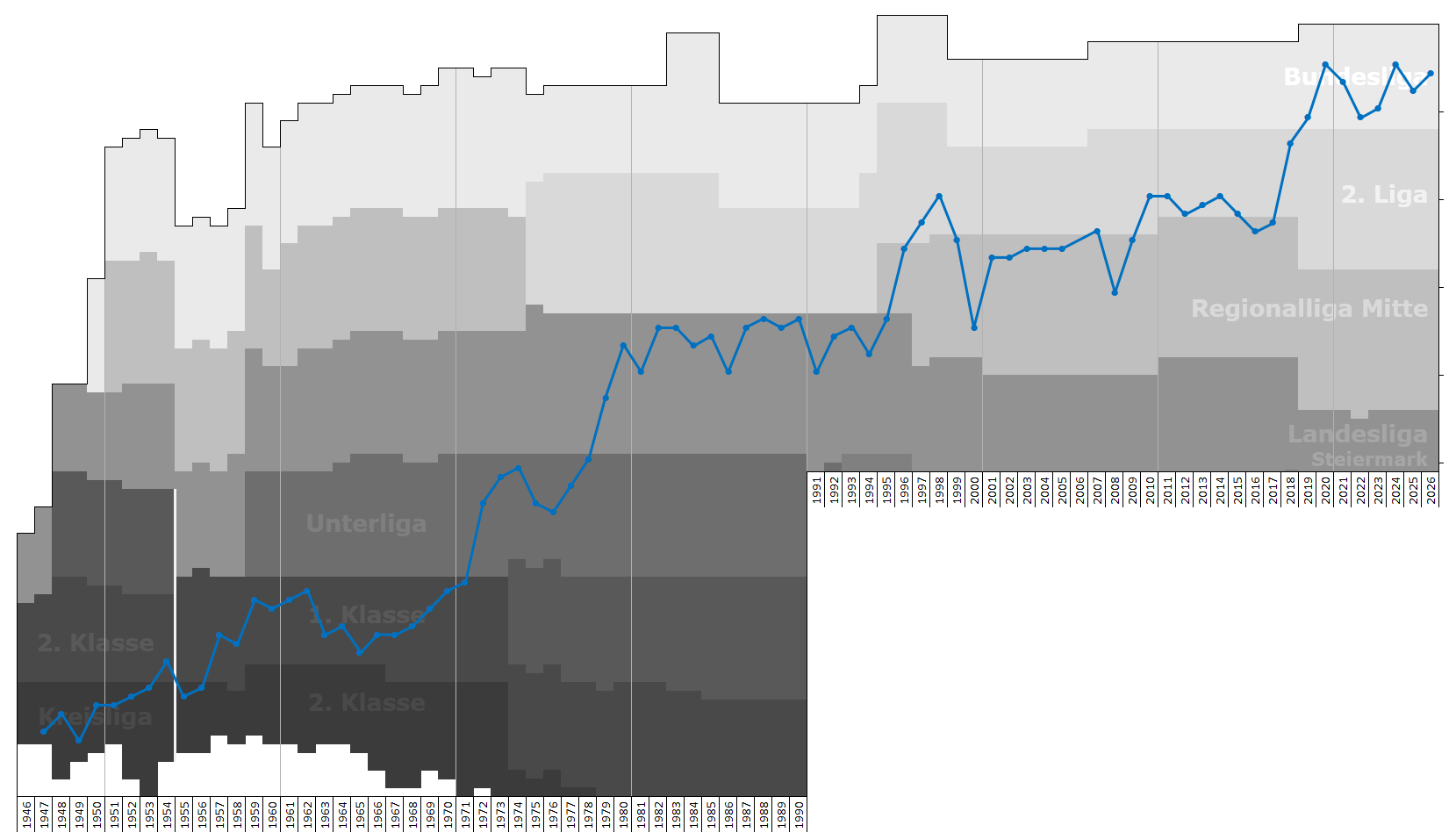
Historical chart of Hartberg league performance

TSV Hartberg was established on 29 April 1946. After decades in the lower Styrian leagues, the club achieved promotion to the Styrian Landesliga in 1978, supported by sponsor Sparkasse Hartberg.

Throughout the 1980s, Hartberg gained a reputation as a strong cup competitor, often defeating higher-tier teams. In the 1986–87 Austrian Cup, the club reached the round of 16, notably eliminating Wiener Sport-Club. That team featured Hans Krankl, one of Austria's most prominent footballers, a former European Golden Shoe winner and star of Barcelona and the national team. In 1987–88, Hartberg won the Landesliga for the first time but failed to secure promotion after finishing second in the playoffs.

The club's most notable cup performance came in 1988–89, reaching the Austrian Cup quarter-finals as a fourth-tier side. Victories included top-flight SK Austria Klagenfurt and second-tier SV Spittal/Drau, before losing on penalties to SV Austria Salzburg after a 3–3 draw.

In 1989–90, Hartberg won the Landesliga again but was once more unsuccessful in the promotion playoffs. After several mid-table seasons, the club won the league a third time in 1994–95, earning promotion to the Regionalliga Mitte (third tier). That same season, Hartberg reached the Austrian Cup semi-finals, defeating three higher-division clubs before a 1–0 loss to DSV Leoben.

The following season, 1995–96, Hartberg won the Regionalliga Mitte and secured promotion to the Second Division (then known as the 2. Division). However, the club was relegated in 1997–98 following a league restructuring, despite avoiding relegation under the existing format. In 1998–99, Hartberg again won the Regionalliga Mitte but failed to return to the second tier after losing a two-legged promotion playoff to WSG Wattens.

In the 2005–06 season, the club captured its third Regionalliga Mitte title, earning promotion to the Second Division (at that time called the Erste Liga). The club was relegated after a single season and returned to the Regionalliga Mitte for the 2007–08 campaign, where it finished seventh.

In 2008–09, Hartberg won the Regionalliga Ost title on the final matchday, securing promotion to the Austrian Second Division (then known as the First League). In the 2010–11 season, the club finished last in the league but avoided relegation by winning the play-off. However, in 2014–15, after once again finishing in bottom place, Hartberg was relegated to the third tier.

TSV Hartberg were promoted to the Second Division after winning the 2016–17 Regionalliga Mitte. As no clubs from the Regionalliga West or Ost applied for promotion, Hartberg advanced without the need for play-offs. In the 2017–18 Second Division season, Hartberg finished second and secured promotion to the Austrian Bundesliga for the first time in the club's history. Promotion was confirmed following a successful appeal for a top-flight license. In the 2019–20 season, Hartberg finished fifth in the Austrian Bundesliga, qualifying for the 2020–21 UEFA Europa League qualifying phase. The club was eliminated in the second qualifying round following a defeat to Polish side Piast Gliwice.

== European record ==
Season	Competition	Round	Club	Home	Away	Aggregate
2020–21	UEFA Europa League	2QR	(Poland) Piast Gliwice	—N/a	2–3	—N/a

== Stadium ==
Stadion Hartberg is based in the Styria Hartberg district capital. It is a multipurpose sports facility, both for football matches and it is also suitable for athletics events. In addition, the stadium for other events such as music concerts. In 2006, the stadium of TSV Hartberg was expanded to that it could seat both home and away visitors with a capacity of 6,000 increasing from 4,500.

== Current squad ==
As of 8 September 2026

Note: Flags indicate national team as defined under FIFA eligibility rules; some limited exceptions apply. Players may hold more than one non-FIFA nationality.

No.	Pos.	Nation	Player
2	DF	AUT	Luca Pazourek (on loan from Austria Wien)
3	DF	AUT	Simon Freund
4	MF	SLO	Benjamin Markuš
5	MF	MLI	Youba Diarra
6	DF	CIV	Habib Coulibaly
7	FW	AUT	Angelo Gattermayer
8	FW	AUT	Matthias Postl
9	FW	ARG	Agustín Urrutia
10	MF	CRO	Oliver Lukić (on loan from Red Bull Salzburg)
11	FW	AUS	Jed Drew
12	DF	AUT	Manuel Pfeifer
14	DF	AUT	Paul Komposch
16	DF	AUT	Magnus Dalpiaz (on loan from Bayern Munich II)
17	MF	AUT	Jonas Karner
18	DF	AUT	Fabian Wilfinger

No.	Pos.	Nation	Player
19	DF	AUT	Lukas Spendlhofer
20	MF	AUT	Paul Bratschko
21	GK	AUT	Luka Marić
22	FW	AUT	Marco Hoffmann
23	MF	AUT	Tobias Kainz (captain)
27	DF	AUT	Konstantin Schopp (on loan from Mainz 05)
28	MF	AUT	Florian Gerstl
30	FW	AUT	Lukas Fridrikas
44	GK	AUT	Harald Postl
49	FW	MNE	Andrija Radulović (on loan from Rapid Wien)
70	FW	GER	Chilohem Onuoha (on loan from Estrela da Amadora)
77	FW	AUT	David Korherr
91	GK	HUN	Ármin Pécsi (on loan from Liverpool)
95	MF	AUT	Nikolaus Feldhofer

== Staff and board members ==
=== Sports ===
- President: (Austria) Brigitte Annerl
- Director of Football: (Austria) Erich Korherr
- Manager: (Austria) Manfred Schmid
- Assistant manager: (Austria) Philipp Neumann
- Assistant manager: (Austria) Joachim Köhler
- Assistant manager: (Austria) Dieter-Fritz Großmann
- Goalkeeper coach: (Austria) Moritz Niewald
- Academy manager: (Austria) Manuel Kauff

== Managerial history ==
- Unknown (1946–1994)
- (Austria) Gerald Gamperl (1 July 1994 – 30 June 1996)
- (Austria) Manfred Wirth (1 July 1996 – 20 April 1997)
- (Austria) Hermann Wagner (27 April 1997 – 31 December 1997)
- (Austria) Hans-Peter Schaller (1 January 1998 – 30 June 1999)
- (Austria) Stefan Dörner (1 July 2000 – 25 November 2004)
- (Austria) Norbert Barisits (1 January 2005 – 16 October 2006)
- (Poland) Andrzej Lesiak (22 October 2006 – 31 May 2007)
- (Austria) Bruno Friesenbichler (1 July 2007 – 30 June 2011)
- (Austria) Kurt Garger (1 July 2011 – 31 March 2012)
- (Austria) Walter Hörmann (1 April 2012 – 10 June 2012)
- (Austria) Andreas Moriggl (11 June 2012 – 15 October 2012)
- (Austria) Paul Gludovatz (15 October 2012 – 17 May 2013)
- (Austria) Werner Ofner (interim) (17 May 2013 – 31 May 2013)
- (Austria) Bruno Friesenbichler (1 July 2013 – 19 June 2014)
- (Bosnia and Herzegovina) Ivo Istuk (19 June 2014 – 17 July 2014)
- (Austria) Bruno Friesenbichler (17 July 2014 – 4 June 2015)
- (Austria) Christian Ilzer (5 June 2015 – 25 November 2015)
- (Austria) Uwe Hölzl (12 December 2015 – 16 June 2016)
- (Austria) Philipp Semlic/Uwe Hölzl (16 June 2016 – 30 June 2017)
- (Austria) Christian Ilzer (1 July 2017 – 2018)
- (Austria) Markus Schopp (2018 – 2021)
- (Austria) Kurt Russ (2021 – 2022)
- (Austria) Klaus Schmidt (2022)
- (Austria) Markus Schopp (2022 – 2024)
