= Stadion Hartberg =

Football stadium

Coordinates: 47.2812°N 15.9778°E

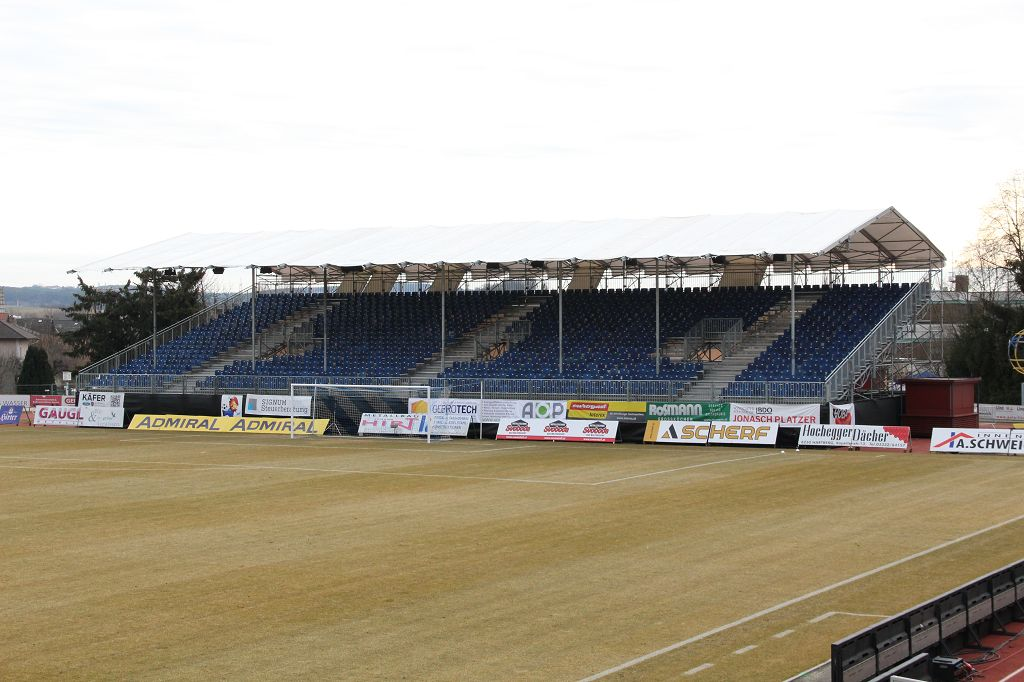
Stadion Hartberg in 2019

Stadion Hartberg, known as Profertil Arena Hartberg since 2014 for sponsorship reasons, is a football stadium in Hartberg, Austria. It is the home ground of TSV Hartberg, who compete in the Austrian Bundesliga. It was opened in 1946 and has a capacity of 5,024.

Following TSV Hartberg's promotion to the Austrian Bundesliga in 2018, the ground was modified to meet the league's requirements, with new stands constructed and under-soil heating installed. TSV Hartberg plan to construct a new 8,500 capacity stadium in Hartberg to replace the Stadion Hartberg.
